= List of Cedar Cove episodes =

Cedar Cove is a drama television series on the Hallmark Channel that began on July 20, 2013. Based on author Debbie Macomber's book series of the same name, Cedar Cove focuses on Municipal Court Judge Olivia Lockhart's professional and personal life. It is the network's first-ever original, scripted series. During the course of its run, it aired 36 episodes.

== Series overview ==
Season	Episodes	Originally released	
Season	Episodes	First released	Last released
1	13	July 20, 2013	October 12, 2013
2	12	July 19, 2014	October 4, 2014
3	11	July 18, 2015	September 26, 2015

== Episodes ==
=== Season 1 (2013) ===
No. overall	No. in season	Title	Directed by	Written by	Original release date	Prod. code	US viewers (millions)
1	1	"Pilot"	Michael M. Scott	Bruce Graham	July 20, 2013	100-120	2.62
Olivia Lockhart (Andie MacDowell) is the divorced municipal court judge of Cedar Cove and is dealing with the death of her son. She is soon offered a federal judgeship by a Washington State Senator Pete Raymond (Barclay Hope) whom she knows from law school. He chose to nominate her for the federal position because only one of her some 20 court decisions that had been appealed was overturned by the higher court. Word of this quickly reaches reporter Jack Griffith (Dylan Neal), a newcomer to small-town life. He is also an alcoholic trying to get his life in order. Olivia's daughter Justine (Sarah Smyth) gets a marriage proposal from Warren Saget (Brennan Elliott), a wealthy home developer. She wants to wait and goes to her high school reunion where she meets Seth (Greyston Holt for this episode), her sweetheart back then. He attempts to kiss her, she pushes him away, and they get into an argument. She later accepts Warren's proposal. Olivia prepares for the federal judgeship, until she reads Jack's article about her departure and sees her huge farewell party. She tells Jack not to print the story, as she is staying put.
2	2	"A House Divided"	Andy Mikita	Carl Binder	July 27, 2013	1001	2.41
Olivia's best friend, Grace Sherman (Teryl Rothery), returns from vacation, during which she has received divorce papers from her husband. Warren threatens to tear down the historic lighthouse. Bob (Bruce Boxleitner) and Peggy Beldon (Barbara Niven) lead the townspeople in protest. The case ends up in Olivia's courtroom. Her new romance with Jack is threatened when he publishes an unfavorable story about Olivia and the case. Justine ends her engagement to Warren and rekindles her relationship with Seth. At a loss to find a legal loophole to save the lighthouse, Olivia is told a preservation philanthropist will put up 80% of the land's value. Olivia covers the rest. Warren agrees to the deal but only if he can take credit for changing his mind to save the lighthouse. She reluctantly accepts.
3	3	"Reunion"	Martin Wood	Carl Binder	August 3, 2013	1002	1.99
Jack’s estranged son Eric (Tom Stevens) arrives unannounced in Cedar Cove. Jack must endure Eric's rehashing his father’s alcoholic past and poor parenting. Grace sees Eric steal money from the newspaper lockbox and approaches Olivia about it. Before Jack can be told about Eric's questionable behavior, Eric admits to "borrowing" the money. Meanwhile, Olivia's mother Charlotte (Paula Shaw) is given a key by a stroke patient at a hospital where she volunteers. The man dies and Charlotte must get help with the key from Olivia's ex-husband Stan (Andrew Airlie) when her daughter initially refuses. Stan says the key unlocks a storage locker, which contains his belongings and identity. The man was a once-popular country music star who had abandoned his family. Elsewhere, Seth must leave town again, but gives Justine the keys to his boat and a book on astronomy. They agree to look at Polaris at night, knowing the other is looking at it, as well.
4	4	"Suspicious Minds"	Michael M. Scott	Eric Tuchman	August 10, 2013	1003	2.07
Bob and Peggy allow an injured man, who shows up in the middle of the night, to stay at the Thyme and Tide. The next morning, Peggy finds him dead in his room. Word quickly spreads throughout the town. Sheriff Davis (Garry Chalk) investigates and Jack covers the story. Concerned with Jack's son's, Eric's, mood, Olivia gives him a job. Meanwhile, at the town's annual Art Walk, Justine receives a prominent booth to display her work. Her father Stan arrives to support her, invoking unresolved feelings.
5	5	"For the Sake of the Children"	Neill Fearnley	Susin Nielsen	August 17, 2013	1004	1.96
In court, Olivia hears both sides of Rosie (Kendall Cross) and Zach Westen's (Lochlyn Munro) divorce case, struggling to decide what's best for the Westen children, Allison (Matreya Fedor) and Eddie (Sean Michael Kyer). The case causes Olivia to have painful memories of her own divorce. Jack also recalls his past when he notices Eric is stalling to find a job while taking advantage of his father's guilt. Meanwhile, after budget cuts forces the Mayor to close the town library, Grace raises the money to keep it open herself by hosting a fundraiser, where she meets a charming new arrival, Cliff Harting (Sebastian Spence).
6	6	"Free Spirits"	Michael M. Scott	Bruce Graham	August 24, 2013	1005	2.10
When Seth doesn't come home from his job at sea, a concerned Justine takes a dangerous trip to a remote Alaskan town to find him. Olivia recalls the death of her son several years ago. Worried about Justine, she loses sleep and is hesitant to go to Seattle for the weekend with Jack. Both she and Justine ultimately realize their adventures might be worth letting go of their fears.
7	7	"Help Wanted"	Peter DeLuise	Eric Tuchman	August 31, 2013	1006	1.58
The Westen divorce takes a toll on daughter Allison, and she works more at the inn to escape. Her mother gets a permanent room there and pushes Allison's limits. Then, before Jack and Olivia can get some time away to be together, Lenny (Richard De Klerk), a reformed criminal she helped put in jail years ago, returns to town seeking a fresh start. She promises to help him find a job, but everyone in town shuns him. The harbor's pergola catches fire and Lenny is viewed as the culprit, but a court decision shocks everyone.
8	8	"And the Winner Is..."	Martin Wood	Bruce Graham	September 7, 2013	1007	1.83
Justine and Olivia scheme to help Grace and Maryellen (Elyse Levesque) win their respective men—Cliff Harting and John Bowman (Charlie Carrick)—in the town's charity bachelor auction, which is organized by Charlotte. Jack is sure he can count on a winning bid from Olivia, but he questions their relationship when her ex-husband Stan asks her to help him finally deal with the death of their son. The winner of the auction is a surprise to Olivia and the rest of the townspeople.
9	9	"Old Flames, New Sparks"	Martin Wood	Ken Craw	September 14, 2013	1008	2.23
Threatened by Olivia's renewed bond with her Stan, Jack realizes his feelings for her are moving fast. Meanwhile, Grace spends more time with her old crush, Olivia's brother Will (Cameron Bancroft), who confides a deep secret in her that could change the terms of their relationship. While they grapple with their histories, Olivia's and Grace's daughters begin to plan their futures, as Justine decides to move in with Seth and Maryellen realizes she should take things slow with John Bowman after discovering he might not be who she thinks he is.
10	10	"Conflicts of Interest"	Neill Fearnley	Susin Nielsen	September 21, 2013	1009	N/A
After Grace kisses Will, he won't stop calling to confess his feelings. Worried that Olivia will eventually find out, Grace decides to tell her, only to discover Will has been hiding something about his marriage. Meanwhile, Warren has a heart attack, and Justine rushes to his side. This adds stress for Seth, who is debating on taking a four-month job at sea. Stan's wife Melanie (Anne Marie DeLuise) visits Olivia, who is dealing with a minor car accident. Jack comforts Olivia, but gets a call from a sports editor about a Philadelphia job.
11	11	"Stormfront"	Neill Fearnley	Bruce Graham	September 28, 2013	1010	1.89
Stan files for divorce and decides to move back to Cedar Cove. He claims it's to be closer to Justine, but Olivia senses he is trying to win her back, causing her to be nostalgic. Jack turns down the Philadelphia job offer to stay with Olivia. She is nervous to tell him about Stan's return, and he hears the news from Stan himself. Grace, shaken over Will's lies, finally reveals their affair. After Maryellen investigates John's deceptive past, she confronts him about it.
12	12	"A New Life"	Martin Wood	Bruce Graham	October 5, 2013	1011	2.22
As the Christmas season approaches, Olivia's spirits are down when Jack moves to Philadelphia after their sudden breakup. However, when he returns to hire his replacement at the Chronicle, his lingering love for Olivia arises. Complicating his short stay even further, he finds one last story to cover after noticing FBI agents watching a nervous Warren Saget. Justine is stunned when Seth returns with an offer that could change both of their futures. At the Thyme and Tide Inn, Peggy welcomes Shelly (Hayley Sales), a young pregnant woman whose shocking connection to the community—the identity of her baby's father—is revealed after she asks Olivia for legal counsel for an adoption.
13	13	"Homecoming"	Martin Wood	Carl Binder	October 12, 2013	1012	2.36
Justine and Seth finally learn the truth about Warren’s corrupt business deals and double-life, but she gets in danger when cooperating with the FBI. Grace convinces Cliff to give dating another chance, while Olivia and Jack are happily reunited after he makes Cedar Cove his permanent home. They must track down Eric, who now is responsible for his unborn daughter. When he finally arrives at the Thyme and Tide Inn, his reunion with girlfriend Shelly turns bittersweet as complications of her pregnancy force her to be hospitalized. Unexpected devastation hits Justine and Seth’s new restaurant on Christmas day, and the townspeople prove their compassion for others.

=== Season 2 (2014) ===
No. overall	No. in season	Title	Directed by	Written by	Original release date	Prod. code	US viewers (millions)
14	1	"Letting Go: Part One"	Martin Wood	Sue Tenney	July 19, 2014	2001	1.69
Olivia and Jack rush to the hospital to wait with his son, Eric, as girlfriend Shelly suffers from a serious pregnancy complication. Scared, Eric angrily pushes his father away, causing Olivia to recall the day her son died in the hospital. However, she must remain strong for Shelly, who has made a decision about her future that could affect them all. Meanwhile, Justine and Seth cope with the restaurant fire's aftermath and a surprising development in the federal investigation against her manipulative ex-fiancé, Warren. Elsewhere, Maryellen goes to extra lengths to help a missing John when two mysterious men arrive to track him down, posing a threat to the town.
15	2	"Letting Go: Part Two"	Martin Wood	Sue Tenney	July 26, 2014	2002	1.86
Olivia and Jack attempt to stop a mounting custody dispute between Eric and Shelly over the future of their unborn child, emotions run high at the hospital. Meanwhile, Maryellen refuses to believe John is a criminal, but, when she learns he will do anything to protect her from the felons of his past, she makes a drastic move to find him without the police's help, never guessing John will surprise her with a dramatic plan of his own. Also, on the brink of a major life decision, Justine is finally able to stand up to a still-scheming Warren and get honest with Seth about the next step in their relationship, including a dream job offer. Then, just as Jack and Olivia each find the words to break through to Eric and Shelly, they are both able to reconcile some painful moments from their own pasts and welcome a new family member into their lives and Cedar Cove.
16	3	"Relations and Relationships"	Neill Fearnley	Bruce Graham	August 2, 2014	2003	2.10
All the women in Cedar Cove are learning how to move on and embrace better futures. Olivia feels pressured when Jack insists on exchanging house keys, unsure of the next step. Suddenly seeing troubling comparisons to her ex in Jack's growing frustration over the issue, she panics, just as Grace faces upsetting reminders of her own failed marriage. After struggling to pay for expensive repairs to her house, she is overwhelmed and in debt. While Olivia tries to convince her to sell the home, Grace doesn't think she can let it go, seeing that as the final, drastic closure to her previous life. Meanwhile, Eric struggles to financially support his new family, prompting Shelly to reconsider their relationship. Also, Justine prepares to say goodbye to Seth as he departs for a job in Alaska.
17	4	"Old Wounds"	Neill Fearnley	Bruce Graham	August 9, 2014	2004	1.88
Grace learns her ex-husband Dan (Roark Critchlow) lied to her in a fraudulent divorce, preventing her from being able to officially move on. Olivia convinces her to track down Dan to confront him and take him back to court. However, surprises about Dan's new life arise and suddenly sends Grace running scared. Meanwhile, Jack tries to support Eric after Shelly and the baby take off for Seattle. Devastated and worried about money, Eric then gets an unexpected offer from Jack regarding his future. When Eric receives an even more surprising proposition from Warren Saget, he must make a tough decision. Justine bonds with new friend Cecilia (Emily Tennant) on the navy base, where she meets distressed veteran Luke (Jesse Hutch), who is hailed as a hero after returning from Afghanistan, but has a troubling past and a hidden secret that puts Justine in a difficult position to help him.
18	5	"Starting Over"	Andy Mikita	Susin Nielsen	August 16, 2014	2005	1.73
Olivia presides on Grace's case against her conniving ex-husband, Dan, over their unsettled divorce. Although Grace is ready to admit defeat, Olivia helps find her own voice. Then, when Jack is assigned to write a piece praising Warren Saget, he is torn between keeping his job or his journalistic integrity. After he writes the article, he discovers Warren has the final word regarding Eric. Meanwhile, Justine attempts to help Luke find peace and start a new chapter, after he opens up to her about the worst tragedy of the war. When his brooding suddenly erupts into a violent rage, she realizes he is much more complicated, and possibly more dangerous, than she imagined.
19	6	"Trials and Tribulations"	Andy Mikita	Ken Craw	August 23, 2014	2006	1.99
Olivia and Jack realize letting their children make their own decisions can only bring them closer. As Justine tries to help Luke after his outburst lands him in jail, she hides her involvement from her mother, even as he begs her to stay away during his depression. Meanwhile, Eric is determined to impress Warren on the job, while still hoping to get approval from Jack, who worries this rift could unravel their strengthening bond. After Cliff gives Grace an exciting offer right before her move, her reluctance might drive them apart. Then, when Luke goes missing before his court date, Bob Beldon takes a special interest in the boy's struggle and Justine learns a revealing secret about the real reason for his unpredictable outrage. She has no choice but to ask help from everyone, including Olivia who might be the only person with the power to get him what he really needs.
20	7	"One Day at a Time"	Martin Wood	Mark Haroun	August 30, 2014	2007	1.76
Two newcomers appear ready to shake things up in Cedar Cove. With Luke's assault trial getting closer, Olivia meets new Assistant District Attorney Rebecca Jennings (Cindy Busby), who believes winning the high-profile case will improve her chances of getting out of town. Rebecca shocks the courtroom when she demands to prosecute Luke. While Olivia attempts to teach her a lesson before Luke is unfairly sent to jail, Jack meets a former colleague from his past, Jeri (Julia Benson), whose relationship with Jack clearly went beyond the newsroom. Jack attempts to keep Jeri away from Olivia as he watches Eric fall deeper into Warren's manipulations—and fall for Rebecca's dangerous flirts. Then, as Luke faces a tough sentence, he admits his growing attraction to Justine, causing her to take a step back from their friendship to run from her own undeniable feelings before things escalate. After Jeri corners Olivia to expose surprising details of Jack's alcoholic past, Olivia wonders if her own romantic relationship is suddenly at risk.
21	8	"Something Wicked This Way Comes"	Martin Wood	Derek Thompson	September 6, 2014	2008	1.97
Olivia learns Grace has been talking to her brother Will (Cameron Bancroft) again. Olivia worries there is something more than friendship between the two that neither is willing to confess. Upon arriving at Cedar Cove, he reveals some surprising news to his sister that causes Olivia to wonder if Grace is being honest about her feelings with herself – and with Cliff. Then, Olivia confronts Jack when he refuses to discuss Jeri's revelations. In asking him to finally open up, Olivia forces him to consider making a pivotal step in his recovery, with Bob's support. At the same time, Jack struggles to get Luke to discuss his own past for a profile in the Chronicle, just as Luke and Justine attempt to only remain friends while increasingly leaning on each other for support. After Eric starts casually dating Rebecca, he is faced with a work dilemma when Warren gives him an ultimatum.
22	9	"Point of No Return"	Martin Wood	Derek Thompson	September 13, 2014	2009	1.76
Olivia attempts to find common ground with Rebecca in hopes of repairing their relationship in the courtroom, but suspects she hasn't been completely honest. Meanwhile, Jack is excited to land an interview for a columnist position at the Seattle Courier. When he finds out his ex-wife, Jeri (Julia Benson), had something to do with it, he must decide if he can trust her. Elsewhere, Eric is torn when his ex wants to visit with their baby just as his new romance with Rebecca is getting serious. After asking Jack for advice, he decides to be honest with Rebecca, but Warren soon takes advantage of the situation. Then, as Grace deals with the repercussions of Will's visit and asks Cliff for space, the two men unexpectedly come face-to-face with drastic consequences. As Justine and Luke get mixed in with Cecilia and Ian's escalating fight over the future of their family, Olivia questions Jack's judgment.
23	10	"Secrets and Lies"	Gary Harvey	Bruce Graham	September 20, 2014	2010	1.72
Olivia decides to strike a deal with Rebecca to save her career, but doesn't anticipate her resistance. While Olivia tries to learn more about Rebecca's attitude, Jack develops writer's block trying to focus on his first article for the Seattle Courier. Grace rethinks her request for more space from Cliff when she feels threatened by his new lady ranch hand, Alex, and Cecilia moves to Olivia's house. Ian admits to her what he really wants, leaving her to keep one last secret. Likewise, Peggy Beldon continues to hide the truth about her private investigation from Bob, but her confession might come sooner than expected when an old family friend returns to town. Then, an emotional Justine avoids Luke after their close encounter at the beach, but after talking to her mother, she decides to choose between two men and makes a bold move. When Olivia's encouragement isn't enough, Jack travels to Seattle, where Jeri reminds him of his glory days in Philadelphia, sending him a down a dangerous path which could tear him and Olivia apart.
24	11	"Stand and Deliver"	Scott Smith	Sue Tenney	September 27, 2014	2011	1.93
Olivia worries that Jack's new job is too intense when he stays up all night to write, never guessing the return of his addiction is to blame. As Jack nervously tries to hide his drinking from everyone but Jeri, he excitedly pursues a bigger position at the paper in Seattle, one that will prompt him to consider keeping another secret from Olivia. Meanwhile, Justine receives a decision letter from grad school as she attempts to sort out her feelings for Luke, just in time for a surprise visitor. Eric takes his anger out on Rebecca after Shelly ends things for good, but his problems don’t end there. When Rebecca finds out Warren is avoiding his shady business partner Dick (William deVry) and dodging the FBI, she attempts to warn Eric that his involvement on the record could hurt him. But Eric's stubborn refusal to listen lands him right where Dick wants him. As Grace and Olivia investigate a distressing case of cyberbullying, Peggy finally comes face-to-face with the man from her past she fears the most. Then, while Jack continues to fall deeper into his addiction, an unsuspecting Olivia proposes a new plan for their future.
25	12	"Resolutions and Revelations"	Scott Smith	Sue Tenney	October 4, 2014	2012	2.05
Seth's return forces Justine to admit she kissed Luke and foreseeing the future she's planned without Seth. Olivia is worried Jack is starting to slip away since their talk about Seattle. While she attempts to learn why, Jack confides in Jeri his real reason for spending so much time at work. Meanwhile, Eric is caught between Warren and his angry business partner, Dick, when both are demanding the truth, but only telling lies. While Rebecca and Jack desperately try to convince Eric to get out before he's arrested or hurt, Eric is left to choose whom to trust. When Allison refuses Grace's help to turn her school bully over to the law, Peggy is able to give her the comfort and advice she wishes someone had once provided her. With a new determination, Peggy takes action against her own stalker and the truth about the painful memory she's hidden from Bob for so long is finally exposed. As Seth issues Justine an ultimatum for their future, Olivia finally gets answers from Jack.

=== Season 3 (2015) ===
No. overall	No. in season	Title	Directed by	Written by	Original release date	Prod. code	US viewers (millions)
26	1	"Hello Again"	Neill Fearnley	Sue Tenney & Bruce Graham	July 18, 2015	3001	1.46
Olivia and Jack take time apart after her devastating discovery of his relapse, leading them both on a painful search for forgiveness. A confident, handsome, new District Attorney arrives in Olivia's courtroom and makes a move for her attention. Grace weighs a surprise proposal and a new job opportunity in the community. Justine attempts to find happiness with Luke. When the whole town comes together for a good cause, Jack will prove everyone deserves a second chance when he presents Olivia with a plan for moving forward.
27	2	"A Helping Hand"	Gary Harvey	Story by : Sue Tenney; Teleplay by : Bruce Graham	July 25, 2015	3002	1.57
Olivia is left feeling conflicted following Jack's sudden proposal to move in together. As he starts pressuring her to decide, she has doubts if she can trust him and if she was too quick to forgive after his relapse. When he gets a surprise promotion in Seattle, his career – and old flame Jeri – threaten to tear him further apart from the relationship. New District Attorney Paul Watson starts spending more time with Olivia back in Cedar Cove. Maryellen surprises Grace with a visit home, but Grace can tell she's hiding a secret. When she overhears Maryellen talking with her boyfriend John, Grace jumps to a conclusion before getting all the facts, leading to a big misunderstanding. Peggy celebrates the success of the cookout and dreams of starting a new chapter in her life. However, Bob's lackadaisical support leaves them at a crossroads. Justine attempts to move out of her mother's home, but she finds herself with only days to secure a job before her Uncle Will intervenes with a plan that could potentially undermine Olivia. When Paul charms Olivia into working overtime with him at the courthouse, she misses a romantic gesture from Jack, causing them both to question if love is enough to save their relationship.
28	3	"Something's Gotta Give"	Gary Harvey	Story by : Sue Tenney; Teleplay by : Bruce Graham	August 1, 2015	3003	1.62
Following Olivia and Jack's fight, she worries that his drinking could return as they take a break, and her friendly connection to Paul grows. Warren refuses to back down when his father cuts him off and goes into business with a surprising new client. Grace takes on her first project as Town Manager, with a disappointing outcome. When the town comes together, a picture-perfect moment proves there is much more than meets the eye.
29	4	"Guess Who's Coming to Dinner"	Scott Smith	Sue Tenney & Amy Palmer Robertson	August 8, 2015	3004	1.59
Olivia is still struggling to trust Jack when her brother Will makes plans to move forward with the redevelopment of their mother's house. Still spending time apart from Jack, an upset Olivia turns to Paul for support, and he plans the perfect way to vent frustration. Meanwhile, Alcoholics Anonymous meetings bring Jack and Alex closer, but, when Jack steps in to help Alex with a problem at work, their new bond could make Olivia question if they can actually rebuild their trust. Cliff gives Grace an ultimatum regarding their engagement, and Warren is shocked by a visit from his estranged wife. When Olivia hosts a party to officially welcome Paul to town, the dinner quickly turns into a disaster when an outraged Will arrives uninvited. As their family dispute plays out in front of all of Olivia's friends, Grace reaches a dramatic decision about her engagement to Cliff. Luke learns the truth about Justine's past. Olivia finally realizes her sibling rivalry goes deeper than she ever imagined.
30	5	"Civil War"	Scott Smith	Sue Tenney & Amy Palmer Robertson	August 15, 2015	3005	1.65
Olivia and Jack discuss their trust issues with each other and wonder if men and women can truly be just friends. Olivia is then concerned after Grace calls off her engagement to Cliff, even as Grace insists she is fine with her decision. Bob and Peggy also aren't believing it and secretly devise a plan to prove she is only kidding herself. As Olivia serves Will papers to prove she is serious about stopping his real estate plans, some unsolicited advice from Paul makes her second-guess putting everything at stake for a piece of property. Justine wants to help when she meets a fellow veteran from Luke's past, who is running away from his life and hiding a secret. After Jack helps Alex navigate a test of her sobriety while Olivia spends even more time alone with Paul, everyone learns ignoring a problem won't make it go away.
31	6	"Batter Up"	Neill Fearnley	Story by : Sue Tenney; Teleplay by : Sue Tenney & Bruce Graham	August 22, 2015	3006	1.66
Cedar Cove's annual charity baseball game approaches, bringing promises to pit the town's most unlikely rivals against each other. Olivia and Jack agree to work on strengthening their relationship, but when Paul welcomes his sister Liz to town, he finds she is eager to get acquainted with the beautiful judge who has caught her brother's attention. Convinced Paul has real feelings for Olivia, Liz pries into his new life, adding more friction to the already tense stalemate between Paul and Jack. As Olivia and Paul work together on an intriguing felony case, Jack lands an exclusive exposé for the Seattle paper. When Jeri refuses to run the story, Jack does everything he can to get it to print and preserve his integrity. Grace dives into wedding planning, but her enthusiasm is dampened by Maryellen's lack of support. Meanwhile, Alex asks Jack for a deeply personal favor that strains his romance with Olivia even more. Finally, when the residents of Cedar Cove meet on the field for a friendly game of baseball, it only takes a few curve balls for team captains Jack and Paul to see their competition goes beyond baseball and their unspoken feud could suddenly come to blows.
32	7	"Runaway"	Neill Fearnley	Story by : Sue Tenney; Teleplay by : Sue Tenney & Bruce Graham	August 29, 2015	3007	1.61
Jack and Olivia resolve to spend more time together, while Olivia makes sure to set Liz straight about her relationship status. When Liz meets Will, she asks Olivia to set them up on a tour of the town. Olivia is happy to give Liz a new distraction, but Paul is wary of Liz's true intentions and warns Olivia not to give his sister a reason to stay in town. As Paul schemes to stop Liz from doing any more damage, he reveals to Olivia the real reason he ran away from his hometown. Meanwhile, concerned about Maryellen, Grace tries to convince Cliff to elope as Maryellen turns to her friends to figure out how to cope with her mother's nuptials. Jack shows up to defend Jeri in a meeting with David, the owner of the Seattle Courier, but, just when Jack is prepared to lose his job, he finds out David has something else in mind. When Buck demands Warren join him on a special trip to rebuild their relationship, Warren learns Buck's efforts to be a better father are less than sincere. As Justine and her mother make a plan to fight Warren for ownership of the family property, Olivia is suddenly faced with the consequences of Will's disastrous real estate deal right in her own home.
33	8	"The Good Fight"	Andy Mikita	Amy Palmer Robertson	September 5, 2015	3008	1.58
Olivia vows to find a way to make her brother pull his own weight or move out of her home, as an oblivious Will starts to overstay his welcome and relies too heavily on her help. Jack tries to smooth things over at the Seattle Courier after he is offered Jeri's job, but, when she finds out, her anger at being ousted presents him with a test of loyalty. Meanwhile, Warren is upset after he finds out Olivia has sold her share of Charlotte's house to Buck behind his back – and Buck has no plans to negotiate. Then, Paul unwittingly agrees to a date with Alex, and his nervousness causes him to turn to Olivia for advice on dating after divorce. In the courthouse, Rebecca begins to burn out as she works long hours to prove to Paul she can take on bigger cases, but when she finally pushes herself too hard, her roommates are forced to intervene. Luke looks for the right time to share an important realization with Justine. Olivia supports Jack as he makes a final decision about his promotion, before they both discover it could have serious implications for their future.
34	9	"Engagements"	Andy Mikita	Amy Palmer Robertson	September 12, 2015	3009	1.75
Olivia and Jack consider the challenge of a long distance relationship, as Jack begins his new job as chief editor in Seattle. He soon finds himself at an impasse with his boss, David, who questions Jack's ability to meet his bottom line, causing an immediate rift. Meanwhile, Paul is avoiding a second date with Alex, as Olivia pressures him to take a chance on love. A vulnerable Paul finally confesses the surprising truth about his feelings. Justine wonders if Luke's decision about a future family is a deal breaker before making a confession of her own. Grace secretly plans her own wedding shower, and Rebecca shows a new side of herself when she sees the consequences of her obsessive overachieving at work. As Will promises to shape up in hopes of starting fresh with his sister, Olivia is cautiously optimistic until his latest mishap proves she was right all along. Then, just as Jack serves David an ultimatum, a couple's dispute in Olivia's courtroom prompts her to give her own relationship a chance before she asks Jack a loaded question.
35	10	"Getting To Know You, Part 1"	Martin Wood	Sue Tenney & Amy Palmer Robertson	September 19, 2015	3010	1.69
After Jack moves in, Olivia is unsettled while unpacking his boxes and realizes she knows so little about him. While she struggles to get him to open up, he is distracted with a new challenge in Seattle when David forces him to hire a young journalist. Meanwhile, after Justine bravely tells Luke that she loves him, he pulls away and hides a big decision from her. As Grace plans an extravagant wedding, an uneasy Cliff feels it is over-the-top and suggests something simple. She wonders if their differences are too great for their marriage to work. Peggy and Grace organize the annual Cedar Cove bike race in support of Ford's Warriors in Pink, which the whole town rallies to support. Paul sees Olivia and Jack working on making their relationship stronger, and he contemplates his future in Cedar Cove.
36	11	"Getting To Know You, Part 2"	Martin Wood	Sue Tenney & Amy Palmer Robertson	September 26, 2015	3011	2.05
Olivia is upset after learning Paul is leaving Cedar Cove, especially when he refuses to give her a reason. At home, she continues to work things out with Jack, as his reluctance to open himself up leaves her wanting more from their relationship. Meanwhile, Justine is sad when she learns that Luke wants to re-enlist in the Navy. When it doesn't go according to plan, Justine must decide if their romance is meant to last. Then, as Grace comes to a compromise with Cliff about their nuptials, she cannot hide her disapproval of Maryellen's own engagement, worrying her daughter will repeat her mistakes. Warren's scheme to send Buck out of town on a new deal backfires, while Linette learns the truth about Gloria's identity. When Grace's wedding day finally arrives, the whole town celebrates. Paul finally tells the truth about his decision, leaving Olivia and everyone in town with more questions than answers.
