= GQ India =

Indian edition of GQ

- Amitabh Bachchan on the June 2015 cover of GQ
- Editor: Che Kurrien
- Categories: Men's
- Frequency: Bi-Monthly
- Publisher: Gurdeep Singh Jujhar
- First issue: October 2008
- Company: Condé Nast India Pvt. Ltd. (Jujhar Group)
- Country: India
- Based in: Mumbai
- Language: English
- Website: www.gqindia.com

GQ is the Indian edition of the American monthly men's magazine called GQ. It is the 15th international edition of GQ and is published by Condé Nast India Pvt. Ltd., a 100% owned subsidiary of Condé Nast International. Condé Nast gained 100% ownership after regulatory changes in 2005 permitted 100% foreign direct investment in non-news and current affairs publications. GQ was the second magazine released in India, after Vogue India, that is 100% foreign owned. Condé Nast India is based in Mumbai and also has an office in New Delhi.

The magazine was launched with the October 2008 issue, which was unveiled by Condé Nast on 29 September 2008. The cover, shot by Pascal Chevallier, featured Saif Ali Khan and Katarina Ivanovska on the regular cover, and Yuvraj Singh, Lisa Haydon, Arjun Rampal and Ujjwala Raut on the gatefold cover.

== Awards ==
GQ India gives away a number of Awards in various fields. One popular award is the GQ Men of the year award.

== See also ==
- List of men's magazines
