= Dylan Neal =

Canadian actor (born 1969)

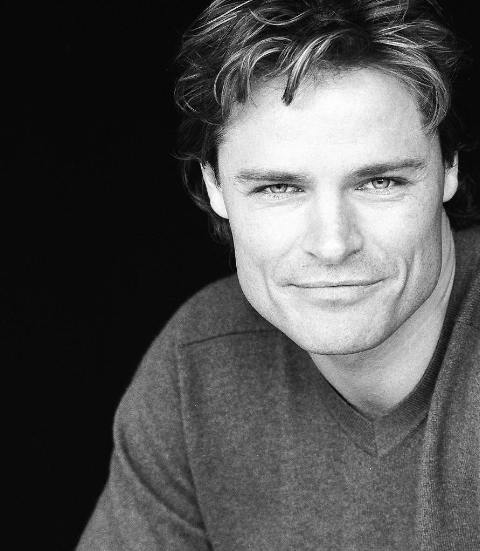
- Born: Dylan Jeremy Neal; October 8, 1969 (age 56); Richmond Hill, Ontario, Canada
- Occupation: Actor
- Years active: 1987–present
- Spouse: Becky Southwell (m. 1996)
- Children: 2

Dylan Jeremy Neal (born October 8, 1969) is a Canadian actor. He is known for his portrayal of the character Dylan Shaw on the soap opera The Bold and the Beautiful, Doug Witter on Dawson's Creek, and Detective Mike Celluci in the supernatural series Blood Ties. He also played Aaron Jacobs on Sabrina, the Teenage Witch.

In 2013, Neal landed the lead role opposite Andie MacDowell in the Hallmark Channel's first scripted TV series, Cedar Cove. The series premiered on July 20, 2013, and is based on the series of books by the same name, written by Debbie Macomber. In 2014, he sold a TV movie franchise to the newly rebranded Hallmark Movies and Mystery Channel and began writing, executive producing and starring as Henry Ross in Hallmark's original mystery series Gourmet Detective. Since 2018, Dylan has written, produced and starred in many Hallmark films.

== Personal life ==
Dylan Neal was born in Richmond Hill, Ontario, in 1969. Four months after his birth, his family moved to Oakville, Ontario. He attended Appleby College in Oakville and initially wanted to become a professional squash player.

Neal transferred to T. A. Blakelock High School in Oakville for his last two years of schooling. It was there that he gained an interest in the performing arts and participated in his school's drama program. On the advice of his drama teacher, Neal decided he wanted to make a career of acting.

Before becoming an actor, Neal was a caterer and delivered lunch baskets to private businesses in industrial areas around Toronto. He also delivered pizzas for a living before making it as an actor. He has been passionate about furniture making.

Neal is married to TV writer and producer Becky Southwell who has co-written some of the Gourmet Detective films with him. They were married on 21 September 1996 and have two children together.

== Career ==
Neal has said that after finishing his work on The Bold and the Beautiful, he was initially concerned about his ability to find another acting job. "There are certain expectations--or a certain lack of expectations--of soap opera actors," he said.

From 1998 to 2003, he portrayed Doug Witter, a small-town police officer, in the WB television drama Dawson's Creek. In the final season of the series, his character was revealed to be homosexual.

In 2000, Neal played a secret agent opposite Chuck Norris in the television film The President's Man. It premiered on April 2 on CBS.

In 2007, Neal played Detective Mike Celluci in Lifetime's Canadian vampire fantasy show Blood Ties, in which he starred alongside Christina Cox and Kyle Schmid. The producers of the show ultimately chose Neal, Cox, and Schmid as the three leads of the show over other auditioning actors after observing the natural chemistry among the trio. Neal later commented that fans often compliment the three actors for their charming on-screen chemistry and camaraderie.

Neal played the male lead opposite Andie MacDowell in the television series Cedar Cove for the Hallmark Channel. Neal played Jack Griffith, a Philadelphia reporter. He played Bob Adams, stepfather to the main character Anastasia Steele (Dakota Johnson), in the film adaptation Fifty Shades of Grey (2015).

Neal and his wife, Becky Southwell, write and produce their own projects through Southwell Neal Entertainment. They write and executive produce the Gourmet Detective original films for Hallmark Movies & Mysteries, based on the novels by Peter King. As of February 2020, Neal has made five television movies based on the character.

== Filmography ==
=== Films ===
Year	Title	Role	Notes
1993	I'll Never Get to Heaven	Carl	
1997	Taylor's Return	Robert	
2001	XCU: Extreme Close Up	Lew Constant	
2002	40 Days and 40 Nights	David	
2002	Landspeed	Young Brian Sanger	
2005	Locusts	Dan Dryer	Main role
2005	Mute	James	Short film
2005	Extreme Dating	Sean	
2010	Percy Jackson & the Olympians: The Lightning Thief	Hermes	
2010	The Traveler	Detective Alexander Black	
2010	My Family's Secret	Jason Darcie	
2015	Fifty Shades of Grey	Bob Adams	
2017	Fifty Shades Darker	Bob Adams	Unrated Edition
2018	Fifty Shades Freed	Bob Adams	
2018	BOULEVARD	Hayden Glass	short film

=== Television ===
Year	Title	Role	Notes
1988	Learning the Ropes	Student Hunk	
1988	Captain Power and the Soldiers of the Future	Jon Power	2 episodes
1988	Summer Storm		TV miniseries
1989	War of the Worlds	Scavenger 1	
1989	My Secret Identity	Sean Casey	
1990	E.N.G.	Kevin Wilkes	
1990	Prom Night III: The Last Kiss	Andrew Douglas	video
1990	Maniac Mansion	Bo Riddley	
1991	Top Cops	Robert Schaller/Ricky Grim/Corky	
1992	Catwalk		
1993	Sweating Bullets	River Rhodes	
1993	Class of '96	Phillip	
1993	Kung Fu: The Legend Continues	Jim Reardon	
1996	Golden Will: The Silken Laumann Story	John Wallace	TV movie
1994–96	The Bold and the Beautiful	Dylan Shaw	119 episodes
1997	Moloney		
1997	Life with Roger	Collin, the Exterminator	
1997	Pacific Palisades	Cory Robbins	7 episodes
1998	Profiler	Philip Nichols	
1998	Honey, I Shrunk the Kids: The TV Show	Roger Persimmons	
1998	Working	Royce	
1998	You Wish	Ken	
1998–1999	Hyperion Bay	Nick Sweeny	17 episodes
1998–2003	Dawson's Creek	Doug Witter	20 episodes
1999	JAG	Lt. Dalton "Boomer" Jonas	3 episodes
1999	It's Like, You Know...	Kevin	
2000	The President's Man	Sgt. Deke Slater	TV movie
2001	Thieves	Drew	
2002	Flatland	David White	
2002	Babylon 5: The Legend of the Rangers	David Martell	TV movie
2002	Relic Hunter	Zack	
2002	She Spies	Dr. Ellison	
2003	Sabrina, the Teenage Witch	Aaron Jacobs	10 episodes
2003	I'm with Her	John	
2004	LAX	Harley's Date	
2004	Kevin Hill	Trevor Mallard	
2005	Chupacabra Terror	Lance Thompson	video
2005	CSI: Miami	Patrick Hale	
2005	Vampire Bats	Dan Dryer	TV movie
2006	The War at Home	Dr. Jonathan Vogel	
2006	Cradle of Lies	Jack Collins	TV movie
2006	The Jake Effect	Robert	2 episodes
2007	No Brother of Mine	Stuart St. Clair	TV movie
2007	Matters of Life and Dating	Guy DeMayo	TV movie
2007–08	Blood Ties	Detective Mike Celluci	Main role, 22 episodes
2008	Psych	Jann	
2008	Stargate Atlantis	Dave Sheppard	
2009	The L Word	Caleb Cooper	2 episodes
2009	Wild Roses	Dillon Parker	8 episodes
2009	Storm Seekers	Ryan Stewart	TV movie
2009 & 2017	Murdoch Mysteries	Sergeant Jasper Linney	2 episodes
2009–10	Smallville	Ray Sacks	2 episodes
2010	Human Target	Wes Gibson	
2010	Life Unexpected	Bruce Jackson	
2011	He Loves Me	Nick	TV movie
2011	CSI: Crime Scene Investigation	Mr. Culver	
2011	Another Man's Wife	Brian Warner	TV movie
2011	Ice Road Terror	Neil Conroy	TV movie
2011	Rizzoli & Isles	Dr. Hanson/Russell Dempsey	
2011	A Trusted Man	Tom	TV movie
2011	Haven	Hugh Underwood	
2011	Flashpoint	Cpt. Simon Griggs	
2012	90210	William Paddington	
2012	Bones	Lt. Col. Ben Fordham	Season 8 Episode 6
2012	Ringer	Washburn Milter	Season 1 episode 21
2013–2015	Cedar Cove	Jack Griffith	Main role; Hallmark Channel series
2013	Bones	Ben Fordham	
2013–2014	Arrow	Professor Ivo	7 episodes
2014	A Wife's Nightmare	Gabe	Lifetime TV movie
2015–2017; 2020	Gourmet Detective film series	Henry Ross	Also writer and executive producer; Hallmark movies
2016	Looks Like Christmas	Terry Evans	Hallmark movie
2018	Truly, Madly, Sweetly	Eric	Hallmark movie
2020	Christmas She Wrote	Tripp	Hallmark movie
2021	9-1-1	Dr. Sampson	1 episode
2023	Ride	Daniel Booker	4 episodes
