= Gourmet Detective =

American television series

- Genre: Mystery film
- Based on: series by Peter King
- Written by: Becky Southwell; Dylan Neal; Dawn DeKeyser
- Directed by: Scott Smith; Terry Ingram; Mark Jean
- Starring: Dylan Neal; Brooke Burns
- Music by: James Jandrisch; Jeff Tymoschuk
- Countries of origin: United States; Canada
- Original language: English

Production
- Executive producers: Becky Southwell; Dylan Neal; Michael Prupas; Steve Valentine; Joel S. Rice
- Producers: Harvey Kahn; Charles Cooper
- Running time: 83–84 minutes
- Production company: Muse Entertainment

Original release
- Network: Hallmark Movies & Mysteries
- Release: May 16, 2015 – January 19, 2020

Gourmet Detective is a series of made-for-television mystery films based on a book series of the same name from author Peter King that stars Dylan Neal as Henry Ross, a chef turned culinary sleuth and Brooke Burns as Detective Maggie Price. Set in San Francisco, it airs on Hallmark Movies & Mysteries in the US.

== Cast ==
- Dylan Neal as Henry "Gourmet Detective" Ross, a charming, single chef, gourmet consultant, and famous blogger. While assisting the police in investigating a murder at a restaurant, he demonstrates a useful investigative insight, and becomes an official police consultant on relevant cases.
- Brooke Burns as Detective Maggie Price, a leading detective with the Homicide Division in the San Francisco Police Department
- Matthew Kevin Anderson as Munro, part of Detective Price's team
- Marc Senior (films 1–4) and Alex Barima (film 5) as Bailey, part of Detective Price's team
- Samantha Ferris as Captain Forsyth, Captain of the Homicide Division and Maggie's boss who first hires Henry as a consultant on one of the cases
- Ali Skovbye as Abigail, Maggie's daughter who, until the fifth film, is a teenage girl living with her mother
- Christine Willes as Doris, Maggie's mother who lives with her
- Shannon Chan-Kent as Lucy, Henry's devoted assistant
- Brenda Crichlow (films 1–4) and Lossen Chambers (film 5) as Dr. Erica Nolan, the Medical Examiner who works with the Police Department
- Bruce Boxleitner as Jim Ross, Henry's father who was a retired policemen

Characters in each film
Character	Title				
Character	Gourmet Detective	A Healthy Place to Die	Death Al Dente	Eat, Drink, and Be Buried	Roux the Day
Henry Ross	Dylan Neal	Dylan Neal	Dylan Neal	Dylan Neal	Dylan Neal
Det. Maggie Price	Brooke Burns	Brooke Burns	Brooke Burns	Brooke Burns	Brooke Burns
Munro	Matthew Kevin Anderson	Matthew Kevin Anderson	Matthew Kevin Anderson	Matthew Kevin Anderson	Matthew Kevin Anderson
Bailey	Marc Senior	Marc Senior	Marc Senior	Marc Senior	Alex Barima
Capt. Forsyth	Samantha Ferris	Samantha Ferris	Samantha Ferris	Samantha Ferris	Samantha Ferris
Abigail	Ali Skovbye	Ali Skovbye	Ali Skovbye	Ali Skovbye	Ali Skovbye
Doris	Christine Willes	Christine Willes	Christine Willes	Christine Willes	—N/a
Lucy	Shannon Chan-Kent	Shannon Chan-Kent	—N/a	Shannon Chan-Kent	—N/a
Dr. Erica Nolan	Brenda Crichlow	Brenda Crichlow	Brenda Crichlow	Brenda Crichlow	Lossen Chambers
Jim Ross	—N/a	—N/a	—N/a	Bruce Boxleitner	Bruce Boxleitner

== Production and filming ==
The series is filmed in Vancouver, British Columbia, with production based in Victoria on Vancouver Island. The first film in the series featured the English Inn in Esquimalt as a five-star restaurant. Scenes from the fourth film in the series, Eat, Drink and Be Buried were filmed in Oak Bay and near Trafalgar Park.

== Films ==
No.	Title	Directed by	Written by	Original release date
1	"Gourmet Detective"	Scott Smith	Becky Southwell, Dylan Neal	May 16, 2015
Maggie Price is a tough workaholic detective with the San Francisco Police Department and works in the homicide division. Recently divorced, she lives with her mother and thirteen-year-old daughter Abigail. A casual date turns into an encounter with the gourmet detective Henry Ross, who portrays himself as a charming and confident man with a refined taste for food. They are thrown together when an investigative journalist dies at a restaurant owned by Henry's friend. All guests are suspects, including Henry, but he is paired up with Detective Maggie Price because he knows everyone and everything about the food industry in town.
2	"Gourmet Detective: A Healthy Place to Die"	Scott Smith	Dawn DeKeyser, Becky Southwell, Dylan Neal	August 2, 2015
Forced to take a vacation, Detective Maggie Price reluctantly accompanies Henry to a spa resort where Henry and other chefs are presenting their work at a conference. Henry meets journalist Kathleen Evans who has something to tell him but she goes missing the same night. Henry and Maggie must work quietly to catch the unsuspecting culprit as secrets, affairs, and scandals emerge.
3	"Death Al Dente: A Gourmet Detective Mystery"	Terry Ingram	Becky Southwell, Dylan Neal	October 9, 2016
Henry's friend and restaurateur Leo owns the hottest Italian restaurant in town but it is evident he doesn't get along with his star head chef Matteo. After a break-in at the restaurant, Leo ends up dead with Henry and Maggie working the case. Tensions between them increase as their exes reappear. Both are forced to question their feelings for each other while the case leads them to Leo's family treasure.
4	"Gourmet Detective: Eat, Drink, and Be Buried"	Mark Jean	Becky Southwell, Dylan Neal	October 8, 2017
Henry and Maggie have been together for three months now. They attend a wealthy businessman and Henry's friend, David Weston's birthday party where Henry is catering food. During an enactment of a scene from the eighteenth century, a fake gun ends up killing one of David's four children. It is up to Henry and Maggie to find the killer as it gets likelier that they may be a family member, and that other family members may also be in danger. Meanwhile, Henry's father drops in, forcing Henry to face more awkward memories such as the death of his mother and his issues with celebrating his birthday.
5	"Roux the Day: A Gourmet Detective Mystery"	Mark Jean	Dylan Neal, Becky Southwell	January 19, 2020
Henry is hired to authenticate and purchase a long lost and very valuable recipe book. Soon Henry and Maggie find themselves in a murder mystery where secrets hidden within the treasured book have dire consequences for all who own it.
