= The Third Half =

- Directed by: Darko Mitrevski
- Screenplay by: Grgur Strujic and Darko Mitrevski
- Based on: World War 2 events
- Produced by: Robert Naskov, Darko Mitrevski, Nuala Quinn-Barton
- Starring: Sasko Kocev; Katarina Ivanovska; Richard Sammel; Rade Šerbedžija; Emil Ruben; Mitko S. Apostolovski
- Cinematography: Klaus Fuxjager
- Edited by: Dejan Boskovic
- Music by: Kiril Džajkovski
- Production company: Kino Oko Production
- Release dates: 21 May 2012 (Cannes); 15 September 2012 ("Manaki Brothers" Film Festival)
- Running time: 113 minutes
- Country: North Macedonia
- Languages: Macedonian; German; Bulgarian; Serbian; Ladino; English
- Budget: €2,150,000

The Third Half (Macedonian: Трето полувреме [ˈtrɛtɔ pɔˈɫuvrɛmɛ]) is a 2012 Macedonian war drama film directed by Darko Mitrevski. It deals with Macedonian football during World War II and the deportation of Jews from Macedonia. It is a story of love during wartime and a country's passion for football. The government of Macedonia considered the film of national interest and funded it with one million euros. The Third Half was selected as the Macedonian entry for Best Foreign Language at the 85th Academy Awards. The film has been criticized in Bulgaria for its depiction of the country and Bulgarians.

== Plot ==
The film is set in what is today North Macedonia, then part of the Vardar Banovina, a province in Kingdom Yugoslavia, and follows the period shortly after the Tripartite Pact invasion of the region. In 1941, a young football player from Macedonia, Kosta, and a wealthy young Jewish woman, Rebecca, fall in love, despite her father's effort to keep them apart. With the war raging around their borders, the Macedonians remain cocooned in their world of patriotic pleasures, primarily concerned about getting the beleaguered Macedonia Football Club on a winning streak. Their manager hires the legendary German-Jewish coach Rudolph Spitz to turn them into champions. However, when the Nazi occupation begins and they start deporting Jews, Kosta and his teammates realize that the carefree days of their youth are over. As the Nazis try to sabotage the outcome of the championship game, and Spitz's life is threatened, Kosta and his teammates rise to the challenge to protect their coach, with all of Macedonia cheering them on.

== Background ==
The Third Half depicts the history of 7,148 Macedonian Jews who were deported to the gas chambers of Treblinka by the Bulgarian administrative and military authorities, who were cooperating with the Nazi regime. In February 1943, Bulgaria and Germany signed an agreement stipulating the deportation of Bulgarian Jews to camps in Poland. In March 1943, Bulgarian police rounded up the Jews of Thrace and Macedonia at night and placed them in detention camps under extremely harsh conditions. Their property and their houses were confiscated prior to their deportation in late March. Sealed trains transported 11,384 Jews, mainly via the Danube River, to death camps, from which almost none returned. The film was inspired by the true story of the FC Macedonia football team. The film is based also on an interview with the Shoah Foundation on that story given in 1998 by Neta Cohen, a Macedonian Holocaust survivor, with the character Rebecca Cohen created on the basis of her life. The character Rudolph Spitz was created on the basis of the life and career of the Jewish coach of FC Macedonia Illés Spitz, who is also a Macedonian Holocaust survivor and was rescued by the Bulgarian club's managers.

== Cast ==
- Sasko Kocev as Kosta
- Katarina Ivanovska as Rebecca Cohen
  - Bedija Begovska as Rebecca in 2012
- Richard Sammel as Rudolph Spitz, a Prussian footballer-turned-coach hired to coach FC Macedonia
- Rade Šerbedžija as Don Rafael Cohen, a wealthy Jewish banker and Rebecca's father
- Emil Ruben as Garvanov, a Bulgarian colonel
- Mitko S. Apostolovski as Dimitrija, the owner of FC Macedonia
- Toni Mihajlovski as Pancho
- Igor Angelov as Afrika
- Gorast Cvetkovski as Skeptic
- Oliver Mitkovski as Jordan
- Igor Stojchevski as Cezar
- Dimitrija Doksevski as Gengys
- Bajram Severdzan as Choro
- Whitney Montgomery as Rachel, Rebecca's granddaughter
- Zvezda Angelovska as Blagunja, Pancho's wife
- Verica Nedeska as Zamila, Rebecca's friend
- Petre Arsovski as Papas, Dimitrija's friend
- Meto Jovanovski as a rabbi
- Salaetin Bilal as a shoemaker
- Petar Mircevski as a barber

== Production ==
The film was supported by the Macedonian Film Fund, the Holocaust Fund of the Jews from Macedonia, the Jewish Community of Macedonia, the Czech State Fund and the then Macedonian Prime Minister Nikola Gruevski. It was declared a film of national interest by the Macedonian Government. The total budget numbered €2,150,000. The film was shot in Skopje, Bitola and Ohrid. Filming took place between 10 September and 27 October 2011. Gruevski visited the shooting site in October 2011. The film was released in September 2012 and had its official premiere in the Millennium Cinema in Skopje.

== Reception ==
Writing for Cineuropa, Vladan Petković stated that The Third Half was the most ambitious Macedonian film since Before the Rain (1994). He went on to praise the setting, lauding the director for managing to "put together all the complicated details of the period and the geopolitical situation". Petković highlighted Sammel's acting as the strongest and dubbed it "the real emotional anchor of the film". At Bitola's 33rd Manaki Brothers film festival, it received a standing ovation.

The film was selected as the Macedonian entry for the Best Foreign Language Oscar at the 85th Academy Awards, but it did not make the final cut for nomination.

=== Depiction of Bulgaria and Bulgarians ===
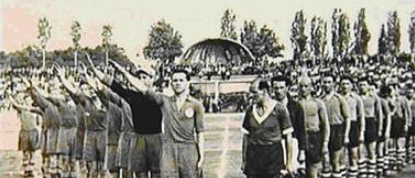
Photo from before the beginning of the football match on 29 March 1942 in Skopje between the teams of 'Makedonia Skopie' and 'Levski Sofia'. Levski's players, who refused to give a fascist salute, are watching their colleagues from Skopje doing it. The depiction of the match in the film has been subject to criticism in Bulgaria.

Evgeni Kirilov, Andrey Kovatchev and Stanimir Ilchev—Bulgarian members of the European Parliament—expressed outrage over the film due to its depiction of Bulgarians during World War II as fascists and called upon European Commissioner for Enlargement Štefan Füle to reprove the Republic of Macedonia over the film. They claimed the film was an "attempt to manipulate Balkan history" and "spread hate" on the part of the Republic of Macedonia against its neighbors. The director of the film denied the accusations; he described the reactions as "foolish" and denounced what he referred to as "Goebbels-like production machinery" to deny Bulgaria's role in the Holocaust. The film also caused controversy among Bulgarian political and media circles due to its depiction of Bulgaria. Another issue among Bulgarians was the incorrect depiction of the Bulgarian flag with a swastika. The film is regarded as a peak in the anti-Bulgarian campaign of Gruevski by Bulgaria.

In late November 2011, the Macedonian media alleged that Member of the European Parliament Doris Pack, of Germany, dismissed the Bulgarian politicians' criticism of the film. Subsequently, in an extraordinary meeting of the EU Committee on Foreign Affairs attended by the Foreign Minister of the Republic of Macedonia, Doris Pack denied this allegation.

In the 2021 documentary, The Last Half, Bulgarian director Stepan Polyakov has argued that the screenplay of the film The Third Half differs significantly from the real events Mitrevski claims to reflect, and it even openly manipulates them. Historian Stefan Detchev wrote that The Last Half "went to unheard of extremes in erasing the persecution of Jews in the Second World War and the Bulgarian complicity in their deportation from Macedonia. In the end, the aim was to completely whitewash the image of Tsar Boris III and the Bulgarian authorities at the time". Per Detchev, The Third Half suggested that Bulgaria is exceptionally responsible for the deportation of the Jews and portrayed the Bulgarians as bloodthirsty. The Germans were also not present in the film, while the Nazi power was associated with the Bulgarians. On 29 March 1942, before the match in Skopje with FC Macedonia, Levski's players refused to perform the fascist salute. Later Levski was fined 10,000 Bulgarian levs by the Football Federation for not performing the salute. According to Polyakov, the truth about this incident is distorted in the film.

== See also ==
- The Holocaust in Bulgaria
- List of submissions to the 85th Academy Awards for Best Foreign Language Film
- List of Macedonian submissions for the Academy Award for Best Foreign Language Film
