= Locusts (2005 film) =

2005 American television film by David Jackson

- Also known as: Locusts: Day of Destruction
- Genre: Natural horror
- Written by: Doug Prochilo
- Directed by: David Jackson
- Starring: Lucy Lawless; Dylan Neal; John Heard; Gregory Alan Williams
- Music by: Joseph LoDuca
- Country of origin: United States

Production
- Cinematography: Derick V. Underschultz
- Editor: Louis Cioffi
- Running time: 95 minutes

Original release
- Network: CBS
- Release: April 24, 2005

Locusts (also called Locusts: Day of Destruction outside the United States) is a natural horror television film directed by David Jackson, and starring Lucy Lawless, Dylan Neal, John Heard and Gregory Alan Williams as a group of scientists, farmers and government officials as they attempt to stop a swarm of genetically engineered locusts from devouring the United States. It aired on CBS on April 24, 2005. It was followed by a sequel called Vampire Bats, which aired CBS on October 30, 2005.

== Plot ==
At a United States Department of Agriculture (USDA) lab within the Virginia Institute of Agriculture (VIA), Gina feeds a swarm of Australian plague locusts, which have been sealed off in a glass room. The locusts descend on her when she enters the room without a protective suit. Gina escapes with the help of her boyfriend Willy, both shaken by what they have witnessed.

In Georgetown, Washington D.C., Dr. Maddy Rierdon receives a phone call from her assistant, Vivian, who tells her that a lab at the VIA has been red flagged by the Government Accountability Office (GAO). When Vivian discovers the information is classified, Maddy requests to meet her outside the VIA. Maddy discovers that Lab C-12 is being overseen by her current boss, Dr. Peter Axelrod. At the lab, Peter extracts one of the locusts from the glass room and squirts it with DDT. The insect is only briefly immobilized, but recovers in mere seconds. He reveals to Maddy that the locusts, which are hybrids crossed with the desert locust, are his own creation. Maddy orders the locusts exterminated and fires Peter. A small number of locusts are saved in a tube labeled "biohazard". During the clean-up process, the exterminator accidentally drops the jar in the sink, causing several of them to escape down the drain. The exterminator flees before his mistake can be discovered. Later, at Andrews Air Force Base in Maryland, the exterminator brings the remaining insects in a sealed metal case to a waiting officer, who delivers them on a military plane bound for Beale Air Force Base in California. When the case is offloaded onto an army truck, the officer handling it is attacked by an unknown insect, causing him to drop the case on the runway. When the army truck goes around to retrieve it, they accidentally run it over, destroying the box and releasing the last four insects.

Maddy's boyfriend, Dr. Dan Dryer, breaks up with her after she spends too much time away from home. One month later, Maddy discovers she is pregnant and tries to call Dan, but he is too busy. Maddy heads to California with the USDA Voracious Insect Mobile Research Lab on another mission. Meanwhile, a couple camping by the American River in California flee after discovering their tent is saturated with a swarm of sleeping locusts. A few hours later, the same swarm descends on the Napa Valley as a large black cloud. Maddy sees the swarm flying overhead and decides to track where the locusts are heading. The hybrid locusts also reach Leesburg, Virginia, where Peter lives with his family. The locusts swarm a school bus, attacking the children inside and knocking them unconscious. Peter arrives at the scene and takes his daughter Sofia to the hospital. Back in Napa Valley, Maddy and her team are on the scene of the earlier swarm's attack on the farm, revealing the locusts have stripped every single bush and tree down to the bark.

At the United Nations Field Office in Washington D.C., Dan calls Maddy after receiving a "locust infestation advisory" alert on his computer. Maddy reveals she issued the warning. They begin to reconcile, but Maddy is called away by the Secretary of Agriculture before they can finish. Meanwhile, at the hospital, Peter and his wife Terry look after Sofia, who is now comatose. Maddy calls the United States Weather Service in Oklahoma for an update on weather patterns to try to predict the two swarms' next movement. The USWS predicts the Virginia swarm will head towards the city of Pittsburgh in the coming hours, but mentions that they also gave Peter the same information.

Peter calls Maddy, who is now in Visalia, California, and tells her his locusts are causing the attacks. She refuses his help, wanting him as far from the locusts as possible. Maddy and her team begin to evacuate a local citrus festival in advance of the locusts' arrival, but Vivian reveals the swarm is just minutes away. Both the festival and the team are attacked by the swarm, while a dropped video camera records the event. Meanwhile, the swarm reaches Pittsburgh, creating pandemonium in the streets. At Pittsburgh International Airport, the lead air traffic controller ignores Peter's warning to prevent planes from flying north east. A cargo plane runs into the swarm, which causes its engines to overload. The plane crashes in a fiery explosion just yards from the end of the runway.

Back in Virginia, Peter and Terry learn about the locusts' attack on the citrus festival. Peter admits to Terry that the locusts are his. A group of FBI agents arrive at the hospital to take Peter into federal custody. Meanwhile, at the Department for Homeland Security, a meeting takes place between Maddy, her boss Secretary Morales, General Miller, Senator Clauson, Director Rusk, and Secretary for the Department of Energy Lorelei Wentworth to determine the course of action required. General Miller is not convinced the locusts are a threat, but changes his mind when he sees the evidence. Dan, who is also at the meeting, recommends bringing in the harvest early across the country to try and starve the locusts. Director Rusk receives a call stating the eastern swarm of locusts have now turned carnivorous. At Maddy's request, Vivian locates Peter, who is being held at Fort Douglas. Maddy convinces General Miller to help her speak to Peter. They travel to Fort Douglas, where Peter reveals to Maddy that the FBI plan to use VX nerve gas on the locusts to destroy them. Maddy reluctantly boards a helicopter with General Miller and Peter for a test run over the eastern swarm in Ohio. Miller promises Maddy the gas will only be used in rural areas with little to no population. She discreetly makes a call to the news regarding the VX nerve gas test run. However, when they are airborne, the USWS informs the group that the swarm over Ohio they would be targeting has moved towards southern Indiana. Miller continues to press ahead with the plans. Maddy, desperate, begins using a wrench to smash the VX container onboard the helicopter, forcing Miller to turn around before the gas is released. When the press picks up on the test run, the helicopter is ordered to leave the area, to Miller's chagrin.

Maddy calls Dan, asking him to check on her grandfather, Lyle, whose farm is in Indiana and thus right in the path of the locusts. Lyle begins gathering the cattle and moving them indoors, with help from Maddy, Peter and Dan. They take shelter in a metal grain silo just before the locusts arrive. Maddy decides to use the generator inside the silo to send an electric current to the outside of the solo, hopefully killing the locusts. However, the generator has no fuel. Peter volunteers to get the fuel, which is on the other side of the farm, and gets attacked by the swarm. Although he makes it back inside, he dies from his injuries. Lyle loads up the generator and Dan attaches the cables to the metal shell of the silo, sending a powerful current through it, killing the locusts. Armed with the knowledge on how to kill them, Dan and Maddy race back to Washington D.C. before the VX gas is used again.

At the Department for Homeland Security, they attempt to convince Secretary Morales and the others to destroy the locusts by using electricity. Wentworth defends Dan and Maddy, and suggests that if the United States switches off their electricity, Wentworth can re-route the unused power through the Continental Power Grids, which both swarms are currently approaching. As the locusts are attracted to bright light, Maddy calls the USWS again, who agree to launch weather balloons near the power lines in an attempt to attract them. At dawn the next day, power is switched off throughout the United States and rerouted to the two power lines, one each in western and eastern America. Meanwhile, preparations continue in Utah for a launch of VX gas should the electricity plan fail. Maddy and Dan arrive at one of the two sites, and instruct the Air Force to move the weather balloons closer to the power lines. Maddy and Dan reconcile, but are forced to take cover in their car when the swarm arrives. Wentworth activates the power grid, and the swarms fly into the massively amplified power cables. The cables burst into flames with the amount of current, exploding the transformers. However, the plan succeeds, and the locusts are destroyed.

One year later, Maddy and Dan have a child together. Maddy maintains a better work-life balance.

== Cast ==
- Lucy Lawless as Dr. Maddy Rierdon
- Dylan Neal as Dr. Dan Dryer
- John Heard as Dr. Peter Axelrod
- Gregory Alan Williams as General Miller
- Mike Farrell as Lyle Rierdon
- Natalija Nogulich as Lorelei Wentworth
- Mike Gomez as Secretary Morales
- Esperanza Catubig as Vivian
- Sam Temeles as Wyatt Reynolds
- Mark Costello as Director Rusk
- Margaret Lawhon as Senator Clauson
- Caroline McKinley as Terry Axelrod
- D.J. Dierker as Jonas Hanauer
- Nicolas Roye as Jimmy
- Drew Seeley as Willy
- Joel Steingold as Cargo Pilot
- Chaz Roberson as School Bus Driver
- Jenna Hildebrand as Sofia Axelrod
- Lara Grice as Felicia
- Amanda Baker as Gina
- Greg Corbett as Karl
- Azure Parsons as Stacy
- Marcus Lyle Brown as FBI Agent
- Wayne Ferrara as Military Officer
- Dave Nemeth as Newscaster
- Abdoulaye Camara as African Translator
- Mikki Val as Ruby

== Reception ==
The film received generally negative reviews from critics. The Wisconsin State Journal characterised it plainly as "bad". However, Newsday rejoiced that locusts were finally given again a role in films. A review of another 2005 production on the same theme, Locusts: The 8th Plague, states that the latter, "(U)nlike CBS's own locusts run amok flick from earlier this year, (...) promises you killer locusts and delivers just that quite frequently and quite bloody too."
