= St Charles Catholic Sixth Form College =

Location
- 74 St Charles' Square; North Kensington; London, W10 6EY; England; 51.52133°N 0.21514°W

Information
- Type: Sixth form & FE college
- Religious affiliation: Roman Catholic
- Established: 1955 (boys school); 1990 (present)
- Local authority: Kensington and Chelsea
- Department for Education URN: 130411 Tables
- Ofsted: Reports
- Gender: Coeducational
- Age: 16++
- Website: http://www.stcharles.ac.uk

St Charles Catholic Sixth Form College is a Roman Catholic sixth form college located in the Royal Borough of Kensington and Chelsea, in West London, England. It was originally Cardinal Manning Boys School, founded in 1955 and became St Charles Catholic Sixth Form College in 1990 following a reorganisation of the Catholic education system within the Archdiocese. It is part of a cluster of Catholic institutions located at St Charles Square which includes All Saints Catholic College (formerly Sion Manning Roman Catholic Girls' School), St Charles Primary School, a church and a Carmelite convent.

== Academics ==
The college offers a range of courses for students graduating from local schools in the surrounding area. These courses include GCSEs, A Levels and BTECs.

== Alumni ==
- Albert Shepherd (1936-2019) - actor
- Richard Belmar (b. 1979) - held in extrajudicial detention in the Guantanamo Bay detention camp
- Femi Oyeniran (b.1986) - actor and director
