= Homecoming (2009 film) =

2009 American independent horror-thriller film by Morgan J. Freeman

- Theatrical release poster
- Directed by: Morgan J. Freeman
- Written by: Katie L. Fetting; Jake Goldberger; Frank Hannah
- Produced by: Bingo Gubelmann; Jack Heller; Bill Papariella; Austin Stark; James M. Young; Anthony Pittore; Nuala Quinn-Barton
- Starring: Mischa Barton; Matt Long; Jessica Stroup
- Cinematography: Stephen Kazmierski
- Edited by: Keith Reamer
- Music by: Peter Nashel; Jack Livesey
- Distributed by: Animus Films
- Release date: July 17, 2009
- Running time: 88 minutes
- Country: United States
- Language: English
- Budget: $1.5 million
- Box office: $8.5 million

Homecoming is a 2009 American independent horror-thriller film, directed by Morgan J. Freeman and written by Katie L. Fetting, Jake Goldberger and Frank Hannah. The film follows a student couple, Mike (Matt Long) and Elizabeth (Jessica Stroup), on their homecoming. Elizabeth is taken home by Mike's ex-girlfriend Shelby (Mischa Barton) after a road accident. Shelby is soon revealed to be fixated on Mike and subsequently treats Elizabeth in a cruel and deranged manner. The film was poorly received by critics but was a box office success, grossing $8.5 million against a $1.5 million budget.

== Plot ==
The film begins with Shelby (Mischa Barton) driving at night while crying and smoking a cigarette, which she drops. She then hits someone who was standing in the path of the car.

Mike (Matt Long), Shelby's ex-boyfriend, and his new girlfriend, Elizabeth (Jessica Stroup), are preparing to go to Mt. Bliss, Mike's hometown, because the football team is retiring his jersey. Shelby has problems with the bank about the bowling alley she inherited from her mother and believes that she and Mike are still an item. After the football game Mike and Elizabeth decide to go to Shelby's bowling alley. When Shelby sees Mike, she kisses him, but Mike tells her that he has a new girlfriend.

Shelby befriends Elizabeth and after a few tequila shots, a drunk Elizabeth says she is going to meet Mike's parents after. Shelby then tells her that Mike's parents are over-judgmental, making Elizabeth nervous. Wanting to give a good first impression to Mike's parents, Elizabeth decides to go to a motel and sleep her intoxication off, so gets driven to the nearest one from Mike's policeman cousin Billy. As she arrives at check-in, the man behind the counter tells her that there are not any rooms left because of the homecoming football games and the nearest motel is four miles away. Mike goes home to see his mother, who tells him that one of her friends said his new girlfriend got drunk at the alley. Mike tells her that since Elizabeth wanted to make a good impression, she decided to stay at a motel. Mike's mother questions him why Elizabeth would think that, implying that Shelby lied to Elizabeth.

Elizabeth begins to walk up the road, looking for someone to drive her to the motel. While driving, Shelby is now crying and smoking a cigarette as seen at the beginning of the film. Elizabeth tries to flag the car down and becomes the person Shelby hits. After the crash, Shelby takes her home with her. At her house, Shelby cares for Elizabeth by using some medical supplies left over from when her mother was sick.

The next morning Mike tries to call Elizabeth but her phone goes to voicemail. Elizabeth then wakes up in Shelby's house. Confused, she asks Shelby what happened. Fearing that she would go to jail for hitting Elizabeth, Shelby tells her that she found her in the road as a victim of a hit and run. Elizabeth suffered extensive bruising and a broken ankle. Shelby tells Elizabeth that she left a message on Mike's voicemail telling him where Elizabeth was, which is a lie. Shelby then sedates Elizabeth.

Shelby then walks to her bowling alley to get Elizabeth's car. Elizabeth wakes up and hobbles to Shelby's bedroom. She finds it covered in pictures of Mike and Shelby when they were still together with "SM + MD" written everywhere. Shelby returns and Elizabeth hobbles back to her room but accidentally detaches a photo strip of Shelby and Mike from the wall in her haste. Shelby finds it and realizes Elizabeth has been in her room. As a punishment she dislocates Elizabeth's bad foot. Mike and Billy go to the motel where Billy dropped her off and the receptionist tells him that Elizabeth never checked in. They then go to the bowling alley where Elizabeth left her car and see that is no longer there since Shelby stole it and hid it in her barn. Shelby looks through Elizabeth's suitcase and takes a gift that was intended for Mike, planning to give the gift to him as her own.

Billy later tries to convince Mike to take Shelby back, since she still loved him even after he rejected her numerous times. Mike does agree, however, to go out for drinks that night. At the bar, Mike sees Shelby there and follows her to the bathroom. Shelby and Mike begin to passionately kiss, but Mike says that he cannot cheat on Elizabeth even though she seems to have deserted him. He leaves Shelby in the bathroom where she begins to cry.

The next day, Mike, thinking Elizabeth left him for her ex-boyfriend, gets a text from Shelby on Elizabeth's phone saying too much is happening too fast. He lies on the couch looking at his phone's display of "No New Messages".

Elizabeth finds herself locked in the bathroom. After rummaging around, she discovers taped to the inside of the cistern lid Polaroid pictures of Shelby's mother dying, revealing that Shelby had killed her. There is also a paper titled "Poisonous Plants" and a form showing that no autopsy had been performed at Shelby's request. Fearing her own murder is approaching, Elizabeth scours the bathroom looking for a way out. She finds a screwdriver and uses it on the door to escape.

Shelby gets home from visiting Mike to give him his jacket and opens the bathroom door to find the room empty. She turns around to be met by the cistern lid in Elizabeth's hands. Elizabeth takes Shelby's jacket and hobbles down the stairs, out the front door into the barn, where she finds her locked car. In frustration, Elizabeth hits her car causing the alarm to sound. Shelby runs to the barn and subdues Elizabeth. Shelby calls her a "stupid bitch" and pulls the car keys from the jacket's pocket. She then ties up Elizabeth with duct tape. While she's lying on the floor, Elizabeth tells Shelby that she knows about her mother. Elizabeth tells her that her parents are rich and promises to run away and not tell anyone if Shelby will release Elizabeth and accept money from her parents. Shelby ignores her and uses pruners to cut out Elizabeth's Achilles' tendons. Shelby then gags Elizabeth and locks her in the basement.

Mike prepares for the ceremony to retire his football jersey, wearing the jacket that Shelby gave him. Billy stops by Shelby's house to see if she wanted a ride. While Shelby is talking to Billy, Elizabeth manages to shut off the power. Billy offers to fix it, but Shelby dismisses his offer, saying she shall do it later. Billy insists and enters the basement with his flashlight, seeing Elizabeth bound and gagged. Shelby creeps down behind him, strikes him in the chest with an axe and takes his gun. She shoots him dead, puts his body in a barrel and burns it.

At the high school where Mike is being honored, he stands in the bathroom and takes off his jacket, only to see Elizabeth's initials on it. Realizing that Shelby had stolen the jacket, he thinks that Shelby must also be holding Elizabeth captive. He runs to her house to confront her where he hears Elizabeth in the basement and goes down to her. After a short standoff, Shelby shoots him in the leg. An altercation follows, resulting in Shelby fainting. He carries Elizabeth upstairs and stops to rest in the kitchen.

Shelby comes up and after more fighting is attacked by Elizabeth with Mike's football helmet. He tells her to stop, and when she does, Shelby reaches for her gun. Elizabeth then continues to beat her with the helmet. After that, Mike picks Elizabeth off her feet and carries her out.

The film fades to a home video of Shelby and Mike kissing and laughing about turning off the camera. The final shot is of Shelby's eyes opening, revealing that she is still alive.

== Cast ==
- Mischa Barton as Shelby Mercer
- Matt Long as Michael Kevin Donaldson
- Jessica Stroup as Elizabeth Mitchum
- Michael Landes as Billy Fletcher
- Allen Williamson as Adams
- Joshua Elijah Reese as Billick
- Nick Pasqual as Davis
- Joe Forgione as Elfman
- Emily Martin as Posse Girl
- Olivia Duball as Posse Girl
- Mark Lawrence as Mark

== Production ==
On November 12, 2007, Mischa Barton was cast in the film. On December 19, 2007, Matt Long, Jessica Stroup and Michael Landes were also cast. The film was shot in the Pittsburgh metropolitan area. The film's New York-based production company, Paper Street Films, was drawn to the region due to Pennsylvania's tax incentive program for films. Shady Side Academy, North Allegheny High School, a community center in Midway, PA, and a farm in Bell Township served as locations. Filming ended on January 18, 2008. A trailer was released on February 29, 2008.

== Reception ==
=== Box office ===
Homecoming was a box office success but a critical failure. The film grossed US$8.5 million. The budget of the film was estimated at US$1.5 million.

=== Critical response ===
The film was panned by critics. It holds a 0% approval rating on Rotten Tomatoes based on 23 reviews, with an average rating of 3.3/10. The website's critics consensus reads: "A lazy collection of obsession thriller clichés, Homecoming will leave viewers wishing they'd opted for a lopsided football game and some awkward dancing instead." According to Metacritic, which collected 6 reviews and calculated a score of 21 out of 100, the film received "generally unfavorable" reviews.

Robert Abele of the Los Angeles Times gave it 1.5/5 stars, saying that it "feels a little thin for date night heartbeat-racing, neither trashy nor self-consciously funny enough to make its genre-trapped ludicrousness sing." Alonso Duralde of MSNBC gave it 2/5 stars, calling it a rehash of Misery and writing: "You can tell where this is all going, and the familiarity wouldn't be so bad if this cast could have some fun with the cliches."

== Release ==
The film opened on July 17, 2009 in New York City and Los Angeles and the release was expanded in subsequent weeks. It was released on DVD firstly in Canada on March 23, 2010 and then on April 27, 2010 in the United States.

== See also ==
- List of films with a 0% rating on Rotten Tomatoes
