= Cedar Cove (TV series) =

American-Canadian drama television series

- Genre: Drama; Romance
- Based on: Cedar Cove by Debbie Macomber
- Developed by: Bruce Graham
- Starring: Andie MacDowell; Dylan Neal; Teryl Rothery; Sarah Smyth; Brennan Elliott; Corey Sevier; Bruce Boxleitner; Barbara Niven
- Composer: Mario Vaira
- Countries of origin: Canada; United States
- Original language: English
- No. of seasons: 3
- No. of episodes: 36 (list of episodes)

Production
- Executive producers: Ron French; Carl Binder; Caroline Moore; Dan Wigutow; Stephen Harmaty; Sue Tenney; Debbie Macomber; Andie MacDowell; Harvey Kahn; Michael M. Scott
- Producers: Harvey Kahn; Connie Dolphin; Lisa Towers
- Production locations: Vancouver, British Columbia, Canada
- Running time: 76 minutes (pilot); 42 minutes
- Production company: Unity Pictures Group

Original release
- Network: Hallmark Channel
- Release: July 20, 2013 – September 26, 2015

Cedar Cove is a drama television series on the Hallmark Channel that aired from July 20, 2013 to September 26, 2015. Based on author Debbie Macomber's book series of the same name, Cedar Cove focused on Municipal Court Judge Olivia Lockhart's professional and personal life and the townsfolk surrounding her. It was the network's first original scripted series, and lasted three seasons.

== Plot ==
Cedar Cove is a quaint, picturesque town on an island in the Puget Sound. Neighbors for the most part try to help each other, and people do not lock their doors in their trust in the community. The moral center and compass of the town is Olivia Lockhart, the bicycle-riding, scarf-wearing municipal court judge who grew up in the town. Regardless of her being the focus for many in town, Olivia's life has not been issue-free, she long ago had gone through a divorce from her physician husband; the dissolution of their marriage largely was due to the accidental drowning death of their son, Jordan, when he was 13, an incident from which they as a couple could not recover. Also affected was Jordan's twin sister, Justine, now a young woman, who has been struggling to find her place in life ever since. Much like the town is being pulled in different directions, such as by cutthroat developer Warren Saget, Olivia is often pulled in different directions, personally and professionally, which one day may take her away from Cedar Cove. In the former category is her search for love. Through it all, she acts as supporter to her friends and family, including librarian Grace Sherman, her best friend since they were children.

== Cast and characters ==
=== Main cast ===
- Andie MacDowell as Olivia Lockhart, Cedar Cove Municipal Court judge
- Dylan Neal as Jack Griffith, editor of the local newspaper, the Cedar Cove Chronicle, an admitted recovering alcoholic, and Olivia's love interest
- Teryl Rothery as Grace Sherman, Olivia's librarian best friend
- Sarah Smyth as Justine Lockhart, Olivia's artistic daughter who is an insecure person, largely because of the death of her twin brother Jordan when they were 13, and the resulting dissolution of her parents' marriage
- Brennan Elliott as Warren Saget, a cutthroat Cedar Cove land developer
- Bruce Boxleitner and Barbara Niven as Bob and Peggy Beldon, a married couple and owners of the local bed and breakfast, 'Thyme and Tide',
- Timothy Webber as Moon, the aged hippie proprietor of Moon's, a café/knick-knack store
- Corey Sevier as Seth Gunderson, Justine's high-school boyfriend, who now a commercial fisherman, returns to town in hopes of renewing their relationship, portrayed by Greyston Holt in the pilot episode (seasons 1–2)
- Paula Shaw as Charlotte Jeffers, Olivia's headstrong mother (season 1)
- Delilah (voiceover only), a nationally syndicated radio host, she provides quotes and inspirational passages as the host of her radio show in-universe in a fictional sense. These set up some of the plot devices, which occur throughout each episode. (season 1)
- Elyse Levesque as Maryellen Sherman, Grace's daughter (seasons 1 and 3, recurring season 2)
- Sebastian Spence as Cliff Harting, a rancher, was estranged from his father, once famous country singer Tom Harting, at the time of Tom's death. (seasons 2–3, recurring season 1)
- Tom Stevens as Eric Griffith, Jack's irresponsible son, he blames much of that irresponsibility on the fact that he had no male role model growing up. (season 2, recurring seasons 1 and 3)
- Jesse Hutch as Luke Bailey, an ex-Navy SEAL suffering from PTSD (seasons 2–3)
- Emily Tennant as Cecilia Rendall, a high school friend of Justine's (season 2, recurring season 3), portrayed by Katharine Isabelle in the series' pilot
- Cameron Bancroft as Will Jeffers, Olivia's philandering brother (season 3, recurring seasons 1–2)
- Cindy Busby as Rebecca Jennings, the young, ambitious assistant district attorney (season 3, recurring season 2)
- Rebecca Marshall as Alex Baldwin, a ranch hand, ex-stockbroker, and recovering alcoholic (season 3, recurring season 2)
- Colin Ferguson as Paul Watson, the new district attorney (season 3)
- Tom Butler as Buck Saget, Warren's wealthy businessman father (season 3)

=== Recurring cast ===
- Charlie Carrick as John Bowman, an artist and chef, he served jail time for a crime committed by his brother, and ends up as Maryellen's love interest, portrayed by Giles Panton beginning in season three.
- Hayley Sales as Shelly, Eric's folk-singing girlfriend
- Mike Dopud as Roy Mcafee, a private investigator
- Jesse Moss as Ian Rendall, Cecilia's military husband
- Garry Chalk as Cedar Cove Sheriff Troy Davis (seasons 1–2)
- Matreya Fedor as Allison Weston, a high-school student who volunteers at the library (seasons 1–2)
- Andrew Airlie as Stan Lockhart, Olivia's ex-husband and Justine's father, he left the family following the death of their son Jordan. He is a Seattle-based physician, and is remarried. (season 1)
- Julia Benson as Jeri Drake, a journalist and one of Jack's ex-wives (seasons 2–3)
- Chris William Martin as Anthony, the district attorney (seasons two and three)
- Sarah-Jane Redmond as Corrie Mcafee, Roy's wife (season 3)
- Anna Van Hooft as Linnette Mcafee, Roy and Corrie's daughter, a physician assistant (season 3)
- Andrew Francis as Derek, Seth's fisherman friend (season 3)
- Tara Wilson as Gloria Ashton, the daughter Roy and Corrie gave up for adoption (season 3)
- Laura Mennell as Kelly, Warren's estranged wife (season 3)
- Bruce Dawson as David, the hands-on owner of the Seattle Chronicle (season 3)

== Production ==
=== Setting and filming ===
Although filmed in Vancouver, British Columbia, the setting for the series (both book and television) is based on Port Orchard, Washington, producer/writer Debbie Macomber's summer residence.

"Cedar Cove" is the community of Deep Cove in North Vancouver, BC. Macomber stated that she tried to get the series filmed in Washington. "We did get tax incentives [for filmmakers] back but the problem is we don't have the infrastructure Canada does," she said.

With the announcement of the July 19, 2014, premiere date for the second season, Hallmark also announced that Sue Tenney, executive producer and writer for 7th Heaven, would take over as series showrunner.

=== Book to television deviation ===
In the book series, Grace's husband is disturbed by his actions in the Vietnam War and commits suicide, but for the television series, Macomber revealed that the network considered that "too heavy" of a storyline. Instead, Grace arrives home from vacation to announce her husband is divorcing her.

== Reception ==
Cedar Cove was given "generally favorable" reviews at the Metacritic website, based on the aggregate score of 62 out of 100 from ten critics. The Wall Street Journal's Nancy DeWolf Smith called the series "relaxing," adding that it is "as burden-free as a day on the beach with an umbrella, a book, and a breeze." Mary McNamara of the Los Angeles Times commented, "Despite a certain built-in B&B preciousness, Cedar Cove evokes certain splendid shows of another time and place, including the late-great 'Family' and the longtime Irish hit 'Ballykissangel.'" The New York Times's Neil Genzlinger commented that the "able" cast "makes it stand out from the stream of interchangeable Hallmark movies that aim for the same tone and audience."

Ellen Gray of the Philadelphia Daily News commented on the difference between Hallmark's standard fare and Cedar Cove, "While [Hallmark] movies are often forced to rush headlong toward their happy endings, a series can take more time. And in [the] four subsequent episodes I've seen, the stories and characters get to breathe a bit." The New York Post's Linda Stasi stated, "It ain't brain surgery and nobody's going to win any Emmys, but that's not why fans watch Hallmark." David Hinckley of New York's Daily News stated, "From the early evidence...there's every indication a Hallmark series will be the same sort of television comfort food as a Hallmark movie."

The Pittsburgh Post-Gazette's Rob Owen called the series "comfortable, uncomplicated, unchallenging entertainment," adding, "which makes it ideal for Hallmark's brand. Fans of Hallmark's movies will enjoy it; viewers who want to be more engaged and absorbed by a program may be bored." Brian Lowry of Variety stated,"There's still a distinction to be drawn between 'light' and 'weightless,' which is roughly where this new show registers—in part because the Olivia-Jack relationship is the only aspect with any resonance."

Ratings for Cedar Cove made Hallmark the top cable channel for its time slot on Saturdays.

== Episodes ==
During the course of the series, 36 episodes of Cedar Cove aired over three seasons, concluding on September 26, 2015.

Season	Episodes	Originally released	
Season	Episodes	First released	Last released
1	13	July 20, 2013	October 12, 2013
2	12	July 19, 2014	October 4, 2014
3	11	July 18, 2015	September 26, 2015

== International broadcast ==
The show began airing in the United Kingdom on 5 USA from February 9, 2014. The second season aired in the UK from May through June 2015 in a series of feature-length episodes, each consisting of two standard episodes. The show began airing in Turkey on Dizimax Drama on 5 March 2014. The show began airing in Greece on NovaCinema 1, NovaCinemaHD on June 4, 2014. The show began airing in Germany on Sat.1 Emotions on March 18, 2014, and aired Tuesdays at 8 p.m. The free-TV premiere took place on January 6, 2015 on the German Disney Channel. The show began airing in Italy on Rai1 on July 1, 2015, and airs Wednesdays at 9 p.m. Series 2 was shown immediately afterwards, starting on 18 August 2015 airing on Tuesday and Wednesday nights in blocks of three episodes, finishing on 26 August 2015. In Brazil, it began to appear in the Brazilian cable channel Mais Globosat on January 23, 2018. The show is also televised on Superchannel Heart & Home in Canada.

== Home media ==
Cinedigm released the first season of Cedar Cove in a three-disc DVD set on July 15, 2014, . The second season was released in a three-disc DVD set on July 14, 2015, t. The third and final season was released on a three-disc DVD set on March 15, 2016.
