= All Saints Catholic College, North Kensington =

All Saints Catholic College

Location
- 75 St Charles Square; North Kensington, London, W10 6EL; United Kingdom; 51°31′12″N 0°12′54″W

Information
- Type: Voluntary aided school
- Motto: Orare, Laborare, Servire (Prayer, Work, Service)
- Religious affiliation: Catholic
- Established: 1958
- Local authority: Kensington & Chelsea
- Department for Education URN: 100503 Tables
- Ofsted: Reports
- Chair of Governors: A Sayers
- Headteacher: Andrew O'Neill
- Staff: 120~
- Gender: Co-educational
- Age: 11 to 16
- Enrolment: 900~
- Colour: Purple
- Website: www.allsaintscc.org.uk

All Saints Catholic College is a Catholic co-educational secondary school situated in the North Kensington area of London, United Kingdom.

It was formerly called Sion-Manning Catholic Girls' School until the change of name in September 2018 and subsequently became a co-educational school. It is part of a cluster of Catholic institutions located at St Charles Square which includes St Charles Catholic Primary School, St Charles Catholic Sixth Form College, St Pius X Church, various community centres and the Carmelite Monastery of the Most Holy Trinity.

The school educates boys and girls aged between 11 - 16, and has no sixth form.

In November 2022, the Headteacher, Andrew O'Neill was awarded the Headteacher of the Year in Pearson National Teaching Awards. As of 2024, All Saints is one of the most popular schools in London and the second most popular Catholic school in England.

== History ==
Cardinal Henry Edward Manning had the vision to expand Catholic education in London but distrusted the Jesuits, who had already successfully established schools in Northern England. He acquired a plot of land in North Kensington for St Charles College for Boys, a boarding which had been founded by the Oblates of St Charles Borromeo in 1863, and it relocated there in 1874. The college was intended to prepare young men for the priesthood. The short-lived Kensington University College, also founded by Manning, was merged into the school as its "higher department". It closed in 1905 after 42 years in operation. Inspired by Charles Borromeo, Manning named the local parish St Charles, which covers present-day St Charles Square. The old buildings were taken over by the Sisters of the Sacred Heart who opened St Charles Teacher Training College and St Charles Demonstration School.

The training college was evacuated to Dorchester following the outbreak of World War II. The college buildings had been so badly damaged during the Blitz that the Sisters decided to move on to Roehampton where they were already running Digby Stuart College. The Archdiocese of Westminster took over the buildings in 1946 for redevelopment. St Charles Primary opened in 1954, followed by secondary moderns Cardinal Manning Boys School in 1955 and Cardinal Manning Girls School in 1958.

During the 1960s, Cardinal Manning Girls merged with a convent school founded by the Sisters of Sion at Chepstow Villas, Bayswater to form the present-day Sion-Manning School. Following a reorganisation of the Catholic education system within the archdiocese in 1990, Cardinal Manning Boys became St Charles Catholic Sixth Form College but remained on its site.

In September 2018, the school open as All Saints Catholic College with a new year 7 group of 150 students.

In July 2025, the Headteacher, Andrew O'Neill, was invited to be the advisor to the Department of Education for one year, and therefore, Paul Walton became the Headteacher.

== Notable former pupils ==
- Nuala Quinn-Barton (b. 1952) - former fashion model, Film Producer
- Hayley Atwell (b. 1982) - actress
- Shanika Warren-Markland - actress
- Khadija Saye (1992–2017) - photographer
