= List of Reaper characters =

The following is a list of characters in The CW television series Reaper.

== Main characters ==
=== Sam Oliver ===
The protagonist of the show, Sam Oliver (played by Bret Harrison) is a college dropout and all-around slacker who, thanks to a deal made by his parents in order to save his father's life, becomes a bounty hunter for the Devil when he turns 21. He dates his manager Andi.

Upon learning of his infernal debt, Sam initially thought that he was instantly doomed to be dragged down to Hell, only to be informed by the Devil that he is required to function as a bounty hunter for Hell - for the rest of his life. He now collects souls for the Devil using various vessels (which vary by episode), with the assistance of his best friends Sock and Ben. A quitter by nature, Sam's morality was immediately pressed when he realized that if he didn't go along with his part of the bargain, more and more people would be hurt because he failed to capture the escaped souls.

Sam is also given various powers to capture each soul, but these are often as much a hindrance as a help. In the season one finale, it is revealed that at least one of these abilities was retained from when Sam inadvertently used telekinesis trying to save a large heavy box from falling onto Andi's head on the pilot episode, by preventing a washing machine from falling onto himself in the last episode. In the second season he admits that he does not yet have full control over his "devil powers."

Near the end of season 1, Sam and Andi start a relationship briefly after she discovers Sam is the Devil's bounty hunter for hell.

At the end of season one, the demon Tony tells Sam that he believes Sam's parents were paid by the Devil to carry his (the Devil's) baby, though Sam's mother denied this, and the Devil admits that he would probably not answer Sam honestly if asked about it. Later, the Devil says that Sam is his son, while the father who raised Sam, Mr. Oliver, tells Sam that the deal with the Devil will not allow him to tell Sam the truth of the matter. All other characters who know about the claim assume that Sam, though kindhearted, is indeed the Devil's son.

During season 2, Sam discovers an escaped soul, Alan, that can't be sent back to hell because he claims he escaped the Devil. Sam continues throughout the season hunting down Alan, trying to get information on how to escape his contract.

In "Underbelly," the Devil hints that Sam is invulnerable. In "The Home Stretch," Sam inadvertently wins a competition with his half-brother Morgan and is appointed the Devil's right-hand man. In the words of the Devil, he is "my right-hand man, my human representative in this realm, serving at my side as we create hell on earth." In "No Reaper Left Behind", the Devil tells Sam, "I expect you to rise to the heights of political power here on earth, seize control of the planet, and hasten the Apocalypse."

Andi breaks up with Sam once Morgan revealed to her that Sam is the son of the Devil. She stated she recognized evil within him, and she can't deal with it. Even though she ended the relationship, Andi continues to assist Sam in capturing souls.

=== Bert "Sock" Wysocki ===
The lowest-performing salesperson at the Work Bench, Bert "Sock" Wysocki (played by Tyler Labine) spends most of his time sleeping in the stock shelves, planning his topless home supply store, and other time-wasting activities. He won the dog of the month award (the opposite of employee of the month) nine months in a row. He also regularly steals supplies from the Work Bench which aids Sam in capturing souls or he just uses them for fun (like making a mechanic bull from paint mixers and lumber). Fortunately, he is braver and more athletic than his slacker persona suggests, and often provides the muscle of Sam's group. Sock assists Sam with collecting souls.

Sock lived with his mother for the majority of the first season but had to move out after she remarried in Las Vegas. After being kicked out, he first lives in the Work Bench but then he finds an apartment and forges Sam's and Ben's signatures on the lease and they live there for the rest of the season.

At the start of the show Sock and Josie have just broken their relationship off but they get back together in the 14th episode and break off again in the final episode, with Josie saying that Sock is a bad boyfriend. In the last episode of the first season Sock kissed the succubus Marlena multiple times, losing one year from his life for each kiss (he estimates he has three years left).

In the beginning of the second season it is revealed that Sock has a beautiful Asian stepsister whom he finds sexually appealing and considers asking out. He continues down this path, even with his new sister continually viewing him as a big brother, and eventually convinces her that there is nothing wrong with them sleeping together which they do in the second-season episode "Underbelly." She leaves for Japan shortly after.

Sock is also one of four characters other than Sam who have captured a soul (the others being Andi, Ben, and Morgan). He captured the blob soul in episode five ("What About Blob") with the sweater vessel, and in the season finale ("Cancun"), he caught the fortune teller soul by throwing the baseball vessel through her car window after the fortune teller tried to run over both Sam and himself. In the first episode of season 2 ("Episode IV: A New Hope"), he captured one of the 40 fight club souls with the cattle prod vessel.

=== Benjamin "Ben" Gonzalez ===
One of Sam and Sock's co-workers and friends, Benjamin Casper Perez Gonzalez (played by Rick Gonzalez) knows Sam is working for Satan and helps him out. He seems to have a tendency to get hurt when assisting Sam in capturing escaped souls (though this tendency diminished as the series progressed, partially because he doesn't go soul-hunting along with Sam as extensively as Sock does). In the series pilot he is sent to the hospital by the fire soul and consumed by the blob monster in episode 5 ("What about Blob"), was held hostage in episode 10, ("Cash Out"), and hit by a 2×4 along with his friends while fighting two of the 40 fight club souls (Episode IV "A New Hope"). However, in "Dirty Sexy Mongol" Ben shows a rare side of bravery fending off a demon with a tiki torch, thereby saving Sam from the would-be assassin. Ben is initially seen as the brains of the trio as he is usually the one responsible for coming up with tactics and strategies in aiding Sam capture escaped souls, and is not above recommending and taking advantage of the Work Bench's merchandise as makeshift hunting gear whenever the three conduct a hunt; he initially sought training as a priest and has an extensive knowledge of the Bible, and often raises theological questions about the nature of their missions and the Devil's involvement.

Ben appears far less competent when he agrees to a green card marriage with his British co-worker Sara. He had just given up on his search for the perfect girl, who happens to be independently wealthy, enjoys mixed martial arts, and reads Sue Grafton novels. Once married, Ben immediately meets Cassidy while chasing a soul, and she fits every criterion for his perfect girl. Sara, far crueler and more shrewd than she initially lets on, forbids Ben to see Cassidy, though she has no qualms about her own extramarital affairs that she keeps secret from Ben. Ben is eventually able to negotiate a compromise with Sara after discovering she is pregnant with her married boyfriend Esteban's child.

When Ben's sham marriage is discovered by an INS agent, he is told he is going to jail. He gets money together to pay a fine in lieu of jail time, but Sara tricks him into giving her the money so that she can go on the lam. At the end of the episode "The Leak", Cassidy drives Ben to jail, telling Sock "When this is all over, my boyfriend will no longer be married." Early in the next episode, "Cancun," Ben arrives at the Work Bench disappointed that his friends forgot to pick him up after serving his eight-day sentence.

Ben is one of four people who have captured a soul for Sam (the others are Morgan, Sock and Andi) – he captured the tentacle soul in episode 24 ("Underbelly") with Sam's grenade vessel.

In season two, he begins dating Nina, a demon. In "The Home Stretch", he breaks up with her at the insistence of his domineering grandmother, but gets back together with her in "No Reaper Left Behind".

=== Andi Prendergast ===
Andi Prendergast (played by Missy Peregrym in the series and Nikki Reed in the unaired pilot) is Sam's manager and girlfriend. Initially unaware of Sam's Reaper duties, she is let down multiple times when Sam is called away from dates to capture souls. Chancing to see him on duty, Andi watches Sam behead an escaped soul from a distance, and initially threatens to go to the police. Sam is warned by the Devil to ensure she remains unaware of his activities, but eventually he receives permission to let her know what he does. With help from Sam's neighbor (and demon) Tony, as well as from the escaped soul at the time, Sam convinces Andi of his "job". Andi reacts poorly, but eventually accepts Sam's fate and becomes his third assistant in hunting souls, though her assistance seems more focused on research rather than actual confrontation.

Sam and Andi start dating near the end of season one but ends abruptly in "Underbelly" because Andi discovers from Morgan that Sam is the son of the devil. She can't handle this and believes that evil is brewing within Sam. Although they broke up, Andi continues to help Sam on his quest to get out of his deal with the Devil.

Andi is one of four people who have captured a soul for Sam (the others are Ben, Morgan, and Sock) - she captured the multiplying soul in episode 15 ("Coming to Grips") with Sam's scythe vessel.

=== John Oliver ===
Mr. John Oliver (played by Andrew Airlie) is possibly Sam's father. Though equally distressed by his son's predicament as his wife, he, in effect, works against Sam for the protection of his family. In one episode, Mr. Oliver is seen burning a page from the contract which binds Sam to the devil, to hide information from Sam (which he later admits to in the season finale). It is implied that not only may he not be Sam's father, but that he possesses some degree of supernatural power; it is not known whether or not it had something to do with the "cure" the Devil provided him more than 21 years ago prior to the deal he made involving the then-unborn Sam at that time (as to the fact that he survived being buried alive).

In the season two premiere ("Episode IV: A New Hope"), Sam is confident that the Devil is his true father, not Mr. Oliver. After surviving being buried alive at the end of Season 1, Mr. Oliver reappears as a zombie. Sam sees him again in "The Favorite" when delivering a fridge to his mother's house. Mr. Oliver explains that he cannot die because of the deal with the Devil that cost Sam his soul. As a zombie, he cannot go out in public and needs to be kept cool. His deceased status gives him plenty of free time, which he attempts to spend rekindling his relationship with Sam. At the end of "I Want My Baby Back," Mr. Oliver moves into the garage of Sock's parents' house and sleeps in a fridge.

In "No Reaper Left Behind," Mr. Oliver attempts to regain some semblance of a normal life through the use of the internet, only to be disappointed. In an effort to find some purpose, he asks Sam to send him to Hell in an attempt to locate Alan Townsend and help Sam get out of his deal. Sam agrees and captures him with the Nerf gun vessel.

=== The Devil ===
Smooth-talking and debonair, known as "Jerry Belvedere" to those who have no idea of his true identity, the Devil (played by Ray Wise) claims the rights to Sam's soul thanks to a deal he made with Sam's parents before Sam was even born. Although he knows how it all ends ("God wins"), he is determined to do as much as he can to oppose God until the end. He also convinces Sam that he (Sam) is doing good by clearing the world of the escaped evil souls. Aside from Sam and Morgan, the Devil never appears before any of Sam's friends face-to-face despite the Devil knowing about them and aware that they know Sam's secret job of being a reaper for him.

While firm at times, the Devil has never expressed outright anger, in spite of Sam's frequent complaints, incompetence, and meddling; however, when Sam cheated him out of a deal with another human, he caused all of the surrounding racks in the Work Bench to collapse on Sam out of "disappointment."

The Devil has nearly omnipotent supernatural powers, and often teleports an unsuspecting Sam to locations that serve to exemplify whatever subject he wishes to speak with Sam about. He also has a habit of providing Sam "motivation" in catching escaped souls, usually by informing him that someone just died (or is about to die) due mainly to Sam's inaction - a habit which generally gets acceptable results; this habit became less displayed in later episodes however, as Sam is beginning to "adjust" to his infernal fate.

The Devil is nearly indestructible, and scoffs at the idea that he could be contained within a Solomon's cage (which can confine the strongest demon). He also has superhuman strength, having tricked and placed Sam once in a painful arm-hold to interrogate him. However, the Devil can be affected by angelic relics, as he can be killed by the Sword of the Archangel Michael (which he has in safekeeping), and could be "destroyed" if whole world were to turn to pacifism (as Sam deduced after the Devil's near-annihilation of a demon rebellion, as if the Devil couldn't tempt others with sin, he would cease to exist - although the Devil notes that all humanity adopting complete pacifism would be nearly impossible). In addition, the Devil cannot see, hear, or appear within curves or circles, although he can be summoned within a circle. He holds no influence over true love, which may be attributed to his belief that humans are incapable of experiencing it. The Devil also confesses that even though he tried to overthrow God, he still loved Him when Sam asked the Devil about love. He confesses to Sam that God loves us all no matter what we are.

The Devil loves ice cream, but cannot eat it, as it melts as soon as he touches it. This doesn't happen on his own volition, but was apparently a curse given upon him by God shortly before he was cast out of Heaven, knowing how much he loves ice cream. It is later revealed that the devil opposes anthropogenic global warming as anyone who dies of it would be considered an innocent and not be sent to hell.

The Devil is apparently Sam's father, according to the Devil throughout the second season. He does many things throughout the series that imply this: He never gets truly angry with Sam, he only gets outwardly angry with him one time where he says that he is "a disappointment." He often offers guidance to Sam. He seems to have an extreme dislike of Sam's father. Throughout the series he and Sam do things that could be considered 'father-son activities' such as going to hockey games, eating ice cream, and playing baseball together.

In "The Home Stretch" the Devil held a competition between Sam and his half-brother Morgan. Whoever captured a soul would be made his right-hand man. Sam wanted Morgan to win because his incompetence would thwart the Devil; he inadvertently won, however, while saving Morgan's life from the escaped soul.

== Supporting characters ==
- Ted Gallagher (played by Donavon Stinson) - Ted was the Work Bench's pompous, imperious manager (and recovering gambling addict) who gave his employees, especially Sam, Andi, Ben, and Sock, a hard time. In episode 20 ("Dirty Sexy Mongol") Ted was fired from his job as manager at the Work Bench after sexually harassing a secret shopper sent from corporate. Corporate appointed Andi as the new store manager. She took pity on Ted and rehired him as a trainee for the Work Bench with Sock as his trainer.
- Gladys (played by Christine Willes) - A demon who works at a DMV office, which actually houses a portal to Hell. Gladys collects the filled vessels from Sam and sends them back to Hell. In "The Leak," when it was revealed that Gladys was the one repeatedly freeing home-wrecking soul Mike Volta from his vessel, the Devil "transferred" her to the "main office." She was later released at Sam's request.
- Josie Miller (played by Valarie Rae Miller) - Josie is Sock's ex-girlfriend who works at the district attorney's office. Despite her obvious dislike for Sock, Josie remains friendly with Sam and agrees to provide information that helps him track down different souls, unaware of his work for the Devil. However, after Sock used a share of stolen bank loot to buy duplicates of all the stuff lost in a fire at her apartment (which he inadvertently caused), she begins to suspect that something isn't quite on the "up-and-up" with the boys, and is even more suspicious and upset when her lost I.D. is used to access the city morgue. Toward the end of season one, Josie got back together (and subsequently broke up again) with Sock, due to his insecurity and his apathetic nature, respectively. Josie Miller only appeared in season one.
- Nina (played by Jenny Wade) - A demon who tried to kill Sam, but her assassination attempt was thwarted by Ben. Enamored by his loyalty to his friend and love for his pet bunny, Nina kidnaps Ben and takes him to her lair. In "The Sweet Science", Nina is introduced to the group as Ben's girlfriend, but Ben remains concerned that Nina is not really interested in him and still trying to kill Sam. Nina reveals to Ben that she once had a physical relationship with a fellow demon named Brad in "The Favorite". When Ben tries to break up with Nina in a restaurant, she cries tears of acid. She tells how, while she was still an angel, she once fell in love with a human. After her relationship with the human was discovered by God, her human lover died shortly thereafter, explaining her reluctance to get more involved with Ben. In "The Home Stretch", Ben shows his reluctance to introduce Nina to his grandma who has 'the eye'. Nina strikes up a pleasant conversation with her about St. Peter but is shocked into her demon form, which sends Ben's grandma into cardiac arrest. Ben later breaks up with Nina at the Work Bench, and Nina declares a vendetta. However, at the end of "No Reaper left Behind" they get back together.
- Tony (played by Ken Marino) - Sam's former neighbor, a demon and Steve's "widower". Tony was a leader of the anti-Devil rebellion, and was often plotting against the Devil. He helps Sam and his friends in their quest to capture escaped souls. As of the first-season finale, his whereabouts are unknown. It is Tony who tells Sam that he is the son of the Devil. In the Second Season, he reappears and adopts the newborn daughter of an escaped soul, who he names 'Stevie' after his deceased husband Steve.
- Mrs. Oliver (played by Allison Hossack) - Sam's guilt-ridden mother. Initially led to believe that Sam refused to do the Devil's work, she now accepts her son's fate, and actively supports him in his everyday life. According to the Devil, her soul is on the line if Sam should decide to quit his "job" as a Reaper. At the end of episode 18 ("Cancun"), she is seen digging up the very much alive Mr. Oliver, despite the fact that, when confronted by Sam about Mr. Oliver's burial, she claimed to be unaware of both the burial site and the fact that Mr. Oliver was still alive.
- Kristen (played by Eriko Tamura) - Sock's new stepsister who adores Sock for being the older brother she's always wanted and wants to be involved in 'brother/sister' activities with him. These put no end to Sock's frustrations as he's extremely attracted to her and wishes to sleep with her. He eventually convinces her that they should sleep together and as this new incestuous relationships began to develop, their parents return home. She leaves to return to Japan in "The Good Soil" to continue her education at hotel school.
- Morgan (played by Armie Hammer) - He is the son of The Devil and presumably Sam's paternal half brother. He first appears in "The Favorite", where Sam unwittingly bails him out of jail with his lottery winnings. He was arrested for stealing a limousine. He drives a silver Maserati, which was a gift from his ex, and tells Sam that he has no qualms in fighting Sam to the death for The Devil's righthand seat. Since The Devil feels that Morgan is unmotivated, he orders Sam to take Morgan on a reap in the hopes that Sam's good work ethics rub off. While Morgan is and always has been the Devil's favourite of the 2 sons so far introduced (Sam and Morgan) he is growing increasingly unsure of the situation, because while Morgan behaves as the Devil would like, he has little to no desire to work. By contrast Sam, though he regularly complains and defies the Devil, always "gets the job done." In "The Good Soil," he attempts to bribe Sam with money into capturing a soul and giving him the credit. He takes back his money after Sam turns in the dodgeball vessel with a corpse and later in the episode captures the soul with the vessel. In "The Home Stretch", The Devil challenges Sam and Morgan to a contest, in which whoever returned the soul back to Hell would become his right-hand man. When Sam accidentally wins the contest, The Devil takes everything from Morgan, and he swears revenge against Sam.
- Alan Townsend (played by Sean Patrick Thomas) - The man who reneged on his deal with the Devil. Sam meets Alan first in the Season 2 premiere, "A New Hope," during a reap to capture 40 fighting souls in a warehouse. After being knocked unconscious from Alan, Sam continues his hunt for him in "Dirty Sexy Mongol" and tracks him down to an apartment. He tries to solicit Alan's help, but two demons, sent by The Devil, attack Sam at the gate. Scared that he'll return to Hell, Alan leaves his apartment. Sam and Andi find out that Alan's been trying to stay off The Devil's radar by avoiding all temptation. Alan accepts a job offer as a gravedigger and takes refuge at a cemetery after being informed that the grounds have been consecrated and thus untouchable by the Devil and other demons. Sam and the others corner him at the cemetery and, since Alan was a gambling addict, attempt to bribe him with horse-racing tickets for the information. Alan eventually buys into a trip to Vatican City and tells Sam that he needs to challenge and beat The Devil (Alan beat The Devil in a game of poker). He promises to tell Sam how to make The Devil agree to the challenge after landing. As he is on a plane toward Vatican City, the Devil sends the plane to Las Vegas and gave him 100 dollars in casino chips, Later the Devil tells Sam that he took Alan back to hell after he started gambling (which is a sin, and Alan's deal with the devil was that if he sinned again he would return to hell).
- Steve (played by Michael Ian Black) - A deceased former neighbor of Sam, also a demon, and Tony's "ex"-husband. Prior to his death, Steve was an active part of the rebellion against the Devil. He chose the more passive path of rebellion over Tony's aggressive route, but still stood by him regardless. It is revealed in the first-season finale that Steve is still "alive", and is now an angel (again).
- Cady Hansen (played by Jessica Stroup) - Sam's ex-girlfriend, and possible daughter of the Devil. Cady is the daughter of Mimi, the Devil's ex-girlfriend, but her true father is unknown. Although Sam is initially attracted to her, he suspects that she may be the Devil's daughter (a suspicion seemingly put to rest by Sock and Ben in "Cash Out"). Despite his general calm to the situation, Sam's suspicions re-surface later on, due to her reportedly strange behavior around Andi and the manifestation of strange phenomena around her, such as breaking glass spurred by a kiss, and flowers wilting and dying several moments after she has touched them. At the end of "Unseen", Cady, upset by the fact that Sam still has been distant and in her eyes deceitful, goes to New Mexico to stay with her mother and sort things out. If the Devil truly was her biological father as well as Sam's, that would technically make them paternal half-siblings.

== Minor characters ==
- Kyle Oliver (played by Kyle Switzer) - Sam's younger brother. Much pressure has been put on him by his parents to be successful in life, which he considers unfair compared to them letting Sam slide. Kyle is the one member of the family unaware of Sam's debt to the Devil, and does not realize how lucky he was to be born second. He has only appeared in the pilot episode and "Charged" to date. Because of the Second season's premier, Kyle is now technically Sam's maternal half-brother.
- Judy Wysocki (played by Marilyn Norry) - Sock's mom. She went unseen until "Hungry for Fame," when she returned from Las Vegas and announced she had married an Asian cowboy named Morris. Angry that his mother had married without his blessing, Sock ran away from home; when he finally returned, his mother kicked him out of the house, prompting him, Sam, and Ben to move in together.
- Greg (played by Colby Johannson) - Andi's college boyfriend. He initially comes across as caring and sympathetic toward her needs, but it becomes clear that he knows very little about her and is more concerned about himself and his feelings. Greg and Sam end up fighting in "The Cop", and Andi breaks up with him. Broken-hearted, Greg sold his soul to the Devil, and returned (in "Greg, Shmeg") with a newfound influence over Andi. Unfortunately, as a result of his deal with the Devil, his id began physically manifesting itself as a chainsaw-wielding maniac that materializes from his body every time he got angry. Greg eventually realized that no matter what deal he made, Andi would never love him, as the Devil cannot influence true love. Sam used his "Get Out of Hell Free" card to undo Greg's deal.
- Sara (played by Lucy Davis) - Ben's ex-wife, a British national formerly employed at the Work Bench. In "Coming to Grips," after Ben gives up on finding his perfect girl, he agrees to a green card wedding with Sara in exchange for $1600. Ben eventually meets his perfect girl, Cassidy, later on while chasing a soul, but Sara expects him to live up to their deal and refuses to let him go out with Cassidy. When Ben threatens to report her to immigration, Sara counters by threatening to report him for extorting money from her. Ben considers just giving her the money back, until he discovers that Sock spent it on tickets to the Blue Collar Comedy Tour. In addition to being married to Ben, Sara is also involved with a married Cirque du Soleil performer named Esteban. When Sara reveals she's pregnant with Esteban's child, Ben has the bargaining chip he needs, and Sara eventually lets him date Cassidy. After an immigration officer discovers their ruse, Sara convinces Ben to give her $2000 to help bribe the officer; in actuality, she takes the money and goes on the lam.
- Cassidy (played by Kandyse McClure) - Ben's ex-girlfriend. She is a nurse at St. Vincent's Hospital who practices jiujitsu and enjoys Sue Grafton novels. Cassidy and Ben met in the maternity ward of St. Vincent's in "Coming to Grips" when Ben was pursuing prolific soul Jack King. After a string of dates in the hospital cafeteria, Cassidy began to ask questions, specifically about Ben's wedding ring; it was at that point that Ben came clean about his green card marriage to Sara. The three of them came to an understanding, although Cassidy would still get a little excited about being Ben's "mistress." When Immigration busted Ben and Sara, Cassidy was the one who took Ben to jail, excited at the prospect that he would be single again when he got out. In "The Sweet Science", Ben explains to Nina that Cassidy ditched him while he was still in jail.

== Sam's Powers ==
For every soul that Sam is forced to catch, the Devil gives him a special power to help him catch it, or give a hint for what he can do to stop it. These powers can range from psychic control, to growing tattoos that hint where the soul will be. It also seems that Sam can activate the powers any time, as seen in "The Underbelly," when through only anger, Sam can break the wine bottle without touching it. Not all of these powers affect his body. In "Love, Bullet, and Blacktop," all that happens is the song Radar Love by Golden Earring keeps playing.

== Demons ==
Demons, in the Reaper universe, are portrayed as seemingly neutral and non-aggressive (so far) entities who are either in the direct service of the Devil or plotting to overthrow his rule. It was stated that all demons were once angels who "fell" out of their place after joining up with the Devil's attempt to overthrow God and got banished along with him from Heaven.

Demons residing within the mortal realm exhibit the ability to assume near-human forms that enable them to live along with real humans, with the only thing distinguishing them from actual mortals (besides their immortality) being two small horns protruding from their foreheads which can be sanded down to create the complete illusion that they are human; they are also capable of morphing into their true demonic forms, as displayed by Tony, which seem to grant an incredible boost of physical power in the process, and flight to those with wings. They are immune to mortal weapons in either form. Types of Demons include standard demons and succubi.

== Reapers ==
'Reapers' are beings tasked by the Devil to apprehend souls that have escaped the depths of Hell. Sam became one in the premiere episode of the series. The word was first used in the episode "Acid Queen", which implies that there may be others like him with a similar obligation (or predicament). Currently, it is not exactly known how many Reapers there are, or if all of them are even human. Sam does not like this status but begins to live with this fate, though shows no surprise towards its utterance. It is made clear by the demon Steve that Sam is perhaps the only person on Earth that the Devil talks with face-to-face, which raises suspicion amongst Sam and his friends. This suggestion is later disproved when the Devil introduces Morgan, a young man the Devil claims is his son.

== Escaped souls ==
These are fugitives from Hell whom the Devil has entrusted Sam to recapture. All of them were once mortals who committed various crimes or sold their souls that ultimately led to their damnation. When they come back to Earth, they are intent on finishing the jobs that they started.

After escaping Hell and returning to the earthly realm, not only do they regain a corporeal body with which to interact with the living world once again, but they also exhibit supernatural powers that often reflect the nature of their crimes or punishments. For example, an arsonist imprisoned in Hell for 50 years being tortured by being burnt everyday came back with pyrokinetic powers and could take on the appearance of a humanoid creature made of molten rock. Leon Czolgosz, the assassin of William McKinley, gained the ability to turn his hands into guns. Not all souls come back to Earth with a corporeal body, as seen in "Ashes to Ashes," where the soul came back as a spirit since his body was destroyed.

== Vessels ==
As the souls that Sam is sent to apprehend have already died once (along with the fact that they have various paranormal abilities), an attempt to capture or even kill them by a mere mortal could prove almost impossible. The Devil provides Sam with vessels to help him do his work. The vessel is usually sent for Sam to open in a wooden box which varies in shape per episode, sometimes inappropriate for the vessel they hold (i.e. a large box contained a Zippo lighter vessel) and it's usually up to Sam to figure out how to use it to capture the escaped soul assigned for him to apprehend since the vessels don't usually come with an instruction manual. All vessels are unique because each of them is intended to capture the escaped soul for whom they were created and intended to confine. The vessel could even be a living thing (e.g. a live dove).

Vessels often have the appearance of seemingly ordinary day-to-day accessories, and can easily be mistaken for such. Most escaped souls shown in the series seem to be aware whenever a vessel is brought to their presence, especially if that particular vessel is the one intended for their capture, thus alerting them of potentially being sent back to Hell by the one wielding the vessel.

In "The Good Soil", it is revealed that vessels can capture other objects besides souls (e.g. a corpse).

== The Ender ==
Introduced in "The Good Soil", The Ender is The Devil's backup plan. When Sam refused to capture the soul and return it to Hell, The Ender was summoned to seek out and destroy the soul. As a result, the soul would neither be sent to Heaven or Hell. The Ender took on a form of a cloaked phantom and can destroy anything with one touch. It is unclear as to whether or not The Ender is real, or was simply an elaborate ruse set up by The Devil to trick Sam into believing the soul was safe so that Morgan could capture it.
