= Left in Darkness =

- Directed by: Steven R. Monroe
- Screenplay by: Philip Daay
- Produced by: Morris Berger; Stephen R. Brown; Stephen J. Cannell; Michael Dubelko
- Starring: Monica Keena; David Anders; Jessica Stroup; Travis Van Winkle
- Cinematography: Matthew Heckerling
- Edited by: Kristina Hamilton-Grobler
- Music by: Corey A. Jackson
- Distributed by: Anchor Bay Entertainment
- Release date: September 19, 2006
- Running time: 88 minutes
- Country: United States
- Language: English
- Budget: $1.2 million

Left in Darkness is a 2006 horror film produced by IDT Entertainment, and Soul Eaters Productions Inc. The film stars Monica Keena, David Anders, Jessica Stroup, and Travis Van Winkle.

== Plot ==
A young woman, whose mother died giving birth to her, is facing eternal life in either Heaven or Hell. She must make the choice whom to listen to, her guardian angel, whom she met when she was a child, or the evil ones.

== Cast ==
- Monica Keena
- David Anders
- Jessica Stroup
- Travis Van Winkle
- Tim Thomerson
- Tarah Paige
- Chelsea Cannell
- Shane Bitney Crone
- Jeridan Frye
- Marisa Lauren
- Justin Spraggins
