= Jessica Stroup =

American former actress (born 1986)

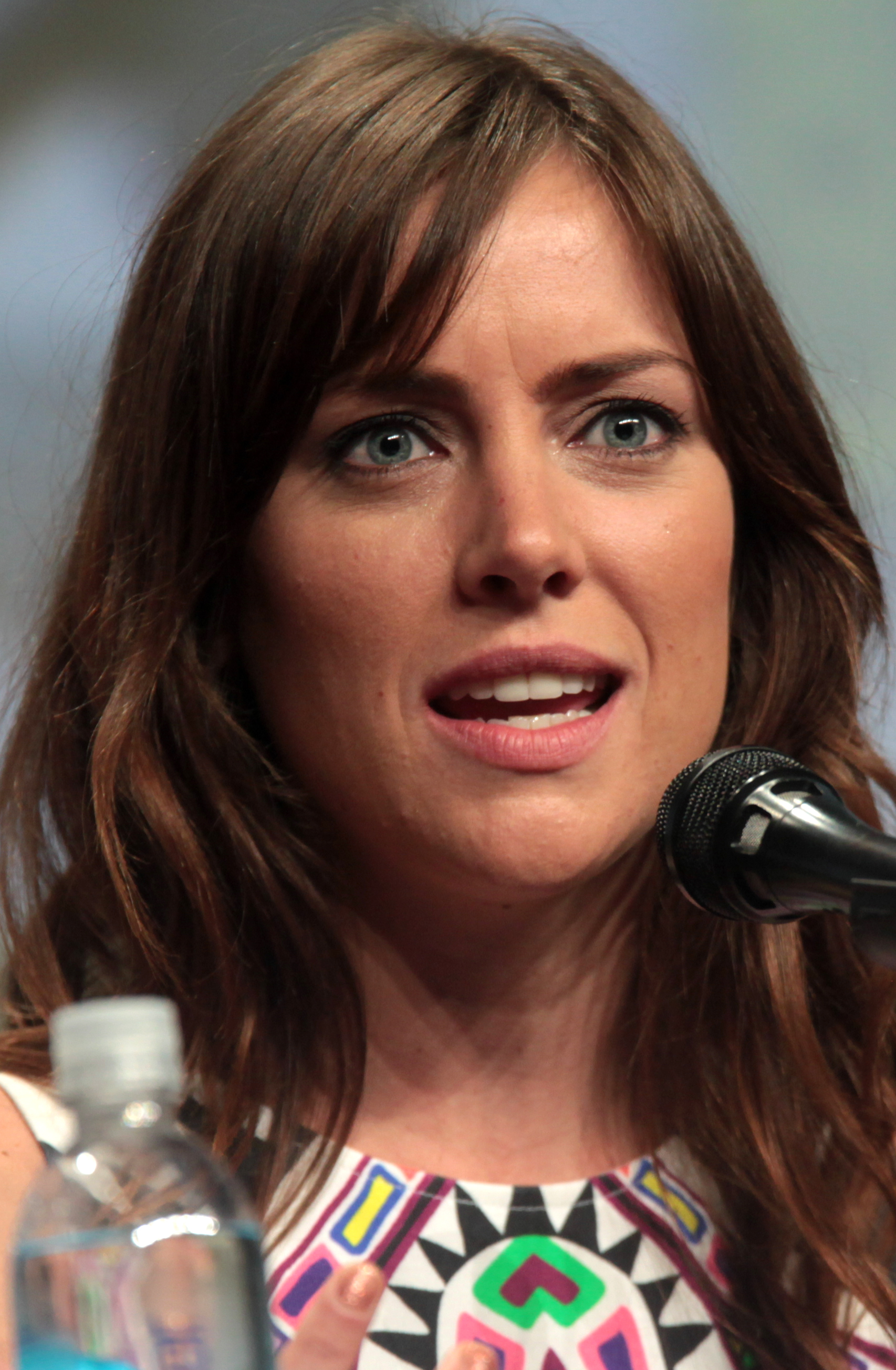
- Stroup in 2014
- Born: October 23, 1986 (age 39)
- Occupation: Actress
- Years active: 2005–2019
- Spouse: Neil Hutchinson (m. 2022)

Jessica Stroup (born October 23, 1986) is an American former actress, known for her roles as Silver on 90210 (2008–2013), Max Hardy on The Following (2014–2015) and Joy Meachum on Iron Fist (2017–2018), which is set in the Marvel Cinematic Universe (MCU). She is regarded as a scream queen for starring in the horror films Vampire Bats (2005), Left in Darkness (2006), The Hills Have Eyes 2 (2007), Prom Night (2008) and Homecoming (2009).

== Early life ==
Stroup was born to Judith and Don Stroup, a senior vice president at MUFG Union Bank. She spent her childhood in Charlotte, North Carolina. She graduated from Providence High School in 2004.

== Career ==
Stroup's first acting role was a guest appearance on a 2005 episode of Unfabulous. Stroup has since appeared in a number of other TV shows, such as Grey's Anatomy, October Road, and True Blood. In 2007, Stroup appeared in 4 episodes of Reaper, in which she played the protagonist's ex-girlfriend. She appeared in a number of small independent movie productions, such as Left in Darkness, Pray for Morning and Vampire Bats.

In March 2007, Stroup starred as the female lead in The Hills Have Eyes 2. Stroup played the role of a US Army National Guard soldier named Amber who fights for survival with her peers against a group of mutant people. The film was a fast-forward sequel to The Hills Have Eyes, a remake of the 1977 movie of the same name. Despite negative reviews from critics the film went on to gross over $67 million worldwide. That same year Stroup had a supporting role in This Christmas.

In April 2008, Stroup was cast as a series regular on 90210, a reboot of the Golden Globe Award-nominated series Beverly Hills, 90210. Stroup played the role of high school student Erin Silver, the younger sister of David Silver and Kelly Taylor from Beverly Hills, 90210. The pilot premiered on September 2, 2008, to a high 4.65 million viewers despite mixed reviews from critics. In 2010 Stroup was awarded the "Sparkling Performance" award at the Young Hollywood Awards.

Also in April 2008, Stroup played the role of Claire in the film remake Prom Night. In December 2007, MTV.com announced that Stroup was cast in another horror film titled Homecoming, which follows a young woman being kidnapped by her boyfriend's ex-girlfriend. Despite the film completing production in February 2008, it was not released until July 2009 for a limited release in selected cinemas. In 2008, Stroup played Rachel in the ensemble film The Informers.

In 2011, Stroup guest-appeared on Family Guy, in which she voiced a number of characters in two episodes. Stroup reunited with Seth MacFarlane in his directorial debut Ted, in which she played Tracy, a work friend of Lori (played by Mila Kunis).

On August 20, 2013, it was announced that Stroup would join The Following in season 2 as a series regular. Her character, Max, is "the niece of Ryan Hardy (Kevin Bacon). She’s an NYPD cop, currently working in the Intel Division. Max reconnects with Ryan and she becomes a valuable ally."

In March 2017, she joined the cast of Iron Fist as Joy Meachum.

She has retired as an actress in 2019.

== Personal life ==
Stroup lives in Los Angeles. She married businessman Neil Hutchinson in 2022.

== Filmography ==
=== Film ===
Year	Title	Role	Notes
2005	Vampire Bats	Eden	Television film
2006	Pray for Morning	Ashley	
2006	Left in Darkness	Justine	Direct-to-video
2006	School for Scoundrels	Eli's wife	
2006	Broken	Sara	
2007	The Hills Have Eyes 2	Amber "Barbie" Johnson	
2007	This Christmas	Sandi Whitfield	
2007	Structure H Telepathic	Allie	Short film
2008	Prom Night	Claire Davis	
2008	The Informers	Rachel	
2009	Homecoming	Elizabeth Mitchum	
2012	Ted	Tracy	
2016	Jack Reacher: Never Go Back	Lt. Sullivan	

=== Television ===
Year	Title	Role	Notes
2005	Unfabulous	Fredericka	Episode: "The Road Trip"
2006	Southern Comfort	Lindy	Unsold Fox pilot
2006	Girlfriends	Riley	Episode: "Oh, Hell Yes: The Seminar"
2006	Zoey 101	Girl	Episode: "Lola Likes Chase"
2007	Grey's Anatomy	Jillian "Jilly" Miller	Episode: "Great Expectations"
2007–2008	Reaper	Cady Hansen	4 episodes
2007	October Road	Taylor	Episode: "Once Around the Block"
2008–2013	90210	Erin Silver	Main cast; 114 episodes
2008	True Blood	Sorority girl Kelly	Episode: "Strange Love"
2011	Family Guy	Crowd member (voice); Denise (voice)	2 episodes
2014–2015	The Following	Max Hardy	Main cast; 28 episodes
2017	You're the Worst	Young Faye	2 episodes
2017–2018	Iron Fist	Joy Meachum	Main cast; 23 episodes
2019	Heart of Life	Alexandra Reid	TV movie (final role)
