= Nuala Quinn-Barton =

Irish American film producer

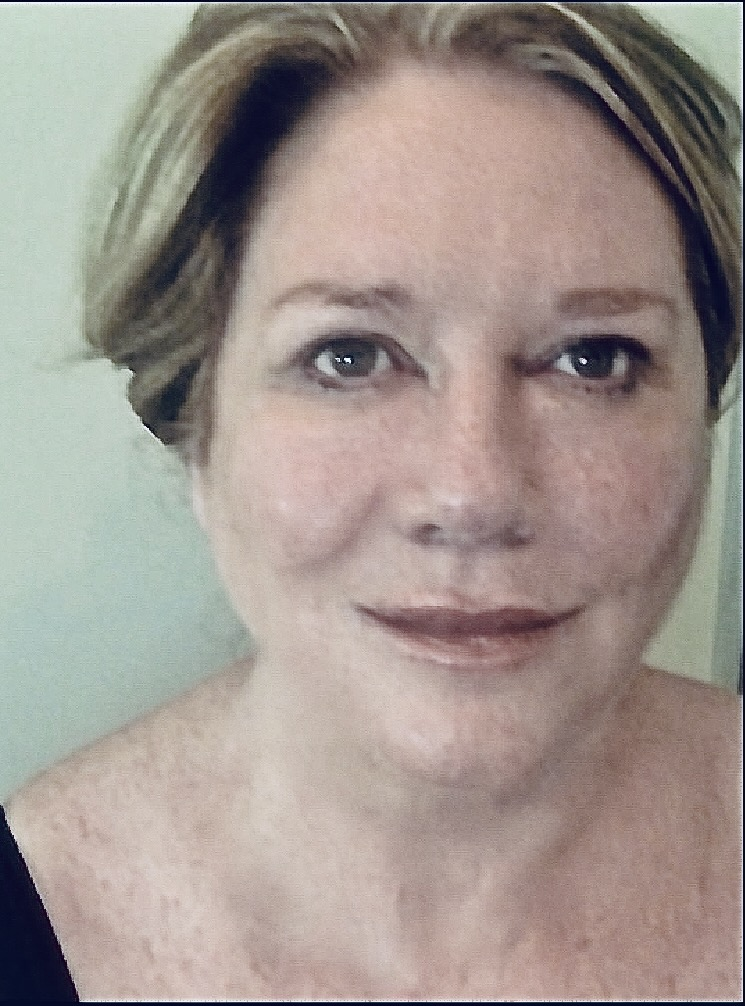
- Nuala Quinn-Barton
- Born: Nuala Quinn; March 1952 (age 74); Newry, Northern Ireland
- Occupations: Filmmaker; artist; talent manager
- Years active: 1968–present
- Spouse: Paul Marsden Barton
- Children: 3, including Mischa Barton

Nuala Quinn-Barton (born 20 March 1952) is an Irish American independent film producer, artist, talent manager and former fashion model from Newry, Northern Ireland. She is the CEO of Mania Entertainment LLC (est. 1990) and The Film Co-Operative LLC, an Official Member of the International Chamber of Arts (ICA), a distinguished global platform uniting leaders of the international arts economy, associated with the World Business Angels Investment Forum (WBAF) chaired by Baybars Altuntas of which she is an International Partner —an affiliated partner of the G20 Global Partnership for Financial Inclusion (GPFI). Through WBAF, she supports global economic development by expanding access to finance and innovative financial instruments for entrepreneurs, startups, scale-ups, SMEs, and investors. Her work bridges storytelling, capital, and technology to build globally scalable film and media ventures. On the film technology front she is involved in working with the latest techniques, pre-visualization and Ai technology to cut the cost of filmmaking. In October 2026 it was announced that CineLeap, the production-technology platform developed by The Film Co-Operative LLC, Nuala Quinn-Barton, would form a strategic partnership with SP Cinecorp Cinematic Venture Ltd. the Indian content and distribution group behind SP Rupam Studios. Cinecorp to serve as CineLeap's first-look partner for Indian-territory distribution of CineLeap produced Films.

She is best known for producing films such as Homecoming (2009), The Third Half (2012), Goodbye Christopher Robin (2017), and for managing the careers of her daughter, actress Mischa Barton, writer/ producer Daniel McNicoll, actress Kya Garwood, actress Kelly Lynn Reiter, producer Taheim Bryan, Director Cody Knotts, and best-selling writer Ted Lazaris. She is married to Paul Marsden Barton.

== Early life and career ==
Nuala Quinn was born in Newry and spent her early years on her mother's family farm in Ballintober, County Roscommon, Republic of Ireland. She graduated in English and European Studies at the University of East Anglia.

She went to London for her education at Our Lady of Sion School, Sion Manning School and Lucie Clayton Charm Academy. Nuala was a fashion model for Lucie Clayton and the Gavin Robinson Agency in the 1970s. During that period she worked in-house for several fashion companies including Chanel in Paris. She is known for Advertising Campaigns such as SuperWash Wool and Corocraft Sunglasses and Jewelry.

She married Paul Marsden Barton, a foreign exchange broker, in June 1975 at St Osmund's Roman Catholic Church in Barnes London. They have three daughters: Zoe Barton KC, a London barrister; Hania Barton, a writer and real estate manager; and Mischa Barton, an actress. She has two grandchildren from her eldest daughter Zoe's marriage to Ian Taylor.

The family moved from London to New York City in the early '90s and became naturalized American Citizens. They developed a 'raw space' in Tribeca's Reade St, converting it into an apartment and two store fronts, one of which a fashion store was rented out to Sorelle Firenze Nuala built relationships in the Arts with New York Theatre Workshop, the Public Theater The Circle in the Square, and the Lincoln Center Theater and she encouraged her daughter, actress Mischa Barton, through her passion for theatre. She also worked closely with the IMG Company in NYC.

She was Mischa's mentor and talent manager throughout her early career during her rise to fame, responsible for the casting of her daughter in productions including The O.C., a popular Television Series on the Fox Network, Lawn Dogs The Sixth Sense St Trinian's and the Notting Hill Film amongst others.

Her current films include A Natural Selection, Organism 46-B The Unseen, The Hollow Man:-Shadows Over Oz, and Spawn of the Living Dead a sequel to Night of the Living Dead by John A. Russo

== Filmography ==
Year	Title	Role	Notes
1997	Lawn Dogs	Creative Assistant	Completed
1999	Notting Hill	Personal Assistant	Completed
1999	The Sixth Sense	Personal Assistant	Completed
2002	A Ring of Endless Light	Creative Assistant	TV movie
2007	St Trinian's	Creative Assistant	Completed
2009	Homecoming	Creative Consultant/Executive Producer	Completed
2012	The Third Half	Financial Consultant/Executive Producer	Completed
2017	By Love Reclaimed: The Untold Story of Jean Harlow and Paul Bern	Development Executive/Producer	Completed
2017	Goodbye Christopher Robin	Development Consultant/Executive Producer	Completed
2020	The Naughty Boys	Development Executive/Producer	pre-production
2020	Marilyn Monroe Returns: A Doctors' Odyssey	Producer	pre-production
2020	Glastonbury Isle of Light: Journey of the Grail	Financial Consultant/Producer	pre-production
2018	For the Love of a Butterfly	Producer	production
2021	Cast Out	Producer	
2022	Detour 95	Executive Producer	Pre-production
2022	The Legend of Johhny Jones	Executive Producer	Announced
2023	DragonMan:The Adventures of Luke Starr	Development Executive/Financial Consultant/Producer	Pre-production
2023	Becoming Picasso	Producer	Announced
2024	A Natural Selection	Producer/Casting/Financial Consultant	pre-production
2024	Medium Rare Cold Case	Executive Producer	completed
2024	In the Cards	Producer	completed
2025	Spawn of the Living Dead	Producer/Casting/Financial Consultant	pre-production
2025	Organism 46-B The Unseen	Producer/Casting/Financial Consultant	pre-production
2026	The American Diplomat	Producer	announced
2026	The Hollow Man :- Shadows Over Oz	Producer	Production
