= Ballintober, County Roscommon =

Ballintober Baile an Tobair
- Village
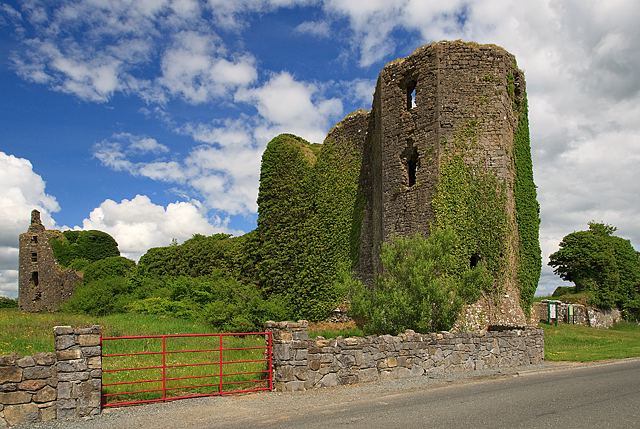
- Ballintober Castle

- Location in Ireland
- Coordinates: 53°43′04″N 8°24′35″W
- Country: Ireland
- Province: Connacht
- County: County Roscommon
- Elevation: 83 m (272 ft)

Population (2022)
  - Total: 199
- Time zone: UTC+0 (WET)
  - Summer (DST): UTC-1 (IST (WEST))
- Irish Grid Reference: M725741

Ballintober (Irish: Baile an Tobair, meaning 'settlement of the well') is a village in County Roscommon, Ireland. It is 6 kilometres (4 mi) from the town of Castlerea. As of the 2022 census, Ballintober had a population of 199. The village is in a townland and civil parish of the same name.

On the outskirts of the village are the remains of an early 14th century stone castle first mentioned in writing in 1311. It is not recorded who built Ballintober Castle, but it is generally associated with the O'Conor family who ruled Connaught for several centuries.

== See also ==
- List of towns and villages in Ireland

== People ==
- Nuala Quinn-Barton, Irish American independent film producer and talent manager
