= Katarina Ivanovska =

Macedonian model and actress

Katarina Ivanovska Катарина Ивановска
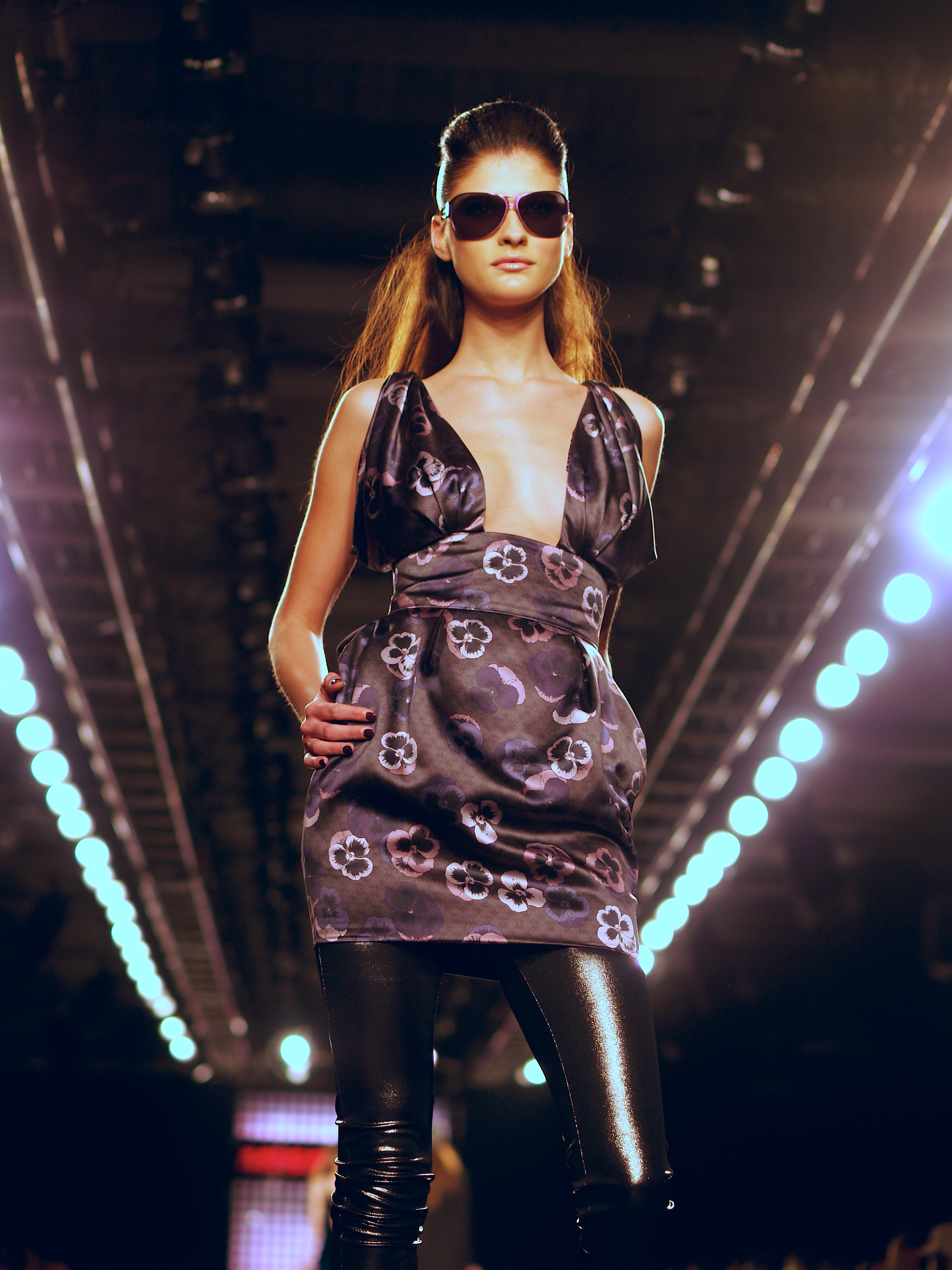
- Born: 18 August 1988 (age 37); Skopje, SR Macedonia, SFR Yugoslavia
- Children: 2
- Modeling information
- Height: 1.80 m (5 ft 11 in)
- Hair color: Brown
- Eye color: Green

Katarina Ivanovska (Macedonian: Катарина Ивановска; born 18 August 1988) is a Macedonian model and actress. She began her modeling career in 2004, appearing at Milan Fashion Week after winning the Look Models International model search in North Macedonia. In December, 2004, she appeared in a pictorial for Elle magazine and has also appeared in Citizen K, Stiletto and the Italian and Russian issues of Vogue. She has been featured on the covers of Diva and Máxima magazines and in advertisements for D&G in 2006. She is considered the most successful Macedonian model. In 2010, Ivanovska appeared in Serbian Elle magazine. In 2011 she signed a contract for advertising Victoria's Secret products. She played the lead in the 2012 Macedonian film The Third Half.
