= Debbie Macomber =

American writer (born 1948)

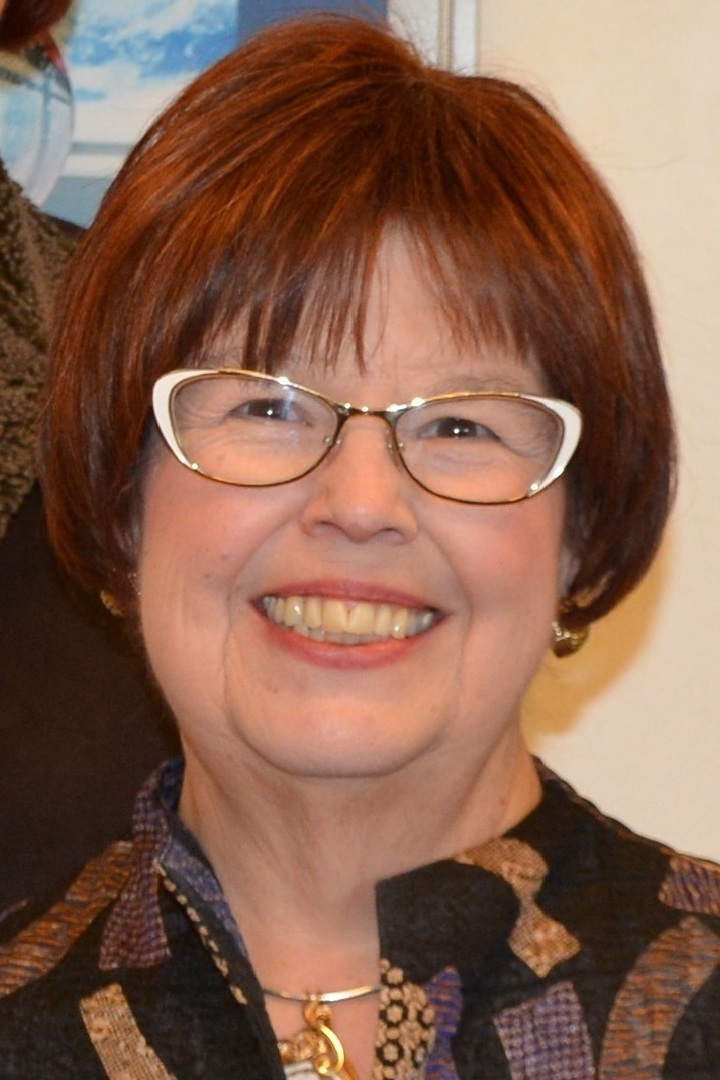
- Macomber at a 2016 book signing
- Born: October 22, 1948 (age 77); Yakima, Washington, U.S.
- Occupation: Author
- Writing career
- Period: 1983–present
- Genres: Romance; women's fiction
- Notable work: The Christmas Basket
- Notable awards: RITA award – Traditional Romance; 2003 The Christmas Basket
- Website: debbiemacomber.com

Signature
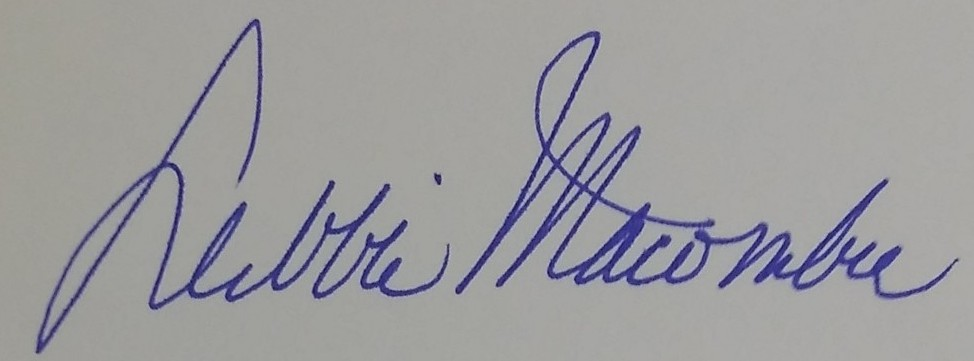

Debbie Macomber (born October 22, 1948) is an American author of romance novels and contemporary women's fiction. Six of her novels have become made-for-TV movies and her Cedar Cove series of novels was adapted into a television series of the same name. Macomber was the inaugural winner of the fan-voted Quill Award for romance in 2005 and has been awarded both a RITA Award and a lifetime achievement award by the Romance Writers of America.

She also works as executive producer on the television adaptations of her books.

== Career ==
=== Early career ===
Macomber is dyslexic and had a high school education. Determined to be a writer, she sat in her kitchen in front of a rented typewriter to develop her first few manuscripts, while raising four children. After five years and many rejections from publishers, she turned to freelance magazine work.

Macomber attended a romance writers' conference, where one of her manuscripts was selected to be publicly critiqued by an editor from Harlequin. The editor tore apart her novel and recommended that she throw it away. Undaunted, Macomber spent $10 to mail the same novel, Heartsong, to Harlequin's rival, Silhouette Books. Silhouette bought the book, which became the first romance novel to be reviewed by Publishers Weekly.

=== Career ===
Starlight was the first of her novels to be published, as part of the Silhouette Special Edition romance line. Macomber continued to write romances for Silhouette, and later Harlequin. In 1988, Harlequin asked Macomber to write a series of interconnected stories, which became known as the Navy series. Before long, she was releasing two or three titles per year. By 1994, Macomber began releasing single-title novels. Her first hardcover was released in 2001.

In 2002, Macomber realized that she wanted to write books focusing more on women and their friendships. Thursdays at Eight was her first departure from the traditional romance novel into contemporary women's fiction.

In most years since 1986, Macomber has released a Christmas-themed book or novella.

Macomber's novels focus on delivering the message of the story and do not include detailed descriptive passages. Her heroines tend to be optimists, and the "stories are resolved in a manner that leaves the reader with a feeling of hope and happy expectation." Many novels take place in small, rural towns, with her Cedar Cove series loosely based on her own hometown, Port Orchard, Washington. Because of her Christian beliefs, Macomber does not include explicit sexual details in her books, although they do contain sensuality.

Over 170 million copies of her books are in print throughout the world. This Matter of Marriage became a made-for-TV-movie in 1998. Six of Macomber's novels have been made into Hallmark television movies: Debbie Macomber's Mrs. Miracle, Call Me Mrs. Miracle, Trading Christmas (based on Macomber's novel When Christmas Comes), Mr. Miracle, Dashing Through the Snow, and A Mrs. Miracle Christmas.

Macomber also now writes inspirational nonfiction, including cookbooks and children's books. Macomber owns a yarn store in Port Orchard, Washington, and there is a Debbie Macomber line of knitting pattern books. The yarn store, A Good Yarn Shop, closed its doors on November 4, 2016. The shop was open for eight years prior to Macomber deciding to focus on other business ventures.

In July 2013, the Hallmark Channel began airing its first-ever original, scripted series based on her Cedar Cove book series. Macomber is the series developer and executive producer. The Cedar Cove television series ran for 3 seasons and ended in 2015. The show received 2 nominations for LEO awards, Best Costume Design in a Dramatic Series and Best Supporting Performance by a Male in a Dramatic Series (2014), and one nomination for a Prism award, Drama Episode - Mental Health (2015).

=== Awards and reception ===
- 2003 - Romance Writers of America RITA Award, Traditional Romance – The Christmas Basket

Macomber is also a three-time winner of the B. Dalton Award, and the inaugural winner of the fan-voted Quill Award for romance (2005, for 44 Cranberry Point). She has been awarded the Romantic Times Distinguished Lifetime Achievement Award.

She threw out the first pitch in a Seattle Mariners game at Safeco Field in 2007.

=== Personal ===
Macomber is a volunteer mentor for young people, and is active in fundraising for battered women's shelters and for literacy and medical research. She is a national board member for Warm-Up America, and was appointed an ambassador for the Big Brothers Big Sisters of America national office in 1997.

Macomber and her husband, Wayne, raised four children and have grandchildren. They live in Port Orchard, Washington.

== See also ==
- List of romantic novelists
