= Murder, She Baked =

2015 American/Canadian television series

- Also known as: Hannah Swensen Mysteries
- Genre: Mystery film
- Written by: Joanne Fluke; Nancey Silvers; Teena Booth; Kraig Wenman; Melissa Salmons; Marcy Holland; Alison Sweeney; Nick Hopkins; Tim James
- Directed by: Mark Jean; Kristoffer Tabori; Pat Williams; Shannon Kohli; Kevin Leslie; Yan-Kay Crystal Lowe; Peter Benson
- Starring: Alison Sweeney; Cameron Mathison; Victor Webster
- Countries of origin: United States; Canada
- Original language: English
- No. of episodes: 5; 9

Production
- Executive producer: Alison Sweeney

Original release
- Network: Hallmark Movies & Mysteries
- Release: May 2, 2015 – October 6, 2023
- Network: Hallmark Mystery
- Release: April 5, 2024 – February 6, 2025
- Network: Hallmark Channel
- Release: June 22, 2025 – May 16, 2026

Murder, She Baked is an American/Canadian television film series based on the cozy mystery novels written by Joanne Fluke. The television films are centered around small-town baker Hannah Swensen, portrayed by Alison Sweeney, and Detective Mike Kingston, played by Cameron Mathison. Five films for the Hallmark Movies & Mysteries channel were created based on Fluke's book series, with the fifth movie airing on March 26, 2017. The films took a four-year hiatus before returning as the Hannah Swensen Mysteries. The films are set in the fictional town of Eden Lake in Minnesota, reverting to Lake Eden like in the novels in the sixth film.

== Cast ==
- Alison Sweeney as Hannah Swensen, a local baker who owns the Cookie Jar bakery and cafe
- Cameron Mathison as Detective Mike Kingston, a recently widowed homicide detective who moves to town from the city
- Lisa Durupt as Andrea Swensen Todd, Hannah's sister
- Toby Levins as Deputy Bill Todd, a local detective who is married to Andrea
- Gabriel Hogan as Doctor Norman Rhodes, a dentist and Hannah's close friend
- Barbara Niven as Delores Swensen, Hannah, Andrea and Michelle's mother
- Juliana Wimbles as Lisa Herman, a helper at Hannah's bakery
- Garry Chalk as Mayor Bascomb, the town's Mayor
- Tess Atkins as Michelle Swensen, youngest daughter of Delores
- Victor Webster as Chad Norton, Lake Eden's prosecuting attorney

== Film series ==
No.	Title	Directed by	Written by	Original release date
1	"Murder, She Baked: A Chocolate Chip Cookie Mystery"	Mark Jean	Joanne Fluke (Chocolate Chip Cookie Murder); Donald Martin	May 2, 2015
Hannah Swensen's bakeshop, the Cookie Jar, is where much of the town's gossip percolates. But after she finds her good friend and delivery driver shot dead in the alley behind her shop, Hannah's idyllic world is turned upside down.
2	"Murder, She Baked: A Plum Pudding Mystery"	Kristoffer Tabori	Joanne Fluke (Plum Pudding Murder); Nancey Silvers	November 15, 2015
The owner of a Christmas tree lot, Larry Jaeger, is murdered. The list of suspects is a long one, from a bitter ex-wife to exasperated investors. Hannah takes an interest in the case as Detective Mike Kingston tries to keep her safe. Hannah is pushed further to make a choice between Norman and Mike while Andrea announces her pregnancy at the end of the episode.
3	"Murder, She Baked: A Peach Cobbler Mystery"	Kristoffer Tabori	Joanne Fluke (Peach Cobbler Murder); Teena Booth	January 10, 2016
Soon after a rival bakery opens, Mike's old friend and the owner, Melanie Quinn, is found dead at the bakery by Hannah. Meanwhile, Mike tries to help her as best he can trying to balance being a detective with Hannah as a suspect and his feelings for her.
4	"Murder, She Baked: A Deadly Recipe"	Kristoffer Tabori	Joanne Fluke (Fudge Cupcake Murder); Teena Booth & Kraig Wenman	June 19, 2016
Bakery owner Hannah Swensen just can't keep her hands out of the batter when a murder stirs things up in Lake Eden, Minnesota, leaving the sheriff dead, a deputy accused, and a killer on the loose.
5	"Murder, She Baked: Just Desserts"	Kristoffer Tabori	Joanne Fluke (Strawberry Shortcake Murder); Melissa Salmons	March 26, 2017
Hannah's first-ever televised bake-off competition turns deadly, when a judge, grumpy high school coach Leonard Bishop, is found dead of very unnatural causes. She and detective boyfriend Mike find indications that other judges might also be targeted, including Hannah.
1	"Sweet Revenge: A Hannah Swensen Mystery"	Pat Williams	Joanne Fluke (Cream Puff Murder); Marcy Holland	August 8, 2021
2	"Carrot Cake Murder: A Hannah Swensen Mystery"	Pat Williams	Joanne Fluke (Carrot Cake Murder); Melissa Salmons	May 19, 2023
3	"A Zest for Death: A Hannah Swensen Mystery"	Shannon Kohli	Joanne Fluke (Lemon Meringue Pie Murder); Marcy Holland	October 6, 2023
4	"One Bad Apple: A Hannah Swensen Mystery"	Shannon Kohli	Joanne Fluke (Apple Turnover Murder); Alison Sweeney	April 5, 2024
5	"A Sprinkle of Deceit: A Hannah Swensen Mystery"	Kevin Leslie	Joanne Fluke (Coconut Layer Cake Murder); Nick Hopkins & Tim James	October 4, 2024
6	"Reality Bites: A Hannah Swensen Mystery"	Kevin Leslie	Joanne Fluke (Blueberry Muffin Murder); Alison Sweeney	February 6, 2025
7	"Pie to Die For: A Hannah Swensen Mystery"	Yan-Kay Crystal Lowe	Joanne Fluke (Banana Cream Pie Murder); Alison Sweeney	June 22, 2025
8	"Sugar & Vice: A Hannah Swensen Mystery"	Peter Benson	Joanne Fluke (Sugar Cookie Murder); Alison Sweeney	March 7, 2026
9	"Best Served Cold: A Hannah Swensen Mystery"	Peter Benson	Joanne Fluke (Triple Chocolate Cheesecake Murder); Alison Sweeney	May 16, 2026
