= Alison Sweeney =

American actress (born 1976)

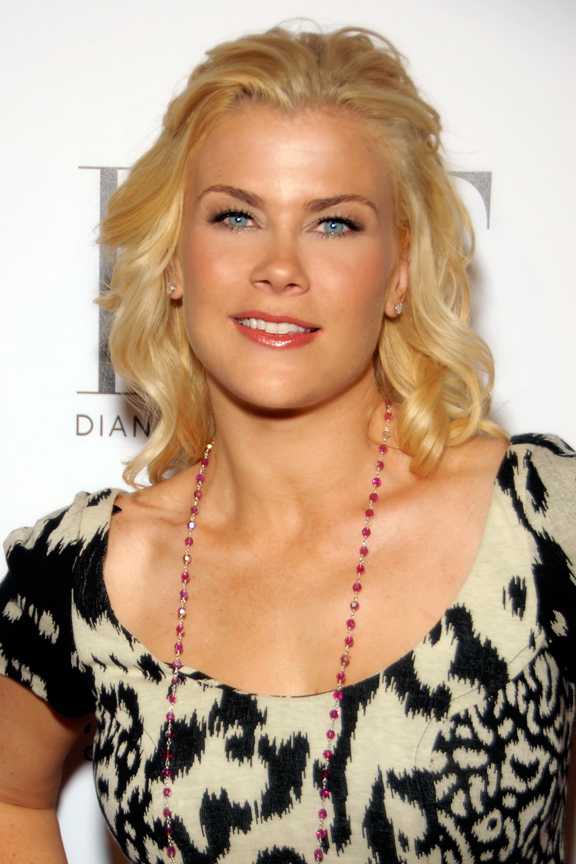
- Sweeney in 2009
- Born: Alison Ann Sweeney; September 19, 1976 (age 50); Los Angeles, California, U.S.
- Occupations: Actress; director; author; reality show host
- Years active: 1981–present
- Known for: Days of Our Lives; The Biggest Loser
- Spouse: David Sanov (m. 2000)
- Children: 2

Alison Ann Sweeney (born September 19, 1976) is an American actress, reality show host, director, producer, and author. Sweeney is best known for her portrayal of Samantha "Sami" Brady on the NBC soap opera Days of Our Lives, a role she played under contract with the show from January 6, 1993 to October 30, 2014. In this role, she earned a Daytime Emmy Award nomination, four Soap Opera Digest Awards and a Fan Voted Daytime Emmy Award. After making sporadic appearances since then, she returned as a series regular in 2021. In 2007, she became the host of The Biggest Loser in its fourth season, and left the series at the end of the 16th season in 2015.

== Personal life ==
Sweeney is of Irish descent and has two brothers. She studied economics at UCLA but left due to her commitment to Days of Our Lives. On July 8, 2000, Sweeney married David Sanov, after dating for nearly three years. The couple has two children: a son born on February 25, 2005, and a daughter born on January 12, 2009. The family once lived in Los Angeles, but moved to Arizona.

== Career ==
Sweeney's television debut was at age five in a Kodak advertisement. A few years later, she was in the episode "I Can't Help Saying Goodbye" of the horror series Tales from the Darkside, playing a young girl who could sense when others were going to die shortly before their deaths. In 1988, she appeared on the short-lived ABC sitcom Family Man, and the following year, was cast as Christy McCray on Brand New Life, a miniseries from future X-Files creator Chris Carter that aired within NBC's Magical World of Disney in October 1989. The miniseries, which co-starred Barbara Eden as Sweeney's mother and Don Murray as her new stepfather, was considered for pick-up as a stand-alone series beyond its Disney tryout, but the regular series never materialized.

On January 6, 1993, then 16-year-old Sweeney first appeared in the role of Samantha "Sami" Brady in the NBC soap opera Days of Our Lives—a show of which she was a fan. Sweeney was a US dress size 12 (UK dress size 16). She was not overweight by medical standards, but still larger than her television peers. Thus, it became an issue. She documented all the tabloid talk and personal anguish in her 2004 memoir, All The Days of My Life (So Far).

In 2002, she appeared on a celebrity episode of the NBC reality game show Fear Factor. She has appeared in other NBC shows such as Friends, where she played an actress on Days of Our Lives, and Las Vegas. In 2007, she joined the Jerry Lewis MDA Telethon as a co-host for the live television broadcast. She returned to her co-hosting duties for the 2008, 2009, and 2010 telethons.

In 2007, Sweeney took over hosting duties on The Biggest Loser, replacing Caroline Rhea since the fourth season. She was surprised but happy to be offered the role, where she is able to cheer on contestants and share their victories.

Sweeney has written four books: All The Days of My Life (So Far) (released in May 2004), The Star Attraction (released in May 2013), Scared Scriptless: A Novel (released in June 2014) and Opportunity Knocks (released in April 2016).

In July 2013, Sweeney appeared in Second Chances, a Hallmark Original Movie, alongside Days co-star Greg Vaughan. The movie was filmed before Sweeney and Vaughn became siblings on Days of Our Lives.

On January 20, 2014, Sweeney announced on The Ellen DeGeneres Show that after 21 years of being on the air on Days of Our Lives, she was leaving the show, to focus on spending more time with her family, and to work on her other show, The Biggest Loser. She stated in the interview that she would be on the show throughout 2014, and that she would like her character on the show to have a happy ending with a Breaking Bad twist.

On July 9, 2014, it was announced that Sweeney would be joining General Hospital behind the scenes as a director, starting later that month. On April 26, 2015, Sweeney announced that she will be returning to Days of Our Lives to be part of the show's 50th anniversary celebrations.

On August 25, 2015, it was announced that Sweeney would not be returning to The Biggest Loser.

Beginning on October 13, 2017, Sweeney reprised her long-term role as Sami Brady on Days of Our Lives, over 24 years after her first appearance as a teenaged Sami Brady.

She played podcast host Alex McPherson in the Hallmark Movies & Mysteries film series Chronicle Mysteries, which started in 2019, with a fifth movie in 2021.

From 2015 to present, Sweeney appeared in the Hallmark Movies & Mysteries film series Murder, She Baked, based on Joanne Fluke's books.

== Filmography ==
Television
Year	Title	Role	Notes
1984	Simon & Simon	Lyla	Episode: “The Wrong Stuff”
1985	St. Elsewhere	Chrissy	Episode: "Santa Claus Is Dead"
1985	Webster	Beth	Episode: "The Uh-Oh Feeling"
1985	Tales from the Darkside	Karen	Episode: "I Can't Help Saying Goodbye"
1987, 1993–2015, 2017–2022, 2025–	Days of Our Lives	Adrienne Johnson; Sami Brady; Colleen Brady	Role: 1987 – Flashbacks; Role: January 1993 – October 2014; October – November 2015; October – December 2017; August – November 2018; July 2019; June 2020; 2025–present Role: 2007 – September 2007; February 2008 – Flashbacks
1988	Family Man	Rosie Tobin	7 episodes
1989–1990	Brand New Life	Christy McCary	6 episodes
1994	Bay State	Casey Mills	Episodes: "Episode #4.4", "Episode #4.5"
2001	Friends	Jessica Ashley	Episode: "The One With Joey's Award"
2002	Fear Factor	Herself	Episode: "Celebrity Fear Factor"
2004	American Dreams	Miss USA	Episode: "Old Enough to Fight"
2004	Las Vegas	Caroline Pzarchik	Episode: "Nevada State"
2007–2015	The Biggest Loser	Herself	Host (seasons 4–16)
2010	Mercy	Becky Sorensen	Episode: I Did Kill You, Didn't I?
2015	Beat Bobby Flay	Herself	Episode: "Raising the Bar" Judge / Mentor

Films
Year	Title	Role	Notes
1987	The Price of Life	Young Alice	Short film
1990	The End of Innocence	Stephanie (12–15 years old)	
1993	Night Sins	Sami Brady	Television film
2002	Happiness	Girlfriend	Short film
2013	Second Chances, AKA Hearts on Fire	Jenny McLean	Television film (Hallmark)
2015	Murder, She Baked: A Chocolate Chip Cookie Mystery	Hannah Swensen	Television film (Hallmark Movies & Mysteries)
2015	Love on the Air	Sonia	Television film (Hallmark)
2015	Murder, She Baked: A Plum Pudding Mystery	Hannah Swensen	Television film (Hallmark Movies & Mysteries)
2015	Murder, She Baked: A Peach Cobbler Mystery	Hannah Swensen	Television film (Hallmark Movies & Mysteries)
2016	Murder, She Baked: A Deadly Recipe	Hannah Swensen	Television film (Hallmark Movies & Mysteries)
2016	The Irresistible Blueberry Farm	Ellen	Television film (Hallmark Movies & Mysteries)
2017	Murder, She Baked: Just Desserts	Hannah Swensen	Television film (Hallmark Movies & Mysteries)
2017	Christmas At Holly Lodge	Sophie Bennett	Television film (Hallmark Movies & Mysteries)
2019	Chronicle Mysteries: Recovered	Alex McPherson	Television film (Hallmark Movies & Mysteries) First in a series
2019	Chronicle Mysteries: The Wrong Man	Alex McPherson	Television film (Hallmark Movies & Mysteries) Second in a series
2019	Chronicle Mysteries: Vines that Bind	Alex McPherson	Television film (Hallmark Movies & Mysteries) Third in a series
2019	Chronicle Mysteries: The Deep End	Alex McPherson	Television film (Hallmark Movies & Mysteries) Fourth in a series
2019	Time for You to Come Home for Christmas	Katherine Moss	Television film (Hallmark Movies & Mysteries); Executive producer: Blake Shelton
2020	Good Morning Christmas!	Melissa Merry	Television film (Hallmark)
2021	Chronicle Mysteries: Helped to Death	Alex McPherson	Television film (Hallmark Movies & Mysteries) Fifth in a series
2021	Sweet Revenge: A Hannah Swensen Mystery	Hannah Swensen	Television film (Hallmark Movies & Mysteries)
2021	Open By Christmas	Nicky	Television film (Hallmark)
2021	Days of Our Lives: A Very Salem Christmas	Sami Brady	Peacock Original Movie
2022	The Wedding Veil	Tracy Goodwyn	Television Film Trilogy (Hallmark)
2022	The Wedding Veil Unveiled	Tracy Goodwyn	Television Film Trilogy (Hallmark)
2022	The Wedding Veil Legacy	Tracy Goodwyn	Television Film Trilogy (Hallmark)
2022	A Magical Christmas Village	Summer	Television film (Hallmark)
2023	The Wedding Veil Expectations	Tracy Serchio	Television Film Trilogy (Hallmark)
2023	The Wedding Veil Inspiration	Tracy Serchio	Television Film Trilogy (Hallmark)
2023	The Wedding Veil Journey	Tracy Serchio	Television Film Trilogy (Hallmark)
2023	Carrot Cake Murder: A Hannah Swensen Mystery	Hannah Swensen	Television film (Hallmark)
2023	A Zest for Death: A Hannah Swensen Mystery	Hannah Swensen	Television film (Hallmark)
2024	Love and Jane	Lilly Thorpe	Television film (Hallmark)
2024	One Bad Apple: A Hannah Swensen Mystery	Hannah Swensen	Television film (Hallmark)
2024	A Sprinkle of Deceit: A Hannah Swensen Mystery	Hannah Swensen	Television film (Hallmark)
2024	This Time Each Year	Lauren	Television film (Hallmark)
2025	Reality Bites: A Hannah Swensen Mystery	Hannah Swensen	Television film (Hallmark)
2025	To Barcelona, with Love	Erica Olsen	Television film (Hallmark)
2025	To Barcelona, Forever	Erica Olsen	Television film (Hallmark)
2025	A Pie to Die For: A Hannah Swensen Mystery	Hannah Swensen	Television film (Hallmark)
2026	Romance at Hope Ranch	Hope	Television film (Hallmark)
2026	Sugar & Vice: A Hannah Swensen Mystery	Hannah Swensen	Television film (Hallmark)
2026	Best Served Cold: A Hannah Swensen Mystery	Hannah Swensen	Television film (Hallmark)

== Awards and nominations ==
List of acting awards and nominations
Year	Award	Category	Title	Result	Ref.
1994	Young Artist Award	Best Youth Actress in a Soap Opera	Days of Our Lives	Nominated	
1996	Soap Opera Digest Award	Outstanding Villainess	Days of Our Lives	Won	
1997	Young Artist Award	Best Performance in a Daytime Drama: Young Actress	Days of Our Lives	Nominated	
1998	Soap Opera Digest Award	Outstanding Villainess	Days of Our Lives	Won	
1999	Soap Opera Digest Award	Outstanding Villainess	Days of Our Lives	Won	
2000	Soap Opera Digest Award	Outstanding Younger Lead Actress	Days of Our Lives	Nominated	
2001	Soap Opera Digest Award	Outstanding Younger Lead Actress	Days of Our Lives	Won	
2002	Daytime Emmy Award	America's Favorite Villain — Special Fan Award	Days of Our Lives	Won	
2003	Soap Opera Digest Award	Outstanding Supporting Actress	Days of Our Lives	Nominated	
2005	Soap Opera Digest Award	Favorite New Couple (shared with Bryan Dattilo)	Days of Our Lives	Won	
2005	Soap Opera Digest Award	Outstanding Supporting Actress	Days of Our Lives	Won	
2015	Daytime Emmy Award	Outstanding Lead Actress in a Drama Series	Days of Our Lives	Nominated	
2020	Soap Hub Awards	Favorite Social Media Star	Days of Our Lives	Won	
2022	Just Jared Awards	Favorite Hallmark Channel Star of 2022	Herself	Nominated	
