= Lisa Durupt =

Canadian actress

- Born: March 12, 1981 (age 45); Winnipeg, Manitoba, Canada
- Citizenship: Canadian
- Occupation: actress
- Years active: 2002-present
- Spouse: Michael Lyons (m. 2018)
- Children: Everly Violet (b. 2019)

Lisa Durupt is a Canadian actress with appearances on several television shows and movies including Heartland and various Hallmark Channel films like Reunited at Christmas.

== Early life and career ==
Durupt was born and raised in Winnipeg, Manitoba, Canada.

== Personal life ==
She also founded the Tricities Film Studio with Emmy award-winning producer Jim Rapsas and her husband Michael Lyons, run out of Coquitlam which offers a unique sports-oriented approach to the art of acting.

== Filmography ==
=== Film ===
| Year | Film | Role | Notes |
|---|---|---|---|
| 2002 | Everybody's Doing It | Carrie | TV movie |
| 2004 | Shall We Dance? | Dancer | |
| 2008 | The Lazarus Project | Mother in Diner | |
| 2010 | On Strike for Christmas | Laura | TV movie |
| 2011 | The Pastor's Wife | Debbie Johnson | TV movie |
| 2011 | Last Chance Casting | Kelly | TV movie |
| 2012 | Hitched for the Holidays | Molly | TV movie |
| 2012 | The Movie Out Here | Clare | |
| 2013 | The Magic Ferret | Mrs. Parker | Short |
| 2014 | The Color of Rain | Colleen | TV movie |
| 2014 | Honor Student | Shannon | TV movie |
| 2014 | Preggoland | Hillary | |
| 2014 | Run for Your Life | Annabelle Redmond | TV movie |
| 2014 | Santa's Little Ferrets | Claire Collins | TV movie |
| 2014 | Becoming Sophie | Friend In Picture | Short |
| 2015 | I Wanna Date U | Lucy | Short |
| 2015 | Murder, She Baked: A Chocolate Chip Cookie Mystery | Andrea Todd | TV movie |
| 2015 | Kindergarten Da Bin Ich Wieder | Hertha Geisler | Short |
| 2015 | Murder, She Baked: A Plum Pudding Mystery | Andrea Todd | TV movie |
| 2016 | Murder, She Baked: A Peach Cobbler Mystery | Andrea Todd | TV movie |
| 2016 | Rufus | Mom | TV movie |
| 2016 | The Convenient Groom | Stephanie | TV movie |
| 2016 | Murder, She Baked: A Deadly Recipe | Andrea Todd | TV movie |
| 2016 | The Irresistible Blueberry Farm | Susan Porter | TV movie |
| 2016 | The Goodnight Kiss | Amy | Short |
| 2016 | Operation Christmas | Heather Young | TV movie |
| 2016 | A Dream Of Christmas | Nicky | TV movie |
| 2017 | Rufus-2 | Mom | TV movie |
| 2017 | Murder, She Baked: Just Desserts | Andrea Todd | TV movie |
| 2017 | The Perfect Catch | Nina | TV movie |
| 2017 | Garage Sale Mystery: A Case of Murder | Kendahl Hartman | TV movie |
| 2018 | Rufus-2 | Marnie | Short |
| 2018 | Norm of the North: Keys to the Kingdom | Maria (voice) | |
| 2018 | Reunited at Christmas | Annie | TV movie |
| 2018 | Christmas Lost and Found | Gloria Hayes | TV movie |
| 2019 | Benchwarmers 2: Breaking Balls | Dana | |
| 2019 | Chronicle Mysteries: Recovered | Gina DeSavio | TV movie |
| 2019 | Breakthrough | Paula Noble | |
| 2019 | Norm of the North: King Sized Adventure | Maria (voice) | |
| 2019 | Toke is Cheap | Mom | Short |
| 2019 | Puppet Killer | Jessie | |
| 2019 | Holiday Hearts | Olivia | TV movie |
| 2020 | Norm of the North: Family Vacation | Maria (voice) | |
| 2020 | The Main Event | Registration Assistant | |
| 2020 | Love, Guaranteed | Denise | |
| 2020 | Christmas With A Crown | Cassie | TV movie |
| 2021 | To All the Boys: Always and Forever | Mr Kavinsky's Wife | TV movie |
| 2021 | High Flying Romance | Shirley | TV movie |
| 2021 | Time For Them to Come Home for Christmas | Annie | TV movie |
| 2023 | How to Murder Your Husband: The Nancy Brophy Story | Sharon Halsey | TV movie |
| 2023 | A Zest for Death: A Hanna Swenson Mystery | Andrea Todd | TV movie |
| 2023 | Re: Uniting | Morning Show Co-Host | TV movie |
| 2024 | One Bad Apple: A Hannah Swensen Mystery | Andrea Todd | TV movie |
| 2024 | A Sprinkle of Deceit: A Hannah Swensen Mystery | Andrea Todd | TV movie |
| 2024 | Our Holiday Story | Chloe Mendez | TV movie |

=== Television ===
| Year | Show | Role | Notes |
|---|---|---|---|
| 2005 | The Capture of the Green River Killer | Ball Park Manager | Episode: "Part 1 & 2" |
| 2007 | Falcon Beach | Young Mom | Episode: "The Spins" |
| 2008 | The Capture of the Green River Killer | Wife | Episode: "Part 1 & 2" |
| 2008-12 | Less Than Kind | Shandra | Recurring Cast: Season 1-3, Guest: Season 4 |
| 2011 | Psych | Nurse Fleming | Episode: "Shawn Interrupted" |
| 2013 | Supernatural | Choir Lady | Episode: "Holy Terror" |
| 2014 | Girlfriends' Guide to Divorce | Barbie | Episode: "Rule No. 23: Never Lie to the Kids" |
| 2015 | Motive | Karen Hanlon | Episode: "The Amateurs" |
| 2017 | Sunnyhearts Community Centre | Amber | Episode: "Zumba: Part 1 & 2" |
| 2017 | The Arrangement | Chloe Hallstrom | Episode: "Pilot" |
| 2017 | Inconceivable | Ultrasound Tech | Episode: "Here We Go!" |
| 2017 | Date My Dad | Katie | Episode: "But I Really Like the Kids" |
| 2017-21 | Heartland | Jen McMurtry | Recurring Cast: Season 11-14 |
| 2023 | Goosebumps | Rhonda | Episode: "Night of the Living Dummy" |
| 2023 | Creepshow | Helena Belasko | Episode: "Meet the Belaskos" |
| 2024 | Wild Cards | Katrina Johnson | Episode: "Show Me the Murder" |
| 2024 | The Edge of Sleep | Tracey Torres | Recurring Cast |

== Accolades ==
| Year | Awards | Category | Recipient | Outcome |
|---|---|---|---|---|
| 2010 | Gemini Award 2010 | Best Individual Performance in a Comedy Program or Series | Less Than Kind | Nominated |
| 2015 | Leo Awards | Best Supporting Actress | Preggoland | Nominated |
