= Kate Collins (author) =

American novelist

- Education: Purdue University
- Occupation: Novelist
- Children: 2
- Writing career
- Period: 1995-present
- Genres: Romance, mystery, cozy mystery
- Website: www.katecollinsbooks.com

Kate Collins is the author of the best-selling Flower Shop Mystery series.

== Biography ==
Kate Collins, an Indiana native, graduated from Purdue University with a master's degree in education. She taught elementary school for six years. After the birth of her first child, she gave up teaching to pursue a writing career. After writing short humorous stories for children's magazines and working part-time as a legal secretary, she sold her first historical romance novel in 1995. Since then, she has published seven historical romantic suspenses and eight mysteries.

Her books have appeared on The New York Times Best Seller list, Barnes & Noble mass market mystery best-sellers' lists, the Independent Booksellers' best-seller's lists, and booksellers' lists in Australia and England.

Some of her books were adapted for television as the Flower Shop Mysteries in 2016, starring Brooke Shields as florist/detective Abby Knight.

== Bibliography ==
=== The Flower Shop Mysteries ===
1. Mum's the Word, ISBN 0-451-21350-5, Signet, November 2004
2. Slay It With Flowers, ISBN 0-451-21455-2, Signet, March 2005
3. Dearly Depotted, ISBN 0-451-21585-0, Signet, July 2005
4. Snipped in the Bud, ISBN 0-451-21831-0, Signet, May 2006
5. Acts of Violets, ISBN 0-451-22074-9, Signet, March 2007
6. A Rose From the Dead, ISBN 0-451-22241-5, Signet, December 2007
7. Shoots To Kill, ISBN 0-451-22474-4, Signet, August 2008
8. Evil in Carnations, ISBN 0-451-22623-2, Signet, February 2009
9. Sleeping With Anemone, ISBN 0-451-22890-1, Signet, February 2010
10. Dirty Rotten Tendrils, ISBN 0-451-23152-X, Signet, October 2010
11. Night of the Living Dandelion, ISBN 0-451-23301-8, Signet, April 2011
12. To Catch a Leaf, ISBN 0-451-23523-1, Signet, November 2011
13. Nightshade on Elm Street ISBN 0-451-23850-8, Signet, November 6, 2012
14. Seed No Evil, ISBN 978-0-451-41549-3, Signet August 2013
15. Throw in the Trowel, ISBN 978-0451415509, Signet, February 2014
16. A Root Awakening, ISBN 978-0-451-41551-6, Signet, February 2015
17. Florist Grump, ISBN 978-0-698-18508-1, Signet, November 2015
18. Moss Hysteria, ISBN 978-0-698-1-8509-8, Signet, April 5, 2016
19. Yews with Caution,ISBN 978-0451473455, Berkley, May 30, 2017
20. Missing Under the Mistletoe Christmas Novella,ISBN 978-1983147197, independently published, September 18, 2018
21. Tulips Too Late Spring Novella, ISBN 978-1983144929, independently published, June 13, 2018
22. "The Jillian Knight Osborne Fashionista Diaries: A Flower Shop Mystery Short Story", eBook, August 26, 2020
23. A Frond in Need Summer Novella, ISBN 979-8680715321, independently published, August 31, 2020
24. Till Death Do Us Pot Fall Novella, ISBN 979-8560778668, independently published, November 8, 2020
25. Kick the Bouquet, ISBN 979-8366535403, independently published, January 6, 2023
