= Brennan Elliott =

Canadian actor (born 1975)

- Born: 24 March 1975 (age 51); Calgary, Alberta, Canada
- Occupation: Actor
- Years active: 1991–present
- Spouse: Camilla Row (m. 2011; died 2025)
- Children: 2

Brennan Elliott (born 24 March 1975) is a Canadian actor, best known for his role as Dr. Nick Biancavilla in the Lifetime medical drama series, Strong Medicine (2000–2004). Elliott later had recurring roles on The 4400, Cedar Cove and UnREAL.

== Early life ==
Elliott was born in Calgary, Alberta, Canada of Clan Eliott. His father's family originated in North of Ireland. He was educated at the prestigious Actors Studio at the Juilliard School in New York City. One of Elliott's first screen appearances was in the music video for Tom Cochrane's 1991 song Life is a Highway.

== Career ==
Elliott is best known as Dr. Nick Biancavilla in Lifetime's Strong Medicine. Among his most prominent roles are his leading roles in the 1999 movies The Silencer and G-Saviour. Additionally, he had a role in the horror film, Curse of Chucky and a cameo role in the 2014 film Night at the Museum: Secret of the Tomb.

After appearing in episodes of Canadian television series like Madison, Viper, The Outer Limits, Welcome to Paradox, First Wave, The Net and Poltergeist: The Legacy in the 1990s, Elliott has appeared in episodes of American television series like Monk, House M.D., Criminal Minds, CSI: Crime Scene Investigation, The 4400, Cold Case, What About Brian, Castle and Desperate Housewives. Elliott appeared on Grey's Anatomy as the father of a son who is a drug abuser. He made appearances in the series Ghost Whisperer and Private Practice and starred as 9/11 hero Todd Beamer in Flight 93.

In 2013, Elliott began starring as Warren Saget on the Hallmark Channel series, Cedar Cove. In 2015, he was cast in the recurring role of reality dating show host Graham in the Lifetime drama series, UnREAL.

== Personal life ==
Elliott was married to Camilla Row from 2011 until her death in 2025. The couple has two children.

== Filmography ==
Year	Title	Role	Notes
1991	Tom Cochrane: Life Is a Highway	Man in Car	Music video
1996	Stone Coats	Max	Film
1997	Viper	Neil Royce	Guest (1 episode)
1997	Madison	Slick	Guest (3 episodes)
1998	The Outer Limits	Tom	Guest (1 episode)
1998	Welcome to Paradox	Unknown	Guest (1 episode)
1998	The Adventures of Shirley Holmes	Jake Bain	Guest (1 episode)
1998	Dream House	Ray	Television film
1998-99	First Wave	Danny	Guest (2 episodes)
1999	Double Jeopardy	Yuppie Man	Film
1999	The Silencer	Jason Wells/Jason Black	Film
1999	Convergence	Steve	Film
1999	The Net	Clyde Bromeo	Guest (1 episode)
1999	Poltergeist: The Legacy	Tom Claremont	Guest (1 episode)
1999	G-Saviour	Mark Curran	Television film
2000	The Other Side of Monday	Actor	Short
2000–05	Strong Medicine	Dr. Nick Biancavilla	Main (seasons 1–4); Guest (season 6) (88 episodes)
2002	Hobbs End	Michael Bodine	Video
2004	North Shore	David Saltzman	Guest (1 episode)
2004	Monk	Paul Harley	Guest (1 episode)
2004	Without a Trace	Restaurant owner	Guest (1 episode)
2004	House	Adam	Guest (1 episode)
2005	Eyes	Brian Armstrong	Guest (1 episode)
2005	Blind Justice	Nick Irons	Guest (3 episodes)
2005	CSI: Crime Scene Investigation	Sergeant Carroll	Guest (2 episodes)
2006	Flight 93	Todd Beamer	Television film
2006	Cold Case	Ray Williams	Guest (4 episodes)
2006	Women in Law	Ray/Russ	Guest (2 episodes)
2006–07	What About Brian	T.K.	Guest (4 episodes)
2006–07	The 4400	Ben Saunders	Recurring (7 episodes)
2007	Desperate Housewives	Luke Purdue	Guest (1 episode)
2007	Grey's Anatomy	Dave Kristler	Guest (1 episode)
2008	Bones	Mark Gaffney	Guest (1 episode)
2008	Ghost Whisperer	Hunter Clayton	Guest (1 episode)
2008	Knight Rider	Capricorn	Guest (1 episode)
2008	Nanny Express	David Chandler	Television film
2009	Castle	Jason Cosway	Guest (1 episode)
2009	Private Practice	Jake	Guest (1 episode)
2010	CSI: Miami	Julian Diehl	Guest (1 episode)
2010	Drop Dead Diva	Todd Prentiss	Guest (1 episode)
2010	NCIS	Martin Stillwell	Guest (1 episode)
2010	Confession	Steve	Film
2010	Black Widow	Troy	Film
2011	Take Me Home	Eric	Film
2011	I Met a Producer and Moved to L.A.	Rod	Television Film
2012	Cupid, Inc.	Vance	Television Film
2012	Kiss at Pine Lake	Pete Shoreman	Television Film
2012	Murder on the 13th Floor	Viktor	Film
2012	Rizzoli & Isles	Chris Harris	Guest (1 episode)
2012	Flashpoint	Jay Penak	Guest (1 episode)
2013	Monday Mornings	Brian Trottier (uncredited)	Guest (1 episode)
2013	Hawaii Five-0	Brent Mercer	Guest (1 episode)
2013	Criminal Minds	Detective Scott Miller	Guest (1 episode)
2013	Dirty Teacher	Det. Allen	Television film
2013	Curse of Chucky	Ian	Film
2013	Blood Shot	Rip	Film
2013	Heart of Dance	Dr. Norton	Film
2013-15	Cedar Cove	Warren Saget	Main (seasons 1–3) (31 episodes)
2014	Night at the Museum: Secret of the Tomb	Robert Fredericks	Film
2014	The Crazy Ones	Kyle	Guest (1 episode)
2015	All of My Heart	Brian Howell	Television film
2015	A Christmas Melody	Danny Collier	Television film
2015-18	UnREAL	Graham	Recurring (seasons 1–2); Main (seasons 3–4) (38 episodes)
2016	Flower Shop Mystery: Mum's the Word	Marco Salvare	Television film
2016	Flower Shop Mystery: Snipped in the Bud	Marco Salvare	Television film
2016	Flower Shop Mystery: Dearly Depotted	Marco Salvare	Television film
2016	Love You Like Christmas	Kevin Tyler	Television film
2017	All of My Heart: Inn Love	Brian Howell	Television film
2017	Christmas Encore	Julian Walker	Television film
2017	The Catch	Matthew Keegan	Guest (2 episodes)
2018	All of My Heart: The Wedding	Brian Howell	Television film
2018	Christmas at Grand Valley	Leo	Television film
2019	Crossword Mysteries: A Puzzle to Die For	Logan O'Connor	Television film
2019	All Summer Long	Jake	Television film
2019	Crossword Mysteries: Proposing Murder	Logan O'Connor	Television film
2020	Crossword Mysteries: Abracadaver	Logan O'Connor	Television film
2020	Christmas in Vienna	Mark Olsen	Television film
2021	Crossword Mysteries: Terminal Decent	Logan O'Connor	Television film
2021	Crossword Mysteries: Riddle Me Dead	Logan O'Connor	Television film
2021	Open by Christmas	Derrick Marshall	Television film
2022	The Perfect Pairing	Michael	Television film
2022	Marry Go Round	Luke	Television film
2022	The Gift of Peace	Michael	Television film
2023	Ms. Christmas Comes to Town	Travis/Mr. Winters	Television film
2026	A Castle of Our Own	Adam	Television film
