= Suzy K Quinn =

British writer

Suzy K. Quinn
- Born: Susannah Quinn; 12 October 1979 (age 47)
- Writing career
- Years active: 2011–present
- Genres: Cozy crime Murder mystery Book-club fiction Comedy; Thrillers
- Notable works: Bad Mother's Diary series
- Website: suzykquinn.com

Susannah "Suzy" K Quinn (born 12 October 1979) is a British author of cozy crime, murder mysteries and book-club fiction. She is both a published and self-published author and wrote the comedy series Bad Mother's Diary. In 2026, she began the Bob and Shirley cozy crime series with Bob and Shirley's Guide to Murder. Quinn's novels have sold a total of nearly 1 million copies.

== Early life and education ==
Quinn is from Colchester. She began writing as a teenager, when she and her sister Cath entered and jointly won a novel-writing contest; both Quinn and her sister have gone on to become authors since that competition. Quinn studied Sociology at the University of Nottingham.

== Career ==
Quinn worked as a journalist and ghostwriter, writing for a number of British newspapers, including The Guardian, Sunday Times Magazine and The Sun. While working as a journalist, she signed her first book deal with Hodder & Stoughton in 2011 and released a psychological thriller. In 2012, Quinn signed a two-book deal with Hachette Livre and released her novel, "Glass Geishas" The novel was later retitled, Night Girls. The book drew on her experiences of working as a geisha in Japan during her twenties. It follows events in the Roppongi district after a hostess goes missing. The novel has also been published in Russia. What's On Dubai listed the book under its top 10 reads for summer 2012.

In 2015, Quinn published the Bad Mother's Diary, a romantic comedy about new motherhood and single motherhood. The book also became a bestseller. Quinn's Bad Mother's book series began life as a concept for a magazine article. In an interview, Quinn stated she "just couldn't stop writing" once she started the story of Juliette and Nick. The series includes six books, which follow the life of a mother through both motherhood and romance. The first of the "Bad Mother's" series outsold all her other books, reaching first position on the romantic comedy list on Amazon.

In 2018, Quinn signed a two-book deal with HQ Harper Collins for two psychological thrillers, Don't Tell Teacher and Not My Daughter. Don't Tell Teacher reached number 7 in the UK Kindle charts on its release in March 2018. In May 2020, Quinn released "Not My Daughter," a story about a 16-year-old runaway. Not My Daughter reached number 27 in the UK Kindle charts on its May 2020 release.

In 2020, Quinn released her sixth installment, Bad Mother's Virus. The book was written and released during the UK's COVID-19 pandemic, and tells the story of self-isolating mum during lockdown in Quinn's comical style used throughout the Bad Mother series. All proceeds from the book were donated to the NHS.

In 2023, Quinn self-published the book-club comedy (Probably) The Greatest Love Story Ever Told. The book was acquired by publishers in the United States, the United Kingdom, Germany, Brazil, Spain and Italy.

In 2026, Quinn published the Bob and Shirley cozy crime and murder mystery series, beginning with Bob and Shirley's Guide to Murder. The series is based on characters from (Probably) The Greatest Love Story Ever Told.

== Books ==
=== Standalone novels ===
- Night Girls (initially titled Glass Geishas) (2012)
- Show, Don't Tell (October 2013)
- I Take This Woman (2013)
- Don't Tell Teacher (March 2019)
- Not My Daughter (May 2020)
- (Probably) The Greatest Love Story Ever Told (2023)

=== Bob and Shirley's murder mystery series ===
- Bob and Shirley's Guide to Murder (July 2026)
- Bob and Shirley's Death by Hot Chocolate (July 2026)
- Bob and Shirley's Dead Before Pudding (August 2026)

=== Bad mother series ===
- Bad Mother's Diary (July 2015)
- Bad Mother's Detox (February 2017)
- Bad Mother Begins (March 2017)
- Bad Mother's Pregnancy (2017)
- Bad Mother's Holiday (June 2018)
- Bad Mother's Christmas (October 2019)
- Bad Mother's Virus (May 2020)
- Bad Mother’s Wedding (November 2020)

== Personal life ==
She currently lives in Wivenhoe, Essex, with her husband and two daughters.
