= Sandra Bretting =

American novelist

Sandra Lanting Bretting is an American novelist who writes mysteries and historical novels. Her work includes a cozy mystery series for Kensington Publishing Corp. The series, titled the Missy DuBois Mystery series, debuted in 2016. She also is the author of a historical novel and other works of fiction.

A graduate of the University of Missouri School of Journalism, she has written for several newspapers, including the Los Angeles Times, the Houston Chronicle and others. She belongs to ACFW and Sisters in Crime and the Writers' League of Texas.

== Books ==
Nonfiction: Shameless Persistence: Lessons From a Modern Miracle (2019)

=== Standalone Mysteries ===
- Unholy Lies (2012)
- Bless the Dying (2014)

=== The Missy DuBois Mystery Series ===
- Murder at Morningside (2016)
- Something Foul at Sweetwater (2016)
- Someone's Mad at the Hatter (2017)
- Death Comes to Dogwood Manor (2018)
- All Hats on Deck (2019)
