= Rebecca Staab =

American actress (born 1961)

- Occupation: Actress
- Years active: 1985–present
- Known for: Port Charles

Rebecca Staab is an American actress and beauty pageant titleholder.

== Early life ==
Staab won the Miss Nebraska USA title and competed in the Miss USA 1980 pageant that year, where she placed in the Top 12.

== Career ==
Staab made her television debut on Guiding Light in 1985 and appeared in several other shows over the years, including Cheers, Beverly Hills, 90210, The Wonder Years, Seinfeld, Dharma & Greg, Columbo, NCIS, The Mentalist, Desperate Housewives, Live Shot, Port Charles, and The Young and the Restless.

Staab has appeared in several Hallmark Channel television films and has a recurring role in the Chronicle Mysteries series.

== Personal life ==
Staab has been in a relationship with soap opera actor William deVry since 2007.

== Selected filmography ==
=== Film ===
Year	Film	Role	Notes
1991	The Marrying Man	Arlene	
1992	Love Potion No. 9	Cheryl	
1994	The Fantastic Four	Susan Storm / Invisible Woman	Unreleased
1997	Quiet Days in Hollywood	Amelie	
1999	Stray Bullet	Stella Crosby	
1999	The Substitute 3: Winner Takes All	Professor Nicole Stewart	
2001	A House on a Hill	Kate Banks	
2009	Love at First Hiccup	Constance	
2009	All Ages Night	Dennie Murphy	
2012	A Perfect Ending	Sylvie	
2014	Between Doors	Wendy	Short film
2015	Doomed!: The Untold Story of Roger Corman's The Fantastic Four	Herself	Documentary
2016	Surge of Power: Revenge of the Sequel	Heart	
2018	The Miracle Season	Bethany Fliehler	
2019	Surge of Dawn	Heart	
2019	Breakthrough	Cindy Rieger	
2019	La Buena	Joann	Short film
2021	Love Hard	Barb Lin	
2025	The Fantastic Four: First Steps	Channel 9 Newscaster Carolyn Haynes	Cameo appearance

=== Television ===
Year	Film / Show	Role	Notes
1985, 1987	Guiding Light	Jessie Matthews	2 episodes
1990	The Young Riders	Jenny	Episode: "The Play's the Thing"
1990	Columbo	Tina	Episode: "Columbo Cries Wolf"
1991	Dark Shadows	Daphne Collins	3 episodes
1991–1992	Beverly Hills, 90210	Deidre	Season 2; 2 episodes
1992	Cheers	Debbie	Episode: "Smotherly Love"
1992	Likely Suspects	Darcy Lowell	Episode: "Pilot"
1992	The Wonder Years	Miss Lisa Farmer	Season 6; Episode: "Sex and Economics"
1992	Bob	Linda	Episode: "Penny for your Thoughts"
1992	The Hat Squad	Nikki	Episode: "Rest in Peace"
1993	Love & War	Woman	Episode: "I Only Have Eyes for You"
1993	Renegade	Kat Calhoun	Episode: "Endless Summer"
1993	Trade Winds	Ellen Sommers	TV Miniseries; 2 episodes
1994	Seinfeld	Kristin	Season 6; Episode: "The Pledge Drive"
1994	Ellen	Cindy	Episode: "The Toast"
1995	Home Improvement	Debbie Carver	Episode: "Bachelor of the Year"
1995	Live Shot	Sherry Beck	13 episodes
1994–1996	One West Waikiki	Rebecca Dunn	3 episodes
1996	Chicago Hope	Simone	Episode: "Liar, Liar"
1997	Viper	Dr. Valerie Reed	Episode: "Manhunt"
1998	Night Man	Assistant District Attorney Howarth	Episode: "Bad Moon Rising"
1998	Players	Corky Wallace	Episode: "Confidence Man"
1999	Diagnosis Murder	Betsy	Episode: "The Flame"
2001	Dharma & Greg	Judy	Episode: "Judy & Greg"
2001	It's Like, You Know...	Audrey	Episode: "The Quick and the Dead"
2002	The Drew Carey Show	Melanie	Episode: "Look Mom, One Hand"
2002–2003	Port Charles	Elizabeth Barrington	40 episodes
2004	Nip/Tuck	Gwen Camden	Season 2; Episode: "Sean McNamara"
2004	NCIS	Greta Boyen	Season 2; Episode: "Terminal Leave"
2005	CSI: NY	Jessica Freemont	Season 2; Episode: "Zoo York"
2006	CSI: Crime Scene Investigation	Chelsea	Season 6; Episode: "Daddy's Little Girl"
2007	Las Vegas	Rita Powell	Episode: "Head Games"
2008	The Young and the Restless	April Stevens	2 episodes
2008	The Cleaner	Judy Astor	Episode: "Pilot"
2009	The Mentalist	Monica Dunninger	Season 2; Episode: "Redemption"
2009	Desperate Housewives	Stephanie	Season 6; "Everybody Ought to Have a Maid"
2010	Criminal Minds	Lorraine Horton	Season 5; Episode: "Parasite"
2010	Dicks	Trudy Turnbow	TV movie
2012	Glee	Mrs. Collins	Season 3; "Choke"
2012	Fairly Legal	Unknown Role	Episode: "Finale"
2016	The Irresistible Blueberry Farm	Cynthia Branford	Hallmark Movies & Mysteries TV Movie
2017	Moonlight in Vermont	Delia Grangely	Hallmark Channel TV Movie
2017	Somewhere Between	Colleen DeKizer	6 episodes
2017	Coming Home for Christmas	Camille	Hallmark Channel TV Movie
2018	Road to Christmas	Lois Baker	Hallmark Channel TV Movie
2018	Mingle All the Way	Helen Lange	Hallmark Channel TV Movie
2018	Christmas Bells are Ringing	Helen	Hallmark Movies & Mysteries TV Movie
2019	A Christmas Miracle	Miss Hennessy	Hallmark Movies & Mysteries TV Movie
2019–2021	Chronicle Mysteries	Eileen Bruce	Hallmark Movies & Mysteries TV Movie Series
2020	Christmas by Starlight	Pat Park	Hallmark Channel TV Movie
2021	The Santa Stakeout	Lois Carmichael	Hallmark Channel TV Movie
2021	Christmas in Tahoe	Dorothy Rhodes	Hallmark Channel TV Movie
2022	Cut, Color, Murder	Mitzi Stewart	Hallmark Channel TV Movie
2023	The Night Agent	Cynthia Hawkins	Episode: "The Marionette"
2023–2024	Superman & Lois	Cheryl Kimble / "Gretchen Kelley"	3 episodes
