= Gabriel Hogan =

Canadian actor

- Born: 17 May 1973 (age 53); Toronto, Ontario, Canada
- Occupation: Actor
- Years active: 1988–present
- Spouse: Inga Cadranel
- Children: 2
- Parents: Michael Hogan (father); Susan Hogan (mother)

Gabriel Hogan (born May 17, 1973) is a Canadian actor. He is best known for his role on the comedy series Tacoma FD, drama series Heartland and thriller series Condor.

== Early and personal life ==
Hogan was born in Toronto, Ontario, and raised in the Yorkville neighbourhood. He is the middle sibling of three children. His parents Michael and Susan Hogan, along with his older sister Jennie Rebecca Hogan (born 1971) and younger brother Charlie Hogan (born 1983), are also actors.

He is married to actress Inga Cadranel. They have a son and daughter together.

== Career ==
=== Television ===
Hogan's highest profile roles to date have been in television. He is featured as Peter Morris on the western ranch show Heartland, and also Ike Crystal in the truTV comedy Tacoma FD, which was cancelled in early 2024 after four seasons.

His other television credits include the series Prince of Peoria, Condor, Playmakers, Angela's Eyes, Rent-A-Goalie, This Is Wonderland, Heartland, Peter Benchley's Amazon and Robson Arms.

Hogan is an ice hockey fan and proficient player, and several of his credits are hockey related; in 2006, he was part of a documentary-style miniseries about hockey in Canada, called Canada Russia '72. His notable American television credits include a short stint on the acclaimed show Wonderfalls in 2004, playing a lovesick delivery man in two episodes of the short-lived show.

He was cast to play Roland "Rolie" Cray on Flashpoint in 2008, but Hogan decided to leave the show after the pilot episode. Sam Braddock (played by David Paetkau) took his spot on the SRU team.

Hogan also played the role of Joseph P. Kennedy Jr. in the 2011 miniseries The Kennedys, and played the lead male role of "Ken Stoddard" in the Hallmark movie Christmas Song in 2012. He appeared in two additional movies for Hallmark Channel, Christmas at Cartwright's in 2014 and Christmas List in 2017.

In 2011 and 2012, he also appeared in both seasons of the Canadian police series King as Jessica King's husband and fellow cop Danny Sless.

In 2015, Hogan played a Chimera named Belasko in the season 5 premiere of MTV's cult television show Teen Wolf but was killed off by the end of the episode. In 2016, he appeared in the twelfth episode of the first season of Lady Dynamite. He has also had recurring roles in shows such as Warehouse 13, The Border and The Best Years.

=== Film ===
Hogan's film credits include Blue City Slammers, Head in the Clouds and Moving Day.

=== Video games ===
- Dino Crisis 2 (2000) – voice as Dylan Morton

== Filmography ==
=== Film ===
Year	Title	Role	Notes
1988	Blue City Slammers	Joe	
1994	Red Scorpion 2	Unknown (uncredited)	
1997	Love and Death on Long Island	Jake	
1999	Blind	The date	Short film
2002	Winter Sun	Duncan	Short film
2004	Head in the Clouds	Julian Elsworth	
2004	Show Me	Carl	
2008	Transit Lounge	Mark	Short film
2008	One Week	Dereck Vincent	
2012	Moving Day	AJ	
2012	A Man's World	Paul	
2013	Ice Soldiers	Frozen #1	
2014	The Heckler	2nd Workshop Comedian	
2014	The Day Santa Didn't Come	Syd	Short film
2015	I Spit on Your Grave III: Vengeance is Mine	Detective McDylan	
2016	Give Me My Baby	Nate	

=== Television ===
Year	Title	Role	Notes
1988	Night Heat	Mark	Episode: 4.6 "Blowing Bubbles"
1994	Forever Knight	Young Soldier	Episode: 2.11 "Cant Run, Cant Hide"
1995	Kung Fu: The Legend Continues	Little Tony	Episode: 3.11 "Goodbye Mr. Caine"
1996	The Halfback of Notre Dame	Crazy	TV film
1996	Sins of Silence	Restaurant Patron (uncredited)	TV film
1996–2000	Traders	Ian Farnham	Main (seasons 3–5)
1997	Elvis Meets Nixon	Bobby Bishop	TV film
1997	Pit Pony	Ned Hall	TV film
1997	Peacekeepers	Lt. Bobby Danko	TV film
1998	PSI Factor: Chronicles of the Paranormal	Jarred MacKeigan	Episode: 2.11 "Hell Week"
1998	Flood: A River's Rampage	Bobby Dupree	TV film
1998	Power Play	Bobby Gunn	Episode: 1.7 "The Bad Boy"
1999	La Femme Nikita	Jamey	Episode: 3.11 "Walk on By"
1999	Shadow Lake	Steve Richards	TV film
1999–2000	Amazon	Falconer John	Recurring role (season 1)
2000	Dino Crisis 2	Dylan Morton (English Version, voice)	Video game
2001	The Industry	Kyle	Episode: 3.8 "Happiest Girl in the World"
2001	Stolen Miracle	Const. Graham Taylor	TV film
2001–2002	The Associates	Mitch Barnsworth	Main role (seasons 1–2)
2002	Mutant X	Josh Marcus	Episode: 2.7 "Crossroads of the Soul"
2002	Chasing Cain: Face	Unknown	TV film
2003	Tom Stone	Simon Marks	Episode: 2.8 "Busted Shoulder"
2003	The One	Gordie Parks	TV film
2003	Playmakers	Guard Dog Fredericks	Recurring role (season 1)
2003	Blue Murder	Christian Paquette	Episode: 3.5 "Ladykillers"
2004	Blue Murder	Detective Wayne Tocchet	Episode: 4.3 "Boys' Club"
2004	Perfect Strangers	Harvey Truelove	TV film
2004	Wonderfalls	Thomas	Episode: 1.1 "Wax Lion", Episode: 1.9 "Safety Canary"
2004	A Beachcombers Christmas	Peter Englewood	TV film
2004	Crazy Canucks	Scott Henderson	TV film
2005	Tilt	Brad	Episode: 1.2 "Risk Tolerance"
2005	Widow on the Hill	Rick	TV film
2005	The Collector	Heinrich	Episode: 2.13 "Beginnings"
2005	Million Dollar Murder	Matt	TV film
2005	Mayday	Daniel McVary	TV film
2005	Heritage Minutes	Andrew Mynarski	Episode: 5.6 "Andrew Mynarski"
2006	This Is Wonderland	Randy	Episode: 3.7 "Episode #3.7"
2006	Hayday!	Dave Sterling	TV film
2006	Billable Hours	Brad	Episode: 1.1 "The Nicotine Gum"
2006	Angela's Eyes	Father Robert Malloy	Episode: 1.3 "In God's Eyes"
2006	Canada Russia '72	Ken Dryden	Episode: 1.1 "Episode #1.1", Episode: 1.2 "Episode #1.2"
2006–2008	Rent a Goalie	Lance	Main role (seasons 1–3)
2007	Robson Arms	Andrew Colton	Main role (season 2)
2007	The Best Years	Patrick Ferrell	Recurring role (season 1)
2007	Nature of the Beast	Archer	TV film
2007	Matters of Life and Dating	Kevin	TV film
2007	St. Urbain's Horseman	Luke Scott	Miniseries
2008	Wisegal	Robert Wilford	TV film
2008	Bridal Fever	Jake Tyler	TV film
2008	Flashpoint	Roland "Rolie" Cray	Episode: 1.1 "Scorpio", Episode: 1.6 "Attention Shoppers"
2008	Of Murder and Memory	Danny	TV film
2008	Accidental Friendship	Kevin Brawner	TV film
2008	The Border	Jimmy Kosik	Episode: 2.5 "Peak Oil", Episode: 2.10 "Double Dealing"
2009	Everything She Ever Wanted	Dan Hollister	Miniseries
2009–2010	The Dating Guy	Anderson Anderson & Jenshrew the Alien (voice)	Recurring role (seasons 1–2)
2009, 2011	Warehouse 13	Sam Martino	Episode: 1.1 "Pilot", Episode: 1.9 "Regrets", Episode: 3.7 "Past Imperfect"
2009–2022	Heartland	Peter Morris	Recurring role
2010	Murdoch Mysteries	Constable Randall Tonwsend	Episode: 3.2 "The Great Wall"
2010	The Bridge	Kovinsky	Episode: 1.4 "Vexation of Spirit", 1.6 "God Bless the Child"
2010	The Devil's Teardrop	Len Hardy	TV film
2010	A Heartland Christmas	Peter Morris	TV film
2011	The Kennedys	Joe Kennedy Jr.	Miniseries
2011	Wishing Well	Griffin	TV film
2011–2012	King	Danny Sless	Main role (seasons 1–2)
2012	Christmas Song	Ken Stoddard	TV film
2013	Cracked	Terry Dwyer	Episode: 1.8 "The Thump Parade"
2013	Still Life: A Three Pines Mystery	Peter Morrow	TV film
2014	The Listener	Greg Turner	Episode: 5.8 "White Whale"
2014	Christmas at Cartwright's	Bill Maloney	TV film
2015	Murder, She Baked: A Chocolate Chip Cookie Mystery	Norman Rhodes	TV film
2015	Teen Wolf	Belasko	Episode: 5.1 "Creatures of the Night"
2015	NCIS	Navy Seal Commander Pete Grady	Episode: 13.8 "Saviors"
2015	Murder, She Baked: A Plum Pudding Mystery	Norman Rhodes	TV film
2015	Last Chance for Christmas	John	TV film
2016	Murder, She Baked: A Peach Cobbler Mystery	Norman Rhodes	TV film
2016	Lady Dynamite	Craig	Episode: 1.12 "Enter Super Grisham"
2016	Murder, She Baked: A Deadly Recipe	Norman Rhodes	TV film
2016	Christmas List	Jamie Houghton	TV film
2017	Murder, She Baked: Just Desserts	Norman Rhodes	TV film
2017	Sea Change	Ramsay	TV film
2017	Wisdom of the Crowd	Rob Forsythe	Episode: 1.9 "Proof of Concept"
2017	Agents of S.H.I.E.L.D.	Crixon	Episode: 5.20 "The One Who Will Save Us All"
2018	Condor	Boyd Ferris	Recurring role (season 1)
2018–2019	Prince of Peoria	Joosep	Recurring role
2019–2023	Tacoma FD	Ike Crystal	Main role
2019	Raven's Home	Sergeant Flex	Episode: 3.15 "Sorry to Father You"
2021	Sweet Revenge: A Hannah Swensen Mystery	Norman Rhodes	TV film
2023	Carrot Cake Murder: A Hannah Swensen Mystery	Norman Rhodes	TV film
2023	My Christmas Hero	Major Daniel Ross	TV film
2024	One Bad Apple: A Hannah Swensen Mystery	Norman Rhodes	TV film
2024	Lincoln Lawyer	Officer	Episode 3.10 "The Gods of Guilt"
2026	Romance at Hope Ranch	Jack	TV film
2026	The Way Home	Grayson Goodwin	
2026	The Hawk	Jerry	Netflix series
