= Doomed!: The Untold Story of Roger Corman's The Fantastic Four =

- Theatrical release poster
- Directed by: Marty Langford
- Written by: Marty Langford
- Produced by: Mark Grove; Mark Sikes
- Starring: Carl Ciarfalio; Roger Corman; Joseph Culp; Jonathan Fernandez; Glenn Garland; Kat Green; Chris Gore; Sean Howe; Alex Hyde-White; Lloyd Kaufman; Oley Sassone; Mark Sikes; Michael Bailey Smith; Rebecca Staab; Jay Underwood; John Vulich
- Cinematography: Oktay Ortabasi
- Edited by: Marty Langford
- Music by: Davis Horgan
- Distributed by: Uncork'd Entertainment
- Release date: 10 July 2015
- Running time: 85 minutes
- Country: United States
- Language: English
- Budget: $5,926

Doomed!: The Untold Story of Roger Corman's The Fantastic Four is a 2015 documentary film about the troubled production of the unreleased Fantastic Four film from 1994. The documentary consists of interviews of individuals who were closely involved in the making of the film, including the cast, Oley Sassone (director), and Glenn Garland (editor).

== Reception ==
The review aggregation website Rotten Tomatoes reported an 88% approval rating based on 8 reviews.

Scott Collura of IGN gave the film a rating of 6.8, indicating "okay". He described it as, "...a pretty interesting (if blandly assembled) journey..." Scott Weinberg of Nerdist gave the film a 4/5 star rating and said, "...[the film] cover[s] all the pertinent facts in relation to this infamous production, but it does so in a crisp, entertaining, and smoothly informative fashion. Eric Walkuski of JoBlo.com gave the film an 8/10 star rating and said: "Director Marty Langford keeps the doc moving along very well, with nary a bump in the road," and "Even grade-Z movies deserve to be loved, and DOOMED quite expertly shines a light on one such case."

Jim Tudor of Screen Anarchy said: "The information is dense and a bit dry at times, but for a movie of its ilk, [the film] is well done, even entertaining." David Craig of Starburst Magazine gave the film a 7/10 star rating: "[The film] is a very competent retelling of a strange series of events but one which might struggle to stand out from the crowd, and perhaps isn't destined to find an audience outside of the niche community of comic-book fans to whom Corman's feature has become well-known."
