= Christmas at Cartwright's =

- Genre: Romance
- Written by: Margaret Oberman
- Directed by: Graeme Campbell
- Starring: Alicia Witt; Gabriel Hogan; Wallace Shawn
- Composer: Sean Nimmons-Paterson
- Countries of origin: United States; Canada
- Original language: English

Production
- Executive producers: Howard Braunstein; Patricia Heaton; David Hunt; Deborah Marks; A.J. Morewitz; Thomas Walden; Thomas Mark Walden
- Producers: Steve Solomos; David Anselmo
- Cinematography: Peter Benison
- Editor: Roger Mattiussi
- Running time: 84 min.

Original release
- Network: Hallmark Channel
- Release: December 7, 2014

Christmas at Cartwright's (titled as 'Santa's Secret' in the UK) is a 2014 American-Canadian romance television film directed by Graeme Campbell and starring Alicia Witt, Gabriel Hogan and Wallace Shawn.

Written by Margaret Oberman, the film is about a single mom who gets a holiday job as a department store Santa to pay her rent. An angel (Wallace Shawn) enters her life and brings about some positive changes, including the spark of a new romance.

== Plot ==
Single mother Nicky Talbot ends up taking a job as a store Santa at Cartwright's due to the encouragement of Harry Osbourne, a consultant from corporate headquarters, but must hide that she is a woman. Prior to this she had attempted to gain other seasonal work with the store, only for the store's Senior VP, Fiona Aldrich to reject her application out of fear that she would jeopardize a potential relationship with Bill, a charming and handsome store manager.

Nicky and Bill form a romantic relationship while she is not in costume, leading to a date that ends early due to her guilt over not being able to confide in him. She also feels guilt that Bill has been seeking advice from "Santa" for their blossoming relationship, unaware that it is her. Nicky is eventually discovered by a coworker while she is changing into her costume and brought to Fiona's office, where she is accused of shoplifting the suit. During this Bill enters the office and learns of Nicky's duplicity, which causes him to end their relationship. Fiona takes this as an opportunity to fire Nicky under the excuse of bad publicity.

That same day the media begins to report on Nicky's firing and that she only took the job to provide for her daughter, prompting customers to line up around the store to support her. Nicky goes to Cartwright's, where she learns that Fiona has been fired due to bad publicity. She also discovers that "Harry" never worked at the store. Her daughter Becky later theorizes that he was an angel sent to help them. Nicky is ultimately given Fiona's job and is able to reconcile with Bill at her home, as he missed her. The film ends with Harry watching Nicky, Becky, and Bill enjoying the Christmas evening together, telling his boss that his work here is done.

== Cast ==
- Alicia Witt as Nicky Talbot
- Gabriel Hogan as Bill
- Wallace Shawn as Harry Osbourne
- T.J. McGibbon as Becky Talbot
- Linda Kash as Peg Habershaw
- Gabrielle Miller as Fiona Aldrich
- Jayne Eastwood as Mrs. Rositani
- Ron Lea as Mr. Mattews
- Miku Graham as Liz
- Marsha Regis as Mrs. Laurence
- Kerry Lai Fatt as Sarah
- Andre Richards as Santa's Helper #2
- Nneka Elliot as Tina Richards
- Catherine-rain Wilcox as Sophie
- Zenna Hilliard as Grace

== Release ==
The film premiered on the Hallmark Channel on December 7, 2014. Ratings for the film were high; per The Futon Critic the movie had 4.1 million total viewers and 6.2 million unduplicated viewers for its release. Christmas at Cartwright's was rated " #1 among HHs (3.6 rtg.) and #2 among total viewers (1.9 rtg.)."

The Hallmark Channel has described the film as one of their highest-rated premieres, as of 2018.

== Reception ==
Dove.org awarded the movie its family friendly certification, stating that it was a "delight for the entire family, and not just at Christmas time." CinemaBlend has described the film as a "Classic Hallmark Christmas movie" as it is "an equal opportunity movie, giving Christmas movie fans one of the very few female versions of Santa Claus. The Hallmark movie also has all the things that create endearing Christmas movies: holiday love, adorable children, angels, and Santa Claus."

In December 2020 Parade Magazine ranked the film as one of "the 35 Best Hallmark Holiday Movies of All Time".
