= Flower Shop Mysteries =

American television film series

- Genre: Mystery film
- Written by: Kate Collins; Gary Goldstein; Neal Dobrofsky; Tippi Dobrofsky
- Directed by: Bradley Walsh
- Starring: Brooke Shields; Brennan Elliott
- Countries of origin: United States; Canada
- Original language: English
- No. of episodes: 3

Production
- Executive producers: Nancy Bennett; Brooke Shields; Bredley Walsh; Susie Belzberg; Damian Lee; Jimmy Townsend; Brad Krevoy; Eric Jarboe; Amanda Phillips Atkins
- Producer: David Anselmo
- Running time: 84–87 minutes

Original release
- Network: Hallmark Movies & Mysteries
- Release: January 17 – June 26, 2016

Flower Shop Mysteries is a 2016 American television film series that aired originally on a predecessor to the Hallmark Mystery channel. The series is available for streaming via Hallmark+.

Its three films star Brooke Shields and Brennan Elliott and were filmed in the US and Canada. Each is based on a same-named novel by Kate Collins.

The series centers around florist and ex-New York City lawyer Abby Knight (Shields) and her involvement in criminal investigations with local ex-private investigator and bar owner Marco Salvare (Elliott).

== Cast and characters ==
- Abby Knight (Brooke Shields) owns a flower shop and is an ex-lawyer.
- Marco Salvare (Brennan Elliott) used to be a private investigator and now owns a local bar.
- Nikki Bender (Kate Drummond) is Abby's co-worker and best friend.
- Jeffrey Knight (Beau Bridges) is Abby's father.
- Sydney Knight (Celeste Desjardins) is Abby's daughter.

== History ==
With over a dozen films planned, the Flower Shop Mysteries series came to an abrupt end when Shields left her contract with Hallmark. She wrote in 2025 that she had decided being a Hallmark star was not the future she wanted. Shields also wrote of her belief that a comedy element she valued had already diminished by the third installment of the series.

== List of films ==
No.	Title	Directed by	Written by	Original release date
1	"Flower Shop Mystery: Mum's the Word"	Bradley Walsh	Kate Collins, Gary Goldstein	January 17, 2016
Abby Knight returns to her small home town having left her career as a NYC lawyer. On the day her flower shop opens, her car gets damaged by someone fleeing a murder scene. An old school friend who is now somewhat down and out is under suspicion. Abby soon meets a charming bartender and partners with him in the search for answers.
2	"Flower Shop Mystery: Snipped in the Bud"	Bradley Walsh	Kate Collins, Gary Goldstein	April 24, 2016
Abby delivers a black roses order from an anonymous client to be given to a college professor. On campus she bumps into an old rival. Later, she finds him murdered. She becomes prime suspect. Her daughter attends the college and is later put in danger.
3	"Flower Shop Mystery: Dearly Depotted"	Bradley Walsh	Kate Collins, Neal H. Dobrofsky, Tippi Dobrofsky	June 26, 2016
Abby becomes a reluctant bridesmaid at a wedding. She ends up not just doing the flowers, but investigating who murdered a wedding crasher.
