= G-Saviour =

1999 television film directed by Graeme Campbell

- G-Saviour poster and DVD cover
- Genre: Military science fiction Mecha
- Based on: Mobile Suit Gundam by Yoshiyuki Tomino & Hajime Yatate
- Screenplay by: Mark Amato; Stephanie Pena-Sy
- Story by: Stephanie Pena-Sy
- Directed by: Graeme Campbell
- Starring: Brennan Elliott; Enuka Okuma; Catharina Conti; David Lovgren
- Theme music composer: John Debney; Louis Febre
- Countries of origin: United States; Japan
- Original language: English

Production
- Producers: Kouichi Inoue; Chris Dobbs
- Cinematography: Joel Ransom
- Editor: Rick Martin
- Running time: 93 minutes
- Production companies: Polestar Entertainment; Sunrise

Original release
- Network: TV Asahi
- Release: December 29, 2000

G-Saviour (Japanese: Gセイバー, Hepburn: Jī-Seibā) is a 1999 joint US-Japan live-action television film, filmed in Canada and created as part of the Gundam anime franchise, produced by Polestar Entertainment under the supervision of Sunrise and distributed by Bandai Visual.

The film was produced as part of the "Gundam Big Bang Project", which was a series of works made to celebrate the 20th anniversary of the Gundam franchise. Set in the Universal Century timeline, G-Saviour was produced as a joint effort between the animation studio and creator of Gundam, Sunrise, and an independent film production company, Polestar Entertainment. The film was theatrically screened at a festival in Japan on June 18, 1999, and was first broadcast on December 29, 2000, from 16:00 to 17:25 on TV Asahi and its affiliate ANN stations.

== Plot ==
The year is Universal Century 0223. The former Earth Federation has collapsed, and the space colonies have shaken off their colonial pasts and now refer to themselves as independent space "Settlements". In this new power scheme two factions have emerged: the Congress of Settlement Nations (CONSENT), which is largely made up of the former Earth Federation government and Sides 2, 3, 5, 6, 7, and the Settlement Freedom League, composed of Sides 1, 4, and the Lunar Cities.

Mark Curran is an ex-CONSENT pilot who now works for Hydro-Gen, an independent research facility located at the Deep Face Trench. While out on a harvesting run, Mark saves CONSENT lieutenant Tim Holloway. Shortly after the lieutenant is saved, the lab is commandeered by the Congressional Armed Forces, led by Mark's former superior, Jack Halle. As the facility's security system is triggered, Mark goes off to investigate. Mark saves one of the intruders, Cynthia Graves, from Jack's firing squad after she surrenders, while another intruder is killed by the gunfire.

The CONSENT is in the midst of a global food shortage, with its military leaders threatening force to take over the neutral Side 8 Settlement of Gaea. General Garneuax asks Mark to interrogate Cynthia, who is revealed to be a Gaean rebel. Mark helps Cynthia escape, who shows him an enzyme that allows food to grow underwater, which can solve the food shortage. The two meet up with Cynthia's interns, Franz Dieter and Kobi, and the group escape into space along with Mark's fiancée Mimi Devere. Meanwhile, Jack frames Mark for the murder of a CONSENT soldier, whom Jack had killed himself. The group arrives at the Side 4 Settlement of New Manhattan, meeting with Philippe San Simeone, an old acquaintance of Mark, and a member of the Illuminati, a private paramilitary organization. Philippe entrusts Mark with a new prototype mobile suit, the G-Saviour, but he refuses to pilot it. Mark changes his mind to help clear a path through a debris field on the way to Gaea.

Arriving at Gaea, Mark and Cynthia meet with Chief Councilor Graves, Cynthia's father. Graves tell them that a Congressional Armed Forces fleet is on its way to Gaea, looking to apprehend the two and the enzyme sample. After seeing Mark and Cynthia share a kiss, Mimi hacks into Gaea's defense system, causing debris clearing guns to fire at a CONSENT ship. After Mark concludes that a mobile suit carrier is on its way to attack Gaea, Cynthia asks Mark to lead Gaea's mobile suit force against the approaching CONSENT forces. Both sides launch their mobile suit forces, with CONSENT greatly outmatching Gaea's obsolete RGM-196 Freedom mobile suits. Jack sorties out in the CAMS-13 MS-Rai, with Mark engaging him in battle with the G-Saviour. Congressional Armed Forces enter Gaea, with Kobi being critically wounded while trying to protect the enzyme sample. After retrieving the sample, Garneuax reveals his true intentions to destroy the sample and implement a policy of selective starvation across the CONSENT. With Gaea's forces dwindling, Philippe and the Illuminati's forces arrive and push back the CONSENT attack. Jack is defeated by Mark and the G-Saviour, who enter Gaea to disable the remaining CONSENT forces.

Garneuax and his forces, along with Mimi, escape from the Settlement in a Gaean space shuttle. Mimi reveals that she switched out the enzyme sample, which is back in the possession of Cynthia, as the shuttle is shot down by CONSENT forces. With Garneuax dead and Jack incapacitated, the Congressional Armed Forces withdraw from Gaea. Councilor Graves gives a speech stating that Side 8 will stay independent, while Mark returns to Earth with Cynthia.

== Cast ==
Character	Canadian actor	Japanese voice actor
Mark Curran	Brennan Elliott	Masato Hagiwara
Cynthia Graves	Enuka Okuma	Ryoko Shinohara
Mimi Devere	Catarina Conti	Yumi Takada
Lieutenant Colonel Jack Halle	David Lovgren	Takaya Hashi
General Garneaux	Kenneth Welsh	Russell Ishii
Franz Dieter	Alfonso Quijada	Takayasu Komiya
Kobi	Taayla Markell	Rei Sakuma
Chief Councilor Graves	Blu Mankuma	Kenji Utsumi
Philippe San Simeone	Hrothgar Mathews	Toshihiko Kojima
Simmons	Brendan Beiser	Kenichi Ono
Dagget	Marlowe Dawn	Emi Shinohara
Lieutenant Tim Holloway	Peter Williams	Naoki Bandō
Barkeep	Christopher Shyer	Kiyoyuki Yanada

== Production ==
In October 1995, work began on the G-Saviour multimedia project, beginning with the production of a promotional trailer to pitch the film to Sunrise. This promotional trailer was completed in March 1997.

Production on the film began in June 1998 and was intended, along with the Turn-A Gundam television series, to be the centerpiece of the "Gundam Big Bang Project", which was the 20th anniversary celebration for the popular Gundam metaseries. The G-Saviour film is part of the G-Saviour multimedia project, which encompasses several forms of media, including a radio drama, novel, and video game. Gundam co-creator Yoshiyuki Tomino was not involved in this production.

The film's actors are predominantly from Canada, and the Japanese language version has Japanese dubbed into the film. Most of the set locations, such as the Orpheum Theatre and Simon Fraser University Burnaby campus, were located in the Metro Vancouver area in British Columbia, Canada. While Canada was used heavily in the film, it's not inherently a Canadian film, despite many erroneous claims over the years, which Yoshie Kawahara, wife of Producer Inoue on the project, has specifically called out on her blog.

G-Saviour is unique among Gundam animated and live-action properties in that the word "Gundam" is not in the title, or used at all throughout the film's run. It was the second attempt at producing a live-action Gundam feature, after the 1997 interactive video game Gundam 0079: The War for Earth.

== Home video ==
The film was released on VHS and DVD on May 25, 2001, in Japan. The original English language version was released on DVD on January 22, 2002.

== Media ==
=== Radio drama ===
Prior to the television broadcasting, a radio drama series which takes place before the events of the film was broadcast on Japanese FM radio stations. These radio dramas were subsequently released on CD in December 2000 onward as part of a "Sound Cinema" series by Pioneer LDC.

1. G-Saviour Sound Cinema 01: Red Wings of Icarus
2. G-Saviour Sound Cinema 02: Before the Mission
3. G-Saviour Sound Cinema 03: Deep Sea Prometheus

=== Novelisation ===
A novelisation of the film's events was released across two volumes as part of the Shueisha D Superdash Bunko series. The novelisation was released in Japan during December 2000 and was written by Yoshie Kawahara with illustrations by Masahisa Suzuki.

=== Video game ===
Sunrise Interactive published the G-Saviour video game, which was an action game developed by Atelier Sai, for the PlayStation 2 on September 14, 2000. The game's story takes place after the events of the film with new characters continuing the overall story arc from the movie as well as featuring Mobile Suits that are exclusive to the game. This game was the first Gundam game released for the PlayStation 2.

A three part manga was serialised in Famitsu which elaborated upon the story during the first two stages of the game. This manga has not subsequently been collected in any compilation volume.

=== Music ===
G-Saviour Original Soundtrack

Soundtrack album by Various
- Released: January 24, 2001
- Genre: Orchestral
- Length: 1:14:44
- Label: JVC Victor
- Producer: Sotsu Agency

No.	Title	Music	Length
1.	"G-Saviour Theme"	Ikihiro	2:37
2.	"Main Theme"	John Debney and Louis Febre	3:50
3.	"Rescue"	John Debney and Louis Febre	5:35
4.	"Invader"	John Debney and Louis Febre	4:56
5.	"Bio-Luminescence"	John Debney and Louis Febre	5:23
6.	"Flight"	John Debney and Louis Febre	3:11
7.	"Escape"	John Debney and Louis Febre	4:29
8.	"Illuminati"	John Debney and Louis Febre	3:11
9.	"G-Saviour"	John Debney and Louis Febre	1:10
10.	"Wounded Heart"	John Debney and Louis Febre	6:17
11.	"Romance"	John Debney and Louis Febre	1:27
12.	"Misfire"	John Debney and Louis Febre	2:54
13.	"MS Battle"	John Debney and Louis Febre	6:36
14.	"G-Saviour Advance"	John Debney and Louis Febre	10:57
15.	"Declaration of Independence"	John Debney and Louis Febre	2:33
16.	"To Earth"		1:57
17.	"New History"	John Debney and Louis Febre	3:06
18.	"Orb"	Emily	4:25
Total length:			1:14:44

== Reception ==
G-Saviour has received a mixed reception. An Anime News Network review calls the film "a pleasing mix of both science fiction and adventure" while MAHQ, a dedicated mecha website, was critical of the "extremely clichéd Hollywood-style writing". Criticism has been levelled at the application of the titular mobile suits during the film, with one review stating "while the CGI effects look great, most familiar with the anime series on which this was based will complain the 'suits' were not utilized as well as they might have been".

Preceded by Turn A Gundam	Gundam metaseries (production order); 1999	Succeeded by Mobile Suit Gundam SEED
Preceded by Mobile Suit Victory Gundam	Gundam Universal Century timeline U.C. 0223	Succeeded by N/A
