= Preggoland =

2014 Canadian comedy film

- Theatrical release poster (USA)
- Directed by: Jacob Tierney
- Written by: Sonja Bennett
- Produced by: Kevin Eastwood; Dylan Collingwood
- Starring: Sonja Bennett; James Caan; Danny Trejo; Paul Campbell; Laura Harris
- Cinematography: Steve Cosens
- Edited by: Brendan Woollard
- Music by: James Jandrisch
- Production companies: Optic Nerve Films; Titlecard Pictures
- Distributed by: Mongrel Media (Canada); Gravitas (United States)
- Release date: 5 September 2014 (TIFF)
- Running time: 106 minutes
- Country: Canada
- Language: English

Preggoland is a 2014 Canadian comedy film directed by Jacob Tierney and written by Sonja Bennett. The film stars Bennett as Ruth, a 35-year-old single woman who falsely claims to be pregnant to deflect her friends' and family's mounting disapproval of her directionless, irresponsible lifestyle.

The film's cast also includes James Caan, Danny Trejo, Paul Campbell, Laura Harris, Jared Keeso, Lisa Durupt, Carrie Ruscheinsky and Denise Jones.

The film premiered on September 5, 2014 in the Special Presentations section of the 2014 Toronto International Film Festival.

== Plot ==
Ruth Huxley is a 35-year-old unmarried woman who still lives with her father and works as a checkout clerk at a local grocery store. While her high school friends have married and started families, Ruth remains stuck in an irresponsible, party-going lifestyle. After arriving hungover to a baby shower thrown by her friend Shannon and causing a disruptive scene — swinging wildly at a piñata and accidentally injuring a child — she is cut off by her friend group.

As an apology, Ruth buys the new mother an expensive stroller; pushing it through a park leads passersby to mistake her for pregnant, and the misunderstanding spreads after her hangover symptoms are separately mistaken for morning sickness at work. Rather than correct the assumption, Ruth lets it stand to keep her job, and the lie quickly brings unexpected benefits: her estranged friends welcome her back, and her father is overjoyed at the prospect of becoming a grandfather.

Her sister Hillary, who is herself trying to conceive, grows jealous of the attention Ruth begins to receive.

To sustain the deception, Ruth enlists the help of the grocery store's janitor, Pedro, a former physician unable to practice in North America, who arranges for his wife to make her a prosthetic belly in exchange for Ruth's help at work. As people pay closer attention to her, Ruth discovers an unexpected interest in her job, drawing the notice of her boss, Danny Makerman, a secretly lonely man who has always wanted a family of his own. Ruth begins to reciprocate his affection even as her guilt over the lie deepens.

Ruth plans to come clean, but when her father suffers a heart attack and tells her that the promise of a grandchild is the only thing keeping him going, she decides to continue the ruse rather than risk his health. The deception eventually unravels at a baby shower held in her honour, where her prosthetic belly, filled with red gelatin standing in for amniotic fluid, ruptures in front of her assembled friends and family, publicly exposing the fraud.

In the aftermath, Ruth comes to terms with the consequences of her lie. The film closes with her leaving her father's basement and beginning an honest relationship with Danny.

== Cast ==
- Sonja Bennett as Ruth Huxley
- James Caan as Walter Huxley
- Laura Harris as Shannon
- Carrie Ruscheinsky as Deb
- Denise Jones as Cherry
- Danny Trejo as Pedro
- Paul Campbell as Danny Makerman
- Lisa Durupt as Hillary
- Jared Keeso as Dr. Ted
- Jade Loring as Libby
- Olive Collingwood as Madison
- Chance Hurstfield as Oliver
- Brittney Wilson as Tina
- Jessica McLeod as Liz

== Development ==
Bennett conceived the idea for Preggoland while pregnant with her first child, her son. By the time production began, she had a ten-month-old and a three-year-old; she has described being in every scene of the film while also handling rewrites, and recalled expressing breast milk in her trailer between takes while conversing with co-star James Caan.

== Release ==
The film had its world premiere on September 5, 2014 in the Special Presentations section at the 2014 Toronto International Film Festival. The film also screened at the Vancouver International Film Festival, Cinéfest Sudbury International Film Festival and Calgary International Film Festival.

The film had its US premiere on January 28, 2015 at the Santa Barbara International Film Festival.

The film's Canadian distribution rights were acquired by Mongrel Media, who would handle the film's theatrical release in Canada in spring 2015. Following the film's premiere at the 2014 Toronto International Film Festival, Lightning Entertainment acquired the film's international distribution rights.

== Critical response ==
On review aggregation website Rotten Tomatoes, 47% of 19 critics' reviews are positive, with an average rating of 5.3/10. Metacritic, which uses a weighted average, has given the film a score of 45 out of 100, based on 5 critics, indicating "mixed or average reviews".

== Awards ==
The film was nominated for Best Canadian Feature Film and won the Most Popular Canadian Film Award at the 2014 Vancouver International Film Festival. At the festival's closing gala, Bennett remarked that the film's premise mirrored her own life, noting that she and her husband, actor Stephen Lobo, had two children by that point. In January 2015, the film was nominated for Best British Columbia Film at the Vancouver Film Critics Circle Awards. In March 2015 the film won the Best Screenplay Award at the Fargo Film Festival and won the Audience Choice Award for Best Feature at the Omaha Film Festival.
