= Chronicle Mysteries =

- Genre: Mystery
- Written by: Melissa Salmons; Kraig Wenman
- Directed by: Jason Bourque; Terry Ingram; David Weaver; Nimisha Mukerji
- Starring: Alison Sweeney; Benjamin Ayres
- Original language: English
- No. of episodes: 5

Original release
- Network: Hallmark Movies & Mysteries
- Release: February 17, 2019 – February 21, 2021

Chronicle Mysteries is a 2019 American/Canadian mystery film series that stars Alison Sweeney as Alex McPherson, a podcast host, and Benjamin Ayres as Drew Godfrey, the editor of a local newspaper. Set in the small Pennsylvania town of Harrington, it airs on Hallmark Movies & Mysteries in the United States.

== Main cast ==
- Alison Sweeney as Alexandra "Alex" McPherson, a podcast host who moves to her hometown and stays to manage the local newspaper, The Chronicle which is owned by her uncle
- Benjamin Ayres as Andrew "Drew" Godfrey, a single father who works as the editor-in-chief at The Chronicle newspaper
- Michael Kopsa as Miles Lewiston, the publisher and owner of The Chronicle and Alex's uncle
- Rebecca Staab as Eileen Bruce, a lifestyle journalist at the newspaper
- Olivia Steele Falconer as Kendall Godfrey, Drew's teenage daughter who interns with the newspaper
- Dave Collette as Charlie "Chuck" Matthews, printing press manager at the newspaper
- Toby Levins as Sean Mullen, a local fireman who becomes interested in Alex
- Jesse Moss as Tim Reynolds
- Ian Collins as Zachary "Zach" Warren, Chuck's Nephew
- Karen Holiness as Katie

== Characters ==
- A dark grey cell indicates the character was not in the film.

Character	Title				
Character	Recovered	The Wrong Man	Vines that Bind	The Deep End	Helped to Death
Alex McPherson	Alison Sweeney	Alison Sweeney	Alison Sweeney	Alison Sweeney	Alison Sweeney
Drew Godfrey	Benjamin Ayres	Benjamin Ayres	Benjamin Ayres	Benjamin Ayres	Benjamin Ayres
Miles Lewiston	Michael Kopsa	Michael Kopsa	Michael Kopsa		
Eileen Bruce	Rebecca Staab		Rebecca Staab	Rebecca Staab	Rebecca Staab
Kendall Godfrey	Olivia Steele Falconer		Olivia Steele Falconer	Olivia Steele Falconer	Olivia Steele Falconer
Chuck Matthews	Dave Collette	Dave Collette	Dave Collette		
Sean Mullen	Toby Levins	Toby Levins	Toby Levins		

== Films ==
No.	Title	Directed by	Written by	Original release date
1	"Chronicle Mysteries: Recovered"	Jason Bourque	Melissa Salmons	February 17, 2019
Alex McPherson is the host of a podcast who returns to her hometown of Harrington in Pennsylvania seeking answers to the disappearance of her school friend, Gina DeSavio (Lisa Durupt), who went missing twenty years ago in 1998. She teams up with the local newspaper, The Chronicle, to research the case from old case files and interviews with locals to try and find out what happened to Gina. She and newspaper editor-in-chief, Drew, have different outlooks on research and using technology but end up working together and striking a friendship.
2	"Chronicle Mysteries: The Wrong Man"	Terry Ingram	Melissa Salmons	February 24, 2019
The body of a woman who had been missing for three years is discovered. Her husband, acquitted for lack of evidence but now seen as guilty, asks Alex for help to clear his name. As she investigates for her podcast, Drew investigates fishy river shipping for a local scoop.
3	"Chronicle Mysteries: Vines that Bind"	David Weaver	Melissa Salmons, Kraig Wenman	March 3, 2019
Alex's friend and colleague at the newspaper, Eileen, enlists her help to look into the one year old, suspicious death of the owner of a vineyard. After his death by carbon dioxide poisoning, Colton Saunier's will divided the vineyard between his sons - Jackson and Gil but the discovery of a mysterious new will now leaves everything to only one son leading to new suspicious events as Alex, Drew and Eileen investigate.
4	"Chronicle Mysteries: The Deep End"	Nimisha Mukerji	Melissa Salmons	August 25, 2019
Alex's best friend Katie (Karen Holness) is the defense attorney for Stephanie Burke (Chelan Simmons), a young mother of two who is on trial for the murder of her ex-husband Eliot. Katie asks Alex to help and Alex and the team at the newspaper decide to investigate. Drew and Alex work closely and discover Eliot had many secrets including being a pilot and owning his own plane. As they dig deeper they find that Eliot could have had friends and enemies that they don't know about.
5	"Chronicle Mysteries: Helped to Death"	Jason Bourque	Melissa Salmons	February 21, 2021
Alex and Drew investigate a self help retreat and the controversial life coach who oversees it.

== Production and filming ==
The first three films were shot in Vancouver, Canada.
