= Carrot Cake Murder: A Hannah Swensen Mystery =

2008 novel by Joanne Fluke

- Author: Joanne Fluke
- Genre: Cosy mystery
- Publication date: 2021
- Preceded by: Candy Cane Murder (2007)
- Followed by: Cream Puff Murder (2009)

Carrot Cake Murder: A Hannah Swensen Mystery is the 10th book in the Hannah Swenson Mysteries series by Joanne Fluke.

== Plot summary ==
It is summer in Lake Eden, Minnesota and everyone is very excited with the family reunion that Hannah's partner Lisa has prepared coming up shortly. Lisa's Uncle Gus has made an unexpected return after a 30-year absence with expensive jewelry, clothes and a new car. Uncle Gus is immediately the center of attention at the reunion with no doubt. It is up to Hannah Swensen, the owner of The Cookie Jar bakery, to provide the treats. Hannah bakes one of her specialties, her carrot cake which is a big hit. Gus is impressed with Hannah's cake and asks her for another platter, but the next day as the pictures for the family reunion are being taken, everyone notices that there is one person missing. As Hannah goes out to search for Gus, she finds him over by the bar at the pavilion with two pieces of Hannah's carrot cake by his side, dead stabbed with an ice pick! It is up to Hannah to solve the mystery of the murder. It seems like Grandpa Jack might be blamed for killing Gus because of his Alzheimer's. Hannah thinks that he is not responsible for the murder, so she tries to prove that he is innocent. The book also has recipes.

== Reception ==
A Book Reporter review says, "CARROT CAKE MURDER is every bit as fun and entertaining as the previous nine Hannah Swensen mysteries. It’s almost like having your own family reunion when you get to catch up on what’s going on in Hannah’s life and visit with her mother, two sisters and close friends. There is just something so inviting about the town of Lake Eden and its residents that you’ll want to pull up a chair and sit a spell!" A Mystery Reader review says, "There are a lot of worthy suspects of the murder of Uncle Gus, but the true murderer is obvious and readers will find themselves wondering what is taking Hannah and the Lake Eden police so long to find the person. There are over twenty new recipes for cookies and some savory recipes for large gatherings. Culinary mystery fans will be satisfied with this latest entry." It was reviewed by Booklist. It was reviewed by Publishers Weekly
