= Ian Moore (author) =

English comedian and author

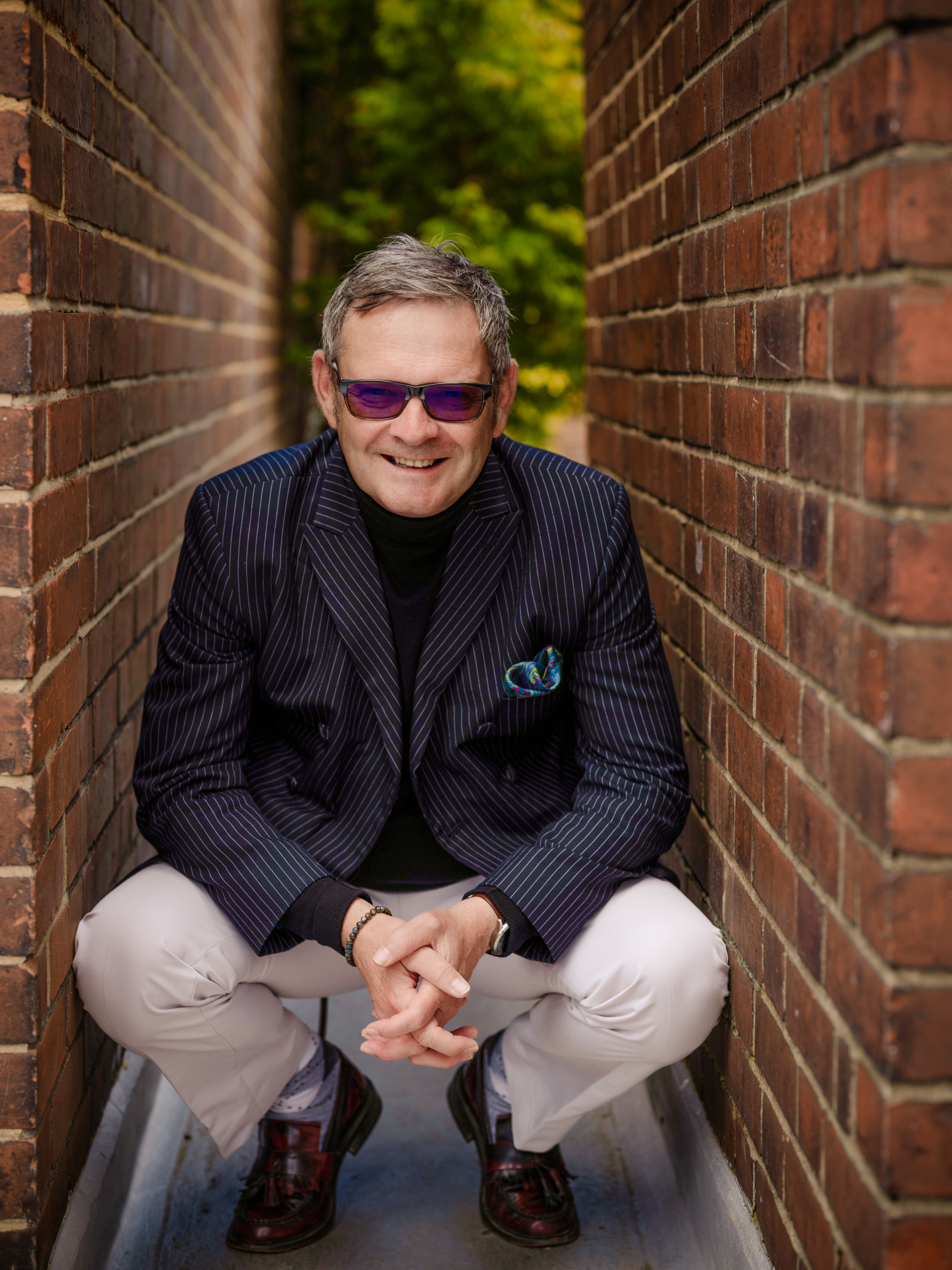
Ian Moore

Ian Moore is a comedian, TV and radio performer and author of the Follet Valley mystery series and the Juge Lombard crime novels.

His first book, Death and Croissants, came out in 2021 and became a 'Times' bestseller, has been translated into a dozen languages and been optioned for television. His second in the series, Death and Fromage, was nominated for The Lilian Jackson Braun Memorial Award at the Mystery Writers of America Edgar Awards in 2025.

In 2025, Moore contributed to Jeeves Again: Twelve New Stories, a collection of short stories celebrating and inspired by the iconic characters of P.G. Wodehouse.

He has also written books about his life in rural France.

== Bibliography ==
=== The Follet Valley series ===
- 2021: Death and Croissants, Farrago ISBN 978-1-78842-357-1
- 2022: Death and Fromage, Farrago ISBN 978-1-78842-383-0
- 2022: Death and Papa Noël, Farrago ISBN 978-1-78842-425-7
- 2023: Death at the Chateau, Farrago ISBN 978-1-78842-406-6
- 2024: Death in the Jardin, Farrago ISBN 978-1-78842-499-8
- 2025: Death and Boules, Farrago ISBN 978-1-78842-515-5
- 2026: Death and Déjà Vu, Farrago ISBN 978-1-78842-597-1

=== The Juge Lombard series ===
- 2024: The Man Who Didn't Burn, Duckworth Books ISBN 978-1-78842-507-0
- 2025: Dead Behind the Eyes, Duckworth Books ISBN 978-0-7156-5595-5
- 2026: The Cry of the Immortals, Duckwork Books ISBN 978-0-7156-5596-2

=== Memoirs ===
- 2024: Vive le Chaos: My So-Called Tranquil Family Life in Rural France, Summersdale ISBN 978-1-83799-450-2
- 2025: C'est la Vie: Adventures of an English Grump in Rural France, Summersdale ISBN 978-1-83799-614-8

=== Short Stories ===
- 2025: Jeeves Again: Twelve New Stories, Penguin ISBN 978-1-80495-025-8

== Comedy career ==
Moore worked as a standup comedian for over 30 years, regularly headlining at London's Comedy Store and many other comedy clubs around the world.

Following a sell-out run alongside Catherine Tate, Moore was selected to appear at Montreal’s Just for Laughs comedy festival. Alongside the likes of Jimmy Carr and Lee Mack, Ian performed in the sellout Britcom showcase and the Worldcom show at the festival’s finale.

Moore has appeared on TV and radio, including Richard Osman's House of Games, The Comedy Store on Comedy Central, The Now Show on BBC Radio 4 and Fighting Talk on BBC 5Live.

He is also a frequent corporate host/after dinner speaker.

== Personal life ==
Moore lives in the Loire Valley in France with his family.
