= Garage Sale Mystery =

American/Canadian mystery film series

- Genre: Mystery film
- Written by: Walter Klenhard; Kraig X. Wenman; Patrick Kevin Day; Andrew Hanson; John Whelpley; Teena Booth
- Directed by: Peter DeLuise; Norma Bailey; Kristoffer Tabori; Neill Fearnley; Mel Damski; Paula Elle
- Starring: Lori Loughlin
- Countries of origin: United States; Canada
- Original language: English
- No. of episodes: 17

Production
- Executive producers: Lori Loughlin; Harvey Kahn; Allan Ett; Peter DeLuise; Michael Shepard
- Producer: Harvey Kahn
- Running time: 83–88 minutes

Original release
- Network: Hallmark Channel
- Release: September 14, 2013
- Network: Hallmark Mystery
- Release: October 26, 2014 – October 19, 2022
- Network: Hallmark Channel
- Release: September 19, 2026

Garage Sale Mysteries (formerly branded as Garage Sale Mystery until 2018) is a mystery film series starring Lori Loughlin as Jennifer Shannon. It is based on the Garage Sale Mystery book series written by Suzi Weinert. The Hallmark series airs on Hallmark Mystery in the US, Bravo in Canada, and Channel 5 in the UK occasionally as part of the weekday films. Sixteen total films aired from the 2013 pilot film, until the series was cancelled in 2019 after Loughlin was fired from Hallmark. In June 2026 the series was renewed by Hallmark, with a new film in the series set to release on September 19, 2026.

The author of the book series, Suzi Weinert, created the story and characters based on her experiences living in the DC suburbs, where she attended sales given by politicians, CEO’s, diplomats, military elite, and other influential homeowners in this upscale, transient area. She discovered that valuable merchandise often came with unexpected stories, leading to her Garage Sale Mystery series. Her books span ripped-from-the-headlines topics like terrorism and elder care. The wife of a retired Army general, Weinert lives in northern Virginia near most of her five children and their growing families. Weinert is a member of Mystery Writers of America and Sisters in Crime.

The Hallmark series based on Weinert's work was executive produced by Loughlin, Michael Shepard, and Peter DeLuise, who are also executive producers on the Hallmark television series When Calls the Heart. The series follows the story of an antique dealer, Jennifer Shannon, who has a knack for finding murders. Her eye for details leads her to help solve these murders, even if it means putting her life in danger. Weinert made a cameo in the first Hallmark Garage Sale Mysteries movie.

== Cast ==
- Lori Loughlin as Jennifer Shannon, series protagonist who runs an antiques shop called Rags to Riches
- Steve Bacic as Jason Shannon, Jennifer's engineer husband (Rick Ravanello played the role in the first film)
- Sarah Strange as Danielle "Dani", Jennifer's business partner and co-owner of Rags to Riches
- Eva Bourne as Hannah Shannon, Jennifer and Jason's daughter (Sara Canning played the role in the first film)
- Connor Stanhope as Logan Shannon, Jennifer and Jason's son (Played by Brendan Meyer in the first four films)
- Kevin O'Grady as Detective Frank Lynwood, a friend of Jennifer

== Characters ==
- A dark grey cell indicates the character was not in the film.

Character	Title																
Character	Garage Sale Mystery	All That Glitters	The Deadly Room	The Wedding Dress	Guilty Until Proven Innocent	The Novel Murders	The Art of Murder	The Beach Murder	Murder by Text	Murder Most Medieval	A Case of Murder	The Pandora's Box Murders	The Mask Murder	Picture a Murder	Murder in D Minor	Searched & Seized	Murder Takes the Stage
Jennifer Shannon	Lori Loughlin	Lori Loughlin	Lori Loughlin	Lori Loughlin	Lori Loughlin	Lori Loughlin	Lori Loughlin	Lori Loughlin	Lori Loughlin	Lori Loughlin	Lori Loughlin	Lori Loughlin	Lori Loughlin	Lori Loughlin	Lori Loughlin	Lori Loughlin	Lori Loughlin
Jason Shannon	Rick Ravanello	Steve Bacic	Steve Bacic	Steve Bacic	Steve Bacic	Steve Bacic	Steve Bacic	Steve Bacic	Steve Bacic	Steve Bacic	Steve Bacic	Steve Bacic	Steve Bacic	Steve Bacic	Steve Bacic	Steve Bacic	Steve Bacic
Danielle "Dani"	Sarah Strange	Sarah Strange	Sarah Strange	Sarah Strange	Sarah Strange	Sarah Strange	Sarah Strange	Sarah Strange	Sarah Strange	Sarah Strange	Sarah Strange	Sarah Strange	Sarah Strange	Sarah Strange	Sarah Strange	Sarah Strange	Sarah Strange
Hannah Shannon	Sara Canning		Eva Bourne	Eva Bourne	Eva Bourne	Eva Bourne	Eva Bourne	Eva Bourne	Eva Bourne	Eva Bourne	Eva Bourne	Eva Bourne	Eva Bourne	Eva Bourne	Eva Bourne	Eva Bourne	Eva Bourne
Logan Shannon	Brendan Meyer	Brendan Meyer	Brendan Meyer	Brendan Meyer	Connor Stanhope	Connor Stanhope	Connor Stanhope	Connor Stanhope	Connor Stanhope	Connor Stanhope	Connor Stanhope	Connor Stanhope	Connor Stanhope	Connor Stanhope	Connor Stanhope	Connor Stanhope	Connor Stanhope
Detective Frank Lynwood		Kevin O'Grady	Kevin O'Grady	Kevin O'Grady	Kevin O'Grady	Kevin O'Grady	Kevin O'Grady	Kevin O'Grady	Kevin O'Grady	Kevin O'Grady	Kevin O'Grady	Kevin O'Grady	Kevin O'Grady	Kevin O'Grady	Kevin O'Grady	Kevin O'Grady	Kevin O'Grady
Trammell			Jay Brazeau	Jay Brazeau	Jay Brazeau		Jay Brazeau	Jay Brazeau	Jay Brazeau	Jay Brazeau	Jay Brazeau	Jay Brazeau	Jay Brazeau	Jay Brazeau	Jay Brazeau	Jay Brazeau	
Sally Lynnwood		Johannah Newmarch	Johannah Newmarch		Johannah Newmarch						Johannah Newmarch	Johannah Newmarch		Johannah Newmarch			

== Films ==
No.	Title	Directed by	Written by	Original release date
1	"Garage Sale Mystery"	Peter DeLuise	Suzi Weinert (book), Walter Klenhard (teleplay)	September 14, 2013
Jennifer notices that several rich houses are robbed right after they have garage sales, including one woman who ends up dead, apparently from accidentally falling down the stairs, but Jennifer suspects foul play. She convinces Detective Adam Iverson to accompany her to some garage sales, and they do turn up some suspects for the robberies, but no evidence emerges for the murder. Jennifer eventually finds the murderer.
2	"Garage Sale Mystery: All That Glitters"	Peter DeLuise	Suzi Weinert (book), Walter Klenhard (teleplay)	October 26, 2014
Jennifer Shannon has a gift for finding rare treasures hidden in garage sales that she can resell at her consignment store, Rags to Riches. When Jennifer's friend and self-storage facility owner Martin (Michael Kopsa) turns up murdered just hours after auctioning off an abandoned storage unit full of unique items, she is immediately pulled into the investigation as a key eyewitness. Working with Detective Lynwood, Jennifer helps single out a disgruntled customer as the prime suspect, while she and her business partner, Danielle, sift through boxes from the auction. As her husband Jason worries about her safety, there is a break-in at her store and a run-in with Martin's angry widow. Then, Jennifer and Danielle discover their new merchandise contains the sparkly evidence they needed all along to nail the surprising real culprit, and they must race to save a life and put their own on the line.
3	"Garage Sale Mystery: The Deadly Room"	Peter DeLuise	Suzi Weinert (book), Walter Klenhard (teleplay)	April 28, 2015
A real estate agent sleeps all night in one of her listings to prove that it is not cursed but ends up dead.
4	"Garage Sale Mystery: The Wedding Dress"	Peter DeLuise	Suzi Weinert (book), Walter Klenhard (teleplay)	August 9, 2015
Jennifer finds an old but expensive wedding dress in a box of clothes purchased at an estate sale. She finds a blood stain on a pocket and investigation turns up Helen Carter, the bride, together with the story that the groom disappeared between the wedding and the reception after the wedding. Jennifer doggedly pursues the mystery and, using luminol, determines that there were still blood stains inside a closet in the storage room of the church. She persuades Ted to confess to murder, but then Helen confesses her role in the murder. Helen's actions are ruled justified and she is not charged. Helen and Ted renew their romance after a gap of 35 years.
5	"Garage Sale Mystery: Guilty Until Proven Innocent"	Peter DeLuise	Suzi Weinert (book), Walter Klenhard (teleplay)	January 3, 2016
Sandra (Kirsten Robek), a former friend of Jennifer's, comes to Rags to Riches offering to sell all of her antiques from her store Past Perfect asking for no payment up front and only 20% of any sale Jennifer makes. At Sandra's House in a Barn for storing extra antiques in Madison, Jennifer discovers a basement filled with beautiful antiques, and they find the body of Sandra's former fiancé, Michael Chambers (Frank Zotter), whom Sandra thought had left her for another woman when he had disappeared two years ago. An investigation ensues under local Sheriff Conners (Panou). Jennifer must find out the truth to prove Sandra's innocence. Then she meets recently widowed Kimberly Colette Baumaine (Aliyah O'Brien) who comes to Jennifer's store to sell her late husband's antiques and the pieces begin to fall into place.
6	"Garage Sale Mystery: The Novel Murders"	Norma Bailey	Suzi Weinert (book), Walter Klenhard (teleplay)	June 5, 2016
There is a series of murders, each one taken out of a mystery novel. First, Art Henley (John Innes) is murdered, following the Agatha Christie crime novel Three Act Tragedy. Second, Gerry McNally (Alex Zahara) is murdered, following Arthur Conan Doyle's Sherlock Holmes novel, A Study in Scarlet. Third, Myles Fowler (Gerard Plunkett) is murdered, loosely following the mystery novel The Circular Staircase.
7	"Garage Sale Mystery: The Art of Murder"	Kristoffer Tabori	Suzi Weinert (book), Walter Klenhard (teleplay)	January 8, 2017
While setting up a charity garage sale, Jennifer Shannon discovers a body in the attic of a nearby home. Using her eye for detail as well as her experience with antiques and murder, Jennifer puts together clues that help catch a killer.
8	"Garage Sale Mystery: The Beach Murder"	Neill Fearnley	Suzi Weinert (book), Walter Klenhard (teleplay)	August 11, 2017
Jennifer's friend and customer Anne's (Chiara Zanni) husband is found dead at an isolated beach and his death is suspected to be an accidental drowning. But Anne suspects foul play convinced that her avid surfer husband Steve was murdered. Steve's brother Todd (Ben Cotton) is a prime suspect when Steve's business partner Mitch (Michael Teigen) is also attacked but he is soon found dead deepening the mystery. A local surfer with a criminal past had vandalized Steve's car and is soon arrested. With the clues still not adding up, Jennifer works with Detective Lynwood to uncover the truth. Meanwhile, a smitten Logan decides to try his hand at theater to be cast opposite his crush. Jennifer and Dani try to reconcile a married couple who try selling each other's memorabilia to the store.
9	"Garage Sale Mystery: Murder by Text"	Neill Fearnley	Suzi Weinert (book), Walter Klenhard (teleplay)	August 13, 2017
A bass player named Lita is found dead by hanging, right before a planned tour with a big country singer. Also, Dani's older sister Beth Ann comes to Town to Visit her.
10	"Garage Sale Mystery: Murder Most Medieval"	Neill Fearnley	Suzi Weinert (book), Walter Klenhard (teleplay)	August 20, 2017
Jenn finds the body of a local college history professor hidden in a suit of armor she purchased. After the professor's teaching assistant becomes the next victim, Jennifer finds herself caught in a killer's web of dangerous lies.
11	"Garage Sale Mystery: A Case of Murder"	Neill Fearnley	Suzi Weinert (book), Kraig X. Wenman (teleplay)	August 27, 2017
After buying an old reel-to-reel recorder at a garage sale, Jenn discovers that it includes the sound of a man pleading for his life. An audio repair shop leads her to find the owner Dr. Vedders only he has died of stab wounds. The devoted psychologist worked with a group of patients at a local community center and had retired the day he was later murdered. An unhappy wife and a group of abandoned patients make for a long list of suspects. But, when Jenn locates Kendahl Hartman at Eagle Rock's Campground around 1 Week after Dr. Vedders death then Kendahl is found dead not too long after Jenn found her at Eagle Rock's Campground. Jenn and Detective Lynwood must find the killer before Jenn's life is in danger.
12	"Garage Sale Mysteries: The Pandora's Box Murders"	Neill Fearnley	Suzi Weinert (book), Kraig X. Wenman (teleplay)	August 5, 2018
Jennifer comes in contact with a mysterious puzzle box that belonged to the Andronicus family, real estate developers whose latest project is unpopular with the townsfolk. The box goes missing, and some of the Andronicus family mysteriously die just days apart. Her curiosity piqued, Jennifer embarks on her own unorthodox investigation of the murders.
13	"Garage Sale Mysteries: The Mask Murder"	Mel Damski	Suzi Weinert (book), Kraig X. Wenman (teleplay)	August 12, 2018
When Jennifer buys a storage locker at auction, she discovers a dead body inside, along with a mask matching the deceased woman.
14	"Garage Sale Mysteries: Picture a Murder"	Neill Fearnley	Suzi Weinert (book), Patrick Kevin Day & Andrew Hanson (teleplay)	August 19, 2018
Jenn gets the photos in an antique camera from the estate of a recently deceased and seemingly wealthy photography enthusiast printed. One of the pictures leads her to believe that the man's death was anything but accidental.
15	"Garage Sale Mysteries: Murder in D Minor"	Neill Fearnley	Suzi Weinert (book), John Whelpley (teleplay)	August 26, 2018
Jenn puts the winning bid on a vintage Welte-Mignon player piano at the estate auction of a wealthy philanthropist, but soon discovers that the late owner may have led a less-than-charitable life before being murdered.
16	"Garage Sale Mysteries: Searched & Seized"	Neill Fearnley	Suzi Weinert (book), John Whelpley (teleplay)	October 19, 2022
'Search & Seized' finds Jenn's friend Miles running a police auction that features items seized in a money counterfeiting operation. When Miles turns up dead, Jenn suspects he may have gotten involved with criminals to solve his debt problems.
17	"Garage Sale Mysteries: Murder Takes the Stage"	Paula Elle	Suzi Weinert (book), Teena Booth (teleplay)	September 19, 2026
One of the members of Jennifer Shannon's true-crime book club is murdered during the group's reenactment of the Lizzie Borden case.

== Background ==
The series started as an adaptation of the novel Garage Sale Stalker by Suzi Weinert, although the screenplay for the first, and subsequent films, differs substantially from the novel and its sequels. The series were influenced by Agatha Christie, with several references to the famous mystery author.

== Broadcast ==
The first film in the series premiered in the USA on the Hallmark Channel, with subsequent films premiering on Hallmark Mystery. Starting in mid-2025, Hallmark began premiering its mystery movies on Hallmark Channel before moving them over to Hallmark Mystery. This protocol still is in place for the Garage Sale Mysteries series’ return on September 19, 2026, as it will debut on Hallmark Mystery on September 20, 2026.

In Canada, the films air on Bravo. In the UK, they have been broadcast on Channel 5 and in South Africa on eMovies HD.

== Cancellation and Renewal ==
On March 14, 2019, Loughlin was terminated from Hallmark due to her involvement and indictment in the 2019 college admissions bribery scandal. It was not until 2022 that Searched & Seized was released.

On June 30, 2026 it was announced that the series would return, with Loughlin returning, with a film expected to release in the fall of 2026
