= Hallmark Mystery =

American cable television network

- Country: United States
- Broadcast area: Nationwide
- Headquarters: Studio City, Los Angeles, California

Programming
- Language: English

Ownership
- Owner: Hallmark Media
- Sister channels: Hallmark Channel; Hallmark Family

History
- Launched: January 20, 2004; 22 years ago
- Former names: Hallmark Movie Channel (2004–2014); Hallmark Movies & Mysteries (2014–2024)

Links
- Website: www.hallmarkmystery.com

Availability

Streaming media
- Service(s): Frndly TV, fuboTV, Philo, Sling TV, Hulu + Live TV, YouTube TV

Hallmark Mystery (formerly known as Hallmark Movie Channel (HMC) and Hallmark Movies & Mysteries (HMM) is an American digital cable and satellite television channel owned by Hallmark Media, a subsidiary of Hallmark Cards. The channel was spun off from sister network Hallmark Channel, and airs family-oriented feature and television films along with a limited number of murder- and mystery-themed television series.

As of February 2015, Hallmark Movies & Mysteries is available to approximately 55,827,000 pay television households (48% of households with television) in the United States.

== History ==
=== Hallmark Movie Channel ===
The Hallmark Movie Channel was launched in January 2004 as an outlet for additional movies and series available to the Hallmark Channel (HC) that the station did not have the airtime to run. Two series were initially picked up, with Magnum, P.I. available at launch and Diagnosis: Murder available in January 2005. Crown Media shifted showing their Mystery Movie film series in 2008 from Hallmark Channel to this channel as they were having more success with lighter romances. On April 2, 2008, the channel was switched over to HD format.

AT&T U-verse dropped Hallmark Channel and sister channel Hallmark Movie Channel on September 1, 2010, due to a carriage dispute. As of July 23, 2015, both channels have returned to U-verse. In July 2012 during a retransmission consent dispute with Hearst Television, the network was slotted by Time Warner Cable in place of Hearst's broadcast television stations as a 'free preview' and make-good for viewers until the dispute was settled.

=== Hallmark Movies & Mysteries ===
On March 14, 2014, Crown Media Holdings announced that Hallmark Movie Channel would be rebranded as Hallmark Movies & Mysteries in October 2014. In rebranding, the company was trying to differentiate between the two channels, which feature different programming. With the new name, Hallmark reestablished a mystery wheel series under the name "Original Mystery Wheel" in 2015, having previously had one on the Hallmark Channel from 2004 to 2008.

After running several repeats of the Jesse Stone films in 2015, the channel agreed to pick up the next two films in the series from Sony Pictures Television. On Wednesday, November 11, 2015, Hallmark Movie Channel started its first "The Most Wonderful Movies of Christmas" seasonal programming.

On July 28, 2017, it was reported that Crown Media would add a brand new cable network titled Hallmark Drama (now Hallmark Family), which launched on October 1, 2017, and a subscription video on demand streaming service titled Hallmark Movies Now on October 3 of the same year.

Two new development deals along with new installments of existing movie series were announced by the channel. Al Roker signed a deal for his The Midnight Show Murders: A Billy Blessing Novel and Scandal inspiration Judy Smith, a crisis communications specialist, made a deal for the movie The Adjuster. Although The Adjuster never made it into production, in 2021, Smith was developing a new film titled Redemption in Cherry Springs.

=== Hallmark Mystery ===
On February 6, 2024, Hallmark Media announced Hallmark Movies & Mysteries would be renamed Hallmark Mystery on March 6, 2024.

== Programming ==
The channel features mystery, western, and family-friendly movies and mini-series mainly from the Hallmark Channel library, notably original films that had once premiered on Hallmark Channel at an earlier date. The channel also has featured a small number of films from Hallmark Hall of Fame, Walt Disney Pictures and Touchstone Pictures. It also broadcasts the McBride, Murder 101, Jane Doe, and Mystery Woman film series, as well as later Perry Mason and Matlock made-for-TV movies produced after the end of those series.

Hallmark Movie Channel logo, 2004–2014

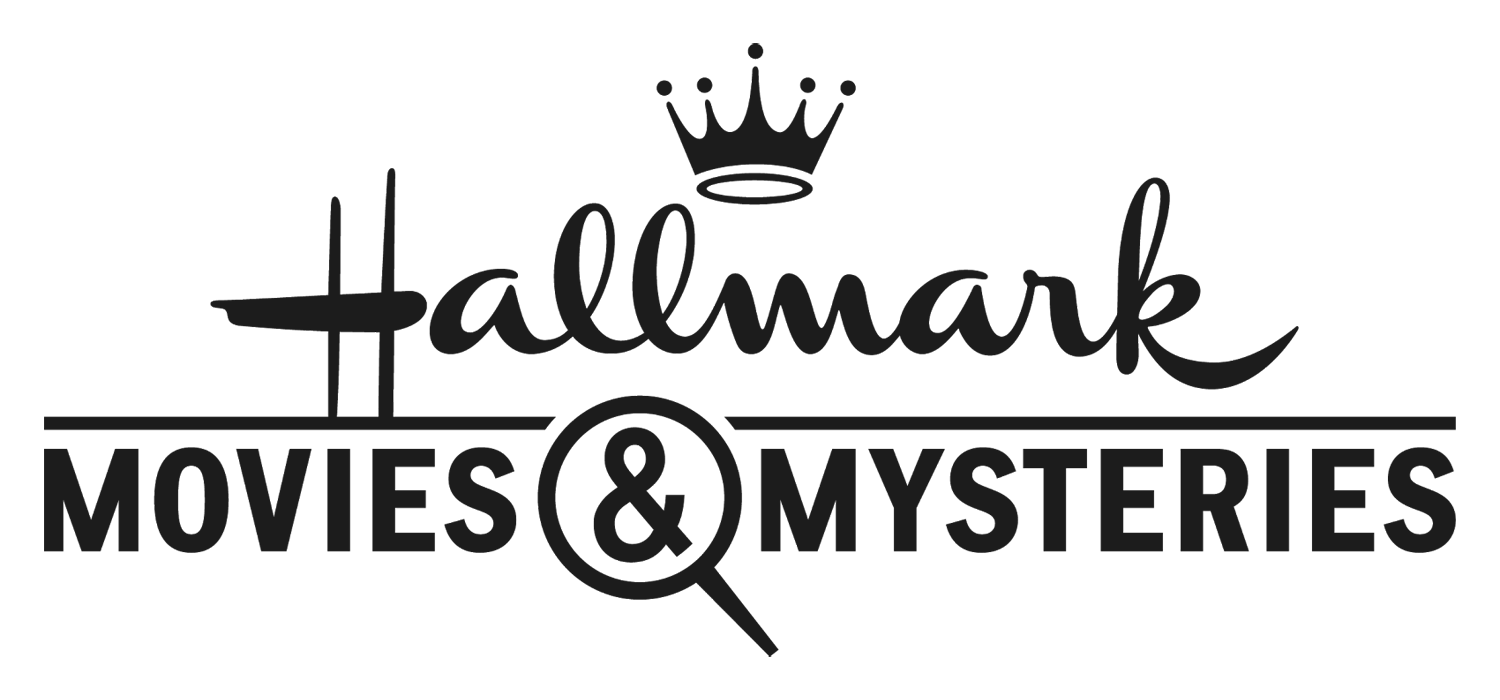
Hallmark Movies & Mysteries logo, 2014–2024

The first original movie to premiere on the channel was Son of the Dragon on April 2, 2008, this was followed by a continuous stream of original movie premieres. In July 2010, the channel began airing scripted television series to its schedule. Currently, these syndicated series mostly include mystery series and Hallmark Channel original series.

As a companion to Hallmark Channel's "Countdown to Christmas" event, the network also airs a large number of Christmas-themed films during the later months of the year, branded as "Miracles of Christmas".

=== Wheel series ===
- Mystery Wheel is a movie wheel series started in 2015 after the rebranding of the channel. The original movies series were Garage Sale Mystery, Gourmet Detective and Murder, She Baked (based on Joanne Fluke’s Hannah Swensen Mystery series).
- Signature Mystery is a movie wheel series started in 2019 featuring Aurora Teagarden Mysteries, Garage Sale Mysteries, Gourmet Detective, Morning Show Mysteries, Hailey Dean Mysteries, later expanded to include the new Chronicle Mysteries, Crossword Mysteries, Mystery 101, Martha's Vineyard Mysteries, Matchmaker Mysteries, Ruby Herring Mysteries, Darrow & Darrow, Emma Fielding Mysteries, Murder, She Baked / Hannah Swensen Mysteries, Signed, Sealed, Delivered, Flower Shop Mysteries and Picture Perfect Mysteries.

== Current programming ==
- Aurora Teagarden Mysteries
- Columbo
- Crossword Mysteries
- Diagnosis: Murder
- Emma Fielding Mysteries
- Gourmet Detective
- Matlock
- Monk
- Murder, She Wrote
- Psych
- Signed, Sealed, Delivered

=== Former programming ===
- Drop Dead Diva
- Hart to Hart
- Magnum, P.I.
- Scandal

== Hallmark original mystery movies ==
=== Current series ===
- Curious Caterer (2022–)
  - Dying for Chocolate (2022)
  - Grilling Season (2023)
  - Fatal Vows (2023)
  - Foiled Plans (2024)
  - Forbidden Fruit (2024)
- Haunted Harmony Mysteries (2023–)
  - Haunted Harmony Mysteries: Murder in G Major (2023)
  - Haunted Harmony Mysteries: Buried at C (2025)
  - Haunted Harmony Mysteries: Key to the Castle (2026)
  - Haunted Harmony Mysteries: Prelude to a Wedding (2026)
- The Jane Mysteries (2023–)
  - Inheritance Lost (2023)
  - A Deadly Prescription (2024)
  - Death at Moseby (2024)
  - Too Much to Lose (2024)
- The Cases of Mystery Lane (2023–)
  - The Cases of Mystery Lane (2023)
  - Death is Listening (2024)
- Mystery Island (2023–)
  - Mystery Island (2023)
  - Winner Takes All (2025)
  - Play for Keeps (2025)
  - House Rules (2025)
- Nelly Knows Mysteries (2024–)
  - A Fatal Engagement (2024)
  - All Manners of Murder (2026)

=== Former series ===
- Aurora Teagarden Mysteries (2015–2023; moved to Hallmark+)
- Chronicle Mysteries (2019–2021)
- Crossword Mysteries (2019–2021)
  - A Puzzle to Die For (2019)
  - Proposing Murder (2019)
  - Abracadaver (2020)
  - Terminal Descent (2021)
  - Riddle Me Dead (2021)
- Darrow & Darrow (2017–2019)
- Emma Fielding Mysteries (2017–2019)
  - Site Unseen (2017)
  - Past Malice (2018)
  - More Bitter than Death (2019)
- Fixer Upper Mysteries (2017–2018)
- Flower Shop Mysteries (2016)
- Garage Sale Mysteries (2013–2022; moved to Hallmark Channel)
- Gourmet Detective (2015–2020)
- Hailey Dean Mysteries (2016–2019)
- Jane Doe (2005–2008)
- Martha's Vineyard Mysteries (2020–2021)
- Matchmaker Mysteries (2019–2021)
  - A Killer Engagement (2019)
  - A Fatal Romance (2020)
  - The Art of the Kill (2021)
- Morning Show Mysteries (2018–2021)
- Mystery 101 (2019–2021)
- Mystery Woman (2003–2007)
- Signed, Sealed, Delivered (2013–2024; moved to Hallmark Channel)
- Picture Perfect Mysteries (2019–2020)
  - Newlywed and Dead (2019)
  - Dead Over Diamonds (2020)
  - Exit Stage Death (2020)
- Murder, She Baked / Hannah Swensen Mysteries (2015–2017, 2021–2025; moved to Hallmark Channel)
- Ruby Herring Mysteries (2019–2020)
  - Silent Witness (2019)
  - Her Last Breath (2019)
  - Prediction Murder (2020)

=== Standalone movies ===
- Dear Prudence (2008)
- Deck the Halls (2011)
- The Mystery Cruise (2013)
- After All These Years (2013)
- Along Came a Nanny (2014)
- Wedding Planner Mystery (2014)
- Mary Higgins Clark's My Gal Sunday (2014)
- Sandra Brown's White Hot (2016)
- An Uncommon Grace (2017)
- To Catch a Spy (2021)
- Redemption in Cherry Springs (2021)
- Cut, Color, Murder (2022)
- Francesca Quinn, PI (2022)
- Nikki & Nora: Sister Sleuths (2022)
- Family History Mysteries: Buried Past (2023)
- The Dancing Detective: A Deadly Tango (2023)
- Crimes of Fashion: Killer Clutch (2024)
- Tipline Mysteries: Dial 1 for Murder (2024)
- CrimeTime: Freefall (2024)
- Family Practice Mysteries: Coming Home (2024)
- True Justice: Family Ties (2024)
- Jazz Ramsey: A K-9 Mystery (2024)
- Gilded Newport Mysteries: Murder at the Breakers (2024)

=== Seasonal programming ===
- "Miracles of Christmas", originally "The Most Wonderful Movies of Christmas" and later "The Most Wonderful Miracles of Christmas": On November 11, 2013, Hallmark Movie Channel started its first "The Most Wonderful Movies of Christmas" seasonal programming duplicating the main Hallmark Channel's "Countdown to Christmas". Included is A Very Happy Yule Log, a Christmas Eve/Christmas Day loop made up of a yule log presentation with Happy the Cat and Happy the Dog. In 2017, "A Happy Yule Log" was broadcast on November 22 (Thanksgiving Day), with abandoned piglet, Pip Squeak.

In March 2009, the network announced that it was partnering with the NYU Tisch School of the Arts’ Maurice Kanbar Institute of Film and TV to showcase short films by the school's students and alumni. The shorts began airing in October, and were also available for viewing online at the network's website hallmarkmoviechannel.com. Alec Baldwin is a Tisch alum who served as one of the judges to determine which films would appear on the network.

== See also ==
- List of Hallmark Channel Original Movies
