= Joanne Fluke =

American novelist (born c. 1943)

Joanne Fischmann
- Born: Joanne Gibson; Swanville, Minnesota, U.S.
- Education: St. Cloud State University; California State University, San Bernardino (BA)
- Occupation: Author
- Writing career
- Pen name: Joanne Fluke, John Fischer, R.J. Fischer, Jo Gibson, Chris Hunter, Gina Jackson, Kathryn Kirkwood
- Genres: Cozy mystery, horror
- Notable work: Hannah Swensen mystery series
- Website: www.joannefluke.com

Joanne Fischmann (née Gibson, born c. 1943 in Swanville, Minnesota) is an American writer, using the pen name Joanne Fluke. She is best known for her cozy mystery series surrounding a small-town baker, Hannah Swensen. Six movies for the Hallmark Channel have been created based on her Hannah Swensen series. Fluke is also known for making chocolate chip cookies for her readers. Fluke has written under the pseudonyms John Fischer, R.J. Fischer, Jo Gibson, Chris Hunter, Gina Jackson and Kathryn Kirkwood.

== Personal life ==
Fluke was born to Cliff and Esther Gibson in c. 1943 in Swanville, Minnesota. She graduated from Swanville High School in 1960, attended St. Cloud State University and earned a B.A. in psychology, in 1973, from California State University, San Bernardino.

Fluke has been baking since she was a child and comes from a long line of bakers.

According to the author's website, "While pursuing her writing career, Joanne has worked as a public school teacher, a psychologist, a musician, a private detective’s assistant, a corporate, legal, and pharmaceutical secretary, a short-order cook, a florist’s assistant, a caterer and party planner, a computer consultant on a now-defunct operating system, a production assistant on a TV quiz show, half of a screenwriting team with her husband, and a mother, wife, and homemaker."

Fluke is married to television writer Ruel E. Fischmann and lives with her husband, children and stepchildren in southern California.

== Work ==
In the 1980s, Fluke began writing young adult horror stories under the name Jo Gibson.

Fluke began writing her cozy mystery series starring Hannah Swensen, an "amateur sleuth and baker", in 2000. The idea for the series came out of Fluke's desire to create a cookbook, and her editor's suggestion that she write a cozy mystery series. Fluke combined the two ideas by including recipes in the series. Hannah Swensen lives in a small Minnesota town, and Fluke feels that the stories are a welcome escape from reality. Library Journal writes that the depiction of the story in Cinnamon Roll Murder is so natural, it is difficult to remember that the characters are fictional. Booklist praised her plot-twists in Devil's Food Cake Murder. Her book, Wedding Cake Murder, sees Swensen getting married and solving a crime in the same story.

== Published works ==
=== As Joanne Fluke ===
==== Hannah Swensen series ====
(All 35 titles shown below)

- Chocolate Chip Cookie Murder (2001)
- Strawberry Shortcake Murder (2002)
- Blueberry Muffin Murder (2002)
- Lemon Meringue Pie Murder (2003)
- Fudge Cupcake Murder (2004)
- Sugar Cookie Murder (2004)
- Peach Cobbler Murder (2005)
- Cherry Cheesecake Murder (2006)
- Key Lime Pie Murder (2007)
- Candy Cane Murder (October 2007) (novella)
- Carrot Cake Murder: A Hannah Swensen Mystery (2008)
- Cream Puff Murder (March 2009)
- Plum Pudding Murder (October 2009)
- Apple Turnover Murder (February 2010)
- Gingerbread Cookie Murder (October 2010) (novella)
- Devil's Food Cake Murder (February 2011)
- Cinnamon Roll Murder (February 2012)
- Red Velvet Cupcake Murder (February 2013)
- Joanne Fluke's Lake Eden Cookbook (September 2013) (includes short story and recipes)
- Blackberry Pie Murder (February 2014)
- Double Fudge Brownie Murder (February 2015)
- Wedding Cake Murder (February 2016)
- Christmas Caramel Murder (September 2016)
- Banana Cream Pie Murder (February 2017)
- Raspberry Danish Murder (February 2018)
- Christmas Cake Murder (September 2018)
- Chocolate Cream Pie Murder (February 2019)
- Coconut Layer Cake Murder (February 2020)
- Christmas Cupcake Murder (September 2020)
- Triple Chocolate Cheesecake Murder (February 2021)
- Christmas Dessert Murder (October 2021)
- Caramel Pecan Roll Murder (February, 2022)
- Pink Lemonade Cake Murder (July, 2023)
- Chocolate Chip Cookie Murder – 25th Anniversary Edition (April 2025)
- Pumpkin Chiffon Pie Murder (TBD)

=== Other works ===
- The Stepchild (1980)
- The Other Child (1983; reprinted August 2014)
- Winter Chill (1984; reprinted August 2013)
- Cold Judgment (1985; reprinted October 2014)
- Vengeance is Mine (1986)
- Video Kill (1989; reprinted May 2013)
- Final Appeal (1989)
- Dead Giveaway (1990; reprinted April 2014)
- The Dead Girl (1993)
- Fatal Identity (1993)
- Deadly Memories (1995)
- Eyes (1996; reprinted November 2015)
- Sugar and Spice (2006) (A collaborative with Fern Michaels, Beverly Barton, and Shirley Jump)
- Wicked (2016)

=== Under pseudonyms ===
Fluke has been published under several pseudonyms, including Jo Gibson, Chris Hunter, John Fischer, R.J. Fischer, Kathryn Kirkwood and Gina Jackson.

Teen Thrillers (as Jo Gibson)

- "Obsessed" (June 2014): combines "The Crush" (March 1994) and "The Crush II" (September 1994)
- "Twisted" (July 2014): combines "My Bloody Valentine" (January 1995), "The Seance" and "Slay Bells" (December 1994)
- "Afraid" (August 2014): combines "Dance of Death" (December 1996) and "The Dead Girl" (November 1993)

Regency Romances (as Kathryn Kirkwood)

- A Match for Melissa
- A Season for Samantha
- A Husband for Holly
- A Valentine for Vanessa
- A Match for Mother (novella)
- A Townhouse for Tessa
- Winter Kittens (novella)
