= Cozy mystery =

Subgenre of crime fiction

Cozy mysteries (or cosy mysteries) are a sub-genre of crime fiction in which sex and violence occur offstage, the detective is an amateur sleuth, and the crime and detection take place in a small, socially intimate community. Cozy mysteries thus stand in contrast to hardboiled fiction, in which more violence and explicit sexuality are central to the plot. The term "cozy" was used to describe works in this genre by the 1960s, though it only gained widespread recognition in the late 20th century, when various writers produced work in an attempt to recreate the Golden Age of Detective Fiction.

== Characters ==
The detectives in such stories are almost always amateurs and often women, though exceptions include village policeman Hamish Macbeth, featured in a series of novels by M. C. Beaton, and reporter Jim Qwilleran, featured in The Cat Who... series by Lillian Jackson Braun. These characters are typically well educated and intuitive, and hold jobs that bring them into constant contact with other residents of their community and the surrounding region (e.g., caterer, innkeeper, librarian, teacher, dog trainer, shop owner, reporter). Like other amateur detectives, they typically have a contact in the police force who can give them access to important information about the case at hand, but the contact is typically a spouse, lover, friend, or family member rather than a former colleague. Dismissed by the authorities in general as nosy busybodies, particularly if they are middle-aged or elderly women, the detectives in cozy mysteries are thus left free to eavesdrop, gather clues, and use their native intelligence and intuitive "feel" for the social dynamics of the community to solve the crime.

The murderers in cozy mysteries are typically neither psychopaths nor serial killers and, once unmasked, are usually taken into custody without violence. They are generally members of the community where the murder occurs, able to hide in plain sight, and their motives (greed, jealousy, revenge) are often rooted in events years or even generations old. The murderers are typically rational and often highly articulate, enabling them to explain or elaborate on their motives after their unmasking.

The supporting characters in cozy mysteries are often broadly drawn and used as comic relief. The accumulation of such characters in long-running cozy mystery series, such as those of Charlotte MacLeod, frequently creates a stock company of eccentrics among whom the detective stands out as the most, perhaps only, truly sane person.

One subtle humorous theme in such series is a main character who finds themselves getting involved in many high-profile cases, often by accident. The main character Jessica Fletcher, in Murder, She Wrote came across a murder in every episode: "No matter where she goes, somebody dies!"

== Content ==
Cozy mysteries typically take place in a town, village, or other small, insular communities where the main characters have long-standing social relationships. The amateur detective is usually well-liked and gets the community members to talk freely about one another. Usually, at least one knowledgeable, nosy, yet reliable character knows everyone's personal history and interrelationships and can fill in the blanks to help the amateur detective solve the case.

Cozy mystery series frequently have a prominent thematic element introduced by the detective's job, pet or hobby. Diane Mott Davidson's mysteries, for example, revolve around cooking, Parnell Hall's around crossword puzzles, and Charlotte MacLeod's "Sarah Kelling" series around art. Other series focus on topics including fishing, golfing, hiking, fashion, antiques, and interior decoration. Cat-lovers are well represented among the ranks of cozy-mystery detectives, notably in the work of Lilian Jackson Braun and Rita Mae Brown; herbalists appear frequently (of whom the best known is Ellis Peters' medieval sleuth, Brother Cadfael). There are also cozy mystery series with themes of Christmas, Easter, and other holidays.

While de-emphasis on sex and violence, emphasis on puzzle-solving over suspense, the setting of a small town, and a focus on a hobby or occupation are characteristic elements of cozy mysteries, the boundaries of the subgenre remain vague.

== Examples ==
=== Literature ===
- Nancy Atherton's Aunt Dimity novels feature American Lori Sheppard, who settles in an English village thanks to an inheritance from "Aunt" Dimity (an old friend of her late mother's). Dimity communicates with Lori, via a magical journal, to help solve mysteries involving Lori and her neighbors.
- Lilian Jackson Braun's Cat Who... series began as a more "hardboiled" mystery series in the late 1960s but transformed into cozy mysteries when the author resumed writing them almost 20 years later.
- Rita Mae Brown wrote three cozy mystery series:
  - The Foxhunting Mystery Series, set in Virginia, features "Sister Jane" Arnold, a 70-year-old Master of the Fox Hunt.
  - The Mags & Baxter Mystery Series, set in Nevada, features Mags Rogers, ex-Wall Streeter; Baxter, Mag's wirehaired dachshund; Jeep Reed, Mags' Grandmother Rancher; and King, Jeep's German Shepherd cross.
  - The Mrs. Murphy series of animal cozy mysteries, set in the Deep South, is "co-authored" with Sneaky Pie Brown, the talking cat whom the main cat character, Mrs. Murphy, is based on.
- Sarah Caudwell's Hilary Tamar Series features Professor Hilary Tamar, and a cast of clever and trouble-prone young London barristers.
- The Miss Marple character, created by Agatha Christie, appears in 12 novels which have been adapted numerous times for film and television.
- Blaize Clement's Dixie Hemingway Mysteries chronicle the adventures of a cop turned pet-sitter in Siesta Key, Florida.
- Cleo Coyle's Coffeehouse Mysteries feature Greenwich Village coffeeshop owner Clare Cosi, who sleuths with help from her coffee-hunting ex-husband and her staff of quirky baristas.
- Carola Dunn's Daisy Dalrymple detective series follows the Honourable Daisy Dalrymple and her "copper" husband DCI Alec Fletcher. Many of the murders occur in aristocratic country houses Daisy is visiting to write articles about, in her 1920s "modern-woman's" career as a journalist. A cast of best friends and relatives appears, as do members of Alec's team of detectives who are always on Daisy's side when Alec is trying to keep her out of the case.
- Joanne Fluke's novels about Hannah Swensen, a young baker and amateur sleuth living in the fictional town of Lake Eden, Minnesota. The books include recipes for baking.
- Carolyn Jourdan's Out on a Limb concerns a desperate search for a young woman who mysteriously vanished from the Great Smoky Mountains National Park during a gathering of world-famous biologists and botanists. The middle-aged accidental amateur sleuths are a female home health care nurse and a male park ranger.
- Frances and Richard Lockridge's Mr. and Mrs. North novels feature an ordinary couple who live in Greenwich Village with their cats Gin, Sherry and Martini and solve mysteries.
- The character Father Brown, created by G. K. Chesterton, is a Catholic priest who doubles as an amateur detective. He has been adapted numerous times for film and television.
- The Grantchester Mysteries, written by James Runcie, is a series of short stories set in the 1950s in the Cambridgeshire village of Grantchester, with the Anglican vicar Sidney Chambers, and subsequently vicar William Davenport, each of whom develop a sideline in sleuthing with the help of Detective Inspector Geordie Keating. Adapted into a British television series, Grantchester.
- The character Agatha Raisin, created by M. C. Beaton, is a public-relations agent who moved from London to Carsely in the Cotswolds when she sold her company in Mayfair and took early retirement; she sets up her own detective agency to solve crimes and murders. Adapted into a British television series of the same name.
- Ian Moore's Follet Valley Mysteries series, set in the fictional Val de Follet in the Loire Valley, follows middle-aged Englishman and B&B owner Richard Ainsworth as he's begrudgingly dragged out of his comfort zone and into solving murders by the enigmatic Valérie d'Orçay.
- The Apothecary Diaries by Natsu Hyuuga is a historical fiction series that follows an apprentice apothecary named Maomao who begins investigating poisonings and other mysterious happenings in the imperial palace while working there as an indentured serving woman.

=== Television ===
- Hetty Wainthropp Investigates is a British drama starring Patricia Routledge as the eponymous elderly pensioner who solves mysteries around her Lancashire neighbourhood.
- Murder, She Wrote is an American series starring Angela Lansbury as Jessica Fletcher, a mystery novelist who finds that her work often has parallels with her own life.
- Pie in the Sky is a British mystery television series that combines sleuthing and cooking. A police detective and gourmet runs his own restaurant in between solving crimes.
- Rosemary & Thyme is a British mystery television series that combines accidental amateur sleuthing and gardening. A few episodes have been adapted and expanded as full-length novels.
- Death in Paradise is a British–French television series, which focuses on a detective inspector sent from the Metropolitan Police in London to investigate murder investigations on the fictional Caribbean island of Saint Marie, a British Overseas Territory with a French colonial history. During the stay, the DI tries to fit in, and get used to the environment, and learn everything about the island's culture. Afterwards, the DI decides to remain on the island and eventually warms to the island lifestyle. Usually, the DI serves as the main character, as well as the main protagonist of the series, but any of the characters may change over time during each series or so depending on the storyline.
- Mr & Mrs Murder is an Australian television series about a married couple Nicola and Charlie Buchanan, who run an industrial cleaning business specialising in crime scenes. They use this experience to become amateur sleuths.
- The Brokenwood Mysteries is a New Zealand television series about Detective Inspector Mike Shepherd, who is sent from Auckland to Brokenwood to investigate murder investigations there. During his stay, he decides to settle down in Brokenwood for a more peaceful life.
- Partners in Crime is a British television series set in the 1950s, and the era of the Cold War against Stalin, with an everyday family doing their everyday jobs while solving crimes at the same time, based on two Partners in Crime stories, The Secret Adversary and N or M? by Agatha Christie.
- Queens of Mystery is a British television series about Matilda Stone, a young detective who has been assigned to the constabulary in her fictional hometown village of Wildemarsh, England, where she is reunited with her three crime-writing aunts Cat, Beth, and Jane.
- My Life Is Murder is an Australian–New Zealand television series that combines sleuthing and baking. Alexa Crowe, is a former detective of the Victoria Police Criminal Investigation Branch (CIB), and as a side hustle, she bakes bread in her kitchen for Baristas Café, as well as solving the most baffling crimes, as well as coping with the frustrations of everyday life. From the second season, she moved to Auckland to be closer to her brother, Will. She also starts bread deliveries to Reuben's.
- The Madame Blanc Mysteries is a British television series about a Cheshire antiques dealer, Jean White, who helps solve an array of mysteries and deaths in the fictional village of Sainte Victoire in the South of France.
- Sister Boniface Mysteries is a British television series about a Catholic nun at St. Vincent's Convent in the fictional town of Great Slaughter in the Cotswolds. In addition to her religious duties at the convent, she makes wine and has a PhD in forensic science, allowing her to serve as a scientific adviser to the local police on investigations.
- Darby and Joan is an Australian television series about a retired Australian detective and an English nurse work together to solve the mystery of her husband's recent death.
- Death Valley is a British television series about a retired actor, John Chapel (known for his titular role in the detective series Caesar), who helps Detective Sergeant Janie Mallowan (an avid fan of Caesar) to solve murders in South Wales using his insights as a fictional detective and an actor.
- Ludwig is a British television series about puzzle maker John "Ludwig" Taylor who uses his experience to solve a series of murders in Cambridge, initially while posing as his twin brother Detective Chief Inspector James Taylor to investigate his disappearance but later as himself as a crime scene consultant.
- Signora Volpe is a British television series about a former British spy, Sylvia Fox, who tries to settle down in a new life in picturesque Panicale, Italy. However, she soon becomes involved in solving local crimes.
- Harry Wild is a British television series about Harriet "Harry" Wild, a retired literature professor with a knack for solving mysteries.
- Whitstable Pearl is a British television series about Pearl Nolan, a single mother of a grown son, and an ex-police officer, is a private detective who, together with her mum, runs the Whitstable Pearl, a seafood restaurant in the coastal town of Whitstable, based on two Whitstable Pearl novels, The Whitstable Pearl Mystery and Disappearance at Oare by Julie Wassmer.
- Mrs Sidhu Investigates is a British television series about a recently widowed caterer Mrs. Sidhu, who juggles her business with encouraging her son Tez to find his passion, all while solving crimes in Berkshire.
- Shakespeare & Hathaway: Private Investigators is a British television series about ex-detective inspector (DI) Frank Hathaway, now a debt-laden private investigator, who meets Luella Shakespeare when she employs him to investigate the fiancé she met online. After her name is cleared, she uses her recovered savings (and her late husband's estate) to buy into Frank's business thus effectively becoming Frank's partner in order to save him from the bailiffs. Their only employee, Hathaway's assistant, Sebastian Brudenell, is a young aspiring RADA-trained actor who uses his skills when undercover investigations are required. He lives above a theatre costumier run by Gloria Fonteyn.
- Recipes for Love and Murder is a British–South African mystery television series that also combines sleuthing and cooking, based on the Tannie Maria Mystery novels by Sally Andrew.

=== Radio ===
The radio adaptations of A Charles Paris Mystery have been characterised as "cosy crime".

=== Comics ===
- Resident Alien, created by Peter Hogan and Steve Parkhouse, published through Dark Horse Comics, follows the story is about an alien who crash lands on Earth, then poses as a doctor while he awaits a rescue. He is pursued by a government agency and passes his time solving murders and other mysteries. Adapted into an American television series of the same name.

== See also ==
- Cozy catastrophe
