= Sandy Sidhu =

Canadian actress

- Born: Sandy Sidhu; Nanaimo, British Columbia
- Occupation: Actress
- Years active: 2006–present
- Website: https://sandy-sidhu.squarespace.com/

Sandy Sidhu is a Canadian film and television actress based in Vancouver, British Columbia. She is known for her leading role as Nazneen Khan in the medical drama series Nurses (2020–2021).

== Early life ==
Sidhu was born in Nanaimo, British Columbia, Canada, and is of Indian descent. She began acting at the age of 14. Her first performance was in a production of West Side Story. She then moved to Vancouver to attend the University of British Columbia where she received a degree in cell biology and genetics. After graduation, Sidhu left Canada to attend the Lee Strasberg Theatre and Film Institute.

== Filmography ==
=== Film ===
Year	Title	Role	Notes
2006	The Wishing Bridge	Jess	Short film
2011	Afternoon Tea	Priya	
2014	Preggoland	Linda	
2014	Becoming Sophie	Party Guest	Short film
2015	Into the Forest	Quiz Woman	
2019	Stalled	Ilona	Short film
2021	Donkeyhead	Sandy	

=== Television ===
Year	Title	Role	Notes
2009	Stargate Universe	Dr. Mehta	2 episodes
2010	Shattered	Arisha Singal	Episode: "Don't Wanna Die"
2012	Primeval: New World	Pallavi Grewal	Episode: "Fear of Flying"
2014	Arctic Air	Rachel	2 episodes
2014	Intelligence	Amelia Hayes	
2015	Motive	Candice	Episode: "A Problem Like Maria"
2015	Falling Skies	The Queen	Voice role; episode: "Reborn"
2016	Revenge Porn	Gail	Television film
2016	Supernatural	Constance	Episode: "Rock Never Dies"
2017	All Of My Heart: Inn Love	VP of Operations	Hallmark Channel television film
2017	Supergirl	Deputy Clemens	Episode: "Midvale"
2018	Frozen in Love	Janet Dunleavy	Hallmark Channel television film
2018	Grey's Anatomy	Priya	Episode: "Games People Play"
2018	You Me Her	Jett	Episode: "Inconceivable!"
2018	Six	Sam Rivera	2 episodes
2018	The Wedding March 4: Something Old, Something New	Lena Salazar	Hallmark Channel television film
2018–2019	Legends of Tomorrow	Nasreen	3 episodes
2018	Mingle All the Way	Lisa Turner	Hallmark Channel television film
2020–2021	Nurses	Nazneen Khan	Main role
2020	Home Before Dark	Meena Roy	2 episodes
2025	Happy Face	Dr. Wendy Chin	2 episodes
2026	Tracker	Detective Blake	Episode: "To the Bone"
