= Tammy Gillis =

Canadian actress

- Born: October 25, 1978 (age 47); Manitoba, Canada
- Occupation: Actress
- Years active: 2000–present
- Website: tammygillis.com

Tammy Gillis (born October 25, 1978) is a Canadian actress who works on television and film projects across the country.

== Early life and education ==
Gillis was born in Dauphin, Manitoba. She studied pre-law at the University of Manitoba.

== Career ==
Tammy Gillis grew up in rural Manitoba and got her start on the stage in her hometown playing Grandpa in her first school play. While attending university, she was discovered by a modelling agency. Shortly after signing with them, she booked a series of commercials for Greenkids starring Lyle Lovett and landed her first film role in the award-winning short film The Heart of the World directed by cult film director, Guy Maddin.

Her onscreen credits include roles in White Noise 2 starring Nathan Fillion and Shooter starring Mark Wahlberg. Tammy played a leading role in the indie feature film Under the Apple Box, which received an honorable mention at the New Jersey Film Festival and also screened at the Women's International Film Festival in Miami in March 2013. She appeared on the Bravo series Girlfriend's Guide to Divorce, as well as the romantic comedy A Novel Romance starring alongside Amy Acker and Dylan Bruce and the Lifetime thriller Stolen from the Womb starring alongside Laura Mennell and Larisa Oleynik.

She has guest starred on CTV's drama Motive as well as her recurring guest starring role on the HBO Canada series Less Than Kind and the Douglas Coupland CBC comedy "jPod" TV series Less than Kind. She has appeared in roles on the CW's Supernatural, Showcase's Lost Girl, SpikeTV's Blue Mountain State, Showcase's Endgame, Reaper, The L Word, and the final season of Battlestar Galactica. and many more. Her MOW's include Stealing Paradise starring Rachel Leigh Cook, The Mermaid Chair starring Kim Basinger and Home by Christmas starring Linda Hamilton.

Gillis was a spokesmodel for Canadian underwear company Ginch Gonch. She travelled with the line to France, to El Salvador and Russia. She was named one of Femme Fatale's 'Fresh Faces of the Year' in 2007 and has been seen in the magazines UMM and Sharp for Men.

In 2016, Gillis appeared in the sixth season of ABC's Once Upon a Time as Jill.

Gillis appeared in the Hallmark Channel original movie Frozen in Love, which stars Rachael Leigh Cook and Niall Matter. The film was broadcast on the channel in January 2018. As of 2018, she is currently playing a police officer named Marissa Staub in Freeform’s drama-fantasy series Siren.

== Filmography ==
=== Film ===
Year	Title	Role	Notes
2000	The Heart of the World	Mary Magdalene (Uncredited)	Short
2001	Culture of Silence	Victim	Short
2002	Cemetery Love Story	Daisy	Short
2004	Din	Female Cyclist	Short
2004	Lucky Stars	Kelly	
2005	Jilted	The Sister	Short
2007	White Noise: The Light	Scooter Girl	
2007	Shooter	Waitress (Uncredited)	
2007	Blood Brothers: Reign of Terror	Kim	
2008	The Valet	The Hostess	Short
2008	Sanguine	Aunt Lucy	Short
2010	Another Brief Moment	Cynthia	Short
2012	Under the Apple Box	Leila (Adult)	
2014	The Timekeeper	Georgina	Short
2015	No Men Beyond This Point	Female Pundit	
2015	Kindergarten Da Bin Inch Wieder	Clara Ragnarson	Short
2016	Menorca	Claire/Wife	
2018	Violentia	Marie Anderson	
2018	Sonder	Katia	Short
2019	A Dog’s Way Home	Officer Leon	
2019	37-Teen	Claire	
2020	Torn: Dark Bullets	Detective Omari	

=== Television ===
Year	Title	Role	Notes
2001	Inside the Osmonds	Mary	Television Film
2002	The Chris Isaak Show	Shelly	Episode: “The Hidden Mommy”
2006	The L Word	Tammy	Episode: “Lifeline”
2006	Trophy Wife	Libby	Television Film
2006	The Mermaid Chair	Young Kat	Television Film
2006	Home by Christmas	Donna	Television Film
2007	Reaper	Holly Actor	Episode: “Love, Bullets and Blacktop”
2008	jPOD	Sarah	2 episodes
2009	Battlestar Galactica	Marine #2	2 episodes
2011	Shattered	Dr. Weston	Episode: “Finding the Boy”
2011	Endgame	Lexis	Episode: “The Caffeine Hit”
2011	Stealing Paradise	Elise Shayne	Television Film
2011	Blue Mountain State	Karen Gilday	Episode: “One Week”
2011	Supernatural	Kelly	Episode: “Season Seven, Time for a Wedding!”
2012	Lost Girl	Marissa	Episode: “Table for Fae”
2012	Less Than Kind	Barbara	3 episodes
2013	Motive	Claudia Powell	Episode: “Detour”
2014	Stolen from the Womb	Paula	Television Film
2014	Girlfriends’ Guide to Divorce	Kath	Episode: “Rule #21: Leave Childishness to the Children”
2015	A Novel Romance	Nina	Hallmark Television Film
2015	Ties That Bind	Carla Martin	Episode: “Ghosts”
2015	Continuum	Doctor (Uncredited)	2 episodes
2015	Signed, Sealed, Delivered: Truth Be Told	Randilynn Amidon	Hallmark Television Film
2015	Signed, Sealed, Delivered: The Impossible Dream	Randilynn Amidon	Hallmark Television Film
2016	The Support Group	Julia Coles	2 episodes
2016	Unleashing Mr. Darcy	Jenna Scott	Hallmark Television Film
2016	Wedding Bells	Amy	Hallmark Television Film
2016	Once Upon a Time	Peasant Wife	Episode: “Changelings”
2017	Murder, She Baked: Just Desserts	Michele Bishop	Hallmark Television Film
2017	The Arrangement	Jen	2 episodes
2017	Tiny House of Terror	Lindsay	Television Film
2017–2018	Ghost Wars	Jane	4 episodes
2018	Frozen in Love	Erica Parker	Hallmark Television Film
2018	Deadly Deed: A Fixer Upper Mystery	Whitney Sloane	Hallmark Television Film
2018	The Sweetest Heart	Sarah	Hallmark Television Film
2018	Marrying Mr. Darcy	Jenna Scott	Hallmark Television Film
2018	Dead Inside	Cristina Dunn	Pilot
2018–2020	Siren	Deputy Marissa Staub	Seasons 1 – 3, 16 episodes
2019	Aurora Teagarden Mysteries: A Game of Cat and Mouse	Bree Carson	Hallmark Television Film
2019	Van Helsing	Monica	2 episodes
2020	The Detectives	Detective Debbie Harris	2 episodes
2020	The Case That Haunts Me	Detective Debbie Harris	2 episodes
