= Stephanie Bond (author) =

American novelist

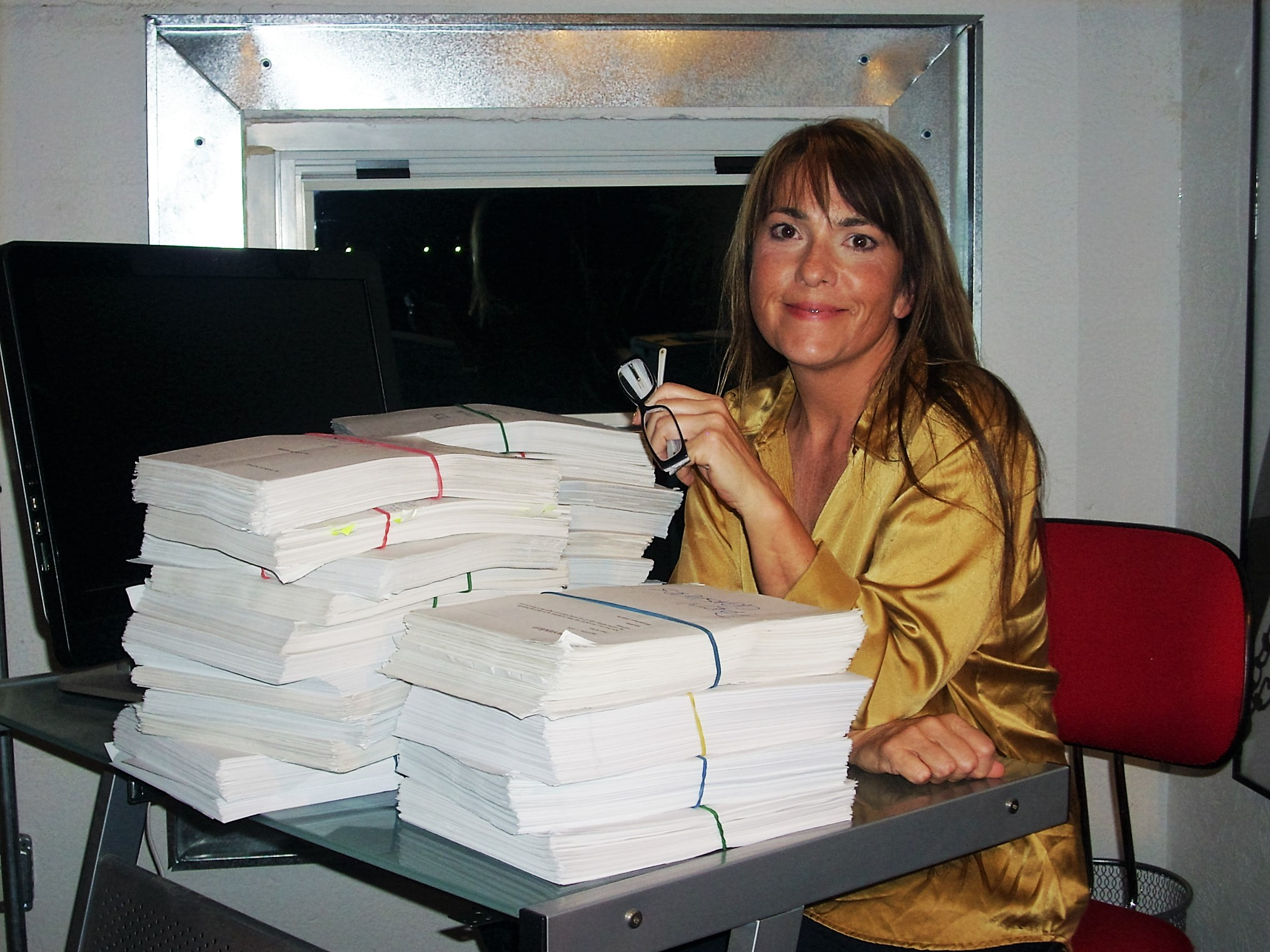
- Stephanie Bond in her office 2015
- Born: March 25, 1965 (age 61)
- Occupation: Novelist
- Writing career
- Period: 1997–present
- Genres: Contemporary romance, romantic mystery
- Notable work: It Takes A Rebel
- Notable awards: RITA award – Short Contemporary Romance; 2001 It Takes A Rebel
- Website: www.stephaniebond.com

Stephanie Bond, also known under the pseudonym Stephanie Bancroft, is an American born author known for writing commercial fiction novels of romance and mystery. She published her first book, Irresistible?, through Harlequin Enterprises in 1997 and, a few years later, left a corporate computer programming job to began writing full-time. During her career she has written dozens of romance and mystery novels, novellas, and short stories for publishers such as Harlequin, HarperCollins, and Random House. In 2011 Bond began self-publishing under her own imprint NeedtoRead Books. In 2015 Bond licensed her Body Movers series to Amazon for their Kindle Worlds fan-fiction program. In 2016, Bond licensed her Southern Roads romance series to Kindle Worlds and her independently published romantic comedy "Stop the Wedding!" was adapted into a television film for the Hallmark Channel.

== Bibliography ==
=== Body Movers ===
1. Body Movers (2006)
2. 2 Bodies for the Price of 1 (2007)
3. 3 Men and a Body (2008)
4. 4 Bodies and a Funeral (2009)
5. 5 Bodies to Die For (2009)
6. 6 Killer Bodies (2009)
7. 7 Brides for 7 Bodies (2015)
8. 8 Bodies is Enough (2017)
9. 9 Bodies Rolling (2018)
10. 10 Bodies Lying (2019)
11. 11 Bodies Moving On (2020)
12. 12 Bodies and a Wedding (2021)

==== Related Body Movers works ====
- Party Crashers (2005, novella, Body Movers #0.5)
- 6 1/2 Body Parts (2012, novella, Body Movers #6.5)

=== Sex for Beginners ===
1. Watch And Learn (2008)
2. In A Bind (2008)
3. No Peeking... (2008)

=== Southern Roads ===
1. Baby, Drive South (2011)
2. Baby, Come Home (2011)
3. Baby, Don't Go (2011)
4. Southern Roads Boxed Series (2023)

==== Related Southern Roads works ====
- Baby, I'm Yours (2011, short story, Southern Roads, #0.5)
- Baby, Hold On (2012, short story, Southern Roads #3.5)
- Baby, I'm Back (2013, short story, Southern Roads #3.6)
- Baby, It's You (2016, novella)

=== Two Guys Detective Agency ===
1. Two Guys Detective Agency (2013)
2. Second Helping (2022)

=== Voodoo in Mojo ===
1. In Deep Voodoo (2005)
2. Finding Your Mojo (2006, re-released as Voodoo or Die)
3. Voodoo Diaries (May 2024)

=== Daily Serials ===
- Coma Girl (online daily serial), part 1 (July 1, 2016), part 2 (August 1, 2016), part 3 (September 1, 2016), part 4 (October 1, 2016), part 5 (November 1, 2016), part 6 (December 1, 2016)
- Coma Girl, The Complete Daily Serial (2017)
- Temp Girl (online daily serial), part 1 (July 1, 2017), part 2 (August 1, 2017), part 3 (September 1, 2017), part 4 (October 1, 2017), part 5 (November 1, 2017), part 6 (December 1, 2017)
- Temp Girl, The Complete Daily Serial (2018)
- Comeback Girl (online daily serial), part 1 (July 1, 2018), part 2 (August 1, 2018), part 3 (September 1, 2018), part 4 (October 1, 2018), part 5 (November 1, 2018), part 6 (December 1, 2018)
- Comeback Girl, The Complete Daily Serial (2019)
- Factory Girl (online daily serial), part 1 (July 1, 2019), part 2 (August 1, 2019), part 3 (September 1, 2019), part 4 (October 1, 2019), part 5 (November 1, 2019), part 6 (December 1, 2019)
- Factory Girl, The Complete Daily Serial (2020)
- Lottery Girl (online daily serial), part 1 (July 1, 2020), part 2 (August 1, 2020), part 3 (September 1, 2020), part 4 (October 1, 2020), part 5 (November 1, 2020), part 6 (December 1, 2020)
- Lottery Girl, The Complete Daily Serial (2021)
- Elevator Girl (online daily serial), part 1 (July 1, 2021), part 2 (August 1, 2021), part 3 (September 1, 2021), part 4 (October 1, 2021), part 5 (November 1, 2021), part 6 (December 1, 2021)
- Elevator Girl, The Complete Daily Serial (2022)
- Escort Girl (online daily serial), part 1 (July 1, 2022), part 2 (August 1, 2022), part 3 (September 1, 2022), part 4 (October 1, 2022), part 5 (November 1, 2022), part 6 (December 1, 2022)
- Escort Girl, The Complete Daily Serial (2023)
- Holiday Girl (online daily serial), part 1 (July 1, 2023), part 2 (August 1, 2023), part 3 (September 1, 2023), part 4 (October 1, 2023), part 5 (November 1, 2023), part 6 (December 1, 2023)
- Holiday Girl, The Complete Daily Serial (2024)
- Graveyard Girl (online daily serial), part 1 (July 1, 2024), part 2 (August 1, 2024), part 3 (September 1, 2024), part 4 (October 1, 2024), part 5 (November 1, 2024), part 6 (December 1, 2024)
- Graveyard Girl, The Complete Daily Serial (2025)
- Bourbon Girl (online daily serial), part 1 (July 1, 2025), part 2 (August 1, 2025), part 3 (September 1, 2025), part 4 (October 1, 2025), part 5 (November 1, 2025), part 6 (December 1, 2025)

=== Screenplays ===
- Long-Distance Wedding (2022), romantic comedy, available as an ebook

=== Other work ===
- Irresistible? (1997, updated and republished 2024)
- Almost a Family (1997, originally written as Stephanie Bancroft, updated and republished 2011)
- License to Thrill (1997, originally written as Stephanie Bancroft, updated and republished 2011)
- KIDS is a 4-Letter Word (1998, updated and republished 2024)
- WIFE is a 4-Letter Word (1998, updated and republished 2020)
- Your Wish is My Command (1998, originally written as Stephanie Bancroft, updated and republished in 2011 as Three Wishes )
- Manhunting in Mississippi (1998, updated and republished 2020)
- Naughty or Nice? (1998, updated and republished 2021)
- Club Cupid (1999, updated and republished 2022)
- About Last Night (1999, updated and republished 2024)
- It Takes a Rebel (2000, updated and republished 2020)
- A Funny Thing Happened on the Way to the Wedding (2000, eHarlequin.com interactive story)
- Too Hot to Sleep (2000, updated and republished 2024)
- Seeking Single Male (2000, updated and republished 2018)
- Our Husband (2000, updated and republished in 2011)
- After Hours (2001, novella, updated and republished in 2022)
- Two Sexy! (2001)
- Got Your Number (2001, updated and republished in 2011)
- 50 Days to Choose a Husband (2001, eHarlequin.com interactive story)
- I Think I Love You (2004, updated and republished 2011)
- Diamond Mine (2003, novella, updated and republished in 2019)
- In Too Deep (2003)
- Lovestruck (2003)
- Kill the Competition (2003, updated and republished 2011)
- The Truth About Shoes and Men (2004, short story)
- Cover Me (2004, updated and republished in 2020)
- Nobody’s Fool (2004, updated and republished 2023, novella)
- Whole Lotta Trouble (2004, updated and republished in 2011)
- My Favorite Mistake (2005)
- Taking Care of Business (2005, novella, updated and republished in 2020)
- Dirty Secrets of Daylily Drive (2006, novella)
- You Can Leave Your Hardhat On (2006, updated and republished 2022)
- Just Dare Me… (2006)
- Rex on the Beach (2007, novella, updated and republished 2021)
- She Did a Bad, Bad Thing (2007)
- Under the Mistletoe (2009)
- It’s Not About the Dress (2009)
- Enticed (2009, novella)
- Bump in the Night (2009)
- Between the Covers (2009, novella)
- Turning the Page (2009, novella)
- A New Chapter (2009, novella)
- Surprise Ending (2009, novella)
- Too Hot to Print (2010, novella)
- Her Sexy Valentine (2010)
- All Tangled Up (2012, novella)
- Stranded at Christmas (2020, novella)
- Stop the Wedding! (2012)

== Nonfiction ==
- Get a Life! 8 Steps to Create Your own Life List (2012)
- Your Personal Fiction-Writing Coach: 365 Days of Motivation & Tips to Write a Great Book! (2015)

== Adaptations ==
In 2016, Stephanie Bond's independently published romantic comedy "Stop the Wedding!" was adapted into a television film for the Hallmark Channel. The film premiered on June 11, 2016 as part of the channel's "June Weddings" series. Stop the Wedding starred Rachel Boston and Niall Matter as a man and woman determined to stop their relatives (Alan Thicke and Lini Evans) from marrying, but end up falling in love with each other. The production marked the first time Hallmark adapted an independently published novel into a film. The film went on to win a 2017 Leo Award for Best Direction (Television Film), for director Anne Wheeler.

In January 2018, CBS Studios optioned Bond's COMA GIRL series for TV series development.

In 2021, Bond launched COMA GIRL, the daily fiction podcast

In 2022, Bond launched TEMP GIRL, the daily fiction podcast.

== Awards and reception ==
- 2001 - Romance Writers of America RITA Award, Short Contemporary Romance – It Takes A Rebel
