= Michelle Harrison (actress) =

American actress

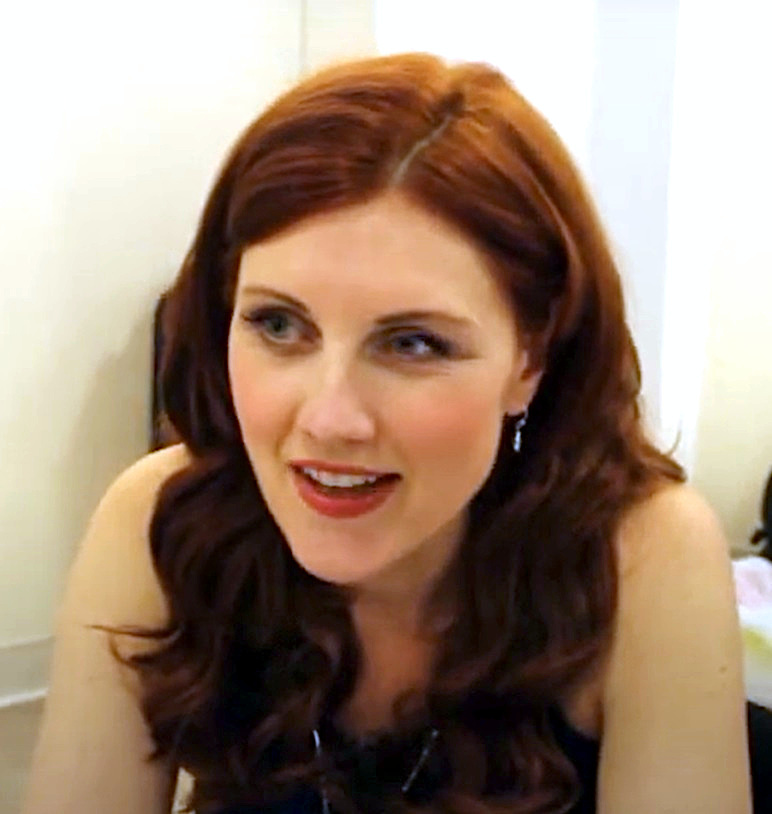
- Harrison at Harrisburg Comicon 2017
- Born: Michelle Nicole Johnston; March 24, 1975 (age 51); Puyallup, Washington, U.S.
- Occupation: Actress
- Years active: 1999–present
- Known for: The Flash
- Spouse: Matthew Harrison (m. 1998)
- Children: 2

Michelle Nicole Harrison (née Johnston; born March 24, 1975) is an American film and television actress, known as Kate Henry in Wild Roses (2009) and several characters in The Flash (2014).

== Early life and career ==
Michelle Harrison was born on March 24, 1975, as Michelle Nicole Johnston in Puyallup, Washington. She made her screen debut in 1999, marking the beginning of a long and diverse career in television and film. Harrison’s early work included supporting roles in a variety of TV series, such as Dead Man's Gun, Poltergeist: The Legacy, and Honey, I Shrunk the Kids: The TV Show. Harrison studied acting at the Circle in the Square Theatre School, New York City.

In 2000, she played Crane's assistant in The Guilty, the same year she starred in an episode of Cold Squad. She appeared in the films Pressure (2002), Paycheck (2003), and The Invisible (2007).

In 2008, she played a recurring role as Julie Reichert, in the Lifetime Movie Network television miniseries The Capture of the Green River Killer. In 2009, she secured a main role as Kate, the oldest daughter of the Henry family in the CBC Television cowboy drama series Wild Roses. In 2010, she appeared in an episode of Supernatural. In 2012, she played a Recurring role as Jessica in Emily Owens, M.D..

In 2013, she landed a supporting role as Nora Allen and look-alike doppelgängers in The CW series The Flash. She starred alongside Steven Weber in Hallmark Movies & Mysteries original film Tom Dick & Harriett as Harriett Fellows, and again the same year in The Mystery Cruise with co-star Gail O'Grady.

In 2014, Harrison had a recurring role on the Syfy series Continuum.

== Personal life ==
Michelle Harrison is married to fellow Canadian actor Matthew Harrison who is also an acting coach. The couple have two sons and reside on Bowen Island, British Columbia. In August 2025, Harrison announced via her Instagram account that she had been diagnosed with breast cancer and was undergoing treatment.

== Filmography ==
=== Film ===
Year	Title	Role	Notes
1999	Coffee	Beautiful woman	Short film
2000	The Guilty	Crane's assistant	
2000	Mr. Fortune's Smile	Mary	
2002	Pressure	Sara Loughlin	
2003	Paycheck	Jane	
2005	Come As You Are	Crystal	
2005	The Merry Ghost of Summerville	Juniper	Short film
2005	Capote	Babe Paley	Uncredited
2007	The Invisible	Detective Kate Tunney	
2007	In the Name of the King	Hysterical woman	
2007	Good Luck Chuck	Anisha Carpenter	
2008	Elegy	Second student	
2009	Love Happens	Cynthia	
2010	Altitude	Sara's mother	
2011	Diary of a Wimpy Kid: Rodrick Rules	Wealthy Woman	
2012	Hit 'n Strum	Stephanie	
2012	Triangle	Shelley (voice)	Short film
2014	Cruel and Unusual	Doris	
2015	Circular	Mother	Short film
2016	Stagecoach: The Texas Jack Story	Laura Lee Reed	
2017	Fifty Shades Darker	Auction bidder	
2018	Fifty Shades Freed	Rhian Flynn	
2018	Freaks	Nancy Reed	
2018	The Prodigal Dad	Mary	
2021	Warrior of Eight Flags		Pre-production
2023	re: Uniting	Rachel	
2025	Robert	Hannah	Short film

=== Television ===
Year	Title	Role	Notes	Ref
1999	Dead Man's Gun	Hannah Devry	Episode: "The Phrenologist"	
1999	Poltergeist: The Legacy	Claire	Uncredited; Episode: "Forget Me Not"	
1999	First Wave	Melissa	Episode: "The Apostles"	
2000	Cold Squad	Melinda	Episode: "Death By Intent: Part 2"	
2000	Honey, I Shrunk the Kids: The TV Show	Allison	Episode: "Honey, It's an Interplanetary, Extraordinary Life"	
2000	Secret Agent Man	Staffer #1	Episode: "From Prima With Love"	
2000	Hollywood Off-Ramp	Jane	2 episodes	
2000	So Weird	Heather	Episode: "Earth 101"	
2001	Stargate SG-1	Assistant	Episode: "Absolute Power"	
2001	Dodson's Journey	Kristin	Television film	
2001	The Outer Limits	Gabrielle Pace	Episode: "Alien Shop"	
2001	Snow White: The Fairest of Them All	Lady in waiting #1	Television film	
2002	Romantic Comedy 101	Sabrina	Television film	
2002	Beyond Belief: Fact or Fiction	Jeannie	Episode: "Mail Order Degree"	
2002	First Shot	Courtney Robinson	Television film	
2002	The Dead Zone	Astronomer	Episode: "Shaman"	
2002	John Doe	All American Girl	Episode: "Doe Re: Me"	
2002	The Twilight Zone	Kelly Freed	Episode: "Hunted"	
2003	A Crime of Passion	Virginia Harrington	Television film	
2003	Out of Order	Crista	6 episodes	
2003	Lucky 7	Maya	Television film	
2003-2004	Andromeda	Female guide android	2 episodes	
2004	Tru Calling	Michelle Carey	2 episodes	
2004	The Legend of Butch & Sundance	Mary Margaret Place	Television film	
2005	Behind the Camera: The Unauthorized Story of Mork & Mindy	Valerie Velardi	Television film	
2005	The Wonderful World of Disney	Princess #12	Episode: "Once Upon a Mattress"	
2006	NCIS	Ranger Bobbi Hendricks	Episode: "Ravenous"	
2006	House	Nicole Ballard	Episode: "All In"	
2006	Cold Case	Lorena "Lo" Kinney	Episode "The Hen House"	
2006	Saved	Jill Neuworth	Episode: "Triage"	
2005, 2008	The L Word	Mara Atwood, Lauren / Helen	2 episodes	
2007	Luna: Spirit of the Whale	Jane Kimball	Television film	
2008	The Capture of the Green River Killer	Julie Reichert	2 episodes	
2009	Wild Roses	Kate Henry	Main role; 13 episodes	
2009	Held Hostage	Rose	Television film	
2009	Fringe	Natalie Dancick	Episode: "Earthling"	
2009	V	Mary Faulkner	Episode: "A Bright New Day"	
2010	Supernatural	Dr. Erica Cartwright	Episode: "Sam, Interrupted"	
2010	Lying to Be Perfect	Lori DiGrigio	Television film	
2010	Eureka	Lily Morgan	Episode: "I'll Be Seeing You"	
2010	Stargate Universe	Rachel	Episode: "Visitation"	
2011	Normal	Linleigh Blackmore	Television film	
2011	Endgame	Beatrice Wychwood	Episode: "The Caffeine Hit"	
2012	Seattle Superstorm	Carolyn Gates	Television film	
2012	Emily Owens, M.D.	Jessica	Recurring role; 4 episodes	
2013	Survival Code	Alison Freemont	Television film	
2013	Tom Dick & Harriet	Harriet Fellows	Television film	
2013	Arctic Air	Delilah Fury	Episode: "Hell Hath No Fury	
2013	The Carpenter's Miracle	Sarah Quinn	Television film	
2013	The Mystery Cruise	Regan Reilly	Television film	
2014	Continuum	Diana Bolton	5 episodes	
2014	Mr. Miracle	Celeste	Television film	
2014	Only Human	Valerie	Television film	
2014–2023	The Flash	Nora Allen, Joan Williams, Speed Force	Recurring role; 29 episodes	
2015	Motive	Lisa Wyatt	Episode: "Frampton Comes Alive"	
2016	Murder, She Baked	Vanessa Quinn / Melanie Quinn	"Murder, She Baked: A Peach Cobbler Mystery"	
2017	The Magicians	Dr. Higgins	Episode: "Cheat Day"	
2017	Hailey Dean Mystery	Pam Finan	"Hailey Dean Mystery: Deadly Estate"	
2018	Take Two	Mads	Episode: "Take Two"	
2018	Garage Sale Mystery	Sandy	"Garage Sale Mystery: Picture a Murder"	
2018-2019	When Calls the Heart	Georgia Pardell	2 episodes	
2019	Morning Show Mysteries	Stacey Walker	"Morning Show Mysteries: Death by Design"	
2019	Darrow & Darrow	Lt. Sarah Lang	"Witness to Murder: A Darrow Mystery"	
2019	Aurora Teagarden Mysteries	Kelly Stevens	"Aurora Teagarden Mysteries: Heist and Seek"	
2020	The Christmas House	Kathleen	Television film	
2022	Big Sky River	Casey Elfman	Hallmark Movie	
2025	Family Law	Amy Bowman	Episode: "Take My Advice"	
