= The Sierra Jensen Series =

Teen book series by Robin Jones Gunn

The Sierra Jensen Series is a teen book series by Christian author Robin Jones Gunn. It is a companion series to Gunn's The Christy Miller series, as Sierra's character was introduced in the twelfth book of Christy's series.

== Novels in the series ==
1. Only You Sierra
2. In Your Dreams
3. Don't You Wish
4. Close Your Eyes
5. Without a Doubt
6. With This Ring
7. Open Your Heart
8. Time Will Tell
9. Now Picture This
10. Hold on Tight
11. Closer Than Ever
12. Take My Hand
13. Love Finds You In Sunset Beach, Hawaii
