= Robin Jones Gunn =

American writer

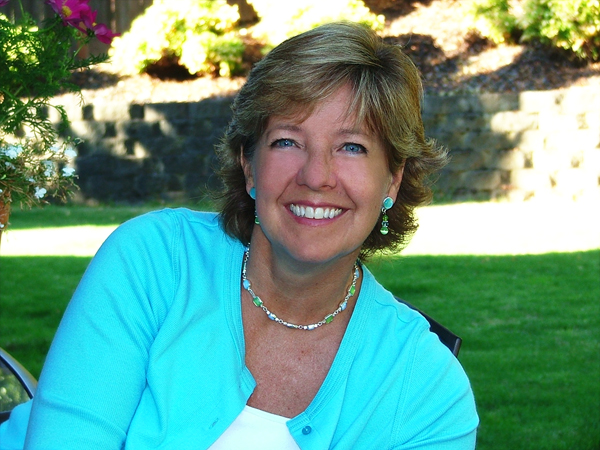
- Born: Wisconsin
- Occupation: Novelist
- Period: 1988–present
- Genre: Christian fiction
- Children: 2

Website
- www.robingunn.com

Robin Jones Gunn is the best-selling, award-winning Christian author of over 100 books, including the Christy Miller and Sierra Jensen series for teen girls as well as the Glenbrooke series and the Sisterchicks series. Robin's non-fiction titles are "Praying For Your Future Husband", "Spoken For" and "Victim of Grace". Her books have sold over 5.5 million copies worldwide. She is best known for the characters in the Christy Miller series that now continue in '"Christy &Todd: The College Years", "Christy & Todd: The Married Years", "Christy & Todd: The Baby Years" and the "Katie Weldon" series.

In 2007 she received the Christy Award for her novel "Sisterchicks in Gondolas".

In November 2016, a television film adaptation of the first two novels in her Christmas series, "Finding Father Christmas" and "Engaging Father Christmas", was broadcast on Hallmark Movies & Mysteries, as Finding Father Christmas, starring Erin Krakow and Niall Matter. At the time of broadcast, the film was both the highest rated and the most watched premiere in the network's history. Gunn also published an ebook ("How My Book Became A Movie:A True Story") detailing her experiences of the process, from the origins of the novel into the film's production. A sequel to the film, entitled Engaging Father Christmas was confirmed by Hallmark on May 9, 2017 and began filming in June 2017. The film premiered Hallmark Movies & Mysteries in November 2017. Gunn also appears as an extra in both films, alongside her agent. A third film in the series, entitled Marrying Father Christmas premiered on the channel on November 4, 2018.

== Personal life ==
Born in Wisconsin, Gunn moved to Southern California at age 5. She and her husband have two grown children and lived in Hawaii, though they now reside in California. Gunn serves on the Board of Directors for Media Associates International, a non-profit organization that provides training and encouragement for writers and publishers in difficult places of the world.
