= Danny Rahim =

British actor (born 1986)

- Born: 26 March 1986 (age 40); Hammersmith, London, UK
- Occupation: Actor
- Years active: 2009–present

Danny Rahim (born 26 March 1986) is a British actor who is best known for his work in the series Primeval: New World, a spin-off of the British series Primeval.

== Early years and career ==
Born in Hammersmith, London, trained and graduated at Manchester School of Theatre in Manchester. Rahim was guest star on the television series: Unforgiven, EastEnders, Young James Herriot and the movie Late Bloomers.

From 2012 to 2013, Rahim portrayed the lead character of Mac Rendell in the Space series Primeval: New World, a spin-off of the popular British series Primeval. On 21 February 2013, it was announced that the series had been cancelled after a single season.

== Filmography ==
Film and television
Title	Year	Role	Notes
Death in Paradise	2018	Finn Anderson	1 episode
Unforgiven	2009	Reece	1 episode
Olives with Your Tea	2011	Tom	Short
Late Bloomers	2011	Leon	
EastEnders	2011	Harpreet	
Young James Herriot	2011	Jagdeep Gakhal	3 episodes
Primeval: New World	2012–2013	Mac Rendell	13 episodes (main character)
Vera	2013	Nadim	1 episode
