= List of Arctic Air episodes =

Arctic Air is a Canadian drama television series that began airing on CBC Television on January 10, 2012.

On March 17, 2014, the series was canceled due to government budgetary cuts. In total, 35 episodes aired over the three seasons.

== Series overview ==
Season	Episodes	Originally aired	
Season	Episodes	First aired	Last aired
1	10	January 10, 2012	March 13, 2012
2	13	January 9, 2013	April 17, 2013
3	12	January 7, 2014	April 8, 2014

== Episodes ==
=== Season 1 (2012) ===
No. overall	No. in season	Title	Directed by	Written by	Original release date	Viewers (millions)
1	1	"Out of a Clear Blue Sky"	Paul Shapiro	Ian Weir	January 10, 2012	1.06
Bobby returns to Yellowknife; a dangerous storm forces Mel to ditch his plane.
2	2	"All In"	James Dunnison	James Phillips	January 17, 2012	0.89
Bobby gambles Mel's plane in a poker game; a DC-3 runs out of fuel at 5000 feet.
3	3	"Hijacked"	Mike Rohl	Bob Carney	January 24, 2012	1.07
An Arctic Air flight is hijacked while flying rig workers to Yellowknife.
4	4	"All the Vital Things"	Robert Lieberman	Sarah Dodd	January 31, 2012	0.89
Bobby lies to gain the trust of an elder.
5	5	"Northern Lights"	Anthony Atkins	Jordan Wheeler	February 7, 2012	N/A
Arctic Air may be involved in a drug overdose in a remote community.
6	6	"C-TVAK"	Mike Rohl	Penny Gummerson	February 14, 2012	N/A
Bobby puts Cece's life at risk to find out how his father died.
7	7	"Vancouver is Such a Screwed-Up City"	Stacey Stewart Curtis	Susin Nielsen	February 21, 2012	0.78
Bobby travels south with Mel and Krista to buy a new plane and his old life in Vancouver comes back to haunt him.
8	8	"The Professional"	Kevin Fair	Ian Weir	February 28, 2012	0.72
Lives are at a risk when a hitman comes to Yellowknife.
9	9	"New North"	James Dunnison	Ian Weir	March 6, 2012	0.66
Arctic Air gets more than it bargained for when Bobby convinces his high-rolling college roommate to invest in the company.
10	10	"Drop in for Lunch"	Gary Harvey	Sarah Dodd	March 13, 2012	0.96
A routine flight from Watson Lake to Yellowknife turns deadly.

=== Season 2 (2013) ===
No. overall	No. in season	Title	Directed by	Written by	Original release date	Viewers (millions)
11	1	"Wildfire"	Anthony Atkins	R.B. Carney	January 9, 2013	0.84
Bobby and Krista attempt to rescue a group of stranded tourists from a raging forest fire, but they need help from the rest of the Arctic Air crew if they're going to make it out alive.
12	2	"Bombs Away"	Anthony Atkins	Jordan Wheeler	January 16, 2013	N/A
Bobby's sister Deanna is arrested for eco-terrorist bombings, but as Bobby works to clear her name, he learns that there's one more bomb and it's been planted on an Arctic Air plane -- with Krista aboard.
13	3	"Open Season"	Gary Harvey	Penny E. Gummerson	January 23, 2013	N/A
Bobby and Caitlin fly to the northern hunting grounds, where they discover Nelson has been shot by the hunters he was sent there to guide.
14	4	"Stormy Weather"	Anne Wheeler	Sara Snow	January 30, 2013	N/A
Inclement weather traps Bobby, Krista, and Blake inside an abandoned radar station, where a hidden threat lurks.
15	5	"Old Wounds"	Gary Harvey	Ian Weir	February 6, 2013	N/A
Bobby makes a final bid to save his diamond claim by sponsoring Jim McAllister in a boxing match.
16	6	"Dangerous Cargo"	Anne Wheeler	Sarah Dodd	February 13, 2013	N/A
A biologist resorts to terrorism out of desperation, holding Krista and Bobby at gunpoint in the Arctic Air headquarters.
17	7	"There's Gold in Them Thar Hills"	Mike Rohl	R.B. Carney & Penny Gummerson	February 27, 2013	N/A
Arctic Air goes up against Bruce Ward and the Comstock Brothers when a dying trapper tells Dev and Cece the location of a gold claim.
18	8	"Secrets & Lies"	Neill Fearnley	Sarah Dodd	March 6, 2013	0.69
Petra suspects her ex-husband is behind Connor's disappearance, leading her to team with Bobby in search of them.
19	9	"Hell Hath No Fury"	Mike Rohl	Ian Weir	March 20, 2013	N/A
Bobby is tasked with reining in a troubled rock star during the northern leg of her comeback tour.
20	10	"Skeletons in the Closet"	Neill Fearnley	Larry Bambrick	March 27, 2013	N/A
Bobby and Mel are left stranded in an isolated community when their DC-3 is shot up on the airstrip.
21	11	"Blood Is Thicker Than Water"	Kevin Fair	Susan Nielsen	April 3, 2013	0.61
Krista's mother comes to town and turns her daughter's life upside down.
22	12	"Fool Me Once"	Amanda Tapping	Derek Thompson & Ian Weir	April 10, 2013	N/A
Blake's sister crashes a couples weekend in Calgary; where Krista learns Bobby and Petra kissed.
23	13	"Ts'inada"	Kevin Fair	R.B. Carney, Sara Snow & Jordan Wheeler	April 17, 2013	N/A
Kidnappers capture Caitlin, but instead of a ransom they demand a trade for Nelson.

=== Season 3 (2014) ===
No. overall	No. in season	Title	Directed by	Written by	Original release date	Viewers (millions)
24	1	"The River"	Gary Harvey	Ian Weir	January 7, 2014	N/A
Arctic Air launches a search and rescue operation for Dev and Astrid.
25	2	"High Water"	Gary Harvey	Jon Cooksey	January 14, 2014	N/A
Bobby, Deanna, along with the Indigenous community, and the rest of Arctic Air fights against time and politics to evacuate a community before an upstream dam bursts.
26	3	"The Fling"	Kevin Fair	Sarah Dodd	January 21, 2014	N/A
Krista and Tag’s relationship is tested when an emergency landing leaves them stranded. Meanwhile Blake and Dev land in hot water after Blake sleeps with the waitress named Isabella. Unaware that she is a married woman.
27	4	"The Finish Line"	Kevin Fair	Jon Cooksey & Derek Thompson	January 28, 2014	N/A
A high-stakes plane race raises ghosts from Mel’s past, forcing Krista and Tag to confront a crisis in their relationship.
28	5	"The Devils You Know"	Martin Wood	Susin Nielsen	February 4, 2014	N/A
Bobby fights to save Petra’s life savings when Bruce Ward’s involvement in a business deal causes violence and destruction.
29	6	"On the Edge"	Martin Wood	Penny E. Gummerson	February 25, 2014	N/A
Krista faces a grisly choice when her team attempts a life and death rescue.
30	7	"Flying Solo"	Anthony Atkins	Jordan Wheeler	March 4, 2014	N/A
Bobby and Loreen race to save Caitlin when her first solo flight goes dangerously wrong. While Tommy's life is in Jeopardy with Bruce Ward while saving Caitlin from crashing the airplane during a massive storm. At the same time Krista wins the rights to start her own search and rescue team.
31	8	"The Fugitive"	Anthony Atkins	Sarah Dodd & Derek Thompson	March 11, 2014	N/A
A prisoner transport becomes a life and death struggle for Blake and Lindsay, as Krista and Tag reach an impasse in their relationship.
32	9	"Rites of Passage"	Amanda Tapping	Penny E. Gummerson & Ian Weir	March 18, 2014	N/A
Bobby and Connor’s weekend on the land becomes a fight for survival, after Bobby falls in the ice while saving Connor. Connor tells Bobby that he ran off because the owner of the store accused him of stealing candy along with an indigenous woman who also got accused of stealing candy due to her being indigenous, while a high altitude flight puts Mel and Krista in peril.
33	10	"Last Drop"	Amanda Tapping	Sarah Dodd	March 25, 2014	N/A
Bobby blames Bruce Ward for his foster sister Desi's death in a dry community, as Blake and Lindsay pursue a murder suspect.
34	11	"The Fall - Part 1"	Gary Harvey	Jon Cooksey & Jordan Wheeler	April 1, 2014	N/A
Krista’s SAR crew is pushed to the limit during a high-altitude rescue, while Bobby is the target of an attack in YK thanks to Kimbo's death threat. Russ tries to reason with his brother but Kimbo doesn't want to hear it.
35	12	"The Fall - Part 2"	Gary Harvey	Jon Cooksey	April 8, 2014	N/A
When disaster strikes, Krista’s SAR team is trapped, and Tag clings to life on the mountain; Bobby and Mel race to save them.
