= Lini Evans =

Canadian singer and actress

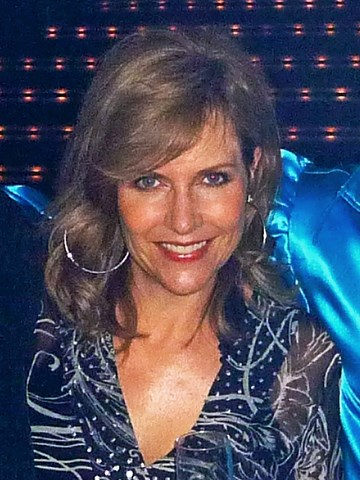
- Born: Calgary, Alberta, Canada
- Occupation: Entertainer
- Spouse: Ross Mitchell (married 2022–present)
- Website: www.linievans.com

Lini Evans (born in Calgary) is a Canadian entertainer. Evans has performed songs in multiple languages. She has described learning songs in unfamiliar languages by listening to them repeatedly to memorize the words and inflections.

A couple of noteworthy performances of Evans include singing her bilingual (Japanese-English) rendition of “The End of the World” in Season One, Episode Eight of The Man in the High Castle, and the finale duet of the "Our Chinese Heart" concert at Rogers Arena with Han Lei. Evans has also performed for the Chinese Premier Zhu Rongji, and Japanese royalty in Kobe. She has performed alongside well-known Asian pop titans including, Andy Lau, and A-Mei.

Evans portrayed Betty Logan, the mother to actress Lacey Chabert character in the television movie "The Tree That Saved Christmas". This movie became the highest-rated Up original movie of all-time (as of 2015) and was directed by David Winning.

== Filmography ==
Year	Title	Role	Notes
2010	Untold Stories of the E.R.	Mrs. Smith	Episode: "Death Breath"
2010	Smallville	Reporter	Episode "Luthor"
2011	Fairly Legal	Mrs. Gardner	Episode "Benched"
2011	Jake and Jasper: A Ferret Tale	Mrs. Tyler	Film
2012	Alcatraz	Annie Hastings	Episode: "Guy Hastings"
2012	Supernatural	Debra Harper	Episode: "Plucky Pennywhistle's Magical Menagerie"
2012	Untold Stories of the E.R.	Donna Jornlin	Episode: "Never Say Die"
2012	Health Nutz	Beatrice Woolawoo	Episode: "Beatrice Woolawoo"
2012	Arctic Air	TV Reporter	Episode: "The Professional"
2012	Do You Really Want to Know?	Mary-Lou Roder	Documentary
2012	Arrow	Business Suit	Episode: "Lone Gunmen"
2013	Health Nutz	Beatrice Woolawoo	Episode: "Juice, Jesus and Rock & Roll"
2013	Kill For Me	911 Operator	Film
2014	Kits	Ms. James	TV movie
2014–2015	Bates Motel	Amelia Martin	3 episodes
2014	The Talent	Susan	Episode: "Talented"
2014	The Tree That Saved Christmas	Betty Logan	TV movie (UP)
2014	Rush	Moderator	Episode: "You Spin Me Around"
2015	Love, Again	Brittany Hoffbrauer	TV movie (Hallmark)
2015	The Unauthorized Beverly Hills, 90210 Story	Candy Spelling	TV movie (Lifetime)
2015	The Man in the High Castle	Nightclub Singer	Season 1 Episode 8: "The End of the World"
2015	The Unauthorized Melrose Place Story	Candy Spelling	TV movie (Lifetime)
2016	Who Killed My Husband	Jean Howell	TV movie (Lifetime)
2016	Unleashing Mr. Darcy	Linda Scott	TV movie (Hallmark)
2016	Stop the Wedding	Belle	TV movie (Hallmark)
2016	Three Bedrooms, One Corpse: An Aurora Teagarden Mystery	Saleswoman	TV movie (Hallmark)
2017	Walking the Dog	Barb	TV movie (Hallmark)
2017	The Arrangement	Sue	TV series
2017	Harvest Love	Grace Gilson	TV movie (Hallmark)
2018	Marrying Mr. Darcy	Linda Scott	TV movie (Hallmark)
2018	Falling for You	Patty Hathaway	TV movie (Hallmark)
2019	Last Stand to Nowhere	Sadie Brown	Film
2019	Darrow & Darrow 4: Burden of Proof	Carol Morrison	TV movie (Hallmark)
2019	Christmas Unleashed	Bev Hutton	TV movie (Lifetime)
2020	Time For Us to Come Home For Christmas	Karen	TV movie (Hallmark Movies and Mysteries)
2021	Raise a Glass to Love	Lynn Savern	TV movie (Hallmark)
2021	Gingerbread Miracle	Vanessa Owens	TV movie (Hallmark)
2022–2024	Resident Alien	Bethany Bloom	2 episodes
