= Loch Ness Terror =

- DVD cover
- Written by: Jason Bourque; Paul Ziller
- Directed by: Paul Ziller
- Starring: Brian Krause; Niall Matter; Amber Borycki; Carrie Genzel; Don S. Davis
- Music by: Pinar Toprak
- Country of origin: Canada
- Original language: English

Production
- Producers: Lindsay MacAdam; Kirk Shaw
- Cinematography: Anthony C. Metchie
- Editor: Gordon Williams
- Running time: 91 minutes
- Production companies: Insight Film Studios; Lochness Production; CineTel Films

Original release
- Network: Sci-Fi Channel
- Release: 5 January 2008

Loch Ness Terror (titled Beyond Loch Ness on the Sci-Fi Channel) is a 2008 Canadian horror television film directed by Paul Ziller and written by Ziller and Jason Bourque.

== Plot ==
James Murphy is a rugged cryptozoologist who, thirty years earlier, during a trip to Loch Ness, Scotland, was attacked by the fabled "Nessie" creature that killed his father and research assistants, and left James with a deep facial scar. Currently, James is hunting for Nessie when his search leads him to the sleepy town of Ashburn, on Lake Superior. He encounters Josh Riley, owner of a bait shop. Josh's ex-girlfriend, Zoe, is going camping along with Brody and two others on Pike Island on the lake.

Josh's uncle, Sean, attempts to prove Nessie's existence but is eaten instead.

James hires Josh as a guide while his mother, Sheriff Karen Riley, eventually finds Sean's remains. She begins to suspect that an underwater predator is on the loose. The creature attacks and kills her deputy's sister as she returns from grocery shopping. When one of the campers disappears (after being eaten by the creature), the others are unable to escape and one is killed while Brody is injured.

Hearing about James, Karen warns him to stay away from Josh, but the pair still work together. They find a corpse and James takes the head before Karen's deputy, Neil Chapman, arrives. James reveals that Sean has contacted him prior about Nessie and, seeing the corpse, believes there might be a nest somewhere. Before the two set off, James is arrested, leaving Josh to go alone.

James manages to convince Karen that a 40-foot plesiosaurus is behind the killings, after they send a skin sample to the Zoological Institute on the mainland that matches no known species of reptile. Josh arrives on the island and encounters packs of baby plesiosaurs. He is rescued by Zoe and Brody and he leaves them at a magnetite mine for safety, not knowing it is the nest. Brody is killed by a pack of baby plesiosaurs. Sheriff Riley, Murphy and Deputy Neil Chapman spot Josh's flare and track the creature and her offspring to the magnetite mine on the island.

Sheriff Riley and Josh manage to kill some of the offspring, but Neil dies after running out of ammunition and being attacked by the babies. Josh lures Nessie away from Zoe and traps her in a container filled with magnetite. James stabs the creature with a cyanide-filled syringe, then helps Josh by getting him out of harm's way and throws his cigarette lighter into the container, igniting the explosive magnetite and destroying the creature and her remaining offspring. Josh and Zoe are reunited and Sheriff Riley asks if James will now start to "hunt for Bigfoot", to which he replies that he will instead probably find a nice small town to call home. Josh asks if he means Ashburn, to which he laughingly replies "yeah."

== Cast ==
- Brian Krause as James Murphy, rugged cryptozoologist, during a trip to Loch Ness, Scotland, had a fatal encounter with the fabled "Nessie" creature that killed his father, and left James with a deep facial scar.
  - Sam Laird as Young James Murphy
- Niall Matter as Josh Riley, Owner of a baitshop, and Zoe's former boyfriend.
- Amber Borycki as Zoe, Josh's ex-girlfriend and Brody's girlfriend.
- Carrie Genzel as Sheriff Karen Riley, The local sheriff, and Josh's mother.
- Don S. Davis as Neil Chapman, Sheriff Karen's deputy.
- Sebastian Gacki as Brody, Zoe's boyfriend, and Josh' nemesis.
- Neil Denis as Chad, One of the campers, later killed by Nessie.
- Serinda Swan as Caroleena, One of the campers, later killed by Nessie.
- Donnelly Rhodes as Uncle Sean, Josh's uncle. Later killed by Nessie
- Paul McGillion as Michael Murphy, James' father, who is killed by "Nessie".
- Alan Longair as Thomas Chapman
- Suzanne Ristic as Marge
- Rob Morton as Bill Maxwell
- David Lewis as Scientist #1
- Bart Anderson as Scientist #2
- R. Nelson Brown as Fisherman

== Production ==
The television film was produced by Lindsay MacAdam and Kirk Shaw for Insight Film Studios as Loch Ness Terror. It was financed by Sci Fi Channel and directed by Paul Ziller.

== Release ==
It aired on 5 January 2008 in the USA on the Sci-Fi TV channel and was released on 9 July 2008 in Canada on DVD.

== Soundtrack ==
The Turkish classic musician Pinar Toprak composed and performed the score.

== Reception ==
Dread Central said, "Yeah, it’s all hokey and formulaic, but somehow it still manages to be a monstrously good time. Loch Ness Terror delivers the rompin’, stomp’in, chomp’in monster mayhem previous prehistoric carnivorous lake monster movies like The Crater Lake Monster, Monstroid, The Loch Ness Horror, and a few years ago similarly titled Beneath Loch Ness failed to. Loch Ness Terror might be the best movie of its kind, though that’s not saying much."

CineMagazine rated the film 2 stars.

== See also ==
- Merlin and The Book of Beasts
- Abominable
- Yeti (film 2008)
- Beowulf & Grendel
