= Erin Krakow =

American actress (born 1984)

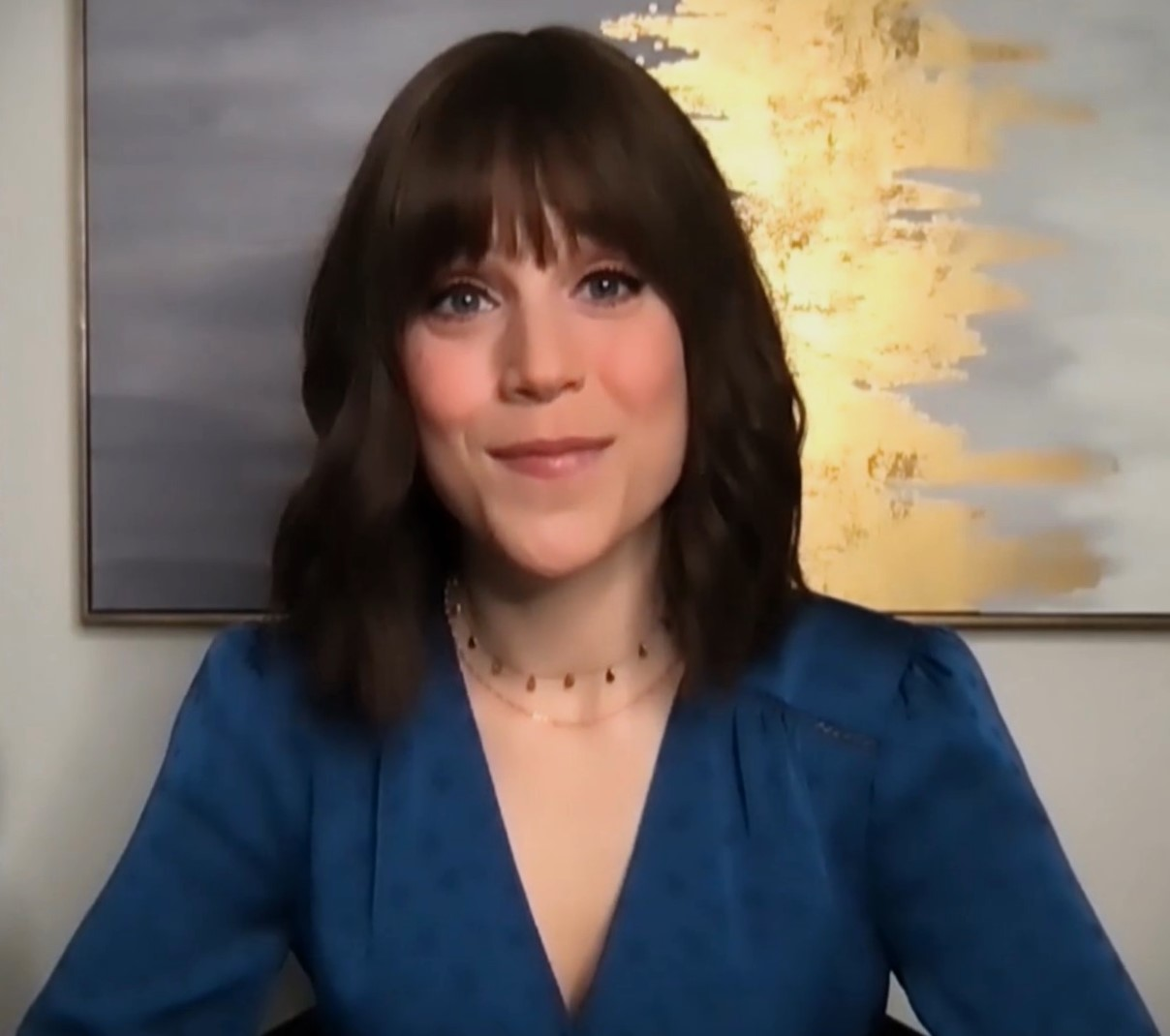
- Krakow in 2021
- Born: September 5, 1984 (age 42); Philadelphia, Pennsylvania, U.S.
- Education: Juilliard School (BFA)
- Occupations: Actress, producer
- Years active: 2010–present
- Spouse: Ben Rosenbaum (m. 2025)
- Children: 1

Erin Krakow (born September 5, 1984) is an American actress and producer. She appeared in the Lifetime TV series Army Wives, and stars as Elizabeth Thatcher in the Hallmark TV series When Calls the Heart.

== Early life ==
Erin Alisa Krakow was born on September 5, 1984 in Philadelphia, Pennsylvania. She later lived in Wellington, Florida, with her brother, Kyle Krakow, and her parents, Morgan Krakow and Dr. Elliott Krakow. She attended the Alexander W. Dreyfoos Jr School of the Arts in West Palm Beach, Florida. She studied drama at the Juilliard School in New York City, and began her acting career on stage, with roles in The Importance of Being Earnest, George the Fourth, and Steel Magnolias.

== Career ==
From 2010 to 2012, Krakow had the recurring role of Specialist Tanya Gabriel in the Lifetime television drama series Army Wives, playing a medic in Afghanistan. She later guest-starred on the crime-comedy-drama series Castle.

In 2014, Krakow began starring as the lead character in the Hallmark Channel drama series When Calls the Heart, alongside Australian born actor Daniel Lissing. She plays teacher Miss Elizabeth Thatcher, a role originated by Poppy Drayton in the movie that spawned the series.

Krakow starred in the 2016 Hallmark Movies & Mysteries film Finding Father Christmas. Adapted from the novels of Robin Jones Gunn, she starred alongside Niall Matter as Miranda Chester, a woman who visits a small Vermont town at Christmas time, looking for clues as to the identity of her father. At the time of broadcast, the film became the most watched premiere in the network's history. Hallmark announced a sequel to the film in May 2017. Filming for the sequel, entitled Engaging Father Christmas, took place in Vancouver in June 2017, with both Krakow and Matter reprising their roles. The film premiered on Hallmark Movies & Mysteries in November 2017. Krakow began filming a third installment in the series, entitled Marrying Father Christmas in March 2018. The film premiered in the USA on the Hallmark Movies & Mysteries channel on November 4, 2018, as part of their "Miracles of Christmas" seasonal programming.

== Personal life ==
On June 23, 2025, Krakow revealed on Instagram that she had married her co-star and long-time boyfriend Ben Rosenbaum. On November 26, 2025 the couple announced they are expecting their first baby. On June 23, 2026, the couple revealed to People magazine that they had welcomed their daughter in early April.

== Filmography ==
Year	Title	Role	Notes
2010–2012	Army Wives	Specialist Tanya Gabriel	Recurring role, 18 episodes
2013	Castle	Julie Rogers	Episode: "Recoil"
2014	Chance at Romance	Samantha Hart	Hallmark film
2014–present	When Calls the Heart	Elizabeth Thatcher-Thornton	Lead role; Also Executive Producer
2014	A Cookie Cutter Christmas	Christie Reynolds	Hallmark film
2015	NCIS: Los Angeles	Emily Moore	Episode: "Citadel"
2016	Good Girls Revolt	Maureen	Episode: "The Folo"
2016	Finding Father Christmas	Miranda Chester	Hallmark film
2017	NCIS	Elizabeth Dean	Episode: "Rendezvous"
2017	Engaging Father Christmas	Miranda Chester	Hallmark film: aka. A Family for the Holidays (Canada); Winter Wedding (UK)
2018	Marrying Father Christmas	Miranda Chester	Hallmark film: aka. Winter Wedding (Canada); We Wish You a Marry Christmas (UK)
2019	A Summer Romance	Samantha Walker	Hallmark film
2019	Sense, Sensibility & Snowmen	Ella Dashwood	Hallmark film
2021	It Was Always You	Elizabeth	Hallmark film
2023	The Wedding Cottage	Vanessa Doyle	Hallmark film
2024	Blind Date Book Club	Meg Tompkins	Hallmark film
2024	Santa Tell Me	Olivia	Hallmark film
2025	Christmas Above The Clouds	Ella Neezer	Hallmark film
