= Stop the Wedding =

2016 television film directed by Anne Wheeler

- Based on: Stop the Wedding by Stephanie Bond
- Written by: Nina Weinman
- Directed by: Anne Wheeler
- Starring: Rachel Boston; Niall Matter; Alan Thicke
- Composer: Peter Allen
- Countries of origin: United States; Canada
- Original language: English

Production
- Executive producers: Lisa Demberg; Jack Grossbart; Allen Lewis; Jon Maas; Michael Shepard; Juliet Smith; Marnie Young
- Producer: Harvey Kahn
- Production location: Vancouver, British Columbia
- Cinematography: Adam Sliwinski
- Editor: Lara Mazur
- Production company: Hallmark

Original release
- Network: Hallmark Channel
- Release: June 11, 2016

Stop the Wedding is a 2016 American-Canadian made for television romantic comedy film directed by Anne Wheeler and starring Rachel Boston, Niall Matter, Alan Thicke and Lini Evans. It is an adaptation of the novel of the same name by Stephanie Bond. The film was produced by the Hallmark Channel and premiered on their network in the United States on June 11, 2016, as part of their June wedding series. The film earned Anne Wheeler a 2017 Leo Award, in the Best Direction (Television Film) category.

== Plot ==
Career-oriented Anna Colton learns that her Aunt Belle has agreed to marry a multiple divorcee, suave actor Sean Castleberry, following a whirlwind romance. Anna is determined to stop the wedding from proceeding. Joining in her effort is Sean's handsome son, successful surgeon Dr. Clay Castleberry, and the pair work to prevent the nuptials, despite their mutual dislike of one another. Frustrated by their young relatives' efforts, Belle and Sean elope to Las Vegas in order to go through with their wedding. Regretting their previous obstructiveness, Anna and Clay rush to join their family members in order to celebrate their wedding, developing their own romantic feelings for one another along the way. However, a misunderstanding leads to Clay abandoning plans to attend the wedding and returns home, leaving Anna to desperately try to resolve their problems, reunite with Clay, and attend the wedding in support of her aunt.

== Cast ==
- Rachel Boston as Anna Colton
- Niall Matter as Clay Castleberry
- Alan Thicke as Sean Castleberry
- Lini Evans as Belle Colton
- Teryl Rothery as Suzie
- David Lewis as Jake
- Brenda Crichlow as Renee

== Development ==
=== Adaptation ===
Bond first wrote her novel "Stop the Wedding" in 1998, but it was repeatedly turned down by her publisher. In 2012 she made the decision to self-publish the book, and it became a bestseller. The book was picked up by an independent film producer, leading to Hallmark optioning it in 2014. The production marked the first time Hallmark adapted an independently published novel into a film.

=== Differences from the novel ===
In the novel the character of Belle Colton is the mother of Anna, whereas in the film, she is her maternal aunt.

== Filming ==
Filming took place in March and April 2016, in Vancouver, British Columbia.

== Broadcast ==
The film premiered on the Hallmark Channel of June 11, 2016, as part of the June Weddings Series.

== Awards ==
Year	Award	Category	Recipients	Outcome
2017	Leo Awards	Direction (Television Film)	Anne Wheeler	Won
2017	Leo Awards	Picture Editing (Television Film)	Lara Mazur	Nominated
