= Pressure (2002 film) =

- Film Poster
- Directed by: Richard Gale
- Screenplay by: Richard Gale and Craig Brewer
- Story by: Richard Gale
- Produced by: Carole Curb Nemoy; Mike Curb; Harvey Kahn; Glen Reynolds
- Starring: Kerr Smith; Lochlyn Munro; Angela Featherstone; Adrien Dorval; Michelle Harrison
- Cinematography: Curtis Petersen
- Edited by: Garry M.B. Smith
- Music by: Christopher Brady
- Production companies: Curb Entertainment; Front Street Productions; Front Street Pictures
- Distributed by: Curb Entertainment; DEJ Productions (United States); Multicom Entertainment Group (overseas)
- Release date: February 20, 2002 (United States)
- Running time: 90 minutes
- Country: United States
- Language: English

Pressure is a 2002 thriller film, starring Kerr Smith and Lochlyn Munro. It was co-written and directed by Richard Gale. The film was first shown at the American Film Market on February 20, 2002, before being released direct-to-video on November 26 of the said year, despite it being filmed in 2001.

== Plot ==
On their way back home, two friends decide to stop at a bar. Nevertheless, one of the friends is seduced by Amber, a local girl. However, the girl and her lover plan to rob him. The lover accidentally shot himself, allowing the friends to escape, but his father is the local sheriff and starts a manhunt to capture the friends.

== Cast ==
- Kerr Smith as Steve Hillman
- Lochlyn Munro as Patrick Fisher
- Angela Featherstone as Amber
- Adrien Dorval as Bo Cooper
- Michelle Harrison as Sara Laughlin
- Michael Kopsa as Agent Frank Gruning

== Reception ==
Pressure was nominated for one Leo Award in the category of "Feature Length Drama: Best Editing".
