= Hit 'n Strum =

- Directed by: Kirk Caouette
- Written by: Kirk Caouette
- Produced by: Kirk Caouette; John Cassini; Shawn McLaughlin; Jacqueline Nguyen
- Starring: Michelle Harrison; Kirk Caouette
- Cinematography: Pieter Stathis
- Edited by: Su Fraser
- Production company: 4Branch Productions
- Release dates: 31 March 2012 (Canadian Film Festival); 8 March 2013 (Canada)
- Running time: 91 minutes
- Country: Canada
- Language: English

Hit 'n Strum is a 2012 Canadian drama film directed by Kirk Caouette, starring Michelle Harrison and Kirk Caouette.

== Cast ==
- Michelle Harrison as Stephanie
- Kirk Caouette as Mike
- Paul McGillion as Christopher
- Marion Eisman as Stephanie's Mother
- Sean Allan as Stephanie's Father
- John Mann as Guitar Store Clerk
- Michael Kopsa as Physician

== Release ==
The film opened in theatres on 8 March 2013.

== Reception ==
Chris Knight of the National Post rated the film 2.5 stars out of 4, writing that "The plot may not quite measure up to the music, but taken together, they make a nice duet." Ken Eisner of The Georgia Straight called the film "goodhearted" and "beautifully shot".

Linda Barnard of the Toronto Star rated the film 2 stars out of 4 and wrote that "while the music is good and the scenery, thanks to cinematographer Pieter Stathis’s very capable camerawork, is gorgeous, the story often subs ploys for sympathy in place of inspiration." Liam Lacey of The Globe and Mail called the film a "technically competent but clumsily scripted drama about a legal princess and a musical pauper that loses momentum right after the initial collision."
