= Frozen in Love =

2018 television romantic drama film directed by Scott Smith

- Written by: Rick Garman
- Story by: Rachael Leigh Cook; Rick Garman
- Directed by: Scott Smith
- Starring: Rachael Leigh Cook; Niall Matter
- Countries of origin: United States; Canada

Production
- Producers: Jamie Goehring; Trevor McWhinney
- Cinematography: Ron Stannett
- Editor: Ron E. Yoshida
- Production companies: Muse Entertainment Production; Head First Productions

Original release
- Network: Hallmark Channel
- Release: January 13, 2018

Frozen in Love is a 2018 American-Canadian made for television romantic drama film directed by Scott Smith and starring Rachael Leigh Cook and Niall Matter. It was developed from an original idea by Cook. The film was produced by the Hallmark Channel and premiered on their network in the United States on January 13, 2018, as part of their 'Winterfest' season.

== Plot ==
Bookstore owner Mary Cartwright (Rachael Leigh Cook) is struggling to make ends meet in order to keep her bookstore open. Adam Clayborn (Niall Matter) is a hockey player who got booted from his third game due to a disagreement with the referee causing his hockey team's manager/ex-girlfriend Erica Parker (Tammy Gillis) to suspend him from the upcoming hockey games until further notice. Mary is given the opportunity to turn her fortunes round in the form of an image makeover, but must work with Adam Clayborn in return under the supervision of public relations worker Janet Dunleavy (Sandy Sidhu) who has connections with Erica. Can the two overcome their animosity, and mutual attraction, to improve both their images?

== Cast ==
- Rachael Leigh Cook as Mary Campbell
- Niall Matter as Adam Clayborn
- Madison Smith as Tyler Campbell
- Victor Zinck Jr. as Chuck Forman
- Tammy Gillis as Erica Parker
- Sandy Sidhu as Janet Dunleavy
- Jessie Fraser as Sarah Forman
- Sebastian Billingsley-Rodriguez as Graham Forman
- Mason McKenzie as Noah

== Development ==
The film was developed from an original idea by actress Rachael Leigh Cook, who also stars in the film. She had an idea for the plot several years previously, and realized that it could work as a Hallmark Channel project. Along with producer Jim Head, she pitched the idea to the channel in the summer of 2017, and they subsequently picked it up.

In November 2017, Hallmark announced four new original movies, including Frozen in Love, to be broadcast as a part of their 'Winterfest 2018' seasoning of programming in January 2018.

== Filming ==
Filming took place in British Columbia in November and December 2017, with location filming in Revelstoke downtown, the Revelstoke Forum, Grizzly Plaza and at Revelstoke Mountain Resort. Whilst the bookstore scenes were filmed on a specially built set, the library scenes were filmed in Maple Ridge Public Library.

== Broadcast ==
The film premiered on the Hallmark Channel on January 13, 2018, as part of their Winterfest season of programming.
