= Michael Kopsa =

Canadian actor (1956–2022)

- Born: January 22, 1956; Toronto, Ontario, Canada
- Died: October 23, 2022 (aged 66)
- Occupation: Actor
- Years active: 1979–2020
- Spouse(s): Lucia Frangione (m. ???-div. ???) (divorced, 1 child)
- Children: 1

Michael Kopsa (January 22, 1956 – October 23, 2022) was a Canadian actor, best known for his role as Char Aznable in the English dub of Mobile Suit Gundam, Commander Volcott O'Huey in Galaxy Angel, and Roger Baxter in Littlest Pet Shop.

== Career ==
Kopsa provided the voice of Char Aznable in the English dub of Mobile Suit Gundam and Commander Volcott O'Huey in Galaxy Angel. He also provided the voice of Beast in X-Men: Evolution. He provided the voice of Roger Baxter in Littlest Pet Shop, which would go on to become one of his most distinctive roles. He also appeared on the science fiction TV series Stargate SG-1 on several occasions, as well as The X-Files, The Net, and The Outer Limits. In the fourth and fifth season of Fringe, he played the recurring Observer villain Captain Windmark. Kopsa also appeared as Andrew McAndrick in Hallmark's series Finding Father Christmas, Engaging Father Christmas, and Marrying Father Christmas.

== Personal life and death ==
Kopsa was of Serbian descent through his father Milutin, an architect from Belgrade who emigrated to Canada in 1951. He was married to actress Lucia Frangione and they had one daughter Nora. On October 23, 2022, he died of complications from a brain tumor at the age of 66.

== Filmography ==
=== Anime ===
- Mobile Suit Gundam (1979–1980, TV series) – Char Aznable
- Mobile Suit Gundam: Char's Counterattack (1988) – Char Aznable
- Jin-Roh: The Wolf Brigade (1999) – Hajime Handa
- Galaxy Angel (2001, TV series) – Commander Volcott O'Huey
- Dragon Ball Z (2001–2003, TV series) – Yakon (Ocean Group Dub)
- MegaMan NT Warrior (2002, TV series) – LaserMan.EXE/Pharaohman.EXE
- Inuyasha (2003, 2006) – Goshinki, Byakko, Mezu
- Tetsujin 28-go (2005) – Professor Shikishima
- .hack//Roots (2006, TV series) – Ovan
- The Story of Saiunkoku (2006–2007, TV series) – The Narrator / Shoka Hong / Dr. To / Governor of Haku Province / Sa Family Member 2
- Death Note (2007, TV series) – Takeshi Ooi
- Mobile Suit Gundam 00 (2007–2008, TV series) – Aeolia Schenberg
- Ultraviolet: Code 044 – Sakuza / 6030
- Mobile Suit Gundam 00 the Movie: A Wakening of the Trailblazer (2010) – Aeolia Schenberg
- Black Lagoon: Roberta's Blood Trail (2010–2011, TV series) – Diego Jose San Fernando Lovelace

=== Animation ===
- Action Man (2000, TV Series) – Doctor X (new body)
- X-Men: Evolution (2001–2003, TV Series) – Henry "Hank" McCoy / Beast
- Dragon Booster (2004–2006, TV series) – Propheci / Reepyr
- Iron Man: Armored Adventures (2009–2012, TV series) – Controller
- Planet Hulk (2010, Movie) – Lavin Skee
- Ninjago (2011–2019, TV series) – Samukai / Vex
- Littlest Pet Shop (2012–2016, TV series) – Roger Baxter
- Slugterra (2013, TV series) – Brimstone
- Barbie in Princess Power (2015, television film) – Baron Von Ravendale

=== Video games ===
- Mobile Suit Gundam: Journey to Jaburo (2000) – Char Aznable (English dub)
- Mobile Suit Gundam: Zeonic Front (2001) – Char Aznable (English dub)
- Mobile Suit Gundam: Federation vs. Zeon (2001) – Char Aznable (English dub)
- Gundam Battle Assault 2 (2002) – Char Aznable (English dub)
- Mobile Suit Gundam: Encounters in Space (2003) – Char Aznable (English dub)
- Mobile Suit Gundam: Gundam vs. Zeta Gundam (2004) – Char Aznable (lines recycled from Federation vs. Zeon) (English dub)
- Dynasty Warriors: Gundam (2007) – Char Aznable / Quattro Bajeena (lines recycled for Dynasty Warriors: Gundam 2 and Dynasty Warriors: Gundam 3) (English dub)
- Warhammer 40,000: Dawn of War – Soulstorm (2008) – Missionary / Confessor Turgenum March / Asdrubael Vect
- Prototype (2009) – Additional voices

=== Film and television ===
A Rose For Christmas (2017) – Hallmark

- El Chavo del Ocho (1979, TV series) – Jaimito "El Cartero" (voice) (English dubbing)
- Timing (1985) – Steven
- Thirty Two Short Films About Glenn Gould (1993) – Broker #1
- Hard Core Logo (1996) – Mary's Husband
- Profile for Murder (1996) – Henry Mitchell
- The Outer Limits (1996–1999, TV series) – Curtis Sawyer / Commander Ivers / Detective Broder / Engineer
- The X-Files (1997, TV Series) – Rick Culver
- Dad's Week Off (1997, television movie) – Cop
- The Falling (1998) – Collins
- Seven Days (2000, TV series) – Colonel Kurtner
- Chain of Fools (2000) – Senator Dove
- The Proposal (2001) – Zack Mallette
- 3000 Miles to Graceland (2001) – Detective Jefferson
- Pressure (2002) – Agent Frank Gruning
- Carrie (2002, television movie) – John Hargensen
- The Barber (2002) – Father Stiffler
- Stealing Sinatra (2003) – Billy
- See Grace Fly (2003) – Dominic's Father
- Miracle (2004) – Bruce Norris
- The Survivors Club (2004, television movie) – Vinnie Pesaturo
- Dead Zone (2004–2006, TV series) – Voting Machines Fixer
- Fantastic Four (2005) – Ned Cecil
- Crossing (2007) – Latham Hopkins
- Watchmen (2009) – Paul Klein
- Love Happens (2009) – Unicom CEO
- Transparency (2010) – Dale
- Dear Mr. Gacy (2010) – FBI Agent
- Repeaters (2010) – Mr. Greeber
- Rise of the Planet of the Apes (2011) – Jerk Driver
- Apollo 18 (2011) – Deputy Secretary of Defense
- Earth's Final Hours (2011, television movie) – Lockman
- Hit 'n Strum (2012) – Physician
- Independence Daysaster (2012) – General Moore
- Fringe (2012–2013, TV series) – Captain Windmark
- Yellowhead (2013) – Doctor
- Garage Sale Mystery: All That Glitters (2014, television movie) – Martin Foley
- Big Eyes (2014) – NY Society Man My Boyfriend's Dogs (2014) Restaurant Co-Owner
- Lost Solace (2016) – Chuck
- All Yours (2016) – Charles
- Countdown (2016) – Makarov
- Hello Destroyer (2016) – Judge
- Come and Find Me (2016) – Rezart
- Finding Father Christmas (2016, television movie) – Andrew McKendrick
- Little Pink House (2017) – Howard Munson
- Engaging Father Christmas (2017, television movie) – Andrew McKendrick
- In the Vineyard (2017, television movie) – Charles Baldwin
- The Professor (2018) – Richard's Doctor
- Marrying Father Christmas (2018, television movie) – Andrew McKendrick
- Chronicle Mysteries (2019, television movie) – Miles Lewiston
- Promiseland (2019) – Vasily
- Love in Winterland (2020) – Tom Wilson
