= Father Christmas (film series) =

2016–2018 American/Canadian film series

- Erin Krakow and Niall Matter as Miranda and Ian in Finding Father Christmas
- Based on: Father Christmas series by Robin Jones Gunn
- Screenplay by: David Golden
- Directed by: Terry Ingram (1); David Winning (2,3)
- Starring: Erin Krakow; Niall Matter; Wendie Malick
- Countries of origin: United States; Canada
- Original language: English
- No. of episodes: 3 (list of episodes)

Production
- Executive producers: Ted Bauman; Libby Beers; Patricia Clifford
- Producer: Ted Bauman
- Cinematography: Ron Stannett (1); Anthony C. Metchie (2,3)
- Production companies: Father Xmas Films Inc. (1); Bauman Entertainment Inc. (2,3); EFC Films Inc. (2); MFC Films Inc. (3)

Original release
- Network: Hallmark Movies & Mysteries
- Release: November 13, 2016
- Release: November 12, 2017
- Release: November 4, 2018

The Father Christmas film series is an American/Canadian trilogy, starring Erin Krakow and Niall Matter, based on the novels of Robin Jones Gunn. The films were originally broadcast in the USA on Hallmark Movies & Mysteries, as part of the channels' "Miracles of Christmas" seasonal programming.

The films follow the story of Miranda Chester (Krakow), as she visits the cozy sundown town of Carlton Heath, Vermont, in search of the truth about her parentage. While there she meets, and falls in love with local lawyer/hotelier Ian McKendrick (Matter).

== Main cast ==
- A dark grey cell indicates the character was not in the film.

Character	Title		
Character	Finding Father Christmas	Engaging Father Christmas	Marrying Father Christmas
Miranda Chester	Erin Krakow	Erin Krakow	Erin Krakow
Ian McKendrick	Niall Matter	Niall Matter	Niall Matter
Margaret Whitcomb	Wendie Malick	Wendie Malick	Wendie Malick
Katherine McKendrick	P. Lynn Johnson	P. Lynn Johnson	P. Lynn Johnson
Andrew McKendrick	Michael Kopsa	Michael Kopsa	Michael Kopsa
Peter Whitcomb	Jim Thorburn	Jim Thorburn	Jim Thorburn
Ellie Whitcomb	Aliyah O'Brien	Aliyah O'Brien	Julia Benson
Julia Whitcomb	Macie Juiles	Nevis Unipan	Nevis Unipan
Mark Whitcomb	Callum Seagram Airlie	Callum Seagram Airlie	Callum Seagram Airlie
Annie Jacobs	Bethany Brown	Bethany Brown	

Author Robin Jones Gunn appears as an extra in theatre scenes in both Finding Father Christmas and Engaging Father Christmas.

== Production and filming ==
=== Adaptation ===
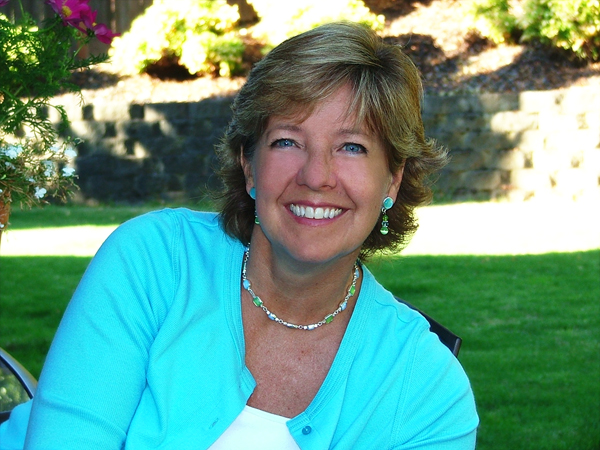
Author Robin Jones Gunn, whose novels were adapted for the film series

Gunn's literary agent was approached in 2011 by a production company looking for Christmas novels to adapt into screenplays. Her agent suggested the novel "Finding Father Christmas". On pitching the story to Hallmark Movies & Mysteries in 2012, it was rejected due its lack of romance. Gunn's agent then made the suggestion to combine the first novel with parts of its sequel, "Engaging Father Christmas", as the latter novel featured a romantic plot for its main character. The two novels were reworked into a combined treatment, which was again pitched to the channel in 2013. It was again rejected, but with the possibility of reconsideration if further adaptations were made, in particular relocating the novel from England to North America. Following further adaptations, Hallmark approved the treatment of the novels in 2015, leading to the development of the screenplay. Gunn went on to publish an ebook ("How My Book Became A Movie:A True Story") in 2016, detailing her experiences of the process, from the origins of the novel to the film's production.

=== Differences from the novel ===
The first film differs significantly from the novel. The setting is moved from England to Vermont, the character of Ian is introduced much earlier in the story and several character names were changed. A new introduction to the story was also written, to introduce important backstory. However, author Robin Jones Gunn felt that "the heart of the story I'd written was still there".

The second and third films diverged further from the original story, although author Gunn confirmed that the films still drew upon her novels.

=== Sequels ===
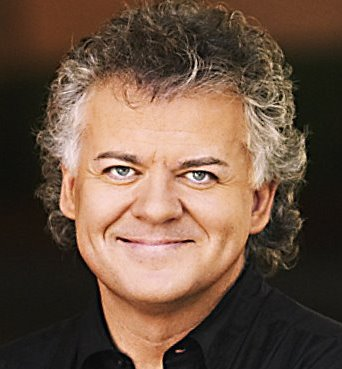
David Winning, who directed the second two films in the series

Following the success of the first film, star Niall Matter and author Robin Jones Gunn both confirmed in March 2017 that Hallmark were developing a sequel.

On May 9, 2017, Hallmark announced eight new Christmas movies, including a sequel to Finding Father Christmas entitled Engaging Father Christmas. Finding Father Christmas director Terry Ingram was originally approached to direct the sequel, but was unavailable, leading to director David Winning taking the helm. A third film in the series was confirmed by director David Winning and actor Jim Thorburn in interviews given in November 2017.

=== Filming ===
All three films were filmed in and around Vancouver, British Columbia. Filming for the first film took place in June 2016, with some scenes shot in the city of Abbotsford, British Columbia. The second film began production in June 2017 and the final installment was filmed in March 2018.

== Films ==
No.	Title	Directed by	Written by	Original release date
1	"Finding Father Christmas"	Terry Ingram	Robin Jones Gunn (novel), David Golden (teleplay)	November 13, 2016
Orphaned at a young age, Miranda Chester never knew her father. An unexpected discovery among her mother's belongings leads her to a clue to her father's identity, in the form of an old photograph. Determined to discover more about her past, Miranda sets off to the photo's location - a small town in Vermont. There she meets Ian, who endeavors to assist her in her quiet attempts to uncover the truth. The welcoming town, her growing romance with Ian and the possibility of impacting the lives of others as well as herself, leave Miranda with difficult choices to make as she begins to learn more.
2	"Engaging Father Christmas"	David Winning	Robin Jones Gunn (novel), David Golden (teleplay)	November 12, 2017
Miranda Chester returns to the small town of Carlton Heath to reunite with her newly discovered family, as well as boyfriend Ian. Whilst the Whitcomb's welcome her with open arms, matriarch Margaret, asks that Miranda keep the secret of her parentage between the family, in order to preserve the reputation of the late James Whitcomb. Embracing the traditional Christmas she never had as a child, alongside the prospect of a forthcoming proposal from Ian, Miranda has hopes for a wonderful Christmas. However, the receipt of an anonymous text message, threatening to expose her secret to the whole town, puts everything she has yearned for so deeply, at risk.
3	"Marrying Father Christmas"	David Winning	Robin Jones Gunn (novel), David Golden (teleplay)	November 4, 2018
Following their engagement the previous year, Miranda and Ian prepare to tie the knot in Carlton Heath, surrounded by family and friends. Whilst Margaret reconnects with an old friend in a surprising way, Miranda contends with the arrival of a mysterious visitor.

== Release ==
Finding Father Christmas premiered on the Hallmark Movies & Mysteries channel on November 13, 2016. It was subsequently broadcast on the channel a further twenty times in the lead up to Christmas, including broadcast on Christmas Day. The film was released on DVD in the United States in October 2017.

Engaging Father Christmas premiered in the United States on the Hallmark Movies & Mysteries channel on November 12, 2017, shown as a double bill with a rerun of Finding Father Christmas. In Canada, the film was broadcast on Super Channel under the title "A Family for the Holidays", and premiered on November 13, 2017. It premiered in the UK on Sky Cinema on November 28, 2017 under the title Winter Wedding. The film was released on DVD in the United States on October 2, 2018.

Marrying Father Christmas, the third film in the series, premiered in the USA on the Hallmark Movies & Mysteries channel on November 4, 2018, as part of their "Miracles of Christmas" seasonal programming. The film was released on DVD in the United States on October 1, 2019.

== Reception ==
At the time of broadcast, both Finding Father Christmas and Engaging Father Christmas were the highest rated and the most watched premieres in the network's history, with ratings of 1.56 million viewers and 1.84 million viewers respectively. The premiere of Marrying Father Christmas was watched live by 1.44 million viewers.
