= Primeval: New World =

Canadian science fiction television series (2012–2013)

- Genre: Science fiction Drama
- Created by: Judith and Garfield Reeves-Stevens
- Developed by: Gillian Horvath
- Starring: Niall Matter; Sara Canning; Danny Rahim; Crystal Lowe; Miranda Frigon; Geoff Gustafson; Andrew-Lee Potts
- Composer: Andrew Lockington
- Countries of origin: Canada; United Kingdom
- Original language: English
- No. of seasons: 1
- No. of episodes: 13

Production
- Executive producers: Katie Newman; Tim Haines; Michael Chechick; Gabriela Schonbach; Martin Wood; Gillian Horvath
- Running time: 42 minutes
- Production companies: Impossible Pictures; Omni Film Productions

Original release
- Network: Space (Canada); Watch (United Kingdom)
- Release: 29 October 2012 – 19 February 2013

Related
- Primeval

Primeval: New World is a science fiction television program, set in Vancouver, British Columbia, created by Judith and Garfield Reeves-Stevens. A co-production between Britain's Impossible Pictures and Canada's Omni Film Productions, for Space. The series is a spinoff of the British series Primeval. However, the two shows have little to do with each other. It was broadcast on Space in Canada, and on Watch in the United Kingdom. As with Primeval, the premise of Primeval: New World involves a team who has to deal with animals from the past and future that travel through time to the present day through anomalies. On 21 February 2013, it was announced that the series had been cancelled after a single season.

In February 2024, a licensed spinoff novel called Primeval: New World: The Ascent was announced. It was released on March 22, 2024, on the Kindle store with a paperback release on November 12 of that year.

== Plot ==
In the Primeval series, animals and people from the past and future travel through time to the present day via anomalies, fictional phenomena which act as portals through time. In Primeval: New World, set in Vancouver, British Columbia, anomalies begin opening in Canada. Evan Cross (Niall Matter), a software inventor who encountered an anomaly six years ago, creates the Special Projects Group to investigate the anomalies.

== Cast ==
Cast L-R: Geoff Gustafson, Miranda Frigon, Sara Canning, Niall Matter, Danny Rahim, Crystal Lowe

- Niall Matter as Evan Cross: an inventor specializing in software. Cross has been searching for anomalies after encountering an Albertosaurus six years prior to the start of the series. A lab in his company, Cross Photonics, is used as the team's base. Matter cited the action sequences as his reason for joining the show, and he performed many of the character's stunts himself.
- Sara Canning as Dylan Weir: a conservation officer and expert in predatory behaviour. Canning researched aspects of the role by contacting her aunt, a park ranger in New Brunswick, who was able to provide her with details on equipment and training for the character.
- Danny Rahim as Mac Rendell: an expert in firearms.
- Crystal Lowe as Toby Nance: the builder of the devices that track anomalies. In the episode "Babes in the Woods" It is revealed she is bisexual
- Miranda Frigon as Angelika Finch: the CFO of Cross Photonics.
- Geoff Gustafson as Lieutenant Ken Leeds: a Royal Canadian Air Force officer and the head of the government's Project Magnet.

In October 2011, Haines indicated that characters from Primeval could appear in some capacity, stating "We've only got one at the moment... We haven't worked that out". Space and Impossible Pictures jointly revealed the cast of the series in March 2012. Andrew-Lee Potts, who played Connor Temple in Primeval, reprises his role in the first and final episodes. Potts indicated his character would be used to tie the two series together, saying Connor appears to "rectify something that may have gone wrong, and to try prevent it getting worse." In addition to the main cast, numerous former Stargate franchise actors, including Lexa Doig, Louis Ferreira, and Dan Payne, were cast in various guest roles. Additionally Amanda Tapping directed three episodes. Niall Matter's former Eureka co-star Colin Ferguson guest-starred in one episode as a quirky scientist (basically switching the roles they previously played).

== Episodes ==
No.	Title	Directed by	Written by	Canadian air date	UK air date	UK viewers (millions)
1	"The New World"	Martin Wood	Judith and Garfield Reeves-Stevens	29 October 2012	8 January 2013	0.409
Anomalies appear in Stanley Park, and several people are killed when a Pteranodon and two Utahraptors appear in the present. Connor Temple travels to Vancouver and takes back an ARC device Evan Cross obtained six years ago when an Albertosaurus killed his wife, and his own life was saved by an anonymous ARC soldier. He warns Evan about the danger of working with the anomalies and changing history, and advises him to leave the anomalies alone. However further attacks and a missing child prompts Evan and his Special Projects Group to search for the creatures. Ange Finch contacts Lieutenant Ken Leeds, head of the government's secret and very small "Project Magnet", requesting his help.
2	"Sisiutl"	Andy Mikita	Judith and Garfield Reeves-Stevens	5 November 2012	15 January 2013	0.401
Lieutenant Leeds approaches Evan to offer his cooperation on the anomalies, but is rebuffed. Toby creates an anomaly detection system by hacking the local cell phone network, and immediately detects an anomaly near an oil tanker facility, where two researchers have been killed. Facing a psychological assessment, Dylan is approached by a cryptozoologist who shows her video of what he thinks is the inspiration for Sisiutl; a sea serpent from First Nations mythology. They encounter Evan and Mac at the anomaly, and discover that the creature is a Titanoboa. With the help of Detective Harlow, the Titanoboa is returned to its own time. Having missed her assessment, Dylan is offered a place on Evan's team.
3	"Fear of Flying"	Mike Rohl	Jon Cooksey	12 November 2012	22 January 2013	0.315
An anomaly opens at an airfield, and a descending cargo plane passes through it into the Jurassic period. Evan and Dylan venture into the anomaly in an attempt to save the occupants, while Mac stands guard outside in case any creatures pass through it. Though the pilots survived the crash the electronics did not, and while attempting to make repairs the pilot is killed by a swarm of beetles, whose hive the plane landed in. As Evan, Dylan, and the co-pilot attempt to finish the repairs from inside the plane, Mac and Sam, his girlfriend, battle with the hive's queen, who has flown through the anomaly into the present.
4	"Angry Birds"	Andy Mikita	Gillian Horvath	19 November 2012	29 January 2013	0.322
An anomaly opens in a deserted rail yard that is being used for a marijuana grow op. After giving some supplies to their courier, the cultivators discover a young bird among the plants; on the road, the courier is chased down and eaten by an adult. Toby convinces Evan to let her go with them to the anomaly so she can take scientific readings for her research. Evan and Dylan are first to the rail yard, and are taken captive by the cultivators. Dylan sees the bird and determines it to be a juvenile Titanis. As Mac and Toby's car hits one adult, another attacks Evan. The bird is distracted by Leeds and killed by Mac. The second adult kills one cultivator and then attacks the group. As Toby and Leeds track down the anomaly, Evan burns marijuana to fill a carriage with narcotic smoke and Dylan lures the adult inside, where it is knocked out by the fumes. At Cross Photonics, Evan agrees to work with Leeds on the anomalies. Though the adult Titanis were returned through the anomaly, Leeds secretly takes the juvenile.
5	"Undone"	Mike Rohl	Sarah Dodd	26 November 2012	5 February 2013	0.266
A student is chased by a creature at a university, barely managing to escape from the attack. At Cross Photonics, Toby discovers that an anomaly opened and closed on the campus half an hour previously. Evan, Dylan, Mac, and Toby search the campus and discover a female Lycaenops in the library. When the creature is tranqualized, Evan, Dylan, and Sam transport it to Cross Photonics while Mac and Toby stay on campus. The anomaly reopens and a male Lycaenops ventures through before it closes again. When the female revives and attacks Sam, Mac and Toby return to Cross Photonics to find that she has been killed. Mac decides to kill the Lycaenops, against Evan's pleas. As they search for the creature they realize that the male has tracked the female's scent and entered the building. As Mac chases the male, Toby realizes that she is being stalked by the female. Dylan shoots the creature in mid-leap, and Mac kills the male when it arrives at the female's body.
6	"Clean Up on Aisle Three"	Amanda Tapping	Peter Hume	3 December 2012	12 February 2013	0.205
A security guard on the night watch at a Canadian Tire is killed when a pack of Daemonosaurus travels through an anomaly. Evan, Dylan, and Mac break into the store and search for the creatures. In their attempts to trap them it becomes apparent that the Daemonosaurus are more intelligent than expected, and their radios, guns, and flashlights are stolen by them. Dylan deduces that they are attracted to shiny objects and following the orders of the alpha male. Armed with hockey sticks they search for the pack's makeshift nest. Angelika decides to accept a job offer from another company. Lieutenant Leeds informs her that the government's resources will soon be available to the Special Projects Group. In a call with his superior, he is warned not to mess up.
7	"Babes in the Woods"	Andy Mikita	Katherine Collins	10 December 2012	19 February 2013	N/A
An anomaly opens in the woods near a cabin where Toby used to model, and a photographer is killed by a dinosaur. When they learn of the anomaly, the team goes to investigate, along with Ange, who has decided to stay because of the change in her relationship with Evan. Mac, Toby and her ex-girlfriend, Natalie are chased by the dinosaur, an Ornitholestes, and soon Evan, Dylan and Ange manage to taser it. While searching for the Anomaly to put the creature back through, both groups are stalked by a second Ornitholestes, which they eventually force back through.
8	"Truth"	Amanda Tapping	Gillian Horvath	17 December 2012	26 February 2013	0.159
A Pachycephalosaurus roams the harbourfront. Dylan and Mac quickly tranquilize the creature, but before it passes out, it sneezes on Evan. Returning to Cross Photonics, they leave the job of returning the Pachycephalosaurus through the anomaly to Leeds. Evan begins to hallucinate and believes that the Albertosaurus that killed his wife has returned. Triggering the evacuation code he hunts for the creature, ignoring Dylan and Toby's attempts to make him see sense. Mac, attempting to keep an eye on Evan, finds the frozen ARC soldier in storage, and that it is in fact an alternate version of him who saved Evan six years earlier. Ange manages to get close enough to Evan while he hallucinates that she is Brooke to transquillise him.
9	"Breakthrough"	Andy Mikita	Judy and Garfield Reeves-Stevens	22 January 2013	5 March 2013	0.155
While their anomaly detector is still offline from the damage Evan caused, the team discovers footage of a Triceratops on the internet, which leads Evan and Dylan to the home of Evan’s old rival, Howard Kanan. Meanwhile, preferring to avoid Evan in light of his recent discovery, Mac helps Toby to discredit the footage of the Triceratops since Leed's new assistant at Project Magnet is far from helpful. Dylan works with Leeds and his men to keep the Triceratops distracted while Evan and Kanan work to fix the handheld detector, in the process figuring out a way to measure how long an Anomaly will last. However when they send the Triceratops back through the anomaly, Kanan follows with the detector before it closes.
10	"The Great Escape"	Amanda Tapping	Dennis Heaton	29 January 2013	12 March 2013	0.163
The Titanis previously taken by Leeds escapes into the city. Dylan receives a phone call from Detective Harlow informing her of a potential creature attack. Arriving at the site, Evan and Dylan follow the tracks and discover the Titanis scavenging in a dumpster. The bird is scared off by the arrival of Major Douglas, who tells them not to interfere. Evan and Dylan head to Project Magnet and confront Leeds, who explains that he took the bird as proof for his superiors. Unaware of the escape, or the invasive research performed on the Titanis, Leeds offers them his assistance. Evan downloads the GPS data for the bird from Leeds' computer terminal and locates it at the Thunderbird Arena. As the military evacuates the building, Evan and Dylan sneak inside and search for the Titanis, setting up a GPS decoy on Dylan's phone. As the search progresses, two servicemen are killed and the Titanis badly wounded. Unable to save its life, Dylan resolves to euthanize it, but she is halted by Major Douglas. Douglas is tranquilized by Leeds and Dylan shoots the Titanis. Leeds is arrested by the military but leaves his Project Magnet passkey in his car for Evan.
11	"The Inquisition"	Martin Wood	Jon Cooksey	5 February 2013	19 March 2013	0.179
While Lieutenant Leeds is interrogated by his superior, Colonel Hall, Evan and his team track down the location of the lab to which Leeds has been taking captured dinosaurs; realizing that the military will be closing in on them, Evan has Toby relocate the anomaly detector. Evan is arrested and taken to the facility where Leeds is being held, while Mac and Dylan break in using the keycard left to them by Leeds. Here, Evan discovers the Colonel's motive; while Evan wishes to preserve the timeline, the Colonel intends to use the anomalies to prevent disasters in the present and future, such as global warming, by "seeding" points in the past with technology. Although Evan is initially uncooperative, Mac and Dylan are discovered on the facility and, seeing no way out, Evan agrees to work for the military, and gives them the rights to any new technology he will develop. With the group released and Leeds returned to his incarceration, Mac finally comes to terms with the alteration to his timeline, and the group bury the alternate Mac that Evan had stored in the freezer.
12	"The Sound of Thunder (Part I)"	Martin Wood	Gillian Horvath, Katherine Collins, and Peter Hume	12 February 2013	26 March 2013	0.180
13	"The Sound of Thunder (Part II)"	Martin Wood	Gillian Horvath and Katherine Collins	19 February 2013	2 April 2013	0.201
Connor Temple enters an anomaly in London to rescue a colleague chased by an Albertosaurus, and arrives in the spaghetti junction. Spotting Dylan's visual aid, Connor enters the anomaly to the time period in which Evan is trapped, and meets Dylan, who has returned from delivering the Brontoscorpio's tail that is used to cure Toby. Evan realizes the Albertosaurus is the one that killed his wife, and the trio enter Cross Photonics in the past to find the ARC team member. When they return, Colonel Hall has his men tranquilize the dinosaur, seemingly in violation of the original timeline, and Evan knows he has until the anomaly closes to repair it. Connor returns to his time, and the Albertosaurus escapes, rampages, and kills Hall. As Evan, Dylan, and Mac push the Albertosaurus back to Cross Photonics in the past, they realize that with the original Mac erased from the timeline, there is no one to rescue Evan in the past; Mac enters the anomaly, albeit with a different uniform, and rescues Evan once more in the past. When the Albertosaurus re-emerges from Cross Photonics into the Junction, Evan shoots the dinosaur dead, its rampage in the past complete, but the anomalies begin to disappear one by one. As Dylan and Evan realize something must have changed, they dash towards the anomaly to their present.

== Production ==
=== Development ===
Rumours of a Primeval spin-off date originated in June 2009 when, in an interview with Digital Spy, co-creator Tim Haines said "We're working on [a spin-off] with people in Canada". On 15 September 2011, Bell Media announced that Primeval: New World had been commissioned for Space as a co-production between Omni Film Productions and Impossible Pictures, stating "The series... will build on the UK Primeval mythology, taking place in the same universe that we've come to know and love. The story will centre on a new Canadian team of animal experts taking on whatever past or future creatures come through the anomalies that are now appearing around the world." Omni, Space, and Impossible Pictures collaborated for two-and-a-half years before announcing the series.

Primeval: New World was created by Judith and Garfield Reeves-Stevens. Haines is signed on as an executive producer, as are Sanctuary contributors Martin Wood and Gillian Horvath. 13 episodes were commissioned for the first series. Katie Newman of Impossible Pictures stated the tone will be "older, darker and scarier" than the original. Haines envisaged some crossover with Primeval but stated that the storyline would be mostly self-contained, describing it as a spin-off in the vein of CSI: Crime Scene Investigation. Corrie Coe, the senior vice-president of independent production at Bell, called it "a parallel yet independent series". In their press release, Bell Media said the "story and character development will move between the two series, uniting different plotlines."

=== Casting ===
Niall Matter and Sara Canning were announced as the leads for the show in March 2012. In July 2012 it was confirmed that Matter's Eureka alum Colin Ferguson and Lexa Doig would appear as guest stars in the series, with Louis Ferreira and Dan Payne also to appear in the series. It was also confirmed that Andrew-Lee Potts would reprise his role as Connor Temple from the original Primeval series.

=== Filming and effects ===
Filming was scheduled to begin in Vancouver in late 2011, but did not get underway until 7 March 2012. The majority of filming took place in urban areas outside of the city; locations included Stanley Park, Granville Island, B.C. Place Stadium, and the Britannia Beach mines. Impossible Pictures began work on the scripts in October 2011. Final drafts were written by Horvath, Wood, Peter Hume, Jon Cooksey, Sarah Dodd, Katherine Collins, and Judith and Garfield Reeves-Stevens, with Wood, Amanda Tapping, Andy Mikita, and Mike Rohl signed on to direct. Filming for the first series concluded on 18 July 2012. The Bridge Studios served as the show's production centre.

While the computer-generated images for Primeval were created by Framestore and The Mill, the effects for Primeval: New World were done by the Vancouver-based company Atmosphere Visual Effects. Gabriela Schonbach of Omni said "Vancouver is the creative hub of visual effects for television, and we are the beneficiaries of a huge pool of talent in every area of TV production." Models for sixteen different species, including Pteranodon, Titanoboa, Daemonosaurus, Titanis, and Pachycephalosaurus, were created for the series. To simulate the creatures during filming, the effects team used a mixture of people and props to convey their locations to the actors; for the Pteranodon sequence in Stanley Park in the first episode, a man holding a stick with a tennis ball attached was used to give them an indication of the creature's size. Each episode contained over 70 computer-generated images. Visual effects supervisor Mark Savela noted the success of Steven Spielberg's Jurassic Park franchise had caused challenges in creating "a fresh spin on dinosaurs". The introductory sequence and titles were created by Vancouver-based The Sequence Group. To develop it The Sequence Group took inspiration from the concept of the anomalies, intermixing them with shots of the cast, and creatures from the first episode.

=== Cancellation ===
On 21 February 2013, The Hollywood Reporter reported that Primeval: New World had been cancelled after a single season. Low ratings for the series caused Space and Bell Media to decide against renewing the show for a second season.

== Promotion ==
A 2-minute trailer for the series was released online in September 2012. Two Mobile apps, developed by the Calgary, Alberta company Robots and Pencils, were created for the iPhone and iPad. Primeval: dFX inserts creatures from the series into the user's video clips; Primeval: New World functions as a mobile game, with the user playing as a character from the series in the goal of keeping Vancouver safe from creature attacks.

== Broadcast ==
The Canadian television channel Space is lead broadcaster for Primeval: New World, with episodes shown online following the cable premiere. Ztélé will broadcast the series to French Canada. In the United Kingdom, the series will be broadcast on Watch from 8 January 2013. Syfy acquired basic cable rights for a June 2013 premiere in the United States, with Hulu taking video on demand rights for the territory. NRJ 12 will broadcast the series in France. The international distribution rights are held by Entertainment One.

== Home video release ==
The complete series was released on a 3-disc DVD set in the UK (region 2) on 1 April 2013. It was later released in North America (region 1) on 22 October 2013 on both DVD and Blu-ray.

== Books ==
In 2024, a media tie-in novel based on the show called Primeval: New World - The Ascent is scheduled to be released by author Julian Michael Carver.

== Reception ==
=== Critical response ===
Den of Geek columnist Philip Lickley enjoyed the first episode, stating that while it was "a little shallower" than Primeval, the ending "[sets up] what could be the most exciting element of the series." He noted several references to the original series, including the handheld anomaly detector and a cryogenically frozen Anomaly Research Centre member, as particular highlights. Alex Strachan of the Postmedia News agency had a favourable impression, praising the visual effects and describing the episode as "watchable and entertaining, the modern-day equivalent of '60s sci-fi TV classics like Voyage to the Bottom of the Sea and Time Tunnel."

=== Awards ===
Year	Award	Category	Recipients	Outcome
2013	Leo Awards	Best Lead Performance - male	Niall Matter	Nominated
2013	Leo Awards	Best Supporting Performance - female	Miranda Frigon	Nominated
2013	Leo Awards	Best Screenwriting	Jon Cooksey, "The Inquisition"	Nominated
2013	Leo Awards	Best Screenwriting	Judith Reeves-Stevens and Garfield Reeves-Stevens, "Breakthrough"	Nominated
2013	Leo Awards	Best Visual Effects	Mark Savela, Andrew Karr, Craig Vanden Biggelaar, Adam de Bosch Kemper, Brandon Hines, "Sound of Thunder Part 2"	Nominated
2013	Leo Awards	Best Picture Editing	Gordon Rempel, "Sound of Thunder Part 2"	Nominated
2013	Constellation Awards	Best Male Performance in a Sci-Fi TV Episode	Niall Matter, "Truth"	Won
2013	Constellation Awards	Best Sci-Fi TV Series	Primeval: New World	Nominated
2013	Constellation Awards	Outstanding Canadian Contribution to Sci-Fi Film or TV	Judith Reeves-Stevens and Garfield Reeves-Stevens (producers)	Won
2014	Canadian Screen Awards	Best Visual Effects	Adam de Bosch Kemper, Andrew Karr, Brandon Hines, Craig Van Den Biggelaar, Jeremy Kehler, Lawren Bancroft-Wilson, Louis Leung, Mark Savela, Toby Taplin and Tom Archer, "Angry Birds"	Nominated
