= Niall Matter =

Canadian-American actor (born 1980)

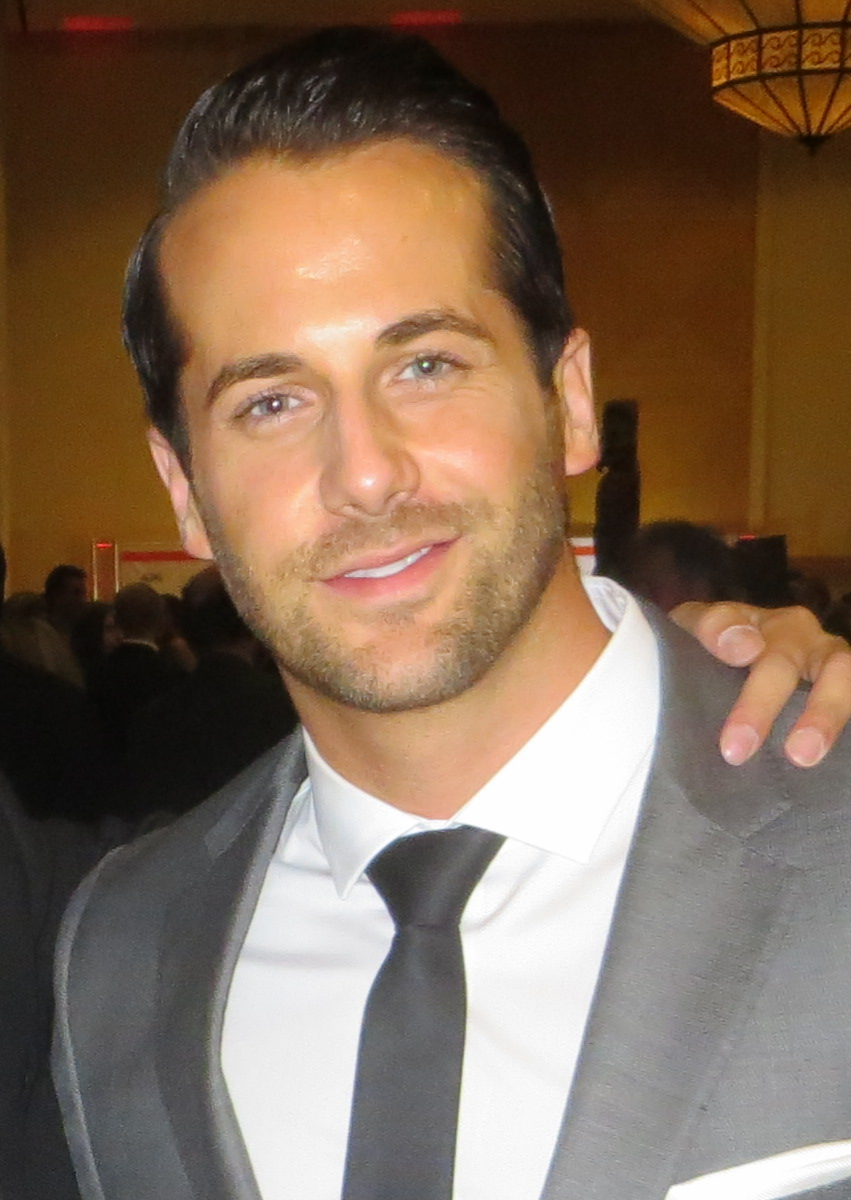
- Matter at the Leo Awards in July 2013
- Born: October 20, 1980 (age 45); Edmonton, Alberta, Canada
- Citizenship: Canada; United States
- Occupation: Actor
- Years active: 2007–present
- Spouse: Sara Bradley (m. 2016)
- Children: 2

Niall Matter (/ˈnaɪl ˈmeɪtər/ NYLE MAY-tər; born October 20, 1980) is a Canadian-American actor. Following recovery from a serious accident sustained while working on an oil rig, Matter chose to pursue a full-time acting career. He received his first significant break in 2007, with a main role in teen drama The Best Years. Later in the same year, he joined the cast of Eureka as bad-boy genius Zane Donovan. In 2009 he had a small supporting role in Zack Snyder's film Watchmen. He went on to star as Evan Cross in the short-lived 2012 series Primeval: New World. His career subsequently moved away from science fiction, seeing him star in several television movies, as well as joining Canadian series such as Remedy, Arctic Air and When Calls the Heart.

== Early life ==
Born in Edmonton, Alberta, of Irish and Russian descent, Matter grew up on his parents' dairy farm. He is a third-generation oil rigger, having worked on the oil rigs in Northern Alberta for eight years. On the recommendation of a school teacher, he enrolled in drama classes at age thirteen, going on to win the Best Actor prize at a provincial drama championship in 1999. However, after getting himself in trouble at age 17, his parents sent him for a three-month stint on the oil rigs to work with his grandfather. He has acknowledged that it was this experience that helped him to focus on his studies and pass his high school exams. He continued to work on the oil rigs alongside his grandfather and brother Trevor until the age of 25, while simultaneously moving to Vancouver and attending Vancouver Film School in pursuit of his long-term goal of an acting career.

At the age of 25 Matter had a serious accident while working on the oil rigs, where he was nearly crushed inside the cab of a 17-ton drilling rig. His quad muscle had been detached from his femur, and he nearly lost his right leg. It took six months for him to be fully rehabilitated, having to go through extensive physiotherapy to fully regain his ability to walk. On returning to the oil rigs, he witnessed another accident in which a man lost both his legs. This convinced him that it was time to move on, so he quit, returning to Vancouver, where he lied his way into a bartending job before landing his first acting role.

== Career ==
Matter landed his first professional acting job in 2007 playing the lead role of bait shop owner Josh Riley in the Syfy original film Loch Ness Terror, (broadcast as Beyond Loch Ness), which also starred Brian Krause and Don S. Davis. While filming Loch Ness he sent an audition tape to the producers of The Best Years which led to him gaining the main cast role of bartender, and cocaine addict, Trent Hamilton in the series's first season. He went on to play the role of USAF airman Lieutenant Kemp in a two-episode guest spot on the Syfy television series Stargate Atlantis.

He subsequently auditioned for the Syfy series Eureka, for what he understood was a one-episode guest star role. By his own admission, he took risks in the audition, playing the character as more flirtatious than he was written. The risks paid off, and he was cast in the role of bad boy genius Zane Donovan, first appearing in the season two episode "E=MC...?". The character would go on to develop a romantic relationship with the town's Deputy Sheriff Jo Lupo played by Erica Cerra. His role was recurring throughout seasons two and three. Season four saw a soft reboot of the show - following a time-traveling incident, the characters return to an alternate timeline, with character dynamics and relationships shifting. This led to Matter's role as Zane being expanded as he became part of the main cast, which continued through to the show's fifth and final season.

During this time, he also had guest roles on Warehouse 13, portraying one half of a married couple alongside Eureka castmate Cerra and on NBC's Fear Itself, playing a lovelorn zombie. In 2009/2010, Matter appeared as a recurring guest star on The CW shows Melrose Place (as record producer Rick) and 90210 as Greg, a teacher and subsequent love interest to Erin Silver.

In 2009, Matter played a small role in Zack Snyder's Watchmen film, portraying one of the Minute Men, Byron Lewis/Mothman. He also appeared in the short film accompanying the 'ultimate cut' DVD release of the film entitled Under the Hood, a faux documentary on the Minute Men.

From 2012 to 2013, Matter played the lead character of Evan Cross, a millionaire inventor searching for anomalies following the brutal killing of his wife by an Albertosaurus, in Space's science fiction series Primeval: New World, a spin-off of the British series Primeval. In 2013, this role earned him a Constellation Award in the Best Male Performance in a Science Fiction Television Episode category, for his performance in the episode "Truth". He was also nominated for a Leo Award in the Best Lead Performance by a Male in a Dramatic Series category, for the same episode. Due to low ratings, the series was not renewed for a second season.

In March 2014, Deadline Hollywood announced that he had landed the role of Lieutenant Graden Hales in the TNT commissioned pilot of Marcia Clark's Guilt by Association alongside Julia Stiles, which TNT ultimately declined to pick up.

He subsequently appeared in guest roles in various American and Canadian series. In CTV's Motive he played a man driven to murder in revenge for his sister's death; in the short-lived NBC series Constantine he played a father struggling to deal with the supernatural and in the TNT police procedural Rizzoli and Isles he portrayed a Detective turned murderer. He also had a recurring role in the third season of the CBC series Arctic Air as Tag Cummins, the love interest of the series female protagonist, Krista Ivarson, portrayed by Pascale Hutton. Additionally, Matter appeared in the 'VIP Lounge' online content produced to accompany the show, which was available through the series page on the CBC website.

Matter appeared in the 2014 Calgary International Film Festival's closing gala film, dark-comedy/thriller Ally Was Screaming. He was nominated for a 2015 AMPIA Rosie Award, for his role as Andrew, the abusive estranged husband of the titular Ally. In November 2014 he was announced as one of the Whistler Film Festival's Rising Stars, a program designed to promote the next generation of Western Canadian actors poised for international careers. He also attended the festival's screening of Ally Was Screaming, alongside his castmates.

Matter joined the main cast of Global's medical drama Remedy in 2015, for its second season. He played the role of ER Resident Dr Peter Cutler, who develops a romantic relationship with surgeon Dr Melissa Connor, portrayed by Matter's Primeval: New World castmate Sara Canning.

In 2016, he guest starred in two episodes of Bravo's Girlfriends' Guide to Divorce as seedy artist Joaquin. In the same year, he starred as surgeon Dr Clay Castleberry in the Hallmark Channel original movie Stop the Wedding, which was adapted from the novel of the same name by Stephanie Bond. The film's director Anne Wheeler went on to win Best Direction (Television Movie) at the 2017 Leo Awards. He subsequently starred in the W Network film A Snow Capped Christmas, (broadcast as Falling for Christmas in the US on Up), as former ice-hockey player and single father, Luke.

2016 also saw Matter star alongside Erin Krakow in the Hallmark Movies & Mysteries film Finding Father Christmas, based on the novel by Robin Jones Gunn, as local lawyer/hotelier Ian McAndrick. At the time of broadcast, the film became the most watched premier in the network's history. Matter and Krakow reprised their roles in a sequel to the film, entitled Engaging Father Christmas (broadcast as A Family for the Holidays in Canada and as Winter Wedding in the UK) which premiered on Hallmark Movies & Mysteries in November 2017.

He appeared in the 2016 Canadian wrestling-comedy film Chokeslam as Tab Hennessy, wrestling manager and boyfriend to the film's protagonist, Sheena 'Smasheena' DeWilde, portrayed by Amanda Crew. Matter attended the film's premiere at the Calgary International Film Festival on October 2, 2016 alongside his castmates. The film won four awards at the 2017 AMPIA Rosie Awards, including Best Director for Robert Cuffley.

Matter attended the 2nd annual "Hearties Family Reunion" in December 2016, where it was confirmed he would join the cast of the Hallmark Channel series When Calls the Heart for its fourth season, which began airing in January 2017. First appearing in the episode "The Heart of the Community", he portrayed Shane Cantrell, a single father struggling to connect with his son, who later begins a tentative relationship with Faith Carter (Andrea Brooks).

2017 saw Matter make guest appearances in two CW dramas. In May he appeared in the season three episode of iZombie, "Some Like it Hot Mess", playing the role of nightclub owner Sage Denning. The episode was directed by his Remedy castmate Enrico Colantoni. In November he made an appearance on the channel's long-running series Supernatural, in an episode of the show's thirteenth season, entitled "The Big Empty", playing the character of sadistic shape-shifter, Buddy.

In October of the same year, Matter appeared in an episode of the first season of ABC medical drama The Good Doctor. Based on the South Korean series of the same name, the drama follows the life of autistic-savant surgeon Shaun Murphy (Freddie Highmore). Matter appeared in the episode "Pipes", playing the role of Mark Allen, an expectant father facing life and death decisions over surgery on his unborn child.

In late 2017, Matter filmed the role of ice-hockey player Adam in the Hallmark Channel television film Frozen in Love, which was broadcast in January 2018, as a part of the channel's annual 'Winterfest' programming. The film was developed from an original idea by Matter's co-star, actress Rachael Leigh Cook. Filming took place in British Columbia in November and December 2017. Matter went on to win a Leo Award in the "Best Lead Performance Male, Television Movie" category for his performance in the film.

2018 saw Matter star in the Hallmark Channel original movie Love at First Dance as former 'Most Eligible Bachelor' Eric alongside dance instructor Hope, (Becca Tobin), which was broadcast as part of the channel's annual 'June Weddings' event. In July of the same year, Matter starred as college professor Nick Miller in the Hallmark Movies & Mysteries franchise the Aurora Teagarden Mysteries, which star Candace Cameron Bure, in an installment entitled The Disappearing Game. He went on to reprise the role in eight further films in the series, broadcast between 2019 and 2021.

July 2018 also saw Matter appear in an episode of the first season of ABC series Take Two, guest starring along with Seamus Dever. The pair played brothers in the episode entitled "Death Becomes Him". He went on to play a supporting role in the 2018 feature film The Predator, which was released in September 2018.

Matter reprised the role of Ian McAndrick in a third film in the Hallmark Movies & Mysteries 'Father Christmas' series, entitled Marrying Father Christmas filmed in March 2018 in Vancouver, British Columbia, again costarring Erin Krakow and directed by David Winning. The film premiered in the USA on the Hallmark Movies & Mysteries channel on November 4, 2018, as part of their "Miracles of Christmas" seasonal programming. In the same year he starred in the Lifetime original movie Christmas Pen Pals alongside Sarah Drew and Michael Gross, which aired on the channel on December 15, 2018, as part of their "It's a Wonderful Lifetime" seasonal programming.

In 2019, Matter was cast in the Hallmark Channel television film Country at Heart, alongside Jessy Schram, as songwriter Grady Parker. The film aired in October 2020 as part of the Channel's "Fall Harvest" seasonal programming. In August, he joined the cast of Hallmark Channel television film Christmas at Dollywood alongside Danica Mckellar and Dolly Parton. Matter played the role of entertainment director Luke Hakman. The film premiered on the channel on December 8, 2019.

In November 2020, Matter starred in the Hallmark Channel film Never Kiss a Man in a Christmas Sweater, alongside Ashley Williams. The film aired as part of the Channel's annual "Countdown to Christmas" programming.

== Personal life ==
Matter has previously dated Graceland star Serinda Swan, with whom he remains friends.

In July 2016, he married his girlfriend Sara Bradley in a private ceremony in Hawaii. The couple have two children. Their first child was born in 2016 and their second in 2018.

He is a longtime fan of the NHL team Edmonton Oilers.

== Filmography ==
=== Film ===
Year	Title	Role	Notes
2008	Dr. Dolittle: Tail to the Chief	Cole Fletcher	Direct-to-video
2009	Watchmen	Byron Lewis/Mothman	
2010	Dawna	Pimp	Short film
2011	Exley	George Wilson	
2014	Ally Was Screaming	Andrew	Nominated - 2015 AMPIA Rosie Award Best Performance by an Alberta Actor
2016	Chokeslam	Tab Hennessey	
2018	The Predator	Sapir	
2023	Double Life	Mark Setter	

=== Television ===
Year	Title	Role	Notes
2007	The Best Years	Trent Hamilton	Main role (season 1)
2007–2008	Stargate Atlantis	Lt. Kemp	Episodes (season 4): "Tabula Rasa", "Be All My Sins Remember'd"
2007–2012	Eureka	Zane Donovan	Recurring role (season 2) main role (seasons 3–5)
2008	Loch Ness Terror	Josh Riley	Television film; aka. Beyond Loch Ness
2008	Fear Itself	Eddie	Episode (season 1): "New Year's Day"
2008	Secrets of the Summer House	Peter Hughes	Television film
2009	Warehouse 13	Gary Whitman	Episode (season 1): "Duped"
2009–2010	Melrose Place	Rick Paxton	Recurring role (season 1)
2011–2012	90210	Greg	Recurring role (season 4)
2012–2013	Primeval: New World	Evan Cross	Main role Won – 2013 Constellation Award Best Male Performance in a Sci-Fi TV Episode - "Truth"; Nominated – 2013 Leo Award Best Lead Performance by a Male in a Dramatic Series - "Truth"
2014	Honor Student	Nicholas Howarth	Television film
2014	Arctic Air	Tag Cummins	Recurring role (season 3)
2014	Motive	Damian Cutter	Episode (season 2): "Overboard"
2014	Constantine	Darrell	Episode (season 1): "The Rage of Caliban"
2015	Remedy	Dr. Peter Cutler	Main role (season 2)
2015	Rizzoli & Isles	Detective Mike Guthrie	Episode (season 5): "In Plain View"
2016	Stop the Wedding	Clay Castleberry	Television film
2016	Finding Father Christmas	Ian McAndrick	Television film
2016	A Snow Capped Christmas	Luke	Television film; aka. Falling for Christmas (USA)
2016	Girlfriends' Guide to Divorce	Joaquin	Episodes (season 2): "Rule #14: No Means... No", "Rule #79: Labels Are for Canned Goods"
2017	When Calls the Heart	Shane Cantrell	Recurring role (season 4)
2017	iZombie	Sage Denning	Episode (season 3): "Some Like it Hot Mess"
2017	The Good Doctor	Mark Allen	Episode (season 1): "Pipes"
2017	Supernatural	Buddy	Episode (season 13): "The Big Empty"
2017	Engaging Father Christmas	Ian McAndrick	Television film: aka A Family for the Holidays (Canada); Winter Wedding (UK)
2018	Frozen in Love	Adam Clayborn	Television film Won - 2019 Leo Award Best Lead Performance Male Television Movie
2018	Love at First Dance	Eric	Television film
2018	Take Two	Hugh Garlin	Episode (season 1): "Death Becomes Him"
2018	Aurora Teagarden Mysteries: The Disappearing Game	Nick Miller	Television film
2018	Marrying Father Christmas	Ian McAndrick	Television film: aka Winter Wedding (Canada)
2018	Christmas Pen Pals	Sam	Television film
2019	Aurora Teagarden Mysteries: A Game of Cat and Mouse	Nick Miller	Television film
2019	Aurora Teagarden Mysteries: An Inheritance to Die For	Nick Miller	Television film
2019	Aurora Teagarden Mysteries: A Very Foul Play	Nick Miller	Television film
2019	Christmas at Dollywood	Luke Hakman	Television film
2020	Aurora Teagarden Mysteries: Heist and Seek	Nick Miller	Television film
2020	Country At Heart	Grady Connor	Television film
2020	Aurora Teagarden Mysteries: Reunited and It Feels So Deadly	Nick Miller	Television film
2020	Never Kiss a Man in a Christmas Sweater	Lucas Cavelli	Television film
2021	Aurora Teagarden: How to Con a Con	Nick Miller	Television film
2021	Aurora Teagarden: Til Death Do Us Part	Nick Miller	Television film Nominated - 2022 Canadian Screen Awards Best Lead Actor, TV Movie,
2021	Aurora Teagarden: Honeymoon, Honeymurder	Nick Miller	Television film
2021	Christmas Together With You	Steve	Television film
2022	Aurora Teagarden: Haunted By Murder	Nick Miller	Television film
2022	Magnum P.I.	Cole Vaughn	Episode: "Remember Me Tomorrow"
2022	Rip In Time	Rip Van Winkle, Jr.	Television film Nominated - 2023 Leo Awards Best Lead Performance by a Male in a Television Movie
2022	The Secrets of Bella Vista	Damhnaic McAuley	Television film Nominated - 2022 People's Choice Awards Favourite Hallmark Star
2022	When I Think of Christmas	Josh Hartman	Television film
2023	Family History Mysteries: Buried Past	Jackson	Television film: aka Finding Dad: A Family History Mystery; Nominated - 2024 Canadian Screen Awards Best Performance in a television film or mini-series
2023	Come Fly With Me	Paul	Television film
2023	The Santa Summit	DJ Ginger Jeff	Television film (uncredited cameo)
2023	Holiday Hotline	Jack	Television film
2024	This Time Each Year	Kevin	Television film
2024	Christmas Under the Lights	Jerry	Television film (cameo)
2025	Sight Unseen	Tim Darrow	Episode (season 2): "About a Boy"
2025	Providence Falls: An Impossible Promise	Bael	Television film
2025	Providence Falls: Thief of Fate	Bael	Television film
2025	We Met in December	Dave	Television film
2026	Much About Love	Benny	Television Film

=== Web series ===
Year	Title	Role
2014	Arctic Air – VIP Lounge	Tag Cummins
