= Arctic Air =

Canadian rural airline drama TV series (2012–2014)

- Genre: Drama
- Created by: Ian Weir
- Starring: Adam Beach; Pascale Hutton; Carmen Moore; Kevin McNulty; Timothy Webber; John Reardon; Emilie Ullerup; Stephen Lobo; Adam DiMarco; Sera-Lys McArthur; Tanaya Beatty; Brian Markinson; Leah Gibson; Jaren Brandt Bartlett; Aleks Paunovic; Rebecca Marshall; Niall Matter
- Theme music composer: Tim McCauley
- Country of origin: Canada
- Original language: English
- No. of seasons: 3
- No. of episodes: 35 (list of episodes)

Production
- Executive producers: Michael Chechik; Gabriela Schonbach; Ian Weir; Gary Harvey
- Production company: Omnifilm Entertainment

Original release
- Network: CBC Television
- Release: January 10, 2012 – April 8, 2014

Arctic Air is a Canadian drama television series that began airing on CBC Television on January 10, 2012. The series was canceled on March 17, 2014, due to government budgetary cuts.

== Synopsis ==
Arctic Air is about a Yellowknife-based maverick airline and the unconventional family who runs it. The owners are Mel Ivarson, an old school bush pilot; Krista Ivarson, Mel's daughter; and Bobby Martin, the son of Ivarson's deceased partner. Episodes focus on interpersonal conflicts between the characters as well as dramatic flying missions with their aging fleet of Douglas DC-3s, de Havilland Canada Beavers and other aircraft. Each episode has one or more flying missions.

== Cast ==
- Adam Beach as Bobby Martin
- Pascale Hutton as Krista Ivarson
- Kevin McNulty as Mel Ivarson
- Stephen Lobo as Dev Panwar
- Carmen Moore as Loreen Cassway
- John Reardon as Blake Laviolette
- Emilie Ullerup as Astrid Poulsen
- Timothy Webber as Cece Cooper
- Rebecca Marshall as Lindsay Gallagher
- Tanaya Beatty as Caitlin Janvier
- Niall Matter as Tag Cummins

== Episodes ==
Season	Episodes	Originally aired	
Season	Episodes	First aired	Last aired
1	10	January 10, 2012	March 13, 2012
2	13	January 9, 2013	April 17, 2013
3	12	January 7, 2014	April 8, 2014

== Productions ==
In some episodes, the production crew used Buffalo Airways' hangar in Yellowknife as backdrop.

== DVD releases ==
Entertainment One released the complete first season on DVD in Canada on November 20, 2012. Season 2 was released on January 7, 2014. The third and final season was released on October 14, 2014.

== Ratings ==
According to CBC, the total audience for the first episode was just over 1 million viewers.

Season	Timeslot (ET)	Episodes	Premiered		Ended		TV Season	Viewers (millions)
Season	Timeslot (ET)	Episodes	Date	Viewers (millions)	Date	Viewers (millions)	TV Season	Viewers (millions)
1	Tuesday 9:00pm	10	January 10, 2012	1.06	March 13, 2012	0.96	2011–12	0.96
2	Wednesday 9:00pm	13	January 9, 2013	0.84	April 17, 2013	N/A	2012–13	N/A
3	Tuesday 9:00pm	12	January 7, 2014	N/A	April 8, 2014	N/A	2013–14	N/A

== Awards and nominations ==
=== Canadian Screen Awards ===
Year	Category	Nominee	Result	Ref
2013	Best Dramatic Series	Ian Weir, Gabriela Schonbach, Gary Harvey, Michael Chechik	Nominated	
2014	Best Cross-Platform Project, Fiction - Arctic Air Extended Season Finale	Chris Waind, Fergus Heywood, Gary Harvey, Nataline Rodrigues, Nick McAnulty	Nominated	
2015	Best Performance by an Actor in a Continuing Leading Dramatic Role	Adam Beach	Nominated	

=== Leo Awards ===
Year	Category	Nominee	Result	Ref
2012	Best Dramatic Series	Michael Chechik, Gabriela Schonbach, Gary Harvey, Ian Weir	Nominated	
2012	Best Screenwriting in a Dramatic Series	Susin Nielsen	Won	
2012	Best Picture Editing in a Dramatic Series	Lara Mazur	Nominated	
2012	Best Guest Performance by a Male in a Dramatic Series	Bradley Stryker	Nominated	
2012	Best Guest Performance by a Male in a Dramatic Series	Luke Camilleri	Nominated	
2012	Best Supporting Performance by a Male in a Dramatic Series	Timothy Webber	Nominated	
2012	Best Supporting Performance by a Male in a Dramatic Series	Stephen Lobo	Nominated	
2012	Best Supporting Performance by a Female in a Dramatic Series	Carmen Moore	Nominated	
2012	Best Supporting Performance by a Female in a Dramatic Series	Emilie Ullerup	Nominated	
2013	Best Dramatic Series	Gabriela Schonbach, Michael Chechik, Gary Harvey, Ian Weir, Robert Carney, Ian Hay	Nominated	
2013	Best Screenwriting in a Dramatic Series	Ian Weir	Nominated	
2013	Best Screenwriting in a Dramatic Series	Sarah Dodd	Nominated	
2013	Best Picture Editing in a Dramatic Series	Franco Pante	Nominated	
2013	Best Casting in a Dramatic Series	Corinne Clarke, Jennifer Page	Nominated	
2013	Best Guest Performance by a Male in a Dramatic Series	Aleks Paunovic	Nominated	
2013	Best Guest Performance by a Female in a Dramatic Series	Michelle Thrush	Won	
2013	Best Guest Performance by a Female in a Dramatic Series	Chelah Horsdal	Nominated	
2013	Best Guest Performance by a Female in a Dramatic Series	Lexa Doig	Nominated	
2013	Best Supporting Performance by a Male in a Dramatic Series	Timothy Webber	Nominated	
2013	Best Supporting Performance by a Male in a Dramatic Series	Stephen Lobo	Nominated	
2013	Best Supporting Performance by a Female in a Dramatic Series	Emilie Ullerup	Nominated	
2013	Best Lead Performance by a Male in a Dramatic Series	Kevin McNulty	Nominated	
2013	Best Lead Performance by a Female in a Dramatic Series	Pascale Hutton	Nominated	
2015	Best Visual Effects in a Dramatic Series	John Gajdecki, Mike Leeming, Carlos Federico, Guzman Roman, Max Schroeder, Richard Greenwood	Nominated	

=== UBCP/ACTRA Awards ===
Year	Category	Nominee	Result	Ref
2013	Best Actress	Pascale Hutton	Nominated	
2013	Best Actress	Emilie Ullerup	Nominated	
2014	Best Actress	Pascale Hutton	Nominated	

== Supporting content ==
=== Mini-episodes ===
CBC Television released 5 mini-episodes online, titled Man of the North as supporting material to the first season of the series. These webisodes were each 2–3 minutes in length.

=== Online games ===
In support of the show's second season, an online game was launched on its official website, entitled Arctic Air Adventure.

=== Season 2 Finale ===
A series of short clips, available exclusively through the series page on the CBC website, were produced to complement the second-season finale. This online content was nominated for a Canadian Screen Award, in the Best Cross Platform Project, Fiction, category.

=== VIP Lounge ===
For the third series of the show, additional content was provided through the show's page on the CBC website, which included additional scenes, and supporting material such as photographs taken by characters, phone conversations and additional graphics related to each episode.

== See also ==
- Ice Pilots NWT, a documentary reality TV show about Buffalo Airways
- Flying Wild Alaska, a documentary reality TV show about a bush airline in Alaska
