= Auricle =

Auricle, auricula or auricula may refer to:

- Auricle (anatomy), the external portion of the ear
- Auricle, former name of the atrium of the heart; still used to describe this chamber in some other animals
- Auricle (botany), an ear-like projection on the base of a leaf or petal
- Auricles, ear-like projections at the base of the head of a planarium
- Primula auricula, or auricula, a species of flowering plant
- Auricula, a genus of extinct trilobites
- Auricle Ensemble, a Scottish chamber music group
- HMS Auricula, the name of two Royal Navy ships
- 1231 Auricula, an asteroid

== See also ==
- Auricular (disambiguation)
- Oracle (disambiguation)
- Auriculectomy, surgical removal of the ear
- Auricular branch (disambiguation)
- Auricular muscles, surrounding the ear
- Auriculariales, an order of fungi
- Auricularia, a genus of fungi
- Auriculella, a genus of tropical land snails
