= Batman: Death in the Family =

American animated interactive film

- Blu-ray cover
- Directed by: Brandon Vietti
- Written by: Brandon Vietti
- Based on: Characters from DC
- Produced by: Brandon Vietti; Amy McKenna
- Starring: Bruce Greenwood; Vincent Martella; John DiMaggio
- Edited by: Bob Ehrenreich; Cris Mertens
- Music by: Christopher Drake
- Production companies: Warner Bros. Animation; DC Entertainment
- Distributed by: Warner Bros. Home Entertainment
- Release date: October 13, 2020
- Running time: 18-30 minutes (Note: The digital non-interactive version includes four story paths that total 96 minutes.)
- Language: English

Batman: Death in the Family (or DC Showcase: Batman: Death in the Family) is a 2020 American adult animated interactive superhero film that explores alternate outcomes of the 1988 comics storyline "A Death in the Family", in which Jason Todd, the second character to bear the mantle of Batman's sidekick Robin, was murdered by the Joker. Produced, written, and directed by Brandon Vietti, the voice cast includes Bruce Greenwood, Vincent Martella, and John DiMaggio. It is a spiritual successor to Batman: Under the Red Hood (2010), and was released on Blu-ray on October 13, 2020.

== Format ==
Batman: Death in the Family is an interactive film in the physical media version, serving as a tie-in to Batman: Under the Red Hood (2010). When presented with a choice point, the user has ten seconds to make a choice, or a default decision is made for them. The interactive approach is inspired by the poll from the original comic in which readers could determine whether Jason survived or was killed by the Joker. The film has at least nine alternate story paths (two paths lead to the same or similar conclusion), with seven alternate endings, with each path an estimated 10 to 20 minutes each. However, in the digital version, the interactive element is absent, and instead presents four distinct story paths; "Under the Red Hood: Reloaded" (the canon prequel to Under the Red Hood), "Jason Todd's Rebellion", "Robin's Revenge" and "Red Hood's Reckoning".

== Plot ==
Believing that Jason Todd is becoming too aggressive in his crime-fighting, Batman decides to suspend him from his active duties as Robin; angered, Jason forsakes Batman and leaves Gotham City. The two reunite in Bosnia to fight the Joker and Ra's al Ghul, who are working together to steal uranium to create radioactive dirty bombs. As Batman stops Ra's al Ghul's men, the Joker captures Robin and brutally beats him with a crowbar, leaving him to die in a warehouse that is rigged to explode.

=== Robin Dies ===
If Robin dies, the events of Batman: Under the Red Hood play out naturally. A guilt-ridden Ra's al Ghul uses the Lazarus Pit to resurrect Jason, who becomes the Red Hood and wages a war against Batman and Black Mask, eventually leading to Black Mask releasing Joker from Arkham Asylum. Red Hood captures the Joker and forces Batman to decide between killing the Joker or him. Batman manages to avoid killing either of them, but Red Hood disappears. Bruce provides a recap of the events to Clark Kent, who commends Bruce for his bravery in facing his inner demons and offers his help in finding Jason.

=== Robin Cheats Death ===
Jason survives the explosion but is severely injured, requiring his face to be swathed in bandages. He is also severely traumatized, and he blames Batman for his plight. He dons a new Robin suit while keeping the bandages on his head and becomes a violent vigilante who brutally murders several Gotham criminals, such as Cheetah, the Riddler, and Black Mask. He is eventually found by Talia al Ghul, who offers to help him find and kill the Joker in exchange for Jason agreeing to raise her and Bruce's infant son Damian. Jason agrees, secretly planning to eventually turn Damian against his parents.

=== Batman Saves Robin ===
Unlike the other two options, this version offers multiple branching paths. Batman manages to get Robin out of the warehouse, but he is killed in the explosion. With his dying words, Bruce attempts to convince Jason not to take revenge on the Joker and to be strong for his family. Jason, Alfred, and Barbara Gordon put Bruce to rest next to his parents, and Dick Grayson succeeds him as Batman. The viewer then has to decide whether Jason chooses to kill the Joker.

==== Kill the Joker ====
Jason goes to a local diner and sees a news report about Batman. A man sitting next to him figures out that it is not the same Batman and is likely Nightwing pretending to be him. When prompted by Jason, the man claims to have known Batman and fought alongside him, but is now a new man and is attempting to start his life over. Reminiscing, he tells Jason a joke he once told Batman, leading Jason to realize it's the same joke from when Barbara Gordon was shot in the spine and that the man is a reforming Joker. Jason reveals his identity by repeating the parting words the Joker said to him back in the warehouse, making the Joker excitedly grin in realization before Jason stabs and kills him. Shortly afterwards, two GCPD police officers arrive to arrest Jason. The viewer then has the option to determine if he turns himself in or escapes.

- If Jason turns himself in, he is given a life sentence and takes on the "Jailbird" persona to serve justice on the inside.
- If Jason attacks the police and escapes, he becomes the antihero Red Robin and begins a murderous rampage against Gotham's criminals (the same ones he kills in the "Robin Cheats Death" option). Eventually, he battles Two-Face at a mall. After gaining the upper hand on Red Robin, Two-Face flips his coin to determine Red Robin's fate. The viewer can decide which side the coin lands on:
  - If it lands on the good side, Two-Face decides to kill Red Robin, as he believes he would be doing Gotham a favor. Before he can do so, however, he is tased by a young Tim Drake. Tim convinces Jason to spare Two-Face by reminding him of Batman's dying words. Jason ultimately changes his ways, returns to the Bat Family, and adopts Tim as his new sidekick, Bat Kid.
  - If it lands on the bad side, Two-Face decides to spare Red Robin, as he believes letting Jason live with what he has become is a fate worse than death. Sure enough, Jason is wracked with guilt and retires from crime-fighting.

==== Catch the Joker ====
Jason attempts to fulfill his promise to Bruce not to kill the criminals he fights. To attract the Joker's attention, Jason adopts his previous persona of the Red Hood and wages a bloody war on Gotham's criminal underworld. He eventually manages to bring Joker out of hiding and defeats him in a fight. The Joker is overjoyed by what Jason has become and says that Jason is now more his successor than Batman's. Jason, who has been repressing his memories of killing criminals, suddenly realizes what he has done. The viewer can then decide once again whether Jason chooses to spare or kill the Joker.

Regardless of which option is chosen, Red Hood becomes a wanted fugitive and is pursued by the police and Dick. On top of a Wayne Industries tower one night, Jason is confronted by Talia and a revived Bruce Wayne. Talia reveals that she resurrected Bruce with the Lazarus Pit, but he was driven insane in the process and can only say "Zur-En-Arrh". She offers Jason the chance to join them in the League of Assassins, but he refuses and fights Batman. The viewer can decide whether Jason battles Batman to the death or tries to save him.

- If Red Hood fights Batman to the death, he fatally wounds Batman with his knife, leading Bruce to activate a hidden bomb that kills Jason, Talia, and himself.
- If Red Hood tries to save Batman, Jason tases Bruce and defeats Talia. Dick arrives shortly afterward and takes Bruce and Jason back to Wayne Manor. Barbara Gordon returns to crime-fighting as Dick's "Oracle", while Jason pauses to heal from the trauma. Bruce is locked in the Batcave as the Bat Family attempts to cure him of the effects of the Lazarus Pit. Bruce remembers the last words his father spoke to him, about how a masked vigilante like Zorro would not be welcome in Gotham and that people would lock "Zorro in Arkham", with "Zur-En-Arrh" being a fragmented mantra of the phrase.

== Cast ==
- Bruce Greenwood as Bruce Wayne / Batman
- Vincent Martella as Jason Todd / Robin / Red Robin / Red Hood / Hush
- John DiMaggio as Joker, Thomas Wayne, Reporter #2
- Zehra Fazal as Talia al Ghul, Reporter #3
- Kimberly Brooks as Police Officer #1, Reporter #1
- Nick Carson as Bruce Wayne (young), Tim Drake
- Gary Cole as Commissioner James Gordon, Two-Face, Reporter #4
- Keith Ferguson as Gangster #1
- Nolan North as Clark Kent, Police Officer #2

Dick Grayson / Nightwing / Batman, Alfred Pennyworth, Barbara Gordon, Harley Quinn (as Harleen Quinzel), Black Mask, Riddler, Cheetah, and Lex Luthor make non-speaking cameo appearances. Wonder Woman and Flash also appear in non-speaking cameos but are only partially visible.

== Production ==
Kevin Conroy and Mark Hamill, veteran actors who played Batman and the Joker, respectively, teased producing an animated adaptation of "A Death in the Family" during a panel at Canada's Fan Expo in 2016. The interactive film based on the comic was released on October 13, 2020, and also serves as a follow-up to the 2010 film Batman: Under the Red Hood, with the cast from the latter film reprising their roles (with the exception of Jensen Ackles as Red Hood, leaving Vincent Martella to portray him all throughout).

== Reception ==
On the review aggregator website Rotten Tomatoes, 78% of 9 critics' reviews are positive, with an average rating of 6.4/10.
