= Auricular =

Auricular may refer to:

== Medicine and anatomy ==
- Auricular muscles, surrounding the ear
- A relational adjective, as in the auricular branch of vagus nerve, used to delineate a relationship to the ear and its structures
  - Auricular branch (disambiguation), various nerves and veins
- A synonym for atrial, of or pertaining to the atrium (heart)

== Arts ==
- Auricular style, a 17th-century style in decorative art, especially Dutch metalwork

== See also ==
- Auricula (plural auriculae), auricle, or pinna, the visible part of the outer ear
- Auricle (disambiguation)
