= Peter Mooney =

Canadian actor

- Mooney in 2026
- Born: August 19, 1983 (age 43); Winnipeg, Manitoba, Canada
- Occupation: Actor
- Years active: 2000–present
- Spouse: Sarah Power (m. 2017)
- Children: 1

Peter Mooney (born August 19, 1983) is a Canadian actor, known for his role as Officer Nick Collins on the police drama series Rookie Blue and for playing Sir Kay on the historical fantasy series Camelot.

== Early life ==
Mooney was born in Winnipeg, Manitoba. He began learning his craft at the Manitoba Theatre for Young People, and is a graduate of the National Theatre School of Canada in Montreal, Quebec (2004).

== Career ==
One of Mooney's first major roles was Dr. Adrian Keeper on Global and ABC Family's Falcon Beach. 2009 saw Mooney star in the Canadian independent thriller Summer's Moon as Tom Hoxey, alongside Twilight actress Ashley Greene. In 2010, Starz picked him to play Kay in their television series Camelot. His most notable roles are Nick Collins on Rookie Blue and Dr. Jeremy Bishop on Saving Hope.

In March 2026, Titan Comics announced that it would be publishing Black Star, a five-issue, Gothic science fiction horror/fantasy noir comic book miniseries written by Mooney, actress Kristin Kreuk, and screenwriter Eric Putzer, who conceived of the idea when they worked together on Burden of Truth. Described as "a Northern Gothic Noir tinged with horror and dark humor", which combines elements from survivalist epics like The Revenant and magical quest stories such as Harry Potter and the Deathly Hallows: Part 1, the comic book is set in early 19th century Winnipeg, and follows a man named Dashiell Carlyle who, admist skirmishes between two warring factions in the fur trade, discovers that he has magical abilities, and that a secret order of other magic users that recruits him intends to use those powers to remake the world into a utopia at the cost of many innocent lives. The first issue of the series, which marks the first comics work by the three creators, was released on July 29, 2026 to positive reviews.

== Charity ==
In 2013, Mooney participated in the Charity Challenge trek to Machu Picchu, in support of UNICEF Canada.

== Personal life ==
Peter Mooney married Canadian actress Sarah Power in July 2017.

== Filmography ==
Year	Title	Role	Notes
2000	Scalpers	Featured Extra	
2002–2003	2030 CE	Stern	2 episodes
2005	Murdoch Mysteries	Henry Pedlow	1 episode
2005	Category 7: The End of the World	Peter	TV movie
2006	The Artists	James Wilson	
2006	Absolution	Father Steve Flannagan	TV movie
2006	Run Robot Run!	Adam	
2006	Falcon Beach	Dr. Adrian Keeper	22 episodes
2008	The Tower	Brian Donavan	TV movie
2009	Summer's Moon	Tom Hoxey	
2009	ZOS: Zone of Separation	Lt. Richard Matte	7 episodes
2009	Twelve Men of Christmas	Noah	TV movie
2010	Harriet the Spy: Blog Wars	Lazaar James	TV movie
2010	CSI: Miami	Dean Butler	Episode: Spring Breakdown
2011	Camelot	Sir Kay	Series Regular; Nominated – Canadian Screen Award for Best Performance by an Actor in a Featured Supporting Role in a Dramatic Program or Series
2012–2015	Rookie Blue	Nick Collins	Series Regular (seasons 3–6)
2013	Republic of Doyle	Tobey Quinton	1 episode
2013	Heartland	Brian Tanner	1 episode
2013	Played	Alex	Episode: "Cars"
2013	The Proposal	Jack	Short Film; Nominated – Action on Film Award for Male Action Performer of the Year
2014	Parachute	Justin	Short Film
2014	We Were Wolves	Nick	
2015	Heroes Reborn	Francis	3 episodes
2015	Saving Hope	Jeremy Bishop	Season 4-5
2016	Entonces Nosotros	Christopher	
2016	Must Kill Karl	Aubrey	Short Film
2017	Betting on the Bride	Damon	
2018	Catch and Release	Cole	
2018	Paseo	Frasier	
2018–2021	Burden of Truth	Billy Crawford	Main Role
2018	Wynonna Earp	Rowan Quinn	1 episode
2022	Fly Away with Me	Ted	Hallmark TV Movie
2023	Retreat to You		Hallmark TV Movie
2024	Law & Order Toronto: Criminal Intent	Nick Millwood	Episode: "The Key to the Castle"
2024	Sweet Angel Baby		
2024	Levels	Joe	
2024-present	Mistletoe Murders	Sam Wilner	Main Role
