= Larry the Lobster (disambiguation) =

Larry the Lobster was the subject of an Eddie Murphy sketch on Saturday Night Live. It may also refer to:

- Larry the Lobster, a character from the television cartoon series SpongeBob SquarePants
- "Larry the Lobster", a nickname for the Big Lobster tourist attraction in Kingston SE, South Australia
