= A Death in the Family (comics) =

1988 Batman comic book storyline

- Cover of Batman #428 (October 18, 1988); Art by Mike Mignola
- Publisher: DC Comics
- Publication date: August – November 1988
- Title(s): Batman #426–429
- Main characters: Batman; Robin (Jason Todd); Joker; Superman

Creative team
- Writer: Jim Starlin
- Penciller: Jim Aparo
- Inker: Mike DeCarlo
- Letterer: John Costanza
- Colorist: Adrienne Roy
- Editor: Dennis O'Neil

"A Death in the Family" is a 1988 storyline in the American comic book Batman, published by DC Comics. It was written by Jim Starlin and penciled by Jim Aparo, with cover art by Mike Mignola. Serialized in Batman #426–429 from August to November 1988, "A Death in the Family" is considered one of the most important Batman stories for featuring the death of his sidekick Robin at the hands of his archenemy, the Joker.

Jason Todd, the second character to assume the Robin persona, was introduced in 1983 to replace Dick Grayson, who was unavailable for use at the time. Jason became unpopular among readers after 1986, as writers began to characterize him as rebellious and impulsive, and Starlin advocated killing him off. Editor Dennis O'Neil was considering having Jason revamped or written out of Batman when he recalled a 1982 Saturday Night Live sketch in which Eddie Murphy encouraged viewers to call the show if they wanted him to boil a lobster on air. Inspired to orchestrate a similar stunt, DC set up a 900 number voting system to allow fans to decide Jason's fate.

"A Death in the Family" begins when Batman relieves Jason of his crime-fighting duties. Jason travels to the Middle East to find his biological mother, but is kidnapped and tortured by the Joker. Batman #427 ends with the Joker blowing Jason up in a warehouse. Starlin and Aparo prepared two versions of the following issue: one that would be published if readers voted to have Jason survive, and another if he was to be killed. A narrow majority voted in favor of the latter, and Batman #428 features Batman discovering Jason's lifeless body in the warehouse ruins. The storyline ends when Batman and Superman stop the Joker from killing the United Nations General Assembly. The story was controversial and widely publicized; despite Jason's unpopularity, DC faced backlash for the decision to kill one of its most iconic characters.

Retrospective reviewers agreed with the decision to kill Jason and have ranked "A Death in the Family" among the best Batman stories, though its plot has been criticized as nonsensical and its depiction of the Middle East as Islamophobic. Jason's death had a lasting effect on Batman stories, with Batman's failure to save him pushing the comic book mythos in a darker direction. Tim Drake succeeded Jason as Robin in 1989, and Jason was resurrected as the Red Hood in the "Under the Hood" (2004–2006) storyline. "A Death in the Family" remains a popular story among readers and has been reprinted in trade paperback form since its initial publication. Plot elements have been incorporated into Batman films, television series, and video games. An animated interactive film adaptation, Batman: Death in the Family, was released in 2020.

== Publication history ==
=== Background ===
[The fans] did hate [Jason Todd]. I don't know if it was fan craziness—maybe they saw him as usurping Dick Grayson's position... It may be that something was working in the writers' minds, probably on a subconscious level. They made [Jason] a little bit more disagreeable than his predecessor had been. He did become unlikeable and that was not any doing of mine.

— Dennis O'Neil on Jason Todd's unpopularity

Robin, the adolescent sidekick of the DC Comics superhero Batman, first appeared in Detective Comics #38 in April 1940. He was introduced by Bob Kane, Bill Finger, and Jerry Robinson to give Batman a companion and increase his appeal to children. The original Robin, Dick Grayson, made regular appearances in Batman publications from 1940 until the early 1980s, when Marv Wolfman and George Pérez began including him in the New Teen Titans comics. So Robin could continue appearing in Batman comics, Batman writer Gerry Conway and artist Don Newton introduced Jason Todd in Batman #357 (March 1983). Wolfman and Pérez had Dick set aside the Robin identity and become the independent superhero Nightwing in Teen Titans, while Jason became Robin in the Batman comics.

Originally, Jason's origin story was virtually identical to Dick's; like Dick, Jason was depicted as the son of circus acrobats, who became Batman's sidekick after his parents were murdered. Dennis O'Neil, who wrote Batman and Detective Comics throughout the 1970s and became the Batman group editor in 1986, said that Conway and Newton "[weren't] worried about creating a new character. I think they thought, 'We've got to have a Robin in the series so let's go with the tried and true. This Robin has worked for so many years, so let's do him again.'" Following the Crisis on Infinite Earths (1985–1986) crossover event, which rebooted the DC Universe, (Note: The DC Universe is the shared universe that most of DC's comics, including those related to Batman, take place within.) Batman writer Max Allan Collins was asked to reintroduce Jason. Batman #408 (June 1987) began a four-issue story by Collins and artist Chris Warner that reimagined Jason as a street delinquent whom Batman attempts to reform.

The revamped Jason was unpopular among readers, who disliked his rebellious, impulsive nature. A scene in Batman #424 (June 1988) in which Jason seemingly breaks Batman's no-killing rule and lies about it was particularly controversial. After Collins quit over creative differences, writer Jim Starlin and penciler Jim Aparo took over Batman. Starlin disliked Robin, as he found the concept of a crimefighter using a child as a sidekick ridiculous. He initially avoided featuring Jason, but began to use him at the request of O'Neil. Starlin "decided to play on that dislike" in his stories. By 1988, the Batman creative team knew Jason presented a problem that needed to be resolved.

=== Development ===
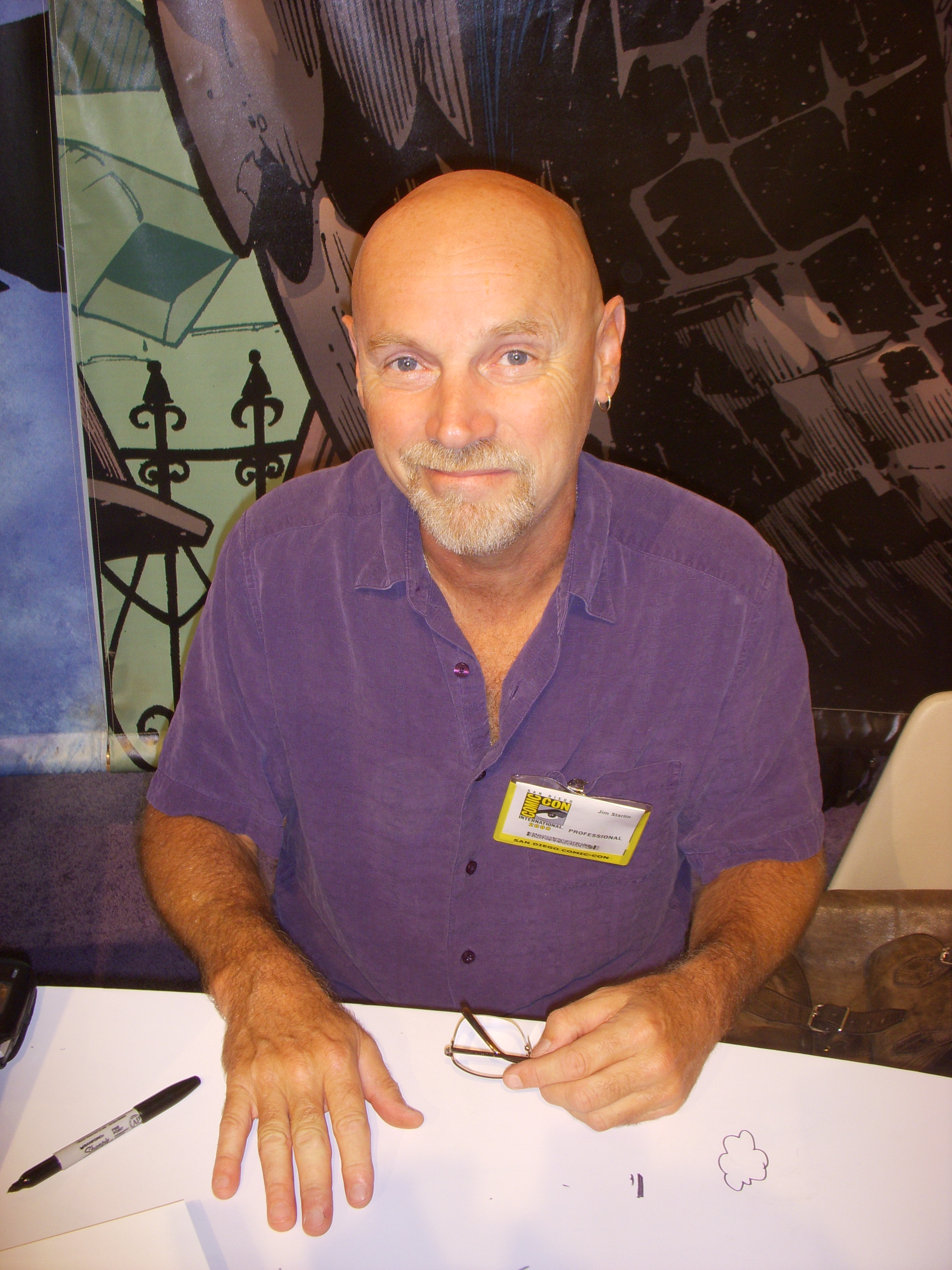
Jim Starlin (pictured in 2008) proposed killing Robin six months before he was asked to write "A Death in the Family".

O'Neil decided that Jason either needed another personality revamp or to be written out of Batman. Around that time, DC was planning to publish a comic promoting HIV/AIDS education, and requested that writers submit suggestions for characters to kill off from AIDS. Starlin, who had advocated killing Robin when he began writing Batman, filled the suggestion box with proposals to kill off Jason, but DC staff rejected the idea after realizing all the papers had Starlin's handwriting. However, DC president Jenette Kahn wanted to address Jason's unpopularity. O'Neil and Kahn attended an editorial retreat, where O'Neil recalled a 1982 Saturday Night Live sketch in which Eddie Murphy encouraged viewers to call one of two 900 numbers if they wanted him to boil a lobster on air. The sketch garnered widespread publicity and nearly 500,000 viewers called in. O'Neil proposed a similar stunt involving one of the DC characters, which Kahn found intriguing.

O'Neil decided that Jason was "the logical candidate to be in peril", as he was unpopular and placing him in such a situation would have massive ramifications. He said: "We didn't want to waste it on anything minor. Whether Firestorm's boots should be red or yellow ... This had to be important. Life or death stuff". Kahn added that they wanted to allow fans to have input in what to do with Jason, rather than "autocratically" writing him out and replacing him. The idea of having fans call to influence the creative process was a novel concept at the time, and DC's sales and marketing vice president Bruce Bristow described setting up the numbers as the most difficult part of the project. Sales manager John Pope began calling AT&T to secure the two 900 numbers on October 1, 1987; it took him until March 1988 to reserve them.

Six months after Starlin proposed killing Jason, O'Neil asked him to start working on a potential story. Starlin decided to have the Joker murder Jason, inspired by The Dark Knight Returns (1986), a limited series by Frank Miller that featured Batman retiring after the Joker kills Robin. Starlin wrote scripts for a six-issue story, and the decision was made to combine the first four across two issues to speed up the story because fans were participating. Aparo, inker Mike DeCarlo, and colorist Adrienne Roy provided the art, and assistant editor Dan Raspler suggested Mike Mignola as the storyline's cover artist. Batman #427 features Batman arriving at a warehouse where Jason is imprisoned just as it explodes. On the back cover, an advertisement featured Batman carrying a severely wounded Jason. Readers were warned that Jason could die of his injuries, but that they could "prevent it with a telephone call". Two 900 numbers were given: one (1-900-720-2660) which would let Robin live, and another (1-900-720-2666) which would cause him to die. The numbers were activated for 35 hours in the United States and Canada from 9 a.m. Eastern Time on September 15, 1988.

Artwork from the unpublished (left) and published (right) versions of Batman #428, showing the two planned scenarios. Because readers voted to kill Jason, the left page went unpublished. Art by Jim Aparo, Mike DeCarlo, and Adrienne Roy.

Starlin and the artists prepared two versions of Batman #428, depending on the outcome. As O'Neil stated: "It really could have gone either way. We prepared two choices of balloons. We had alternate panels. We had everything set up so that the two outcomes could be accomplished with a minimum of changes. We prepared for either situation". Raspler explained that Aparo prepared three alternate pages and several panels with static images that could be easily rearranged. O'Neil voted to let Jason live, as he felt killing the character would complicate his job as an editor, and Starlin was unable to vote because he was in Mexico at the time. O'Neil and Raspler checked the results every 90 minutes. DC executive editor and vice president Dick Giordano expected readers to vote in favor of Jason's survival; O'Neil believed they would vote for his death to see if DC would follow through.

The poll received 10,614 votes and 5,343 voted for Jason's death over 5,271 for his survival—a margin of just 72 votes. Although Kahn dispelled rumors that the process was rigged in favor of Jason's demise, O'Neil said it was possible many votes favoring Jason's death came from a single person. He recalled hearing that "a lawyer programmed his Macintosh to dial the killing number every few minutes", but had no evidence. O'Neil canceled a party he planned to throw once the verdict was in and decided to keep the result secret until Batman #428 was shipped. O'Neil did not tell his wife, Starlin, or Aparo. Starlin had expected Jason to die but was surprised by how close the vote was. Production director Bob Rozakis supervised Roy as she finished coloring, and then had Steve Bove take the "real" Batman #428 to finish it in the secrecy of his basement.

=== Publication ===
"A Death in the Family" was published when Batman was surging in popularity. Following the success of The Dark Knight Returns and the "Year One" (1987) storyline, monthly sales for Batman were at their highest level since the early 1970s, and Tim Burton's Batman (1989) feature film was in production. DC announced "A Death in the Family" shortly after the release of the critically acclaimed graphic novel Batman: The Killing Joke in 1988; according to author Chris Sims, the Batman letter column immediately "broke out into debate" over whether Jason should live or die.

Batman #426, the first issue of "A Death in the Family", was released on August 23, 1988, and Batman #427, the second, was released two weeks later, on September 6. Fans voted to determine Jason's fate between September 15 and 16, and Batman #428, which featured Jason's death, was released on October 18. The storyline concluded with Batman #429, on November 29. The last two issues contained a guest appearance from Superman.

After the first three issues of "A Death in the Family" sold out, DC compiled the storyline into a trade paperback in time for the 1988 Christmas shopping season. The collection, Batman: A Death in the Family, shipped on December 5, less than a week after Batman #429. A 2009 hardcover reprint included Wolfman, Pérez, and Aparo's 1989 sequel storyline, "A Lonely Place of Dying", which introduced Jason's successor Tim Drake. A hardcover deluxe edition was published in April 2021.

For many years, the version of Batman #428 in which Jason lives remained unpublished, though the pages remained housed in DC's archives in Burbank, California. Batman Annual #25, published in March 2006, used one of the alternate pages Aparo had prepared; some panels were released by Les Daniels in his book Batman: The Complete History (1999) and by Polygon journalist Susana Polo in 2020. In March 2020, the DC Daily web show unveiled all of the pages to the public for the first time, and the artwork was published in the 2021 deluxe edition. A physical facsimile issue of the alternate pages, including the original advertisements and letters column, was published on December 12, 2023.

== Synopsis ==
While eavesdropping on a child pornography ring and awaiting police backup in Gotham City, Jason Todd (Robin) ignores Batman's orders and attacks the criminals. Batman chastises Jason and asks if he considers crimefighting a game; Jason replies that life is a game. At Wayne Manor, Batman decides Jason is emotionally unstable and relieves him of his duties as Robin; an enraged Jason storms off. Meanwhile, the Joker escapes from Arkham Asylum. Batman discovers that he has obtained a nuclear weapon and plans to sell it to terrorists, and tracks him to war-torn Lebanon.

Walking through his old neighborhood, Jason meets a friend of his late parents, who gives him his father's old documents. Jason discovers that his mother's name on his birth certificate is blotted out. Her first initial is "S", not "C" as in Catherine Todd, the woman he knew as his mother. Jason concludes that Catherine was his stepmother and decides to search for his biological mother. He uses the Batcomputer to track three possible individuals to the Middle East and Africa. Jason travels to Lebanon, where he and Batman reunite. The two foil an attempt by terrorists to destroy Tel Aviv using the nuclear missile purchased from the Joker. Batman agrees to help Jason find his mother, and Jason interrogates his first suspect, Mossad agent Sharmin Rosen. His next suspect, Batman's old acquaintance Lady Shiva, says she is not Jason's mother after she is administered a truth serum by the duo.

Batman and Jason travel to Ethiopia and confirm that Jason's mother is Sheila Haywood, an aid worker; Jason has an emotional reunion with her. However, the Joker discovers that Sheila had performed illegal surgeries on teenagers in Gotham and has been blacklisted as a medical practitioner. He blackmails her into giving him the medical supplies her agency has stockpiled in a warehouse. He sells them on the black market and stocks the warehouse with Joker venom, which will kill thousands of people. Jason witnesses the Joker blackmail Sheila, so he reveals his identity as Robin to her and offers to help. Sheila rebuffs him, as she has been embezzling from the aid agency; in an attempt to cover this up, she hands Jason over to the Joker. The Joker beats Jason with a crowbar and restrains him and Sheila in the warehouse with a time bomb. Jason throws himself on the bomb to protect Sheila as the warehouse explodes. Batman arrives too late to save them, and Jason and Sheila die from their injuries.

Traumatized, Batman takes Jason and Sheila's remains to Gotham and holds a burial with Alfred Pennyworth, Commissioner James Gordon, and Barbara Gordon. Batman blames himself for Jason's death and resolves to carry on alone, rejecting Alfred's suggestion to involve Dick Grayson, the first Robin. Ayatollah Khomeini approaches the Joker and offers him a role in the Iranian government. The Joker leaves a warehouse containing the corpses of his henchmen and the address of the UN Headquarters for Batman. As Batman waits outside the UN building, Superman appears and tries to convince Batman to leave. The Joker is Iran's representative to the UN and will be giving a speech on the floor of the General Assembly, and any confrontation between Batman and him could start a diplomatic incident.

During his speech, the Joker attempts to poison the chamber with Joker venom, but Superman intercepts it. Batman pursues the Joker onto a helicopter sent by his sponsors. During the resulting struggle, one of the Joker's henchmen opens fire with a machine gun and shoots the pilot, crashing the helicopter into the sea. Superman saves Batman, but the Joker disappears. Batman laments that everything between him and the Joker ends unresolved.

== Reception ==
=== Initial ===
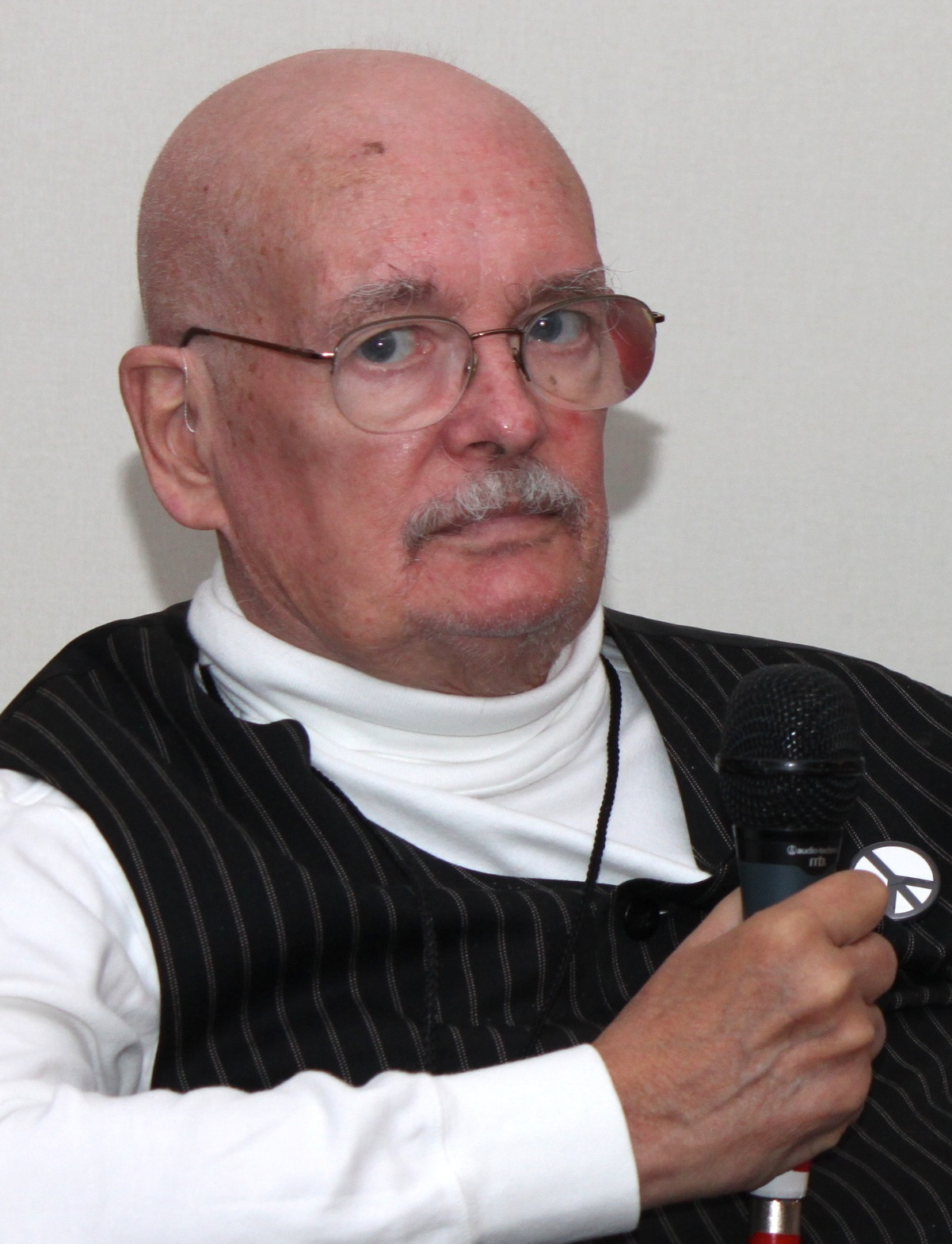
Editor Dennis O'Neil (pictured in 2012) proposed that DC allow fans to decide if Jason was to die.

The first three chapters of "A Death in the Family" sold out quickly, and according to Starlin, the storyline was DC's bestselling comic of 1988. The storyline drew coverage in news outlets including USA Today, Reuters, and the Deseret News. Many reports did not mention that Jason was not the original Robin. As an editor at Marvel Comics, O'Neil had received angry mail from fans when characters such as Phoenix and Elektra were killed, so he was prepared for reader backlash to Jason's death. However, "A Death in the Family" created much more controversy, as Robin was one of DC's most iconic characters and the Marvel deaths had occurred during a period of recession in comics.

O'Neil spent the days following Batman #428's publication "doing nothing but talking on the radio. I thought it would get us some ink here and there and maybe a couple of radio interviews. I had no idea—nor did anyone else—it would have the effect it did". After three days, Peggy May, DC's publicity manager, ordered O'Neil to stop talking to the media. She also barred anyone from discussing the story on television. Though initially confused, O'Neil came to appreciate May's order because he did not want the public to see him as "the guy who killed Robin". Assistant editor Dan Raspler was chastised by DC's then-executive vice president Paul Levitz for referring to "A Death in the Family" as a "stunt" in an interview.

Jason's death divided fans at the time. Many readers celebrated, some hoping it meant that Dick could become Robin again. Others lamented how bloodthirsty comic book readers were. O'Neil and the Batman team received hate mail and angry phone calls; according to O'Neil, the calls ranged from "'You bastard', to tearful grandmothers saying, 'My grandchild loved Robin and I don't know what to tell him.'" Frank Miller was critical, calling the story "the most cynical thing [DC] has ever done ... fans can call in to put the axe to a little boy's head. To me the whole killing of Robin thing was probably the ugliest thing I've seen in comics". NPR cultural critic Glen Weldon found the criticism ironic, as it was Miller who came up with the idea of the Joker killing Jason in The Dark Knight Returns.

=== Retrospective ===
Critics have agreed with the decision to kill Jason in retrospect. Sims wrote that killing Jason was "unquestionably the right decision" and made for a far better story. He opined that allowing the Joker to defeat Batman enhanced both characters: the Joker became "a deadly threat ... whose actions have lasting consequences", while Batman had "a motivating loss at a time when new readers were coming in". Hilary Goldstein of IGN and Jamie Hailstone of Den of Geek praised the story's handling of Jason's death for its emotion and portraying the dangers of superheroics.

Retrospective reviewers have faulted "A Death in the Family" for its plot. Hailstone described "A Death in the Family" as "the ultimate 80s epic": "brasher than Top Gun, louder than Hulk Hogan and more implausible than The A-Team". Both Hailstone and Goldstein found the plot hard to believe, and Hailstone said that it veers into nonsense when the Joker is appointed as an ambassador. Charles Prefore, writing for Screen Rant, said the story "can't decide if it wants to be fun or dark"; while Jason's torture and death at the hands of the Joker is somber, elements like the "globetrotting nature of the story" and the Joker becoming an ambassador for Iran are evocative of the goofy Silver Age of Comic Books. Prefore said the story's grim moments, which caused "A Death in the Family" to gain a reputation as one of the darkest Batman stories, overshadowed the rest of its outlandishness.

"A Death in the Family" remains a popular story among readers, and despite their reservations over the plot, critics still deemed it worth reading. Hailstone called the story a "guilty pleasure" that, while not as groundbreaking as "Year One" or Batman: Son of the Demon (1987), was entertaining nonetheless, and Prefore summarized it as "a good read if you don't mind all the strangeness". Publications ranking it among the best Batman stories include IGN and Complex in 2014, and GamesRadar+ and Screen Rant in 2021. Sean T. Collins of Rolling Stone ranked it among the 15 Batman stories he considered "essential" to understanding the character, praising Aparo's art and how Starlin characterizes the Joker.

== Analysis ==
Despite Robin's status as one of the most famous sidekicks in comic book history, there has been little literary analysis of "A Death in the Family". According to literary critic Kwasu Tembo, it is generally only discussed "as either a case study within a broader discussion of Batman's ethics, or as a case study of DC's editorial decisions and socio-historical engagement with its readership". The story's message is that Batman cannot save everyone, and it portrays Jason as a tragic figure whose sympathetic journey ends in death. Tembo contended that the death leaves the reader to ponder Jason's nature as "Batman's greatest failure, as an orphan betrayed, and/or as a careless and overzealous lost boy who reaped what he had so impulsively and thoughtlessly sown".

Tembo theorized that Jason's death, as voted for by readers, "can be more thoroughly understood as a complex form of scapegoating", comparable to a public execution. Jason was unpopular because he struggled to live up to the standard of his predecessor Dick, which made him a "bad" Robin. This created jealousy among readers, who concluded that Jason was unfit to be Robin. Citing René Girard's theory of mimetic desire, Tembo wrote that O'Neil's decision to let fans determine Jason's fate created a "mimetic crisis" because readers "could now not only influence [Jason's] existence in the story world, but in being given this power, compete against him". Readers instead saw themselves as more fit to be Batman's partner; by voting to kill Jason, they thought they were helping Batman. Tembo noted the closeness of the vote indicated fans may not have despised Jason as much as commonly believed. Fans who voted to save Jason may have voted to preserve the classic status quo, or because they found the Joker murdering a child during an emotional period in his life unsettling.

=== Depiction of the Middle East and Islam ===
As an Iranian ambassador, the Joker wears a traditional Arab headdress and robes although Iran is not an Arab country. Art by Jim Aparo, Mike DeCarlo, and Adrienne Roy.

Written in the aftermath of the Iran–Contra affair, "A Death in the Family" reflects American attitudes towards the Middle East in the 1980s, and has been criticized as inaccurate and relying on racist caricatures. Starlin writes Batman as speaking Farsi, the Persian language, in Beirut (where Arabic is actually the commonly spoken language), and the Joker dons a traditional Arab headdress and robes as the Iranian ambassador, although Iran is not an Arab country. Chrishaun Baker of Inverse described the Joker's alliance with Khomeini as "the culmination of an embarrassing series of storytelling gaffs that flattens the complexities of Middle Eastern turmoil into a homogenous caricature of racial stereotypes".

Several writers have described the portrayal of Arab terrorists as Islamophobic. They are depicted as anti-American, anti-Israel fanatics who seek to violently take over the Western world. They are referred to as "bandits-in-bedsheets" and depicted as unshaved and always holding weapons, while Jamal, the terrorist leader, is overweight and perpetually sneering. In a 1991 study of Arab terrorist depictions in comic books, Jack Shaheen wrote that "A Death in the Family" conflates Arabs, Muslims, and terrorists, and equates them to the Joker, an insane supervillain. Jehanzeb Dar and Shaheen cited the Joker's speech to the General Assembly as particularly Islamophobic. Before he attempts to poison the chamber, the Joker gloats:

I am proud to speak for the great Islamic Republic of Iran. That country's current leaders and I have a lot in common. Insanity and a great love of fish. But unfortunately we share a mutual problem. We get no respect. Everyone thinks of Iran as the home of the terrorist zealot! They say even worse things about me, would you believe? We've both suffered unkind abuse and belittlement! Well, we aren't going to take it anymore!! You'll no longer be allowed to kick us around. In fact, you aren't going to be able to kick anyone around ever again!

— The Joker, Batman #429

Dar described the Joker's speech as blatant Islamophobia disguised as humor. Shaheen and Dar argued "A Death in the Family" promotes the idea of "Them vs. Us", pitting the Arab and Western worlds against each other as diametrically opposed in values. Dar said that "[Starlin]'s and [DC]'s disregard for cultural, religious, and political accuracy simply points to a crude and racist generalization: Arabs, Iranians, and Muslims are all the 'same' and 'hate' the West".

== Legacy ==
"A Death in the Family" was part of the American comic book industry's trend towards "grim and gritty" comics in the late 1980s, and is remembered as one of DC's most controversial storylines. Chris Snellgrove of Looper described the scenes depicting Jason's torture and death—with the Joker covered in his blood— as "one of the most disturbing moments in the publisher's long history". DC editors took the lessons they learned from the controversy and used media coverage for publicity when killing off major characters in the future, such as Superman in "The Death of Superman" (1992–1993).

Although "A Death in the Family" sold well, it harmed Starlin's standing at DC. DC's licensing department was infuriated over the death because of the amount of merchandise—such as lunchboxes and pajamas—that bore Robin's likeness. According to Starlin, "everybody got mad, and they needed somebody to blame—so I got blamed". Work quickly declined for him, and within six months he departed DC and returned to Marvel Comics, where he wrote The Infinity Gauntlet (1991).

=== Effect on future stories ===
"A Death in the Family" is regarded as one of the most important Batman comics for its effect on future Batman stories. The story altered the DC Universe: instead of killing anonymous bystanders, the Joker murdered a core character in the Batman fiction. Alongside The Killing Joke (which featured Barbara Gordon, Batgirl, being shot in the stomach and paralyzed) and the success of the 1989 Batman film, "A Death in the Family" pushed the Batman mythos in a darker direction. It portrayed Batman as more violent and emotional following Jason's death, and for the next decade of comic book canon, he was haunted by his failure to save him. Conway felt that the storyline allowed for "the entrance of the real 'Dark Knight', the idea of Batman as the pitiless enforcer of Gotham". When the DC Universe continuity was rebooted during DC's 2011 New 52 initiative, the events of "A Death in the Family" were left intact because DC editors deemed it too important.

Jason was likely to be replaced as Robin regardless of his survival. O'Neil wanted to wait a year for a successor, but DC management demanded a new Robin immediately. O'Neil and Wolfman began developing the character of Tim Drake, who debuted in the 1989 storyline "A Lonely Place of Dying" by Wolfman, Pérez, and Aparo. O'Neil arranged for a nuanced introduction that explained why Batman would need a new sidekick after Jason's death, and Tim was designed to appeal to both Jason's fans and detractors. Tim proved popular and starred in several limited series and a 1993–2009 ongoing series, until he was replaced by Damian Wayne in 2009. Damian shared Jason's willingness to go against Batman's wishes and use lethal force; Grant Morrison and Frazer Irving's Batman and Robin #13 (2010) featured a scene in which Damian beat the Joker with a crowbar, paralleling Jason's murder.

Throughout the 1990s and early 2000s, Jason's death was one of the few comic book deaths that remained unreversed. Unlike traditional comic book deaths, Jason's was intended to stay permanent; at the time of "A Death in the Family"'s publication, O'Neil said that "it would be a really sleazy stunt to bring him back". A popular aphorism among comic book fans was that in comics, no characters stayed dead except Bucky Barnes, Uncle Ben, and Jason. (Note: Marvel would revive Bucky Barnes in 2004 as the Winter Soldier.) Jason's revival was first teased in the "Hush" (2002–2003) storyline by Jeph Loeb and Jim Lee, which features Clayface impersonating an undead Jason to taunt Batman. After writer Judd Winick read "Hush", he wondered why DC never revived Jason. Winick and artist Doug Mahnke's 2004–2006 storyline "Under the Hood" revived him as the murderous vigilante Red Hood; the in-universe explanation for Jason's revival was that he was restored to life after Superboy-Prime punched the wall of the pocket dimension he was residing in. Jason eventually re-joined Batman's supporting cast as an "on-again, off-again ally", and starred in the series Red Hood and the Outlaws (2011–2021). Despite his resurrection, in 2020 journalist Susana Polo noted Jason was still most famous for dying in "A Death in the Family".

== In other media ==
=== Television ===
- Bruce Timm and Paul Dini considered adapting "A Death in the Family" for Batman: The Animated Series (1992–1995), but decided it was too violent. Instead, they omitted the Jason character and incorporated some of his characteristics in Tim when the series was rebranded as The New Batman Adventures (1997–1999).
- In the Batman: The Brave and the Bold episode "Emperor Joker!", a fourth wall-breaking Bat-Mite (Paul Reubens) references "A Death in the Family" and the 900 number, and Batman is briefly seen cradling a dead Robin.
- The DC Universe and HBO Max streaming television series Titans (2018–2023) features Jason as a central character portrayed by Curran Walters. After the second season episode "Deathstroke" (2019) ended on a cliffhanger with Deathstroke (Esai Morales) attempting to kill Jason, DC Universe held a poll in which fans could vote to determine Jason's fate. The poll was only intended as a reference to "A Death in the Family" and had no effect on the series, but elements from "A Death in the Family" were incorporated in the third season of Titans, which premiered in 2021.

=== Film ===
- Elements of Jason Todd's torture at the Joker's hands are incorporated into Batman Beyond: Return of the Joker, with Tim Drake taking Jason's place.
- Elements from "A Death in the Family" were incorporated in the 2010 DC Universe Animated Original Movies film Batman: Under the Red Hood, an adaptation of "Under the Hood" directed by Brandon Vietti. In the film, Ra's al Ghul (Jason Isaacs) hires the Joker (John DiMaggio) to distract Batman (Bruce Greenwood) and Jason (Jensen Ackles) while he destroys Europe's financial districts. They follow the Joker to Bosnia, where he kills Jason in similar fashion to "A Death in the Family".
- "A Death in the Family" is referenced in the DC Extended Universe (DCEU), a shared universe of superhero films based on DC characters. Batman v Superman: Dawn of Justice (2016) features a damaged Robin suit on display in the Batcave, while Suicide Squad (2016) reveals that Harley Quinn (Margot Robbie) helped the Joker (Jared Leto) murder him. Zack Snyder's Justice League (the 2021 director's cut of Justice League (2017)) features a scene in which the Joker mocks Batman (Ben Affleck) for Robin's death. Though Warner Bros. and Suicide Squad director David Ayer stated that the dead Robin was Jason, Batman v Superman director Zack Snyder later said he had intended it to be Dick, unlike "A Death in the Family". Snyder had planned to explore Robin's death in detail in his Justice League sequels before their cancellation. Before the release of Zack Snyder's Justice League, Snyder proposed a comic book prequel to Batman v Superman that depicted Robin's death, but DC turned it down.
- An interactive film adaptation, Batman: Death in the Family, was released in 2020. The film is a sequel to Under the Red Hood, Vietti again directing. The cast of Red Hood returned to reprise their roles, with the exception of Vincent Martella, who replaced Ackles. Similar to the voting system from the comic, the film allows viewers to determine if Jason lives or dies, leading to different scenarios that see him become Red Hood, Hush, or Red Robin.

=== Video games ===
Jason's portrayal in the video game Batman: Arkham Knight (2015) was inspired by "A Death in the Family".

=== Miscellaneous ===
"A Death in the Family" was adapted in Batman: The Adventures Continue (2020), written by Dini and Alan Burnett and penciled by Ty Templeton. In The Adventures Continue, the Joker and Harley Quinn kidnap Jason, and the Joker beats him with a crowbar with intent to kill him. Harley objects to killing a child and finds Batman, who arrives as the warehouse is engulfed in flames due to hydrogen tanks. A wounded Jason begs for Batman to kill the Joker, but Batman instead tries to save him; Jason attempts to stop Batman but knocks over more hydrogen tanks, causing the explosion and his apparent death.
