= Ashley Greene =

American actress (born 1987)

- Greene in 2026
- Born: February 21, 1987 (age 39); Jacksonville, Florida, U.S.
- Occupation: Actress
- Years active: 2005–present
- Spouse: Paul Khoury (m. 2018)
- Children: 1

Ashley Greene Khoury (born February 21, 1987) is an American actress. She is known for playing Alice Cullen in the film adaptations of Stephenie Meyer's Twilight novels.

== Early life ==
Greene was born on February 21, 1987, in Jacksonville, Florida, United States. Her father, Joe Greene Sr., a former U.S. Marine, owns a concrete construction business, while her mother, Michele (née Tatum), works for an insurance company. She is the younger of two children, with a brother. She was raised between Jacksonville and Middleburg. Greene went to University Christian School before transferring to Samuel W. Wolfson High School when she was in tenth grade. She moved to Los Angeles at age 17 to pursue an acting career.

== Career ==
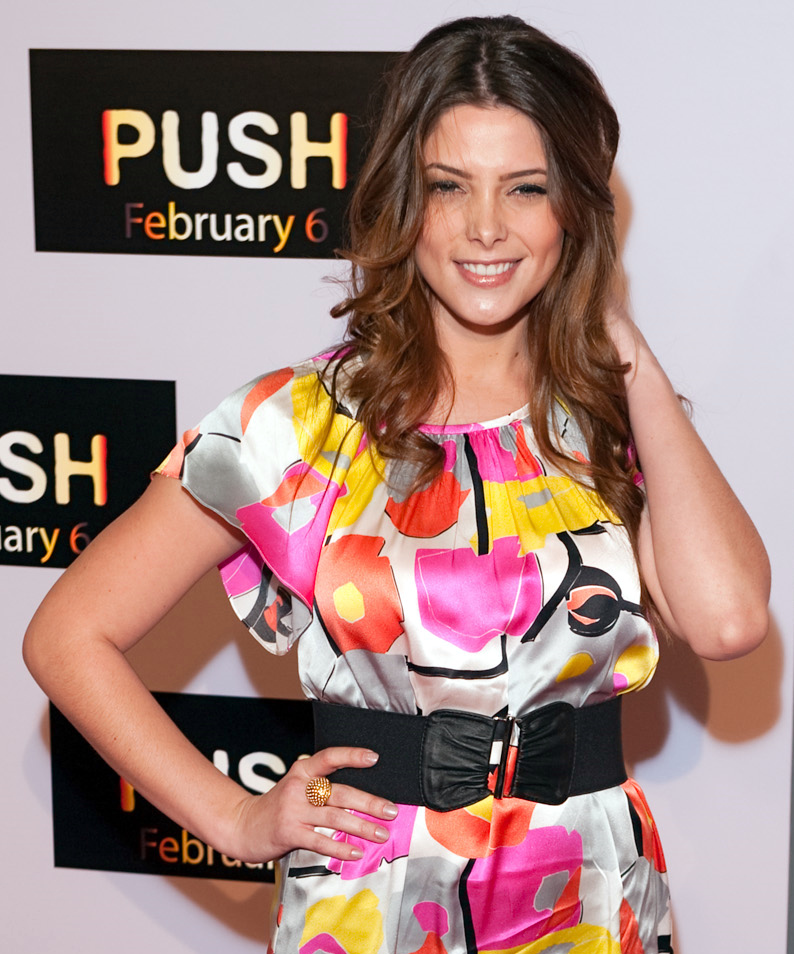
Ashley Greene at the premiere of Push in January 2009

Greene initially planned to become a model, but was told that she was not tall enough at 5 feet 5 inches (1.65 m) to be a fashion model and should instead focus on acting in commercials. After taking commercial and acting class, she fell in love with acting and realized that she preferred it over modeling. Greene graduated from high school early and moved to Los Angeles to pursue an acting career.

Early in her career, she appeared as a guest on such television programs, as Punk'd and Crossing Jordan. Greene's big break came in 2008, when she was cast as Alice Cullen in The Twilight Saga series of films, based on the novel series of the same name by Stephenie Meyer. The series consists of the films Twilight, The Twilight Saga: New Moon, The Twilight Saga: Eclipse, The Twilight Saga: Breaking Dawn – Part 1, and The Twilight Saga: Breaking Dawn – Part 2, which were respectively released in 2008, 2009, 2010, 2011, and 2012.

Greene portrayed Michelle Burkham in the drama film Skateland, which premiered at the 2010 Sundance Film Festival.

She reunited with her Twilight co-star Kellan Lutz in the movie A Warrior's Heart (2011), and also starred in thriller film Summer's Blood (2009) and the Dark Castle Entertainment horror film The Apparition (2012).

In 2013, Greene starred in the film CBGB about the storied former music club of the same name. In 2015, she voiced Barbara Gordon/Oracle in Batman: Arkham Knight. In 2026, she played a fictionalized version of herself in the Disney+ series Wonder Man.

== Personal life ==
Greene is a friend of her Twilight co-stars, Kellan Lutz and Jackson Rathbone, whom she knew before filming of the series began. She has stated that she grew up watching football and is a Florida Gators fan. In 2009, nude self-portraits of Greene were leaked onto the internet. Her attorneys threatened to sue various websites that published the pictures.

In 2010, she received "The Style Icon Award" at Hollywood Life's Young Hollywood Awards, as well as an award from People for the Ethical Treatment of Animals for representing Avon and their no testing on animals policy.

=== Relationships ===
Greene dated Joe Jonas for a year before they broke up in March 2011. In October 2012, Greene began dating Reeve Carney, but the couple split after being together for ten months because their schedules and other projects took them away from each other.

In 2009, Greene met her future husband Paul Khoury through mutual friends. They married in 2018 and have one child.

== Filmography ==
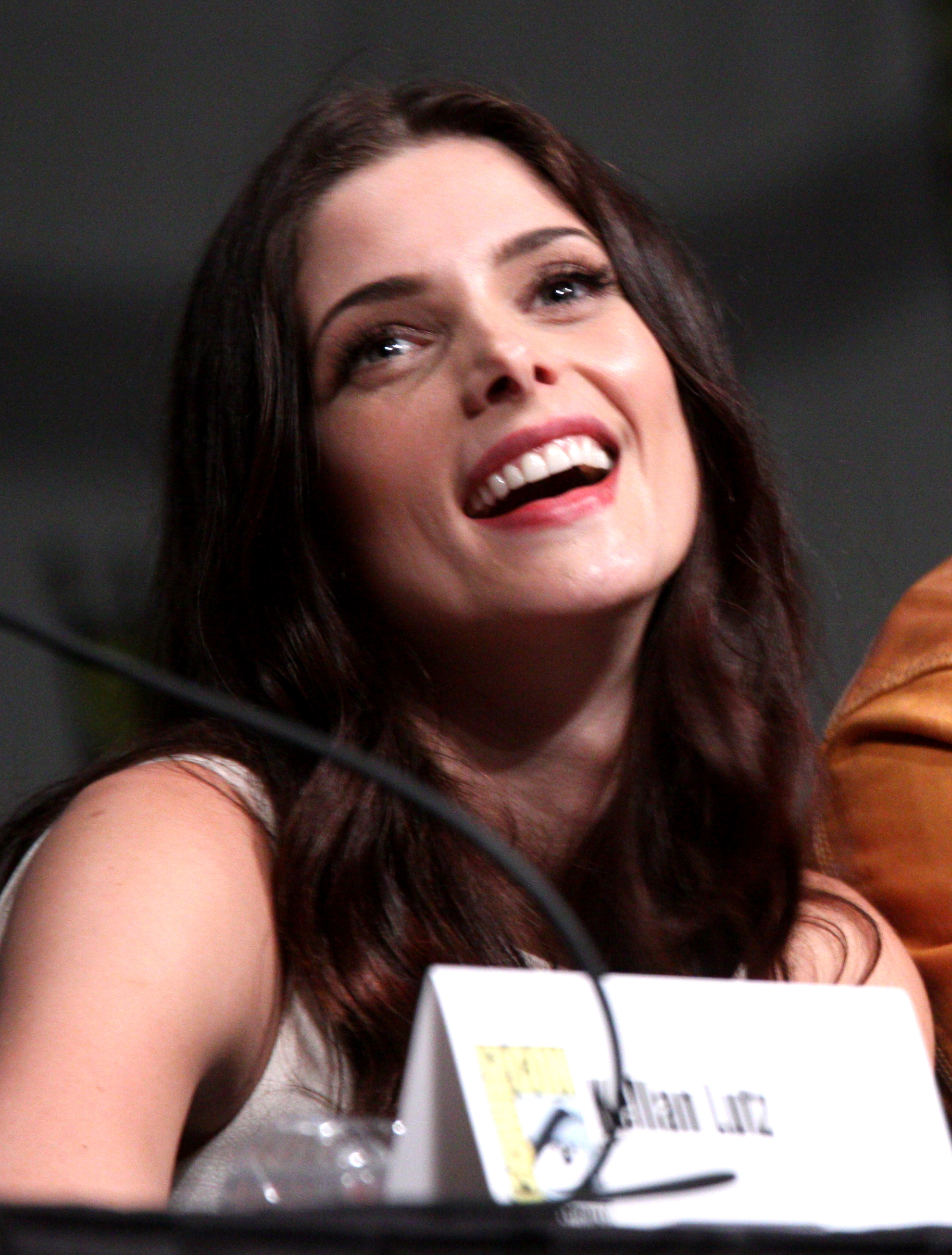
Greene at San Diego Comic-Con in July 2012

=== Film ===
Year	Title	Role	Notes
2007	King of California	McDonald's Customer	
2008	Otis	Kim #4	
2008	Twilight	Alice Cullen	
2009	Shrink	Missy	
2009	Summer's Blood	Summer Matthews	
2009	The Twilight Saga: New Moon	Alice Cullen	
2010	Skateland	Michelle Burkham	
2010	The Twilight Saga: Eclipse	Alice Cullen	
2010	Radio Free Albemuth	Rhonda	
2011	A Warrior's Heart	Brooklyn Milligan	
2011	Butter	Kaitlin Pickler	
2011	The Twilight Saga: Breaking Dawn – Part 1	Alice Cullen	
2012	LOL	Ashley	
2012	The Apparition	Kelly	
2012	The Twilight Saga: Breaking Dawn – Part 2	Alice Cullen	
2013	CBGB	Lisa Kristal	
2014	Wish I Was Here	Janine	
2014	Kristy	Violet	
2014	Burying the Ex	Evelyn Morrison	
2015	Staten Island Summer	Krystal Manicucci	
2015	Shangri-La Suite	Priscilla Presley	
2016	Urge	Theresa	
2016	In Dubious Battle	Danni Stevens	
2016	Max & Me	Rachel	Voice role
2018	Accident Man	Charlie Adams	
2018	Antiquities	Ellie	
2019	Bombshell	Abby Huntsman	
2020	Blackjack: The Jackie Ryan Story	Jenny Burke	
2021	Aftermath	Natalie Dadich	Streaming film
2021	One Shot	Zoe Anderson	as Ashley Greene Khoury
2022	Wrong Place	Chloe Richards	
2022	The Immaculate Room	Simone	
2023	The Retirement Plan	Ashley	
2023	Some Other Woman	Renata	
2023	Inside Man	Mary Belucci	
2025	It Feeds	Cynthia	
2025	The Ritual	Sister Rose	
TBA	Eyes in the Trees	Channing Arneau	Post-production

=== Television ===
Year	Title	Role	Notes
2006	Crossing Jordan	Ann Rappaport	Episode: "The Elephant in the Room"
2006	Mad TV	Amber	Episode 11.17
2006	Desire	Renata	Recurring role, 7 episodes
2008	Shark	Natalie Faber	Episode: "Partners in Crime"
2011–2012	Pan Am	Amanda Mason	Recurring role, 5 episodes
2012	Americana	Alice Garano	Unsold television pilot
2016	Hell's Kitchen	Herself	Chef's table guest for the red team; Episode: "Dancing in the Grotto"
2016–2017	Rogue	Mia Rochland	Main role (seasons 3–4)
2019	Christmas on My Mind	Lucy Lovett	Television film
2020	The Charm Bracelet	Holly Hayes	Television film; as Ashley Greene Khoury
2024	Wild Cards	Wendy	Episode: "Dead of Night"
2024	Deck the Walls	Rose Demonte	Television film
2026	Wonder Man	Herself	Episode: "Matinee"

=== Music video, video game, and web series ===
Year	Title	Role	Notes
2005	Lyudi Invalidy / Dangerous and Moving	N/A	Music video for t.A.T.u
2015	Batman: Arkham Knight	Barbara Gordon / Oracle / Batgirl	Video game; voice role
2019	Step Up: High Water	Nine Sanders	Web series; recurring role

== Awards and nominations ==
Year	Work	Association	Category	Result	Ref.
2009	Twilight	Teen Choice Awards	Choice Movie: Fresh Face Female	Won	
2009	Twilight	Scream Awards	Best Supporting Actress	Nominated	
2009	Twilight	Scream Awards	Best Ensemble Cast	Nominated	
2010	The Twilight Saga: New Moon	Teen Choice Awards	Scene Stealer Female	Won	
2010	The Twilight Saga: New Moon	Teen Choice Awards	Most Fanatic Fans (Shared with cast)	Won	
2010	Herself	Young Hollywood Awards	The Style Icon Award	Won	
2011	The Twilight Saga: Eclipse	Teen Choice Awards	Scene Stealer Female	Won	
2012	The Twilight Saga: Breaking Dawn – Part 1	Teen Choice Awards	Scene Stealer Female	Won	
2012	Herself	Young Hollywood Awards	Female Superstar of Tomorrow	Won	
