= A Warrior's Heart =

2011 film by Michael F. Sears

- Theatrical release poster
- Directed by: Michael F. Sears
- Written by: Martin Dugard
- Produced by: Steven Istock; Marc Spizzirri
- Starring: Kellan Lutz; Adam Beach; Gabrielle Anwar; Ashley Greene
- Cinematography: Thomas L. Callaway
- Edited by: Ellen Goldwasser
- Music by: Alec Puro
- Production companies: California Pictures; Camelot Entertainment; Family Productions
- Distributed by: Xenon Pictures
- Release dates: May 13, 2011 (Cannes Film Festival); December 2, 2011 (United States)
- Running time: 98 minutes
- Country: United States
- Language: English

A Warrior's Heart is an American 2011 romantic sports drama film directed by Michael F. Sears and written by Martin Dugard. It stars Kellan Lutz, Adam Beach, Gabrielle Anwar and Ashley Greene.

The film was released at the 2011 Cannes Film Festival on May 13, 2011 and in limited theaters on December 2, 2011.

== Plot ==
Star lacrosse player Conor Sullivan is not excited about moving to an unknown town and being the new kid at high school. He has a new love interest, Brooklyn, but he struggles to find a meaning to his life.

Conor's Marine father Seamus is redeployed into Iraq where he dies in combat leaving Conor in shock and denial as he starts acting out in self-destructive ways. This greatly worries his mother Claire. There is also a violent on-field clash with ahis long-time nemesis, Dupree, and a vandalism incident that lands him in a jail cell and finally gets him kicked off the team. To regain his obvious passion for the sport, he goes for arduous training in a wilderness lacrosse camp. The camp is under the tutelage of his dead father's old combat buddy, Sgt. Major Duke Wayne, who opens Conor's eyes to the true meaning of maturity, sportsmanship and manhood.

== Cast ==
- Kellan Lutz as Conor Sullivan
- Adam Beach as Sgt. Major Duke Wayne
- Ashley Greene as Brooklyn
- Gabrielle Anwar as Claire Sullivan
- Chord Overstreet as Dupree
- William Mapother as David Milligan
- Aaron Hill as Joe Bryant
- Chris Potter as Lt. Col Seamus 'Sully' Sullivan
- Jay Hayden as JP Jones
- Ridge Canipe as Keegan Sullivan
- Daniel Booko as Powell

== Release ==
The film was presented at the 2011 Cannes Film Festival on May 13, 2011. It had a limited release in the United States on December 2, 2011.

== Critical reception ==
On the review aggregator website Rotten Tomatoes, 17% of 12 critics' reviews are positive, with an average rating of 3.4/10.
