= Barbara Niven =

American actress (born 1953)

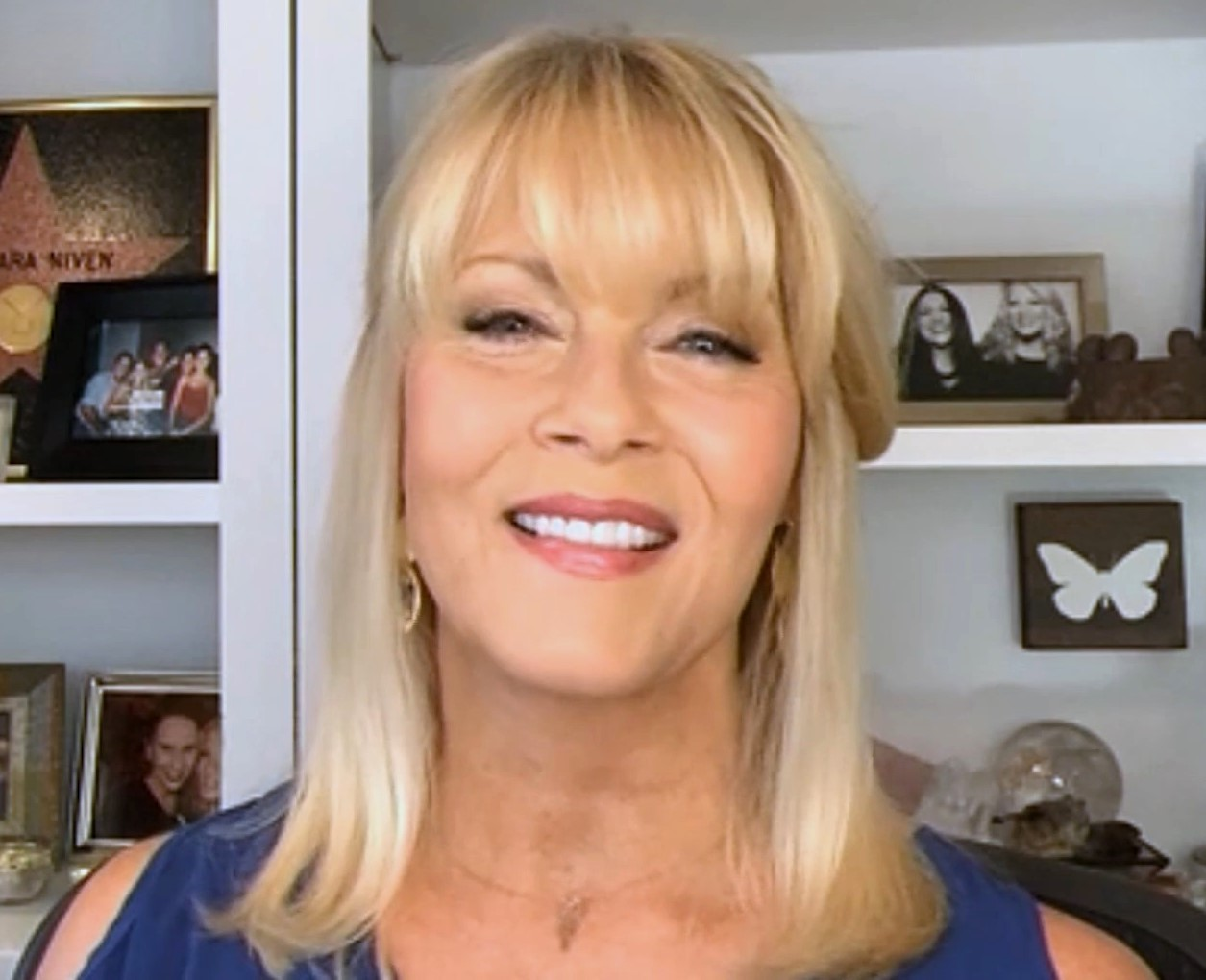
- Niven in 2021
- Born: Barbara Lee Bucholz; February 26, 1953 (age 73); Portland, Oregon, U.S.
- Other names: Barby Bucholz; Barbara Lee Alexander; Barbara Lee Niven
- Citizenship: United States; Canada
- Occupations: Actress; writer; media trainer; animal rights spokesperson; motivational speaker
- Years active: 1986–present
- Spouses: Ronald Garrison (m. 1974, divorced); David Alexander (m. 1985, divorced); David Niven Jr. (m. 1993; div. 1998)
- Children: 1
- Website: Official website

Barbara Lee Niven (née Bucholz; born February 26, 1953) is an American actress, writer, and producer, best known for her performances in Hallmark and Lifetime movies, and for television roles in Pensacola: Wings of Gold, One Life to Live, Cedar Cove, and Chesapeake Shores. Niven had the leading role in the independent film A Perfect Ending (2012). She is also a motivational speaker, media trainer and animal rights activist, and a National Ambassador for American Humane.

== Early life and education ==
Barbara Lee Bucholz was born in 1953 in Portland, Oregon, to parents George and Edie Bucholz. She has two sisters, Shelley and Kim, and attended David Douglas High School. She has stated that she knew when she was five that she wanted to be an actress. She grew up hunting and fishing and was a senior in high school before she got involved in acting.

After high school, she attended college for six months, worked as export coordinator for a foundry, a general contractor, sold commercial real estate, and modelled. She married at twenty-one and had a business with her husband. Niven became a mother at twenty-six. After a divorce, and with no child support, she found a place to live with roommates to help with expenses.

Her ten-year high school reunion committee mailed a questionnaire, with the final inquiry being, "have you achieved everything in your life that you thought you would by now?" The realization that she had not started acting made Niven declare to herself that she was "going to be an actor" and "going to be in show business somehow." Acknowledging a penchant for being on camera and knowing that she enjoyed writing, she decided to look for a job in news reporting.

== Career ==
=== Getting started ===
Niven went to see the news director at KGW in Portland and asked to make sample stories for him to critique. She promised to ‘pay it forward’ if she had a successful career. He agreed and provided a typical script. She was later hired as an intern, and her story about the White House Easter Egg Roll made the network news.

She spent hours reading from the theater section of Powell's Books and memorized a monologue from Neil Simon's Chapter Two. In the early 1980s, there was a nationwide search to replace the character Tina Lord on One Life to Live. One audition was held in Seattle. Niven drove in freezing rain from Portland, taped the monologue, and drove back home without telling anyone what she had done. She was one of several people chosen to go to New York for a screen test.

In New York she was told by Mari Lyn Henry, then ABC casting director, that she did not have star quality and her voice would only lead to victims' roles. She went back to Portland determined to work on her voice and her craft. She got a retired radio man to be her voice coach. She was cast in Hallmark Hall of Fame’s 1986 Promise, which filmed in Oregon. She received her SAG card on this movie. When her daughter was ten, she packed their belongings into a truck and trailer and moved to Los Angeles.

=== Television and film ===
For twelve years, she attended the master classes of Milton Katselas at the Beverly Hills Playhouse. Between 1986 and 1993 she was billed as Barbara Lee Alexander, and as Barbara Lee Niven for the film Lone Tiger (1994).^{see Filmography} She is known for her roles on soap operas The Bold and the Beautiful as Brenda Dickerson, and in One Life to Live as Liz Coleman Reynolds.

She served for three years on the National Board of Directors for the Screen Actors Guild. From 20 March – 8 September 1989, she was hostess and announcer, with host Michael Burger, for the syndicated game show, Straight to the Heart. In 2000, served as a celebrity blue-team contestant for St. Thomas on Search Party.

Niven starred on the syndicated drama series Pensacola: Wings of Gold (1998-2000). Niven also has appeared in guest roles on numerous television series, including ER, Cold Case, Las Vegas, NCIS, Charmed, Eli Stone, and Parks and Recreation. Additionally, she had multiple roles on Silk Stalkings, and a recurring role on Pacific Palisades.

She played Marilyn Monroe in the HBO film The Rat Pack (1998) and has appeared in many films such as Under Lock and Key (1995), Forest Warrior (1996), Foxfire (1996), Breast Men (1997), The Drone Virus (2004), Chasing Ghosts (2005), Redline (2007), and Summer's Blood (2009). She had the leading role in A Perfect Ending (2012) and co-starred with Kat Dennings and Ray Wise in the horror comedy Suburban Gothic (2014).

Niven has also appeared in over a dozen Lifetime movies, including Stranger in My Bed (2005), The Perfect Neighbor (2005), Double Cross (2006), Murder in My House (2006), The Rival (2006), A Valentine Carol (2007), Black Widow (2008), Dead at 17 (2008), Accused at 17 (2009), Heat Wave (2009), My Mother's Secret (2012), Home Invasion (2012), The Wife He Met Online (2012), and Disney Channel's Tiger Cruise (2004).

She has multiple credits for Hallmark, starting with her first role in Hallmark Hall of Fame's Promise (1986), with James Garner and James Woods. Among other appearances, there are A Carol Christmas (2003), Wedding Daze (2004), Back to You and Me (2005), Mystery Woman: Wild West Mystery (2006), McBride: Semper Fi (2007), and Moonlight & Mistletoe (2008). In 2013, Niven was cast in Hallmark Channel's first original drama series Cedar Cove, opposite Andie MacDowell and Bruce Boxleitner. Niven is currently appearing in the series Chesapeake Shores with Treat Williams and Diane Ladd. For Hallmark Movies & Mysteries, she has been cast in the Murder, She Baked and Crossword Mysteries movies.

=== Speaker and coach ===
Barbara Niven has made motivational speeches and said that if she could become an actor as a single mother at thirty, others can also fulfill their dreams. She has spoken to school classes, professional groups, and on television shows. The subjects have included: "Giving up Perfect to Claim Your Dreams", "Paralyzed to Powerful" (tips to save yourself from a stalker), "Eating Disorders & Pressures to be Perfect", and "The Pressure to be Thin in Hollywood".

She has done media training for individuals and corporations. Niven has a studio and developed workshops to educate people to make a positive impression with speaking, presentation, and media video. Her instructions include: for presentations, consciously create a character with voice, use good lighting, and connect heart to heart; and when performing, build relationships, be a personal producer and the welcoming person in the room. She says, "the older one gets the more beautiful tools and instruments you have to add to your orchestra and your palette".

She has described her writing process as do anything but write, clean the desk, then write from the heart and let the words flow.

== Personal life ==
Niven has been married three times, to Ronald Garrison (m. 1974, divorced), David Alexander (m. 1985, divorced), and David Niven Jr. (m. 19 June 1993, div. 1998). She has a daughter, Jessica, and three grandchildren. She obtained dual Canadian citizenship because her father was born in Canada. Her favorite color is red, although she likes to wear black. She prefers sweats to fancy dresses.

For 30 years, between 15 and 45, she suffered from bulimia. Her older sister asked about it, and she got help after her daughter fainted at cheerleading practice. Others on the squad were also bulimic/anorexic. Niven promptly got them both help. She says, "secrets are what kept me sick." Once the secret was out, it no longer controlled her. Eating disorders is a topic about which she gives presentations that garner positive feedback.

She supports human rights causes and programs that speak out against bullying. Niven appeared in She4ME ('She' for Marriage Equality), the 2014 five-minute public service video created in support. She has been a proponent of the 2012 seventeen-minute anti-bullying short Love is All You Need?, and its purpose in asking viewers to see themselves as a minority.

Niven is an animal rights activist and spokesperson. She has a four-legged family of dogs and cats at home, and fosters older pets. She has participated on an animal rescue team to save victims of a puppy mill, and is a National Ambassador for American Humane.

== Filmography ==
Film and television
Year	Title	Role	Notes
1986	Promise	Joan ^{a}	Television film [Hallmark Hall of Fame]
1989	My Two Dads	Veronica Miles ^{a}	Episode: "Duel"
1990	Equal Justice	Maggie Sue ^{a}	Episode: "Balancing Act"
1990	Hired to Kill	Sheila Rogers ^{a}	
1990	Fatal Encounter	Laura ^{a}	
1992	Wings	Susan ^{a}	Episode: "The Fortune Cookie"
1993	Psycho Cop Returns	Sharon Wells ^{a}	
1993	Illegal Entry: Formula for Fear	Pamela Raby ^{a}	
1993–1998	Silk Stalkings	Cally Henshaw ^{a} Amanda Langley; Jackie McMillan; Sally Coats	Episodes: "Night Games" (‘93) "The Party’s Over" (‘93) "Pulp Addiction" (‘95) "The Party" (‘98)
1994	Lone Tiger	Jane Costello ^{n}	
1995	Renegade	Tammy Watkins	Episode: "Rancho Escondido"
1995	The Sister-in-Law	Ashley Hawkins	Television film [USA Network]
1995	Under Lock and Key	Tina Lamb	Television film [Showtime]
1995	Taken Alive	Veronica	
1996	Foxfire	Goldie's stepmother	
1996	Humanoids from the Deep	Fran Taylor	Television film [Showtime]
1996	Forest Warrior	Stacy Franklin	
1996	Depraved	Monica Stienman	
1996	The Bold and the Beautiful	Brenda Dickerson	Recurring role
1997	Pacific Palisades	Evelyn Cabot	Recurring role, 4 episodes: "Past & Present Danger", "Desperate Measure", "Best Laid Plans", "Private Showing"
1997	Breast Men	Cindy	Television film [HBO]
1997	Doublecross on Costa's Island	Veronica	
1998	Mike Hammer, Private Eye	Connie Paley	Episode: "Dead Men Talk"
1998	The Rat Pack	Marilyn Monroe	Television film [HBO]
1998	I Married a Monster	Linda Harris	Television film [UPN]
1998–2000	Pensacola: Wings of Gold	Kate Anderson	Series regular, 43 episodes
1999	Love Boat: The Next Wave	Elise Daley	Episode: "Prom Queen"
1999	Anoosh of the Airways	Suzy	
1999	Born Bad	Brian's mother	
2000	Luminarias	Jan	
2001	Alone with a Stranger	Sandy Kennington	
2002	ER	Stephanie	Episode: "Bygones"
2002–2003	One Life to Live	Liz Coleman Reynolds	Recurring role
2003	A Carol Christmas	Morgan Maddox	Television film [Hallmark]
2004	Serial Killing 4 Dummys	Donna Noland	
2004	Cold Case	Mavis Breen	Episode: "Greed"
2004	Las Vegas	Alice Gold	Episode: "The Strange Life of Bob"
2004	Tiger Cruise	Kate Dolan	Television film [Disney]
2004	Wedding Daze	News Reporter	Television film [Hallmark]
2004	The Drone Virus	Dr. Sloan	
2005	The Perfect Neighbor	Donna Germaine	Television film [Lifetime]
2005	Back to You and Me	Connie Murray	Television film [Hallmark]
2005	Stranger in My Bed	Christine Goudet	Television film [Lifetime]
2005	Chasing Ghosts	Patricia King	
2005	NCIS	Dr. Elaine Burns	Episode: "Silver War"
2006	Double Cross	Suzanne Debson	Television film [Lifetime]
2006	Mystery Woman: Wild West Mystery	Annie Boone	Television film [Hallmark]
2006	Charmed	Helen Jenkins	Episodes: "Mr. & Mrs. Witch" and "Generation Hex"
2006	Murder in My House	Lauren Kessler	Television film [Lifetime]
2006	All You've Got	Peggy McDonald	Television film [MTV]
2006	The Rival	Linda Zeller	Television film [Lifetime]
2007	McBride: Semper Fi	Claire Whitman	Television film [Hallmark]
2007	A Valentine Carol	Jackie Marley	Television film [Lifetime]
2007	Redline	Sally Martin	
2007	The Minor Accomplishments of Jackie Woodman	Anne O'Connell	Episode: "We're Number Two!"
2008	Eli Stone	Ellen Wethersby	Episodes: "Pilot" and "Father Figure"
2008	Black Widow	Tiffany Collins	Television film [Lifetime]
2008	Dead at 17	Alyssa Harris	Television film [Lifetime]
2008	Never Enough: Sex, Money and Parking Garages in San Francisco	Sylvia Chaisem	
2008	Short Track	Audrey Beckett	
2008	Moonlight & Mistletoe	Ginny	Television film [Hallmark]
2009	Heat Wave	Governor Carol Quinlan	Television film [Lifetime]
2009	Anti-Narcotics	Capt. Chandler	
2009	Back to the Horn	Capt. Chandler	
2009	Let's Make a Deal	Capt. Chandler	
2009	Summer's Blood	Gaia Hoxey	
2009	Accused at 17	Claire Werner	Television film [Lifetime]
2009	The Alpha Geek	Maggie Malone	
2012	My Mother's Secret	Evelyn Wells	Television film [Lifetime]
2012	Home Invasion	Tricia Patterson	Television film [Lifetime]
2012	The Wife He Met Online	Alma	Television film [Lifetime]
2012	A Perfect Ending	Rebecca Westridge	
2012	Gabe the Cupid Dog	Ms. Andrews	
2013	Meth Head	Madelaine	
2013	Being Us	Julie	
2013–2015	Cedar Cove	Peggy Beldon	Series regular, 25 episodes
2014	The M Word	Nicki	
2014	Suburban Gothic	Eve	
2015	Parks and Recreation	June Hartwell	Episode: "Pie-Mary"
2015	Murder, She Baked: A Chocolate Chip Cookie Mystery	Delores Swensen	Television film [Hallmark Movies & Mysteries]
2015	Murder, She Baked: A Plum Pudding Mystery	Delores Swensen	Television film [Hallmark Movies & Mysteries]
2015	A Christmas Detour	Susan Collins	Television film [Hallmark]
2015	Hamlet's Ghost	Sarah Goodman	
2016	Murder, She Baked: A Peach Cobbler Mystery	Delores Swensen	Television film [Hallmark Movies & Mysteries]
2016	Murder, She Baked: A Deadly Recipe	Delores Swensen	Television film [Hallmark Movies & Mysteries]
2016–2022	Chesapeake Shores	Megan O'Brien	Series regular
2017	Campfire Kiss	Beverly Gowers	Television film [Hallmark]
2017	Murder, She Baked: Just Desserts	Delores Swensen	Television film [Hallmark Movies & Mysteries]
2017	Christmas In Evergreen	Carol Shaw	Television film [Hallmark]
2018	Christmas In Evergreen: Letters to Santa	Carol Shaw	Television film [Hallmark]
2019	Love on the Menu	Andrea Fitzgerald	Television film [Hallmark]
2019	Crossword Mysteries: A Puzzle to Die For	Aunt Candace	Television film [Hallmark Movies & Mysteries]
2019	Love Takes Flight	Virginia Beauman	Television film [Hallmark Hall of Fame]
2019	Crossword Mysteries: Proposing Murder	Aunt Candace	Television film [Hallmark Movies & Mysteries]
2019	Christmas in Evergreen: Tidings of Joy	Carol Shaw	Television film [Hallmark]
2020	Crossword Mysteries: Abracadaver	Aunt Candace	Television film [Hallmark Movies & Mysteries]
2020	USS Christmas	Elizabeth Contino	Television film [Hallmark Movies & Mysteries]
2020	Christmas in Evergreen: Bells Are Ringing	Carol Shaw	Television film [Hallmark]
2021	Crossword Mysteries: Terminal Descent	Aunt Candace	Television film [Hallmark Movies & Mysteries]
2021	Crossword Mysteries: Riddle Me Dead	Aunt Candace	Television film [Hallmark Movies & Mysteries]
2021	Sweet Revenge: A Hannah Swensen Mystery	Delores Swensen	Television film [Hallmark Movies & Mysteries]
2021	The Christmas Contest	Donna	Television film [Hallmark]
2022	North to Home	Suzanne McBride	Television film [Hallmark Movies & Mysteries]
2022	Christmas at the Golden Dragon	Jane	Television film [Hallmark] - 13 November
2023	Carrot Cake Murder: A Hannah Swensen Mystery	Delores	Television film [Hallmark]
2023	A Zest for Death: A Hannah Swensen Mystery	Delores	Television film [Hallmark]
2023	Ms. Christmas Comes to Town	Gale / Ms. Christmas	Television film [Hallmark]

^{a} as Barbara Lee Alexander ^{n} as Barbara Lee Niven

== Theatre ==
Year	Title	Role	Notes
1998	Psychopathia Sexualis	Lucille	Zoo Theatre, Hollywood, CA
2019	The Last Word	Jillian	Garry Marshall Theatre, Burbank, CA

== Video games ==
Year	Title	Voice role	Notes
1994	Wing Commander III: Heart of the Tiger	Barbara Miles	Newscaster
1995	Wing Commander IV: The Price of Freedom	Barbara Miles	News anchor

== Books ==
=== Author ===
- Niven, Barbara (2011). 111 Star Power Tips – Insider Secrets from a Hollywood Pro : For Videos, Audios, On-Camera Interviews, TV, Radio & Presentations. Shadoeworks. ISBN 978-1460912331.

=== Contributor ===
- Niven, Barbara (2006). "Barbara Niven [actor]". In Stromberg, Gary; Merrill, Jane. Feeding the Fame : Celebrities Tell Their Real-Life Stories of Eating Disorders. Hazelden. pp. 96–107. ISBN 1-59285-350-1.
- Niven, Barbara (2009). "ACT AS IF!". In Kingsbury, Gail (ed.). How Did You Do That! Stories of Going for It. Yinspire Media. pp. 99–104. ISBN 978-0-9819708-8-2.
- Niven, Barbara (2011). "Shine Your Light", In Lim, Kimber (ed.). Get Your Woman On! Embracing Beauty, Grace & the Power of Women. Yinspire Media. pp. 41–46. ISBN 978-0-9819708-3-7.
- Niven, Barbara (2013). "A Perfect Ending...and a New Beginning", In Mayfield, Karen (ed.). Wake Up Women Be You : Spread Your Wings and Fly Emotionally. Wake Up Women. pp. 32–39. ISBN 978-1508705420.
- Niven, Barbara (2015). "Success, Goosebumps & Your Next Evolution". In Allen, Debbie (ed.). Experts Wisdom : Life Changing Principles and Transformational Business Strategies from the Go-To Authorities. Authentic Endeavors Publishing. pp. 203–218. ISBN 978-0-692-52264-6.
- Niven, Barbara (2016). "Taking a Leap of Faith, Dreams, Money, & Show Biz" In Giankas, Patricia (ed.). Great Credit Now : Set Your GPS for Positive Success. Authentic Endeavors Publishing. pp. 105–116. ISBN 978-0-9982105-0-6.

== Sources ==
- Riggs, Thomas, ed. (2003). Contemporary Theatre, Film & Television, Vol. 48. Thomson Gale. ISBN 0-7876-6363-8.
- Stromberg, Gary; Merrill, Jane (2006). Feeding the Fame : Celebrities Tell Their Real-Life Stories of Eating Disorders. Hazelden. ISBN 1-59285-350-1.
- Serafini, Marisa (31 October 2016). "Barbara Niven Interview". AfterBuzz (Podcast).
- Rachel (5 August 2018). "Actress Barbara Niven Interview". Hallmarkies Podcast (Podcast).
- Johnson, Melissa (30 April 2019). "How to Live Your Dreams with Barbara Niven". Best Friends For Frosting (Podcast). Archived from the original on 22 September 2020.
- Jacks and Shawl (21 August 2019). "Barbara Niven Interview-Chesapeake Shores". Hallmark Channels' Bubbly Sesh (Podcast).

== Additional reading ==
- Markel, Adam (2016). Pivot : The Art and Science of Reinventing Your Career and Life. Atria Books. [see index]. ISBN 978-1-4767-7947-8.
