= Eyes in the Trees =

American science-fiction film

- Directed by: Timothy Woodward Jr.
- Screenplay by: B. Harrison Smith; Mike Manning
- Based on: The Island of Dr. Moreau by H.G. Wells
- Produced by: Artisha Mann-Cooper; Daemon Hillin; Sasha Yelaun
- Starring: Anthony Hopkins; Jonathan Rhys Meyers; Ashley Greene; Thomas Kretschmann; Praya Lundberg
- Cinematography: Christopher Duddy
- Edited by: David Freeman
- Music by: Daniel Figueiredo
- Production companies: Ashland Hill Media Finance; Artman Cooper Productions; Hillin Entertainment; BGG Capital; Everbright Pictures; Light in the Dark Productions
- Country: United States
- Language: English

Eyes in the Trees is an upcoming American science fiction horror film starring Anthony Hopkins. It is a reimagining of the H.G. Wells 1896 novel The Island of Dr. Moreau, from director Timothy Woodward Jr.

== Premise ==
An investigation takes place on Monkey Ko, a Thai island known as ‘The Island of Death’ by locals, by a team of investigative journalists amid rumours of medical experiments and genetic manipulations.

== Cast ==
- Anthony Hopkins as Dr. Addis
- Jonathan Rhys Meyers as Vince Henway
- Ashley Greene as Channing Arneau
- Thomas Kretschmann
- Praya Lundberg as Elle

== Production ==
The film is a reimagining of the H.G. Wells novel The Island of Dr. Moreau, from director Timothy Woodward Jr. The script for the film was written by B. Harrison Smith and Mike Manning. Artisha Mann-Cooper, Daemon Hillin, and Sasha Yelaun are producers.

Anthony Hopkins leads the cast of the film. Jonathan Rhys Meyers, Ashley Greene, Thomas Kretschmann, Praya Lundberg joined the cast in August 2024.

Footage from principal photography filmed in Los Angeles of Hopkins was hacked; the extortionists ordered the producers to pay a ransom of $200,000 for the return of the footage by July 22, 2024. The film's producer Daemon Hillin contacted the FBI and the Santa Monica Police Department, along with local and state politicians about the breach, and said they would not pay, but were proceeding with the production.
