= Camelot Entertainment Group =

American media company

Camelot Entertainment Group, Inc.
- Industry: Entertainment
- Headquarters: 300 Spectrum Center Drive, Suite 400, Irvine, California 92618, United States
- Key people: Robert Atwell (Chairman)

Camelot Entertainment Group, Inc. ("CMGR"), is a public company based in Irvine, California, with three subsidiaries: Camelot Films, Camelot Distribution Group, including DarKnight Pictures, and Camelot Studio Group. Camelot is in the process of rebuilding its production and distribution subsidiaries as it continues to work on its Studio Group developments. As of March 1, 2018, Camelot is working toward filing a new S-1 Registration Statement in order to regain its fully reporting status and resume trading. The company has not traded since July 23, 2013, when it was unable to complete its annual and quarterly filing requirements due to lack of funding. In the interim, the company has divested itself of most of the titles it was representing for distribution as part of an overall restructuring. In addition to divesting the film library acquired in 2010, the company has now worked through most of the prior legal issues that arose from the acquisition of the library and is now in a position to move forward with its S-1 Registration. Going forward, Camelot will focus on acquiring and producing content through its Camelot Films subsidiary, direct to consumer ("DTC") digital distribution domestically as it rebuilds its foreign sales operations through its Camelot Distribution Group subsidiary, and the launch of its long-planned Camelot Studio Group facility.

== Camelot Distribution Group Films ==
- Wiener Dog Nationals (2013)
- Pythagoras' (2013)
- The Escape (2013)
- Privacy (2012)
- A Warrior's Heart (2011)
- Eliminate: Archie Cookson (2011)
- Skateland (2010)
- The Understudy (2009)
- The Perfect Game (2009)
- Next of Kin (2008)
- Fink! (2005)
- Mothers and Daughters (2004)

== DarKnight Pictures Films ==
- Scavengers (2012)
- Deliver Me to Hell (2012)
- Attack of the Herbals (2011)
- Never Sleep Again: The Elm Street Legacy (2010)
- Screwball: The Ted Whitfield Story (2009)

== Documentaries ==
- About Face: The Story of the Jewish Refugee Soldiers of World War II (2011)
- Never Sleep Again (2010)
- From Silence to Sound (2007)

== Unaudited financial information ==
The following unaudited financial information is subject to adjustment upon completion of the company's annual audit and review of prior years. The company is currently making arrangements to have its audit completed for fiscal years 2017 and 2016, which is expected to include reviews of the company's financial statements for fiscal year's 2010 through 2015.

As of December 31, 2012, the company had generated gross sales of $635,042. For the year ended December 31, 2011, the Company generated $1,700,000 in gross sales. For the year ended December 31, 2010, the Company generated $1,200,000 in gross sales. Gross sales are determined by the contracted sales price amount for films sold by the company.

As of December 31, 2012, the company had collected $972,978 in gross revenues thus far for the year ending December 31, 2012. For the year ended December 31, 2011, the Company collected $1,405,608 in gross revenue. For the year ended December 31, 2010, the Company collected $677,000 in gross revenue. In accordance with accounting standards for realizing gross revenue, the company can only record gross revenues after meeting all of the applicable accounting requirements, including the receipt of funds and the air or release date of the film having occurred.

As of March 1, 2018, the total issued and outstanding shares were 5,750,000,000. The total shares held in street name, also known as CEDE, were 346,746 shares. The total non-restricted shares held, including those non-restricted shares held by affiliates that are not currently available for resale, were 2,126,294,556 (including those held in CEDE). There were 3,623,705,444 restricted shares, of which 2,402,219,378 restricted shares were held by affiliates and 1,221,486,066 restricted shares were held by non-affiliates of the company. Of the 1,221,486,066 restricted shares held by non-affiliates of the company, 1,221,486,066, or 100%, of those shares may be eligible for resale if and when applicable exemptions are available to the respective holders. As of March 1, 2018, there were 230 stockholders of record of the company's common stock, representing over 6500 stockholders. As of March 1, 2018, there were a total of 65,060,486 preferred shares issued and outstanding in the company's Class A, B, C, D, E, F and G Convertible Preferred Stock.

The company had been working toward completing the filing of its annual reports on Form 10-K and the subsequent quarterly reports on Form 10-Q. The company was unable to resolve certain items that would have a direct impact on the information required to be disclosed and the company's ability to file the report. The company was initially delayed in filing these reports due to a number of unforeseen factors that impacted its ability to collect and prepare the required information and audit confirmations from third parties, delays connected with the acquisition, maintenance and divestiture of the film libraries, the availability of certain professionals crucial to the timely completion of the annual and quarterly filings, the availability of funds, the acquisition and location of certain files and documents, operational issues, and the resolution of certain contemplated and filed legal actions by both the company and by third parties, most of which were related directly and/or indirectly to the acquisition of the film libraries transaction. These and other factors has created a heavy reporting burden on the company, requiring management to spend excessive time and effort preparing and reviewing old information instead of focusing on business operations and requiring the company to spend more money on outside counsel and auditors to help prepare the reports.

The company announced on July 23, 2013, that its stock had been temporarily halted from trading for a period of 10 days starting July 23, 2013, and ending on August 5, 2013. Camelot's stock was initially scheduled to resume trading on Tuesday, August 6, 2013. The trading halt was in connection with a public administrative hearing instituted by the Securities and Exchange Commission (”SEC”) because Camelot, a Delaware corporation located in Irvine, California with a class of securities registered with the Commission pursuant to Exchange Act Section 12(g), was delinquent in its periodic filings with the SEC, having not filed any periodic reports since it filed a Form 10 for the period ended September 30, 2010, which reported a net loss of $8,026,537 for the prior nine months. As of July 18, 2013, the common stock of Camelot was quoted on OTC Link, had ten market makers, and was eligible for the “piggyback” exception of Exchange Act Rule 15c2-11(f)(3).

On August 8, 2013, the Securities and Exchange Commission revoked registration of the shares of Camelot Entertainment Group "pursuant to Section 12(j) of the Securities and Exchange Act of 1934." As a result, Camelot Entertainment Group currently does not trade publicly as of August 8, 2013. In agreeing to the revocation of the registration, Camelot will be allowed to file a new registration statement and upon effectiveness Camelot will resume trading.

As of March 1, 2018, Camelot was in the process of preparing a new registration statement and expected to resume trading during fiscal year 2018.
