= Oracle (disambiguation) =

An oracle is a person or thing considered to provide wise and insightful counsel or prophetic predictions.

Oracle or The Oracle may also refer to:

== Arts, entertainment and media ==
=== Fictional entities ===
- Oracle (Marvel Comics), a fictional character
- Oracle, the DC Comics character Barbara Gordon
  - Gus Yale, a a Batman supporting character
- Oracle, the original alias of the DC Comics character who would be reimagined as Aurakles
- Oracle, in Spider Riders
- Oracle, in streaming TV series Dota: Dragon's Blood
- Oracle Inc., a company established by the Marvel character Namor
- The Oracle (The Matrix)
- The Oracle, a W.I.T.C.H. character
- The Oracle, in Aladdin and the King of Thieves
- The Oracle, in Casper Meets Wendy
- Oracle Turret, a Portal character
- Oracle, the codename for Futaba Sakura, a character from Persona 5

=== Film ===
- The Oracle (1953 film), or The Horse's Mouth, a British comedy film
- The Oracle (1985 film), an American horror film
- Oracle (film), a 2023 American horror thriller film

=== Television ===
- ORACLE (teletext), a British teletext service
- The Oracle (TV series), a 1979 Australian drama series

==== Episodes ====
- "An Oracle", Japan Sinks: 2020 episode 6 (2020)
- "Oracle", Endeavour season 7, episode 1 (2020)
- "Oracle", Sea of Souls series 3, episode 2 (2006)
- "Oracle", Smallville season 5, episode 21 (2006)
- "Oracle", Spellbinder: Land of the Dragon Lord episode 4 (1997)
- "The Oracle", Adventures of the Gummi Bears season 1, episode 5a (1985)
- "The Oracle", Blue Dragon season 2, episode 14 (2008)
- "The Oracle", Dr. Kildare season 3, episode 13 (1963)
- "The Oracle", MythQuest episode 8 (2001)
- "The Oracle", The Amazing World of Gumball season 3, episode 31 (2015)
- "The Oracle", Jayce and the Wheeled Warriors episode 59 (1985)

=== Literature ===
- Oracle, a 2010 novel by Jackie French
- "Oracle", a short story by Greg Egan, 2000
- The Oracle (novel), by Catherine Fisher, 2003
- The Oracle (University of South Florida), a student newspaper
- The Oracle (magazine), a defunct role-playing games magazine
- The Oracle, a 1951 novel by Edwin O'Connor
- The Oracle, a student newspaper of Hamline University, Saint Paul, Minnesota, U.S.
- The Oracle, a student newspaper of Stratford High School (Houston), Texas, U.S.
- The Oracles, a 1955 comic novel by Margaret Kennedy
- ORA:CLE, a 1984 novel by Kevin O'Donnell Jr.
- San Francisco Oracle, a 1960s underground newspaper

=== Music ===
- Oracles (band), a Belgian melodic death metal band
- Oracle (Gary Peacock and Ralph Towner album), 1993
- Oracle (Kittie album), 2001
- Oracle (Michael Hedges album), 1996
- Oracle (EP), by Sunn O))), 2007
- Oracles (album), by Fleshgod Apocalypse, 2009
- The Oracle (Cindy Blackman album), 1995
- The Oracle (Dark Sermon album), 2015
- The Oracle (Godsmack album), 2010
- The Oracle (Hank Jones album), 1989
- "The Oracle", a 2012 composition by Tony Banks
- "Oracle", a 2013 song by Scale the Summit
- "Oracle", a 2016 song by Timmy Trumpet

== Computing ==
- Oracle Corporation, a multinational computer technology company
  - Oracle Database, a database management system
- ORACLE (computer), an early computer
- Oracle machine, or oracle, in complexity theory and computability theory
- Blockchain oracle, a service that connects smart contracts with the outside world

== Places ==
- Oracle, Arizona, U.S.
- Oracle (workhouse), in Reading, England
- Oracle Arena, now Oakland Arena, in Oakland, California, U.S.
- The Oracle, Queensland, Australia, an apartment development
- The Oracle, Reading, England, a shopping mall

== Other uses ==
- Oracle (rocket), model rocket for aerial photography
- Oracle Team USA, an American yacht racing syndicate
- Internet Oracle, a collaborative humor website
- Oracle bone script, an ancient form of Chinese characters
- The Oracle (Fisher Towers), a sandstone tower in Utah, USA

== See also ==
- Auricle (disambiguation)
- Divination, the attempt to gain insight into a question or situation by way of an occultic, standardized process or ritual
- Revelation, the revealing of knowledge through communication with a deity or supernatural entity
- Fortune-telling, the practice of predicting information about a person's life
- Omen, a phenomenon that is believed to foretell the future
- Urim and Thummim in Judaism, a set of two objects used by the high priest to answer a question or reveal the will of God
