= Summer's Blood =

Summer's Moon
- Directed by: Lee Demarbre
- Written by: Christine Conradt; Sean Hogan
- Produced by: Curtis Crawford; Robert Menzies
- Starring: Ashley Greene; Peter Mooney; Stephen McHattie
- Cinematography: Ioana Vasile
- Edited by: Andre Coutu
- Release dates: November 2, 2009 (United Kingdom); November 10, 2009 (Canada)
- Country: Canada
- Language: English

Summer's Moon (also known as Summer and Summer's Moon) is a Canadian horror film directed by Lee Demarbre and starring Ashley Greene. It was released directly to DVD on November 10, 2009.

== Plot ==
One night while staying at a hotel, a man named Gant Hoxey (Stephen McHattie) rambles in bed about his family, stating that his wife gets worried whenever he doesn’t call her, and stresses the importance of family matters. When Gant addresses his female companion Sara Jean, it’s revealed that she’s already deceased with lacerations all over her body and nails ripped off from her fingertips. In remorse, Gant mentions that Sara Jean’s father would kill him for doing this heinous act to her, so people are “nothing without their family”.

One day, a wandering young woman named Summer Mathews (Ashley Greene) is hitchhiking along the side of the road when a man named Cliff pulls over. He asks her where she's going, and she tells him she’s heading to a small town called Massey; Cliff says he's going through that town and that it was no trouble. Maybe, for this favor, she would do a favor for him. Cliff expects Summer to pay him back by giving him oral sex. However, Summer pulls out a revolver and tells him to keep his eyes on the road. Summer is next seen in a gas station. Summer shoplifts food and accessories at the gas station convenience store in Massey. The local sheriff (Paul Whitney), who just walked out of the restroom, watches Summer from a distance. He approaches Summer, informing her that "people around here pay for their items." Summer throws down a rack of bottled water as a diversion. As she flees, the sheriff falls over the rack.

Summer runs outside, hiding behind a dumpster. A handsome young man named Tom Hoxey (Peter Mooney), who witnesses the incident, directs the sheriff to a different direction, and tells Summer to hide inside his truck. Summer is reluctant to accept Tom's offer, but he urges her to hurry up or else the sheriff will find her. Tom drives off with Summer. She asks Tom the reason he helps her to escape the sheriff. He claims the sheriff previously busted him for a drinking charge.

At a local bar, the two of them have a few drinks. They chat about Summer's travels. Summer is obviously a confident girl who can take care of herself. Although Summer asks to stay at a motel, smooth-talking Tom charms her into staying at his house for the night. Outside, they come across the town mechanic Jessie (Cinthia Burke). Summer asks how many times he slept with Jessie, but Tom states she’s “not his type”.

Tom takes Summer back to his house. Summer discovers that Tom lives with his security-conscious mother, Gaia (Barbara Niven), and that there are bolts on the windows. When Summer teases him about living with his mother, Tom confesses that he originally planned to move out, but misses his mother’s cooking. Tom is direct with Summer, so the two agree to go upstairs and have sex. As they are having sex, the audience then sees Gaia outside Tom's door, listening to him and Summer having sex.

In the morning, Summer wakes up and puts her clothes on. She scavenges the kitchen, taking money from a jar. Just as she was about to leave, Tom catches her in the kitchen. He tells Summer she can stay. Summer is not interested. She tells Tom he was good last night, and that she wanted to avoid the awkward morning goodbye. Tom refuses to let Summer leave, continually telling Summer she can't leave. Summer pulls out her revolver, threatening Tom to let her go or else she'll take action. Tom's mother Gaia smacks Summer on the back of her head with a blunt object. Tom shows his mother that in his hand are the bullets to Summer's revolver, reassuring her that he had it under control.

Meanwhile, an ex-convict named Darwin returns home, as he is released from jail. Upon entering the house, he calls out to his daughter, but there was no response and he doesn’t see her anywhere. Investigating, Darwin finds his house a mess, his pet bird is lifeless in its cage, and that there's rotten food in the fridge and on the table.

Later, Summer regains consciousness, and finds herself stored in the basement and chained to a dirtbed. A frail, battered, and barely conscious young woman named Amber (Danielle Kind), tied to a chair, is also held hostage (as well as the daughter of Darwin from the previous scene); the lack of sun is what's hurting Amber, not Tom. When Tom appears, Summer shouts and curses at him, but he tells her to calm down as not to upset Amber.

When Summer inquires how long Amber was kept in the basement, Tom states that she was kept there since the death of another woman named Clarissa. Tom then shows Summer the skull of the deceased Clarissa. Summer shouts that he’s a serial killer, and that he will never kill her. Tom, defends that he didn’t kill Clarissa, and he would never kill Summer because he doesn’t hurt and kill women. Instead, Tom states that she died from a spider bite. When Summer refuses to believe his claim, Tom angrily pins her down, and stresses that he didn’t kill Clarissa and he would never kill his girls.

The next day, Tom is at a clothing store where his mother works. When they notice Darwin outside, Gaia panics, knowing that he’ll inquire about Amber. Tom is nonchalant however, clarifying to his mother that Amber is known to be a runaway.

Back at Tom’s basement garden, Summer begs to be released, but Tom refuses, insisting that he needs her for his garden. Getting nowhere, Summer confesses to Tom that she’s searching for her long-estranged father in Massey. In response, Tom teases her that her father was there with him and his mother. Horrified and confused, Summer watches as Tom opens a large bin, and waves off a nonexistent odor. When Tom pours out the contents of the bin, only a garden hose slips out. Much to Summer’s relief, Tom suggests he’s just joking, and he doesn’t know her father. Summer tries to survive in the basement by antagonizing Tom when he offers her food cooked by his mother. She is defiant toward Tom and his mother.

Meanwhile, Darwin asks about Amber at the bar where Tom and Summer stopped by. The bar tender mentions that she hasn’t been there in a long while, but she used to go out with strangers back then.

The following day, Gaia tells Tom to get rid of the women in the basement and scolds him for taking Amber, someone who lives in their town. In response, Tom slams the counter and stresses to his mother that he’s not getting rid of his garden. Afterward, Tom assists Summer in drinking water and tells her he’ll be gone for a few hours to work. Before leaving, he plays music for them, making the crazed, delirious Amber laugh.

Later, Darwin asks the sheriff (who’s having lunch) whether he has heard from Amber, saying that he heard around town that Amber was hanging around Tom. The sheriff is biased toward Darwin, telling him that she probably just ran away, especially when Darwin mentions that her car and purse are gone. However, Darwin still pushes for the sheriff to look in case Amber is missing. Dismissively, the sheriff says he’ll look into her case when he’s finished eating.

Meanwhile, Summer talks to the weakened Amber, asking if she wants to die in the basement, though Amber can’t seem to speak anymore. During a supply run at Jessie’s shop, Tom gets a call from Darwin, asking him to stop by to check his oven (as it’s not working) since Tom is also a handyman. Playing it cool, Tom agrees he’ll be there.

When Tom returns home, Summer asks him how long he had the garden in the basement. Tom tells her that he’s been growing plants in his spare time since childhood because his father locked him in the basement as a punishment for misbehavior. In which Summer comments that his garden can still be beautiful without her and Amber. Tom disagrees with the comment, stating that women are the “most beautiful thing”, so they can bring life and beauty to his garden.

Tom then inquires about her mother, which Summer states that she and her mother don’t get along. Summer then recounts that she found a letter from her father, revealing that her mother Twila lied about losing her due to a miscarriage. Thus, her father doesn’t acknowledge her existence, that was when Summer left home. When Tom stresses that family is the most important value, Summer points out that he’s keeping her from her father just as her mother did. Tom then asks her father’s name, but Summer doesn’t know. Instead, she has an old photo of her father and hopes to find him through that. Summer then attempts to manipulate Tom, hinting that she can be the “special garden angel” he lets go, but he just walks away dismissively.

The next day, the sheriff visits Gaia at the clothing shop to make a purchase and starts flirting with her, stating that her husband has been gone for a long time. However, she brushes off his advances. When the sheriff mentions to Gaia that Darwin is worried about Amber's whereabouts. Feigning innocence, she tells the sheriff she hasn't seen Amber.

Back at home, Gaia drinks in stress, afraid of getting caught. Gaia feels that keeping the garden is too dangerous since Darwin is snooping around town. Tom, however, remains unbothered since he’s coming over to Darwin’s house to fix his stove, so he’ll set him straight. Gaia then slaps Tom, and demands that he get rid of the girls. In anger, Tom pins his mother onto the table, forcing her to give in and say that he is right, before kissing her. Gaia pushes him off, but touches herself while in tears after Tom leaves the kitchen.

While Tom is fixing Darwin’s stove, Darwin asks him about Amber. Tom tells him it’s been a couple months since he saw her. Tom then claims that Amber had mentioned wanting to see a music band, so he assumes that’s where she went.

Back in the garden, Summer attempts to communicate with Amber again. This time Amber regains some consciousness, and asks for her "Daddy.” Promising Amber to return her to her father, Summer pleads with her to grab the tools hanging on the wall. Amber, at first, is delirious, not understanding what Summer means. When she mentions her father, Summer uses this to make Amber get up and limp toward the tools, despite her feet being shackled. Amber manages to walk a few steps, trying to reach for one of the tools on the wall shelf. However, due to her weakened condition and her shackles, Amber trips and falls to the ground, hits her head on a concrete block, and dies upon impact.

When Tom returns home, he is pissed off that Amber died, as he takes any casualty seriously. While Tom buries Amber, Gaia expresses her dislike for Summer. Summer begs her to release her so she can be out of their lives, but Gaia notes that Tom’s garden is important to him.

After burying Amber’s body, Tom cries in grief. He then goes searching through Summer’s belongings in his bedroom, finding an old picture and her diary with the aforementioned letter inside, which forces Tom to realize that he only has one "garden angel" left. Tom then unlocks Summer from the chains, gives her a bath upstairs, and lets her sleep on his bed again.

The next morning, Summer tries to leave again. After that, Tom and his mother search Summer's purse and find an old letter. Whatever it is, upsets Gaia, and she goes downstairs, pulling Summer's chin back and forth before giving Summer permission to work upstairs while Tom is home. She must stay in the basement when Tom and Gaia are gone.

Tom's father Gant is on his way home, after calling that night that after she found the letter in Summer's purse. She sounds upset, he said, and he wants to know why. He realizes he has a surprise at home. Tom and Summer have sex again. Summer is obviously manipulating Tom, telling him she loved him when he told her to. The two talk about their future plans to leave. Tom wants to stay in the property, but Summer has other plans.

Jessie, who is a witness to Tom’s association with Amber, tells him that Darwin had stopped her auto shop by asking about his daughter and she mentioned seeing Amber with Tom. Tom decides to take Jessie hostage to prevent her from speaking to Darwin again. Tom is injured in the basement after Jessie, who he tied up, manages to get the ropes off her wrist and getting a knife from her ankle and stabs him on his leg. Tom asks Summer to give Jessie water. Jessie thinks Summer and the rest of the bunch are expecting her to become a sex slave. She agrees to do anything sexual, if only to survive. Summer begs Jessie to stay quiet, obviously scared for her. Jessie begs Summer not to leave her alone, but she's scared of Tom and goes back upstairs.

The next day, after Darwin goes to Jessie's auto shop and finds Tom's handyman cards on the ground after Jessie ripped his pocket, he drives to Tom's house. Summer attempts to escape as Darwin drives up to the front of the house. Summer enters Darwin's car, anxious to leave the property right away. Darwin asks Summer if his daughter is in the house, which Summer ignores as she’s in a rush to leave the Hoxey property. Tom shoots a perfect shot, blowing apart Darwin's head. Summer runs out of the car. She tries to escape on foot, but Tom shoots a shot next to her foot, and she pauses as Gaia pulls up, seeing the blood all over Summer and Darwin's car.

Summer is restrained again in the basement, to Jessie. Gant arrives home asking his wife where his daughter is. He visits downstairs to meet Summer for the very first time. Gant tells Summer that her mother, Twila, never told him about her existence, telling her that Twila told him she miscarried her. Summer connects the dots and realizes that Gant is her father. She came looking for her father; however, she finds a sadistic, femicidal wolf in sheep’s clothing. Gant guts and murders Jessie, forcing Summer to watch, after which he lets her go upstairs. The family have a cake celebrating Gant’s return. Tom defies his father, informing him he is not going to take Summer. Gant makes a joke that Tom is in love with his sister saying that "has a hard-on" for her. The next morning, as they're all sitting down for breakfast, Gant informs them that he's going to take Summer with him. Tom insists that he isn't, that Summer is going to stay with him. They fight, and Gant belittles him, calling him a "pussy" and throwing him into the next room.

Tom walks out with a shot gun and threatens his father, asking if he's a man now. Gant takes the gun from Tom, shooting him to death. Summer is shocked. Tom's mother is saddened to see her son dead. Gant also shoots Gaia dead after she realizes, and says that it was Gant's plan all along - to get rid of his old family to make a new one. He tells her that she's right, and forces Summer to leave with him. Gant and Summer leave the house. They drive to a nearby park. Gant approaches a woman who is having a picnic. Summer walks up to her father and stabs him to death. The mortified woman screams, pleading Summer not to kill her too. Summer tells the woman he was going to "kill you, and then me eventually."

== Cast ==
- Ashley Greene as Summer Mathews
- Peter Mooney as Tom Hoxey
- Barbara Niven as Gaia
- Stephen McHattie as Gant Hoxey
- Peter Michael Dillon as Darwin
- Cinthia Burke as Jessie
- Paul Whitney as the Sheriff
- Sean Tucker as Cliff
- Daniel Simpson as Bartender
- Teri Loretto as Twila
- Dani Kind as Amber
- Allison Graham as a Pretty Woman
