= Moonlight and Mistletoe =

- DVD cover
- Written by: Joany Kane; Duane Poole
- Story by: Joany Kane
- Directed by: Karen Arthur
- Starring: Candace Cameron Bure; Tom Arnold
- Theme music composer: Lawrence Shragge
- Country of origin: United States
- Original language: English
- No. of episodes: 1

Production
- Producers: Neal Stevens; Karen Mayeda Vranek
- Cinematography: Tom Neuwirth
- Editor: Bridget Durnford
- Running time: 90 minutes

Original release
- Network: Hallmark Channel
- Release: November 29, 2008

Moonlight and Mistletoe is a 2008 Christmas television film directed by Karen Arthur. The film premiered on Hallmark Channel on November 29, 2008.

== Plot ==
Holly Crosby (Candace Cameron Bure) is the daughter of Nick Crosby (Tom Arnold), the owner of Santaville, an amusement park focusing on Christmas, open 365 days a year. Fed up with being second fiddle to her father, who is devoted to the amusement park with all of his heart and soul, she leaves him in her teenage years. Years later, she is a successful businesswoman in the big city who is devoted to her work, but she does not have a social life. A few weeks before Christmas, she receives a call from Peter (Christopher Wiehl), her father's employee, informing her he was injured in a sleighing accident. Although she is estranged from her father, she immediately packs her bags and heads back to Santaville.

Holly does not plan on staying more than a few days. Her father, however, is delighted by her arrival and is enthusiastic about spending Christmas with her. This upsets Peter, who notices Holly's coldness and her apparent lack of interest in Christmas. Holly soon learns that Peter is the boy she met as a teenager in her father's gift shop, and that she inspired his interest in The Nutcracker. She is shocked to discover her father is near bankruptcy and that he may lose Santaville. She tries to prevent this, and although she has trouble arranging the needed financing, she softens up in the process, grows closer to Peter, and remembers the true meaning of Christmas.

During Holly's stay at Santaville, she meets Ben Richards (Matt Walton), a seemingly friendly financial adviser who decides to help her save her father's home and business. This makes Peter jealous, who has secretly fallen in love with Holly. She and Ben help Nick get a silent partner, but Nick is not interested. Upset and angry with him, Holly confronts him with being the second fiddle. He explains that he has trouble dealing with her mother's death and he has thrown himself completely into his work to avoid dealing with his grief. Eventually they reconcile and Nick finally allows her to help him.

Holly convinces Nick to sign a partnership with Ben, but she soon learns that Ben was only interested in Nick's money and that he tried to set him up. Realizing they will have to come up with $50,000 to save Santaville, the Crosbys start a nationwide promotion for the amusement park. Although a lot of people come to visit the park, it proves not to be enough to save Santaville. Through a selfless gesture, Peter saves the day by selling the Nutcracker carvings, which he hand-carved as his hobby, for a large commission. Nick kisses Ginny (Barbara Niven), a devoted employee who has been secretly in love with him for several years. In a voice-over, Holly announces that she has married Peter and that she is expecting to have his baby.

== Cast ==
- Candace Cameron Bure as Holly Crosby
- Tom Arnold as Nick Crosby
- Christopher Wiehl as Peter Lowdell
- Barbara Niven as Ginny
- Matt Walton as Ben Richards
- Richard Waterhouse as Mr. Jennings
- Heather Remick as Della Wallace
- Taylor Ampatiellos as Willy
- Lillian Pritchard as Teenage Holly
- Ari Larson as Teenage Peter
- Kaily Smith as Brenda
- Norris Cashman as Train Conductor
- Scott Whitney as Train Engineer

== Production ==
Candace Cameron Bure stated in an interview that she decided to do the film because of the simplicity of its story and that it, according to the actress, grabbed you by the heart. Filming took place in Chester, Vermont, in June 2008. A lot of fake snow had to be brought in to make it seem like it was winter. Bure said that the cast and crew had fun filming a Christmas film in the summer.

According to Bure, the film sparked Tom Arnold's departure from his sarcastic comedy roles. In an interview, she told she enjoyed working with Arnold, calling him a 'comedic genius'.

== See also ==
- List of Christmas films
