= Oracle (comics) =

Oracle, in comics, may refer to:

- Oracle, an alias used by DC Comics character Barbara Gordon
- Oracle, the original alias of the DC Comics character who would be reimagined as Aurakles
- Oracle (Marvel Comics), a Marvel character and member of the Shi'ar Imperial Guard
- Oracle Inc., a company established by the Marvel character Namor
- The Oracle, a W.I.T.C.H. character

== See also ==
- Oracle (disambiguation)
