= Larry the Lobster =

1982 sketch on Saturday Night Live

Larry the Lobster, and the 900-numbers that could decide his fate

Larry the Lobster was the subject of a comedy sketch by Eddie Murphy that was aired live on Saturday Night Live on April 10, 1982. In an early example of interactive television, Murphy held Larry, a live lobster, aloft and declared that the show's audience would determine by televoting whether Larry lived or died.

== Original episode ==
Murphy read two "900" phone numbers, one for those who wanted to spare Larry, and another for those who wanted to see him cooked. Calls cost $0.50 each. Murphy tended to read the number to save Larry very quickly, as opposed to his giving the number to cook Larry very slowly and clearly. Updates on the voting were given by other cast members over the course of the episode, in the span of whose 30 minutes viewers made nearly 500,000 calls, sending phone traffic soaring. Larry was initially spared by about 12,000 votes: 239,096 callers voted to save him and 227,452 for him to be boiled.

== Later episodes ==
On the following week's episode during NewsBreak, however, Eddie Murphy raised the subject of Larry the Lobster again, saying that he had received letters protesting the crustacean's treatment the previous week, including one that contained the racist barb "that man is sick, and I thought those people didn't like seafood." In response to the letters, Murphy announced that Larry's stay of execution had been revoked, and then displayed a boiled lobster on a plate before proceeding to eat it, giving pieces to NewsBreak anchors Brian Doyle-Murray and Christine Ebersole.

The following season, a similar sketch allowed viewers to call one of two numbers to decide whether or not to allow Andy Kaufman to continue appearing on the show. Several allusions to the Larry the Lobster sketch were made—Mary Gross at one point said it was "time to boil the water" when she saw that "Dump Andy" was in the lead.

== Impact ==
The heavy phone use stood as a record or near-record for many years. The spike in traffic perplexed AT&T employees, who eventually figured out that the program was responsible. Though the phone network survived the spike, it was sufficiently threatening to operations that AT&T established communication with the television networks so that they could be warned of potentially disruptive future events; this system remained in use until at least 2006.

Larry the Lobster was still cited in the 2000s in discussions of classic comedy routines, cruelty to animals, and in rosters of famous animals.

The Larry the Lobster sketch served as an inspiration for the Batman storyline A Death in the Family, which similarly used a phone poll to let audiences determine whether or not Jason Todd would be killed off. Unlike the Saturday Night Live sketch, the Batman poll voted for Todd to die, which the storyline upheld.

== See also ==
- Sniffy the rat
- Cheeseface
