= HMS Auricula =

Two ships of the Royal Navy have been named HMS Auricula :

- HMS Auricula (1917) an Anchusa-class sloop launched in 1917 and sold in 1923
- HMS Auricula (K12), a Flower-class corvette launched in 1940 and lost in 1942 during the Battle of Madagascar.
