= Auricle Ensemble =

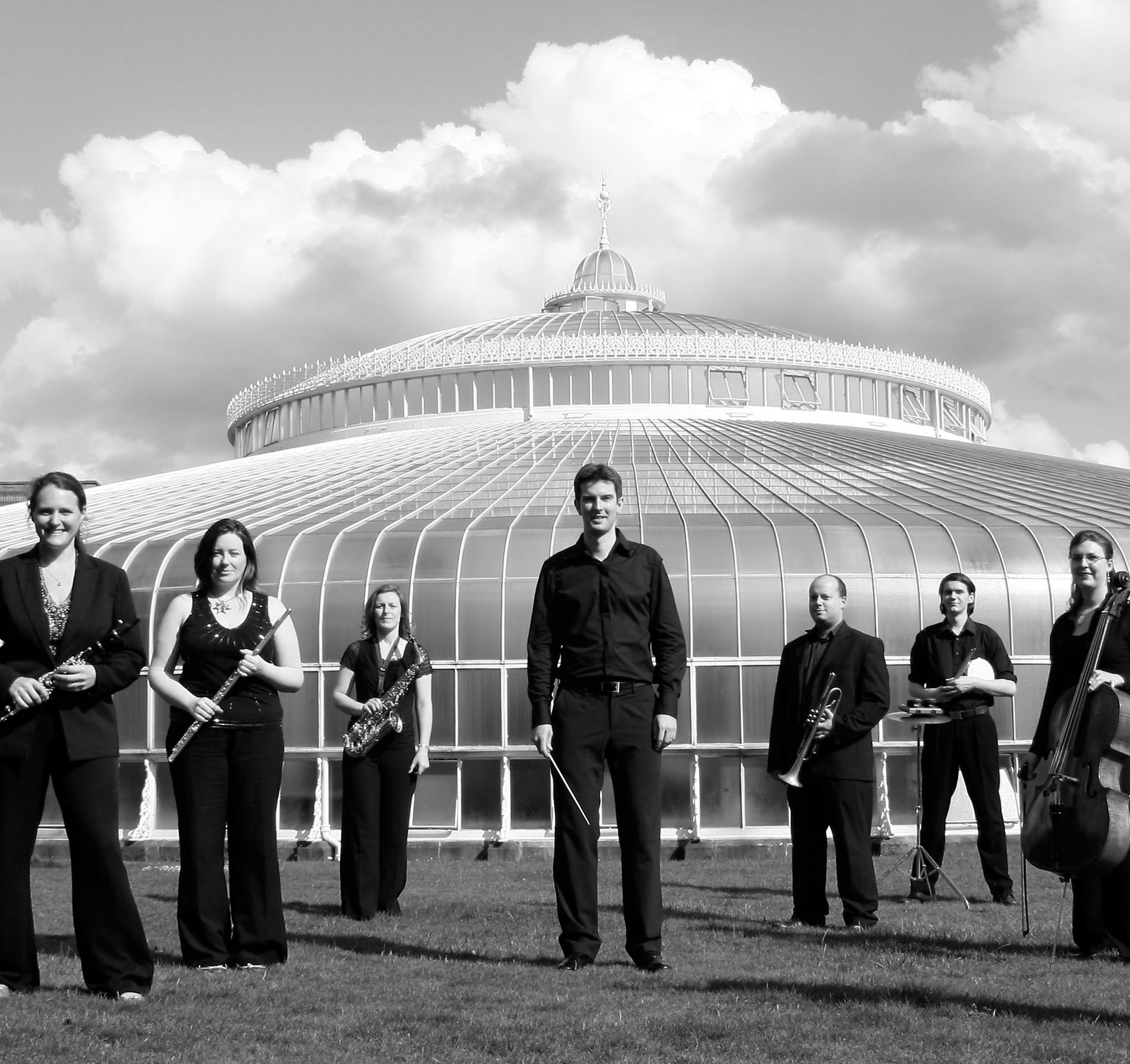

Background information
- Origin: Glasgow, Scotland
- Years active: 2007–present
- Website: www.auricleensemble.org.uk

The Auricle Ensemble is a chamber ensemble based in Scotland. It was created by a co-operative of professional musicians working in the UK in 2007 and has become known for its diverse programming. The group is based in the West End of Glasgow, with rehearsal space and administration based at St Bride's Church, Glasgow. The Auricle Ensemble performs throughout the year as a resident ensemble in the St Bride's at 7 series, and repeats these concerts across Scotland, in places such as the University of Edinburgh, Falkirk Town Hall, Byre Theatre St. Andrews, Isle of Bute, and Wigtown Book Festival.

It performs annually at Glasgow's West End Festival and Edinburgh Festival, and received critical attention with its tour of Arnold Schoenberg's Pierrot Lunaire. The ensemble's family concert with its orchestral octet performances for young audiences narrated by Balamory actress, Juliet Cadzow has been performed in festivals and venues across Scotland.

The Auricle Ensemble's 2010/2011 season features a Mini-Mahler series wherein all of Gustav Mahler's reduced works created for Arnold Schoenberg's Society for Private Musical Performances are being performed over Mahler's two anniversary years.

An "auricle", is the external part of the ear.
