= Timmy Trumpet discography =

- Singles: 98
- EPs: 1
- Remixes: 8

This is the discography of Australian house producer and DJ Timmy Trumpet.

== Albums ==
Title	Details
Mad World	Released: 4 December 2020; Label: SINPHONY; Format: Digital download, streaming
REVELATIONS	Released: 23 October 2026; Label: SINPHONY; Format: Digital download, streaming

== Extended plays ==
Title	Details
Sunrise	Released: 5 December 2009; Label: Central Station; Format: Digital download
Timmy Trumpet's SINPHONY No. 1	Released: 13 October 2023; Label: Sinphony; Format: Digital download
Timmy Trumpet's SINPHONY No. 2	Released: 26 April 2024; Label: Sinphony; Format: Digital download
Timmy Trumpet's SINPHONY No. 3	Released: 20 December 2024; Label: Sinphony; Format: Digital download

== Charted singles ==
Title	Year	Peak chart positions								Certifications	Album
Title	Year	AUS	AUT	BEL (Wa)	CZE Air.	FRA	NED	NZ	SWE	Certifications	Album
"Freaks" (with Savage)	2014	3	—	6	—	11	57	1	6	ARIA: 9× Platinum; RMNZ: 6× Platinum	Non-album singles
"Nightmare"	2014	26	—	—	—	—	—	—	—		Non-album singles
"Hipsta" (with Chardy)	2015	34	—	—	—	—	—	—	—		Non-album singles
"Party Till We Die" (with MAKJ featuring Andrew W.K.)	2016	46	—	—	—	—	—	—	—		Non-album singles
"Punjabi" (with Dimatik)	2017	—	74	—	—	—	—	—	—		Non-album singles
"Deja-Vu" (featuring Savage)	2017	55	—	—	—	—	—	—	—		Non-album singles
"World at Our Feet"	2019	—	61	—	—	—	—	—	—		Non-album singles
"911" (with R3hab)	2020	—	—	—	5	—	—	—	—		Mad World
"Stay Mine" (with Afrojack)	2021	—	—	—	—	—	—	— (Note: "Stay Mine" did not enter the NZ Top 40 Singles Chart, but peaked at number 38 on the NZ Hot Singles Chart.)	—		Non-album singles
"Cardio"	2021	—	—	—	—	—	—	— (Note: "Cardio" did not enter the NZ Top 40 Singles Chart, but peaked at number 37 on the NZ Hot Singles Chart.)	—		Non-album singles
"Call Me" (with Gabry Ponte and R3hab)	2022	—	—	—	—	—	80	— (Note: "Call Me" did not enter the NZ Top 40 Singles Chart, but peaked at number 35 on the NZ Hot Singles Chart.)	—		Non-album singles
"Poison" (with R3hab and W&W)	2022	—	—	—	—	—	—	— (Note: "Poison" did not enter the NZ Top 40 Singles Chart, but peaked at number 40 on the NZ Hot Singles Chart.)	—		Non-album singles
"Sun Comes Up" (with Sam Feldt featuring Joe Taylor and Ekko)	2024	—	—	—	3	—	—	—	—		Non-album singles
"—" denotes a recording that did not chart or was not released in that territory.

== Remixes ==
2010

- Goldfish – "This Is How It Goes" (Timmy Trumpet Remix)
- P Money featuring David Dallas and Aaradhna – "Say Yeah" (Timmy Trumpet Remix)
- Radio Ink – "Wish You Were Here" (Timmy Trumpet Remix)

2011

- Potbelleez – "Midnight Midnight" (Timmy Trumpet Remix)
- P Money featuring PNC, Vince Harder, Meryl Cassie and Mz J – "Dance with You" (Timmy Trumpet Remix)

2012

- Tenzin – "Love Goes On" (Timmy Trumpet Remix)

2014

- Quintino and MOTi featuring Taylr Renee – "Dynamite" (Timmy Trumpet Remix)
- Havana Brown – "Better Not Said" (Timmy Trumpet Remix)

2017

- Throttle – "Baddest Behaviour" (Timmy Trumpet Remix)

2019

- Tujamo – Drop That Low (When I Dip) (Timmy Trumpet Remix)
- Deorro – All This Time (Timmy Trumpet Remix)

2020

- Edward Maya and Vika Jigulina – "Stereo Love" (Timmy Trumpet Remix)
- Joel Corry featuring MNEK – "Head & Heart" (Timmy Trumpet Remix)
- 3 Are Legend, Toneshifterz and Brennan Heart – "Deck the Halls" (Timmy Trumpet Edit)

2021

- Illenium, Dabin, and Lights – "Hearts On Fire" (Timmy Trumpet Remix)
- Dimitri Vegas & Like Mike and Vini Vici – "Get in Trouble (So What)" (Timmy Trumpet Remix)
- Steve Aoki and Willy William featuring Sean Paul, El Alfa, Sfera Ebbasta and Play-N-Skillz – "Mambo" (Timmy Trumpet Remix)
- Felix – "Don't You Want Me" (Timmy Trumpet x Felix)

2024

- t.A.T.u. – "All the Things She Said" (Robin Schulz, Timmy Trumpet, and KOPPY Remix)
