= Auricular branch =

Auricular branch (in Latin, "ramus auricularis") can refer to any one of several different structures having to do with the ear or hearing:

- Nerves
  - The auricular branch of the vagus nerve - "ramus auricularis nervi vagi" (also known as the Alderman's nerve)
  - The auricular branch of the posterior auricular nerve - "ramus auricularis nervus auricularis posterioris"
- Arteries
  - The auricular branch of the occipital artery - "ramus auricularis arteriae occipitalis"
  - The auricular branch of the posterior auricular artery - "ramus auricularis arteriae auricularis posterioris"
  - The anterior auricular branches of the superficial temporal artery - "rami auriculares anteriores arteriae temporalis superficialis"
