= List of Hallmark Channel Original Movies (2010s) =

This is a list of television films produced for the cable network Hallmark Channel in the 2010s. Such films are currently called Hallmark Channel Original Movies.

== 2010 ==
=== Hallmark Channel ===
Movie	Starring	Director	Original airdate	Viewers	Ref	DVD
The Wishing Well	Jordan Ladd and Jason London	David Jackson	January 9, 2010			No
Ice Dreams	Jessica Cauffiel and Shelley Long	David B. Morris	January 23, 2010			No
Elevator Girl	Lacey Chabert and Ryan Merriman	Bradford May	February 13, 2010			No
Uncorked	Julie Benz, JoBeth Williams, and Elliott Gould	David S. Cass Sr.	March 6, 2010			No
Healing Hands	Eddie Cibrian and Lisa Sheridan	Bradford May	March 20, 2010			No
A Soldier's Love Story (a.k.a. Meet My Mom)	Lori Loughlin and Johnny Messner	Harvey Frost	May 8, 2010			Yes
Freshman Father	Drew Seeley, Britt Irvin, and Annie Potts	Michael M. Scott	June 5, 2010			No
Dad's Home	David James Elliott and Sharon Case	Bradford May	June 19, 2010			No
You Lucky Dog	Natasha Henstridge and Harry Hamlin	John Bradshaw	June 26, 2010			Yes
Jack's Family Adventure	Jonathan Silverman and Dedee Pfeiffer	Bradford May	July 17, 2010			No
Lies Between Friends	Gabrielle Anwar and Craig Sheffer	Walter Klenhard	July 31, 2010			No
Class	Jodi Lyn O'Keefe and Justin Bruening	David S. Cass Sr.	August 14, 2010			No
The Wish List	Jennifer Esposito and David Sutcliffe	Kevin Connor	August 28, 2010			No
Fairfield Road	Jesse Metcalfe and Natalie Lisinska	David Weaver	September 11, 2010			Yes
Growing the Big One	Shannen Doherty and Kavan Smith	Mark Griffiths	October 23, 2010			Yes
A Family Thanksgiving	Daphne Zuniga, Dan Payne, and Faye Dunaway	Neill Fearnley	November 6, 2010			Yes
The Good Witch's Gift	Catherine Bell and Chris Potter	Craig Pryce	November 13, 2010			Yes
The Night Before the Night Before Christmas	Jennifer Beals and Rick Roberts	James Orr	November 20, 2010			Yes
The Town Christmas Forgot	Lauren Holly and Rick Roberts	John Bradshaw	November 25, 2010			Yes
Call Me Mrs. Miracle	Doris Roberts, Eric Johnson, and Lauren Holly	Michael M. Scott	November 27, 2010			Yes
The Santa Suit	Kevin Sorbo and Jodie Dowdall	Robert Vaughn	December 2, 2010			Yes
Farewell Mr. Kringle	Christine Taylor and Vivica A. Fox	Kevin Connor	December 4, 2010			No
The Santa Incident	Ione Skye and Greg Germann	Yelena Lanskaya	December 9, 2010			Yes
An Old Fashioned Christmas	Catherine Steadman and Jacqueline Bisset	Don McBrearty	December 11, 2010			Yes
Three Wise Women	Fionnula Flanagan and John Rhys Davies	Declan Recks	December 14, 2010			Yes
Gift of the Magi	Marla Sokoloff and Mark Webber	Lisa Mulcahy	December 16, 2010			Yes
Battle of the Bulbs	Daniel Stern and Matt Frewer	F. Harvey Frost	December 18, 2010			Yes

=== Hallmark Movie Channel ===
Movie	Starring	Director	Original airdate	Viewers	Ref	DVD
The Wild Girl	Brian Austin Green, Graham Greene and Kathleen Munroe	Don McBrearty	April 24, 2010			No
After the Fall	Andrea Bowen, Greg Evigan and Gail O'Grady	Bradford May	October 9, 2010			No

== 2011 ==
=== Hallmark Channel ===
Movie	Starring	Director	Original airdate	Viewers	Ref	DVD
Perfectly Prudence	Jane Seymour, Joe Lando, and Katie Flynn	Paul Schneider	January 8, 2011			No
Backyard Wedding	Alicia Witt, Teddy Sears, and Frances Fisher	Bradford May	January 22, 2011			No
A Valentine's Date	Elisa Donovan, Brad Rowe, and Tom Skerritt	Michael Feifer	February 4, 2011			No
Smooch	Kellie Martin, Kiernan Shipka, and Simon Kassianides	Ron Oliver	February 5, 2011			Yes
Accidentally in Love	Jennie Garth and Ethan Erickson	David Burton Morris	February 12, 2011			Yes
Time after Time	Richard Thomas and Kaj-Erik Eriksen	Gary Harvey	March 19, 2011			No
The Shunning	Danielle Panabaker and Sherry Stringfield	Michael Landon Jr.	April 16, 2011			Yes
Three Weeks, Three Kids	Anna Chlumsky and Warren Christie	Mark Jean	May 7, 2011			No
The Edge of the Garden	Rob Estes and Sarah Manninen	Michael Scott	May 14, 2011			No
Rock the House	Jack Coleman and Cassi Thomson	Ernie Barbarash	June 18, 2011			No
Keeping Up with the Randalls	Roma Downey, Kayla Ewell, and Marion Ross	David S. Cass Sr.	July 16, 2011			No
Honeymoon for One	Nicollette Sheridan and Greg Wise	Kevin Connor	August 13, 2011			No
William & Catherine: A Royal Romance	Jane Alexander, Victor Garber, and Jean Smart	Linda Yellen	August 27, 2011			Yes
Love Begins	Wes Brown and Julie Mond	David S. Cass Sr.	September 17, 2011			Yes
Love's Everlasting Courage	Wes Brown, Julie Mond, and Cheryl Ladd	Bradford May	October 1, 2011			Yes
Oliver's Ghost	Rhea Perlman and Martin Mull	David S. Cass Sr.	October 22, 2011			No
The Good Witch's Family	Catherine Bell, Chris Potter and Sarah Power	Craig Pryce	October 29, 2011			Yes
Love's Christmas Journey	Natalie Hall, Greg Vaughan, and JoBeth Williams	David S. Cass Sr.	November 5, 2011			Yes
Mistletoe Over Manhattan	Tricia Helfer and Greg Bryk	John Bradshaw	November 6, 2011			Yes
Lucky Christmas	Elizabeth Berkley and Jason Gray-Stanford	Gary Yates	November 12, 2011			Yes
Cancel Christmas	Judd Nelson and Justin Landry	John Bradshaw	November 13, 2011			Yes
A Christmas Wedding Tail	Jennie Garth, Brad Rowe, and Tom Arnold	Michael Feifer	November 19, 2011			Yes
The Case for Christmas	Dean Cain and Rachel Blanchard	Timothy Bond	November 19, 2011			Yes
A Christmas Wish	Kristy Swanson, Edward Herrmann, and Tess Harper	Craig Clyde	November 20, 2011			Yes
Jingle All the Way (animated movie)	Thomas Stroppel and Chad Darrow	Chel White	November 25, 2011			Yes
Trading Christmas	Faith Ford, Tom Cavanagh, and Gil Bellows	Michael M. Scott	November 26, 2011			Yes
Holiday Engagement	Bonnie Somerville and Jordan Bridges	Jim Fall	November 27, 2011			Yes
A Princess for Christmas	Katie McGrath, Sam Heughan, and Roger Moore	Michael Damian	December 3, 2011			Yes
Annie Claus Is Coming to Town	Maria Thayer, Vivica A. Fox, and Sam Page	Kevin Connor	December 10, 2011			Yes
The Christmas Pageant	Melissa Gilbert and Robert Mailhouse	David S. Cass Sr.	December 11, 2011			Yes
Christmas Comes Home to Canaan	Billy Ray Cyrus and Gina Holden	Neill Fearnley	December 17, 2011			Yes
Christmas Magic	Lindy Booth and Paul McGillion	John Bradshaw	December 18, 2011			Yes

=== Hallmark Movie Channel ===
Movie	Starring	Director	Original airdate	Viewers	Ref	DVD
Goodnight for Justice	Luke Perry, Lara Gilchrist, and Ron Lea	Jason Priestley	January 29, 2011			Yes
A Crush on You	Brigid Brannagh and Sean Patrick Flannery	Allison Anders	June 11, 2011			No
The Cabin	Lea Thompson and Steven Brand	Brian Trenchard-Smith	July 30, 2011			No
Finding a Family	Kim Delaney and Jared Abrahamson	Mark Jean	October 15, 2011			Yes

== 2012 ==
=== Hallmark Channel ===
Movie	Starring	Director	Original airdate	Viewers	Ref	DVD
Fixing Pete	Brooke Burns, Dylan Bruno, and Valerie Harper	Michael Grossman	January 7, 2012	N/A		No
A Taste of Romance	Teri Polo, James Patrick Stuart and Bailee Madison	Lee Rose	January 14, 2012	1.40		Yes
Undercover Bridesmaid	Brooke Burns and Gregory Harrison	Matthew Diamond	April 15, 2012	1.53		Yes
Notes from the Heart Healer	Genie Francis and Ted McGinley	Douglas Barr	May 12, 2012	1.35		Yes
Kiss at Pine Lake	Barry Watson and Mia Kirshner	Michael M. Scott	May 19, 2012	N/A		No
How to Fall in Love	Eric Mabius, Brooke D'Orsay, and Gina Holden	Mark Griffiths	July 21, 2012	1.37		Yes
The Music Teacher	Annie Potts, Kerry James, and Emilie Ullerup	Ron Oliver	August 11, 2012	0.69		No
Smart Cookies	Jessalyn Gilsig and Bailee Madison	Robert Iscove	August 18, 2012	1.05		Yes
Puppy Love	Candace Cameron Bure and Victor Webster	Harvey Frost	September 8, 2012	1.74		Yes
I Married Who?	Kellie Martin and Ethan Erickson	Kevin Connor	October 20, 2012	N/A		No
Hoops & Yoyo Haunted Halloween	Mike Adair, Greg Arden, and Bev Carlson	Rob Shaw	October 26, 2012	N/A		Yes
The Good Witch's Charm	Catherine Bell, Chris Potter, and Matthew Knight	Craig Pryce	October 27, 2012	2.06		Yes
Christmas Song (CtC)	Natasha Henstridge and Gabriel Hogan	Timothy Bond	November 3, 2012	2.41		Yes
Love at the Thanksgiving Day Parade (CtC)	Autumn Reeser and Antonio Cupo	Ron Oliver	November 4, 2012	2.27		Yes
The Wishing Tree (CtC)	Jason Gedrick, Erica Cerra, and Richard Harmon	Terry Ingram	November 10, 2012	2.55		Yes
Matchmaker Santa (CtC)	Lacey Chabert and Adam Mayfield	David S. Cass Sr.	November 17, 2012	3.28		Yes
It's Christmas, Carol! (CtC)	Emmanuelle Vaugier and Carrie Fisher	Michael M. Scott	November 18, 2012	2.33		Yes
Jingle & Bell's Christmas Star (CtC)	Ami Shalabh, Ryan Bley, and Thomas Stroppel	Chel White	November 23, 2012	N/A		No
Naughty or Nice (CtC)	Hilarie Burton, Matt Dallas, and Danneel Ackles	David Mackay	November 24, 2012	3.07		Yes
Hitched for the Holidays (CtC)	Joey Lawrence and Emily Hampshire	Michael M. Scott	November 25, 2012	2.86		Yes
A Bride for Christmas (CtC)	Arielle Kebbel and Andrew Walker	Gary Yates	December 1, 2012	3.33		Yes
The Christmas Heart (CtC)	Teri Polo and Paul Essiembre	Gary Yates	December 2, 2012	3.28		No
Come Dance with Me (CtC)	Andrew McCarthy and Michelle Nolden	John Bradshaw	December 8, 2012	3.05		Yes
Help for the Holidays (CtC)	Summer Glau, Eva LaRue, and John Brotherton	Bradford May	December 9, 2012	3.64		Yes
Baby's First Christmas (CtC)	Casper Van Dien, Rachel Wilson and Ella Ballentine	Jonathan Wright	December 15, 2012	3.17		Yes

(CtC) Countdown to Christmas is a seasonal programming block.

=== Hallmark Movie Channel ===
Movie	Starring	Director	Original airdate	Viewers	Ref	DVD
Goodnight for Justice: The Measure of a Man	Luke Perry, Cameron Bright, and Stefanie von Pfetten	K.T. Donaldson	January 28, 2012			Yes
Cupid, Inc.	Joely Fisher, Jamie Kennedy, and Roark Critchlow	Ron Oliver	February 11, 2012			No
Chasing Leprechauns	Adrian Pasdar and Amy Huberman	Kevin Connor	March 17, 2012			No
Duke	Steven Weber and Sarah Smyth	Mark Jean	April 28, 2012			Yes
Lake Effects	Scottie Thompson and Jane Seymour	Michael McKay	May 6, 2012			Yes
Hannah's Law	Sara Canning, John Pyper-Ferguson, and Greyston Holt	Rachel Talalay	June 9, 2012			Yes
Operation Cupcake	Dean Cain, Kristy Swanson, and Wade Williams	Bradford May	June 16, 2012			No
Strawberry Summer*	Julie Mond, Trevor Donovan, and Shelley Long	Kevin Connor	August 25, 2012			Yes
The Seven Year Hitch	Natalie Hall, Darin Brooks, and Frances Fisher	Bradford May	October 13, 2012			Yes

- Simultaneous premiere on HC and HMC.

== 2013 ==
=== Hallmark Channel ===
Movie	Starring	Director	Original airdate	Viewers	Ref	DVD
The Nearlyweds	Danielle Panabaker, Jessica P. Kennedy, and Britt Irvin	Mark Griffiths	January 12, 2013	1.32		Yes
The Sweeter Side of Life	Kathryn Morris and James Best	Michael Damian	January 19, 2013	1.98		Yes
Be My Valentine	William Baldwin and Natalie Brown	Graeme Campbell	February 9, 2013	2.04		Yes
Return to Nim's Island (WFT)	Bindi Irwin, Toby Wallace, and John Waters	Brendan Maher	March 15, 2013	0.48		Yes
All's Fair In Love and Advertising	Steven Weber, Andrew Francis, and Michelle Harrison	K.T. Donaldson	March 16, 2013	0.86		Yes
Mr. Hockey: The Gordie Howe Story	Michael Shanks and Kathleen Robertson	Andy Mikita	May 4, 2013; April 28 in Canada	0.71		Yes
The Confession	Sherry Stringfield and Katie Leclerc	Michael Landon Jr.	May 11, 2013	1.53		Yes
Notes From Dad	Eddie Cibrian and Josie Davis	Eriq La Salle	June 15, 2013	1.30		No
Banner 4th of July	Brooke White and Mercedes Ruehl	Don McBrearty	June 29, 2013	1.36		Yes
Second Chances	Alison Sweeney and Greg Vaughan	Ernie Barbarash	July 27, 2013	2.81		No
Reading, Writing, and Romance	Eric Mabius, Virginia Williams, and Stefanie Powers	Ernie Barbarash	August 10, 2013	1.52		No
This Magic Moment	Diane Neal and Travis Schuldt	David S. Cass Sr.	August 17, 2013	1.47		No
Dear Dumb Diary (WFT)	Emily Alyn Lind and Mary-Charles Jones	Kristin Hanggi	September 13, 2013	N/A		Yes
Garage Sale Mystery	Lori Loughlin, Rick Ravanello, and Sarah Strange	Peter DeLuise	September 14, 2013	2.28		Yes
The Watsons Go to Birmingham (WFT)	Bryce Clyde Jenkins and Harrison Knight	Kenny Leon	September 20, 2013	N/A		Yes
Signed, Sealed, Delivered	Eric Mabius, Kristin Booth, and Crystal Lowe	Scott Smith	October 12, 2013	1.72		Yes
When Calls the Heart	Maggie Grace, Stephen Amell, and Lori Loughlin	Michael Landon Jr.	October 19, 2013	N/A		Yes
The Hunters (WFT)	Victor Garber, Robbie Amell, and Alexa Vega	Nisha Ganatra	October 25, 2013	N/A		Yes
The Good Witch's Destiny	Catherine Bell, Chris Potter, and Robin Dunne	Craig Pryce	October 26, 2013	2.82		Yes
The Thanksgiving House (CtC)	Emily Rose and Justin Bruening	Kevin Connor	November 2, 2013	3.22		Yes
Pete's Christmas (WFT) (CtC)	Zachary Gordon and Molly Parker	Nisha Ganatra	November 8, 2013	1.47		Yes
Snow Bride (CtC)	Katrina Law, Jordan Belfi, and Patricia Richardson	Bert Kish	November 9, 2013	3.40		Yes
A Very Merry Mix-Up (CtC)	Alicia Witt and Mark Wiebe	Jonathan Wright	November 10, 2013	4.35		Yes
The Christmas Ornament (CtC)	Kellie Martin and Cameron Mathison	Mark Jean	November 16, 2013	4.31		Yes
Catch a Christmas Star (CtC)	Shannon Elizabeth and Steve Byers	John Bradshaw	November 17, 2013	3.86		Yes
Window Wonderland (CtC)	Chyler Leigh, Paul Campbell, and Cameron Mathison	Michael M. Scott	November 23, 2013	3.72		Yes
Fir Crazy (CtC)	Sarah Lancaster and Eric Johnson	Craig Pryce	November 24, 2013	3.81		Yes
Let It Snow (CtC)	Candace Cameron Bure, Jesse Hutch, and Alan Thicke	Harvey Frost	November 30, 2013	4.24		Yes
The Christmas Spirit (CtC)	Nicollette Sheridan, Bart Johnson, and Sammi Hanratty	Jack Angelo	December 1, 2013	3.37		No
Santa Switch (CtC)	Ethan Erickson and Sean Astin	David S. Cass Jr.	December 7, 2013	3.05		Yes
Hats Off to Christmas! (CtC)	Haylie Duff and Antonio Cupo	Terry Ingram	December 14, 2013	3.46		Yes
Finding Christmas (CtC)	Tricia Helfer, JT Hodges, and Mark Lutz	Harvey Crossland	December 15, 2013	2.43		No

(CtC) Countdown to Christmas is a seasonal programming block.

=== Hallmark Movie Channel ===
Movie	Starring	Director	Original airdate	Viewers	Ref	DVD
Goodnight for Justice: Queen of Hearts	Luke Perry, Ricky Schroder, and Katharine Isabelle	Martin Wood	January 26, 2013	1.00		Yes
Meddling Mom	Sonia Braga, Mercedes Renard, and Ana Ayora	Patricia Cardoso	February 23, 2013			Yes
Our Wild Hearts	Ricky Schroder and Cambrie Schroder	Ricky Schroder	March 9, 2013	1.00		Yes
Shadow on the Mesa	Wes Brown, Kevin Sorbo, and Gail O'Grady	David S. Cass Sr.	March 23, 2013	1.10		Yes
After All These Years	Wendie Malick, Andrea Martin, and Martha Burns	Scott Smith	April 20, 2013			Yes
A Way Back Home (a.k.a. Shuffleton's Barbershop)	Austin Stowell, Kayla Ewell, and Danny Glover	Mark Jean	June 1, 2013			Yes
The Mystery Cruise	Gail O'Grady and Michelle Harrison	Douglas Barr	October 5, 2013			Yes
Christmas with Tucker	James Brolin, Gage Munroe, and Barbara Gordon	Larry McLean	November 25, 2013			Yes

== 2014 ==
=== Hallmark Channel ===
Movie	Starring	Director	Original airdate	Viewers	Ref	DVD
June in January	Brooke D'Orsay and Wes Brown	Mark Griffiths	January 18, 2014	1.59		Yes
Chance at Romance	Erin Krakow and Ryan McPartlin	Bradford May	February 8, 2014	1.50		Yes
A Ring by Spring	Rachel Boston and Kirby Morrow	K.T. Donaldson	March 8, 2014	1.71		Yes
Lucky in Love	Jessica Szohr and Benjamin Hollingsworth	Kevin Fair	April 5, 2014	1.23		Yes
A Lesson in Romance	Kristy Swanson and Scott Grimes	Ron Oliver	April 19, 2014	1.43		No
Mom's Day Away	Bonnie Somerville and James Tupper	Mark Jean	May 10, 2014	1.41		Yes
Looking for Mr. Right	Sarah Lancaster, Kip Pardue, and Brandon Quinn	Kevin Connor	June 7, 2014	1.09		No
When Sparks Fly	Meghan Markle, Christopher Jacot, and Lochlyn Munro	Gary Yates	June 28, 2014	1.44		Yes
Angels Sing	Harry Connick Jr. and Connie Britton	Tim McCanlies	July 12, 2014	N/A		Yes
For Better or For Worse	Lisa Whelchel and Antonio Cupo	Marita Grabiak	July 19, 2014	1.98		Yes
Stranded in Paradise	Vanessa Marcil, James Denton, and Cindy Pickett	Bert Kish	August 9, 2014	2.20		Yes
Perfect on Paper	Drew Fuller, Lindsay Hartley, and Morgan Fairchild	Ron Oliver	September 20, 2014	N/A		No
Midnight Masquerade	Autumn Reeser, Christopher Russell, and Richard Burgi	Graeme Campbell	September 27, 2014	N/A		Yes
Recipe for Love	Danielle Panabaker, Shawn Roberts, and Pascale Hutton	Ron Oliver	October 11, 2014	N/A		No
My Boyfriends' Dogs	Erika Christensen and Teryl Rothery	Terry Ingram	October 18, 2014	1.50		Yes
The Good Witch's Wonder	Catherine Bell, Chris Potter, and Catherine Disher	Craig Pryce	October 25, 2014	2.49		Yes
One Starry Christmas (CtC)	Sarah Carter and Damon Runyan	John Bradshaw	November 1, 2014	3.09		Yes
The Nine Lives of Christmas (CtC)	Kimberley Sustad, Brandon Routh, and Chelsea Hobbs	Mark Jean	November 8, 2014	3.36		Yes
A Cookie Cutter Christmas (CtC)	Erin Krakow, David Haydn-Jones, and Alan Thicke	Christie Will Wolf	November 9, 2014	3.22		Yes
Northpole (CtC)	Tiffani Thiessen, Josh Hopkins, and Bailee Madison	Douglas Barr	November 15, 2014	4.01		Yes
Angels and Ornaments (CtC)	Jessalyn Gilsig, Sergio Di Zio, and Graham Abbey	Alan Goluboff	November 16, 2014	3.32		Yes
A Royal Christmas (CtC)	Lacey Chabert, Stephen Hagan, and Jane Seymour	Alex Zamm	November 21, 2014	4.48		Yes
The Christmas Shepherd (CtC)	Teri Polo and Martin Cummins	Terry Ingram	November 23, 2014	4.15		Yes
Christmas Under Wraps (CtC)	Candace Cameron Bure and David O'Donnell	Peter Sullivan	November 29, 2014	5.75		Yes
One Christmas Eve (HHoF) (CtC)	Anne Heche, Kevin Daniels, and Carlos Gómez	Jay Russell	November 30, 2014	3.59		Yes
Debbie Macomber's Mr. Miracle (CtC)	Kendra Anderson and Candus Churchill	Carl Bessai	December 6, 2014	3.36		Yes
Christmas at Cartwright's (CtC)	Alicia Witt, Gabriel Hogan, and Wallace Shawn	Graeme Campbell	December 7, 2014	4.14		Yes
Best Christmas Party Ever (CtC)	Torrey DeVitto and Steve Lund	John Bradshaw	December 13, 2014	3.42		Yes
The Christmas Parade (CtC)	AnnaLynne McCord and Jefferson Brown	Jonathan Wright	December 14, 2014	3.50		Yes

(CtC) Countdown to Christmas is a seasonal programming block.

=== Hallmark Movies & Mysteries ===
Movie	Starring	Director	Original airdate	Viewers	Ref	DVD
My Gal Sunday	Rachel Blanchard, Cameron Mathison and Steve Bacic	K.T. Donaldson	January 25, 2014	N/A		Yes
The Redemption of Henry Myers	Drew Waters and Erin Bethea	Clayton Miller	March 23, 2014	N/A		Yes
The Color of Rain	Lacey Chabert and Warren Christie	Anne Wheeler	May 31, 2014	N/A		Yes
The Memory Book	Meghan Ory and Luke Macfarlane	Paul A. Kaufman	July 26, 2014	N/A		Yes
Along Came a Nanny	Cameron Mathison and Sarah Lancaster	Michael M. Scott	October 12, 2014	N/A		No
Wedding Planner Mystery	Erica Durance and Andrew Walker	Ron Oliver	October 19, 2014	N/A		Yes
Garage Sale Mystery: All That Glitters	Lori Loughlin, Sarah Strange and Steve Bacic	Peter DeLuise	October 26, 2014	N/A		Yes
Signed, Sealed, Delivered for Christmas	Eric Mabius, Kristin Booth and Crystal Lowe	Kevin Fair	November 23, 2014	0.76		Yes
The Christmas Secret	Bethany Joy Lenz and John Reardon	Norma Bailey	December 7, 2014	0.93		Yes

== 2015 ==
=== Hallmark Channel ===
Movie	Starring	Director	Original airdate	Viewers	Ref	DVD
Surprised by Love	Hilarie Burton and Paul Campbell	Robert Iscove	January 3, 2015	2.37		Yes
A Novel Romance	Amy Acker and Dylan Bruce	Mark Griffiths	January 10, 2015	2.21		Yes
Bridal Wave	Arielle Kebbel and Andrew Walker	Michael M. Scott	January 17, 2015	2.17		Yes
Love by the Book	Leah Renee and Kristopher Turner	David S. Cass Sr.	January 24, 2015	2.00		Yes
Away and Back (HHoF)	Jason Lee and Minka Kelly	Jeff Bleckner	January 25, 2015	N/A		Yes
A Wish Come True (CtVD)	Megan Park and Benjamin Hollingsworth	Mark Rosman	January 31, 2015	1.94		Yes
I Do, I Do, I Do (CtVD)	Autumn Reeser and Shawn Roberts	Ron Oliver	February 6, 2015	N/A		No
So You Said Yes (CtVD)	Kellie Martin and Chad Willett	Christie Will Wolf	February 7, 2015	2.34		Yes
Cloudy with a Chance of Love (CtVD)	Katie Leclerc and Michael Rady	Bradford May	February 8, 2015	N/A		Yes
All of My Heart (CtVD)	Lacey Chabert and Brennan Elliott	Peter DeLuise	February 14, 2015	3.03		Yes
Portrait of Love	Jason Dohring and Bree Williamson	K.T. Donaldson	March 14, 2015	1.74		No
Romantically Speaking	Heather Morris and Jonathan Bennett	Ron Oliver	April 9, 2015	N/A		No
Just the Way You Are	Candace Cameron Bure and Ty Olsson	K.T. Donaldson	May 9, 2015	1.67		Yes
Perfect Match (JW)	Danica McKellar and Paul Greene	Ron Oliver	June 20, 2015	1.37		Yes
Love, Again (JW)	Teri Polo and Paul Johansson	Michael M. Scott	June 21, 2015	1.63		Yes
A Country Wedding (JW)	Jesse Metcalfe and Autumn Reeser	Anne Wheeler	June 27, 2015	2.22		Yes
Family for Christmas	Lacey Chabert and Tyron Leitso	Amanda Tapping	July 11, 2015	1.71		Yes
Lead With Your Heart	William Baldwin and Kari Matchett	Bradley Walsh	September 19, 2015	1.47		Yes
Love on the Air	Alison Sweeney and Jonathan Scarfe	K.T. Donaldson	September 26, 2015	1.86		No
Autumn Dreams (FH)	Jill Wagner and Colin Egglesfield	Neill Fearnley	October 3, 2015	2.09		Yes
Harvest Moon (FH)	Jessy Schram and Jesse Hutch	Peter DeLuise	October 10, 2015	2.90		Yes
October Kiss (FH)	Ashley Williams and Sam Jaeger	Lynne Stopkewich	October 17, 2015	2.59		Yes
Jesse Stone: Lost in Paradise	Tom Selleck and Kohl Sudduth	Robert Harmon	October 18, 2015	2.71		Yes
Good Witch: Something Wicked (FH)	Catherine Bell and James Denton	Craig Pryce	October 24, 2015	2.68		Yes
'Tis the Season for Love (CtC)	Sarah Lancaster and Brendan Penny	Terry Ingram	November 1, 2015	2.35		Yes
Ice Sculpture Christmas (CtC)	Rachel Boston and David Alpay	David Mackay	November 7, 2015	3.28		Yes
Charming Christmas (CtC)	Julie Benz and David Sutcliffe	Craig Pryce	November 8, 2015	3.30		Yes
I'm Not Ready for Christmas (CtC)	Alicia Witt and George Stults	Sam Irvin	November 14, 2015	3.60		Yes
Christmas Incorporated (CtC)	Shenae Grimes-Beech and Steve Lund	Jonathan Wright	November 15, 2015	3.16		Yes
Northpole: Open for Christmas (CtC)	Lori Loughlin and Bailee Madison	Douglas Barr	November 21, 2015	3.49		Yes
Merry Matrimony (CtC)	Jessica Lowndes and Christopher Russell	John Bradshaw	November 22, 2015	3.34		Yes
Once Upon a Holiday (CtC)	Briana Evigan and Paul Campbell	James Head	November 25, 2015	3.08		Yes
12 Gifts of Christmas (CtC)	Katrina Law and Aaron O'Connell	Peter Sullivan	November 26, 2015	3.14		Yes
Crown for Christmas (CtC)	Danica McKellar and Rupert Penry-Jones	Alex Zamm	November 27, 2015	4.29		Yes
A Christmas Detour (CtC)	Candace Cameron Bure and Paul Greene	Ron Oliver	November 28, 2015	4.78		Yes
Angel of Christmas (CtC)	Jennifer Finnigan and Jonathan Scarfe	Ron Oliver	November 29, 2015	3.32		Yes
Just in Time for Christmas (HHoF) (CtC)	Eloise Mumford and Michael Stahl-David	Sean McNamara	December 5, 2015	3.46		Yes
Karen Kingsbury's The Bridge: Part 1 (CtC)	Katie Findlay and Wyatt Nash	Mike Rohl	December 6, 2015	3.20		Yes
On the Twelfth Day of Christmas (CtC)	Brooke Nevin and Robin Dunne	Harvey Crossland	December 12, 2015	3.51		No
A Christmas Melody (CtC)	Lacey Chabert, Brennan Elliott, and Mariah Carey	Mariah Carey	December 19, 2015	3.95		Yes
Christmas Land (CtC)	Nikki Deloach and Luke Macfarlane	Sam Irvin	December 20, 2015	4.24		Yes
When Calls the Heart: New Year's Wish (CtC)	Erin Krakow, Daniel Lissing, and Lori Loughlin	Neill Fearnley	December 26, 2015	2.49		Yes

(CtVD) Countdown to Valentine's Day, (JW) June Weddings, (FH) Fall Harvest, and (CtC) Countdown to Christmas are seasonal programming blocks.

=== Hallmark Movies & Mysteries ===
Movie	Starring	Director	Original airdate	Viewers	Ref	DVD
A Gift of Miracles	Rachel Boston and Jesse Moss	Neill Fearnley	February 15, 2015	N/A		No
A Bone to Pick: An Aurora Teagarden Mystery	Candace Cameron Bure and Lexa Doig	Martin Wood	April 7, 2015	N/A		Yes
Garage Sale Mystery: The Deadly Room	Lori Loughlin and Steve Bacic	Peter DeLuise	April 11, 2015	1.00		Yes
Murder, She Baked: A Chocolate Chip Cookie Mystery	Alison Sweeney and Cameron Mathison	Mark Jean	May 2, 2015	1.10		Yes
Gourmet Detective	Dylan Neal and Brooke Burns	Scott Smith	May 16, 2015	1.62		Yes
Signed, Sealed, Delivered: From Paris With Love	Eric Mabius, Kristin Booth, and Crystal Lowe	Kevin Fair	June 6, 2015	0.83		Yes
Real Murders: An Aurora Teagarden Mystery	Candace Cameron Bure and Robin Dunne	Martin Wood	July 26, 2015	N/A		Yes
Gourmet Detective: A Healthy Place To Die	Dylan Neal and Brooke Burns	Scott Smith	August 2, 2015	N/A		Yes
Garage Sale Mystery: The Wedding Dress	Lori Loughlin and Steve Bacic	Peter DeLuise	August 9, 2015	N/A		Yes
Love Under The Stars	Ashley Newbrough and Wes Brown	Terry Ingram	August 16, 2015	N/A		No
Signed, Sealed, Delivered: Truth Be Told	Eric Mabius, Kristin Booth, and Crystal Lowe	Kevin Fair	September 13, 2015	0.81		Yes
Hello, It's Me	Kellie Martin and Kavan Smith	Mark Jean	September 27, 2015	N/A		No
Signed, Sealed, Delivered: The Impossible Dream	Eric Mabius, Kristin Booth, and Crystal Lowe	Kevin Fair	October 4, 2015	0.80		Yes
Beverly Lewis' The Reckoning	Katie Leclerc and Jacob Blair	Mark Jean	October 11, 2015	0.76		Yes
Murder, She Baked: A Plum Pudding Mystery	Alison Sweeney and Cameron Mathison	K.T. Donaldson	November 23, 2015	N/A		Yes
I Hope You Dance: The Power and Spirit of Song	Maya Angelou, Vince Gill, and Graham Nash	John Scheinfeld	November 26, 2015	0.13		Yes
The Christmas Note (TMWMoC)	Jamie-Lynn Sigler and Greg Vaughan	Terry Ingram	November 29, 2015	1.02		Yes
Magic Stocking (TMWMoC)	Bridget Regan and Victor Webster	David Winning	December 6, 2015	0.92		Yes
Debbie Macomber's Dashing Through the Snow (TMWMoC)	Meghan Ory and Andrew Walker	K.T. Donaldson	December 13, 2015	1.01		Yes

(TMWMoC) The Most Wonderful Movies of Christmas is a seasonal programming block.

== 2016 ==
=== Hallmark Channel ===
Movie	Starring	Director	Original airdate	Viewers	Ref	DVD
Love in Paradise (W)	Emmanuelle Vaugier and Luke Perry	Sean McNamara	January 2, 2016	3.07		No
Love's Complicated (W)	Holly Marie Combs and Ben Bass	Jerry Ciccoritti	January 9, 2016	2.23		No
Love on the Sidelines (W)	Emily Kinney and John Reardon	Terry Ingram	January 16, 2016	2.40		Yes
Unleashing Mr. Darcy (W)	Cindy Busby and Ryan Paevey	David Winning	January 23, 2016	3.04		Yes
Dater's Handbook (CtVD)	Meghan Markle and Kristoffer Polaha	James Head	January 30, 2016	1.99		Yes
All Things Valentine (CtVD)	Sarah Rafferty and Samuel Page	Gary Harvey	January 31, 2016	1.70		Yes
Appetite for Love (CtVD)	Taylor Cole and Andrew Walker	David Mackay	February 6, 2016	2.40		Yes
Valentine Ever After (CtVD)	Autumn Reeser and Eric Johnson	Don McBrearty	February 13, 2016	2.53		Yes
Anything for Love (CtVD)	Erika Christensen and Paul Greene	Terry Ingram	February 14, 2016	2.18		Yes
All Yours (SF)	Nicollette Sheridan and Dan Payne	Monika Mitchell	April 2, 2016	2.21		No
Hearts of Spring (SF)	Lisa Whelchel and Michael Shanks	Marita Grabiak	April 9, 2016	2.22		No
Love by Chance (SF)	Beau Garrett and Benjamin Ayres	Gary Harvey	April 16, 2016	2.17		Yes
Tulips in Spring	Fiona Gubelmann and Lucas Bryant	David Winning	May 14, 2016	2.07		Yes
Date with Love	Shenae Grimes-Beech and Andrew Walker	Ron Oliver	May 21, 2016	1.89		Yes
Wedding Bells (JW)	Danica McKellar and Kavan Smith	Gary Yates	June 3, 2016	1.10		Yes
Ms. Matched (JW)	Alexa PenaVega and Shawn Roberts	Mark Jean	June 4, 2016	1.83		Yes
Stop the Wedding! (JW)	Rachel Boston and Niall Matter	Anne Wheeler	June 11, 2016	2.25		Yes
The Convenient Groom (JW)	Vanessa Marcil and David Sutcliffe	David Winning	June 18, 2016	2.23		Yes
The Wedding March (JW)	Jack Wagner and Josie Bissett	Neill Fearnley	June 25, 2016	2.30		Yes
A Perfect Christmas	Susie Abromeit and Dillon Casey	Brian K. Roberts	July 16, 2016	2.28		No
Summer Villa (SN)	Hilarie Burton and Victor Webster	Pat Kiely	July 23, 2016	2.09		Yes
For Love & Honor (SN)	James Denton and Natalie Brown	Laurie Lynd	July 30, 2016	2.11		Yes
My Summer Prince (SN)	Taylor Cole and Jack Turner	Peter Sullivan	August 6, 2016	1.95		Yes
Summer In the City (SN)	Julianna Guill and Marc Bendavid	Vic Sarin	August 13, 2016	1.63		No
Summer Love (SN)	Rachael Leigh Cook and Lucas Bryant	Lynne Stopkewich	August 20, 2016	1.77		Yes
Summer of Dreams (SN)	Debbie Gibson and Robert Gant	Mike Rohl	August 27, 2016	2.54		Yes
Love on a Limb (FH)	Ashley Williams and Trevor Donovan	Mel Damski	October 1, 2016	2.33		Yes
Autumn in the Vineyard (FH)	Rachael Leigh Cook and Brendan Penny	Scott Smith	October 8, 2016	2.19		Yes
Pumpkin Pie Wars (FH)	Julie Gonzalo and Eric Aragon	Steven R. Monroe	October 15, 2016	2.17		Yes
Good Witch: Secrets of Grey House (FH)	Catherine Bell and James Denton	Craig Pryce	October 22, 2016	2.24		Yes
A Wish for Christmas (CtC)	Lacey Chabert and Paul Greene	Christie Will Wolf	October 29, 2016	3.37		Yes
The Mistletoe Promise (CtC)	Jaime King and Luke Macfarlane	David Winning	November 5, 2016	3.90		Yes
Every Christmas Has a Story (CtC)	Lori Loughlin and Colin Ferguson	Ron Oliver	November 12, 2016	4.01		Yes
Christmas Cookies (CtC)	Jill Wagner and Wes Brown	James Head	November 13, 2016	3.71		Yes
My Christmas Dream (CtC)	Danica McKellar and David Haydn-Jones	James Head	November 19, 2016	4.45		Yes
A December Bride (CtC)	Jessica Lowndes and Daniel Lissing	David Winning	November 20, 2016	4.29		Yes
Broadcasting Christmas (CtC)	Melissa Joan Hart and Dean Cain	Peter Sullivan	November 23, 2016	3.24		Yes
Christmas in Homestead (CtC)	Taylor Cole and Michael Rady	Steven R. Monroe	November 24, 2016	3.37		Yes
Christmas List (CtC)	Alicia Witt and Gabriel Hogan	Paul A. Kaufman	November 25, 2016	4.09		Yes
A Heavenly Christmas (HHoF) (CtC)	Kristin Davis and Eric McCormack	Paul Shapiro	November 26, 2016	4.25		Yes
Journey Back to Christmas (CtC)	Candace Cameron Bure and Oliver Hudson	Mel Damski	November 27, 2016	4.84		Yes
A Dream of Christmas (CtC)	Nikki DeLoach and Andrew Walker	Gary Yates	December 3, 2016	3.79		Yes
Looks Like Christmas (CtC)	Anne Heche and Dylan Neal	Terry Ingram	December 4, 2016	3.88		Yes
A Nutcracker Christmas (CtC)	Amy Acker and Sascha Radetsky	Michael Lembeck	December 10, 2016	3.70		Yes
Love You Like Christmas (CtC)	Bonnie Somerville and Brennan Elliott	Graeme Campbell	December 11, 2016	4.33		Yes
My Christmas Love (CtC)	Meredith Hagner and Bobby Campo	Jeff Fisher	December 17, 2016	4.59		Yes
Sleigh Bells Ring (CtC)	Erin Cahill and David Alpay	Marita Grabiak	December 18, 2016	4.17		Yes
When Calls the Heart Christmas (CtC)	Erin Krakow and Daniel Lissing	Neill Fearnley	December 25, 2016	3.66		Yes

(W) Winterfest, (CtVD) Countdown to Valentine's Day, (SF) Spring Fling, (JW) June Weddings, (SN) Summer Nights, (FH) Fall Harvest, and (CtC) Countdown to Christmas are seasonal programming blocks.

=== Hallmark Movies & Mysteries ===
Movie	Starring	Director	Original airdate	Viewers	Ref	DVD
Garage Sale Mystery: Guilty Until Proven Innocent	Lori Loughlin and Steve Bacic	Peter DeLuise	January 3, 2016	0.94		Yes
Murder, She Baked: A Peach Cobbler Mystery	Alison Sweeney and Cameron Mathison	K.T. Donaldson	January 10, 2016	0.86		Yes
Flower Shop Mystery: Mum's the Word	Brooke Shields and Brennan Elliott	Bradley Walsh	January 17, 2016	0.88		Yes
The Ultimate Legacy	Doug Jones and Raquel Welch	Joanne Hock	January 31, 2016	0.69		Yes
Signed, Sealed, Delivered: From The Heart	Eric Mabius and Kristin Booth	Lynne Stopkewich	February 21, 2016	0.81		Yes
Karen Kingsbury's The Bridge: Part 2	Katie Findlay and Wyatt Nash	Mike Rohl	March 20, 2016	1.44		Yes
Sandra Brown's White Hot	Shenae Grimes-Beech and Sean Faris	Mark Jean	April 17, 2016	0.75		No
Flower Shop Mystery: Snipped in the Bud	Brooke Shields and Brennan Elliott	Bradley Walsh	April 24, 2016	0.62		Yes
Karen Kingsbury's A Time to Dance	Jennie Garth and Dan Payne	Mike Rohl	May 15, 2016	0.78		Yes
Garage Sale Mystery: The Novel Murders	Lori Loughlin and Steve Bacic	Norma Bailey	June 5, 2016	1.15		Yes
Three Bedrooms, One Corpse: An Aurora Teagarden Mystery	Candace Cameron Bure and Yannick Bisson	Lynne Stopkewich	June 12, 2016	1.00		Yes
Murder, She Baked: A Deadly Recipe	Alison Sweeney and Cameron Mathison	K.T. Donaldson	June 19, 2016	1.01		Yes
Flower Shop Mystery: Dearly Depotted	Brooke Shields and Brennan Elliott	Bradley Walsh	June 26, 2016	1.15		Yes
Signed, Sealed, Delivered: One in a Million	Eric Mabius and Kristin Booth	Kevin Fair	July 24, 2016	1.02		Yes
JL Family Ranch	Jon Voight and James Caan	Charles R. Carner	August 21, 2016	1.01		Yes
Signed, Sealed, Delivered: Lost Without You	Eric Mabius and Kristin Booth	Kevin Fair	September 25, 2016	1.00		Yes
The Irresistible Blueberry Farm	Alison Sweeney and Marc Blucas	K.T. Donaldson	October 2, 2016	1.39		Yes
Death Al Dente: A Gourmet Detective Mystery	Dylan Neal and Brooke Burns	Terry Ingram	October 9, 2016	0.83		Yes
The Julius House: An Aurora Teagarden Mystery	Candace Cameron Bure and Yannick Bisson	Terry Ingram	October 16, 2016	1.18		Yes
Hailey Dean Mystery: Murder, With Love	Kellie Martin and Matthew MacCaull	Terry Ingram	October 23, 2016	1.20		Yes
Love Always, Santa	Marguerite Moreau and Mike Faiola	Brian Herzlinger	November 6, 2016	0.96		No
Finding Father Christmas	Erin Krakow and Niall Matter	Terry Ingram	November 13, 2016	1.56		Yes
Operation Christmas	Tricia Helfer and Marc Blucas	David Weaver	November 20, 2016	1.45		Yes
I'll Be Home for Christmas	James Brolin, Mena Suvari, and John Reardon	James Brolin	November 27, 2016	1.49		Yes
Hearts of Christmas	Emilie Ullerup and Kristoffer Polaha	Monika Mitchell	December 4, 2016	1.62		Yes
Sound of Christmas	Lindy Booth and Robin Dunne	Harvey Crossland	December 11, 2016	1.48		Yes
A Christmas to Remember	Mira Sorvino and Cameron Mathison	David Weaver	December 18, 2016	1.42		Yes

== 2017 ==
=== Hallmark Channel ===
Movie	Starring	Director	Original airdate	Viewers	Ref	DVD
A Rose for Christmas	Rachel Boston and Marc Bendavid	Kevin Fair	January 1, 2017	3.50		Yes
Love on Ice (W)	Julie Berman and Andrew Walker	Bradley Walsh	January 7, 2017	2.77		Yes
A Royal Winter (W)	Merritt Patterson and Jack Donnelly	Ernie Babarash	January 14, 2017	2.69		Yes
The Birthday Wish (W)	Jessy Schram and Luke Macfarlane	Peter DeLuise	January 21, 2017	2.44		Yes
Love Locks (HHoF)	Rebecca Romijn and Jerry O'Connell	Martin Wood	January 28, 2017	2.24		Yes
Walking the Dog (CtVD)	Jennifer Finnigan and Samuel Page	Gary Harvey	February 4, 2017	2.45		Yes
A Dash of Love (CtVD)	Jen Lilley and Brendan Penny	Christie Will Wolf	February 11, 2017	2.52		Yes
While You Were Dating (CtVD)	William Baldwin and Stefanie von Pfetten	David Winning	February 12, 2017	1.57		Yes
Love at First Glance (CtVD)	Amy Smart and Adrian Grenier	Kevin Connor	February 14, 2017	1.34		Yes
Love Blossoms	Shantel VanSanten and Victor Webster	Jonathan Wright	February 18, 2017	2.19		Yes
Campfire Kiss	Danica McKellar and Paul Greene	James Head	March 18, 2017	2.30		Yes
Love at First Bark (SF)	Jana Kramer and Kevin McGarry	Mike Rohl	April 1, 2017	2.16		Yes
Moonlight in Vermont (SF)	Lacey Chabert and Carlo Marks	Mel Damski	April 8, 2017	2.51		Yes
Like Cats and Dogs (SF)	Cassidy Gifford and Wyatt Nash	Ron Oliver	April 15, 2017	1.99		Yes
The Perfect Catch (SF)	Nikki DeLoach and Andrew Walker	Steven R. Monroe	April 22, 2017	2.38		Yes
The Art of Us	Taylor Cole and Steve Lund	K.T. Donaldson	May 20, 2017	1.87		Yes
All for Love	Sara Rue and Steve Bacic	Lee Friedlander	May 27, 2017	2.01		Yes
Destination Wedding (JW)	Alexa PenaVega and Jeremy Guilbaut	James Head	June 3, 2017	2.21		Yes
The Perfect Bride (JW)	Pascale Hutton and Kavan Smith	Martin Wood	June 10, 2017	2.03		Yes
Wedding March 2: Resorting to Love (JW)	Jack Wagner and Josie Bissett	David Weaver	June 17, 2017	2.32		Yes
My Favorite Wedding (JW)	Maggie Lawson and Paul Greene	Mel Damski	June 24, 2017	2.11		Yes
The Christmas Cure	Brooke Nevin and Steve Byers	John Bradshaw	July 15, 2017	2.15		Yes
Love at the Shore (SN)	Amanda Righetti and Peter Porte	Steven R. Monroe	August 5, 2017	2.22		Yes
Summer in the Vineyard (SN)	Rachael Leigh Cook and Brendan Penny	Martin Wood	August 12, 2017	2.05		Yes
Eat, Play, Love (SN)	Jen Lilley and Jason Cermak	Chrisite Will Wolf	August 19, 2017	1.97		Yes
At Home in Mitford (SN)	Andie MacDowell and Cameron Mathison	Gary Harvey	August 20, 2017	1.34		Yes
Sun, Sand, and Romance (SN)	Tricia Helfer and Paul Campbell	Mark Rosman	August 26, 2017	2.15		Yes
Falling for Vermont (FH)	Julie Gonzalo and Benjamin Ayres	David Winning	September 23, 2017	2.59		Yes
Harvest Love (FH)	Jen Lilley and Ryan Paevey	Christie Will Wolf	September 30, 2017	2.72		Yes
All of My Heart: Inn Love (FH)	Lacey Chabert and Brennan Elliott	Terry Ingram	October 7, 2017	2.78		Yes
Love Struck Cafe (FH)	Sarah Jane Morris and Andrew Walker	Mike Robe	October 14, 2017	2.59		Yes
A Harvest Wedding (FH)	Jill Wagner and Victor Webster	Steven R. Monroe	October 21, 2017	2.72		Yes
Good Witch: Spellbound (FH)	Catherine Bell and James Denton	Craig Pryce	October 22, 2017	2.70		Yes
Marry Me at Christmas (CtC)	Rachel Skarsten and Trevor Donovan	Terry Ingram	October 28, 2017	3.37		Yes
Christmas Festival of Ice (CtC)	Taylor Cole and Damon Runyan	Bradley Walsh	November 4, 2017	3.16		Yes
Miss Christmas (CtC)	Brooke D'Orsay and Marc Blucas	Mike Rohl	November 5, 2017	3.62		Yes
The Sweetest Christmas (CtC)	Lacey Chabert and Jonathan Adams	Terry Ingram	November 11, 2017	3.88		Yes
Enchanted Christmas (CtC)	Alexa PenaVega and Carlos PenaVega	Terry Cunningham	November 12, 2017	3.65		No
Coming Home For Christmas (CtC)	Danica McKellar and Neal Bledsoe	Mel Damski	November 18, 2017	4.11		Yes
A Gift to Remember (CtC)	Ali Liebert and Peter Porte	Kevin Fair	November 19, 2017	3.88		Yes
With Love, Christmas (CtC)	Emilie Ullerup and Aaron O'Connell	Marita Grabiak	November 22, 2017	3.58		Yes
The Mistletoe Inn (CtC)	Alicia Witt and David Alpay	Alex Wright	November 23, 2017	3.45		Yes
Finding Santa (CtC)	Jodie Sweetin and Eric Winter	David Winning	November 24, 2017	4.06		Yes
The Christmas Train* (HHoF) (CtC)	Dermot Mulroney and Kimberly Williams-Paisley	Ron Oliver	November 25, 2017	4.87		Yes
Switched for Christmas (CtC)	Candace Cameron Bure and Eion Bailey	Lee Friedlander	November 26, 2017	5.17		Yes
Christmas in Evergreen (CtC)	Ashley Williams and Teddy Sears	Alex Zamm	December 2, 2017	3.96		Yes
Christmas at Holly Lodge (CtC)	Alison Sweeney and Jordan Bridges	Jem Garrard	December 3, 2017	3.87		Yes
The Christmas Cottage (CtC)	Merritt Patterson and Steve Lund	Paul A. Kaufman	December 9, 2017	4.57		Yes
Sharing Christmas (CtC)	Ellen Hollman and Bobby Campo	Peter Sullivan	December 10, 2017	3.69		Yes
Christmas Next Door (CtC)	Jesse Metcalfe and Fiona Gubelmann	Jonathan Wright	December 16, 2017	4.42		Yes
Christmas Connection (CtC)	Brooke Burns and Tom Everett Scott	Steven R. Monroe	December 17, 2017	3.99		Yes
Christmas Getaway (CtC)	Bridget Regan and Travis Van Winkle	Mel Damski	December 23, 2017	4.38		Yes
When Calls The Heart: The Christmas Wishing Tree (CtC)	Erin Krakow and Daniel Lissing	Neill Fearnley	December 25, 2017	3.61		Yes
Royal New Year's Eve (CtC)	Jessy Schram and Samuel Page	Monika Mitchell	December 30, 2017	3.91		Yes

(W) Winterfest, (CtVD) Countdown to Valentine's Day, (SF) Spring Fling, (JW) June Weddings, (SN) Summer Nights, (FH) Fall Harvest, and (CtC) Countdown to Christmas are seasonal programming blocks.
- Simultaneous premiere on HC and HMM.

=== Hallmark Movies & Mysteries ===
Movie	Starring	Director	Original airdate	Viewers	Ref	DVD
Garage Sale Mystery: The Art of Murder	Lori Loughlin and Steve Bacic	K.T. Donaldson	January 8, 2017	1.11		Yes
Framed for Murder: A Fixer Upper Mystery	Jewel Kilcher and Colin Ferguson	Mark Jean	January 15, 2017	1.32		Yes
An Uncommon Grace	Jes Macallan and Sean Faris	David Mackay	February 12, 2017	1.29		Yes
Signed, Sealed, Delivered: Higher Ground	Eric Mabius and Kristin Booth	Kevin Fair	February 19, 2017	1.11		Yes
Dead Over Heels: An Aurora Teagarden Mystery	Candace Cameron Bure and Yannick Bisson	Terry Ingram	March 19, 2017	1.31		Yes
Murder, She Baked: Just Desserts	Alison Sweeney and Cameron Mathison	K.T. Donaldson	March 26, 2017	1.31		Yes
Concrete Evidence: A Fixer Upper Mystery	Jewel Kilcher and Colin Ferguson	Mark Jean	April 2, 2017	1.29		Yes
Hailey Dean Mystery: Deadly Estate	Kellie Martin and Matthew MacCaull	Terry Ingram	April 9, 2017	1.11		Yes
A Bundle of Trouble: An Aurora Teagarden Mystery	Candace Cameron Bure and Yannick Bisson	Kevin Fair	May 21, 2017	1.38		Yes
Site Unseen: An Emma Fielding Mystery	Courtney Thorne-Smith and James Tupper	Douglas Barr	June 4, 2017	1.24		Yes
Home for Christmas Day	Catherine Bell and Victor Webster	Gary Harvey	July 16, 2017	1.34		Yes
Garage Sale Mystery: The Beach Murder	Lori Loughlin and Steve Bacic	Neill Fearnley	August 6, 2017	1.59		Yes
Garage Sale Mystery: Murder by Text	Lori Loughlin and Steve Bacic	Neill Fearnley	August 13, 2017	1.65		Yes
Garage Sale Mystery: Murder Most Medieval	Lori Loughlin and Steve Bacic	Neill Fearnley	August 20, 2017	1.35		Yes
Garage Sale Mystery: A Case of Murder	Lori Loughlin and Steve Bacic	Neill Fearnley	August 27, 2017	1.65		Yes
Signed, Sealed, Delivered: Home Again	Eric Mabius and Kristin Booth	Kevin Fair	September 24, 2017	1.25		Yes
Gourmet Detective: Eat, Drink, and be Buried	Dylan Neal and Brooke Burns	Mark Jean	October 8, 2017	0.89		Yes
Hailey Dean Mystery: Dating is Murder	Kellie Martin and Matthew MacCaull	Michael Robison	October 15, 2017	1.15		Yes
Darrow & Darrow	Kimberly Williams-Paisley and Tom Cavanagh	Peter DeLuise	October 22, 2017	0.94		Yes
The Perfect Christmas Present	Tara Holt and Samuel Page	Blair Hayes	November 4, 2017	1.34		Yes
Christmas in the Air	Catherine Bell and Eric Close	Martin Wood	November 5, 2017	1.36		Yes
A Song for Christmas	Becca Tobin and Kevin McGarry	R. C. Newey	November 11, 2017	1.31		Yes
Engaging Father Christmas	Erin Krakow and Niall Matter	David Winning	November 12, 2017	1.84		Yes
Christmas Homecoming	Julie Benz and Michael Shanks	Paul A. Kaufman	November 18, 2017	1.55		Yes
A Bramble House Christmas	Autumn Reeser and David Haydn-Jones	Steven R. Monroe	November 19, 2017	1.66		Yes
A Joyous Christmas	Natalie Knepp and Michael Rady	Allan Harmon	November 26, 2017	1.25		Yes
Christmas in Angel Falls	Rachel Boston and Paul Greene	Bradley Walsh	December 2, 2017	1.77		No
Magical Christmas Ornaments	Jessica Lowndes and Brendan Penny	Don McBrearty	December 3, 2017	1.39		Yes
Christmas Encore	Maggie Lawson and Brennan Elliott	Bradley Walsh	December 9, 2017	1.22		No
Karen Kingsbury's Maggie's Christmas Miracle	Jill Wagner and Luke Macfarlane	Michael Robison	December 10, 2017	1.66		Yes
Romance at Reindeer Lodge	Nicky Whelan and Josh Kelly	Colin Theys	December 17, 2017	2.08		Yes
Rocky Mountain Christmas	Lindy Booth and Kristoffer Polaha	Tibor Takács	December 22, 2017	2.18		Yes

== 2018 ==
=== Hallmark Channel ===
Movie	Starring	Director	Original airdate	Viewers	Ref	DVD
Love on the Slopes (W)	Katrina Bowden and Thomas Beaudoin	Paul Ziller	January 6, 2018	2.80		Yes
Frozen in Love (W)	Rachael Leigh Cook and Niall Matter	Scott Smith	January 13, 2018	2.61		Yes
One Winter Weekend (W)	Taylor Cole and Jack Turner	Gary Yates	January 20, 2018	3.03		Yes
Winter's Dream (W)	Kristy Swanson and Dean Cain	David Winning	January 27, 2018	2.58		Yes
My Secret Valentine (CtVD)	Lacey Chabert and Andrew W. Walker	Bradley Walsh	February 3, 2018	3.05		Yes
Very, Very Valentine (CtVD)	Danica McKellar and Cameron Mathison	Don McBrearty	February 10, 2018	2.44		Yes
Cooking with Love (CtVD)	Ali Liebert and Brett Dalton	Jem Garrard	February 11, 2018	1.82		Yes
Wedding March 3: Here Comes the Bride	Josie Bissett and Jack Wagner	David Weaver	February 17, 2018	2.10		Yes
Royal Hearts	Cindy Busby and Andrew Cooper	James Brolin	February 24, 2018	2.64		Yes
Love, Once and Always	Amanda Schull and Peter Porte	Allan Harmon	March 10, 2018	2.20		Yes
The Sweetest Heart (SF)	Julie Gonzalo and Chris McNally	Steven R. Monroe	March 17, 2018	2.23		Yes
Royal Matchmaker (SF)	Bethany Joy Lenz and Will Kemp	Michael Rohl	March 24, 2018	2.89		Yes
Home by Spring (SF)	Poppy Drayton and Steven R. McQueen	Dwight H. Little	March 31, 2018	2.14		Yes
Once Upon a Prince (SF)	Megan Park and Jonathan Keltz	Alexander JF Wright	April 7, 2018	2.63		Yes
The Beach House (HHoF)	Minka Kelly and Chad Michael Murray	Roger Spottiswoode	April 28, 2018	2.80		Yes
Royally Ever After	Fiona Gubelmann and Torrance Coombs	Lee Friedlander	May 19, 2018	2.02		Yes
Marrying Mr. Darcy (JW)	Cindy Busby and Ryan Paevey	Steven R. Monroe	June 2, 2018	2.74		Yes
The Perfect Bride: Wedding Bells (JW)	Pascale Hutton and Kavan Smith	Alex Wright	June 9, 2018	2.06		Yes
Love at First Dance (JW)	Becca Tobin and Niall Matter	Mark Jean	June 16, 2018	2.12		Yes
Wedding March 4: Something Old, Something New (JW)	Jack Wagner and Josie Bissett	Peter DeLuise	June 23, 2018	1.97		Yes
Yes, I Do (JW)	Jen Lilley and Marcus Rosner	Christie Will Wolf	June 30, 2018	1.80		No
Love on Safari (SN)	Lacey Chabert and Jon Cor	Leif Bristow	July 28, 2018	2.61		Yes
A Summer to Remember (SN)	Catherine Bell and Cameron Mathison	Martin Wood	August 4, 2018	2.27		Yes
Love at Sea (SN)	Alexa PenaVega and Carlos PenaVega	Mel Damski	August 11, 2018	2.23		Yes
Pearl in Paradise (SN)	Jill Wagner and Kristoffer Polaha	Gary Yates	August 18, 2018	2.06		Yes
Season for Love (SN)	Autumn Reeser and Marc Blucas	Jill Carter	August 25, 2018	2.37		Yes
Wedding of Dreams	Debbie Gibson and Robert Gant	Pat Williams	September 8, 2018	2.00		Yes
Love in Design	Danica McKellar and Andrew W. Walker	Steven R. Monroe	September 15, 2018	2.22		Yes
Truly, Madly, Sweetly (FH)	Nikki DeLoach and Dylan Neal	Ron Oliver	September 22, 2018	2.69		Yes
All of My Heart: The Wedding (FH)	Lacey Chabert and Brennan Elliott	Terry Ingram	September 29, 2018	2.71		Yes
Falling for You (FH)	Taylor Cole and Tyler Hynes	Peter DeLuise	October 6, 2018	2.11		Yes
Under the Autumn Moon (FH)	Lindy Booth and Wes Brown	Gary Yates	October 13, 2018	2.44		Yes
Love, of Course (FH)	Kelly Rutherford and Cameron Mathison	Lee Friedlander	October 20, 2018	2.56		Yes
Good Witch: Tale of Two Hearts (FH)	Catherine Bell and James Denton	Michael Kennedy	October 21, 2018	2.36		Yes
Christmas at Pemberley Manor (CtC)	Jessica Lowndes and Michael Rady	Colin Theys	October 27, 2018	3.57		Yes
Christmas Joy (CtC)	Danielle Panabaker and Matt Long	Monika Mitchell	November 3, 2018	3.37		Yes
Road to Christmas (CtC)	Jessy Schram and Chad Michael Murray	Allan Harmon	November 4, 2018	2.71		Yes
It's Christmas, Eve (CtC)	LeAnn Rimes and Tyler Hynes	Tibor Takács	November 10, 2018	4.17		Yes
Christmas in Love (CtC)	Brooke D'Orsay and Daniel Lissing	Don McBrearty	November 11, 2018	3.66		Yes
Christmas at Graceland (CtC)	Kellie Pickler and Wes Brown	Eric Close	November 17, 2018	4.66		Yes
Christmas in Evergreen: Letters to Santa (CtC)	Jill Wagner and Mark Deklin	Sean McNamara	November 18, 2018	4.00		Yes
Reunited at Christmas (CtC)	Nikki DeLoach and Mike Faiola	Steven R. Monroe	November 21, 2018	2.96		Yes
Christmas at the Palace (CtC)	Merritt Patterson and Andrew Cooper	Peter Hewitt	November 22, 2018	3.27		Yes
Pride, Prejudice, and Mistletoe (CtC)	Lacey Chabert and Brendan Penny	Don McBrearty	November 23, 2018	3.90		Yes
Christmas Everlasting (HHoF) (CtC)	Tatyana Ali and Dondre T. Whitfield	Ron Oliver	November 24, 2018	3.53		Yes
A Shoe Addict's Christmas (CtC)	Candace Cameron Bure and Luke Macfarlane	Michael Robison	November 25, 2018	4.24		Yes
Mingle All the Way (CtC)	Jen Lilley and Brant Daugherty	Allan Harmon	December 1, 2018	3.87		Yes
A Majestic Christmas (CtC)	Jerrika Hinton and Christian Vincent	Pat Kiely	December 2, 2018	2.63		Yes
Homegrown Christmas (CtC)	Lori Loughlin and Victor Webster	Mel Damski	December 8, 2018	3.81		Yes
Welcome to Christmas (CtC)	Eric Mabius and Jennifer Finnigan	Gary Harvey	December 9, 2018	3.43		Yes
Entertaining Christmas (CtC)	Jodie Sweetin and Brendan Fehr	Robin Dunne	December 15, 2018	2.71		Yes
A Gingerbread Romance (CtC)	Tia Mowry-Hardrict and Duane Henry	Richard Gabai	December 16, 2018	2.74		Yes
Jingle Around the Clock (CtC)	Brooke Nevin and Michael Cassidy	Paul Ziller	December 22, 2018	3.35		Yes
Christmas Made to Order (CtC)	Alexa PenaVega and Jonathan Bennett	Sam Irvin	December 23, 2018	3.49		Yes
When Calls the Heart: The Greatest Christmas Blessing (CtC)	Erin Krakow and Jack Wagner	Neill Fearnley	December 25, 2018	3.74		Yes
A Midnight Kiss (CtC)	Adelaide Kane and Carlos PenaVega	JB Sugar	December 29, 2018	2.31		Yes

(W) Winterfest, (CtVD) Countdown to Valentine's Day, (SF) Spring Fever, (JW) June Weddings, (SN) Summer Nights, (FH) Fall Harvest, and (CtC) Countdown to Christmas are seasonal programming blocks.

=== Hallmark Movies & Mysteries ===
Movie	Starring	Director	Original airdate	Viewers	Ref	DVD
Last Scene Alive: An Aurora Teagarden Mystery	Candace Cameron Bure and Yannick Bisson	Martin Wood	January 7, 2018	1.29		Yes
Past Malice: An Emma Fielding Mystery	Courtney Thorne-Smith and James Tupper	Kevin Fair	January 14, 2018	1.22		Yes
Morning Show Mystery: Mortal Mishaps	Holly Robinson Peete and Rick Fox	Terry Ingram	January 21, 2018	1.29		Yes
Signed, Sealed, Delivered: The Road Less Traveled	Eric Mabius and Kristin Booth	Kevin Fair	February 11, 2018	1.16		Yes
Deadly Deed: A Fixer Upper Mystery	Jewel Kilcher and Colin Ferguson	Mark Jean	March 11, 2018	1.08		Yes
Reap What You Sew: An Aurora Teagarden Mystery	Candace Cameron Bure and Marilu Henner	Terry Ingram	April 15, 2018	1.49		Yes
Darrow & Darrow: In the Key of Murder	Kimberly Williams-Paisley and Tom Cavanagh	Mel Damski	May 6, 2018	N/A		Yes
Hailey Dean Mysteries: 2+2=Murder	Kellie Martin and Chad Lowe	Michael Robison	June 3, 2018	1.25		Yes
Hailey Dean Mysteries: A Marriage Made for Murder	Kellie Martin and Chad Lowe	Michael Robison	June 10, 2018	1.23		Yes
Hailey Dean Mysteries: A Will to Kill	Kellie Martin and Chad Lowe	Michael Robison	June 17, 2018	1.51		Yes
Signed, Sealed, Delivered: To the Altar	Eric Mabius and Kristin Booth	Kevin Fair	July 15, 2018	1.46		Yes
Morning Show Mysteries: Murder on the Menu	Holly Robinson Peete and Rick Fox	Kevin Fair	July 22, 2018	1.04		Yes
Aurora Teagarden Mysteries: The Disappearing Game	Candace Cameron Bure and Niall Matter	Terry Ingram	July 29, 2018	1.53		Yes
Garage Sale Mysteries: The Pandora's Box Murders	Lori Loughlin and Steve Bacic	Neill Fearnley	August 5, 2018	1.51		Yes
Garage Sale Mysteries: The Mask Murder	Lori Loughlin and Steve Bacic	Mel Damski	August 12, 2018	1.50		Yes
Garage Sale Mysteries: Picture a Murder	Lori Loughlin and Steve Bacic	Neill Fearnley	August 19, 2018	1.53		Yes
Garage Sale Mysteries: Murder in D Minor	Lori Loughlin and Steve Bacic	Neill Fearnley	August 26, 2018	1.59		Yes
Darrow & Darrow: Body of Evidence	Kimberly Williams-Paisley and Tom Cavanagh	Mel Damski	October 14, 2018	0.78		Yes
Marrying Father Christmas (MoC)	Erin Krakow and Niall Matter	David Winning	November 4, 2018	1.44		Yes
A Veteran's Christmas (MoC)	Eloise Mumford and Sean Faris	Mark Jean	November 11, 2018	1.77		Yes
Return to Christmas Creek (MoC)	Tori Anderson and Stephen Huszar	Don McBrearty	November 17, 2018	1.51		Yes
A Godwink Christmas (MoC)	Kimberley Sustad and Paul Campbell	Michael Robison	November 18, 2018	1.95		Yes
Last Vermont Christmas (MoC)	Erin Cahill and Justin Bruening	David Jackson	November 19, 2018	1.14		Yes
Hope at Christmas (MoC)	Scottie Thompson and Ryan Paevey	Alex Wright	November 20, 2018	1.29		Yes
Christmas on Honeysuckle Lane (MoC)	Alicia Witt and Colin Ferguson	Maggie Greenwald	November 24, 2018	1.86		Yes
Christmas Wonderland (MoC)	Emily Osment and Ryan Rottman	Sean Olson	December 1, 2018	1.49		Yes
Once Upon a Christmas Miracle (MoC)	Aimee Teegarden and Brett Dalton	Gary Yates	December 2, 2018	2.15		Yes
Memories of Christmas (MoC)	Christina Milian and Mark Taylor	Tibor Takács	December 8, 2018	1.19		Yes
Time for Me to Come Home for Christmas (MoC)	Megan Park and Josh Henderson	David Winning	December 9, 2018	1.82		Yes
Northern Lights of Christmas (MoC)	Ashley Williams and Corey Sevier	Jonathan Wright	December 15, 2018	2.12		Yes
Small Town Christmas (MoC)	Ashley Newbrough and Kristoffer Polaha	Maclain Nelson	December 16, 2018	1.43		Yes
A Christmas for the Books (MoC)	Chelsea Kane and Drew Seeley	Letia Clouston	December 20, 2018	1.45		Yes
Christmas at Grand Valley (MoC)	Danica McKellar and Brennan Elliott	Don McCutcheon	December 21, 2018	1.68		Yes
Christmas Bells are Ringing (MoC)	Emilie Ullerup and Josh Kelly	Pat Williams	December 22, 2018	1.67		Yes

(MoC) Miracles of Christmas is a seasonal programming block.

== 2019 ==
=== Hallmark Channel ===
Movie	Starring	Director	Original airdate	Viewers	Ref	DVD
Winter Castle (W)	Emilie Ullerup and Kevin McGarry	Marita Grabiak	January 5, 2019	2.97		Yes
One Winter Proposal (W)	Taylor Cole and Jack Turner	Gary Yates	January 12, 2019	2.93		Yes
A Winter Princess (W)	Natalie Hall and Chris McNally	Allan Harmon	January 18, 2019	2.00		Yes
Winter Love Story (W)	Jen Lilley and Kevin McGarry	T.W. Peacocke	January 19, 2019	2.70		Yes
SnowComing (W)	Lindy Booth and Trevor Donovan	Peter DeLuise	January 26, 2019	2.91		Yes
Valentine in the Vineyard (CtVD)	Rachael Leigh Cook and Brendan Penny	Terry Ingram	February 2, 2019	2.72		Yes
The Story of Us (CtVD)	Maggie Lawson and Sam Page	Scott Smith	February 9, 2019	2.62		Yes
Love, Romance & Chocolate (CtVD)	Lacey Chabert and Will Kemp	Jonathan Wright	February 16, 2019	3.07		Yes
Love on the Menu	Autumn Reeser and Kavan Smith	Ellie Kanner	February 23, 2019	2.70		Yes
Just Add Romance	Meghann Fahy and Luke Macfarlane	Terry Ingram	March 2, 2019	2.22		Yes
Love Under the Rainbow	Jodie Sweetin and David Haydn-Jones	Tony Dean Smith	March 9, 2019	2.46		Yes
Flip That Romance (SF)	Julie Gonzalo and Tyler Hynes	Mark Jean	March 16, 2019	2.52		Yes
Love to the Rescue (SF)	Nikki DeLoach and Michael Rady	Steven R. Monroe	March 23, 2019	2.26		Yes
A Brush with Love (SF)	Arielle Kebbel and Nick Bateman	Peter DeLuise	March 30, 2019	2.06		Yes
True Love Blooms (SF)	Sara Rue and Jordan Bridges	Matthew Diamond	April 6, 2019	2.05		Yes
Bottled with Love (SF)	Bethany Joy Lenz and Andrew Walker	David Weaver	April 13, 2019	2.80		Yes
Easter Under Wraps (SF)	Fiona Gubelmann and Brendan Penny	Gary Yates	April 20, 2019	2.29		Yes
Love Takes Flight (HHoF)	Nikki DeLoach and Jeff Hephner	Steven R. Monroe	April 27, 2019	2.56		Yes
Paris, Wine & Romance (CtS)	Jen Lilley and Dan Jeannotte	Alex Zamm	May 4, 2019	2.26		Yes
A Feeling of Home (CtS)	Jonna Walsh and Nathan Parsons	Richard Gabai	May 11, 2019	2.06		Yes
Sailing into Love (CtS)	Leah Renee and Chris McNally	Lee Friedlander	May 18, 2019	2.12		Yes
From Friend to Fiancé (CtS)	Jocelyn Hudon and Ryan Paevey	Andrew Cymek	May 25, 2019	2.34		Yes
Love in the Sun (CtS)	Emeraude Toubia and Tom Maden	R.C. Newey	May 27, 2019	1.79		Yes
Wedding at Graceland (JW)	Kellie Pickler and Wes Brown	Eric Close	June 1, 2019	2.17		Yes
My Boyfriend's Back: Wedding March 5 (JW)	Josie Bissett and Jack Wagner	Mike Rohl	June 8, 2019	2.12		No
Love, Take Two (JW)	Heather Hemmens and Cornelius Smith Jr.	Allan Harmon	June 15, 2019	1.71		Yes
The Last Bridesmaid (JW)	Rachel Boston and Paul Campbell	Mark Jean	June 22, 2019	2.24		Yes
Sister of the Bride (JW)	Becca Tobin and Ryan Rottman	Sam Irvin	June 29, 2019	2.11		Yes
Love Unleashed	Jen Lilley and Christopher Russell	Christie Will Wolf	July 6, 2019	1.79		Yes
Rome in Love (SN)	Italia Ricci and Peter Porte	Eric Bross	July 27, 2019	2.07		Yes
Love and Sunshine (SN)	Danica McKellar and Mark Deklin	Ellie Kanner	August 3, 2019	2.04		Yes
A Taste of Summer (SN)	Roselyn Sanchez and Eric Winter	Peter DeLuise	August 10, 2019	1.88		Yes
A Summer Romance (SN)	Erin Krakow and Ryan Paevey	David Winning	August 17, 2019	2.39		Yes
All Summer Long (SN)	Autumn Reeser and Brennan Elliott	Peter DeLuise	August 24, 2019	2.17		Yes
My One & Only (SN)	Pascale Hutton and Sam Page	Gary Yates	August 31, 2019	2.02		Yes
Forever in My Heart	Merritt Patterson and Jack Turner	Steven R. Monroe	September 14, 2019	2.01		Yes
Over the Moon in Love (FH)	Jessica Lowndes and Wes Brown	Christie Will Wolf	October 5, 2019	2.00		Yes
Love, Fall & Order (FH)	Erin Cahill and Trevor Donovan	Clare Niederpruem	October 12, 2019	2.17		Yes
Good Witch: Curse from a Rose (FH)	Catherine Bell and James Denton	Craig Pryce	October 19, 2019	1.87		Yes
Christmas Wishes & Mistletoe Kisses (CtC)	Jill Wagner and Matthew Davis	D.J. Viola	October 26, 2019	2.64		Yes
Merry & Bright (CtC)	Jodie Sweetin and Andrew Walker	Gary Yates	November 2, 2019	2.87		Yes
Christmas Scavenger Hunt (CtC)	Kim Shaw and Kevin McGarry	M.J. Grabiak	November 3, 2019	2.81		Yes
Picture a Perfect Christmas (CtC)	Merritt Patterson and Jon Cor	Paul Ziller	November 9, 2019	3.36		Yes
The Mistletoe Secret (CtC)	Kellie Pickler and Tyler Hynes	Terry Ingram	November 10, 2019	2.70		Yes
Christmas Under the Stars (CtC)	Jesse Metcalfe and Autumn Reeser	Allan Harmon	November 16, 2019	3.37		Yes
Write Before Christmas (CtC)	Torrey DeVitto and Chad Michael Murray	Pat Williams	November 17, 2019	3.22		Yes
Christmas at Graceland: Home for the Holidays (CtC)	Kaitlin Doubleday and Adrian Grenier	Eric Close	November 23, 2019	2.66		Yes
Cherished Memories: A Gift to Remember 2 (CtC)	Ali Liebert and Peter Porte	Kevin Fair	November 24, 2019	2.50		Yes
A Christmas Duet (CtC)	Chaley Rose and Rome Flynn	Catherine Cyran	November 25, 2019	1.67		Yes
Check Inn to Christmas (CtC)	Rachel Boston and Wes Brown	Sam Irvin	November 26, 2019	1.92		Yes
The Christmas Club (CtC)	Elizabeth Mitchell and Cameron Mathison	Jeff Beesley	November 27, 2019	2.64		Yes
Christmas at the Plaza (CtC)	Elizabeth Henstridge and Ryan Paevey	Ron Oliver	November 28, 2019	3.00		Yes
Christmas in Evergreen: Tidings of Joy (CtC)	Maggie Lawson and Paul Greene	Sean McNamara	November 29, 2019	2.84		Yes
Christmas in Rome (CtC)	Lacey Chabert and Sam Page	Ernie Barbarash	November 30, 2019	3.70		Yes
Christmas Town (CtC)	Candace Cameron Bure and Tim Rozon	David Weaver	December 1, 2019	3.91		Yes
A Christmas Love Story (HHoF) (CtC)	Kristin Chenoweth and Scott Wolf	Eric Close	December 7, 2019	2.95		Yes
Christmas at Dollywood (CtC)	Danica McKellar and Niall Matter	Michael Robison	December 8, 2019	3.65		Yes
Holiday Date (CtC)	Matt Cohen and Brittany Bristow	Jeff Beesley	December 14, 2019	2.90		Yes
A Cheerful Christmas (CtC)	Erica Deutschman and Chad Connell	M.J. Grabiak	December 15, 2019	2.65		Yes
Double Holiday (CtC)	Carly Pope and Kristoffer Polaha	Don McBrearty	December 21, 2019	2.54		Yes
It's Beginning to Look A Lot Like Christmas (CtC)	Eric Mabius and Tricia Helfer	David Weaver	December 22, 2019	2.58		Yes
When Calls the Heart: Home for Christmas (CtC)	Erin Krakow and Jack Wagner	Mike Rohl	December 25, 2019	3.02		Yes

(W) Winterfest, (CtVD) Countdown to Valentine's Day, (SF) Spring Fever, (CtS) Countdown to Summer, (JW) June Weddings,(SN) Summer Nights, (FH) Fall Harvest, and (CtC) Countdown to Christmas are seasonal programming blocks.

=== Hallmark Movies & Mysteries ===
Movie	Starring	Director	Original airdate	Viewers	Ref	DVD
Ruby Herring Mysteries: Silent Witness	Taylor Cole and Stephen Huszar	Paul Ziller	January 20, 2019	1.22		Yes
Mystery 101	Jill Wagner and Kristoffer Polaha	Blair Hayes	January 27, 2019	1.50		Yes
Emma Fielding Mysteries: More Bitter than Death	Courtney Thorne-Smith and James Tupper	Kevin Fair	February 10, 2019	1.23		Yes
Chronicle Mysteries: Recovered	Alison Sweeney and Benjamin Ayres	Jason Bourque	February 17, 2019	1.26		Yes
Chronicle Mysteries: The Wrong Man	Alison Sweeney and Benjamin Ayres	Terry Ingram	February 24, 2019	1.40		Yes
Chronicle Mysteries: Vines that Bind	Alison Sweeney and Benjamin Ayres	David Weaver	March 3, 2019	1.27		Yes
Crossword Mysteries: A Puzzle to Die For	Lacey Chabert and Brennan Elliott	Don McCutcheon	March 10, 2019	1.60		Yes
Morning Show Mysteries: A Murder in Mind	Holly Robinson-Peete and Rick Fox	Kevin Fair	April 14, 2019	0.83		Yes
Morning Show Mysteries: Countdown to Murder	Holly Robinson-Peete and Rick Fox	Kevin Fair	April 21, 2019	0.91		Yes
Morning Show Mysteries: Death by Design	Holly Robinson-Peete and Rick Fox	Kevin Fair	April 28, 2019	1.07		Yes
Hailey Dean Mysteries: Death on Duty	Kellie Martin and Viv Leacock	Michael Robison	May 5, 2019	1.11		Yes
Hailey Dean Mysteries: A Prescription for Murder	Kellie Martin and Viv Leacock	Allan Harmon	May 12, 2019	1.08		Yes
Hailey Dean Mysteries: Killer Sentence	Kellie Martin and Viv Leacock	Michael Robison	May 19, 2019	1.04		Yes
Picture Perfect Mysteries: Newlywed and Dead	Alexa PenaVega and Carlos PenaVega	Ron Oliver	June 16, 2019	1.29		Yes
Mystery 101: Playing Dead	Jill Wagner and Kristoffer Polaha	Blair Hayes	June 23, 2019	1.22		Yes
Christmas Camp^{†}	Lily Anne Harrison and Bobby Campo	Jeff Fisher	July 11, 2019	1.00		Yes
Aurora Teagarden Mysteries: A Game of Cat and Mouse*	Candace Cameron Bure and Niall Matter	Mark Jean	August 4, 2019	0.96		Yes
Aurora Teagarden Mysteries: An Inheritance to Die For	Candace Cameron Bure and Niall Matter	Michael Robison	August 11, 2019	1.39		Yes
Aurora Teagarden Mysteries: A Very Foul Play	Candace Cameron Bure and Niall Matter	Martin Wood	August 18, 2019	1.44		Yes
Chronicle Mysteries: The Deep End	Alison Sweeney and Benjamin Ayres	Nimisha Mukerji	August 25, 2019	1.35		Yes
Witness to Murder: A Darrow Mystery*	Kimberly Williams-Paisley and Tom Cavanagh	Michael Robison	September 8, 2019	0.89		Yes
Mystery 101: Words Can Kill	Jill Wagner and Kristoffer Polaha	Andy Mikita	September 15, 2019	1.44		Yes
Mystery 101: Dead Talk	Jill Wagner and Kristoffer Polaha	Winnifred Jong	September 22, 2019	1.41		Yes
Ruby Herring Mysteries: Her Last Breath	Taylor Cole and Stephen Huszar	Fred Gerber	September 29, 2019	0.90		Yes
Matchmaker Mysteries: A Killer Engagement	Danica McKellar and Victor Webster	David Mackay	October 6, 2019	1.11		Yes
Crossword Mysteries: Proposing Murder	Lacey Chabert and Brennan Elliott	Don McCutcheon	October 13, 2019	1.16		Yes
A Merry Christmas Match (MoC)	Ashley Newbrough and Kyle Dean Massey	Jake Helgren	October 25, 2019	0.90		Yes
Nostalgic Christmas (MoC)	Brooke D'Orsay and Trevor Donovan	J.B. Sugar	October 31, 2019	0.94		Yes
Two Turtle Doves (MoC)	Nikki DeLoach and Michael Rady	Lesley Demetriades	November 1, 2019	1.07		Yes
A Blue Ridge Mountain Christmas (MoC)	Rachael Leigh Cook and Benjamin Ayres	David Winning	November 7, 2019	1.15		Yes
Holiday for Heroes (MoC)	Melissa Claire Egan and Marc Blucas	Clare Niederpruem	November 8, 2019	1.34		Yes
A Christmas Miracle (MoC)	Tamera Mowry-Housley and Brooks Darnell	Tibor Takács	November 14, 2019	0.91		Yes
A Godwink Christmas: Meant for Love (MoC)	Cindy Busby and Benjamin Hollingsworth	Paul Ziller	November 17, 2019	1.23		Yes
Holiday Hearts (MoC)	Ashley Williams and Paul Campbell	Allan Harmon	November 23, 2019	1.50		Yes
Our Christmas Love Song (MoC)	Alicia Witt and Brendan Hines	Gary Yates	November 24, 2019	1.19		Yes
Sense, Sensibility & Snowmen (MoC)	Erin Krakow and Luke Macfarlane	David Winning	November 30, 2019	1.19		Yes
A Homecoming for the Holidays (MoC)	Laura Osnes and Stephen Huszar	Catherine Cyran	December 7, 2019	1.22		Yes
Time for You to Come Home for Christmas (MoC)	Alison Sweeney and Lucas Bryant	Terry Ingram	December 8, 2019	1.18		Yes
Christmas in Montana (MoC)	Kellie Martin and Colin Ferguson	T.W. Peacocke	December 14, 2019	1.75		Yes
Angel Falls: A Novel Holiday (MoC)	Jen Lilley and Carlo Marks	Jonathan Wright	December 15, 2019	1.41		No
Christmas on My Mind (MoC)	Ashley Greene and Andrew Walker	Maclain Nelson	December 21, 2019	1.54		Yes
A Family Christmas Gift (MoC)	Holly Robinson Peete and Dion Johnstone	Kevin Fair	December 22, 2019	1.00		Yes

(MoC) Miracles of Christmas is a seasonal programming block.
- Simultaneous premiere on HC and HMM.
† Part of Gold Crown Christmas Week: Christmas in July.

== See also ==
- List of Hallmark Hall of Fame episodes (and Category)
- List of programs broadcast by Hallmark Channel (and Category)
- List of Hallmark Channel Original Movies
