= List of Hallmark Channel Original Movies =

This is a list of television films produced for the cable networks Hallmark Channel (HC) and Hallmark Mystery (HMM). Such films are currently called Hallmark Channel Original Movies and Hallmark Mysteries.

The Hallmark Channel was officially launched in August 2001, with its sister channel Hallmark Movies & Mysteries (originally Hallmark Movie Channel) launched in January 2004. In addition to stand-alone original films, both channels broadcast a number of original film series, including Garage Sale Mysteries, Jesse Stone, Signed, Sealed, Delivered, Aurora Teagarden Mysteries and The Good Witch, as well having produced mystery-themed wheel series.

The Hallmark Channel achieved its highest-ever broadcast premiere ratings with the 2014 original movie Christmas Under Wraps, starring Candace Cameron Bure, which was watched by 5.8 million viewers. Both networks receive their highest ratings during their "Countdown to Christmas" period, with a succession of festive original films being broadcast from late October to late December.

A number of these films are also carried in Canada by the W Network and Citytv under content distribution agreements with Hallmark parent Crown Media; the vast majority of Hallmark Channel films are filmed in Canada and thus qualify for Canadian content quotas. In the United Kingdom, Hallmark Original Movies are shown on Movies 24, a sister channel.

Hallmark Channel Original Movies by year
2000 – 2001 – 2002 – 2003 – 2004 – 2005 – 2006 – 2007 – 2008 – 2009
2010 – 2011 – 2012 – 2013 – 2014 – 2015 – 2016 – 2017 – 2018 – 2019
2020 – 2021 – 2022 – 2023 – 2024 – 2025 – 2026

== Umbrella series ==
The channels have broadcast a number of umbrella or 'wheel series', featuring premieres of original films.

Year	Series name	Channel	Format	Ref
2005–08	Mystery Movie (MM) (HC's Mystery Wheel)	Hallmark Channel	4-film series, premiering 4 films apiece annually	
2013–14	Walden Family Theater (WFT)	Hallmark Channel	6 films, premiering annually	
2014–present	Hallmark Hall of Fame (HHoF)*	Hallmark Channel	2 films, premiering annually	
2015–present	Mystery Wheel (MW)	Hallmark Mystery	3-film series, premiering 3–4 films apiece annually	
2019–present	Signature Mystery (SM)	Hallmark Mystery	7-film series, premiering 1–4 films apiece annually	

* Hallmark Hall of Fame originally premiered back in 1951 on NBC, but its movies began to be shown exclusively on Hallmark Channel starting on November 30, 2014 with the release of One Christmas Eve.

== Seasonal programming ==
The channels also produce annual seasonal programming blocks, which include premieres of original films.

Year	Season name	Channel	Format	Ref
2010–present	Countdown to Christmas	HC	20+ films, premiering in October, November, and December	
2013–2024	Miracles of Christmas*	HMM	15+ films, premiering in October, November, and December	
2015–present	Loveuary^{†}	HC	4-5 films, premiering in February	
2015–2019; 2023	June Weddings	HC	4-5 films, premiering in June	
2015–present	Fall Into Love^{✤}	HC	5-8 films, premiering in August and September	
2016–present	Winter Escape^{#}	HC	5 films, premiering in January	
2016–present	Spring Into Love^{‡}	HC	4-5 films, premiering in March and April	
2016–present	Summer Nights	HC	3-10 films, premiering in June, July, and August	
2019; 2024	Countdown to Summer	HC	4-5 films, premiering in May	
2021–present	Christmas in July	HC	1-3 films, premiering in July	
2024–present	Passport to Love	HC	4 films, premiering in June	

* Formerly known as The Most Wonderful Movies of Christmas and The Most Wonderful Miracles of Christmas.
† Formerly known as Countdown to Valentine's Day and Love Ever After.
‡ Formerly known as Spring Fever and Spring Fling.
# Formerly known as Winterfest and New Year New Movies!.
✤ Formerly known as Fall Harvest.

== Film series ==
Some Hallmark films are a part of a larger film series. Below is an alphabetically sorted list of all film series and the number of films in each.

Year	Series name	Number of films	Main cast	Channel	Umbrella series	DVD
2015–2018	All of My Heart	3	Lacey Chabert, Brennan Elliott	HC		Yes
2018–2019	At Graceland	3	Kellie Pickler, Wes Brown, Kaitlin Doubleday, Adrian Grenier	HC		Yes
2015–2024	Aurora Teagarden Mysteries	21	Candace Cameron Bure, Skyler Samuels, Marilu Henner	HMM, H+	SM*	Yes
2023–2024	Cherry Lane	4	Catherine Bell, Erin Cahill, Jonathan Bennett	HC, H+		Yes
2017–2020	Christmas in Evergreen	4	Ashley Williams, Jill Wagner, Maggie Lawson, Rukiya Bernard	HC		Yes
2019–2021	Chronicle Mysteries	5	Alison Sweeney, Benjamin Ayres	HMM	SM	3/4
2019–2021	Crossword Mysteries	5	Lacey Chabert, Brennan Elliott	HMM	SM	Yes
2022–2024	Curious Caterer	5	Nikki DeLoach, Andrew Walker	HMM, HM		3/5
2017–2019	Darrow & Darrow	4	Kimberly Williams-Paisley, Tom Cavanagh	HMM		Yes
2008–2024	Debbie Macomber's The Miracle Series	5	Doris Roberts, Rob Morrow, Caroline Rhea, Rachel Boston	HC		Yes
2017–2019	Emma Fielding Mysteries	3	Courtney Thorne-Smith, James Tupper	HMM		Yes
2016–2018	Father Christmas	3	Erin Krakow, Niall Matter	HMM		Yes
2017–2018	Fixer Upper Mysteries	3	Jewel Kilcher, Colin Ferguson	HMM		Yes
2016	Flower Shop Mysteries	3	Brooke Shields, Brennan Elliott	HMM		Yes
2013–2022; 2026–present	Garage Sale Mystery	17	Lori Loughlin, Steve Bacic	HMC, HMM	MW*/SM	Yes
2018–2021	A Godwink Christmas	4	Kimberley Sustad, Cindy Busby, Brooke D'Orsay, Katherine Barrell	HMM		Yes
2008–2019	Good Witch	12	Catherine Bell, Catherine Disher, Chris Potter, James Denton	HC		Yes
2011–2013	Goodnight for Justice	3	Luke Perry	HMC		Yes
2015–2020	Gourmet Detective	5	Dylan Neal, Brooke Burns	HMM	MW	4/5
2024	The Groomsmen	3	B.J. Britt, Jonathan Bennett, Tyler Hynes	H+		Yes
2016–2019	Hailey Dean Mysteries	9	Kellie Martin	HMM	SM	Yes
2022–2025	Haul Out the Holly	3	Lacey Chabert, Wes Brown, Melissa Peterman	HC		2/3
2023–present	Haunted Harmony Mysteries	3	Tamera Mowry-Housley, Marco Grazzini, Risteárd Cooper	HMM, HC		1/3
2025	Hearts Around the Table	4	Ashley Newbrough, Mishael Morgan, Jake Epstein, Kathryn Davis	HC		Yes
2024–present	Holiday Touchdown	3	Hunter King, Holland Roden, Lyndsy Fonseca	HC		2/3
2016–2019	In the Vineyard	3	Rachael Leigh Cook, Brendan Penny	HC		Yes
2005–2008	Jane Doe	9	Lea Thompson	HC	MM	
2023–2024	The Jane Mysteries	4	Jodie Sweetin, Stephen Huszar	HMM, H+		2/4
2015	Jesse Stone	1 (9)	Tom Selleck	HC†		Yes
2023	The Love Club	4	Brittany Bristow, Lily Gao, Chantel Riley, Camille Stopps	HMN		Yes
2003–2011	Love Comes Softly Saga	11	Erin Cottrell, Katherine Heigl	HC		Yes
2024	Love on the Danube	3	Nazneen Contractor, Jessica Sipos, Sarah Power	H+		Yes
2020–2021	Martha's Vineyard Mysteries	4	Jesse Metcalfe, Sarah Lind	HMM		Yes
2019–2021	Matchmaker Mysteries	3	Danica McKellar, Victor Webster	HMM		Yes
2005–2008	McBride	10	John Larroquette, Matt Lutz, Marta DuBois	HC	MM	
2016–2019	The Mistletoe	3	Jaime King, Alicia Witt, Kellie Pickler	HC		2/3
2018–2021	Morning Show Mysteries	6	Holly Robinson Peete, Rick Fox, Colin Lawrence	HMM	SM*	Yes
2006–2008	Murder 101	4	Dick Van Dyke	HC	MM	
2015–2017; 2021–2026	Murder, She Baked / Hannah Swensen Mysteries	5;8	Alison Sweeney, Cameron Mathison, Victor Webster	HMM, HM, HC	MW	Yes
2019–2021	Mystery 101	7	Jill Wagner, Kristoffer Polaha	HMM		Yes
2023–2025	Mystery Island	4	Elizabeth Henstridge, Charlie Weber	HM		2/4
2003–2007	Mystery Woman	11	Kellie Martin, Clarence Williams III	HC	MM*	
2023	National Park Romance	3	Ashley Newbrough, Cindy Busby, Arielle Kebbel	HC		Yes
2018–2021	One Winter	3	Taylor Cole, Jack Turner, Rukiya Bernard, Dewshane Williams	HC		2/3
2019–2020	Picture Perfect Mysteries	3	Alexa PenaVega, Carlos PenaVega	HMM	SM	Yes
2019–2020	Ruby Herring Mysteries	3	Taylor Cole, Stephen Huszar	HMM		Yes
2000–2002	Sherlock Holmes	4	Matt Frewer, Kenneth Welsh	HC		
2013–2025	Signed, Sealed, Delivered	15	Eric Mabius, Kristin Booth, Crystal Lowe, Geoff Gustafson	HC, HMM, HM		Yes
2022–2025	Three Wise Men	3	Paul Campbell, Tyler Hynes, Andrew Walker	HC		Yes
2018–2023	Time to Come Home for Christmas	6	Megan Park, Alison Sweeney, Lacey Chabert, Jessy Schram, Holland Roden, Shenae Grimes-Beech	HMM		Yes
2001–2004	A Town Without Christmas	3	Peter Falk	HC		
2024	Unwrapping Christmas	4	Natalie Hall, Kathryn Davis, Ashley Newbrough, Cindy Busby	H+		Yes
2016–2021	The Wedding March	6	Josie Bissett, Jack Wagner	HC		4/6
2022–2023	The Wedding Veil	6	Lacey Chabert, Autumn Reeser, Alison Sweeney	HC		Yes
2019–2023	Winter Castle	3	Emilie Ullerup, Jocelyn Hudon, Katie Cassidy	HC		Yes

(HD) Hallmark Drama is a sister channel to HC and HMM.
* Film added to wheel series after an original stand-alone film.
† Jesse Stone films premiere on HC, but are repeated on, and considered to be a key franchise for, HMM.
+ Also TV series.

== Hallmark Entertainment ==
Some of the movies do not fall under any of the aforementioned groups. The following list consists of television films and miniseries produced for or by Hallmark Entertainment that did not premiere on either Hallmark Channel, its sister channels, or as part of the Hallmark Hall of Fame anthology series.

Movie	Starring	Director	Original airdate	Viewers	Ref	DVD
The 10th Kingdom (5-part miniseries)	Kimberly Williams-Paisley and John Larroquette	David Carson, Herbert Wise	February 27 – March 26, 2000 (NBC)			
Back to the Secret Garden	Camilla Belle and Cherie Lunghi	Michael Tuchner	September 2, 2001			
Jack and the Beanstalk: The Real Story (2-part miniseries)	Matthew Modine, Mia Sara and Vanessa Redgrave	Brian Henson	December 2 and December 4, 2001 (CBS)			
Hercules (2-part miniseries)	Paul Telfer and Leelee Sobieski	Roger Young	May 16, 2005 (NBC)			

== Hallmark Channel Original Movies ==
- List of Hallmark Channel Original Movies (2000s)
- List of Hallmark Channel Original Movies (2010s)
- List of Hallmark Channel Original Movies (2020s)

== Highest-rated premieres ==
=== Hallmark Channel ===
==== Top 10 Christmas premieres ====
No.	Movie	Lead cast	Year	Viewers (in millions)	Ref
1	Christmas Under Wraps	Candace Cameron Bure, David O'Donnell	2014	5.75	
2	Switched for Christmas	Candace Cameron Bure, Eion Bailey	2017	5.17	
3	The Christmas Train	Kimberly Williams-Paisley, Dermot Mulroney	2017	4.87	
4	Journey Back to Christmas	Candace Cameron Bure, Oliver Hudson	2016	4.84	
5	A Christmas Detour	Candace Cameron Bure, Paul Greene	2015	4.78	
6	Christmas at Graceland	Kellie Pickler, Wes Brown	2018	4.66	
7	My Christmas Love	Meredith Hagner, Bobby Campo	2016	4.59	
8	The Christmas Cottage	Merritt Patterson, Steve Lund	2017	4.57	
9	A Royal Christmas	Lacey Chabert, Stephen Hagan	2014	4.48	
10	My Christmas Dream	Danica McKellar, David Haydn-Jones	2016	4.45	

==== Within a calendar year ====
Year	Movie	Lead cast	Ratings (millions)	Ref
2010	The Good Witch's Gift	Catherine Bell, Chris Potter	3.60	
2011	A Christmas Wish	Kristy Swanson, Edward Herrmann	4.01	
2012	Help for the Holidays	Summer Glau, John Brotherton	3.64	
2013	A Very Merry Mix-Up	Alicia Witt, Mark Wiebe	4.35	
2014	Christmas Under Wraps	Candace Cameron Bure, David O'Donnell	5.75	
2015	A Christmas Detour	Candace Cameron Bure, Paul Greene	4.78	
2016	Journey Back to Christmas	Candace Cameron Bure, Oliver Hudson	4.84	
2017	Switched for Christmas	Candace Cameron Bure, Eion Bailey	5.17	
2018	Christmas at Graceland	Kellie Pickler, Wes Brown	4.66	
2019	Christmas Town	Candace Cameron Bure, Tim Rozon	3.91	
2020	Christmas Waltz	Lacey Chabert, Will Kemp	3.95	
2021	Christmas at Castle Hart	Lacey Chabert, Stuart Townsend	3.31	
2022	Three Wise Men and a Baby	Paul Campbell, Tyler Hynes, Andrew Walker	3.63	
2023	A Merry Scottish Christmas	Lacey Chabert, Scott Wolf	3.33	
2024	Holiday Touchdown: A Chiefs Love Story	Hunter King, Tyler Hynes	2.88	
2025	The Reluctant Royal	Andrew Walker, Emilie de Ravin	1.80	

=== Hallmark Movies & Mysteries ===
==== Top 10 Christmas premieres ====
No.	Movie	Lead cast	Year	Viewers (in millions)	Ref
1	Rocky Mountain Christmas	Lindy Booth, Kristoffer Polaha	2017	2.18	
2	Once Upon a Christmas Miracle	Aimee Teegarden, Brett Dalton	2018	2.15	
3	Northern Lights of Christmas	Ashley Williams, Corey Sevier	2018	2.12	
4	Romance at Reindeer Lodge	Nicky Whelan, Josh Kelly	2017	2.08	
5	A Godwink Christmas	Kimberley Sustad, Paul Campbell	2018	1.95	
6	Miracle in Bethlehem, PA	Laura Vandervoort, Benjamin Ayres	2023	1.91	
7	Time for Us to Come Home for Christmas	Lacey Chabert, Stephen Huszar	2020	1.90	
8	Christmas on Honeysuckle Lane	Alicia Witt, Colin Ferguson	2018	1.86	
9	Engaging Father Christmas	Erin Krakow, Niall Matter	2017	1.84	
10	Time for Me to Come Home for Christmas	Megan Park, Josh Henderson	2018	1.82	

==== Within a calendar year ====
Year	Movie	Lead cast	Ratings (millions)	Ref
2014	The Christmas Secret	Bethany Joy Lenz, John Reardon	0.93	
2015	Gourmet Detective	Dylan Neal, Brooke Burns	1.62	
2016	Hearts of Christmas	Emilie Ullerup, Kristoffer Polaha	1.62	
2017	Rocky Mountain Christmas	Lindy Booth, Kristoffer Polaha	2.18	
2018	Once Upon a Christmas Miracle	Aimee Teegarden, Brett Dalton	2.15	
2019	Christmas in Montana	Kellie Martin, Colin Ferguson	1.75	
2020	Time for Us to Come Home for Christmas	Lacey Chabert, Stephen Huszar	1.90	
2021	Aurora Teagarden Mysteries: Honeymoon, Honeymurder	Candace Cameron Bure, Niall Matter	1.90	
2022	Aurora Teagarden Mysteries: Haunted by Murder	Candace Cameron Bure, Niall Matter	1.75	
2023	Miracle in Bethlehem, PA	Laura Vandervoort, Benjamin Ayres	1.91	
2024	A Reason for the Season	Taylor Cole, Kevin McGarry	0.92	

== See also ==
- List of Hallmark Hall of Fame episodes (and Category)
- List of programs broadcast by Hallmark Channel (and Category)
