= In the Vineyard =

American-Canadian film series

In the Vineyard is an American-Canadian film series starring Rachael Leigh Cook and Brendan Penny. It airs on Hallmark Channel. The series debuted with the first of three films, Autumn in the Vineyard, premiering in 2016. The second installment in the series, Summer in the Vineyard, debuted in 2017. The third and final installment, Valentine in the Vineyard, aired around Valentine's Day 2019. The films follow the story of Francesca (Frankie) Baldwin and Nate DeLuca from feuding wineries in the town of St. Madeleine, California, as they are thrown together after their past romantic relationship that ended on a sour note.

The film series is based on the St. Helena Vineyard books by author Marina Adair.

== Cast ==
- Rachael Leigh Cook as Frankie Baldwin, a talented winemaker who has helped her father at the Baldwin family winery and sets out to make a mark for herself
- Brendan Penny as Nate DeLuca, a budding chef who returns to use his college education to manage grape crops in a winery in his hometown
- Laura Soltis as Carla DeLuca, matriarch of the DeLucas and Nate's mother
- Michael Kopsa as Charles Baldwin, patriarch of the Baldwins and Frankie and Jonah's father. Tom Butler previously played the character in the first film.
- Jeremy Guilbaut as Jonah Baldwin, the local police officer and Frankie's brother
- Marcus Rosner as Marco DeLuca, Nate's brother and manager at the DeLuca winery
- Ali Liebert as Hannah, Frankie's best friend and confidante and Marco's ex
- Tegan Moss as Lexi, Frankie's cousin and a baker who moves to town and catches Marco's attention

== Production ==
The first film was shot in River Stone winery near Oliver and Osoyoos in the South Okanagan Valley in British Columbia. The second installment of the film series, Summer in the Vineyard, was also shot in Okanagan Valley.

== Films ==
No.	Title	Directed by	Written by	Original release date
1	"Autumn in the Vineyard"	Scott Smith	Marina Adair, Suzette Couture	October 8, 2016
Frankie Baldwin has been working on her family winery but wants to do something of her own. When her father, Charles, hires an outsider to help out at the winery, on an impulse she buys the Sorrento farm from a friend who is in the middle of a divorce. It is only after the purchase that she finds out that she actually co-owns Sorrento with her former boyfriend and recently back-in-town Nate DeLuca who comes from the DeLuca winery. The two are forced to reach a compromise and decide to co-manage the property to bring in the harvest leading up to the Best Wine competition at the annual Autumn Harvest Festival.
2	"Summer in the Vineyard"	Martin Wood	Marina Adair, Julie Sherman Wolfe	August 12, 2017
As their first year at Sorrento Farms is coming to a close, Frankie and Nate are looking forward to debuting their first vintage wine during the town's annual 'Summerfest' celebration. When the host winery for Summerfest pulls out at the last minute, Nate volunteers Sorrento to replace them, thinking it will be great publicity for their fledgling operation. Frankie, however, is more concerned with whether she can have their first Cabernet ready on time. The pressure is on them both to make a big splash for Sorrento at Summerfest to ensure the viability of their winery going forward. These two headstrong paramours are about to find out if you really can mix business with pleasure.
3	"Valentine in the Vineyard"	Terry Ingram	Rick Garman	February 2, 2019
Nate proposes to Frankie who happily accepts but they are forced to keep it a secret when Lexie and Marco unexpectedly announce they're marrying on Valentines Day. Worried about the loan they took to expand Sorrento, Nate and Frankie decide to put any wedding plans on hold as they tend to their vines concerned that they may bud too soon and cause them heavy financial losses. As they help Lexie and Marco plan their wedding, they face some challenges in their own engagement while trying to prepare a surprise for one another.
