= Kevin Fair =

Canadian film director, television director

- Other name: Kevin G. Fair
- Occupations: Television and film director
- Years active: 1996–present

Kevin G. Fair is a Canadian television and film director known for his work on The WB/CW Superman prequel series Smallville.

== Career ==
Fair began his career as a third assistant director for Bruce McDonald's 1996 comedy Hard Core Logo. Throughout the next decade he would work as second assistant director for such films as: Suspicious River, Duets, Get Carter, Texas Rangers, Along Came a Spider, Josie and the Pussycats; and then as a first assistant director on Snow Dogs, Trapped, and The Core.

He has directed installments of Robson Arms, Hellcats, Supah Ninjah, CAT. 8, Beauty and the Beast, and extensively on the CBC drama Arctic Air. He directed TV movies Possessing Piper Rose and Lucky in Love.

=== Smallville ===
In 2006, during its fifth season, Fair joined The WB Superman series Smallville, which follows a young Clark Kent, before taking up the mantle Man of Steel. He first served as second unit director of green screen, then first assistant director on episodes "Hypnotic" and "Sleeper". Fair first helmed the seventh season installment "Siren", which was the first to feature the Black Canary (Alaina Huffman). He went on to direct some of the more critically and fan acclaimed episodes including the eighth year's premiere, "Odyssey", "Abyss", "Turbulence", "Stiletto", the ninth season premiere "Savior", featuring the introduction of General Zod (Callum Blue); "Roulette", "Escape", "Sacrifice", the premiere episode of the final season "Lazarus" and "Abandoned", featuring an appearance by Teri Hatcher. The final episode helmed by Fair was Part 1 of the series finale, with the second part being directed by series veteran Greg Beeman.

=== Signed, Sealed, Delivered ===
In 2014, Fair helmed two episodes of the Hallmark series Signed, Sealed, Delivered ("Soulmates" and "The Masterpiece"). After the series' transition into a TV film series for the network's sister channel, he joined the first, Signed, Sealed, Delivered for Christmas, as consulting producer and director. He went on to helm and executive produce nine more of the films.
