= Signed, Sealed, Delivered (TV series) =

American-Canadian drama/romantic comedy television series

- Promotional poster
- Genre: Comedy drama; Romance; Mystery
- Created by: Martha Williamson
- Starring: Eric Mabius; Kristin Booth; Crystal Lowe; Geoff Gustafson
- Composers: Hal Beckett; James Jandrisch
- Countries of origin: Canada; United States
- Original language: English
- No. of episodes: 25

Production
- Executive producers: Martha Williamson; Joel S. Rice; Scott Smith; Michael Prupas
- Producer: Harvey Kahn
- Production location: Vancouver, British Columbia, Canada
- Cinematography: Adam Sliwinski; Tyler Walzak
- Running time: 42–84 minutes
- Production company: Moon Water Productions

Original release
- Network: Hallmark Channel
- Release: October 12, 2013 – June 22, 2014
- Network: Hallmark Movies & Mysteries
- Release: November 23, 2014 – October 17, 2021
- Network: Hallmark Mystery
- Release: July 12, 2024 – present

Signed, Sealed, Delivered (also known as Lost Letter Mysteries) is a drama/romantic comedy television series that aired on the Hallmark Channel in 2014 from April 20 through June 22. Created by Touched by an Angel's Martha Williamson, Signed, Sealed, Delivered focuses on four dedicated United States Postal Service employees who work in the dead letter office. They take it upon themselves to track down intended recipients of undeliverable mail. Similarly to her previous program, the show promotes Williamson's Christian beliefs through the faith of the characters. It is set in Denver, Colorado but filmed mostly in the Vancouver area. On October 12, 2013, a two-hour pilot movie aired on Hallmark and was a ratings success. It was the number-one television movie on its airdate and the number-two movie for that week. The movie was watched by 1.72 million viewers. Following one season of the TV series, Hallmark announced Signed, Sealed, Delivered would transition to a series of television films on its Hallmark Mystery channel.

== Cast ==
=== Main ===
- Eric Mabius as Oliver O'Toole
- Kristin Booth as Shane O'Toole (nee McInerney)
- Crystal Lowe as Rita Haywith-Dorman
- Geoff Gustafson as Norman Xavier Dorman

=== Recurring ===
- Zak Santiago as Ramon Rodriguez, a man of many talents who became a friend of the Postables. (2 episodes & 7 films)
- Jill Morrison as colleague Hazel. (5 movies)
- Gregory Harrison as Joe O'Toole, Oliver's step-father who raised him. (7 films)
- Emilie Ullerup as Dale Travers, a police officer friend of Oliver's. (4 films)

=== Guest stars ===
- Valerie Bertinelli as Rebecca Starkwell
- Carol Burnett as Ardis Paine, Norman's grandmother
- Valerie Harper as Theresa Capodiamonte
- Marilu Henner as Glynis Rucker
- Della Reese as Cora Brandt
- Daphne Zuniga as Andrea Shmeckle

== Critical reception ==
Variety's Brian Lowry commented that it was "so old fashioned and hokey that it just might work." David Hinckley of New York Daily News gave it 3 stars out of 5 in 2014 and said that while all the characters were terribly likable, they spoke as if they were reading from Hallmark greeting cards.

Signed, Sealed, Delivered scored 58 out of 100 on Metacritic based on five "mixed or average" reviews.

== Episodes ==
No.	Title	Directed by	Written by	Original release date	Prod. code	U.S. viewers (millions)
Pilot	"Signed, Sealed, Delivered"	Scott Smith	Martha Williamson	October 12, 2013	#100-120	1.72
Oliver still believes stamped and mailed letters are important to human communication. The humdrum jobs of his dead letter mail experts Rita and Norman change when a technophile named Shane gets mistakenly transferred into their office. Note: Aired as a two-hour television film.
1	"Time to Start Livin'"	Scott Smith	Martha Williamson	April 20, 2014	#1001	1.70
Oliver wants to investigate a letter from ten-year-old boy alerting his grandmother he is running away after being inexplicably separated from her. Meanwhile, Shane, Rita and Norman prepare for new supervisor, Theresa Capodiamonte (Valerie Harper), a winner of the prestigious Dark of Night award, who challenges them to take greater risks with their deliveries. They discover that the boy's life is in danger, and they become determined to find the intended recipient of his letter. Theresa also realizes she has an unfulfilled lifelong dream.
2	"To Whom It May Concern"	Scott Smith	Martha Williamson	April 27, 2014	#1002	1.44
A mangled letter describes a young woman's search for a soldier who saved her life and helped her escape Afghanistan during the War in Afghanistan. The Army officer is untraceable by normal means and the team must find him, even if he does not want to be found. Their search reveals a number of war heroes who not only return to less than a hero's welcome, but are also homeless. Attempts to deliver an orphan's letter to a war hero changes his life while Theresa's pursuit of her dreams inspires the team.
3	"Soulmates"	Kevin Fair	Dawn DeKeyser	May 4, 2014	#1003	1.69
The team discovers an undeliverable love letter, and their investigation initially exposes more questions than answers. Their new supervisor Cora Brandt (Della Reese) also arrives with stricter policies and procedures. The letter contains a passionate plea from ranch owner Sam to his childhood sweetheart. However, a domino effect could occur for its recipient and the people in her life. After an unexpected twist, clues among the team's co-workers bring a resolution to the case.
4	"The Masterpiece"	Kevin Fair	Jeff Eckerle and Marilyn Osborn	May 11, 2014	#1004	1.30
Norman retrieves a package jamming the office mail chute. A letter attached to it is written by a man named Danny to his father. Both were sent to Henry Barrett three years ago. The team learns Henry lost his home and business after a bout with cancer, and he now spends his time living and working at a bar. There, they hear from Henry that he has not spoken to Danny since he left for college ten years ago to be an artist rather than take over the family's auto repair business. To learn more about Danny, the team opens the package to find a piece of art. At a gallery, they learn the piece was part of a triptych detailing Danny's life, which has been cut short when he died in a fire. The mailed piece reveals a baby painted on it. Henry is a grandfather and is asked to bring the piece with him when he meets Danny's wife and daughter.
5	"The Edge of Forever"	Lynne Stopkewich	Katherine Collins	May 18, 2014	#1005	1.44
A large box with an urn and a large envelope arrive in the office. The envelope has the name "Maggie" written on it and contains two separately addressed envelopes inside it. One is for Caitlyn Atkinson, the other is for Vanessa Doherty. The urn contains their mother's remains. Since the large envelope was addressed to someone else, the team searches for her. The women recall visiting a cabin with their mother in their younger days. The cabin belonged to their mother's friend, Maggie, who, when found, sends them on an adventure with their mother's ashes. The family was supposed to take a hike on September 11, 2001, when they learned the father died on one of the hijacked planes. The event caused the whole family to become bitter, even with each other. The daughters scatter their mother's remains when the hike was finally completed.
6	"The Future Me"	Lynne Stopkewich	Kerry Lenhart and John J. Sakmar	May 25, 2014	#1006	1.26
A letter, postmarked with a future date, sets off a chain reaction that leads the team on a surprising, emotional journey. As Rita prepares for the Miss Special Delivery pageant while being threatened by Glynis Rucker (Marilu Henner), an intimidating supervisor whose daughter is also competing, Oliver, Shane, and Norman find themselves in the middle of a couple's struggle for acceptance.
7	"Something Good"	Scott Smith	Dean Batali	June 1, 2014	#1007	1.27
A CD is found in the small bin of items that fell out of unsealed packages. The team listens to it and hears a single studio recording of someone's love song. Norman's cousin, Serge, who has a mental music memory recognizes the woman singing as Linda Hawkins from a local rock band. The male singer is not known. Linda tells the team the singer was very talented, and she hoped he would mail the song to her agent. She gives them the studio's address. Studio manager Jennifer Becker remembers the singer, Billy, with a last name that was difficult to pronounce. She adds he worked there in exchange for time recording. He also owned a vintage motorcycle. Billy Antonopoulos was involved in a motorcycle accident that impaired his memory. Shane believes Jennifer was for whom the song was written. She takes her to see Billy, whom she thought had moved on. She returns his guitar, and, as he slowly plays it, the song returns to him and he sings it for her. Meanwhile, Shane meets her old friend, Rebecca Starkwell (Valerie Bertinelli), the head of Special Projects from the Washington, D.C. post office who is in Denver to help with "awareness, goodwill and an increased reliance on the work of the post office."
8	"Dark of Night"	Scott Smith	Martha Williamson	June 8, 2014	#1008	1.61
A letter found in a stolen Bible makes its way to the Dead Letter Office ten years after it was written. It contains a dark secret that was written the same night the sender died. The letter reveals that Melissa, wife of D.A. Michael Wheeler, was raped the night before their wedding and Abby, their daughter, is the product of said rape. After the letter is delivered without complication, Wheeler, distraught, plans to kill the rapist, Carl Brackner, at a court hearing. Upon learning of his plans, Shane and Oliver take the information to Rebecca Starkwell who decides to reorganize the Dead Letter Office into a special task force reporting directly to her at Special Projects, giving the entire D.L.O. a promotion and Rita creates a nickname for their group - The Postables. To stop Wheeler from killing Brackner, Oliver, Shane, Norman and Rita confront Wheeler at the court hearing and reveal that his daughter needs a kidney from Brackner to survive her injuries from the original accident that killed her mother. Brackner, upon learning of Abby and her plight, donates the kidney and the Dead Letter Office receives not only the Distinguished Service Award from their branch, but the highest postal honor, The Dark of Night Award.
9	"The Treasure Box"	Mike Rohl	Martha Williamson	June 15, 2014	#1009	1.47
While Norman helps Rita prepare for the Miss Special Delivery pageant, Oliver and Shane head to a bank vault with a safe deposit key found in a puzzle box. They are told by vault manager Jason that the box's contents are about to be auctioned off. An alarm sounds while the three check out the box, the vault seals, and the bank clears out. Thinking they have only 13 hours of air, Jason finds the key needed to help open the box. Inside are letters from "January '08", wrapped in a ribbon. They document a long-distance love affair between Jonathan and Katherine, which ultimately reveal she has a rare case of pneumonia. Once free from the vault, Oliver and Shane locate "Jonathan", only to discover that he is the writer's great-grandson, Jonathan Walker IV. The letters were passed down through generations and contain the secret to true love. Back at the pageant, when Rita can't recall all the ways mail can be delivered, Oliver, at Shane's request, prays, and Rita remembers a comment Norman made the night before about mail delivery to the bottom of the Grand Canyon and wins.
10	"A Hope and a Future"	Mike Rohl	Brandi Harkonen	June 22, 2014	#1010	1.52
While the team attempts to reunite a mother with her twin sons that never knew each other, Norman learns about a grandmother (Carol Burnett) he never knew he had. Also, Shane helps Oliver make a decision about contacting his estranged wife.

== Made-for-TV films ==
No.	Title	Directed by	Written by	Original release date	Prod. code	U.S. viewers (millions)
1	"Signed, Sealed, Delivered for Christmas"	Kevin Fair	Story : Brandi Harkonen, Kerry Lenhart and John J. Sakmar; Teleplay : Martha Williamson	November 23, 2014	#111-120	0.755
An emotional holiday story in which the Postables work overtime to help a struggling family find hope on Christmas Eve. Guest stars include Marion Ross and Rob Estes.
2	"Signed, Sealed, Delivered: From Paris with Love"	Kevin Fair	Story : Martha Williamson and Brandi Harkonen; Teleplay : Martha Williamson	June 6, 2015	#112-120	0.830
The Postables deliver divorce papers to a happy couple, as well as Oliver's estranged wife, Holly (Poppy Montgomery), returning from Paris.
3	"Signed, Sealed, Delivered: Truth Be Told"	Kevin Fair	Story : Martha Williamson and Brandi Harkonen; Teleplay : Martha Williamson	September 13, 2015	#113-120	0.806
The Postables deliver a soldier's letter from Afghanistan to her daughter, while Oliver's estranged father, Joe (Gregory Harrison), brings him surprising news.
4	"Signed, Sealed, Delivered: The Impossible Dream"	Kevin Fair	Story : Martha Williamson and Brandi Harkonen; Teleplay : Martha Williamson	October 4, 2015	#114-120	0.798
The Postables travel to Washington, D.C., to bring a letter from an American prisoner of war before a Senate Hearing Committee. Also, Rita competes in the Miss Special Delivery Contest.
5	"Signed, Sealed, Delivered: From the Heart"	Lynne Stopkewich	Story : Martha Williamson and Brandi Harkonen; Teleplay : Martha Williamson	February 21, 2016	#115-120	0.807
6	"Signed, Sealed, Delivered: One in a Million"	Kevin Fair	Story : Martha Williamson and Brandi Harkonen; Teleplay : Martha Williamson	July 24, 2016	#116-120	1.021
7	"Signed, Sealed, Delivered: Lost Without You"	Kevin Fair	Story : Martha Williamson and Brandi Harkonen; Teleplay : Martha Williamson	September 25, 2016	#117-120	0.996
8	"Signed, Sealed, Delivered: Higher Ground"	Kevin Fair	Story : Martha Williamson and Brandi Harkonen; Teleplay : Martha Williamson	February 19, 2017	#118-120	1.114
9	"Signed, Sealed, Delivered: Home Again"	Kevin Fair	Martha Williamson	September 24, 2017	#119-120	1.245
Norman also meets Rita's parents, Bill (Barry Bostwick) and Sunny (Colleen Camp), while Oliver and Shane go steady.
10	"Signed, Sealed, Delivered: The Road Less Travelled"	Kevin Fair	Brandi Harkonen	February 11, 2018	#120-120	1.155
Meanwhile, both couples face troubles trying to communicate with their respective partners.
11	"Signed, Sealed, Delivered: To the Altar"	Kevin Fair	Martha Williamson	July 15, 2018	#121-120	1.455
12	"Signed, Sealed, Delivered: The Vows We Have Made"	Linda-Lisa Hayter	Martha Williamson	October 17, 2021	#122-120	1.371
Shane and Oliver's wedding day is approaching, while Rita and Norman plan to start a family, and the team helps a boy suffering from leukemia reunite with a friend.
13	"Signed, Sealed, Delivered: A Tale of Three Letters"	Linda-Lisa Hayter	Martha Williamson & Brandi Harkonen	July 12, 2024	#123-120	N/A
The Postables are back identifying the intended recipients of a trio of dead letters which have a surprising, personal impact on all of them.
14	"Signed, Sealed, Delivered: To the Moon and Back"	Linda-Lisa Hayter	Martha Williamson & Brandi Harkonen	April 26, 2025	#124-120	1.112
The Postables take a road trip to find the recipient of a lost letter and track down a musician who is the key to solving the case.

== Characters ==
- A dark grey cell indicates the character was not in the film.

Character	Title															
Character	Signed, Sealed, Delivered	Signed, Sealed, Delivered (10 episodes)	Signed, Sealed, Delivered for Christmas	From Paris with Love	Truth Be Told	The Impossible Dream	From the Heart	One in a Million	Lost Without You	Higher Ground	Home Again	The Road Less Traveled	To the Altar	The Vows We Have Made	A Tale of Three Letters	To the Moon and Back
Oliver O'Toole	Eric Mabius	Eric Mabius	Eric Mabius	Eric Mabius	Eric Mabius	Eric Mabius	Eric Mabius	Eric Mabius	Eric Mabius	Eric Mabius	Eric Mabius	Eric Mabius	Eric Mabius	Eric Mabius	Eric Mabius	Eric Mabius
Shane McInerney	Kristin Booth	Kristin Booth	Kristin Booth	Kristin Booth	Kristin Booth	Kristin Booth	Kristin Booth	Kristin Booth	Kristin Booth	Kristin Booth	Kristin Booth	Kristin Booth	Kristin Booth	Kristin Booth	Kristin Booth	Kristin Booth
Rita Haywith	Crystal Lowe	Crystal Lowe	Crystal Lowe	Crystal Lowe	Crystal Lowe	Crystal Lowe	Crystal Lowe	Crystal Lowe	Crystal Lowe	Crystal Lowe	Crystal Lowe	Crystal Lowe	Crystal Lowe	Crystal Lowe	Crystal Lowe	Crystal Lowe
Norman Dorman	Geoff Gustafson	Geoff Gustafson	Geoff Gustafson	Geoff Gustafson	Geoff Gustafson	Geoff Gustafson	Geoff Gustafson	Geoff Gustafson	Geoff Gustafson	Geoff Gustafson	Geoff Gustafson	Geoff Gustafson	Geoff Gustafson	Geoff Gustafson	Geoff Gustafson	Geoff Gustafson
Ramon Rodriquez		Zak Santiago		Zak Santiago		Zak Santiago		Zak Santiago		Zak Santiago	Zak Santiago	Zak Santiago	Zak Santiago	Zak Santiago	Zak Santiago	Zak Santiago
Serge		Chris Gauthier					Chris Gauthier									
Ardis Paine		Carol Burnett											Carol Burnett			
Joe O'Toole					Gregory Harrison			Gregory Harrison	Gregory Harrison	Gregory Harrison	Gregory Harrison		Gregory Harrison	Gregory Harrison	Gregory Harrison	Gregory Harrison
Hazel					Jill Morrison		Jill Morrison					Jill Morrison	Jill Morrison	Jill Morrison		
Steve Marek						Mark Valley				Mark Valley						
Dale Travers							Emilie Ullerup	Emilie Ullerup	Emilie Ullerup		Emilie Ullerup					
Gabe										Keb' Mo'			Keb' Mo'			
Bill Haywith											Barry Bostwick		Barry Bostwick			
Charley														Rhiannon Fish	Rhiannon Fish	Rhiannon Fish
