= Hailey Dean Mysteries =

Television film series

Hailey Dean Mysteries is an American/Canadian mystery film series that stars Kellie Martin as the titular character, Hailey Dean, a prosecutor working with the District Attorney's office who later quits her job to become a marriage counselor and therapist and is based on characters from Nancy Grace’s best-selling series of "Hailey Dean Mystery" novels. The series is set in Atlanta and aired on the Hallmark Movies & Mysteries channel between October 23, 2016 and May 19, 2019.

== Main cast ==
- Kellie Martin as Hailey Dean, a marriage counselor and therapist who used to work as a prosecutor in the District Attorney's office
- Viv Leacock as Fincher Garland, an investigator and a close friend of Hailey's who helps her in various ways during all her investigations

Hailey Dean Mysteries
- Genre: Mystery film
- Written by: Nancy Grace; Jonathan Greene; Michelle Ricci
- Directed by: Terry Ingram; Michael Robison; Allan Harmon
- Starring: Kellie Martin
- Original language: English
- No. of episodes: 9

Original release
- Network: Hallmark Movies & Mysteries
- Release: October 23, 2016 – May 19, 2019

- Giacomo Baessato as Detective Danny Morgan, a homicide detective and the younger brother of Will, Hailey's deceased fiance, who often lets her join in on his investigations.
- Lucia Walters as Detective Charlene Montgomery (Monty), a homicide detective who replaces Detective Morgan and also becomes friendly with Hailey
- Matthew MacCaull as Dr. Jonas McClellan, a newly appointed Medical Examiner who begins a relationship with Hailey
- Emily Holmes as Sabrina Butler, Hailey's friend and fellow therapist who runs the practice alongside Hailey

== Characters ==
- A dark grey cell indicates the character was not in the film.

Character	Title								
Character	Murder, with Love	Deadly Estate	Dating is Murder	2+2=Murder	A Marriage Made for Murder	A Will to Kill	Death on Duty	A Prescription for Murder	Killer Sentence
Hailey Dean	Kellie Martin	Kellie Martin	Kellie Martin	Kellie Martin	Kellie Martin	Kellie Martin	Kellie Martin	Kellie Martin	Kellie Martin
Fincher Garland	Viv Leacock	Viv Leacock	Viv Leacock	Viv Leacock	Viv Leacock	Viv Leacock	Viv Leacock	Viv Leacock	Viv Leacock
Detective Daniel 'Danny' Morgan	Giacomo Baesesato	Giacomo Baesesato	Giacomo Baesesato	Giacomo Baesesato	Giacomo Baesesato	Giacomo Baesesato			
Detective Charlene 'Monty' Montgomery	Lucia Walters	Lucia Walters	Lucia Walters	Lucia Walters	Lucia Walters	Lucia Walters	Lucia Walters	Lucia Walters	Lucia Walters
Dr. Jonas McClellan	Matthew MacCaull	Matthew MacCaull	Matthew MacCaull	Matthew MacCaull	Matthew MacCaull	Matthew MacCaull	Matthew MacCaull	Matthew MacCaull	Matthew MacCaull
Sabrina Butler		Emily Holmes	Emily Holmes	Emily Holmes	Emily Holmes	Emily Holmes		Emily Holmes	Emily Holmes

== Films ==
No.	Title	Directed by	Written by	Original release date
1	"Hailey Dean Mystery: Murder, with Love"	Terry Ingram	Nancy Grace, Jonathan Greene	October 23, 2016
Hailey, an ex DA's prosecutor in Atlanta, Georgia has switched to becoming a therapist. When one of her patients, Nurse Amanda Stone (Cindy Busby) is questioned about the sudden deaths of her parents, Hailey becomes involved in the investigation. Amanda reveals that her mother may have been disturbed about something and couldn't sleep. When millions of dollars disappear overnight from the family's personal and business accounts, the investigation takes a new turn. Hailey strikes up a conversation with a handsome stranger at a bar only to discover he is the new Medical Examiner, Dr. Jonas McClellan (Matthew MacCaull).
2	"Hailey Dean Mystery: Deadly Estate"	Terry Ingram	Nancy Grace, Jonathan Greene	April 9, 2017
Hailey convinces authorities to investigate when her friend Pam (Michelle Harrison) goes missing in the middle of selling her dead parents' big estate. Suspicion falls on an ex-boyfriend when Pam's new boyfriend and realtor Ryan (Jim Thorburn) is attacked. However, when Jonas is poisoned while working on the case, the police start looking for other suspects. Meanwhile, Hailey struggles with the return of her nightmares about Will's mugging and realizes that Will may not have been the target of the attack.
3	"Hailey Dean Mystery: Dating is Murder"	Michael Robison	Michelle Ricci	October 15, 2017
A friend of Hailey's mother recruits Hailey's help in locating her missing daughter Miranda, a young athletic woman. Hailey and Fincher start looking into the case and find out from Danny and Monty that there might be other women who have gone missing over the last 6 months from the same busy area in town. They discover the connection to a dating app called Penguin Match which Hailey's friend and fellow therapist Sabrina has been using as well. Getting little help from app owners Wade Braden (Toby Levins) and Jessica Marsand (Kieran Sequoia), Hailey decides to create a fake profile to match with the same people as Miranda and the other missing women to try and find out who might be using the app as a hunting ground.
4	"Hailey Dean Mysteries: 2+2=Murder"	Michael Robison	Story by : Jonathan Greene & Michael Robison; Teleplay by : Michael Robison	June 3, 2018
Hailey's niece tells her that her music teacher, the main force behind collecting funds for school repairs, wants to talk to her because of Hailey's past as a prosecutor. But the teacher soon goes missing leading Hailey to start an investigation into her disappearance.
5	"Hailey Dean Mysteries: A Marriage Made for Murder"	Michael Robison	Michelle Ricci	June 10, 2018
An art dealer has a heart-attack and the wife finds him dead at their art gallery but after cremation the ashes reveal arsenic. Hailey Dean gets involved in the mystery.
6	"Hailey Dean Mysteries: A Will to Kill"	Michael Robison	Michelle Ricci	June 17, 2018
Having found love again and feeling more stable in life, Hailey decides to reopen the murder case of her former fiance Will with help from her friend and Will's brother and cop Danny. They suspect that the killer may have wanted to kill Hailey instead of Will and start by looking into their past life from college when Will and Hailey had gotten engaged. As the investigation begins getting media attention from news anchor Nancy Grace, Hailey discovers that her college friend Emma has been missing all these years. Hailey takes help from another college friend Clyde (Chad Lowe) to track her down recalling that Emma had been working on a big story for the college newspaper. Hailey and Danny discover secrets from the past as they go looking for who may have wanted Emma gone and how she could be connected to Will's murder. Meanwhile, Fincher starts a relationship with Dr. Meghan.
7	"Hailey Dean Mysteries: Death on Duty"	Michael Robison	Michelle Ricci	May 5, 2019
Hailey Dean aids her friend, Fincher, in investigating the murder of his former Marine friend Kurt who had been acting strange in the days leading to his murder. As they dig deeper, they discover that Kurt had been distant from his wife Kayla (Rebecca Davis) who suspected him of having an affair and thus becomes a suspect. With a growing list of suspects who each seem to have strong motives, Hailey uses her investigative skills, as well as her uncanny ability to read people, to follow the clues that will lead them to the killer.
8	"Hailey Dean Mysteries: A Prescription for Murder"	Allan Harmon	Michelle Ricci	May 12, 2019
A string of murders at the Atlanta Memorial Hospital lead Hailey and Fincher to begin an investigation when Fincher's girlfriend, Meghan Philips, a doctor at the hospital is named a suspect. Hailey investigates and with Jonas' help discovers that someone with medical knowledge had been using a clever poison to make the death appear natural. Hailey must use all her skills to help Fincher clear his girlfriend's name.
9	"Hailey Dean Mysteries: Killer Sentence"	Michael Robison	Michelle Ricci	May 19, 2019
When a recently paroled convicted murderer, Clayton Morrel, is found murdered, suspicion falls on Hailey's friend and mentor, District Attorney Paulina D'Orazio (Lauren Holly). When evidence starts emerging incriminating Paulina further, Fincher and Hailey team up to help clear her name and find the real killer. It does not help their case that Paulina had been holding herself responsible for Clayton's early release and had been keeping an eye on him.

== Production and filming ==
The films were shot in British Columbia, Canada.
