= Kristin Booth =

Canadian actress (born 1974)

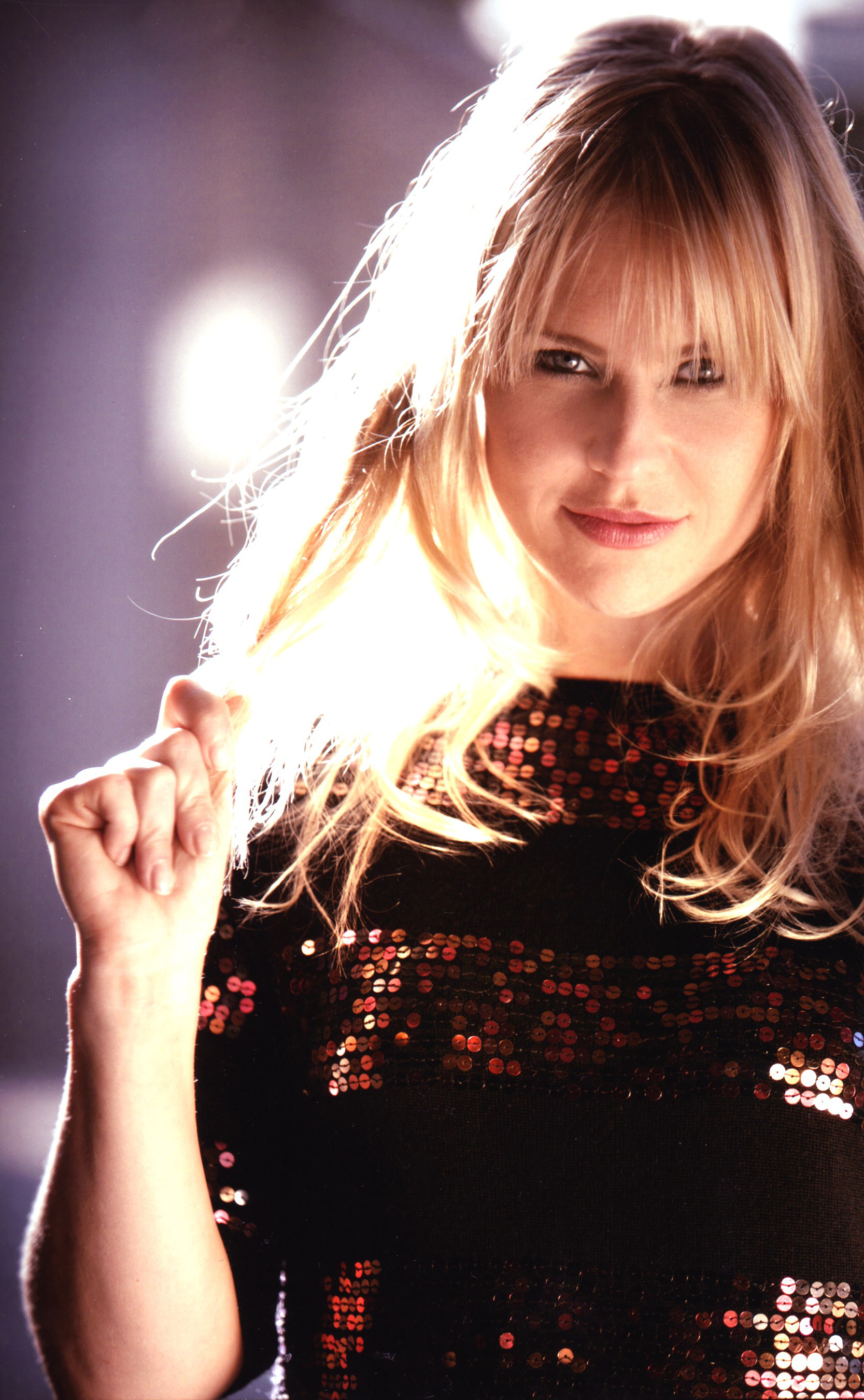
- Booth in 2008
- Born: August 28, 1974 (age 52); Kitchener, Ontario, Canada
- Education: Ryerson Polytechnic University
- Occupation: Actress
- Years active: 1997–present
- Spouse: Tim Ware (m. 2006)

Kristin Booth (born August 28, 1974) is a Canadian actress.

== Early life ==
Booth grew up in Kitchener, near the Shakespeare festival town of Stratford, Ontario. She made her professional acting debut when she was 12, playing an orphan in a summer stock production of Annie.

== Career ==
Booth's first starring role in a movie came with the 2003 heist film Foolproof opposite Ryan Reynolds. In 2008 she made a breakthrough with two performances, as a desperate crack whore in This Beautiful City and a comic turn as part of an ensemble cast of Young People Fucking, for which she was given the Genie Award for best supporting actress. Starting in 2014, she appears in the Hallmark original movie series Signed, Sealed, Delivered as Shane McInerney, a techie postal employee.

In 2018, Booth was one of four actresses who filed lawsuits against Albert Schulz, for sexual harassment allegations related to their time working with him at Soulpepper Theatre.

== Filmography ==
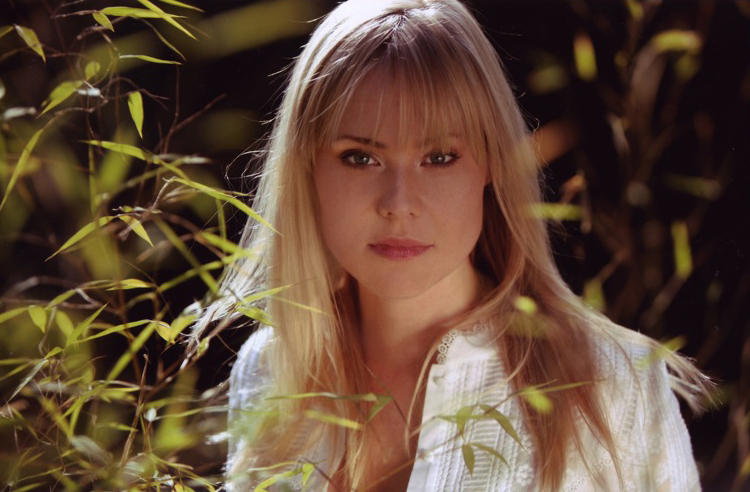
Booth in 2008

=== Film ===
| Year | Title | Role | Notes |
|---|---|---|---|
| 1998 | Ice | Jessica | TV movie |
| 1999 | Crime in Connecticut: The Story of Alex Kelly | Ashley Roberts | TV movie |
| 1999 | The Hunt for the Unicorn Killer | Buffy Maddux | TV movie |
| 1999 | Detroit Rock City | Cashier | |
| 1999 | The Promise | Jennifer Stoller | TV movie |
| 2000 | A Tale of Two Bunnies | Evie | TV movie |
| 2000 | Gossip | Diane | |
| 2000 | Blessed Stranger: After Flight 111 | Emma O'Rourke | TV movie |
| 2000 | Cruel Intentions 2 | Lauren | Video |
| 2001 | Jewel | Annie Hilburn (age 19) | TV movie |
| 2001 | A Mother's Fight for Justice | - | TV movie |
| 2001 | On the Line | Sam | |
| 2001 | Stolen Miracle | Motel Girl | TV movie |
| 2002 | Two Against Time | Kimberly | TV movie |
| 2002 | Salem Witch Trials | Lizzy Porter | TV movie |
| 2003 | Burn: The Robert Wraight Story | Marita Wraight | TV movie |
| 2003 | Foolproof | Sam | |
| 2004 | Sleep Murder | Dr. Macy Olsen | TV movie |
| 2006 | Kardia | Sally | |
| 2006 | Kaw | Cynthia | |
| 2007 | Young People Fucking | Abby | |
| 2007 | This Beautiful City | Pretty | |
| 2009 | Crackie | Gail | |
| 2009 | Defendor | Wendy Carter | |
| 2009 | At Home By Myself... with You | Romy | |
| 2010 | Harriet the Spy: Blog Wars | Golly | TV movie |
| 2010 | Love Letter from an Open Grave | Lisa | Short |
| 2010 | Sunday's at Tiffany's | Jaqueline | TV movie |
| 2010 | Bagged | Emma | Short |
| 2010 | American Wife | Amy | Short |
| 2011 | Three Mothers | Colleen Date | Short |
| 2011 | Dave vs Death | Mandy | Short |
| 2011 | Cloudburst | Molly | |
| 2011 | Below Zero | Penny/Paige | |
| 2013 | Sex After Kids | Bethany | |
| 2013 | Star Spangled Banners | Savannah | TV movie |
| 2013 | Signed, Sealed, Delivered | Shane McInerney | TV movie |
| 2013 | Holidaze | Angela | TV movie |
| 2014 | The Calling | Grace Batten | |
| 2014 | Big News from Grand Rock | Amanda | |
| 2014 | Signed, Sealed, Delivered for Christmas | Shane McInerney | TV movie |
| 2015 | Pirate's Passage | Mussy Oikle/Shirley (voice) | |
| 2015 | Signed, Sealed, Delivered: From Paris with Love | Shane McInerney | TV movie |
| 2015 | Signed, Sealed, Delivered: Truth Be Told | Shane McInerney | TV movie |
| 2015 | Signed, Sealed, Delivered: The Impossible Dream | Shane McInerney | TV movie |
| 2016 | Signed, Sealed, Delivered: From the Heart | Shane McInerney | TV movie |
| 2016 | Signed, Sealed, Delivered: One in a Million | Shane McInerney | TV movie |
| 2016 | Signed, Sealed, Delivered: Lost Without You | Shane McInerney | TV movie |
| 2017 | Signed, Sealed, Delivered: Higher Ground | Shane McInerney | TV movie |
| 2017 | Signed, Sealed, Delivered: Home Again | Shane McInerney | TV movie |
| 2018 | Signed, Sealed, Delivered: The Road Less Travelled | Shane McInerney | TV movie |
| 2018 | First Light | Sherri | |
| 2018 | Signed, Sealed, Delivered: To the Altar | Shane McInerney | TV movie |
| 2019 | Escaping the NXIVM Cult: A Mother's Fight to Save Her Daughter | Bonnie Vicente | TV movie |
| 2020 | The Lead | Jocelyn Ferguson | TV movie |
| 2020 | Once Upon a Pandemic | Mom | Short |
| 2020 | The Wrong Wedding Planner | Mandy | TV movie |
| 2020 | Marlene | Marlene Truscott | |
| 2021 | Signed, Sealed, Delivered: The Vows We Have Made | Shane McInerney | TV movie |
| 2024 | Shifting Gears | Teri | TV movie |
| 2024 | Signed, Sealed, Delivered: A Tale of Three Letters | Shane O'Toole | TV movie |
| 2024 | The Christmas Charade | Larissa Rush | TV movie |
| 2025 | Mystery Island: Winner Takes All | CC Cassandra Cornwall | TV movie |
| 2025 | Signed, Sealed, Delivered: To the Moon and Back | Shane O'Toole | TV movie |

=== Television ===
| Year | Title | Role | Notes |
|---|---|---|---|
| 1997 | Exhibit A: Secrets of Forensic Science | Leslie Wilco | Episode: "The Cheerleader Murder" |
| 1998 | Brimstone | Teacher | Episode: "Pilot" |
| 1998 | Traders | Lulu | Recurring Cast: Season 4 |
| 1999 | Total Recall 2070 | Ashley | Episode: "Brightness Falls" |
| 1999 | La Femme Nikita | Sondra | Episode: "Hand to Hand" |
| 2000 | Code Name: Eternity | Mandie | Episode: "24 Hours" |
| 2000–01 | Daring & Grace: Teen Detectives | Tracy Grace | Main Cast |
| 2001 | Nero Wolfe | Dini Lauer | Episode: "Door to Death" |
| 2001 | Paradise Falls | Trudy Sinclair | Recurring Cast: Season 1 |
| 2002–05 | Braceface | Evie (voice) | Guest Cast: Season 2–3 |
| 2004 | Puppets Who Kill | Charlie | Episode: "Prostitutes for Jesus" |
| 2004 | This Is Wonderland | Ms. Brice | Episode: "1.10" |
| 2004 | Missing | Paula Galen | Episode: "Truth or Dare: Part 1 & 2" |
| 2004–05 | ReGenesis | Daisy Markovic | Recurring Cast: Season 1 |
| 2005 | The Newsroom | Nora | Recurring Cast: Season 3 |
| 2005 | Show Me Yours | Olivia | Recurring Cast: Season 2 |
| 2006 | Prairie Giant | Irma Douglas | Episode: "Part 1 & 2" |
| 2007 | The Company | Adelle Sweet Kristsky | Main Cast |
| 2008 | Supernatural | Renee Van Allen | Episode: "Malleus Malefircarum" |
| 2008 | MVP | Connie | Main Cast |
| 2009 | Flashpoint | Sarah Scott | Episode: "Backwards Day" |
| 2009 | The Listener | Lindsay Wallace | Episode: "Beginning to See the Light" |
| 2009 | The Border | Louise Tilden | Episode: "The Dead" & "Broken" |
| 2009–11 | Producing Parker | Parker Kovak | Main Cast |
| 2010 | Rookie Blue | Melanie | Episode: "Fite Nite" |
| 2011 | Republic of Doyle | Toni Burke | Episode: "Sympathy for the Devil" |
| 2011 | The Kennedys | Ethel Kennedy | Main Cast |
| 2011 | Haven | Nikki Coleman | Episode: "Lockdown" |
| 2013 | Saving Hope | Genna Rayman | Episode: "Vamonos" |
| 2014 | Signed, Sealed, Delivered | Shane McInerney | Main Cast |
| 2014–15 | Orphan Black | Bonnie Johanssen | Recurring Cast: Season 2–3 |
| 2017 | The Kennedys: After Camelot | Ethel Kennedy | Main Cast |
| 2017 | 12 Monkeys | Dr. Railly | Episode: "Nuture" |
| 2019 | Hudson & Rex | Tracey Thomas | Recurring Cast: Season 1 |
| 2021 | Private Eyes | Pam Bridgeland | Episode: "Blueprint for Murder" |
| 2021 | The Hot Zone | Nancy Haigwood | Recurring Cast: Season 2 |
| 2021–22 | Workin' Moms | Cheryl Brewer | Recurring Cast: Season 5–6 |
| 2022 | The Boys | Tessa TNT | Recurring Cast: Season 3 |
| 2023 | Murdoch Mysteries | Scarlet Marshall | Episode: "Cool Million" |

== Awards ==
Awards and Nominations
| Year | Awards | Group | Film | Result | Refs |
|---|---|---|---|---|---|
| 2005 | Gemini Award | Best Supporting Actress in a Guest Role | ReGenesis | Won | |
| 2008 | Genie Award | Best Performance by an Actress in a Supporting Role | Young People Fucking | Won | |
| 2008 | Canadian Comedy Award | Film Performance, Female | Young People Fucking | Nominated | |
| 2009 | Gemini Award | Best Actress in a Guest Role | Flashpoint | Nominated | |
| 2010 | Canadian Comedy Award | Film Performance, Female | At Home by Myself...With You | Won | |
