= Michael Robison =

Canadian film and tv director

- Born: August 29, 1955 (age 69); Toronto, Ontario, Canada
- Occupation: Director
- Years active: 1988-present

Michael Robison (born August 29, 1955) is a Canadian film and television director. Since the late 1980s, he has amassed a number of directorial credits namely 21 Jump Street, Tropical Heat, Poltergeist: The Legacy (also producer), The Outer Limits, First Wave, Earth: Final Conflict, Mysterious Ways, Jeremiah, Andromeda, The Dead Zone, Kyle XY, Eureka, Project Mc2 (Netflix Original Series) and other series.

He also directed the film Deadly Sins (1995) starring David Keith and Alyssa Milano. And Exploding Sun (2012).

Robison was born in Toronto, Ontario.
