= Paul Greene (actor) =

Canadian actor (born 1974)

- Born: June 2, 1974 (age 52); Wetaskiwin, Alberta, Canada
- Occupations: Actor; model; photographer; singer
- Years active: 2006–present
- Spouse: Angi Fletcher (m. 1996; div. 2012)
- Partner(s): Kate Austin (2019–present, engaged)
- Children: 2
- Website: www.paulgreene.com

Paul Greene (born June 2, 1974 in Wetaskiwin, Alberta) is a Canadian actor.

== Career ==
Greene's first notable role was in the MyNetworkTV telenovela Wicked Wicked Games, where he was a series regular appearing in 40 episodes (out of 65) as attorney Benjamin Gray. Greene's other acting credits include guest roles in Freddie, Shark, The Wedding Bells, My Own Worst Enemy, and NCIS. His major-picture debut was in Sofia Coppola's 2010 film Somewhere. He also has appeared in over 100 television commercials. Greene has starred in several Hallmark movies. He was a regular on Hallmark’s When Calls the Heart, playing the town doctor in Hope Valley for five seasons.

== Personal life ==
Greene lives in Los Angeles with his son Oliver, who he co-parents with his ex-wife, Angi Greene. He is engaged to Kate Austin, to whom he proposed in May 2019 in Italy. He and Austin have a son they named Austin. Austin Greene was born on December 12, 2021. Paul Greene loves playing beach volleyball with Ollie and watching the sunset; he also loves playing the guitar and singing (he writes his own songs). His mother is from the Netherlands; she was a nurse and has played in some of Greene's movies as an extra. His father died of ALS (amyotrophic lateral sclerosis, also known as motor neurone disease or Lou Gehrig's disease) in 2014.

== Filmography ==
=== Films ===
Year	Title	Role	Notes
2010	Somewhere	Ron the Masseur	
2010	Red Rooster	—N/a	Short film
2013	Screwed	Steve	
2014	Beautiful Girl	Peter the Punisher	
2015	Deadly Sanctuary	Eric Heisler	
2017	Sweet Home Carolina	Luke	
2018	Buttons	—N/a	
2019	Stay with Me	Tristan Summers	
2015	Christmas Detour	Dylan	

=== Television ===
Year	Title	Role	Notes
2006	Freddie	Dwight	Episode: "Eligible Bachelor"
2006	Shark	Scott Ransom	Episode: "LAPD Blue"
2006–2007	Wicked Wicked Games	Benjamin Gray	Main cast
2007	The Wedding Bells	Robert Harris	Episode: "Partly Cloudy, with a Chance of Disaster"
2008	My Own Worst Enemy	Rick	Episode: "That Is Not My Son"
2009	NCIS	Renny Grant	Episode: "Bounce"
2009	Eastwick	Guy	Episode: "Paint and Pleasure"
2010	The Whole Truth	Kevin	Episode: "Pilot"
2011	Harry's Law	Thomas	2 episodes
2012	Do No Harm	Ian Brock	TV movie
2013	NTSF:SD:SUV::	Franz	Episode: "The Real Bicycle Thief"
2013	The Client List	Walter	Episode: "Who's Cheatin' Who"
2013	The Newsroom	Scott	Episode: "News Night with Will McAvoy"
2014	Bitten	Philip McAdams	Main cast (Season 1)
2015	Girlfriends' Guide to Divorce	Vika	2 episodes
2015	Perfect Match	Adam Parker	TV movie
2015	A Christmas Detour	Dylan	TV movie
2016	Anything for Love	Jack Cooper RN	TV movie
2016	A Wish for Christmas	Peter Williams	TV movie
2017–2021	When Calls the Heart	Dr. Carson Shepard	Main cast (Season 4–8)
2017	Campfire Kiss	Steve	TV movie
2017	My Favorite Wedding	Michael	TV movie
2017	Christmas in Angel Falls	Jack Avery	TV movie
2019	Christmas in Evergreen: Tidings of Joy	Ben Baxter	TV movie
2021	Christmas CEO	Joe Sullivan	TV movie
2022	I'm Glad It's Christmas	Jason Murphy	TV movie
2022	Fit for Christmas	Griffin Weston	TV movie
2023	Topanga	Dave	TV movie
2025	Love in the Clouds	Jared Troy	TV movie
