= Scott Smith (director) =

Canadian television and film director

- Occupations: Television and film director
- Years active: 1999–present
- Known for: Rollercoaster (1999), Falling Angels (2003), As Slow as Possible (2008)

Scott Smith is a Canadian television and film director. He has won multiple film festival awards for his 1999 film Rollercoaster. He also directed the 2003 film Falling Angels, based on the Barbara Gowdy novel, which achieved a nomination from the Directors Guild of Canada for Outstanding Achievement in Direction – Feature Film.

In 2008, he directed and photographed the feature documentary, As Slow as Possible, which follows blind author Ryan Knighton on a pilgrimage to Germany to hear a single note change in the notorious 639 year-long performance of the John Cage composition Organ²/ASLSP (As Slow As Possible).

Since then, he has directed the pilots for Carter, Call Me Fitz, the MTV remake of UK Skins and was the producing director in Season One of the Syfy hit The Magicians. Other credits include the This is Wonderland and The Chris Isaak Show.

He continues to split his time between Vancouver and Hornby Island, B.C. where he is the artistic director of the Hornby Island Film Festival.
