= Homestead (Star Trek: Voyager) =

- Star Trek: Voyager episode
- Episode no.: Season 7 Episode 23
- Directed by: LeVar Burton
- Written by: Raf Green
- Production code: 269
- Original air date: May 9, 2001

Guest appearances
- Julianne Christie - Dexa; Ian Meltzer - Brax; Rob LaBelle - Oxilon; Scarlett Pomers - Naomi Wildman; Christian R. Conrad - Miner; John Kenton Shull - Commander Nocona

Episode chronology
← Previous "Natural Law"	Next → "Renaissance Man"
- Star Trek: Voyager season 7

"Homestead" is the 169th episode of Star Trek: Voyager and the 23rd episode of the seventh season. One of the final episodes of the series, it marks the departure of Neelix from the crew of the Starship Voyager.

The episode was directed by LeVar Burton and aired 9 May 2001 on UPN.

== Director ==
This episode was directed by LeVar Burton, who directed several other episodes in this television series. Burton played Geordi La Forge, first appearing in the series Star Trek: The Next Generation and reprising that role in the episode "Timeless", which he also directed. Overall Burton would direct eight episodes of this series.

== Plot ==
Voyager is holding a party to celebrate "First Contact Day", the day Earth was first openly contacted by an alien civilization (the Vulcans). Included in the celebration is an ancient jukebox playing the favorite music of warp drive pioneer Zefram Cochrane along with his favorite food (cheese pierogi). It has been 315 years since then, thus making this day April 5, 2378.

During the party, the crew of Voyager is surprised to detect a Talaxian settlement hidden within an asteroid belt which is thousands of light-years away from the nearest Talaxian territory.

A curious Neelix travels toward the Talaxians' asteroid along with Paris and Tuvok aboard the Delta Flyer, but they are shot down and crash before they can make contact. A company of miners claims the asteroid belt, and they are hostile toward any intruders into their territory.

The Talaxians rescue the Voyager crew, and Dexa, a widowed mother, takes a liking to Neelix. The feeling becomes mutual as the two get to know each other. He learns that Dexa's people emigrated to the asteroid and constructed a small city by dismantling all but one of the very spacecraft that brought them there. The miners have been pressuring the Talaxians to leave the asteroid which they would like to take for its minerals.

Having been repeatedly driven from one planet to another, the Talaxians would prefer to stay and make the asteroid their permanent home but have no way to defend themselves against the miners' cooperative and no means for leaving if they wanted to. Neelix asks Tuvok to help the Talaxians but Tuvok declines because of the Federation's Prime Directive of noninterference; however, Tuvok remarks that Neelix could help the Talaxians himself as he is the most resourceful person Tuvok knows of. Neelix being the resourceful person he is, begins to devise a plan for the colony to defend themselves. Using the miners' existing shield technology, they plan to erect a defensive shield around the asteroid. They must act quickly as not to arouse suspicion. Neelix coordinates the shield placements by using his old shuttle which Voyager has had docked away. Neelix deflects bomb attacks from the miners, loses weapon control and attempts to ram the last mine. The Delta Flyer springs to aid Neelix and helps destroy the bomb using the loophole of aiding a friend in distress rather than the Talaxians. Together they fend off the miners' attacks.

After the miners retreat, Neelix returns to Voyager. He is distressed that he must leave Dexa and her son, Brax, and his fellow Talaxians on the asteroid. After a bit of soul-searching, he decides that Voyager will be all right without him, and he joins the Talaxians on the asteroid. Voyager continues toward home, and Captain Janeway bestows on Neelix the title of Official Starfleet Ambassador to the Delta Quadrant.

The crew honor Neelix with a ceremony to mark his departure. The crew lines up in the corridors from the turbo lift to the shuttle bay. Tuvok surprises Neelix by doing a small dance step, something the Talaxian had unsuccessfully tried to convince him to do earlier. Neelix, touched by the final gesture, leaves Voyager.

== Reception ==
In 2015, SyFy ranked the departure of Neelix in this episode as one of the top ten best moments of Star Trek: Voyager. They note how this marked the "beginning of the end" of the show's run.
