= Benedetta Valanzano =

Italian actress

- Born: Benedetta Valanzano; 5 May 1985 (age 40); Naples, Italy
- Occupation: Actress
- Years active: 2000–present

Benedetta Valanzano (born 5 May 1985) is an Italian actress. She became famous in 2000 after appearing in a beauty pageant. Since then she has acted in several movies and television series in Italy.

== Filmography ==
=== Cinema ===
- Vita Smeralda, directed by Jerry Calà (2006)
- Los Borgia, directed by Antonio Hernández (2006)

=== Television ===
- La stagione dei delitti, Rai Due (2004)
- Ho sposato un calciatore, Canale 5 (2005)
- Elisa di Rivombrosa 2, Canale 5 (2005)
- Un posto al sole, Rai Tre (2006/2007/2008/2009)
- Assunta Spina, Rai Uno (2006)
- Il generale dalla chiesa, Canale 5 (2007)
- Capri 2, Rai Uno (2008)
- Vita da paparazzo, Canale 5 (2008)
- La nuova squadra, Rai Tre (2008)
- Mal'aria, Rai Uno (2009)
- Piper, Canale 5 (2009)
- Non smettere di sognare, Canale 5 (2009)
