= Bill Vallely =

Illustrator

- Born: September 24, 1952 (age 72)
- Occupation: Comic book/television writer

Bill Vallely (born September 24, 1952) is a professional illustrator and writer that has spent 20 years working mostly as a freelance artist. He has worked in various media, including comics, animation, documentaries, textbooks and script writing.

He has written and drawn for many comic books, including for Marvel Comics, DC Comics, Valiant Comics, Omni Comix, Archie Comics, Harvey Comics, Hanna Barbera, and Nintendo Comics System. He has illustrated children's books for Laredo Press and worked on several animated children’s television programs, including Chip 'n Dale Rescue Rangers, The Smurfs, Bad Dog, and Tricksters.

He wrote and created medical illustrations for documentaries on Lifetime Television, wrote science textbooks for children with Inkwell Press, and designed sets for National Touring Companies of Lincoln Center. He was also responsible for co-writing the script of the episode "Tinker, Tenor, Doctor, Spy" of Star Trek: Voyager. He additionally worked on some episodes of Brotherly Love and My Wife and Kids with his brother Jim Vallely.
