= Medici miei =

- Genre: Sitcom
- Created by: Fatma Ruffini
- Starring: Enzo Iacchetti; Giobbe Covatta; Alessandro Sampaoli; Federica Bonani; Giacomo Valenti; Elisabetta Canalis; Antonio Cupo; Eleonora Pedron; Gianluca Impastato; Bed Cerchiai
- Country of origin: Italy
- No. of seasons: 1
- No. of episodes: 11

Production
- Running time: 20 minutes

Original release
- Network: Italia 1
- Release: September 2 – December 5, 2008

Medici miei is an Italian sitcom.

== See also ==
- List of Italian television series
