= Natural Law (Star Trek: Voyager) =

- Star Trek: Voyager episode
- Episode no.: Season 7 Episode 22
- Directed by: Terry Windell
- Story by: James Kahn; Kenneth Biller
- Teleplay by: James Kahn
- Production code: 268
- Original air date: May 2, 2001

Guest appearances
- Paul Sandman – Ventu Healer; Autumn Reeser – Ventu Girl; Robert Curtis-Brown – Ambassador; Neil Vipond – Flight Instructor Kleg; Ivar Brogger – Barus; Matt McKenzie – Port Authority Officer; Brooke Benko – Transporter N.D.; Tim McGrath – Ventu

Episode chronology
← Previous "Friendship One"	Next → "Homestead"
- Star Trek: Voyager season 7

"Natural Law" is the 168th episode of Star Trek: Voyager, the 22nd episode of the seventh season.

While visiting the planet Ledos, Seven and Chakotay crash through an energy barrier. The two are stranded in the jungle with pre-warp humanoids, who take the pair in and care for Chakotay's injuries. To rejoin Voyager, he and Seven have to disable the energy barrier.

== Plot ==
While traveling in a shuttle to the planet Ledos for a conference on Warp Field Dynamics, Chakotay and Seven of Nine take a small scenic detour to admire the natural landscape. There they find themselves unintentionally scraping an ancient energy barrier that begins to break the shuttle apart. Seven manages to blast a temporary hole in the barrier. The shuttle falls through but still threatens to break apart. Moments before it explodes, the two beam to the surface, Chakotay's leg being hurt in the process.

They find themselves in a lush jungle. In spite of Chakotay's leg injury, they decide to search for the shuttle's debris in hopes of constructing a distress beacon. While searching, they encounter a tribe of primitive humanoids (the Ventu) living in the jungle. Because of the Prime Directive, Chakotay and Seven agree to limit their contact with them as much as possible.

While in contact with the Ledos authorities, Paris performs an illegal flying maneuver within Ledos space. Despite his years of training as a pilot, the Ledos authorities insist he undergo one-on-one flight training to teach him how to fly safely. Janeway agrees to this, partly as a way to maintain good relations, but Paris is chagrined at a long and painstaking course under a Ledosian 'remedial instructor'.

Seven is forced to proceed alone as Chakotay is too injured to continue. As Chakotay rests from his injury, he is found by three Ventu and taken to their camp, where they begin healing his injuries. He begins to communicate with them using their sign language, and becomes impressed with their hospitality and culture. Out of necessity, Seven must affect their culture also, in order to watch out for Chakotay. The primitives come to emulate the two, even copying Chakotay's facial tattoos. One copies Seven's implants with debris taken from the shuttle.

When Seven heads off alone to look for the shuttle debris, she becomes lost after dropping her tricorder down a deep hole. But a young Ventu woman has followed her, and the next day helps her find the crashed main body of the shuttle. Chakotay catches up to them and reluctantly recruits some Ventu to help carry a deflector array to a more optimum site.

Chakotay and Seven eventually disable the ancient energy barrier using the deflector. Voyager learns the barrier was erected by an alien species in order to protect the Ventu from the Ledosians, who had been at war with the Ventu in the past. These aliens were eventually assimilated by the Borg (which is why Seven had the knowledge needed to penetrate the field during the crash). The shield going down opens up the habitat and its primitive inhabitants to the Ledosians, who quickly send an expedition to research and exploit the Ventu habitat. The Ledos authorities promise Janeway that the Ventu would be well-treated, but the crew are unconvinced. But when they try to remove the shuttle deflector to close the barrier again, they are attacked by a craft from Ledos that disables Voyager's transporters. Paris, despite the protests of his flight instructor, uses dramatic and skillful piloting to remove the Ledosian team and reestablish the barrier, freeing the Ventu at least temporarily from cultural contamination by the outside world. Seven is apprehensive that the Ledosians scanned her deflector modifications and may eventually construct their own device to disable the barrier.

== Production ==
The episode served to set up the development of a relationship between Chakotay and Seven of Nine. This development was hinted at in the episode "Human Error" which was shot just before it, and would feature significantly in the series finale "Endgame", which would air three weeks later.

== Reception ==
SyFy recommend this episode for their Seven of Nine binge-watching guide.
