= Midnight Masquerade =

- Genre: Romantic Comedy
- Written by: Patricia Resnick
- Directed by: Graeme Campbell
- Starring: Autumn Reeser; Christopher Russell; Richard Burgi
- Countries of origin: United States; Canada
- Original language: English

Production
- Running time: 90 minutes
- Production company: Domino Productions

Original release
- Network: Hallmark Channel
- Release: October 26, 2014

Midnight Masquerade is a 2014 American/Canadian romantic comedy. It was directed by Graeme Campbell and starred Autumn Reeser and Christopher Russell, premiering on Hallmark Channel on October 26, 2014.

== Plot ==
In this modern-day reverse Cinderella story, a young and naive lawyer, exploited by his boss, gets his life turned around after meeting the beautiful Elyse Samford, CEO of a candy company. Their first date takes place at the annual Halloween masquerade ball.

== Cast ==
- Autumn Reeser as Elyse Samford
- Christopher Russell as Rob Carelli
- Richard Burgi as Howard Samford
- Helen Colliander as Ruby
- Damon Runyan as Emmett Higgins
- Neil Crone as Sam
- Danny Smith as Andrew Higgins
