= Patrick Loubatière =

French journalist, director and teacher

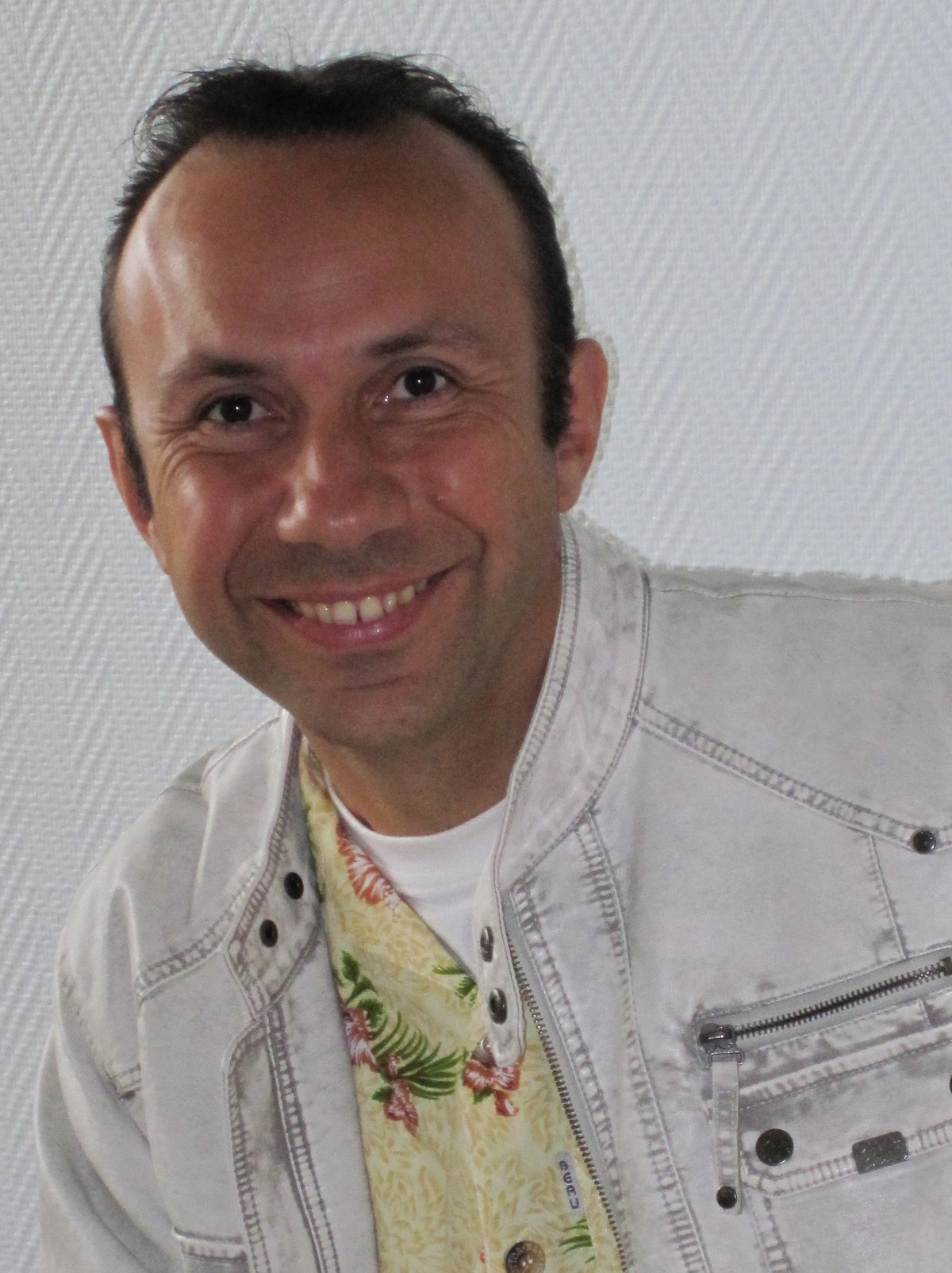
Patrick Loubatière in 2009.

Patrick Loubatière is a French author and journalist, stage director and actor, independent publisher and literature teacher. He is also a chess coach, and a former national champion. His students have been French chess champions 18 times and European champions in school categories twice.

== Career ==
=== Stage ===
He wrote and directed three French stage shows for Alison Arngrim: Confessions d’une Garce de la Prairie (2006+), La malle aux trésors de Nellie Oleson (2012+) and Nellie Oleson enflamme les années 80 (2023+). These comedic, interactive shows are based on the cult series Little House on the Prairie, where Alison Arngrim played the role of Nellie Oleson. The three shows got rave reviews in the French media.

Patrick Loubatière joins Arngrim on the stage as a comedy duo., on each of these three shows.

=== Journalist ===
He is also a prolific television and music journalist. Writer for the Belgian weekly Télépro and for several French magazines, he has published interviews with most of the actors on the series Lost, NCIS, The Mentalist, Desperate Housewives, Criminal Minds, Revenge, CSI: Crime Scene Investigation, etc.

He has also interviewed such TV legends as Larry Hagman, Robert Conrad, Lee Majors, David McCallum, Stefanie Powers, Paul Michael Glaser, Patrick Duffy, Barbara Bain, etc.

Loubatière's book Little House on the Prairie from A to Z accompanies the complete series on DVD. He also interviewed the actors on the bonus segments, plus created the trivia quizzes.

=== Author and Independent Publisher ===
Since 2011, he has written and published in France a tribute series of books called Forever. Each number is an exhaustive review of an artist's life and career, including exclusive interviews with persons close to the subject, and exclusive pictures. Among the artists honored in these are Michael Landon, Autumn Reeser, Antonio Fargas, Katherine MacGregor, Emmy-winning actress Barbara Anderson, German pop star Sandra, silent film star Eddie Quillan, Obie Award-winning actor Moses Gunn, etc. These are often artists who marked his childhood. A French review wrote in 2020: "Patrick Loubatière's books are renowned for their great clarity, their exhaustive approach and their attractive presentation".

Only five of them were published in English: Prairie Memories, Autumn Reeser - No Ordinary Girl., and tributes to the actors Michael Landon, Victor French and Richard Lynch.

During the COVID-19 pandemic, he wrote and published 7 books in a year and a half. An article presented him as “very probably the most prolific French author during this period of health crisis”. British-born American actress Veronica Cartwright (The Birds, Alien...) wrote the foreword of his book Les actrices d'Alfred Hitchcock.

In 2025 and 2026, he wrote and published books devoted to actors such as Shannen Doherty (Beverly Hills, 90210), Dabbs Greer (The Green Mile), Édouard Delmont (a frequent collaborator of Marcel Pagnol and Fernandel), David Soul (Starsky & Hutch), and Lydie Denier (Jane in the television series Tarzán).

=== Chess ===
Loubatière teaches Chess in high school and established this program as a degree option. In 2023, 180 students were registered in the Chess section of his high school.

A former national Chess champion himself at age 14, he no longer competes but has coached his teams to victory in over 20 French and European title competitions.

=== Teacher ===
Patrick Loubatière teaches French literature at a Montpellier high school, in the south of France.

He is an activist promoting youth health programs, including anti-smoking and child abuse campaigns. His investment earned him a Distinguished Merit French Award in 2022, Ordre national du Mérite.

He also organized conferences between hundreds of high school students, French authors and comedians: Jean d'Ormesson, Patrick Bruel (500 students, on the theme Poetry and Song), Íngrid Betancourt, Amélie Nothomb, Bernard Werber, Marc Levy, Patrick Fiori for the charity Restaurants du Cœur, and so on.

During the COVID-19 pandemic, in order to combat the risk of demotivation among students while maintaining a sense of community during the lockdowns, he launched the Stars & Lycéens project: a book created by his students, showcasing both the perspective of adolescents on the crisis (Covid-19 from A-Z) and that of adults. He organized interviews between his students and American actors like Mark Harmon and Jane Fonda, as well as many distinguished French personalities, including Sophie Marceau, Pierre Richard, France's favorite personality Jean-Jacques Goldman (his first interview in many years), Francis Cabrel, Julien Clerc, etc. The book was published to benefit the French Red Cross and quickly raised €8,876 for the humanitarian aid organization.

== Award ==
2022 : Prix de l'Éducation Citoyenne, Ordre national du Mérite.
