= Vita Smeralda =

- Directed by: Jerry Calà
- Written by: Jerry Calà; Gino Capone
- Produced by: Claudio Saraceni
- Starring: Jerry Calà; Benedetta Valanzano; Eleonora Pedron; Francesca Cavallin; Fabio Fulco; Guido Nicheli
- Cinematography: Marco Pieroni
- Edited by: Patrizio Marone
- Music by: Angelo Talocci
- Distributed by: Medusa Film
- Release date: 14 July 2006
- Running time: 93 minutes
- Country: Italy
- Language: Italian

Vita Smeralda (lit. 'Emerald life', as a pun on Costa Smeralda) is a 2006 Italian comedy film directed by Jerry Calà.

== Cast ==
- Jerry Calà as himself
- Benedetta Valanzano as Elena
- Eleonora Pedron as Silvia
- Francesca Cavallin as Luana
- Fabio Fulco as Ascanio
- Guido Nicheli as the Captain
- Davide Silvestri as Manolo
- Elena Santarelli as Marika
- Umberto Smaila as himself
- Lory Del Santo as herself
- Ana Laura Ribas as herself
- DJ Ringo as himself
- Costantino Vitagliano as himself
- Daniele Interrante as himself
- Demo Morselli as himself
- Flavio Briatore as himself
- Lele Mora as himself
- Amedeo Goria as himself
