= A Country Wedding =

- Written by: Nancey Silvers
- Directed by: Anne Wheeler
- Starring: Jesse Metcalfe; Autumn Reeser; Lauren Holly
- Music by: Terry Frewer
- Countries of origin: United States; Canada
- Original language: English

Production
- Executive producers: Michael Ogiens; Nancey Silvers
- Producer: Harvey Kahn
- Cinematography: Adam Sliwinski
- Editor: Richard Schwadel
- Running time: 90 minutes
- Production company: Country Road Productions

Original release
- Network: Hallmark Channel
- Release: June 27, 2015

A Country Wedding is a 2015 American-Canadian made-for-television romantic drama film directed by Anne Wheeler and starring Jesse Metcalfe, Autumn Reeser, and Lauren Holly. It premiered on Hallmark Channel on June 27, 2015.

== Plot ==
A few weeks before his very glamorous wedding to a famous actress, a country music singer returns to the small town in Texas where he grew up to sell his family's old house. There, he meets his childhood friend, Sarah, a cowgirl who owns a small ranch. With her, he rediscovers the joy of the simple things in life that he had forgotten.

== Cast ==
- Jesse Metcalfe as Bradley Suttons
- Autumn Reeser as Sarah Standor
- Laura Mennell as Catherine
- Lauren Holly as Margaret
- Aaron Craven as Adam
- Hrothgar Mathews as James
