= Hollywood Flies =

- US DVD cover
- Directed by: Fabio Segatori
- Screenplay by: Alessandro Fabbri; Aldo Lado; Chiara Laudani; Roberto Scarpetti; Luigi (Gino) Ventriglia; Fabio Segatori
- Based on: Mosche a Hollywood by Alessandro Fabbri
- Produced by: Arnon Milchan; Steven Reuther
- Starring: Antonio Cupo; Bianca Guaccero; Brad Renfro; Vinnie Jones
- Cinematography: Curtis Petersen
- Edited by: Cosmo Fletcher, Nick Rotundo
- Production companies: GFT Entertainment; Peace Arch Entertainment
- Distributed by: Monarch Home Video
- Release date: November 25, 2005
- Running time: 95 minutes
- Countries: Italy, Canada
- Languages: English, Italian, French
- Box office: $39,768

Hollywood Flies is 2005 film directed by Fabio Segatori, based on the novel Mosche a Hollywood. Blending elements of the road movie, crime thriller, and noir, the film follows siblings Luca (Antonio Cupo) and Martina (Bianca Guaccero) as they travel to Los Angeles, only to become entangled in a dangerous criminal plot involving casino robbers, ransom demands, and shifting alliances. The cast also includes Brad Renfro, Vinnie Jones, Caprice Bourret, and Casper Van Dien. Set largely against stark desert landscapes, Hollywood Flies combines stylised visuals with intersecting storylines.

== Plot ==
Italian siblings Luca (Antonio Cupo) and Martina (Bianca Guaccero) travel from Las Vegas to Los Angeles, but their road trip derails when they become involved with criminals in remote desert areas. The situation escalates after casino robbers Sean (Vinnie Jones) and Jamie (Brad Renfro) kidnap Martina, forcing Luca to find the ransom money. The story follows a chain of pursuits, betrayals, and confrontations involving various figures from the criminal underworld, turning the trip into a sequence of violent events.

== Cast ==
- Antonio Cupo as Luca
- Bianca Guaccero as Martina
- Brad Renfro as Jamie
- Vinnie Jones as Sean
- Caprice Bourret as Cherie
- Casper Van Dien as Zach
- Ian Alden as Mickey
- Conrad Coates as Ray

== Background and production ==
Filming for Hollywood Flies began on August 5, 2003, and wrapped up in mid-September as an international co-production involving Italy, Canada, and the United Kingdom. The film was shot largely in Saskatchewan, particularly in the Moose Jaw and Regina areas, with a predominantly Canadian crew drawn from Saskatchewan and other provinces. Parts of southern Saskatchewan, including the Big Muddy area and industrial sites such as the Belle Plaine potash mine tailings dump, were used to stand in for desert landscapes resembling Death Valley.

Directed by Italian filmmaker Fabio Segatori and based on the Italian novel, Mosche a Hollywood (literally translated as Hollywood Flies, a term referring to underworld hangers-on), the production brought together creative and financial resources from the three countries, a collaboration described by Saskatchewan producer Stephen Onda as beneficial both for financing the project and increasing its appeal across multiple markets. Despite the multinational nature of the production and the presence of multiple languages on set, Onda noted that no creative conflicts disrupted the shooting schedule.

The cast reflects the film's international scope. Canadian actor Antonio Cupo and Italian actress Bianca Guaccero star as siblings at the center of the story, while English actor and former footballer Vinnie Jones appears as an ex-convict. They are joined by supermodel-turned-actressl Caprice Bourret, cast as a small-town Louisiana girl, alongside American actors Brad Renfro and Casper Van Dien. Bourret made her big-screen debut in the film, appearing as a gangster's moll. In an interview, she referred to Hollywood Flies as part of a two-film Hollywood deal, and added that audiences should not expect explicit scenes, explaining, "There's no chance I'm going to do naked love scenes… I won't be doing anything gratuitous".

== Release ==
In a press release, Peace Arch Entertainment Group announced that Hollywood Flies would be presented to international distributors at the Cannes Film Festival beginning on May 11, 2005. The film was released on home video by Monarch in 2005, with preorders beginning on June 30 and an official street date of July 26, when it became available on DVD and VHS rental.

== Critical reception ==
In his review for Eyes for Film, Shaun Davis characterizes Hollywood Flies as "an odd mix". He finds the narrative increasingly unfocused, undermined by performances that "fail to convince", particularly the "oddly chosen femme fatale". Davis is also critical of Fabio Segatori's visual approach, observing that "following the camera's not so subtle glide(s) across the desert soon becomes a chore", and that the director's "overly stylised direction seems out of place" within the story. Although he concedes that the film is "beautifully shot" in places and that Segatori shows "plenty to offer", Davis ultimately concludes that, despite drifting between subplots without collapsing into confusion, Hollywood Flies remains "somewhat of an empty vessel". He awarded the film three out of five stars. The Sun-Herald described Hollywood Flies as a "patchily plotted road film", noting that "double-crossing is the game" and highlighting the presence of Brad Renfro and Vinnie Jones. They awarded the film two out of five stars. AllMovie rated it one and a half stars out of five.

In her review for The Daily Mirror, Jessica Mellor stated that Vinnie Jones "has all the subtlety of a sledgehammer", describing his portrayal of Sean, who with Jamie (Brad Renfro) robs a Las Vegas casino. She characterized the film as "badly edited" and "awfully shot", with what she called "excruciating acting", and remarked that this, in her view, explained why the film "went straight to DVD". Davros of Eyes for Film, commented on the film's home-release presentation, noting that "the picture and sound quality is excellent, considering this was made for television", but criticized the release for its "lack of extras", suggesting that "perhaps no one bothered to contact the director for an interview", which ultimately "leaves a space that needs to be filled". He awarded the film one out of five stars.
