= The Void (Star Trek: Voyager) =

- Star Trek: Voyager episode
- Episode no.: Season 7 Episode 15
- Directed by: Mike Vejar
- Story by: Raf Green; Kenneth Biller
- Teleplay by: Raf Green; James Kahn
- Production code: 261
- Original air date: February 14, 2001

Guest appearances
- Robin Sachs - Valen; Paul Willson - Loquar; Scott Lawrence - Garon; Jonathan Del Arco - Fantome; Michael Shamus Wiles - Bosaal

Episode chronology
← Previous "Prophecy"	Next → "Workforce, Part I"
- Star Trek: Voyager season 7

"The Void" is the 15th episode of the seventh season of Star Trek: Voyager, the 161st episode overall. Voyager gets trapped in a resource-scarce region of space, and must work with others to survive and escape.

"The Void" aired on the United Paramount Network (UPN) on February 14, 2001.

== Plot ==
While on course for the Alpha Quadrant, Voyager is suddenly pulled into an area of space absent of any matter, and in which a number of other starships have been trapped. In the chaos of their arrival in this area, Voyager is set upon by another ship that disables its shields and transports away its deuterium stock and other supplies before moving away. Captain Janeway orders a counter-attack, but the ship has moved off to warp.

They are approached by another ship which hails them. Its captain, General Valen, explains they are in "The Void", and while impressed with Voyager's response to the attack, believes they can help if they were given some of the ship's photon torpedoes. Janeway refuses, unsure of Valen's purpose. Valen departs with his ship.

Later, Seven offers a potential way out of the Void by recreating one of the funnels to normal space that brought them there via shield modulation. However, though they nearly escape, they are drawn back in forcefully at the last moment, damaging many of the ship's systems. Janeway asserts they must find the ship that stole their supplies to sustain themselves. Tracking the ship, they find it has been attacked with a complete loss of life, and all of its supplies, including those belonging to Voyager are gone. However, among the ship's casing they find a wounded humanoid creature that they bring back to Voyager for treatment.

The crew recognize damage to the ship belonging to Valen's species, and track his ship down. They disable his shields and demand he return their supplies, but Valen refuses. Janeway orders them to recover their supplies and considers taking more, but decides against it. They find they have recovered less than half of that was stolen, and First Officer Chakotay suggests they may have to resort to stealing from other ships to survive, an action Janeway refuses to take. Instead, she offers the idea of creating an alliance with the other ships to pool their resources so they may all escape the Void. Voyager begins contacting the other ships, some of whom agree to the alliance, and the various crews start sharing their resources and technologies, with Voyager itself gaining several useful upgrades for their journey home should they escape.

Meanwhile, the injured humanoid, called Fantome by the Doctor, has recovered. The being is mute and does not appear to understand their language but picks up on sound and music ("Veglia, o donna, questo fiore" from Rigoletto), and Seven works to create a device to allow primitive communication. The Doctor suspects Fantome and others of its species are native to the Void. When Bosaal, another alliance captain, sees Fantome, he calls the species "vermin", noting that they will somehow occupy ships in the Void. When Janeway offers to remove any of Fantome's species from his ship and take them to Voyager, Bosaal agrees and joins the alliance. However, when Janeway finds that a functioning polaron modulator, needed to escape the Void, installed on Voyager was obtained by an act of piracy by Bosaal, she orders the device removed and forces Bosaal off the ship. Lieutenant Tuvok witnesses Bosaal and Valen discussing creating their own alliance to attack Janeway's alliance. Janeway pushes on B'Elanna Torres and Seven to fashion a new polaron modulator before they can launch this attack.

Soon, the alliance's combined technology has completed the necessary modifications to attempt escape. Janeway approaches Fantome to explain they are about to leave. Through the Doctor, Fantome thanks Janeway for her help and offers their help in return. Soon, the alliance fleet is set upon by Valen, Bosaal, and other vessels that aligned with them. Voyager and their alliance are able to disable their shields, and Fantome's people beam aboard these ships, disabling their engines so that they will not trouble the alliance during their escape. The combined shield modulation is successful and all the ships of the alliance escape the Void. After saying their goodbyes, Voyager returns course to home, with Janeway considering their brief time with the alliance like being part of the Federation again.

== Reception ==
Gizmodo ranked "The Void" as the 29th best of the top 100 Star Trek episodes in 2016. In 2011, they had ranked it as the ninth best Star Trek episode.

In 2016, Vox rated this one of the top 25 essential episodes of all Star Trek.

In 2013, Slate ranked "The Void" one of the ten best episodes in the Star Trek franchise.

== Home media releases ==
On December 21, 2003, this episode was released on DVD as part of a Season 7 box set; Star Trek Voyager: Complete Seventh Season.

== See also ==
- Night - a season 5 episode of Voyager where the ship crosses an enormous expanse with no stars visible
- Star Trek: Voyager – Elite Force - a 2000 video game based on Voyager and focuses on the Voyager being trapped in a starship graveyard.
- The Time Trap - an episode of the animated series Star Trek where the heroes' ship is caught in an assumed-inescapable region where resources are drained but escape is possible with cooperation from others.
- Where Silence Has Lease - an episode of Star Trek: The Next Generation that has a similar premise.
- Dark Matters, a 1995 episode of The Outer Limits
- Tinker Tenor Doctor Spy & Renaissance Man, two other episodes involving the Hierarchy species
