= Bianca Guaccero =

Italian actress, singer, and television presenter

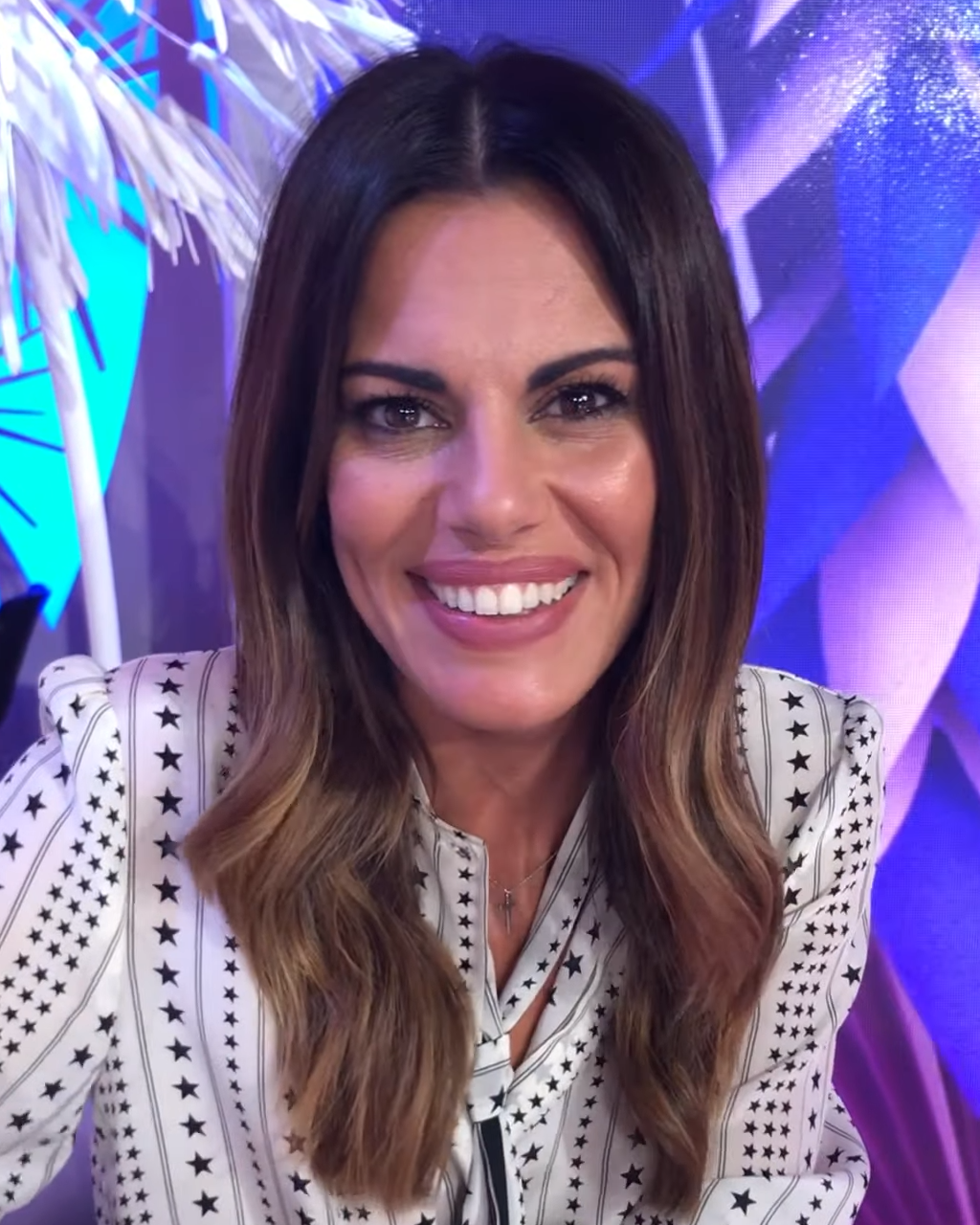
- Guaccero in 2018
- Born: 15 January 1981 (age 45); Bitonto, Bari, Italy
- Occupations: Actress; singer; television presenter
- Height: 1.70 m (5 ft 7 in)

Bianca Guaccero (Italian pronunciation: [ˈbjaŋka ˈɡwattʃero]; born 15 January 1981) is an Italian actress, singer and television presenter.

In February 2010, she resumed her notable role of Carolina Scapece in the Rai 1 series Capri 3. She had played the same part of the conniving Caroline in the first and second Capri series. In 2009, she was one of the cast of Il Bene e il Male ("The Good and the Bad") in which she portrayed a policewoman. In 2006, she had starred in the title role of Assunta Spina, a television mini-series remake of the 1948 film.

== Career ==
Guaccero was born in Bitonto, a municipality in the province of Bari, Italy. She began her career in Italian television in 1996 at the age of fifteen with the variety programme Sotto a Chi Tocca, which also featured showgirl Pamela Prati and comedian Pippo Franco.

In 1999, she made her acting debut in the film Terra Bruciata, directed by Fabio Segatori, in which she played the part of Maria. Since then she has performed regularly in both television and the cinema, and has appeared twice on stage in theatrical productions.

One of her most notable performances has been in the role of the malicious, conniving Carolina Scapece in the Rai Uno mini-series Capri, Capri 2 and Capri 3. She also starred in the title role of Assunta Spina, a mini-series remake of the 1948 film which starred Academy Awards-winning actress Anna Magnani.

In 2008, Guaccero co-hosted the 58th edition of the Sanremo Music Festival with Pippo Baudo and Andrea Osvárt.

She won the 2024 series of the Italian version of Dancing with the Stars, competing alongside Giovanni Pernice.

== Filmography ==
=== Television ===
Year	Title	Role	Notes
1996	Sotto a chi tocca	Herself/host	Game show
2002	John XXIII: The Pope of Peace	Maria	Television film
2002	Tutti i sogni del mondo	Daniela Benardi	Miniseries
2004	Benedetti dal Signore	Zara	Episode: "Missione Zara"
2004	La tassista	Vittoria	Recurring role; 3 episodes
2004	Mai storie d'amore in cucina	Evelina	Miniseries
2005	Imperium: Saint Peter	Silvia	Television film
2006	Assunta Spina	Assunta Spina	Television film
2006–2010	Capri	Carolina Scapece	Main role; 38 episodes
2007	La terza verità	Lidia Roccella	Miniseries
2008	Sanremo Music Festival 2008	Herself/host	Annual music show
2008	La stella della porta accanto	Stella	Miniseries
2009	Il bene e il male	Grazia Micheli	Main role; 12 episodes
2010	Mia madre	Nunzia	Television film
2012	Walter Chiari: Fino all'ultima risata	Valeria Fabrizi	Miniseries
2014	Napoli prima e dopo	Herself/co-host	Annual music show
2014	Purché finisca bene	Valeria	Episode: "Una coppia modello"
2015	Techetechetè	Herself/Guest	Variety show
2015	Tale e quale show	Herself	Constastant (season 5)
2015	L'anno che verrà 2015	Herself/host	Annual music festival
2016	Battiti Live	Herself/host	Live event
2016	L'anno che verrà 2016	Herself/host	Annual music festival
2017	60 Zecchini	Herself	Live event; performer
2017	Sotto copertura	Claudia Ventriglia	Main role (season 2); 8 episodes
2018	In punta di piedi	Lorenza	Television film
2018–2022	Detto fatto	Herself/host	Season 7–10
2024	Ballando con le Stelle	Herself	Winner; series 19
2025	Sanremo Music Festival 2025	Herself/host (introductory segment)	Annual music show
2025	Dalla strada al palco	Herself/host	Talent show

=== Films ===
Year	Title	Role	Notes
1999	Terra bruciata	Maria	
2000	Picasso's Face	Samantha	
2001	Tra due mondi	Angelica	
2001	Witches to the North	Selvaggia	
2002	Il trasformista	Katia	
2005	Shadows in the Sun	MauraHollywood Flies	
2005	Hollywood Flies	Martina	
2019	Il grande spirito	Milena	

== Theatre ==
- Il Sogno del Principe di Salina - L'Ultimo Gattopardo (2006) - Angelica
- Poveri Ma Belli (2008–2009) - Giovanna
