= Renaissance Man (Star Trek: Voyager) =

- Star Trek: Voyager episode
- Episode no.: Season 7 Episode 24
- Directed by: Mike Vejar
- Story by: Andrew Price; Mark Gaberman
- Teleplay by: Phyllis Strong; Mike Sussman
- Production code: 270
- Original air date: May 16, 2001

Guest appearances
- Alexander Enberg - Vorik; Andy Milder - Nar; Wayne Thomas Yorke - Zet; David Sparrow - Alien/Doctor; J. R. Quinonez - Hierarchy/Doctor; Earl Maddox - Uxali Alien

Episode chronology
← Previous "Homestead"	Next → "Endgame"
- Star Trek: Voyager season 7

"Renaissance Man" is the 170th episode of Star Trek: Voyager, and the last standard-length episode of the seventh season (and series). The succeeding episode, "Endgame", is a double-length episode and the series finale.

== Plot ==
En route from a medical conference back to Voyager, the Delta Flyer carrying Captain Janeway and the holographic Doctor is captured by Zet and Nar, ex-members of the Hierarchy. They keep Janeway in captivity and force the Doctor to return to Voyager using disguises enabled by his holo-emitter to get the crew to turn over the warp core and several gel-paks. Zet inserts programming into the Doctor's program to allow them to directly monitor and communicate with him. As the Doctor leaves, Janeway starts talking to Nar in secret away from Zet, hoping to gain his trust.

The Doctor, disguised as Janeway, returns to Voyager in the Delta Flyer and creates a fake transmission from a race called the R'Kaal; the R'Kaal transmission describes the area of space they are in as highly unstable to warp fields, and demands Voyager turns over the warp core, while allowing the crew to settle on a nearby class-M planet. The Doctor — as Janeway — has the Delta Flyer modified to be able to tractor the warp core away should it become unstable. The crew is uneasy at "Janeway's" willingness to give over the warp core so easily, forcing the Doctor to try to hide his tracks, including sedating Chakotay and Kim when they come too close to discovering his identity.

Eventually, Tuvok succeeds in discovering the Doctor's deception and goes to Sick Bay to confront him. He finds the Doctor listening to "The Blue Danube", which the Doctor has been using to mask his communications to Zet from the ship's internal sensors. The Doctor flees via hologram, triggers the ejection of the warp core, and escapes with it using the modified Delta Flyer, leaving no trail that the crew can follow. Shortly afterwards, all the computer systems across the ship begin playing "The Blue Danube", and Seven of Nine recognizes that some of the notes are not correct. They discover the Doctor secretly left a coded message within the recording, and use it to find a warp signature that they can trace. Tuvok and Paris leave in a separate shuttle to follow it.

The Doctor returns to the Hierarchy fleet and is recaptured despite Janeway's orders to not give over the warp core. With the mission considered a success, Zet decides to use the Doctor to similarly infiltrate the Hierarchy's command structure to gain valuable information and begins to program the Doctor with a Hierarchy holo-profile. The volume of data in the profile causes the Doctor's matrix to begin to destabilize. Just then, Tuvok and Paris arrive and begin firing on Zet's ship. Zet tries to eject the warp core with the intent of destroying it and the Voyager shuttle, but the Doctor struggles with Zet to prevent him from firing upon it. In the meantime, Janeway succeeds in beaming out the warp core to where Tom Paris in the Delta Flyer could tractor it back to Voyager. Zet orders Nar to help him fend off the Doctor but Nar, now seeing Zet's recklessness, helps the Doctor to subdue Zet.

With Nar's help, Janeway, the Doctor, and the warp core are recovered and they return quickly to Voyager to help fix the Doctor's destabilizing program. The Doctor bemoans that he will soon die, and makes several deathbed confessions, including professing his love for Seven. However, Torres manages to fix his matrix. The Doctor isolates himself in Sick Bay for a week, embarrassed about his confessions and believing that the crew will hate him for his deception. Janeway visits him and assures him that no one has any hostile feelings towards him, and invites him for coffee in the holodeck.

== Reception ==
A 2021 retrospective by author Keith R. A. DeCandido scored the episode as a 6/10 and as decent, if nothing special. Robert Picardo's EMH was one of the two breakout stars of Voyager, so giving him one final vehicle before the series concluded made sense, and DeCandido thought that seeing the other actors do impersonations of the Doctor impersonating their characters was fun. He did have one complaint: the EMH, while disguised as Janeway, mentions the deaths of many crew members during their voyage out of the Delta Quadrant as a reason to be willing to abandon their warp core. DeCandido thought that this was a traumatic topic that should have come up much more often in Voyager, and should have been played completely seriously, rather than merely being a ruse to get the warp core.

Jammer's Reviews rated the episode 2.5 stars out of 4.

== See also ==
- "Tinker Tenor Doctor Spy", episode featuring a prior appearance of the Hierarchy and its species
- The Void, subsequent episode involving the Hierarchy species
