= Antonio Cupo =

Canadian film and television actor

- Occupation: Actor
- Years active: 2000–present

Antonio Cupo is a Canadian film and television actor.

== Early life ==
Born into a family of Italian immigrants who arrived in Canada in 1968, Cupo is the youngest of three children. His father Manlio is from Palomonte, a small town in the province of Salerno, 70 miles southeast of Naples and 30 east of Salerno and his mother Lucia from Barletta, in the recent Province of Barletta-Andria-Trani. His siblings are Sabato and Carmelina. He graduated in English Literature at the University of British Columbia.

== Career ==
From the age of 6 to 16 he performed in many theatrical production both scholastically and regionally. He was also the lead singer of the band Hybrid Cartel.

His first starring role was under the direction of Fabio Segatori in the film Hollywood Files.

In Italy he is known for his role as the male lead in the second season of Elisa di Rivombrosa. He also starred in the films, directed by Renzo Martinelli, Carnera - The Walking Mountain, Barbarossa, and September Eleven 1683.

Cupo has starred in Hallmark Channel original movies such as Love at the Thanksgiving Day Parade, Hats Off to Christmas!, For Better or for Worse, and In My Dreams.

In 2017, Cupo played the character of John in the Lifetime remake Beaches with actresses Idina Menzel and Nia Long. On April 16, 2022, he starred in the Lifetime thriller film Wrath: A Seven Deadly Sins Story.

== Filmography ==
=== Film ===
Year	Title	Role	Notes
2001	After	-	Short
2002	Saint Sinner	Brother Gregory	TV movie
2003	The Lizzie McGuire Movie	Model #2	
2005	Hollywood Flies	Luca	
2007	Love Notes	Jamie Derringer	
2008	Elegy	Younger Man	
2008	Carnera: The Walking Mountain	Max Baer	
2008	Lost Behind Bars	Kevin Reese	TV movie
2009	Smile	Tommy	
2009	Negli occhi dell'assasino	Alessandro Visconti	TV movie
2009	Barbarossa	Alberto Dell'Orto	
2009	The Whole Truth	Thomas	TV movie
2010	Il ritmo della vita	Antonio	TV movie
2010	Prigioniero di un segreto	-	
2011	Magic Beyond Words	Jorge Arantes	TV movie
2012	American Mary	Billy Barker	
2012	September Eleven 1683	Charles V, Duke of Lorraine	
2012	Love at the Thanksgiving Day Parade	Henry Williams	TV movie
2013	The Husband	Mark Roman	
2013	Hats Off to Christmas!	Nick	TV movie
2014	Anita B.	Aron	
2014	The Good Mistress	David Waterford	TV movie
2014	Bomb Girls: Facing the Enemy	Marco Moretti	TV movie
2014	In My Dreams	Mario	TV movie
2014	For Better of for Worse	Marco Amorini	TV movie
2014	A Christmas Tail	Jack Burgin	TV movie
2015	I Do, I Do, I Do	Dr. Peter Lorenzo	TV movie
2015	The Music in Me	Ben	TV movie
2016	Anything for Love	Charles	TV movie
2017	It Happened in L.A.	Michael	
2017	Beaches	John Pierce	TV movie
2017	Daughter for Sale	John Gallant	TV movie
2017	Body of Deceit	Max	
2018	Devious Nanny	Brian	TV movie
2018	Muse	Sayres (Craig)	TV movie
2018	Pandora's Box	Quin Andronicus	TV movie
2019	Vault	Dominic Ruggiero	
2019	To Have and to Hold	Joe	TV movie
2020	Sleeping with Danger	Paul Carter	TV movie
2020	A Glenbrooke Christmas	Kyle Buchanan	TV movie
2022	The Legend of La Llorona	Andrew Candlewood	
2022	Wrath: A Seven Deadly Sins Story	Xavier Collins	TV movie
2022	Christmas at the Golden Dragon	Nate	TV movie
2023	Game of Love	Nick	TV movie
2023	A Winning Team	Anchor #1	TV movie
2023	Guiding Emily	Matthew	TV movie
2024	Junebug	Waiter	TV movie

=== Television ===
Year	Title	Role	Notes
2000	Beggars and Choosers	Marco	Episode: "Hello, Dalai!"
2000	So Weird	Guitarist	Episode: "Rewind"
2000	The Immortal	Young Rafe	Episode: "Prime Location"
2001	Dark Angel	Valet/Male X5	Guest Cast: Season 1-2
2001	Special Unit 2	Dylan Michaels	Episode: "The Years"
2001	Andromeda	Lt. Gadell	Episode: "Pitiless as the Sun"
2002	The Sausage Factory	Bradford	Episode: "Sex, Guys & Videotape"
2002	Just Deal	Josh	Recurring Cast: Season 3
2002	Just Cause	Ian Story	Episode: "Fading Star"
2002	Taken	Tony	Episode: "Charlie and Lisa"
2003	Black Sash	Matthew	Episode: "Date Night"
2004	The L Word	Beck Bishop	Episode: "Pilot"
2005	Elisa di Rivombrosa	Christian Grey	Main Cast: Season 2
2008	Medici miei	Dott. Anthony Ross	Main Cast
2011	L'ombra del destino	Antonio Principato	Main Cast
2012	6 passi nel giallo	Mathias Caruana	Episode: "Vite in ostaggio"
2012	Supernatural	Whitman Van Ness	Episode: "Of Grave Importance"
2012–13	Bomb Girls	Marco Moretti	Recurring Cast
2013	Murdoch Mysteries	Carl Rodriguez	Episode: "Lovers in a Murderous Time"
2015	Unreal	Harnado	Episode: "Relapse"
2016–17	Ice	Nick	Recurring Cast: Season 1
2017	Girlfriends' Guide to Divorce	Matteo	Episode: "Rule #91: Run Toward What Scares You"
2019	Blood & Treasure	Captain Bruno Fabi	Recurring Cast: Season 1
2022	Peacemaker	Royland Goff	Episode: "Better Goff Dead"
2022	Family Law	Nate	Episode: "Under the Influence"
