= The Legend of La Llorona =

2022 film directed by Patricia Harris Seely

- Theatrical release poster
- Directed by: Patricia Harris Seeley
- Screenplay by: José Prendes
- Story by: Cameron Larson; José Prendes; Patricia Harris Seeley
- Produced by: Cameron Larson; Trevor Steeley
- Starring: Autumn Reeser; Danny Trejo; Antonio Cupo; Zamia Fardiño
- Cinematography: Terry Collier
- Edited by: Rudolf Buitendach
- Music by: Tim Wynn
- Production companies: Ageless Pictures; Film Bridge International; GHSTWRTR
- Distributed by: Saban Films
- Release date: January 7, 2022
- Running time: 98 minutes
- Country: United States
- Language: English
- Box office: $369,334

The Legend of La Llorona is a 2022 American horror film directed by Patricia Harris Seeley and written by José Prendes, Cameron Larson and Patricia Harris Seeley. The film stars Autumn Reeser, Danny Trejo, Antonio Cupo and Zamia Fardiño. The film was released on January 7, 2022.

== Cast ==
- Autumn Reeser as Carly Candlewood
- Antonio Cupo as Andrew Candlewood
- Danny Trejo as Jorge
- Nicolas Madrazo as Danny Candlewood
- Zamia Fardiño as Maria / La Llorona
- Angélica Lara as Veronica
- Edgar Wuotto as Pedro Pablo
- Fernanda Aguilar as Isabella
- Josh Zaharia as Eduardo

== Release ==
The Legend of La Llorona had a limited theater opening on January 7, 2022. On January 11, it was released on streaming.

== Reception ==
On the review aggregator website Rotten Tomatoes, 7% of 15 critics' reviews are positive, with an average rating of 3.1/10.
