= Autumn Reeser =

American actress (born 1980)

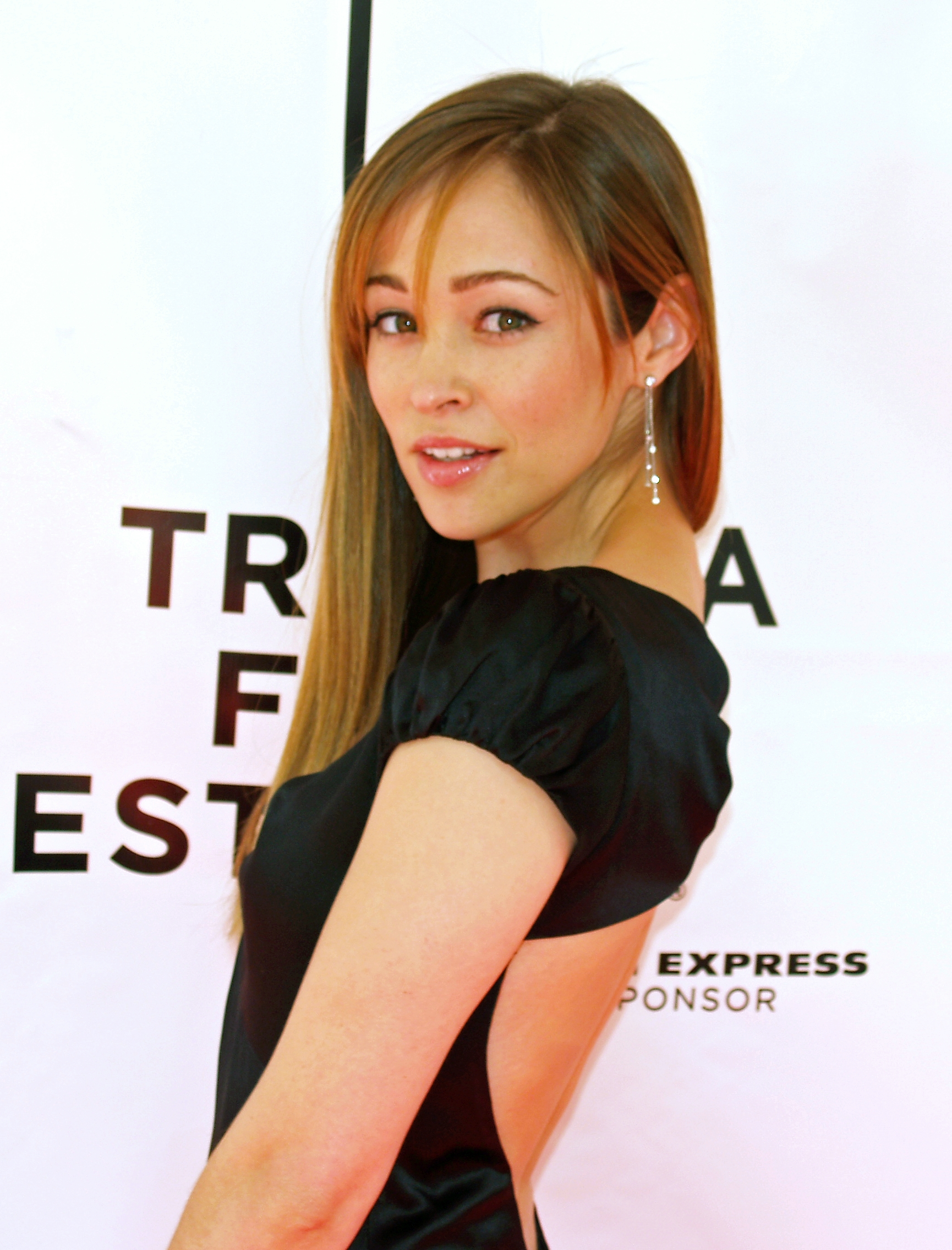
- Reeser at the 2007 Tribeca Film Festival
- Born: September 21, 1980 (age 46)
- Education: UCLA; Beverly Hills Playhouse
- Occupation: Actress
- Years active: 2000–present
- Known for: No Ordinary Family; The O.C.
- Spouse: Jesse Warren (m. 2009; div. 2014)
- Children: 2
- Website: www.autumnreeser.com

Autumn Reeser (born September 21, 1980) is an American actress. She is known for her roles as Taylor Townsend on the Fox series The O.C., Lizzie Grant on HBO's Entourage, Katie Andrews on ABC's No Ordinary Family, and Leslie Bellcamp on E!'s The Arrangement. She has appeared in the films The Girl Next Door (2004), So Undercover (2012), Sully (2016), and in over a dozen Hallmark Channel television films in leading roles.

== Early life ==
Reeser graduated from UCLA's School of Theater, Film and Television in 2004. She also studied acting at the Beverly Hills Playhouse.

== Career ==
=== Television ===
Early in her career, she appeared in television commercials for Burger King, Clean & Clear and International House of Pancakes. Her first on-screen appearance was a role as Ventu Girl in the episode "Natural Law" of UPN's Star Trek: Voyager. Shortly thereafter, she booked guest roles in television shows CSI: Crime Scene Investigation, Birds of Prey and Cold Case, and moved onto recurring roles in the sitcoms Grounded for Life, Maybe It's Me and Complete Savages. She rose to fame through her role as Taylor Townsend on the Fox series The O.C. (2005–2007). She reflected back on the character during a 2010 interview, saying "I feel like there's a lot of girls out there who could really relate to her, who hadn't seen themselves on TV in that way. I loved that about her. I loved that she made no apologies for who she was even though she wasn't what all the magazines said was OK. She was like, 'I'm still valid. And I'm awesome. And I know I'm odd, and that's OK.'"

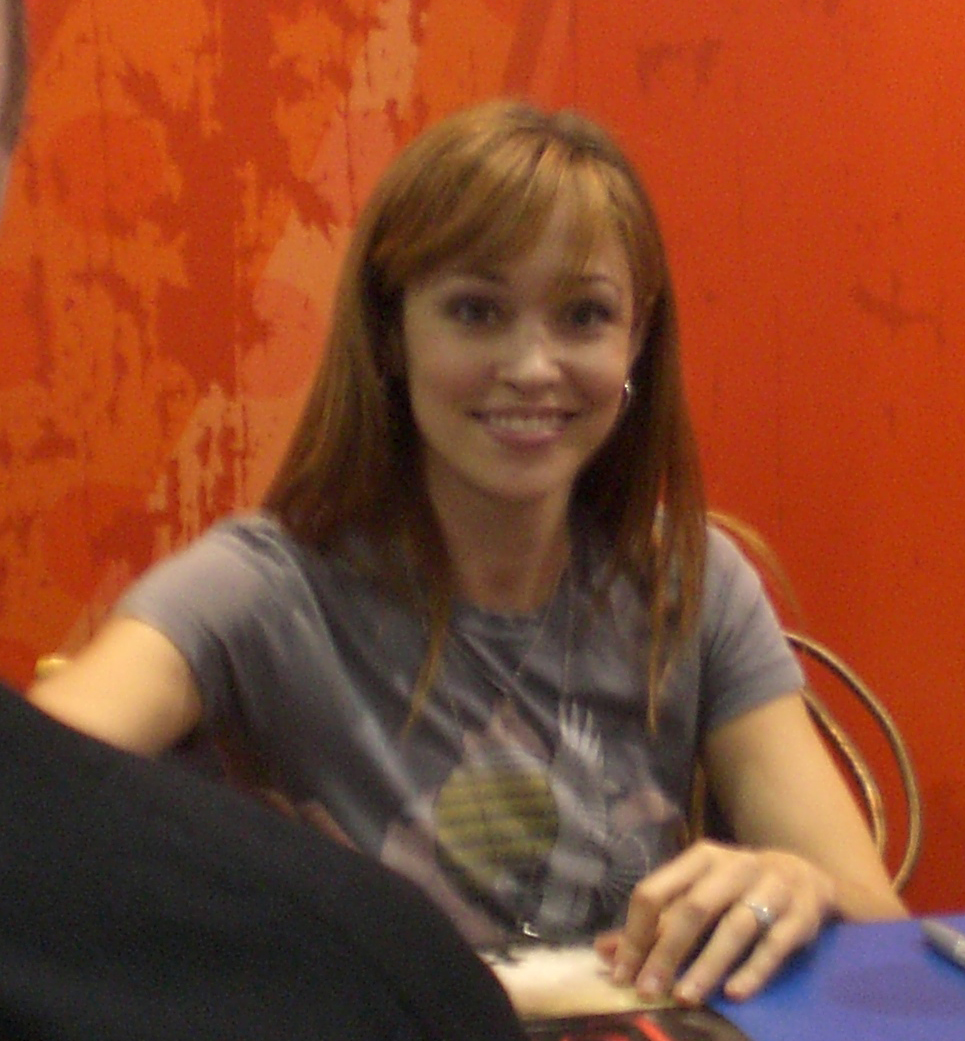
Autumn Reeser signing autographs for Lost Boys: The Tribe fans in 2008

Reeser portrayed Lizzy Grant in ten episodes of HBO's comedy-drama television series Entourage (2009–2010). First appearing in the show's sixth season, Lizzie is a junior agent working in the Miller Gold Agency's TV division under Andrew Klein, with whom she has an affair. Reeser played Phoebe Valentine, a goddess from Greek mythology in The CW's romantic comedy-drama series Valentine (2008–2009). In 2009, she portrayed lawyer Ashley Hastings in three episodes of TNT's legal drama series Raising the Bar. Reeser played Katie Andrews, Julie Benz's personal assistant in ABC's No Ordinary Family (2010–2011). The show centers on the Powells, a typical American family living in fictional Pacific Bay, California, whose members gain special powers after their plane crashes in the Amazon, Brazil. Reeser also had roles as Kylie Sinclair in Last Resort, as Dr. Gabrielle Asano in Hawaii Five-0 and as Abigail Bruce in Necessary Roughness. She had guest roles in several television shows, including It's Always Sunny In Philadelphia, Ghost Whisperer, Pushing Daisies, Human Target, Royal Pains, Jane by Design, and Hart of Dixie.

In 2015, Reeser portrayed Amanda Weil in three episodes of ABC's science fiction drama series The Whispers. In 2017, she had a recurring role as Tess, Darius Tanz's childhood sweetheart, on the CBS show Salvation. She played talent agent Leslie Bellcamp on the two seasons of The Arrangement, on the E! network. The series follows an unknown actress who, after a successful audition, is plucked from obscurity and offered a secret contract to be the fiancée to Kyle West, one of Hollywood's biggest stars. In 2018, she made a guest appearance as Dr. Wells on Fox's procedural drama television series 9-1-1, in the episode "Let Go".

=== Films ===
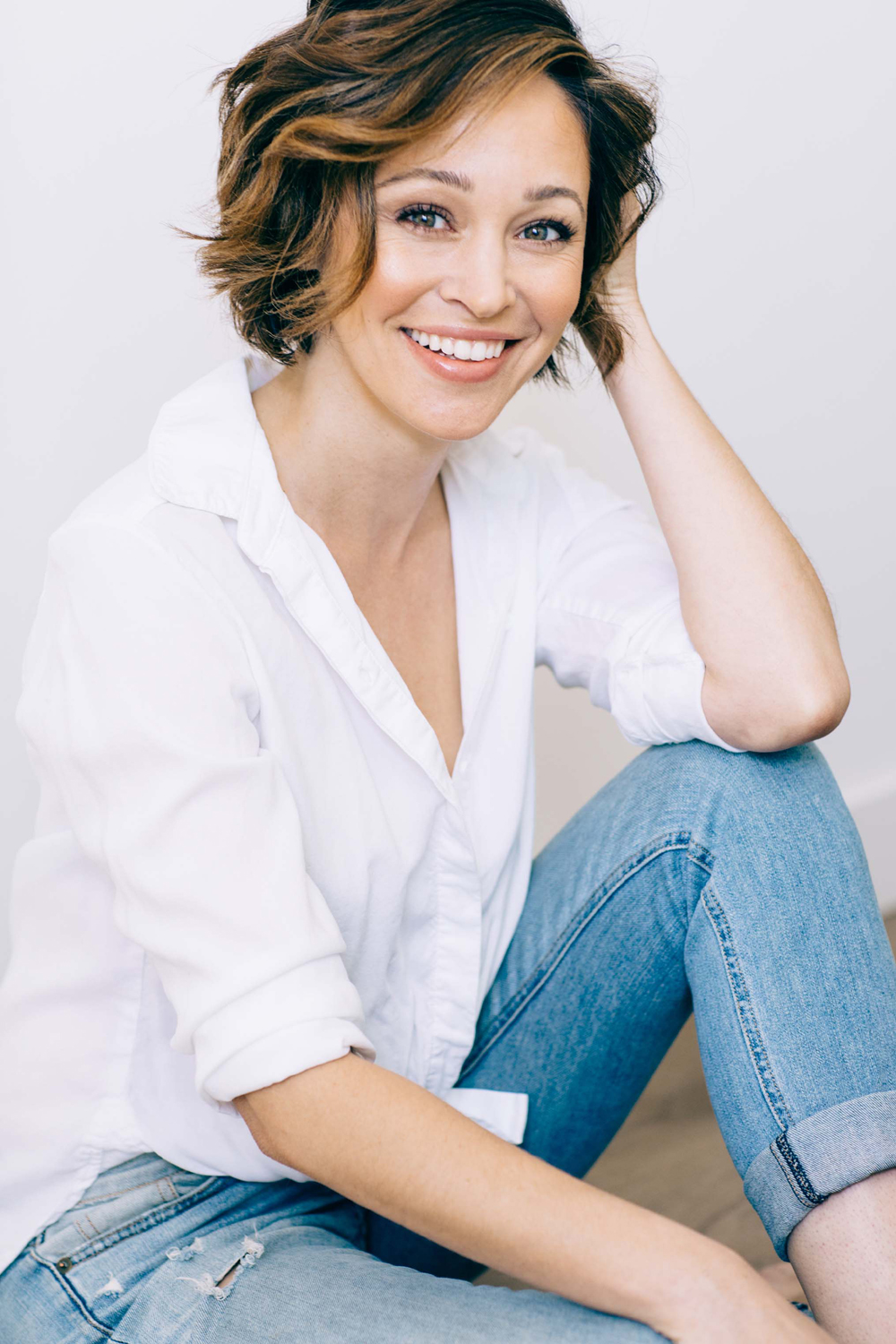
Reeser in 2019

Reeser has appeared in several feature films and television movies, such as the musical The American Mall with Nina Dobrev, the comedy The Girl Next Door with Elisha Cuthbert, the horror film Lost Boys: The Tribe with Corey Feldman, the thriller The Big Bang with Antonio Banderas, the action movie Smokin' Aces 2: Assassins' Ball with Tom Berenger and the detective comedy So Undercover with Miley Cyrus. She appeared in Clint Eastwood's biographical drama film Sully (2016), released on September 2, 2016. The film received positive reviews from critics and grossed over $240 million worldwide. She also appeared in films Kill 'Em All (2017), Valley of Bones (2017), Dead Trigger (2017), and The Legend of La Llorona (2022).

In late 2012, she received positive reviews for Hallmark Channel's Love at the Thanksgiving Day Parade, in which she was the main heroine. Shortly after, she appeared in a number of romantic comedies aired on the Hallmark Channel, with leading roles in Midnight Masquerade (2014), I Do, I Do, I Do (2015), A Country Wedding (2015), Valentine Ever After (2016), A Bramble House Christmas (2017), Season for Love (2018), Love on the Menu (2019), All Summer Long (2019), Christmas Under the Stars (2019), A Glenbrooke Christmas (2020) and Always Amore (2022).

In 2022, she joined forces with fellow Hallmark Channel regulars Lacey Chabert and Alison Sweeney in the Wedding Veil trilogy, about three long-time friends who find an antique wedding veil, reputed to bring its possessor her destined partner. She played Emma, who teaches art history and later travels to Italy to investigate the veil's origin. The three actresses reprised their roles for a sequel trilogy that aired in 2023.

=== Theater ===
Since 2006, she has been a member of The WorkJuice Players, a theater troupe primarily known for The Thrilling Adventure Hour, a popular Los Angeles staged production in the style of old-time radio. She stars in the Amelia Earhart segment, playing the famed pilot, traveling through time; as well as playing a wide variety of other characters in other segments. In 2015, Reeser and The Thrilling Adventure Hour were invited to perform in New York City and Chicago, then Australia (Sydney) and New Zealand (Auckland and Wellington). Other members in the troupe include Paul F. Tompkins, Paget Brewster and Busy Philipps.

An accomplished singer and dancer, Reeser has played in many musicals throughout her life. She also sang in numerous cabarets around Los Angeles, including Upright Cabaret and the acclaimed For The Record: Quentin Tarantino (Show at Barre). Reeser played Julie Cooper in The O.C. one-night musical, which took place at The Federal Bar in North Hollywood on August 30, 2015. In 2019, she starred in the West Coast premiere of Nicky Silver's Too Much Sun at the Odyssey Theater in Los Angeles.

=== Video games ===
Reeser played the character of Lissette Hanley in the video game Command & Conquer: Red Alert 3, released in 2008.

=== Other ventures ===
Reeser was featured on the cover of December 2006 issue of Stuff magazine. She has also appeared in editorials for Maxim, Celebrity Skin and Zooey. She was ranked at number 57 on the Maxim magazine's "Hot 100 of 2006" list, at number 65 on the Maxim "Hot 100 of 2007" list and at number 85 on the Maxim "Hot 100 of 2011" list.

== Personal life ==
On May 9, 2009, Reeser married writer and director Jesse Warren in Ojai, California. The couple has two sons. In November 2014, Reeser filed for divorce from Warren and requested joint physical and legal custody of their children.

Author and friend Patrick Loubatière wrote her 2014 biography, titled No Ordinary Girl, published in English and French.

In 2015, she was elected to SAG-AFTRA's National and Los Angeles Local Boards.

== Filmography ==
=== Film ===
Film appearances by Autumn Reeser
Year	Title	Role	Notes
2004	Art Thief Musical!	Clarity	Short film
2004	The Girl Next Door	Jane	
2005	Our Very Own	Melora Kendal	
2006	Americanese	Sylvia	
2007	Palo Alto	Jamie	
2008	Lost Boys: The Tribe	Nicole Emerson	Direct-to-video
2010	The Big Bang	Fay Neman	
2010	Smokin' Aces 2: Assassins' Ball	Kaitlyn "AK-47" Tremor	Direct-to-video
2012	Possessions	Jessica	
2012	So Undercover	Bizzy	
2016	Sully	Tess Sosa	
2017	Kill 'Em All	Suzanne	
2017	Valley of Bones	Anna	
2017	Dead Trigger	Tara Conlan	
2022	The Legend of La Llorona	Carly Candlewood	
2023	Beautiful Disaster	Professor Felder	
TBA	Out of the Ashes †	TBA	Post-production

=== Television ===
Television appearances by Autumn Reeser
Year	Title	Role	Notes
2001	Star Trek: Voyager	Ventu girl	Episode: "Natural Law"
2001	Thrills	Allison	Episode: "A Most Dangerous Desire"
2001	Undressed	Erica	7 episodes
2001–2004	Grounded for Life	Alison	Recurring (seasons 2–4)
2002	Birds of Prey	Sherry	Episode: "Prey for the Hunter"
2002	The Brady Bunch in the White House	Marcia Brady	Television film
2002	Maybe It's Me	Becky	Episodes: "The Prom Episode, Parts 1 and 2"
2002–2003	George Lopez	Piper Morey	Episodes: "Token of Unappreciation" and "Girl Fight"
2003	CSI: Crime Scene Investigation	Rachel Lyford	Episode: "Invisible Evidence"
2004	Cold Case	Grace Ashley	Episode: "The Boy in the Box"
2004–2005	Complete Savages	Angela	Recurring role
2005	It's Always Sunny in Philadelphia	Megan	Episode: "Charlie Wants an Abortion"
2005–2007	The O.C.	Taylor Townsend	Recurring role (season 3); main role (season 4)
2006	Independent Lens	Lauren	Episode: "My Life... Disoriented"
2007	Ghost Whisperer	Sloane Alexander	Episode: "Don't Try This at Home"
2007	Nature of the Beast	Julia Sullivan	Television film
2008	The American Mall	Madison Huxley	Television musical
2008	Pushing Daisies	Kentucky Fitz	Episode: "Bzzzzzzzzz!"
2008–2009	Valentine	Phoebe Valentine	Main role
2009	Raising the Bar	Ashley Hastings	3 episodes
2009–2010	Entourage	Lizzie Grant	Recurring role (seasons 6–7)
2010	The Bannen Way	Jailbait	Web series
2010	Human Target	Layla / Niteowl	Episodes: "Lockdown" and "Baptiste"
2010–2011	No Ordinary Family	Katie Andrews	Main role
2011	Royal Pains	Jane Cameron	Episode: "Run, Hank, Run"
2011–2013	Hawaii Five-0	Gabrielle Asano	Recurring role (seasons 2–4)
2012	Jane by Design	Charlotte Whitmore	Episode: "The Wedding Gown"
2012	Love at the Thanksgiving Day Parade	Emily Jones	Television film
2012–2013	Last Resort	Kylie Sinclair	Main role
2013	Necessary Roughness	Abigail Bruce	Recurring role (season 3)
2014	Midnight Masquerade	Elyse Samford	Television film
2015	A Country Wedding	Sarah Standor	Television film
2015	Hart of Dixie	Olivia Green	Episode: "Bluebell"
2015	I Do, I Do, I Do	Jaclyn Palmer	Television film
2015	The Whispers	Amanda Weil	3 episodes
2016	Criminal Minds: Beyond Borders	Sue Davis	Episode: "Love Interrupted"
2016	Valentine Ever After	Julia	Television film
2017	A Bramble House Christmas	Willa Fairchild	Television film
2017	Salvation	Theresa / Tess	3 episodes
2017–2018	The Arrangement	Leslie Bellcamp	Recurring role
2018	9-1-1	Dr. Wells	Episode: "Let Go"
2018	Season for Love	Tyler Dawson	Television film
2019	All Summer Long	Tia	Television film
2019	Christmas Under the Stars	Julie Gibbons	Television film
2019	Love on the Menu	Maggie Young	Television film
2020	A Glenbrooke Christmas	Jessica Morgan	Television film
2021	The 27-Hour Day	Lauren Garrett	Television film
2022	The Wedding Veil	Emma Lowell	Television film
2022	The Wedding Veil Unveiled	Emma Lowell	Television film
2022	4400	Sienna Stone	Episode: "Present Is Prologue"
2022	The Wedding Veil Legacy	Emma De Stefano	Television film
2022	Always Amore	Elizabeth	Television film
2023	The Wedding Veil Expectations	Emma De Stefano	Television film
2023	The Wedding Veil Inspiration	Emma De Stefano	Television film
2023	The Wedding Veil Journey	Emma De Stefano	Television film
2024	Junebug	Juniper	Television film
2025	We Met in December	Annie Lane	Television film

=== Voice work ===
Year	Title	Voice work	Notes
2014–2023	The Thrilling Adventure Hour: The Adventures of Captain Laserbeam	Investigateen Elliott; Adventurekateer Deborah; Reporter 1 Adventurekateer Claudia	Episode: "Three Sides to Every Story"; Episode: "Disenchantment Under the Sea (Lockdown)"; Episode: "Two Lights Make a Wrong"; Episode: "The Great Watery Throwdown"

== Bibliography ==
Patrick Loubatière. Autumn Reeser – No Ordinary Girl (Book, 2014).
