= Eleonora Pedron =

Italian model and actress

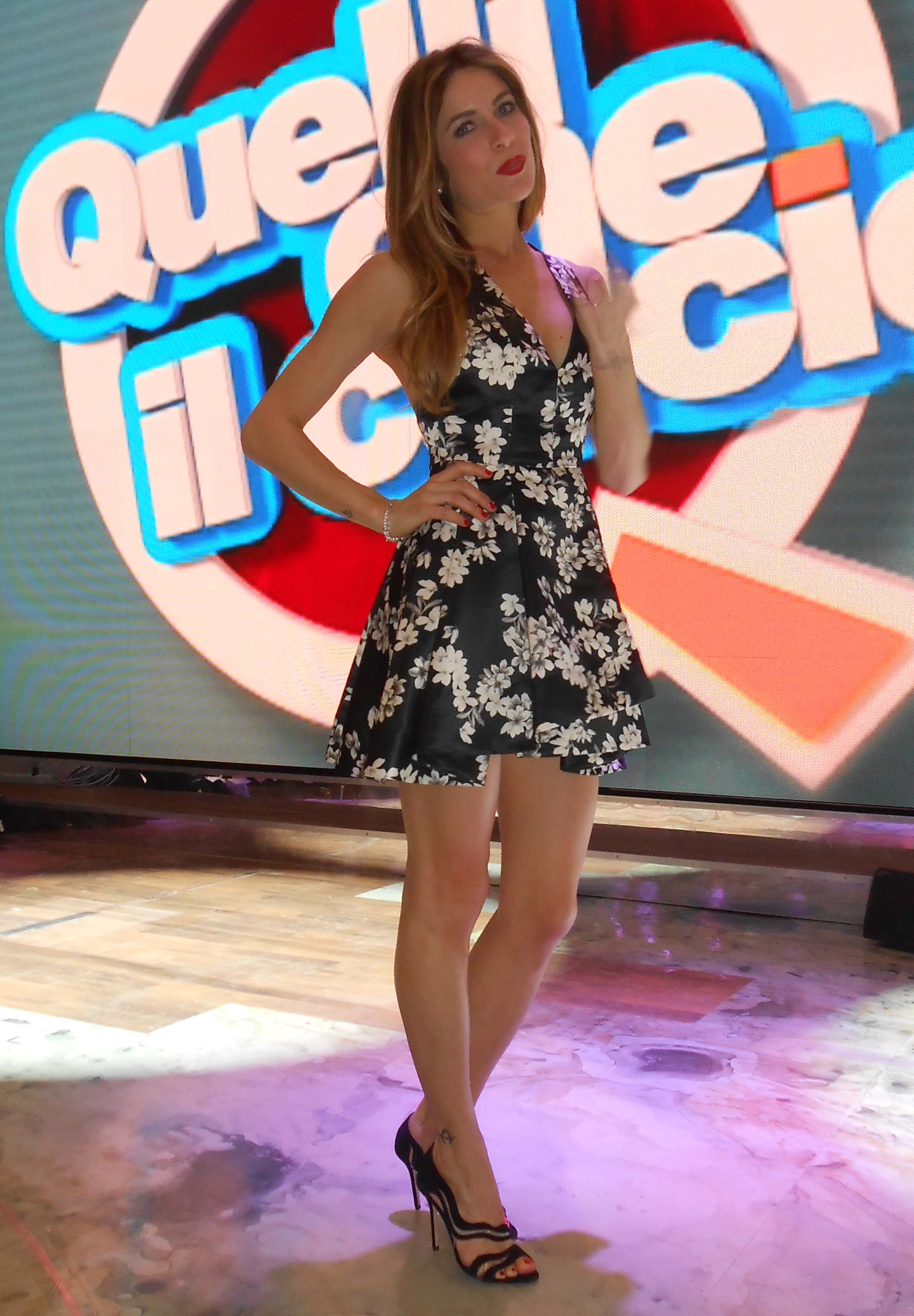
- Born: Eleonora Pedron; 13 July 1982 (age 43); Padua, Italy
- Occupations: Model and actress
- Years active: 2002-present

Eleonora Pedron (born 13 July 1982) is an Italian model and actress who was crowned Miss Italia 2002. She was later briefly a weather presenter on Italy's Rete 4 channel but was suspended after posing in just a G-string in Capital magazine. As an actress, she was seen in the TV series Donna Detective.

== Filmography ==
=== Cinema ===
- Vita Smeralda, 2006
- The Seed of Discord, 2008

=== Television ===
- Medici miei, 2008
- Così fan tutte, 2009
- Donna Detective, 2010
- Tre sorelle, 2022

== Personal life ==
Pedron has two children by her then-boyfriend, the 2012 World Superbike Championship winner Max Biaggi.
