= Max Biaggi =

Italian motorcycle racer (born 1971)

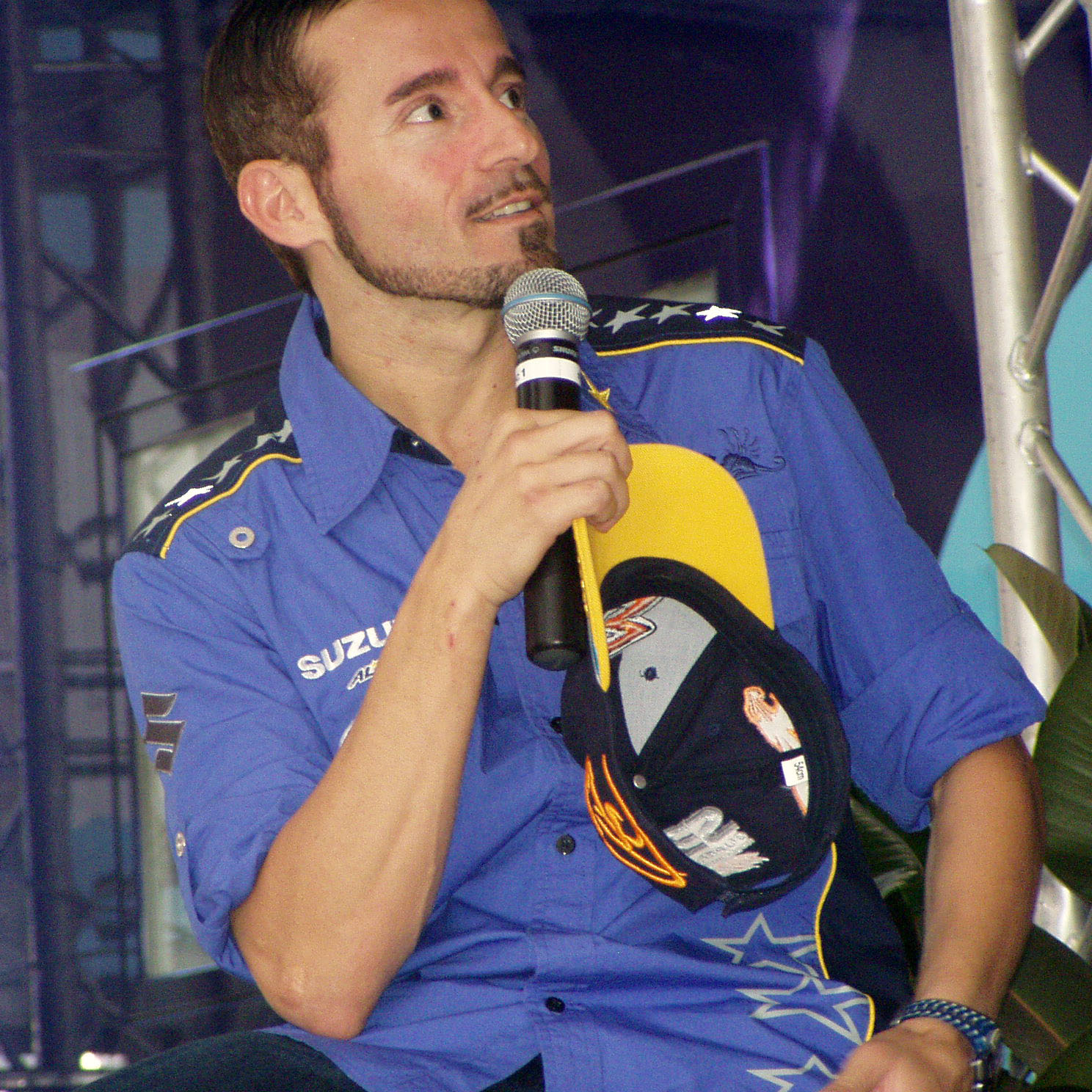
- Biaggi in 2007
- Nationality: Italian
- Born: 26 June 1971 (age 55); Rome, Italy
- Website: max-biaggi.com
Motorcycle racing career statistics
MotoGP World Championship
Active years	1998–2005
Manufacturers	Honda (1998, 2003–2005); Yamaha (1999–2002)
Championships	0
2005 championship position	5th (173 pts)
Starts / Wins / Podiums / Poles / F. laps / Points; 127 / 13 / 58 / 23 / 14 / 1624
250cc World Championship
Active years	1991–1997
Manufacturers	Aprilia (1991–1992, 1994–1996); Honda (1993, 1997)
Championships	4 (1994, 1995, 1996, 1997)
1997 championship position	1st (250 pts)
Starts / Wins / Podiums / Poles / F. laps / Points; 87 / 29 / 53 / 33 / 28 / 1268
Superbike World Championship
Active years	2007–2012, 2015
Manufacturers	Suzuki (2007); Ducati (2008); Aprilia (2009–2012, 2015)
Championships	2 (2010, 2012)
2015 championship position	20th (36 pts)
Starts / Wins / Podiums / Poles / F. laps / Points; 159 / 21 / 71 / 5 / 18 / 2102

Massimiliano "Max" Biaggi (Italian pronunciation: [ˈmaks ˈbjaddʒi]; born 26 June 1971) is an Italian former professional Grand Prix and Superbike motorcycle road racer who achieved six World Championships. With four 250 cc road race titles and two in World Superbikes, he is one of only two riders to score championships across both disciplines.

Biaggi is a brand ambassador for Aprilia motorcycles. Between 2019 and 2022, he owned a Moto3 racing team, based in Monaco.

In 2020, Biaggi was named a FIM Road Racing Legend, followed by inductance into the MotoGP Hall of Fame in 2022.

== Career ==
=== Summarised race history ===
Biaggi is a 13-time Premier Class race winner. He is a four-time 250 cc World Champion, two-time World Superbike Champion and three-time runner-up in the Premier Class in 1998, 2001 and 2002.

After winning four consecutive 250 cc titles in 1994, 1995, 1996 and 1997, Biaggi moved to the 500 cc class in 1998 and immediately finished runner-up to Mick Doohan with two victories with private Honda. Biaggi left Honda for the factory Yamaha team in 1999 following disagreements over the machinery supplied to him. In his four seasons with Yamaha, Biaggi collected eight victories and finished runner-up to Valentino Rossi in 2001 and 2002. Then he moved to Camel Honda in 2003, but only managed third place in the championship in 2003 and 2004 beaten by not only Valentino Rossi but also Gresini Honda rider Sete Gibernau. A sole winless season followed in 2005 with Factory Honda Team and Biaggi was replaced by Dani Pedrosa for 2006 even though he got four podiums and a fifth place in the championship. This proved to be Biaggi's final season in MotoGP.

In 2007, Biaggi switched to the Superbike World Championship finishing third overall as a rookie and earned his first Superbike World Championship in 2010 becoming only the second European from outside the United Kingdom after Raymond Roche to do so. After winning a second World Superbike Championship title in 2012 at the age of 41, becoming the oldest champion in the series’ history—Biaggi retired from racing.

A consistent rider, in all of his eight seasons with MotoGP/500 cc, Biaggi finished inside the top-five in the championship standings and three times as championship runner-up in 1998, 2001 and 2002. Winning a race for seven consecutive seasons in the premier class from 1998 to 2004. Biaggi's 13 wins, 58 podiums and 23 pole positions in the premier class makes him one of the most accomplished riders to not win the MotoGP World Championship.

=== Beginnings ===
As a child, Biaggi showed a greater interest in football than in motorcycling. However, in 1989, after his first motorbike experience, he began to focus on racing. He made his competitive debut at the age of eighteen in the 125cc class. In 1990, he won the Italian Sport Production Championship. Biaggi progressed to the 250cc class and entered international competition. In 1991, riding an Aprilia RS250, he won the European 250cc Championship. During the same season, he also participated in four races of the 250cc World Championship as a wildcard entrant, scoring points in the two races he completed.

Biaggi’s path to the world championship was atypical, as he entered competitive motorcycle racing relatively late and without a family background in the sport, having been raised solely by his father. By contrast, his rival Valentino Rossi was introduced to motorsport in pre-school childhood as the son of former Grand Prix rider Graziano Rossi and progressed to Grand Prix racing at a much younger age.

=== 250cc World Championship ===
In 1992, Biaggi completed his first full season in the 250 cc Grand Prix class with Aprilia, finishing fifth overall and taking his maiden Grand Prix victory in the last race of the season held at Kyalami, South Africa. In 1993, he joined Honda and finished fourth in the championship standings, including a single race win at the European motorcycle Grand Prix held in Barcelona.

Returning to Aprilia in 1994, Biaggi dominated the 250 cc class, winning three consecutive world championships in 1994, 1995, and 1996. During this period, his black Chesterfield-liveried Aprilia became one of the most recognisable motorcycles of the 1990s Grand Prix era. For the 1997 Grand Prix motorcycle racing season, Biaggi made an unusual move by leaving the championship-winning Aprilia team to return to Honda, riding for Erv Kanemoto’s squad, and secured his fourth consecutive 250 cc world title.

With four titles, Biaggi became the joint most successful rider in the history of the 250 cc World Championship, sharing the record with Phil Read. Biaggi’s prolonged stay outside the premier class reflected the looser hierarchy of Grand Prix racing prior to the introduction of the MotoGP era in 2002, when long-term careers in lower categories were still considered legitimate, as exemplified by MotoGP legend Ángel Nieto, a 13-time world champion in the 50 cc and 125 cc classes.

Following his fourth title, Biaggi moved up to the 500 cc class.

=== 500cc World Championship ===
Biaggi made an impressive start in his 500cc debut, qualifying on pole, setting the fastest lap and winning his first race in the 1998 Japanese motorcycle Grand Prix at Suzuka, riding for the private Kanemoto Honda team. He was also victorious at the Czech Republic Grand Prix, where he almost crashed when he did a 90° wheelie. With three races remaining in the season, Biaggi was leading the championship when he crossed the finish line first at the 1998 Catalan motorcycle Grand Prix. During the race, he was controversially given a stop-and-go penalty for an alleged yellow-flag infringement, which he did not serve, disputing the decision. Race control subsequently displayed the black flag, and Biaggi was disqualified despite finishing first.

The incident proved decisive for the title outcome, which was ultimately won by Mick Doohan on a factory Honda. Biaggi finished second overall and, following disputes over unequal machinery (Doohan’s Screamer versus Biaggi’s Big Bang), left Honda after the 1998 season to join Yamaha, then widely regarded as less competitive—a view underscored by Honda riders occupying the top-five places in the final standings.

Biaggi's first season with Yamaha in 1999 proved difficult, and he finished fourth overall, followed by third place in 2000. His strongest Yamaha campaign came in 2001, the final year of the 500 cc era. Three victories brought him within ten points of championship leader Valentino Rossi ahead of the Czech Republic motorcycle Grand Prix at Brno. However, Biaggi crashed while leading the race after losing front-end grip, a recurring problem with the Yamaha YZR500. The team had already developed and tested a single-crankshaft prototype in 2000 to address the issue, but abandoned the project after mixed test results, retaining its established twin-crankshaft design for 2001. Further front-end crashes, including while leading the Pacific Grand Prix at Motegi, undermined Biaggi's title challenge. He ultimately finished second in the championship behind Rossi.

=== MotoGP World Championship ===
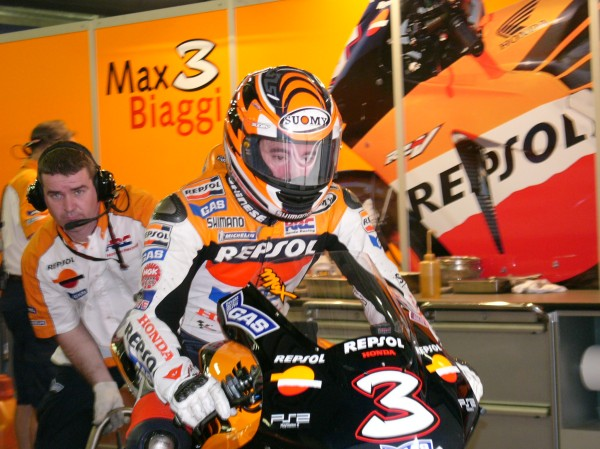
Biaggi with Repsol Honda in 2005

In the 2002 MotoGP World Championship, Max Biaggi competed for Yamaha during the inaugural four-stroke MotoGP season. Yamaha’s motorcycle proved significantly less competitive than Honda’s in the early part of the year, and across the first eight races Biaggi failed to secure a victory, falling 106 points behind championship leader Valentino Rossi. During this phase of the season, Yamaha’s engine operated with a reduced displacement of 942 cc. Continued development later in the year, including progression to the full 990 cc regulatory limit, resulted in a marked improvement in performance: Biaggi claimed victories at Brno and Sepang, conceding only a further 34 points over the remaining eight races. He ultimately finished the season second overall.

The difficulties encountered during the early stages of 2002 contributed to Biaggi signing with Honda’s satellite Camel Pramac Pons team for the 2003 onwards. He finished third in the championship standings in both seasons he spent in the team, securing two victories in 2003 at the Great Britain and in Pacific Grand Prix (the former following a penalty imposed on Rossi) and one in 2004. Despite fewer wins, Biaggi was considered more competitive in 2004; following his victory at Sachsenring, he trailed eventual champion Rossi by just one point at mid-season, before a crash at Estoril curtailed his title challenge.

For the 2005 MotoGP World Championship, Biaggi joined the Repsol Honda Team as a factory rider alongside Nicky Hayden, working again with technical director Erv Kanemoto. Expectations were high, but the season proved disappointing: Biaggi finished fifth overall, recording his first premier-class campaign without a race victory. With four races remaining he was second in the standings, but retirements and lower finishes cost him ground, amid increasingly strained team relations.

Biaggi lost his ride for the 2006 season, with his position filled by reigning 250 cc World Champion Dani Pedrosa. He subsequently entered negotiations with Honda, Kawasaki, and other teams, but was ultimately unable to secure a contract, despite the backing of major tobacco sponsor Camel. It was reported at the time that Honda opposed Biaggi continuing in MotoGP even with a satellite team; consequently, the Honda Pons team withdrew from the championship, and Honda effectively prevented Biaggi from competing. As a result, Biaggi announced that he would not take part in the 2006 MotoGP season.

=== Superbike World Championship ===
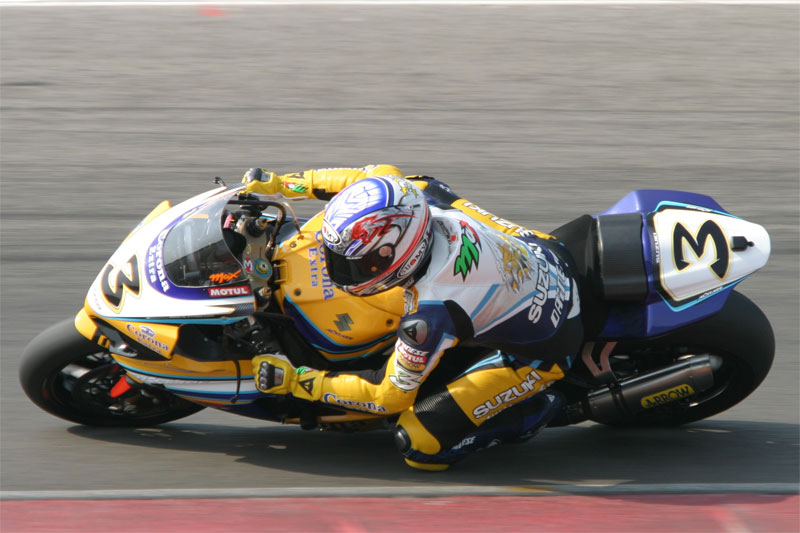
Biaggi at WK SBK Assen 2007

After failing to secure a last-minute deal with Corona Alstare Suzuki for 2006, Max Biaggi took a sabbatical before signing with the team for the 2007 World Superbike season, replacing Troy Corser. He made an immediate impact by winning his Superbike debut at Losail, becoming the only rider to win on debut in both Superbike and 500cc Grand Prix racing. Biaggi finished the season third overall.

Attempts to return to MotoGP for 2008 were blocked by a Honda veto, and he instead raced for Team Sterilgarda/Go Eleven on a satellite Ducati in World Superbike. After two podiums in Qatar, he started 16th at Phillip Island following a Superpole mechanical failure and crashed out of both races while running in podium positions, suffering a fractured left radius. Despite missing no races, the injury hampered his season. He finished seventh with no wins. In 2022, Biaggi alleged that Ducati had deliberately reduced his engine's power by 15–18 hp to avoid potential performance restrictions on Ducati's twin-cylinder motorcycles and to favour factory rider Troy Bayliss.

Biaggi joined the returning factory Aprilia team in 2009, a season focused primarily on development of the RSV4. He secured the team's first victory at Brno and finished fourth overall.

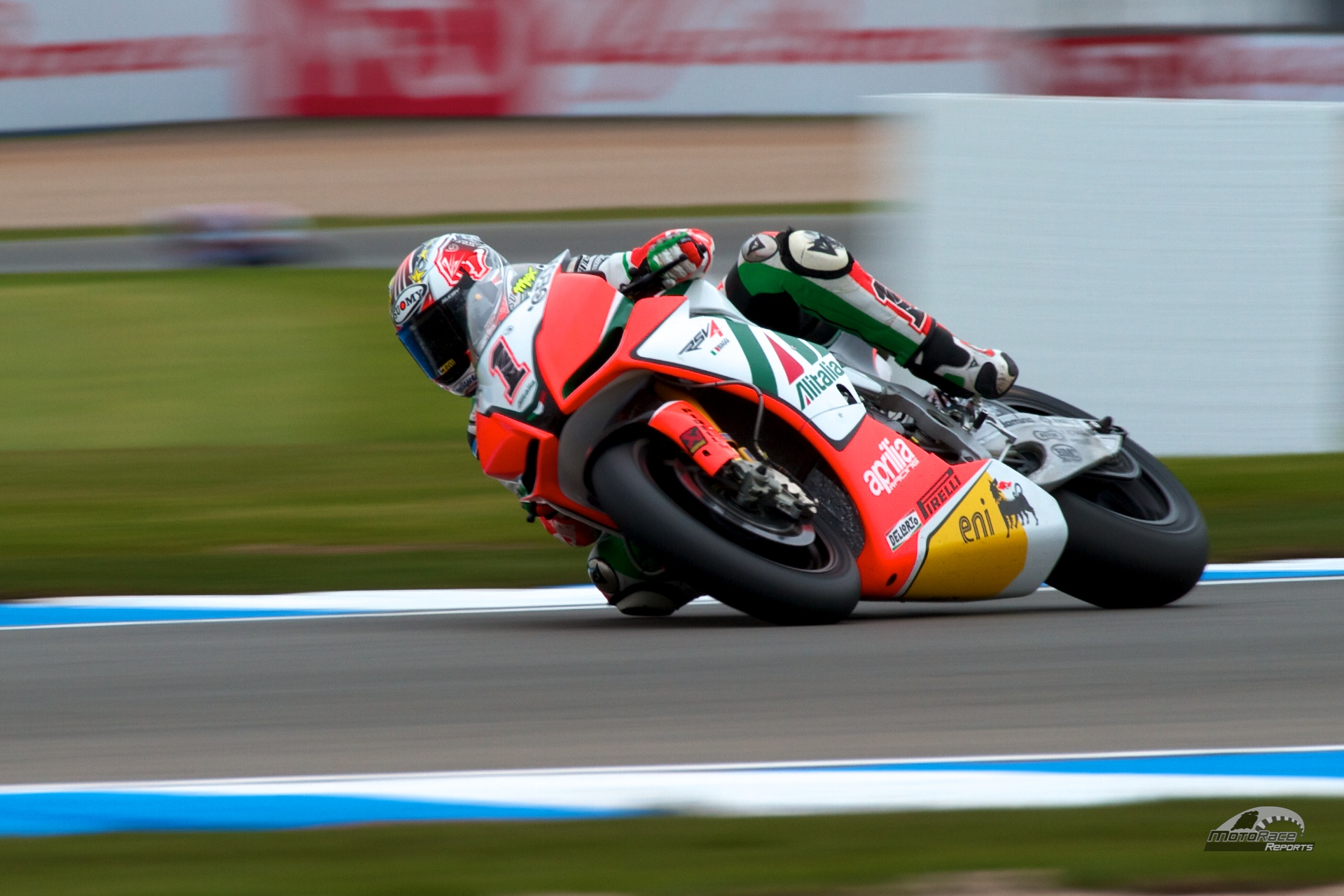
Biaggi riding the RSV4 in 2011

The breakthrough came in 2010, when Biaggi claimed Aprilia’s and Italy’s first Superbike World Championship title. In 2011, he remained a title contender despite limited wins, but a foot injury caused him to miss two rounds and he finished third. He reclaimed the championship in 2012 by a narrow margin over Tom Sykes, after which he retired from full-time competition.

Following his retirement, Biaggi completed a MotoGP test with Ducati in 2013 and made a brief competitive return in 2015 as a wildcard for Aprilia, securing a podium finish and becoming the oldest rider to stand on a Superbike World Championship podium.

== Personal life and rivalries ==
Biaggi is known as the 'Roman Emperor' and 'Mad Max' and is notorious for his difficult relationships with the press, team personnel and other riders.

Biaggi’s combative personality was evident in his rivalry with Mick Doohan during the 1998 500cc season. As a leading title contender, Biaggi engaged in a series of public disputes with the reigning champion, particularly around the controversial Catalan Grand Prix, where tensions escalated following Biaggi’s penalty and subsequent disqualification. Doohan openly criticised Biaggi in the media, questioning both his attitude and achievements, while Biaggi accused Doohan of benefiting from superior factory machinery. The episode intensified personal animosity between the two and underscored the fractious nature of Biaggi’s relationships with fellow riders.

Biaggi is also widely known for his intense rivalry with Valentino Rossi. Between 2000 and 2005, when the two regularly competed against each other, Biaggi finished behind Rossi in the championship standings in every season, a statistic frequently cited in assessments of their rivalry. However, their rivalry unfolded against significant differences in machinery, factory support and age.

In 2000 and 2001, Biaggi rode for Yamaha, while Rossi competed on the Honda NSR500, a model that had won six consecutive championships between 1994 and 1999. Rossi's 2001 title is often cited as a satellite-team achievement, but his Nastro Azzurro Honda was effectively a factory-backed HRC operation, equipped with factory machinery and Mick Doohan's former crew led by Jeremy Burgess. Biaggi turned 30 during the 2001 season, in which he finished runner-up to Rossi.

The technical disparity became particularly pronounced in 2002, when Honda's new RC211V won 14 of the 16 races, with Biaggi claiming the remaining two victories aboard Yamaha's YZR-M1. In 2003 and 2004, Biaggi competed for the independently run Pons Honda team. Winning a championship with an independent team has been exceptionally rare: since the introduction of the MotoGP class in 2002, only Jorge Martín has achieved the feat, riding for Pramac Ducati in 2024.

Rossi's move to Yamaha in 2004 and subsequent championship victory were widely seen as confirming his status as one of the sport's greatest riders. However, his principal rivals, Biaggi and Sete Gibernau, both competed for satellite Honda teams, while Rossi rode for the factory Yamaha team, bringing Burgess and three other members of his former Honda crew with him. Biaggi turned 33 during that season, an age at which no rider have ever won a MotoGP title. He finally joined the factory Repsol Honda team in 2005, but finished fifth without a victory. Biaggi was already 34 years old. For comparison, Rossi won his final title at 30 in 2009, while Marc Márquez became the oldest champion of the MotoGP era at 32 in 2025.

Biaggi-Rossi rivalry produced several notable on-track contests across multiple seasons. In 2001, they were involved in significant battles at the Catalan motorcycle Grand Prix and the Dutch TT, as well as in a closely contested race at Phillip Island. The rivalry resumed in later years with further encounters at Welkom and Sachsenring in 2004, followed by another prominent duel at the Mugello Circuit in 2005.

During his rivalry with Valentino Rossi, Biaggi was frequently subjected to harsh and often partisan media coverage, particularly in the Italian press. Television interviews and post-race commentary regularly adopted a confrontational tone towards him, while comparable performances by favoured riders were framed more leniently. In retrospect, this treatment has been widely criticised as narrative-driven and unbalanced.

Biaggi was engaged to Miss Italia 2002 winner and TV personality Eleonora Pedron; together they have a daughter and a son. They split in September 2015.

== Career statistics ==
=== Grand Prix motorcycle racing ===
==== By season ====
All stats according to MotoGP.com

Season	Class	Motorcycle	Team	Race	Win	Podium	Pole	FLap	Pts	Plcd
1991	250cc	Aprilia RSV250		4	0	0	0	0	7	27th
1992	250cc	Aprilia RSV250	Telkor Valesi Racing	12	1	5	4	1	78	5th
1993	250cc	Honda NSR250	Rothmans Kanemoto	14	1	5	2	1	142	4th
1994	250cc	Aprilia RSV250	Chesterfield Aprilia	14	5	10	7	8	234	**1st**
1995	250cc	Aprilia RSV250	Chesterfield Aprilia	13	8	12	9	7	283	**1st**
1996	250cc	Aprilia RSV250	Chesterfield Aprilia	15	9	11	8	9	274	**1st**
1997	250cc	Honda NSR250	Marlboro Kanemoto	15	5	10	3	2	250	**1st**
1998	500cc	Honda NSR500	Marlboro Kanemoto	14	2	8	2	2	208	**2nd**
1999	500cc	Yamaha YZR500	Marlboro Yamaha	16	1	7	1	1	194	4th
2000	500cc	Yamaha YZR500	Marlboro Yamaha	16	2	4	5	3	170	**3rd**
2001	500cc	Yamaha YZR500	Marlboro Yamaha	16	3	9	7	2	219	**2nd**
2002	MotoGP	Yamaha YZR-M1	Marlboro Yamaha	16	2	8	4	1	215	**2nd**
2003	MotoGP	Honda RC211V	Camel Pramac Pons	16	2	9	3	1	228	**3rd**
2004	MotoGP	Honda RC211V	Camel Honda	16	1	9	1	3	217	**3rd**
2005	MotoGP	Honda RC211V	Repsol Honda	17	0	4	0	1	173	5th
Total				**214**	**42**	**111**	**56**	**42**	**2892**	

==== Races by year ====
(key) (Races in bold indicate pole position, races in italics indicate fastest lap)

Year	Class	Bike	1	2	3	4	5	6	7	8	9	10	11	12	13	14	15	16	17	Pos	Pts
1991	250cc	Aprilia	JPN	AUS	USA	SPA	ITA	GER	AUT	EUR; Ret	NED	FRA; 13	GBR; Ret	RSM; 12	CZE	VDM	MAL			27th	7
1992	250cc	Aprilia	JPN; Ret	AUS; 8	MAL; Ret	SPA; 10	ITA; 3	**EUR**; 3	**GER**; 2	**NED**; Ret	HUN; Ret	FRA; DNS	GBR; Ret	**BRA**; 2	RSA; 1					5th	78
1993	250cc	Honda	AUS; 3	MAL; 17	JPN; Ret	SPA; 2	AUT; 5	GER; 4	NED; Ret	**EUR**; 1	RSM; 5	GBR; 6	CZE; 2	**ITA**; Ret	USA; Ret	FIM; 3				4th	142
1994	250cc	Aprilia	AUS; 1	**MAL**; 1	**JPN**; 4	SPA; Ret	**AUT**; 2	GER; 2	**NED**; 1	**ITA**; Ret	FRA; 3	GBR; Ret	**CZE**; 1	USA; 2	ARG; 2	**EUR**; 1				**1st**	**234**
1995	250cc	Aprilia	**AUS**; 3	**MAL**; 1	JPN; 9	SPA; 2	**GER**; 1	**ITA**; 1	**NED**; 1	**FRA**; 2	**GBR**; 1	**CZE**; 1	**BRA**; 2	ARG; 1	EUR; 1					**1st**	**283**
1996	250cc	Aprilia	**MAL**; 1	INA; 2	JPN; 1	**SPA**; 1	**ITA**; 1	**FRA**; 1	NED; 3	GER; 4	GBR; 1	AUT; Ret	**CZE**; 1	**IMO**; Ret	**CAT**; 1	BRA; Ret	**AUS**; 1			**1st**	**274**
1997	250cc	Honda	**MAL**; 1	JPN; 7	SPA; 3	ITA; 1	AUT; 3	FRA; 2	NED; DSQ	IMO; 1	GER; 4	BRA; 5	GBR; Ret	CZE; 1	CAT; 2	**INA**; 1	**AUS**; 2			**1st**	**250**
1998	500cc	Honda	**JPN**; 1	MAL; 3	SPA; 3	ITA; 2	FRA; 5	MAD; 6	NED; 2	GBR; 6	**GER**; 2	CZE; 1	IMO; 3	CAT; DSQ	AUS; 8	ARG; 5				**2nd**	**208**
1999	500cc	Yamaha	MAL; Ret	JPN; 9	SPA; 2	**FRA**; Ret	ITA; 2	CAT; Ret	NED; 5	GBR; 4	GER; Ret	CZE; 4	IMO; 3	VAL; 7	AUS; 2	RSA; 1	BRA; 2	ARG; 2		4th	194
2000	500cc	Yamaha	RSA; Ret	MAL; 4	JPN; Ret	**SPA**; Ret	**FRA**; Ret	ITA; 9	CAT; 5	NED; 4	GBR; 9	GER; 4	**CZE**; 1	POR; 4	VAL; 3	**BRA**; 5	**PAC**; 3	AUS; 1		**3rd**	**170**
2001	500cc	Yamaha	JPN; 3	RSA; 8	SPA; 11	**FRA**; 1	ITA; 3	CAT; 2	NED; 1	**GBR**; 2	**GER**; 1	**CZE**; 10	**POR**; 5	**VAL**; 10	PAC; Ret	**AUS**; 2	MAL; Ret	BRA; 3		**2nd**	**219**
2002	MotoGP	Yamaha	JPN; Ret	RSA; 9	SPA; DSQ	FRA; 3	ITA; 2	**CAT**; 4	NED; 4	GBR; 2	GER; 2	**CZE**; 1	POR; 6	**BRA**; 2	PAC; Ret	MAL; 1	AUS; 6	**VAL**; 3		**2nd**	**215**
2003	MotoGP	Honda	JPN; 2	RSA; 3	SPA; 2	FRA; 5	ITA; 3	CAT; 14	NED; 2	**GBR**; 1	**GER**; Ret	CZE; 5	POR; 2	BRA; 4	**PAC**; 1	MAL; 3	AUS; 17	VAL; 4		**3rd**	**228**
2004	MotoGP	Honda	RSA; 2	SPA; 2	FRA; 3	ITA; 3	CAT; 8	NED; 4	BRA; 2	**GER**; 1	GBR; 12	CZE; 3	POR; Ret	JPN; Ret	QAT; 6	MAL; 2	AUS; 7	VAL; 2		**3rd**	**217**
2005	MotoGP	Honda	SPA; 7	POR; 3	CHN; 5	FRA; 5	ITA; 2	CAT; 6	NED; 6	USA; 4	GBR; Ret	GER; 4	CZE; 3	JPN; 2	MAL; 6	QAT; Ret	AUS; Ret	TUR; 12	VAL; 6	5th	173

=== Superbike World Championship ===
==== By season ====
Season	Class	Motorcycle	Team	Race	Win	Podium	Pole	FLap	Pts	Plcd
2007	SBK	Suzuki GSX-R1000	Alstare Suzuki	25	3	17	0	5	397	**3rd**
2008	SBK	Ducati 1098 RS	Sterilgarda Go Eleven	28	0	7	0	1	238	7th
2009	SBK	Aprilia RSV4	Aprilia Racing	28	1	9	0	1	319	4th
2010	SBK	Aprilia RSV4	Aprilia Alitalia Racing	26	10	14	4	2	451	**1st**
2011	SBK	Aprilia RSV4	Aprilia Alitalia Racing	21	2	12	4	5	303	**3rd**
2012	SBK	Aprilia RSV4	Aprilia Racing	27	5	11	2	5	358	**1st**
2015	SBK	Aprilia RSV4	Aprilia Racing	4	0	1	0	0	36	20th
Total				**157**	**21**	**71**	**10**	**19**	**2102**	

==== Races by year ====
(key) (Races in bold indicate pole position, races in italics indicate fastest lap)

Year	Bike	1		2		3		4		5		6		7		8		9		10		11		12		13		14		Pos	Pts
Year	Bike	R1	R2	R1	R2	R1	R2	R1	R2	R1	R2	R1	R2	R1	R2	R1	R2	R1	R2	R1	R2	R1	R2	R1	R2	R1	R2	R1	R2	Pos	Pts
2007	Suzuki	QAT; 1	QAT; 2	AUS; 3	AUS; 4	EUR; 3	EUR; 2	SPA; 8	SPA; 2	NED; 6	NED; 3	ITA; 3	ITA; 5	GBR; 6	GBR; C	SMR; Ret	SMR; 3	CZE; 2	CZE; 1	GBR; 3	GBR; 8	GER; 2	GER; 3	ITA; 1	ITA; 2	FRA; 6	FRA; 2			**3rd**	**397**
2008	Ducati	QAT; 2	QAT; 3	AUS; Ret	AUS; Ret	SPA; 16	SPA; 8	NED; 10	NED; 12	ITA; 5	ITA; Ret	USA; 9	USA; 4	GER; 13	GER; 7	SMR; Ret	SMR; 2	CZE; 4	CZE; 3	GBR; 3	GBR; 12	EUR; 3	EUR; 6	ITA; 2	ITA; Ret	FRA; 4	FRA; 6	POR; Ret	POR; 13	7th	238
2009	Aprilia	AUS; 11	AUS; 15	QAT; 3	QAT; 3	SPA; 8	SPA; 8	NED; 5	NED; Ret	ITA; 11	ITA; 5	RSA; 5	RSA; 5	USA; 6	USA; 4	SMR; 13	SMR; 10	GBR; 2	GBR; 21	CZE; 1	CZE; 2	GER; 5	GER; 4	ITA; 2	ITA; 4	FRA; 3	FRA; 2	POR; 3	POR; 6	4th	319
2010	Aprilia	AUS; 5	AUS; 8	POR; 1	POR; 1	SPA; 2	SPA; 3	NED; 6	NED; 4	**ITA**; 1	**ITA**; 1	RSA; 4	RSA; 3	USA; 1	USA; 1	SMR; 1	SMR; 1	CZE; 2	CZE; 1	GBR; 5	GBR; 6	**GER**; 4	**GER**; 5	ITA; 11	ITA; 5	FRA; 4	FRA; 1			**1st**	**451**
2011	Aprilia	AUS; 2	AUS; 2	EUR; 7	EUR; DSQ	NED; 2	NED; 2	**ITA**; 2	**ITA**; 8	USA; Ret	USA; 3	SMR; 2	SMR; 2	SPA; 2	SPA; 1	**CZE**; 2	**CZE**; 1	GBR; 11	GBR; 4	GER; DNS	GER; DNS	ITA	ITA	FRA	FRA	POR; 4	POR; 7			**3rd**	**303**
2012	Aprilia	AUS; 1	AUS; 2	ITA; 4	ITA; 4	NED; 4	NED; 8	ITA; C	ITA; 5	EUR; 5	EUR; 2	USA; 3	USA; 3	SMR; 1	SMR; 1	SPA; 1	SPA; 4	CZE; 6	CZE; 4	GBR; Ret	GBR; 11	RUS; 3	RUS; Ret	**GER**; 1	**GER**; 13	POR; 4	POR; 3	FRA; Ret	FRA; 5	**1st**	**358**
2015	Aprilia	AUS	AUS	THA	THA	SPA	SPA	NED	NED	ITA	ITA	GBR	GBR	POR	POR	SMR; 6	SMR; 6	USA	USA	MAL; 3	MAL; Ret	SPA	SPA	FRA	FRA	QAT	QAT			20th	36

== Bibliography ==
- Biaggi, Max; Scalera, Paolo (29 October 2014). Ol3 Oltre. Nelle pieghe della mia vita (in Italian). Rizzoli Libri. ISBN 978-8817076159.
