= A Bramble House Christmas =

- Film poster
- Genre: Romantic Drama
- Written by: Jamie Pachino
- Directed by: Steven R. Monroe
- Starring: Autumn Reeser; David Haydn-Jones; Liam Hughes; Teryl Rothery
- Countries of origin: United States; Canada
- Original language: English

Production
- Running time: 84 minutes
- Production company: 4 Ever Christmas Productions

Original release
- Network: Hallmark Movies & Mysteries
- Release: November 19, 2017

A Bramble House Christmas is a 2017 American-Canadian romantic drama. It was directed by Steven R. Monroe and starred Autumn Reeser and David Haydn-Jones. It premiered on Hallmark Movies & Mysteries on November 19, 2017.

== Plot ==
When a terminally ill patient leaves his nurse (Willa) $100,000 in his will, the family gets suspicious. Finn, the man's son, travels to Bramble, Oregon, to investigate. He meets Willa in the B&B where she and her son are spending Christmas. And nothing is what Finn had thought...

== Cast ==
- Autumn Reeser as Willa Fairchild
- David Haydn-Jones as Finn Conrad
- Liam Hughes as Scout Fairchild
- Teryl Rothery as Mable Bramble
- Andrew Airlie as Ken
- Hilary Jardine as Sage
- Julia Benson as Molly
- Lyla Marlow as Savannah

== Production ==
The film was shot during three weeks in Vancouver, British Columbia, in July 2017.

== Development ==
Through Screenwriting Staffing’s script search platform, founded by Jacob N. Stuart, Shelley Hack, Senior Vice President of Development at Smash Media, purchased A Bramble House Christmas from author CJ Carmichael, based on a pitch by Tawny Stokes.
