= Tinker Tenor Doctor Spy =

- Star Trek: Voyager episode
- Episode no.: Season 6 Episode 4
- Directed by: John Bruno
- Story by: Bill Vallely
- Teleplay by: Joe Menosky
- Production code: 224
- Original air date: October 13, 1999

Guest appearances
- Jay Leggett - Phlox; Googy Gress - Overlooker; Robert Greenberg - Devro

Episode chronology
← Previous "Barge of the Dead"	Next → "Alice"
- Star Trek: Voyager season 6

"Tinker Tenor Doctor Spy" is the 124th episode of the science fiction television series Star Trek: Voyager, the fourth episode of the sixth season. The title is a parody of the famous 1974 novel Tinker Tailor Soldier Spy by John le Carré.

In this EMH-centric episode, the fictional USS Voyager spacecraft, lost on the wrong side of the Galaxy, has a run in with some mysterious aliens.

The episode's story was written by the cartoonist Bill Vallely, and is noted for its comedic elements.

== Plot ==
The Doctor (Robert Picardo) asks Captain Kathryn Janeway (Kate Mulgrew) to alter his program to allow him to captain the ship if an emergency occurs. Janeway refuses the request. Despite this, the Doctor alters his own sub-routines, allowing him to daydream instead. Among other numerous ego-fulfilling fantasies, the daydreams include one where he becomes the "Emergency Command Hologram" and defeats an attacking alien vessel using a fictional photonic cannon. When the Doctor finds that his daydreams are occurring when he doesn't want them to, a side effect of his faulty self-programming, the crew disables the new routines.

Meanwhile, undetected by Voyager, the crew of an observation ship of the piratical Hierarchy species has been monitoring Voyager's passage through an innoucuous nebula. As they have done with other ships Hierarchy determines whether there is any value in the ships, and if so, attacks them. Unable to scan Voyager by normal means, Hierarchy crewman Phlox (Note: Not to be confused with the character Doctor Phlox from Star Trek: Enterprise.) instead uses a "microscopic tunneling scan". As it happens, this latches onto the Doctor's program, specifically his fantasies. Phlox soon realizes his mistake, but the attack on Voyager for its anti-matter reserve, based on his wildly erroneous report, has already been scheduled. The Hierarchy will severely punish him, so Phlox somehow needs it to fail.

Phlox hacks into and reactivates the Doctor's daydreaming program, which allows them to communicate. Phlox explains the bizarre situation to the Doctor, who in turn reports to Janeway. As the very real Hierarchy ships approach, Janeway temporarily turns the Doctor into the Emergency Command Hologram; the double deception is now complete. The Doctor (less confident in reality than in his daydreams), is nonetheless able to bluff with his "photonic cannon" and the Hierarchy quickly retreats; both the Doctor's and Phlox's purposes have been served. Janeway commends the Doctor for his performance and arranges a team to evaluate the prospects of putting him charge of the ship under emergency situations.

== Production ==
The episode was originally titled "The Secret Life of Neelix" and was intended to be a story about when Neelix's daydreams take on a life of their own when aliens become involved. However, it was shifted around and rewritten to become a story involving the more staid Doctor. The premise is based on the short story "The Secret Life of Walter Mitty" by James Thurber in which Walter Mitty daydreams heroic adventures while running an errand for his wife. The title of the episode itself is a reference to the classic 1974 spy novel Tinker Tailor Soldier Spy by John le Carré.

Writer Joe Menosky described the episode as "five days of scriptwriting paradise" because "the story itself becomes your friend and collaborator; it is rich enough to support you and keep feeding you ideas as you execute the script". During the writing of the script, Menosky asked actor Robert Picardo for "a list of what the Doctor's fantasies might be. Needless to say, a life drawing of Seven of Nine was the first suggestion [Picardo] made".

Actor Robert Picardo described the filming of the episode as "the most fun I've had in shooting the entire series ... It was great fun and one of our most successful outings at humor on our show".

== Reception ==
The episode is a significant departure from typical Voyager episodes due to the story's extensive use of comedic elements, making it a favorite among many viewers. It has been cited as "most entertaining episode of the season to date, and a Voyager classic". In 2019, CBR ranked this the 15th best holodeck-themed episode of all Star Trek franchise episodes up to that time.

The Hollywood Reporter rated "Tinker Tenor Doctor Spy" the seventh best episode of Star Trek: Voyager.

In 2009, Time rated the episode as one of the top ten moments of Star Trek overall (including film) and the only Star Trek: Voyager episode in their ranking.

In 2020, SyFy Wire ranked this episode the eleventh best episode of Star Trek: Voyager.

Jammer's Reviews gave it 3.5 out of 4 stars and called it "A pleasant comic gem".

In 2020, ScreenRant said that this was the ninth best episode of Star Trek: Voyager, based on an IMDB rating of 8.6 out of 10.

== Releases ==
This episode was released as part of a Season 6 DVD boxset on December 7, 2004.

== See also ==
- AI agent
- Artificial consciousness
  - Simulated consciousness in fiction
- "Renaissance Man" (Star Trek: Voyager) & The Void, episodes where species of the Hierarchy reappear
