= Prime Directive =

Fictional Starfleet rule in Star Trek

In the fictional universe of Star Trek, the Prime Directive (also known as "Starfleet General Order 1" and the "non-interference directive") is a guiding principle of Starfleet that prohibits its members from interfering with the natural development of alien civilizations. Its stated aim is to protect unprepared civilizations from the danger of starship crews introducing advanced technology, knowledge, and values before they are ready. Since its introduction in the first season of the original Star Trek series, the directive has been featured in many Star Trek episodes as part of a moral question over how best to establish diplomatic relations with new alien worlds.

== The Prime Directive ==
The Prime Directive is one of many guidelines for Starfleet's mandate to explore the galaxy and "seek out new life and new civilizations." Although the concept of the Prime Directive has been alluded to and paraphrased by many Star Trek characters during the television series and feature films, the text of the directive was only revealed to viewers in 2021 during the Star Trek: Prodigy episode "First Con-Tact" set in 2383. Two sections of the text were shown, and are as follows:

Section 1:

Starfleet crew will obey the following with any civilization that has not achieved a commensurate level of technological and/or societal development as described in Appendix 1.

a) No identification of self or mission.

b) No interference with the social, cultural, or technological development of said planet.

c) No reference to space, other worlds, or advanced civilizations.

d) The exception to this is if said society has already been exposed to the concepts listed herein. However, in that instance, section 2 applies.

Section 2:

If said species has achieved the commensurate level of technological and/or societal development as described in Appendix 1, or has been exposed to the concepts listed in section 1, no Starfleet crew person will engage with said society or species without first gathering extensive information on the specific traditions, laws, and culture of that species civilization. Then Starfleet crew will obey the following.

a) If engaged with diplomatic relations with said culture, will stay within the confines of said culture's restrictions.

b) No interference with the social development of said planet.

The Prime Directive was frequently applied to less developed planets which had not yet discovered warp travel or subspace communication technology. The second section of Prime Directive was also applied to advanced civilizations that already knew of life on other worlds but were either independent or protected by empires outside the Federation's jurisdiction. First contact could be made by the Federation with alien worlds that had either discovered warp or were on the verge of it, or with highly advanced civilizations that simply hadn't ventured into space yet. In those cases, the Prime Directive was used as a general policy to not disrupt or interfere with their culture when establishing peaceful diplomatic relations.

Consequences for violating the Prime Directive could range from a stern reprimand to a demotion, depending on the severity of the infraction. However, enforcement of these rules – and interpretations of the Prime Directive itself – varied greatly and were at the discretion of the commanding officer. In many instances, prominent Starfleet personnel, like captains James T. Kirk, Jean-Luc Picard, Kathryn Janeway and Benjamin Sisko, willingly broke the Prime Directive but faced no real punishment or consequence for doing so.

However, the Prime Directive is not absolute. In the 24th century, a top secret Starfleet regulation, The Omega Directive, an informal "General Order Zero", allows Starfleet personnel to ignore all other directives and regulations, including the Prime Directive, if doing so is necessary to destroy any Omega molecules a ship or crew may have detected.

== Creation and evolution ==
Creation of the Prime Directive is generally credited to Original Series producer Gene L. Coon. Later writers have suggested that the Prime Directive was influenced by the Vietnam War or designed to show a civilization that had evolved beyond colonialism. This would have been consistent with Coon and Star Trek creator Gene Roddenberry's political outlooks, but the notion of science fictional first contact and its possible harms already had a decades-long history by 1966.

=== Notable on-screen references ===
==== The Original Series ====
- The first filmed reference to the Prime Directive occurs in the first season TOS episode "The Return of the Archons" (1966), when Spock begins to caution Captain Kirk of the starship Enterprise when he proposes to destroy a computer controlling an entire civilization. Kirk interrupts him after Spock says, "Captain, our Prime Directive of non-interference" with, "That refers to a living, growing culture..." Later, Kirk argues the computer into self-destruction and leaves behind a team of sociologists to help restore the society to a "human" form.
- In the second-season episode "The Apple", Spock says of Kirk's plan to destroy Vaal, "If we do what it seems we must, in my opinion, it will be in direct violation of the non-interference directive."
- In the second-season episode "A Piece of the Action", Kirk, briefing Spock and McCoy before beaming down on possible interference 100 years earlier by the Federation ship, the Horizon, Kirk explicitly states, "the contact came before the non-interference directive".
- In the second-season episode "A Private Little War", two different factions on a planet were at war with each other and it is discovered that the Klingons were furnishing one faction with advanced weapons. Kirk responded by arming the other faction with the same weapons. This resulted in an arms race on that world, as a fictionalized parallel to the then-current Cold War arms race, in which the United States often armed one side of a dispute and the Soviet Union armed the other.
  - In a similar storyline on TNG, "Too Short a Season", a Starfleet admiral admits he interpreted the Prime Directive to mean equally arming two different factions on a planet, intended to reach a stalemate, but which resulted in 40 years of war.
- In the second-season episode "Patterns of Force," Federation cultural observer and historian John Gill created a regime based on Nazi Germany on a primitive planet in an effort to create a society which combined the high efficiency of a fascist dictatorship with a more benign philosophy. In doing so, he contaminated the normal and healthy development of the planet's culture, with disastrous effects; the regime adopts the same racial supremacist and genocidal ideologies of the original. Eventually, this leaves investigating Starfleet officers with no other option but to arrange the overthrow of the government in order to mitigate the harm of Gill's interference.
- In the second-season episode "The Omega Glory", after finding out that Captain Tracy may have violated the Prime Directive, Captain Kirk states, "A starship captain's most solemn oath is that he will give his life, even his entire crew, rather than violate the Prime Directive."
- In the second-season episode "Bread and Circuses", the crew discusses that the Prime Directive is in effect, saying, "No identification of self or mission. No interference with the social development of said planet. No references to space, or the fact that there are other worlds, or more advanced civilizations."

==== The Next Generation ====
- In the Star Trek: The Next Generation (TNG) first-season episode "Symbiosis", Captain Jean-Luc Picard of the starship Enterprise-D states that, "The Prime Directive is not just a set of rules; it is a philosophy... and a very correct one. History has proven again and again that whenever mankind interferes with a less developed civilization, no matter how well-intentioned that interference may be, the results are invariably disastrous."
- In the third season episode "Who Watches the Watchers", the crew of the Enterprise expose a pre-warp civilization on Mintaka III to Federation technology. Despite an attempted mind wipe, the Mintakans remember and now revere Picard as a god. Picard intentionally breaks the Prime Directive again by beaming one of the Mintakans aboard the Enterprise and explaining they are on a starship, and not gods, showing them their world from space and encouraging them to spread the truth to the others. Eventually, he allowed himself to be shot by an arrow to prove he was mortal.
- In the fourth season episode "The Drumhead", the captain of the Enterprise is being interrogated by retired Admiral Norah Satie, who says the Prime Directive is "Starfleet General Order Number One". She claims that Picard had "violated the Prime Directive a total of nine times since you took command of the Enterprise". (To this he responds "My reports to Starfleet document the circumstances in each of those instances".)
- In the fourth season episode "First Contact", Commander Riker goes undercover to scout a pre-warp civilization that is on the verge of discovering warp technology, preparing to establish diplomatic relations. When he is captured, Captain Picard and Deanna Troi make first contact early, but Picard refuses to share Federation technology with them due to the Prime Directive. After worries of social upheaval, the alien scientists developing warp travel believe their society isn't ready for knowledge of extraterrestrial life, and they ask the Enterprise to leave without announcing their presence to the public, agreeing to delay developing warp technology until their culture is ready.
- In the seventh season episode "Homeward", it is said that Starfleet had allowed 60 races to die out rather than interfere with their fate. However, in the episodes "Homeward" and "Pen Pals", the crew debates the Prime Directive and the saving of civilizations.

==== Deep Space Nine ====
- In the Star Trek: Deep Space Nine (DS9) first season episode "Captive Pursuit", Commander Sisko references the Prime Directive as his reason for choosing not to interfere in a hunt of a member of sentient species from the Gamma Quadrant that is bred to be hunted. In the end, Sisko does allow Chief O'Brien to assist the hunted being to escape from his captors to continue the hunt.
- In the episode "The Circle", the government of the planet Bajor experiences an internal, civil war-like conflict. Starfleet Commander Benjamin Sisko's superior orders him to evacuate all Starfleet personnel from the station, noting, "The Cardassians may involve themselves in other people's civil wars, but we don't."

==== Voyager ====
- In the Star Trek: Voyager episode "The Omega Directive," an exception to the Prime Directive was introduced. Starfleet's Omega Directive authorizes a captain to take any and all means necessary to destroy Omega particles including interference with any society that creates them.
- In the episode "Infinite Regress", Naomi Wildman informs Seven of Nine that she was familiar with the Prime Directive including all 47 suborders.
- In the episode "Natural Law," Chakotay and Seven of Nine encounter a primitive culture protected by an energy barrier that they crash a shuttle into which protects the culture from the rest of the planet's more advanced inhabitants. Although the two try to avoid contact, the natives encounter and help an injured Chakotay and start mimicking the pair and collecting shuttle debris as jewellery. After Seven manages to use the shuttle's deflector to lower the barrier, Voyager is able to beam out all of the loose technology and minimize the Prime Directive violation. However, this leads to another issue when the other culture on the planet -- who have achieved spaceflight and openly engaged in friendly relations with Voyager -- seek to use the downed barrier to explore the previously blocked portion of their planet and civilize the natives. While such an idea has its benefits and detractors, Janeway cites the Prime Directive as the reason for taking down the barrier. In response, the natives knock out Voyager's transporters and actively try to force the crew to leave the deflector behind, forcing Tom Paris to destroy it with the Delta Flyer instead. However, Seven worries that as her deflector modifications were already scanned, they may be replicated in time to take down the barrier again.
- In the episode "Endgame" the Future Admiral Janeway warns the present Captain Janeway against holding on to the "Prime Directive" when the Future Janeway goes back in time to change history by having Voyager get back to Earth in only 7 years instead of 23 years.

==== Enterprise ====
- Filmed between 2001 and 2005, Star Trek: Enterprise (ENT) is a prequel to Star Trek: The Original Series (TOS), set before the implementation of the Prime Directive. The first-season episode "Dear Doctor" sees the ship's doctor Phlox struggle with the ethics of providing a cure to a pre-warp species with a deadly disease. Captain Jonathan Archer notes that as humanity grapples with their newfound reach, they will have to develop "a doctrine, something that tells us what we can and can't do out here, should and shouldn't do."
- Additionally, the ENT episodes "Fight or Flight" and "Civilization", make reference to a Vulcan policy of non-interference, a possible model for Starfleet's Prime Directive.

==== Discovery ====
- In "New Eden", the second episode in season two of Star Trek: Discovery aired in 2019, the away party is selected and briefed to ensure that their interactions with humans from pre-warp capable Earth does not interfere with their development. The regulation is exclusively referred to as General Order 1. Captain Christopher Pike later breaks the Prime Directive to reveal the truth to one of the locals in exchange for a World War III era helmet camera, but the man promises to keep quiet about it to his people. Commander Michael Burnham argued to Pike that the helmet camera and the answers it might contain to solve the mystery, was more important than the Prime Directive, and that one would have to be sacrificed to uphold the other – and only the captain could make that choice.
- In "Whistlespeak" of season five, the Discovery encounters the Halem'nites, a pre-warp, pre-industrial society that is protected by a Denobulan weather tower which shields the only habitable part of the planet against sandstorms and generates rain. The Denobulans had installed the weather tower and four others like it in secret and masked them as mountains in order to avoid breaking the Prime Directive. However, the other four failed and the last one is failing, leading the Halemn'ites to build a whole religion around them. While Captain Michael Burnham and Lieutenant Sylvia Tilly at first discreetly infiltrate the locals, allowing Burnham to repair the tower in secret, Tilly's life is put in danger when the Halem'nites prepare to sacrifice her as part of a ritual to bring rain. Burnham expressly chooses to violate the Prime Directive to save her friend, arguing that Tilly and a local named Ravah should not suffer a pointless death and, without learning how to properly maintain the tower themselves, the Halem'nites will eventually go extinct.

==== Prodigy ====
- The villain of the first season, the Diviner, came from the future. In his original timeline the Vau N'Akat saw the arrival of a Federation ship to its planet. This divided their society between those who wanted to join the Federation and those who refused, and the ensuing civil war destroyed them. The Federation refused to take sides in the civil war. The Diviner considered it a subtle act of aggression and jumped to the past, the series' present, to destroy the Federation before it makes first contact with his people.
- In "First Con-tact," a holographic version of Kathryn Janeway informs the young crew of the USS Protostar of the Prime Directive before they attempt a first contact mission. However, captain Dal R'El is tricked by his old Ferengi mentor DaiMon Nandi, resulting in a disastrous first contact. Although the crew returns what Nandi stole, Janeway furiously berates them as not only was the Prime Directive broken, but the way that things went down will have a negative impact on any possible relations that the race that they had met will have with outsiders going forwards.
- In "All the World's a Stage," the crew of the Protostar meet a civilization, the Enderprizians, that experienced massive cultural contamination due to a visit by the USS Enterprise around a hundred years before. According to the locals' history, the Enterprise detected a danger to the Enderprizians that Ensign David Garrovick volunteered for a solo mission to address without breaking the Prime Directive. However, Garrovick crashed and was saved by the locals with his presence, technology and stories leading to them basing their whole culture around Starfleet and the Enterprise. One local, Doctor Boons (named after Leonard McCoy's nickname of Bones), reveals that Garrovick had told the people about the Prime Directive and that they weren't ready for the Federation or their technology, but the Enderprizians saw the Federation and its ideals as something to believe in. The Protostar's meeting with the Enderprizians is treated as second contact rather than a Prime Directive violation. In the season finale, an Enderprizian is seen in a Starfleet class, suggesting that they ended up making more official contact with Starfleet in the end.
- In "Brink," The Doctor mentions that sending the Protostar crew to Solum wouldn't technically violate the Prime Directive or Voyager's direct orders as the crew are not Starfleet personnel. However, when Gwyn asks to rescue her father Ilthuran -- the present day version of the Diviner -- Commander Tysess worries that doing so would be taking sides in the brewing civil war which the Prime Directive prohibits. Janeway agrees to allow the rescue, pointing out that nothing prevents them from granting Ilthuran political asylum, particularly as he is the best hope for a peaceful resolution to the conflict. While Janeway states that Starfleet will disavow their actions if they're caught, she allows Voyager to supply the crew with various technologies for their mission.
- In "Touch of Grey," despite Janeway previously declaring that the Protostar crew would be disavowed if they were caught, she personally leads Chakotay, The Doctor and Wesley Crusher to rescue them. As civil war breaks out on Solum, just like it did in the future that the Diviner came from, Gwyn asks Janeway for help in saving her homeworld which would be taking sides and thus violating the Prime Directive. Rather than staying out of it like the Federation did in the Diviner's future, Janeway instantly agrees to help, having been reminded that boldness isn't only for the young.
- In "Ouroboros, Part I," Voyager and the Protostar engage Asencia's forces to buy time for the Protostar crew to enact their plan. While the battle results in the defeat of Asencia and the favorable end of the civil war, the Federation's direct role is minimal, limited primarily to Voyager and the Protostar engaging Asencia's fleet which is in the middle of launching to attack every major Federation outpost across three quadrants. Like in "Brink," the forces sent to the ground who take direct part in Asencia's defeat are non-Starfleet personnel. In the following episode, Janeway leads official first contact between the Federation and the Vau N'Akat which Gwyn had previously tried and failed to establish.

==== Strange New Worlds ====
- In "Strange New Worlds", the first episode of season one of Star Trek: Strange New Worlds, Captain Pike reveals the Enterprise to a society that has reverse engineered a matter-anti-matter reactor as a weapon after witnessing the Battle near Xahea. However, the Federation Council could not address how the weapon was created because the Battle near Xahea was classified information, which prevented them from charging Pike with violating General Order 1. The Federation Council is also considering renaming General Order 1 as the Prime Directive, which Captain Pike says will "never stick".
- In "Among the Lotus Eaters," Pike orders the removal of a radioactive asteroid from the surface of the planet Rigel VII. Spock argues that they are violating the Prime Directive, but Pike counters that the asteroid's effects were stunting the growth of the local civilization and as such, they are merely setting things right rather than interfering which Spock concedes is a logical argument.

==== Picard ====
- In "Vox," Geordi La Forge mentions that Starfleet had raised the wrecked saucer section of the USS Enterprise-D off of the surface of Veridian III following the events of Star Trek Generations in order to avoid breaking the Prime Directive due to the pre-warp civilization living in the star system. This allowed La Forge the chance to spend twenty years secretly rebuilding the ship.

==== Films ====
- In the feature film Star Trek: Insurrection, Picard violates orders to protect the rights of a planet's population when he feels an admiral is breaking the Prime Directive.
- In the feature film Star Trek Into Darkness, Captain Kirk violates the Prime Directive by saving Spock's life while attempting to stop an active volcano that threatens the native inhabitants, and then by exposing the Enterprise to those inhabitants. As punishment for his actions, Kirk is removed from command of the Enterprise and demoted to first officer instead. Initially, his punishment was to be sent back to Starfleet Academy, but Admiral Pike intervened on Kirk's behalf. The subsequent actions of Khan Noonien Singh lead to Kirk being reinstated soon afterwards.

== Criticism ==
The Prime Directive has been criticized in-universe because of the inconsistencies in which it is applied. In the TOS episodes "Friday's Child," "For the World Is Hollow and I Have Touched the Sky," "The Cloud Minders," "The Apple," "The Return of the Archons," "Space Seed" and "A Taste of Armageddon," the crew of the Enterprise either interferes with laws or customs of alien worlds or outright colonizes an alien planet to achieve a Federation objective, to save the lives of the crew, or to better the lives of the inhabitants.

Out-of-universe criticisms focus on the above problems; that the Prime Directive is simply a plot device and is manipulated by the writers. Janet D. Stemwedel points out a potential conflict between the anti-colonialist intentions of the Federation and the "ethical project of sharing a universe" which would require "a kind of reciprocity — even if your technological attainment is quite different, it means recognizing you are owed the same moral consideration." Stemwedel writes, "If your concern is not to change the natural behavior or development of alien citizens at any cost, your best bet is to stay at home rather than to explore new worlds." Ars Technica asked lawyers to comment on the Prime Directive and other Star Trek legal issues. Criticism included interpreting the Prime Directive as a product of the Cold War environment in which Roddenberry wrote, as well as indicating that enforcement would be lacking.

== Temporal Prime Directive ==
The "Temporal Prime Directive" is a fictional guideline for time travelers (from the past or future) from interfering in the natural development of a timeline.

In the TNG episode "A Matter of Time", Picard compares the Prime Directive to a possible Temporal Prime Directive:

"Of course, you know of the Prime Directive, which tells us that we have no right to interfere with the natural evolution of alien worlds. Now I have sworn to uphold it, but nevertheless I have disregarded that directive on more than one occasion because I thought it was the right thing to do. Now, if you are holding on to some temporal equivalent of that directive, then isn't it possible that you have an occasion here to make an exception, to help me to choose, because it's the right thing to do?"

As 31st-century time traveler Daniels revealed to Captain Jonathan Archer in the Star Trek: Enterprise episode "Cold Front", as time travel technology became practical, the Temporal Accords were established sometime before the 31st century, to allow the use of time travel for the purposes of studying history, while prohibiting the use of it to alter history.

As revealed in the Star Trek: Discovery episode "Face the Strange", the Temporal Prime Directive is still in effect in the late 32nd century.

== See also ==
- Cargo cult
- Law in Star Trek
- The Songs of Distant Earth
- Cultural Relativism
- Three Laws of Robotics
- Fermi Paradox
- Zoo hypothesis
