= List of Hallmark Channel Original Movies (2020s) =

This is a list of television films produced for the cable network Hallmark Channel in the 2020s. Such films are currently called Hallmark Channel Original Movies.

== 2020 ==
=== Hallmark Channel ===
Movie	Starring	Director	Original airdate	Viewers	Ref	DVD
Winter in Vail (W)	Lacey Chabert and Tyler Hynes	Terry Ingram	January 4, 2020	2.54		Yes
Love in Winterland (W)	Italia Ricci and Chad Michael Murray	Pat Williams	January 11, 2020	2.29		Yes
Love on Iceland (W)	Kaitlin Doubleday and Colin Donnell	Clare Niederpruem	January 18, 2020	2.21		Yes
Amazing Winter Romance (W)	Jessy Schram and Marshall Williams	Jason Bourque	January 20, 2020	1.33		Yes
Hearts of Winter (W)	Jill Wagner and Victor Webster	Allan Harmon	January 25, 2020	2.35		Yes
A Valentine's Match (LEA)	Bethany Joy Lenz and Luke Macfarlane	Christie Will Wolf	February 1, 2020	2.46		Yes
Matching Hearts (LEA)	Taylor Cole and Ryan Paevey	Siobhan Devine	February 8, 2020	2.55		Yes
The Secret Ingredient (LEA)	Erin Cahill and Brendan Penny	Tibor Takács	February 15, 2020	2.26		Yes
Love in Store (LEA)	Alexandra Breckenridge and Robert Buckley	Paul Ziller	February 22, 2020	2.00		Yes
Bad Date Chronicles	Justin Kelly and Merritt Patterson	Steven R. Monroe	February 29, 2020	1.62		No
In the Key of Love	Laura Osnes and Scott Michael Foster	Clare Niederpruem	March 21, 2020	2.22		Yes
Just My Type (SF)	Bethany Joy Lenz and Brett Dalton	Paul Ziller	March 28, 2020	2.59		Yes
You're Bacon Me Crazy (SF)	Natalie Hall and Michael Rady	Allan Harmon	April 4, 2020	2.59		Yes
Fashionably Yours (SF)	Kat Graham and Kendrick Sampson	Nimisha Mukerji	April 11, 2020	1.81		Yes
Nature of Love (SF)	Emilie Ullerup and Christopher Russell	MJ Grabiak	April 18, 2020	2.27		Yes
Adventures in Love & Babysitting	Tammin Sursok and Travis Van Winkle	Savage S. Holland	April 21, 2020	0.69		No
How to Train Your Husband	Julie Gonzalo and Jonathan Chase	Sandra L. Martin	May 16, 2020	1.83		Yes
My Favorite Bachelor	Carlson Young and Aaron Jakubenko	Ron Oliver	May 21, 2020	0.66		No
Love in the Forecast (ALR)	Cindy Busby and Christopher Russell	Christie Will Wolf	June 13, 2020	2.14		Yes
Love Under the Olive Tree (ALR)	Tori Anderson and Benjamin Hollingsworth	Peter DeLuise	June 20, 2020	1.71		Yes
Romance in the Air (SN)	Cindy Busby and Torrance Coombs	Brian Brough	August 1, 2020	2.03		Yes
Love on Harbor Island (SN)	Morgan Kohan and Marcus Rosner	Lucie Guest	August 8, 2020	2.16		Yes
Wedding Every Weekend (SN)	Kimberley Sustad and Paul Campbell	Kevin Fair	August 15, 2020	2.16		Yes
Do I Say I Do?	Becca Tobin and Ryan Kelley	Kevin Connor	August 24, 2020	N/A		No
Hometown Hero	Brooke Nevin and Jake Sandvig	David S. Cass Sr.	September 10, 2020	N/A		No
Follow Me to Daisy Hills (FH)	Cindy Busby and Marshall Williams	Séan Geraughty	September 19, 2020	2.17		Yes
Falling for Look Lodge (FH)	Clark Backo and Jonathan Keltz	Maxwell McGuire	September 26, 2020	2.05		Yes
Country at Heart (FH)	Jessy Schram and Niall Matter	Bradley Walsh	October 3, 2020	2.20		Yes
My Best Friend's Bouquet (FH)	Chaley Rose and Nathan Witte	Jessica Harmon	October 10, 2020	2.02		Yes
Sweet Autumn (FH)	Nikki DeLoach and Andrew Walker	Gary Yates	October 17, 2020	2.22		Yes
Jingle Bell Bride (CtC)	Julie Gonzalo and Ronnie Rowe Jr.	Allan Harmon	October 24, 2020	2.65		Yes
Chateau Christmas (CtC)	Merritt Patterson and Luke Macfarlane	Michael Robison	October 25, 2020	2.69		Yes
One Royal Holiday (CtC)	Laura Osnes and Aaron Tveit	Dustin Rikert	October 31, 2020	3.12		Yes
On the 12th Date of Christmas (CtC)	Mallory Jansen and Tyler Hynes	Gary Yates	November 1, 2020	2.82		Yes
Never Kiss a Man in a Christmas Sweater (CtC)	Ashley Williams and Niall Matter	Allan Harmon	November 7, 2020	2.90		Yes
Christmas with the Darlings (CtC)	Katrina Law and Carlo Marks	Catherine Cyran	November 8, 2020	2.81		No
Christmas in Vienna (CtC)	Sarah Drew and Brennan Elliott	Maclain Nelson	November 14, 2020	2.93		Yes
A Timeless Christmas (CtC)	Erin Cahill and Ryan Paevey	Ron Oliver	November 15, 2020	3.38		Yes
A Nashville Christmas Carol (CtC)	Jessy Schram and Wes Brown	Dawn Wilkinson	November 21, 2020	3.16		Yes
The Christmas House (CtC)	Robert Buckley and Ana Ayora	Michael Grossman	November 22, 2020	2.33		Yes
Heart of the Holidays (CtC)	Vanessa Lengies and Corey Sevier	Corey Sevier	November 23, 2020	1.78		Yes
A Christmas Tree Grows in Colorado (CtC)	Rochelle Aytes and Mark Taylor	Jason Bourque	November 24, 2020	1.66		Yes
Good Morning Christmas! (CtC)	Alison Sweeney and Marc Blucas	Paul Ziller	November 25, 2020	2.85		Yes
Christmas by Starlight (CtC)	Kimberley Sustad and Paul Campbell	Gary Yates	November 26, 2020	3.11		Yes
Five Star Christmas (CtC)	Bethany Joy Lenz and Victor Webster	Christie Will Wolf	November 27, 2020	3.37		Yes
Christmas Waltz (CtC)	Lacey Chabert and Will Kemp	Michael Damian	November 28, 2020	3.95		Yes
If I Only Had Christmas (CtC)	Candace Cameron Bure and Warren Christie	David Weaver	November 29, 2020	3.93		Yes
Christmas in Evergreen: Bells are Ringing (CtC)	Rukiya Bernard and Antonio Cayonne	Linda-Lisa Hayter	December 5, 2020	2.48		Yes
Christmas She Wrote (CtC)	Danica McKellar and Dylan Neal	Terry Ingram	December 6, 2020	2.99		Yes
Love, Lights, Hanukkah! (CtC)	Mia Kirshner and Ben Savage	Mark Jean	December 12, 2020	2.99		Yes
Christmas Comes Twice (CtC)	Tamera Mowry-Housley and Michael Xavier	Michael Scott	December 13, 2020	2.49		Yes
A Christmas Carousel (CtC)	Rachel Boston and Neal Bledsoe	Don McCutcheon	December 19, 2020	3.14		No
Cross Country Christmas (CtC)	Rachael Leigh Cook and Greyston Holt	Catherine Cyran	December 20, 2020	3.30		Yes

(W) Winterfest, (LEA) Love Ever After, (SF) Spring Fling,(ALR) A Little Romance, (SN) Summer Nights, (FH) Fall Harvest, and (CtC) Countdown to Christmas are seasonal programming blocks.

=== Hallmark Movies & Mysteries ===
Movie	Starring	Director	Original airdate	Viewers	Ref	DVD
Crossword Mysteries: Abracadaver	Lacey Chabert and Brennan Elliott	Jonathan Wright	January 5, 2020	1.41		Yes
A Beautiful Place to Die: A Martha's Vineyard Mystery*	Jesse Metcalfe and Sarah Lind	Mark Jean	January 12, 2020	1.30		Yes
Roux the Day: A Gourmet Detective Mystery	Dylan Neal and Brooke Burns	Mark Jean	January 19, 2020	1.42		Yes
Picture Perfect Mysteries: Dead Over Diamonds	Alexa PenaVega and Carlos PenaVega	Ron Oliver	February 16, 2020	1.08		Yes
Riddled with Deceit: A Martha's Vineyard Mystery	Jesse Metcalfe and Sarah Lind	Andy Mikita	February 23, 2020	1.28		Yes
Mystery 101: An Education in Murder	Jill Wagner and Kristoffer Polaha	Michael Robison	March 29, 2020	1.25		Yes
Ruby Herring Mysteries: Prediction Murder	Taylor Cole and Stephen Huszar	Neill Fearnley	April 5, 2020	1.29		Yes
Matchmaker Mysteries: A Fatal Romance*	Danica McKellar and Victor Webster	Terry Ingram	April 25, 2020	1.05		Yes
Aurora Teagarden Mysteries: Heist and Seek	Candace Cameron Bure and Niall Matter	Peter Benson	May 17, 2020	1.56		Yes
Timeless Love	Rachel Skarsten and Brant Daugherty	Brian Brough	June 14, 2020	1.23		Yes
Midway to Love	Rachel Hendrix and Daniel Stine	Jeffrey Day	June 26, 2020	0.68		Yes
JL Family Ranch: The Wedding Gift	Jon Voight, James Caan, and Teri Polo	Sean McNamara	September 27, 2020	1.10		Yes
Follow Your Heart	Galadriel Stineman and Kevin Joy	Sandra L. Martin	October 4, 2020	1.40		Yes
Picture Perfect Mysteries: Exit Stage Death	Alexa PenaVega and Carlos PenaVega	Ron Oliver	October 11, 2020	1.08		Yes
Aurora Teagarden Mysteries: Reunited and it Feels So Deadly	Candace Cameron Bure and Niall Matter	Martin Wood	October 18, 2020	1.56		Yes
Christmas Tree Lane (MoC)	Alicia Witt and Andrew Walker	Steven R. Monroe	October 24, 2020	1.02		Yes
Deliver by Christmas (MoC)	Alvina August and Eion Bailey	Terry Ingram	October 25, 2020	1.08		Yes
Cranberry Christmas (MoC)	Nikki DeLoach and Benjamin Ayres	Linda-Lisa Hayter	October 31, 2020	1.19		Yes
Holly & Ivy (MoC)	Janel Parrish and Jeremy Jordan	Erica Dunton	November 1, 2020	0.98		Yes
The Christmas Ring (MoC)	Nazneen Contractor and David Alpay	Troy Scott	November 7, 2020	1.16		Yes
The Christmas Bow (MoC)	Lucia Micarelli and Michael Rady	Clare Niederpruem	November 8, 2020	0.91		Yes
Meet Me at Christmas (MoC)	Catherine Bell and Mark Deklin	Annie Bradley	November 14, 2020	1.33		Yes
The Christmas Doctor (MoC)	Holly Robinson Peete and Adrian Holmes	Kevin Fair	November 15, 2020	1.17		Yes
The Angel Tree (MoC)	Jill Wagner and Lucas Bryant	Jessica Harmon	November 21, 2020	1.42		Yes
A Godwink Christmas: Second Chance, First Love (MoC)	Brooke D'Orsay and Sam Page	H. Hawthorn Doyle	November 22, 2020	1.43		Yes
USS Christmas (MoC)	Jen Lilley and Trevor Donovan	Steven R. Monroe	November 28, 2020	1.70		Yes
Time for Us to Come Home for Christmas (MoC)	Lacey Chabert and Stephen Huszar	David Winning	December 5, 2020	1.90		Yes
A Little Christmas Charm (MoC)	Ashley Greene and Brendan Penny	R.C. Newey	December 6, 2020	1.39		Yes
A Glenbrooke Christmas (MoC)	Autumn Reeser and Antonio Cupo	David I. Strasser	December 12, 2020	1.79		Yes
Unlocking Christmas (MoC)	Taylor Cole and Steve Lund	Don McBrearty	December 13, 2020	1.37		Yes
Swept Up by Christmas (MoC)	Lindy Booth and Justin Bruening	Philippe Gagnon	December 19, 2020	1.30		Yes
Project Christmas Wish (MoC)	Amanda Schull and Travis Van Winkle	Jeff Beesley	December 20, 2020	1.35		Yes

(MoC) Miracles of Christmas is a seasonal programming block.
- Simultaneous premiere on HC and HMM.

== 2021 ==
=== Hallmark Channel ===
Movie	Starring	Director	Original airdate	Viewers	Ref	DVD
Taking a Shot at Love (NYNM)	Alexa PenaVega and Luke Macfarlane	Kevin Fair	January 2, 2021	2.99		Yes
A New Year's Resolution (NYNM)	Aimee Teegarden and Michael Rady	Lesley Demetriades	January 9, 2021	2.08		Yes
Two for the Win (NYNM)	Trevor Donovan and Charlotte Sullivan	Jerry Ciccoritti	January 16, 2021	2.09		Yes
A Winter Getaway (NYNM)	Nazneen Contractor and Brooks Darnell	Steven R. Monroe	January 23, 2021	2.30		Yes
Snowkissed (NYNM)	Jen Lilley and Chris McNally	Jeff Beesley	January 30, 2021	2.34		Yes
Beverly Hills Wedding (LEA)	Brooke D'Orsay and Brendan Penny	Paul Ziller	February 6, 2021	2.42		Yes
Playing Cupid (LEA)	Laura Vandervoort and Nicholas Gonzalez	David Weaver	February 13, 2021	2.23		Yes
Valentine's Again (LEA)	Nicky Whelan and Greg Vaughan	Steven R. Monroe	February 14, 2021	N/A		Yes
Mix Up in the Mediterranean (LEA)	Jeremy Jordan and Jessica Lowndes	Jonathan Wright	February 20, 2021	1.87		Yes
It Was Always You (LEA)	Erin Krakow and Tyler Hynes	Michael Robison	February 27, 2021	2.51		Yes
Fit for a Prince	Natalie Hall and Jonathan Keltz	Marita Grabiak	March 6, 2021	2.26		Yes
Chasing Waterfalls (SF)	Cindy Busby and Christopher Russell	Christie Will Wolf	March 20, 2021	2.14		Yes
Don't Go Breaking My Heart (SF)	Italia Ricci and Ryan Paevey	Terry Ingram	March 27, 2021	2.09		Yes
One Perfect Wedding (SF)	Taylor Cole and Jack Turner	Gary Yates	April 3, 2021	1.83		No
As Luck Would Have It (SF)	JoAnna Garcia Swisher and Allen Leech	Clare Niederpruem	April 10, 2021	2.16		Yes
Right in Front of Me (SF)	Janel Parrish and Marco Grazzini	Linda-Lisa Hayter	April 17, 2021	2.11		Yes
Hearts Down Under	Cindy Busby and Tim Ross	Rosie Lourde	April 24, 2021	2.14		Yes
Baby, It's Cold Inside	Jocelyn Hudon and Steve Lund	MJ Grabiak	May 8, 2021	1.62		Yes
Sweet Carolina	Lacey Chabert and Tyler Hynes	Peter Benson	May 15, 2021	2.38		Yes
You Had Me at Aloha (SN)	Pascale Hutton and Kavan Smith	John Putch	June 5, 2021	1.94		Yes
The Baker's Son (SN)	Eloise Mumford and Brant Daugherty	Mark Jean	June 12, 2021	1.82		Yes
Her Pen Pal (SN)	Mallory Jansen and Joshua Sasse	Clare Niederpruem	June 19, 2021	1.78		Yes
Sand Dollar Cove (SN)	Chad Michael Murray and Aly Michalka	Fred Gerber	June 26, 2021	1.83		Yes
Crashing Through the Snow^{†}	Amy Acker and Warren Christie	R.C. Newey	July 10, 2021	1.97		Yes
Love, for Real (SN)	Chloe Bridges and Scott Michael Foster	Maclain Nelson	July 31, 2021	1.41		Yes
The 27-Hour Day (SN)	Autumn Reeser and Andrew Walker	David Winning	August 7, 2021	1.93		Yes
Sealed with a Kiss: Wedding March 6 (SN)	Jack Wagner and Josie Bissett	David Weaver	August 14, 2021	1.65		No
A Little Daytime Drama (SN)	Jen Lilley and Ryan Paevey	Heather Hawthorn Doyle	August 21, 2021	1.66		Yes
Sweet Pecan Summer (SN)	Christine Ko and Wes Brown	Dustin Rikert	August 28, 2021	1.91		Yes
Journey of My Heart (SN)	Rhiannon Fish and Darien Martin	Lucie Guest	September 4, 2021	1.79		Yes
Roadhouse Romance (FH)	Lauren Alaina and Tyler Hynes	Paul Ziller	September 11, 2021	2.07		Yes
Raise a Glass to Love (FH)	Laura Osnes and Juan Pablo Di Pace	David Weaver	September 18, 2021	1.83		Yes
Taking the Reins (FH)	Nikki DeLoach and Scott Porter	Clare Niederpruem	September 25, 2021	1.88		Yes
Love Strikes Twice (FH)	Katie Findlay and Wyatt Nash	Jeff Beesley	October 2, 2021	1.76		Yes
South Beach Love (FH)	William Levy and Taylor Cole	Damián Romay	October 9, 2021	1.71		Yes
Advice to Love By (FH)	Erinn Westbrook and Brooks Darnell	Heather Hawthorn-Doyle	October 16, 2021	1.30		Yes
You, Me & the Christmas Trees (CtC)	Danica McKellar and Benjamin Ayres	David Winning	October 22, 2021	2.22		Yes
Boyfriends of Christmas Past (CtC)	Catherine Haena Kim and Raymond Ablack	Don McBrearty	October 23, 2021	2.03		Yes
The Santa Stakeout (CtC)	Tamera Mowry-Housley and Paul Campbell	Peter Benson	October 24, 2021	2.11		Yes
Christmas in Harmony (CtC)	Ashleigh Murray and Luke James	Rusty Cundieff	October 29, 2021	1.55		Yes
Coyote Creek Christmas (CtC)	Janel Parrish and Ryan Paevey	David I. Strasser	October 30, 2021	2.35		Yes
Christmas Sail (CtC)	Katee Sackhoff and Patrick Sabongui	Stacey N. Harding	October 31, 2021	2.10		Yes
Gingerbread Miracle (CtC)	Merritt Patterson and Jon Ecker	Michael Scott	November 5, 2021	2.00		Yes
Next Stop, Christmas (CtC)	Lyndsy Fonseca and Chandler Massey	Dustin Rikert	November 6, 2021	2.79		Yes
A Christmas Treasure (CtC)	Jordin Sparks and Michael Xavier	Michael Robison	November 7, 2021	1.73		Yes
Open by Christmas (CtC)	Alison Sweeney and Brennan Elliott	David Weaver	November 12, 2021	2.46		Yes
My Christmas Family Tree (CtC)	Aimee Teegarden and Andrew Walker	Jason Bourque	November 13, 2021	3.27		Yes
A Holiday in Harlem (CtC)	Olivia Washington and Will Adams	Keith Powell	November 14, 2021	1.34		Yes
Nantucket Noel (CtC)	Trevor Donovan and Sarah Power	Kirsten Hansen	November 19, 2021	2.14		Yes
A Christmas Together with You (CtC)	Harry Lennix, Laura Vandervoort, and Niall Matter	Kevin Fair	November 20, 2021	2.76		Yes
A Kiss Before Christmas (CtC)	James Denton and Teri Hatcher	Jeff Beesley	November 21, 2021	2.90		Yes
The Nine Kittens of Christmas (CtC)	Brandon Routh and Kimberley Sustad	David Winning	November 25, 2021	2.68		Yes
Christmas CEO (CtC)	Marisol Nichols and Paul Greene	Jonathan Wright	November 26, 2021	2.14		Yes
An Unexpected Christmas (CtC)	Bethany Joy Lenz and Tyler Hynes	Michael Robison	November 26, 2021	2.92		Yes
Making Spirits Bright (CtC)	Taylor Cole and Carlo Marks	David Bercovici-Artieda	November 27, 2021	2.08		No
Christmas at Castle Hart (CtC)	Lacey Chabert and Stuart Townsend	Stefan Scaini	November 27, 2021	3.31		Yes
Christmas in Tahoe (CtC)	Laura Osnes and Kyle Selig	Robert Lieberman	November 28, 2021	2.07		Yes
The Christmas Contest (CtC)	Candace Cameron Bure and John Brotherton	Paula Elle	November 28, 2021	2.95		Yes
Eight Gifts of Hanukkah (CtC)	Inbar Lavi and Jake Epstein	Mark Jean	December 3, 2021	1.63		Yes
A Very Merry Bridesmaid (CtC)	Emily Osment and Casey Deidrick	David I. Strasser	December 4, 2021	2.79		Yes
Sister Swap: A Hometown Holiday (CtC)	Kimberly Williams-Paisley, Mark Deklin, and Ashley Williams	Sean McNamara	December 5, 2021	2.65		Yes
A Dickens of a Holiday! (CtC)	Brooke D'Orsay and Kristoffer Polaha	Paul Ziller	December 10, 2021	2.12		Yes
A Royal Queens Christmas (CtC)	Megan Park and Julian Morris	Lee Friedlander	December 11, 2021	3.23		Yes
Sister Swap: Christmas in the City (CtC)	Ashley Williams, Keith Robinson, and Kimberly Williams-Paisley	Sean McNamara	December 12, 2021	2.07		Yes
The Christmas House 2: Deck Those Halls (CtC)	Robert Buckley and Ana Ayora	R.C. Newey	December 18, 2021	2.21		Yes
’Tis the Season to be Merry (CtC)	Rachael Leigh Cook and Travis Van Winkle	Gary Yates	December 19, 2021	2.42		Yes

(NYNM) New Year New Movies!, (LEA) Love Ever After, (SF) Spring Fling, (SN) Summer Nights, (FH) Fall Harvest, and (CtC) Countdown to Christmas are seasonal programming blocks.
† Part of Christmas in July.

=== Hallmark Movies & Mysteries ===
Movie	Starring	Director	Original airdate	Viewers	Ref	DVD
Ships in the Night: A Martha's Vineyard Mystery	Jesse Metcalfe and Sarah Lind	Mark Jean	January 17, 2021	1.23		Yes
Crossword Mysteries: Terminal Descent	Lacey Chabert and Brennan Elliott	Peter Benson	February 14, 2021	1.14		Yes
Chronicle Mysteries: Helped to Death	Alison Sweeney and Benjamin Ayres	Jason Bourque	February 21, 2021	1.17		Yes
Aurora Teagarden Mysteries: How to Con a Con	Candace Cameron Bure and Niall Matter	Tony Dean Smith	March 14, 2021	1.45		Yes
Mystery 101: Killer Timing	Jill Wagner and Kristoffer Polaha	Fred Gerber	March 21, 2021	1.49		Yes
Crossword Mysteries: Riddle Me Dead	Lacey Chabert and Brennan Elliott	David Winning	April 11, 2021	1.34		Yes
MatchMaker Mysteries: The Art of the Kill	Danica McKellar and Victor Webster	Catherine Cyran	April 18, 2021	1.27		Yes
Poisoned in Paradise: A Martha's Vineyard Mystery	Jesse Metcalfe and Sarah Lind	Mark Jean	May 16, 2021	1.16		Yes
Morning Show Mysteries: Murder Ever After	Holly Robinson Peete and Colin Lawrence	Andy Mikita	May 23, 2021	0.89		Yes
Aurora Teagarden Mysteries: Til Death Do Us Part	Candace Cameron Bure and Niall Matter	Martin Wood	June 13, 2021	1.60		Yes
To Catch a Spy	Nathalie Kelley and Colin Donnell	Jeff Beesley	June 20, 2021	1.19		No
Mystery 101: Deadly History	Jill Wagner and Kristoffer Polaha	Stacey N. Harding	August 1, 2021	1.43		Yes
Sweet Revenge: A Hannah Swensen Mystery	Alison Sweeney and Cameron Mathison	Pat Williams	August 8, 2021	1.54		Yes
Aurora Teagarden Mysteries: Honeymoon, Honeymurder	Candace Cameron Bure and Niall Matter	Martin Wood	August 22, 2021	1.90		Yes
Redemption in Cherry Springs	Rochelle Aytes and Keith Robinson	Letia Clouston	September 12, 2021	1.03		No
Finding Love in Mountain View	Danielle C. Ryan and Myko Olivier	Sandra L. Martin	September 19, 2021	1.00		Yes
Rise and Shine, Benedict Stone	Tom Everett Scott and Mía Maestro	Peter Benson	September 26, 2021	0.99		No
One Summer	Sam Page and Sarah Drew	R.C. Newey	October 3, 2021	1.03		Yes
The Vows We Keep	Fiona Gubelmann and Antonio Cayonne	Jessica Harmon	October 10, 2021	0.87		Yes
Signed, Sealed, Delivered: The Vows We Have Made	Eric Mabius and Kristin Booth	Linda-Lisa Hayter	October 17, 2021	1.37		Yes
Christmas in My Heart (MoC)	Heather Hemmens and Luke Macfarlane	Pat Kiely	October 23, 2021	1.04		Yes
The Christmas Promise (MoC)	Torrey DeVitto and Dylan Bruce	Fred Gerber	October 30, 2021	1.03		Yes
Debbie Macomber's A Mrs. Miracle Christmas (MoC)	Kaitlin Doubleday, Steve Lund, and Caroline Rhea	Ruby J. Munro	November 6, 2021	1.53		Yes
One December Night (MoC)	Eloise Mumford and Brett Dalton	Clare Niederpruem	November 13, 2021	0.97		Yes
Five More Minutes (MoC)	Nikki DeLoach and David Haydn-Jones	Linda-Lisa Hayter	November 20, 2021	1.32		Yes
Time for Them to Come Home for Christmas (MoC)	Jessy Schram and Brendan Penny	Peter Benson	November 27, 2021	1.57		Yes
Our Christmas Journey (MoC)	Holly Robinson Peete and Lyriq Bent	Kevin Fair	December 4, 2021	0.81		Yes
A Godwink Christmas: Miracle of Love (MoC)	Katherine Barrell and Alberto Frezza	Heather Hawthorn-Doyle	December 11, 2021	1.14		Yes
Christmas for Keeps (MoC)	Christa B. Allen and Ryan Rottman	Fred Gerber	December 18, 2021	0.78		Yes

(MoC) Miracles of Christmas is a seasonal programming block.

=== Hallmark Movies Now ===
Movie	Starring	Director	Original airdate	Viewers	Ref	DVD
Save the Wedding	Kasey Landoll and Travis Burns	Jake Helgren	April 1, 2021	N/A		Yes
High Flying Romance	Jessica Lowndes and Christopher Russell	Christie Will Wolf	August 2, 2021	N/A		Yes
Every Time a Bell Rings	Erin Cahill, Brittany Ishibashi, Ali Liebert, and Wes Brown	Maclain Nelson	November 18, 2021	N/A		Yes
Sugar Plum Twist	Jamie Gray Hyder and Ektor Rivera	Eric Close	December 2, 2021	N/A		Yes

== 2022 ==
=== Hallmark Channel ===
Movie	Starring	Director	Original airdate	Viewers	Ref	DVD
Where Your Heart Belongs (NYNM)	Jen Lilley and Christopher Russell	Christie Will	January 1, 2022	2.42		Yes
The Wedding Veil (NYNM)	Lacey Chabert and Kevin McGarry	Terry Ingram	January 8, 2022	3.39		Yes
The Perfect Pairing (NYNM)	Nazneen Contractor and Brennan Elliott	Don McBrearty	January 15, 2022	2.30		Yes
Don't Forget I Love You (NYNM)	Emilie Ullerup and Clayton James	Christie Will	January 22, 2022	2.24		Yes
Butlers in Love (NYNM)	Stacey Farber and Corey Cott	David Weaver	January 29, 2022	2.72		Yes
The Wedding Veil Unveiled (L)	Autumn Reeser and Paolo Bernardini	Terry Ingram	February 12, 2022	2.59		Yes
The Wedding Veil Legacy (L)	Alison Sweeney and Victor Webster	Terry Ingram	February 19, 2022	2.93		Yes
Welcome to Mama's (L)	Melanie Scrofano and Daniel di Tomasso	Allan Harmon	February 26, 2022	2.04		Yes
Feeling Butterflies	Kayla Wallace and Kevin McGarry	M.J. Grabiak	March 12, 2022	2.11		Yes
A Second Chance at Love (SiL)	Gloria Reuben and Eriq La Salle	Alfons Adetuyi	March 26, 2022	1.35		Yes
Just One Kiss (SiL)	Krysta Rodriguez and Santino Fontana	Jeff Beesley	April 2, 2022	1.45		Yes
A Royal Runaway Romance (SiL)	Philippa Northeast and Brant Daugherty	David Weaver	April 9, 2022	2.09		Yes
Love, Classified (SiL)	Melora Hardin, Arienne Mandi, and Katherine McNamara	Stacey N. Harding	April 16, 2022	1.26		Yes
A Tail of Love (SiL)	Brittany Bristow and Chris McNally	Leif Bristow	April 23, 2022	2.08		Yes
Warming Up to You	Cindy Busby and Christopher Russell	Christie Will	May 7, 2022	1.70		Yes
Road Trip Romance	Natalie Hall and Corey Sevier	Samantha Wan	May 14, 2022	1.52		Yes
Romance to the Rescue	Andrea Brooks and Marcus Rosner	Heather Hawthorn-Doyle	May 21, 2022	1.67		Yes
Hidden Gems (SN)	Hunter King and Beau Mirchoff	Maclain Nelson	June 4, 2022	1.71		Yes
Caribbean Summer (SN)	Heather Hemmens and Ser'Darius Blain	Steven R. Monroe	June 11, 2022	1.68		Yes
Moriah's Lighthouse (SN)	Rachelle Lefevre and Luke Macfarlane	Stefan Scaini	June 18, 2022	2.00		Yes
Two Tickets to Paradise (SN)	Ashley Williams and Ryan Paevey	Dustin Rikert	June 25, 2022	2.22		Yes
My Grown-Up Christmas List (CiJ)	Kayla Wallace and Kevin McGarry	Andrew Cymek	July 9, 2022	2.06		Yes
Campfire Christmas (CiJ)	Tori Anderson and Corbin Bleu	David I. Strasser	July 16, 2022	1.49		Yes
Christmas in Toyland (CiJ)	Vanessa Lengies and Jesse Hutch	Bill Corcoran	July 23, 2022	1.87		Yes
A Splash of Love	Rhiannon Fish and Benjamin Hollingsworth	Heather Hawthorn-Doyle	July 30, 2022	1.78		Yes
Love in the Limelight (FiL)	Alexa PenaVega and Carlos PenaVega	Ron Oliver	August 6, 2022	1.69		Yes
Romance in Style (FiL)	Jaicy Elliot and Benjamin Hollingsworth	Michael Robison	August 13, 2022	1.75		Yes
Dating the Delaneys (FiL)	Rachel Boston and Paul Campbell	Allan Harmon	August 20, 2022	1.96		Yes
Game, Set, Love (FiL)	Davida Williams and Richard Harmon	Jessica Harmon	August 27, 2022	1.22		Yes
Marry Me in Yosemite (FiL)	Cindy Busby and Tyler Harlow	Bruce D. Johnson	September 3, 2022	1.67		Yes
Marry Go Round (FiL)	Amanda Schull and Brennan Elliott	David Weaver	September 10, 2022	1.80		Yes
Wedding of a Lifetime (FiL)	Jonathan Bennett and Brooke D'Orsay	Anne Wheeler	September 17, 2022	1.55		Yes
Fly Away With Me (FiL)	Natalie Hall and Peter Mooney	Marita Jane Grabiak	September 24, 2022	1.51		Yes
Girlfriendship (FiL)	Tamera Mowry-Housley, Lyndie Greenwood, and Krystal Joy Brown	Keshia Knight Pulliam	October 1, 2022	1.14		Yes
Pumpkin Everything (FiL)	Taylor Cole and Corey Sevier	Jeff Beesley	October 8, 2022	1.88		Yes
Autumn in the City (FiL)	Aimee Teegarden and Evan Roderick	Michael Robison	October 15, 2022	1.72		Yes
Noel Next Door (CtC)	Natalie Hall and Corey Sevier	Maxwell McGuire	October 21, 2022	1.74		Yes
We Wish You a Married Christmas (CtC)	Marisol Nichols and Kristoffer Polaha	Paul Ziller	October 22, 2022	1.89		Yes
A Kismet Christmas (CtC)	Sarah Ramos and Carlo Marks	Mark Jean	October 23, 2022	1.70		Yes
A Cozy Christmas Inn (CtC)	Jodie Sweetin and David O'Donnell	Peter Sullivan	October 28, 2022	1.76		Yes
Jolly Good Christmas (CtC)	Reshma Shetty and Will Kemp	Jonathan Wright	October 29, 2022	2.10		Yes
Ghosts of Christmas Always (CtC)	Kim Matula and Ian Harding	R.C. Newey	October 30, 2022	1.67		Yes
A Magical Christmas Village (CtC)	Alison Sweeney and Luke Macfarlane	Jason Furukawa	November 4, 2022	2.12		Yes
Lights, Camera, Christmas! (CtC)	Kimberley Sustad and John Brotherton	David Weaver	November 5, 2022	1.92		Yes
All Saints Christmas (CtC)	Ledisi and Roger Cross	Troy Scott	November 6, 2022	1.20		Yes
In Merry Measure (CtC)	Patti Murin and Brendan Penny	Paula Elle	November 11, 2022	1.60		Yes
The Royal Nanny (CtC)	Rachel Skarsten and Dan Jeannotte	Jonathan Wright	November 12, 2022	2.57		Yes
Christmas at the Golden Dragon (CtC)	Kara Wang and Osric Chau	David Strasser	November 13, 2022	1.81		Yes
Inventing the Christmas Prince (CtC)	Tamera Mowry-Housley and Ronnie Rowe Jr.	Paul Ziller	November 18, 2022	1.46		Yes
Three Wise Men and a Baby (CtC)	Paul Campbell, Tyler Hynes, and Andrew Walker	Terry Ingram	November 19, 2022	3.63		Yes
When I Think of Christmas (CtC)	Shenae Grimes-Beech and Niall Matter	Peter Benson	November 20, 2022	1.98		Yes
My Southern Family Christmas (CtC)	Jaicy Elliot and Ryan Rottman	Emily Moss Wilson	November 24, 2022	2.19		Yes
#Xmas (CtC)	Clare Bowen and Brant Daugherty	Heather Hawthorn-Doyle	November 25, 2022	1.51		Yes
A Royal Corgi Christmas (CtC)	Hunter King and Jordan Renzo	Clare Niederpruem	November 25, 2022	1.98		Yes
A Tale of Two Christmases (CtC)	Kat Barrell, Chandler Massey, and Evan Roderick	Jason Bourque	November 26, 2022	1.71		Yes
Haul Out the Holly (CtC)	Lacey Chabert and Wes Brown	Maclain Nelson	November 26, 2022	3.29		Yes
A Christmas Cookie Catastrophe (CtC)	Rachel Boston and Victor Webster	Jeff Beesley	November 27, 2022	1.88		Yes
A Holiday Spectacular (CtC)	Ginna Claire Mason and Derek Klena	John Putch	November 27, 2022	2.43		Yes
A Big Fat Family Christmas (CtC)	Shannon Chan-Kent and Shannon Kook	Jennifer Liao	December 2, 2022	1.46		Yes
A Fabled Holiday (CtC)	Brooke D'Orsay and Ryan Paevey	Ruby Munro	December 3, 2022	2.39		Yes
Undercover Holiday (CtC)	Noemi Gonzalez and Stephen Huszar	Bradley Walsh	December 4, 2022	2.06		Yes
The Most Colorful Time of the Year (CtC)	Katrina Bowden and Christopher Russell	Maxwell McGuire	December 9, 2022	2.19		Yes
Christmas Class Reunion (CtC)	Aimee Teegarden and Tanner Novlan	Jon Rosenbaum	December 10, 2022	2.62		Yes
The Holiday Sitter (CtC)	Jonathan Bennett and George Krissa	Ali Liebert	December 11, 2022	1.45		Yes
Holiday Heritage (CtC)	Lyndie Greenwood and Brooks Darnell	Alfons Adetuyi	December 16, 2022	1.43		Yes
'Twas the Night Before Christmas (CtC)	Torrey DeVitto and Zane Holtz	Gary Yates	December 17, 2022	2.02		Yes
Hanukkah on Rye (CtC)	Yael Grobglas and Jeremy Jordan	Peter DeLuise	December 18, 2022	1.60		Yes

(NYNM) New Year New Movies!, (L) Loveuary, (SiL) Spring into Love, (SN) Summer Nights, (CiJ) Christmas in July, (FiL) Fall into Love, and (CtC) Countdown to Christmas are seasonal programming blocks.

=== Hallmark Movies & Mysteries ===
Movie	Starring	Director	Original airdate	Viewers	Ref	DVD
North to Home	Lyndsy Fonseca, Kimberley Sustad, and Erica Durance	Ali Liebert	January 9, 2022	1.00		Yes
Cut, Color, Murder	Julie Gonzalo and Ryan McPartlin	Stacey N. Harding	February 6, 2022	1.28		Yes
Aurora Teagarden Mysteries: Haunted by Murder	Candace Cameron Bure and Niall Matter	Martin Wood	February 20, 2022	1.75		Yes
The Presence of Love	Eloise Mumford and Julian Morris	Maclain Nelson	March 13, 2022	0.95		Yes
Always Amore	Autumn Reeser and Tyler Hynes	Kevin Fair	April 3, 2022	1.07		Yes
Curious Caterer: Dying for Chocolate	Nikki DeLoach and Andrew Walker	Anthony C. Metchie	April 10, 2022	1.17		Yes
Heart of the Matter	Aimee Teegarden and Gail O'Grady	Mark Jean	May 15, 2022	0.59		Yes
Rip in Time	Torrey DeVitto and Niall Matter	Jessica Harmon	May 22, 2022	1.07		Yes
Color My World With Love	Erica Durance and Benjamin Ayres	Peter Benson	June 12, 2022	1.00		Yes
14 Love Letters	Vanessa Sears and Franco Lo Presti	Amy Force	July 31, 2022	N/A		Yes
Big Sky River	Emmanuelle Vaugier and Kavan Smith	Peter Benson	August 7, 2022	0.99		Yes
The Journey Ahead	Holly Robinson Peete and Kaylee Bryant	Linda-Lisa Hayter	August 14, 2022	0.72		Yes
Groundswell	Lacey Chabert and Ektor Rivera	Lee Friedlander	August 21, 2022	1.09		Yes
Unthinkably Good Things (HM)	Karen Pittman, Erica Ash, and Joyful Drake	Terri J. Vaughn	August 28, 2022	0.40		Yes
Love's Portrait	Aubrey Reynolds and Richard McWilliams	John Lyde	September 4, 2022	0.93		No
To Her, With Love (HM)	Skye P. Marshall and Tobias Truvillion	Stan Foster	September 11, 2022	0.41		Yes
The Secrets of Bella Vista	Rachelle Lefevre and Niall Matter	Heather Hawthorn-Doyle	September 18, 2022	1.03		Yes
Francesca Quinn, PI	Mallory Jansen and Dylan Bruce	Anthony C. Metchie	September 25, 2022	0.91		Yes
Nikki & Nora: Sister Sleuths	Hunter King and Rhiannon Fish	Kevin Fair	October 2, 2022	0.73		Yes
Mid-Love Crisis	Teri Hatcher and James Tupper	Terry Ingram	October 9, 2022	0.57		Yes
Perfect Harmony	James Denton and Sherri Saum	Stefan Scaini	October 16, 2022	0.50		Yes
We Need a Little Christmas (MoC)	Erica Durance and Patrick Sabongui	Kevin Fair	October 22, 2022	0.78		Yes
Christmas Bedtime Stories (MoC)	Erin Cahill, Steve Lund, and Charlie Weber	Alysse Leite-Rogers	October 29, 2022	0.76		Yes
A Maple Valley Christmas (MoC)	Peyton List and Andrew Walker	Paul Ziller	November 5, 2022	1.04		Yes
Our Italian Christmas Memories (MoC)	Sarah Power and Beau Bridges	Catherine Cyran	November 12, 2022	0.85		Yes
Long Lost Christmas (MoC)	Taylor Cole and Benjamin Ayres	Michael Robison	November 19, 2022	0.92		Yes
Time for Him to Come Home for Christmas (MoC)	Holland Roden and Tyler Hynes	David Winning	November 26, 2022	1.16		Yes
The Holiday Stocking (MoC) (HM)	Nadine Ellis and B.J. Britt	Roger M. Bobb	December 3, 2022	0.64		Yes
The Gift of Peace (MoC) (HD)	Nikki DeLoach and Brennan Elliott	Fred Gerber	December 10, 2022	1.05		Yes
Five More Minutes: Moments Like These (MoC)	Ashley Williams and Lucas Bryant	Kevin Fair	December 17, 2022	1.04		Yes

(HM) Hallmark Mahogany are films under Hallmark's Mahogany banner. (HD) Hallmark DaySpring are films under Hallmark's DaySpring banner. (MoC) Miracles of Christmas is a seasonal programming block.

== 2023 ==
=== Hallmark Channel ===
Movie	Starring	Director	Original airdate	Viewers	Ref	DVD
The Dog Lover's Guide to Dating (NYNM)	Rebecca Dalton and Corey Sevier	Craig Pryce	January 1, 2023	1.68		Yes
The Wedding Veil Expectations (NYNM)	Lacey Chabert and Kevin McGarry	Peter Benson	January 7, 2023	2.48		Yes
The Wedding Veil Inspiration (NYNM)	Autumn Reeser and Paolo Bernardini	Terry Ingram	January 14, 2023	2.28		Yes
The Wedding Veil Journey (NYNM)	Alison Sweeney and Victor Webster	Ron Oliver	January 21, 2023	2.29		Yes
Love in Glacier National: A National Park Romance (NYNM)	Ashley Newbrough and Stephen Huszar	Christie Will	January 28, 2023	1.98		Yes
Sweeter Than Chocolate (L)	Eloise Mumford and Dan Jeannotte	David Weaver	February 4, 2023	2.06		Yes
A Paris Proposal (L)	Alexa PenaVega and Nicholas Bishop	Jessica Harmon	February 11, 2023	1.88		Yes
Welcome to Valentine (L)	Kathryn Davis and Markian Tarasiuk	Stefan Brogren	February 18, 2023	1.85		Yes
Made for Each Other (L)	Alexandra Turshen and Matt Cohen	Jeff Beesley	February 25, 2023	1.62		Yes
Game of Love	Kimberley Sustad and Brooks Darnell	Jason Bourque	March 11, 2023	1.47		Yes
A Winning Team	Nadia Hatta and Kristoffer Polaha	Jason Furukawa	March 18, 2023	1.38		Yes
A Picture of Her (SiL)	Rhiannon Fish and Tyler Hynes	Michael Robison	March 25, 2023	1.73		Yes
Love in the Maldives (SiL)	Jocelyn Hudon and Jake Manley	Colin Theys	April 1, 2023	1.38		Yes
The Professional Bridesmaid (SiL)	Hunter King and Chandler Massey	Peter Benson	April 8, 2023	1.40		Yes
The Wedding Cottage (SiL)	Erin Krakow and Brendan Penny	Terry Ingram	April 15, 2023	1.98		Yes
A Pinch of Portugal (SiL)	Heather Hemmens and Luke Mitchell	Clare Niederpruem	April 22, 2023	1.59		Yes
Hearts in the Game (SiL)	Erin Cahill and Marco Grazzini	Stacey N. Harding	April 29, 2023	1.54		Yes
When Love Springs (SiL)	Rhiannon Fish and James O’Halloran	Jo-Anne Brechin	May 6, 2023	1.38		Yes
Dream Moms	Tamera Mowry-Housley and Chelsea Hobbs	Jessica Harmon	May 13, 2023	1.18		Yes
Love in Zion National: A National Park Romance	Cindy Busby and David Gridley	Sam Irvin	May 20, 2023	1.51		Yes
Wedding Season (JW)	Stephanie Bennett and Casey Deidrick	David Weaver	June 3, 2023	1.34		Yes
Love's Greek to Me (JW)	Torrey DeVitto and Yannis Tsimitselis	Michael Robison	June 10, 2023	1.57		Yes
The Wedding Contract (JW)	Becca Tobin and Jake Epstein	Peter DeLuise	June 17, 2023	1.40		Yes
Make Me a Match (JW)	Rushi Kota and Eva Bourne	Heather Hawthorn Doyle	June 24, 2023	1.23		Yes
A Royal Christmas Crush (CiJ)	Katie Cassidy and Stephen Huszar	Marita Jane Grabiak	July 8, 2023	1.56		Yes
Take Me Back for Christmas (CiJ)	Vanessa Lengies and Corey Sevier	Corey Sevier	July 15, 2023	1.39		Yes
Aloha Heart (SN)	Taylor Cole and Kanoa Goo	Seth Jarrett	July 29, 2023	1.46		Yes
Making Waves (SN)	Holland Roden and Corey Cott	Terry Ingram	August 5, 2023	1.45		Yes
A Safari Romance (SN)	Andrew Walker and Brittany Bristow	Leif Bristow	August 12, 2023	1.50		Yes
Never Too Late to Celebrate (SN)	Alexa PenaVega and Carlos PenaVega	Felipe Rodriguez	August 19, 2023	1.37		Yes
Napa Ever After (SN) (HM)	Denise Boutté and Colin Lawrence	Alfons Adetuyi	August 26, 2023	1.09		Yes
Love in the Great Smoky Mountains: A National Park Romance (FiL)	Arielle Kebbel and Zach Roerig	Danny J. Boyle	September 2, 2023	1.49		Yes
Fourth Down and Love (FiL)	Pascale Hutton and Ryan Paevey	Allan Harmon	September 9, 2023	1.58		Yes
Notes of Autumn (FiL)	Ashley Williams and Luke Macfarlane	Troy Scott	September 16, 2023	1.49		Yes
Retreat to You (FiL)	Emilie Ullerup and Peter Mooney	Terry Ingram	September 23, 2023	1.43		Yes
A Very Venice Romance (FiL)	Stephanie Leonidas and Raniero Monaco Di Lapio	Liz Farrer	September 30, 2023	1.23		Yes
3 Bed, 2 Bath, 1 Ghost (FiL)	Julie Gonzalo and Chris McNally	Kevin Fair	October 7, 2023	2.25		Yes
Field Day (FiL)	Rachel Boston and Benjamin Ayres	David Winning	October 14, 2023	1.53		Yes
Checkin' it Twice (CtC)	Kim Matula and Kevin McGarry	Kevin Fair	October 20, 2023	1.66		Yes
Where Are You, Christmas? (CtC)	Lyndsy Fonseca and Michael Rady	Dustin Rikert	October 21, 2023	1.78		Yes
Under the Christmas Sky (CtC)	Jessica Parker Kennedy and Ryan Paevey	Seán Geraughty	October 22, 2023	1.53		Yes
Christmas by Design (CtC)	Rebecca Dalton and Jonathan Keltz	Maxwell McGuire	October 27, 2023	1.31		Yes
Mystic Christmas (CtC)	Jessy Schram and Chandler Massey	Marlo Hunter	October 28, 2023	1.72		Yes
Joyeux Noel (CtC)	Jaicy Elliot and Brant Daugherty	Jessica Harmon	October 29, 2023	1.74		Yes
Flipping for Christmas (CtC)	Ashley Newbrough and Marcus Rosner	Katherine Barrell	November 3, 2023	1.77		Yes
Never Been Chris'd (CtC)	Janel Parrish and Tyler Hynes	Jeff Beesley	November 4, 2023	1.80		Yes
The Santa Summit (CtC)	Hunter King and Benjamin Hollingsworth	Jeff Beesley	November 5, 2023	1.70		Yes
Everything Christmas (CtC)	Cindy Busby and Corey Sevier	Marni Banack	November 10, 2023	1.90		Yes
Christmas Island (CtC)	Rachel Skarsten and Andrew Walker	David Weaver	November 11, 2023	2.62		Yes
A Heidelberg Holiday (CtC)	Ginna Claire Mason and Frédéric Brossier	Maclain Nelson	November 12, 2023	2.18		Yes
Navigating Christmas (CtC)	Chelsea Hobbs and Stephen Huszar	Peter Benson	November 17, 2023	1.97		Yes
A Merry Scottish Christmas (CtC)	Lacey Chabert and Scott Wolf	Dustin Rikert	November 18, 2023	3.33		Yes
Holiday Hotline (CtC)	Emily Tennant and Niall Matter	Mark Jean	November 19, 2023	2.27		Yes
Catch Me If You Claus (CtC)	Italia Ricci and Luke Macfarlane	Bradley Walsh	November 23, 2023	2.05		Yes
Letters to Santa (CtC)	Katie Leclerc and Rafael de la Fuente	John Stimpson	November 24, 2023	1.49		Yes
Holiday Road (CtC)	Sara Canning and Warren Christie	Martin Wood	November 24, 2023	2.13		Yes
Christmas in Notting Hill (CtC)	Sarah Ramos and William Moseley	Ali Liebert	November 25, 2023	1.92		Yes
Haul Out the Holly: Lit Up (CtC)	Lacey Chabert and Wes Brown	Maclain Nelson	November 25, 2023	2.38		Yes
Our Christmas Mural (CtC)	Alex Paxton-Beesley and Dan Jeannotte	Tara Johns	November 26, 2023	1.74		Yes
A Biltmore Christmas (CtC)	Bethany Joy Lenz and Kristoffer Polaha	John Putch	November 26, 2023	3.12		Yes
My Norwegian Holiday (CtC)	Rhiannon Fish and David Elsendoorn	David Mackay	December 1, 2023	2.03		Yes
A Not So Royal Christmas (CtC)	Brooke D'Orsay and Will Kemp	Jonathan Wright	December 2, 2023	2.02		Yes
Christmas with a Kiss (CtC) (HM)	Mishael Morgan and Ronnie Rowe Jr.	Roger Bobb	December 3, 2023	1.57		Yes
Magic in Mistletoe (CtC)	Lyndie Greenwood and Paul Campbell	Paula Elle	December 8, 2023	1.85		Yes
Christmas on Cherry Lane (CtC)	Catherine Bell, Jonathan Bennett, and Erin Cahill	Gail Harvey	December 9, 2023	2.03		Yes
Round and Round (CtC)	Vic Michaelis and Bryan Greenberg	Stacey N. Harding	December 10, 2023	1.54		Yes
The Secret Gift of Christmas (CtC)	Meghan Ory and Christopher Russell	Christie Will	December 15, 2023	1.92		Yes
Sealed with a List (CtC)	Katie Findlay and Evan Roderick	Lucie Guest	December 16, 2023	2.10		Yes
Friends & Family Christmas (CtC)	Humberly González and Ali Liebert	Anne Wheeler	December 17, 2023	1.30		Yes

(NYNM) New Year New Movies!, (L) Loveuary, (SiL) Spring into Love, (JW) June Weddings, (CiJ) Christmas in July, (SN) Summer Nights, (FiL) Fall into Love, and (CtC) Countdown to Christmas are seasonal programming blocks.
(HM) Hallmark Mahogany are films under Hallmark's Mahogany banner.

=== Hallmark Movies & Mysteries ===
Movie	Starring	Director	Original airdate	Viewers	Ref	DVD
Family History Mysteries: Buried Past	Janel Parrish and Niall Matter	Jonathan Wright	January 8, 2023	1.01		No
Curious Caterer: Grilling Season	Nikki DeLoach and Andrew Walker	Paul Ziller	February 5, 2023	1.18		Yes
A Nashville Legacy (HM)	Andrea Lewis and Pooch Hall	Roger M. Bobb	February 26, 2023	0.31		Yes
Unexpected Grace	Erica Durance and Michael Rady	Linda-Lisa Hayter	March 12, 2023	0.69		No
The Cases of Mystery Lane	Aimee Garcia and Paul Campbell	Mike Rohl	March 19, 2023	0.82		Yes
The Blessing Bracelet (HD)	Amanda Schull and Carlo Marks	Michael Robison	April 9, 2023	0.66		Yes
Spring Breakthrough (HM)	Keesha Sharp and Demetrius Grosse	Mykelti Williamson	April 30, 2023	0.38		Yes
The Jane Mysteries: Inheritance Lost	Jodie Sweetin and Stephen Huszar	Marco Deufemia	May 12, 2023	0.57		Yes
Carrot Cake Murder: A Hannah Swensen Mystery	Alison Sweeney and Cameron Mathison	Pat Williams	May 19, 2023	0.79		Yes
The Dancing Detective: A Deadly Tango	Lacey Chabert and Will Kemp	Stefan Scaini	June 2, 2023	0.87		Yes
Aurora Teagarden Mysteries: Something New	Skyler Samuels and Evan Roderick	Jessica Harmon	June 9, 2023	0.74		Yes
A Lifelong Love	Andrea Brooks and Patch May	Nicholas Humphries	July 21, 2023	0.43		Yes
Big Sky River: The Bridal Path	Emmanuelle Vaugier and Kavan Smith	Peter Benson	August 11, 2023	0.52		Yes
The More Love Grows	Rachel Boston and Warren Christie	Heather Hawthorn Doyle	August 18, 2023	0.63		Yes
Guiding Emily	Sarah Drew, Antonio Cupo, and Eric McCormack	Andy Mikita	September 8, 2023	0.56		Yes
Come Fly with Me	Heather Hemmens and Niall Matter	Michael Robison	September 15, 2023	0.58		Yes
Haunted Harmony Mysteries: Murder in G Major	Tamera Mowry-Housley and Marco Grazzini	Linda-Lisa Hayter	September 22, 2023	0.79		Yes
Mystery Island	Elizabeth Henstridge and Charlie Weber	Nicholas Humphries	September 29, 2023	0.59		Yes
A Zest for Death: A Hannah Swensen Mystery	Alison Sweeney and Cameron Mathison	Shannon Kohli	October 6, 2023	0.99		Yes
Curious Caterer: Fatal Vows	Nikki Deloach and Andrew Walker	Paul Ziller	October 13, 2023	0.86		Yes
Ms. Christmas Comes to Town (MoC)	Erica Durance and Brennan Elliott	Jason Bourque	October 26, 2023	1.01		Yes
My Christmas Guide (MoC)	Amber Marshall and Ben Mehl	Maxwell McGuire	November 2, 2023	1.09		Yes
Mystery on Mistletoe Lane (MoC)	Erica Cerra and Victor Webster	Allan Harmon	November 9, 2023	1.30		Yes
A World Record Christmas (MoC)	Nikki DeLoach and Lucas Bryant	Jason Bourque	November 16, 2023	1.06		Yes
A Season for Family (MoC)	Brendan Penny and Stacey Farber	Kevin Fair	November 22, 2023	1.19		Yes
Time for Her to Come Home for Christmas (MoC)	Shenae Grimes-Beech and Chris Carmack	Ali Liebert	November 30, 2023	1.13		Yes
To All a Good Night (MoC)	Kimberley Sustad and Mark Ghanimé	Andy Mikita	December 7, 2023	1.35		Yes
Heaven Down Here (MoC)	Krystal Joy Brown and Tina Lifford	Anne Wheeler	December 14, 2023	1.38		Yes
Miracle in Bethlehem, PA (MoC) (HD)	Laura Vandervoort and Benjamin Ayres	Jeff Beesley	December 21, 2023	1.91		Yes

(HM) Hallmark Mahogany are films under Hallmark's Mahogany banner. (HD) Hallmark DaySpring are films under Hallmark's DaySpring banner. (MoC) Miracles of Christmas is a seasonal programming block.

=== Hallmark Movies Now ===
Movie	Starring	Director	Original airdate	Viewers	Ref	DVD
The Love Club: Nicole's Pen Pal	Brittany Bristow and Marcus Rosner	Jill Carter	February 2, 2023	N/A		Yes
The Love Club: Sydney's Journey	Lily Gao and Jesse Hutch	Jill Carter	February 9, 2023	N/A		Yes
The Love Club: Lauren's Dream	Chantel Riley and Andrew Bushell	Jill Carter	February 16, 2023	N/A		Yes
The Love Club: Tara's Tune	Camille Stopps and Brett Donahue	Jill Carter	February 23, 2023	N/A		Yes
Rescuing Christmas	Rachael Leigh Cook and Sam Page	Emily Moss Wilson	December 7, 2023	N/A		Yes
An Ice Palace Romance	Celeste Desjardins and Marcus Rosner	Shawna Steele	December 14, 2023	N/A		Yes

== 2024 ==
=== Hallmark Channel ===
Movie	Starring	Director	Original airdate	Viewers	Ref	DVD
Love on the Right Course (NYNM)	Ashley Newbrough and Marcus Rosner	Stefan Scaini	January 6, 2024	1.78		Yes
A Scottish Love Scheme (NYNM)	Erica Durance and Jordan Young	Heather Hawthorn Doyle	January 13, 2024	1.72		Yes
Betty's Bad Luck in Love (NYNM)	Laci J. Mailey and Marco Grazzini	Linda-Lisa Hayter	January 20, 2024	1.51		Yes
Romance with a Twist (NYNM)	Jocelyn Hudon and Olivier Renaud	Maxwell McGuire	January 27, 2024	1.85		Yes
Paging Mr. Darcy (LwJA)	Mallory Jansen and Will Kemp	Peter Wellington	February 3, 2024	1.57		Yes
Love & Jane (LwJA)	Alison Sweeney and Benjamin Ayres	David Weaver	February 10, 2024	1.49		Yes
An American in Austen (LwJA)	Eliza Bennett and Nicholas Bishop	Clare Niederpruem	February 17, 2024	1.28		Yes
A Taste of Love (LwJA)	Erin Cahill and Jesse Kove	Michael E. Brown & Conrad De La Torres III	February 19, 2024	N/A		Yes
Sense and Sensibility (LwJA) (HM)	Deborah Ayorinde and Dan Jeannotte	Roger M. Bobb	February 24, 2024	0.94		Yes
Shifting Gears (SiL)	Tyler Hynes and Katherine Barrell	Yan-Kay Crystal Lowe	March 23, 2024	1.51		Yes
An Easter Bloom (SiL) (HD)	Aimee Teegarden and Benjamin Hollingsworth	Anthony C. Metchie	March 30, 2024	1.62		Yes
Blind Date Book Club (SiL)	Erin Krakow and Robert Buckley	Peter Benson	April 6, 2024	1.65		Yes
Legend of the Lost Locket (SiL)	Natasha Burnett and Viv Leacock	Kevin Fair	April 13, 2024	1.27		Yes
Falling in Love in Niagara (SiL)	Jocelyn Hudon and Dan Jeannotte	Marita Jane Grabiak	April 20, 2024	1.80		Yes
Branching Out (SiL)	Sarah Drew and Juan Pablo Di Pace	Maclain Nelson	April 27, 2024	1.67		Yes
A Whitewater Romance (CtS)	Cindy Busby and Benjamin Hollingsworth	Jason Bourque	May 11, 2024	1.48		Yes
Everything Puppies (CtS)	Pascal Lamothe-Kipnes and Stephen Huszar	Marni Banack	May 18, 2024	1.31		Yes
For Love & Honey (PtL)	Andrew Walker and Margaret Clunie	Kevin Fair	June 1, 2024	1.46		Yes
Savoring Paris (PtL)	Bethany Joy Lenz and Stanley Weber	Clare Niederpruem	June 8, 2024	1.46		Yes
A Greek Recipe for Romance (PtL)	Danielle C. Ryan and Rafael Kariotakis	Colin Theys	June 15, 2024	1.30		Yes
Two Scoops of Italy (PtL)	Hunter King and Michele Rosiello	Roger M. Bobb	June 22, 2024	1.13		Yes
Falling Like Snowflakes (CiJ)	Rebecca Dalton and Marcus Rosner	Maxwell McGuire	June 29, 2024	1.51		Yes
A Very Vermont Christmas (CiJ)	Katie Leclerc and Ryan McPartlin	John Stimpson	July 20, 2024	1.50		Yes
Junebug (SN)	Autumn Reeser and Aaron O'Connell	David Weaver	August 3, 2024	1.22		Yes
My Dreams of You (SN)	Skyler Samuels and Kapil Talwalkar	Kevin Fair	August 10, 2024	1.07		Yes
A Costa Rican Wedding (SN)	Rhiannon Fish and Christopher Russell	Colin Theys	August 17, 2024	1.47		Yes
The Magic of Lemon Drops (SN)	Lyndsy Fonseca and Ian Harding	Maclain Nelson	August 24, 2024	1.59		Yes
Head Over Heels (SN)	Rebecca Dalton and Olivier Renaud	Samantha Wan	August 31, 2024	1.33		Yes
His & Hers (FiL)	Lacey Chabert and Brennan Elliott	Linda-Lisa Hayter	September 7, 2024	1.49		Yes
The Heiress and the Handyman (FiL)	Jodie Sweetin and Corey Sevier	Marco Deufemia	September 14, 2024	1.86		Yes
Falling Together (FiL)	Ashley Williams and Paul Campbell	Mike Rohl	September 21, 2024	1.52		Yes
The Real West (FiL)	Kimberley Sustad and Lucas Bryant	Terry Ingram	September 28, 2024	1.75		Yes
Autumn at Apple Hill (FiL)	Erin Cahill and Wes Brown	Séan Geraughty	October 5, 2024	1.70		Yes
Haunted Wedding (FiL)	Janel Parrish and Dominic Sherwood	Jeff Beesley	October 12, 2024	1.43		Yes
'Twas the Date Before Christmas (CtC)	Robert Buckley and Amy Groening	Bradley Walsh	October 18, 2024	1.19		Yes
Holiday Crashers (CtC)	Lyndsy Fonseca and Chris McNally	Michael Robison	October 19, 2024	1.55		Yes
Scouting for Christmas (CtC)	Tamera Mowry-Housley and Carlo Marks	Jason Bourque	October 20, 2024	1.13		Yes
The Christmas Charade (CtC)	Rachel Skarsten and Corey Sevier	Corey Sevier	October 26, 2024	1.46		Yes
The 5-Year Christmas Party (CtC)	Katie Findlay and Jordan Fisher	Peter Benson	October 27, 2024	1.06		Yes
A Carol for Two (CtC)	Ginna Claire Mason and Jordan Litz	Jeff Beesley	November 1, 2024	1.14		Yes
Our Holiday Story (CtC)	Nikki DeLoach and Warren Christie	Jason Bourque	November 2, 2024	1.89		Yes
Holiday Mismatch (CtC)	Caroline Rhea and Beth Broderick	Caroline Labrèche	November 3, 2024	1.53		Yes
Trivia at St. Nick's (CtC)	Tammin Sursok and Brant Daugherty	Marlo Hunter	November 8, 2024	1.10		Yes
Santa Tell Me (CtC)	Erin Krakow and Daniel Lissing	Ryan Landels	November 9, 2024	2.25		Yes
'Tis the Season to Be Irish (CtC)	Fiona Gubelmann and Eoin Macken	Lesley Demetriades	November 10, 2024	1.62		Yes
Christmas with the Singhs (CtC)	Anuja Joshi and Benjamin Hollingsworth	Panta Mosleh	November 15, 2024	1.13		Yes
Jingle Bell Run (CtC)	Ashley Williams and Andrew Walker	Lucie Guest	November 16, 2024	1.73		Yes
Confessions of a Christmas Letter (CtC)	Angela Kinsey and Alec Santos	Heather Hawthorn Doyle	November 17, 2024	0.99		Yes
Christmas On Call (CtC)	Sara Canning and Ser'Darius Blain	Jeff Beesley	November 22, 2024	1.30		Yes
Three Wiser Men and a Boy (CtC)	Paul Campbell, Tyler Hynes, Andrew Walker, and Margaret Colin	Terry Ingram	November 23, 2024	2.37		Yes
To Have and To Holiday (CtC)	Madeleine Arthur and Robert Bazzocchi	Stacey N. Harding	November 24, 2024	1.47		Yes
Debbie Macomber's Joyful Mrs. Miracle (CtC)	Rachel Boston and Pascal Lamothe-Kipnes	Peter Benson	November 28, 2024	1.36		Yes
A ’90s Christmas (CtC)	Eva Bourne and Chandler Massey	Marni Banack	November 29, 2024	N/A		Yes
Deck the Walls (CtC)	Ashley Greene and Wes Brown	Jake Van Wagoner	November 29, 2024	1.50		Yes
Believe in Christmas (CtC)	Meghan Ory and John Reardon	Christie Will	November 30, 2024	N/A		Yes
Holiday Touchdown: A Chiefs Love Story (CtC)	Hunter King and Tyler Hynes	John Putch	November 30, 2024	2.88		Yes
The Finnish Line (CtC)	Kim Matula and Beau Mirchoff	Dustin Rikert	December 1, 2024	1.13		Yes
The Christmas Quest (CtC)	Lacey Chabert and Kristoffer Polaha	Dustin Rikert	December 1, 2024	1.57		Yes
Private Princess Christmas (CtC)	Ali Skovbye and Derek Klena	Paul Ziller	December 6, 2024	1.40		Yes
Sugarplummed (CtC)	Maggie Lawson and Janel Parrish	Ryan Landels	December 7, 2024	1.76		Yes
Leah's Perfect Gift (CtC)	Emily Arlook and Evan Roderick	Peter Benson	December 8, 2024	1.47		Yes
Hanukkah on the Rocks (CtC)	Stacey Farber and Daren Kagasoff	Séan Geraughty	December 13, 2024	1.09		Yes
The Santa Class (CtC)	Kimberley Sustad and Benjamin Ayres	Lucie Guest	December 14, 2024	1.87		Yes
Following Yonder Star (CtC) (HD)	Brooke D'Orsay and John Brotherton	Jeff Beesley	December 15, 2024	1.62		Yes
Happy Howlidays (CtC)	Jessica Lowndes and Ezra Moreland	Terry Ingram	December 21, 2024	1.86		Yes

(NYNM) New Year New Movies!, (LwJA) Loveuary with Jane Austen, (SiL) Spring into Love, (CtS) Countdown to Summer, (PtL) Passport to Love, (CiJ) Christmas in July, (SN) Summer Nights, (FiL) Fall into Love, and (CtC) Countdown to Christmas are seasonal programming blocks.
(HM) Hallmark Mahogany are films under Hallmark's Mahogany banner. (HD) Hallmark DaySpring are films under Hallmark's DaySpring banner.

=== Hallmark Mystery ===
Movie	Starring	Director	Original airdate	Viewers	Ref	DVD
True Justice: Family Ties	Katherine McNamara and Markian Tarasiuk	Jonathan Wright	January 12, 2024	0.76		Yes
Gilded Newport Mysteries: Murder at the Breakers	Ali Skovbye and Danny Griffin	Terry Ingram	February 2, 2024	0.65		Yes
CrimeTime: Freefall	Lyndie Greenwood and Luke Macfarlane	Stacey N. Harding	February 23, 2024	0.53		Yes
Crimes of Fashion: Killer Clutch	Brooke D'Orsay and Gilles Marini	Felipe Rodriguez	March 15, 2024	0.43		Yes
One Bad Apple: A Hannah Swensen Mystery	Alison Sweeney and Victor Webster	Shannon Kohli	April 5, 2024	0.74		Yes
Curious Caterer: Foiled Plans	Nikki DeLoach and Andrew Walker	Paul Ziller	April 26, 2024	0.71		No
Family Practice Mysteries: Coming Home	Amanda Schull and Brendan Penny	Michael Robison	May 17, 2024	0.58		Yes
Tipline Mysteries: Dial 1 for Murder	Holland Roden and Chris McNally	Jessica Harmon & Cynde Harmon	June 7, 2024	0.65		Yes
Signed, Sealed, Delivered: A Tale of Three Letters	Eric Mabius and Kristin Booth	Linda-Lisa Hayter	July 12, 2024	N/A		Yes
Jazz Ramsey: A K-9 Mystery	Rachel Skarsten and Corey Sevier	Marco Deufemia	August 2, 2024	N/A		Yes
Nelly Knows Mysteries: A Fatal Engagement	Pascale Hutton and Kavan Smith	David I. Strasser	August 23, 2024	N/A		Yes
The Cases of Mystery Lane: Death is Listening	Aimee Garcia and Paul Campbell	Mike Rohl	September 13, 2024	N/A		Yes
A Sprinkle of Deceit: A Hannah Swensen Mystery	Alison Sweeney and Victor Webster	Kevin Leslie	October 4, 2024	0.73		No
Curious Caterer: Forbidden Fruit	Nikki DeLoach and Andrew Walker	David Winning	October 11, 2024	0.68		No
This Time Each Year (MoC)	Alison Sweeney and Niall Matter	Yan-Kay Crystal Lowe	October 24, 2024	0.64		Yes
My Sweet Austrian Holiday (MoC)	Brittany Bristow and Will Kemp	Leif Bristow	October 31, 2024	0.60		Yes
Five Gold Rings (MoC)	Holland Roden and Nolan Gerard Funk	Steven R. Monroe	November 7, 2024	0.54		No
A Reason for the Season (MoC)	Taylor Cole and Kevin McGarry	Jason Bourque	November 14, 2024	0.92		Yes
A Novel Noel (MoC)	Julie Gonzalo and Brendan Penny	Michael Robison	November 21, 2024	0.79		Yes
Christmas Under the Lights (MoC)	Heather Hemmens and Marco Grazzini	Lucie Guest	November 27, 2024	0.79		Yes
A Dance in the Snow (MoC)	Erica Cerra and Mark Ghanimé	Stefan Scaini	December 5, 2024	0.85		Yes
All I Need for Christmas (MoC)	Mallory Jansen and Dan Jeannotte	David I. Strasser	December 12, 2024	0.81		Yes
Trading Up Christmas (MoC)	Italia Ricci and Michael Xavier	Bradley Walsh	December 19, 2024	N/A		Yes

(MoC) Miracles of Christmas is a seasonal programming block.

=== Hallmark+ ===
Movie	Starring	Director	Original airdate	Viewers	Ref	DVD
Operation Nutcracker	Ashley Newbrough and Christopher Russell	David Weaver	July 1, 2024	N/A		Yes
Love on the Danube: Love Song	Nazneen Contractor and Wes Brown	Terry Ingram	September 10, 2024	N/A		Yes
The Jane Mysteries: A Deadly Prescription	Jodie Sweetin and Stephen Huszar	Marco Deufemia	September 10, 2024	N/A		Yes
Love on the Danube: Royal Getaway	Jessica Sipos and Dan Jeannotte	Norma Bailey	September 19, 2024	N/A		Yes
The Jane Mysteries: Murder at Moseby	Jodie Sweetin and Stephen Huszar	Marco Deufemia	September 19, 2024	N/A		No
Love on the Danube: Kissing Stars	Sarah Power and Brendan Penny	Peter Benson	September 26, 2024	N/A		Yes
The Jane Mysteries: Too Much to Lose	Jodie Sweetin and Stephen Huszar	Marco Deufemia	September 26, 2024	N/A		No
Aurora Teagarden Mysteries: A Lesson in Murder	Skyler Samuels and Evan Roderick	Jessica Harmon	October 3, 2024	N/A		Yes
Aurora Teagarden Mysteries: Death at the Diner	Skyler Samuels and Evan Roderick	Jessica Harmon	October 10, 2024	N/A		Yes
The Groomsmen: First Look	B.J. Britt and Heather Hemmens	Ron Oliver	October 17, 2024	N/A		Yes
The Groomsmen: Second Chances	Jonathan Bennett and Alexander Lincoln	Ron Oliver	October 24, 2024	N/A		Yes
The Groomsmen: Last Dance	Tyler Hynes and Elena Rusconi	Ron Oliver	October 31, 2024	N/A		Yes
Unwrapping Christmas: Tina's Miracle	Natalie Hall and Alec Santos	Maxwell McGuire	November 7, 2024	N/A		Yes
Unwrapping Christmas: Mia's Prince	Kathryn Davis and Nathan Witte	Amy Force	November 14, 2024	N/A		Yes
Unwrapping Christmas: Lily's Destiny	Ashley Newbrough and Torrance Coombs	Amy Force	November 21, 2024	N/A		Yes
Unwrapping Christmas: Olivia's Reunion	Cindy Busby and Jake Epstein	Maxwell McGuire	November 28, 2024	N/A		Yes
Season's Greetings from Cherry Lane	Jonathan Bennett, Corey Cott, and Sarah Dugdale	Gail Harvey	December 5, 2024	N/A		Yes
Happy Holidays from Cherry Lane	Catherine Bell, Erica Durance, and Julie Gonzalo	Gail Harvey	December 12, 2024	N/A		Yes
Deck the Halls on Cherry Lane	Erin Cahill, Brooke D'Orsay, and Chelsea Hobbs	Ali Liebert	December 19, 2024	N/A		Yes

== 2025 ==
=== Hallmark Channel ===
Movie	Starring	Director	Original airdate	Viewers	Ref	DVD
Love of the Irish (WE)	Shenae Grimes-Beech and Stephen Hagan	Ali Liebert	January 4, 2025	1.45		Yes
Polar Opposites (WE)	Rhiannon Fish and Markian Tarasiuk	Colin Theys	January 11, 2025	1.50		Yes
My Argentine Heart (WE)	Julie Gonzalo and Juan Pablo Di Pace	Terry Ingram	January 18, 2025	1.12		Yes
The Perfect Setting (WE)	Laci J. Mailey and David Elsendoorn	Jonathan Wright	January 25, 2025	1.53		Yes
An Unexpected Valentine (L)	Lacey Chabert and Robert Buckley	Michael Robison	February 1, 2025	1.80		Yes
The Wish Swap (L)	Emily Tennant and Jake Foy	David I. Strasser	February 8, 2025	1.48		No
Return to Office (L)	Janel Parrish and Scott Michael Foster	Peter Benson	February 15, 2025	1.39		Yes
Sisterhood, Inc. (L)	Rachael Leigh Cook and Leonidas Gulaptis	Lesley Demetriades	February 22, 2025	1.20		Yes
The Royal We	Mallory Jansen and Charlie Carrick	Clare Niederpruem	March 1, 2025	1.61		Yes
The Reluctant Royal	Andrew Walker and Emilie de Ravin	Kevin Fair	March 8, 2025	1.80		Yes
Royal-ish	Nichole Sakura and William Moseley	Roger M. Bobb	March 15, 2025	1.55		Yes
Hearts Around the Table: Jenna's First Love (SiL)	Ashley Newbrough, Steve Lund, and Mindy Cohn	Marco Deufemia	March 22, 2025	1.36		Yes
Hearts Around the Table: Shari's Second Act (SiL)	Mishael Morgan, Brendan Morgan, and Mindy Cohn	Marco Deufemia	March 29, 2025	1.15		Yes
Hearts Around the Table: Josh's Third Serving (SiL)	Jake Epstein, Stephanie Bennett, and Mindy Cohn	Mike Donis	April 5, 2025	1.16		Yes
Hearts Around the Table: Kiki's Fourth Ingredient (SiL)	Kathryn Davis, Torrance Coombs, and Mindy Cohn	Marco Deufemia	April 12, 2025	1.15		Yes
Journey to You (SiL) (HD)	Erin Cahill and Erik Valdez	Terry Ingram	April 19, 2025	1.04		Yes
Signed, Sealed, Delivered: To the Moon and Back	Kristin Booth and Eric Mabius	Linda-Lisa Hayter	April 26, 2025	1.11		Yes
Hats Off to Love (MM)	Ginna Claire Mason and John Clarence Stewart	Amy Barrett	May 3, 2025	1.12		Yes
Love in the Clouds (MM)	McKenzie Westmore and Paul Greene	Larry A. McLean	May 10, 2025	0.91		No
To Barcelona, with Love (PtL)	Alison Sweeney, Alejandro Tous, and Ashley Williams	Ron Oliver	June 7, 2025	1.15		Yes
To Barcelona, Forever (PtL)	Ashley Williams, Miguel Brocca, and Alison Sweeney	Ron Oliver	June 14, 2025	1.22		Yes
Villa Amore (PtL)	Eloise Mumford and Kevin McGarry	Clare Niederpruem	June 21, 2025	1.04		Yes
Pie To Die For: A Hannah Swensen Mystery	Alison Sweeney and Victor Webster	Yan-Kay Crystal Lowe	June 22, 2025	1.05		No
A Machu Picchu Proposal (PtL)	Rhiannon Fish and Alec Santos	Colin Theys	June 28, 2025	0.96		Yes
Providence Falls: Chance of a Lifetime (SN)	Katie Stevens, Lachlan Quarmby, and Evan Roderick	Lucie Guest & Siobhan Devine	August 2, 2025	0.70		Yes
Providence Falls: An Impossible Promise (SN)	Katie Stevens, Lachlan Quarmby, and Evan Roderick	Lucie Guest & Siobhan Devine	August 9, 2025	0.59		Yes
Providence Falls: Thief of Fate (SN)	Katie Stevens, Lachlan Quarmby, and Evan Roderick	Lucie Guest & Siobhan Devine	August 16, 2025	0.59		Yes
Mystery Island: Play for Keeps (SN)	Elizabeth Henstridge and Charlie Weber	Steven R. Monroe	August 17, 2025	0.35		No
Double Scoop (SN)	Taylor Cole and Ryan McPartlin	Peter Sullivan	August 23, 2025	1.08		No
Catch of the Day (SN)	Emilie Ullerup and Michael Rady	Jessica Harmon	August 30, 2025	1.11		Yes
Mystery Island: House Rules (FIL)	Elizabeth Henstridge and Charlie Weber	Clare Niederpruem	September 14, 2025	0.31		No
Adventures in Love & Birding (FIL)	Rachel Boston and Andrew Walker	Michael Robison	September 27, 2025	1.06		Yes
Home Turf (FIL)	Nikki Deloach and Warren Christie	Maclain Nelson	October 4, 2025	1.07		Yes
Haul Out the Halloween (FIL)	Lacey Chabert and Wes Brown	Maclain Nelson	October 11, 2025	1.06		No
Haunted Harmony Mysteries: Buried at C (FIL)	Tamera Mowry-Housley and Marco Grazzini	Linda-Lisa Hayter	October 12, 2025	0.48		No
A Royal Montana Christmas (CtC)	Fiona Gubelmann and Warren Christie	Peter Benson	October 18, 2025	1.20		Yes
A Christmas Angel Match (CtC)	Meghan Ory and Benjamin Ayres	Christie Will	October 19, 2025	0.90		Yes
Merry Christmas, Ted Cooper! (CtC)	Robert Buckley and Kimberley Sustad	Jason Bourque	October 25, 2025	1.21		Yes
Christmas on Duty (CtC)	Janel Parrish and Parker Young	Jake Van Wagoner	November 1, 2025	1.34		Yes
A Newport Christmas (CtC)	Ginna Claire Mason and Wes Brown	Dustin Rikert	November 2, 2025	1.08		Yes
Christmas Above the Clouds (CtC)	Erin Krakow and Tyler Hynes	Peter Benson	November 8, 2025	1.50		Yes
A Keller Christmas Vacation (CtC)	Jonathan Bennett, Brandon Routh, and Eden Sher	Maclain Nelson	November 9, 2025	0.88		Yes
Three Wisest Men (CtC)	Paul Campbell, Tyler Hynes, Andrew Walker, and Margaret Colin	Terry Ingram	November 15, 2025	1.54		Yes
Tidings for the Season (CtC)	Tamera Mowry-Housley and B. J. Britt	Linda-Lisa Hayter	November 16, 2025	0.80		Yes
Holiday Touchdown: A Bills Love Story (CtC)	Holland Roden and Matthew Daddario	Dustin Rikert	November 22, 2025	1.52		Yes
Melt My Heart This Christmas (CtC)	Laura Vandervoort and Stephen Huszar	Amy Force	November 23, 2025	1.23		Yes
We Met in December (CtC)	Autumn Reeser and Niall Matter	Jonathan Wright	November 27, 2025	1.27		Yes
The Snow Must Go On (CtC)	Heather Hemmens and Corey Cott	Jeff Beesley	November 28, 2025	N/A		Yes
The More the Merrier (CtC)	Rachel Boston and Brendan Penny	Peter Benson	November 28, 2025	1.77		Yes
An Alpine Holiday (CtC)	Ashley Williams, Laci J. Mailey, and Julien Samani	Lucie Guest	November 29, 2025	N/A		Yes
A Grand Ole Opry Christmas (CtC)	Nikki Deloach and Kristoffer Polaha	Clare Niederpruem	November 29, 2025	1.74		Yes
The Christmas Cup (CtC)	Rhiannon Fish and Ben Rosenbaum	Robin Dunne	November 30, 2025	0.98		Yes
Christmas at the Catnip Café (CtC)	Erin Cahill and Paul Campbell	Lucie Guest	November 30, 2025	1.36		Yes
She's Making a List (CtC)	Lacey Chabert and Andrew Walker	Stacey N. Harding	December 6, 2025	1.62		Yes
Single on the 25th (CtC)	Lyndsy Fonseca and Daniel Lissing	Jonathan Wright	December 7, 2025	1.27		Yes
A Suite Holiday Romance (CtC)	Jessy Schram and Dominic Sherwood	Jeff Beesley	December 13, 2025	1.26		Yes
Oy to the World! (CtC)	Brooke D'Orsay and Jake Epstein	Paula Elle	December 14, 2025	1.36		
A Make Or Break Holiday (CtC)	Hunter King and Evan Roderick	Martin Wood	December 20, 2025	N/A		Yes
The Christmas Baby (CtC)	Ali Liebert and Katherine Barrell	Eva Tavares	December 21, 2025	1.17		

WE (Winter Escape), L (Loveuary), (SiL) Spring into Love, (MM) May for Moms, (PtL) Passport to Love, (SN) Summer Nights, (FIL) Fall into Love, and (CtC) Countdown to Christmas are seasonal programming blocks.
(HD) Hallmark DaySpring are films under Hallmark's DaySpring banner.

=== Hallmark Mystery ===
Movie	Starring	Director	Original airdate	Viewers	Ref	DVD
Reality Bites: A Hannah Swensen Mystery	Alison Sweeney and Victor Webster	Kevin Leslie	February 6, 2025	0.62		No
Mystery Island: Winner Takes All	Elizabeth Henstridge and Charlie Weber	Steven R. Monroe	March 13, 2025	N/A		Yes

== 2026 ==
=== Hallmark Channel ===
Movie	Starring	Director	Original airdate	Viewers	Ref	DVD
Lost in Paradise (WE)	Lacey Chabert and Ian Harding	Dustin Rikert	January 3, 2026	N/A		Yes
A Melbourne Match (WE)	Mallory Jansen and Ryan Corr	Colin Budds	January 10, 2026	N/A		
Love on the Amazon (WE)	Jaicy Elliot and Rafael de la Fuente	Colin Theys	January 17, 2026	N/A		
Caught by Love (WE)	Rachael Leigh Cook and Luke Macfarlane	Kevin Fair	January 24, 2026	1.85		
Missing the Boat (WE)	Emilie Ullerup and Kristoffer Polaha	Maclain Nelson	January 31, 2026	1.83		
The Way to You (L)	Kim Matula and Aaron O'Connell	Norma Bailey	February 7, 2026	1.50		
Because of Cupid (L)	Amy Groening and Evan Roderick	Liz Farrer	February 14, 2026	1.30		
The Stars Between Us (L)	Sarah Drew and Matt Long	Michael Robison	February 21, 2026	1.27		
Romance at Hope Ranch (L)	Alison Sweeney and Gabriel Hogan	Tailiah Breon	February 28, 2026	1.64		
Sugar & Vice: A Hannah Swensen Mystery	Alison Sweeney and Victor Webster	Peter Benson	March 7, 2026	1.38		
Nelly Knows Mysteries: All Manners of Murder	Pascale Hutton and Kavan Smith	David I. Strasser	March 14, 2026	1.30		
Two for Tee (SiL)	Janel Parrish and Chris McNally	Michael Robison	March 21, 2026	1.29		
A Royal Setting (SiL)	Jen Lilley and Dan Jeannotte	Bradley Walsh	March 28, 2026	1.29		
A Season to Blossom (SiL)	Emily Tennant and Carlo Marks	Terry Ingram	April 4, 2026	1.09		
A Little Park Music (SiL)	Laci J. Mailey and Beau Mirchoff	Peter Benson	April 11, 2026	1.29		
To Philly with Love (SiL)	Rebecca Dalton and Stephen Huszar	Amy Force	April 18, 2026	1.20		
I'll Be Seeing You (SiL)	Stacey Farber and Tyler Hynes	Jessica Harmon	April 25, 2026	1.28		
Kentucky Roses (MfM)	Odette Annable and Andrew Walker	Clare Niederpruem	May 2, 2026	1.46		
All's Fair in Love and Mahjong (MfM)	Fiona Gubelmann and Paul Campbell	Jessica Harmon	May 9, 2026	1.27		
Best Served Cold: A Hannah Swensen Mystery	Alison Sweeney and Victor Webster	Peter Benson	May 16, 2026	1.16		
True Justice: Eye for an Eye	Katherine McNamara and Markian Tarasiuk	Lisa Soper	May 23, 2026	0.84		
Haunted Harmony Mysteries: Key to the Castle	Tamera Mowry-Housley and Risteard Cooper	Linda-Lisa Hayter	May 30, 2026	0.98		
The Greek Aisle (SN)	Nikki DeLoach and Apostolis Totsikas	Maclain Nelson	June 6, 2026	1.42		
Texas Two-Step (SN)	Heather Hemmens and Brendan Penny	Eva Tavares	June 13, 2026	1.18		
The Love Heist (SN)	Lyndsy Fonseca and Peter Porte	Kevin Fair	June 20, 2026	1.14		
A Castle of Our Own (SN)	Brennan Elliott and Erica Cerra	Kay Shioma Metchie	June 27, 2026	1.24		
Christmas Under Construction (CiJ)	Jessica Lowndes and Daniel Lissing	Robin Dunne	July 4, 2026	N/A		
O Little Christmas Market (CiJ)	Katherine Barrell and Stephen Huszar	Mars Horodyski	July 11, 2026	0.98		
Snowbound for the Holidays (CiJ)	Vanessa Lengies and Marcus Rosner	Christopher Giroux	July 18, 2026	1.42		
Love Under the Mistletoe (CiJ)	Jen Lilley and Nick Bateman	Bradley Walsh	July 25, 2026	1.21		
Toast to Italy (HC25)	Torrey DeVitto and Will Kemp	Michael Robison	August 1, 2026	1.19		
Absolutely Devoted to You (HC25)	Kimberley Sustad and Jesse Metcalfe	Stacey N. Harding	August 8, 2026	1.28		
Aussie at Heart (HC25)	Daniel Lissing and Rhiannon Fish	Colin Budds	August 15, 2026	1.34		
Love Finds You (FiL)	Chris McNally and Aimee Teegarden	Eva Tavares	August 22, 2026	1.26		
Much About Love (FiL)	Niall Matter and Ashley Williams	Shamim Sarif	August 29, 2026	1.16		
Haunted Harmony Mysteries: Prelude to a Wedding (FiL)	Tamera Mowry-Housley and Risteárd Cooper	Ali Liebert	September 5, 2026	0.92		
Falling into Place (FiL)	Nathan Witte and Alvina August	Angie Nolan	September 12, 2026	0.88		
Garage Sale Mysteries: Murder Takes the Stage (FiL)	Lori Loughlin and Steve Bacic	Paula Elle	September 19, 2026	0.90		
Pumpkin Regatta Romance (FiL)	Mishael Morgan and Corey Sevier	Liz Farrer	September 26, 2026	1.11		
A Knight to Remember (FiL)	Julie Gonzalo and James Trevena	Kevin Fair	October 3, 2026	1.29		
The Spirit of Halloween (FiL)	Kevin McGarry and Meghan Ory	Jeff Beesley	October 10, 2026	0.94		
’Tis the Season for Setups (CtC)	Amanda Schull, Victor Webster and Barbara Niven	Jeff Beesley	October 16, 2026	0.86		
Holiday Touchdown: A Bears Love Story (CtC)	Lyndsy Fonseca and Robert Buckley	Dustin Rikert	October 17, 2026	1.24		
Mr. & Mrs. Christmas (CtC)	Brendan Penny and Pascale Hutton	Peter Benson	October 18, 2026	1.00		
Winter Wonderlanes (CtC)	Ashley Newbrough and Franco Lo Presti	Max McGuire	October 23, 2026	0.62		
Forgotten Holiday (CtC)	Janel Parrish and Daniel Lissing	Jessica Harmon	October 24, 2026	1.54		
What If Christmas (CtC)	Lori Loughlin and Tom Cavanagh	Jerry Ciccoritti	October 25, 2026	1.00		
Who’s Coming for Christmas? (CtC)	Rhiannon Fish, Jake Foy and Mila Morgan	David I. Strasser	October 30, 2026	0.98		
Adopting St. Nick (CtC)	Amy Groening and Michael Rady	Jeff Beesley	October 31, 2026	1.37		
A Danish Christmas (CtC)	Emilie Ullerup and Corey Sevier	Colin Theys	November 1, 2026	1.06		
Merry Memories (CtC)	Lindura and Brendan Morgan	Amy Force	November 6, 2026			
Holiday Unplugged (CtC)	Nikki DeLoach and Juan Pablo Di Pace	Michael Robison	November 7, 2026			
A Season of Promises (CtC)	Brooke D’Orsay, Ali Liebert, James Denton	Stacey N. Harding	November 8, 2026			
My Christmas Cowboy (CtC)	Amy Acker, Luke Macfarlane and Sara Canning	Peter Benson	November 13, 2026			
The Nights Before Christmas (CtC)	Tyler Hynes and Laci J Mailey	Lucie Guest	November 14, 2026			
Mistletoe and Mimosas (CtC)	Tamera Mowry-Housley, Kristoffer Polaha and Jennifer Robertson	Linda-Lisa Hayter	November 15, 2026			
Our Holiday Playbook (CtC)	Taylor Cole and Charles Michael Davis	Terry Ingram	November 20, 2026			
Christmas in Blue Dog Valley (CtC)	Erin Cahill and Andrew Walker	Kevin Fair	November 21, 2026			
Double Booked for the Holidays (CtC)	Rachael Leigh Cook, Owain Yeoman and Stephen Hagan	Clare Niederpruem	November 22, 2026			
Christmas Delivered (CtC)	Autumn Reeser, Wes Brown and Linda Darlow		November 26, 2026			
The Christmas Eve Feast (CtC)	Daniella Monet and Kevin McGarry		November 27, 2026			
Return to Santa (CtC)	Paul Campbell and Rachel Boston		November 27, 2026			
The Most Wonderful Secret (CtC)	Tammin Sursok and Peter Porte		November 28, 2026			
Holiday Ever After: A Disney World Wish Come True (CtC)	Lacey Chabert and Travis Van Winkle		November 28, 2026			
Eight Nights for Love (CtC)	Hunter King and Dan Jeannotte		November 29, 2026			
Miles to Christmas (CtC)	Ashley Williams, Steve Lund and Alison Sweeney		November 29, 2026			
The Snowflake Effect (CtC)	Heather Hemmens and Mark Ghanimé		December 4, 2026			
A Grand Biltmore Christmas (CtC)	Holland Roden and Niall Matter		December 5, 2026			
An Angel in My Stocking (CtC)	Fiona Gubelmann, Marco Grazzini and Nancy Robertson		December 6, 2026			
Christmas in Canterbury (CtC)	Jessy Schram and Will Kemp		December 11, 2026			
Snow Globe Town (CtC)	Kimberley Sustad and Scott Michael Foster		December 12, 2026			
Noelle Nomads (CtC)	Benjamin Ayres and Torrey DeVitto		December 13, 2026			
Hearts All Aglow (CtC)	Mishael Morgan, B.J. Britt and Holly Robinson Peete		December 18, 2026			
Barking All the Way (CtC)	Ian Harding and Tori Anderson		December 19, 2026			
Save the Date for Christmas (CtC)	Jonathan Bennett and Italia Ricci		December 20, 2026			

WE (Winter Escape), L (Loveuary), SiL (Spring into Love), MfM (May for Moms), SN (Summer Nights), CiJ (Christmas in July), HC25 (Hallmark Channel’s 25th Birthday), FiL (Fall into Love), and CtC (Countdown to Christmas) are seasonal programming blocks.

== See also ==
- List of Hallmark Hall of Fame episodes (and Category)
- List of programs broadcast by Hallmark Channel (and Category)
