= Marcus Rosner =

Canadian actor (born 1989)

- Born: August 10, 1989 (age 37); Campbell River, British Columbia, Canada
- Occupation: Actor
- Years active: 2012–present
- Spouse: Alison Kroeker (m. 2021)
- Children: 1

Marcus Rosner (born August 10, 1989) is a Canadian actor. He has appeared in a wide variety of television and film projects since 2012. Some of his more notable roles include appearances in the TV shows Unreal, Arrow, Supernatural, and Once Upon a Time.

== Early life ==
Marcus Rosner was born in Campbell River, British Columbia. He moved around a lot as a child but was raised primarily in Sherwood Park, Alberta. He started out his career as an actor in Vancouver, British Columbia and has spent time living in Toronto, Ontario.

== Career ==
=== 2010s ===
Rosner began his acting career in 2012, when he made his television debut as an actor at age 23 in the CW television film Joey Dakota, where he played the lead role of Ty. Rosner appeared in the superhero series Arrow, portrayed as Max Fuller.

In 2014, Rosner appeared in the Hallmark Movies & Mysteries Channel Television film Garage Sale Mystery: All That Glitters as Tim.

In 2015, Rosner appeared in the sci-fi film Tomorrowland as Handsome Harry. In the same year, Rosner played the role of Jack Collins in the Hallmark Channel television film A Christmas Detour opposite Candace Cameron Bure, Paul Greene, Sarah Strange and David James Lewis, directed by Ron Oliver.

In 2016, Rosner co-starred with Taylor Cole, Andrew Walker and Alley Mills in the Hallmark Channel Television film Appetite for Love as Reed. In the same year, Rosner appeared in the television film Summer of Dreams. Rosner was cast in the role of Marco DeLuca in the Hallmark Channel television film Autumn In the Vineyard. He reprised his role in the television sequels Summer in the Vineyard and Valentine in the Vineyard. Rosner starred Anna Hutchison and Anita Brown in the ION Television film A Firehouse Christmas as Tom Norris, directed by George Erschbamer.

In 2017, Rosner starred in the Hallmark Channel television films such as: The Birthday Wish as Alex, A Harvest Wedding as Tom Nichols and Christmas In Evergreen as Spencer. In the same year, Rosner worked in the Lifetime television films such as: Infidelity in Suburbia as Elliot Graverston and Maternal Instinct as Marshall Lancaster.

In 2018, Rosner appeared on the third season of the drama series Unreal, where he played the role of Warren Johnson, a contestant who is a rancher with a cowboy attitude. In that same year, Rosner worked in the television films Yes, I Do as James and Poinsettias for Christmas as Sean Dalton.

In 2019, Rosner starred with Cindy Busby in the Hallmark Channel television films The Killer Downstairs as James Brewer and also starred with Megan Hilty in Sweet Mountain Christmas as Mayor Robbie Buckley.

=== 2020s ===
In 2020, Rosner starred alongside Chelsea Hobbs and Matthew Kevin Anderson in the thriller film Killer in the Guest House directed and written by Tony Dean Smith, where he played the lead role of Mark James. In the same year, Rosner was cast in the lead role of Marcus in the Hallmark movie Love on Harbor Island with Morgan Kohan, directed by Lucie Guest. Also the same year, Rosner starred with Lisa Durupt in the film Christmas with a Crown as Prince Nicholas, which was directed by Dylan Pearce.

In 2021, Rosner starred in the UpTV television films such as Love Stories in Sunflower Valley as Drew Hutton and A Vineyard Romance as Liam Hawthorne.

In 2022, Rosner was cast in the role of Kevin in the romantic comedy film Romance to the Rescue directed by Heather Hawthorn Doyle. On the same year, Rosner was cast in the role of Nico in the romantic comedy film My Fake Boyfriend opposite Keiynan Lonsdale, Dylan Sprouse and Sarah Hyland, directed by Rose Troche, which was released on June 17, 2022, on Amazon Prime Video.

Rosner starred with Rebecca Dalton in the television movie From Italy with Amore directed by Dylan Pearce, where he played the lead role of Daniel.

In 2023, Rosner appeared on the first season of the series The Love Club as Jos Nolan. In the same year, Rosner starred Rhiannon Fish in the TV film Team Bride as Will, which was directed by Dylan Pearce.

Rosner was cast in the supporting role of Austin McMurray, Isabel's (Nancy Travis) eldest son and Missy's (Tiera Skovbye) husband, in the neo-Western drama series Ride, which was premiered on March 26, 2023, on Hallmark Channel.

Rosner starred along with actress Elena Juatco in the TV movie Finding Mr. Right, where he played the lead role of Luke. He co-starred with Ashley Williams, Luke Macfarlane and Peter Porte in the Hallmark Channel movie Notes of Autumn portraying Sam Perkins.

Rosner starred with Sara Canning in the 2023 TV Film Coupled Up for Christmas, in which he played the lead role of Peter Brooks. Rosner starred in Katherine Barrell's Flipping for Christmas with Ashley Newbrough.

Rosner played the lead role of Mark in the Hallmark Channel romantic comedy movie About An Ice Palace Romance with Celeste Desjardins.

== Personal life ==
In December 2020, Rosner announced his engagement to longtime girlfriend Alison Kroeker, a producer. They were married on December 30, 2021 in Guatemala. In January 2026, the couple welcomed their first child, a son.

== Filmography ==
Year	Title	Role	Notes
2012	This American Housewife	Doug	Episode: "Pilot"
2012	Joey Dakota	Ty	CW Television film
2012	The Secret Circle	Richard Armstrong	Episode: "Witness"
2012–2018	Arrow	Max Fuller	2 episodes
2013	Untold Stories of the ER	Cowboy Charlie	Episode: "Cowboy Chaos/Teen Turmoil/Rod on the Road"
2013	Entertainment	Micky	Short film
2014	Continuum	Freelancer #1	Episode: "The Dying Minutes"
2014	Rush	Kent	Episode: "We Are Family"
2014	Garage Sale Mystery: All That Glitters	Tim	Hallmark Movies & Mysteries Channel Television film
2014	Supernatural	Dash	Episode: "Ask Jeeves"
2014	Once Upon a Time	Jurgen	2 episodes
2014	Girlfriends' Guide to Divorce	Mike	2 episodes
2015	Tomorrowland	Handsome Harry	Uncredited
2015	When Calls the Heart	Charles Kensington	7 episodes
2015	Mistresses	Brad	Episode: "Love is an Open Door"
2015	Single & Dating in Vancouver	Matt	Episode: "Leave the Last Two Out"
2015	A Christmas Detour	Jack Collins	Hallmark Channel Television film
2015	Ghost Unit	Dex	1 episode
2016	Appetite for Love	Reed	Hallmark Channel Television film
2016	You Me Her	Alex	Episode: "Cigarettes and Funions and Crap"
2016	Summer Dreams	Liam	Hallmark Channel Television film
2016	Autumn In the Vineyard	Marco DeLuca	Hallmark Channel Television film
2016	A Firehouse Christmas	Tom Norris	ION Television film
2017	Fixer Upper Mysteries	Stephen Davison	Episode: "Framed For Murder: A Fixer Upper Mystery"
2017	The Birthday Wish	Alex	Hallmark Channel Television film
2017	Infidelity in Suburbia	Elliot Graverston	Lifetime Television film
2017	Summer in the Vineyard	Marco DeLuca	Hallmark Channel Television film
2017	A Harvest Wedding	Tom Nichols	Hallmark Channel Television film
2017	Maternal Instinct	Marshall Lancaster	Lifetime Television film
2017	Christmas In Evergreen	Spencer	Hallmark Channel Television film
2018	Unreal	Warren	6 episodes
2018	Poinsettias for Christmas	Sean Dalton	Lifetime Television film
2018	Yes, I Do	James	Hallmark Channel Television film
2019	Valentine in the Vineyard	Marco DeLuca	Hallmark Channel Television film
2019	The Killer Downstairs	James Brewer	Lifetime Television film
2019	Sweet Mountain Christmas	Robbie	Lifetime Television Film
2019	Dance with a Demon	Dad	Short film (post-production)
2020	The Wedding Planners	William	Episode: "Sweet Home Wedding"
2020	Killer in the Guest House	Mark James	Lifetime Television film
2020	Love on Harbor Island	Marcus	Hallmark Channel Television film
2020	Christmas with a Crown	Prince Nicholas	
2021	Love Stories in Sunflower Valley	Drew Hutton	UpTV Television film
2021	A Vineyard Romance	Liam Hawthorne	UpTV Television film
2022	Romance to the Rescue	Kevin	Hallmark Channel Television film
2022	My Fake Boyfriend	Nico	
2022	From Italy with Amore	Daniel	
2023	Sex/Life	Sven	Episode: "The Weakness in Me"
2023	The Love Club	Josh Nolan	2 episodes
2023	Team Bride	Will	
2023	Ride	Austin McMurray	Recurring role
2023	Finding Mr. Right	Luke	
2023	Notes of Autumn	Sam Perkins	Hallmark Channel Television film
2023	Christmas in Maple Hills	Walker Jennings	
2023	Flipping for Christmas	Bo	Hallmark Channel Television film
2023	Coupled Up for Christmas	Peter Brooks	
2023	An Ice Palace Romance	Mark	Hallmark Movies Now film
2024	Love on the Right Course	Daniel	Hallmark Channel Television film
2024	Falling Like Snowflakes	Noah	Hallmark Channel Television film
2025-2026	Sullivan's Crossing	Liam	9 episodes
2026	Snowbound for the Holidays	Trey Sanderson	Hallmark Channel Television film
