= Slightly Single in L.A. =

- Theatrical release poster
- Directed by: Christie Will
- Written by: Christie Will
- Produced by: Alejandro Salomon; Jeff Most; Fred Cipoletti; Graham Garner; Jeff Rice; Mike Becker
- Starring: Lacey Chabert; Kip Pardue; Jenna Dewan; Jonathan Bennett; Carly Schroeder; Haylie Duff; Chris Kattan; Simon Rex; Mircea Monroe
- Edited by: Danny Saphire
- Music by: Michael Tavera
- Release date: December 1, 2012
- Country: United States
- Language: English
- Budget: $2 million
- Box office: $13,567

Slightly Single in L.A. is an American romantic comedy film, written and directed by Christie Will and starring Lacey Chabert, Kip Pardue, Haylie Duff, Carly Schroeder, Jenna Dewan, and Jonathan Bennett. The film was released in December 2012.

== Cast ==
- Lacey Chabert as Dale Squire, the main protagonist
- Kip Pardue as Zach, Dale's love interest
- Jenna Dewan as Hallie, one of Dale's best girl friends
- Carly Schroeder as Becca, one of Dale's best girl friends
- Jonathan Bennett as Seven, Dale's best friend
- Haylie Duff as Jill, Dale's other best friend
- Mircea Monroe as CeCe, a friend of Zach's
- Chris Kattan as Drew, Jill's fiancé
- Simon Rex as J.P., a photographer that Dale sleeps with from time to time

== Plot ==
Dale (Chabert) a television producer for a reality TV show, has had a poor history of dating. So she moves to Los Angeles, and just enjoys hanging out with friends, and has sworn off dating. That is until an old friend from many years ago (Pardue) reappears in her life.

== Production ==
The film was shot on location in Los Angeles, California. Production used various restaurants, parks, homes, and clubs in Los Angeles for some of the film, including the Les Deux and Wonderland nightclubs. The film was produced by Helios Productions, along with Most/Rice Films and Imprint Entertainment.

== Music ==
Original music which accompanied the film includes The Aaron Hendra Project and Charly (21st Century Girl).
