= Steel Toes =

- Directed by: Mark Adam; David Gow
- Written by: David Gow
- Produced by: Francine Allaire
- Starring: David Strathairn; Andrew Walker; Aaron Grunfeld; Ivan Smith; Ron Lea
- Cinematography: Mark Adam
- Edited by: Mark Adam; Susan Shanks
- Music by: Benoît Groulx
- Distributed by: Monterey Media; Film Tonic
- Release date: 2007
- Running time: 87 minutes
- Countries: Canada; United States
- Language: English
- Budget: 1,300,000 (CAD)

Steel Toes is a 2007 film directed by David Gow and Mark Adam and starring David Strathairn. It was filmed in Montreal, Quebec, and was produced by Galafilm. The film was based on writer/director David Gow's play Cherry Docs.

== Plot ==
Danny Dunkleman (David Strathairn) is a Jewish humanist and a lawyer who works for the court system in Canada. He is assigned to defend Mike Downey (Andrew Walker), a neo-Nazi skinhead who is accused of a brutal, racially motivated murder. Behind prison walls, the two have a clash of ideologies as Dunkleman attempts to put his professional beliefs before his personal beliefs, and his client clings to his hateful beliefs.

== Reception ==
Dennis Schwartz gave it a grade C+.

== Awards ==
- Best Feature (non studio affiliated) Cine Golen Eagle Award, 2007
- Achievement in Independent Cinema, Houston World Fest
