= Marika Siewert =

- Also known as: MARIKA
- Genres: Pop
- Occupations: Singer, songwriter, actor, director
- Years active: 2003–present
- Website: marikasiewert.com

Marika (also spelled MARIKA) is a Canadian recording artist, singer, songwriter, actor, and director. MARIKA has had two top 40 radio singles in Canada, as well as songs placed with Elise Estrada, Elin Universal Music Group Germany, and Korea's Lee Hyori with "My Life" M-NET and Kim Bo Kyung. She also has songs placed on several seasons of America's Next Top Model, MTV and her single "ANGEL" was featured on the Lifetime network's original movie Sins of the Mother. MARIKA performed back in Medicine Hat for the 2010 Winter Olympics Torch relay where she shared the stage with County Superstar Terri Clark. The pair were chosen to perform because of their Medicine Hat roots. MARIKA was also recognized as Virgin 95.3 CKZZ-FM Best of BC artist as a result of her single release in 2011 – "Soldier". MARIKA released in 2004 an album called Untitled Chances, followed by radio singles in 2006 and 2007 "Christmas Came Early", "You Know I Will", and "Radio". "You Know I Will" got MARIKA nominated as best new artist in the Urban Category at the Canadian Radio Music Awards in 2007. Her album Unstoppable released in 2013 won the GMA Covenant awards Pop album of the Year, and she also recently was a featured singer on the new Hallmark TV channel's original series Signed, Sealed, Delivered which was executive produced by Martha Williamson who wrote and produced Touched by an Angel. She also shared the stage with Grammy and Dove award winners Michael W. Smith, Steven Curtis Chapman, and Juno award winner Brian Doerksen on their one time only United Tour. In December 2013, she wrote "This Christmas Time" produced by 604 Records producer Colin Janz, which was released to radio across Canada and parts of the US and garnered national airplay. In 2024, Marika won best artist at the Western Canadian Music awards for Best Spiritual Artist. She currently is a frequent collaborator and tour partner with Canadian songwriter and singer Brian Doerksen, performing on songs like "Every Dream (God Who Sees)", "There Must Be A Place" 35th anniversary of the album "Father's House" and "The Gift Of Home". Marika is a Leo award-winning director for the Christmas Specials with Brian Doerksen and she has produced award-winning special event music films "Christmas At Our House with Brian Doerksen and Friends", "Easter At The Shining Rose" and "Home For Christmas" all of which aired on network television across Canada and globally online. Marika has numerous credits as an actor on film and television, and streaming networks like Netflix, Amazon Prime and Apple TV. Credits including Monarch: Legacy of Monsters on Apple TV+, Superman & Lois on The CW, and Project MC2 for Netflix. Her family are all work in film and television and have over 100 credits together in film, television, VoiceOver and commercials. Marika was born in San Fernando, Trinidad, raised in Newcastle, and Solihull, West Midlands, England and Medicine Hat, Alberta. She currently resides in Vancouver, British Columbia.

In 2025, Siewert played a minor role in the movie The Boy Who Vanished.
