= The Boy Who Vanished =

2025 drama thriller film

- Theatrical release poster
- Directed by: Christie Will Wolf
- Written by: Ken Miyamoto
- Produced by: Bruce Harvey
- Starring: Tegan Moss; Aiden Howard; Jesse Moss; Matthew Kevin Anderson; Gord Pankhurst
- Cinematography: Diego Lozano
- Edited by: Michael P. Vidler
- Music by: Michael Neilson
- Production company: A+E Global Media
- Distributed by: Lifetime
- Release date: June 15, 2025 (Lifetime Movie Network)
- Running time: 88 minutes
- Country: Canada
- Language: English

The Boy Who Vanished is a 2025 drama thriller film directed by Christie Will Wolf and written by Ken Miyamoto. It stars Tegan Moss, Aiden Howard, Jesse Moss, and Matthew Kevin Anderson in the main roles.

== Synopsis ==
The film follows the life of the Reese family, whose eldest son Jack has been missing for twelve years. One day his parents, Haley and Richard, are informed that Jack was abducted and murdered by Haley's sister, Michael. However, Jack suddenly shows up at a police station, telling police about his ordeal. When the authorities question the youth and want to take a blood sample to verify his identity, Haley rejects the idea, saying that she is certain that the young man is indeed Jack. As the family, including Jack's younger brother, tries to get back to their normal lives and routines, Jack begins showing suspicious behaviors that will raise the doubt about who he really is.

== Cast ==
- Tegan Moss as Haley Reese
- Aiden Howard as Jack Reese
- Matthew Kevin Anderson as Richard Reese
- Gord Pankhurst as Travis
- Jesse Moss as Michael Conner, Haley's brother
- Kingston Goodjohn as Tyler Reese, the family's youngest son
- Vincent Ross as Detective Doyle
- Grace Beedie as Summer
- Maia Michaels as Luna
- Marika Siewert as Principal Jacobs

== Reception ==
The film received mixed reviews. Chuck Duncan of Hotchka gave The Boy Who Vanished a generally favorable review, praising the acting of the Moss siblings, saying that "their connection (as siblings) is even more real than what it is scripted." Duncan also highlighted Gord Pankhurst's role, comparing his character to American cult leader and criminal Charles Manson.

Joe Lipsett of Bloody Disgusting gave the film three skulls out of five, with a generally favorable review, praising the acting of Tegan Moss and highlighting director Wolf's decision to make it a "more thoughtful and emotional" movie than other more "histrionic films" by Lifetime.

The website Lifetime Uncorked gave a more negative review of the movie, saying that the film's opening gives a hint at what happens in the end, making it predictable.
