= A Snow Capped Christmas =

2016 television film by Christie Will Wolf

- Promotional poster
- Also known as: Falling for Christmas
- Written by: Barbara Kymlicka
- Directed by: Christie Will Wolf
- Starring: Leah Renee; Niall Matter; Michael Teigen; Lisa Whelchel; Gracyn Shinyei
- Music by: Christopher Nickel
- Country of origin: Canada
- Original language: English

Production
- Executive producers: John MacDonald; Timothy O. Johnson
- Producer: Oliver De Caigny
- Cinematography: Anthony Metchie
- Editor: Fabiola Caraza
- Running time: 90 minutes
- Production company: Johnson Production Group

Original release
- Network: W Network
- Release: November 6, 2016

A Snow Capped Christmas (broadcast as Falling for Christmas in the United States) is a 2016 Canadian Christmas romantic drama television film directed by Christie Will Wolf and starring Leah Renee, Niall Matter, Michael Teigen, Lisa Whelchel and Gracyn Shinyei. It premiered in Canada on W Network on November 6, 2016, and in the United States on Up Network on November 26, 2016.

== Plot ==
Claire Benson is a figure skater who is broken on the inside and out. Driven to the brink by her coach, she is forced to spend the weeks leading up to Christmas in the picturesque mountain regions of Western Canada at a sports rehabilitation center. While resting, Claire meets Luke, a single father and former Canadian hockey player. Forced to retire early from the game due to an injury, Luke now spends his time raising his daughter while running the local ice fishing and tackle shop. This unlikely duo locks horns only to discover they have more in common than they thought. A true man of the Canadian north, Luke teaches Claire all the activities that personify a Canadian winter—from snowmobiling and ice fishing to chopping down a real Christmas tree for the holidays.

On her part, Claire encourages Luke—who has not played a game of hockey since being forced to retire—back onto the ice. Together with his former hockey teammates, Luke rouses the town's Christmas spirit when, on Christmas Eve, they engage in a truly Canadian tradition of playing a game of hockey on the ice covered lake. Luke and his daughter's Christmas is complete when Claire returns to the mountains having learned that there is more to life than competition.

== Cast ==
- Leah Renee as Claire Benson
- Niall Matter as Luke
- Michael Teigen as Jullian, Claire's coach
- Gracyn Shinyei as Chamonix
- Lisa Whelchel as Dale, Claire's mother
- Lochlyn Munro as Lou
- Blaine Anderson as Greg, Claire's father
- Kathryn Kirkpatrick as Dr. Schmidt

== Production ==
A Snow Capped Christmas was filmed from February 1 to March 5, 2016, in the Okanagan wilderness at Manning Park and Maple Ridge in British Columbia, Canada. The film was produced by Qube films.

== Reception ==
Westword calls the film a "cinematic meditation on sports psychology, career-ending injuries and, of course, the Christmas spirit." Country Living included it in its list of "30 Best Christmas Movies" in 2021.

== See also ==
- List of Christmas films
