= Five Star Christmas =

American-Canadian romantic comedy film

- Written by: Alfonso H. Moreno
- Story by: Stephen Witkin; Michael Elliot
- Directed by: Christie Will Wolf
- Starring: Bethany Joy Lenz; Victor Webster; Robert Wisden; Laura Soltis; Jay Brazeau; Grace Beedie
- Music by: Terry Frewer
- Country of origin: United States
- Original language: English

Production
- Executive producers: Stephen Harmaty; Suzie Belzberg Krevoy; Doran S. Chandler; Kevin Goetz; Neil Goetz; Stephen Hornyak; Vince Balzano; Eric Jarboe; Amanda Phillips Atkins; Brad Krevoy
- Producer: Ron French
- Cinematography: Amy Belting
- Editor: Karen Porter
- Running time: 84 minutes
- Production companies: All Canadian Entertainment; Hallmark Entertainment

Original release
- Network: Hallmark Channel
- Release: November 27, 2020

Five Star Christmas is a 2020 American-Canadian made-for-television romantic comedy film directed by Christie Will Wolf, from a screenplay by Alfonso H. Moreno, from a story by Stephen Witkin and Michael Elliot. It stars Bethany Joy Lenz, Victor Webster, Robert Wisden, Laura Soltis, Jay Brazeau and Grace Beedie. It premiered on November 27, 2020, on Hallmark Channel.

== Plot ==
When a travel writer unexpectedly shows up at their family's bed and breakfast, the Ralston family pretends to be guests in hopes of a good review, Lucy falls for guest Jake.

== Cast ==
- Bethany Joy Lenz as Lucy Ralston
- Victor Webster as Jake
- Robert Wisden as Ted Ralston
- Laura Soltis as Beth
- Jay Brazeau as Walter Ralston
- Grace Beedie as Amber Ralston
- Barbara Patrick as Suzanne Ralston
- Blair Penner as Will Ralston
- Sarah Edmondson as Annie Ralston
- Tom Pickett as Mr. Donahue
- Paula Shaw as Margo

== Production ==
Principal photography began in October 2020, in Vancouver, Canada.

== Release ==
It premiered on November 27, 2020, on Hallmark Channel.
