= My Fake Boyfriend =

- Directed by: Rose Troche
- Written by: Luke Albright; Greg Boaldin; Joe Wanjai Ross
- Produced by: Jason Moring; Michael Philip; Richard Alan Reid
- Starring: Keiynan Lonsdale; Dylan Sprouse; Sarah Hyland
- Cinematography: Stephen Chandler Whitehead
- Edited by: Katheryn Rupert
- Music by: Chanell Crichlow
- Production company: BuzzFeed
- Distributed by: Lionsgate
- Release date: June 17, 2022
- Running time: 90 minutes
- Country: Canada
- Language: English

My Fake Boyfriend is a 2022 Canadian romantic comedy film written by Luke Albright, Greg Boaldin and Joe Wanjai Ross, directed by Rose Troche and starring Keiynan Lonsdale, Dylan Sprouse, and Sarah Hyland.

== Plot ==
In order to help his friend Andrew get over his on-again, off-again relationship with Nico, Jake creates an AI boyfriend, Cristiano. Cristiano becomes a huge online influencer. Andrew then meets and falls for restauranteur, Rafi. Andrew wants Cristiano shut down, as does Jakes’s wife Kelly, but Jake refuses as he is feeling successful in managing the AI. Kelly takes things into her own hands and ultimately results in a very public outing of the ruse. Andrew tries to make amends with Rafi.

== Cast ==
- Keiynan Lonsdale as Andrew
- Dylan Sprouse as Jake
- Sarah Hyland as Kelly
- Samer Salem as Rafi
- Marcus Rosner as Nico
- Karen Robinson as Lucille
- Jaden Goetz as Cristiano
- Rachel Risen as Emily
- Dean McDermott as Famous Director
- Simon Sinn as Mr. Jiang

== Release ==
The film was released on Amazon Prime Video on June 17, 2022.

== Reception ==
The film has a 67% rating on Rotten Tomatoes based on nine reviews.

Lena Wilson of The New York Times gave the film a positive review and wrote, "To set expectations, it’s best to think of My Fake Boyfriend as two movies."

Jayne Nelson of Radio Times awarded the film three stars out of five and wrote, "There are few surprises, but a watchable cast and a gentle, wry script work wonders to keep a tired old formula feel fresh."

Graeme Guttmann of Screen Rant awarded the film two and a half stars out of five and wrote, "Lonsdale carries this love story, even if it spends a little too much time focused on its outlandish premise and not enough time exploring the actual romance."
