= Christie Will Wolf =

Canadian writer, director and producer

- Born: Christine Will Wolf; Blue Mountain, Ontario, Canada
- Education: Emerson College (BFA); The College of Charleston (BA); University of British Columbia (MFA)
- Occupations: Director, producer, writer
- Years active: 1987–present

Christie Will Wolf is a Canadian film and television writer, director and producer. She is best known for writing and directing a number of films, including Over The Moon, Her Infidelity, Eat, Play, Love, Boy Toy, Forever Christmas, Slightly Single in L.A., Yes, I Do, and more. Will has received the Directors Guild of Canada Legacy Award for the film Her Coming.

== Early life ==
Will was born in Ontario, Canada. Her parents died when she was a child. She went to boarding school at Trinity College School in Ontario Canada, and was in the first class of girls when the all male institution became co-ed. She received the Terry Fox Scholarship upon graduation. Will studied musical theatre at Emerson College in Boston. She subsequently attended the College of Charleston, earning a Bachelor of Arts in Theatre and Art History, and later completed a Master of Fine Arts in Film and Creative Writing from the University of British Columbia.

After her studies, she moved to Los Angeles to work as a director, writer, and actor. She attended Playhouse West in Burbank, California and also worked for theatre. While dividing her time between Canada and Los Angeles, she founded The Beaumont Playhouse, a black box theatre in Vancouver teaching the works of Sanford Meisner.

== Career ==
Will produced, directed, and wrote her debut short film Dysfunction in 2006. She worked as an assistant to actor, director, and producer Peter Berg, and then worked for Paula Abdul developing her reality show Hey Paula. After that, she produced and developed several movies, including Hollywood & Wine, starring David Spade, Chris Kattan, Norm Macdonald, Chazz Palminteri, Chris Parnell, and the Farley brothers. She was a producer of Christmas in Wonderland, starring Patrick Swayze and Tim Curry, as well as Blonde and Blonder starring Pamela Anderson and Denise Richards. In 2009, Will made her first feature film Slightly Single in L.A, starring Jenna Dewan, Lacey Chabert, Chris Kattan, and Kip Pardue. She was the writer, director, and co-producer of the film, which was a pioneer acquisition for Netflix. She then wrote and directed the comedy Boy Toy, starring Mircea Monroe, Vivian Bang, and Morgan Fairchild, which was released by Lionsgate. Later, she wrote and directed A Holiday Heist, starring Vivica A. Fox. She has produced and directed made-for-TV films for the Hallmark Channel, Lifetime, and Up TV, including Becoming Santa, Baby Boot Camp, A Cookie Cutter Christmas, Her Infidelity, A Snow Capped Christmas, Killer Ending, Yes I Do and So You Said Yes, among others. In 2019, Wolf won the award for Best Screenwriting at The West Coast Canadian Screen Awards.

== Filmography ==
| Name | TV/Film | Year | Position |
|---|---|---|---|
| Dysfunction | Short Film | 2006 | Producer, director, Writer |
| Christmas in Wonderland | Film | 2007 | Co-producer |
| Blonde and Blonder | Film | 2008 | Co-producer |
| That's Amore V Series | 2008 | Overnight Supervising Producer | |
| A Shot at Love with Tila Tequila | TV series | 2008 | Overnight Supervising Producer |
| Canine Theatre | TV series | 2007-08 | Producer |
| Tool Academy | TV series | 2009 | Overnight Supervising Producer |
| Real Estate 101 | TV series | 2011 | Senior supervising producer |
| Hollywood & Wine | Film | 2011 | Co-producer, Actor |
| FMA Weekly | TV series | 2011 | Producer, Host |
| Boy Toy | Video | 2011 | Producer, director, Writer |
| A Holiday Heist | Film | 2011 | Producer, director, Writer |
| Rockstar Academy | TV series | 2011 | Senior supervising producer |
| Baby Boot Camp | Film | 2014 | Producer, director, Writer |
| A Cookie Cutter Christmas | Film | 2014 | Producer, director |
| Her Infidelity | Film | 2015 | Producer, director, writer |
| A Snow Capped Christmas | Film | 2016 | Producer, director |
| A Dash of Love | Film | 2017 | Director |
| Harvest Love | Film | 2017 | Director, writer |
| A Christmas Solo | Film | 2017 | Director |
| The Christmas Trap | Short Film | 2017 | Director, writer |
| Infidelity in Suburbia | Film | 2017 | Producer, director, Writer |
| Eat, Play, Love | Film | 2017 | Producer, director |
| Killer Ending | Film | 2018 | Director, writer |
| Yes, I Do | Film | 2018 | Producer, director |
| Poinsettias for Christmas | Film | 2018 | Director, producer |
| Forever Christmas | Film | 2018 | Director |
| Over the Moon in Love | Film | 2019 | Director, co-executive producer |
| Identity Theft of a Cheerleader | Film | 2019 | Director, co-executive producer |
| Love Unleashed | Film | 2019 | Co-executive producer, Director, Writer |
| A Valentine's Match | Film | 2020 | Director, executive producer |
| Love in the Forecast | Film | 2020 | Producer, director |
| Her Coming | Short Film | 2020 | Producer, director, Writer |
| High Flying Romance | Film | 2020 | Director, writer, Executive Producer |
| Five Star Christmas | Film | 2020 | Director, supervising producer |
| Chasing Waterfalls | Film | 2021 | Director, writer, Executive Producer |
| Love on Fire | Film | 2021 | Director, writer, Producer |
| In Action | Film | 2021 | Director |
| Where Your Heart Belongs | Film | 2022 | Director, writer, Executive Producer |
| Don't Forget I Love You | Film | 2022 | Director |
| Love in Glacier National: A National Park Romance | Film | 2023 | Director, executive producer |
| Ladies of the '80s: A Divas Christmas | Film | 2023 | Director |
| The Boy Who Vanished | Film | 2025 | Director |
