= Ashley Newbrough =

American actress

- Born: October 13, 1987 (age 39); Newport, Rhode Island, United States
- Occupation: Actress
- Years active: 2000–present

Ashley Newbrough is an American actress. She is known for starring as Sage Baker in The CW drama series Privileged (2008–2009) and for starring in a number of predominantly Christmas-themed television films since 2015.

== Career ==
She began her career at the age of ten, appearing in a number of commercials worldwide. She landed her first starring role on the ABC Family series, The Zack Files, playing Alice In Wonderland, alongside Robert Clark, Michael Seater and Jake Epstein. Newbrough then landed roles in television movies, including a minor one in family film Get a Clue starring Lindsay Lohan and Brenda Song.

Newbrough auditioned and was then given her first lead role in the 2004 Lifetime pilot drama The Coven, opposite Paula Devicq and Illeanna Douglas, though ultimately Lifetime did not go forward with the series. Her next role was guest starring in an episode of 1-800-Missing opposite Caterina Scorsone. Newbrough then landed a recurring role, Audrey, in the comedy/drama Radio Free Roscoe, and also appeared on Degrassi: The Next Generation as Melinda. She also recurred as Sloane McCarthy on the TV series The Best Years in 2007.

She was given her big break in the 2007 Syfy film, Kaw, where she played Doris opposite Sean Patrick Flanery and Rod Taylor. Newbrough then scored the role of Dallas, Cake's (Chris Bolton) daughter, on the award-winning Canadian sport comedy Rent-a-Goalie in 2008.

After season 3 wrapped on Rent-a-Goalie, Newbrough moved to Los Angeles after landing the lead role as Sage Baker, co-starring opposite JoAnna Garcia (Megan Smith) and Lucy Hale (Rose Baker) in The CW's drama series Privileged. In 2013–14, Newbrough recurred as Kyra on ABC's Mistresses in seasons 1 and 2. In 2015, she was the lead in the Hallmark Channel movie, Love Under the Stars.

Newbrough also appeared in Nigel Barker's published book: Nigel Barker's The Beauty Equation: Revealing a Better and More Beautiful You in September 2010.

== Personal life ==
Newbrough was in a relationship with actor Matt Shively.

== Filmography ==
Television and film roles
Year	Title	Role	Notes
2000	The Zack Files	Alice	Episode: "The Library of No Return"
2002	Get a Clue	Student #2	Television film
2003–2005	Radio Free Roscoe	Audrey Quinlan	Recurring role, 8 episodes
2004	Missing	Cara Cooper	Episode: "Sea of Love"
2004	The Coven	Alex	Failed television pilot
2005	The Perfect Man	Marjorie	Film; scenes deleted
2005–2006	Degrassi: The Next Generation	Melinda	2 episodes
2007	The Best Years	Sloane McCarthy	4 episodes
2007	Kaw	Doris	Television film
2007–2008	Rent-a-Goalie	Dallas	Recurring role, 6 episodes
2008–2009	Privileged	Sage Baker	Lead role, 18 episodes
2013–2014	Mistresses	Kyra	Recurring role, 5 episodes
2015	Love Under the Stars	Becca	Hallmark Television film
2016	You May Now Kill the Bride	Nicole	Television film
2017	Snowmance	Sarah	Television film
2018	Small Town Christmas	Nell	Hallmark Television film
2019	Betch 1 episode	Buttercup	Television film
2019	A Merry Christmas Match	Corey Calvin	Television film
2019	Christmas Love Letter	Amalie Hess	Television film
2021	The Valentine Competition	Catherine Shank	Television film
2021	Flowers and Honey	Sarah Foster	Television film
2021	Blue Moon Ball	Grace Montague	Television film
2021	Christmas for Keeps	Grace Montague	Television film
2022	Saving Christmas Spirit	Dr. Lucy Stewart	Television film
2023	Love in Glacier National: A National Park Romance	Heather	Television film
2023	Flipping for Christmas	Abigail	Television film
2024	Love on the Right Course	Whitney Jones-Béla	Television film
2024	A Bestselling Kind of Love	Sophie	Television film
2024	Operation Nutcracker	Lottie	Television film
2025	Hearts Around the Table: Jenna's First Love	Jenna Whitaker	Television film
2026	Winter Wonderlanes	Audrey	Television film
