= Andrew Walker (actor) =

Canadian actor and producer

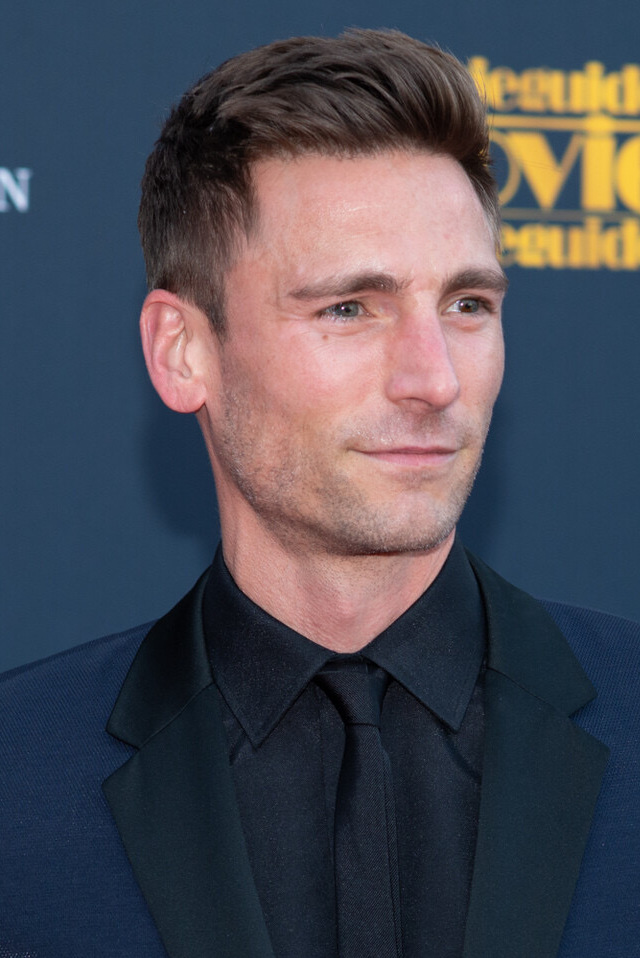
- Walker in 2020
- Born: Montreal, Canada
- Occupations: Actor; film producer
- Years active: 1994–present
- Spouse: Cassandra Troy Walker (m. 2012)
- Children: 2

Andrew Walker is a Canadian actor and film producer. He made his film debut in Laserhawk (1997), followed by roles in American television series such as Maybe It's Me, Sabrina the Teenage Witch, and Hot Properties. He also co-starred in Steel Toes (2006), which earned him an ACTRA Award for Best Actor in 2008. He subsequently appeared in films such as The Mountie and The Gundown, and had a starring role on the Lifetime cop drama Against the Wall.

== Personal life ==
Walker was born in Montréal, Canada on June 9, 1979, the son of the late Joyce Walker, a librarian, and Bruce Walker, a school administrator. His sister is actress and model Jenimay Walker. He is a graduate of Vanier College, where he played football and was given a full scholarship to play at Boston College. After his commitment to BC, he returned home to spring camp at Vanier and tore his anterior cruciate ligament during a routine drill, thus ending his football career.

He is married to fellow Montrealer Cassandra Troy. Together they have two sons: West, born July 2015, and Wolf, born December 2019. In 2013, the couple, along with a friend, started Clover, a company that bottles fresh, cold-pressed juices, with locations in the Los Angeles area. In 2018, the couple rebranded their juice company, naming it Little West after their love of the west coast and their son, West.

== Career ==
Walker started his acting career in Montreal as a recurring lead on the series Student Bodies in 1996-1997, a series lead on Back to Sherwood and then Radio Active from 1998-2000. A month after he arrived in Hollywood he booked a series lead on the TV show Maybe It's Me, then Sabrina, the Teenage Witch. Following a holding deal at Warner Bros., he worked on Wicked Minds, Adopted, Lies and Deception and then landed a recurring spot on the short-lived ABC sitcom Hot Properties.

In 2006, he played a Neo-Nazi skinhead in the film Steel Toes. His performance won him a 2006 Phillip Borsos award at the Whistler Film Festival and the 2008 ACTRA Award for Best Actor.

Walker appeared in the 2007 Lifetime film Abducted: Fugitive For Love. He went on to guest-star on ER, CSI: Miami, CSI: NY, Without a Trace, Reba, and The Big Bang Theory.

In 2010, he guest-starred in the Fox comedy series Sons of Tucson, the Spaghetti Western film The Gundown, and was associate producer for the film Dug Up. In 2011, Walker appeared in a Canadian western film, The Mountie (filmed in 2009), and produced four documentaries and reality TV series in development, also serving as a series regular on Lifetime's cop drama Against the Wall, which was cancelled in December 2011 after thirteen episodes.

In 2012, he starred in his first Hallmark Channel movie A Bride for Christmas alongside Arielle Kebbel. He was reunited with her in Hallmark Movies' Bridal Wave in 2015 after playing Billy Hamilton in two episodes of When Calls the Heart in 2014. He starred with Nikki DeLoach in A Dream of Christmas in 2016, also starring in Appetite for Love and Date with Love. More Hallmark TV movies followed: three more in 2017 (Love Struck Cafe, The Perfect Catch and Love on Ice.), three in 2018 (Secret Valentine, Wedding March 4 and Love in Design), and two more in 2019 (Bottled with Love and Merry and Bright).

He has also starred in several films for Hallmark Mystery, formerly Hallmark Movies and Mysteries: Wedding Planner Mystery in 2014, Debbie Macomber's Dashing Through the Snow in 2015 and Christmas on My Mind in 2019. His first film during SARS-COV-2 (COVID-19) was Christmas Tree Lane with Alicia Witt, also reuniting for the third time with real-life friend Nikki DeLoach in Sweet Autumn, both for Hallmark Mystery, in 2020.

In April 2022, Walker signed a multi-picture contract with Crown Media Family Networks. He has starred in several more films for Hallmark, three in 2021, one in 2022 (Three Wise Men and a Baby), two in 2023, three in 2024 and five in 2025. In 2022, he made his first appearance in the Curious Caterer series of movies, appearing in two more both in 2023 and 2024.

Counting all his movies for both channels, he has appeared in a total of 38 films, making him one of the most featured leading men in the Hallmark system (see filmography below).

== Filmography ==
=== Film ===
Year	Title	Role	Notes
1997	Laserhawk	Bruce	
2001	The Score	Jeff	Uncredited
2001	The Secret Pact	Wills	
2006	The Beach Party at the Threshold of Hell	Franklin	
2007	Steel Toes	Michael "Mike" Downey	
2008	Fast Track: No Limits	Mike Bender Cassidy	
2008	The Torturer	Rick	
2011	The Gundown	Cole Brandt	
2011	The Mountie	Wade Grayling	
2012	Dark Canyon	Jesse Helms	
2013	Penthouse North	Ryan	
2014	2 Bedroom 1 Bath	Kevin	
2015	Loaded	Alex	
2015	Deadly Signal	Dennis	
2018	Oxalis	John Ives	
2018	God Bless the Broken Road	Cody Jackson	

=== Television ===
Year	Title	Role	Notes
1994	Sirens	Bobby Corbin	Episode: "The Needle and the Damage Done"
1995	Ready or Not	Doug/Jake	Episode: "Crater Face"
1996	Are You Afraid of the Dark?	Eric	Episode: "The Tale of the Vacant Lot"
1996	NYPD Blue	Dr. Zisk	Episode: "Auntie Maimed"
1996	My Hometown	Brad	3 episodes
1997–1999	Student Bodies	JJ	10 episodes
1998	Halifax f.p.	Body #4	Episode: "Afraid of the Dark"
1998	V.I.P.	Derskin	Episode: "Val Got Game"
1999	Are You Afraid of the Dark?	Bucky	Episode: "The Tale of the Secret Admirer"
1999	Back to Sherwood	William de Gisborne	Episode: "Scribblers"
1999–2001	Radio Active	Blaire Resnickie	Main role (seasons 2–3)
2001	Heart: The Marilyn Bell Story	Jerry Kerschner	Television film
2001–2002	Maybe It's Me	Rick Stage	Main role
2002–2003	Sabrina the Teenage Witch	Cole Harper	10 episodes
2003	Wicked Minds	Holden Price	Television film
2005	Lies and Deception	Eddie Fate	Television film
2005	Reba	Frank	Episode: "Best Lil' Haunted House in Texas"
2005	Hot Properties	Scott	2 episodes
2006	Cuts	Jeremy	5 episodes
2006	10.5: Apocalypse	Sgt. Corbel	Miniseries
2007	Abducted: Fugitive for Love	Jack Carlson	Television film
2008	ER	Jack	Episode: "Status Quo"
2008	The Big Bang Theory	Mike	Episode: "The Nerdvana Annihilation"
2008	CSI: NY	Greg Pullman	Episode: "Sex, Lies and Silicone"
2008	CSI: Miami	Steve Howell	Episode: "Cheating Death"
2009	Without a Trace	Jay Lester/Blake Keyes/Stephen Garcia/John Burroughs	Episode: "Chameleon"
2009	Web of Lies	Josh Lawson/Jarod	Television film
2010	Sons of Tucson	Danny	Episode: "Gina"
2011	Carnal Innocence	Agent Matthew Burns	Television film
2011	Against the Wall	John Brody	Main role
2012	Flashpoint	Cole	Episode: "A World of Their Own"
2012	A Bride for Christmas	Aiden MacTiernan	Television film (Hallmark Channel)
2012	Finding Mrs. Claus	Myles	Television film (Lifetime)
2014	When Calls the Heart	Billy Hamilton	2 episodes
2014	Wedding Planner Mystery	Aaron Gold	Television film (Hallmark Movies & Mysteries)
2015	Bridal Wave	Luke Griggs	Television film (Hallmark Channel)
2015	Stalker	Coach Baker	Episode: "Lost and Found"
2015	Kept Woman	Evan Crowder	Television film
2015	Debbie Macomber's Dashing Through the Snow	Dash Sutherland	Television film (Hallmark Movies & Mysteries)
2016	Appetite for Love	Clay Hart	Television film (Hallmark Channel)
2016	Date with Love	Vincent Walsh	Television film (Hallmark Channel)
2016	A Dream of Christmas	Stuart Fischer	Television film (Hallmark Channel)
2017	Love on Ice	Spencer Patterson	Television film (Hallmark Channel)
2017	The Perfect Catch	Chase Taynor	Television film (Hallmark Channel)
2017	Love Struck Café	Joe Wainwright	Television film (Hallmark Channel)
2017	Snowed-Inn Christmas	Kevin Jenner	Television film (Lifetime)
2018	My Secret Valentine	Seth Anderson	Television film (Hallmark Channel)
2018	Wedding March 4: Something Old, Something New	Rob Atwell	Television film (Hallmark Channel)
2018	Love in Design	Jeff Winslow	Television film (Hallmark Channel)
2018	A Christmas in Tennessee	Matthew Gilbert	Television film (Lifetime)
2019	Bottled with Love	Nick Everson	Television film (Hallmark Channel)
2019	Merry & Bright	Gabe Carter	Television film (Hallmark Channel)
2019	Christmas on My Mind	Zach Callahan	Television film (Hallmark Movies & Mysteries)
2020	Sweet Autumn	Dex	Television film (Hallmark Movies & Mysteries)
2020	Christmas Tree Lane	Nate	Television film (Hallmark Movies & Mysteries)
2021	The 27-Hour Day	Jack West	Television film (Hallmark Channel)
2021	My Christmas Family Tree	Kristopher	Television film (Hallmark Channel)
2021	An Unexpected Christmas	Tall guy (cameo)	Television film (Hallmark Channel)
2022	Curious Caterer: Dying for Chocolate	Detective Tom Schultz	Television film (Hallmark Movies & Mysteries)
2022	A Maple Valley Christmas	Aaron Davenport	Television film (Hallmark Movies & Mysteries)
2022	Three Wise Men and a Baby	Luke Brenner	Television film (Hallmark Channel)
2023	Curious Caterer: Grilling Season	Detective Tom Schultz	Television film (Hallmark Movies & Mysteries)
2023	A Safari Romance	Tim	Television film (Hallmark Channel)
2023	Curious Caterer: Fatal Vows	Detective Tom Schultz	Television film (Hallmark Movies & Mysteries)
2023	Christmas Island	Oliver MacLeod	Television film (Hallmark Channel)
2024	Curious Caterer: Foiled Again	Detective Tom Schultz	Television film (Hallmark Mystery)
2024	For Love and Honey	Austen	Television film (Hallmark Channel)
2024	Curious Caterer: Forbidden Fruit	Tom	Television film (Hallmark Mystery)
2024	Jingle Bell Run	Wes Cosgrove	Television film (Hallmark Channel)
2024	Three Wiser Men and a Boy	Luke Brenner	Television film (Hallmark Channel)
2025	The Reluctant Royal	Johnny	Television film (Hallmark Channel)
2025	Adventures in Love and Birding	John	Television film (Hallmark Channel)
2025	Three Wisest Men	Luke Brenner	Television film (Hallmark Channel)
2025	Holiday Touchdown: A Bills Love Story	Bartender (cameo)	Television film (Hallmark Channel)
2025	She’s Making a List	Jason	Television film (Hallmark Channel)
2026	Kentucky Roses	Ash	Television film (Hallmark Channel)
