= Andrew Cooper (actor) =

English actor and model

- Born: Andrew Cooper; 24 February 1981 (age 45); Buckinghamshire, England
- Occupations: Actor, model, businessman
- Spouse: Jane Cooper
- Children: 2

Andrew Cooper (born 24 February 1981) is an English actor and model.

== Career ==
Cooper appeared in an advertisement for Diet Coke in 2013. He has appeared in advertisements for several well known brands including Dunhill, Topman, Giorgio Armani, and Paul Smith. Cooper made a move into acting and costarred on the television show The Royals.

He appeared in a Hallmark Channel television movie called Royal Hearts in 2018, opposite Cindy Busby and James Brolin.

== Personal life ==
He is married to Jane Cooper. They have 2 children, daughter Taylor (born 2008) and Jackson (born 2010). The couple own a pet store called The Mutz Nutz, a store that is at the heart of the community and aims to work with the various local charities in re-homing unwanted animals.

In 2016, he launched a cookbook called Juice Manifesto featuring more than 100 recipes for nutritious juices and smoothies.

== Filmography ==
Year	Title	Role	Notes
2014	Citizen Khan	Farmer Khan	
2015	Silent Witness	Joshua	
2015-2017	The Royals	Lord Twysden “Beck” Beckwith II	6 episodes
2017	The Way		TV Miniseries
2017-2018	Damnation	Townsperson	
2018	Royal Hearts	Alex	Hallmark Channel TV Movie
2018	Christmas at the Palace	King Alexander Booth	Hallmark Channel TV Movie
