= Tim Ross (Australian actor) =

Australian actor

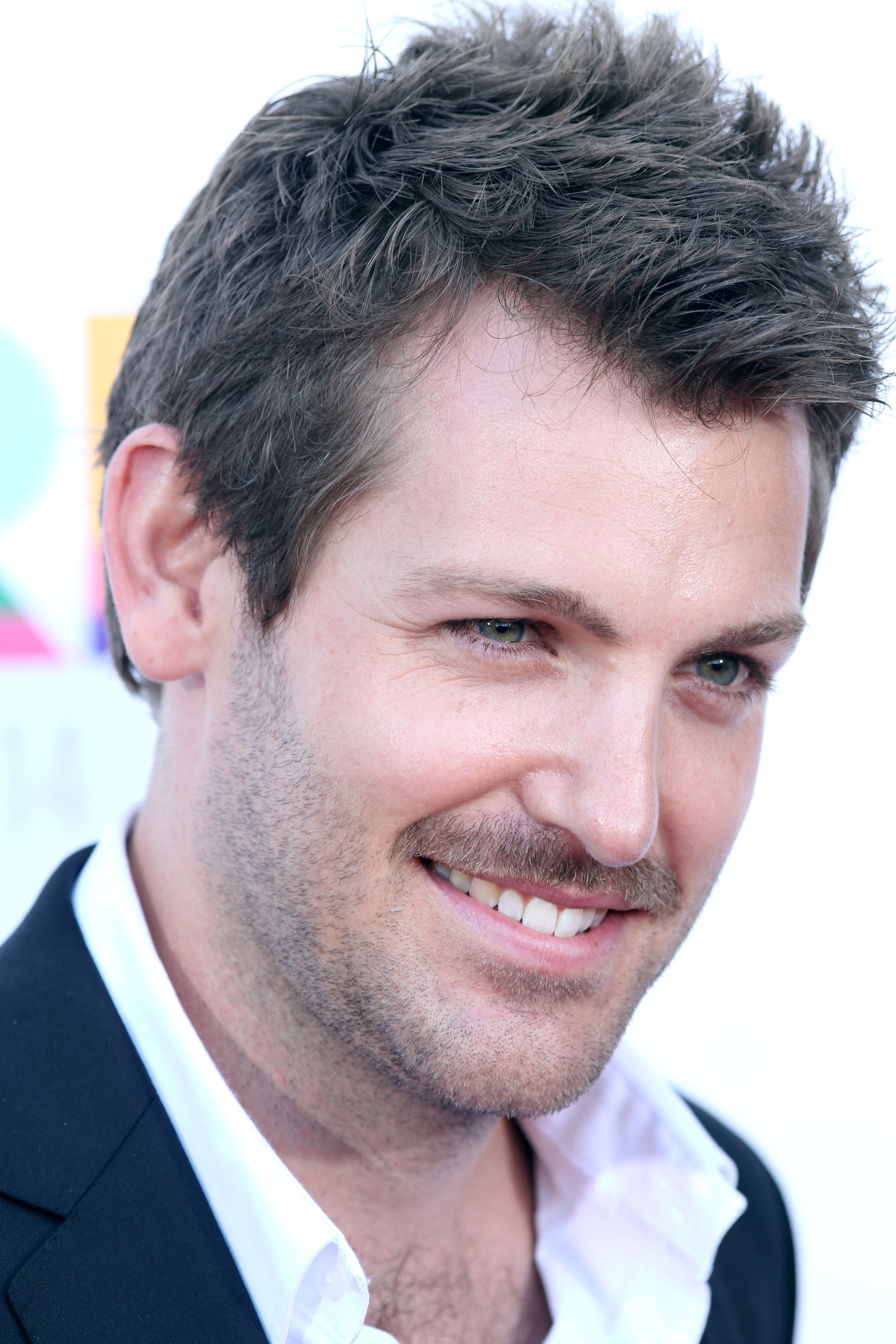
- Ross at the ARIA Music Awards 2014
- Born: Adelaide, South Australia
- Education: Victorian College of the Arts (2007)
- Occupation: Actor
- Years active: 2006–
- Known for: Wonderland; Home and Away; Romance on the Menu
- Children: 2

Tim Ross is an Australian actor best known for having played Steve Beaumont in Wonderland.

== Early life ==
Ross grew up in Adelaide. He developed an interest in acting at school, when he undertook drama classes and landed the lead role in several plays. His teacher encouraged him to focus on acting, and to audition for drama school.

Ross worked as a carpenter for his father in Adelaide, but after falling down a well and breaking his nose, decided to pursue a career in acting. He relocated to Melbourne after being accepted into the Victorian College of the Arts (VCA).

At VCA, he developed his acting skills, performing lead roles in numerous plays, including David Craig in a production of Observe the Sons of Ulster Marching Towards the Somme. He was a recipient of the school's scholarship for demonstration of outstanding commitment to the course and graduated in 2007.

== Career ==
In 2010, Ross became an ensemble member of the Red Stitch Actors Theatre, before making his professional stage debut for the Melbourne Theatre Company, playing Laertes in a production of Hamlet. He followed this with a performance in the world premiere of Return to Earth.

After honing his skills for the screen were developed playing leads in several short films and television commercials, Ross transitioned into television acting. His first small screen role was in soap opera Neighbours, playing opposite Margot Robbie. This was followed with appearances in police procedural series Rush, 2011 crime telemovie Underbelly Files: Tell Them Lucifer was Here (as part of the Underbelly franchise) and British series Mrs Biggs, before he scored a regular role as Steve Beaumont in drama series Wonderland. from 2013 to 2015. During this time, he also had a guest role in The Code in 2014.

In 2016, Ross reunited with Wonderland cast member Ben Mingay to host the game show Cannonball. The following year, he joined the cast of Home and Away, playing James Mayvers, the love interest of Roo Stewart played by Georgie Parker. In 2020, he appeared in Underbelly spin-off miniseries Informer 3838.

Ross's first lead in a feature film was as Simon Cook in 2020 romantic comedy Romance On The Menu (aka Hearts Down Under) opposite Cindy Busby, which aired on Netflix. The film was picked up by the Hallmark Channel in the US and renamed Hearts Down Under for American audiences.

The following year, Ross played the regular roles of Dr Ben Patterson in season 3 of medical drama Harrow and John Martin in Network Ten teen mystery series Dive Club. In 2022, he joined the cast of kids Nickelodeon series Rock Island Mysteries at the end of the first season, playing against type, in a villainous role.

In 2023, Ross had a starring role in the film Romance at the Vineyard, which aired on the Great American Family channel. His other feature film credits include Bloody Hell (2020), The Reef: Stalked (2022), and Ron Howard’s Eden (2024), alongside Jude Law and Ana De Armas.

== Personal life ==
Ross is married with two sons (Bobbles Ross and Bugsy Ross) After having children, Ross and family relocated from Sydney to the Gold Coast, to live in a more 'relaxed environment'.

Between productions, Ross teaches acting for the screen and directing, at the Warehouse Workshop Actors Studio on the Gold Coast and online.

== Filmography ==
=== Film ===
Year	Title	Role	Notes
2009	New Beginnings	Man	Short film
2009	Beatrice, Her Beast and the Man from the City	The Weatherman	Short film
2010	The Laundromat	Brian	Short film
2013	Deep-Seeded	Pete	Short film
2016	Tanglewood	Zach	Short film
2016	Cooped Up	Internet Installer	Feature film
2020	Romance On The Menu (aka Hearts Down Under)	Simon Cook	Feature film
2020	Bloody Hell	John Toole	Feature film
2022	The Reef: Stalked	Greg	Feature film
2023	Romance at the Vineyard	Ethan Blake	Feature film
2024	Eden	Hancock's First Officer	Feature film
2026	All My Friends Are Back in Brisbane	Aram	Feature Film
2026	Spa Weekend	Derek	Post-production

=== Television ===
Year	Title	Role	Notes
2008; 2010	Rush	Will Caruthers	2 episodes
2009	Neighbours	James Linden	6 episodes
2011	Underbelly Files: Tell Them Lucifer was Here	Snr Constable Darren Sherren	TV movie
2012	Mrs Biggs	Colin MacKenzie	1 episode
2013–2015	Wonderland	Steve Beaumont	34 episodes
2016	The Code	Peter	2 episodes
2017	Home and Away	James Mayvers	11 episodes
2020	Informer 3838	Gary 'Chikka' Berich	Miniseries, 2 episodes
2021	Harrow	Dr Ben Patterson	8 episodes
2021	Dive Club	John Martin	8 episodes
2022–2023	Rock Island Mysteries	Professor James	5 episodes

== Theatre ==
Year	Title	Role	Notes	Ref.
2006	Observe the Sons of Ulster Marching Towards the Somme	David Craig	Victorian College of the Arts	
2006	A Midsummer Night’s Dream	Lysander	Victorian College of the Arts	
2006	Our Country’s Good	Harry Brewer	Victorian College of the Arts	
2006	Victory	Ball	Victorian College of the Arts	
2007	The Perjured City	X1	Victorian College of the Arts	
2007	The Venetian Twins	Pancrazio	Victorian College of the Arts	
2007	King Lear	Edmund	Victorian College of the Arts	
2009	On Ego	Derek	Red Stitch Actors Theatre	
2010	Oh Well Never Mind Bye	Fin Ashmore	Red Stitch Actors Theatre	
2011	Howie the Rookie	The Rookie Lee (lead)	Red Stitch Actors Theatre	
2011	Hamlet	Laertes	MTC	
2011	Return to Earth	Tom Waster	MTC	
2012	Stop Rewind	Dim	Tour with Red Stitch Actors Theatre	
2012	Behind Closed Doors	Damien	Tour with Red Stitch Actors Theatre	
2012	The Kitchen Sink	Pete	Red Stitch Actors Theatre	
2013	4000 Miles	Leo (lead)	Red Stitch Actors Theatre	
