= Vanous =

Vanous is a surname. Notable people with the surname include:

- Lucky Vanous (born 1961), American model and actor

== See also ==
- Jaromír Vaňous (born 1955), Czech racewalker
