= Into the White =

- Directed by: Petter Næss
- Written by: Ole Meldgaard; Dave Mango; Petter Næss
- Produced by: Peter Aalbæk Jensen; Valerie Edwina Saunders
- Starring: Stig Henrik Hoff; David Kross; Florian Lukas; Lachlan Nieboer; Rupert Grint
- Cinematography: Daniel Voldheim
- Edited by: Frida Eggum Michaelsen
- Music by: Nils Petter Molvaer
- Production companies: Zentropa International Norway; Film i Väst; Trollhättan Film AB; Zentropa Entertainments
- Distributed by: Scanbox Entertainment
- Release dates: 4 March 2012 (Filmfest Oslo); 9 March 2012 (Norway); 29 August 2013 (Sweden: DVD premiere)
- Running time: 104 minutes
- Countries: Norway; Sweden
- Languages: English; Norwegian; German
- Box office: $712,216 (worldwide)

Into the White (also known as Comrade, Lost in the Snow and Cross of Honour in the United Kingdom) is a 2012 wartime survival film directed by Petter Næss, written by Ole Meldgaard, Dave Mango and Petter Næss, and starring David Kross, Stig Henrik Hoff, Florian Lukas, Rupert Grint and Lachlan Nieboer. Loosely based on a real incident that occurred during the Norwegian campaign of World War II, the film follows a group of Royal Navy and Luftwaffe aviators who must cooperate to survive after crash-landing in remote Norway.

== Plot ==
On 27 April 1940, a Luftwaffe Heinkel He 111 and a Fleet Air Arm Blackburn Skua engage each other but crash near Grotli, Norway. Pilot Leutnant Horst Schopis (Florian Lukas), Feldwebel Wolfgang Strunk (Stig Henrik Hoff), and Obergefreiter Josef Schwartz (David Kross) survive the He 111's crash-landing and attempt to reach German lines, but lose their supplies and are stranded in a hunter's cabin during a snowstorm. While there, they hear Captain Charles P. Davenport (Lachlan Nieboer) and his air gunner Robert Smith (Rupert Grint), the British aviators aboard the Skua, approaching the cabin. Horst allows them into the cabin as prisoners of war, divides the room roughly in half between them, and shares their only food, a morsel of oatmeal, with the British. They use wooden furniture in the cabin as firewood, and Horst takes Davenport's lighter, a gift from his father, to light it, promising to return it afterward.

After an attempt to find help the next day, Smith steals Josef's gun and orders Horst and Strunk to disarm themselves. While Smith and Strunk attempt to hunt for food, Davenport orders Horst to chop down what turns out to be the main support beam in the middle of the cabin, causing the roof to cave in before Horst and Davenport hold up the roof atop tables. When Smith and Strunk return with just a rabbit, Horst takes Davenport's gun and a standoff occurs before the Germans and British decide they must work together to survive and put their weapons in a box. After agreeing to cooperate, the Germans and British gradually befriend each other, improved when Strunk uncovers a stash of dried meat and alcohol under a floorboard, which they share. Josef's arm, which was injured in the crash, becomes infected with gangrene, and the men give him alcohol before amputating his arm with an axe.

The next day, Smith and Strunk set out on skis to determine where to travel. Meanwhile, a Norwegian Army scout locates the He 111, and a Norwegian Army unit is dispatched to search the area for the downed aviators. When they spot Smith and Strunk skiing to the cabin, a Norwegian sniper shoots and kills Strunk, while Norwegian soldiers capture Smith, Davenport, Horst, and Josef. At a Norwegian military base, Smith and Davenport are interrogated and accused of being collaborators, worsened when Horst returns Davenport's lighter in front of the Norwegians. When a Norwegian officer threatens to report Smith and Davenport to their superiors, Davenport snaps, insults the officer, and explains they were simply trying to survive. Smith and Davenport are released, while Horst and Josef are taken away in a canoe pending transport to a prisoner-of-war camp, and Davenport and Horst exchange a glance.

Epilogue intertitles state that Horst and Schwartz became prisoners of war in Canada, while Smith and Davenport returned to combat action but were shot down in their very next flight, killing Smith. In 1977, Horst receives a call at his home in Munich from Davenport, who also survived the war and invites him to London.

== Cast ==
- Stig Henrik Hoff as Feldwebel Wolfgang Strunk, portraying the real life Karl-Heinz Strunk
- David Kross as Obergefreiter Josef Schwartz, portraying the real life Josef Auchthor
- Florian Lukas as Leutnant Horst Schopis, portraying the same person in real life
- Lachlan Nieboer as Captain Charles P. Davenport, portraying the real life Captain R.T. Partridge
- Rupert Grint as Gunner Robert Smith, portraying the real life Lieutenant R.S. Bostock
- Kim Haugen as Second Lieutenant Bjørn Gustavsen (Norwegian ski patrol)
- Knut Joner as Private Harald Gustavsen (Norwegian ski patrol)
- Morten Faldaas as Terje (Norwegian ski patrol)
- Sondre Krogtoft Larsen as Kjell (Norwegian ski patrol)

== Production ==
Although a realistic mock-up of a Heinkel He 111 bomber is used, nearly all of the production is set in a cabin with only occasional exterior scenes, prompting one reviewer to note that the film was more like a play. Filming began 28 March 2011 with three weeks of shooting in Grotli, Norway, near where the actual events occurred, with some scenes being shot in Trollhättan and Brålanda, Sweden. The finished film was released in March 2012.

== Historical accuracy ==
=== Actual events ===
The film account is loosely based on historical events, although the British characters' names are changed. Captain R.T. Partridge is renamed Charles P. Davenport and Lieutenant R.S. Bostock became Robert Smith. The German characters' names bear more resemblance to the names of their real-life counterparts. Three British Royal Navy Blackburn Skuas operating from HMS Ark Royal attacked the Heinkel He 111 and knocked out the Germans' port engine. The German aircraft crashed 1,000 meters above sea level in a remote mountain area, miles from any major road. The German tail gunner Hans Hauck was dead when the bomber crashed.

Captain R.T. Partridge, squadron leader of the 800 Naval Air Squadron, Fleet Air Arm, experienced a failing engine in his Skua and glided down to land on a frozen lake. He had seen a small hut nearby and he and his radio operator, Lieutenant Bostock, hiked through heavy snow to the deserted reindeer hunters' cabin. A few minutes later, they were alerted by a whistle and saw the three survivors of the German Heinkel armed with pistols and knives. Speaking broken German and English, the British managed to persuade the Germans that they were the crew of a Vickers Wellington bomber, rather than the fighter that had shot them down. The Germans believed that they had been shot down by a Supermarine Spitfire.

In Luftkampfgegner wurden Freunde ("Air combat opponents became friends"), Horst Schopis wrote in his memoirs:

As it was getting dark Captain Partridge suggested that the Germans stay in the hut. The two British officers left and found a small chalet, which turned out to be the Grotli Hotel, which was closed for the winter. The German crew arrived the next morning and shared breakfast. It was agreed that the Captain R. T. Partridge and the German Karl-Heinz Strunk would try to locate other people. They met a Norwegian ski patrol. Strunk shouted out "Ingleesh". The Norwegian patrol fired a warning shot at which Partridge fell to the ground and Strunk placed his hands on his head. Lieutenant Bostock emerged from the hotel, suspecting that the German had shot Partridge, but instead saw Strunk apparently reaching for his pistol. One of the Norwegians, seeing this, shot him.

The two German survivors—Hauptmann Schopis and mechanic Joseph Auchtor—were taken over the mountains to Stryn as prisoners. Later they were sent to Britain and on to a prison camp in Canada, where they remained until 1947. The German tail gunner Hans Hauck was given a memorial stone which still stands near the Grotli Hotel. Strunk was initially buried in the Skjåk Church cemetery, then later transferred to the war cemetery in Trondheim.

The British had some difficulty in convincing the Norwegians of their nationality until they showed the tailor's label on their uniforms and found a British half-crown coin. By sheer coincidence the commander of the Norwegian patrol turned out to be a brother-in-law of a friend of Captain Partridge. The two freed British airmen hiked into Ålesund, which was being defended by Royal Marines under heavy Luftwaffe bombing. As the destroyer scheduled to evacuate the British force failed to arrive, they commandeered a car and drove to the port of Åndalsnes, where they were eventually returned to the United Kingdom by the cruiser HMS Manchester.

Captain Partridge and Lieutenant Bostock took part in the attempt to sink the German battleship Scharnhorst on 13 June 1940. Partridge was shot down near Stallvik in the Trondheimsfjord and captured by German troops. Lieutenant Bostock was killed in another Blackburn Skua on the same raid.

Both the German pilot Horst Schopis and the British pilot R.T. Partridge wrote books about their experiences before, during and after the war, entitled Luftkampfgegner wurden Freunde and Operation Skua.

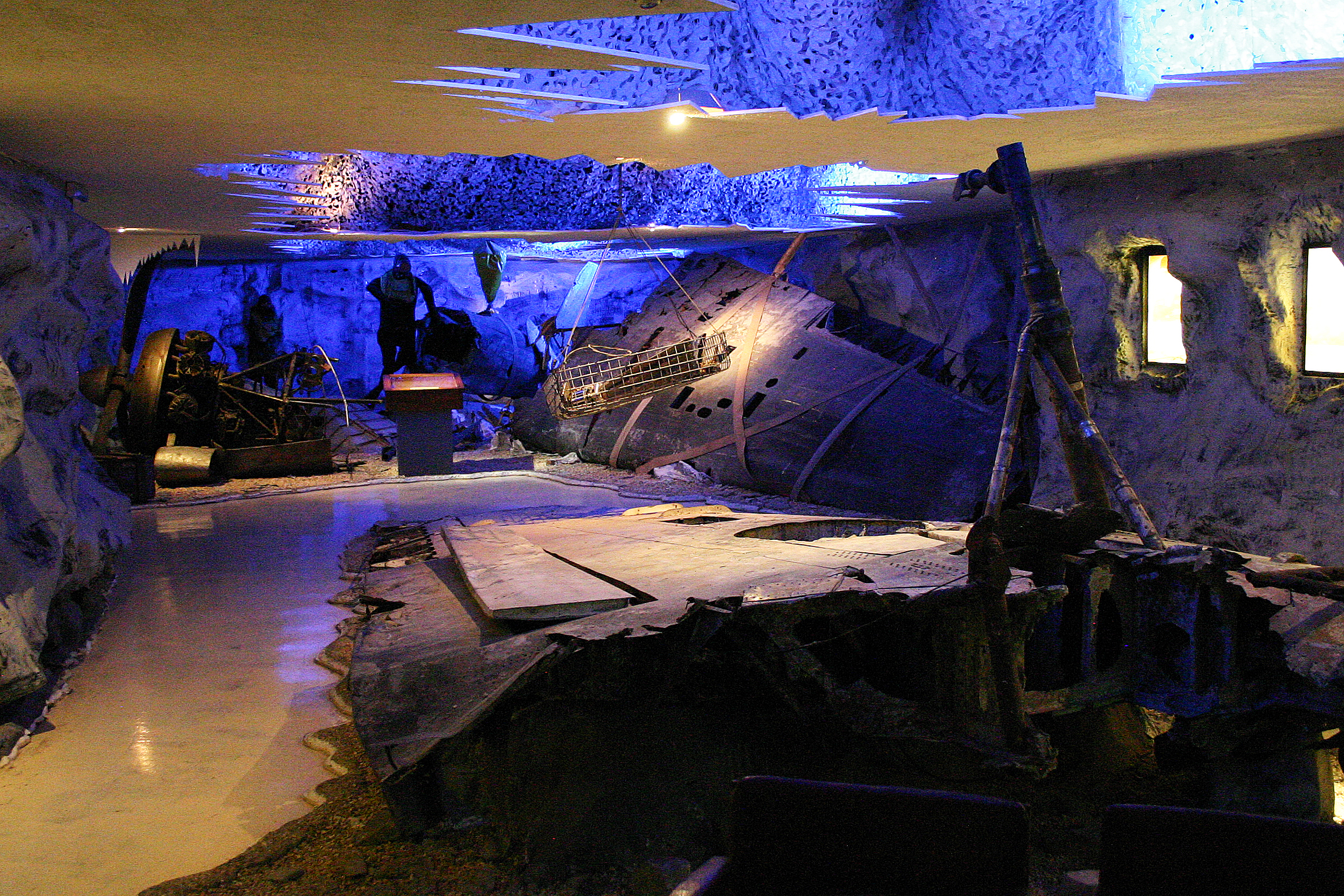
Blackburn Skua L2940 wreck on display at the Fleet Air Arm Museum

In 1974, the original L2940 was recovered from Breidalsvatnet lake near Grotli in Skjåk Municipality and the wreck is on display at the Fleet Air Arm Museum in Yeovilton. The original Heinkel wreck remains in the mountains at Grotli around 1,000 metres above sea level, left untouched in the snow.

In 1974 and 2004, Horst Schopis visited Grotli, but died in 2011 at 99 years of age, one year before the film's release. British captain R.T. Partridge visited Grotli in 1974 and died in 1990.

== Release and reception ==
Into the White premiered at the Filmfest Oslo in March 2012 and was subsequently widely released in Norway where it grossed $636,469. In the US, the film had a limited release in select theatres.

Critical reviews were mixed, with some reviewers noting that the atmosphere and setting dominated to the detriment of the plot. Neil Lumbard in his review for DVD Talk, commented: "The entirety of the film revolves around a somewhat simplistic plot element, which is based on actual historical events, but doesn't engage much beyond the central concept of the film ... The film is slow paced and for some audience members this is an obvious detriment."

As of April 2022, the film has an approval rating of 7.1 out of 10 at IMDb and has a rating of 45% at Rotten Tomatoes.

Årets lyddesign, Nikolai Linck and Andreas Kongsgaard were nominated for an Amanda Award for Best Sound Design for their work on Into the White.

== Home media ==
Into the White was released on DVD and Blu-ray on 28 August 2012 in Norway.
