= Diet Coke Break =

Advertising campaign for Diet Coke

- Lucky Vanous starred in the first Diet Coke Break advert
- Agency: Lowe & Partners/SMS; McCann-Erickson Worldwide; Leo Burnett Company; Vallance Carruthers Coleman Priest; BETC London
- Client: The Coca-Cola Company
- Language: English
- Product: Diet Coke
- Release date: 1994 (television)
- Written by: Lee Garfinkel; Clive Pickering; Neil Dawson
- Directed by: Jeremiah Chechik; Joe Roman; Rocky Morton
- Music by: Etta James; Jocelyn Brown
- Starring: Lucky Vanous; Robert Merrill; Nancy Meyer; Jenna Stern; Paul Johansson; Francois Xavier; Andrew Cooper
- Official website: www.dietcoke.com

The Diet Coke Break advertising campaign is a series of six television advertisements that ran from 1994 to 2013, used to promote the soft drink Diet Coke. Each advert centers around a group of women ogling an attractive man while he works, soundtracked to a version of "I Just Want to Make Love to You". The first commercial premiered on US television in 1994, and starred American actor Lucky Vanous as a handsome construction worker who removes his shirt while taking his "Diet Coke break". The advert was a huge success, catching The Coca-Cola Company by surprise. Although initially no sequel was planned, Vanous was recast in a follow-up advert, released the next year.

Two further adverts premiered in 1997: the first, 11.30 Appointment, depicts women in an office gazing lustfully at a window cleaner, while in the second, Dispenser, a delivery man is the object of attention. The campaign went into hiatus for 10 years, before returning with a new advert in 2007, in an attempt to reposition Diet Coke towards its female consumers. The commercial, Lift, follows a group of women who deliberately get trapped in an elevator in order to be rescued by an attractive technician. The final Diet Coke Break advert, Gardener, was released in 2013, and starred Andrew Cooper as a hunky gardener. Gardener became the most popular piece of advertising that Diet Coke had produced for 20 years, and was the first non-US made Coca-Cola advert to be shown during the Oscars.

The Diet Coke Break campaign is remembered as being one of the earliest examples of gender roles being swapped in TV advertising, with women objectifying attractive men, rather than the other way around – it has been described as "much loved" and "truly iconic". The campaign has also generated criticism over whether its adverts are sexist towards men. Dispenser was pulled off the air by the Canadian government, who felt that the commercial was demeaning to men. Similarly, in 2013 Gardener was included in a list of "sexist male adverts".

== History ==
=== Adverts ===
As of November 2020, the Diet Coke Break campaign has included six television adverts.

==== Diet Coke Break (1994) ====
The original Diet Coke Break advert was produced by Lowe & Partners/SMS on a $70 million account, and was one of seven television commercials to carry Diet Coke's new "This is refreshment" theme. The advert was directed by Jeremiah Chechik and written by Lee Garfinkel, and premiered on US television in 1994. Diet Coke Break depicts a group of women working in an office in a skyscraper. At 11:30 a.m., they excitedly call each other over to a window, to watch a handsome construction worker (Vanous) as he takes his "Diet Coke break". The construction worker removes his shirt and drinks a can of Diet Coke as the women ogle him. The advert is soundtracked by "I Just Want to Make Love to You" by Etta James.

The advert became a success, leading to Target Based Marketing in Dallas producing a Diet Coke Break screensaver, of which The Coca-Cola Company distributed 33,000 copies to computer users through both direct mail and a promotion with 134 radio stations.

==== Magazine (1995) ====
Despite not initially planning for a sequel, Coca-Cola launched a second Diet Coke Break advert in June the following year. The commercial, Magazine, saw Vanous return to his role as the Diet Coke hunk – he portrayed a model brought to life from the pages of a fashion magazine by a woman drinking a Diet Coke. The advert was created by the Toronto office of McCann-Erickson Worldwide.

==== 11.30 Appointment (1997) ====
The campaign returned two years later in 1997 with two new commercials. The first of these was titled 11.30 Appointment, and starred the actor Robert Merrill. The sequence features a group of women arriving at the reception area of an office building, each one for their "11:30 appointment", then sitting in a room with a large window. At 11:30 a.m., an attractive shirtless window cleaner (Merrill) is lifted in a suspended platform past the window while drinking a can of Diet Coke. The women gaze at him longingly, with one (Nancy Meyer) remarking: "No wonder it's so hard to get an appointment here." Speaking about being cast in the advert, Merrill described it as "the job that everybody wanted".

==== Dispenser (1997) ====
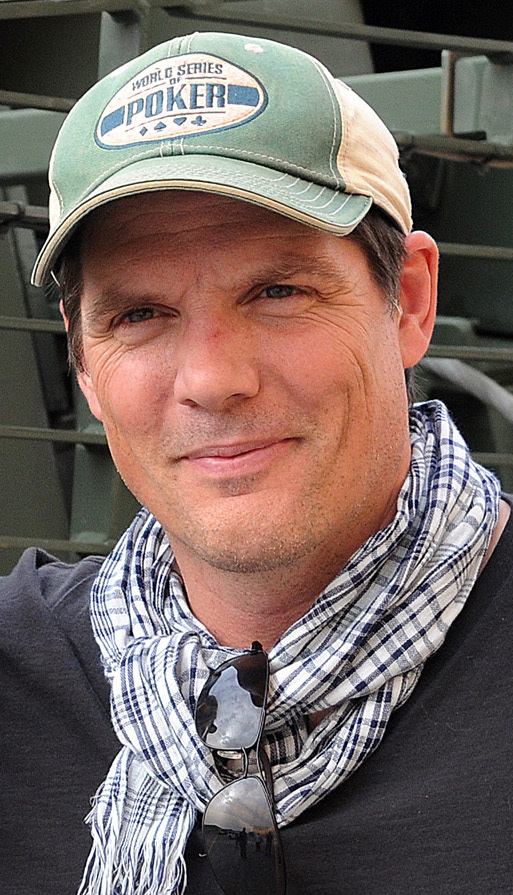
Paul Johansson starred in Dispenser, the fourth Diet Coke Break advert.

The fourth Diet Coke Break advert, Dispenser, premiered in the US during the 69th Academy Awards on March 24, 1997, the same year as 11.30 Appointment. As with the previous two commercials, it is set in an office with a female workforce. At exactly 11:30 a.m., a handsome delivery man (Paul Johansson) carrying two cases of Diet Coke exits an elevator on the women's floor. As the women stare at him, he places the cases down then takes a drink from one of the cans.

Dispenser was created by the Milan office of the Leo Burnett Company, and had already been introduced into the French and Spanish markets by the time it was released in the US. The advert received a UK release the following month. Dispenser became the first Diet Coke Break advert in which the man kept his shirt on.

==== Lift (2007) ====
After Dispenser, Diet Coke Break commercials went into hiatus for ten years. Following the UK release of Coke Zero in 2006—which was deliberately being marketed at men—the campaign returned with a new advert, Lift, to repromote Diet Coke towards the brand's female consumers. An international search to find a new "hunk" began in 2006. Francois Xavier—an economics graduate from Lille—was subsequently cast to star in the advert. It was directed by Joe Roman and filmed in Buenos Aires, and formed part of a wider campaign created by the advertising agency Vallance Carruthers Coleman Priest, which included billboards, online and press advertising.

Lift follows three women working in an office. Each carrying a can of Diet Coke, they enter an elevator and intentionally press the emergency call button. A technician (Xavier) sees the women on a CCTV monitor, and leaves his post to free them from the elevator. After descending from an emergency hatch in the ceiling, he releases the three women, who return to their desks. As with earlier Diet Coke Break adverts, Lift was soundtracked by "I Just Want to Make Love to You" – however, rather than James's original version, a new recording by Jocelyn Brown was used instead. The commercial premiered on British channel Five Life on January 22, 2007.

==== Gardener (2013) ====
To celebrate the 30th anniversary of the Diet Coke's launch in Europe, the Diet Coke Break campaign returned in 2013 with a sixth and, as of 2020, final advert, titled Gardener. In the commercial, a group of women are sitting in a park drinking Diet Coke and watching an attractive gardener (Andrew Cooper) as he mows the grass. One woman rolls a can of Diet Coke to him, which hits his lawnmower. She gestures to him to drink from the can, which fizzes the soda all over him when he opens it. The women laugh at the gardener, at which he removes his T-shirt, revealing his muscular torso underneath. As the women gape at him in disbelief, the gardener walks away with a smile on his face. Unlike Lift, James's version of "I Just Want to Make Love to You" returned as the advert's soundtrack.

Gardener was created by advertising agency BETC London, and ran in more than 10 countries across Europe. It was written by Neil Dawson and Clive Pickering, and was directed by Rocky Morton. A teaser for the advert was uploaded to Diet Coke's official Facebook page at 11:30 a.m. on January 28, 2013 – it was subsequently shared online more than 41,500 times. Once released onto television, the commercial became the most popular piece of advertising that Diet Coke had produced for 20 years, and was the first non-US made Coca-Cola advert to be shown during the Oscars.

=== Retirement ===
By 2015 it was perceived that the Diet Coke Break campaign did not "represent the values of modern confident women", and the adverts were retired. In their place, a new campaign was launched encouraging women to "regret nothing". Promoting this new campaign, Bobby Brittain, the marketing strategy and activation director of Coca-Cola Great Britain, described the Diet Coke Break adverts as "much loved". Matthew Charlton, CEO of creative agency Brothers & Sisters, called the campaign "one of the most famous global advertising ideas ever created and a genuine creative franchise".

== Reception ==
The Diet Coke Break campaign is remembered as one of the earliest examples of gender roles being swapped in TV advertising, with women objectifying attractive men, rather than the other way around. The success of the original advert caught Coca-Cola by surprise, with Vanous remarking: "Neither I nor anyone else had any idea the commercial would cause this stir." Nancy Gibson, Diet Coke's worldwide brand director, stated that they were "thrilled" by the response to the advert. Following the success of the first Diet Coke Break commercial in the UK, its soundtrack—"I Just Want to Make Love to You" by Etta James—was re-released on CD single on January 29, 1996, and peaked at number five on the UK Singles Chart. In 2005, the song was ranked at number 29 in Channel 4's one-off program Advertising's Greatest Hits.

The adverts also generated criticism over whether they were sexist against men. When Dispenser was broadcast in Canada, the national government felt that it was demeaning to men and pulled it off the air. Speaking in 2001 about his part in the Diet Coke Break campaign, Vanous remarked: "I felt very uncomfortable with that role as a sex object. Then I realized it's just part of the game." In 2013, the British newspaper The Daily Telegraph included Gardener in an article on "sexist male adverts", citing a debate on the Internet forum Mumsnet over whether it objectified men. Speaking in 2001, TV presenter Lowri Turner remarked: "It was reverse sexism, but, having said that, it was also quite a bit of fun and I quite enjoyed it."

== Awards ==
In 1998, at the UK's 4th National Television Awards, 11.30 Appointment won in the category for Most Popular Advertisement; Merrill attended the ceremony and accepted the trophy.

Year	Award	Category	Result	Ref.
1998	National Television Awards	Most Popular Advertisement	Won	

== Legacy ==
To celebrate the 20th anniversary of the first Diet Coke Break advert, a £3.5 million multimedia marketing campaign was launched in 2014. The campaign spanned television, radio, print and social media, and included Gardener returning to British television. The advert was also recreated on February 13, 2014, in a stunt at London's Finsbury Avenue Square, which was transformed into a live "hunk experience" with 20 shirtless male models.

== Parodies ==
Since it premiered in 1994, the Diet Coke Break campaign has been parodied in adverts for other companies. In 1999, 11.30 Appointment was parodied in an advert for the British beer John Smith's. As in 11.30 Appointment, the advert shows a topless version of John Smith's mascot (the cardboard cut-out "No Nonsense Man") being lifted in a suspended platform past the window of an office boardroom in a skyscraper. A narrator (John Thomson) asks: "Could this be the smoothest way to advertise John Smith's Extra Smooth?" The camera then pulls back to reveal that the room's only occupant is an uninterested cleaner vacuuming the floor, to which the narrator answers: "... No."

Seventeen years later, the water company Icelandic Glacial parodied Diet Coke Break in a 2016 advert for their spring water. Like Diet Coke Break, the advert begins with a group of women in an office excitedly telling other: "It's 10:30." As they gather to look out of a window, an attractive surfer (Brock O'Hurn) emerges from the sea, removes his wetsuit and drinks a bottle of water, as the workers ogle at him. The Huffington Post praised Icelandic Glacial for giving the original Diet Coke advert a "queer makeover" by making one of the people at the window a man.

In 2019, the car manufacturer Vauxhall Motors also parodied Diet Coke Break to promote their new Astra Light model. The advert begins similarly to Diet Coke Break, with women working in an office excitedly telling each other that it is "Break time" and then gathering at a window. However, rather than gazing at a handsome man, the women are instead watching an Astra Light being driven around a parking lot. Promoting the new advert, marketing director Patrick Fourniol described the original Diet Coke Break advert as "truly iconic".

The campaign was also referenced in "The Red Door", the fourth episode of the British sitcom The IT Crowd. In the episode, the character Jen distracts a pair of female workers in an office by telling them there is a builder outside taking off his shirt, "like in ads". After the women run over to the window to look at the shirtless man, it is revealed that he is actually overweight and unattractive.
