= Martin Wimbush =

British actor (1949 - 2024)

- Born: 1949; London, England, UK
- Died: 1 December 2024 (aged 74–75); Rye, East Sussex
- Education: Guildhall School of Music and Drama
- Occupation: Actor
- Partner: Marie

Martin Wimbush (1949 – 1 December 2024) was a British actor known for his roles in film, television, and theatre.

== Early life and education ==
Born in London, Wimbush trained at the Guildhall School of Music and Drama between 1967 and 1969, and then worked extensively in regional theatre, before going into television and then later into film.

== Career ==
His television appearances include Upstairs, Downstairs (1975), The Glittering Prizes (1976), Happy Ever After (1976), Agony (1981), Educating Marmalade (1982), No Problem! (1983), Terry and June (1983), Boon (1986), Lovejoy (1993), Hale and Pace (1993), Then Churchill Said to Me (1993), The Old Curiosity Shop (1995), A Dance to the Music of Time (1997), Vanity Fair (1998), Randall and Hopkirk (2000), Micawber (2001), The Iron Duke (2002), The Lost Prince (2003), Born and Bred (2003), Cape Wrath (2007), Garrow's Law (2009), EastEnders (2010), and Hustle (2012).

Wimbush appeared in the films Orlando (1992), Gangster No. 1 (2000), Mean Machine (2001), Bridget Jones's Diary (2001), Ali G Indahouse (2002), Wimbledon (2004), The Iron Lady (2012), and Scar Tissue (2012).

His stage appearances included The Rev. Mr. Crisparkle in Drood at the Savoy Theatre (1987), Dr Mandril in City of Angels at the Prince of Wales Theatre (1993), Parchester in Me and My Girl at the Alexandra Theatre, Birmingham (2001), Alderman Fitzwarren in Dick Whittington at the Civic Theatre in Aylesbury (2002), Baron Hardup in Cinderella at the Royal Spa Centre in Leamington Spa (2004), Brassett in Charley's Aunt at the Northcott Theatre (2004), and Rupert Matthew in Moonshadow at Jerwood Space (2005).

== Personal life ==
Wimbush lived in Wandsworth London, and Rye East Sussex. He died on 1 December 2024 from motor neurone disease.

== Filmography ==
=== Film ===
Year	Title	Role	Notes
1992	Orlando	Second Official	
2000	Gangster No. 1	Judge	
2000	Sorted	Custom's Business Man	
2001	Mean Machine	Z	
2002	AKA	Reed Furnish	
2002	Ali G Indahouse	MP	
2011	The Iron Lady	Cabinet Ministers	
2012	Anna Karenina	Anna's Doctor	
2013	Scar Tissue	Dr. Whittaker	
2015	The Honourable Rebel	Varley	

=== Television ===
Year	Title	Role	Notes
1975	Ten from the Twenties	Mr. Coxhead	Episode: "The Fifty Pound Notes"
1975	Upstairs, Downstairs	Andrew Bouverie	Episode: "The Nine Days Wonder"
1976	The Glittering Prizes	Freddie	Episode: "A Love Life"
1976	Happy Ever After	Lord James	Episode: "It's All in the Title"
1977	Jubilee	Captain Victor Isitt	Episode: "No Name, No Pack Drill"
1977	The Foundation	Priest	Episode: "Finesse"
1979	Canned Laughter	Lloyd	Television film
1980	Grandad	Vicar	Episode #2.1
1980	Escape	Ian Smith	Episode: "The Cartland Murder"
1981	Agony	Chaplain	Television film
1982	Legacy of Murder	Clive Danvers-Crichton	4 episodes
1982	Educating Marmalade	Latin Master	Episode: "Marmalade at Eton"
1983	No Problem!	Vicar	Episode: "The Willesden One"
1983	The Boy Who Won the Pools	Reverend Meachling	Episode #1.9
1983	Dramarama	Gorgeous George	Episode: "The Young Person's Guide to Getting Their Ball Back!"
1983	Terry and June	Nigel	Episode: "Too Many Cooks"
1985	Who, Sir? Me, Sir?	Piers Plumpton	5 episodes
1985	Star Quality: Mr. and Mrs. Edgehill	Henry Ceram	Television film
1986	Boon	Harris	Episode: "Full Circle"
1986	Kir Royal	Dr. Carl Friedemann	Episode: "Wer reinkommt, ist drin"
1986	Call Me Mister	Second Board director	Episode: "Frozen Assets"
1986	Mixed Doubles	Registrar	Episode: "If at First You Don't Succeed"
1987	Scoop	London - Dinner Guests	Television film
1988	Helping Henry	Cosmic 2	6 episodes
1992	Natural Lies	Graves	Episode #1.3
1992	ScreenPlay	Jeremy	Episode: "The Countess Alice"
1993	Lovejoy	Ben	Episode: "Taking the Pledge"
1993	The Inspector Alleyn Mysteries	Benningden	Episode: "A Man Lay Dead"
1995	The Old Curiosity Shop	Codlin	Television film
1997	Holding On	Tina's Foster Father	Episode #1.5
1998	Vanity Fair	Jewellery Proprietor	Episode #1.2
1999	The Mystery of Men	Vicar	Television film
2000	Randall and Hopkirk (Deceased)	Head Waiter	Episode: "Drop Dead"
2001–2002	Micawber	Mr. Smee the Bootman	3 episodes
2003	The Lost Prince	Violinist	Television film
2003	Born and Bred	Mr. Underhill	Episode: "The Last Hurrah: Part 1"
2004	He Knew He Was Right	British Minister	Episode: "Part 4"
2005	Hiroshima: BBC History of World War II	General Sir Alan Brooke	Television documentary
2007	Cape Wrath	Futra-Chem Chairperson	Episode #1.7
2009	Garrow's Law	Obstetrician	Episode #1.1
2010	EastEnders	Vicar	Episode dated 18 February 2010
2012	Hustle	Sheldon Greyshot	Episode: "Curiosity Caught the Kat"
2013	Strike Back	Vicar	Episode: "Shadow Warfare: Part 5"
2013	The Thirteenth Tale	Peter Lomax	Television film
2014	The Trial	Justice Drake	Television film
2015	The Outcast	Magistrate	Episode #1.1
2017	Taboo	Taboo	Episode #1.1
2017	Decline and Fall	Judge	Episode #1.3
2018	Royal Hearts	Royal Hearts	Television film
2019	Call the Midwife	Judge	Episode #8.8
2019	Good Omens	Mr. Scroggie	Episode: "The Doomsday Option"
2019	The Crown	Ronald Bodley Scott	Episode: "Cri de Coeur"
