= Peter Bensley =

Australian actor

- Born: 6 February 1954 (age 72); Warialda, New South Wales, Australia
- Occupations: Actor, author
- Years active: 1973–present
- Known for: Dr. John Austin in The New Adventures of Black Beauty; Chief Inspector Jeff Hawker in Water Rats; Andrew Teigan in Mirror, Mirror; Dr Mike Newman in The Young Doctors; Matt Delaney in Prisoner; Andrew Foley in Home and Away

Peter Bensley (born 6 February 1954) is an Australian actor.

== Career ==
=== Television and film ===
One of Bensley's earliest roles was as Dennis Braithwaite on the Seven Network drama series Class of '75. He also appeared in ABC Television children's show, Waterloo Street. In 1976, he appeared in an episode of Rush, followed by a guest appearances in Chopper Squad and Tickled Pink in 1978.

Bensley appeared in several Grundy Television soap operas, starting with The Restless Years in 1979. He then took on his one of his most well known roles as Dr. Mike Newman in The Young Doctors from 1980. After The Young Doctors was cancelled in 1983, Bensley played the title role of Stanley Dunstan in the 1984 comedy film Stanley. He had to have his hair cut short for the role and he did his own stunts. He followed this with a stint in Prisoner in 1984 as Matt Delaney, one of the three male prisoners.

In 1986, Bensley played Tony Chapman in Neighbours. He joined Home and Away in 1988 as school teacher Andrew Foley. In 1992, he appeared as Dr. John Austin in the Australian miniseries The New Adventures of Black Beauty. Two years later, he guested in the G.P. episode "Ties of the Blood". The following year, he played Andrew Teigan, father of Jo Teigan, in the Australian/New Zealand co-production Mirror, Mirror.

Bensley starred as Chief Inspector Jeff Hawker in the police procedural drama series Water Rats for the entire run from 1996 until 2001. In 2009, he returned to Neighbours for a two-episode guest role as Dean Naughton. Bensley appeared in the 2020 romantic comedy Romance on the Menu.

=== Advertisements ===
In the 1980s, Bensley appeared as a nude centrefold in Cleo magazine wearing only strategically placed scuba gear. He also featured in an advertisement for Palmolive Gold, in which he is seen in bed with fellow The Young Doctors actress Judy McBurney, and semi-naked in a shower.

== Author ==
His first fiction book, On a Wing and a Prayer, was published in 2006.

== Personal life ==
Bensley and his partner have 3 children.

== Filmography ==
=== Film ===
Year	Title	Role	Notes
1984	Stanley	Stanley	Feature film
2010	Tangerine	Alex	Short film
2017	Don't Tell	Karen's Father	Feature film
2020	Romance on the Menu	Dale Whitely	Feature film

=== Television ===
Year	Title	Role	Notes
1975	Class of 74	Dennis Braithwaite	Series regular
1976	Rush	Patsey O'Halloran	Episode: "Welcome Back Sergeant McKellar"
1978	Chopper Squad	Vince	Episode: "A Pride of Lions"
1978	Tickled Pink	Penny	Episode: "The Family Business"
1979	The Restless Years		TV series
1979	Cop Shop	Gary Sinclair	Episode 186
1980–1983	The Young Doctors	Dr Mike Newman	Series regular
1984–1985	Prisoner	Matt Delaney	Recurring
1986	Neighbours	Tony Chapman	Recurring
1988–1990	Home and Away	Andrew Foley	Recurring
1991–1994	G.P.	Dean Noonan	Episodes: "Nowhere to Run", "Ties of the Blood"
1992	Round the Twist	Mr Shelford	Episode: "Nails"
1992	Police Rescue	Phil Dorrick	Episode: "The Hard Way"
1992	The Time Game	Electricity Serviceman	TV film
1992–1994	The New Adventures of Black Beauty	Dr. John Austin	Recurring
1994	Ship to Shore	Taxi Driver	Guest
1994	Paradise Beach	Martin Taylor	Episode 130
1995	Mirror, Mirror	Andrew Tiegan	Series regular
1996–2001	Water Rats	Chief Inspector Jeff Hawker	Series regular
1997	Roar	Alwyn	Episode: "The Eternal"
2001	Corridors of Power	Mail Man	Recurring
2009	Neighbours	Dean Naughton	Guest
2009–2010	Packed to the Rafters	Derek	Recurring
2010	Cops LAC	Chief Superintendent	Episode: "The Killer Wore Sneakers"

=== As director ===
Year	Title	Notes
1992	Steam Across the Mountain	
