= Romance on the Menu =

- Film poster
- Directed by: Rosie Lourde
- Written by: Alison Spuck McNeeley; Casie Tabanou; Joey Vieira
- Produced by: Steve Jaggi; Spencer McLaren
- Starring: Cindy Busby; Tim Ross; Naomi Sequeira
- Cinematography: Jason Hargreaves
- Edited by: Charlotte Cutting; Adrian Powers
- Music by: Jazz D'Arcy
- Production company: The Steve Jaggi Company
- Distributed by: Filmink Presents (Australia); Koan (worldwide)
- Release date: 24 September 2020
- Country: Australia
- Language: English

Romance on the Menu is a 2020 Australian romantic comedy film and the directorial debut of Rosie Lourde. It stars Tim Ross and Cindy Busby and was produced by The Steve Jaggi Company.

== Plot ==
Caroline, a chef in a swanky New York restaurant, discovers her Aunt Doreen has left her ownership of a cafe in Lemon Myrtle Cove, Australia. Leaving behind her job and ex-fiancé Nathaniel, Caroline finds that the Seagull Cafe is bustling and well-loved, and that she faces an offer to sell it. Initially wanting to sell, Caroline persuades the head chef Simon to help her fix up the place, only to soon realize that she really doesn't want to leave. Not only has she grown fond of the cafe and its customers, she has begun to fall in love with Simon. Eventually she must make a choice, particularly when Nathaniel starts pleading for them to get back together.

== Cast ==
- Cindy Busby as Caroline Wilson
- Tim Ross as Simon Cook
- Naomi Sequeira as Beth
- Peter Bensley as Dale Whitely
- Marita Wilcox as Marla
- Barbara Bingham as Denise Wilson
- Perry Mooney as Molly
- Joey Vieira as Nathaniel
- Gavin Zimmermann as Alex the Waiter

== Production ==
Filming for Romance on the Menu took place in the Brisbane, Australia suburb of Shorncliffe over a period of three weeks during late 2019. The film's plot was initially intended to be set entirely in the United States, but was later shifted to Australia.

== Release ==
Romance On The Menu was released to Netflix Australia on 24 September 2020.

== Reception ==
Viva's Megan Wood praised the film, calling it "charming, relatable and beautifully shot, showcasing Australia’s famous coastline with laid-back ease."
