= 18 Wheels of Justice =

2000 American television series

- Based on: 18 Wheels of Justice by Ray Brown
- Developed by: Richard C. Okie
- Starring: Lucky Vanous; G. Gordon Liddy; Billy Dee Williams; Lisa Thornhill
- Composer: Christopher Franke
- Country of origin: United States
- Original language: English
- No. of seasons: 2
- No. of episodes: 44

Production
- Executive producers: David H. Balkan; Stu Segall; Robb F. Dalton
- Running time: 60 minutes
- Production companies: In Motion Productions; Park Avenue Productions; Fireworks Entertainment; Stu Segall Productions; Eyemark Entertainment (2000) (season 1) King World (2000–2001) (seasons 1–2)

Original release
- Network: TNN
- Release: January 12, 2000 – June 6, 2001

18 Wheels of Justice is an American action drama television series starring Lucky Vanous, G. Gordon Liddy, and Billy Dee Williams. It aired from January 12, 2000, to June 6, 2001, on TNN. The series was developed by Richard C. Okie, who had previously been an executive producer on the similar show Renegade. 18 Wheels of Justice was filmed at Stu Segall Productions in San Diego, and distributed by King World Productions.

== Premise ==
Crime boss Jacob Calder is about to be sent to prison as a result of testimony by federal agent Michael Cates. Calder has Cates's wife and daughter killed and tries to have Cates himself finished off as well. In order to foil Calder's hitmen, Cates's boss, Burton Hardesty, convinces him to adopt the created identity of Chance Bowman, the driver of a Kenworth T2000 semi-truck. Bowman takes to the road, supported remotely by Agent Celia Baxter and Hardesty. In his travels, Bowman encounters various people and often helps them with their problems (not unlike the protagonists of The Incredible Hulk and The Fugitive).

== Cast ==
- Lucky Vanous as Michael Cates / Chance Bowman
- G. Gordon Liddy as Jacob Calder
- Billy Dee Williams as Burton Hardesty
- Lisa Thornhill as Celia "Cie" Baxter

== Episodes ==
Season	Episodes	Originally released	
Season	Episodes	First released	Last released
1	22	January 12, 2000	September 6, 2000
2	22	January 3, 2001	June 6, 2001

=== Season 1 (2000) ===
No. overall	No. in season	Title	Directed by	Written by	Original release date
1	1	"Genesis"	Unknown	Unknown	January 12, 2000
2	2	"Key to the Highway"	Unknown	Unknown	January 19, 2000
3	3	"Mr. Invisible"	Unknown	Unknown	January 26, 2000
4	4	"Showdown"	Unknown	Unknown	February 2, 2000
5	5	"Triple Play"	Camilo Vila	Doug Heyes, Jr.	February 9, 2000
6	6	"Prize Possession"	Unknown	Unknown	February 16, 2000
7	7	"Ordeal"	Unknown	Unknown	February 23, 2000
8	8	"Through a Glass Darkly"	Unknown	Unknown	March 1, 2000
9	9	"The Fire Next Time"	Unknown	Unknown	March 8, 2000
10	10	"Games of Chance"	Unknown	Unknown	March 15, 2000
11	11	"Two Eyes for an Eye"	Unknown	Unknown	March 22, 2000
12	12	"Smuggler's Blues"	Unknown	Unknown	June 21, 2000
13	13	"Ranger's Chance"	Carl Weathers	Ray Tex Brown & Bill Dial	July 5, 2000
14	14	"Wages of Sin"	Unknown	Unknown	July 12, 2000
15	15	"Road to Hell"	Unknown	Unknown	July 19, 2000
16	16	"There's Something About Marvin"	Unknown	Unknown	July 26, 2000
17	17	"Outside Chance"	Unknown	Unknown	August 2, 2000
18	18	"Sleeping Dragons"	Unknown	Unknown	August 9, 2000
19	19	"Con Truck"	Unknown	Unknown	August 16, 2000
20	20	"Legacy of Blood: Part 1"	Unknown	Unknown	August 23, 2000
21	21	"Caged: Part 2"	Unknown	Unknown	August 30, 2000
22	22	"Revelation: Part 3"	Unknown	Unknown	September 6, 2000

=== Season 2 (2001) ===
No. overall	No. in season	Title	Directed by	Written by	Original release date
23	1	"Shattered Images"	Unknown	Unknown	January 3, 2001
24	2	"Dance with the Devil"	Stewart Raffill	Richard Maxwell	January 10, 2001
25	3	"Amore...Omerta"	Unknown	Unknown	January 17, 2001
26	4	"Old Wives' Tale"	Unknown	Unknown	January 23, 2001
27	5	"Honor Thy Father"	Unknown	Unknown	January 30, 2001
28	6	"Criminal Trespass"	Unknown	Unknown	February 6, 2001
29	7	"Just South of El Paso"	Unknown	Unknown	February 13, 2001
30	8	"Hot Cars, Fast Women"	Unknown	Unknown	February 20, 2001
31	9	"Countdown"	Unknown	Unknown	February 27, 2001
32	10	"Past Imperfect"	William Gereghty	Harold Apter	March 5, 2001
33	11	"Wrong Place, Wrong Time"	Unknown	Unknown	March 13, 2001
34	12	"A Place Called Defiance"	Stewart Raffill	Darrell Fetty	March 20, 2001
35	13	"Come Back, Little Diva"	Unknown	Unknown	March 27, 2001
36	14	"Slight of Mind"	Unknown	Unknown	April 3, 2001
37	15	"Dream Girls"	Unknown	Unknown	April 10, 2001
38	16	"The Cage"	Unknown	Unknown	April 17, 2001
39	17	"Crossing the Line"	Unknown	Unknown	April 24, 2001
40	18	"A Family Upside Down"	Unknown	Unknown	May 1, 2001
41	19	"Once a Thief"	Rob Dunson	Story by : David Balkan & Richard Maxwell; Teleplay by : Richard Maxwell	May 8, 2001
42	20	"The Game"	Unknown	Unknown	May 15, 2001
43	21	"Second Sense"	Unknown	Unknown	May 30, 2001
44	22	"The Interrogation"	Unknown	Unknown	June 6, 2001
