= Stanley (1984 film) =

- Directed by: Esben Storm
- Produced by: Andrew Gaty
- Starring: Peter Bensley; Graham Kennedy; Max Cullen; Harold Hopkins; Bob Hornery
- Music by: William Motzing
- Release date: 1984
- Country: Australia
- Language: English
- Budget: A$4 million

Stanley is a 1984 Australian comedy film directed by Esben Storm and starring Peter Bensley and Graham Kennedy.

== Plot ==
Eccentric Stanley's father sends him to a Sanatorium to try and make him 'normal'. Desperate to fit in, Stanley finds the most normal family he can to model himself on.

== Cast ==
- Peter Bensley as Stanley Dunstan
- Nell Campbell as Amy Benton
- Graham Kennedy as Norm Norris
- Michael Craig as Sir Stanley Dunstan
- Max Cullen as Detective Berger
- David Argue as Morris Norris
- Susan Walker as Doris Norris
- Lorna Lesley as Sheryl Benton
- Betty Lucas as Lady Dunstan
- Joy Smithers as Patty Norris
- Harold Hopkins as Harry
- Esben Storm as Menswear Attendant

== Production ==
Andrew Gaty had developed the original script. He had a man working for him called Steve Kibbler, who had worked with Esben Storm. Gaty asked Storm what he thought of the script and Storm did not like it. Gaty then hired him to rewrite and direct the movie, with Stanley Mann acting as script editor. Storm said:

Andrew had certain things that he wanted, which I had to accommodate, but within that I was trying to make a comedy about acceptance and prejudice. But even though it was hugely unsuccessful, it was my first attempt at comedy, which I really enjoyed. Some people still come up and say they like it and have it in their collections and talk about it being hugely underrated.

Storm said the lead character "is just an honest, vulnerable, slightly wacky but mainly innocent guy interested in love. It was an attempt to make a film in the genre of Arthur or Cousine Cousine."

Gaty admitted "everyone says" the film sounded like Arthur but he felt "the only similarity is that it’s a fairytale about rich people. I think it has more to say than Arthur."

Andrew Gaty originally offered the title role to Mel Gibson who turned it down. He then tried to propose Tom Conti play the lead but Actors Equity objected. Gaty claims he tested more than 30 actors but could not find one he was happy with. He then attempted to import Anthony Andrews or Tom Conti but Actors Equity objected although filming was to star in a week. Equity did allow Jeremy Irons to appear in The Wild Duck (the cases were decided at the same hearing). Peter Bensley, then best known for The Young Doctors, was cast instead.

Filming took place in early 1983.

== Release ==
The film was unsuccessful at the box office. Ebsen Storm later said:

I think the script was okay. It's very hard to do comedy, and it's either funny or it isn't. I learnt a lot about comedy on that one. I think we would've been better off if the budget hadn't been so high, if we hadn't been trying to be so glossy. Andrew was very intent on making a sort of glossy big-style movie, and in the beginning the whole thing was all predicated on getting an American or an international star to play the lead. We had Tom Conti but they wouldn't let us bring him in. That could've made the difference.

FilmInk later said "To understand how the lawyers and stockbrokers raised $4 million for this comedy, it helps to remember how big a hit Arthur was in 1981, so presumably investors were hopeful of a success with this similar tale of an amiable but dimwitted rich kid."
