= Royal Hearts =

- Genre: Romance
- Teleplay by: Robin Bernheim; Kerry Lenhart
- Story by: John J. Sakmar
- Directed by: James Brolin
- Starring: James Brolin; Cindy Busby; Andrew Cooper
- Music by: John R. Graham
- Original language: English

Production
- Executive producers: James Brolin; Scott Hart; Eric Jarboe; Amanda Phillips Atkins; Jimmy Townsend
- Producer: Amy Krell
- Running time: 90 minutes
- Production company: Brad Krevoy Television

Original release
- Network: Hallmark Channel
- Release: February 24, 2018

Royal Hearts is a 2018 American made-for-television romance film starring James Brolin (who also directed the film), Cindy Busby and Andrew Cooper. It originally aired February 24, 2018, on the Hallmark Channel.

== Plot ==
Hank Pavlik (James Brolin) is the head of a ranch in Montana while his daughter Kelly (Cindy Busby) is an assistant professor at Montana State University who is a hopeless romantic. One day, a solicitor named Mr. Grimsby (Howard Crossley) arrives to deliver Hank the news that involves them having to go to Merania. When they arrive, they learn that Hank is the heir to the crown of Merania after a relative of theirs named King Viktor had died. As Kelly persuades her father to take the title, she meets the royal stable boy named Alex (Andrew Cooper). Hank helps to improve Merania when the neighboring kingdom of Angosia led by King Nikolas (Lachlan Nieboer) plans to claim ownership of Merania if Hank is not into remaining its king as it was mentioned that Merania and Angosia used to be one country centuries ago.

== Cast ==
- James Brolin as Hank Pavlik, a rancher and heir to the crown of Merania.
- Cindy Busby as Kelly Pavlik, an assistant professor and daughter of Hank.
- Andrew Cooper as Alex, a royal stable boy who becomes Kelly's love interest.
- Howard Crossley as Mr. Grimsby, a man who serves as the solicitor to Merania.
- Martin Wimbush as Bosworth, a man who serves as the gentleman's gentleman for Hank.
- Lachlan Nieboer as King Nikolas, the ruler of Angosia.
- Jeremy Colton as Ivan
- Glynis Barber as Joan
- Olivia Nita as Cecelia Petrov, a woman who works as a private secretary for Hank.
- Christine Allado as Jasmine
- Claudiu Trandafir as Karoly
- Nicholas Aaron as Zeke
- Jared Fortune as Craig
- Oltin Hurezeanu as Meranian Councillor
- Ion Galma as Royal Page

== Production ==
James Brolin was cast as the part of Hank Pavlik under the condition that he also got to direct the movie. Some of the scenes for this movie were filmed in Romania which was used to portray the fictional country of Merania.
