= A Life Interrupted =

- Genre: Drama
- Directed by: Stefan Pleszczynski
- Starring: Lea Thompson
- Country of origin: Canada
- Original language: English

Original release
- Network: Lifetime
- Release: April 23, 2007

A Life Interrupted is a 2007 Lifetime Television film directed by Stefan Pleszczynski and starring Lea Thompson. It was nominated in 2008 for the Best TV Movie Gemini Award. It depicts events in the life of sexual assault victim Debbie Smith, which led to the passage of the Debbie Smith Act. in 2004.

On March 3, 1989, a man wearing a ski mask entered Debbie Smith's home in Williamsburg, Virginia, and threatened her with a gun. He then dragged her into the woods and blindfolded her, before raping her repeatedly over the next hour. She participated in the collection of DNA evidence for a sexual assault evidence kit, but it was not formally tested and entered into the national criminal database until 1994. The film follows Debbie's fight for justice.

== Cast ==
- Lea Thompson as Debbie Smith
- Anthony Lemke as Rob Smith
- Cindy Busby as Crystal Smith
- Eleonore Lamothe as Young Crystal
- Tommy Lioutas as Bobby Smith
- Devon Bostick as Young Bobby
