= 12 Rounds 2: Reloaded =

- DVD cover
- Directed by: Roel Reiné
- Written by: David Benullo
- Produced by: Michael J. Luisi
- Starring: Randy Orton; Brian Markinson; Tom Stevens; Cindy Busby
- Cinematography: Anthony C. Metchie
- Edited by: Radu Ion
- Music by: Nathan Furst
- Production companies: WWE Studios (Reload Films, Inc.)
- Distributed by: 20th Century Fox Home Entertainment
- Release date: June 4, 2013
- Running time: 94 minutes
- Country: United States
- Language: English

12 Rounds 2: Reloaded (also known as 12 Rounds 2 and 12 Rounds: Reloaded) is a 2013 American action film directed by Roel Reiné. The film stars Randy Orton, Tom Stevens, Brian Markinson and Cindy Busby. It is a sequel to 2009's 12 Rounds starring John Cena. Unlike the original which saw a theatrical release, the film was released on direct-to-DVD and Blu-ray in the United States by 20th Century Fox Home Entertainment on June 4, 2013.

== Plot ==
Paramedic Nick Malloy finds himself playing a game called 12 Rounds with his wife Sarah's life on the line. As the game unfolds, Detectives McKenzie and Sykes are investigating an ambulance explosion, and while Sykes immediately blames Nick, McKenzie has her doubts. Meanwhile, Nick begins to put all the pieces of the puzzle together and finds out he was at the right place at the right time a year ago.

== Cast ==
- Randy Orton as Nick Malloy
- Tom Stevens as Tommy Weaver
- Brian Markinson as Patrick Heller
- Venus Terzo as Detective McKenzie
- Cindy Busby as Sarah Malloy
- Sean Rogerson as Detective Sykes
- Colin Lawrence as Jay Thompson
- Chelsey Reist as Amber
- Sebastian Spence as Governor Devlin Weaver
- Janene Carleton as Diana Heller
- Rachel Hayward as Roberta Shaw

== Production ==
Former WWE wrestler CM Punk said that he was initially chosen to star in the film, but was pulled from the project due to Punk's obligations for the WWE European tour taking place during filming in addition to being their WWE Champion at the time. John Cena was also considered to reprise his role from the previous installment 12 Rounds and Chris Jericho was also considered.

== Release ==
The DVD and Blu-ray were released in Region 1 in the United States on June 4, 2013, and Region 2 in the United Kingdom on 24 June. It was distributed by 20th Century Fox Home Entertainment. It made $919,421 worth of DVD units and $584,831 in Blu-ray units since June.

== Reception ==
Tyler Foster of DVD Talk rated it 1.5/5 stars and wrote: "Even the world's most committed Randy Orton fan won't get anything out of 12 Rounds 2, a dull rehash of a million other, better action movies that saddles Orton with an uninteresting character". David Johnson of DVD Verdict compared it negatively to the first film and wrote: "With 12 Rounds 2 and its dearth of compelling derring-do, we're left with Randy Orton grunting and running an obstacle course. No thanks".

== Sequel ==
A third film in the franchise called 12 Rounds 3: Lockdown was released in September 2015 starring Dean Ambrose.
