= 4th National Television Awards =

British awards ceremony in 1998

- Date: 27 October 1998
- Location: Royal Albert Hall, London
- Country: United Kingdom
- Presented by: Various
- Hosted by: Trevor McDonald
- Website: http://www.nationaltvawards.com/

Television/radio coverage
- Network: ITV

The 4th National Television Awards ceremony was held at the Royal Albert Hall on 27 October 1998 and was hosted by Trevor McDonald.

== Awards ==
Category	Winner	Also nominated
Most Popular Actor	John Thaw (Kavanagh QC)	Stephen Tompkinson (Ballykissangel); Alan Davies (Jonathan Creek); Robson Green (Touching Evil); Ross Kemp (EastEnders)
Most Popular Actress	Amanda Burton (Silent Witness)	Dervla Kirwan (Ballykissangel); Pauline Quirke (Birds of a Feather); Pam Ferris (Where the Heart Is); Sarah Lancashire (Where the Heart Is)
Most Popular Drama Series	Jonathan Creek (BBC One)	Ballykissangel (BBC One); Where the Heart Is (ITV); Kavanagh QC (ITV)
Most Popular Serial Drama	Coronation Street (ITV)	Brookside (Channel 4); EastEnders (BBC One); Emmerdale (ITV)
Most Popular Entertainment Programme	Stars in Their Eyes (ITV)	It'll Be Alright on the Night (ITV); Jim Davidson's Generation Game (BBC One); Shooting Stars (BBC Two)
Most Popular Talk Show	Parkinson (BBC One)	Des O'Connor Tonight (ITV); TFI Friday (Channel 4); The Mrs Merton Show (BBC Two)
Most Popular Entertainment Presenter	Michael Barrymore	Bruce Forsyth; Jim Davidson; Lily Savage
Most Popular Daytime Programme	This Morning (ITV)	The Big Breakfast (Channel 4); Countdown (Channel 4); GMTV (ITV)
Most Popular Factual Entertainment Programme	Changing Rooms (BBC Two)	Animal Hospital (BBC One); Celebrity Ready, Steady, Cook (BBC Two); Strange but True? (ITV)
Most Popular Documentary	Full Circle with Michael Palin (BBC One)	Children's Hospital (BBC One); The Human Body (BBC One)
Most Popular Quiz Programme	Have I Got News for You (BBC Two)	A Question of Sport (BBC One); Michael Barrymore's Strike It Rich (ITV); They Think It's All Over (BBC One)
Most Popular Comedy Programme	The Vicar of Dibley (BBC One)	Friends (Channel 4/NBC); Last of the Summer Wine (BBC One); Men Behaving Badly (BBC One)
Most Popular Comedy Performer	Nicholas Lyndhurst (Goodnight Sweetheart)	Dawn French (The Vicar of Dibley); Caroline Quentin (Kiss Me Kate); Judi Dench (As Time Goes By); Martin Clunes (Men Behaving Badly)
Most Popular Newcomer	Anna Brecon (Emmerdale)	Claire Goose (Casualty); Jane Danson (Coronation Street); Adam Rickitt (Coronation Street); Jason Durr (Heartbeat)
Most Popular Advert	Diet Coke ("11.30 Appointment")	Andrex ("Puppy Patrol"); Tesco ("Dotty and Jane"); W H Smith (Nicholas Lyndhurst)
Special Recognition Award	John Thaw	
