= Anders Lindbäck (vicar) =

Swedish vicar and serial killer

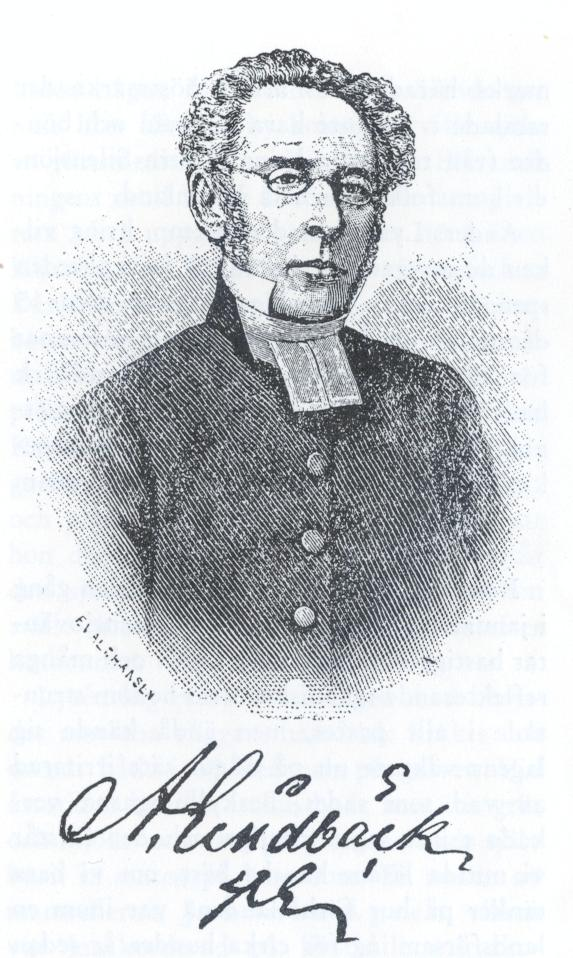
- A sketched portrait with Lindbäck's signature.
- Born: 22 December 1803; Brålanda, Sweden
- Died: 20 November 1865 (aged 61); Karlstad, Sweden
- Cause of death: Suicide by hanging
- Conviction: Murder (3 counts)
- Penalty: Death

Details
- Victims: 7 confirmed: 3 Dead; 4 Survived
- Span of crimes: 1864–1864
- Date apprehended: 1865

Anders Lindbäck (22 December 1803 – 20 November 1865) was a vicar who committed three murders and is thus the first documented Swedish serial killer. He was caught and convicted in 1865.

== Childhood and education ==
Lindbäck was born in Bredtvet near Brålanda to the farmer Sven Andersson (1774-1822) and his mother Lisa Olsdotter (d. 1821). The family was extremely poor, and Sven was at times forced to steal to feed his family, his father received the derogatory moniker of "Ham-Sven", for supposedly being caught stealing a ham at one point. While growing up, Anders received many taunts and jeers from the people around him due to the crimes of his father.

The family made ends meet mostly through gifts of food from around the parish community, until his maternal uncle, vicar Johan Nordahl from the parish in Nössemark (now part of Dals-Eds parish) sponsored Lindbäck with enough money to attend school in Vänersborg. Later on, in 1824, he attended one of Sweden's oldest Upper Secondary Schools, the Cathedral School in Skara.

Lindbäck was enrolled at Uppsala University on 2 February 1829 and was later ordained there on 19 December 1831, immediately after his graduation he was hired by the Church of Sweden as a curate for the parish at Skållerud and simultaneously acted as headmaster at the local school which was funded by the nearby ironworks. He stayed there until 1861 when he applied for and was given the role of vicar for the parish in Silbodal. During his stay in Skållerud, Lindbäck had been a fierce opponent of alcoholism and preached for temperance and complete abstinence from alcohol, a battle he continued when he moved to Silbodal.

== Marriage and children ==
While living in Skållerud, Lindbäck received board and lodging from a local farmer and inspector Johan Ågren, whose unmarried niece Johanna Ågren quickly became enamoured with Lindbäck. Even so, he decided to marry another woman by the name of Fredrika Charlotta Bergman in 1834, however, after the death of her uncle, Johanna Ågren offered to sell her uncle's farm for a far smaller sum than expected on the condition that she could live on the farm for the remainder of her days.

It was a wealthy farmstead and the profits made from it gave Lindbäck the opportunity to give both his sons a proper education, both becoming officers in the Swedish Army.

== Time in Silbodal ==
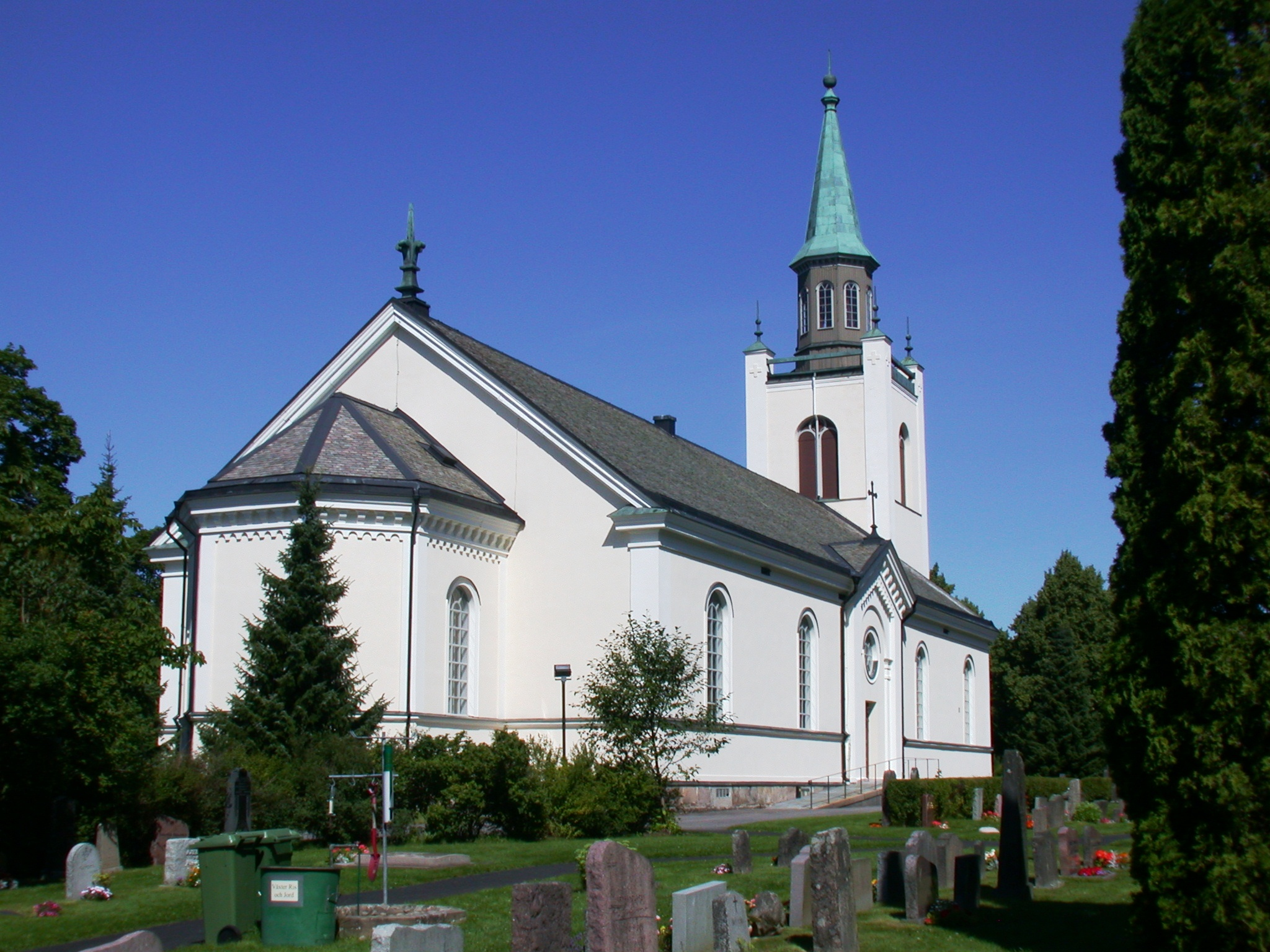
Silbodal church.

After accepting the position as vicar in the parish of Silbodal, Lindbäck was given the unenviable task of caring for a group of 40 people who were supposed to receive poverty aid from the church. A very heavy burden to bear for such a small parish connected to a woodland township.

Lindbäck sought to relieve the pressure these expenses were putting on his parish and thus began to push through a number of regulations and ordinances in an effort to lower these costs.

He wanted to minimize as much of the costs that the church was bearing as possible. Establishing an advisory board of nine people, and together with them he set strict rules; one of their decisions was that only their own parishioners could receive help from the church. In general, these new regulations which stated who could receive aid and who was to be denied became more stringent as time went on and some of them might even have been illegal.

This turned into a near-obsessive compulsion to the point that he committed at least 3 documented murders by mixing arsenic with the communion wine. There were also suspicions that he had poisoned others and simply failed to kill his victims in quite a few of these poisonings, instead leading to bouts of extreme sickness but not resulting in the death of the victim.

=== Murders ===
As Lindbäck tried to find ways to cut costs for the parish, he saw the poor and sick as too much of a drain on the church coffers. Thus, he came up with an economically beneficial solution that would also decrease the number of supplicants; by poisoning them as they received their Holy Communion.

In the latter half of 1864, he made several home visits to people to deliver food and his blessings as the local vicar to those who were sick. However, after some of his visits, the people he visited would end up getting worse than they were before. Then, on 19 October that year, a widow by the name of Karin Persdotter was the first to be killed by the spiked wine and wafers. A little over a month later on 30 November 1864, a farmer named Nils Pettersson was the second person to die after a visit by Lindbäck, followed by Anders Lysén on 15 December 1864. Furthermore, four others are known to have been poisoned severely enough that they suffered serious symptoms.

== Capture ==
Lindbäck's last victim Anders Lysén had indeed been of poor health when he was visited by the vicar, however, he wasn't poor, nor was he without friends or family. His sudden death led to his relatives suspecting foul play.

In February of 1865, Lysén's relatives demanded that his grave be opened and an autopsy conducted on his corpse, this was promptly done and a month later, in March, it was concluded that Lysén had indeed died from being poisoned with arsenic.

Suspicion quickly landed on Lindbäck, as he had been one of the last people to be in close proximity to Lysén before his death, and it was also discovered that several burials at the local church had been conducted unusually fast.

== Trial and death ==
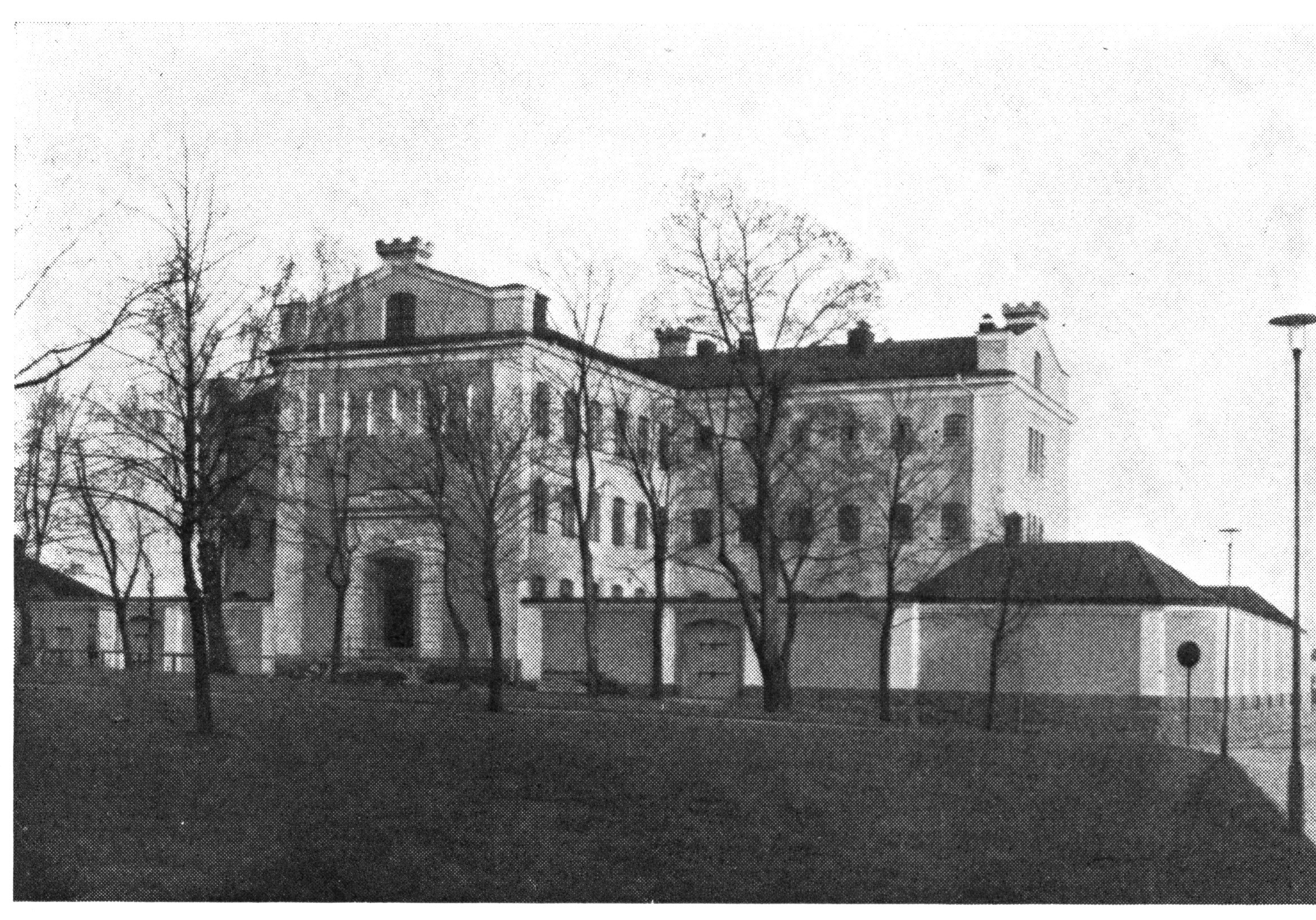
Karlstad prison in the 1930's.

Lindbäck was arrested and brought to stand trial at the Nordmark district court where he confessed to his crimes but attempted to defend his actions by saying they were intended as an act of mercy.

However, the court found that at least one of the murders had been committed with some degree of financial motivation and thus rejected his explanation outright and condemned him to death by beheading.

The case was later brought before the Court of Appeal which scolded the district court for a substandard investigation and legal process. Thus, the case was sent back to the district court which upheld their previous verdict. While Lindbäck was awaiting execution in Karlstad prison, he committed suicide by hanging.

=== Known victims ===
==== Murders ====
- 19 October 1864: Karin Persdotter
- 30 November 1864: Nils Pettersson
- 15 December 1864: Anders Lysén

==== Attempted Murders ====
- Daniel Andersson
- Daniel Danielsson
- Nils Danielson
- Per Olsson

== See also ==
- List of serial killers by country
