= The Unfolding =

2016 British horror film

- Directed by: Eugene McGing
- Screenplay by: Eugene McGing
- Produced by: Paul Bayada; Kevin Phelan
- Starring: Robert Daws; Kitty McGeever; Lachlan Nieboer; Lisa Kerr; Nick Julian; Sam Swainsbury
- Cinematography: Cinders Forshaw
- Edited by: Jazz Goddard
- Music by: Leslie Rothwell
- Production company: Robin Films
- Distributed by: Icon Film Distribution
- Release dates: 28 February 2016 (Fantasporto Oporto); 14 March 2016
- Running time: 90 minutes
- Country: United Kingdom
- Language: English

The Unfolding is a 2016 British horror film directed by Eugene McGing and starring Lachlan Nieboer, Lisa Kerr, Robert Daws, Nick Julian and Kitty McGeever. Much of it is filmed in the style of found footage movies. The Unfolding had its TV premiere on 21 August 2016 on the Horror Channel.

== Plot ==
In autumn, 2016, the world stands at the brink of nuclear war. In the context of this, a young researcher and his girlfriend go to an old house in rural England. In the house they find themselves at the mercy of an evil presence.

== Cast ==
- Lachlan Nieboer as Tam Burke
- Lisa Kerr as Rose Ellis
- Robert Daws as Professor Chessman
- Nick Julian as Harvey Waller
- Kitty McGeever as Muriel Roy
