= Lachlan Nieboer =

British actor

- Education: Pontifical Gregorian University (Rome); Oxford University; Lee Strasberg Theatre and Film Institute (New York); King's College London
- Occupations: Actor, director, producer
- Years active: 2007–2020

Lachlan Nieboer is a retired British actor best known for his roles as Lieutenant Edward Courtenay in Downton Abbey, Count Antonio Rossi in The Princess Switch: Switched Again and Cpt. Charles Davenport in the film Into the White; and as executive producer for Shane, a documentary on Australian cricketer, Shane Warne.

== Career ==
Nieboer played Captain Jack Harkness's brother, Gray, in the second series of the BBC television series Torchwood. He played Lieutenant Edward Courtenay in the second series of Downton Abbey. He starred alongside Harry Potter actor Rupert Grint as Captain Davenport in the Norwegian feature film Cross of Honour (originally Into the White), based on a true story. He played Dominic in Mike Figgis's suspense thriller Suspension of Disbelief and Ted in Fredrik Bond's Charlie Countryman opposite Shia LaBeouf and Aubrey Plaza.

Nieboer also starred in The Unfolding, Identicals and Trendy, a thriller shot in East London, which premiered in competition at the Raindance Film Festival. Nieboer has lead roles opposite Jim Brolin in Royal Hearts, and Vanessa Hudgens in The Princess Switch: Switched Again.

Nieboer ran his own theatre company for three years, and has also worked at the National Theatre and in various fringe theatres in London.

He has retired from acting.

== Filmography ==
=== Film ===
Year	Title	Role	Notes
2007	Heartland	Ryan McGonagle	Short film
2009	Vivaldi, the Red Priest	Lord Brandon Perry	
2012	Into the White	Captain Charles P. Davenport	
2012	Suspension of Disbelief	Dominic	
2013	The House and Everything	James	Short film
2013	Charlie Countryman	Ted	
2015	The Unfolding	Tam	Official Selection - London FrightFest Film Festival 2015
2015	Identicals (Brand New-U)	Slater	Official Selection - L'Étrange Festival 2015 Nominated - Edinburgh International Film Festival Best Performance in a British Feature Film
2016	Checkmate	Dimitri	Short film
2017	Trendy	Richard Allen	Official Selection - Raindance Film Festival 2017
2017	Royal Hearts	King Nikolas	
2017	Baghdad in my Shadow	Martin	
2018	Little Kingdom	Jack Kovac	
2019	The Princess Switch: Switched Again	Count Antonio Rossi	
2020	Her Pen Pal	Cameron Reisch	
2020	Love in Verona	Bud Logan	

=== Television ===
Year	Title	Role	Notes
2008	Torchwood	Gray	2 episodes: "Fragments", "Exit Wounds"
2011	Downton Abbey	Lieutenant Edward Courtenay	1 episode: "Episode #2.2"
2013	Jo	Alain Allanic	1 episode: "Place Vendôme"
