= Brålanda =

- Town
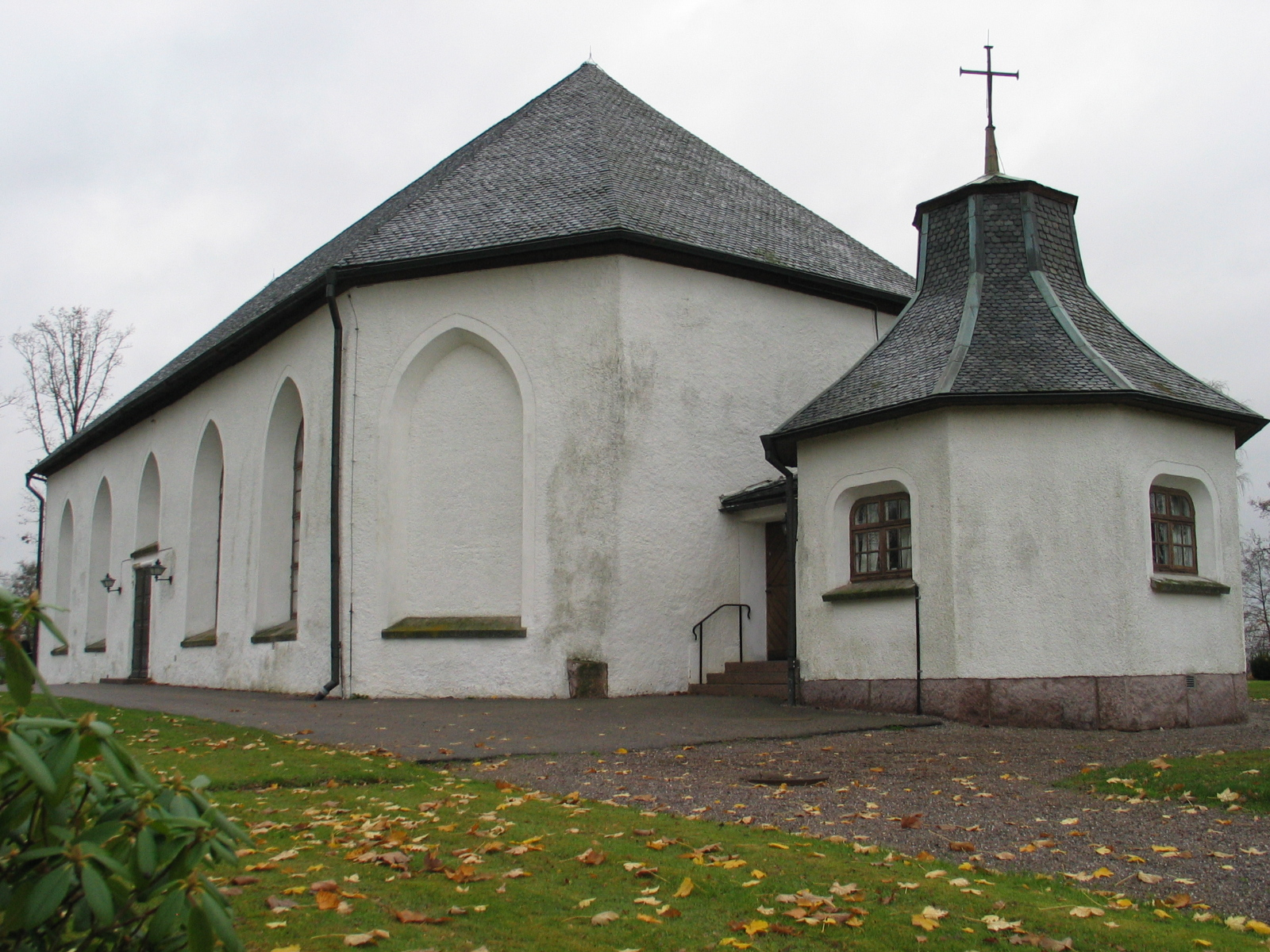
- Brålanda church

- Location within Västra Götaland Location within Sweden
- Coordinates: 58°34′N 12°22′E
- Country: Sweden
- Province: Dalsland
- County: Västra Götaland County
- Municipality: Vänersborg Municipality
- Estimated founding: Early middle ages
- First proof of settlement: 1382
- Current location: 1870
- Named for: The location of a bridge over the Frändeforsån (English: Frändefors River)
- Seat: Vänersborgs Kommunhus

Government
  - Type: City Council
  - Body: Vänersborg Municipality Council

Area
  - Water: 2.7 km^{2} (1.0 sq mi)
  - Urban: 1.52 km^{2} (0.59 sq mi)
  - Rural: 220.4 km^{2} (85.1 sq mi)
- Elevation: 70 m (230 ft)

Population (1 January 2016)
  - Urban: 1,385
  - Urban density: 908/km^{2} (2,350/sq mi)
  - Rural: 2,267
  - Rural density: 10/km^{2} (26/sq mi)
- Demonym: Brålandabo
- Time zone: UTC+1 (CET)
  - Summer (DST): UTC+2 (CEST)

Brålanda is a locality situated in Vänersborg Municipality, Västra Götaland County, Sweden with 1,385 inhabitants in 2010.

It is situated 24 km north of the town Vänersborg, by the southern parts of lake Vänern. It is a conjoining town for the rural agricultural lands, and has a large storage silo for crops.

In the town there is one grocery shop, one Burger King restaurant, a swimming bath, a campground, and a small library.

One of the first known serial killers in Sweden was born in Brålanda. His name was Anders Lindbäck, a vicar who added Arsenic to the wine before serving it.
