= Lucky Vanous =

American model and actor (born 1961)

Lucky Joseph Vanous

Personal details
- Born: April 11, 1961 (age 64); Lincoln, Nebraska
- Height: 1.93 m (6 ft 4 in)

Lucky Joseph Vanous (born April 11, 1961) is an American model and actor. He became nationally known in 1994 after appearing in a series of commercials for Diet Coke.

== Life and career ==
Vanous was born in Lincoln, Nebraska, and served in the United States Army 1st Ranger Battalion. Upon discharge, he studied at University of Nebraska–Lincoln. He was discovered while visiting Manhattan, and he moved there to model and continue his studies at the New York University and Fordham University. He married Kristen Noel in 1989, and they were divorced in 1996.

Notable acting roles include playing Matt Dunning for a season on Pacific Palisades and playing Chance Bowman on 18 Wheels of Justice.

== Filmography ==
Year	Title	Role	Notes
1994	Wings	Young Man	
1995	All My Children	Mr. Marvelous	
1997	Pacific Palisades	Matt Dunning	
1997	Chapter Perfect	Michael Glover	
1999	Pensacola: Wings of Gold	Ripper	
1999	Will & Grace	EMS Paramedic	
2000	Hanging Up	Montana Dude	
2000	Jack of Hearts	Lee Dillon	
2000-2001	18 Wheels of Justice	Chance Bowman	
2002	The Weakest Link	Himself	
2003	Two and a Half Men	Kevin	
