= Lee Garfinkel =

American businessperson (born 1955)

- Born: February 3, 1955 (age 71); The Bronx, New York, U.S
- Education: Bronx High School of Science
- Occupation: Businessperson

Lee Garfinkel (born February 3, 1955) is an American businessperson in the field of advertising. He was most recently the CEO of FCB Garfinkel, the New York office of FCB (Foote, Cone and Belding).

== Early life (1955–1978) ==
Garfinkel was born in the Bronx, New York. His father was a shoe salesman and his mother was a bookkeeper. He attended the Bronx High School of Science but graduated from Evander Childs High School. He then went on to Queens College, graduating in 1977. While in college, he played in several rock bands and folk groups. He also tried his hand at stand up comedy performing at the Improv in New York and the Comedy Store in Los Angeles.

== Career ==
Garfinkel launched his career in 1978 as a junior copywriter at a small advertising agency called James Neal Harvey. After only two months, he left to take a job at the creative agency, Levine Huntley Schmidt Plapler and Beaver, where he stayed for eleven years. Rising from junior copywriter to executive creative director in just a few years, Lee wrote or supervised successful campaigns for Subaru, Citizen Watches, Matchbox cars, Ferrarelle Mineral Water and Genesee Beer.

In 1989, he was recruited by BBDO to head up the Pepsi account. During his time at BBDO, he wrote some of Pepsi's most famous commercials including the original Cindy Crawford commercial.

After three years of working primarily on Pepsi, London Ad man Frank Lowe enticed Lee to become the Creative Leader of IPG agency, Lowe New York. Lee worked at Lowe & Partners for eight years, eventually becoming Chairman, CEO and Chief Creative Officer, U.S. During his tenure he was credited with turning Lowe into one of the most creative agencies in America. He worked on such brands as Mercedes-Benz, Diet Coke (the famous Diet Coke Construction Worker commercial), Sprite (Obey Your Thirst), Heineken (It's All About the Beer), Citibank, Sun Microsystems, KPMG, Sony, CBS and GMC trucks.

In 2001, Lee moved to D'Arcy as President and World Wide Creative Director. He was soon followed by the Heineken account which had experienced significant success under his creative leadership. During his short time at D'Arcy, Lee also helped revitalize such brands as Crest and Cadillac. When Maurice Levy and Publicis purchased D'Arcy, Lee was offered the role of Global Creative Director of the Publicis advertising agency. Instead Lee chose to team up with his friend Ken Kaess, CEO of DDB.

Lee started at DDB NY in March 2003 as Chairman, Chief Creative Officer. During his tenure, he helped DDB gain new assignments on Bud Light and Michelob. He was also responsible for the biggest stretch of new business wins in DDB NY's recent history, winning such accounts as Diet Pepsi, Philips Global, Subaru, Lipton Tea, The American Cotton Council, United Technologies Corp., Electrolux Appliances, Hertz, Legg Mason, Georgia Pacific and Gibson Guitars. Lee was also the architect behind Amplify, the digital group within DDB New York.

In 2011, Lee joined EuroRSCG (now known as Havas Worldwide) as chief creative officer, Global Brands. He created new campaigns for Atlantic City Tourism (DO AC), New York Life (Keep Good Going) as well as supervising the successful "Most Interesting Man" campaign for Dos Equis.

On January 1, 2014, Lee returned to holding company, IPG and assumed the role of CEO at Draftfcb New York. On March 10, 2014, Draftfcb officially changed its name to FCB (Foote, Cone and Belding) and renamed the New York office FCB Garfinkel in recognition of Lee's creative standards.

Today, Lee is the Chairman of The Garfinkel Group LLC.

== Awards and recognition ==
Lee Garfinkel has received every major advertising award. In addition to winning Cannes Lions for Subaru, Pepsi, Mercedes, Beneficial and Heineken, his industry honors also include One Show, ANDY and Clio awards. Garfinkel has served as President of the One Club (1991–1993); he chaired the ANDY Awards in 1998 and in 2002 he was the U.S. Juror at the Cannes Lions International Advertising Festival.

=== Timeline ===
In 1986, Adweek chose Lee for the magazine’s East Coast All-Star Team of Best TV Copywriters.

Three years later, Adweek’s Winners Magazine selected him as the #1 Copywriter and #3 Creative Director in the United States.

In 1992, Lee was selected by Crain’s New York Business for its annual “Forty under 40” feature, which profiles executives under 40 making their mark in business.

In 1994, Lee was inducted into the Advertising Hall of Achievement.

The following year, Adweek once again chose him for their U.S. All-Star Team, this time as Best Creative Director.

In 1998, Lee was featured in the Wall Street Journal’s creative leader series.

And in 2005, Lee was part of the management team responsible for DDB being named Adweek’s “Global Agency of the Year.”

== See also ==
- D'Arcy Masius Benton & Bowles
- DDB Worldwide
