= Cindy Busby =

Canadian actress and singer (born 1983)

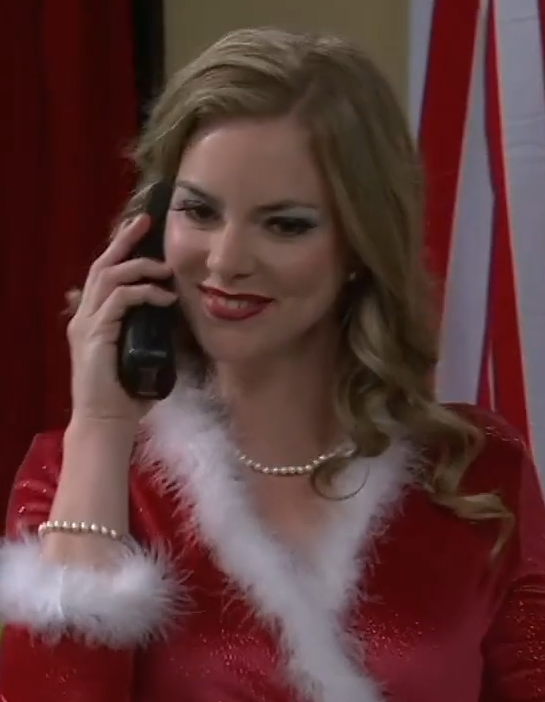
- Busby in Mr. Young
- Born: March 18, 1983 (age 43); Montreal, Quebec, Canada
- Occupations: Actress; singer
- Years active: 1999–present
- Spouse: Chris Boyd (m. 2020)
- Website: www.cindybusby.com

Cindy Busby (born March 18, 1983) is a Canadian actress and singer. She portrayed Ashley Stanton on Heartland, and has played many roles in Hallmark movies, including Marrying Mr. Darcy, Follow Me to Daisy Hills, and Warming Up to You.

== Early life and education ==
Born and raised in Montreal, Quebec, Busby always dreamed of becoming an actress. From the time she was a child, she loved performing for an audience and throughout her elementary school and high school years, she devoted herself to every theater school production. Upon graduating from high school, Busby was accepted into the Professional Theater Program at Dawson College in Montreal and was admitted from among hundreds of applicants.

== Career ==
Starting out in theater in 2005, she crossed into television and film and was given her first lead in the story of the Canadian medical hero Norman Bethune in the television series Bethune, which filmed in rural China for two and a half months and attracted several million viewers. In 2006, Busby played a supporting lead in the Lifetime original film A Life Interrupted opposite Lea Thompson and also landed a series regular role on the series Heartland when she was cast as Ashley Stanton, a rich, self-righteous, competitive horseback rider. The series has been nominated for several Gemini Awards as well as winning a Directors Guild of Canada prize and became one of the most popular shows on Canadian television.

In 2008 and 2009, Busby first landed the lead antagonist in the film Picture This alongside Ashley Tisdale, Shenae Grimes, and Kevin Pollak and appeared on the hit CW series The Vampire Diaries. In 2011, she appeared on the big screen in Fox 2000 Pictures' The Big Year, in which she was seen opposite Steve Martin, Jack Black, and Owen Wilson.

In 2012, Busby filmed guest starring roles on the CW shows Supernatural, The L.A. Complex, and The Secret Circle. She was also seen as a lead in the SyFy movie of the week, Mega Cyclone, and more recently, was seen in 12 Rounds 2: Reloaded as the wife of WWE wrestler Randy Orton, in The Wedding Chapel playing a young Shelley Long, and in Hallmark Channel's Lucky in Love opposite Jessica Szhor.

Busby has been seen guest starring on USA's Rush, TNT's Proof and recurred on Hallmark Channel's Debbie Macomber's Cedar Cove. She starred in the independent films The Circle and 40 Below and Falling and was cast as the lead in A Puppy for Christmas. She also appeared in the Hallmark Movies & Mysteries original, Hailey Dean Mystery: Murder, With Love.

== Personal life ==
In December 2020, Busby married producer Chris Boyd after four years of dating.

== Filmography ==
=== Film ===
Year	Title	Role	Notes
2005	La derniere incarnation	Femme line-up	
2006	Thrill of the Kill	Amber	TV movie
2007	A Life Interrupted	Crystal Smith	TV movie
2008	Picture This	Lisa Cross	TV movie
2009	Dead like Me: Life After Death	Jenny	Video
2009	Hostile Makeover	Montana	TV movie
2009	Free Fall	Flirt de P-A	
2009	American Pie Presents: The Book of Love	Amy	Video
2010	Let the Game Begin	Sarah	
2010	Diary of a Wimpy Kid	'80s Popular Girl	
2010	A Heartland Christmas	Ashley Stanton	TV movie
2011	Behemoth	Grace Walsh	TV movie
2011	Ghost Storm	Daisy	TV movie
2011	Mega Cyclone	Susan	TV movie
2011	The Big Year	Susie	
2013	The Wedding Chapel	Young Jeanie	
2013	12 Rounds 2: Reloaded	Sarah Malloy	
2014	Lucky in Love	Brooke	TV movie
2014	Bad City	Luscious	
2014	Greenwood	Beth	Short
2015	A Frosty Affair	Cindi	TV movie
2015	White Raven	Janet	
2016	Unleashing Mr. Darcy	Elizabeth Scott	TV movie
2016	Hailey Dean Mystery: Murder, With Love	Amanda	TV movie
2016	A Puppy for Christmas	Noelle	TV movie
2017	Betting on the Bride	Julie Banning	TV movie
2017	Runaway Christmas Bride	Kate Paulson	TV movie
2017	Hailey Dean Mystery: Deadly Estate	Amanda	TV movie
2018	Autumn Stables	Autumn Carlisle	TV movie
2018	Royal Hearts	Kelly Pavlik	TV movie
2018	The Wrong Daughter	Kate	TV movie
2018	Marrying Mr. Darcy	Elizabeth Scott	TV movie
2018	Christmas Cupcakes	Gina Remo	TV movie
2018	A Christmas in Royal Fashion	Kristin	TV movie
2019	The Killer Downstairs	Alison Peters	TV movie
2019	My Mom's Letter from Heaven	Libby Johnson	TV movie
2019	My Boyfriend's Back: Wedding March 5	Annalise	TV movie
2019	The Wrong Stepmother	Maddie	TV movie
2019	A Godwink Christmas: Meant For Love	Alice	TV movie
2020	Welcome to the Circle	Rebekah	
2020	Love in the Forecast	Leah Waddell	TV movie
2020	Romance in the Air	Eden Clark	TV movie
2020	Romance on the Menu	Caroline Wilson	
2020	Follow Me to Daisy Hills	Jo Mason	TV movie
2021	Chasing Waterfalls	Amy Atwater	TV movie
2021	My Husband's Killer Girlfriend	Leah	TV movie
2021	Honey Girls	Wanda	
2021	Love in Action	Kate Wolfe	TV movie
2021	The Holiday Train	Danielle Prescott	TV movie
2021	Joy for Christmas	Holly Silver	TV movie
2022	Marry Me in Yosemite	Zoe Best	TV movie
2022	Crown Prince of Christmas	Madison Little	TV movie
2023	Love in Zion National: A National Park Romance	Lauren	TV movie
2023	Everything Christmas	Lori-Jo 'LJ'	TV movie
2024	A Whitewater Romance	Maya Alvaro	TV movie

=== Television ===
Year	Title	Role	Notes
2002	Undressed	Christine	Recurring Cast: Season 6
2004	15/Love	-	Episode: "The French Deception"
2006	Bethune	Lisa	Episode: "Part I & II"
2007	Superstorm	Tania	Episode: "Part I"
2007	Durham County	Trisha	Episode: "The Lady of the Lake"
2007	Killer Wave	Grad Student	Episode: "Part I & II"
2007	St. Urbain's Horseman	Girl #1	Episode: "Part I & II"
2007–Present	Heartland	Ashley Stanton	Main Cast: Season 1-4, Recurring Cast: Season 7
2009	The Vampire Diaries	Brooke Fenton	Episode: "Pilot"
2011–13	Supernatural	Jenny Klein	Guest Cast: Season 7-8
2012	The Secret Circle	Sara Armstrong	Episode: "Witness"
2012	The L.A. Complex	Mandi	Episode: "Home"
2012	Mr. Young	Mrs. Clause	Episode: "Mr. Elf"
2013	Psych	Leecy	Episode: "Nip and Suck It!"
2014	The Tomorrow People	Sexy Med Tech	Episode: "Modus Vivendi" & "A Sort of Homecoming"
2014	Rush	Hannah	Episode: "Pilot"
2014–15	Cedar Cove	Rebecca Jennings	Recurring Cast: Season 2, Main Cast: Season 3
2015	Proof	Ava Walker	Episode: "Reborn"
2017	When Calls the Heart	Marlise Bennett	Recurring Cast: Season 4
2017	Somewhere Between	Marie-Claude DeKizer	Recurring Cast
2017	Date My Dad	Stephanie	Main Cast
2019	Bachelor Daddies	Rachel	Recurring Cast
2019	V.C. Andrews' Heaven	Jillian	Episode: "Web of Dreams"

=== Web ===
Year	Title	Role	Notes
2009	The Vampire Diaries: A Darker Truth	Brooke Fenton	Episode: "A Darker Truth Part 3"
