= Bruce Willis filmography =

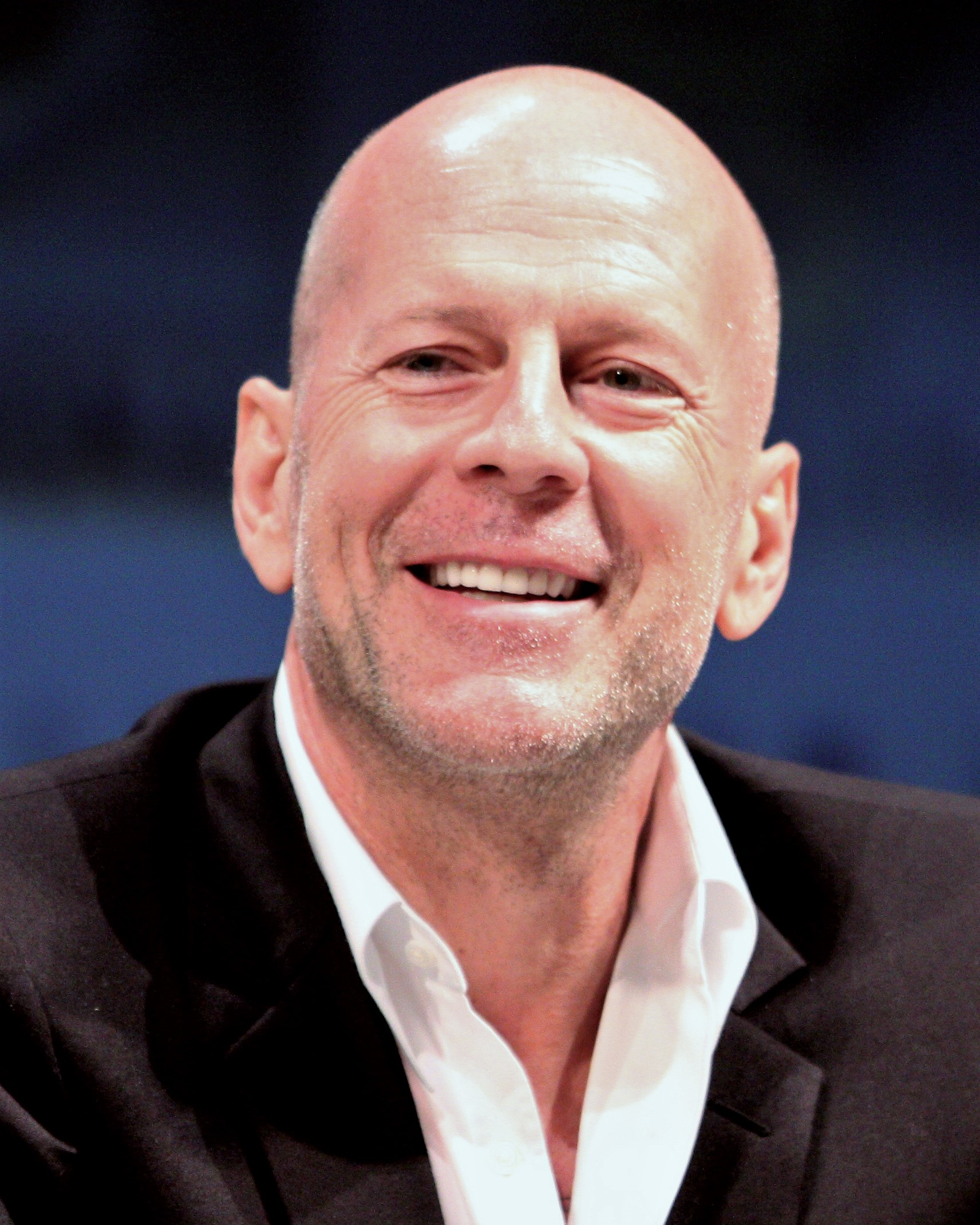
Willis at San Diego Comic-Con for The Expendables in 2010

American actor Bruce Willis began his career in 1980 with an uncredited role in The First Deadly Sin. After guest-starring in a 1984 episode of Miami Vice, he appeared in the first episode of the 1985 revival of The Twilight Zone. Willis achieved fame starring in the ABC comedy-drama series Moonlighting (1985–1989), for which he received three Golden Globe nominations for Best Actor – Television Series Musical or Comedy and two Primetime Emmy Award nominations for Outstanding Lead Actor in a Drama Series. In 1988, he starred as John McClane in Die Hard (1988), a film that spawned four sequels that earned him international recognition as an action hero.

In the following years, Willis lent his voice for the video game Apocalypse (1998), the comedy film Look Who's Talking (1989), and its sequel Look Who's Talking Too (1990). In 1991, he conceived the story for Hudson Hawk and appeared in The Last Boy Scout alongside Damon Wayans, which earned a cult following and a nomination for the MTV Movie Award for Best On-Screen Duo. Willis's additional credits include: Death Becomes Her (1992), Pulp Fiction (1994), 12 Monkeys (1995), The Fifth Element, The Jackal (both 1997), Armageddon and The Siege (both 1998). In 1999, he starred as Dr. Malcolm Crowe in the critically acclaimed The Sixth Sense, which became his highest-grossing film. His guest appearance on Friends in 2000 earned him his third Emmy nomination, this time for Outstanding Guest Actor in a Comedy Series. After appearing in Sin City (2005) and voicing the lead character RJ in the animated film Over the Hedge (2006), he starred in Red and made a cameo appearance in The Expendables (both 2010).

By the 2010s, Willis began starring in numerous direct-to-video films that received mostly negative reviews from critics and moviegoers. From The New York Times, Elisabeth Vincentelli analyzed several of his films and found that they generally lacked substance, with action sequences replacing "any attempts at coming up with decent plots", and featured Willis for an average of 15 minutes. Willis also starred in the 2012 films Moonrise Kingdom, The Expendables 2, and Looper. In 2013, he made an appearance as the title character in G.I. Joe: Retaliation and hosted Saturday Night Live. Willis was also known for collaborating with filmmaker M. Night Shyamalan on The Sixth Sense and the Eastrail 177 Trilogy, consisting of Unbreakable (2000), Split (2016), and Glass (2019). In March 2022, Willis's family announced his retirement after he was diagnosed with aphasia, a diagnosis revised almost a year later to frontotemporal dementia. The films that Willis starred in throughout his career grossed over US$5 billion collectively worldwide, making him one of the highest-grossing actors in the world.

== Film ==
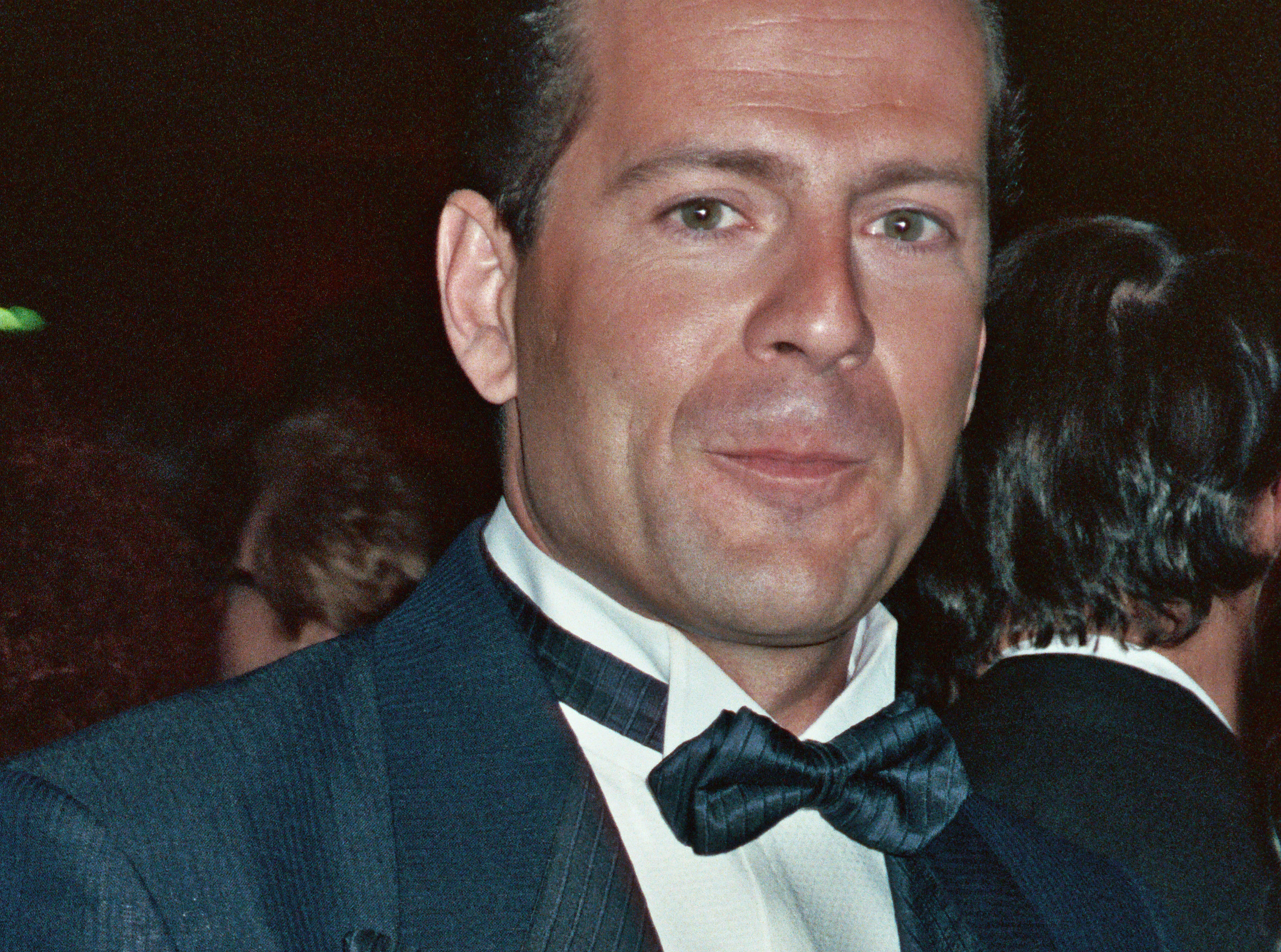
Willis at the 61^{st} Academy Awards (1989)

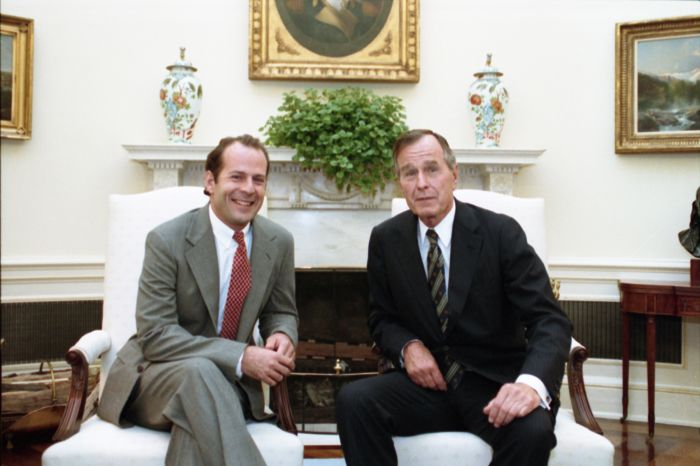
With President George H. W. Bush (1992)

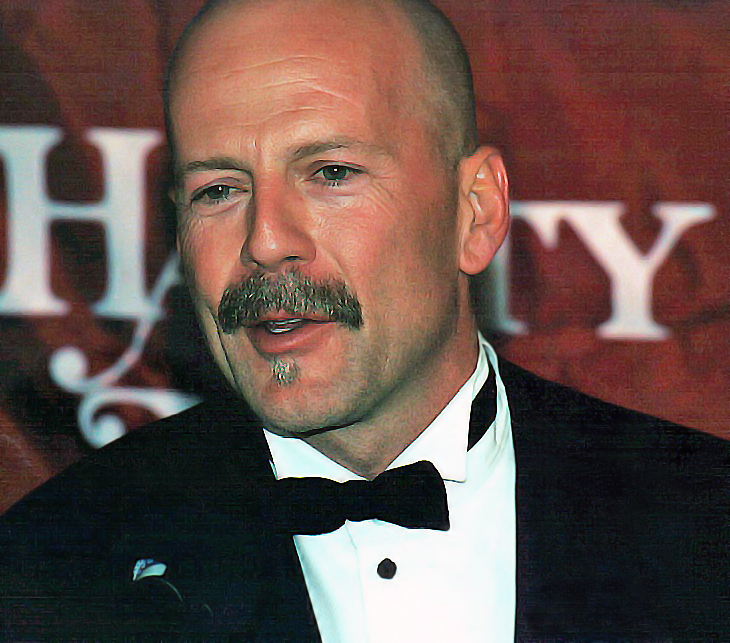
At a Hasty Pudding Theatricals ceremony in 2002

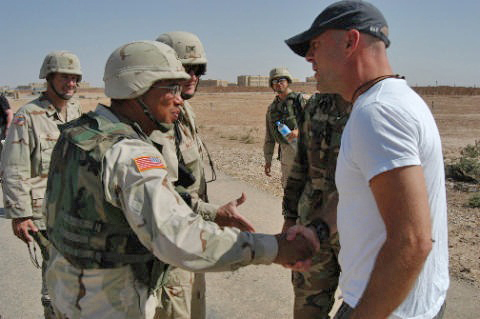
Brigadier General Albert Bryant Jr. (left) meets with Willis (right) in Iraq (2003)

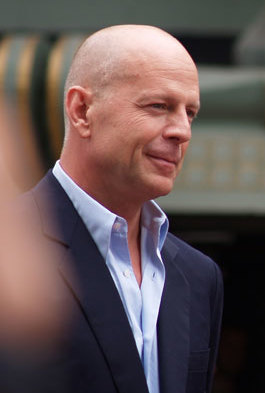
Being presented his star on the Hollywood Walk of Fame in 2006

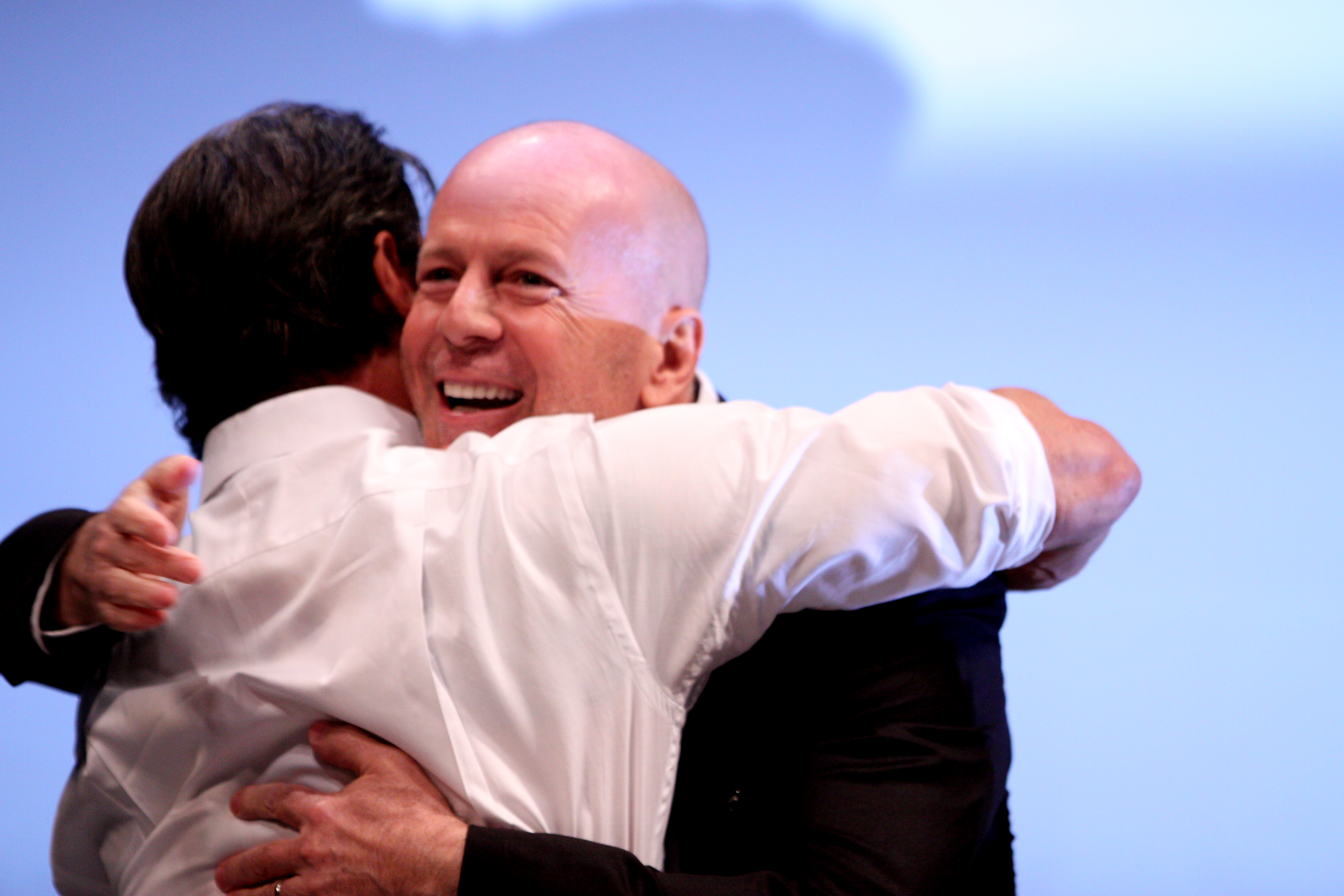
Willis hugging Sylvester Stallone in 2010

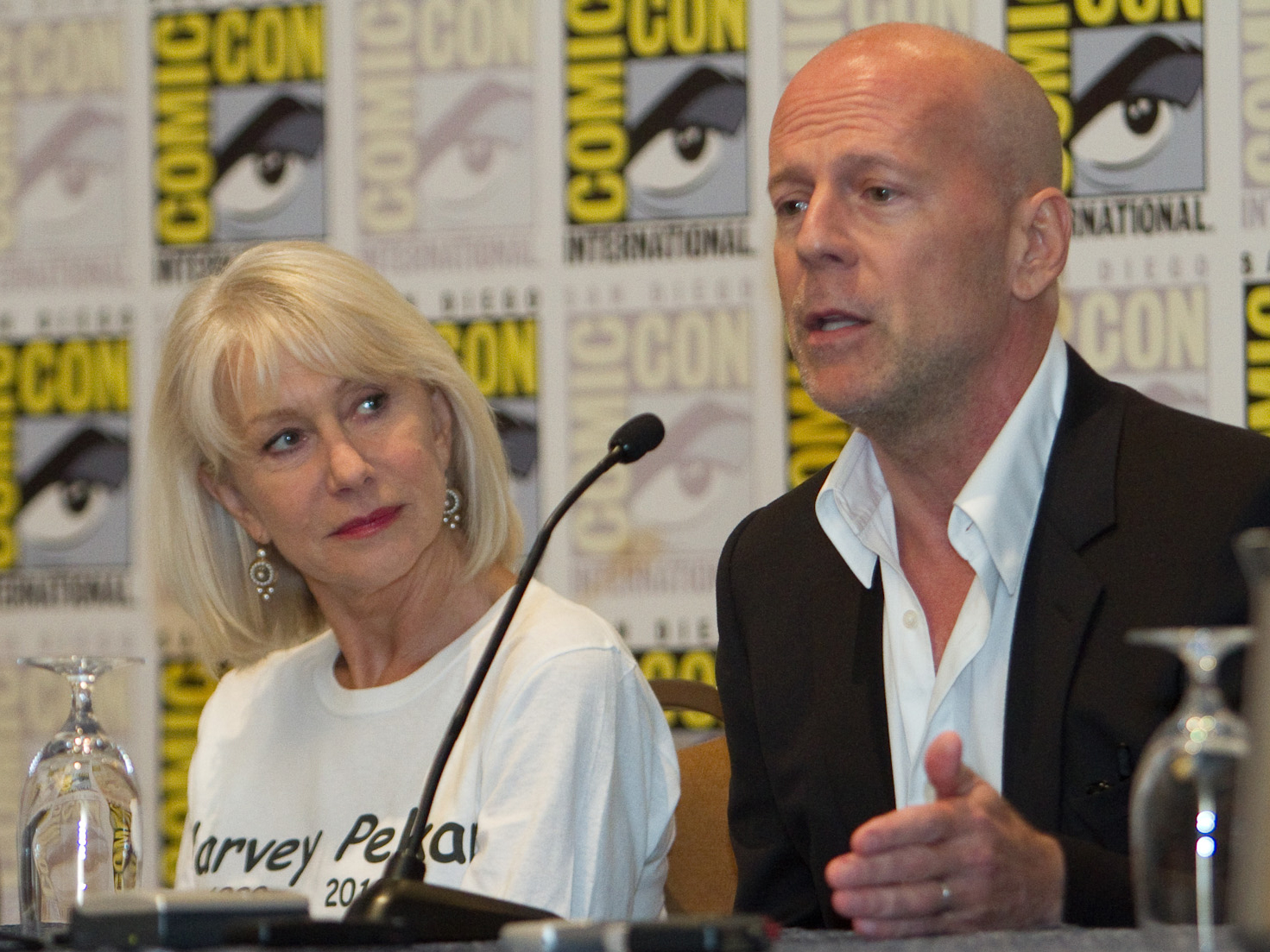
Willis with Helen Mirren at the 2010 San Diego Comic-Con for Red

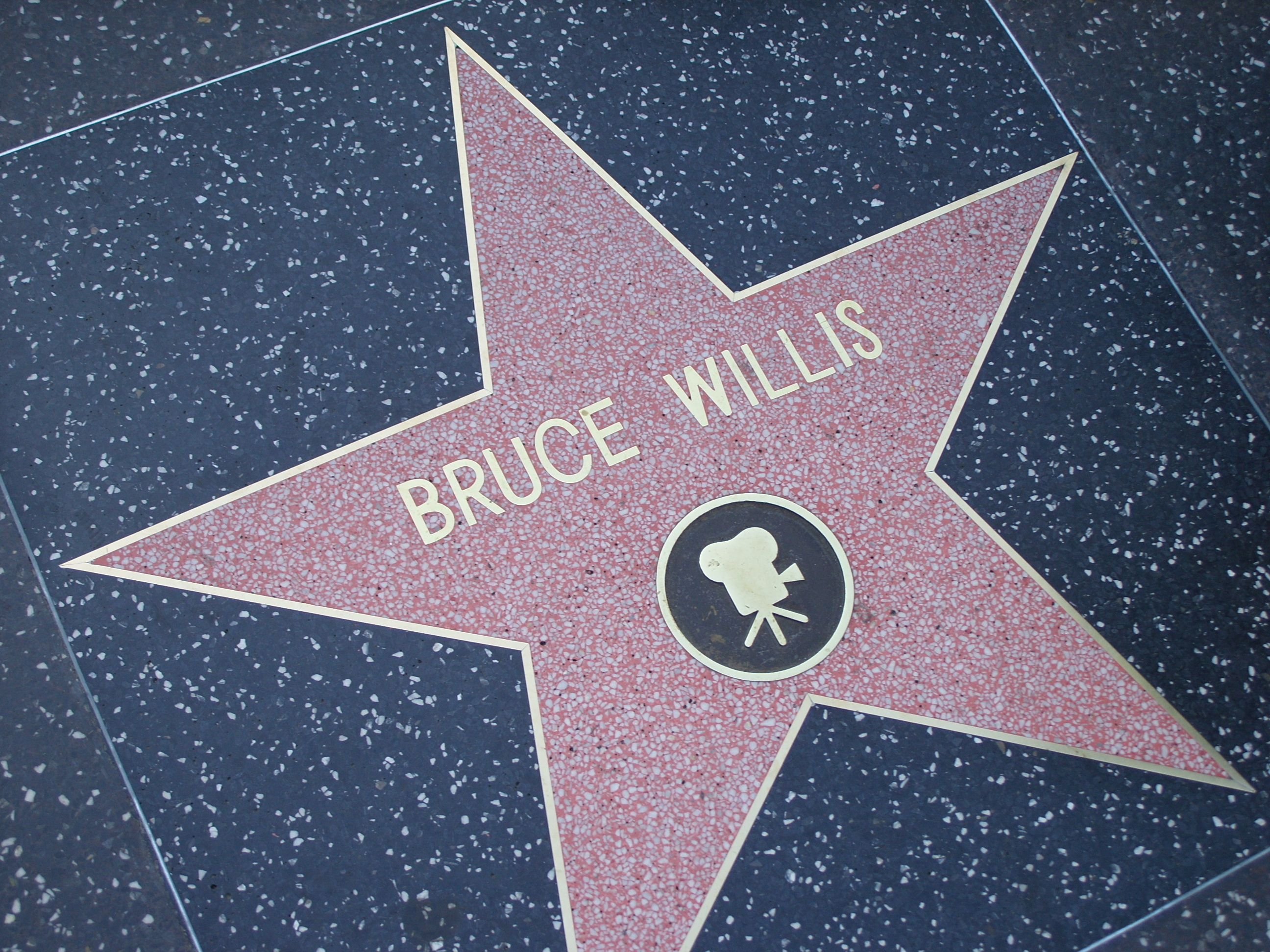
Willis' star on the Hollywood Walk of Fame

Bruce Willis' film credits
Year	Title	Role	Notes	Ref(s)
1980	The First Deadly Sin	Man entering diner	Uncredited	
1982	The Verdict	Courtroom observer	Uncredited	
1987	Blind Date	Walter Davis		
1988	Sunset	Tom Mix		
1988	Die Hard	John McClane		
1989	In Country	Emmett Smith		
1989	Look Who's Talking	Mikey Ubriacco	Voice role	
1990	That's Adequate	Himself		
1990	Die Hard 2	John McClane		
1990	Look Who's Talking Too	Mikey Ubriacco	Voice role	
1990	The Bonfire of the Vanities	Peter Fallow		
1991	Mortal Thoughts	James "Jimmy" Urbanski		
1991	Hudson Hawk	Hudson Hawk	Also story writer	
1991	Billy Bathgate	Bo Weinberg		
1991	The Last Boy Scout	Joe Hallenbeck		
1992	The Player	Himself	Cameo	
1992	Death Becomes Her	Dr. Ernest Menville		
1993	Loaded Weapon 1	John McClane	Uncredited cameo	
1993	Striking Distance	Thomas "Tom" Hardy		
1994	Pulp Fiction	Butch Coolidge		
1994	North	Narrator and benevolent advisors		
1994	Color of Night	Dr. Bill Capa		
1994	Nobody's Fool	Carl Roebuck		
1995	Die Hard with a Vengeance	John McClane		
1995	Four Rooms	Leo	Uncredited; segment: "The Man from Hollywood"	
1995	12 Monkeys	James Cole		
1996	Last Man Standing	John Smith		
1996	Beavis and Butt-Head Do America	Muddy Grimes	Voice role	
1997	The Fifth Element	Korben Dallas		
1997	The Jackal	The Jackal		
1997	Broadway Brawler	Eddie Kapinsky	Also producer; cancelled in production	
1998	Mercury Rising	Art Jeffries		
1998	Armageddon	Harry S. Stamper		
1998	The Siege	General William Devereaux		
1999	Breakfast of Champions	Dwayne Hoover		
1999	The Sixth Sense	Malcolm Crowe		
1999	The Story of Us	Ben Jordan		
2000	The Whole Nine Yards	James Stefan "Jimmy the Tulip" Tudeski		
2000	The Kid	Russ Duritz		
2000	Unbreakable	David Dunn		
2001	Bandits	Joe Blake		
2002	Hart's War	Col. William A. McNamara		
2002	Grand Champion	Mr. Blandford		
2002	The Crocodile Hunter: Collision Course	—N/a	Executive producer	
2003	Tears of the Sun	Lieutenant Alec Kevin "A.K." Waters		
2003	Rugrats Go Wild	Spike	Voice role	
2003	Charlie's Angels: Full Throttle	William Rose Bailey	Uncredited	
2004	The Whole Ten Yards	James Stefan "Jimmy the Tulip" Tudeski		
2004	Ocean's Twelve	Himself	Cameo	
2005	Hostage	Jeff Talley	Also producer	
2005	Sin City	John Hartigan	Segment: That Yellow Bastard	
2006	Alpha Dog	Sonny Truelove		
2006	Lucky Number Slevin	Mr. Goodkat		
2006	16 Blocks	Jack Mosley		
2006	Over the Hedge	RJ	Voice role	
2006	Fast Food Nation	Harry Rydell		
2006	The Astronaut Farmer	Doug Masterson	Uncredited	
2006	Hammy's Boomerang Adventure	RJ	Voice role; short film	
2006	The Hip Hop Project	Himself	Also executive producer; documentary film	
2007	Perfect Stranger	Harrison Hill		
2007	Planet Terror	Lt. Muldoon		
2007	Live Free or Die Hard	John McClane		
2007	Nancy Drew	Himself	Uncredited cameo	
2008	Assassination of a High School President	Principal Jared T. Kirkpatrick	Direct-to-video	
2008	What Just Happened	Himself		
2009	Surrogates	Tom Greer		
2010	Cop Out	Jimmy Monroe		
2010	The Expendables	Mr. Church	Uncredited cameo	
2010	I'm Still Here	Himself	Mockumentary	
2010	Red	Frank Moses		
2011	The Black Mamba	Mr. Suave	Short film	
2011	Setup	Biggs	Direct-to-video	
2011	Catch .44	Mel	Direct-to-video	
2012	Lay the Favorite	Dink Heimowitz		
2012	The Cold Light of Day	Martin Shaw		
2012	Moonrise Kingdom	Captain Duffy Sharp		
2012	The Expendables 2	Mr. Church		
2012	Looper	Old Joe		
2012	Fire with Fire	Lt. Mike Cella	Direct-to-video	
2013	A Good Day to Die Hard	John McClane		
2013	G.I. Joe: Retaliation	General Joseph Colton		
2013	Red 2	Frank Moses		
2014	Sin City: A Dame to Kill For	John Hartigan		
2014	The Prince	Omar	Video on Demand	
2015	Vice	Julian Michaels	Video on Demand	
2015	Rock the Kasbah	Bombay Brian		
2015	Extraction	Leonard Turner	Video on Demand	
2016	Precious Cargo	Eddie Pilosa	Video on Demand	
2016	Marauders	Jeffrey Hubert	Video on Demand	
2016	Split	David Dunn	Uncredited cameo	
2017	Once Upon a Time in Venice	Steve Ford		
2017	First Kill	Marvin Howell	Video on Demand	
2018	Acts of Violence	Detective James Avery	Video on Demand	
2018	Death Wish	Paul Kersey		
2018	Reprisal	James	Video on Demand	
2018	Air Strike	Col. Jack Johnson	Video on Demand	
2019	Glass	David Dunn		
2019	The Lego Movie 2: The Second Part	Himself	Voice cameo	
2019	Motherless Brooklyn	Frank Minna		
2019	10 Minutes Gone	Rex	Video on Demand	
2019	Trauma Center	Lt. Steve Wakes	Video on Demand	
2020	Survive the Night	Frank Clark	Video on Demand	
2020	Hard Kill	Donovan Chalmers	Video on Demand	
2020	Breach	Clay Young	Video on Demand	
2021	Cosmic Sin	James Ford	Video on Demand	
2021	Out of Death	Jack Harris	Video on Demand	
2021	Midnight in the Switchgrass	Karl Helter	Video on Demand	
2021	Survive the Game	David Watson	Video on Demand	
2021	Apex	Thomas Malone	Video on Demand	
2021	Deadlock	Ron Whitlock	Video on Demand	
2021	Fortress	Robert Michaels	Video on Demand	
2022	American Siege	Ben Watts	Video on Demand	
2022	Gasoline Alley	Detective Bill Freeman	Video on Demand	
2022	A Day to Die	Alston	Video on Demand	
2022	Corrective Measures	Julius Loeb	Video on Demand	
2022	Fortress: Sniper's Eye	Robert Michaels	Video on Demand	
2022	Vendetta	Donnie Fetter	Video on Demand	
2022	White Elephant	Arnold Solomon	Video on Demand	
2022	Wrong Place	Frank Richards	Video on Demand	
2022	Wire Room	Shane Mueller	Video on Demand	
2022	Detective Knight: Rogue	Detective James Knight	Video on Demand	
2022	Paradise City	Ian Swan	Video on Demand	
2022	Detective Knight: Redemption	Detective James Knight	Video on Demand	
2023	Detective Knight: Independence	Detective James Knight	Video on Demand	
2023	Assassin	Valmora	Video on Demand	

== Television ==
Bruce Willis' television credits
Year	Title	Role	Notes	Ref(s)
1980	A Guru Comes	Extra	Uncredited; television film	
1984	Miami Vice	Tony Amato	Episode: "No Exit"	
1985–1989	Moonlighting	David Addison	Main role	
1985	The Twilight Zone	Peter Novins	Segment: "Shatterday"	
1987	The Return of Bruno	Bruno Radolini	Also writer and executive producer; television film	
1989	Roseanne	Himself	Uncredited cameo; episode: "Dear Mom and Dad"	
1989; 2013	Saturday Night Live	Himself (host)	2 episodes	
1996–1997	Bruno the Kid	Bruno the Kid	Voice role; also developer and executive producer	
1997	Mad About You	Himself	Episode: "The Birth Part 2"	
1999	Ally McBeal	Dr. Nickle	Episode: "Love Unlimited"	
2000	Friends	Paul Stevens	3 episodes	
2004	Touching Evil	—N/a	Executive producer; 12 episodes	
2005	That '70s Show	Vic	Episode: "Misfire"	
2018	Comedy Central Roast	Himself	Television special	
2018	Bumping Mics with Jeff Ross & Dave Attell	Himself	Episode: "Friday"	
2019	The Orville	Groogen	Uncredited voice role; episode: "Deflectors"	

== Broadway ==
Bruce Willis' broadway credits
Year	Title	Role	Notes	Ref(s)
1984–1985; 1997	Fool for Love	Eddie	Understudy (1^{st} version); Also producer (2^{nd} version)	
2002	True West	Lee	Also executive producer; Filmed broadway play	
2015–2016	Misery	Paul Sheldon	102 performances	
2017	Must	—N/a	Producer only	
2021	My Mother's Severed Head	—N/a	Producer only	

== Music videos ==
Year	Title	Role	Artist	Ref(s)
1986	Respect Yourself	Bruno	Himself	
2010	Stylo	Assassin	Gorillaz	

== Video games ==
Year	Title	Role	Notes	Ref(s)
1998	The Fifth Element	Korben Dallas	Voice role and likeness	
1998	Apocalypse	Trey Kincaid	Voice role and likeness	
2021	Call of Duty: Black Ops Cold War	John McClane	Archive audio and likeness	
2021	Call of Duty: Warzone	John McClane	Archive audio and likeness	

== See also ==
- List of awards and nominations received by Bruce Willis
