= Detective Knight (film series) =

Film series article

- Official film series logo
- Based on: Original characters by Edward John Drake & Corey Large
- Starring: Bruce Willis; Lochlyn Munro; Jimmy Jean-Louis; Various (See list below)
- Production companies: Emmett/Furla Oasis Films; Buffalo 8 Productions
- Distributed by: Lionsgate
- Country: United States
- Language: English
- Box office: $341,525 (3 films)

The Detective Knight film series consists of American action films, directed by Edward John Drake from original stories he co-wrote with Corey Large. The series details the police investigations of veteran Detective James Knight, played by Bruce Willis, and is notable for being one of his final roles before retiring from acting due to his health struggles with aphasia and frontotemporal dementia diagnoses. The plot of each film centers around a different holiday and follows the lead character's attempts to resolve the associated criminal activities.

The movies have been met with mixed reception overall. The first installment, its sequel, and the third and final release were collectively criticized for their pace, story elements, B-movie quality, and script. Conversely, elements of the movies received positive reactions for the writer/director's storytelling framework around Willis, while honoring his legacy with limited lines to respectfully utilize his legacy presence, regardless of his diminishing health problems, with praise directed at the film series' action sequences. The film series earned $341,525 at the box office through limited international theatrical distribution.

== Films ==
=== Detective Knight: Rogue (2022) ===
Det. James Knight, whose reputation is in question with the police force, is called into action when a series of masked bank robberies taking place during the Halloween season plague the area. Working through the investigation with his friend Det. Eric "Fitz" Fitzgerald, and with the help of their colleague Det. Godwin Sango, the trio find a trail of clues that leads them to connections with a businessman named Winna. Coming to terms with demons from his past, Knight begins to discover that the gang of thieves may be an inside job. (Note: According to various sources:)

=== Detective Knight: Redemption (2022) ===
After killing a pair of thieves to save his police partner, Det. James Knight finds himself sentenced to serve a term in prison. After Det. Fitzgerald begins to clear his name, Knight is tasked with investigating potential connections to a series of events being examined by the police department, all while being surrounded by criminals he helped to incarcerate. During Christmastime a former ex-convict-turned-chaplain of the facility named Ricky Conlan organizes a jailbreak as a means to fight the commercial aspects of the holiday under the alias of the Christmas Bomber, alongside his band of lawbreakers who call themselves the Real Saints of Christmas. Now given the chance of exoneration in clearing his name, with the decades of experience Det. Knight must stop the plans the group has planned before it's too late. (Note: According to various sources:)

=== Detective Knight: Independence (2023) ===
Det. James Knight is called into action one last time when the threat of a domestic terrorist group causing commotion once again arises. As the celebration of the nation's Independence Day approaches, a disgruntled former EMT-turned-criminal named Dezi, alongside his girlfriend Ally, plans to complete a heist in compensation for recently being fired. With the help of ex-criminal father Vincent, they assemble a team to take a large sum of money and escape before they're discovered. When they begin to leave a trail of murders in their wake, Knight grows closer to solving the case and ending their spree. (Note: According to various sources:)

Film	U.S. release date	Director	Screenwriter	Story by	Producers
Detective Knight: Rogue	October 21, 2022	Edward Drake	Edward Drake	Corey Large & Edward Drake	Corey Large, George Furla & Randall Emmett
Detective Knight: Redemption	December 9, 2022	Edward Drake	Edward Drake	Corey Large & Edward Drake	Corey Large, George Furla & Randall Emmett
Detective Knight: Independence	January 23, 2023	Edward Drake	Edward Drake	Corey Large & Edward Drake	Corey Large & Robert Dean

== Main cast and characters ==
List indicators

This section includes characters who will appear or have appeared in the franchise in main roles.

- An empty grey cell indicates the character was not in the film, or that the character's official presence has not yet been confirmed.
- ^{A} indicates an appearance through archival footage or audio.
- ^{C} indicates a cameo role.
- ^{P} indicates an appearance in onscreen photographs.

Character	Films		
Character	Detective Knight: Rogue	Detective Knight: Redemption	Detective Knight: Independence
Principal cast
Det. James Knight	Bruce Willis	Bruce Willis	Bruce Willis
Det. Eric "Fitz" Fitzgerald	Lochlyn Munro	Lochlyn Munro	Lochlyn Munro
Det. Godwin Sango	Jimmy Jean-Louis	Jimmy Jean-Louis	Jimmy Jean-Louis
Winna	Michael Eklund	Michael Eklund^{A}^{P}^{C}	
Casey Rhodes	Beau Mirchoff	Beau Mirchoff	
Mercer	Corey Large	Corey Large	
Mike Rochester	Trevor Gretzsky		
Nikki Sykes	Keeya King		
Ricky Conlan The Christmas Bomber	Paul Johansson	Paul Johansson	
Dajon	Cody Kearsley	Cody Kearsley	
Maxwell Roy	Sarah May Sommers	Sarah May Sommers	
Jerry Leach	Nels Lennarson	Nels Lennarson	
Dezi			Jack Kilmer
Ally			Willow Shields
Vincent			Timothy V. Murphy
Supporting cast
Capt. Anna Shea	Miranda Edwards	Miranda Edwards	
Mayor Vassetti	John Cassini	John Cassini	
Arthur Vassetti	Jerry Yu	Jerry Yu	
Lily Rhodes	Hunter Daily	Hunter Daily	
Clara Rhodes	Alice Comer	Alice Comer	
Brigga	Johnny Messner	Johnny Messner^{A}^{P}^{C}	
The Chess Master	Ryan Xue	Ryan Xue	
COP Charlotte Burnham			Dina Meyer
Peter O'Malley			Francis Cronin
Sean Beston			Scott Cargle
Nico			Michael Sparks
Kirill			Mark Hewlett
George			Lorenzo Antonucci
Quinn			Dax Spangole

== Additional crew and production details ==
Title	Crew/Detail					
Title	Composer	Cinematographer	Editor	Production companies	Distributing companies	Running time
Detective Knight: Rogue	Scott Currie	Laffrey Witbrod	Justin Williams	Lions Gate Films; Buffalo 8 Productions; Emmett/Furla Oasis Films	Lionsgate	105 mins
Detective Knight: Redemption	Scott Currie	Laffrey Witbrod	Justin Williams	Lions Gate Films; Buffalo 8 Productions; Emmett/Furla Oasis Films	Lionsgate	93 mins
Detective Knight: Independence	Scott Currie	Laffrey Witbrod	Justin Williams	Lions Gate Films; Buffalo 8 Productions; Emmett/Furla Oasis Films	Lionsgate	91 mins

== Reception ==
=== Box office and financial performance ===
Film	Box office gross			Box office ranking		Ref.
Film	North America	Other territories	Worldwide	All time North America	All time worldwide	Ref.
Detective Knight: Rogue	—N/a	$95,244	$95,244	—N/a	#31,475	
Detective Knight: Redemption	—N/a	$192,939	$192,939	—N/a	Information not publicly available	
Detective Knight: Independence	—N/a	$53,342	$53,342	—N/a	Information not publicly available	
Totals	—N/a	$341,525	$341,525	—N/a	x̄ #10,492	

=== Critical and public response ===
Film	Rotten Tomatoes	Metacritic
Detective Knight: Rogue	43% (7 reviews)	—N/a
Detective Knight: Redemption	67% (6 reviews)	—N/a (2 reviews)
Detective Knight: Independence	43% (7 reviews)	—N/a
