= The Razor's Edge (disambiguation) =

The Razor's Edge is a 1944 novel by W. Somerset Maugham.

The Razor's Edge may also refer to:

== Film and television ==
- The Razor's Edge (1946 film), a film adaptation of Maugham's novel, starring Tyrone Power
- The Razor's Edge (1984 film), a film adaptation of Maugham's novel, starring Bill Murray
- The Razor's Edge (upcoming film), an upcoming American film starring James Franco
- The Razor's Edge, an Australian film of 2005
- "The Razor's Edge", an episode of The Apprentice
- "The Razor's Edge", an episode of Married... with Children
- "Razor's Edge", an episode of SWAT Kats: The Radical Squadron
- "Razor's Edge", an episode of Voltron: Legendary Defender

== Literature ==
- Razor's Edge (novel), a novel by Ivan Yefremov
- Razor's Edge, a novel by Lisanne Norman
- Razor's Edge, a novel by Dale Brown and Jim DeFelice
- Razor's Edge: The Unofficial History of the Falklands War, a book by Hugh Bicheno

== Music ==
- The Razor's Edge, a '60s pop rock group
- The Razors Edge (AC/DC album), or the title song, 1990
- The Razor's Edge (Dave Holland album) or the title instrumental, 1987
- Razor's Edge, an album by the Groundhogs, 1985
- "Razor's Edge" (Goanna song), 1983
- "Razor's Edge" (Meat Loaf song), 1983
- "Razor's Edge", a song by Saliva from Survival of the Sickest
- Razor's Edge, the fifth and final movement of "Octavarium", a song by Dream Theater
- "Edge of the Razor", a song by Stephanie Mills from I've Got the Cure, 1984

== Other uses ==
- Ninja Gaiden 3: Razor's Edge, a 2012 video game
- Razor's Edge, a version of the crucifix powerbomb, a professional wrestling move

== See also ==
- Raiser's Edge, fundraising database program produced by Blackbaud
- Walkin' the Razor's Edge, 1984 album by Helix, a Canadian heavy metal band
