= Scott Glasgow =

American composer

Scott Glasgow (born c. 1976) is an American film composer, conductor, and musician known for his work on numerous feature films and other visual media. He has composed scores for a variety of genres, including science fiction, horror, and action films, and has been recognized for his ability to blend traditional orchestral elements with contemporary production techniques.

== Education and career ==
Glasgow has a Bachelor of Music from California State University, Northridge and a Master of Music from the San Francisco Conservatory of Music in 2001 where he was a student of Conrad Susa. He studied with John Corigliano at the Aspen Music Festival 2002 and was in the ASACP Film Scoring program in 2004. Since 2005 has made his career as a film composer with over 20+ studio features to date. He also teaches at the university level, with classes in film scoring at CSUN California State University, Northridge and UCLA University of California, Los Angeles. He has contributed addition music to films, TV and games including video games DC Universe Online, TV shows HBO Curb Your Enthusiasm and CBS 60 Minutes and feature films Captain America: Civil War.

In 2018, the Dallas Chamber Symphony commissioned Glasgow to write an original musical score for Our Hospitality starring Buster Keaton. It premiered during a concert screening at Moody Performance Hall on October 13, 2018 with Richard McKay conducting.

== Filmography ==
- They (2002) – assistant composer
- The 5 Coolest Things (2003) – composer
- Wrong Turn (2003) – assistant composer
- Runaway Jury (2003) – score technical assistant
- An Unfinished Life (2005) – score coordinator
- Spider-Man 2 (2004) – score preparation
- The Grudge (2004) – score coordinator (uncredited)
- Dark Kingdom: The Dragon King (2004) – orchestrator
- Nine Lives (2005) – score preparation
- Build or Bust (2005) – additional music
- The Skeleton Key (2005) – score preparation
- Chasing Ghosts (2005) – composer
- Robotech: The Shadow Chronicles (2006) – composer
- Hack! (2006) – composer
- Toxic (2007) – composer
- Bone Dry (2007) – composer
- The Gene Generation (2008) – composer
- Lo (2008) – composer **IFMCA Award Nominee**
- The Bridge to Nowhere (2009) – composer
- Taking Chances (2009) – composer
- Hollywood & Wine (2010) – composer
- National Lampoon's 301: The Legend of Awesomest Maximus (2010) – composer
- Riddle (2013) – composer
- Hatchet III (2013) – composer
- The Wedding Pact (2013) – composer
- Secrets of a Psychopath (2014) – composer
- Poker Night (2014) – composer
- The Curse of Sleeping Beauty (2015) – composer **HMMA Award Winner**
- Captain America: Civil War (2016) – composer (additional music)
- Ghosthunters (2016) – composer
- Stasis (2017) – composer
- Slay Belles (2018) – composer
- The Ninth Passenger (2018) – composer
- Trauma Therapy (2019) – composer
- Slayer: The Repentless Killogy (2019) – composer
- Attack Of The Unknown (2020) – composer
- Breach (2020) – composer
- Cosmic Sin (2021) – composer
- Manipulated (2021) – composer
- Bloodthirst (2022) – composer
- Deathcount (2022) – composer
- The Wedding Pact 2: The Baby Pact (2022) – composer
- The Night Of The Tommyknockers (2022) – composer
- Unsinkable (2024) – composer

== Discography ==
- Chasing Ghosts (2005) – Movie Score Media
- Robotech: The Shadow Chronicles (2006) – Varèse Sarabande
- Hack! (2006) – Movie Score Media
- Bone Dry (2008) – Intrada Records
- Toxic (2009) – Movie Score Media
- The Gene Generation (2009) – Varèse Sarabande
- Lo (2010) – Movie Score Media
- Riddle (2013) – Varèse Sarabande
- Secrets of a Psychopath (2015) – Movie Score Media
- Hatchet III (2015) – Intrada Records
- Poker Night (2015) – Movie Score Media
- Totem EP (2017) – Fourteen Kings Music
- Stasis (2017) – Fourteen Kings Music
- Slay Belles (2018) – Fourteen Kings Music
- The Ninth Passenger (2018) – Fourteen Kings Music
- Trauma Therapy (2019) – Fourteen Kings Music
- Breach (2020) – Fourteen Kings Music
- Attack Of The Unknown (2020) – Fourteen Kings Music
- Cosmic Sin (2021) – The Orchard
- Manipulated (2021) – Fourteen Kings Music

== List of compositions (concert music) ==
- "Mass" for Mixed Choir (a cappella)
- "Betelgeuse" for Solo Amplified Cello with digital effects
- "Gothic Fragments" for mixed instruments
- "Piano Trio 'Earthquake'" for Piano Trio (inspired by the 1994 Northridge, California Earthquake)
- "Three" (slow movement from Piano Trio, simplified for children's level playing).
- "Silver Sound" for Two Percussionists
- "Hyper-Reality" for Orchestra
- "Temporal Fuges" for String Quartet
- "Wind Quintet ' Winter Music'" for Woodwind Quartet
- "Tenebrae" for String Orchestra
- "Petrarch Songs" for Mezzo-Soprano and Piano (based on text of Petrarch).
- "The Prince Of Venosa" (an Opera In Two Acts with a Prologue and Epilogue – based on the life of Don Carlo Gesualdo).
- "Sappho Songs" for Medium Voice and Piano (based on text of Sappho).
- "Dreams Of Poe" for Choir and Orchestra (based on the dream poetry of Edgar Allan Poe). (2005) Three Movements : 1. A Dream 2. Dream 3. Dreams

== Other works ==
- "The Turning Wheel" for Solo Guitar (1987)
- "Serenade" for Solo Guitar (Wedding Celebration) (1998)

== Awards ==
In 2010 Glasgow was nominated for Best Original Score for a Comedy Film by the International Film Music Critics Association for his work on director Travis Betz's romantic comedy horror film Lo. In 2016 Glasgow won a Hollywood Music in Media Award, in the category for best original score in an independent film, for his work on The Curse of Sleeping Beauty.
