= Stand Against Fear =

1996 film by Joseph L. Scanlan

- Genre: Drama
- Written by: Natalie Chaidez
- Directed by: Joseph L. Scanlan
- Starring: Sarah Chalke; Shanna Reed; Lochlyn Munro; Josh Taylor
- Music by: Stacy Widelitz
- Country of origin: United States
- Original language: English

Production
- Executive producer: Lawrence Horowitz
- Producer: Tracey Jeffrey
- Cinematography: Malcolm Cross
- Editor: Michael A. Hoey
- Running time: 89 minutes
- Production companies: Libra Pictures; O'Hara-Horowitz Productions

Original release
- Network: NBC
- Release: December 16, 1996

Stand Against Fear (also called Unlikely Suspects) is a 1996 American made-for-television drama film starring Sarah Chalke as a cheerleader who takes action when she faces sexual intimidation from football players at her school. The film is a part of the Moment of Truth franchise and aired on NBC on December 16, 1996.

The film was based on a real-life incident, which occurred at Santa Clara High School in California.

== Plot ==
Krista Wilson (Sarah Chalke) is a cheerleading captain at Centennial High School who is subjected to sexual harassment by members of her the varsity football team, particularly captain Josh Kelly (Munro) and his friend Nelson Doyle. After Krista's best friend Ruth gets manhandled badly while passing out bottled water on a football team bus, Krista finds out that most of the squad has been dealing with such mistreatment. She reports the incident to new coach Ron Peters, who lightly talks it over with Josh, but the team captain denies it all.

Undeterred, Josh and Nelson continue their campaign of harassment. The pair corner Krista in the girls' locker room, where Josh gropes her until Ruth intervenes. A terrified Krista tells her mother Anne (Shanna Reed), who is also a counselor at the school, what happened, and she brings it to the attention of both Coach Peters and principal Vicky Cooke. A meeting is later scheduled to address the accusations, but after Krista presents her story, Josh counters by claiming that her accusations are just a form of retaliation because he supposedly resisted advances Krista made towards him. Siding with the football team, Ms. Cooke and Coach Peters decide to suspend the cheerleading squad for the remainder of the year.

Outraged by the injustice, Anne discusses the idea of legal action with her husband Ted (Josh Taylor). Despite his initial reluctance, Ted comes around and agrees, but emphasizes that Ruth's testimony is key if they want the charges to stick. Realizing this, Anne tries to convince Ruth's mother Mona to come forward about what she saw, but Mona is greatly concerned about Ruth jeopardizing her college scholarship by doing so. Meanwhile, Krista's brother Kyle, who was recently given a coveted spot on the football team, seems to agree with Josh's version of what transpired and dismisses his sister's charges as false.

Following Anne's directive, several detectives arrive at the school to bring Josh and Nelson in for questioning, but after being advised by Josh's lawyer father Alan not to speak, they decline to give a statement, and the pair are released. Alan later shows up at Ted's restaurant and tries to convince him to make Krista back down, but Ted refuses, stating he won't sell his daughter out.

After an incident at the homecoming dance in which Nelson spills punch on Ruth, Krista is able to convince her to testify before the school board. However, rather than backing her friend up, Ruth instead corroborates Josh's version of events and makes Krista out to be a liar. To make matters worse, Anne later receives a request for her resignation from the school district, claiming that allowing the police on campus was an abuse of her authority. Blaming his sister for the turmoil, Kyle erupts at her, but Anne sets him straight, reminding Kyle that despite his athletic success, family is far more important than popularity, while Ted assures Krista that no one blames her for anything, and that he and her mother will do whatever it takes to fight back.

Making good on his word, Ted secures the services of a well-known law firm, which hears Anne and Krista's argument and agrees to take the case, but warns them that it will be difficult to pursue without hard evidence. In the meantime, Josh makes another unwanted advance toward Ruth, but Kyle witnesses it (as does Josh's girlfriend Vanessa) and intervenes. Angry, Josh confronts Kyle, but their teammate Randy steps in before it turns physical.

Krista later confronts Ruth about her betrayal, who admits that she was threatened with the loss of her scholarship by Ms. Cooke and Coach Peters. However, despite this setback, things turn around when Randy and Vanessa show up with some hard evidence: a "Slam Book" kept by Josh, critiquing the cheerleaders' physical attributes, as well as a drawing depicting the bus incident. Krista later thanks her brother for helping to get the book, and Kyle expresses guilt for his past behavior and apologizes to his sister for being a jerk.

Now that actual evidence has been brought to light, the attorney from the family's law firm is able to move forward with their case, causing the school grounds to be abuzz with reporters. Having been informed that she was named as a defendant in the lawsuit, Ms. Cooke angrily confronts Anne, but she stands firm, reminding Vicky that she failed to protect the girls in the name of possibly winning a football trophy. Vicky then reminds Anne that she was supposed to tender her resignation, but Anne informs her that as per the conditions of the suit, this cannot be done until after the issue has been resolved (by which time, as Anne points out, Centennial may have a new principal).

As news of the suit becomes public, the Wilsons soon become targets of an intimidation campaign, but they refuse to back down. The family later meets with the defense attorneys, who offer a settlement of $15,000 for each of the cheerleaders, as well as their reinstatement on the school squad, but inform them that doing so will absolve the school of any culpability in what happened to the girls. After being told that the rest of the cheerleaders have already accepted, Krista gives an impassioned speech to her squad on the importance of standing up against the football team, and the cheerleaders decide to fight back, Ruth even apologizing to Krista for her earlier betrayal.

Despite a subsequent offer of even more money from the district, all of the cheerleaders refuse, and each of them take the stand to tell their experiences over the course of the nearly four-week trial. In the end, the district is held accountable for allowing and attempting to cover up the sexual harassment, each of the girls are awarded $50,000 in damages, and both Josh and Nelson are barred from playing football for the rest of their high school careers.

== Cast ==
- Sarah Chalke as Krista Wilson
- Shanna Reed as Anne Wilson
- Lochlyn Munro as Josh Kelly
- Brigitta Dau as Ruth Gayle
- Josh Taylor as Ted Wilson
- Gwynyth Walsh as Principal Vicky Cooke
- Teryl Rothery as Lawyer
- Garry Chalk as Coach Ron Peters
- Malcolm Stewart as Supt. Emerson
- Alandra as Mona Gayle
- Gaetana Korbin as Vanessa
- Terry David Mulligan as Alan Kelly
- Kirby Morrow as Nelson Doyle
- Jason Nash as Randy
- Marcus Turner as Kyle Wilson
