= Poker Night (film) =

- Theatrical release poster
- Directed by: Greg Francis
- Written by: Greg Francis
- Produced by: Corey Large
- Starring: Ron Eldard; Beau Mirchoff; Ron Perlman; Giancarlo Esposito
- Cinematography: Brandon Cox
- Edited by: Howard E. Smith
- Music by: Scott Glasgow
- Production company: Wingman Productions
- Distributed by: XLrator Media
- Release dates: December 5, 2014 (VOD); December 20, 2014 (theatrical release)
- Running time: 104 minutes
- Countries: United States, Canada
- Language: English

Poker Night, released in the UK as The Joker, is a 2014 crime thriller film that was written and directed by Greg Francis. Released to video on demand on 5 December 2014, it had a limited theatrical release on 20 December. Filmed in British Columbia, Poker Night centers on a rookie detective who attends an annual poker night held by veteran police officers, where each one details how they captured a murder suspect.

== Plot ==
Stan Jeter (Beau Mirchoff) is a new detective invited to play a game of poker with several veteran police officers and detectives. Each tells Stan about the insights they gained from murder cases they investigated, which turns out to be invaluable when Stan is captured and imprisoned by a vicious, anonymous assailant (Michael Eklund). Imprisoned with Amy (Halston Sage), the daughter of a police officer, Stan must use the stories of his fellow poker players to find a way for them both to escape.

== Cast ==
- Beau Mirchoff as Stan Jeter
- Ron Perlman as Calabrese
- Giancarlo Esposito as Bernard
- Corey William Large as Davis
- Titus Welliver as Maxwell
- Halston Sage as Amy
- Ron Eldard as Cunningham
- Michael Eklund as The Man
- Kieran Large as Shawn Allen

== Release ==
=== Home media ===
Poker Night was released on DVD and Blu-ray by Xlrator on February 10, 2015.

=== Critical response ===
On review aggregator Rotten Tomatoes, Poker Night holds an approval rating of 50%, based on 10 reviews, and an average rating of 5.39/10. On Metacritic, the film has a weighted average score of 35 out of 100, based on 5 critics, indicating "generally unfavorable reviews".

Dennis Harvey of Variety gave Poker Night a negative review, highlighting its "near-indigestible mix of tricky Pulp Fiction-esque structural convolution, torture-porn tropes and a somewhat distasteful level of snark, making for a self-satisfied puzzle that most viewers will run out of patience trying to unravel." Martin Tsai from Los Angeles Times said the film "brings to mind so many forgettable thrillers from the 1990s, films that aimed to impress stylistically but ultimately were met with indifference." Frank Scheck of The Hollywood Reporter, commended the acting, and "somewhat anthology feel", but criticized the endless voiceover narration, "jumbled timeline", and reliance on genre tropes. Scheck concluded that "although it features plenty of entertaining moments along the way, in the end Poker Night feels like a cheat." Patrick Cooper from Bloody Disgusting felt that the film showed promise and featured good performances, but was ruined by its nonlinear narrative, and inconsistent tone.

The film was not without supporters. Matt Molgaard from HorrorFreakNews rated it 3.5 out of 5 stars, writing, "Poker Night may not satisfy those in search of the goriest film of the year, but anyone up for a unique viewing experience, a strong cast and a damn sharp villain are going to find Poker Night to be more than simply adequate." Matt Boiselle of Dread Central rated it 4 out of 5 stars, commending the film's performances, interwoven stories, and villain.
