= The Legend of Awesomest Maximus =

- Film poster
- Directed by: Jeff Kanew
- Written by: Jason Burinescu
- Produced by: Dan Farah; Jason Burinescu; Charley Cabrera; Lisette Bross; Justin Kanew
- Starring: Will Sasso; Ian Ziering; Kristanna Loken; Sophie Monk; Tony Cox; Rip Torn
- Music by: Scott Glasgow
- Production companies: National Lampoon Productions; Farah Films & Management; Vision Entertainment
- Release date: August 5, 2011
- Running time: 90 minutes
- Country: United States
- Language: English

The Legend of Awesomest Maximus (released in some regions as National Lampoon's 301 and National Lampoon's The Legend of Awesomest Maximus Movie) is a 2011 American comedy film directed by Jeff Kanew, starring Will Sasso. The film is a spoof of epic historical fantasy action films, most notably Troy, Gladiator, and 300, with the plot following a overweight, clueless Trojan general (Sasso) who is tasked with keeping the peace, but unwittingly sets off a war with Greece.

== Plot ==
Awesomest Maximus, a general in the Trojan army who, despite a prophecy of greatness, is a bumbling slacker more interested in food and his difficult wife, Hottessa. Awesomest is married to the princess, and his position of power is largely due to this connection with the aging and senile King Looney.

King Looney sends Awesomest to Greece to negotiate a peace treaty with the flamboyant King Erotic. The mission is a failure when Prince Orlando, Hottessa's gay brother and a fashion enthusiast, convinces King Erotic's wife, Ellen, to leave her husband and become his "best friend forever" (BFF), enraging King Erotic and sparking the Trojan War.

The Trojans face the Greeks in battle with only 300 men, and through some luck (and the help of Qantas and his men), they initially succeed. However, Awesomest's own ineptitude in the field leads his men to accidentally push him off a cliff, while doing it to the Greeks, assuming he is dead.

Awesomest survives the fall and washes ashore in Africa, where he is captured and sold into slavery. He is trained as a gladiator and, surprisingly, becomes a skilled fighter in the arena. During one bout, he accidentally kills Platroklos, the cousin of the mighty Greek warrior Testiclees (a parody of Achilles). This act earns him the furious hatred of Testiclees, though Awesomest manages to escape the arena.

Meanwhile, the war is not going well for the Greeks, who cannot breach the walls of Troy. An exiled Trojan named Minorities, who was banished for being short, proposes a plan to King Erotic: build a giant wooden penis to hide soldiers in and sneak into the city. The plan is successful, and the Greeks penetrate Troy's defenses.

To prevent total slaughter, Awesomest challenges King Erotic to a one-on-one duel, but Erotic sends the formidable Testiclees to fight instead. Awesomest is losing until he discovers Testiclees' secret weakness is his testicles and exploits it, defeating the warrior.

After the duel, King Erotic tries to continue the war, but Prince Orlando confesses that he orchestrated the entire conflict just to get Erotic's attention because he was in love with him. Erotic admits he loves Orlando too, and they share a kiss, ending the war. In the resolution, Ellen is revealed to be a lesbian and moves in with Hottessa and Awesomest.

In the final scene, it is revealed that Awesomest has been telling this entire story to two women in a bar, leaving it a mystery as to whether any of it actually happened or if it was just a drunken tall tale.

== Cast ==
- Will Sasso as Awesomest Maximus, a parody of Hector (Troy) and Maximus Decimus Meridius (Gladiator).
- Ian Ziering as Testiclees, a parody of Achilles (Troy).
- Kristanna Loken as Hottessa, a parody of Andromache (Troy).
- Sophie Monk as Princess Ellen, a parody of Helen (Troy).
- Tony Cox as Minoritees
- Rip Torn as King Looney, a parody of Priamos (Troy).
- Khary Payton as King Erotic, a parody of Agamemnon (Troy) and Commodus (Gladiator).
- Gary Lundy as Orlando, a parody of Paris (Troy).
- Nelson Frazier, Jr. as Ginormous
- Blake Anderson as Stoner Greek Soldier (cameo)
- Adam DeVine as Ephor 1 (cameo)

== Release ==
It was released theatrically in 2011.

=== Home media ===
A DVD/Bluray version was released on March, 20 2012.

== Reception ==
The film is a spoof of 300 but also Gladiator and Troy. Reviews were generally negative or very mixed. A review for HighDefGest was extremely critical of the whole production. A less negative review at BluRayAuthority admitted that "some jokes worked". The German website MovieBreak stated the film had been a critical and commercial failure. In his very negative review for the Oklahoma Gazette, Rod Lott wrote: "All of the energy seems to have been expended on creating “funny” character names, including Hottessa, Ginormous, Milfia, Testiclees, Pervius and Minoritees."
