= Corey William Large =

Canadian writer, actor, and producer and director

Corey William Large (born 18 October 1975) is a Canadian writer, actor, and producer of feature movies.

== Early life and education ==
Large was born and raised in the Prospect Lake area of Saanich near Victoria, British Columbia, Canada. After elementary school, he enrolled at St. Michaels University School.

== Career ==
Large initially found work as a model. At age 21, he moved across the Georgia Strait and enrolled at the Vancouver Film School and later at the American Academy of Dramatic Arts in Los Angeles. He had background roles in the films Excess Baggage and Disturbing Behavior, before moving into post-production and financing projects.

He returned to St. Michaels University School to produce and act in Window Theory. He returned to his native Victoria to begin shooting a series of films, starting with Kid Cannabis.

Large currently splits his time between Santa Monica, Victoria and Hawaii.

== Filmography ==
=== Film ===
Year	Title	Role	Notes
1997	Excess Baggage	Thug	Extra
1998	Disturbing Behavior	Student	Extra
1998	Cold Feet	Male Model	Short film
2004	Death and Texas	Prison Guard	
2005	Window Theory	Ethan Humphries	Also writer and executive producer
2005	Chasing Ghosts	Cole Davies / Keris Alfiri	Also story writer and executive producer
2005	Deep Rescue	Philip	
2007	7-10 Split	—N/a	Executive producer
2007	Tooth and Nail	—N/a	Executive producer
2008	Senior Skip Day	—N/a	Executive producer
2008	The Art of Travel	—N/a	Executive producer
2008	Loaded	Sebastian	Also writer and producer
2008	Toxic	Sid	Also writer and producer
2009	Lies & Illusions	Master Chief	
2009	Cabin Fever 2: Spring Fever	—N/a	Executive producer
2010	Gun	—N/a	Executive producer
2010	The Penthouse	Tyler	Also writer and producer
2011	All Things Fall Apart	Paramedic Adam	
2011	Cross	—N/a	Executive producer
2011	The Legend of Awesomest Maximus	—N/a	Executive producer
2011	Machine Gun Preacher	American Businessman	
2012	The Obama Effect	—N/a	Executive producer
2012	Hello Herman	—N/a	Executive producer
2012	Fire with Fire	—N/a	Executive producer
2013	Welcome to the Jungle	—N/a	Executive producer
2013	Some Velvet Morning	—N/a	Associate producer
2014	Don Peyote	—N/a	Executive producer
2014	Kid Cannabis	Giovanni	Also producer
2014	Poker Night	Davis	Also producer
2018	The Ninth Passenger	Malcolm	Also writer, director, and producer
2018	In Like Flynn	Rex	Also writer and producer
2020	Breach	Lincoln	Also writer and producer
2021	Cosmic Sin	Dash	Also writer and producer
2021	Apex	Carrion	Also writer and producer
2021	American Siege	—N/a	Story writer and producer
2021	Deadlock	—N/a	Producer
2022	Gasoline Alley	—N/a	Producer
2022	Vendetta	—N/a	Producer
2022	Paradise City	Zyatt Dean	Also writer and producer
2022	Detective Knight: Rogue	Mercer	Also story writer and producer
2022	Detective Knight: Redemption	Mercer	Also story writer and producer
2023	Detective Knight: Independence	Mercer	Also story writer and producer
2023	One Ranger	—N/a	Producer
2023	Mob Land	—N/a	Producer
TBA	The Razor's Edge	—N/a	Producer

=== Television ===
Year	Title	Role	Notes
1997	Breaker High	San Diego Steve	Episode: "Kissin' Cousins"
1998	The Net	Nathan	Episode: "Harvest"
1999	So Weird	Albert	Episode: "Simplicity"
1999	Harsh Realm	Zach	Episode: "Leviathan"
2000	Freedom	Soldier McCammond	Episode: "War"
2001	Great Performances	Host	Episode: "Little Women"
2002	Providence	Jimmy	Episode: "Act Naturally"
2002	Beyond Belief: Fact or Fiction	Steve Malone	Segment: "Witness to Murder"
2003	Sabrina the Teenage Witch	Enrique	Episode: "Romance Looming"
2007	Fusion	—N/a	Television special; producer
