= Chasing Ghosts (2005 film) =

- Directed by: Kyle Dean Jackson
- Written by: Corey Large; Alan Pao
- Produced by: Brian Hartman; Ari Palitz; Alan Pao
- Starring: Michael Madsen; Shannyn Sossamon; Gary Busey; Meat Loaf; Michael Rooker
- Cinematography: Andrew Huebscher
- Edited by: Kyle Dean Jackson
- Music by: Scott Glasgow
- Distributed by: Wingman Productions; Sony Pictures Home Entertainment
- Release date: September 30, 2005 (Mexico)
- Running time: 119 minutes
- Country: United States
- Language: English
- Budget: $2 million
- Box office: $1,102,000

Chasing Ghosts is a 2005 mystery film directed by Kyle Dean Jackson, and starring Michael Madsen, Shannyn Sossamon, Gary Busey, Meat Loaf and Michael Rooker.

== Plot ==
NYPD Detective Kevin Harrison, a cop who used to be on the take from mobster Marcos Alfiri, has since turned good. Harrison is close to retirement when the son of a big-time gangster is killed; and no evidence is left behind. Together with his partner Cole, Harrison goes deep into the New York mob world, focused on finding his killer.

== Cast ==
- Michael Madsen as Kevin Harrison
- Corey Large as Cole Davies / Keris Alfiri
- Shannyn Sossamon as Taylor Spencer
- Meat Loaf as Richard Valbruno (credited as Michael Meat Loaf Aday)
- Gary Busey as Marcos Alfiri
- Lochlyn Munro as John Turbino
- Michael Rooker as Mark Spencer
- Danny Trejo as Carlos Santiago
- James Duval as Dmitri Parramatti
- Jeffrey Dean Morgan as Detective Cole Davies
- Mark Rolston as Frank Anderson
- Patrick Kilpatrick as Neil
