= Detective Knight: Redemption =

2022 American Christmas action film by Edward John Drake

- Official release poster
- Directed by: Edward John Drake
- Screenplay by: Edward John Drake
- Story by: Edward John Drake; Corey Large
- Produced by: Randall Emmett; George Furla; Corey Large
- Starring: Paul Johansson; Bruce Willis
- Cinematography: Laffrey Witbrod
- Edited by: Justin Williams
- Music by: Scott Currie
- Production companies: Emmett/Furla Oasis; Buffalo 8 Productions
- Distributed by: Lionsgate
- Release date: December 9, 2022
- Running time: 93 minutes
- Country: United States
- Language: English
- Box office: $192,939

Detective Knight: Redemption (also known as simply Christmas Knight) is a 2022 American Christmas action film directed by Edward John Drake, from a screenplay by Drake and Corey Large, and produced by Large, Randall Emmett, and George Furla. Serving as the second installment of the Detective Knight film series, and as a sequel to Detective Knight: Rogue (2022), it stars Paul Johansson and Bruce Willis.

Detective Knight: Redemption was released by Lionsgate in limited theaters and VOD on December 9, 2022, followed by its release on DVD and Blu-ray on January 17, 2023.

== Premise ==
After the events of Rogue, Detective James Knight is in prison for the murders of Winna and Brigga. During the Christmas season, Knight gets caught up in the middle of a jailbreak, led by a violent fanatic named Ricky Conlan, "The Christmas Bomber", and his crew, the "Real Saints of Christmas". He strikes a deal to take out the terrorists in exchange for his reinstatement. With the bomber's henchmen terrorizing the city, Knight must seek justice.

== Cast ==
- Bruce Willis as James Knight
- Lochlyn Munro as Eric Fitzgerald
- Corey Large as Mercer
- Paul Johansson as Ricky Conlan
- John Cassini as Mayor Vassetti
- Cody Kearsley as Dajon
- Beau Mirchoff as Rhodes
- Miranda Edwards as Anna Shea
- Michael Eklund as Winna
- Jimmy Jean-Louis as Godwin Sango
- Hunter Daily as Lily
- Alice Comer as Clara

== Production ==
In October 2021, Bruce Willis signed on to star in an action film under the working title Christmas Knight, from writer-director Edward John Drake, for a back-to-back production with Devil's Knight in Vancouver, Canada, from November 17 to December 14, 2021. Filming had wrapped by January 9, 2022, while Trevor Gretzky was confirmed to have reprised his role for both films. By September 2022, Christmas Knight was retitled to Detective Knight: Redemption, and set a December 9, 2022 release date. By November 2022, Lochlyn Munro, Corey Large, Miranda Edwards, and Beau Mirchoff, were set to reprise their roles from the first film, while John Cassini, Jerry Yu, and Paul Johansson were added to the cast. Detective Knight: Independence is one of the last films to star Willis, who retired from acting because he was diagnosed with frontotemporal dementia.

== Release ==
Detective Knight: Redemption was released by Lionsgate in limited theaters and VOD on December 9, 2022, followed by its release on DVD and Blu-ray on January 17, 2023.

=== Box office ===
As of January 15, 2023, Detective Knight: Redemption grossed $192,939 in South Africa and the United Arab Emirates.

=== Critical reception ===
On the review aggregator website Rotten Tomatoes, 67% of six critics' reviews are positive.

Roger Moore, of Movie Nation, gave the film a 1.5/4 rating, summarizing that "one just hopes the once and future John McClane was well-compensated, and that his retirement is as comfortable as he's earned, even if this is nobody's idea of "Redemption"". Brian Orndorf, of Blu-ray.com, gave the film a "D", writing the film was "just as dull and pointless as Rogue, adding another chapter to a shapeless, directionless saga jammed through the production process to take advantage of Willis's diminishing marquee value". Jeffrey Anderson, of Common Sense Media, gave the film a 2/5 rating, saying "the second movie in Willis' farewell action trilogy features even less of its star player this time, and while the tricks and cheats used to film around him sometimes work, they too often don't".

In a positive review, Film Threat writer Jason Delgado gave the film a 6/10 rating, summarizing that "Willis is the action hero in Detective Knight: Redemption, which should be reason enough for his fans to see it". Evan Dossey, of Midwest Film Journal, also gave the film a positive review, saying the film is "a suitably entertaining crime caper, as long as you know what to expect going in."
