= Malcolm Stewart (actor) =

Canadian actor

- Born: May 15, 1948 (age 78); Montreal, Quebec, Canada
- Occupation: Actor
- Years active: 1984–present
- Height: 1.88 m (6 ft 2 in)

Malcolm Stewart (born May 15, 1948) is a Canadian film actor. Stewart graduated from the University of Vermont and later attended Columbia University Graduate School in New York. He made his Broadway debut in Dracula with Frank Langella, and has since appeared in Broadway shows including Bedroom Farce and Torch Song Trilogy. He is also a licensed pilot.

== Selected filmography ==
Film
Year	Title	Role	Notes
2009	Moon	Technician	
2009	Grace	Dr. Richard Sohn	
2008	Dr. Dolittle: Tail to the Chief	Chief Dorian	
2008	Thomas Kinkade's Home for Christmas	Lloyd	
2004	Miracle	Donald Craig	
1995	Jumanji	James Shepherd	

TV
Year	Title	Role	Notes
2018–2021	Chesapeake Shores	Dennis Peck	8 episodes
2017	Christmas In Evergreen	Joe	Hallmark TV Film
2017	A Series of Unfortunate Events	Mr. Remora	Guest, 3 episodes
2017	My Favorite Wedding	Henry Tilton	Hallmark TV Film
2011	Christmas Comes Home to Canaan	Dr. Hanson	
2006	Fallen	Dr. Michael Jonas	
2006–2008	Kyle XY	Bradford Hooper	7 episodes
2002	Tom Stone	Clarence Croisette	
2002	Taken	Dr. Peter Quarrington	
2001	Night Visions	Officer Murphy	
1999	Fatal Error	Jack Doulan	TV movie
1999	Alien Radio		
1998	Beauty	Father McClellan	TV movie
1996	Stand Against Fear	Superintendent Emerson	TV movie
1996	The X-Files	Dr. Sacks, Agent Boonecaze	3 episodes
1996	Titanic	First Officer William Murdoch	TV miniseries
1996	Sliders	Regent Douglas Hagen	
1995	Ebbie or Miracle at Christmas: Ebbie's Story	Patterson	
1994	Someone Else's Child		
1994	The X-Files	Commander Carver	"3"
1993	The X-Files	Dr. Glass	"Pilot"
1992	Dead Ahead: The Exxon Valdez Disaster		TV movie
1990	Bordertown	Henry Jordan	TV serie, 4 episodes
1989	"The Veldt" in The Ray Bradbury Theater		Episode #29 (Season 3, Episode 11)
1988	Rendezvous in a Dark Place (The Twilight Zone)		
1988	Breaking All the Rules	Chris Haney	TV movie
