= Edward John Drake =

Australian music video director

- Born: Melbourne, Australia
- Occupation: Film director
- Website: Official website

Edward John Drake is an Australian screenwriter and film director based in Los Angeles, California.

== Film and other media ==
Drake's first production was Where Were You (2010), a short web series in the zombie genre which was made for just under $150. The series explores the ways in which a real-world pandemic would affect the modern world by looking at seven key intertwining stories at different stages of the infection. Where Were You was a finalist in the inaugural competition of Movie Network's Movie Extra WebFest.

Animals (2012), Drake's first feature film, began shooting in Newport on January 14, 2012, starring Sweeney Young, Melissa Howard, Jeremy Kewley, Reg Gorman and Scott Brennan.

Drake worked repeatedly with Bruce Willis: He wrote and directed the films Cosmic Sin, starring Bruce Willis, Frank Grillo, and Adelaide Kane, and Apex (2021), starring Neal McDonough and Bruce Willis. He wrote and executive produced Breach, starring Willis and Thomas Jane.

Of his non-Willis-work, he wrote and directed Broil, starring Jonathan Lipnicki, Lochlyn Munro, and Timothy V. Murphy. The film was selected for Fantaspoa 2020 and several other film festivals.

In 2025, Drake was expelled from the Writers Guild of America, because he (1) engaged in strikebreaking by making script changes on the film Guns Up during the 2023 writers strike and (2) refused to identify a non-member writer who wrote on the film and turn over the script he wrote in violation of the strike rules. Drake countered that DGA rules required him to do script changes as part of his directing duties, though the WGA countered that Drake is not a DGA member. The WGA also claimed he showed contempt for the disciplinary process, which Drake denied. The members of the WGA voted l to uphold the expulsion on appeal.

== Awards ==
Drake is the 2020 winner of the Austin Film Festival Screenwriting Award (Dramatic) for The Young Woman.

== Videography ==
2016

- Jack Ü – "Beats Knockin ft. Fly Boi Keno"
- Autoerotique – "Count On You"

2015

- Yolanda Be Cool ft. Sixto Rodriguez- "Sugar Man"
- We Are The Ocean – "Good For You"
- The Fratellis – "Impostors (Little By Little)"
- Matrix & Futurebound – "Happy Alone ft. V. Bozeman"

2014

- Investo & Tara McDonald – "A Place To Go"
- Klangkarussell – "All Eyes On You"
- Kito and Reija Lee – "Starting Line"

2013

- Stanton Warriors – "Cut Me Up"
- Kat Krazy – "Siren"
- Basto – "Dance With Me"

2012

- Van She – "Jamaica (Live)"

== Filmography ==
Short film

Year	Title	Director	Writer	Producer
2010	Where Were You	Yes	Yes	Yes
2012	Rain Hail Shine	Yes	No	No

Feature film

Year	Title	Director	Writer	Producer
2012	Animals	Yes	Yes	Yes
2020	Broil	Yes	Yes	No
2020	Breach	No	Yes	Executive
2021	Cosmic Sin	Yes	Yes	Executive
2021	Apex	Yes	Yes	No
2022	American Siege	Yes	Yes	No
2022	Gasoline Alley	Yes	Yes	No
2022	Detective Knight: Rogue	Yes	Yes	No
2022	Paradise City	No	Yes	No
2022	Detective Knight: Redemption	Yes	Yes	No
2023	Detective Knight: Independence	Yes	Yes	No
2025	Guns Up	Yes	Yes	No
