= Cody Kearsley =

Canadian actor

- Born: Kelowna, British Columbia, Canada
- Occupations: Actor, Director, Writer
- Years active: 2016–present
- Notable work: Riverdale; Daybreak

Cody Kearsley is a Canadian actor, best known for his portrayal of Moose Mason in the CW series Riverdale and Turbo Pokaski in the Netflix series Daybreak.

== Career ==
Kearsley debuted in a starring role in Borealis, where he was credited as the writer and actor. The film was released in 2016. He then, went on to play a minor role in the 2017 film Power Rangers. In the same year, Kearsley starred in a drama series Spiral, which lasted one season. He was later cast as Moose Mason in the Archie Comic-based CW television adaptation, Riverdale. He had a recurring role in the first three seasons before leaving mid-season in the third season. In 2018, Kearsley finished working on Gemini, a short sci-fi film. Recently, Kearsley starred as Turbo Bro Jock in the Netflix series Daybreak. Kearsley has also ventured into producing, producing upcoming film Kingdom Come and 2020 TV show Three Little Pieces.

== Filmography ==
=== Films ===
| Year | Title | Role | Notes |
|---|---|---|---|
| 2016 | Borealis | Nash | Also writer and producer |
| 2017 | Power Rangers | Hawkeye | |
| 2017 | Gemini | Chad | |
| 2020 | River Road | Travis | Post-production |
| 2020 | Breach | Noah | |
| 2022 | Detective Knight: Rogue | Dajon | |
| 2022 | Detective Knight: Redemption | Dajon | |
| 2026 | A Safe Distance | Matt | |
| 2026 | Send the Rain | Curtis | |
| TBA | Kingdom Come | | Pre-production; also producer |

=== Television ===
| Year | Title | Role | Notes |
|---|---|---|---|
| 2017 | Spiral | Josh | Main role |
| 2017–2023 | Riverdale | Marmaduke "Moose" Mason | Recurring role; 28 episodes |
| 2019 | iZombie | Gulliver | Episode: "Five, Six, Seven, Ate!" |
| 2019 | Daybreak | Turbo "Bro Jock" Pokaski | Main role |
| 2026 | Virgin River | Clay Crawford | Recurring role |
