= Apex (2021 film) =

2021 film by Edward John Drake

- Theatrical release poster
- Directed by: Edward John Drake
- Written by: Edward John Drake; Corey William Large
- Produced by: Corey William Large; Sean O'Reilly; Matthew Helderman; Luke Taylor
- Starring: Neal McDonough; Bruce Willis
- Cinematography: Wai Sun Cheng
- Edited by: Justin William
- Music by: Hugh Wielenga
- Production company: 308 Enterprises
- Distributed by: RLJE Films
- Release date: November 12, 2021
- Running time: 94 minutes
- Country: United States
- Language: English
- Box office: $11,984

Apex, titled Apex Predator in the UK, is a 2021 American science fiction action film directed by Edward John Drake and written by John Drake and Corey William Large. It stars Neal McDonough and Bruce Willis and was released on November 12, 2021.

== Plot ==
The film opens with Samuel, a self-proclaimed Apex Warrior and pharmaceutical trillionaire, shooting and killing a man. Samuel complains to a computer interface that he is becoming bored with the 'game' and asks the computer to find him a real challenge.

Thomas Malone has spent years of his life in prison, serving a life without parole sentence for multiple crimes he had committed in the past. He longs to be reunited with his family, with whom he has no contact. Thomas is approached by the game-master and offered the opportunity for his freedom. To win, Thomas must survive on a private island while being hunted by five wealthy participants, known as Hunters. Thomas accepts the offer, knowing it is his only chance to be reunited with his family and to gain his freedom.

As the hunt progresses, the hunters start to doubt each other and their own abilities, and begin to turn against one another. Samuel outwits all the other hunters in the game and claims their heads as trophies. He becomes frustrated that Thomas has escaped him so he hires additional hunters called 'Mongrels' to take part in the hunt and help him kill Thomas. Thomas eventually beats the Mongrels and faces-off with Samuel. Samuel taunts Thomas about his experience in prison, informs him that his head will look good in his trophy case, and tells Thomas to beg for his life. Thomas refuses. The confrontation ends in a fast-draw with Thomas firing a larger gun and ultimately killing Samuel. Thomas leaves the game and the island with his freedom.

== Cast ==
- Bruce Willis as Thomas Malone
- Neal McDonough as Samuel Rainsford
- Corey William Large as Carrion
- Lochlyn Munro as Lyle
- Trevor Gretzky as Ecka
- Nels Lennarson as Bishop
- Megan Peta Hill as Jeza
- Adam Huel Potter as Warden Nicholls
- Joe Munroe as Damien
- Alexia Fast as West Zaroff

== Production ==
The film was shot in Victoria, British Columbia. Filming wrapped in November 2020.

== Release ==
Apex was released by RLJE Films on November 12, 2021. The film was released in some regions as Apex Predator.

=== Box office ===
This film was not released in theaters in the United States. But as of November 11, 2022, Apex grossed $11,984 in the United Arab Emirates.

=== Critical reception ===
On the review aggregator website Rotten Tomatoes, 11% of 9 critics' reviews are positive, with an average rating of 2.7/10.

Leslie Felperin of The Guardian gave it 1 out of 5 and called it "a tedious genre exercise". Sara Michelle Fetters of MovieFreak.com gave it 1 out of 4 and wrote: "It's bad. Lets just leave it at that and call it a day."

A positive review came from Alan Ng of Film Threat who gave it 7 out of 10, saying it "has the right level of seriousness that keeps it from becoming camp and crazy enough to keep it from becoming too serious for its own good."

== Accolades ==
Bruce Willis was nominated for his performance in this movie, as he was for all movies he appeared in, in 2021, in the category Worst Performance by Bruce Willis in a 2021 Movie at the Golden Raspberry Awards. The category was later rescinded after he announced his retirement due to aphasia.

== See also ==
- The Most Dangerous Game, a short story by Richard Connell
- The Running Man (1987 film). An ex-cop (Arnold Schwarzenegger) is transferred to a game of death to fight for freedom and the entertainment of the audience.
- Hard Target (1993 film). An ex-soldier (Jean-Claude Van Damme) is the target in a trophy hunt for a rich client.
- Surviving the Game (1994 film) It is loosely based on the 1924 short story "The Most Dangerous Game" by Richard Connell. The film stars Ice-T, Rutger Hauer, Charles S. Dutton, John C. McGinley, William McNamara, Gary Busey, and F. Murray Abraham.
- The Hunt (2020 film). Rich people hunt deplorables.
