= Beau Mirchoff =

American and Canadian actor (born 1989)

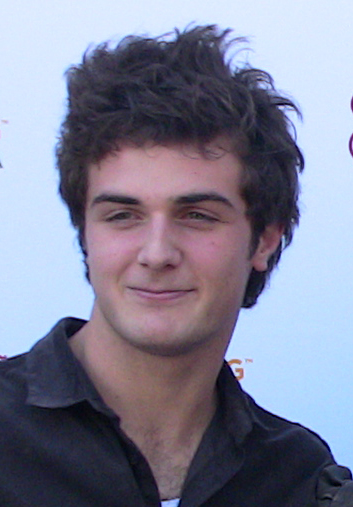
- Mirchoff in 2010
- Born: William Beau Mirchoff; January 13, 1989 (age 37); Seattle, Washington, U.S.
- Citizenship: United States; Canada
- Education: Oregon State University
- Occupation: Actor
- Years active: 2003–present

William Beau Mirchoff (/ˈmɜːrtʃɒf/; born January 13, 1989) is an American and Canadian actor. Mirchoff is best known for playing Matty McKibben in the MTV series Awkward, Jamie Hunter in Good Trouble, and Ford Halstead in the Starz series Now Apocalypse.

== Early life ==
Mirchoff was born in Seattle, Washington. Two days later, he moved to his family's home in Victoria, British Columbia.

== Career ==
Mirchoff first got noticed for his role in the play Bubbly Stiltskin. His first feature was a supporting role in Scary Movie 4, playing 'Robbie Ryan'. He was a recurring character on the CBC series Heartland. He also landed a lead role in The Grudge 3. Mirchoff joined the cast of Desperate Housewives, playing Danny Bolen between 2009 and 2010. He had supporting roles in the indie film The Secret Lives of Dorks and in the film I Am Number Four. Mirchoff starred as a lead in the MTV series Awkward. He played the role of Dominic in the Disney Channel film The Wizards Return: Alex vs. Alex. Beau was also seen as a recurring character on NBC's period drama Aquarius and in indie thriller Poker Night opposite Ron Perlman and Giancarlo Esposito. He is now known for playing the role of Jamie Hunter on The Fosters and now more recently their sister show, Good Trouble.

== Personal life ==
In August 2021, Mirchoff became engaged to psychologist Jenny Meinen. They have since ended their relationship.

In March 2024, Mirchoff graduated from Oregon State University with a Bachelor's degree in environmental sciences.

== Filmography ==
=== Film ===
Year	Title	Role	Notes
2006	Scary Movie 4	Robbie Ryan	
2007	In the Land of Women	Teenager	Uncredited
2009	The Grudge 3	Andy	
2011	I Am Number Four	Drew	
2013	The Secret Lives of Dorks	Clark	
2014	Born to Race: Fast Track	Jake Kendall	
2014	Poker Night	Jeter	
2015	Tell Tale Lies		
2015	See You in Valhalla	Johnny	
2017	Flatliners	Brad	
2017	All Summers End	Eric Turner	
2022	Detective Knight: Rogue	Casey Rhodes	
2022	Detective Knight: Redemption	Casey Rhodes	
2023	Unicorn Boy	Oak	Voice role

=== Television ===
Year	Title	Role	Notes
2003	Romeo!	Chase	Episode: "He Got Blame"
2007–2008	Heartland	Benjamine "Ben" Stillman	Recurring role; 6 episodes
2009	Stranger with My Face	Gordon Lambert	Television film
2009–2010	Desperate Housewives	Danny Bolen	Supporting role; 18 episodes
2011	CSI: Miami	Jared Hatch	Episode: "Paint It Black"
2011	The Protector	Tyler	Episode: "Beef"
2011–2016	Awkward	Matty McKibben	Main role Teen Choice Awards TV Breakout Star: Male
2012	CSI: Crime Scene Investigation	Jake Pychan	Episode: "Trends with Benefits"
2013	The Wizards Return: Alex vs. Alex	Dominic	Television film
2015	Aquarius	Rick Zondervan	Recurring role; 3 episodes
2015	The Murder Pact	Will Lasalle	Television film
2017	Party Boat	Jonathan	Television film
2018	I'm Dying Up Here	Saul Hudson	3 episodes
2018	The Fosters	Jamie Hunter	3 episodes
2019–2024	Good Trouble	Jamie Hunter	Recurring role (seasons 1-2); main role (seasons 3-4); guest role (season 5)
2019	Now Apocalypse	Ford Halstead	Main role
2021	Narcos: Mexico	Steve Sheridan	Recurring role; 4 episodes
2022	Hidden Gems	Jack	Hallmark Movie
2023	Ride	Cash McMurray	Main role
2024	The Finnish Line	Cole Olsen	Hallmark Movie
2025	Boots	Sgt. Maitra	2 episodes
2026	A Little Park Music	Ryan	Hallmark Movie
