= Lochlyn Munro =

Canadian actor (born 1966)

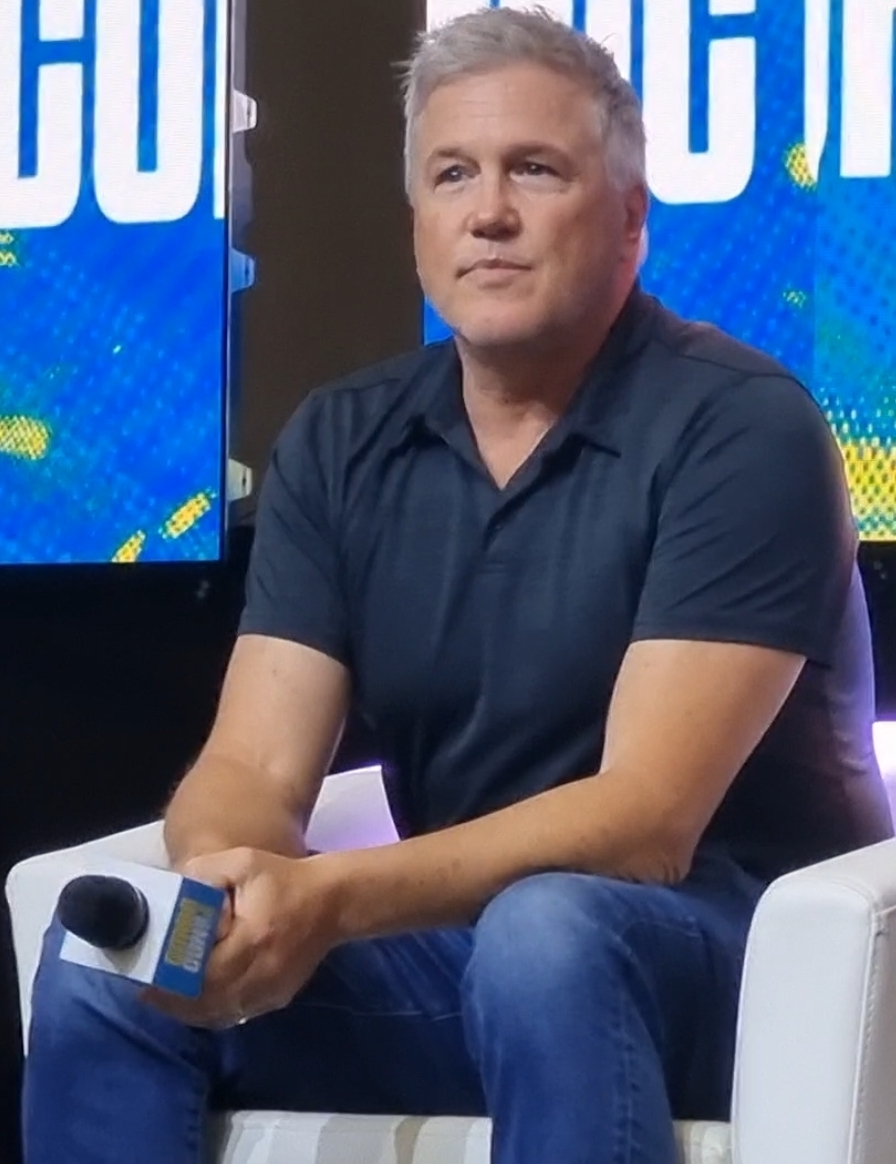
- Munro at the 2025 Panama Comic-Con
- Born: Richard Laughlin Munro; February 12, 1966 (age 60); Lac la Hache, British Columbia, Canada
- Occupation: Actor
- Years active: 1987–present
- Spouse: Sharon Munro (m. 1997)
- Children: 2

Lochlyn Munro (born Richard Laughlin Munro; February 12, 1966) is a Canadian actor. His most notable film roles include A Night at the Roxbury (1998), Scary Movie (2000), Freddy vs. Jason (2003), White Chicks (2004), The Predator (2018) and Cosmic Sin (2021). For television, he is perhaps best known for his roles in the Canadian series Northwood, supernatural drama Charmed, teen drama Riverdale, and the DC comics series Peacemaker (2022).

== Career ==
Munro's first films include starring roles in two Moment of Truth movies: Stand Against Fear, as a high-school jock who uses his popularity for all the wrong reasons, and Abduction of Innocence, as the boyfriend-turned-kidnapper of a teenage lumber heiress. In 1999, Munro played the recurring role of Jack Sheridan during the second season of Charmed. He has also appeared on Without a Trace, CSI: Crime Scene Investigation, CSI: Miami, and CSI: NY playing three different characters. He appeared as Peter Musevini, a time traveling patriarch of a genetically-enhanced Nietzschean race, in "Pride Before the Fall", the 100th episode of Andromeda.

He has collaborated multiple times with the Wayans family, starring in five of their films (Scary Movie (2000), White Chicks, Little Man, Dance Flick, and Scary Movie (2026)).

In 2017, Munro began playing the recurring role of Hal Cooper on The CW teen drama Riverdale.

In 2022, Munro played the recurring character Detective Larry Fitzgibbon on the DC comics series Peacemaker.

== Personal life ==
Munro splits his time between Vancouver and Los Angeles.

== Filmography ==
=== Film ===
Year	Film	Role	Notes
1990	Sylvan Lake Summer	Mitch	
1990	Cadence	Bartender	
1991	Run	College Buddy	
1992	Unforgiven	Texas Slim	
1993	Digger	Mark	
1993	Needful Things	John LaPointe	
1993	Anything for Love	Jon	
1994	Wagons East	Billy	
1994	Trancers 4: Jack of Swords	Sebastian	
1996	Downhill Willie	Spider Bolton	
1997	High Voltage	Larry	
1998	2 Extra Days	Man #2	
1998	Dead Man on Campus	Cliff O'Malley	
1998	A Night at the Roxbury	Craig	
1998	A Murder of Crows	Norwood	
2000	Spin Cycle	Tom	
2000	Screwed	Officer Richardsen	
2000	Scary Movie	Greg Phillippe	
2000	Duets	Ronny Jackson	
2000	Dracula 2000	Eddie	
2001	Camouflage	Marty Mackenzie	
2001	Knight Club	Gary Grieco	
2001	Kill Me Later	Agent Reed	
2001	Kevin of the North	Ned Parker	
2002	Pressure	Patrick Fisher	
2002	Global Heresy	Dave	
2002	Heart of America	Reporter	
2003	A Guy Thing	Ray Donovan	
2003	Net Games	Inmate	
2003	Freddy vs. Jason	Deputy Scott Stubbs	
2004	The Wild Guys	Randall	
2004	White Chicks	Agent Jake Harper	
2004	The Keeper	Sgt. Burns	
2005	Dirty Love	Kevin	
2005	Chasing Ghosts	John Turbino	
2005	Complete Guide to Guys	Roger	
2006	Behind the Smile	Greg Elese	
2006	The Benchwarmers	Ultimate Home Remodel Host	
2006	Little Man	Greg	
2006	The Tooth Fairy	Peter Campbell	
2006	Deck the Halls	Ted	Uncredited
2006	Final Move	Det. Roman Krieg	
2007	Daddy Day Camp	Lance Warner	
2007	Hack!	Deputy Radley	Uncredited
2008	Loaded	Clive	
2008	Toxic	R.M.	
2008	This Is Not a Test	Clerk	
2008	The Art of War II: Betrayal	Garret	
2009	3 of Us	John	
2009	Space Buddies	Slats Bentley	
2009	Dance Flick	Coach Effron	Uncredited
2009	Penance	Jack	
2009	Nowhere to Hide	Det. Jack Irons	
2009	Lies & Illusions	Andrew Laughlin	
2010	The Penthouse	Barry	
2010	Infection: The Invasion Begins	Sheriff Bowen	
2010	Let the Game Begin	Gary Johnson	
2010	Hard Breakers	Jared	
2010	Christmas Mail	Mr. Fuller	
2011	In the Name of the King 2: Two Worlds	The King/Raven	
2011	Recoil	Agent Frank Sutton	
2012	Jules Verne's Mysterious Island	Captain Cyrus Harding	
2012	Dawn Rider	Rudd Gordon	
2012	Fatal Call	Det. Zyler	
2012	The Company You Keep	FBI Agent Munro	
2013	The Package	Eddie	
2013	Hansel & Gretel Get Baked	Officer Ritter	
2013	Assault on Wall Street	Robert Canworth	
2014	Kid Cannabis	Taser	
2014	The Age of Reason	Frank	
2014	Rampage: Capital Punishment	Chip Parker	
2014	Run for Your Life	Neal	
2014	Driven Underground	Det. Boyce	
2015	12 Rounds 3: Lockdown	Darrow Smith	
2015	Death Valley	Billy Rich	
2015	Tomorrowland	Tony Newton	Scenes deleted
2015	Badge of Honor	David Miles	
2015	The Unspoken	Dad	
2015	Rosemont	Craig	
2016	Blackway	Murdoch	
2017	Max 2: White House Hero	President Bennett	
2018	The Predator	Lieutenant General Marks	
2018	In Like Flynn	Ronald	
2018	A Stone Cold Christmas	Max	
2019	Benchwarmers 2: Breaking Balls	Stenhouse	
2019	Chokehold	Jones	Video
2019	Spiral	Marshal	
2020	The Sinners	Detective O'Ryan	
2020	Sniper: Assassin's End	Agent John Franklin	Direct-to-video
2020	Initiation	Bruce Van Horn	
2020	Broil	Freddie Oaks	
2020	Dead Voices	Paul	
2021	Love Hard	Rex	
2021	Cosmic Sin	Alex Locke	
2021	Apex	Lyle	
2022	Until Branches Bend		
2022	When Time Got Louder	Mark	
2022	Detective Knight: Rogue	Eric Fitzgerald	
2022	Detective Knight: Redemption	Eric Fitzgerald	
2023	Detective Knight: Independence	Eric Fitzgerald	
2023	Marc Ecko's Getting Up: Legends of New Radius		Short
2023	Totally Killer	Adult Blake Hughes	
2024	All the Lost Ones	Hank	
2025	Where the Wind Blows	Frank Lloyd	
2026	Vampires of the Velvet Lounge	Malcolm	
2026	Scary Movie	Greg Philippe	
2026	And Love Knocked	Bill	Also producer

=== Television ===
Year	Title	Role	Notes
1987–1990	21 Jump Street	Various roles	Recurring role
1989	Danger Bay	David Fulman	Episode: "A Question of Attitude"
1990	Neon Rider	Slack	Episode: "Over the Line"
1990	Wiseguy	Bobby	2 episodes
1991	The Girl from Mars	Earl West	Television film
1991	Posing: Inspired by Three Real Stories	Sam	Television film
1991–1994	Northwood	Jason	44 episodes
1992	Nightmare Cafe	Ralston	Episode: "The Heart of the Mystery"
1992	Shame	Dave Rainey	Television film
1992	Dead Ahead: The Exxon Valdez Disaster	Trooper Mike Fox	Television film
1993	A Stranger in the Mirror	Alan Preston	Television film
1994	Blossom	Evan Henderson	Episode: "Meat"
1994	Highlander: The Series	Tim	Episode: "Under Colour of Authority"
1994	Cobra	Clifton Campbell	Episode: "A Few Dead Men"
1994	Hawkeye	McKinney	14 episodes
1994	Broken Pledges	Jeff Lanee	Television film
1995	Strange Luck	Dirk Moody	Episode: "She Was"
1995, 2002	The Outer Limits	Captain Eric Woodward	2 episodes
1996	Sliders	Billy the Kid	Episode: "The Good, the Bad and the Wealthy"
1996	Justice for Annie: A Moment of Truth Movie	Mickey Holloway	Television film
1996	Viper	Second Hitman	Episode: "Standoff"
1996	When Friendship Kills	Nick McKay	Television film
1996	Mother, May I Sleep with Danger?	Kevin Shane	Television film
1996	Abduction of Innocence	Eddie Spencer	Television film
1996	Stand Against Fear	Josh Kelly	Television film
1996–1997	Two	Agent Andrew Forbes	9 episodes
1997	Honey, I Shrunk the Kids: The TV Show	Paul O'Donnell	Episode: "Honey, We're Stuck in the 70's"
1998	Dead Man's Gun	Joe Cavanaugh	Episode: "Wages of Sin"
1998	Poltergeist: The Legacy	Todd Barnard	Episode: "The Light"
1998	Welcome to Paradox	Young Doctor	Episode: "Alien Jane"
1998	A Champion's Fight	Steve	Television film
1998	I Know What You Did	Justin Decker	Television film
1998	Silencing Mary	Billy	Television film
1998	One Hot Summer Night	Detective Eddie Beltran	Television film
1999	Partners	Stephen	Episode: "Never Says Never Again"
1999	JAG	Lt. 'X-Man' Buxton	2 episodes
1999	Our Guys: Outrage at Glen Ridge	Officer Balke	Television film
1999–2000	Charmed	Jack Sheridan	Recurring role
2000	Blacktop	David	Television film
2002	The Investigation	Darryll Kettles	Television film
2003	The Dead Zone	Jason Moore	Episode: "Playing God"
2003	Jake 2.0	Lawrence	Episode: "Whiskey – Tango – Foxtrot"
2003	CSI: Crime Scene Investigation	Officer Hal Watson	Episode: "Invisible Evidence"
2003	Lucky 7	Ray	Television film
2004	Monk	Fat Tony Lucarelli	Episode: "Mr. Monk Meets the Godfather"
2004	Dead Like Me	Greg	Episode: "Ghost Story"
2005	Andromeda	Peter / Drago Museveni	Episode: "Pride Before the Fall"
2005	Las Vegas	Kevin 'Jinx' Jergeson	Episode: "Can You See What I See"
2005	CSI: Miami	Rick Adams	Episode: "Nothing to Lose"
2005	Without a Trace	Lance Hamilton	Episode: "Lone Star"
2005	NCIS	Kevin Holt	Episode: "Bikini Wax"
2005	Weeds	Bike Cop	Episode: "Lude Awakening"
2005	CSI: NY	Ethan Fallon	Episode: "Bad Beat"
2005–2007	Eyes	Eric Paulsen	2 episodes
2006	Smallville	Orlando Block	Episode: "Sneeze"
2006	Thugaboo: A Miracle on D-Roc's Street	Gavin's Dad	Television film
2007	The Perfect Child	Paul Jacobs	Television film
2008	Riddles of the Sphinx	Robert Parr	Television film
2010	The Mentalist	Keith Farrow	Episode: "Red Sky at Night"
2010	Xtinction: Predator X	Sheriff Tim Richards	Television film
2011	Castle	Kevin McCann	2 episodes
2011	Past Obsessions	Thomas Brisano	Television film
2011	Gone	David	Television film
2012	Psych	Steve Rollins	Episode: "Shawn and the Real Girl"
2012	True Justice	Mark Simms	12 episodes
2012	Transporter: The Series	Agent Smith	Episode: "Dead Drop"
2012	Hawaii Five-0	Jim Rogers	Episode: "Ha'awe Make Loa"
2012	Burn Notice	Dr. Jed	Episode: "Game Change"
2013	King & Maxwell	Jack Turner	2 episodes
2013	Longmire	Grant Thayer	2 episodes
2013	Cedar Cove	Zach Weston	Episode: "For the Sake of the Children"
2013	Cracked	Jonas Boyar	Episode: "The Price"
2013	Lost Girl	Ian	Episode: "Lovers. Apart."
2013	Mr. Hockey: The Gordie Howe Story	Bobby Hull	Television film
2013	Out of Reach	Matthew	Television film
2014	Arrow	Captain Stein	Episode: "Birds of Prey"
2014	Motive	Gary Oliver	Episode: "Kiss of Death"
2014	Merry Ex-Mas	Flynn	Television film
2015	Scorpion	Detective Jim Archer	Episode: "Risky Business"
2015	When Sparks Fly	Phil	Television film
2015	The Christmas Note	Robert	Television film
2016	Supernatural	Ben	Episode: "Mamma Mia"
2016	Rizzoli & Isles	Skeet Martin	Episode: "Bassholes"
2016	Beauty and the Beast	Hank Keller	Episode: "Chasing Ghosts"
2016	Ties That Bind	McGee	Episode: "Protect and Serve"
2016	Awkward	Ted	2 episodes
2016	Bones	Sal Raymound	Episode: "High Treason in the Holiday Season"
2016	Chicago Med	Jack Cooper	Episode: "Clarity"
2016	Lucifer	Anthony Paolucci	3 episodes
2016	When Calls the Heart	James Addison	2 episodes
2016	Cradle of Lies	Cal Ward	Television film
2016	All Yours	Henry	Television film
2016	The Game of Love	Jake Cornell	Television film
2016	A Snow Capped Christmas	Lou	Television film
2016	The Mistletoe Promise	Dan	Television film
2017	Major Crimes	Lt. Capra	2 episodes
2017	Haters Back Off	Brian Maxwell	Episode: "broadway or buts"
2017	Mechanics of Love	Doc Dupree	Television film
2017–2019; 2021–2023	Riverdale	Hal Cooper	Recurring role; 51 episodes
2018	The Detectives	Det. Bill Clark	Episode: "Trick or Treat"
2018	The Case That Haunts Me	Investigator Bill Clark	Episode: "Trick or Treat"
2018	The 5th Quarter	Gary Glazman	Episode: "The Oh-No No-No"
2018	Beyond	Ken Sheldrake	4 episodes
2018	Take Two	Mitch Rhodes	Episode: "One to the Heart"
2018	A Million Little Things	Coach	Episode: "Save the Date"
2018	Winter's Dream	Ski Dad	Television film
2018	Garage Sale Mystery: Pandora's Box	Joel Jacobs	Television film
2019	The Murders	Det. Michael Huntley	Episode: "The Long Black Veil"
2019	SEAL Team	Mike Zell	2 episodes
2019	Mystery 101: Dead Talk	Detective Denny Roma	Television film
2020	The Good Doctor	Martin Cross	2 episodes
2021	Heartland	Clyde McGregor	Episode: "Find Me in the Dark"
2021	Joe Pickett	Governor Budd	Episode: "Open Season"
2021	Crossword Mysteries: Terminal Descent	Morgan Daniels	Television film
2021	Chronicle Mysteries: Helped to Death	Billy Garrett	Television film
2021	Time For Them To Come Home for Christmas	Sheriff Crowley	Television film
2022–2025	Peacemaker	Larry Fitzgibbon	Recurring role; 9 episodes
2023	Creepshow	Jeff	Episode: "Cheat Code"
2023	Navigating Christmas	Ray Schultz	Television film
2023	Reacher	Chief Wright	Episode: "What Happens in Atlantic City"
2024	Fire Country	Main Protester	Episode: "A Hail Mary"
2025	Hudson & Rex	Arnold Crane	Episode: "A Room with a View"
2025	Wild Cards	Walter	Episode: "Bride and Doom"
2025	Family Law	Andrew Jennings	Episode: "Autonomy"
2025	The Chicken Sisters	Mayor Carson Merinac	Recurring role; 4 episodes
