= Francis Cronin =

Irish actor and comedian

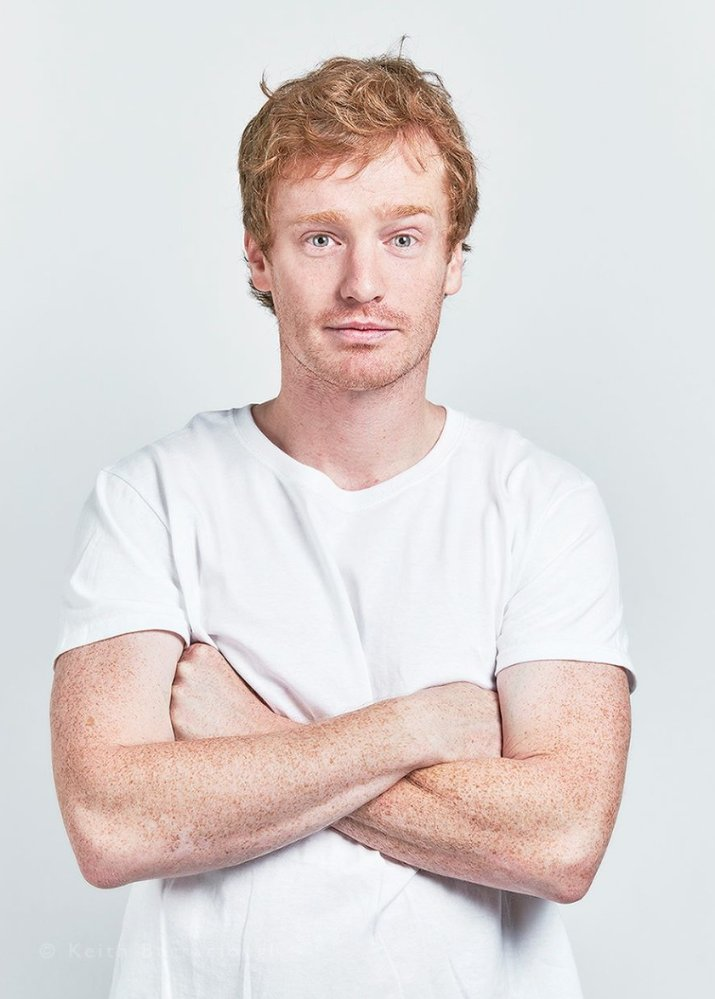
- Born: Francis John Cronin; Dublin, Ireland
- Education: Templeogue College
- Occupation: Actor
- Website: www.franciscronin.com

Francis Cronin is an Irish actor and comedian and recipient of a Presidential Commission in 2007.

== Early life and education ==
Francis was born and raised in Dublin, Ireland, where he attended Templeogue College Secondary School. After leaving Templeogue college he started to study a BA in Arts and later joined the Irish Aircorps.

== Career ==
In 2005 Francis served with the United Nations on the UNMIL peace enforcing mission in Liberia and on his return began an Irish Army cadetship as part of the 82nd Cadet class and received a presidential commission in 2007 'Winning the tactical sword for leadership'. He retired a lieutenant in 2008.

While serving in the Irish Defense Forces he began a Bachelor of Arts degree in Psychological studies and Spanish at the National University of Ireland, Galway. In 2008 he opened an Irish bar 'The Temple Bar' in Guadalajara, Mexico. Francis achieved national acclaim for his video series documenting his adventures on his YouTube channel Glowpunk.

After living his entire final year of university in a tent, Francis performed a one-man show Tent Boy in which "he distilled his experiences of living in the tent down to a performance" in the Galway, Muscailt Arts Festival in 2013 at the Bank of Ireland Theatre, Galway. While living in the tent in his six part series documenting his adventures he interviewed Irish comedian Des Bishop and Owen Colgan of the Hardy Bucks. He is currently studying acting at the Stella Adler Academy of Acting in Hollywood, Los Angeles. He began performing standup comedy in 2013 and has since performed with Emmy Award winning Saturday Night Live alumnus Dana Carvey and Christopher Titus of pawnography fame. Francis has also starred in 'The Funster' YouTube series by Carvey, where he portrays a hopeful tech entrepreneur. He is currently working on and guest starring in Beyondthecomics.com with ex-SNL head writer and screenwriter Fred Wolf.

Francis was a series regular on Equals Three productions Date Debate and Comedians On And a series regular in Ray William Johnson's viral video sketches which receive over 50 million views a month. Francis has played the lead in the theatrical productions Nick Dear's Frankenstein in which he played The Creature. The Jacksonian by Beth Henley in which he played Dr. Bill Perch. 12 Angry Men in which he played Juror number 5. Dramatis Personae, where he played John Rose. He also performed alongside Meena Suvari at the Los Angeles Greek Film Festival.

== Filmography ==
=== TV series ===
Year	Title	Role
2012	Happy Camper	GlowPunk
2013	The Boys	Jimmy John Joe
2013	The Funster	
2014	Beyond the Comics	Self
2015	Comedians On	Self
2016	Date Debate	Self

=== Films ===
Year	Title	Role
2015	A Friend in Need	Vincent
2016	Dilemma	Tony
2016	Dr. Elevator	Jacob Jefferson (J.J)
2016	Frenchman's Flat	Murphy
2016	And We Are Live	Frankie
2023	Detective Knight: Independence	Peter O'Malley
2025	Guns Up	Danny Clogan

=== Theatre ===
- Frankenstein by playwright Nick Dear. Played the lead role of The Creature.
- The Jacksonian by Pulitzer Prize winning playwright Beth Henley. Played the lead Dr. Bill Perch.
- 12 Angry Men by playwright Reginald Rose. Played Juror Number 5.
- Dramatis Personae by playwright Don Nigro. Playing John Rose.

== Accolades ==
Francis was nominated for "Outsider person of the year 2013" and won the Waff (Wee Adventure Film Festive) "People's choice Award 2012" for his other comedic adventure videos on his YouTube channel glowpunk. Francis also received an "Honorary head case award" from headcase.ie.
