= Paradise City (film) =

2022 American film by Chuck Russell

- Official release poster
- Directed by: Chuck Russell
- Written by: Chuck Russell; Corey Large; Edward John Drake
- Produced by: Corey Large
- Starring: Bruce Willis; John Travolta
- Cinematography: Austin F. Schmidt
- Edited by: Peter Devaney Flanagan
- Music by: Sam Ewing
- Production company: 308 Entertainment
- Distributed by: Saban Films
- Release date: November 11, 2022
- Running time: 94 minutes
- Country: United States
- Language: English
- Box office: $93,526

Paradise City is a 2022 American action film directed by Chuck Russell and written by Russell, Corey Large, and Edward John Drake. It stars Bruce Willis and John Travolta.

The film was released by Saban Films in limited theaters and VOD on November 11, 2022, followed by its release on DVD and Blu-ray on December 20, 2022.

== Plot ==
When bounty hunter Ian Swan is shot and presumed dead after disappearing in Maui waters, Swan's son Ryan, his ex-partner, and a local detective set out to find his killers. After being threatened by a ruthless power broker, it appears Ryan and his team are out of options — until an excursion to the closely guarded island community of Paradise City unites them with an unforeseen ally.

== Cast ==
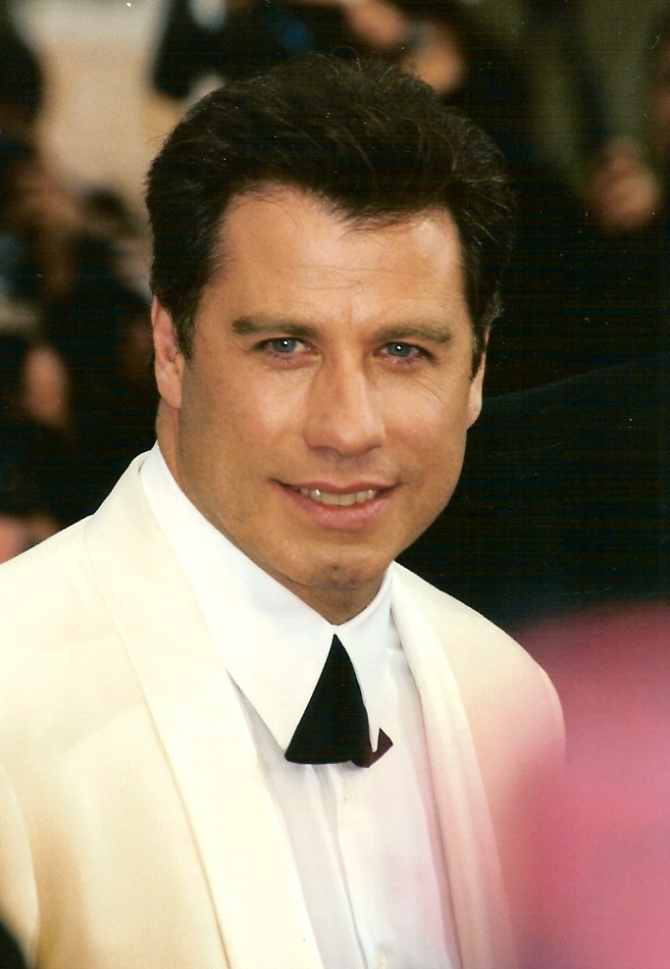
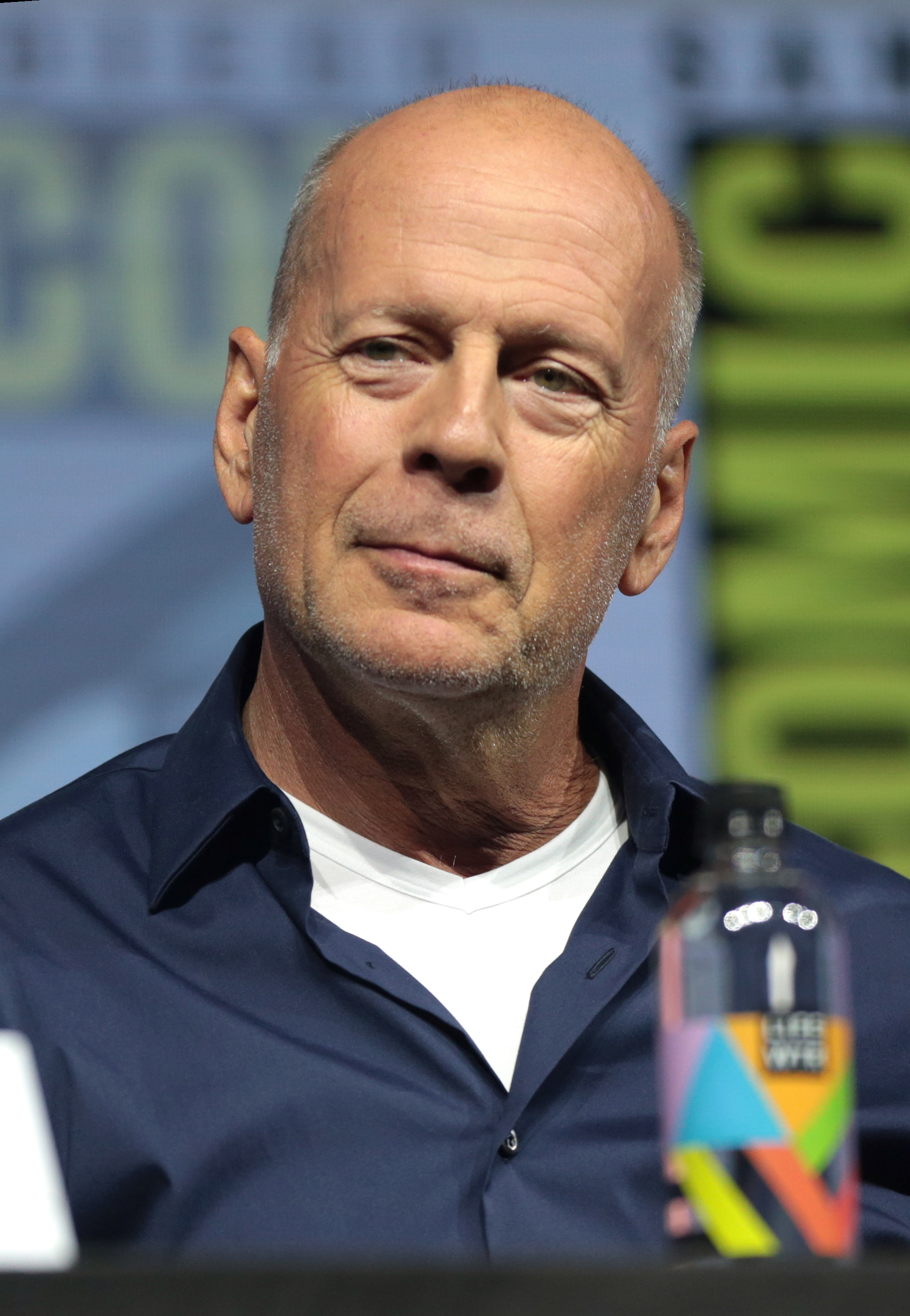
Paradise City stars John Travolta and Bruce Willis.
- Bruce Willis as Ian Swan
- John Travolta as Arlene Buckley
- Stephen Dorff as Robbie Cole
- Blake Jenner as Ryan Swan
- Praya Lundberg as Savannah
- Corey Large as Zyatt Dean
- Branscombe Richmond as Senator Kane
- Laird Akeo as Koa Kahale
- Lorenzo Antonucci as Scorpion
- Kate Katzman as Nikki
- Amber Abara as Gerry
- Carrie Anne Bernans as Kai

== Production ==
In 2006, co-writer and producer Corey Large came up with the idea to reunite actors Bruce Willis and John Travolta, who both starred in Pulp Fiction (1994). Paradise City was announced twenty-seven years later in May 2021. Filming began on May 17, 2021, in Maui, Hawaii, and wrapped after three weeks. Maui County Film Commissioner Tracy Bennett said, "Usually on a big action movie like [Paradise City], it takes about three months of prep — and they did it in two weeks. There were some restrictions on this one because of the short notice where they could not film exactly where they wanted to or what they wanted to so they were constantly re-writing the script." Stephen Dorff and Blake Jenner were announced to star in June. Paradise City is one of the last films to star Willis, who retired from acting because he was diagnosed with frontotemporal dementia.

== Release ==
Paradise City was released by Saban Films in limited theaters and VOD on November 11, 2022, followed by its release on DVD and Blu-ray on December 20, 2022.

=== Box office ===
As of March 2, 2023, Paradise City grossed $93,526 in Russia, Lithuania, and the United Arab Emirates.

=== Critical reception ===
On the review aggregator website Rotten Tomatoes, 14% of 14 critics' reviews are positive, with an average rating of 3.4/10. Metacritic, which uses a weighted average, assigned the film a score of 31 out of 100, based on 5 critics, indicating "generally unfavorable" reviews.

Glenn Kenny, of The New York Times, gave a scathing review, saying it "sounds like one of those fake movies joked about on Seinfeld or 30 Rock. And yet Paradise City is a reality of sorts, albeit an uncomfortable reality." Noel Murray, of the Los Angeles Times, gave the film a negative review, commenting on the film's "TV-cop-show-level stuff, shot in some of Hawaii's least scenic locations. The stars can't save it." Todd Jorgenson, of Cinemalogue, also gave a negative review, highlighting that "despite its capable cast, the film never generates much suspense amid a parade of cliched genre twists." Robert Kojder, of Flickering Myth, gave the film a 1.5/5 rating, writing "audiences will be begging, "oh, won't you please take me home."" Casey Chong, of Casey's Movie Mania, gave a 1/5 rating, summarizing the film as "painful, tedious and worst of all, relies heavily on expository-heavy scenarios to drive the movie forward." Leo Brady, of A Movie Guy, also gave a one star rating, explaining that the film "has a capable cast working with a script that was concocted overnight. At best it feels like a free paid trip to Hawaii for everyone involved." Brian Orndorf, of Blu-ray.com, rated the film 2 out of 5 stars, saying "the stars are here to enjoy a Hawaiian vacation and trade a few lines of dialogue. Screen intensity is not encouraged." Jeffrey M. Anderson, of Common Sense Media, also gave a 2 star rating, concluding that "beautiful Hawaiian locations, a veteran genre director, and nostalgic stunt casting can't overcome the general low energy level and lazy attitude that permeate this crime drama from start to finish."

In a rare positive review, Owen Gleiberman of Variety wrote, "I'm not sure if what Willis, Travolta, and Dorff do here rises to what you'd call integrity, but all three seem to be enjoying themselves. They slum with style." Brittany Witherspoon, of Screen Rant, wrote in a mixed review, "the film contains entertaining components, but these elements quickly run their course thanks to a predictable script, wonky dialogue & pacing issues." Mark Hanson, of Slant Magazine, praised John Travolta's performance, but otherwise criticized the film for not "living up to its title." Josh Bell, of Crooked Marquee, gave the film a "C-", saying, "the occasional flashes of competence only make the rest of Paradise City more disheartening, though, and just because it's slightly less of a slog than Willis' other recent work doesn't mean it's worth watching."
