= Bone Dry =

- Directed by: Brett A. Hart
- Written by: Jeff O'Brien; Brett A. Hart
- Starring: Luke Goss; Lance Henriksen
- Release date: 28 February 2008
- Running time: 100 minutes
- Country: United States
- Language: English

Bone Dry is a 2008 American action-thriller film directed, produced by Brett A. Hart & written by Jeff O'Brien & Brett A. Hart. The film stars Luke Goss and Lance Henriksen.

== Cast ==
- Luke Goss as Eddie
- Lance Henriksen as Jimmy
- Tommy 'Tiny' Lister as Mitch
- Dee Wallace as Joanne (credited as Dee Wallace-Stone)
- Jennifer Siebel Newsom as Wife (credited as Jennifer Siebel)
- Carl Buffington as Marty
- Richard Larsen as Cook
- Julia Self as Connie
- Chad Stalcup as Price
- Hudson Thames as Son

== Reception ==
The movie received mostly positive reviews with Niall Browne of Movies in Focus giving 4 out of 5 stars which read "An expertly crafted and well acted B-movie, Bone Dry ticks all the boxes in what you want in a film like this. Brett A. Hart’s thriller will surely become a cult favourite in years to come – and that’s something which it rightfully deserves.". Shawn S. Lealos of Renegade Cinema also gave the movie a positive review citing "It is also tough when the movie was sold to a distributor who never fulfilled their promises of promotion and the movie was buried, only to find the light of day in bargain bins. It is tragic when that movie is very, very good. Bone Dry is one of those movies.". Andrew Pragasam of The Spinning Image said " For what it is, the movie is well put together. Hazy, orange visuals bleach the arid desert, while director Brett A. Hart’s inventive camerawork builds a fine sense of unease." though was a little more critical by saying "Tragically, the climactic twist isn’t bad at all and switches our allegiances in a way that doesn’t leave you feeling cheated.".
