= Breach (2020 film) =

2020 film by John Suits

- Promotional poster
- Directed by: John Suits
- Written by: Edward Drake; Corey Large
- Produced by: Corey Large; Danny Roth; Mike Donovan; Ryan Charles Griffin
- Starring: Cody Kearsley; Bruce Willis; Thomas Jane
- Cinematography: Will Stone
- Music by: Scott Glasgow
- Production companies: 308 Entertainment; Almost Never Films Inc.; Aloe Entertainment; Screen Media Films
- Distributed by: Saban Films
- Release date: December 18, 2020
- Running time: 93 minutes
- Country: United States
- Language: English
- Box office: $39,328

Breach, also titled Anti Life or Anti-Life, is a 2020 American science fiction action horror film directed by John Suits, starring Cody Kearsley, Bruce Willis, Rachel Nichols, Thomas Jane, Johnny Messner, Corey Large, Callan Mulvey, Alexander Kane, and Kassandra Clementi. The film was shot in Fitzgerald, Georgia at the soundstages of TMG Studios. It was released by Saban Films in the United States on December 18, 2020.

== Plot ==
In 2242 A.D., Earth is suffering an extinction level event, and 300,000 survivors are selected to travel aboard the Ark to a new colony, New Earth. Noah stows away as a junior janitor while his pregnant girlfriend Hayley is placed in stasis. Noah is mentored by veteran janitor Clay, who he initially suspects of building a bomb, but Clay reveals he is brewing moonshine.

Two crew members, Blue and Shady, become infected by a parasitic force. During a workers' party, Noah says he will become a butcher on New Earth. Later, Ortega finds Blue behaving strangely and he kills her. Clay discovers that Hayley is Admiral Adams' daughter, while security officer Stanley finds Shady's decomposed body and identifies Blue as the killer. Blue attacks a security team and is shot dead. An autopsy reveals that his body has been hollowed out by a parasite.

Chambers discovers Noah is a stowaway and Stanley arrests him, but Clay defends him and secures his release. The dead crew members then reanimate, killing Stanley and infecting the remaining crew. Clay, Noah, Teek and Chambers escape to the arsenal, where they attempt to fight the infected with a flame thrower. The resulting fire-suppression mist obscures their vision, and Teek is briefly captured before Clay rescues him. Lincoln escapes alone in a pod but is killed offscreen. Stanley attacks the others at the security bay, but Noah shoots him before he can infect Clay.

With 84 days remaining before reaching New Earth, Clay and the survivors seek a way to protect the passengers. Clay helps Noah reach Admiral Adams, while Teek confesses that he is a hardline revolutionary who engineered the events to prevent humanity's repopulation of New Earth. The Admiral awakens his security team and attempts to repel the infected with heavier weapons. Teek is killed, and the security team is overwhelmed. Blue attacks Noah but collapses after being exposed to cleaning fluid. The Admiral sacrifices himself with a grenade, apparently destroying the infected, but their body parts reconnect.

A powerful mutant forms while the remaining infected enter the reactor core. Noah explains that the cleaning fluid weakens them, and the group uses Clay's moonshine to make stronger weapons. Chambers realises that the parasite has manipulated events to gain access to the reactor, while Noah concludes that it intends to destroy both the Ark and the last 50 million humans on New Earth. As the passengers begin becoming infected, Clay sends Noah to rescue Hayley. Chambers is killed by the mutant, and Clay is apparently overwhelmed.

Noah and Hayley reach an escape pod, but Noah must separate from her to initiate the launch. He weakens the mutant, then receives a message from Clay, who sets the Ark to self-destruct as Noah and Hayley escape. They reach New Earth, where Noah discovers that another human is infected. In the distance, a huge monster is attacked by a jet fighter. Noah raises his gun and says, "Burn 'em all".

== Cast ==
- Bruce Willis as Clay Young
- Cody Kearsley as Noah Coral
- Rachel Nichols as Dr. Susan Chambers
- Kassandra Clementi as Hayley Adams
- Johnny Messner as Blue Macon
- Corey Large as Lincoln
- Callan Mulvey as Teek
- Alexander Kane as Commander Riggins
- Timothy V. Murphy as Captain Stanley
- Angie Pack as Isabella Ortega
- Thomas Jane as Admiral Kiernan Adams
- Swen Temmel as Fitzgerald
- Ralf Moeller as Vyrl
- Elicia Davies as Veronica
- Johann Urb as Shady

== Production ==
Production took place in Fitzgerald, Georgia at TMG Studios, filming for three weeks in September and October 2019.

== Release ==
The film was released in theaters and on VOD and digital platforms on December 18, 2020.

== Reception ==
=== Box office ===
As of April 11, 2021, Breach grossed $39,328 in Russia and New Zealand. In its opening weekend in Russia, the film grossed $25,226 from 224 theaters, ranking ninth at the box office with an average of $112 per theater.

=== Critical response ===
On the review aggregator website Rotten Tomatoes, 19% of 16 critics' reviews are positive, with an average rating of 3/10.

JoBlo.com gave the film a 6 out of 10, and said "This is a film that fits into a very specific sub-genre that can work under the right mindset. It's a cheap space-horror flick that's wise enough to put some very likable and charismatic actors upfront."

=== Accolades ===
Award	Category	Recipient(s)	Result	Ref.
Golden Raspberry Awards	Worst Supporting Actor	Bruce Willis (also for Hard Kill and Survive the Night)	Nominated	
