= The Razor's Edge (upcoming film) =

- Directed by: Demian Lichtenstein
- Written by: Demian Lichtenstein; Vance Duplechin
- Produced by: Corey William Large
- Starring: James Franco; Tommy Lee Jones
- Cinematography: Tyler Eckels
- Production company: 308 Enterprises
- Country: United States
- Language: English

The Razor's Edge is an upcoming American action thriller film written by Demian Lichtenstein and Vance Duplechin, directed by Lichtenstein and starring James Franco and Tommy Lee Jones.

== Cast ==
- James Franco as Dante
- Tommy Lee Jones as Taxman

== Production ==
In May 2024, it was announced that Franco and Jones were cast in the film and that principal photography was slated to begin on June 25, 2024, in Georgia.

Filming began in July 2024 in Columbus, Georgia.
