= Cosmic Sin =

2021 American science fiction film by Edward Drake

- Film poster
- Directed by: Edward Drake
- Written by: Edward Drake; Corey Large
- Produced by: Corey Large
- Starring: Bruce Willis; Frank Grillo; Brandon Thomas Lee; Corey Large; Perrey Reeves; C.J. Perry; Lochlyn Munro; Costas Mandylor
- Cinematography: Brandon Cox
- Edited by: Justin Williams
- Music by: Scott Glasgow
- Production company: 308 Entertainment
- Distributed by: Saban Films
- Release date: March 12, 2021 (United States)
- Running time: 88 minutes
- Country: United States
- Language: English
- Box office: $349,757

Cosmic Sin is a 2021 American science fiction action film directed by Edward Drake. The film stars Bruce Willis, Frank Grillo, Brandon Thomas Lee, Corey Large, Perrey Reeves, C.J. Perry, Lochlyn Munro, and Costas Mandylor.

Cosmic Sin was released in the United States on March 12, 2021, by Saban Films. The film was panned by critics and at the 42nd Golden Raspberry Awards won the award for "Worst Performance by Bruce Willis in a 2021 Movie". The award was later rescinded following Willis's diagnosis of aphasia.

== Plot ==
In 2031, humanity establishes its first space colony on Mars. By 2042, the "The Alliance" world government is formed, and quantum propulsion enables travel beyond the Solar System. After the Mars colony fails in 2281, the Alliance controls Earth, Zafdie and Ellora. In 2519, Zafdie attempts to secede, prompting a war in which General James Ford drops a quantum bomb ("Q-bomb") on the rebel colony, killing 70 million people. Dishonourably discharged and dubbed "the Blood General", Ford is abandoned by his wife, Doctor Lea Goss.

In 2524, miners on planet 4217LYA encounter unseen aliens. Captain Juda Sayle reports an "FC incident", and General Eron Ryle summons Ford and Goss. When infected survivors become violently hostile and spread the infection, Ford helps repel them. A tachyon pulse transmitted during the attack may reveal Earth's location to the aliens within hours.

Ryle launches Operation Cosmic Sin with Ford, Goss, Dash, Bleck, Braxton and technician Corporal Ardene. Equipped with Icarus suits and a Q-bomb, they travel to Ellora to analyse a downed alien ship and locate the aliens' home planet. They arrive amid a battle and become separated. Elloran survivors reveal that the planet is overrun by aliens and infected humans. Ardene learns that the aliens are a hive mind that parasitically procreates by infecting victims.

Ford, Dash and Ryle survive, while Ford mercy kills the mortally wounded Bleck. Ardene discovers that the aliens have constructed a quantum space gate near Ellora to invade the Milky Way. The team plans to fire the Q-bomb through it. Ryle, stranded in orbit with a damaged suit, volunteers to sacrifice himself.

The aliens speak through an infected Goss, calling themselves "the Sigea", (Note: This is the first time the aliens or their civilization are named.) and offer humanity assimilation or death. After Dash refuses, they attack. Goss boards a Sigea ship, pursued by Ford, and intercepts the Q-bomb missile in a stasis field before crossing the gate, inadvertently releasing it. Ryle positions himself on the gate and provides a target for the orbital gun; Ardene reluctantly fires, killing him and destroying the gate. The Q-bomb detonates, creating a black hole that destroys the Sigea fleet and home star system.

Seven days after first contact, Braxton, Ardene, Sol Cantos, Dash and Ford gather in a bar as the Alliance Senate announces the Sigea's unconditional surrender. Ford mourns Goss before leaving.

== Cast ==
- Bruce Willis as James Ford
- Frank Grillo as General Eron Ryle
- Brandon Thomas Lee as Braxton Ryle
- Corey Large as "Dash"
- Perrey Reeves as Dr. Lea Goss
- C.J. Perry as Sol Cantos
- Lochlyn Munro as Alex Locke
- Costas Mandylor as Marcus Bleck
- Adelaide Kane as Corporal Fiona Ardene
- Eva De Dominici as Juda Sayle
- Trevor Gretzky as Felix Zand
- Johnny Messner as "Coco" (uncredited cameo)

== Production ==
Principal photography wrapped up in March 2020.

== Release ==
The film was released in theaters, video-on-demand and digital platforms on March 12, 2021. Paramount Home Entertainment released the film on DVD and Blu-ray on May 18, 2021.

=== Box office ===
As of August 27, 2022, Cosmic Sin grossed $349,757 in Ukraine, the United Arab Emirates, Russia, Australia, South Korea, and New Zealand.

== Reception ==
On the review aggregator website Rotten Tomatoes, 6% of 34 critics' reviews are positive, with an average rating of 2.8/10. The website's consensus reads: "Let he who is without Cosmic Sin cast the first stone—and possibly use it to rouse Bruce Willis from the slumber he seems to be in throughout this dreadful sci-fi blunder." Metacritic, which uses a weighted average, assigned the film a score of 9 out of 100, based on 4 critics, indicating "overwhelming dislike".

Christy Lemire of RogerEbert.com gave the film a zero-star negative review and wrote, "To suggest that Bruce Willis is phoning in his performance in Cosmic Sin would be an insult to telephone communication, which can be an effective means of conveying important information and genuine emotion." Lemire called the film "baffling and boring" and commented: "Worst of all, Cosmic Sin isn’t even a bad B-movie in an interesting way."

Noel Murray of the Los Angeles Times wrote that while the film did have some "genuinely impressive special effects sequences" and an ambitious screenplay, it was "pretty tedious" and clichéd. The reviewer commented that while Willis only had minimal screen time in most of his recent pictures, the "good news" in Cosmic Sin was that roughly half of the action directly involved him; however, "The bad news is that he’s somehow more lackluster than usual—something that would seem to be impossible given his recent run." Murray also noted that the film "perks up" when Frank Grillo appears on screen, but that Grillo's screen time was too limited, making him "the Bruce Willis of this movie – offering little more than another recognizable face to put on the poster."

== Accolades ==
Bruce Willis was nominated for his performance in this movie, along with all his other 2021 performances, in the category "Worst Performance by Bruce Willis in a 2021 Movie" at the Golden Raspberry Awards. The category was later rescinded after he announced his retirement from acting due to aphasia.
