= Detective Knight: Rogue =

2022 film by Edward John Drake

- Official release poster
- Directed by: Edward John Drake
- Screenplay by: Edward John Drake
- Story by: Edward John Drake; Corey Large
- Produced by: Randall Emmett; George Furla; Corey Large
- Starring: Bruce Willis; Lochlyn Munro; Jimmy Jean-Louis
- Cinematography: Laffrey Witbrod
- Edited by: Justin Williams
- Music by: Scott Currie
- Production companies: Emmett/Furla Oasis; Buffalo 8 Productions
- Distributed by: Lionsgate
- Release date: October 21, 2022
- Running time: 105 minutes
- Country: United States
- Language: English
- Box office: $95,244

Detective Knight: Rogue (also known as simply Knight) is a 2022 American action film directed by Edward John Drake, from a screenplay by Drake and Corey Large, and produced by Large, Randall Emmett, and George Furla. Serving as the first installment of the Detective Knight film series, it stars Bruce Willis, Lochlyn Munro, and Jimmy Jean-Louis.

Detective Knight: Rogue was released by Lionsgate in limited theaters and VOD on October 21, 2022, followed by its release on DVD and Blu-ray on November 29, 2022.

== Plot ==
In Los Angeles, four masked criminals consisting of Casey, Mercer, Mike, and Sykes rob a courier truck transporting cash. In the ensuing shootout with police, Detective Knight's partner, Fritz, is severely wounded, and the criminals escape to New York City. Officer Sango explains that similar heists are occurring across the country, and that an aircraft belonging to Winna, the owner of a New York-based shell company and former bookie, is present in every city where the heists take place.

In New York, Casey's wife confronts him for his changes in personality and substance abuse. Casey promises to change and takes a job from Winna to steal a sports card from a high-security auction. Casey and his gang proceed with the exception of Mercer, as Casey doesn't trust his temper. Meanwhile, Sango and Knight question Winna, but he refuses to talk. Outside, Winna's bodyguard, Brigga, gives them Casey's name and warns them to stay away from Winna. Knight tracks Casey, whom he recognizes as a former American football player, as Sango fails to establish a partnership with the NYPD chief.

Casey and his team investigate Knight and discover that Winna was a CI who helped Knight kill the man who murdered his father. During the heist, Sykes is caught by an undercover cop, but she manages to offload the card to Winna before being detained. Winna coerces Knight into letting him leave the crime scene after threatening to kill Fritz. Casey receives a call from Winna, who tells him that the police took the card from him, tasking Casey to retrieve the card while he works on freeing Sykes. Suddenly, Winna's assassins ambush them and kill Mike.

The NYPD tells Sango that they will imprison Knight if he impedes the investigation again. Sango discovers Knight's dilemma and informs him that the criminals are all former athletes. They learn of Mike's death and deduce that Winna is tying up loose ends. While on the run, Casey meets with Mercer, and they formulate a plan to kill Winna by stealing the card from the police station. Mercer robs a bank to divert the police's attention, and Casey enters the police station. Shortly after, Mercer is subdued by Sango while Casey is caught by Knight. Knight gives the card to Casey, and they confront Winna. Winna spots them on the security camera and places an order to kill Fritz. In LA, Fitz kills an assassin while Knight kills Winna and Brigga. Sango arrives at the scene and arrests Knight while Casey flees. Casey returns home but is arrested by the police, shocking his wife and daughter.

== Cast ==
- Bruce Willis as James Knight
- Lochlyn Munro as Eric Fitzgerald
- Miranda Edwards as Anna Shea
- Beau Mirchoff as Rhodes
- Corey Large as Mercer
- Johnny Messner as Brigga
- Keeya King (billed as Keeya Keeyes) as Nikki Sykes
- Michael Eklund as Winna
- Jimmy Jean-Louis as Godwin Sango
- Trevor Gretzky as Mike Rochester
- Hunter Daily as Lily
- Alice Comer as Clara
- Paul Johansson as Ricky Conlan
- Cody Kearsley as Dajon

== Production ==
In October 2021, Bruce Willis signed on to star in an action film under the working title Knight. The film was written and directed by Edward John Drake and produced by Randall Emmett and George Furla. Principal photography began in Las Cruces, New Mexico on October 25, 2021. Knight is the first New Mexico film production since the manslaughter incident on Rust. Due to the Rust incident, the production of Knight decided to scrap all plans to use blanks in their prop guns. In an interview with KOAT-TV, Drake said, in reference to not using blanks while filming Knight, "it means a lot more work in post-production for the film to make these weapons look realistic, which is what the blanks are intended to do, so it did increase some costs there but they were more than willing and happy to make those changes to ensure everybody's safety."

Parts of downtown Las Cruces were temporarily closed due to the production's filming schedule. Filming moved to Vancouver, Canada, from November 17 to December 14, 2021. By January 9, 2022, filming had wrapped, according to Trevor Gretzky, who co-stars in the film alongside Willis. Detective Knight: Independence is one of the last films to star Willis, who retired from acting because he was diagnosed with frontotemporal dementia.

== Release ==
Detective Knight: Rogue was released by Lionsgate in limited theaters and VOD on October 21, 2022, followed by its release on DVD and Blu-ray on November 29, 2022.

=== Box office ===
As of February 15, 2023, Detective Knight: Rogue grossed $95,244 in the United Arab Emirates, South Africa, Lithuania, and South Korea.

=== Critical reception ===
On the review aggregator website Rotten Tomatoes, 43% of seven critics' reviews are positive.

Anton Bitel of Projected Figures gave the film a negative review, highlighting the film's "lack of substance". Jeffrey Anderson, of Common Sense Media, gave the film a 2/5 rating, writing "Certainly one of the better Bruce Willis low-budget action movies, this one still suffers from confusing bits, as well as an uncomfortable vacancy where its star ought to have been". Lukas Spathis of Voices From The Balcony gave the film a lightly positive review, saying the film "isn't a great crime film but after a groggy first act, it does give way to some cool crimes, decent characters, and a degree of novelty given the holiday it eventually uses when it's done being cliche". Brian Orndorf of Blu-ray.com gave the film a "D", writing "Drake and co-writer Large do manage to sneak in one bizarre turn of plot before succumbing to the punishing sameness of all these Willis-branded VOD time-killers". In a positive review, Film Threat writer Jason Delgado gave the film a 7/10 rating, summarizing that "the script and Willis offer up a rim-rattling-like dunk of a treat for fans".
