= Wooden horse =

Wooden horse may refer to:

== Arts and entertainment ==
- The Wooden Horse, a 1950 British World War II prisoner of war film
- The Wooden Horse, a 1909 novel by Hugh Walpole
- Wooden Horse (production company), an Australian film and television production company, producer of the 2026 series The Airport Chaplain

== Other uses ==
- Hobby horse (toy), a children's toy
  - Hooden horse, a type of hobby horse used in the hoodening tradition
- Trojan Horse, the wooden horse of Troy, used in the Trojan Wars
- Vault (gymnastics), a piece of equipment used for vaulting in gymnastics
- Wooden horse (device), a torture device

== See also ==
- Carousel, an amusement ride often containing wooden horses
