= Detective Knight: Independence =

2023 American action film by Edward Drake

- Official release poster
- Directed by: Edward John Drake
- Screenplay by: Edward John Drake
- Story by: Edward John Drake; Corey Large
- Produced by: Robert Dean; Corey Large
- Starring: Bruce Willis; Jack Kilmer; Lochlyn Munro; Jimmy Jean-Louis; Willow Shields; Dina Meyer; Timothy V. Murphy
- Cinematography: Laffrey Witbrod
- Edited by: Justin Williams
- Music by: Scott Currie
- Production companies: 308 Ent; Arcana Studio; Buffalo 8 New Mexico
- Distributed by: Lionsgate
- Release date: January 20, 2023
- Running time: 91 minutes
- Country: United States
- Language: English
- Box office: $53,342

Detective Knight: Independence (also known as Devil's Knight) is a 2023 American action film directed by Edward John Drake, who wrote the screenplay and co-wrote the story with Corey Large. Serving as the third and final installment of the Detective Knight film series, and as a sequel to Detective Knight: Redemption (2022), it stars Bruce Willis, Jack Kilmer, Lochlyn Munro, Jimmy Jean-Louis, Willow Shields, Dina Meyer, and Timothy V. Murphy.

Detective Knight: Independence was released by Lionsgate in select theaters and VOD on January 20, 2023, followed by its release on DVD and Blu-ray on February 28, 2023.

== Premise ==
After the events of Redemption, Detective James Knight tries to stop a rogue vigilante and an out-of-control EMT vehicle from putting the city in danger on Independence Day. The detective's race against time also involves saving his own home from a suspected explosion.

== Cast ==
- Bruce Willis as James Knight
- Jack Kilmer as Dezi
- Willow Shields as Ally
- Lochlyn Munro as Fitzgerald
- Michael Sparks as Nico
- Mark Hewlett as Kirill
- Timothy V. Murphy as Vincent
- Jimmy Jean-Louis as Godwin
- Dax Spangole as Quinn
- Lorenzo Antonucci as George
- Scott Cargle as Sean Beston
- Francis Cronin as Peter O'Malley
- Dina Meyer as Burnham
- Kimberley Christiann Pember as James Knight's ex-wife, Camilla

== Production ==
In October 2021, Bruce Willis signed on to star in an action film under the working title Devil's Knight, from writer-director Edward John Drake, for a back-to-back production with Christmas Knight in Vancouver, Canada, from November 17 to December 14, 2021. Filming had wrapped by January 9, 2022, while Trevor Gretzky was confirmed to have reprised his role for both films. By September 2022, Devil's Knight was retitled to Detective Knight: Independence, and set a January 20, 2023 release date. By October 2022, Lochlyn Munro, Jimmy Jean-Louis, Corey Large, and Cesar Miramontes were confirmed to reprise their roles from the first two films, while Willow Shields, Jack Kilmer, Alvaro Calderon, Dina Meyer, and Timothy V. Murphy were added to the cast. Detective Knight: Independence is one of the last films to star Willis, who retired from acting because he was diagnosed with frontotemporal dementia.

== Release ==
Detective Knight: Independence was released by Lionsgate in limited theaters and VOD on January 20, 2023, followed by its release on DVD and Blu-ray on February 28, 2023. The film was previously expected to be delayed to July 2023, to tie into the Independence Day holiday.

=== Box office ===
As of January 3, 2024, Detective Knight: Independence grossed $53,342 in the United Arab Emirates and South Korea.

=== Critical reception ===
On the review aggregator website Rotten Tomatoes, 43% of seven critics' reviews are positive.

Anton Bitel of Projected Figures gave the film a positive review, summarizing that "Edward Drake's police trilogy closer is Bruce Willis' swan song, and a rueful reassessment of his career". Evan Dossey of Midwest Film Journal also gave the film a positive review, saying the film is "the most straightforward of the trilogy, and also the best. Willis gets a little more to do here than in previous Knight thrillers". Michael Szymanski of Mike Szy The Writer gave the film a 9/10 rating, writing, "this crime thriller trilogy of the Detective Knight series is a fitting finale to Bruce Willis's action movie career".

In a negative review, Lapacazo Sandoval of New York Amsterdam News wrote "Would I ever pay money to watch this in a theater, the answer is no. Would I purchase or download this movie on a streaming service, again, the answer is no."
