= Aaron Fruchtman =

American composer, conductor and musicologist

Aaron Fruchtman is an American composer, conductor, and musicologist.

== Biography and works ==
Fruchtman was born in Los Angeles, California and began piano lessons at the age of three. After graduating from Crossroads School for Arts and Sciences in Santa Monica, California, he moved to Boston, Massachusetts where he received his Bachelor of Arts degree from Berklee College of Music and was awarded the Symphony Hall Composer Award. He received an Advanced Studies Certificate in Scoring for Motion Pictures and Television from the USC Thornton School of Music, where he studied with renowned composers David Raksin, Christopher Young, Joe Harnell, Jack Smalley and David Spear. Fruchtman earned a Master of Music degree in composition from University of California, Riverside. Fruchtman earned his Ph.D. studying musicology at the University of California, Riverside with Byron Adams and Walter Clark. His musicological research examines underscores of Jewish-themed films and their composers’ social and cultural world in the Golden Age of Hollywood. He has presented his research at numerous conferences including NYU’s Music and the Moving Image, Youngstown State University’s Jewish Music and Identity, UCLA’s Thinking Beyond the Canon, and at national meetings of the American Musicological Society and the Society for American Music. Fruchtman’s essay titled, “Sounding the Shofar in Hollywood Film Scores” was included in the book Qol Tamid: The Shofar in Ritual, History, and Culture published by Claremont School of Theology Press in 2017. Fruchtman holds music history appointments at California State University, Long Beach and California Lutheran University.

Fruchtman composed scores for the first two feature films directed by Amber Benson, (best known from her role as Tara Maclay on Buffy the Vampire Slayer). Chance was the winner of the Audience Choice Award at the Sidewalk Film Festival and was followed by Lovers, Liars & Lunatics. Following their film collaborations, Fruchtman produced and arranged Benson’s vocal debut on the album You Are Light.

Fruchtman was commissioned to write The Journey, a four-movement piece for narrator, chorus, and orchestra. This epic piece, written expressly for the New York City Master Chorale, tells the historic tale of settlers migrating across the Oregon Trail to the Pacific Ocean. Under the direction of Artistic Director Thea Kano, the New York City Master Chorale premiered The Journey on May 31, 2009, at Alice Tully Hall at Lincoln Center for the Performing Arts. Academy Award-nominated actor Bruce Dern performed the narrator role.
