= Shriekfest =

Horror film festival

Shriekfest Horror Film Festival & Screenplay Competition
- Shriekfest 2011 poster
- Location: Los Angeles, California, U.S. Orlando, Florida, U.S.
- Founded: 2001
- Language: English
- Website: shriekfest.com

Shriekfest Horror Film Festival was a film festival specializing in the horror genre. It was one of the longest running horror festivals in Los Angeles, until 2021. In 2017, Shriekfest expanded to include an Orlando, FL festival location.

== History ==
Shriekfest Horror Film Festival was founded in August 24, 2001. The first festival was held Oct. 27-28, 2001. It is held in October at Raleigh Studios on Melrose Boulevard in the Charlie Chaplin Theatre.

The festival was founded by actress Denise Gossett with her partner Kimberlee Beeson. Gossett came up with the idea after starring in the horror film Chain of Souls. She realized there was a scarcity of film festivals and competitions for the horror genre. She and Beeson created Shriekfest in the hopes that young and upcoming filmmakers and screenwriters would find in it an outlet for their talent. Their partnership lasted until 2003, after which time Todd Beeson became the new partner in the festival.

Shriekfest awards multiple prizes for horror films and screenplays. It also awards films in the science fiction, fantasy, and thriller categories. Prizes include trophies, as well as cash, product awards, and publicity.

The festival also has an under-18 category open to young filmmakers and screenwriters.

Shriekfest went green in 2010 and now accepts screenplays and films via email.

== Awards ==
Shriekfest awards can vary from year to year at judges' requests and have included the following categories. In 2010 two new categories were added to the competition: Webisode and Original Song.

- Best Horror Feature Film
- Best Sci-Fi Feature Film
- Best Fantasy Feature Film
- Best Thriller Feature Film
- Best Short Film
- Best Supershort Film (under 10 minutes)
- Best Feature Screenplay
- Best Short Screenplay
- Best Acting Performance
- Best Cinematography
- Best Special FX
- Best Under-18 Film
- Best Under-18 Screenplay
- Pretty/Scary Award (portrayal of women in horror)
- Audience Choice Award

== Past winners ==
=== 2017 ===
The following are 2017's full-length feature film award winners:

Award	Film	Director
Best Horror Feature Film	Gnaw	Haylar Garcia
Best Sci-Fi Feature Film	The Glass Coffin	Haritz Zubillaga
Best Thriller Feature Film	Curvature	Diego Hallivis

=== 2016 ===
The following are 2016's full-length feature film award winners:

Award	Film	Director
Best Horror Feature Film	Capture Kill Release	Nick McAnulty and Brian Allan Stewart
Best Sci-Fi Feature Film	Occupants	Russ Emanuel
Best Thriller Feature Film	Dead Awake	Phillip Guzman

=== 2015 ===
The following are 2015's full-length feature film award winners:

Award	Film	Director
Best Horror Feature Film	Interior	Zachary Beckler
Best Sci-Fi Feature Film	The Answer	Iqbal Ahmed
Best Thriller Feature Film	Landmine Goes Click	Levan Bakhia

=== 2014 ===
The following are 2014's full-length feature film award winners:

Award	Film	Director
Best Horror Feature Film	Berkshire County	Audrey Cummings
Best Sci-Fi Feature Film	Time Lapse	Bradley King
Best Thriller Feature Film	Nightmare Code	Mark Netter

=== 2013 ===
The following are 2013's full-length feature film award winners:

Award	Film	Director
Best Horror Feature Film	An American Terror	Haylar Garcia
Best Sci-Fi Feature Film	Abducted	Glen Scantlebury and Lucy Phillips
Best Thriller Feature Film	The Last Light	Andrew Hyatt

=== 2012 ===
The following are 2012's full-length feature film award winners:

Award	Film	Director
Best Horror Feature Film	Nailbiter	Patrick Rea
Best Sci-Fi Feature Film	Found in Time	Arthur Vincie
Best Thriller Feature Film	It's in the Blood	Scooter Downey

=== 2011 ===
The following are 2011's full-length feature film award winners:

Award	Film	Director
Best Horror Feature Film	Absentia	Mike Flanagan
Best Sci-Fi Feature Film	Pig	Henry Barrial
Best Supernatural Feature Film	The Dead Inside	Travis Betz
Best Thriller Feature Film	Isle of Dogs	Tammi Sutton

=== 2010 ===
The following are 2010's full-length feature film award winners:

Award	Film	Director
Best Horror Feature Film	Ashes	Elias Matar
Best Sci-Fi Feature Film	Transfer	Damir Lukacevic
Audience Choice Award	Grey Skies	Kai Blackwood

=== 2009 ===
The following are 2009's full-length feature film award winners:

Award	Film	Director
Best Horror Feature Film	Dark House	Darin Scott
Best Sci-Fi Fantasy Film	Spike	Robert Beaucage
Audience Choice Award	Lo	Travis Betz

=== 2008 ===
The following are 2008's full-length feature film award winners:

Award	Film	Director
Best Horror Feature Film	Bane	James Eaves
Best Thriller Feature Film	Alien Raiders	Ben Rock
Audience Choice Award	The Open Door	Doc Duhame

=== 2007 ===
The following are 2007's full-length feature film award winners:

Award	Film	Director
Best Feature Film	The Chair	Brett Sullivan
Pretty/Scary Award	The Cellar Door	Matt Zettell
Audience Choice Award	The Cellar Door	Matt Zettell

=== 2006 ===
The following are 2006's full-length feature film award winners:

Award	Film	Director
Best Horror Feature Film	The Other Side	Gregg Bishop
Audience Choice Award	Bad Reputation	Jimmy Hemphill
Best Cinematography	Penny Dreadful	Richard Brandes

=== 2005 ===
The following are 2005's full-length feature film award winners:

Award	Film	Director
Best Horror Feature Film	Dark Remains	Brian Avenet-Bradley
Best Sci-Fi Feature Film	Experiment	Daniel Turner
Best Thriller Feature Film	Razor Eaters	Shannon Young

=== 2004 ===
The following are 2004's full-length feature film award winners:

Award	Film	Director
Best Horror Feature Film	Dead and Breakfast	Matthew Leutwyler
Best Sci-Fi Feature Film	Tales from Beyond	Josh Austin, Nate Barlow, Eric Manning, Russell Scott
Fan Favorite	Roadside Attractions	CJ Roy

=== 2003 ===
The following are 2003's full-length feature film award winners:

Award	Film	Director
Best Film in the Feature Category	Lucky	Steve Cuden
Best Film in the Sci-Fi Category	Transfer	John Turbyne
Fan Favorite	Lucky	Steve Cuden

=== 2002 ===
The following are 2002's full-length feature film award winners:

Award	Film	Director
Best Film in the Feature Category	Terror Tract	Clint Hutchison & Lance W. Dreeson
Best Comedy Horror	Burning Passion	Brian Belefant
Best Special FX in the Feature Category	Despiser	Philip Cook
Fan Favorite	Hell's Highway	S. Lee Taylor

=== 2001 ===
The following are 2001's full-length feature film award winners:

Award	Film	Director
Best Film in the Thriller Category	Siren	Steve Morris
Best Film in the Feature Category	The Wind	Michael Mongillo
Scariest Film	Memorial Day	dMarcos Gabriel & Chris Alender
