= Nate Barlow =

American actor (born 1975)

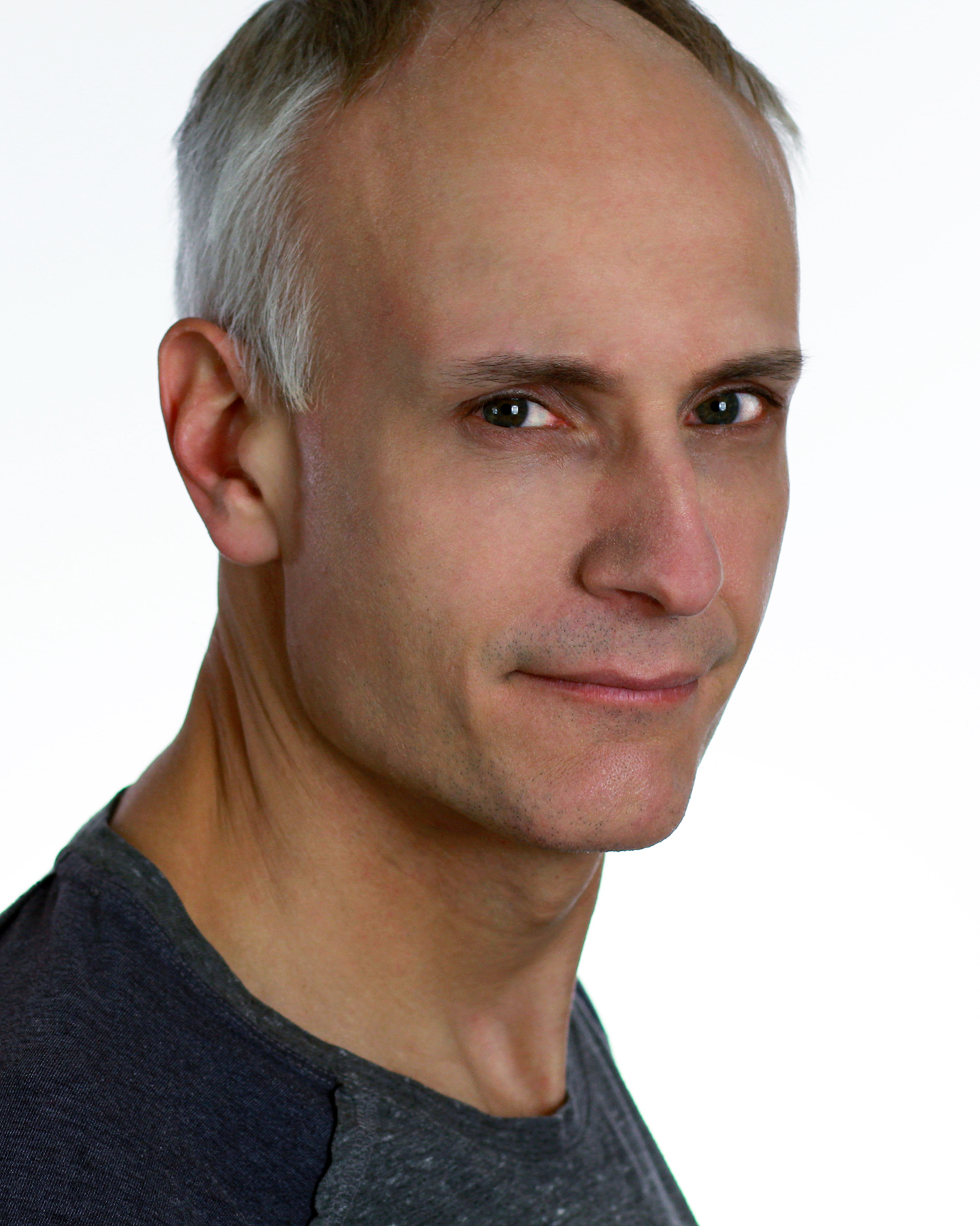
- Born: July 6, 1975 (age 50); Middletown, Connecticut
- Occupations: Director; producer; screenwriter; actor

Nate Barlow (born Nathanael Jackson Barlow on July 6, 1975) is an American film director, producer, screenwriter and actor. He was born in Middletown, Connecticut and his parents are musicians and teachers, As a child he lived for two years in Tanzania in East Africa where he attended the International School Moshi. He graduated with a Bachelor of Science degree in electrical and computer engineering from Carnegie Mellon University in Pittsburgh, Pennsylvania in 1996, after which he worked as a designer engineer for Symbol Technologies headquartered in Holtsville, New York on Long Island before moving to Los Angeles to pursue his filmmaking career.

== Documentaries ==
Barlow wrote Random Encounters, starring Meghan Markle, a romantic-comedy directed by Boris Undorf and initially distributed by Gravitas Ventures. Random Encounters was rereleased in the U.K. as A Random Encounter, on May 7, 2018. Barlow co-directed, co-wrote and co-starred in Tales from Beyond, an anthology feature film starring Adam West which won Best Picture Awards at the 2004 ShockerFest International Film Festival and 2004 Shriekfest Film Festivals before being distributed by Anthem Pictures.

Most recently, Barlow has worked in documentaries, co-producing the scotch whisky documentary The Water of Life - A Whisky Film, distributed nationwide by PBS. He directed the experimental animated short A Brief History of Hollywood, which intertwines the history of the Hollywood sign with the history of Hollywood technology. A Brief History of Hollywood has played numerous festivals including Dances With Films, St. Louis International Film Festival, Hot Springs Documentary Film Festival, Sonoma International Film Festival, and the San Francisco Frozen Film Festival. Film Threat said that A Brief History of Hollywood is "fantastic" and "irresistible nostalgia porn," rating the film 8/10. His latest project, Independent Spirits - A Whisky Series (a companion piece to The Water of Life), premiered in Edinburgh, Scotland in March 2025 at the inaugural Independent Spirits Festival, a whisky festival which he also helped produce.

A fan of both classic cinema and The Wizard of Oz, Barlow premiered his restoration of the silent film His Majesty, the Scarecrow of Oz at the CharlOz Festival in Charlotte, North Carolina in September 2024. L. Frank Baum made the original film with his Oz Film Manufacturing Company. Barlow restored the film from fresh 4K transfers of three partial 35mm prints: two reels of safety positive, three reels of the tinted Moovical print, and two reels of original picture negative, not known to exist until Barlow rediscovered them at the Library of Congress.

Early in his career, Barlow directed the short Film Trix 2002, a documentary consisting of interviews and produced the narrative feature film Hollywood, Pennsylvania, which had a live broadcast from the set showing how it was made before the concept of live-streaming via mobile phones existed. Barlow acted in L.A. Twister, the lowest-budgeted film ever to premiere at Grauman's Chinese Theatre, and Chance, the directorial debut of Amber Benson in addition to performing in commercials. He lives in Los Angeles.

== Filmography ==
=== Director ===
- A Brief History of Hollywood (2020)
- Tales from Beyond (2004)
- Film Trix 2002 (2002)

=== Producer ===
- Independent Spirits - A Whisky Series (2025)
- His Majesty, The Scarecrow of Oz Silent Film Restoration (producer & restorer) (2024)
- The Water of Life - A Whisky Film (co-producer) (2021)
- A Brief History of Hollywood (2020)
- Tales from Beyond (2004)
- Chance (associate producer) (2002)
- Film Trix 2002 (2002)
- Hollywood, Pennsylvania (2001)
- Take It Easy (1999)

=== Screenwriter ===
- A Brief History of Hollywood (2020)
- Random Encounters (2010)
- Tales from Beyond (2004)

=== Actor ===
- Random Encounters (2010)
- Tales from Beyond (2004)
- L.A. Twister (2004)
- Chance (2002)
- Hollywood, Pennsylvania (2001)
- Yup Yup Man (aka Dark Justice) (2000)
- Killing The Vision (1999)
- Take It Easy (1999)
