= Random Encounter =

A random encounter is a method governing encounters with enemies in many RPG video games.

Random Encounter may also refer to:

- Random Encounter (film), a 1998 crime thriller film
- Random Encounters, a 2013 American film
- Random Encounter (band), an independent American video game inspired rock group that features an accordion
- Serious Sam: The Random Encounter, a 2011 video game
