= Battalion of Saints =

American hardcore punk band

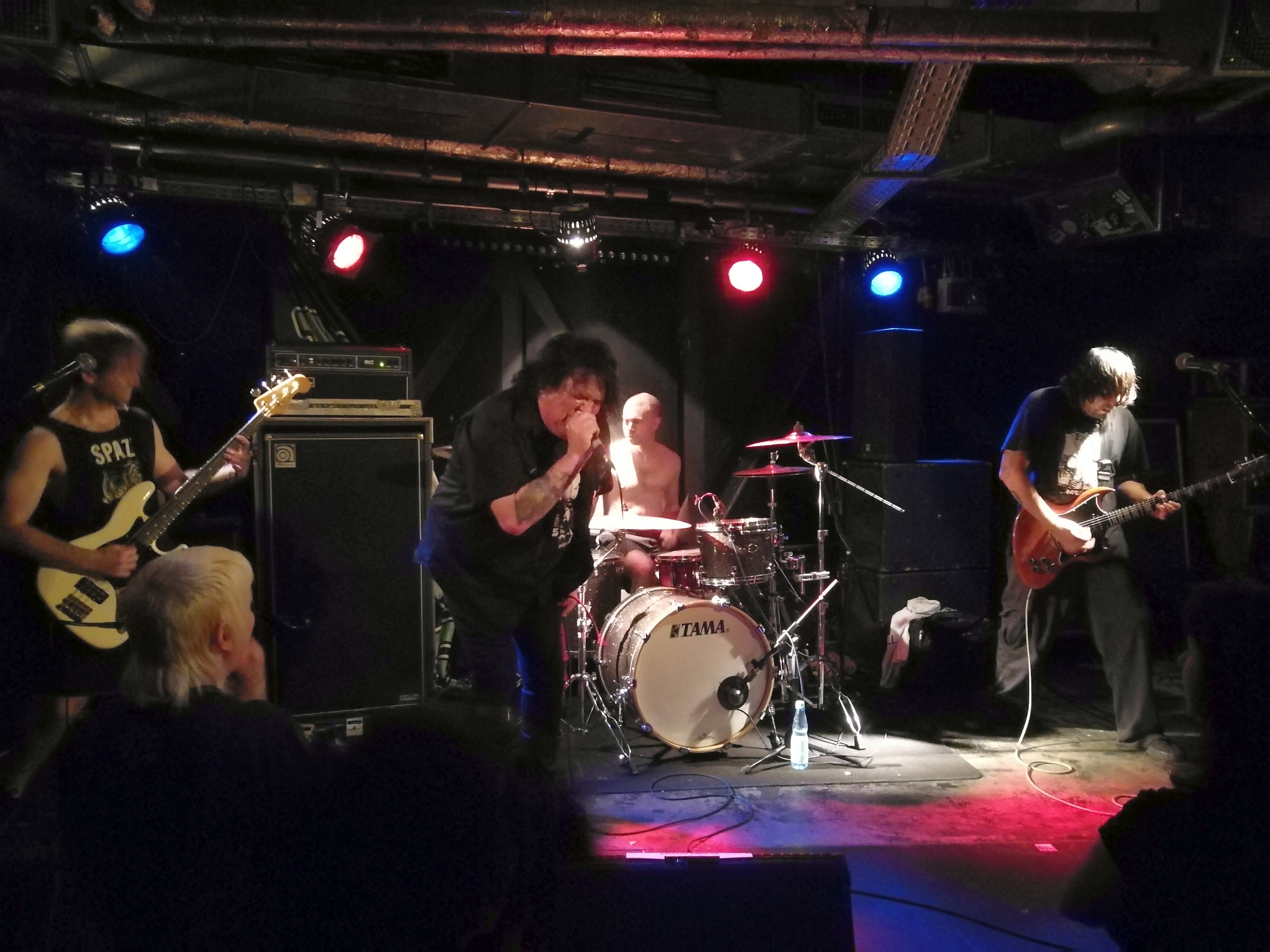
- Battalion of Saints in 2018. Left to right: Dylan DeCarlo, George Anthony, Tino Valpa, Mike Cantrell.

Background information
- Origin: San Diego, California, U.S.
- Genres: Punk rock, hardcore punk
- Years active: 1980–1985; 1995–2019
- Labels: Mystic, Enigma, Taang!, Pine Hill
- Members: George Anthony; Tino Valpa; Mike Cantrell; Dylan DeCarlo
- Past members: Chris Smith; Joey Wrecked (Maya); James Cooper; Captain Scarlett (David Lloyd); Ted Olson; Dennis Frame; Mike Shock; Mike Monster; Gearbox; Terry "Tezz" Roberts; Ken Ortman; Mark Bender; Gregor Kramer; Dave Astor; Barry Farwell; Thrashley Register; Travis Davidson; John Hatfield; Matt Vicknair; Mike Vega; Nathan Javier; Chris Squire; Mario Rubalcaba; Mike Avilez

Battalion of Saints was an American hardcore punk band from San Diego, California, that was founded in 1980.

== History ==
The band went through numerous lineup changes before touring the United States and Canada from 1984–1985 with George Anthony, Chris Smith, James Cooper and Joey Wrecked (Maya). Half-way through the 1985 summer tour, the road manager Captain Scarlett (David Lloyd) replaced James Cooper on bass.

The band officially broke up in 1985. Singer George Anthony re-formed the band in 1995 with Terry "Tezz" Roberts (veteran of British punk bands Discharge, Broken Bones, and U.K. Subs) and signed with Taang! Records, which reissued most of their material on the Death-R-Us CD. In 2005 While on tour Battalion Of Saints performed at legendary CBGB's and the Pipeline in Newark, NJ. They recorded a Live L.P. with producer and sound engineer Marty Munsch of Punk Rock Records.

In late 1996, George Anthony formed a band of hard core San Diego DAGO misfits consisting of Jason Graham, Mike (wingnut) Clingerman and Richard G. White. The group recorded a cover of Alice Cooper's "Muscle of Love" and an original song, "I don't know (Hit the Bricks)" with Taang records. They then went on to tour of most of Europe.

Up till April 2012, the band was still playing shows in southern California with the lineup consisting of Mike Shock, Mike Monster and Gearbox. After that time, original founding member George Anthony decided to reform the group, bringing in John Hatfield on lead guitar, Thrashley on rhythm guitar, Matthew Vicknair on bass and Mike Vega on drums. With this lineup, songs that had not been included in the band's set list for years were added. After doing a number of local shows, the band did a short tour in the summer of 2012 up the West Coast with support act "13 Scars". The band has since played a steady run of shows, sharing the stage with bands such as D.I, Naked Aggression, Fang and Poison Idea.

In 2015, Thrashley left Battalion of Saints and the band returned to the classic four piece, single guitar sound. In mid 2015 the band released a self titled 7'-inch entitled "Southern Lord" with John Hatfield, Matt Vicknair, Mike Vega and George Anthony. John Hatfield left the band in late 2015 and Nathan Javier took his place. Originally tour packaged with Phobia and The Nomads, later this year the band toured the US. Both Phobia and The Nomads dropped the tour less than 24 hours before it started, leaving Battalion Of Saints as the sole remaining act. Nonetheless the band continued the tour solo, thus completing their first full US tour in decades.

In 2017, the band completed the three-month "If It Kills Us" USA tour with The Cryptics. This was the first tour with new drummer Tino Valpa along with fill in members Mike Avilez on bass and Steve Porter on Guitar.

In 2018, the band completed a three-week summer European tour of club shows and festivals including Rebellion Festival, Bloodstains Festival & Ieper Festival. George Anthony and Tino Valpa were joined by Mike Cantrell on guitar and Dylan DeCarlo on bass for this tour. This was the band's first overseas appearance since 1996.

Amidst internal conflict the band disbanded in 2019 with no warning or formality. Most members remain active in other projects.

== Discography ==
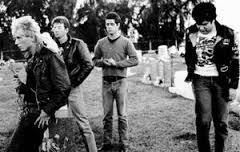
The band in 1983

=== Releases ===
- Fighting Boys 12" (Nutron, 1982)
- Second Coming 7" (Mystic, 1983)
- Second Coming LP (Nutron, 1984)
- Rock in Peace LP (Mystic, 1988)
- Battalion of Saints A.D. 7" (Taang!, 1994)
- Cuts CD (Taang!, 1996)
- Muscle of Love 7" (Taang!, 1997)
- Live at CBGB's LPCD (Punk Rock Records)
- Self Titled 7" (Southern Lord, 2015)

=== Reissues ===
- Death-R-Us CD (Taang!, includes all previous releases and compilation tracks except Second Coming 7")

=== Compilations ===
- Meathouse tape (Version Sound, 1982): "Holy Vision", "Witchworld"
- Someone Got Their Head Kicked In LP (BYO, 1982): "Beefmasters", "No More Lies", "Cops Are Out"
- Eastern Front vol. 2 LP (Eastern Front/Enigma, 1982): "Fighting Boys"
- Complete Discography 3xLP / 2xCD (Pine Hill Records, 2018)
- Our Blow Out tape (Slow Death, 1983)
- The Sound of Hollywood No. 2: Destroy L.A. LP (Mystic, 1983): "Sweaty Little Girls"
- Super Seven Sampler LP (Mystic, 1987) "Second Coming"
- Punk Rock Christmas CD (Cleopatra, 2015) "Jingle Bells"
- Complete Discography 3xLP / 2xCD (Pine Hill Records, 2018)
