= Lovers, Liars & Lunatics =

- Directed by: Amber Benson
- Written by: Amber Benson
- Produced by: Amber Benson; Danielle Benson; Diane Benson; Brooke Bundy
- Starring: Amber Benson; Christine Estabrook; Vic Polizos; Michael Muhney; Mia Cottet
- Cinematography: Jakobine Motz
- Edited by: Amber Benson
- Music by: Aaron Fruchtman
- Production company: Benson Entertainment Inc.
- Distributed by: Showcase Entertainment
- Release date: November 2006
- Running time: 87 minutes
- Country: United States
- Language: English

Lovers, Liars & Lunatics is an independent American film written, produced and directed by Amber Benson.

Much like with her first self-produced film, Chance, Benson appealed to her fans for donations to help finance the production, including offering personal and signed items for bid at online auctions and selling special edition Tara action figures to raise money. Fans were also solicited for suggested titles for the project initially called "The Dirty Script," and Lovers, Liars & Lunatics was eventually selected from the many entries.

Benson turned to several friends to act in the film, including Christine Estabrook, James Leary (Clem, Buffy the Vampire Slayer), Michael Muhney (Don Lamb, Veronica Mars), and Rayder Woods. Benson herself co-stars in the production.

Dubbed "a convoluted story of lust, deception and accidental murder," this black dramedy plans to hit the film festival circuit before going into wider release.

== Plot ==
Set mostly during one long day and night, Lovers, Liars & Lunatics follows a dysfunctional suburban Los Angeles family. Paddy Rayne (Vic Polizos) is the manager of a local retail store who is having an affair with his secretary Gloria (Mia Cottet). Paddy wants to leave his neurotic, highly contemptuous wife Elaine (Christine Estabrook) to live with his mistress. Unfortunately Gloria just wants Paddy's money. He hides the money at home. Gloria calls on her two "associates", Gloria's younger brother Louis (Michael Muhney), and his dim-witted girlfriend Justine (Amber Benson), to rob the Raynes when the house is empty that night.

Elaine figures out the affair and steals Paddy's money from the kitchen cupboard spice bottles. She plans to leave him in the morning. Both cancel their getaway plans to Bakersfield.

Later that night, Louis and Justine arrive at the house to rob it, only to be surprised by finding Paddy and Elaine still there, forcing the inept burglars to tie them up. But soon, Louis and Justine realize they cannot leave, for their getaway car is missing (Justine had accidentally left the drive gear on), plus Paddy's other car is gone (their son Gunner had taken it for his date with Sally). Soon, the couple is bickering at each other. Louis demands to know where they keep their money. Soon, Julian, the couple's other son, walks in and he too is soon tied up. When Gunner and a drunken Sally return from their late-night date, they are also caught at gunpoint and tied up by the increasingly desperate Louis and Justine.

Paddy, in the seclusion of a nearby bathroom, tells Louis that he will give him his wealth totaling $140,000 if he kills his wife so he can be free of her constant nagging, while Elaine later tells Louis that she will give him $15,000 of the store's retail profits if he kills Paddy's mistress, Gloria. But Elaine doesn't know that it was Gloria whom hired Louis to rob their house in the first place.

As the night drags on, the events lead to Gloria's arrival, wanting to know what is taking so long with the robbery, as well as the arrival of two persistent, but equally inept, policemen whom threaten to blow everything out of proportions. Justine literally shoots herself in the foot with the gun, forcing her to untie Elaine to tend to her wound. At the same time, Gloria has wild sex with Paddy in the bathroom to get to him to talk where he is keeping his money, which leads to him dying from a sudden heart attack. (Earlier that evening, Elaine had switched his heart medication with Viagra.) Gloria then learns from Louis about a $140,000 cashier's check and takes it from him. In another argument, Gloria accidentally shoots Justine, leading to chaos as Elaine takes advantage of it to untie everybody. Louis attacks Gloria, while Gunner intervenes, in which he slips and fatally hits his head against the kitchen counter. Elaine grabs a baseball bat and bludgeons Louis to death with it. While Julian flees, Sally runs outside to chase after the departing police, only to get accidentally run over by the cop car. The two policemen return to the scene, where they catch and arrest Gloria as she's leaving the house. Investigating, the two policemen find all the dead people with Elaine apparently the only one alive. But in an off-the-wall, final joke, it's strongly hinted that Elaine could get blamed for all the deaths because of her erratic personality, having been driven over the edge of sanity from this ordeal, with the final shot of her babbling to the two cops about her husband having an affair, and then she rants about not having the best TV sound speakers.

== Cast ==
- Amber Benson as Justine
- Mia Cottet as Gloria
- James Leary as Policeman #1
- Bianca Lopez as Sally
- Michael Muhney as Louis
- Vic Polizos as Paddy Raye
- Ryan Spahn as Julian Raye
- Cole Williams as Gunner Raye
- Rayder Woods as Policeman #2
- with Christine Estabrook as Elaine Raye

== Release ==
It was scheduled to be released on DVD via the film's studio Benson Entertainment Inc. in September 2006, but due to technical difficulties the release was rescheduled to November.

In September 2023, Showcase Entertainment acquired all worldwide distribution rights for the film (alongside Chance) and subsequently re-released it in January 2024.

== Production details ==
- Paddy and Elaine's house, where most of the film takes place, belongs to Amber Benson.
- The glasses used in the film are nonic pint glasses, though they are used as water glasses. The same style of glasses was used in Chance.
- As with her first film, Benson called on several previous co-workers to work on this project: cinematographer Jakobine Motz did the cinematography for a 1999 short film called Deadtime in which Benson starred, James Leary played lovable demon Clem on Buffy, and Cole Williams starred with Benson in the 2005 indie film Race You to the Bottom. While friends before this collaboration, Benson also appeared with Michael Muhney in the 2006 independent film Angst, which Muhney also co-wrote.
