= Strictly Sexual =

- Directed by: Joel Viertel
- Written by: Stevie Long
- Produced by: Joel Viertel & David Kohner Zuckerman
- Starring: Amber Benson; Johann Urb; Kristen Kerr; Stevie Long; Trevor Murphy
- Music by: H. Scott Salinas
- Production companies: DKZ Films; Hyphenate Films; Kambam-Ramnath-Weston Productions; Strictly Xmd Productions
- Distributed by: Arts Alliance; Alpha Filmes
- Release date: December 2, 2008
- Running time: 100 minutes
- Country: United States
- Language: English
- Budget: $100,000

Strictly Sexual is a 2008 American comedy film directed by Joel Viertel, written by Stevie Long, and starring Amber Benson, Johann Urb, Kristen Kerr, Stevie Long, and Trevor Murphy. Considered a cult film, it was remade into a series; a 2025 remake is currently in production.

== Synopsis ==
"Two successful women, sick and tired of dating and relationships, decide to keep two young men in their pool house for strictly sexual purposes."

In Los Angeles, the wealthy aspiring writer Donna and her best friend, an aspiring designer, Christi Ann are bored of relationships and decide to chase two escorts in a bar for a one-night stand. Meanwhile, construction workers and best friends, Stanny and Joe, come from New York but can't find jobs in Los Angeles. Without money, the guys decide to go to a fancy bar to drink and leave the place without paying the bill. Donna and Christi Ann meet Stanny and Joe and invite them home believing they are gigolos. After a night of sex, the women discover the misunderstanding and that the men are, indeed, unemployed construction workers. The women offer to have the men stay in their swimming pool cabana, furnishing them with beer and food while the boys search for jobs. In return, they would be their on-call "boy-toys" in a strictly sexual relationship. During the ensuing months, the couples become closer and change their feelings and behaviors with the development and growing of their relationships as the couples begin to develop romantic feelings.

== Cast ==
- Johann Urb as Joe
- Stevie Long as Stanny
- Amber Benson as Donna
- Kristen Kerr as Christi Ann
- Trevor Murphy as Damian
- Brooke Allen as Cassandra
- Elizabeth Wood as Fabric Woman
- Ashley Hinson as Boutique Employee
- Shravan Kambam as Niki
- Scott Weston as Scott
- Rick Ramnath as Rich
- Lindsay Frame as Complimentary Woman
- Carlos Conrado Sanchez as Carlos
- Justin Phillips as Justin
- Mark Radcliffe as Mark

== Reception ==
NPR reported that Strictly Sexual was the most-watched film of all time on Hulu.com as of February 2010.

Christopher Armstead wrote that the film was ”among the most entertaining relationship based movies [he had] e seen in a long time.”

== TV series ==
In 2011, Hulu produced a six-episode spin-off series, Strictly Sexual: The Series, featuring some of the original cast.

Cast (incomplete)

- Johann Urb as Joe
- Stevie Long as Stanny
- Kristen Renton as Summer
- Mercedes Manning as Georgia
- Elvina Beck as Shoot

Episodes

- Pilot
- Girls, Smarter... Boys, Funnier
- Third Wheelin' It with Lesbians
- The Threesome Episode
- Let's Hit Pause
- Laugh, Cry, Say Goodbye
