= Pariah (1998 film) =

1998 film directed by Randolph Kret

- Directed by: Randolph Kret
- Written by: Randolph Kret
- Starring: Damon Jones; David Oren Ward; Angela Jones
- Cinematography: Nils Erickson
- Edited by: Bill DeRonde
- Music by: Scott Grusin
- Distributed by: Indican Pictures
- Release date: 1998
- Running time: 100 minutes
- Country: United States
- Language: English
- Box office: $190,096

Pariah is a 1998 American dramatic film written and directed by Randolph Kret and starring Damon Jones, Dave Oren Ward, and Angela Jones.

== Synopsis ==
The gang-rape by a group of neo-Nazis of an African American woman, Sam (Elexa Williams), triggers her suicide. Her caucasian boyfriend Steve (Damon Jones) finds little recourse other than to plot revenge, and decides to infiltrate the gang. As a member he gains insight into the factors behind the neo-Nazi movement, but he is eventually confronted with the choice of committing a murder to prove his loyalty or reveal his cover.

== Cast ==
- Damon Jones as Steve
- David Oren Ward as Crew
- Davidlee Willson (as David Lee Wilson) as David Lee
- Aimee Chaffin as Sissy
- Angela Jones as Angela
- Anna Padgett as Lex
- Dan Weene as Joey
- Ann Russo (as Ann Zupa) as Babe
- Brandon Slater as Doughboy
- Jason Posey as Kevin
- Chris Jarecki as Tall Guy
- Terence Washington as Mario
- Orlando Estrada as Aaron
- Robert Hargett as Rob
- Tyrone Young as Ty
- Elexa Williams as Sam
- Tupelo Jereme as Rachel
- Ray Wadsworth as Bobby
- Kelly McCreary as Steve's Sister
- Joe Wood as Crew's Dad / Special Appearance
- Jean Rose as Grandma
- Clint Curtis as The Preacher
- Lynn Odell as David Lee's Mother
- Michael Turner as Ray - Stepfather
- Richard Bernard as Richard / Lavender Mob
- Raymond Kuhar as Ray / Lavender Mob
- Candy Ass as The Drag Queen
- JJ Snyder (as J.J. Snyder) as The Prostitute
- Dan Stanley as The Clerk
- Jane Riese (as Jane Reese) as Sam's Mother
- Tracy House as Tracy
- Bill Stevens as Bill
- Lisa Keller as Girl Assaulted (as Lisa Kellog)
- Catherine Taber (as Cat Tabor) as Her Friend
- Josef Snyder as Jewish Beating Victim
- Jay Giankabutuka (as J. Matthew Morton) as Party Victim
- Dylan Wood as Dylan
- Nils Erickson as Red Car Salesman

== Production ==
Randolph Kret wrote and directed the film which is based on an incident from the life of a friend. The Scott Grusin film score includes songs by anti-racist hardcore bands Minor Threat, U.S. Chaos, Social Unrest and the Wives.

== Reception and review ==
Roger Ebert wrote that "Godard said that one way to criticize a movie is to make another movie. Pariah, a raw and unblinking look at the skinhead subculture, is a movie I'd like to show to those admirers of Fight Club who have assured me of their movie's greatness." Ebert gave the film three out of four stars. The Los Angeles Times called the film "a volatile, edgy picture of strong visceral impact."TV Guide called it a "well-meaning but ridiculous revenge drama". Bill Gibron of DVD Talk rated it 3/5 stars and wrote that while the film is realistic, it may not entertain viewers. In a negative review, Michael Atkinson of The Village Voice wrote, "Kret clearly has his heart in the right place: Hate Is Bad. If only being right were all you needed." On Rotten Tomatoes the film has a rating of 47% from seventeen reviews.

New York Times reviewer A. O. Scott commented that the theme of an "ordinary, tolerant white person going undercover into a world of extreme race-hatred" was a promising one and adds that the movie opens with a voiceover of the Rev. Dr. Martin Luther King Jr. warning that "racism is a sickness unto death". He compares Pariah to the 1988 Constantin Costa-Gavras film Betrayed starring Debra Winger and Tom Berenger which had a similar plot. He also wrote, "Racist extremism is a problem. We need movies that address it. Chances are you already agree with these propositions. All Pariah succeeds in doing is screaming them at you, at maximum volume, over and over and over."

== Release ==
The Randolph Kret written and directed film was screened at the 1998 Slamdance Film Festival before a limited theater release.

It received a "25th anniversary" rerelease to theaters in June 2025

== Home media ==
The film was released on DVD on July 11, 2006.
