= Ryan Scott Greene =

Canadian actor

- Born: 25 June 1973 (age 52); Halifax, Nova Scotia, Canada
- Occupation: Actor
- Years active: 1999–present

Ryan Scott Greene (born 25 June 1973) is a Canadian actor, most known for his portrayal of Marcus in the MyNetworkTV telenovela Saints & Sinners. Other notable works include Queer as Folk, Carolina and Beach Girls.

== Filmography and other appearances ==
Film
Year	Title	Role	Notes
1999	Witchouse	Brad	
2003	Carolina	Seth	
2004	Vendetta: No Conscience, No Mercy	Teen Sean	
2006	A Bug and a Bag of Weed	Marcel	
2011	Hit List	Bart	
2011	Away		
Television
Year	Title	Role	Notes
1997	La Femme Nikita	Peter	Episode 1:06: Love
1999	Undressed	Ian	Episode 1.17: Twice a Virgin
2000	Grosse Pointe	Deegan	Episode 1.09: Boys on the Side
2003	Mutant X	Tyler Ryan	Episode 2.12: At Destiny's End
2004	Sue Thomas: F.B.Eye	Adam Kinsey	Episode 3.05: The Actor; Episode 3.06: Planes, Trains and Automobiles
2005	Beach Girls	Chad	Episode 1.01; Episode 1.02; Episode 1.03; Episode 1.04; Episode 1.05
2005	Queer as Folk	Brandon	Episode 5.06; Episode 5.07; Episode 5.08; Episode 5.13: We Will Survive! (uncredited)
2007	Saints & Sinners	Marcus	Main cast
2010	Second Chances	Lukas Kelley	Made-for-television film
2012	Criminal Minds	Jimmy	Episode 7.14: Closing Time
Shorts
Year	Title	Role	Notes
2003	The Yellow Truth	Oliver Pebble	
2004	Skin Trade	Skip	
2009	Bottom Feeders	Duke Seaton	
2011	Alone	Bryan	
2012	Mohawk Midnight Runners	Justin	Post-production
Conventions
Year	Title	Role	Notes
2013	Rise 'n Shine USA; Los Angeles, California, USA	Himself	9 June. QAF convention with co-actors Randy Harrison, Scott Lowell, Peter Paige, Robert Gant, Michelle Clunie & Gale Harold
