= Chance (2002 film) =

- Directed by: Amber Benson
- Written by: Amber Benson
- Produced by: Amber Benson; Danielle Benson; Diane Benson; Kelly Wheeler; Rupert Cole
- Starring: Amber Benson; James Marsters; Christine Estabrook; Andy Hallett
- Cinematography: Patrice Lucien Cochet
- Edited by: Joshua Charson
- Music by: Aaron Fruchtman
- Distributed by: Benson Entertainment Inc.
- Release date: September 22, 2002 (Birmingham Sidewalk Film Festival)
- Running time: 75 minutes
- Country: United States
- Language: English
- Budget: $75,000 (estimate)

Chance is a 2002 film, the directing debut of actress Amber Benson. Benson directed, wrote, produced and starred in this film. Many of Benson's co-stars from the television series Buffy the Vampire Slayer appeared in the film.

As documented on Chance's official site, the cost of making the film ended up being more than triple the estimate. Though Benson originally thought that she would foot the bill herself, she decided to ask fans for support. Signed photos of Benson on the set of the film, as well as scripts and props, were sold to raise money.

Benson's production company, Benson Entertainment, distributes the movie on DVD and video.

== Plot ==
Chance is a twenty-something slacker living in Los Angeles, who relies on a trust fund for finances and shares an apartment with her friend Simon, an unsuccessful telemarketer who is self-conscious about his body odor. One day, Simon comes home from the grocery store to find a dead woman in Chance's bed.

The film then goes back several months. Chance is annoyed when Rory, a struggling soap opera actor with whom Chance had a one-night stand, appears at her door and becomes emotional trying to convince her that they have a connection beyond just sex. Chance and Simon spin a story about meeting in a mental institution, which makes Rory uncomfortable enough to stop crying and to leave.

Simon tricks Chance into answering a phone call from her mother by telling her that it is a man named Jack whom she was immediately attracted to when she met him at a nightclub. Her mother, Desiree, is calling to tell her that she is coming to visit. Trying to escape spending time with her mother, Chance persuades Simon to switch roles with her for the weekend and Simon spends time with Desiree pretending to be Chance until Desiree tells Simon that she needs to talk to Chance about something in particular. Desiree tells Chance that she is leaving Chance's father Malcolm, who is in a relationship with another woman named Heidi.

Upset, Chance tells Simon about her parents' divorce and reveals that Desiree wants to stay with them for a while. Chance is suspicious when Simon tries to offer some comfort, and he begs again for $200 to pay off some unpaid parking tickets. Though hesitant to loan anyone money because of a bad experience with her first serious boyfriend, Chance agrees to give him the money for playing along with her charade for her mother.

Uncomfortable with the idea of her mother living with her, Chance arranges for Desiree and her to have dinner with Malcolm and Heidi. Chance also invites Rory and, as Chance had hoped, Heidi is immediately smitten with him because she watches the soap opera in which he stars. When Rory manages to get Heidi out of the room, Chance asks her parents about the divorce. Malcolm reveals that Desiree had suggested that they experiment sexually with Heidi, and Desiree felt rejected when Heidi preferred him. Desiree insists that he seduced her, but Malcolm denies it. Malcolm says that while attractions may come and go he loves her.

Chance goes out to a nightclub one night and meets a woman named Sara, who makes sexual advances on her. Chance brings Sara home with her, and after spending a day in bed together, Sara suggests that they take some drugs. Chance refuses and takes the drugs away. Chance leaves her apartment the next morning, and when she returns she finds Simon in her bedroom with Sara, who has apparently overdosed; Chance fears that Sara may have died from the drugs. Simon, overcome with emotion, kisses her and they have sex. Afterward, the two quickly begin to fight about the significance of the sex and Simon leaves the apartment.

The next morning Chance awakes to find Sara, alive, sitting at the kitchen table. She thanks Chance for a place to sleep off the drugs and then leaves. Meanwhile, Simon runs into Jack, who recognizes him from the nightclub. When Simon realizes that Jack is hitting on him, he tells him that Chance has a crush on him and thinks that he is straight. Simon then tells Jack about what had happened the night before and about his frustration and attraction to Chance. Jack tells Simon that, even though he is gay, he sometimes has sex with women because he needs the contact with human beings, and Simon realizes that he needs that human contact too.

Simon returns to Chance's apartment, and Chance is happy to see him, greeting him with a hug. They apologize for their actions and both admit that they are ready to try a relationship.

== Cast ==
- Amber Benson as Chance, a slacker in her 20s.
- James Marsters as Simon, Chance's friend and an unsuccessful telemarketer.
- Christine Estabrook as Desiree, Chance's mother.
- Tressa di Figlia as Sara, a British woman that was first seen in a club who makes sexual advances on Chance.
- Andrew Hallett as Jack, a man whom Chance is attracted to when she was at a night club.
- Rayder Woods as Rory, a struggling actor whom had a one-night stand with Chance.
- Jeff Ricketts as Malcolm, Chance's father.
- Nate Barlow as Milton, a creepy neighbor of Chance.
- Shamus Murphy as Guy, one of Chance's former boyfriends.
- Patrick Beller as The Orderly
- Lara Boyd Rhodes as Heidi, Malcolm's ditzy girlfriend
- Rupert Cole as Johnny
- Jaimie Linn as Rachie
- Grant Langston as The Strolling Minstrel
- David Fury as Pizza Delivery Guy

=== Themes ===
- Chance explores sex and how it functions for different people and in different relationships. Because of a previous bad relationship in which her boyfriend used sex for manipulation, Chance has stripped sex of its meaning. Insecure about his body, Simon shies away from any kind of interaction, so he needs to feel a real connection to a woman to become intimate with her. Jack sees sex as comforting, a way to connect with people.
- The film also plays at reversing gender roles with the male characters—Simon, Rory, Malcolm—needing emotional connection in their sexual relationships, while the female characters experiment sexually and are sexually aggressive, with Chance possessing something of a "get some, get gone" attitude. More obviously Chance and Simon literally switch gender roles for the day when Chance's mother visits.

== Stylistic techniques ==
- Non-linear storytelling -- The film begins with a provocative situation and then goes back in time to show how the situation came to occur.
- Breaking the Fourth Wall -- Both Chance as the narrator and the "strolling minstrel" break the fourth wall by talking or singing directly to the camera.

== Production details ==
- Filming Dates: March–April 2001
- The costume designer Nickolaus Brown also worked on Buffy and borrowed clothes from the wardrobe department. Seth Green wore Simon's "Dragon Inn" T-shirt, which Chance also wears, in the Buffy episode "Harsh Light of Day" and during a photoshoot for some Buffy promotional photos.
- Joss Whedon allowed Benson to shoot on the Buffy set, and all of the club scenes were filmed on the interior and exterior sets for The Bronze.
- This movie reunites Amber Benson and James Marsters with Andy Hallett, whom they worked with before on Mere Smith's The Enforcers.

=== Casting ===
- Much of the cast has some connection to the Buffyverse: Benson and Marsters obviously played prominent characters on Buffy; David Fury was a writer/producer and Rupert Cole was a production assistant on Buffy; Jeff Ricketts guest starred on both Buffy and Angel as a Watchers' Council member; Andy Hallett starred on Angel as Lorne/The Host; Grant Langston guest starred on an episode of Angel; and Tressa di Figlia was married to Buffy cast member Nicholas Brendon.
- In the Behind the Scenes special feature on the Lovers, Liars and Lunatics DVD, Christine Estabrook says that she met Benson at a WB party. (Benson worked on Buffy and Estabrook worked on Nikki, a short-lived WB comedy.) Estabrook approached Benson at the party to tell her how much she liked Benson on Buffy and Benson asked if Estabrook would play her mother in a movie that she had written.

== Shakespeare ==
- When Desiree and Malcolm make up, they recite Shakespeare to each other, specifically a conversation between Hermia and Lysander in Act I, Scene i of A Midsummer Night's Dream.
