= Jack Reed: Badge of Honor =

1993 made-for-television crime drama

- Genre: Crime; Drama
- Written by: Andrew Laskos
- Starring: Brian Dennehy; Susan Ruttan; Alice Krige
- Music by: Lee Holdridge
- Country of origin: United States
- Original language: English

Production
- Executive producers: Tony Etz; Steve Krantz; Brian Dennehy
- Producers: Walter Coblenz; Andrew Laskos; Art Schaefer
- Cinematography: Rick Bota
- Editors: Barry Peters; Noel Rogers
- Running time: 96 minutes
- Production companies: The Kushner-Locke Company; Multimedia Motion Pictures

Original release
- Network: NBC
- Release: November 12, 1993

Jack Reed: Badge of Honor is a 1993 American made-for-television crime drama film written by Andrew Laskos, directed by Kevin Connor starring Brian Dennehy, Susan Ruttan, and Alice Krige. It was the sequel to the 1992 made-for-TV crime drama Deadly Matrimony, continuing the fictional Jack Reed character in a television film series.

== Synopsis ==
Committed to find the killer of a mother, Sgt. Jack Reed (played by Brian Dennehy) finds a trail of lies, corruption and murder.

== Cast ==
- Brian Dennehy as Sergeant Jack Reed
- Susan Ruttan as Arlene Reed
- Alice Krige as Joan Anatole
- R. D. Call as Lieutenant Lloyd Butler
- Amy Aquino as Sharon Hilliard
- Jo Anderson as Wendy Simmons
- Byron Minns
- Neal McDonough
- Justin Burnette as John Reed Jr.
- Michael Talbott as Eddie Dirkson
- Joey Zimmerman as Greg Travis
- Michele Lamar Richards as Molly
- William Sadler as Anatole
- Udo Kier as Giles Marquette
- Amber Benson as Nicole Reed
- Angela Alvarado as Marie Sanchez
- Peter Crook as Ross Dunbar
- Juanita Jennings as Dr. Laura Wheeler
- Barbara Tarbuck as Dora Ferro
- Bruce French as Senator Marik
- Bill Bolender as Stan Howell
- Alan Wilder as Billy
- Kenneth Danziger as Dr. Ben Gregg
- Shane Powers as Nick Marik
- Robert Nadir as Forensic Technician
- Maray Ayres as Ruthie Lambert
- Alan Shearman as District Attorney
- Chuck Hicks as Sergeant Hunter

== Jack Reed series ==
Many sequels were also made with the main role to Brian Dennehy including:

- Jack Reed: A Search for Justice (1994)
- Jack Reed: One of Our Own (1995)
- Jack Reed: A Killer Among Us (1996)
- Jack Reed: Death and Vengeance (1996)
