= David Oren Ward =

American actor (1971–1999)

- Born: July 21, 1971; Washington, D.C., U.S.
- Died: April 2, 1999 (aged 27); Hollywood, Los Angeles, California, U.S.
- Other name: Dave Oren Ward
- Occupation: Actor
- Known for: Pariah; The Killer Eye
- Mother: Barbara Ward

David Oren Ward (July 21, 1971 – April 2, 1999) was an American actor best known for such films and television series as Pariah, Witchouse, The Killer Eye, Pacific Blue and Wind on Water.

== Early life and career ==
Ward was born in Washington, D.C. and later attended college to become a lawyer yet never finished his studies. While living in Florida in 1994 Ward found work as a bartender. After reaching the finals in a modeling competition, Ward took a seminar on acting, starred in a mattress commercial and then in 1995 moved to Los Angeles.

== Media ==
Horror film director David DeCoteau who worked with Ward on the films The Killer Eye and Witchouse said, "We have what we call a movie-star alarm," adding, "When David came in, it was like he had been doing this all his life. He was very confident. There was also an amazing amount of sweetness. He turned every head in the office, and the girls were going crazy."

In 1998, Ward performed on the television series Wind on Water after being chosen by future Glee casting director Robert J. Ulrich for the role. Ulrich said, "He was the epitome of hip," in regards to Ward, also saying, "He was a hustler, edgy. There was just something down and dirty about the guy that made him different from the norm." Ulrich later received a bouquet of flowers from Ward as a show of thanks.

Also in 1998, Ward starred in the neo-Nazi white power skinhead themed film Pariah in the role of Crew, the skinhead gang leader just released from prison, film critic Roger Ebert awarded Pariah three out of four stars.

== Death ==
Ward died in a road rage altercation on the morning of Friday April 2, 1999, in Hollywood, California. Ward was out drinking with two friends, Justin Bowman and Daniel Eppard, at Chateau Marmont and ended up getting in a fight with actor Nathaniel "Nate" Moore best known for the Christina Ricci film Desert Blue. Moore stabbed Ward repeatedly with a martial arts blade and Ward died from his injuries after Eppard and Bowman drove him to Cedars-Sinai Medical Center.

After the trial was delayed for three years while Moore switched lawyers, Moore was eventually sentenced to twelve years for manslaughter in 2002.
