= Ridestore =

Swedish outdoor sports apparel company

Ridestore AB
- Company type: Private
- Industry: Outdoor Sports Apparel
- Founded: 2006; 20 years ago
- Founders: Linus Hellberg and Emil Hellberg
- Headquarters: Gothenburg, Sweden
- Area served: Worldwide
- Products: Snowboard apparel; Ski apparel; Outdoor apparel; Streetwear
- Brands: Ridestore; Dope Snow; Montecwear
- Revenue: 1,160,000,000 Swedish krona (2023)
- Number of employees: 200+
- Website: www.ridestore.com

Ridestore AB is Swedish online retailer specializing in snowboard, ski, and outdoor apparel. Founded in 2006 by brothers Linus and Emil Hellberg, the privately held company is headquartered in Gothenburg, Sweden. Ridestore operates through e-commerce in Europe, North America, Japan, Australia, and New Zealand. The company owns and develops two in-house brands, Dope Snow and Montec.

As of 2023, the company reported annual net sales of approximately SEK 1.16 billion (about €100 million).

== History ==
Ridestore was established in Trollhättan, Sweden in 2006, initially focusing on online sales of imported outdoor apparel. Linus Hellberg started the business from his parents' home, importing American outdoor apparel brands that were not readily available from Swedish online retailers. He left school to focus full-time on Ridestore, and was soon joined by his brother, Emil.

In 2008, Ridestore launched its first in-house brand, Dope Snow. The company expanded its proprietary brand options in 2016 with Montec. By 2017, Ridestore was listed among the top 100 e-commerce companies in Sweden by Internetworld (IDG).

Ridestore then expanded its European presence by localizing websites for multiple markets. In 2020, the company acquired the trademark rights for Dope Snow in the United States and Canada. That same year, Ridestore's German site was named among the Trend Shop 2021 list in the Sports & Outdoor category by Computer Bild, a German technology publication. In 2023, Ridestore received a Market Award in the Sports and Leisure category, presented by the Swedish retail publication Market.

== Brands and operations ==
Ridestore develops and sells its own brands, Dope Snow and Montec, which focus on snowboard and ski apparel respectively. Each brand maintains its own dedicated e-commerce website, through which the products are sold.

The company employs digital marketing approaches, primarily through social media platforms such as Instagram and Facebook. Ridestore utilizes various digital tools including a sizing recommendation system from Fit Analytics to reduce product returns. The company also uses 3D garment visualization software developed by CLO Virtual Fashion to streamline product development and minimize material waste associated with physical prototyping.

In addition to social media marketing and digital advertising, Ridestore collaborates with professional athletes, including sponsoring freestyle skier Jesper Tjäder through its Dope Snow brand.

== Sustainability ==
Ridestore has implemented various sustainability measures, including transitioning from plastic to paper-based packaging. In collaboration with textile recycler Texaid, the company launched Ridestore Renewed, a program for refurbishing and reselling used apparel. Through the program, defective, returned, or unsellable apparel is sorted, refurbished for resale when possible, or redirected to recycling and reuse channels in accordance with environmental standards. According to company reports, Ridestore has sold approximately 11,000 products through the Ridestore Renewed platform.

Since 2023, Ridestore has become a bluesign® system partner, a designation that indicates compliance with safety and environmental standards established for the textile industry.

== Extra Links ==
- www.dopesnow.com
- www.montecwear.com
