= New York City Master Chorale =

- Also known as: NYCMC
- Origin: New York, N.Y., United States
- Genres: choral, classical
- Occupation: Choir
- Instrument: 60 voices
- Years active: 2005-present
- Members: Artistic Director - David Recca; Rehearsal Pianist - Andrea Lodge
- Website: www.nycmasterchorale.org

Official New York City Master Chorale logo

The New York City Master Chorale (NYCMC) is a 60-person non-profit chorus, led by Artistic Director David Recca. NYCMC was founded in 2005 by Dr. Thea Kano, and directed by her until 2019. From 2019 to 2021, the Chorale's Artistic Director and conductor was Dusty Francis. In July 2021, the Chorale announced David Recca as the new Artistic Director with the mission “to connect people through chorale music by presenting high-quality concerts inspired by the distinct energy, diversity, and talent of New York City.”

The Chorale seeks to engage and inspire audiences of all ages, backgrounds, and musical experience by performing a challenging repertoire of traditional and contemporary works, working in collaboration with other artists and organizations who share their vision, and bringing their music into the community through their outreach and education programs. Audience members have commended the warmth and body of the chorale’s tone, and a concert review in Soundview News praised its “poignant elegance.”

Since its premiere at Lincoln Center’s Alice Tully Hall in 2006, the Chorale has expanded its artistic influence, performing two concerts in its most recent season. To date, the New York City Master Chorale has performed at a variety of venues, including Carnegie Hall, Lincoln Center's Avery Fisher Hall, Riverside Church, Church of St. Paul the Apostle and Symphony Space, and has collaborated with both the Park Avenue Symphony and the Astoria Symphony.

Recent repertoire has included Beethoven’s Ninth Symphony, the Mozart Requiem, Rachmaninoff’s Vespers, the Fauré Requiem, Leonard Bernstein’s Chichester Psalms and Morten Lauridsen’s Lux Æterna, along with choral works by American composers including Aaron Copland, Samuel Barber and Randall Thompson, and spirituals by Moses Hogan.

During the 2008–2009 season, the Chorale premiered a new American work for chorus, orchestra and narrator at Lincoln Center. The Journey, composed by Aaron Fruchtman, tells the tale of pioneers moving west on the Oregon Trail. The performance was narrated by Academy Award nominee Bruce Dern. During the 2009 - 2010 season, the Chorale presented the Duruflé Requiem. They also collaborated with the Rock Creek Singers of the Gay Men's Chorus of Washington DC to present the Duruflé Messe Cum Jubilo.

The 2010 - 2011 season was the Chorale's Fifth Anniversary season, during which the Chorale had its European debut, performing the European premiere of Paul Leavitt: Requime at Église Saint-Sulpice. The Chorale also performed at St. Patrick's Cathedral in December 2010. The Chorale celebrated its 10th anniversary in April, 2016 at Alice Tully Hall, Lincoln Center by performing Carmina Burana with new choreography by Gallim Dance.

The New York City Master Chorale also has a commitment to providing outreach to New York City’s public schools and community. In addition to engaging community members through its regular concerts, the Chorale visits partner schools each month throughout the year, exposing more than 400 students per year to choral music. These classroom lessons include conversations with students about the value and role of classical music and providing them with complimentary tickets to the chorale’s concerts. The majority of the students who partake in the program and who attend the concerts have had little to no exposure to classical music.

Additionally, the Chorale performs free concerts at area churches to bring the experience of classical music to local communities. NYCMC is the only New York City area chorus with such outreach programs in its schools and community.
