= U.S. Chaos =

American punk rock band

- U.S. Chaos

Background information
- Origin: New Jersey, United States
- Genres: Punk rock, street punk
- Years active: 1981–1987; 1995–present
- Labels: www.punkrockrecords.com
- Members: Jack Gibson; Rene "U.S. Chaos" Wasted; Glenn "Spikey" Mayer; Allan "Skully" Skolski; Brian "H.C." Daley; Eddie Enzyme
- Past members: Gary Reitmeyer; English Ron; Brian Daley; Eddie Enzyme; Mark BeersBuddy Vern; Matt Brown

U.S. Chaos are an American punk rock band from Paterson, New Jersey, United States, formed in 1981 from remnants of first wave punk outfits The Radicals in 1978 then The Front Line in 1979. They are the first American band to play in an Oi!/street punk style. The band's approach was to play music with lyrics that had an overtly right-wing prose and sense of American patriotism. They often played recordings of military marches and air raid sirens and the infamous George S. Patton speech by George C. Scott before going on stage. U.S. Chaos are considered pioneers and an institution of New Jersey Punk history. The Radicals with Gary Reitmeyer, Glenn "Spikey" Mayer would separate with Alex Kinen, who would later have morphed full circle, to cause the first legitimate hardcore-punk genre split in history, predating all others to form Cause For Alarm and Agnostic Front

== Career ==
U.S. Chaos wrote songs and rehearsed in a basement for months before they played their first concert. In 1981, when their singer English Ron quit, Jack Gibson recruited Alan "Skully" Skolski. In the winter of 1982–1983, U.S. Chaos rehearsed and wrote several songs. In March 1983, they performed for the first time at a party at Aldo's Hideaway in Lyndhurst, New Jersey and many times at CBGB, as well as at City Gardens notably with T.S.O.L, in Trenton, New Jersey. At this time, Freddy L. was their manager.

In 1983, on the first American tour leg with The Exploited and Iron Cross. The lineup at this time was Skolski on vocals, Gibson on bass, Spike Glenn Mayer on drums, Gary Reitmeyer on guitar and Brian Daley (HC) on rhythm guitar. Their first release was the We've Got the Weapons, a vinyl EP released in 1983 that was received with immediate worldwide praise and outrage because of its war-hawkish cartoon graphics and overwhelming professional commercial appearance; that bucked the system of punk and went directly for the throat. It was a punk first. That was created by genius graphic designers Terry Keenan and Mark Jewell. Its production, including recording and printing by Ross Eliss, cost them $5,000, which was unheard of in the American punk scene at the time and drew outrage from locals in New York City, New Jersey and professional music industry types alike.

Their second release was the single Kill the Killers b/w Suicide, which cost almost as much. This was later remastered and released by manager and producer Marty Munsch, from the first pressing disk plates, and re-released by Punk Rock Records as a limited release in 1996. The unreleased singles "Blame it on Sam", "Scum Sucking Pig" and "For Being Young" were both salvaged and remixed by Bob Both and Marty Munsch. These were eventually released by Marty Munsch a few months later as singles We Are Your Enemy and Stopping Evolution Dead In It's [sic] Tracks and are near impossible-to-find collector's pieces, with only a few dozen test pressings in existence.

Later in 1996, U.S. Chaos had the first and only punk records released on a major NY radio station, since the Ramones first album. Their label, Punk Rock Records had an unreleased hard single; "BLAME IT ON SAM" ready to push on WNEW-FM 102.7 FM NY, THE RON AND FEZZ show with 3.5 million listeners. With the infamous debauchery of a half naked intern covered in blue paint-on latex to top it off. Later in 1998, the tracks Suicide and For Being Young were featured in the film Pariah to the tune of three stars given in high regard by the Pulitzer Prize holder for distinguished criticism. Roger Ebert, who claimed that the film, without a doubt, directly influenced the directors of Fight Club.

Reitmeyer's departure from U.S. Chaos meant that the only original member of the band was Skolski. The band changed their name to the Chosen Few and wrote new material. This change coincided with the end of the first wave of US hardcore punk, with many bands changing their sounds or leaving the scene altogether. In 1992, U.S. Chaos reunited to perform at a party. They continued this tradition every year until 1995, when they came fully out of hiatus. Munsch, owner of Punk Rock Records, became their manager. This led to several more releases and a few movie appearances.

From 1996 to 1997, the lineup was Skolsky on vocals, Reitmeyer on guitar, Gibson on bass, and Glenn 'Spikey' Mayer on drums. Mayer was later replaced by Eddie Enzyme (Active Ingredients, Fahrenheit 451, the Pickes). The band continued to play and release new material into 2007, the year Reitmeyer died. Prior to his death, Reitmeyer had recommended Buddy Vern to fill his place. Vern had recently declined a longtime membership and was replaced by Reitmeyer's younger sister, Rene Wasted, an active founding member of Blanks 77.

Marty Munsch later co-engineered and produced a second major release, L.P. for U.S. Chaos,"You Can't Hear A Picture", which gained much attention and critical acclaim from press worldwide that also led to several videos and four more singles. The group will be releasing more material and are currently working from Inner Ear Studios in Arlington, VA and Cloud Factory Studios in Northern NJ

U.S. Chaos resumed their normal performance schedule as of September 15, 2007. The current lineup is Gibson on bass, Skolski on vocals, Mayer on drums and Wasted on guitar.

== Discography ==
- "Were Takin Over Now" (2 Side EP) w "Fear Gods" "Second"CD, songs "Were Takin Over Now", "Panties", "Bad Psychological Profile", "Stormtrooper". Produced by Marty Munsch
- "Stopping Evolution Dead In Its Tracks" - single CD, songs "For Being Young", "Panties" B/w "Stormtrooper" (Punk Rock Records, 2010), produced by Marty Munsch
- We've Got the Weapons EP (1983)
- "Eye For An Eye / Don't Wanna Live" 7" (self-released, 1984 - later reissued by Punk Rock Records/Punk-Core Records)
- U.S. Chaos (2022) Remaster - Eye For An Eye / Don't Wanna Live 7' 1984
- Complete Chaos LP (1996)
- You Can't Hear a Picture LP (Punk rock records/Razorwire E.U. 1997)
- You Can't Hear a Picture LP (Punk Rock Records) U.S. 2001
- We Are Your Enemy - split 7" single with Portland, Oregon's Statch and the Rapes, remixed and mastered by Punk Rock Records, released 1999, Punk Rock Records
- Stopping Evolution Dead In It's [sic] Tracks - produced by Marty Munsch, released 2011, Punk Rock Records

=== Compilation appearances ===
- Stinkbox Records Compilation LP (1996)
- Skins N' Pins CDLP (1996)
- Punk Dwellings: New York's Finest Vol. 1 CD - songs "For Being You" and "Last Call For Alcohol" (Dwell, 1996), prod. Marty Munsch
- No More Heroes: A Tribute to the Stranglers - song "Shut Up" (Elevator Music, 1998)
- Broken Bones And Power Chords Vol. 1: New York's Finest CD - songs "For Being Young", prod. M. Munsch and "Last Call For Alcohol", Prod. M. Munsch. (Crosscheck, 2005)
- A Marty Munsch Production EP (Punkrockrecords SG-63593, 2010, UPC: 846017048228)
- Time To Raise Some Hell EP (Punkrockrecords EMBN: 16734380 2022)

== Filmography ==
- A Current Affair - Fox Network television show (1985), unknown clip, murder case in Washington DC area
- Pariah - Critically acclaimed by Roger Ebert - movie soundtrack, For Being Young, Produced by Marty Munsch performed by U.S. Chaos 1983, 45 single, Don't wanna live (suicide), 2001, movie, soundtrack, inclusion Punk Rock Records (1996)
- Punk's Not Dead - movie soundtrack inclusion (2006) (Susan Dyner)
- All Grown Up the Movie- documentary movie soundtrack, full inclusion, lengthy interview (2006) (Andrea Witting)
- Love and Bullets - movie soundtrack inclusion (1999) (Matthew Brown)

== Members ==
- 1982 Gary Reitmeyer guitar, Brian "HC" Daley guitar, Jack bass, Glenn "Spikey" Mayer drums, English Ron vocals
- 1982 Reitmeyer guitar, Brian "HC" Daley guitar, Jack Gibson bass, Gene drums, Allan "Skully" Skolsky vocals
- 1983 Reitmeyer guitar, Brian "HC" Daley guitar, Jack Gibson bass, Glenn "Spikey" Mayer drums, Allan "Skully" Skolsky vocals
- 1984 Reitmeyer guitar, Jack Gibson bass, Glenn "Spikey" Mayer drums, Allan "Skully" Skolsky vocals
- 1984 Reitmeyer guitar, Brian "HC" Daley guitar, Jack Gibson bass, Glenn "Spikey" Mayer drums, Allan "Skully" Skolsky vocals
- 1984-85 Steve "Hot Shot" guitar, Jack Gibson bass, Glenn "Spikey" Mayer drums, Allan "Skully" Skolsky vocals
- 1985 Reitmeyer guitar, Steve "Hot Shot" guitar, Jack Gibson bass, Eddie Enzyme drums, Allan "Skully" Skolsky vocals
- 1986 Reitmeyer guitar, Mark Beer guitar, Jack Gibson bass, Eddie Enzyme drums, Allan "Skully" Skolsky vocals
- 1986 Reitmeyer guitar, Mark Beer guitar, Jack Gibson Bass, Jade drums, Allan "Skully" Skolsky vocals
- 1987 Mark Beer guitar, Reitmeyer guitar, Tim Taylor bass, Jade drums, Allan "Skully" Skolsky vocals
- 1996 Allan "Skully" Skolsky vocals, Reitmeyer guitar, Brian H.C. Daley guitar, Jack Gibson bass, Glenn "Spikey" Mayer drums
- 1997 Allan "Skully" Skolsky vocals, Reitmeyer guitar, Jack Gibson bass, Eddie Enzyme drums
- 2007 Allan "Skully" Skolsky vocals, Rene Wasted guitar, Jack Gibson bass, Glenn "Spikey" Mayer, Eddie Enzyme drums
- 2011 Allan "Skully" Skolsky vocals, Rene Wasted guitar, Jack Gibson bass, Glenn "Spikey" Mayer drums
- 2017 Allan "Skully" Skolsky vocals, Rene Wasted guitar, Jack Gibson bass, Glenn "Spikey" Mayer drums
- 2022 Allan "Skully" Skolsky Vocals, Rene Wasted guitar, Brian "HC" Daley guitar, Mike "HK" Guitar, Jack bass, Glenn "Spikey" Mayer drums, Eddie Enzyme drums

=== Management members ===
- Freddy L. - manager during first incarnation
- Marty Munsch - band manager 1995–Present
- Matthew Brown - drummer for Dysfunctional Youth; filled in on drums while drummer Eddie Enzyme recovered from a work injury

== Bibliography ==
- The Encyclopedia of Punk Rock (Brian Cogan), Paperback, Sterling; illustrated edition (November 9, 2008), English, ISBN 1-4027-5960-6, ISBN 978-1-4027-5960-4. p. 347
