= A Bug and a Bag of Weed =

- Film poster
- Directed by: David Gonella
- Written by: Chris Cuthbertson
- Produced by: Anita McGee; Chris Cuthbertson; Drew Hagen; Nico Lorenzutti; Michael P. Mason
- Starring: Sebastian Spence; Chris Cuthbertson; Drew Hagen; Nico Lorenzutti; Laura Kohoot; Amy Kerr; Nigel Bennett; Ryan Scott Greene; Christopher Shyer
- Cinematography: David Bercovici-Artieda
- Edited by: Michael P. Mason
- Distributed by: Domino Films, IFC, Showcase Television
- Release date: 2006
- Running time: 96 minutes
- Country: Canada
- Language: English
- Budget: US$500,000

A Bug and a Bag of Weed is a 2006 comedy film directed by David Gonella and starring Sebastian Spence, Chris Cuthbertson, and Drew Hagen.

== Plot ==
Peter Jordan is 31 years old, $35,000 in debt, and he's been working at Super Duper Computers for seven long years. Together with his equally down-on-their-luck co-workers Stan and Willie, Peter dreams of escaping the daily drudgery of "don't forget to sell the extended warranty", and "if you have time to lean, you have time to clean". Peter's existence in Big Box Retail Commission hell is further fueled by rival Salesman Rommel who steals Peter's customers and computer sales behind his back. Just when things seem to be at their worst, Peter's long lost high school buddy Frehley blows into town and turns Peter, Stan and Willie's humdrum lives into a non-stop beer-soaked party, full of loud music, strip clubs, and beautiful girls! And with Frehley yelling "You only live once!", Peter whips out the credit cards to buy his dream car, a classic Volkswagen Beetle. But when Frehley suddenly splits town, straight-laced Peter and his buddies are shocked to find themselves left with a massive hockey bag stuffed full of primo weed.

== Cast ==
- Sebastian Spence as Frehley
- Chris Cuthbertson as Peter Jordan
- Drew Hagen as Stan Stanley
- Nico Lorenzutti as Willie Gopher
- Laura Kohoot as Amanda
- Christopher Shyer as Rommel
- Nigel Bennett as Henry Tyler
- John Dunsworth as Geoff
- Ryan Scott Greene as Marcel
- Amy Kerr as Mandy
- George Green
- Shawn Duggan
- Ian Tench
- Mary Colin Chisolm
- David Flemming
- Renee Abott
- Veronica Reynolds
- Chase Duffy
- Amelia Curran
- Bill Carr

== Production and release ==
In a 2003 announcement with Playback, Jason Priestly, Bif Naked, Robb Wells, and John Paul Tremblay were originally slated to star in the film, which was also to have a budget of one million dollars and was to screen at the Atlantic Film Festival in 2003. Filming for A Bug and a Bag of Weed was postponed until May 24 - June 11, 2005, which took place in Halifax, Nova Scotia minus the aforementioned actors and on a budget of $500,000. The film screened at the 2006 Atlantic Film Festival on September 22.

== Soundtrack ==
The Soundtrack features music from The Kings, Russell Webb, Bob Melanson, Shocore, Crush, By Divine Right, Amelia Curran, JANA JANA, Jagged, King Konqueror, Jonathan Andrews, Obscura, Dark Armpit, Spesh K, Paul MacCuish, Fresh Little Candies, Laura Kohoot, Gone Twenty-One, A/V, Motion Soundtrack, Tuuli and The Honey Brothers.

== Reception ==
In his book Shooting from the East: Filmmaking on the Canadian Atlantic, Darrell Varga criticized A Bug and a Bag of Weed and compared it negatively to the film Touch and Go, calling the plot "ridiculous" and "a faux-transgressive pot plot rolled in sit-com paper".
