= American Siege =

2022 American film by Edward Drake

- Theatrical release poster
- Directed by: Edward Drake
- Screenplay by: Edward Drake
- Story by: Corey Large; Edward Drake
- Produced by: Corey Large
- Starring: Timothy V. Murphy; Bruce Willis; Rob Gough; Johann Urb; Anna Hindman; Johnny Messner; Cullen G. Chambers; Janet Jones
- Cinematography: Laffrey Witbrod
- Edited by: Justin Williams
- Music by: Scott Currie
- Production company: 308 Enterprise
- Distributed by: Shout! Studios
- Release date: January 7, 2022
- Running time: 90 minutes
- Country: United States
- Language: English
- Budget: $10 million
- Box office: $121,967

American Siege is a 2022 American action film written and directed by Edward Drake. It stars Timothy V. Murphy, Bruce Willis, Rob Gough, Johann Urb, Anna Hindman, Johnny Messner, Cullen G. Chambers, and Janet Jones. The film was released by Shout! Studios on January 7, 2022. American Siege was panned by critics.

== Premise ==
A sheriff is put in charge of taking down a gang of thieves who have taken a wealthy doctor hostage.

== Cast ==
- Bruce Willis as Ben Watts
- Rob Gough as Roy Lambert
- Timothy V. Murphy as Charles Rutledge
- Johann Urb as Toby Baker
- Anna Hindman as Grace Baker
- Johnny Messner as Silas
- Cullen G. Chambers as John Keats
- Janet Jones as Marisa Lewis
- Trevor Gretzky as Kyle Rutledge
- Sarah May Sommers as Brigit Baker

== Production ==
Principal photography for American Siege began on November 10, 2020. Notable filming locations included Fitzgerald, Georgia, Bellingham, Washington, and Victoria, British Columbia. Shot on a $10 million production budget, filming concluded on December 1, 2020. Shout! Studios acquired the North American distribution rights for the film.

It was possible that in this movie Bruce Willis required a lot of assistance with his role as in later years it was revealed he was suffering from the effects of Frontal-Temporal Dementia, he would have lines spoken to him through an earpiece and he didn't move from place to place so much.

== Release ==
The film was released in theaters and on demand by Shout! Studios on January 7, 2022.

=== Box office ===
As of August 27, 2022, American Siege grossed $121,967 in the United Arab Emirates, Portugal, Russia, and South Korea, against a budget of $10 million.

=== Critical reception ===
On the review aggregator website Rotten Tomatoes, 8% of 13 critics' reviews are positive, with an average rating of 3.8/10.

== Accolades ==
Bruce Willis was nominated for his performance in this movie, as he was for all movies he appeared in, in 2021, in the category Worst Performance by Bruce Willis in a 2021 Movie at the Golden Raspberry Awards. The category was later rescinded after he announced his retirement due to aphasia.
