= Witchouse =

- DVD cover
- Directed by: David DeCoteau (as Jack Reed)
- Screenplay by: Matthew Jason Walsh
- Story by: Charles Band
- Produced by: Kirk Edward Hansen; Vlad Panescu
- Starring: Matt Raftery; Monica Serene Garnich; Ariauna Albright; Brooke Mueller; Ashley McKinney; Dave Oren Ward; Dane Northcutt
- Cinematography: Gabriel Kosuth
- Edited by: Harry James Picardi
- Music by: Jared DePasquale
- Production companies: Castel Film Romania; Full Moon Pictures
- Distributed by: Full Moon Entertainment
- Release date: June 22, 1999 (United States)
- Running time: 72 minutes
- Countries: United States; Romania
- Language: English

Witchouse is a 1999 supernatural horror film directed by David DeCoteau, credited as Jack Reed, and stars Matt Raftery, Monica Serene Garnich, Ariauna Albright, Brooke Mueller, Ashley McKinney, Dave Oren Ward, and Dane Northcutt. It was released by Full Moon Features. The film has received mainly negative reviews. The independent film was followed by two sequels, Witchouse 2: Blood Coven and Witchouse 3: Demon Fire. The film is dedicated to Dave Oren Ward who was murdered in Los Angeles on April 7, 1999.

== Synopsis ==
On May Day 1998, in Dunwich, Massachusetts, Elizabeth gathers together a group of specially selected friends for a rather odd party. It turns out that she is the descendant of a malevolent witch named Lilith who was burned at the stake precisely three hundred years ago. Now Elizabeth hopes to resurrect her dreadful ancestor and has a specific (and murderous) need for the guests she has chosen.

== Cast ==
- Ariauna Albright as Lilith LaFey
- Matt Raftery as Jack Smith
- Monica Serene Garnich as Jennifer
- Ashley McKinney as Elizabeth LaFey
- Brooke Mueller as Janet
- Dave Oren Ward as Tony
- Dane Northcutt as Scott
- Marissa Tait as Maria
- Ryan Scott Greene as Brad
- Jason Faunt as Bob
- Kimberly Pullis as Margaret
- Roy Dallas as Kit

== Production ==
=== Development ===
Neal Marshall Stevens wrote the original script under the pseudonym Benjamin Carr for Full Moon Entertainment. The studio rejected Stevens' screenplay in favor for a film more akin to Night of the Demons, but would later repurpose it for the 2001 film Stitches.

=== Filming ===
Production began in Romania with David Decoteau serving as director.

== Release ==
Witchouse was released on June 22, 1999 by Full Moon Entertainment.

=== Home media ===
The studio released the film on VHS on June 22, 1999 and later DVD on July 28, 1999.

== Reception ==
On review aggregator Rotten Tomatoes, Witchouse has one negative review. They have stated that the film is Full Moon Features' knockoff of Night of the Demons, because the whole vibe feels like it, and Lilith 'looks like Angela after she's possessed'. Rotten Tomatoes gave it 15% while IMDb gave it 3.8/10.

== See also ==
- List of films about witchcraft
