= Brooke Mueller =

American actress (born 1977)

- Born: Brooke Jaye Mueller; August 19, 1977 (age 49); Ellenville, New York, U.S.
- Occupation: Actress
- Years active: 1998–2011, 2021
- Spouse: Charlie Sheen (m. 2008; div. 2011)
- Children: 2

Brooke Jaye Mueller (born August 19, 1977) is an American retired actress. She acted in films and worked as special correspondent on Extra. In 2008, Mueller married actor Charlie Sheen, with whom she shares twin sons. They divorced in 2011. Mueller has had a longterm struggle with substance abuse.

== Early life ==
Mueller was born and raised in upstate New York. Her father, Allen Mueller, worked as a Miami and Key West police officer, a high school teacher, and a real-estate broker. He died in a motorcycle accident when Brooke was twelve. Her father was Lutheran, and her mother Moira Fiore was Jewish. When she was 14, her mother married Florida-based millionaire Kenneth Wolofsky and moved to Florida. Mueller was a cheerleader at the Benjamin School in North Palm Beach. Mueller has a brother, Scott Allen Mueller, and a half-sister, Sydney Wolofsky.

== Career ==
Mueller has acted in film and worked as special correspondent on Extra. Her best known role was as Janet in the 1999 direct-to-video film Witchouse, credited as Brooke Allen. She also played Cassandra in the 2008 comedy film Strictly Sexual (also credited as Brooke Allen). In 2011, Mueller co-starred in The World According to Paris, a reality show alongside her friend Paris Hilton. She has also worked as real estate investor, including purchasing a home from Mel B in 2012, refurbishing it and reselling it nine months later for a $500,000 profit. She had also bought and flipped homes in the Los Angeles area neighborhoods Nichols Canyon (2005) and Los Feliz (2009).

== Personal life ==
On May 30, 2008, Mueller married actor Charlie Sheen, having been engaged since 2007. The couple were introduced in 2006 by mutual friend Rebecca Gayheart. Mueller gave birth to their twin sons on March 14, 2009. On December 25, 2009, Sheen was arrested on suspicion of domestic abuse. The couple filed for divorce in November 2010. In March 2011, police removed the children from Sheen's home after Mueller obtained a restraining order against Sheen. The divorce settlement – with Sheen paying her $750,000 per their prenuptial agreement, plus $55,000 per month in child support for their two sons – was approved by a Los Angeles Superior Court judge and became effective on May 2, 2011. Mueller and Sheen maintained a friendship afterwards.

In 1996, Mueller was arrested on DUI charges in Palm Beach County, Florida. In March 2001, she was arrested in Miami-Dade County, Florida, for cocaine possession. In July 2011, Mueller completed an outpatient rehab program. In May 2013, officials from Department of Children and Family Services removed Mueller's then 4-year-old children from her care, when her suspected ongoing drug use made the house unsafe for them. Mueller entered a rehab program soon after, while her sons were initially placed in the care of Denise Richards, Sheen's second ex-wife, and later transferred to the care of Mueller's brother Scott. In December 2014, full custody of her then 5-year-old sons was returned to Mueller by the court. Mueller walked barefoot into a bar with her sons and a nanny on the morning of November 16, 2016, and was taken to a hospital for evaluation.

In August 2019, Mueller voluntarily entered an inpatient trauma rehabilitation center, in a renewed effort to deal with her substance abuse problems, with her then 10-year-old sons going into the care of Mueller's parents.

Mueller relapsed in the summer of 2023 after six years of sobriety. Muller says she classifies herself as a "stage four addict," meaning she is in a "cycle where you just have these relapses, no matter how well you get, and no matter how many years, it's just a matter of time."

== Filmography ==
Television and film roles
Year	Title	Role	Notes
1998	USA High	Girl	Episode: "Lights, Camera, Jackson"
1999	Witchouse	Janet	Independent film
2004	A Love Song for Bobby Long	Sandy	Uncredited
2008	Strictly Sexual	Cassandra	Credited as Brooke Allen
2011	Charlie Sheen: Bad Boy on the Edge	Herself	Television documentary
2011	The World According to Paris	Herself	6 episodes
2021	Super Heroes: The Movie	Luvinterest	Film
2025	aka Charlie Sheen	Herself	Documentary
