= Rob Gough =

American actor, entrepreneur and sports card collector

- Born: Indiana, U.S.
- Occupations: Entrepreneur, actor, sports memorabilia collector
- Years active: 2000s–present
- Known for: Bidaroo; Eckim; DOPE
- Spouse: Cassie Gough

Rob Gough is an American actor, entrepreneur and sports memorabilia collector. He was a lead in the film American Siege (2021) along with Bruce Willis. In 2021, Gough purchased a 1952 Topps Mickey Mantle baseball card for $5.2 million.

== Early life and health ==
Gough was raised in Indiana. When he was a teenager and a college student at Ball State University, he was diagnosed with bone cancer and underwent chemotherapy. He earned a degree in Business with a focus on Marketing from the Kelley School of Business.

== Career ==
In 2002, Gough launched his first business, Bidaroo, a penny auction website that later sponsored an entry in the Indianapolis 500.

In 2012, he co‑founded Eckim, a company that operated coupon and deal websites. He served as president of the company until its sale to Quotient Technology in 2014. In 2015, Gough engaged in private investing activities. In May 2014, he was profiled by The New York Times. In 2017, Gough acquired the Los Angeles–based streetwear brand Dope Couture.

In 2026, Gough acquired the professional Jai-alai team Miami Fireballs from the World Jai-Alai League, converting it to a perpetual, owner-held franchise intended to attract long-term investment and support the league's commercial development.

== Sports memorabilia ==
In January 2021, Gough acquired a 1952 Topps Mickey Mantle baseball card for US$5.2 million. The purchase was reported as setting a record price for a sports card. In 2023, Gough purchased the jersey worn by Wayne Gretzky during the game at Madison Square Garden on April 18, 1999, in which he recorded the 2,857th and final point of his National Hockey League (NHL) career. The jersey sold at auction for $715,120.

== Personal life ==
Gough has spoken publicly about surviving cancer and has described the experience as formative to his professional and personal ambitions. He lived in Los Angeles with his fiancée, Cassie, and participated in charitable activities, including fundraisers for local wish‑granting organizations in Indiana.
