= Jared DePasquale =

American film, television and audio drama composer

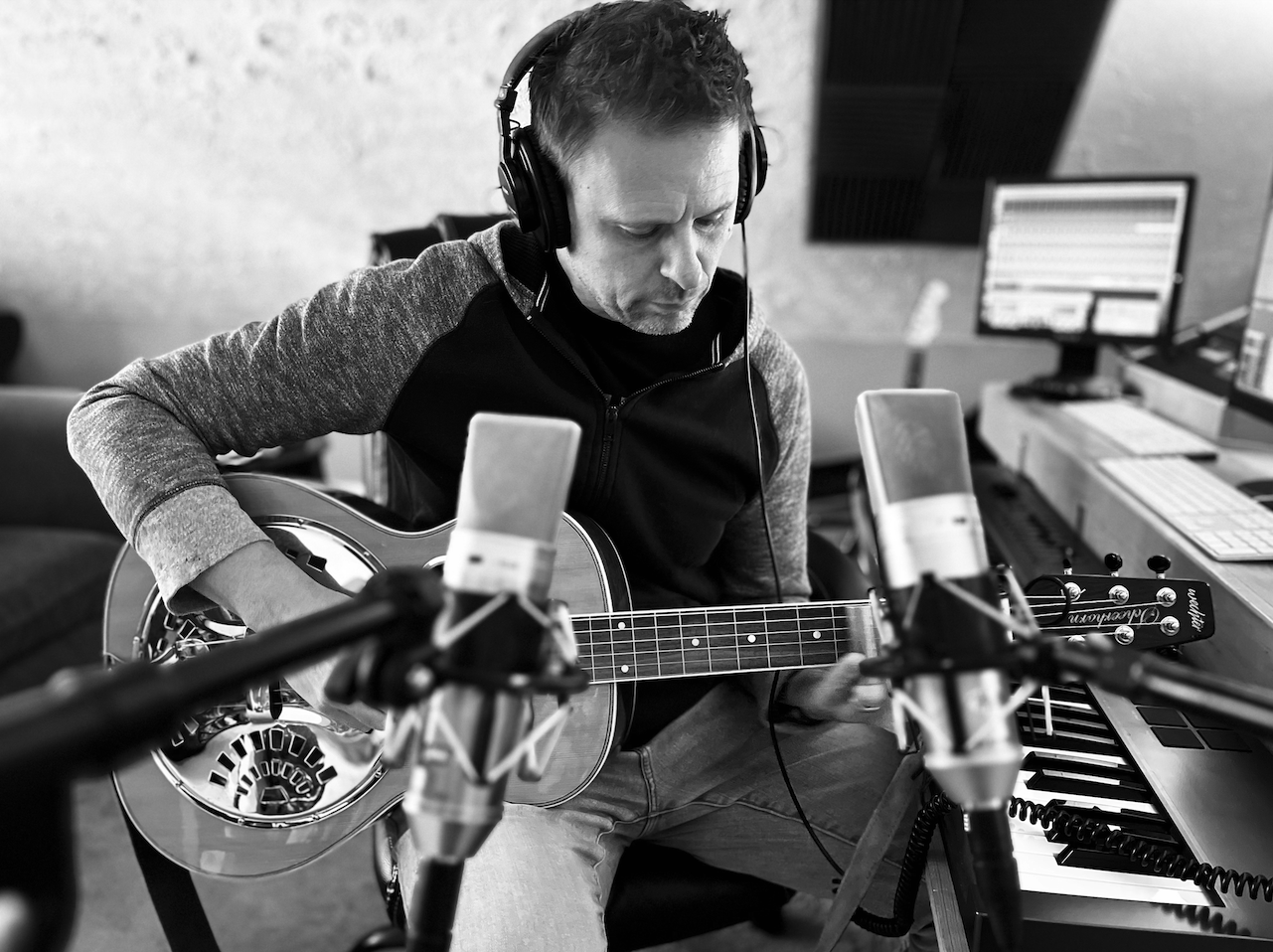
- Born: June 1, 1971 (age 55); New York
- Education: Duquesne University
- Known for: Composer

Jared DePasquale (born June 1, 1971) is an American film, television, and audio drama composer. He resides in Nashville, Tennessee.

== Education and early career ==
Born in Manhasset, New York, DePasquale earned a bachelor of music in guitar performance with an emphasis in composition from Duquesne University. Upon graduation, DePasquale chose to accept an apprenticeship opportunity with Emmy Award-winning composer Joseph LoDuca rather than continuing his education at the University of Southern California's Film Scoring Department where he had been accepted. During his tenure with LoDuca, DePasquale learned the business of writing music to picture and working with live orchestras on projects that included Xena: The Warrior Princess, Hercules: The Legendary Journeys, and American Gothic.

== Composition career ==
DePasquale's first full-length feature film was Full Moon Features' Witchouse, directed by David DeCoteau, and released in 1999. Witchouse was the first of a series of films DePasquale would go on to score for DeCoteau, including Ancient Evil: Scream of the Mummy and The Frightening. Rue Morgue, Fangoria, and Cinescape positively reviewed DePasquale's scores for their innovation and high quality.

In 2000, DePasquale began working with Dave Arnold and Paul McCusker of Focus on the Family and scored a series of audio dramas adaptations, including The Secret Garden, Les Miserables, Little Women, At the Back of the North Wind, and The Hiding Place as well as several episodes of Adventures in Odyssey. In 2006, At the Back of the North Wind won an Audie Award through the Audio Publishers Association for "Achievement in Production," which includes the music score, sound design, and sound mix.

In a 2003 interview with Cinescape Magazine, DePasquale discussed his transition away from the horror genre by saying, "I love the challenges that each style of music brings, and I love to solve those challenges. About a year ago, however, I made a choice to not take projects that don't somehow bring something positive into our world. That doesn't rule out horror films altogether, but it does rule out many of them."

In 2004, DePasquale was featured in Music from the Movies as one of the three most promising and interesting talents among film composers today.

DePasquale's work with Arnold and McCusker has also included a series of audio dramas produced by the Augustine Institute and its AIR Theatre, including Brother Francis: The Barefoot Saint of Asisi, The Trials of Saint Patrick, and Ode to Saint Cecilia. The score for Brother Francis won "Best Score for an Audio Drama" through Audio Theatre Central and both Brother Francis and The Trials of Saint Patrick was selected as finalists for the 2018 Audie Awards "Audio Drama of the Year" by the Audio Publishers Association.

In late 2015, DePasquale began working with writer and director Ian Bultman of The Brinkman Adventures when Audio Theatre Central's JD Sutter suggested DePasquale could be a good fit for the show. DePasquale would go on to score multiple episodes in Seasons 4 through 6, and then become the lead composer beginning in Season 7. In early 2020, before the pandemic began, Bultman contacted DePasquale about scoring Freedom: William Bradford and the American Pilgrims, an eleven part drama he had been writing and researching for years. The show was delayed due to the challenges of recording actors, and DePasquale began scoring the drama in late 2020 and finishing it in late 2021. The drama won three Seneca Awards in 2022 for best score, best cover art, and audio drama of the year.

== Awards ==
DePasquale is the recipient of multiple honors and awards. He is the only person, regardless of award category, to have won three consecutive Seneca Awards.

- 2022: Freedom: William Bradford and the American Pilgrims, Brinkman Adventures, Beachglass Ministries: Won for "Best Original Score" by the ATC Seneca Awards.
- 2021: Freedom: William Bradford and the American Pilgrims, Brinkman Adventures, Beachglass Ministries: Nominated / Notable Mention for "Original Score for Other Media" by REEL MUSIC.
- 2019: The Legends of Robin Hood, AIR Theatre: Won for "Best Score for an Audio Drama" by the ATC Seneca Awards.
- 2018: The Adventum, Volume 1, Wise King Media: Won for "Best Score for an Audio Drama" by the ATC Seneca Awards.
- 2017: The Trials of Saint Patrick, AIR Theatre: Won for "Best Score for an Audio Drama" by the ATC Seneca Awards.
- 2017: The Trials of Saint Patrick, AIR Theatre: Nominated for "Audio Drama of the Year / Historical Non-Fiction" by the Audio Publishers Association.
- 2017: Brother Francis, The Barefoot Saint of Assisi, AIR Theatre: Nominated for "Audio Drama of the Year" by Audio Publishers Association.
- 2017: Les Miserables, Focus on the Family: Placed in the Top 5 for "Best Score, New Archival (Digital) Release by REEL MUSIC.
- 2016: Brother Francis, the Barefoot Saint of Assisi, AIR Theatre: Won, "Best Score for an Audio Drama" by Audio Theatre Central.
- 2015: The Hiding Place, Focus on the Family: Won "Best Score – Other Media" by REEL MUSIC.
- 2006: At the Back of the North Wind, Focus on the Family: Won, "Achievement in Production" by Audio Publishers Association.
- 2006: The Hiding Place, Focus on the Family: Nominated for "Audio Drama of the Year" by Audio Publishers Association.
- 2006: The Hiding Place, Focus on the Family: Nominated for "Achievement in Production" by Audio Publishers Association.
- 2005: Little Women, Focus on the Family: Nominated for "Achievement in Production" by the Audio Publishers Association.
