= Johann Urb =

Estonian-American actor

- Born: 24 January 1977 (age 49); Tallinn, then part of Estonian SSR, Soviet Union
- Occupations: Actor; model
- Years active: 2001–present
- Spouses: Erin Axtell (m. 2007; div. 2010) Rachel Emma Pringle (m. 2018)

Johann Urb (born 24 January 1977) is an Estonian-American actor and former model.

== Early life and education ==
Johann Urb was born in Tallinn to parents Tarmo and Maris Urb. His father is a musician and the brother of actor and singer Toomas Urb. At the age of ten, he moved to live in Finland with his mother and her new Finnish husband, where he was raised primarily in Tampere. After turning 17, Urb moved to the United States, where his father lived, and began his career in modeling in New York City, which led him later on to pursuing a career in acting. He studied drama at the Lee Strasberg Theatre and Film Institute.

== Career ==
In 2001, Urb landed a small part in the film Zoolander. Later, he made an appearance in the short film Fear of Feathers and had a role in one episode of CSI: Miami. In 2004, Urb appeared in the short-running television series The Mountain. Following that, he guest starred in several television shows and made smaller film roles.

Urb would then get his first major film role in The Hottie and the Nottie in 2008. The next year, Urb made a short appearance in Roland Emmerich's disaster epic 2012 as a heroic pilot, and he played a journalist in the fantasy TV series Eastwick. He also played the part of Leon S. Kennedy in Resident Evil: Retribution, which was released in 2012. He also played the part of U.S. Park Ranger Burt Moore, the boyfriend of Abby Sciuto in the series NCIS.

He is also a couples coach with his wife Rachel Pringle Urb.

== Filmography ==
=== Film ===
Year	Title	Role	Notes
2001	Zoolander	Mugatu's bodyguard	
2003	Fear of Feathers	Hunk	Short film
2006	All In	Jake	
2006	Life Happens	Jason	Short film
2007	The Bank Job	Brandon	Direct-to-video
2007	1408	Surfer dude	
2008	The Hottie and the Nottie	Johann Wulrich	
2008	Strictly Sexual	Joe Santarella	
2008	Toxic	Greg	Direct-to-video
2009	Hired Gun	Ryan Decker	
2009	2012	Sasha Hoho	
2010	Hard Breakers	Zack	
2011	A Little Bit of Heaven	Doug	Uncredited
2011	Hot Dog Water	Sexy guy	Short film
2011	Small Gods	Owen Young	Short film
2011	Dorfman in Love	Jay Cleary	
2012	Resident Evil: Retribution	Leon S. Kennedy	
2014	Rusty Steel	Rusty	Direct-to-video
2014	Beautiful Girl	Cannon Balls	Also producer
2014	Faith	Arseni	Short film
2015	Check, Please!	Vincent Chase	Short film
2015	The Last Rescue	Feldgendarm Hans Graf	
2016	The Perfect Daughter	Nick	
2016	Lord of Shanghai	Jensen	
2016	Happy Hour	Marcus	Short film
2017	Hollywood Dirt	Cole	
2018	Tuliliilia	Kaarel	English-language title: Fire Lily. Estonian feature film
2018	Straight Talk Express	Lance Evver	Short film
2018	Can't Have You	Zeus	
2019	Ükssarvik	Tom Marcusson	English-language title: Chasing Unicorns. Estonian feature film
2019	Stay with Me	Josh	
2020	The Deep Ones	Petri	
2020	Breach	Shady	
2022	American Siege	Toby Baker	
2022	Functional Chaos	Gilroy	Short film

=== Television ===
Year	Title	Role	Notes
2003	Miss Match	David	Episode: "Who's Your Daddy?"
2004	CSI: Miami	Brad Tustin	Episode: "Stalkerazzi"
2004	The Mountain	Travis Thorson	Main cast; 13 episodes
2005	Love's Long Journey	Fyn Anders	Television film
2006	Entourage	Ken	Episode: "Vegas Baby, Vegas!"
2006	The Minor Accomplishments of Jackie Woodman	Doug	2 episodes
2006	'Til Death	Greg	Episode: "The Wood Pile"
2007	Dirt	Johnny Gage	5 episodes
2007	Hidden Palms	Steve	Episode: "Dangerous Liaisons"
2008	One Tree Hill	Nick	Episode: "4 Years, 6 Months, 2 Days"
2008	A Gunfighter's Pledge	Lars Anderson	Television film
2008	Knight Rider	Skyler Rand	Episode: "Knight of the Iguana"
2009–2010	Eastwick	Will St. David	Main cast; 10 episodes
2010	100 Questions	Cade	Episode: "Have You Ever Had a One-Night Stand?"
2011	Strictly Sexual: The Series	Joe Brandon	Main cast; 6 episodes
2011	The Glades	Kyle Wheeler	Episode: "Beached"
2013	CSI: NY	Grant Holliston	Episode: "Nine Thirteen"
2013	Californication	Robbie Mac	3 episodes
2013	Family Guy	The Ambassador	Voice; episode: "12 and a Half Angry Men"
2014	NCIS	Burt Moore	2 episodes
2015	Agent X	Dante Kane	Episode: "Angels & Demons"
2016	Royal Pains	Dr. Hans deGroot	Episode: "Doubt of Africa"
2017	Our Bnb Life	Josh	
2017	Scorpion	Eerik	Episode: "Rock Block"
2017	Casual	Hans	Episode: "Ashes to Ashes"
2017	Arrow	Vincent Sobel / Vigilante	5 episodes
2019	Pandora	Captain Jaworski	2 episodes
2022	The Lincoln Lawyer	Jan Rilz	2 episodes
