= Christine Estabrook =

American actress (born 1952)

- Born: Mary Christine Estabrook c. 1952
- Education: State University of New York, Oswego (BA); Yale University (MFA)
- Years active: 1975–present
- Spouse: Vic Polizos

Christine Estabrook (born Mary Christine Estabrook; c. 1952) is an American actress, known for her roles on the television series The Crew, Nikki, Desperate Housewives, and American Horror Story; she had a recurring role on the drama Mad Men during the show's fifth, sixth, and seventh seasons. Estabrook has received an Obie Award and Drama Desk Award.

== Early life ==
Estabrook was born to Julianne Shed. She graduated from East Aurora High Schoolin 1968 and from the Yale Drama School. She has three brothers and one sister.

== Career ==
At the O'Neill National Playwrights Conference, she created the role of the young daughter in Kevin O'Morrison's Ladyhouse Blues, which then moved to off-Broadway. On Broadway, she was in The Inspector General and Andrei Șerban's production of The Cherry Orchard. She won an Obie Award for her off-Broadway performance in Deborah Eisenberg's Pastorale, at the Second Stage Theater. She created the role of Helen opposite William H. Macy in Durang's Baby with the Bathwater at Playwrights Horizons. On Broadway, she took over the role of Feni in Wendy Wasserstein's The Sisters Rosensweig. In the fall of 2006, she returned to Broadway in the musical Spring Awakening, playing all the adult female roles.

Since the 1990s, she has mostly done TV and movies, the latter including include Second Sight, Sea of Love, Presumed Innocent, and Spider-Man 2.

She had a recurring role on the ABC television series, Desperate Housewives playing Martha Huber, the widowed, nosy neighbor of the street. Her other appearances include a 2002 episode of the HBO series, Six Feet Under, wherein she played Emily Previn, a woman who died alone without any family or friends. The episode sparked much discussion in the following days about the character's death. Estabrook has also guest-starred on 7th Heaven, Dharma & Greg, The Guardian, Veronica Mars, and NYPD Blue. In 2009, she guest-starred in two episodes of the CBS drama Ghost Whisperer as Evelyn James, Eli's mom.

In 2011, she appeared on the first season of FX series Murder House as Marcy. She later appeared in a recurring role in the AMC cable-television series Mad Men, playing Joan Harris' mother, Gail Holloway.

== Personal life ==
Estabrook married actor Vic Polizos, and she has two stepchildren.

== Filmography ==
=== Film ===
Year	Title	Role	Notes
1979	The Bell Jar	Student editor	
1982	The Wall	Rutka	
1984	The Lost Honor of Kathryn Beck	Janet Reiss	Television movie
1985	Almost You	Maggie	
1989	Sea of Love	Gina Gallagher	
1989	Second Sight	Priscilla Pickett	
1990	Presumed Innocent	Lydia MacDougall	
1991	One Special Victory	Ruthie	Television movie
1995	The Usual Suspects	Dr. Plummer	
1995	Kidnapped: In the Line of Duty	—N/a	Television movie
1996	Special Report: Journey to Mars	—N/a	Television movie
1997	Murder Live!	Dr. Christine Winter	Television movie
2002	Chance	Desiree	
2003	Living in Walter's World	Robin	Short film
2003	Grind	Sarah Jensen	
2004	Catch That Kid	Sharon	
2004	Spider-Man 2	Mrs. Jameson	
2006	Lovers, Liars & Lunatics	Elaine Rayne	
2008	Meet Marker	Mom	
2010	Backyard Wedding	Joanne Blake	Television movie
2016	Is That a Gun in Your Pocket?	Shirley Parsons	

=== Television ===
Year	Title	Role	Notes
1984	George Washington	Abigail Adams	3 episodes
1985	Hometown	Jane Parnell	9 episodes
1987	Tales from the Darkside	Irene	Episode: "The Enormous Radio"
1990	L.A. Law	Susan Parral	Episode: "Blood, Sweat and Fears"
1993	Frasier	Lou	Episode: "Miracle on Third or Fourth Street"
1994	The X-Files	Agent Henderson	Episode: "Young at Heart"
1995	Cybill	Patty	Episode: "The Replacements"
1995–96	The Crew	Lenora Zwick	21 episodes
1997	The Practice	Judge Maureen Zisk	Episode: "Part VI"
1997	Dharma & Greg	Lindsay	Episode: "Haus Arrest"
1997	Almost Perfect	Lindsay Wolf	Episode: "Where No Man Has Gone Before"
1998	The Secret Diary of Desmond Pfeiffer	Mary Todd Lincoln	4 episodes
1999	Ally McBeal	Bonnie Mannix	Episode: "The Green Monster"
2000	Chicago Hope	Rene Sederberg	Episode: "Boys Will Be Girls"
2000	Titus	Juanita Titus	Episode: "Mom's Not Nuts"
2000	Touched by an Angel	Kate Radcliff	Episode: "Pandora's Box"
2000–02	Nikki	Marion	11 episodes
2002	Six Feet Under	Emily Previn	Episode: "The Invisible Woman"
2002	Crossing Jordan	Anne Lauer	Episode: "Scared Straight"
2002–03	The Guardian	Aunt Liz	2 episodes
2004	7th Heaven	Ruthie's teacher	Episode: "Don't Speak Ill of the Living or the Dead"
2004–12	Desperate Housewives	Martha Huber	12 episodes
2004	Strong Medicine	Berri Kaplan	Episode: "Quarantine"
2004	NYPD Blue	Lynn Cahill	Episode: "The 3-H Club"
2005	Veronica Mars	Madame Sophie	Episode: "Blast from the Past"
2006	Numb3rs	Laura Price	Episode: "Dark Matter"
2006	Bones	Lisa Supac	Episode: "The Titan on the Tracks"
2008	Law & Order	Hensley's attorney	Episode: "Angelgrove"
2009	Ghost Whisperer	Evelyn James	2 episodes
2010	Nip/Tuck	Sheila Carlton	Episode: "Sheila Carlton"
2011	American Horror Story: Murder House	Marcy	6 episodes
2012–15	Mad Men	Gail Holloway	8 episodes
2012	Anger Management	Judy	Episode: "Charlie Gets Romantic"
2013	Rules of Engagement	Moderator	Episode: "Baby Talk"
2014	State of Affairs	Therapist	Episode: "Pilot"
2015	Looking	Realtor	Episode: "Looking for Sanctuary"
2015	Blunt Talk	Mel	Episode: "The Queen of Hearts"
2015–16	American Horror Story: Hotel	Marcy	3 episodes
2016	Designated Survivor	Governor Chris Nichols	Episode: "The Interrogation"
2016, 2018	Crazy Ex-Girlfriend	Mrs. Patricia Davis	2 episodes
2018	American Woman	Peggy	3 episodes
2018-2019	9-1-1	Gloria Wagner	2 episodes
2019	Why Women Kill	Joyce Dubner	1 episode
2020	Brooklyn Nine-Nine	Margaret Fogle	Episode: "Debbie"
2020	Bless This Mess	Maryanne	Episode: "The Table"

=== Stage ===
Year	Title	Role	Notes
1976	Ladyhouse Blues	Eylie	
1976–77	Marco Polo	Princess Kogatin	
1977	The Cherry Orchard	Dunyasha	
1978	The Inspector General	Marya Antonovna	
1978	City Sugar	Nicola Davies	
1979	Ladyhouse Blues	Eylie	
1981	Inadmissible Evidence	Joy	
1982	Pastorale	Rachel	
1983	What I Did Last Summer	Elsie	
1983	Win/Lose/Draw	Various	Nominated—Drama Desk Award for Outstanding Actress in a Play
1983–84	Baby with the Bathwater	Helen	
1984	The Flight of the Earls	Bridgette Earl	
1985–88	I'm Not Rappaport	Clara	
1988–89	For Dear Life	Dottie	
1988	The Boys Next Door	Sheila	Drama Desk Award for Outstanding Featured Actress in a Play
1989	The Widow's Blind Date	Maggy Burke	
1990	What a Man Weighs	Joan	
1993–94	The Sisters Rosensweig	Pfeni Rosensweig	
2006–07	Spring Awakening	The Adult Woman	
