= Dope Couture =

Company

DOPE
- Product type: Fashion, Music, Streetwear, Sneaker and Skateboard Culture
- Current owner: Rob Gough
- Introduced: 2007
- Tagline: "No Dope, No Hope."
- Website: http://dope.com/

Dope Couture (est. 2007) is a streetwear brand founded by students at Indiana University. As of 2020 it is based in Los Angeles, California.

The company was founded by Matt Fields, Mike Schmidt, and Chris Mart. Field has been listed as the original director and designer.

The Dope brand has gotten exposure by way of hip-hop performers, including P Diddy, Jay-Z, Big Sean, Wale, Talib Kweli, Lil Xan, Wiz Khalifa, Mac Miller, Kendrick Lamar, and Kid Ink. Exposure on the Internet earned Dope a ranking in the top 500 of the Inc. 5000 with $5.4 million in revenue in 2013.

Along with an e-commerce store, Dope Couture operated brick and mortar stores in Bloomington, Indiana, Indianapolis, Indiana, and a flagship store located in Los Angeles, California, all of which have since been closed.

In 2017, the company was acquired by actor and Silicon Valley entrepreneur Rob Gough, with plans to expand the apparel business into womenswear and to branch out into cannabidiol products and smoking accessories. In 2020, Gough announced his plans to transition the business from apparel into a fully cannabidiol company by June 2021. In November 2020, Swedish outdoor-wear retailer Ridestore acquired Dope's US and Canada Dope clothing trademark profile from Gough's company, Epod America LLC.
