= Tales from Beyond =

- Directed by: Josh Austin; Nate Barlow; Eric Manning; Russell Scott
- Written by: Josh Austin; Nate Barlow; Eric Manning; Russell Scott
- Produced by: Josh Austin; Nate Barlow; Eric Manning; Russell Scott
- Starring: Adam West
- Distributed by: Anthem Pictures (US)
- Release date: September 9, 2004 (Temecula Valley International Film Festival)
- Country: United States
- Language: English
- Budget: $250,000

Tales from Beyond is a horror anthology featuring four short stories as told to a couple who wander into a strange bookstore.
