= Marty Munsch =

American record producer and recording engineer

- Born: Martin Munsch
- Genres: Punk rock
- Occupations: Record producer, sound engineer
- Years active: 1982–present
- Website: www.punkrockrecords.com

Marty Munsch is an American music producer and recording engineer who worked extensively with punk rock and post-punk as well as subgenre bands. His career has spanned over four decades.

== Record production and film work ==
Munsch founded Punk Rock Records in 1981, Northern Front Records in 1987, and Eastern Front Records in 1988, respectively. Munsch has produced and mastered over 45 LP albums and singles alongside material by pioneers TSOL "Live At CBGB", U.S. Chaos "You Can't Hear A Picture", The Rise Of Punk

Munsch appears in the 2008 film All Grown Up: The Movie by Andrea Witting.
