= Thea Kano =

American conductor (born 1965)

- Born: August 1, 1965 (age 59)
- Genres: Classical
- Occupation: Conductor
- Website: Dr. Kano's page on the GMCW Web site

Thea Kano (born August 1, 1965) is an American conductor. She is the Founder of the New York City Master Chorale, and was its Artistic Director until the end of the 2018–2019 season. She served as the Associate Music Director of the Gay Men's Chorus of Washington, D.C. from 2004 to 2014, and has been appointed its Artistic Director, effective September 2, 2014. She served as the Associate Conductor of the Washington Chorus and Artistic Director of the Capitol Hill Youth Chorus from 2004–2009, both of which she joined in 2004 after earning her doctorate in choral conducting from UCLA, writing her dissertation on Maurice Duruflé’s Requiem under Professor Donald Neuen. She also studied privately with Paul Salamunovich.

A native of northern California, Dr. Kano lives in Washington and New York. During the summer, Kano teaches at the Capitol Hill Arts Workshop in Washington.
