= Random Encounters =

- British DVD poster
- Directed by: Boris Undorf
- Screenplay by: Nate Barlow
- Produced by: Diane Clemenhagen; Shirley Kimble
- Starring: Abby Wathen; Meghan Markle; Michael Rady
- Cinematography: Daniel Applegate
- Music by: Emir Isilay
- Distributed by: Gravitas Ventures; Signature Entertainment
- Release date: December 1, 2013
- Running time: 93 minutes
- Country: United States
- Language: English

Random Encounters (British title A Random Encounter) is a 2013 American romantic-comedy film directed by Boris Undorf, written by Nate Barlow and starring Michael Rady, Meghan Markle, and Abby Wathen. The film was initially released on digital platforms in the United States December 1, 2013, and was rereleased in the United Kingdom under its new title on DVD and digital platforms May 7, 2018.

== Plot ==
Living in Los Angeles, Laura is a down-on-her-luck actress whose love life is faring no better and Kevin is an up-and-coming screenwriter trapped in a dead-end relationship with ditzy Cyndy.

After a particularly awful audition, Laura stops in a coffee shop to wait for a friend, and accidentally spills her drink over Kevin. She apologizes profusely, and they have a moment, but Kevin has to rush out to a big pitch meeting.

Laura's roommate and best friend, party girl Mindy, tries to help Laura with her love life, also to no avail. After a few days, both Kevin and Laura's thoughts drift towards each other.

== Cast ==
- Michael Rady as Kevin
- Abby Wathen as Laura
- Meghan Markle as Mindy
- Joshua LeBar as Ted
- Deja Kreutzberg as Cyndy
- Sean Young as Terri Preston
- Don Stark as Dr. Tim
- Nate Barlow as Nate

== Controversy ==
Upon the announcement of Meghan Markle's engagement to Prince Harry, the film garnered an influx of attention and a DVD rerelease was scheduled to coincide with the royal wedding. New trailers focused heavily on Meghan Markle, who was presented as having the leading role, ”snaring” her Prince Charming, the British tabloids at the time making much of her dresses and one ”racy” scene. Commentary on her role would continue long after the wedding

Controversy was later stirred with the release of the Netflix 2024 TikTok cult documentary series Dancing for the Devil. Several shots and a contract for the film appear in the series' second episode due to cult leader Robert Shinn having executive produced the film.

== Reception ==
Jason Palmer wrote: ”A dual perspective, A Random Encounter is a he-said, she-said, romantic comedy”. Later reception, however, was generally very mixed, James Croot of Stuff finding the film embarrassing, and Vogue describing it as a ”kind of a fun little rom-com (in a still-fairly-terrible way)”. The German website TV Today described it as ”A drawn-out love story with Prince Harry's wife in a curious supporting role.”
