= Jack Reed (series) =

American film series (1992–1996)

Jack Reed is a series or franchise of made-for-TV crime drama films fictionalizing the career of real-life Cook County Sheriff's Homicide Investigator Jack Reed. The first film, Deadly Matrimony, a two-part drama based on the Barbara Schaaf non-fiction book about the Dianne Masters murder case, Shattered Hopes, was first broadcast in 1992. It was written by Andrew Laskos, directed by John Korty, and starred Brian Dennehy as Reed.

Deadly Matrimony was well-enough received that it was followed, the next year by Badge of Honor, also written by Laskos, and directed by Kevin Connor. Dennehy, who had pushed to get more films based on Reed's career made, was the co-executive producer.

Further sequels, also starring Dennehy, were also all directed by him.

All the films were loosely based on cases Reed had investigated during his police career.

In the films, Reed was depicted as a sergeant; and an ex-priest. In real life, by the time the films were being broadcast, Reed was a lieutenant, in charge of the Sheriff's cold case detail. When he retired from the Sheriff's Police after thirty-five years, he entered private security.

The series includes the TV films:

- 1992: Deadly Matrimony directed by John Korty
- 1993: Jack Reed: Badge of Honor directed by Kevin Connor
- 1994: Jack Reed: A Search for Justice directed by Brian Dennehy
- 1995: Jack Reed: One of Our Own directed by Brian Dennehy
- 1996: Jack Reed: A Killer Among Us directed by Brian Dennehy
- 1996: Jack Reed: Death and Vengeance directed by Brian Dennehy
