= Vic Polizos =

American actor (born 1947)

- Born: Nicholas Victor Polizos; August 12, 1947 (age 79); Montgomery, Alabama, U.S.
- Education: Emory University; Temple University
- Occupations: Film, television and theatre actor
- Spouse: Christine Estabrook (m. 1998)
- Children: 2
- Relatives: Dimitri Polizos (cousin)

Nicholas Victor Polizos (born August 12, 1947) is an American film, television and theatre actor. He is best known for playing the recurring role of Detective Frank Richmond in the American legal drama television series Boston Legal. He also played the recurring roles of Joe Thomopolous in Who's the Boss? and Shep Cale in Jericho.

== Life and career ==
Polizos was born and raised in Montgomery, Alabama, the son of Greek parents. He attended Robert E. Lee High School in Montgomery, Alabama, graduating in 1964. After graduating, he attended Emory University, studying psychology, and graduating in 1967. During his college career, he didn't consider studying acting, and he auditioned in the department of theatre, while it had auditions for the stage play A Man for All Seasons, playing Chapuys, the Spanish ambassador. He then attended Georgia State University. He dropped out of college, and received got an audition from a director, recommending him to perform with an acting group.

Polizos moved to Philadelphia, Pennsylvania and attended Temple University. He performed in a summer theatre program in Williamstown, Massachusetts, and toured with the production of The History of Rock and Roll. He then moved to New York to begin his stage career. After his move to New York, he worked as a bartender, and was about to give up his acting career, but he received a call from Meg Simon, a casting director, who cast Polizos to play the role of a dockwrotker and sailor in the Broadway play Anna Christie.

In 1979, Polizos starred in the Broadway play Whoopee!, playing Mort. The next year, he was offered the role of Billy Baylock in the film Brubaker. He moved to Los Angeles, California after he borrowed money from his father, earning acting roles, and in 1985, he appeared in the television pilot Condor. He played the recurring roles of Detective Frank Richmond in Boston Legal, Joe Thomopolous in Who's the Boss and Shep Cale in Jericho. He guest-starred in numerous television programs including Married... with Children, Seinfeld, The Larry Sanders Show, Roseanne, The X-Files, Walker, Texas Ranger, Hill Street Blues, Malcolm in the Middle, NYPD Blue, Desperate Housewives, Family Ties, Modern Family, Mad About You, CSI: Crime Scene Investigation, The Practice, Grace Under Fire and The A-Team.

In 2007, Polizos appeared in the film Randy and the Mob, and auditioned for the starring role of Randy Pearson, but had not noticed that the film would be shot in Atlanta, Georgia.
