= Amber Benson =

American actress (born 1977)

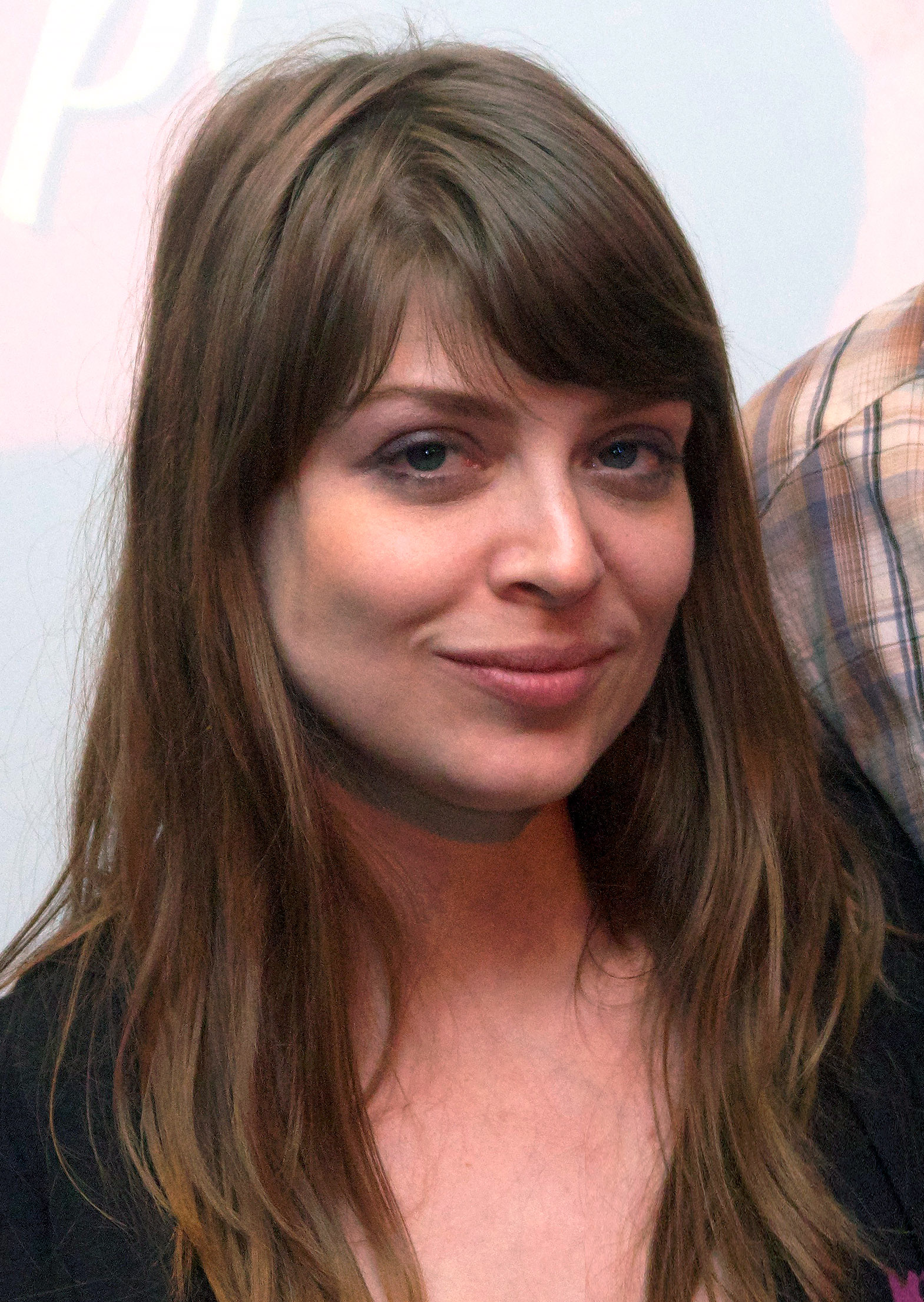
- Benson in 2012
- Born: January 8, 1977 (age 49); Birmingham, Alabama, U.S.
- Occupations: Actress; writer; director; producer
- Years active: 1992–present

Amber Benson (born January 8, 1977) is an American actress, writer, director, and producer. She is best known for her role as Tara Maclay on the TV series Buffy the Vampire Slayer (1999–2002), and has directed, produced and starred in her own films Chance (2002) and Lovers, Liars & Lunatics (2006). She also starred in the movie Kiss the Bride (2007). She co-directed the film Drones (2010) with fellow Buffy cast member Adam Busch, and starred as a waitress in the crime thriller The Killing Jar (2010).

== Early life ==
Benson was born January 8, 1977, in Birmingham, Alabama, her father is a psychiatrist. She has a younger sister who is an artist. Her father is Jewish and her mother was raised Southern Baptist; Benson grew up attending a Reform synagogue in Alabama.

== Career ==
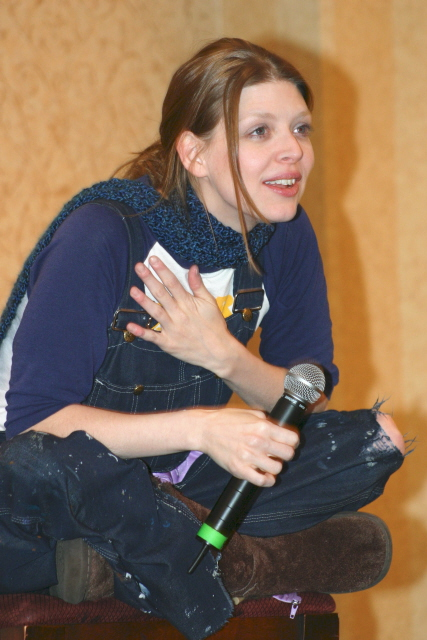
Benson at a 2005 Buffy the Vampire Slayer convention

Benson was 14 when she made her feature film debut in the Steven Soderbergh film King of the Hill.

Benson is best known for her recurring role as Tara Maclay on the television series Buffy the Vampire Slayer. The character first appeared in the season 4 episode "Hush" and soon became the girlfriend of Willow Rosenberg, played by Alyson Hannigan. Benson remained with the series until season 6 when her character was killed off. In her final episode, Benson was credited for the first time ever as a regular cast member.

Benson sang in the Buffy the Vampire Slayer musical episode "Once More, with Feeling". She provided vocals for the songs "I've Got a Theory/ Bunnies/If We're Together", "Under Your Spell" (her solo), "Walk Through the Fire", "Standing/Under Your Spell (Reprise)", and "Where Do We Go from Here?" In 2002, she performed two songs on Buffy colleague Anthony Stewart Head's album Music for Elevators. She also sang "Toucha Toucha Touch Me" (aka "Creature of the Night") at VH-1's celebrity karaoke tribute to The Rocky Horror Picture Show.

While still working on Buffy the Vampire Slayer, Benson co-wrote the movie The Theory of the Leisure Class with director Gabriel Bologna, released in 2001, and directed, produced, edited, and acted in a digital video feature called Chance (2002) which also featured her Buffy co-star James Marsters. She also collaborated with director James Kerwin in 2003 to produce her play Albert Hall in Hollywood.

In 2001, Benson worked with Golden, Terry Moore, and Eric Powell of Dark Horse Comics to create the Buffy the Vampire Slayer: Willow and Tara comic book titled "WannaBlessedBe". The following year (2002), she worked with Christopher Golden and Ajit Jothikaumar of Dark Horse Comics to create the Buffy the Vampire Slayer: Willow and Tara comic books titled Wilderness #1 and Wilderness #2.

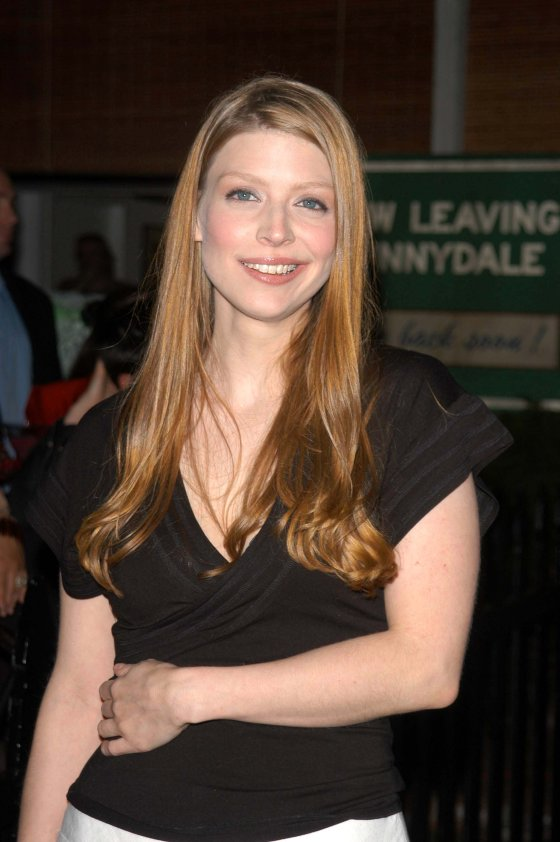
Benson at a Buffy the Vampire Slayer wrap party in 2003

Benson and Golden produced and began a series of animated fantasy films for the BBC with the animation studio Cosgrove Hall: Ghosts of Albion: Legacy (2003) and its sequels. Benson and Golden have also collaborated on two supernatural thrillers: Ghosts of Albion: Accursed and Ghosts of Albion: Witchery. These books follow the fortunes of Tamara and William Swift.

In 2003, she played a supporting role in Latter Days as Traci Levine, alongside Steve Sandvoss and Wes Ramsey.

In 2005, Benson collaborated with artist Jamie McKelvie on a short story within the Image Comics collection Four Letter Worlds. In 2006, Benson collaborated with artist Ben Templesmith on Demon Father John's Pinwheel Blues published by IDW as a four-part split-book, Shadowplay (with work by Ashley Wood and Christina Z.

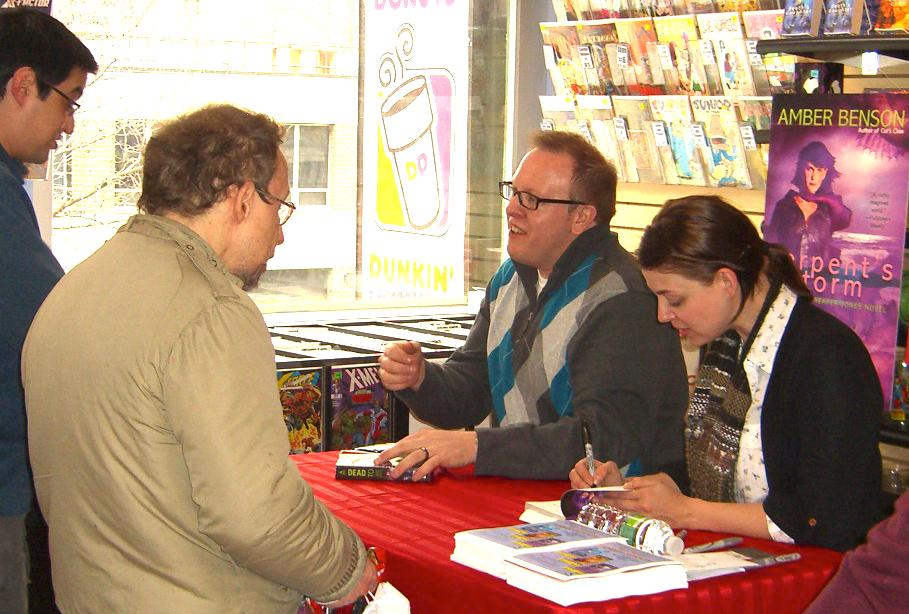
Benson and novelist Anton Strout during an appearance at the Midtown Comics Downtown in Manhattan on March 5, 2011

In 2006, Benson released her second independent feature film Lovers, Liars & Lunatics through her own production company, Benson Entertainment. The film was shot on film and was partly financed by the sale of limited edition "Triangle" Tara Buffyverse action figure. The project, initially called "The Dirty Script," was ultimately titled Lovers, Liars and Lunatics by producer Diane Benson, Amber's mother.

In 2006, Benson also portrayed the "vegetarian" vampiress Lenore on the TV series Supernatural.

In December 2006, Benson and Golden released another collaboration: the short novel The Seven Whistlers, distributed through Subterranean Press in a limited number of signed copies. In September 2007, Benson signed a three-book deal with Ginjer Buchanan of Penguin Books. Death's Daughter, was released by Ace Books on February 24, 2009; Cat's Claw, on February 23, 2010; and Serpent's Storm, in February 2011. On February 28, 2012, the fourth book in the series, How to Be Death was released.

In 2010, Benson and Adam Busch co-directed the 2010 comedy film Drones.

In 2012, Benson played a young Judith Collins in the Dark Shadows audio drama "Dress Me in Dark Dreams". She guest starred in the second season of the Jane Espenson scripted romantic comedy web series, Husbands.

In June 2013, it was announced that Benson has been attached to star in the web TV series adaptation of The Morganville Vampires as Amelie, the founder of Morganville.

Benson narrated the 2014 audiobook Lock In by John Scalzi. In October 2014, she published her fantasy book The Witches of Echo Park.

Benson wrote, directed, and provided her voice to Slayers: A Buffyverse Story alongside her former Buffy costars James Marsters, Charisma Carpenter, Anthony Head, Juliet Landau, Emma Caulfield Ford, James Charles Leary and Danny Strong. The Audible exclusive, written with Christopher Golden, was released in October 2023.

In 2024 Benson narrated the first two audiobooks in the Blood & Ancient Scrolls series by Raven Belasco, Blood Ex Libris and Blood Demands.

== Activism ==
During the 2008 campaign season, Benson was featured in a Barack Obama advertisement sponsored by MoveOn.org.

In February 2021, Benson spoke out in support of Buffy the Vampire Slayer co-star Charisma Carpenter's accusation of unprofessional and abusive behavior on the part of Buffy creator Joss Whedon, corroborating Carpenter's account by relating that the set of that series was a "toxic environment" whose traumatic effects upon those who worked there were long-lasting.

== Personal life ==
As of 2007, Benson resided in Los Angeles. She described herself as a "lapsed vegetarian".

== Filmography ==
=== Film ===
Year	Title	Role	Notes
1993	The Crush	Cheyenne	
1993	King of the Hill	Ella McShane	
1994	S.F.W.	Barbara 'Babs' Wyler	
1994	Imaginary Crimes	Margaret	
1995	Bye Bye Love	Meg Damico	
1998	Can't Hardly Wait	Stephanie	
2000	The Prime Gig	Batgirl	
2001	Don's Plum	Amy	
2001	Hollywood, Pennsylvania	Mandy Calhoun	
2002	Taboo	Piper	
2002	Chance	Chance	Also writer and director
2003	Latter Days	Traci Levine	
2005	Intermedio	Barbie	
2005	Race You to the Bottom	Maggie	
2006	Lovers, Liars & Lunatics	Justine	Also writer and director
2007	Gryphon	Princess Amelia Of Lockland	
2007	Simple Things	Sally	
2007	Kiss the Bride	Elly	
2008	Strictly Sexual	Donna	
2008	One-Eyed Monster	Laura	
2009	The Blue Tooth Virgin	Jennifer	
2009	Tripping Forward	Gwen	
2010	Drones		Co-director
2010	The Killing Jar	Noreen	
2010	Another Harvest Moon	Gretchen	
2011	Act Your Age	Julia	
2012	Dust Up	Ella	
2015	Desire Will Set You Free	Jayne	
2016	Apartment 407	Chloe	originally titled Selling Isobel
2018	House of Demons	Maya	
2018	Glossary of Broken Dreams	Pfefferkarree McCormick	
2018	The Griddle House	Tiny	
2019	The Nightmare Gallery	Samantha Rand	
2024	I Saw the TV Glow	Johnny Link's Mom	

=== Television ===
Year	Title	Role	Notes
1993	Jack Reed: Badge of Honor	Nicole Reed	TV film
1994	Jack Reed: A Search for Justice	Nicole Reed	TV film
1995	Jack Reed: One of Our Own	Nicole Reed	TV film
1996	Partners	Pam	Episode: "Follow the Clams?"
1998	Promised Land	Amy Farnsworth	Episode: "Out of Bounds"
1999	Cracker	Amy	Episode: "The Club"
1999–2002	Buffy the Vampire Slayer	Tara Maclay	Recurring role (seasons 4–6), main (season 6.19)
2001	The Enforcers	Abby	TV miniseries
2004	Cold Case	Julia Hoffman	Episode: "Volunteers"
2005	The Inside	Allison Davis	Episode: "The Perfect Couple"
2006	Holiday Wishes	Danni Hartford	TV film
2006, 2011	Supernatural	Lenore	Episodes: "Bloodlust", "Mommy Dearest"
2008	7 Things to Do Before I'm 30	Lori Madison	TV film
2008	Long Island Confidential	Liz	TV film
2009	Private Practice	Jill Avery	Episode: "Finishing"
2010	Grey's Anatomy	Corinne Henley	Episode: "That's Me Trying"
2011	Count Jeff	Colleen	Episodes: "Pilot", "Sucks to Be Me", "I'll Sleep When I'm Dead"
2011	Strictly Sexual: The Series	Donna	Episode: "Laugh, Cry, Say Goodbye"
2011	Ringer	Mary Curtis	Episode: "That's What You Get for Trying to Kill Me"
2012	Futurestates	Laura Keller	Episode: "Laura Keller: NB"
2012	Husbands	Angry Mom	Episodes: "Appropriate Is Not the Word", "The Straightening"
2013	Shelf Life	Raggy Ann	Episode: "Powered Up"
2013	Twisted Tales	Dhianna	Episode: "Shockwave"
2014	The Glass Slipper Confessionals	Tinkerbell	Episodes: "Think Happy Thoughts", "The Pixie Chicks"
2014	Morganville: The Series	Amelie	TV miniseries
2016	Sunday Morning	Marcy	Episode: "Marcy and Cliff"
2016	Red vs. Blue	Female Grif (voice)	Episode: "Get Bent"
2016	The Crooked Man	Grace	TV film
2017	Oscar Pistorius: Blade Runner Killer	-	TV film; Writer of screenplay

=== Video game ===
Year	Title	Role	Notes
2003	Buffy the Vampire Slayer: Chaos Bleeds	Tara Maclay	

== Bibliography ==
=== Books ===
==== Ghosts of Albion ====
with Christopher Golden

#	Title	Also In	Publication Date	Publisher
1	Astray		2004	Subterranean Press
1.1	"Legacy"	Short story, available on the BBC website		
2	Accursed		2005	Del Rey
3	Witchery		2006	Del Rey

==== Calliope Reaper-Jones ====
1. Death's Daughter (February 24, 2009)
2. Cat's Claw (February 23, 2010)
3. Serpent's Storm (February 22, 2011)
4. How to be Death (February 28, 2012)
5. The Golden Age of Death (Feb 2013)

==== The Witches of Echo Park ====
Title	Date	Publisher	Length	Identifiers	Notes / Plot	Ref.
The Witches of Echo Park	January 6, 2015	Ace Books	294 pp	ISBN 9780425268674; LCCN 2014-35728; OCLC 933453334		
The Last Dream Keeper	January 5, 2016	Ace Books				
The End of Magic	May 16, 2017	Ace Books				

==== Other books ====
- The Seven Whistlers (with Christopher Golden, 2006)
- Star and Marco's Guide to Mastering Every Dimension (with Dominic Bisignano, Disney Press, 2017) ISBN 978-1484774199

==== Anthologies and collections ====
Anthology or Collection	Contents	Publication Date
21st Century Dead	Antiparallelogram	Jul 2012
An Apple for a Creature	Callie Meet Happy	Aug 2012
Life Inside My Mind	Therapy: the gift I gave myself	Apr 2018

=== Comics ===
==== Buffy the Vampire Slayer ====
- WannaBlessedBe (Willow & Tara with Christopher Golden, 2003)
- Wilderness (with Christopher Golden)
- "The Innocent" in Tales of the Slayers

==== Other comics ====
- Shadowplay #1–4 (with Ben Templesmith, 2005)
- Among the Ghosts (with Sina Grace, illustrator, August 2010)
- Clueless: Senior Year (with Sarah Kuhn)
- Clueless: One Last Summer (with Sarah Kuhn)

=== Other media ===
- Illusions (with Christopher Golden. Animated feature, directed by Benson, available on the BBC website)
- The Ghosts of Albion Roleplaying Game (with Timothy S. Brannan and Christopher Golden, Eden Studios, 2007)
- Middlegame by Seanan McGuire, narrated by Benson
- Walkaway by Cory Doctorow, narrated by Benson
- Attack Surface by Cory Doctorow, narrated by Benson
- Lock In by John Scalzi, narrated by Benson
- Head On by John Scalzi, narrated by Benson
- Swarm by Scott Westerfeld, narrated by Benson
- Zeroes by Scott Westerfeld, narrated by Benson
- Slayers: A Buffyverse Story by Christopher Golden and Benson, narrated by an ensemble cast
- Constituent Service by John Scalzi, narrated by Benson
