= White Lies (upcoming film) =

- Directed by: Oliver Stone
- Written by: Oliver Stone
- Produced by: Fernando Sulichin; Maximilien Arvelaiz; Jordan Gertner
- Starring: Josh Hartnett; Leila George; Ellen Barkin; Willem Dafoe; Michael Douglas
- Production companies: New Element Media; Nighthawk Capital Limited
- Country: United States
- Language: English

White Lies is an upcoming American drama film written and directed by Oliver Stone. It stars Josh Hartnett, Leila George, Ellen Barkin, Willem Dafoe, and Michael Douglas.

== Premise ==
A story tracing through three generations that portrays a child of divorce now repeating his parents' mistakes in his own marriage and with his troubled son. Feeling trapped, he embarks on a lust-filled journey to free himself but only becomes more lost. When he meets a woman whose life is the opposite of his own, he begins a journey of rediscovery.

== Cast ==
- Josh Hartnett as Jack Freeman
- Leila George
- Ellen Barkin
- Willem Dafoe
- Michael Douglas
- Homer Gere
- Yvonne Chapman
- Aston McAuley as Colin
- Stephanie Suganami

== Production ==
In August 2018, it was reported that Oliver Stone would be writing and directing a drama film starring Benicio del Toro.

By March 2026, del Toro exited the project due to the delays of the project, with Josh Hartnett replacing him. Principal photography began later that month, in Rome, Bangkok, and Sofia, when Leila George joined the cast. Homer Gere, Yvonne Chapman, Ellen Barkin, Willem Dafoe, Michael Douglas, and Stephanie Suganami rounded out the cast, when filming concluded in June 2026.
