= Jeff Pearlman =

American sportswriter (born 1972)

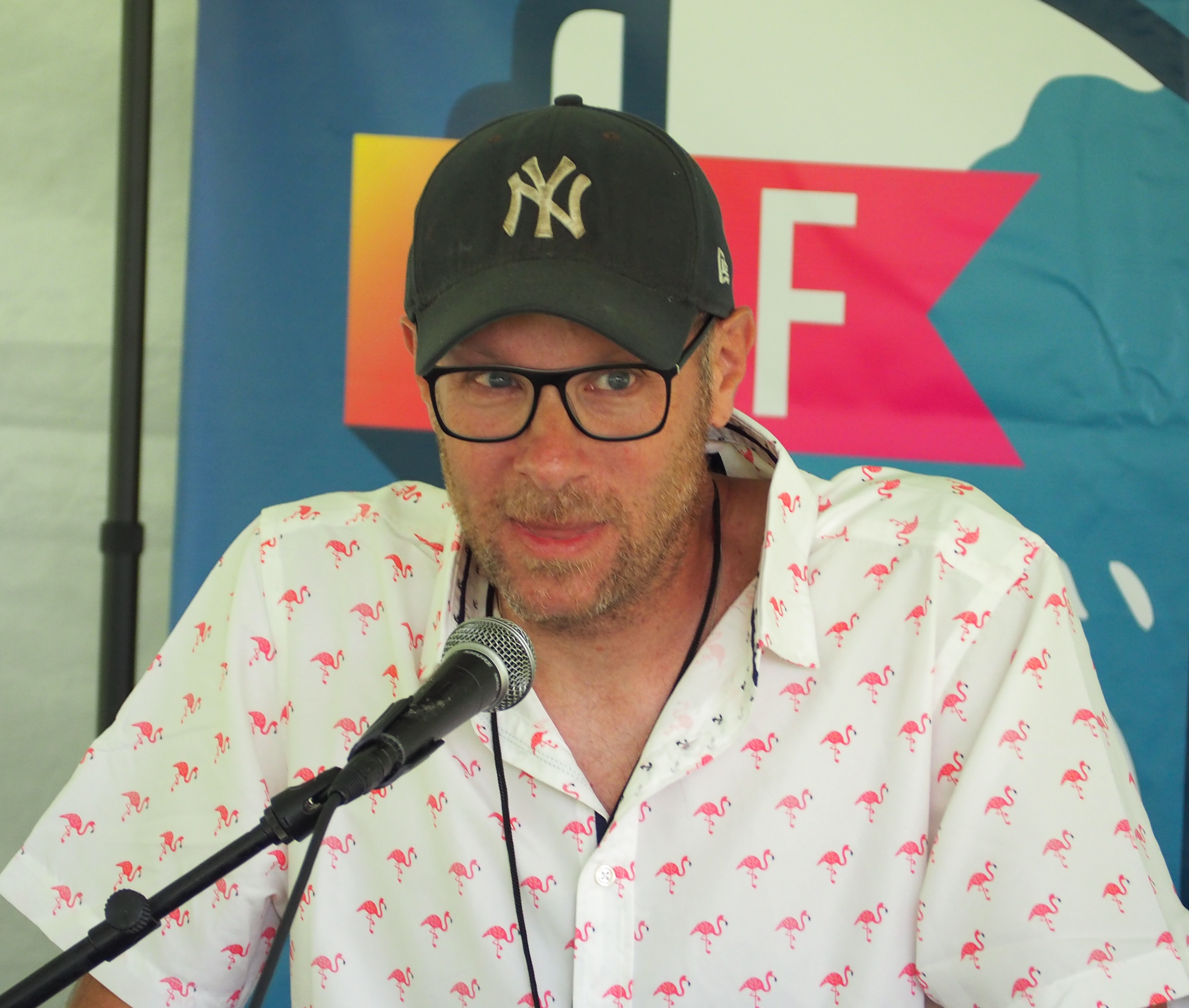
- Pearlman at the Gaithersburg Book Festival in Gaithersburg, Maryland, May 2023
- Born: 1972 (age 53–54); Mahopac, New York, U.S.
- Education: University of Delaware
- Occupation: Writer
- Spouse: Catherine Pearlman
- Children: 2
- Writing career
- Period: 1996–present

Jeffrey Pearlman (born 1972) is an American sportswriter. He has written ten books which are New York Times Best Sellers: four about football, three on baseball, two about basketball and a biography of rapper Tupac Shakur. In 1999, he interviewed John Rocker for an infamous Sports Illustrated article in which Rocker made several racist and controversial comments.

== Career ==
Pearlman was born and grew up in Mahopac, New York. He got his start in journalism in 1989 when he interned at The Patent Trader, a weekly newspaper in Cross River, New York. After graduating from the University of Delaware, he was hired as a food and fashion writer by The Tennessean in Nashville. In 1996, Pearlman was hired by Sports Illustrated, where he was a baseball writer for nearly seven years.

In 2002, Pearlman left Sports Illustrated, spending the next two years at Newsday but left to focus on writing books. He keeps a personal online blog, where he posts a weekly Q&A series, The Quaz, with athletes, politicians, actors, singers and many random people. He has also used the site to write about intimate issues such as seeing a rival book get publicity in Sports Illustrated, where he was working, or finding blood in his feces after using the toilet.

He was a frequent contributor to ESPN.com's Page 2 then a columnist for SI.com. No stranger to controversy, Pearlman used his own website as a forum to call out the Christian missionary goals of Tim Tebow's father as "pretty evil." In the fall of 2007, Pearlman wrote several controversial articles on Page 2 regarding the lack of a rivalry between the University of Delaware's and Delaware State University's football teams. Delaware State University is in Dover. UD and DSU finally played a football game on November 23, 2007, part of the NCAA Division I FCS playoffs. Delaware won the game by a score of 44–7.

Pearlman was advisor to the student newspaper at Manhattanville College in Purchase, New York from 2011 to 2012 but his contract was not renewed because, according to Pearlman, the college was more concerned about "image control" than about producing "a quality student newspaper."

== Books ==
Pearlman is the author of The Bad Guys Won, a biography of the 1986 New York Mets subtitled, "A Season of Brawling, Boozing, Bimbo-chasing and Championship Baseball with Straw, Doc, Mookie, Nails, The Kid, and the Rest of the 1986 Mets, the Rowdiest Team Ever to Put on a New York Uniform--and Maybe the Best." In 2004, the book spent eight weeks on The New York Times Best Seller list.

In 2006, he published Love Me, Hate Me, an unauthorized biography of Barry Bonds for which the author said he interviewed 524 subjects. Pearlman said that because Love Me, Hate Me was released three weeks after Game of Shadows, it quickly faded. His third book, Boys Will Be Boys, on the 1990s Dallas Cowboys dynasty, was on the New York Times bestseller's list for 10 weeks.

Pearlman's fourth book, a biography of Roger Clemens titled The Rocket That Fell to Earth, was released by HarperCollins on March 24, 2009. The book is a detailed account of Clemens' life on and off the baseball field. Pearlman next wrote Sweetness, a 2011 biography of Walter Payton, the Chicago Bears running back. In March 2014, Pearlman released Showtime: Magic, Kareem, Riley, and the Los Angeles Lakers Dynasty of the 1980s, a biography of the 1980s Los Angeles Lakers. It became his fourth New York Times best seller. The book was adapted into the HBO docudrama series Winning Time: The Rise of the Lakers Dynasty, which came out in 2022.

His seventh book, a biography of Brett Favre titled Gunslinger, was released in October 2016 and spent considerable time on the New York Times bestseller's list. In Gunslinger, Pearlman chronicles Favre's life, from his early years in Kiln, Mississippi and playing quarterback for the high school team coached by his father, through his years at the University of Southern Mississippi in Hattiesburg and his NFL career with the Atlanta Falcons, Green Bay Packers, New York Jets, and Minnesota Vikings. In addition to reporting on Favre's football career, Pearlman addresses Favre's life off the field including his marriage and family life as well as his problems with alcohol and pain medication. Pearlman did not interview Favre for the book but he did interview some of Favre's family members and many teammates and coaches.

Pearlman wrote Football for a Buck, released in 2018, about the short-lived United States Football League. It was on the New York Times Best Seller list for several months. That year, Pearlman also served as the guest editor for The Best American Sports Writing 2018. In 2020, he released Three-Ring Circus: Kobe, Shaq, Phil, and the Crazy Years of the Lakers Dynasty, about the 2000s Los Angeles Lakers. In 2022, Pearlman released The Last Folk Hero: The Life and Myth of Bo Jackson, a biography of Bo Jackson.

In 2025, Pearlman released his first non-sports book, Only God Can Judge Me: The Many Lives of Tupac Shakur, a biography of Tupac Shakur. Pearlman interviewed over 600 people for the book.

== Personal life ==
Pearlman and his wife, Catherine, have two children: a daughter and a son.

== Bibliography ==
- The Bad Guys Won!: A Season of Brawling, Boozing, Bimbo Chasing, and Championship Baseball with Straw, Doc, Mookie, Nails, the Kid, and the Rest of the 1986 Mets, the Rowdiest Team Ever to Put on a New York Uniform--and Maybe the Best (2005). ISBN 9780060507336
- Love Me, Hate Me: Barry Bonds and the Making of an Antihero (2006). ISBN 9780060797539
- Boys Will Be Boys: The Glory Days and Party Nights of the Dallas Cowboys Dynasty (2008). ISBN 9780061256806
- The Rocket That Fell to Earth: Roger Clemens and the Rage for Baseball Immortality (2009). ISBN 9780061724756
- Sweetness: The Enigmatic Life of Walter Payton (2011). ISBN 9781592406531
- Showtime: Magic, Kareem, Riley, and the Los Angeles Lakers Dynasty of the 1980s (2014). ISBN 9781592407552
- Gunslinger: The Remarkable, Improbable, Iconic Life of Brett Favre (2016). ISBN 9780544454378
- Football for a Buck: The Crazy Rise and Crazier Demise of the USFL (2018). ISBN 9780544454385
- Three-Ring Circus: Kobe, Shaq, Phil, and the Crazy Years of the Lakers Dynasty (2020). ISBN 9781328530004
- The Last Folk Hero: The Life and Myth of Bo Jackson (2022). ISBN 9780358437673
- Only God Can Judge Me: The Many Lives of Tupac Shakur (2025). ISBN 9780063304574
