= Fernando Sulichin =

Argentine film and documentary maker

- Born: Buenos Aires, Argentina
- Occupation: Filmmaker

Fernando Sulichin is an Argentine film and documentary maker. He has produced over 25 films and documentaries.

Since 2003 Sulichin has worked on a number of documentaries with the director and producer Oliver Stone including ones about living public figures Edward Snowden, Fidel Castro and Hugo Chavez.

== Early life ==
Sulichin was born in Buenos Aires, Argentina and moved to the United States in the late 1980s to study architecture at UCLA. While studying he became interested in the film industry and never completed his architecture studies.

== Career ==
Sulichin was the associate producer of the 1992 film Malcolm X, directed by Spike Lee. He is credited with securing permission for the film crew to enter Mecca and for getting Nelson Mandela to perform a cameo role in the film.

Sulichin is the founder of two production companies, Central Films and New Element Media, which have produced a number of films such as Sundance Prize Winner “Love Liza“ (2003) by Todd Louiso and Mary (2004) by Abel Ferrara, winner at Venice Film Festival.

In addition to fictional films, Sulichin has produced documentaries and films about high-profile living individuals, partnering with Oliver Stone to make films on Vladimir Putin, Fidel Castro, Hugo Chavez, and Snowden.

In 2016, it was reported that Sulichin accompanied actors Sean Penn and Kate del Castillo on their secret meeting with El Chapo in his hideout in the mountains of Durango prior to his arrest. The now famous meeting was purportedly to discuss the prospect of making a movie about the Sinaloa cartel leader. However, the Mexican authorities later insinuated that tracking the group's visit aided them in arresting El Chapo arrest three months later. This led to speculation that the group may have been working with the US and Mexican authorities to locate one of the most wanted criminals and notorious drug lords. Both Penn and del Castillo have said that they have feared for their lives since the ill-fated meeting.

In January 2025, it was announced that Sulichin would be producing a new documentary exploring the life of Melania Trump. The documentary began filming in 2025 and is due to be released by Amazon early 2026.

== Philanthropy ==
He is a founding and life-time member of the Nelson Mandela Children's Fund, having met Mandela through filming Malcolm X in 1992.

He sits on the board of CORE (formerly J/P Haitian Relief Organization), American actor Sean Penn's foundation that was initially established to deliver humanitarian relief during the Haitian disaster in January 2010. In 2017, he received the Garry Shandling Humanitarian Award alongside Sean Penn for their Haitian relief work.

He is reported to support the David Lynch Foundation, a charitable foundation set up by the film director of the same name that focuses on alleviating mental health problems and healing trauma.

In addition to humanitarian causes, Sulichin has been involved in raising awareness about environmental issues and climate change, for which he received the National Order of the Légion d'honneur in 2015.

In June 2019, Sulichin spoke at the Peace to Prosperity workshop in Bahrain. Sulichin sat on a panel with the head of the international football federation (FIFA) Gianni Infantino and the pair discussed the role that entertainment and sport could play in brokering peace in the Middle East.

== Honours and awards ==
- 2015 Chevalier (knight) de Légion d'Honneur, France.

In 2018, Sulichin was awarded The Sheikh Abdullah Award for Intercultural Dialogue at the No2H8 Crime Awards 2018.

== Filmography ==
Year	Film title	Role	Type
1992	Malcolm X	Associate Producer	Feature length
1994	Touch Base	Associate Producer	Short film
1995	The Addiction	Producer	Feature length
2001	Bully	Producer	Feature length
2002	Love Liza	Producer	Feature length
2002	Spun	Producer	Feature length
2003	Comandante	Producer	Documentary
2003	Tiptoes	Executive producer	TV documentary series
2003	Persona Non Grata	Producer	Documentary
2004	She Hate Me	Producer	Feature length
2004	Alexander	Co-executive producer	Feature length
2005	Mary	Producer	Feature length
2006	Babel	Producer	Feature length
2006	Looking for Fidel	Producer	Documentary
2009	I Come with the Rain	Producer	Feature length
2009	South of the Border	Producer	Documentary
2010	The Killer Inside Me	Executive Producer	Feature length
2012	Castro in Winter	Producer	Documentary
2012	Savages	Executive producer	Feature length
2012	Spring Breakers	Executive producer	Feature length
2012-2013	The Untold History of the United States	Producer	TV documentary series
2014	Mi Amigo Hugo	Producer	Documentary
2014	It's a Beautiful World	Producer	Documentary
2014	Go Brasil Go!	Producer	Documentary
2016	Gimme Danger	Producer	Documentary
2016	Snowden	Producer	Feature length
2017	Little Heroes	Producer	Feature length
2017	The Putin Interviews	Producer	TV documentary series
2018	At Eternity's Gate	Executive producer	Feature length
2018	London Field	Executive producer	Feature length
2020	Jesus Rolls	Producer	Feature length
2021	JFK Revisited: Through the Looking Glass	Executive Producer	Feature length
2021	Flag Day	Producer	Feature length
TBA	White Lies	Producer	Feature length
