= Solomon Hughes (actor) =

American educator, athlete, and actor

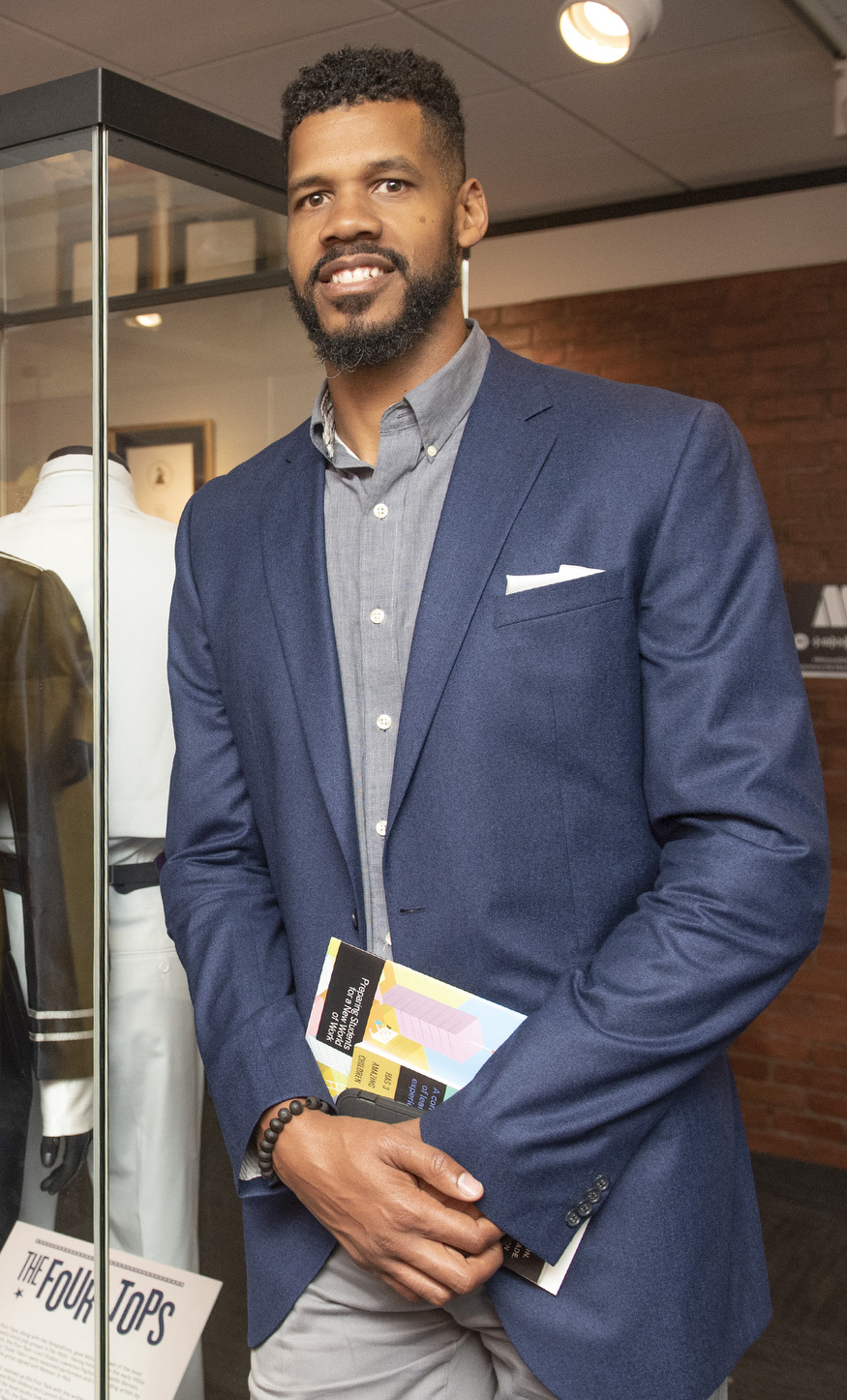
- Hughes at the LBJ Library in 2020
- Born: February 28, 1979 (age 47)
- Education: University of California, Berkeley (BA, MA); University of Georgia (PhD)
- Occupations: educator; athlete; actor
- Years active: 1997–present
- Known for: lead role of Kareem Abdul-Jabbar in Winning Time: The Rise of the Lakers Dynasty
- Basketball career

Personal information
- Listed height: 6 ft 11 in (2.11 m)
- Listed weight: 225 lb (102 kg)

Career information
- High school: John Wesley North High School (Riverside, California); Bishop Montgomery (Torrance, California); Fork Union Military Academy (Fork Union, Virginia)
- College: California (1998–2002)
- NBA draft: 2002: undrafted
- Position: Center
- Number: 14

Solomon Young Hughes (Note: Hughes' full name is printed out on the title page of his University of Georgia PhD dissertation.) (born February 28, 1979) is an American educator, athlete, and actor known for his leading role as Kareem Abdul-Jabbar in Winning Time: The Rise of the Lakers Dynasty a sports drama television series on HBO.

== Sports career ==
Hughes stands 6 feet 11 inches (2.11 m) tall. His father, Ronald Hughes, played basketball at California State University, Fullerton and is a professor of sociology there. He played on the basketball team at Bishop Montgomery High School in Torrance, California, graduating in 1997. At age 17, he signed a letter of intent to play for Tulane University, but decided not to enroll there, which subjected him to a two-year ban on playing NCAA basketball. He attended Fork Union Military Academy for the 1997–98 school year, then enrolled in the University of California, Berkeley, practicing with the California Golden Bears despite his ineligibility. Upon appeal, the NCAA reinstated his eligibility on November 3, 1998, and Hughes played his first collegiate game that night. Hughes played with the Golden Bears for four years and was a captain of the team.

He played for the Harlem Globetrotters for 13 games and tried out for the National Basketball Association in 2003. Hughes also played professionally in the United States Basketball League, the American Basketball Association, and in a professional basketball league in Mexico.

== Educational career ==
Hughes graduated from the University of California, Berkeley earning a BA in Sociology and MA in Education. In 2013, he received his PhD in Higher Education and Policy Studies from the University of Georgia Institute of Higher Education for his dissertation titled "Approaching signing day: the college choice process of heavily recruited student athletes”. Hughes is an instructor and faculty affiliate at Duke University's Samuel DuBois Cook Center on Social Equity. He was also a visiting instructor on the academic staff at Stanford University as well as the assistant director of the EDGE Doctoral Fellowship Program at Stanford.

== Acting career ==
Hughes was cast as Kareem Abdul-Jabbar in HBO's Winning Time: The Rise of the Lakers Dynasty. Playing Abdul-Jabbar was Hughes' first acting role, playing the iconic athlete for 17 episodes over 2 seasons. The show has since been cancelled, with the Season 2 finale acting as the series finale.

== Filmography ==
=== Film ===
Year	Title	Role	Notes
2025	Guns Up	Ford Holden	
2023	Sweet Santa Barbara Brown	Highlight	Short film, also wrote the script

=== Television ===
Year	Title	Role	Notes
2022–2023	Winning Time: The Rise of the Lakers Dynasty	Kareem Abdul-Jabbar	Main role, 17 episodes
