= Rusev (wrestler) =

Bulgarian-American professional wrestler (born 1985)

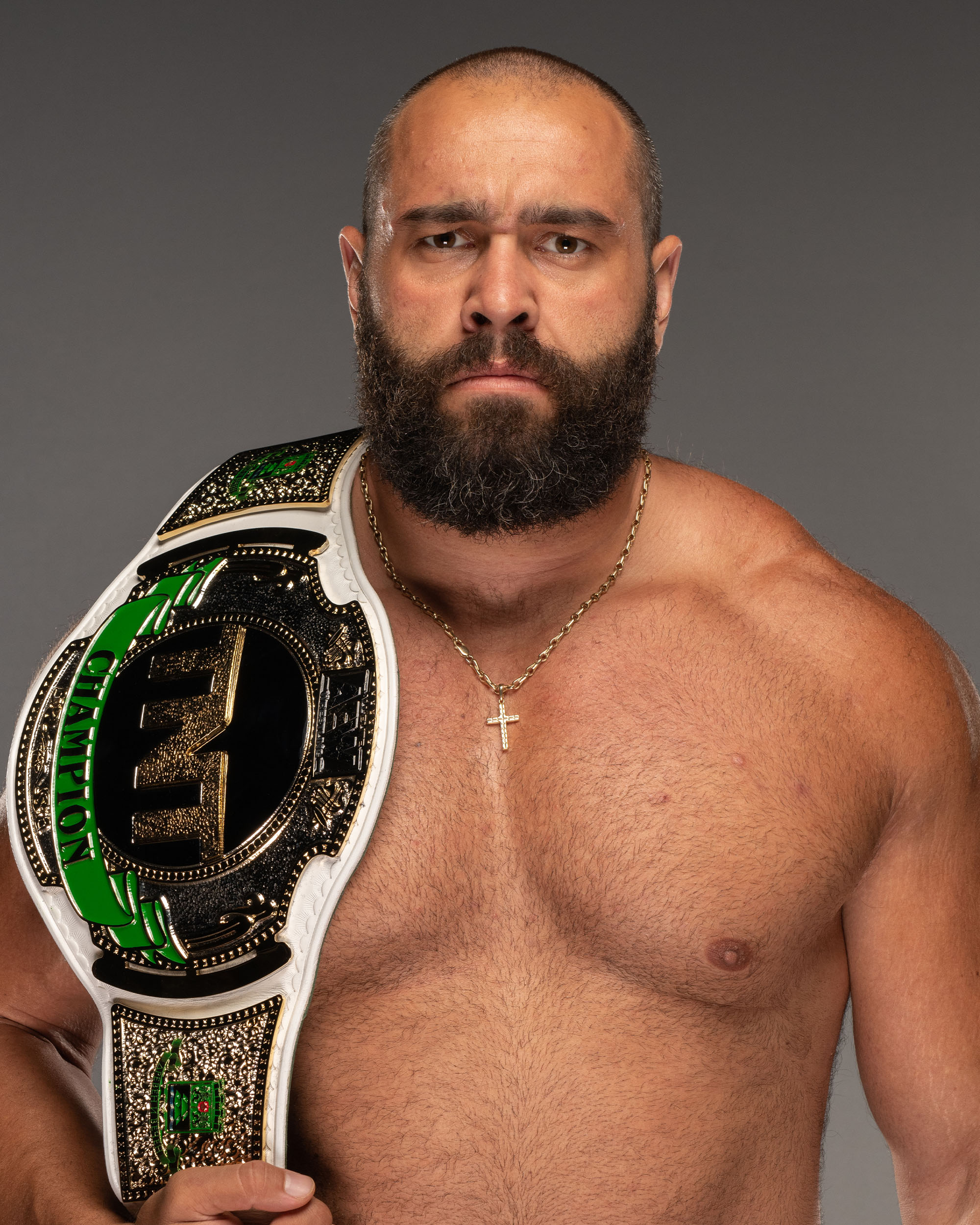
- Barnyashev in 2021

Personal information
- Born: Miroslav Petrov Barnyashev; 25 December 1985 (age 40) Plovdiv, Bulgaria
- Spouse: CJ Perry (m. 2016)

Professional wrestling career
- Ring name(s): Alexander Rusev; Miro; Miroslav; Miroslav Makarov; Rusev
- Billed height: 183 cm (6 ft 0 in)
- Billed weight: 138 kg (304 lb)
- Billed from: Bulgaria; Moscow, Russia
- Trained by: FCW; Gangrel; Rikishi
- Debut: November 22, 2008

Miroslav Petrov Barnyashev (Bulgarian: Мирослав Петров Барняшев, [miroˈslɑf pɛˈtrɔf bɑrˈnjɑʃɛf]; born 25 December 1985) is a Bulgarian and American professional wrestler and actor. As of April 2025, he is signed to WWE, where he performs on the Raw brand under the ring name Rusev. He is also known for his time in All Elite Wrestling (AEW) from 2020 to 2025, where he performed under the ring name Miro.

Barnyashev signed a contract with WWE in 2010 and was assigned to its developmental territory Florida Championship Wrestling (FCW), which was rebranded as NXT in 2012. He performed on NXT until 2014, when he and his manager Lana were moved to WWE's main roster. During his initial tenure in WWE, he was a three-time WWE United States Champion. He was released by WWE in 2020, joined AEW later that year, and went on to become a one-time AEW TNT Champion before returning to WWE in 2025.

== Early life ==
Miroslav Petrov Barnyashev was born on 25 December 1985 in Plovdiv, which was then part of the People's Republic of Bulgaria. He attended a sports school and later competed in powerlifting, rowing, and sambo.

== Professional wrestling career ==
=== Early career (2008–2010) ===
In the mid-2000s, aspiring to become a professional wrestler, Barnyashev left Bulgaria for the U.S. He originally lived in Virginia before relocating to Torrance, California, where he began training as a wrestler under Gangrel and Rikishi at the Knokx Pro Wrestling Academy. Barnyashev debuted in the San Diego, California-based independent promotion New Wave Pro Wrestling on November 22, 2008, under the ring name "Miroslav Makaraov", defeating Aerial Star. In 2010, Barnyashev joined the Santa Maria, California-based independent promotion Vendetta Pro Wrestling (VPW), shortening his ring name to "Miroslav". While wrestling for VPW, he was managed by Markus Mac.

=== World Wrestling Entertainment / WWE (2010–2020) ===
==== Developmental territories (2010–2014) ====
In September 2010, Barnyashev was signed to a contract by World Wrestling Entertainment (WWE). He was assigned to WWE's Florida Championship Wrestling (FCW) developmental territory in Tampa, Florida, where he adopted the ring name Alexander Rusev. He wrestled his first televised match on the July 17, 2011, episode of FCW, defeating Mike Dalton while being managed by Raquel Diaz. Shortly after debuting in FCW, Rusev tore both his anterior cruciate ligament and his meniscus and spent six months rehabilitating.

Rusev returned to FCW in March 2012 with Nick Rogers as his manager. In the summer of 2012, Rusev suffered a broken neck, temporarily paralyzing his arm. While rehabilitating, Barnyashev travelled to Thailand, where he studied the martial art Muay Thai. In August 2012, WWE rebranded FCW as NXT.

After his neck healed, Rusev made his NXT television debut on the May 29, 2013 episode, competing in a battle royal to determine the number one contender to the NXT Championship that was won by Bo Dallas. Rusev wrestled his first singles match on the August 21 edition of NXT, losing to Dolph Ziggler. Shortly thereafter, Rusev adopted Sylvester Lefort as his manager and formed a short-lived tag team with Scott Dawson named "The Fighting Legionnaires"; they feuded with the team of Enzo Amore and Colin Cassady. On the October 30 episode of NXT, Rusev ended his affiliation with Lefort by attacking him during a tag team bout.

Rusev proceeded to adopt Lana as his "social ambassador", a pairing compared by WWE to Ivan and Ludmilla Drago from the 1985 film Rocky IV. In matches taped before his main roster debut, Rusev defeated main roster wrestlers Kofi Kingston, Xavier Woods, and Sin Cara in singles matches, which aired on NXT in January and February. Rusev continued to appear sporadically on NXT after joining the main roster in April 2014, making his final appearance on July 24, getting disqualified against NXT Champion Adrian Neville in a non-title match.

==== United States Champion (2014–2015) ====
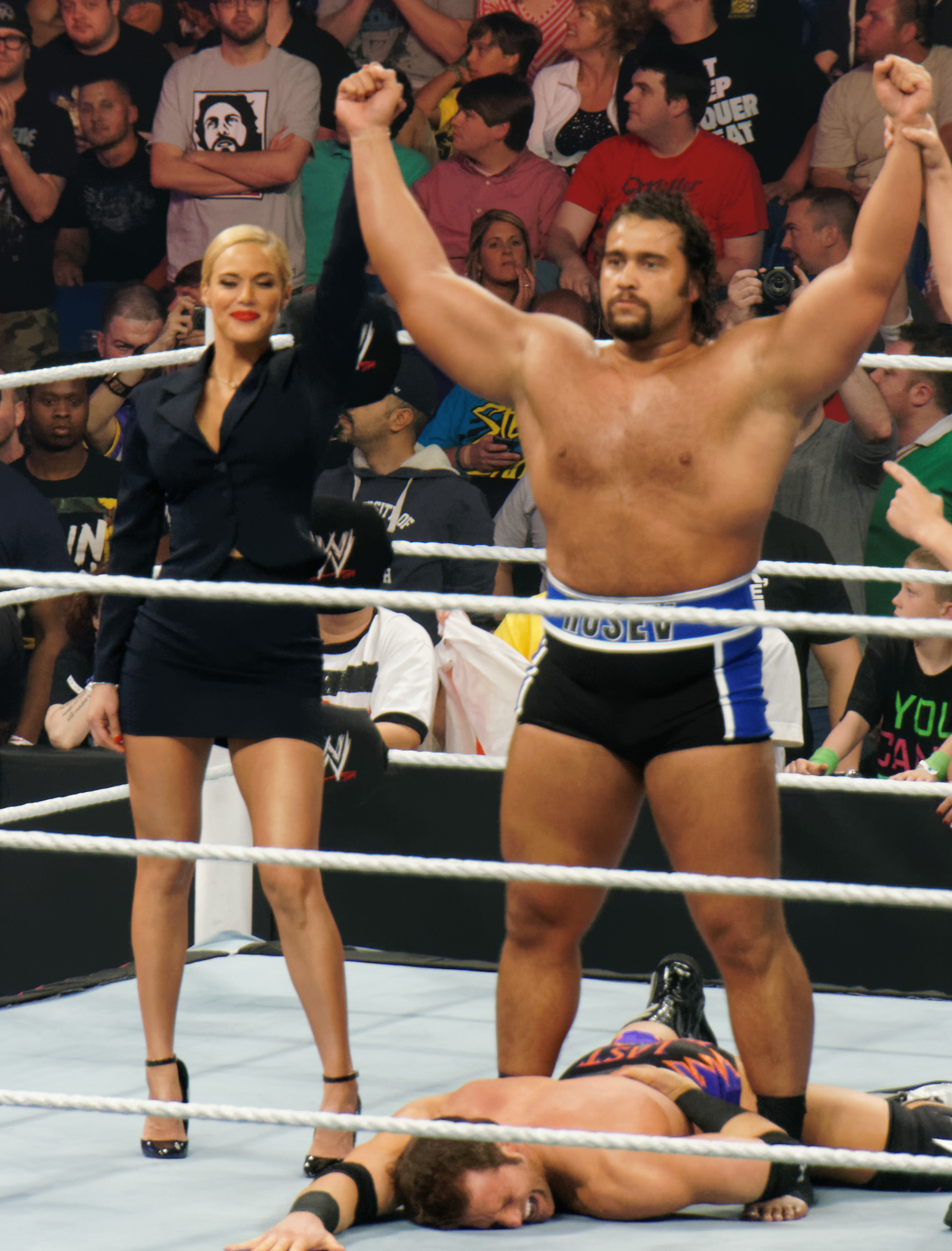
Rusev (right) celebrating a win with Lana in April 2014

Rusev made his main roster debut at the Royal Rumble on January 26, 2014, where he was the sixth entrant in the Royal Rumble match, where he was eliminated by the joint effort of four other wrestlers. After months of self-promotional videos and speeches by Rusev and his manager Lana, Rusev's return match on the main roster came on the April 7 episode of Raw, where he squashed Zack Ryder. In May, Rusev adopted a Russophillic, anti-American gimmick that saw him announced as having relocated to Russia, and as having been named "Hero of the Russian Federation". This angle brought Barnyashev much legitimate heat in his native Bulgaria. In the same month, his ring name was shortened to simply Rusev.

Over the next several months, Rusev feuded with Xavier Woods and R-Truth (whom Rusev defeated at Extreme Rules on May 4 in a two-on-one handicap match) and Big E (whom he defeated at Payback on June 1 and at Money in the Bank on June 29), Jack Swagger (whom he defeated at Battleground on July 20 and again at SummerSlam on August 17), Mark Henry (whom he defeated at Night of Champions on September 21) and Big Show (whom he defeated at Hell in a Cell on October 26). Lana dedicated Rusev's string of victories to President of Russia Vladimir Putin, drawing attention from the mainstream press – including The Washington Post and The Daily Beast – and criticism after she was interpreted as having referred to the crash of Malaysia Airlines Flight 17 before Rusev's match at Battleground in an attempt to generate heat. On the October 6 episode of Raw, Rusev and Lana were confronted by The Rock in a surprise appearance, with The Rock driving Rusev from the ring after a verbal exchange.

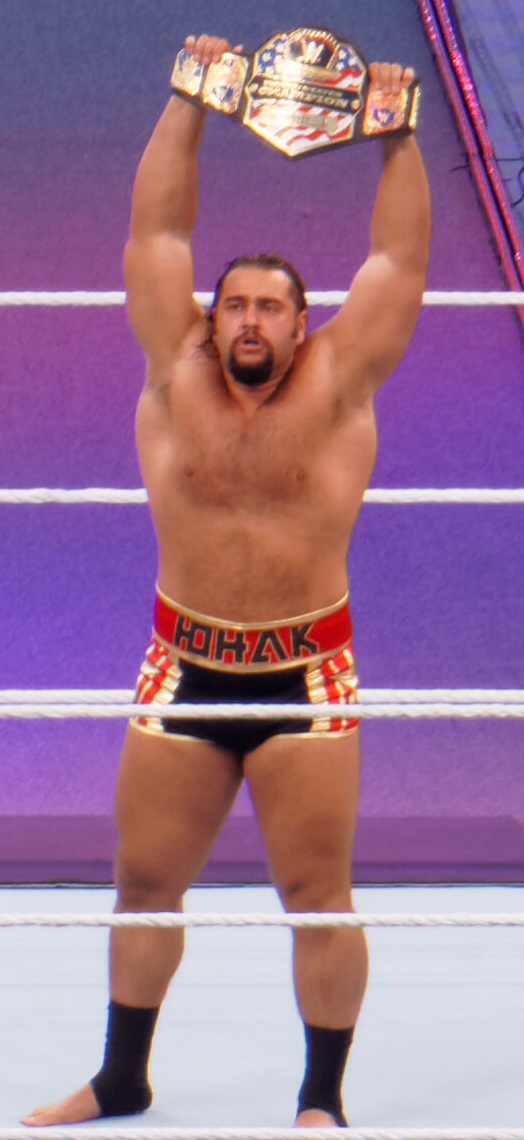
Rusev with the WWE United States Championship at WrestleMania 31.

On November 3, Rusev gained his first professional wrestling championship and became the first Bulgarian-born champion in WWE history when he won the United States Championship from Sheamus in a post-Raw match that aired on the WWE Network and proceeded to defeat him in a rematch via count-out. At Survivor Series on November 23, Rusev competed in a 10-man Survivor Series match as part of Team Authority but he was eliminated from the match by countout. Rusev and Jack Swagger once again feuded in December, leading to Rusev successfully defending the United States Championship against Swagger at TLC: Tables, Ladders & Chairs on December 14. At the Royal Rumble on January 25, 2015, Rusev entered the Royal Rumble match at number 15, eliminating six other contestants and placing second overall before being eliminated by Roman Reigns. At Fastlane on February 22, Rusev successfully defended the United States Championship in a bout with John Cena. Rusev lost the United States Championship to Cena in a rematch at WrestleMania 31 on March 29 after a miscommunication with Lana, ending his reign at 146 days and marking his first pinfall loss on WWE's main roster.

==== The League of Nations (2015–2016) ====
"It was six minutes of Rusev being punished on live national television for getting engaged to his longtime girlfriend ... [After] the cleanest job Rusev has ever done ... [Summer Rae] cut Vince McMahon's promo for him ... totally castrated [Rusev] ... How they get Rusev back on track as a killer after this segment is beyond me, which may have been the intent."

— Wrestling Observer analyst Jeff Hamlin describes the storyline breakup of Rusev and Summer Rae in 2015

Rusev failed to regain the championship the following month at Extreme Rules on April 26 in a Russian Chain match; during the match, Lana garnered a positive reaction from the crowd, leading to Rusev banishing her from ringside and causing dissension between the two. Rusev lost to Cena once more at Payback on May 17 in an "I Quit" match after Lana conceded the match on his behalf. The three pay-per-view losses in a row irreversibly damaged the air of power Rusev had built up, leading to TheSportster labeling it as a burial. On the May 18 episode of Raw, Rusev ended his affiliation with Lana, who slapped him in response. On the May 25 episode of Raw, Rusev reverted to being billed from Bulgaria and began carrying the flag of Bulgaria to ringside. Later that same evening, Rusev unsuccessfully attempted to reconcile with Lana. Three days later on SmackDown, Rusev suffered a fractured foot in a bout with Ryback, rendering him unable to compete in the Elimination Chamber match for the vacant Intercontinental Championship at Elimination Chamber on May 31. Despite his injury, Rusev still appeared on television and made further attempts to reconcile with Lana. Lana then began a storyline relationship with Dolph Ziggler, while Summer Rae began an alliance with Rusev. On the June 29 episode of Raw, Rusev and Rae confronted Lana and Ziggler, leading to a fight between Rae and Lana. On the July 6 episode of Raw, Rusev and Rae once again confronted the couple, which turned out to be a ruse, as Rusev viciously attacked Ziggler after hitting him with his crutch and removed his ankle brace, revealing that his foot injury had healed. The attack resulted in Ziggler sustaining a bruised trachea in storyline and out of action indefinitely.

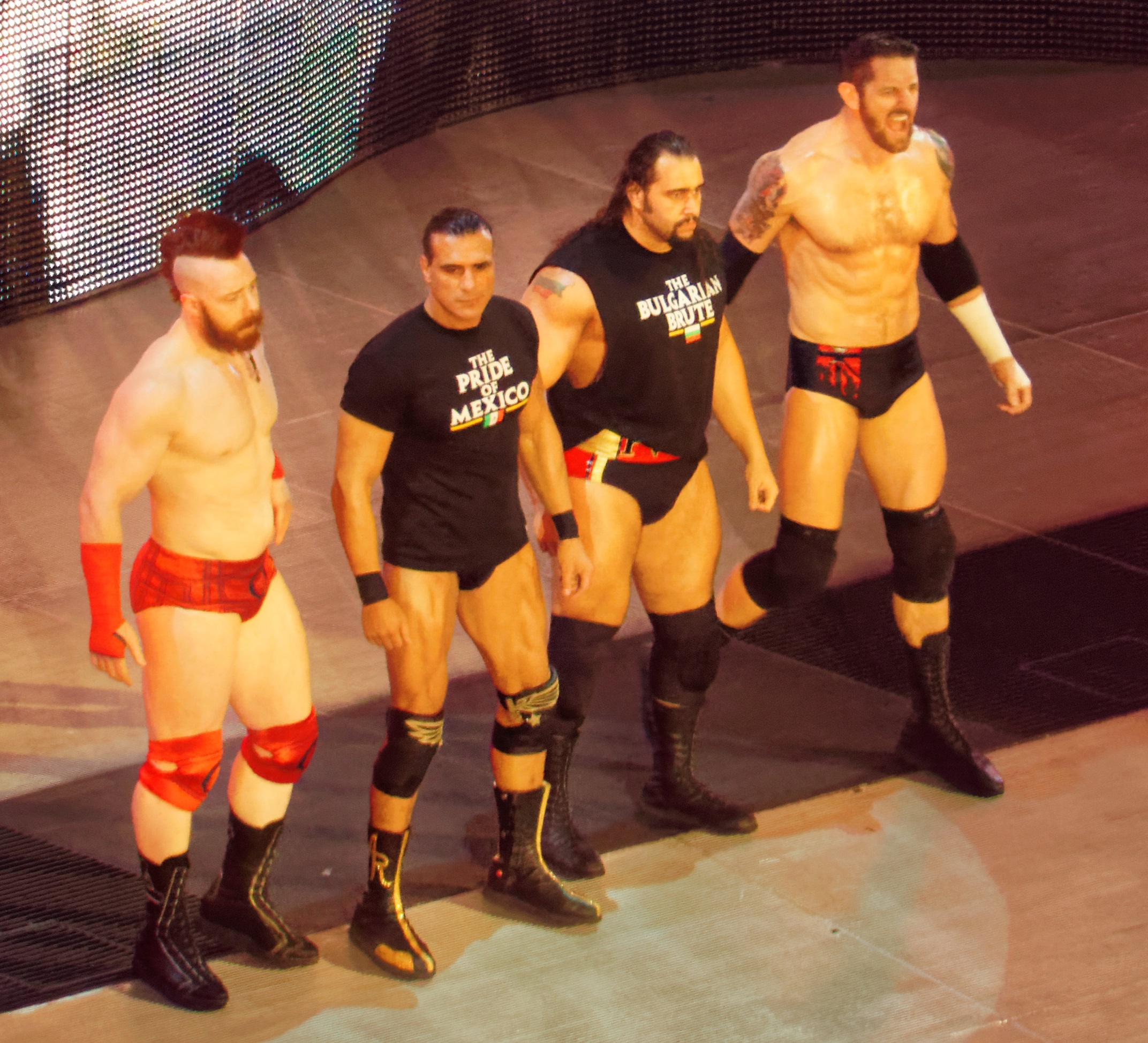
Rusev (second from right) as a member of The League of Nations in April 2016

Rusev made his in-ring return on the following SmackDown, wrestling in shoes to avoid further foot injury, defeating Fandango. On the July 13 episode of Raw, Rusev answered John Cena's United States Championship open challenge. Rusev was then interrupted by both Kevin Owens and Cesaro, who also demanded a shot at the title. This resulted in a triple threat match, where the winner would face Cena, which Rusev won after pinning Cesaro, as Owens had left the match early on. Afterwards, Rusev defeated Cena by disqualification, when Owens assaulted Rusev. On the July 16 episode of SmackDown, Rusev suffered his second loss by pinfall during his tenure on the WWE main roster when he was defeated by Cesaro in a singles match. On the August 17 episode of Raw, Ziggler returned and attacked Rusev. This altercation prompted a match between Rusev and Ziggler at SummerSlam on August 23, which ended in a double countout due to interference from Lana and Rae, and after the match, Rusev and Rae brawled with Ziggler and Lana. On the October 5 episode of Raw, Rae proposed to Rusev in the storyline, but said he would not marry her until he had won another championship. On October 11, TMZ reported that Rusev had become engaged to Lana in real life. Lana then confirmed the engagement and it began being used in the storyline on television, which resulted in Rae breaking up with him on the October 12 episode of Raw. The entire storyline circulating around the break-up of Rusev and Lana received extremely negative reviews, with many claiming the storyline damaged Rusev's gimmick. On the October 31 episode of Main Event, Rusev injured his bicep in a match with Neville, resulting in Neville winning the match via referee stoppage and Rusev being out of action.

Rusev returned on the November 23 episode of Raw, when he attacked Roman Reigns, and lost to him by disqualification after Sheamus and King Barrett attacked Reigns. A week later, on the November 30 episode of Raw, Lana returned to the WWE, once again as a villainess, and reconciled with Rusev, during a Miz TV segment, and later in the same night, the two joined Sheamus' new stable The League of Nations. Throughout December, Rusev started a feud with Ryback, with Lana faking injuries to distract Ryback and help Rusev gain advantage. At TLC: Tables, Ladders & Chairs on December 13, Rusev defeated Ryback by technical submission to end the feud. Also in November, Rusev joined forces with Sheamus, King Barrett and Alberto Del Rio forming The League of Nations. The faction aligned themselves with Mr. McMahon and continued to target WWE World Heavyweight Champion Roman Reigns. At the Royal Rumble on January 24, 2016, Rusev entered the Royal Rumble match at the No. 2 spot, but was eliminated by Roman Reigns in one and a half minutes. On the March 14 episode of Raw, Rusev and Del Rio failed to win the WWE Tag Team Championship from The New Day. At WrestleMania 32 on April 3, The League of Nations defeated The New Day, but after the match, The League of Nations was attacked by Mick Foley, Shawn Michaels and Stone Cold Steve Austin.

Following WrestleMania 32, on the April 4 episode of Raw, League of Nations members Sheamus and King Barrett were part of a losing effort against The New Day for the WWE Tag Team Championship after Barrett was pinned by Kofi Kingston, and following the match, Barrett was exiled from the group being called the "weak link", but moments after, The Wyatt Family went on to attack the remaining members of The League of Nations. On the April 28 episode of SmackDown, Rusev walked out on Sheamus after Del Rio walked out the both of them, thus disbanding The League of Nations.

==== Various feuds (2016–2017) ====
On the May 2 episode of Raw, Rusev won a battle royal by last eliminating Zack Ryder to become the No. 1 contender for the United States Championship, which he won for the second time by defeating Kalisto at Extreme Rules via submission. Rusev defeated him in a rematch on the following week's SmackDown, after which he was confronted by Titus O'Neil, whom Rusev defeated at Money in the Bank to successfully retain the title. Rusev followed this with a successful third title defense against Cesaro and defeated O'Neil on the July 4 episode of Raw to retain the title. Rusev was then challenged by Zack Ryder, whom he defeated at Battleground for another successful title defense. In the 2016 WWE draft, Rusev, along with Lana, was drafted to Raw, taking the United States Championship with him. He lost the title at Clash of Champions against Roman Reigns after 126 days. Rusev then received his rematch at the Hell in a Cell pay-per-view in a Hell in a Cell match, which he lost.

"Rusev has been quite the company man as of late, doing favors for many returning veterans while not being showcased the way he should be given his size, ring work, and ability on the mic. Knowing how talented Rusev is, it is hard to believe that he has failed to crack the main event picture during his WWE tenure."

— Mike Souza of Pro Wrestling Torch commenting on Rusev's lack of success in WWE in February 2017

On the November 21 episode of Raw, after being locked out of his locker room, Enzo Amore ran into Lana in the hallway before being angrily confronted by Rusev. Rusev challenged Amore to a match later that night, quickly defeating him. The following week on Raw, Amore defeated Rusev by disqualification. At Roadblock: End of the Line, Rusev faced Amore's tag partner, Big Cass, defeating him by countout. The following night on Raw, Rusev faced Cass again, this time defeating him by disqualification. That same night, Amore had to attend sensitivity training from the incident on the November 21 episode of Raw. At the training, Rusev and his new ally, Jinder Mahal, attacked Amore. On the January 2, 2017, episode of Raw, Rusev teamed with Mahal in a 2-on-1 handicap match, defeating Big Cass. At Royal Rumble, Rusev entered the Rumble match at number eighteen, lasting over 20 minutes before being eliminated by Goldberg. On the February 27 episode of Raw, Rusev and Mahal began to show tension after Rusev inadvertently distracted Mahal, causing the two to lose to The New Day. At Fastlane, general manager Mick Foley placed Rusev and Mahal in singles matches that night after Mahal revealed his desire to return to singles competition. Rusev and Mahal both lost their respective matches against Big Show and Cesaro. Both Rusev and Lana disappeared from television following Rusev requiring surgery for an injury.

==== Rusev Day (2017–2018) ====
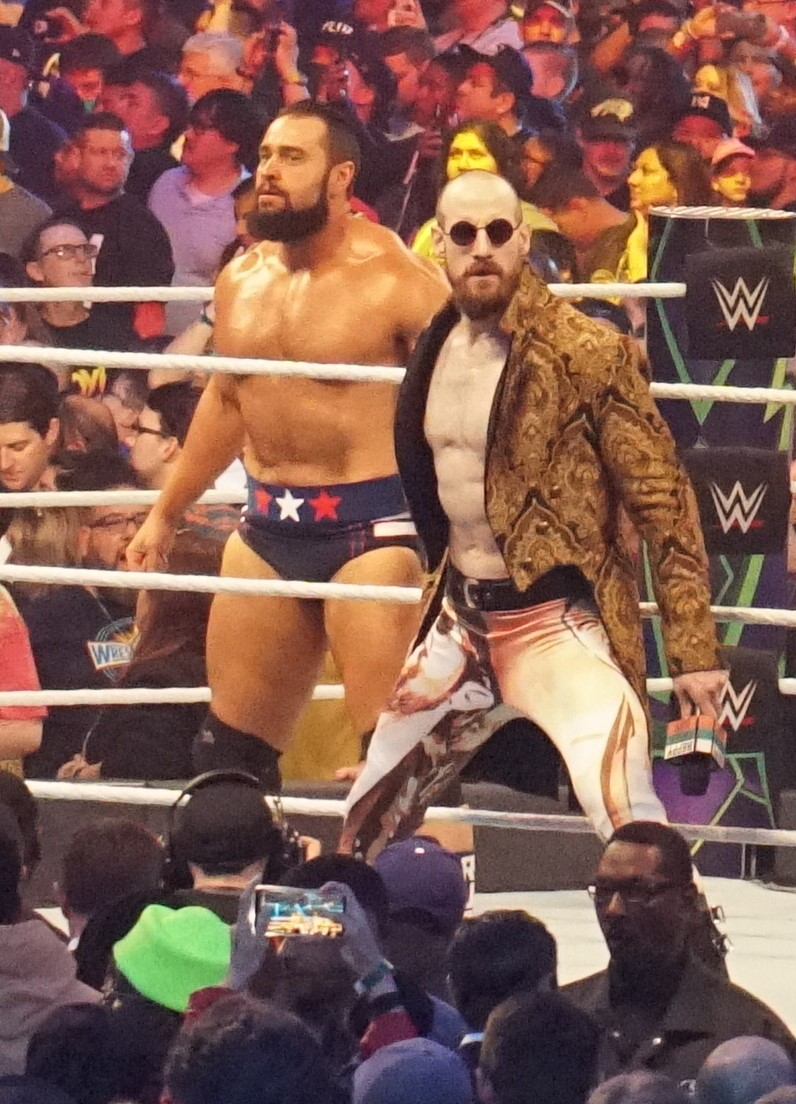
Rusev (back) with Aiden English at WrestleMania 34

On April 11, Rusev was moved to the SmackDown brand as part of the Superstar Shake-up. On the April 25 episode of SmackDown, Rusev made his first appearance on WWE programming since Fastlane, appearing via satellite, and declared that he would not make his debut on SmackDown unless he was given a WWE Championship match at the Money in the Bank pay-per-view on June 18. He was not granted his request, but on the July 4 episode of SmackDown, he made his first appearance for the brand and confronted the returning John Cena, setting up a flag match for Battleground, which he lost.

In August, Rusev started a feud with Randy Orton and was defeated by Orton at SummerSlam in 10 seconds. On the September 19 episode of SmackDown, Rusev got his revenge on Orton by defeating him in the same time, after a distraction from Aiden English. Soon after, Rusev assumed a new character where he proclaimed that every day was "Rusev Day". This act became incredibly popular with the fans, despite the fact that Rusev played a villainous character. As a result, WWE attempted to suppress positive feedback by editing out "Rusev Day" chants from crowds and reducing Rusev's appearances on television. At Hell in a Cell on October 9, Rusev lost to Orton again, thus ending their feud.

After his feud with Orton, Rusev began a team with English, with the two participating in a fatal four-way tag team match for the SmackDown Tag Team Championship at Clash of Champions in December also involving The New Day, Chad Gable and Shelton Benjamin and the champions The Usos, which The Usos won. Rusev entered the 2018 Royal Rumble match on January 28 as the first entrant, lasting over 30 minutes before being eliminated by Bray Wyatt and Matt Hardy. On the March 27 episode of SmackDown, Rusev teamed with Jinder Mahal to defeat Bobby Roode and Randy Orton, adding him to the United States Championship match at WrestleMania 34. At the event, Rusev was pinned by Mahal, losing the match. At the Greatest Royal Rumble event, he faced The Undertaker in a Casket Match, but lost. On the May 8 episode of SmackDown, Rusev defeated Daniel Bryan to qualify for the men's Money in the Bank ladder match at Money in the Bank, which was won by Braun Strowman. On the following episode of SmackDown, he won a gauntlet match to become the number one contender for AJ Styles' WWE Championship at Extreme Rules. At the event, he was defeated by Styles.

In July, Rusev Day started a feud with Andrade "Cien" Almas and Zelina Vega, thus turning them face in the process for the first time in his career. Rusev and Lana lost a mixed tag team match to Almas and Vega at SummerSlam but defeated them in a rematch on the August 21 episode of SmackDown. At Hell in a Cell, Rusev and English unsuccessfully faced The New Day for the SmackDown Tag Team Championship. On the following episode of SmackDown, English attacked Rusev, ending their alliance. English later claimed to have had an affair with Lana, leading to a match on the October 23 episode of SmackDown, where Rusev defeated English, ending their feud.

==== Final storylines and departure (2018–2020) ====
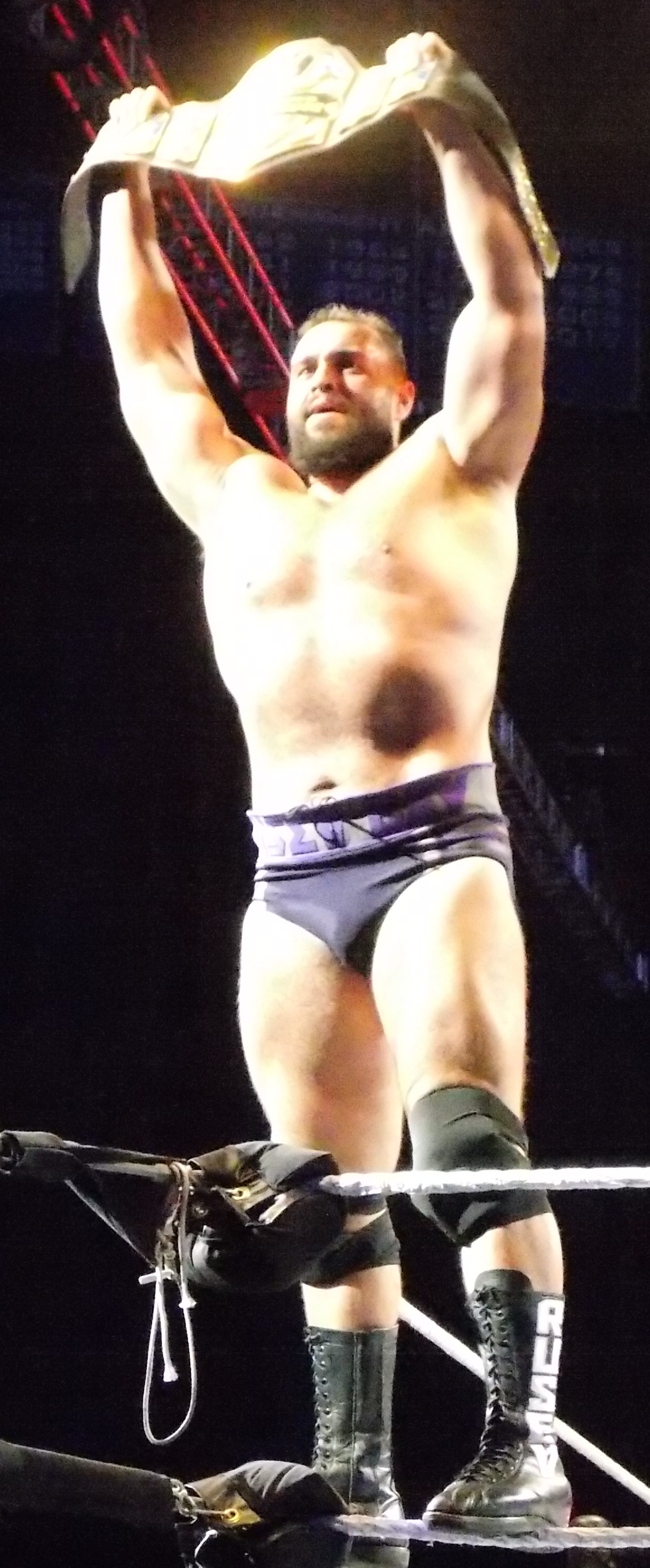
In December 2018, Rusev won his third WWE United States Championship.

After failing to win the United States Championship from Shinsuke Nakamura at Crown Jewel, Rusev finally managed to capture the United States Championship for a third time in his career on the December 25 episode of SmackDown Live. On January 27, 2019, he lost the title back to Nakamura on the Royal Rumble pre-show. Two days later on SmackDown Live, Rusev confronted R-Truth, who had just defeated Nakamura for the United States Championship, and pushed him into defending his newly won title against him, but Truth retained his title. After the match, Nakamura attacked Truth, and Rusev joined him in attacking Truth, thus turning heel again in the process and later forming a tag team with Nakamura. On the Fastlane pre-show, Rusev and Nakamura were defeated by The New Day. At WrestleMania 35, Nakamura and Rusev competed in a fatal four-way tag team match for the SmackDown Tag Team Championship, but were unsuccessful. Rusev competed in a 51-man battle royal at Super ShowDown, but failed to win. Following Super ShowDown, Rusev began a sabbatical from WWE.

Rusev returned on the September 16 episode of Raw as a face and was involved in a storyline where Lana was having an affair with Bobby Lashley. Seeking answers for Lana's infidelity, she accused Rusev of being a controlling sex addict, leading to the two divorcing on the December 9 episode of Raw, during which Rusev was attacked by Lashley. At the TLC: Tables, Ladders & Chairs pay-per-view event on December 15, Rusev lost to Lashley in a tables match, following interference from Lana. On the January 13, 2020, episode of Raw, Rusev lost to Lashley again following an interference from Lana and Liv Morgan, after the match, a mixed tag team match was scheduled between teams of Rusev and Morgan, and Lashley and Lana. The mixed tag team of Rusev and Morgan was defeated by Lashley and Lana in the January 20 episode of Raw. Rusev teamed with Humberto Carrillo in a loss to Lashley and Angel Garza on the February 17 episode of Raw. This was Rusev's final appearance in WWE in his first run, as on April 15, he was released from his WWE contract as part of budget cuts stemming from the COVID-19 pandemic. His real life wife Lana, however, remained with WWE until she was also released over a year later in June 2021.

=== All Elite Wrestling (2020–2025) ===
==== Alliance with Kip Sabian; TNT Champion (2020–2021) ====
Barnyashev, now known as Miro, debuted in All Elite Wrestling (AEW) on the September 9, 2020, episode of Dynamite, where he was revealed as Kip Sabian's best man for his upcoming wedding with Penelope Ford. Miro also took on the moniker of "The Best Man", claiming that he was the best at everything he does. On the September 23 episode of Dynamite, Miro made his in-ring debut, teaming with Sabian to defeat Joey Janela and Sonny Kiss. In October, Miro and Sabian began feuding with Best Friends (Chuck Taylor, Trent, and Orange Cassidy), after they accidentally destroyed the arcade game that Miro had purchased for Sabian as a wedding gift. On the November 4 episode of Dynamite, Miro had his first singles match in AEW, in which he defeated Trent. At the Beach Break event on February 3, 2021, Miro officiated Sabian and Ford's wedding, but the ceremony was crashed by Taylor and Cassidy. At the Revolution pay-per-view on March 7, Miro and Sabian defeated Cassidy and Taylor. However, on the March 31 episode of Dynamite, Miro and Sabian were defeated by Cassidy and Taylor in an Arcade Anarchy match, marking Miro's first loss in AEW. Following this, Miro attacked and brutalized Sabian to end their alliance. Miro then became more dominant and aggressive in his matches.

Miro then began a rivalry with Darby Allin, and defeated Allin on the May 12 episode of Dynamite to win the AEW TNT Championship. He defeated Lance Archer to retain the championship at the Double or Nothing event on May 30. He then made successful defenses against the likes of Evil Uno, Brian Pillman Jr., Lee Johnson, Fuego Del Sol, and Eddie Kingston at All Out.

During this time, Miro furthered his shift in gimmick by adopting the moniker of "God's Favorite Champion", utilising new entrance music, and thanking his dominance in matches to his God during interviews and promos. He also introduced a new championship belt, representing his hometown of Plovdiv; the black leather strap was changed to white, the red banner on the center plate was changed to green, and the inner side plates were changed to feature Plovdiv's coat of arms.

On September 29, Miro lost his TNT Championship against Sammy Guevara, ending his reign at 140 days. In subsequent promos, Miro aggressively questioned the motivation of his God.

==== Sporadic appearances and departure (2021–2025) ====
Miro returned on the November 3, 2021, episode of Dynamite, replacing Jon Moxley in a match against Orange Cassidy in the AEW World Championship Eliminator Tournament; he defeated Cassidy via submission, advancing to the finals of the tournament. At Full Gear, Miro lost to Bryan Danielson in the tournament final. In December, it was revealed that Miro was recovering from a hamstring injury. After a six-month hiatus due to injury and outside the ring projects, Miro made his return to AEW television on the June 1, 2022, edition of Dynamite, scoring a submission victory over Johnny Elite. At Forbidden Door on June 26, Miro competed in a fatal-four-way match against Pac, Clark Connors and Malakai Black determine the inaugural AEW All-Atlantic Champion, with Pac emerging victorious. At the All Out event in September, Miro teamed with Darby Allin and Sting to defeat House of Black in a six-man tag team match.

Following another lengthy absence, Miro made a return on the May 10, 2023 episode of Dynamite, where he walked into AEW CEO Tony Khan's office. Miro made his in-ring return on the premiere episode of Collision on June 17, defeating Tony Nese in a squash match. Afterwards, Miro started a feud with Powerhouse Hobbs, which led to a match at All Out, where Miro defeated Hobbs. After the match, Hobbs continued to attack Miro only to be saved by the debuting CJ (Miro's wife, formerly known as Lana in WWE). On December 30 at Worlds End, Miro defeated Andrade El Idolo with the assistance of CJ in what would be his final AEW match. After that event, Miro went on another hiatus to recover from an injury he had suffered in September 2023. In September 2024, it was reported that Miro had requested his release from AEW, having only wrestled eleven matches since 2021. In February 2025, Miro was reported to have departed AEW. He wrestled his first match in over a year later that month at Qatar Pro Wrestling's event Super Slam III in Doha, losing to Alberto El Patron by disqualification.

=== Return to WWE (2025–present) ===
Barnyashev, reverting to his Rusev name, made his return to WWE on the April 21, 2025 episode of Raw, attacking Alpha Academy. On the May 5 episode of Raw, Rusev made his in-ring return, defeating Otis. He then started a feud with Sheamus, culminating in an "Old Fashioned Donnybrook Brawl" at Clash in Paris in August 2025 where Rusev defeated Sheamus via submission. At the Royal Rumble in January 2026, Rusev entered the match at #5, being eliminated by Oba Femi after 32 seconds.

== Professional wrestling style and persona ==
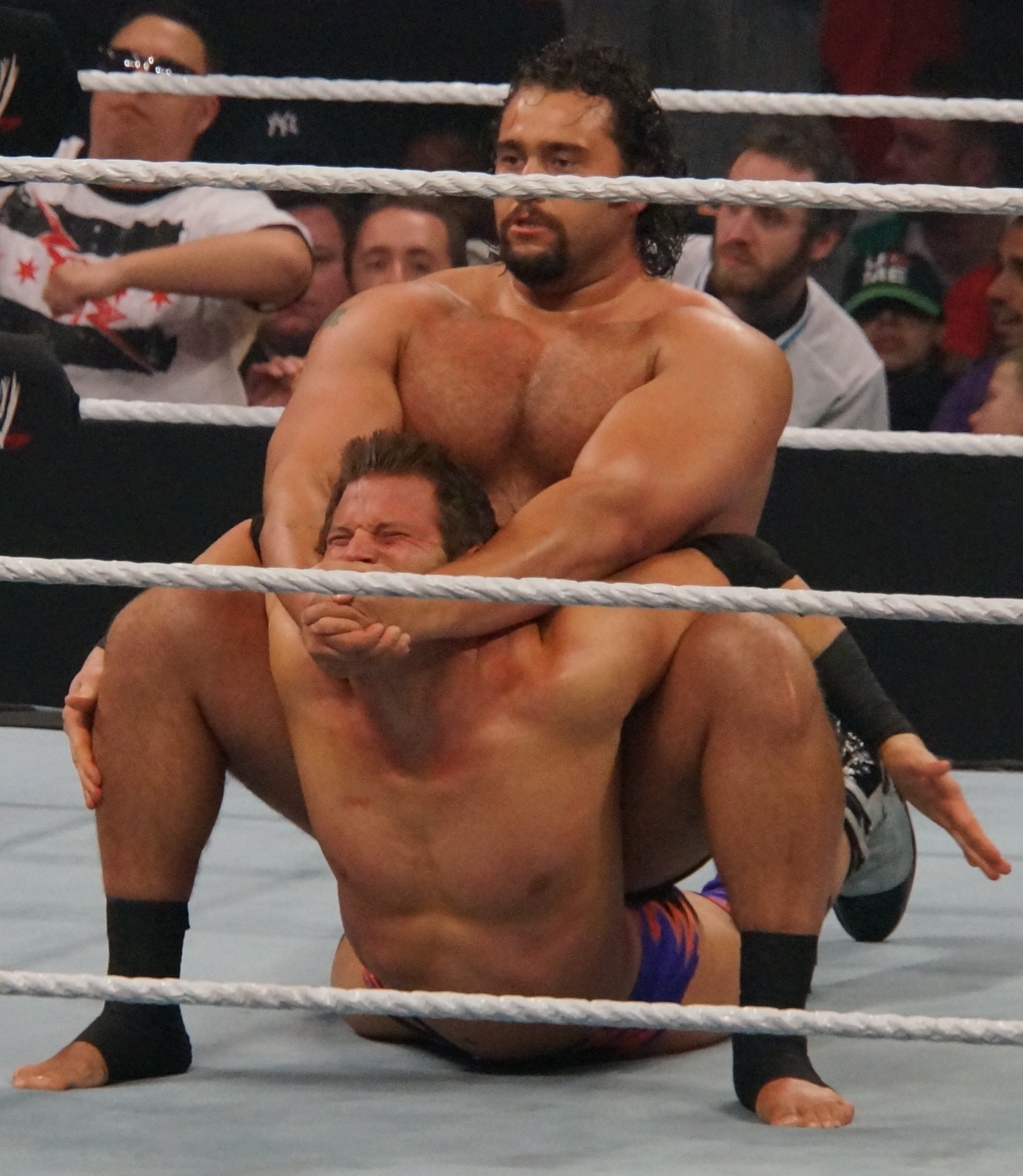
Barnyashev (top) (as "Rusev") applying "The Accolade" / "Game Over" (a camel clutch) to Zack Ryder in 2014.

Early in his career, Barnyashev's finishing move was the "Bulplex", an Oklahoma roll transitioned into a release German suplex. Beginning in 2013, he began using "The Accolade" (a camel clutch); upon moving to AEW in 2020, he changed the name of the move to "Game Over". In 2014, he introduced the Machka Kick, a jumping savate kick.

For the early part of his career, Barnyashev portrayed a villainous foreigner billed from Bulgaria or Russia. He nicknamed himself the "Bashing Bulgarian" and the "Bulgarian Brute" and, for a period of time, used the Bulgarian national anthem as his entrance theme. From 2017, he began portraying a more heroic character who declared every day to be a public holiday called "Rusev Day".

Upon debuting in AEW in 2020, Barnyashev changed his ring name to "Miro", adopting the nickname of the "Best Man". After winning the AEW TNT Championship, he became a villainous character once more, adopted the nicknames "The Redeemer" and "God's Favorite Champion", and changed his gimmick to that of a violent man with a god complex.

== Other media ==
Miro

Twitch information
- Channel: MIROtwch
- Years active: 2020–present
- Genre: Gaming
- Followers: 81,000

YouTube information
- Channel: ToBeMiroTV
- Years active: 2020–present
- Genre: Gaming
- Subscribers: 162,000
- Views: 8 million
- Last updated: July 4, 2023

Barnyashev, along with other Vendetta Pro Wrestling (VPW) wrestlers, appeared in the music video for the song "The Whole F'n Show" by Kushinator (the entrance music of wrestler Rob Van Dam).

As Rusev, he is a playable character in the video games WWE 2K15, WWE 2K16, WWE 2K17, WWE 2K18, WWE 2K19, and WWE 2K20.

In 2016, Barnyashev appeared as himself in Season 6 of the reality series Total Divas, as well as the WWE film Countdown and the animated film Scooby-Doo! and WWE: Curse of the Speed Demon.

After his release from WWE in April 2020, Barnyashev began hosting a streaming channel on Twitch, as well as a YouTube channel, under the name "Miro", shortened from his real name Miroslav. "Miro" would also become his ring name in AEW when he debuted for the promotion in September 2020.

Barnyashev appeared in the 2025 film Guns Up.

== Personal life ==
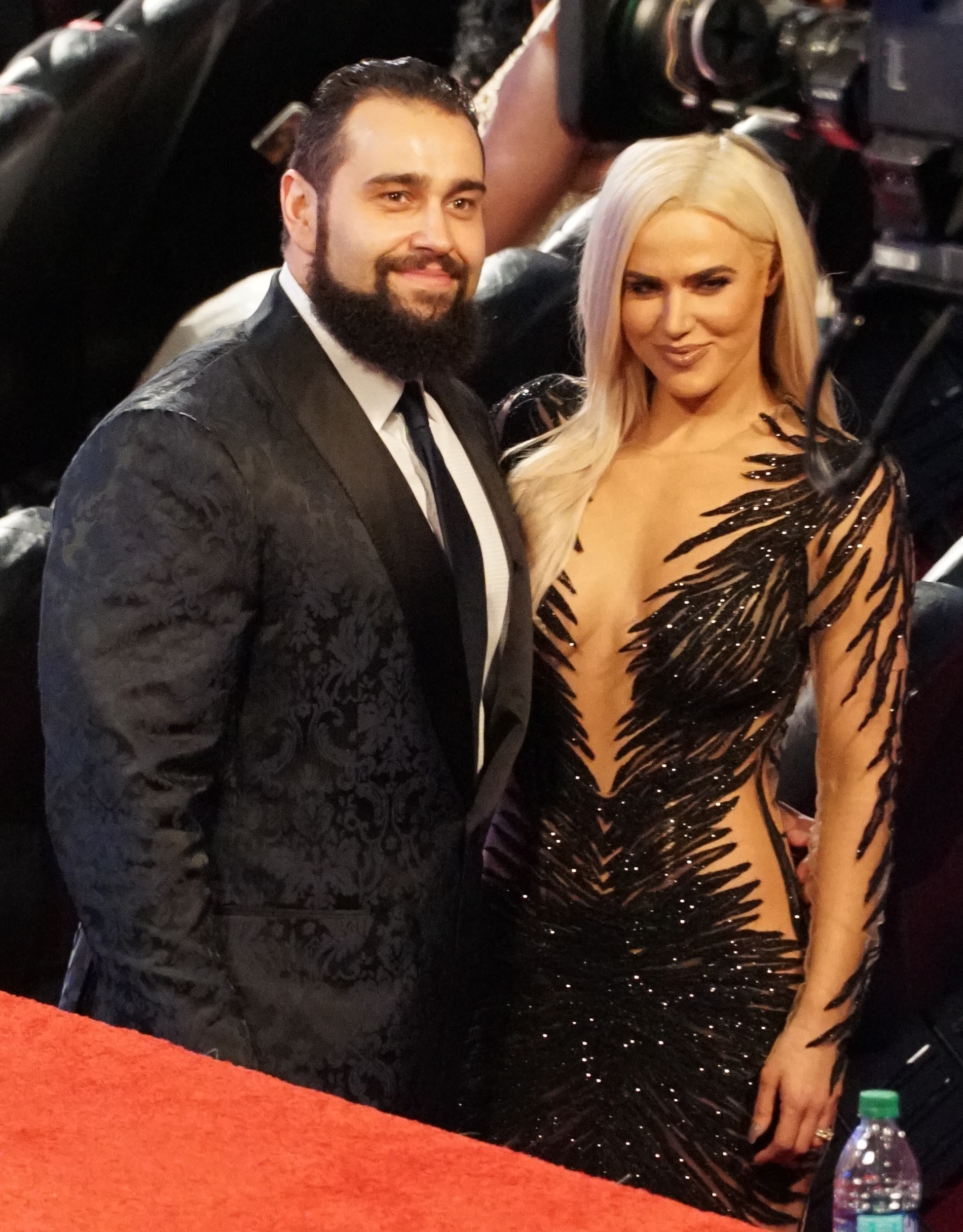
Barnyashev and his wife CJ Perry in April 2018

Barnyashev met American model and actress CJ Perry when she began portraying Lana, his WWE character's manager, and they were married on July 29, 2016. They separated in late 2023, but reconciled in early 2025. The couple announced in October 2026 that they were expecting a child.

Miro is a supporter of his hometown football team PFC Lokomotiv Plovdiv and Spanish football team Real Madrid CF. He is also one of three co-owners of the indoor football team FCF Beasts, alongside American football player Marshawn Lynch and basketball player Renee Montgomery.

In 2017, Barnyashev was presented the key to the city in his hometown of Plovdiv.

Barnyashev gained American citizenship on September 27, 2019.

== Filmography ==
=== Film ===
Year	Title	Role	Notes
2016	Countdown	Himself	
2016	Scooby-Doo! and WWE: Curse of the Speed Demon	Himself	Voice
2018	Another Version Of You	Kiril	Gwyneth's ex-boyfriend
2025	Guns Up	Harry the hammer	

=== Television ===
Year	Title	Role	Notes
2016	Sisters the Series	Boyfriend	Episode: “Boyfriend”
2016–2018	Total Divas	Himself	Recurring (seasons 6–8)
2022	East New York	Nickie Dushkin	Episode: "Pilot"
2023	Only You: An Animated Shorts Collection	Dad (voice)	Episode: “Yellowbird”

=== Web ===
Year	Title	Role	Notes
2015–2020	UpUpDownDown	Himself/Roman Reigns/Tong Po	Regular appearances
2016	Sisters the Series	Boyfriend	Episode: "Boyfriend"

== Championships and accomplishments ==
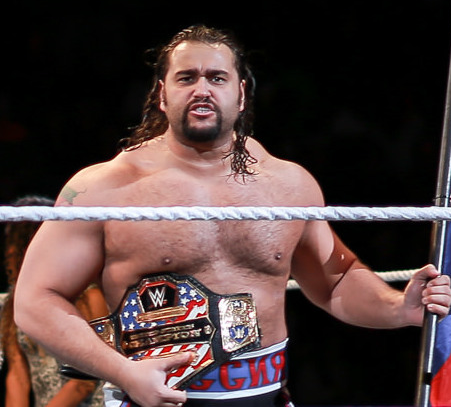
In WWE, Barnyashev was a three-time United States Champion...

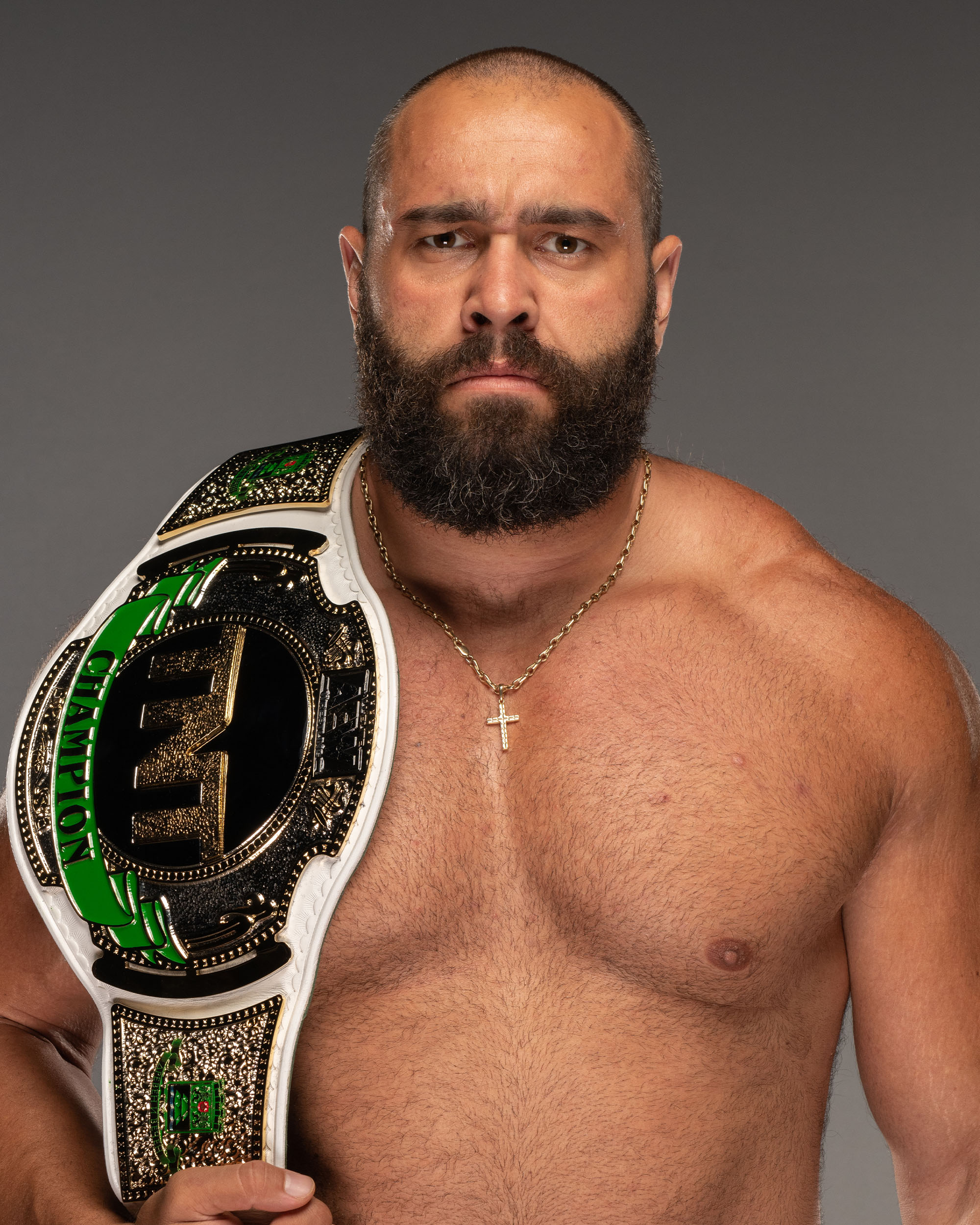
...and upon joining AEW, he became a one-time TNT Champion.

- All Elite Wrestling
  - AEW TNT Championship (1 time)
- Pro Wrestling Illustrated
  - Most Improved Wrestler of the Year (2014)
  - Ranked No. 8 of the top 500 singles wrestlers in the PWI 500 in 2015
- Rolling Stone
  - Worst Storyline (2015) - with Dolph Ziggler, Summer Rae and Lana
- WrestleCrap
  - Gooker Award (2015) - feud with Dolph Ziggler, Summer Rae and Lana
- Wrestling Observer Newsletter
  - Best Gimmick (2014) – with Lana
  - Most Improved (2014)
  - Most Underrated (2017)
- WWE
  - WWE United States Championship (3 times)
  - Slammy Award for Match of the Year (2014) – Team Cena vs. Team Authority at Survivor Series
