= Opus (film) =

2025 film by Mark Anthony Green

- Theatrical release poster
- Directed by: Mark Anthony Green
- Written by: Mark Anthony Green
- Produced by: Mark Anthony Green; Josh Bachove; Poppy Hanks; Jelani Johnson; Collin Creighton; Brad Weston
- Starring: Ayo Edebiri; John Malkovich; Juliette Lewis; Murray Bartlett; Amber Midthunder; Tatanka Means; Young Mazino; Stephanie Suganami; Tamera Tomakili; Tony Hale
- Cinematography: Tommy Maddox-Upshaw
- Edited by: Ernie Gilbert
- Music by: Danny Bensi (score); Saunder Jurriaans (score); Nile Rodgers (music); The-Dream (music)
- Production companies: MACRO Media; Makeready
- Distributed by: A24
- Release dates: January 27, 2025 (Sundance); March 14, 2025 (United States)
- Running time: 104 minutes
- Country: United States
- Language: English
- Budget: $10 million
- Box office: $2.2 million

Opus is a 2025 American thriller film written and directed by Mark Anthony Green in his feature directorial debut and starring Ayo Edebiri, John Malkovich, Juliette Lewis, Murray Bartlett, Amber Midthunder, Tatanka Means, Young Mazino, Stephanie Suganami, Tamera Tomakili, and Tony Hale. It tells the story of a journalist who is among those invited by a legendary pop music superstar to his Utah compound as dangerous things happen there as part of the superstar's twisted plan.

Opus premiered at the Sundance Film Festival on January 27, 2025, and was theatrically released by A24 on March 14, 2025. The film received negative reviews from critics and has grossed $2.2 million at the box office.

== Plot ==
Pop superstar Alfred Moretti causes a media frenzy by announcing his first new album in 30 years. He invites six guests to a listening party at his Utah compound: journalists Stan Sullivan and Ariel Ecton, talk show host Clara Armstrong, influencer Emily Katz, paparazza Bianca Tyson, and radio shock jock Bill Lotto. Their invitations include assorted merchandise, the new album, and a book.

At the compound, their electronic devices are collected by a staff of cultists dressed in denim uniforms. Moretti professes to simply be a member of the Levelists, who believe in the book given to each of the guests. Ariel is put off by the atmosphere, while the other guests are thrilled to be in Moretti's presence.

Each guest is assigned a Levelist as a "concierge". Belle is Ariel's concierge, and instead of tending to her needs, she surveils Ariel constantly. As Bill unwinds with a massage, he is attacked and is not seen the next day. The Levelists insists Bill is fine and just resting.

Ariel discusses ideology with Moretti. When she asks what Levelists do, he shows her a cultist shucking oysters. Moretti explains they all search for pearls to make into necklaces. During the "Fashioning" segment of the schedule, Ariel is given a makeover and forced into having her pubic hair shaved. The other guests laugh it off awkwardly, and they are taken to watch Moretti perform a song.

During the show, Emily has a debilitating coughing fit and is taken away. Afterward, Ariel raises the alarm about the Levelists' controlling behavior and the disappearance of Emily and Bill. Stan is busy dismissing her concerns when he is shot in the shoulder with an arrow by a young Levelist who apologizes profusely.

Ariel sneaks away from Belle and finds the guests' phones stored in a taxidermy facility. They have been rendered useless. She is too distressed to notice Bill's decapitated corpse nearby. She packs her things and asks to leave. Moretti convinces Ariel to attend a puppet show while she waits for the bus to take her home. The guests are seated in beanbag chairs and made to watch a puppet of Billie Holiday interviewed by paparazzi rats.

Ariel is startled when her chair moves. Eventually, Emily claws her way out of it. Her tongue is horrifically swollen, and Moretti finally admits to poisoning her. The Levelists attack the guests, killing Stan and Bianca. Ariel flees to a replica of Moretti's childhood home. Bill's head is mounted on a wall. She also finds cyanide and champagne. Belle tracks Ariel down and overpowers her.

Ariel regains consciousness at a ritual where the Levelists drink champagne. Clara is killed, but one of the cultists frees Ariel, who escapes. When she returns with the police, Moretti is calmly playing the piano surrounded by the corpses of his five guests.

Two years later, Ariel's book about her experience is a bestseller. The Levelists' bodies have not been found, and Moretti is serving several life sentences for the murders of his guests. He summons Ariel to an interview where he reveals the Levelists are all alive and well and spread throughout society. Ariel was deliberately allowed to escape the ritual, and in fact the entire point of the massacre was to kill a bunch of people in front of Ariel so she'd write a book about it that would inadvertently proselytize Levelism.

Ariel is later seen guest starring on a talk show. Just as the host asks her a question about her book, she notices that she was wearing one of the pearl necklaces, indicating her being a Levelist also. Ariel is stunned.

== Cast ==
- Ayo Edebiri as Ariel Ecton, a journalist
- John Malkovich as Alfred Moretti, 1990s pop superstar
- Juliette Lewis as Clara Armstrong, a talk show host
- Murray Bartlett as Stan Sullivan, Ariel's boss
- Melissa Chambers as Bianca Tyson, a paparazza
- Tony Hale as Soledad Yusef
- Stephanie Suganami as Emily Katz, an influencer
- Mark Sivertsen as Bill Lotto, radio shock jock
- Amber Midthunder as Belle, a Levelist
- Tatanka Means as Najee
- Tamera Tomakili as Rachel Malick
- Young Mazino as Kent
- Rosario Dawson as the Billie Holiday puppet (voice)

Additionally, Lil Nas X and Lenny Kravitz have uncredited appearances as Moretti fans, while Bill Burr and Wolf Blitzer appear as themselves. Ryan Cowles, Tristan Manyhorses, and Sean McCormick are the puppeteers for the puppet show.

== Production ==
Opus was written and directed by Mark Anthony Green in his feature directorial debut. Filming began in Pojoaque, New Mexico in November 2023.

== Music ==
The film features original music written by Nile Rodgers and The-Dream. An EP of Moretti's songs was released to coincide with the film, titled Opus: The Moretti EP. John Malkovich sang for the recordings.

== Release ==
Opus premiered in the Midnight section at the 2025 Sundance Film Festival on January 27, 2025; and was released on March 14, 2025, by A24.

The film became available to stream on HBO Max beginning July 11, 2025.

== Reception ==
=== Box office ===
In the United States and Canada, Opus was released alongside Novocaine, Black Bag, The Last Supper, and The Day the Earth Blew Up: A Looney Tunes Movie, and was projected to gross $2–4 million from 1,764 theaters in its opening weekend. The film made $433,000 on its first day, including an estimated $150,000 from Thursday night previews. It went on to debut to just $1 million, finishing outside the top 10. The following weekend the film made $282,521 (a drop of 72.7%), falling to 17th.

=== Critical response ===
On the review aggregator website Rotten Tomatoes, 39% of 137 critics' reviews are positive. The website's consensus reads: "John Malkovich is clearly having a ball playing a nefarious pop musician, but unfortunately the rest of Opus is too conceptually confused for the star's fun to be infectious." Metacritic, which uses a weighted average, assigned the film a score of 42 out of 100, based on 36 critics, indicating "mixed or average" reviews. Audiences polled by CinemaScore gave the film an average grade of "C+" on an A+ to F scale, while those surveyed by PostTrak gave it an 64% overall positive score, with 44% saying they would "definitely recommend" it.

== Accolades ==
Award / Festival	Date of ceremony	Category	Recipient(s)	Result	Ref.
Sitges Film Festival	19 October 2025	Best Feature Film	Opus	Nominated	
NAACP Image Awards	February 28, 2026	Outstanding Independent Motion Picture	Opus	Nominated	
