= Winning Time: The Rise of the Lakers Dynasty =

American sports drama television series

- Season 1 title card
- Also known as: Winning Time: The Rise of the Lakers Dynasty II (s. 2)
- Genre: Biographical drama; Comedy-drama; Sports drama
- Created by: Max Borenstein; Jim Hecht
- Based on: Showtime by Jeff Pearlman
- Starring: John C. Reilly; Quincy Isaiah; Jason Clarke; Adrien Brody; Gaby Hoffmann; Tracy Letts; Jason Segel; Julianne Nicholson; Hadley Robinson; DeVaughn Nixon; Solomon Hughes; Tamera Tomakili; Brett Cullen; Stephen Adly Guirgis; Spencer Garrett; Sarah Ramos; Molly Gordon; Joey Brooks; Delante Desouza; Jimel Atkins; Austin Aaron; Jon Young; Thomas Mann; McCabe Slye; Rob Morgan; Sally Field; Michael Chiklis
- Music by: Nicholas Britell (s. 1); Jeff Beal (s. 2); Robert Glasper
- Opening theme: "My Favorite Mutiny" by The Coup
- Country of origin: United States
- Original language: English
- No. of seasons: 2
- No. of episodes: 17

Production
- Executive producers: Adam McKay; Kevin Messick; Max Borenstein; Scott Stephens; Jim Hecht; Jason Shuman; Rodney Barnes; Salli Richardson (s. 2); Peter Feldman
- Producers: Doug Ornstein; Bruce Dunn
- Cinematography: Todd Banhazl; Mihai Mălaimare Jr.
- Editors: Hank Corwin; Jeremy Weinstein; Jessica Hernández; Max Koepke; Felicia M. Livingston; Juliana Rodzinski
- Running time: 54–59 minutes
- Production companies: HBO Entertainment; Steeplechase Amusements; Jim Hecht Productions; Hyperobject Industries; Jason Shuman Productions

Original release
- Network: HBO
- Release: March 6, 2022 – September 17, 2023

Winning Time: The Rise of the Lakers Dynasty is an American sports drama television series created by Max Borenstein and Jim Hecht for HBO, based on the book Showtime: Magic, Kareem, Riley, and the Los Angeles Lakers Dynasty of the 1980s by Jeff Pearlman. The first season, comprising 10 episodes, chronicles the 1980s Showtime era of the Los Angeles Lakers basketball team (beginning in late 1979), featuring notable NBA stars Magic Johnson and Kareem Abdul-Jabbar. It features an ensemble cast led by John C. Reilly, Jason Clarke, Jason Segel, Gaby Hoffmann, Rob Morgan, and Adrien Brody. The series premiered on March 6, 2022, with the pilot episode directed by Adam McKay. In April 2022, the series was renewed for a second season, which premiered on August 6, 2023. On September 17, 2023, it was announced that the series was canceled after two seasons.

Although HBO has reinforced that the series is a dramatization, the series has been strongly criticized by several former NBA players and basketball historians over what they allege are significant factual inaccuracies within the storylines. Multiple players and staff from that time claimed the show was false and interpreted certain storylines and personalities wrong, such as the nature of the relationship between Kareem Abdul-Jabbar and Spencer Haywood, or the mischaracterization of Jerry West.

== Premise ==
The series is a dramatization of the professional and personal lives of the 1980s Los Angeles Lakers basketball teams. The first season focuses on the 1979–1980 NBA season, Jerry Buss' first as owner and Magic Johnson's rookie year. The second season takes place between 1980 and 1984.

== Cast ==
=== Main ===
- John C. Reilly as Jerry Buss
- Quincy Isaiah as Magic Johnson
- Jason Clarke as Jerry West
- Adrien Brody as Pat Riley
- Gaby Hoffmann as Claire Rothman
- Tracy Letts as Jack McKinney (season 1; guest season 2)
- Jason Segel as Paul Westhead
- Julianne Nicholson as Cranny McKinney (season 1)
- Hadley Robinson as Jeanie Buss
- DeVaughn Nixon as Norm Nixon
- Solomon Hughes as Kareem Abdul-Jabbar
- Tamera Tomakili as Earletha "Cookie" Kelly
- Spencer Garrett as Chick Hearn
- Sarah Ramos as Cheryl Pistono (season 1; recurring season 2)
- Molly Gordon as Linda Zafrani
- Brett Cullen as Bill Sharman
- Stephen Adly Guirgis as Frank Mariani
- Delante Desouza as Michael Cooper
- Jimel Atkins as Jamaal Wilkes
- Austin Aaron as Mark Landsberger
- Joey Brooks as Lon Rosen
- Jon Young as Brad Holland (season 1)
- Rob Morgan as Earvin Johnson Sr.
- Sally Field as Jessie Buss (season 1)
- Gillian Jacobs as Chris Riley (season 2; recurring season 1)
- Thomas Mann as Johnny Buss (season 2; guest season 1)
- McCabe Slye as Jimmy Buss (season 2; guest season 1)
- Michael Chiklis as Red Auerbach (season 2; recurring season 1)

=== Recurring ===
- LisaGay Hamilton as Christine Johnson
- Michael O'Keefe as Jack Kent Cooke
- Kate Arrington as JoAnn Mueller
- Sean Patrick Small as Larry Bird
- David Purdham as Larry O'Brien
- Kirk Bovill as Donald Sterling
- Rickey Eugene Brown as Quincy Johnson
- Darone Okolie as Larry Johnson
- Andy Hirsch as David Stern
- Lola Kirke as Karen West
- Rachel Hilson as Cindy Day
- Steve Harris as Dr. Thomas Day
- Carter Redwood as Brian
- Lucy Walters as Beverly
- Rory Cochrane as Jerry Tarkanian
- Danny Burstein as Vic Weiss
- Ta'Nika Gibson as Debbie Allen
- Terence Davis as Adrian Dantley
- Rodney Barnes as Maurice
- Nell Sherman as Maude
- Newton Mayenge as Jim Chones
- Wood Harris as Spencer Haywood
- Edwin Hodge as Ron Boone
- Ja'Quan Cole as Ron Carter
- Jynediah Gittens as Kenny Carr
- Michael AG Scott as Butch Lee
- Mike Epps as Richard Pryor
- Max E. Williams as Jack Nicholson
- Carina Conti as Paula Abdul
- Mariama Diallo as Iman
- Orlando Jones as Elgin Baylor
- James Lesure as Julius Erving
- Ari Graynor as Honey Kaplan (season 2)

== Episodes ==
=== Series overview ===
| Season | Episodes | Originally released | |
| Season | Episodes | First released | Last released |
|---|---|---|---|
| 1 | 10 | March 6, 2022 | May 8, 2022 |
| 2 | 7 | August 6, 2023 | September 17, 2023 |

=== Season 1 (2022) ===
| No. overall | No. in season | Title | Directed by | Written by | Original release date | U.S. viewers (millions) |
|---|---|---|---|---|---|---|
| 1 | 1 | "The Swan" | Adam McKay | Story by : Max Borenstein & Jim Hecht; Teleplay by : Max Borenstein | March 6, 2022 | 0.256 |
| 2 | 2 | "Is That All There Is?" | Jonah Hill | Rodney Barnes & Max Borenstein | March 13, 2022 | 0.337 |
| 3 | 3 | "The Good Life" | Damian Marcano | Max Borenstein & Rodney Barnes & Jim Hecht | March 20, 2022 | 0.250 |
| 4 | 4 | "Who the F**k Is Jack McKinney?" | Damian Marcano | Max Borenstein & Rodney Barnes & Jim Hecht | March 27, 2022 | 0.314 |
| 5 | 5 | "Pieces of a Man" | Tanya Hamilton | Rodney Barnes & Max Borenstein | April 3, 2022 | 0.330 |
| 6 | 6 | "Memento Mori" | Tanya Hamilton | Max Borenstein & Rodney Barnes & Rebecca Bertuch | April 10, 2022 | 0.372 |
| 7 | 7 | "Invisible Man" | Payman Benz | Rodney Barnes & Max Borenstein | April 17, 2022 | 0.460 |
| 8 | 8 | "California Dreaming" | Payman Benz | Rodney Barnes & Max Borenstein | April 24, 2022 | 0.410 |
| 9 | 9 | "Acceptable Loss" | Salli Richardson-Whitfield | Rodney Barnes & Max Borenstein | May 1, 2022 | 0.503 |
| 10 | 10 | "Promised Land" | Salli Richardson-Whitfield | Rodney Barnes & Max Borenstein | May 8, 2022 | 0.535 |

=== Season 2 (2023) ===
| No. overall | No. in season | Title | Directed by | Written by | Original release date | U.S. viewers (millions) |
|---|---|---|---|---|---|---|
| 11 | 1 | "One Ring Don't Make a Dynasty" | Salli Richardson-Whitfield | Max Borenstein & Rodney Barnes | August 6, 2023 | 0.175 |
| 12 | 2 | "The Magic Is Back" | Trey Edward Shults | Max Borenstein & Rodney Barnes | August 13, 2023 | 0.198 |
| 13 | 3 | "The Second Coming" | Todd Banhazl | Max Borenstein & Rodney Barnes & Rebecca Bertuch | August 20, 2023 | 0.225 |
| 14 | 4 | "The New World" | Tanya Hamilton | Max Borenstein & Rodney Barnes & Jim Hecht | August 27, 2023 | 0.281 |
| 15 | 5 | "The Hamburger Hamlet" | Tanya Hamilton | Max Borenstein & Rodney Barnes and Jim Hecht | September 3, 2023 | 0.204 |
| 16 | 6 | "BEAT L.A." | Salli Richardson-Whitfield | Max Borenstein & Rodney Barnes & Jim Hecht | September 10, 2023 | 0.274 |
| 17 | 7 | "What Is and What Should Never Be" | Salli Richardson-Whitfield | Max Borenstein & Rodney Barnes & Jim Hecht | September 17, 2023 | 0.315 |

== Production ==
=== Development ===
On April 20, 2014, screenwriter Jim Hecht flew across the country to the home of sportswriter Jeff Pearlman. He pitched an adaptation of Pearlman's best-seller Showtime: Magic, Kareem, Riley and the Los Angeles Lakers Dynasty that would be similar to the television show Friday Night Lights. According to The Hollywood Reporter, Hecht brought Pearlman a bottle of nonalcoholic wine, a block of chocolate, and a tomato as an offering to convince Pearlman to sell him the rights to the book. "I had no money, so if he'd been like, '$30,000,' I would've been screwed," Hecht recalled. Pearlman, who had optioned several of his books where "nothing ever happened", agreed to let Hecht shop his book around town for a year. In 2015, producer Kevin Messick convinced Adam McKay to direct the pilot and produce.

In April 2019, HBO ordered a pilot of the series, which was written by Max Borenstein with a story by Borenstein and Hecht. The series was initially referred to by the working title Showtime, after Pearlman's book and the Lakers era that inspired it. By that summer, the series was described as being untitled, with HBO executive Casey Bloys later acknowledging that the title would have caused marketplace confusion given that one of HBO's direct premium television and streaming competitors is also named Showtime. In December, HBO officially greenlit a series order. On December 8, 2021, HBO announced that the series would be titled Winning Time: The Rise of the Lakers Dynasty; according to Bloys, "Winning Time" is a phrase that was already associated with Magic Johnson.

On April 7, 2022, HBO renewed the series for a second season. In July 2022, it was announced that Salli Richardson-Whitfield would, in addition to directing, join the second season as executive producer.

=== Casting ===
Francine Maisler is the show's casting director. In August 2019, Jason Clarke and Michael Shannon were cast to portray Jerry West and Jerry Buss respectively. However, the next month Shannon would exit due to creative differences, and Buss would be recast with John C. Reilly. Shannon reportedly did not like the fourth wall breaking format of the show and found it difficult to work with. Frequent McKay collaborator Will Ferrell had actively pursued the role of Buss since McKay had first started developing the series; however, McKay did not feel Ferrell was right for the role and instead cast Reilly without telling Ferrell. Upon learning of the decision via a phone call from Reilly, Ferrell was so infuriated that he ended his friendship and professional relationship with McKay. Quincy Isaiah and Solomon Hughes were additionally cast to play Magic Johnson and Kareem Abdul Jabbar after an extensive casting search. DeVaughn Nixon was added to the cast to portray his father, Norm Nixon.

By March 2021, additional castings including Adrien Brody, Sally Field, Michael Chiklis, Bo Burnham, Jason Segel, Sarah Ramos, Brett Cullen, and Lola Kirke were announced. In May 2021, Rory Cochrane, Danny Burstein, Austin Aaron, Ta'Nika Gibson, Edwin Hodge, Terence Davis, and Ja'Quan Cole joined the cast. In June 2021, Mike Epps, Max E. Williams, Carina Conti and Mariama Diallo joined the cast. In August 2021, Burnham exited the project due to scheduling conflicts while Sean Patrick Small, Rachel Hilson, Olli Haaskivi, Newton Mayenge, and Jon Young joined the cast, with Small replacing Burnham. Thomas Mann was confirmed, in June 2022, to have been promoted to a series regular for season two. In June 2023, it was announced that McCabe Slye was promoted as a series regular for the second season.

=== Filming ===
Principal photography for the first season began in Los Angeles on April 12, 2021, and concluded on October 31. It was confirmed that production on the second season started on August 24, 2022.

== Release ==
Alongside the title announcement in December 2021, HBO announced the series would debut in March 2022, with the premiere date subsequently set for Sunday, March 6 and aired an episode weekly, concluding the season on May 8, 2022.

=== Home media ===
The first season was released on October 4, 2022, on Blu-ray and DVD.

== Reception ==
=== Critical response ===
On review aggregator website Rotten Tomatoes, the first season holds an 85% approval rating based on 61 critic reviews, with an average rating of 7.6/10. The website's critics consensus reads, "Gleefully excessive in both form and function, Winning Time pairs a larger-than-life roster of characters with whiplash style to deliver an absolute slam dunk." On Metacritic, the first season has a score of 68 out of 100, based on 29 critic reviews, indicating "generally favorable reviews".

On Rotten Tomatoes, the second season holds an 83% approval rating based on 18 critic reviews, with an average rating of 7.4/10. The website's critics consensus reads, "Trying to defend the title is hard, but Winning Time's sophomore season keeps pace as some of the best courtside seats to sports history that television can provide." On Metacritic, the second season has a score of 68 out of 100, based on 13 critic reviews, indicating "generally favorable reviews".

=== Reactions from Lakers ===
Magic Johnson and Kareem Abdul-Jabbar criticized the series for historical inaccuracies. Johnson said he would not watch it because it didn't depict the Showtime era accurately, while Abdul-Jabbar referred to the series as deliberately dishonest. Jerry West demanded a retraction from HBO for the "cruel" and "deliberately false" depiction of him as a temperamental, foul-mouthed executive prone to angry outbursts and mood swings. HBO responded with the statement: "HBO has a long history of producing compelling content drawn from actual facts and events that are fictionalized in part for dramatic purposes. Winning Time is not a documentary and has not been presented as such. However, the series and its depictions are based on extensive factual research and reliable sourcing, and HBO stands resolutely behind our talented creators and cast who have brought a dramatization of this epic chapter in basketball history to the screen." West pursued legal action against HBO for defamation and stated that he would "take [it] all the way to the Supreme Court." Spencer Haywood, on the other hand, called his portrayal on the series a blessing.

=== Accolades ===
| Year | Award | Category | Nominee(s) | Result | Ref. |
|---|---|---|---|---|---|
| 2022 | Black Reel Awards for Television | Outstanding Drama Series | Winning Time: The Rise of the Lakers Dynasty | Nominated | |
| 2022 | Black Reel Awards for Television | Outstanding Supporting Actor, Drama Series | Wood Harris | Won | |
| 2022 | Black Reel Awards for Television | Outstanding Directing, Drama Series | Tanya Hamilton (for "Pieces of a Man") | Nominated | |
| 2022 | Black Reel Awards for Television | Outstanding Writing, Drama Series | Rodney Barnes and Max Borenstein (for "Acceptable Loss") | Nominated | |
| 2022 | Black Reel Awards for Television | Outstanding Musical Score | Nicholas Britell and Robert Glasper | Nominated | |
| 2022 | California on Location Awards | Location Manager of the Year – Episodic Television – One Hour | Gregory Alpert | Nominated | |
| 2022 | California on Location Awards | Location Team of the Year – Episodic Television – One Hour | Gregory Alpert, J.P. O'Connor, Matt Bolin, Tom Potier, Sam Gomez, Harry Middleton, Shelly Armstrong, Miles Beal-Ampah, Andre Balderamos, Anthony Balderamos, Helena Cho, Monica Cohen, Julian Stephens, Whitney Breite, and Willis Turner | Nominated | |
| 2022 | California on Location Awards | Assistant Location Manager of the Year – Television | Matt Bolin | Nominated | |
| 2022 | Hollywood Critics Association TV Awards | Best Cable Network Series, Drama | Winning Time: The Rise of the Lakers Dynasty | Nominated | |
| 2022 | Primetime Creative Arts Emmy Awards | Outstanding Cinematography for a Single-Camera Series (One Hour) | Todd Banhazl (for "Pieces of a Man") | Nominated | |
| 2022 | Set Decorators Society of America Awards | Best Achievement in Décor/Design of a One Hour Period Series | Jon Bush Richard Toyon, and Clayton Hartley | Nominated | |
| 2023 | Satellite Awards | Best Actor in a Television Series – Drama or Genre | John C. Reilly | Nominated | |
| 2023 | Satellite Awards | Best Supporting Actress – Series, Miniseries, Limited Series or Television Film | Sally Field | Nominated | |
| 2023 | Satellite Awards | Best Ensemble – Television | Winning Time: The Rise of the Lakers Dynasty | Won | |
| 2024 | Critics' Choice Awards | Best Drama Series | Winning Time: The Rise of the Lakers Dynasty | Nominated | |
| 2024 | Primetime Creative Arts Emmy Awards | Outstanding Guest Actor in a Drama Series | Tracy Letts (for "The New World") | Nominated | |
| 2024 | Primetime Creative Arts Emmy Awards | Outstanding Cinematography for a Series (One Hour) | Todd Banhazl (for "BEAT L.A.") | Nominated | |
| 2024 | Primetime Creative Arts Emmy Awards | Outstanding Period Costumes for a Series | Emma Potter, Maressa Richtmyer, and Shannon Moore (for "What Is and What Should Never Be") | Nominated | |
| 2024 | Primetime Creative Arts Emmy Awards | Outstanding Special Visual Effects in a Single Episode | Raymond McIntyre Jr., Victor DiMichina, Damien Stantina, and Javier Menéndez Platas (for "BEAT L.A.") | Nominated | |
| 2024 | Primetime Emmy Awards | Outstanding Directing for a Drama Series | Salli Richardson-Whitfield (for "BEAT L.A.") | Nominated | |
| 2024 | Visual Effects Society Awards | Outstanding Supporting Visual Effects in a Photoreal Episode | Raymond McIntyre Jr., Victor DiMichina, Javier Menéndez Platas, Damien Stantina (for BEAT LA) | Won | |
