= Mark Anthony Green =

American filmmaker and journalist

Mark Anthony Green, from Kansas City, Missouri, is an American filmmaker, a former journalist, and an editor of GQ Magazine. He made his feature directorial debut with the film Opus (2025).
