= Guns Up (film) =

2025 American film

- German theatrical release poster
- Directed by: Edward Drake
- Written by: Edward Drake
- Produced by: Edward Drake; Jeffrey Greenstein; Jon Keeyes; Mandi Murro; J. J. Nugent; Tobias Weymar
- Starring: Kevin James; Christina Ricci; Maximilian Osinski; Luis Guzmán; Melissa Leo
- Cinematography: Brendan Galvin
- Edited by: Todd E. Miller
- Music by: Aoife O'Leary; Gerry Owens
- Production companies: Millennium Media; Rearview Pictures
- Distributed by: Vertical
- Release dates: May 30, 2025 (South Africa); July 18, 2025 (United States)
- Running time: 91 minutes
- Country: United States
- Language: English
- Box office: $252,865

Guns Up is a 2025 American action comedy film directed by Edward Drake and starring Kevin James and Christina Ricci alongside Maximilian Osinski, Luis Guzmán, and Melissa Leo. The film follows Ray Hayes (James), a former cop turned mob henchman who must keep his family safe after his final job goes wrong.

Guns Up was released in the United States by Vertical on July 18, 2025, and received mixed to positive reviews from critics.

== Plot ==
Ray Hayes is an ex-cop who now works as a mob henchman while trying to maintain a normal home life with his wife Alice and their children. Although he dreams of leaving “The Family” behind and opening a diner with Alice, Ray is still tied to the criminal organization he serves.

As he prepares to walk away for good, Ray is given one final job. The assignment goes off the rails, putting him in direct conflict with the mob. Branded a liability, Ray becomes a target. With the clock ticking, he has only one night to get his unsuspecting family out of the city before the mob kills him.

The film follows Ray as he fights off waves of attackers sent to eliminate him, blending high‑octane action with broad comedy. Throughout the night, Ray struggles to protect his family without revealing the truth about his double life, forcing him to confront the consequences of the choices that led him there.

== Cast ==
- Kevin James as Ray Hayes
- Christina Ricci as Alice Hayes
- Maximilian Osinski as Antonio Castigan
- Luis Guzmán as Ignatius Locke
- Melissa Leo as Michael Temple
- Leo Easton Kelly as Henry Hayes
- Keana Marie as Siohbán Hayes
- Timothy V. Murphy as Lonny Castigan
- Joey Diaz as Charlie Brooks
- Francis Cronin as Danny Clogan
- Solomon Hughes as Ford Holden
- Miroslav Barnyashev as Harry the Hammer

== Production ==
In May 2023, Kevin James was cast in the film in the lead role. Guns Up was filmed in New Jersey from June to July 2023. The film was produced by Millennium Media. James performed his own stunts during filming.

During the 2023 Writers Guild of America strike, director and writer Edward Drake made changes to the film's script, which he claimed were related to his role as director, not as writer. Drake argued that the Directors Guild of America rules required him to make the script changes, though the WGA countered that Drake is not a DGA member. Drake was ultimately expelled from the Writers Guild after a disciplinary hearing in May 2024.

== Release ==
In February 2025, Vertical acquired the United States, United Kingdom, and Ireland theatrical distribution rights to Guns Up from Millennium. The film was released theatrically in the United States on July 18, 2025.

== Reception ==
=== Box office ===
Guns Up was first released theatrically in South Africa on May 30, 2025, where it grossed $13,165. In Mexico, the film grossed $58,046 in its opening weekend, finishing sixth at the box office during the weekend of July 6–8.

=== Critical response ===
On the review aggregator website Rotten Tomatoes, 61% of 23 critics' reviews are positive. The website's consensus reads: "While Kevin James' earnestness and fleeting moments of heart prevent it from feeling completely hollow, Guns Up struggles to balance its mix of high-octane shootouts and broad humor."

Travis Hopson of Punch Drunk Critics gave the film a positive review, praising the lead performances of James and Ricci and called it "the rare action-comedy that took me by surprise." In contrast, Peter Sobczynski of RogerEbert.com gave the film a highly negative review, calling it "one of those films that is so baffling that even as you are watching it, you can hardly believe that it exists" and "a total zero."
