= Tamera Tomakili =

American actress

- Born: Los Angeles, California
- Occupation: Actress
- Years active: 2019–present

Tamera Tomakili is an American actress. She is best known for playing Cookie Keely in Winning Time: The Rise of the Lakers Dynasty and Ivy Campbell in the crime drama Happy Face.

== Early life ==
Tomakili was born in Los Angeles, California. She graduated from Columbia University's MFA acting program in 2018.

== Career ==
Tomakili's first recurring role was in the comedy drama series Blindspotting Her first major role was in the sports drama series Winning Time: The Rise of the Lakers Dynasty where she played Cookie Keely. She was then cast as Ivy Campbell in the crime drama series Happy Face.She has also done various theater shows.

== Filmography ==
=== Film ===
Year	Title	Role	Notes
2013	Fruitvale Station	Girl	
2014	Moonshine	Molly	
2015	Heart Song	Melissa	Short
2016	Safe Place	The Woman	Short
2018	Horoscope of Love	Jessa	Short
2025	Opus	Rachel Malick	

=== Television ===
Year	Title	Role	Notes
2021	Run the World	Monife Adeyemo	Episode: "I Love Harlem"
2023	Blindspotting	June	3 episodes
2022-2023	Winning Time: The Rise of the Lakers Dynasty	Cookie Keely	17 episodes
2025	Happy Face	Ivy Campbell	8 episodes
