= Stephanie Suganami =

American actress

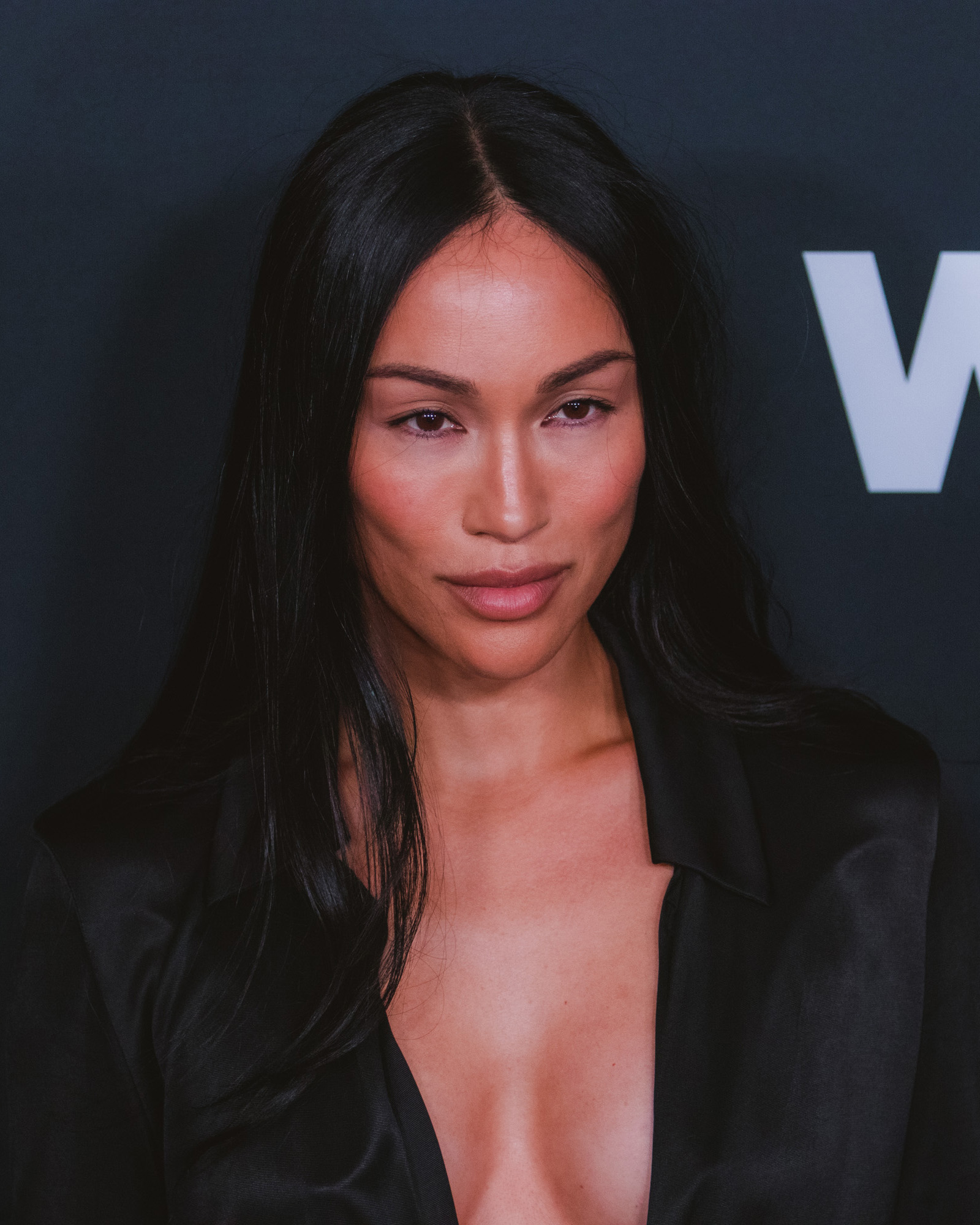
- Suganami in 2026
- Other name: Steph Shep
- Occupation: Actress
- Years active: 2020–present

Stephanie Suganami, also known as Steph Shep, is an American actor, entrepreneur, and environmental advocate. As an actress, she is best known for playing Emily Katz in the A24 thriller film Opus.

== Early life ==
Suganami grew up in Ontario, Ohio. She values the small-town culture of her hometown, appreciating its natural surroundings and communal way of life. She is of Japanese descent through her father.

== Career ==
Prior to her acting career she was famous for being Kim Kardashian's assistant. The two became good friends and Kim attended her wedding along with her sister's Khloe and Kourtney. She made her acting debut in an episode of the sitcom Dave. She made an appearance in the medical drama Doctor Odyssey. Her first recurring role was as Perla Tanaka in the drama series Power Book II: Ghost. Her most famous role so far has been as Emily Katz in the thriller film Opus.

== Personal life ==
Suganami is also a big environmental advocate, co-founding the international online platform Future Earth. She cites Al Gore as a big influence; and sits on the board of directors for The Climate Reality Project. She is married to producer Larry Jackson.

== Filmography ==
=== Film ===
Year	Title	Role	Notes
2022	Something from Tiffany's	Tiffany Saleswoman	
2025	Opus	Emily Katz	
TBA	White Lies	TBA	Post-production

=== Television ===
Year	Title	Role	Notes
2020	Dave	Stephanie	Episode: "Pibe"
2024	Doctor Odyssey	Kelly	Episode: "Singles Week"
2024	Power Book II: Ghost	Perla Tanaka	3 episodes
