= Happy Face (TV series) =

2025 American crime drama television series

- Promotional poster
- Genre: Crime drama
- Created by: Jennifer Cacicio
- Based on: Happy Face by Melissa Moore; Shattered Silence by Moore and M. Bridget Cook
- Showrunner: Jennifer Cacicio
- Starring: Annaleigh Ashford; James Wolk; Tamera Tomakili; Khiyla Aynne; Benjamin Mackey; Dennis Quaid
- Composer: Ariel Marx
- Country of origin: United States
- Original language: English
- No. of seasons: 1
- No. of episodes: 8

Production
- Executive producers: Melissa G. Moore; Conal Byrne; Will Pearson; Michael Showalter; Jordana Mollick; Liz Glotzer; Michelle King; Robert King; Jennifer Cacicio
- Cinematography: Brendan Steacy
- Running time: 47–57 minutes
- Production companies: CBS Studios; King Size Productions; Semi-Formal Productions; iHeartRadio

Original release
- Network: Paramount+
- Release: March 20 – May 1, 2025

Happy Face is an American crime drama television series. It was adapted from the 2018 podcast Happy Face by Melissa Moore, and her 2009 autobiography Shattered Silence, co-written with M. Bridget Cook. The series stars Annaleigh Ashford, James Wolk, Tamera Tomakili, Khiyla Aynne, Benjamin Mackey, and Dennis Quaid.

The series premiered on Paramount+ on March 20, 2025. In July 2025, the series was canceled after one season.

== Cast and characters ==
=== Main ===
- Annaleigh Ashford as Melissa Reed, Keith's daughter and makeup artist on The Dr. Greg Show
- James Wolk as Ben Reed, Melissa's husband
- Tamera Tomakili as Ivy Campbell, a producer on the show and Melissa's friend
- Khiyla Aynne as Hazel Reed, Melissa and Ben's 15-year-old daughter
- Benjamin Mackey as Max Reed, Melissa and Ben's 9-year-old son
- Dennis Quaid as Keith Hunter Jesperson, the Happy Face killer

=== Recurring ===
- Kathleen Duborg as June Jesperson, Melissa's mother and Keith's ex-wife
- Jennifer Spence as Renee
- Charles Zuckermann as Bassett, a correctional officer
- David Harewood as Dr. Greg, host of the daytime health and talk show, The Dr. Greg Show
- Patrick Gilmore as Cody O'Neill
- Michael O'Neill as Craig Calloway, a district attorney
- Connor Paton as Tyler
- Marci T. House as Joyce
- Teach Grant as Ashton McBride, the son of Keith's final victim Louise Nelson
- River Codack as Josh
- Zara Nikou Sichani as Victoria
- Ava Telek as Summer

=== Guest ===
- Zabryna Guevara as Gabriela
- Eric Keenleyside as Carl O'Neill
- Momona Tamada as Eva, Hazel's best friend and a true crime fanatic
- Damon Gupton as Elijah, a convict on death row in Texas for a 1995 murder
- Philip Ettinger as Shane Jesperson, a firefighter, Keith's son, and Melissa's older brother
- Chanelle Harquail-Ivsak as Adele
- Ted Cole as Eddie
- Jenn Lyon as Gillian, Keith's pen pal/girlfriend
- Paul McGillion as William
- Kyle Rideout as Brendan
- Philip Granger as Chave
- Sandy Sidhu as Dr. Wendy Chin
- Patricia Drake as Alice
- Jonathan Whitesell as Nico

== Episodes ==
No.	Title	Directed by	Written by	Original release date
1	"The Confession"	Michael Showalter	Jennifer Cacicio	March 20, 2025
Melissa Reed is the daughter of incarcerated serial killer Keith Jesperson, the "Happy Face killer", a connection that Melissa has hidden from her children and coworkers. One day Keith calls Melissa's boss, Dr. Greg, the host of a true crime television show, claiming that he wants to confess to an additional murder, but will only reveal information to Melissa in person. Melissa and the show's producer, Ivy Campbell, visit Keith in prison but he refuses to share any details beyond that he gifted a trampoline to Melissa after the murder. Melissa brings Ivy to her childhood home to visit her mother, June, who claims that Keith has sent people to harass her over the years. Ivy finds the trampoline, which was purchased in Texas. They question Keith again, and he describes the full murder sans the victim's name. Using details of Keith's story, Melissa and Ivy identify the victim as Heather Richmond, but learn that Heather's boyfriend Elijah has been convicted for the murder and is on death row. Melissa's daughter Hazel overhears her father Ben on the phone and learns that her grandfather is the Happy Face killer.
2	"Killing Shame"	Jennifer Getzinger	Andrew Gettens & Lauren Mackenzie	March 20, 2025
Melissa and Ivy travel to Texas and meet Elijah's lawyer, Gabriela, who hopes to reopen Elijah's case. Melissa is reluctant to testify in court as a witness, recalling the bullying she suffered when her father was arrested, but she changes her mind when District Attorney Callaway is dismissive of their arguments. Melissa asks Ben and Hazel if they will support her if she goes public. Hazel is supportive, as she has already told a friend about her connection to Keith, and true crime is popular at her school. Ben fears the consequences but is supportive when Melissa appears on Dr. Greg's show to talk about her father. Dr. Greg's questioning brings Melissa to tears when she admit her fears that she's like her father.
3	"Was it Worth It?"	Steven Piet	Adam Toltzis & Sal Calleros	March 27, 2025
Melissa is uncomfortable when Dr. Greg encourages her to use her newfound celebrity for financial gain. Ashton McBride, son of Keith's final victim, is upset by Melissa's representation of his mother in her television appearance, and harasses her at her house. Hazel breaks into Melissa's safe to get one of Keith's drawings, which she sells online. Ivy and Melissa learn that Elijah wrote a song that seems to be a confession, but Elijah claims that Heather wrote it. Melissa and Ivy speak to Heather's mother, Denise, and her best friend Jackie, to learn more about Heather. Callaway tells Melissa and Ivy that Keith had previously confessed to a murder he didn't commit after being paid to do so, so reopening Elijah's case requires hard evidence. Keith's contraband cellphone is confiscated when Melissa reports it to the warden, but Keith is able to arrange to get a new one. Melissa is shaken when an op-ed critical about her reveals that she had an abortion at 15. Ivy and Melissa find a church where the pastor remembers that Keith visited around the time of Heather's murder, and that Keith had his son, Shane, with him.
4	"Controlled Burn"	Laurel Parmet	Sarah Beckett	April 3, 2025
Melissa, Ivy and their cameraman Tyler travel to Shane's house where they meet Gillian, Keith's new girlfriend. Gillian is excited to be interviewed for Dr. Greg's show, but Shane forbids filming in his house. Shane at first refuses to answer Melissa's questions relating to Heather's murder, and is upset at Melissa's going public. The siblings reconcile when they confess that they're both guilt-ridden for not stopping Keith: Melissa saw blood in Keith's house, and Shane saved Keith from a suicide attempt prior to Heather's murder. Melissa realizes Keith sold information of her abortion to the press, and she confronts him, telling him that she was raped, just like his victims. Melissa attempts to say goodbye to Keith for good, but stops when he tells her where to find the murder weapon he used on Heather. Ben is stressed when his and Melissa's son, Max, faces ostracization due to their connection to Keith. Keith makes contact with Hazel.
5	"Don't Dream"	Ramaa Mosley	Erica Saleh & Inda Craig-Galván	April 10, 2025
Keith's wrench, the supposed murder weapon, is sent for testing but attempts to match DNA are confounded when Elijah's team learn that all evidence relating to Elijah's case has been destroyed. Calloway offers Elijah a deal: if he pleads guilty, the death penalty will be dropped and his sentence reduced to life with parole, but Elijah rejects it. Melissa talks to Denise in the hopes of getting familial DNA, but Denise refuses to help until Melissa arranges for Denise to talk to Joyce, Elijah's sister. The DNA on Keith's wrench is a match to Heather, but Calloway announces that the state now believes that Elijah and Keith worked together. Keith tells Melissa that he arranged for her rapist ex-boyfriend to be beaten up. Hazel buys a burner phone that she uses to call Keith, and the pair connect. Ben is comforted by Renee, their neighbor, while Melissa is away.
6	"Lorelai"	Darren Grant	Story by : Andrew Gettens & Lauren Mackenzie; Teleplay by : Bam Johnson	April 17, 2025
Calloway threatens Keith to get him to implicate Elijah, but Keith refuses. Melisa and Ivy find video footage that Heather was still alive at the time Elijah supposedly murdered her. Joyce confesses to Melissa and Ivy that Keith contacted her three months earlier claiming that he murdered Heather and asking for the case files. Melissa is dismayed that Keith may have been lying all along, but Ivy insists that they keep going for Elijah's sake. Elijah gets a new hearing, where Calloway doesn't rebut the new evidence, and the judge allows Elijah to go free. Hazel, her crush Josh, and a few other schoolmates travel to an abandoned motel to search for Keith's things, but they are unable to find anything and the others leave Hazel behind. Hazel calls Keith for help, and he arranges for his friend, Ennis, to send her home. Ben faces trouble at work, and discovers that Hazel has been calling Keith.
7	"My Jesperson Girls"	Samira Radsi	Tiffany Ezuma & Brandi Nicole Payne	April 24, 2025
Melissa and Ben tell Keith to stop communicating with Hazel, but he is dismissive. Melissa explains to Hazel that Keith is manipulating her, but Hazel has difficulty believing her. June counters that Melissa is also in denial about her attachment to Keith, and reveals that a favorite childhood memory Melissa has of Keith is actually the aftermath of Keith's attempt to kill her and June. Melissa meets Ashton to apologize, and the pair connect over their attempts to run away from their Keith-related trauma. Melissa, following a lead given by Keith, discovers that someone stole Heather's bloodied dress from evidence, which could have been used to stage Keith's wrench as the murder weapon. Melissa shares this information with Ivy, along with her belief that Keith falsely confessed in order to spend time with her. Ben encounters a prison guard who offers to arrange for Keith to die in prison for a price, which Ben accepts after he has an explosive argument with Melissa and discovers Hazel's loving drawings of Keith.
8	"The Star"	Darren Grant	Jennifer Cacicio	May 1, 2025
Melissa, Ivy and Tyler review the footage of Heather and suspect that she was with Cody, a school friend, just before she died. Melissa follows a lead to Cody's family bar, where she finds the remains of Heather's guitar and is cornered by Carl, Cody's father, who confesses that he killed Heather, his anger triggered by Heather's song that was a confession of their adulterous relationship. Melissa's phone records Carl's confession and suicide, closing the case. Ben is remorseful and tries to cancel the deal to kill Keith; although Ben's message is not received in time, Keith collapses from a heart attack before he can be assaulted. Melissa visits Keith in the hospital and confronts him over his fake confession, which Keith claims he did in order to make Melissa a star. Melissa declares that their relationship is over for good. Hazel and Melissa reconcile. Melissa appears on Dr. Greg's show announcing that she'll be headlining a new segment on the show about true crime. Ben receives a call from Keith, who says that he knows that Ben tried to have him killed.

== Production ==
In September 2020, it was reported that Jennifer Cacicio, Robert and Michelle King were developing for CBS All Access a series based on Melissa Moore's true-crime podcast Happy Face, and her autobiography Shattered Silence, co-written with M. Bridget Cook. Moore is the daughter of Keith Hunter Jesperson, the Happy Face killer.

In October 2021, Paramount+ greenlit the series written by Jennifer Cacicio and produced by CBS Studios in association with King Size Productions, iHeartPodcasts and Semi-Formal Productions. Michael Showalter also served as an executive producer and directed the first episode.

In February 2024, Dennis Quaid signed on to play the Happy Face killer and Annaleigh Ashford to play his daughter Melissa Moore. The following month, James Wolk and Tamera Tomakili were cast to play Melissa's husband and Ivy, respectively. David Harewood signed on to play Dr. Greg, star of the fictional daytime health and talk show The Dr. Greg Show.

Principal photography took place in Vancouver between March 19 and June 19, 2024. Some scenes were shot in May at New Westminster City Hall, in place of Texas.

On July 21, 2025, the series was canceled after one season.

== Release ==
The first two episodes of Happy Face premiered on March 20, 2025, on Paramount+ with the remaining episodes of the eight-episode season released weekly.

== Reception ==
On the review aggregator website Rotten Tomatoes, 57% of 23 critics' reviews are positive, with an average rating of 6.5/10. The website's critics consensus reads, "Annaleigh Ashford and Dennis Quaid have a memorable dynamic in Happy Face, but tonal uncertainty keeps this true crime thriller from measuring up to the high bar set by creators Michelle and Robert King's previous work." Metacritic, which uses a weighted average, assigned the series a score of 55 out of 100, based on 13 reviews, indicating "mixed or average" reviews.
