= Amy Weber =

American actress

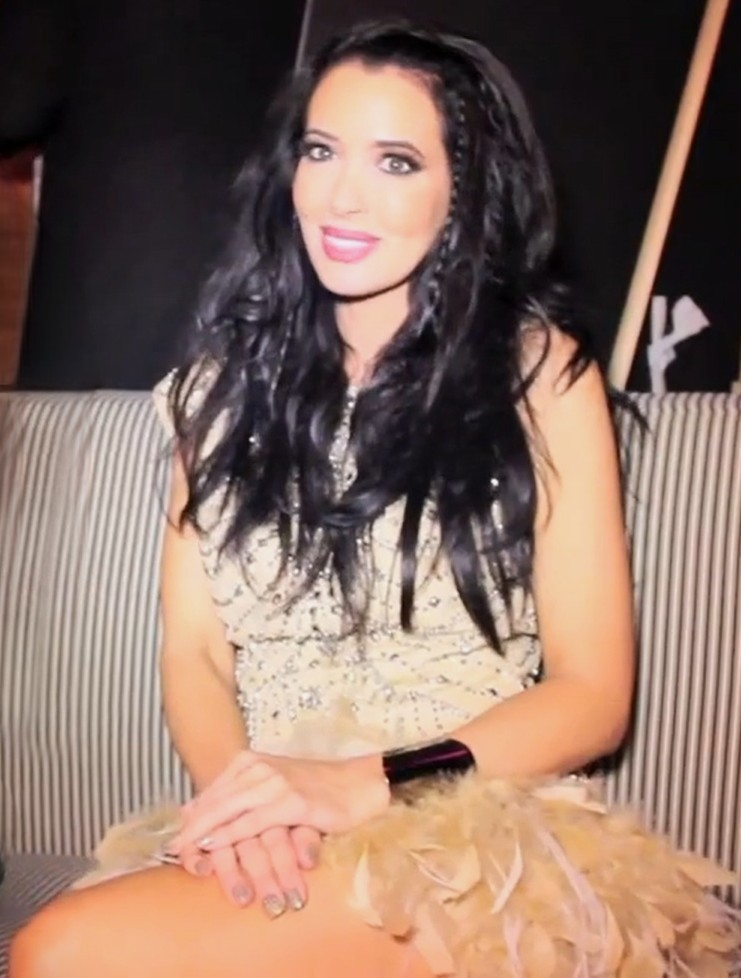
- Weber in 2013
- Born: Amy Marie Weber; July 2, 1970 (age 56); Peoria, Illinois, U.S.
- Occupations: Singer, professional wrestling manager
- Musical career
- Genre: Dance-pop
- Professional wrestling career
- Ring name: Amy Weber
- Billed height: 5 ft 6 in (1.68 m)
- Billed weight: 127 lb (58 kg)
- Billed from: Mapleton, Illinois
- Trained by: WWE
- Debut: November 18, 2004
- Retired: February 10, 2005
- Website: www.amyweber.com

Amy Marie Weber (born July 2, 1970) is an American actress, producer, singer, model, realtor and retired professional wrestling valet. She is best known for her lead role as Porcelain Bidet in the Howard Stern show, Son of the Beach and for her album, Let it Rain, the titular single for which stayed in the U.S. Billboard Chart and the UK Pop Chart for over a month. She was also a professional wrestling valet for World Wrestling Entertainment (WWE).

== Acting career ==
Weber's acting career began in 1992, with her first role being in an episode of Saved by the Bell. She played numerous roles in different television series including; Andy Richter Controls the Universe, City Guys, CSI: Las Vegas, Jenny, Melrose Place, Pacific Blue, Son of the Beach, The Young and the Restless, USA High and others. She played a lead role in the Howard Stern show, Son of the Beach. On December 31, 2004, she was featured in a sketch on the New Year's Eve live episode of The Tonight Show with Jay Leno, where Weber teamed up with Tom Green travelling all over New York City looking for someone to kiss him at midnight, which she got to do.

Weber has had lead roles in films; Art House, Becoming Pony Boi, Crackerjack 3, Dr. Life, Kolobos, Scarlet Mirror, Starforce, The Bet, The Contract, The Pumpkin Karver and Transmorphers. She also had small roles in; Joe Dirt, Pauly Shore Is Dead and Unbeatable Harold. She has also had starring roles in theatre productions of; 110 in the Shade, Apocalyptic Butterflies, Grease, Reservations for Two and Who's Afraid of Virginia Woolf?.

Weber also had a successful modelling career. In 1993, she posed on the cover of Playboy magazines, Bathing Beauties special edition. She also posed for Maxim magazine and was featured in their 2010 calendar. She appeared in various other magazines including; FHM, Health and Fitness, Muscle and Fitness, Open Your Eyes, Stuff and in WWE Magazine. She was the face of a Shiseido cosmetics campaign and featured in advertisements for Coors Light, Go Daddy, Sony and Wrigleys. She has also appeared as the lead in Toby Keith's music video for his single, Whiskey Girl. She owned her own modelling agency for 5 years based in Los Angeles, representing over 400 models. In 2022, she was interviewed and on the cover of Harper's Bazaar magazine.

== Professional wrestling career ==
=== World Wrestling Entertainment (2004–2005) ===
Weber first appeared for the WWE participating in the WWE 2004 Diva Search, where she ultimately placed fourth. Despite being eliminated, WWE would sign her to an official contract just a few weeks after her elimination. During the WWE Diva Search, she participated in the WWE Diva Dodgeball game at the WWE 2004 SummerSlam event a part of the winning team, Team Diva Search. She also participated in the controversial, infamous Diss The Diva challenge hosted by Stacy Keibler, during an episode of RAW Weber alongside remaining diva search contestants; Carmella DeCesare, Christy Hemme and Joy Giovanni competed in a live shoot promo challenge, the segment has gained notoriety for being one of WWE's most explicit segments in history. Weber called out contestant Carmella DeCesare calling her a "whore" and telling her that having a cock in her mouth, had nothing to do with wrestling, before calling her a bitch.

Despite being eliminated from The Diva Search, WWE hired Weber and she officially debuted on the Smackdown! brand in November 2004 as the image consultant of WWE Champion, John "Bradshaw" Layfield, cementing herself immediately in the main event storyline of Smackdown!. She began feuding with Joy Giovanni, they would get in to a catfight on the December 16 episode of Smackdown! after Giovanni gave Layfield a candy cane at ringside. On the January 6 episode of Smackdown! Kurt Angle was tricked in to walking in to Giovanni's locker room by Weber, to scare her while she showered which caused Giovanni to run backstage in a towel, in to Big Show's arms. This resulted in Show chasing Angle to the ring in defense of Giovanni and attack him. It was then revealed as a trick by The Cabinet to get Show and Angle angry with each other. On the January 13 episode of Smackdown! Giovanni and Weber would get in to another catfight, Smackdown! general manager Theodore Long would schedule a singles match between Giovanni and Weber, banning Show and Layfield from ringside, Giovanni did not show up to the ring for her match therefore losing by forfeit to Weber. It was then revealed Giovanni was kidnapped by Angle, after she was discovered bound and gagged in Layfield's limousine trunk to prevent the match from happening. On the January 27 episode of Smackdown! Giovanni threw a strawberry yoghurt in Weber's face after overhearing her badmouthing Giovanni to the other Smackdown! divas. The following week Giovanni hit Weber over the head with a fish bowl and attacked her, resulting in her being removed from the Smackdown! arena. After Weber's abrupt departure from WWE in February 2005 due to an alleged harassment incident during an overseas tour involving WWE superstars Edge and Randy Orton, their feud was suddenly dropped. Giovanni stated in a 2023 interview with Ring The Belle, that she and Weber were working towards a singles match at the 2005 No Way Out pay-per-view. To explain her departure from the company, Layfield stated she had been "fired" for accidentally firing a sleeping dart at him the previous week while he was playing with an inflatable dinosaur. The dart was actually intended for Layfield's No Way Out 2005 opponent, Big Show. She later stated in an interview that she "wasn't happy with the pay" and the "frat house-like" environment. In 2026, Layfield claimed he wished Weber had stayed around longer as her storyline with Giovanni helped his character.

In April 2020, Weber further explained that the allegations of being bullied by Edge and Randy Orton had led to her WWE exit in 2005;

"So when I got to Alaska, Shane McMahon was there, we were all getting our bags, and I was done," Weber said. "I just felt like I couldn't continue to be in an environment where people had no respect for me. They had their reasons, but I don't think taking two ibuprofen is a reason for someone to call you names, try to physically harm you, and then pour a drink in your face. So that's the story."

Giovanni and Weber released a DVD with Big Vision Entertainment in 2009 labelled Amy vs. Joy. The DVD focused on their WWE feud and featured bonus interviews and clips.

== Music career ==
In 2012, Weber released her first single titled; Let it Rain. The song charted on the U.S. Billboard Chart and the UK Pop Chart for over a month. In 2013, she released a second single which featured Sean Kingston titled; Dance of Life (Come Alive) which reached number 5 on the U.S. Billboard Chart. She released a third single featuring Lil Romeo titled; On and On that same year. She went on to release multiple other singles including; Hero, Shut it Down, Warrior and Welcome To My V.I.P. She released an album titled Let it Rain in 2014.

== Personal life ==
Weber briefly dated guitarist Robbie Crane, while on The Howard Stern Show, she claimed she had to sue him in small claims court over $4,000 he borrowed and did not pay back. She was later engaged to actor and model Dante Spencer in 2002. She ultimately married film producer David Dginger on May 17, 2008. The couple welcomed twins named Levi and Madison Grace on May 28, 2009. She has survived cervical cancer twice.

Weber is currently a realtor, at the Director of Residential Estates at the brokerage, Beverly & Co. She is still close friends with former WWE Diva, Joy Giovanni.

== Filmography ==
Film
Year	Title	Role	Notes
1995	Forbidden Games	Shauna	
1995	Dangerous Seductress	The Evil Queen	
1997	Traveller	N/A	Assistant producer
1998	Art House	Faith	
1999	Certain Guys	Photographer	
1999	Kolobos	Kyra	
2000	Starforce	Dahlia Rojik	
2000	Kiss Tomorrow Goodbye	Bartender	Television film
2000	Crackerjack 3	Kelly Jones	
2001	Joe Dirt	Lifeguard	Uncredited
2002	The Contract	Jessica Grey	
2003	Pauly Shore is Dead	Zoey's friend	
2005	Portrait of Eve	Eve Roth	
2006	Unbeatable Harold	Cocktail waitress	
2006	The Pumpkin Karver	Lynn Starks	Associate producer
2007	Diablita	Diablita	
2007	Transmorphers	Karina Nadir	
2008	Hanging in Hedo	Becky	
2008	The Haunting of Molly Hartley	N/A	Special thanks
2009	Becoming Pony Boi	Amy	
2012	Crossroad	Rita	Executive producer
2013	Playdate	Crying mom	
2013	The Soldier: The Search for Existence	N/A	Special thanks, short film
2014	Steps of Faith	Elizabeth Meyers	Executive producer
2023	R BnB	N/A	Associate producer, short film

Television as actress
Year	Title	Role	Notes
1992	Saved by the Bell	Chloe	1 episode ("Screech's Spaghetti Sauce")
1995-1996	Silk Stalkings	Shelly Hunter / Rebecca Wharton	2 episodes
1996	High Tide	Caitlin	1 episode
1996	Melrose Place	Housewife	1 episode ("True Fibs")
1997	L.A. Heat	Waitress / Julia the Nudist	2 episodes
1997	Jenny	Woman	1 episode ("A Girl's Gotta Lie")
1998	Mike Hammer, Private Eye	Sylvia	1 episode ("Big Brother's Secret")
1998	USA High	Maggie	1 episode ("Jackson's Choice")
1998	Pacific Blue	Nikki	1 episode ("Thrill Week")
1998	7th Heaven	Jenny	1 episode ("Here Comes Santa Claus")
1999	City Guys	Ariana	1 episode ("Greece is the Word")
1999	Port Charles	Lark Madison-Scanlon	11 episodes
2001	Sheena	Ruby	1 episode ("Divas of the Jungle")
2001	18 Wheels of Justice	Special Agent Abigail Rose	1 episode ("Second Sense")
2001	CSI: Crime Scene Investigation	Cocktail waitress	1 episode ("And Then There Were None")
2002	Son of the Beach	Porcelain Bidet	14 episodes
2002	Andy Richter Controls the Universe	Andy's girlfriend	1 episode ("Relationship Ripcord")
2004	SummerSlam (2004)	Amy Weber	Television special
2004	Armageddon (2004)	Amy Weber	Television special
2004-2005	WWE Smackdown!	Amy Weber	Recurring role
2005	Royal Rumble (2005)	Amy Weber	Television special
2011	The Young and the Restless	Cameo	1 episode, uncredited

Television as self
Year	Title	Role	Notes
1999	1st Annual TV Guide Awards	Self; cameo	Television special
2001	Hollywood Digital Diaries	Self; guest	1 episode
2001	Getaway	Self; co-host	10 episodes
2002	Undressed	Self; feature	1 episode
2002	The Howard Stern Show	Self; guest	1 episode
2003	6th Annual Academy of Interactive Arts & Science Awards	Self; cameo	Television special
2004	Lingerie Bowl	Self; co-host	Television special
2004	10 Things Every Guy Should Experience	Self; guest	1 episode
2004	WWE RAW Diva Search Casting Special	Self; contestant	Television special
2004	WWE $250,000 RAW Diva Search	Self; contestant	4th place, 9 episodes
2004	The Tonight Show with Jay Leno	Self; guest	1 episode
2005	Nu Wrestling Evolution	Self; guest	1 episode
2005	Love Lounge	Self; guest	1 episode
2005-2006	In the Mix	Self; co-host	32 episodes, associate producer
2008	Entertainment Tonight	Self; guest	1 episode
2009	Amy vs. Joy	Self; feature	Documentary
2012	Good Samaritans	Self; host	5 episodes, executive producer
2013	The Doctors	Self; guest	1 episode
2014	David Tutera's CELEBrations	Self; guest	1 episode
2018	Welcome Home	Self; realtor	3 episodes, executive producer
2021-2022	Amy Weber Unleashed	Self; host	32 episodes, executive producer, podcast
2023	LA Boss Mom	Self; cast member	5 episodes, executive producer, web series

Music videos
Year	Title	Artist	Role
2004	Whiskey Girl	Toby Keith	Female lead

Direct to video
Year	Title	Role
1998	Wheels, Heels and Hot Licks	Self; model
2005	WWE Viva Las Divas	Amy Weber

Video games
Year	Title	Role	Notes
2005	WWE Smackdown! vs. RAW 2006	Amy Weber	Scanned for game, removed due to WWE departure, unplayable

== Discography ==
=== Albums ===
Year	Album	Chart
2012	Let it Rain	—

=== Singles ===
Year	Song	U.S.	U.S. Dance	Album
2012	"Let It Rain"	—	45	TBD
2012	"Welcome to My V.I.P."	—	—	TBD
