= Maria Barros =

Maria Barros may refer to:

- Maria Barros (fashion designer) (born 1980), Spanish fashion designer
- Maria Lorena Barros (1948–1976), Filipino women's rights activist
- Maria Victoria Barros (born 1992), Brazilian politician and businesswoman
