= Denise Vasi =

American fashion model and actress (born 1983)

Denise Vasi Mandler
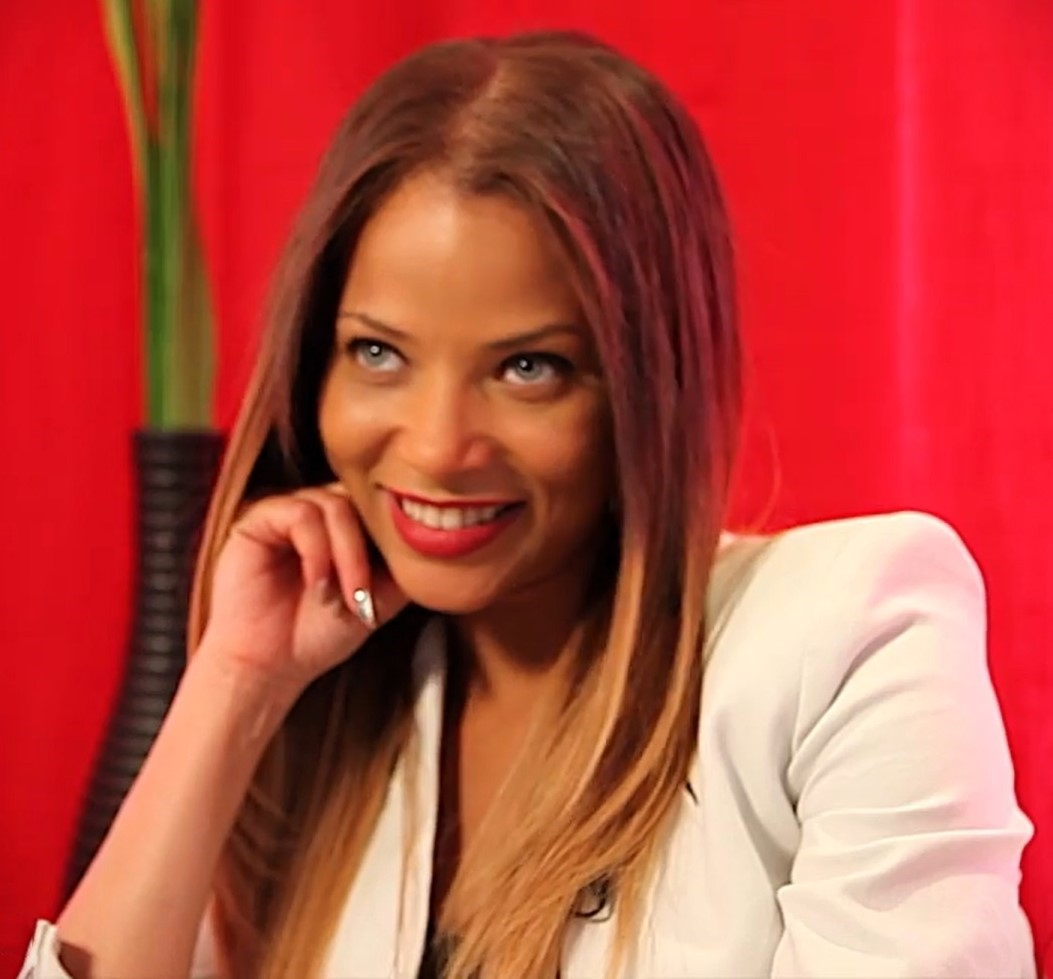
- Vasi in 2021
- Born: March 1, 1983 (age 43); New York City, U.S.
- Occupations: Actress, model
- Years active: 2006-present
- Spouse: Anthony Mandler (m. 2013)
- Children: 2

Denise Vasi (born March 1, 1983) is an American fashion model and actress. She is best known for her roles as Randi Hubbard on ABC's soap opera All My Children (2008–2011) and Raquel on Single Ladies (2011-2015).

== Early life ==
Denise Vasi was born on March 1, 1983, in New York City. Denise and her two younger brothers were raised in Brooklyn. She is of Puerto Rican, Dominican and Greek heritage. She attended John Dewey High School and Long Island University where she studied Business.

== Career ==
=== Acting ===
Vasi appeared in ABC's soap opera All My Children as Randi Morgan from 2008 to 2011. She had guest roles on several television shows such as Law and Order: Criminal Intent, White Collar, How to Make It in America and The Protector. Her film roles include The Good Guy (2009), When in Rome (2010), What's Your Number? (2011) and Magic Mike (2012). In 2012, she joined the second season of VH1's comedy-drama series Single Ladies in a new lead role. She portrayed businesswoman Raquel Lancaster for three seasons.

She also featured in rapper Common's music video for Go! and How Do I Breathe by singer Mario.

=== Modeling ===
Vasi signed to Ford Models at the age of 12. She is represented by Next Models and has featured in on-camera and print campaigns for brands including Olay, Dove, Bobbi Brown, Nexxus, Urban Decay, Avon, Sharp, Lay's, Target, Fiorucci, Maria Barros, Dollhouse, American Eagle, Old Navy, Republic and Frederick's of Hollywood.

She has appeared in magazine editorials for Marie Claire, Elle and GQ Italia.

== Personal life ==
On October 12, 2013, Vasi married director Anthony Mandler in Santa Ynez, California. In February 2015, Vasi gave birth to their daughter, Lennox, during an at home birth. On June 28, 2019, she gave birth to a baby boy, also during a home birth.

== Filmography ==
Film
Year	Title	Role	Notes
2009	The Good Guy	Suki	
2009	The Magnificent Cooly-T	Morgan	
2010	When in Rome	Gala Hostess	Uncredited
2011	What's Your Number?	Cara	
2012	Magic Mike	Ruby	
2013	Things Never Said	Jasmine	

Television
Year	Title	Role	Notes
2006	Exposing the Order of the Serpentine	Student	
2008	Law & Order: Criminal Intent	Sarah Baker	Episodes: "Assassin" and "Contract"
2008–2011	All My Children	Randi Hubbard	252 episodes
2009, 2011	White Collar	Cindy	Episodes: "Pilot" (2009) and "On Guard" (2011)
2010	How to Make It in America	Alisa	Episode: "Never Say Die"
2011	The Protector	Mary Jo Holder	Episode: "Bangs"
2012–2014	Single Ladies	Raquel Lancaster	26 episodes
