= The Pumpkin Karver =

- Poster art for The Pumpkin Karver
- Directed by: Robert Mann
- Written by: Robert Mann; Sheldon Silverstein
- Produced by: Sheldon Silverstein
- Starring: Amy Weber; Minka Kelly; Robert Mann; Terrence Evans; Tony Little; Charity Shea; Michael Zara; David Austin; Jared Show; David J. Wright (credited on screen as; David J. Wright)
- Cinematography: Philip Hurn
- Edited by: Philip Hurn
- Music by: David Kowal
- Production company: Mannatee Films
- Distributed by: First Look International
- Release date: October 31, 2006
- Running time: 90 minutes
- Countries: United States; Australia
- Language: English

The Pumpkin Karver is a 2006 American slasher film written by Robert Mann and Sheldon Silverstein, produced by Sheldon Silverstein and directed by Robert Mann, it stars Amy Weber, Minka Kelly, Terrence Evans and Charity Shea.

== Plot ==
Jonathan and his sister Lynn have moved to a new town to start a new life after Jonathan killed his sister's boyfriend Alec accidentally in a prank gone horribly wrong. They are heading to a Halloween party but there's a catch: the man Jonathan killed is back in a new, horrific form. Lynn and Jonathan meet some party goers, like Tammy, Spinner and a friend, Tammy's ex, Lance, the sexy-blonde Rachel, Lance's friend, Brian, best friends Yolanda & Vicki and the old carver, Ben Wicket, as well as other party goers. After a fight with Lance, Jonathan starts thinking that Alec is there at the party, but chooses to ignore this.

At night, Rachel has sex in her van with Lance's friend, A.J, but he leaves angrily after Rachel hits him over the face and head. Rachel goes looking for A.J, but when she doesn't find him, goes back to her van. However, she's attacked, by a supposed Alec, who carves her face in.

Later, Brian reveals to Tammy that Lance was "being a dick". Shortly after Tammy leaves, Brian is attacked by a killer, who makes him walk backward, making Brian impale himself.

Jonathan is stalked several times by Ben, but then escapes. Later, Yolanda and Vicki find Rachel and then flee, warning Spinner and a friend, but they are both too drunk and refuse to believe the two girls.

Later, Spinner leaves and his friend is struck with a scythe, before getting decapitated. Jonathan disappears, and Lynn and Tammy go and try to find him. Lynn meets Lance, who attempts to rape her, but she escapes before Lance is later stabbed to death.

Tammy is pursued by the killer, before getting trapped in a bear trap, and right away is stabbed to death. Lynn and Jonathan meet, where they later find Tammy's dead body. Alec and Jonathan meet, and they confront each other, until Jonathan stabs Alec to death, the same way he did in the prank earlier. Later, it is revealed that "Alec" is Lynn's dead boyfriend who has returned for revenge, and it was Jonathan's trauma the one that made him think it was Alec who he had thought had returned for vengeance.

The next morning, the police arrive. Shortly after questioning, Jonathan and Lynn are ready to leave, but Jonathan transforms into Alec, Lynn's dead boyfriend, revealing that he was the killer, and that Ben had been trying to kill him because of that.

The movie ends with Jonathan stabbing Lynn to her death.

== Cast ==
- Amy Weber as Lynn Starks
- Minka Kelly as Tammy
- Terrence Evans as Ben Wicket
- Tony Little as Officer Briggs
- Charity Shea as Rachel
- Michael Zara as Jonathan Starks
- Mistie Adams as Yolanda
- David Austin as Lance
- Lindsey Carpenter as Amber
- Rachelle Clune as Connie
- Jonathan Conrad as A.J.
- Amy Cowieson as Go-Go Dancer
- Briana Gerber as Vicki
- Kenny Gould as Detective Farrows
- Thomas Hurn as Joe
- Bryan Jamerson as MIB Kid #2
- Brian Kary as MIB Kid #1
- Amber Kendrella as Marilyn Monroe
- Robert Mann as D.J. Jon on Radio
- David Phillips as Bonedaddy
- Jared Show as Grazer
- Alex Weed as Spinner
- David J. Wright as Alec

== Release ==
The film was released direct-to-video on October 31, 2006, by First Look International.

== See also ==
- List of films set around Halloween
