= Charity Shea =

American actress (born 1983)

- Born: December 4, 1983 (age 42); Boulder, Colorado, United States
- Occupation: Actress
- Years active: 2002–2017

Charity Shea real name Charity Guthrie (born December 4, 1983) is an American former actress. She is best known for her role as troubled teenager Samantha Best in The Best Years. She has starred in films including Alpha Dog with Justin Timberlake and Bruce Willis. She appears as "April" on the VH1 drama series Single Ladies, starring alongside Stacey Dash and LisaRaye McCoy.

== Filmography ==
Film roles
Year	Title	Role	Notes
2005	Scarred	Alex	Direct-to-video film
2006	Alpha Dog	Sabrina Pope	
2006	The Pumpkin Karver	Rachel	
2007	Good Time Max	Big Guy's Girl	
2007	After Sex	Leslie	
2008	Toxic	Lucille	
2014	Pretty Perfect	Whitney	

Television roles
Year	Title	Role	Notes
2004	Entourage	Girl #2	Episode: "The Review"
2005	CSI: Miami	Amanda	Episode: "10-7"
2007–2009	The Best Years	Samantha Best	Main role
2011–2015	Single Ladies	April Goldberg-Jenkins	Main role
2011	Rules of Engagement	Gwen	Episode: "The Chair"
2017	The Psycho She Met Online	Miranda Breyers	Television film
