= Single Ladies (TV series) =

- Genre: Comedy drama
- Created by: Stacy A. Littlejohn
- Starring: Stacey Dash; LisaRaye McCoy; Charity Shea; Denise Vasi
- Music by: Matter Music
- Country of origin: United States
- Original language: English
- No. of seasons: 4
- No. of episodes: 43

Production
- Executive producers: Queen Latifah; Jill Holmes; Alexander Motlagh (seasons 1–3); Stacy A. Littlejohn (season 1); Shakim Compere; Shelby Stone; Felicia D. Henderson
- Running time: 42–46 minutes
- Production companies: In Cahoots Media (seasons 1–3); The Popfilms Movie Company (seasons 1–3); The Littlejohn Experience (season 1); Flavor Unit Entertainment; Blue Ice Pictures (season 4); Water Walk Productions (season 4)

Original release
- Network: VH1 (seasons 1–3); Centric (season 4)
- Release: May 30, 2011 – April 22, 2015

Single Ladies is an American comedy-drama television series that debuted on May 30, 2011, as a two-hour television film on VH1. Created by Stacy A. Littlejohn and produced by Queen Latifah's Flavor Unit Entertainment, the series chronicles the lives of three friends—Val, Keisha and April (and later Raquel)—and their relationships. VH1 announced on February 28, 2014, that Single Ladies was canceled. It was announced on April 8, 2014, that BET Networks ordered a fourth season which would air on Centric. Single Ladies returned on March 18, 2015, with Melissa De Sousa joining the cast.

== Cast ==
Actor/Actress	Character	Seasons			
Actor/Actress	Character	1	2	3	4
Kassandra Clementi	Christina Carter	Main			
Stacey Dash	Valerie "Val" Stokes	Main			
D. B. Woodside	Malcolm Franks	Main	Main	Main	
Charity Shea	April Goldberg	Main	Main	Main	Main
LisaRaye McCoy	Keisha Green	Main	Main	Main	Main
Travis Winfrey	Omar Kearse	Recurring	Main	Main	Main
Harold “House” Moore	Terrence Franks	Recurring	Recurring	Main	Main
Terrell Tilford	Sean Clark		Recurring	Main	
Denise Vasi	Raquel Lancaster		Main	Main	
LeToya Luckett	Felicia Price			Main	Main
Damien Dante Wayans	David Berenger			Recurring	Main
Chastity Dotson	Roshanda Rollins				Main
Melissa De Sousa	Austin Aguilera				Main

=== Main ===
- Stacey Dash as Valerie "Val" Stokes (season 1): An aspiring fashion mogul who purchased a fashion boutique in "one of the hottest areas of Atlanta," the VH1 website says, "Ultimately, she's a "good girl" looking for a good man." Val has relocated to Milan and sold her boutique over to Raquel.
- D. B. Woodside as Malcolm Franks (seasons 1–3): He turned his father's jewelry store into a successful international business. According to the VH1 blog, "He loves the ladies, and the ladies love him." In season 4, he has been missing without a trace.
- Charity Shea as April Goldberg-Jenkins: April has been married for seven years to Darryl, and hopes to pursue her career dream by moving from assistant to the record label's owner to an A&R executive. As she begins to spread her wings, she realizes that marriage may not be her ideal situation. April moved to London to pursue her career.
- LisaRaye McCoy as Keisha Green: a former hip-hop music video model turned semi-professional poker player who relies on her head instead of her heart when it comes to relationship decision-making. Keisha fled the country after being released from prison.
- Travis Winfrey as Omar Kearse (season 1, recurring; seasons 2–4): an employee at the boutique and the outspoken, openly gay friend to the women.
- Harold “House” Moore as Terrence Franks (seasons 1–2, recurring; season 3–4): Malcolm's troublesome brother.
- Terrell Tilford as Sean Clark (season 2, recurring; season 3): Keisha's ex-boyfriend and lawyer whom she begins dating on the rebound from Malcolm.
- Denise Vasi as Raquel Lancaster (seasons 2–3): a smart, savvy businesswoman. She has disappeared and is presumed to have been murdered in season 4.
- LeToya Luckett as Felicia Price (seasons 3–4): Savvy founder and Senior Partner of Price Management, one of the most influential music management companies in the world and April's new boss.
- Damien Dante Wayans as David Berenger (season 3, recurring; season 4) – April's one night stand who also works at Price Management.
- Chastity Dotson as Roshanda Rollins (season 4): Raquel's half-sister who arrives in Atlanta during Raquel's disappearance.
- Melissa De Sousa as Austin Aguilera (season 4): a socialite embarking on a business venture in Atlanta.

=== Recurring ===
- Timon Kyle Durrett as Quinn Davis (season 1) – Val's selfish basketball player boyfriend of five years.
- Tilky Jones as Casey (season 1) – Val's tattoo artist friend with benefits, hopes they can start a relationship.
- Anthony Azizi as Wes Domingus (season 1) – April's heartless boss at the record company.
- Tyler Hilton as Reed Durham (season 1) – A wild child singer that April takes under her wing when he struggles to get his album released.
- Queen Latifah as Sharon Love (season 1) – Val's college roommate and news presenter.
- Lauren London as Shelley (season 1) – Quinn's ex-fiancé and a friend to the girls, Jerry Waters' daughter.
- Rick Fox as Agent Winston (season 1) – an ambitious FBI agent investigating fraud and extortion who becomes involved with Keisha.
- Anthony Montgomery as Darryl Jenkins (seasons 1–2) – April's husband of seven years, an investment banker.
- Colin Salmon as Jerry Waters (seasons 1–2) – Owner of Quinn's basketball team, Shelley's father and Val's boyfriend.
- Flex Alexander as James Blackwell (season 2) – Shelley's boyfriend, running for governor of Atlanta.
- Tina Lifford as Evelyn Lancaster (season 2) – Raquel's snobbish mother.
- William Levy as Antonio (season 2) – Raquel's sex addicted childhood sweetheart.
- Paula Patton as Laila Twilight (season 2) – a singer feuding with Sharon Love.
- Ricky Whittle as Charles (season 2) – Raquel's boyfriend, a writer.
- Mark Tallman as Reggie Westfield (season 2) – April's problem prone boyfriend.
- Jamie Moreen as Nate Phillips (season 2) – a part-time boyfriend of Raquel's while she also dates Charles.
- Finesse Mitchell as Jobari Freeman (season 2) – a city bus driver that falls for Morgan until their different relationship plans clash.
- Cassandra Freeman as Morgan Thomas (seasons 2–4) – a crazy and wild new employee at the boutique, mother of one, also looking for love and a chance to expand her family.
- La La Anthony as Presley (seasons 2–4) – Omar's big sister.
- Lesley-Ann Brandt as Naomi Cox (season 3) – A woman that claims she and Malcolm's father were married and wants part ownership of Franks Jewels. She is represented by Sean Clark.
- Benzino as Dominic (season 3) – A poker player who has eyes for Keisha.
- Jason Giuliano as Nate Huntley (season 3) – Omar's potential love interest.
- Brian Ames as Ben Murphy (season 3)
- Alex Meraz as Sergio (season 3) – April's artist & ex-husband.
- Nicole Ari Parker as Dr. Evelyn Powell (season 4) – a pastor whose past may affect several lives.
- K. C. Collins as Derek (season 4) – Felicia's ex-husband.
- Michaela Thurlow as Tera Chey (season 4)
- Samantha Gracie as Breelyn Goldberg (season 4) – April's sister.
- Zoë Soul as Casey Bridges (season 4)
- Kathryn Winslow as Karen Bridges (season 4)
- Shailene Garnett as Bronwyn (season 4) – a newly hired temp working at Price Entertainment.

=== Guest stars ===
- Terrell Owens (season 1)
- Common as Mayor Trevor Howard (season 1) – the Mayor of Atlanta with a criminal history, has an affair with April and eight other women.
- Darrin DeWitt Henson as Blake (season 1); Detective Jordan (season 4)
- Wilson Cruz as Vincent (season 1)
- Kelly Rowland as DJ Denise Phillips (season 1) – a DJ that April persuades to play Reed's single, using her ties with April to sleep with Reed and get free clothes from the boutique.
- Pilar Sanders as Jennifer Howard (seasons 1–2) – Mayor Trevor Howard's wife.
- Rozonda 'Chilli' Thomas as herself — a personal friend of Keisha's.
- Kim Porter as Jasmine (season 1) – a conniving ex-video vixen that blackmails Keisha.
- Eve Jeffers as herself — an investor in the boutique.
- Jermaine Dupri as himself (season 1)
- Yelawolf as himself (season 1)
- Kandi Burruss (season 1)
- Cam'ron as himself (season 1) — an old friend of Keisha's.
- Mac Miller as himself (season 1) — an aspiring rapper that April manages to get signed.
- Michael Warren as Malcolm Franks Sr. (season 1) – Malcolm's father.
- Durrell "Tank" Babbs as Joe Mason (season 2) – a charming aspiring boxer that squat's in one of Keisha's properties.
- Damien Leake as Dennis Lancaster (season 2) – Raquel's unfaithful father.
- Omar Gooding as Marcus (seasons 2–4) – the homophobic boyfriend of Omar's sister.
- Margaret Avery as Josephine (season 2) – a woman that befriends April at the ball.
- Victoria Rowell as Veronica Vanderbilt (season 2) – Raquel's lawyer and Sean's ex-girlfriend.
- Justin Gaston as Gavin (season 2) – a man that April dates for a short while.
- T.I. as Luke (season 2) – a friend of Keisha's and her pretender.
- Alana de la Garza as Nicolette (season 2) – a former supermodel with her own clothing line and a combative reputation.
- Meek Mill as himself (season 3)
- Keke Palmer as herself (season 3)
- Wade Allain-Marcus as Wyatt (seasons 3–4)
- Future as himself (season 3)
- LaNeah "Starshell" Menzies as Gina Gamble (season 3) – an Assistant District Attorney who is being pursued by Sean to help build a criminal case against Malcolm Franks.
- Rico Ball as Grant (season 3) – a potential investor for Cut but is also interested in Raquel.
- Malik Yoba as Deacon Jarrett (season 3)
- Ja Rule as J.D. (season 3)
- Mateo as himself (season 3)
- Bobby Ray Simmons as himself (season 3–4)
- Karrueche Tran as Samantha Gray (season 4)
- Sharon Leal as Ellen Brown Barrington (season 4)

== Episodes ==
=== Series overview ===
Season	Episodes	Originally released	
Season	Episodes	First released	Last released
1	11	May 30, 2011	August 8, 2011
2	14	May 28, 2012	August 27, 2012
3	12	January 6, 2014	March 24, 2014
4	6	March 18, 2015	April 22, 2015

=== Season 1 (2011) ===
No. overall	No. in season	Title	Directed by	Written by	Original release date	US viewers (millions)
1	1	"Pilot"	Tamra Davis	Stacy A. Littlejohn	May 30, 2011	1.84
Val (Stacey Dash) is an ambitious, aspiring fashion mogul who wants to find a true partner. Keisha (LisaRaye McCoy), on the other hand, is a former video dancer just looking for a rich man to keep her in style. April (Charity Shea) has supposedly found the perfect man and the perfect marriage — but is learning that marriage isn't necessarily a happy ending. Val has a pregnancy scare when she sleeps with both K.C. and Quinn. April attempts to keep her affair a secret. Keisha is blackmailed by Jasmine, which lands her in hot water with Malcolm.
2	2	"Cry Me a River"	Tamra Davis	Stacy A. Littlejohn	June 6, 2011	1.88
To get over the recent break up with her ex lover, Val turns to online dating with hopes of meeting Mr. Right. Keisha decides to take her relationship with Malcolm up a notch, but with mixed emotions. Meanwhile, April finds her cover is blown when she is publicly outed for her affair.
3	3	"Indecent Proposal"	Tamra Davis	Teri Schaffer	June 13, 2011	1.85
Val is set up on a date with a seemingly perfect man (guest star Darrin Dewitt Henson) by April. Meanwhile, Keisha, along with Chilli, attends the Millionaire's of Atlanta event in hopes of meeting eligible rich bachelors. She meets Winston, a handsome bachelor who offers Keisha ten thousand dollars in exchange for sex. April's marriage crumbles in the wake of a scandal. A new intern is hired at the boutique.
4	4	"Confidence Games"	Rob Hardy	Lori Lakin Hutcherson	June 20, 2011	1.78
A party at "V" leaves Val with more dates than she can handle, but after a pep talk from Keisha, she quickly learns how to juggle. The Cold War continues between Keisha and Malcolm, but her new conquest, a distinguished professor, keeps her on her toes. Darryl serves April with divorce papers. And Val gives Christina advice on one of her school designs.
5	5	"That's What Friends Are For"	Rob Hardy	Stacy A. Littlejohn	June 27, 2011	1.83
Val is conflicted when Malcolm wants to hire her for a special event. Keisha, though still angry with Malcolm, gives Val her blessing to work with him. April's job is on the line when she takes on the record company's problem artist, Reed. K.C. gives Val some surprising news. And Christina is off to a rocky start at "V."
6	6	"Old Dogs, New Tricks"	Tamra Davis	Lori Lakin Hutcherson & Stacy A. Littlejohn	July 4, 2011	1.02
Val decides to take a break from men... and finds it to be a much harder task than anticipated. Plus, a vengeful shopping spree by Darryl forces April to become more pro-active.
7	7	"Take Me to Next Phase"	Tamra Davis	Stacy A. Littlejohn & Teri Schaffer	July 11, 2011	1.79
Rumors spread about Val's sexual preference just as her budding relationship. Keisha agrees to help Malcolm out a tough situation. Meanwhile, April takes a huge gamble when she invests her own money in Reed's career.
8	8	"Lost Without You"	Millicent Shelton	Demetrius Andre Bady & Stacy A. Littlejohn	July 18, 2011	1.99
Things couldn't be better for Val and Jerry... until Quinn shows up with a startling revelation. Keisha gets caught in the middle of an old feud between Malcolm and his brother. April tries to get Reed to focus more on his music than partying. And Christina gives Omar relationship advice.
9	9	"Can't Hide Love"	Millicent Shelton	Lori Lakin Hutcherson & Stacy A. Littlejohn	July 25, 2011	2.01
Another magical night with Jerry leaves Val wondering if he might be "the one." Keisha uncovers more of Malcolm's complicated past. April's efforts to get Reed's new track on the radio yield surprising results. Christina is baffled by her new boyfriend's hot-and-cold act.
10	10	"Everything Ain't What It Seems"	Tamra Davis	Lori Lakin Hutcherson & Stacy A. Littlejohn	August 1, 2011	1.88
Val finally discovers Jerry's one flaw and it might be a deal-breaker for her. Keisha worries that Malcolm isn't telling her everything about his relationship with his ex-wife. April's pride in Reed's success is short-lived when he starts ego-tripping. And Christina's exciting offer from the guy she's dating isn't what it's cracked up to be.
11	11	"Is This the End?"	Tamra Davis	Stacy A. Littlejohn	August 8, 2011	2.18
Val is more overwhelmed than ever after she receives two shocking surprises. Just when Keisha thought everything about Malcolm had been revealed, she gets dragged further into his murky past. One heartbreaking chapter of April's life closes, but another promising one opens. Christina's brutally honest live journal about Val is discovered... by Val.

=== Season 2 (2012) ===
No. overall	No. in season	Title	Directed by	Written by	Original release date	US viewers (millions)
12	1	"Slave to Love"	Tamra Davis	Stacy A. Littlejohn	May 28, 2012	1.76
Keisha's childhood friend, Raquel Lancaster (Denise Vasi), receives a shocking revelation from her fiancé after catching him in the act with another woman. The aftermath of Malcolm's disappearance lands Keisha in hot water with the FBI. And to make matters worse, she gets reacquainted with a former lover (special guest star Terrell Tilford). Meanwhile, April begins her new career as a club promoter, and is looking forward to dating now that her divorce is final. Also, the girls and Omar deal with saying good-bye to Val (who has moved to Milan and plans to sell the boutique).
13	2	"I Didn't Mean to Turn You On"	Tamra Davis	Stacy A. Littlejohn	June 4, 2012	1.82
Raquel plans on buying the boutique but must convince Eve first, while a lover (special guest star William Levy) from the past returns into her life. Meanwhile, April dates a doctor who is way too into a certain body part of hers, and Keisha deals with her love triangle between Malcolm and Sean. Omar and Derek adopt, but are at odds over their different parenting styles.
14	3	"No Ordinary Love"	Tamra Davis	Lori Lakin Hutcherson	June 11, 2012	1.93
Raquel plans new ways to help improve V. Antonio reveals something to Raquel that could damage their relationship, while April deals with being single and spending time alone. Meanwhile, Keisha decides to end her relationship with Malcolm. Also, Keisha deals with an unexpected development at one of her real estate listings.
15	4	"Ex-Factor"	Tamra Davis	Meg DeLoatch	June 18, 2012	1.80
The girls attend the lavish Kappa Boule Ball where Raquel meets an intriguing guy (special guest star Ricky Whittle), but also learns a family secret that shatters her foundation. Meanwhile, April begins dating a stripper, and Keisha learns that Malcolm is seeing another woman. Also, the girls run into their good friend Shelly and learns that she has a new promotion under her father's company.
16	5	"The Fabric of Our Lives"	Joaquin Sedillo	Demetrius Bady	June 25, 2012	2.38
Keisha loses big in a poker game to Luke (special guest star T.I.), a sexy gambler, but vows to win it all back no matter what it takes. Raquel dates a former professional football player whose beauty is only skin deep. April continues to date Jack the stripper, but struggles with the realities of his profession. Omar and his sister Presley's (guest star La La Anthony) boyfriend (guest star Omar Gooding) almost come to blows when Marcus says the wrong thing.
17	6	"Deuces"	Joaquin Sedillo	Fred Johnson	July 2, 2012	2.58
Raquel dates a 20-year-old store owner (guest star Romeo Miller) and has reservations about the age difference. Meanwhile, April books a wild R&B star (guest star Tony Rock) for the club. Keisha learns new details concerning Malcolm's new girlfriend.
18	7	"Eat, Play, Love"	Dennis Erdman	Kyera Keenne	July 9, 2012	2.49
Keisha moves on from Malcolm and begins a whirlwind relationship with a British military officer who has a shocking secret. Meanwhile, Raquel goes out with Charles, but falls for a sexy auto mechanic. April runs into her ex-husband Darryl (special guest star Anthony Montgomery) and is shocked to learn the identity of his new girlfriend (guest star Pilar Sanders). Meanwhile, Omar avoids going to his class reunion because he thinks he's a failure.
19	8	"Is This Love?"	Dennis Erdman	Fred Johnson	July 16, 2012	1.93
Hesitant at first, Keisha decides to take her platonic relationship with Sean to the next level. Raquel continues to date Charles but she learns the complications of dating two men at the same time when she unexpectedly runs into Nate. Meanwhile, April wants to explore her newfound feelings for her close friend, Reggie, but has a hard time doing so. Elsewhere, Raquel hires a single mom to work at the boutique and decides to give Omar a much deserved pay increase. Shelly's past catches up with her as her leaked sex tape has officially gone viral.
20	9	"The Business of Friendship"	Tamra Davis	Meg DeLoatch	July 23, 2012	2.66
Raquel and Charles' game playing creates a rough patch in their young relationship. Raquel and Keisha have business dealins with Nicolette (Alana de la Garza), a former supermodel with her own clothing line and a combative reputation. As Winston re-appears to wine and dine Keisha, Malcolm contacts her wanting to break their silence. April and Reggie find their transition from friends to lovers to be easier said than done. For the first time in his life, Omar deals with romantic rejection. Morgan's decision to be the initiator of a date has unforeseen consequences.
21	10	"Fast Love"	Tamra Davis	Story by : Stacy A. Littlejohn; Teleplay by : Lori Lakin Hutcherson & Meg DeLoatch	July 30, 2012	2.48
Malcolm re-enters Keisha's life with an offer to sell his father's mansion. During the property's auction, Keisha finds herself caught between battling divas, Sharon Love and Laila Twilight, whose competition escalates as they each try to be the highest bidder. Raquel worries Charles isn't interested in her because he keeps finding excuses to delay intimacy. April's relationship with Reggie hits a snag when she complains about his lovemaking skills. Omar's new man's addiction to social media threatens their budding relationship. Morgan learns the hard way to think before she speaks when her mouth gets her into trouble at work and at home.
22	11	"Stormy Weather"	Dianne Houston	Calvin Brown, Jr.	August 6, 2012	2.16
While a tornado threatens to touch down near the boutique, Raquel gets trapped in an elevator with Charles, who shares a surprising revelation. After an eye-opening encounter with Malcolm, Keisha finally commits to Sean, only to discover he's been committed elsewhere. April and Reggie's last-minute vacation plans are cancelled by the storm; as they wait it out, a new storm brews between them. Omar finds a unique way to cope with cabin fever. Morgan celebrates her three-week anniversary with Jobari but learns something about him that threatens their future.
23	12	"All or Nothing"	Dianne Houston	Kyera Keenne	August 13, 2012	2.29
After a night out with the girls, Keisha's doubts about Sean are a distant memory when he comes to her aid after she's victimized. Distraught over her recent break-up with Reggie, April manages to find closure in their relationship. Omar becomes smitten by a local designer, while Morgan reluctantly dates an older man. Meanwhile, Raquel re-examines her relationship with Charles when she and a sexy musician (guest star Justin Gaston) share a unique connection.
24	13	"Still In Love With You"	Tamra Davis	Lori Lakin Hutcherson	August 20, 2012	2.51
Keisha and Sean's relationship hits a snag when Malcolm asks for her help when he lands himself into a sticky situation. Raquel tries to put her break-up with Charles out of her mind but believes she may have another chance at love when Antonio reappears in her life. A desperate Reggie continues to pull out all the stops to convince April to move to New York City with him. Omar becomes the butt his latest boyfriend's jokes when he begins dating an up-and-coming comedian (guest star Tone Bell).
25	14	"Finally"	Tamra Davis	Stacy A. Littlejohn	August 27, 2012	2.88
Keisha comes face to face with a stalker and is subsequently forced to make a difficult choice between the men in her life. After meeting Charles' current flame and ex-girlfriend, Padma, Raquel realizes that she must confess her love or possibly lose him forever. When April meets Reggie's family, she learns something about him that rocks her world. Morgan is swept up in romance with a mysterious Middle-Eastern businessman who offers her an opportunity of a lifetime. Omar's new crush threatens his budding relationship with Parker in ways he could have never imagined.

=== Season 3 (2014) ===
No. overall	No. in season	Title	Directed by	Written by	Original release date	US viewers (millions)
26	1	"One Wedding and a Funeral"	Tamra Davis	Dayna Lynne North	January 6, 2014	2.59
Picking up three months later, the ladies are reunited for a lavish wedding of one of their closest friends. Keisha and Malcolm return from travelling around the world, only to be faced with a sudden tragedy. Raquel ditches her love woes and focuses on her boutique, Indulgence. Meanwhile, April seeks employment with Atlanta's most prominent music managers, Felicia Price, but their meeting is anything but cordial.
27	2	"Where There's a Will"	Tamra Davis	Nelson Soler	January 13, 2014	2.36
Raquel seeks new investment partners for Indulgence. April meets David Berenger at a party but their relationship becomes complicated when she learns that he works at Price Management. Keisha and Malcolm deal with Sean's return as he represents Naomi Cox, a woman who claims she deserves part ownership of Franks Jewels. Meanwhile, Omar makes a new friend on the football field.
28	3	"The Girl Most Likely To..."	Joaquin Sedillo	Yolanda E. Lawrence	January 20, 2014	2.29
Raquel mulls a partnership with Terrence in his new business venture. Meanwhile, April battles David over a new client, Keke Palmer, and Keisha considers disclosing a secret to Malcolm about a photo of Naomi and Malcolm Sr. she discovered. A run-in with Presley threatens Omar's new relationship.
29	4	"A Cut Above"	Joaquin Sedillo	Maisha Closson	January 27, 2014	2.04
Raquel and Terrence agree to venture in a new business partnership but they learn that they share different approaches to business. April sets out to score points with Felicia by introducing her to everyone at Indulgence, and meets a new guy in the process. Meanwhile, Keisha and Malcolm continue to deal with Sean.
30	5	"Show-Stopper"	Joaquin Sedillo	Tamiko K. Brooks	February 3, 2014	2.17
Raquel and Terrence struggle to work together as they search for the perfect jewelry piece to showcase at the upcoming Glam Walk fashion show. April and David continue their rivalry, even as David flirts with Raquel and April continues to date Ben. Keisha and Malcolm begin to settle back into life in Atlanta as they find a new house, but Naomi and Sean get ready to play their next card. A family emergency brings Presley and Marcus back into Omar's life.
31	6	"Walk the Walk"	Joaquin Sedillo	Dayna Lynne North	February 10, 2014	2.32
Raquel and Terrance continue to grow closer while working together. Meanwhile, April is feeling the pressure of Felicia's demands. Also, Malcolm is plagued with the investigation.
32	7	"Ask Me No Questions"	Tamra Davis	Maisha Closson & Yolanda E. Lawrence	February 17, 2014	1.84
Raquel meets Grant, a potential new investor, but Terrence believes that Grant is interested in more than just landing a new client. Meanwhile, David returns from L.A. and April learns that he lied to Felicia about missing an important business meeting. Also, Keisha becomes concerned as Terrence's past life may impact his budding relationship with Raquel.
33	8	"Tell You No Lies"	Tamra Davis	Nelson Soler	February 24, 2014	1.71
Raquel continues to date Grant without mixing business and pleasure. Meanwhile, April lands a new client which brews jealousy within David. Malcolm's past dealings come to the fore. Also, Omar's work relationship with Price Management causes a rift with Nate. Keisha learns that Naomi has involvement with Malcolm and Sean.
34	9	"Cat and Mouse"	Michael Schultz	Story by : Yolanda E. Lawrence; Teleplay by : Tamiko K. Brooks & Yolanda E. Lawrence	March 3, 2014	1.65
Raquel is held hostage by the ruthless Deacon, and the Malcolm believes that Naomi may know where she is located. Tension continues to rise between Omar and Nate. April begins to see David in a new light while out on a date with he and his friends. Meanwhile, Keisha is paid a visit from an old friend.
35	10	"Game On"	Michael Schultz	Story by : Dayna Lynne North; Teleplay by : Deborah Swisher	March 10, 2014	1.55
Raquel decides to host a game night but struggles to keep her new romance with Terrence a secret. Meanwhile, Keisha expresses her concerns about Terrence to Raquel. April invites David while Omar is accompanied by an unexpected guest. In hopes of making things right with Keisha, Malcolm makes desperate moves to end his association with Deacon and Naomi.
36	11	"One Step Forward, Two Steps Back"	Tamra Davis	Dana Schmalenberg	March 17, 2014	1.53
Raquel and Terrence's relationship hits a crossroad as the two clash over their dating expectations. Keisha learns that Malcolm is keeping another secret from her. Meanwhile, April is placed in a dangerous position at Price Management by David's latest scheme. Omar's latest designs for Felicia are the inspiration for knockoffs.
37	12	"Last Dance"	Tamra Davis	Dayna Lynne North	March 24, 2014	1.94
Keisha and Malcolm come to a mutual understanding of both placing the past behind them. Meanwhile, Raquel and Terrence drift further apart. April is assigned by Felicia to perform a task out-of-town and, in turn, runs into a former flame. Omar negotiates a new venture that could unite two of his friends in an unexpected way.

=== Season 4 (2015) ===
No. overall	No. in season	Title	Directed by	Written by	Original release date	US viewers (millions)
38	1	"Gone"	Felicia D. Henderson	Felicia D. Henderson & Charles D. Holland	March 18, 2015	0.167
Several months later, the police begin an intense investigation on the disappearance of Raquel. Everyone that was close to her --including Terrence-- is brought in for questioning as they rule out the case as a homicide. Elsewhere, Felicia is on a search for new talent. Roshanda, Raquel's half-sister, arrives in Atlanta and is taken under Omar's wing. April has to deal with her younger sister. Also, Keisha is arrested.
39	2	"Remix"	Jeff Byrd	Sara Finney-Johnson	March 25, 2015	0.186
The D.A. continues to pressure Keisha in revealing the whereabouts of Malcolm. Well-known socialite and social media queen Austin Aguilera (Melissa De Sousa) begins a business venture with Terrence. Meanwhile, April begins to scout new talent for Felicia but is having a hard time landing a popular artist. Also, Felicia is in the midst of a divorce. Note: This episode was presented as a sneak peek and aired exclusively on March 18, 2015.
40	3	"Build"	Dawn Wilkinson	Matthew Claybrooks	April 1, 2015	0.221
Felicia is experiencing differences with her new girl group, Triple Threat. With co-operating a new club venture with partner Austin, Terrence's personal problems arise as he tries to search for answers involving Raquel's disappearance. Meanwhile, April makes a tough decision on leaving Atlanta for a new job offer in London. Guest starring: Zoë Soul, Karrueche Tran
41	4	"New"	Jeff Byrd	Wendy Coulas	April 8, 2015	0.232
Omar is experiencing difficulties with his new job position. Coping with recent news of her father's stroke, Austin turns to alcohol as an outlet. Roshanda continues to get adjust to life in Atlanta and decides to offer Austin a place to stay in her newly-acquired apartment. Meanwhile, Terrence makes a deal with Maximus in return for information on Raquel. Also, Keisha's time in jail may be shortened.
42	5	"Truth"	Dawn Wilkinson	Lamont Magee	April 15, 2015	0.242
Sharon Love returns as Omar and Price Entertainment try to land a deal for Triple Threat to appear on her talk show. Austin visits her ailing father in the hospital but their rocky relationship remains. Meanwhile, Karen Bridges, the mother of Casey, persuades Breelyn to ditch the group in order to get back at Felicia. Guest starring: Zoë Soul, Anthony Sherwood, Sharon Leal, Queen Latifah
43	6	"Consequences"	Felicia D. Henderson	Felicia D. Henderson & Vincent Pagano	April 22, 2015	0.296
Felicia and Omar are at odds over creative differences at Price Management. Meanwhile, bad publicity hovers around Austin, infuriating Sharon Love in the process. Roshanda's ex-boyfriend returns with an agenda. Also, Terrence finally has found the lead that he needed on Raquel's murderer. Guest starring: Zoë Soul, Bobby Ray Simmons, Queen Latifah

== Production ==
The show was tested as a movie before being turned into a 12-episode series. Executive director Olde reports that "TV, sometimes, under the best of circumstances, is a gut business," and went on to say that, after testing the script, the response was good enough for them to develop it into the series. Single Ladies is produced two episodes at a time to save money. Initially the program received reasonable ratings. The two-hour premiere gained a 1.2 rating in the 18–49 demographic with 2.8 million total viewers. It also scored a slightly higher 2.0 rating in the 18–34 female demographic. Latifah says she is "particularly proud" of the series, stating that "We wanted the ladies to be able to talk about mature things. (Sex and the City) was an inspiration, but the real inspiration was real life ... These are virile women who have emotions and desires, and they will be out there looking, but they'll do it on their own terms." Writer Littlejohn believes that Single Ladies could be a "jewel in the crown" for VH1." She also said that she feels like she is breaking new ground and setting a precedent, where VH1 and scripted shows are concerned, saying "I’m creating the formula". Stacey Dash decided to exit the series after its inaugural season. Dash commented, "I have to be back in L.A. with my children right now and the Single Ladies shooting location [in Atlanta] makes this impossible." She will be replaced by All My Children alumna Denise Vasi.

On August 22, 2012, VH1 renewed the series for a third season to premiere in late 2013. It was announced in September 2012, that Single Ladies' creator and executive producer Stacy A. Littlejohn had chosen to leave after the second season. Littlejohn stated, "After two incredible seasons of Single Ladies, I have decided to entrust the show to the safe hands of VH1. Having fostered it from its inception, I’ve found great satisfaction in seeing these characters come to life on the screen, and am proud of what the show has become. But after two all-consuming seasons immersed in its production in the great city of Atlanta, I’ve decided it’s time to shift my focus to my life in Los Angeles and the creation of new projects." On May 20, 2013, the arrival of three new cast members was revealed: Letoya Luckett, Damien Wayans, Lesley-Ann Brandt were signed on as recurring cast members. ADR recording for the series was done at recording studio Cherry Beach Sound.

== Tie-ins ==
To coincide with the third season, the series launched an e-book series. Written by New York Times author Ashley Antoinette, the e-book series helped to serve as a companion to the drama series picking up after the second-season finale.

- Single Ladies: April No Sex in the City: 1. Released November 26, 2013.
- Single Ladies: Raquel Trois: 2. Released December 3, 2013.
- Single Ladies: Keisha A Couple of Forevers: 3. Released December 10, 2013.
- Single Ladies: Three Stories (Bundle). Released December 17, 2013.

== Reception ==
Critical reception of Single Ladies was not too favorable, Media Life Magazine reporter Tom Conroy reported that, "The female characters are either one-note (Keisha), inscrutable (April) or incoherent (Val). It’s unfair to blame the actresses. The writers are the ones who can’t decide if Val, for example, is the kind of girl who would make men wait 90 days or the kind of girl who would use a phrase like "tap this" referring to herself."

Ginia Bellafante of The New York Times reports that ""Single Ladies" has issues with black men, who are depicted as way too self-regarding, and blond women, who are simply taking up too much space on the planet. Not altogether predictably, the show reserves a certain kindness for that forgotten minority: the boyish white man. Apparently "Single Ladies" has yet to see "The Hangover Part II"." Hank Steuver of The Washington Post said that, "It's the TV equivalent of a beach read with no words. Even if "Single Ladies" can be enjoyed in some basic brainless way (and even though it's safely sequestered on VH1, where standards are aggressively low), there's something steadfastly embarrassing about it."

Britni Danielle of clutchmagonline.com said "VH1 released the trailer for its new show, Single Ladies over the weekend and it looks promising!" and went on to say that "With shows like Basketball Wives, What Chili Wants, and Lets Talk About Pep, VH1 has been trying hard to produce (reality) shows that appeal to Black women. Let’s hope this new one is worth our time."

David Hinckley of the NYDailyNews.com said "In any case, Single Ladies has stretches when it gets stuck in its own cliches and must fight its way through the soap suds." going on to add, "But it comes out the other side not looking half-bad. By the end of the first episode, it has created three distinct characters whose vulnerability and basic decency make us like them in spite of some obvious flaws." He went on to say, "There's a lot of soap, and the dialogue can make you wince. But the characters just might make you care."
