= Nicole Marie Lenz =

American model and actress

- Occupations: Model, actress, yoga teacher
- Children: 1
- Website: nicolelenzofficial.com

Nicole Marie Lenz, known professionally as Nicole Lenz, (born January 24, 1980) is an American model and actress.

== Career ==
Lenz began modeling during her teenage years. Her breakthrough as a high-profile model began with a feature in W magazine photographed by Mario Sorrenti, which subsequently led to her signing an international modeling contract with Elite Model Management.

During her international modeling career Lenz was featured in high-fashion editorials for Vogue Russia and Vogue Italia. Her Vogue Italia editorial was photographed by David LaChapelle. Lenz has been featured on the covers of French Playboy, Italian Max, and American Health magazine, on which she appeared twice.

In 2007, Lenz was featured in FHM magazine as "The New Bardot" and ranked in the top "100 Sexiest Women" list published by Stuff magazine later that year.

Lenz appeared in Playboy magazine's Millennium issue. Her feature was styled as a tribute to Marilyn Monroe, whose appearance as Playboy's first Playmate had been featured in the magazine's inaugural issue.

Lenz made her film debut in August 2003 in Confidence, starring Dustin Hoffman and Edward Burns and has since appeared in several independent and feature films, including My Sister's Keeper starring Cameron Diaz, Seeing Other People, Toxic, and Fanboys produced by the Weinstein Company. She also appeared in an episode of CSI: NY, "Playing with Matches" in 2008.

Lenz has also appeared in music videos for artists including Elton John "This Train Don't Stop Here Anymore" and Duran Duran's 2005 music video for "What Happens Tomorrow".

== Other Ventures ==
Lenz later expanded her professional work into yoga and meditation. She became an E-RYT 500 yoga teacher and developed online educational content and programs relating to yoga, meditation, and personal development since 2014.

== Filmography ==
- My Sister's Keeper
- Fanboys
- Kush
- Toxic
- TV: The Movie
- Confidence
- Rent Control

| Carol and Darlene Bernaola | Suzanne Stokes | Nicole Lenz | Brande Roderick | Brooke Berry | Shannon Stewart |
| Neferteri Shepherd | Summer Altice | Kerissa Fare | Nichole Van Croft | Buffy Tyler | Cara Michelle |
