= Bianca Chiminello =

Australian model and actress

- Born: 1976 (age 49–50); Melbourne, Victoria, Australia
- Occupations: Actress, model
- Years active: 2000–2011
- Spouse: Channon Roe (m. 2009)
- Children: 1

Bianca Chiminello (born 1976) is an Australian model and actress best known for her role as Jenavian Charto on the television series Farscape. She is also known for her role in David Fincher's The Curious Case of Benjamin Button, starring Brad Pitt and Cate Blanchett.

== Early life ==
Chiminello was brought up in a single-parent family in the bohemian suburb of Fitzroy in Melbourne, Australia. As a child, Bianca's first love was dance; she trained as a classical ballerina with the Victorian Ballet School under the guidance of Dianne Parrington. Bianca Chiminello attended Methodist Ladies' College; during her education she was discovered by a modeling agent and started working whilst finishing her high school certificate.

== Career ==
=== Fashion modeling ===
In 1993, while still in the middle of her high school studies, she won Ford Models' Supermodel of the World Contest (Australia) and was subsequently signed with Ford Models and taken to New York City, where she lived with Eileen Ford and worked with the publications Allure, Seventeen, She, Elle, Harper's Bazaar and Vogue. Chiminello is currently represented by Industry Models. After completing her studies, she lived in Europe and was in advertising campaigns for Giorgio Armani, Emporio Armani, Moschino and Escada.

Chiminello has walked for fashion shows such as Armani, Burberry, Moschino, Hussein Callahan, Collette Dinnigan, and Dolce & Gabbana Chiminello is known for her style and individual approach; she has always been a chameleon to photographers and designers alike, being compared to Linda Evangelista.

=== Acting ===
Chiminello's studied in Australia at St Martin's, The National Theatre, with the Dean of Acting and Voice at NIDA and currently works with Hollywood-famous Ivanah Chubbuck. In 2000, Chiminello appeared in the hit Sci-Fi series Farscape. Her character, Jenavian Charto, was so popular with audiences that Chiminello was called upon to appear at conventions around the United States. Because of the overwhelming demand and audience response, she relocated to Los Angeles in 2004 to pursue a full-time film career. Bianca Chiminello has worked on the independent features Toxic, due for release through The Weinstein Company in June 2008, and Devils Highway.

Her first acting assignment for American television was as a guest star on the hit USA Network series Monk opposite Tony Shalhoub. Chiminello's natural comic timing was evident and she has since gone on to appear as a guest star in comedy shows: Emily's Reasons Why Not, opposite Heather Graham, Ugly Betty with America Ferrera and the 2007 break-out show for ABC Dirty Sexy Money with Donald Sutherland, Peter Krause and Samaire Armstrong. She also appeared in a 2008 episode of Chuck as Fulcrum Agent "Juliette".

Chiminello was chosen to play the best friend to Cate Blanchett in the David Fincher-directed The Curious Case of Benjamin Button, also starring Brad Pitt, released in 2008. Chiminello is currently represented by RGM in Australia, which also represents Blanchett.

Bianca Chiminello appeared in the January 2009 issue of Sunday Life's Magazine "Fresh Crop", five young Australian actors who are shaping up to be Hollywood's Next Big Things.... She wrapped the lead in an Australian film, Living Between Fu$ks as "The Beautiful Financial Backer", based on a novel of the same title.

=== Producing ===
In 2007 Chiminello explored producing and made an independent feature film, Japan, starring Peter Fonda, Shane Brolly and herself. Synopsis: Code name Japan is a contract killer on a job. Accustomed to staying in hotels, Japan (Shane Brolly) finds himself jet-lagged in the middle of the night and forced to eat in the hotel restaurant, room service being closed. There, he meets a man, Alfred (Peter Fonda). Alfred was recently evicted from their marital home by his now ex-wife (Bianca Chiminello) and now lives at the hotel. A loner befriends another loner, and their unexpected friendship leads their faith to a twist and turn ending.

== Filmography ==
=== Film ===
- Living Between Fu$ks – The Beautiful Financial Backer (2009)
- The Curious Case of Benjamin Button – Daisy's Best Friend, Ballerina who breaks shoelace (2008)
- Japan – Sarah Costra, Producer (2008)
- Toxic – Raven (2007)
- Devil's Highway – Mayor's Wife (2005)
- Peace One Day (documentary) – Herself (2004)
- Farscape Undressed (TV documentary) – Jenavian Charto (2001)

=== Television ===
- Chuck (TV series) – Fulcrum Agent ~ Juliette
  - Chuck Versus the Break-Up – (2008)
- Dirty Sexy Money (TV series) – Princess Astrid Esterhazy (3 episodes, 2007) –
  - The Watch – Princess Astrid Esterhazy (2007)
  - "The Bridge" – Princess Astrid Esterhazy (2007)
  - "The Chiavennasca" – Princess Astrid Esterhazy (2007)
- Ugly Betty (TV series) – "Mode Girl" (1 episode, 2007)
  - "Swag" – Mode Girl (2007)
- Emily's Reasons Why Not (TV series) – Vinessa (1 episode, 2006)
  - "Why Not to Date a Twin" – Vinessa (2006)
- Charmed (TV series) – Avatar (1 episode, 2005)
  - "Vaya Con Leos" – Avatar (2005(
- Monk (TV series) – Wine Expert (1 episode, 2005)
  - "Mr. Monk Gets Drunk" – Wine Expert 2005
- The Lost World (TV movie) – Queen Selena 2001
- BeastMaster (TV series) – Aviana (1 episode, 2001)
  - "Birds" – Aviana 2001
- The Lost World (TV series) – Queen Selena (1 episode, 2000)
  - Amazons – Queen Selena 2000
- Farscape (TV series) – Jenavian Charto / Jenavian Charto (3 episodes, 2000)
  - "Look at the Princess: Part 3: The Maltese Crichton" – Jenavian Charto (2000)
  - "Look at the Princess: Part 2: I Do, I Think" – Jenavian Charto (2000)
  - "Look at the Princess: Part 1: A Kiss Is But a Kiss" – Jenavian Charto (2000)
- Looking Good (TV series) – Herself (1999)
- E! News (TV series) – Herself (unknown episodes, 1998)
- Ford Supermodel of the World (TV movie) – Herself (1993)
