= Jennifer Miller (actress) =

Canadian actress

Jennifer Miller is a Canadian actress, best known for her role as the telekinetic Alex in Five Girls. She trained at Armstrong Acting Studios in Toronto and has also starred in many teen TV series including The Best Years and Radio Free Roscoe.

== Filmography ==
=== Film ===
Year	Title	Role	Notes
2004	Pizza Man vs. the Dude	Park Wife	
2006	Lucky Number Slevin	Slevin's Girlfriend	
2006	5ive Girls	Alex	
2006	American Pie Presents: The Naked Mile	Blonde at Bar	
2009	Bitch Slap	Lap Vixen Thumper	
2013	Poker Night	Portia	

=== Television ===
Year	Title	Role	Notes
2003	Radio Free Roscoe	Erin Kiminsky	Episode: "The Imposter"
2004	Strange Days at Blake Holsey High	Kirstie Edwards	Episode: "Allure"
2005	Naturally, Sadie	Leila	Episode: "Best of Breed"
2005	Beautiful People	Claudette	5 episodes
2006	Instant Star	Bea	Episode: "I Fought the Law"
2006	Dark Oracle	Holly	Episode: "It Happened at the Dance"
2007	Little Mosque on the Prairie	Sandy Sharp	Episode: "Five Year Plan"
2007–2009	The Best Years	Kathryn Klarner	21 episodes
2008	Sophie	Beautiful Actress	Episode: "Groove Thing"
2008	True Confessions of a Hollywood Starlet	Bully	Television film
2010	Turn the Beat Around	Steph	Television film
2016	This Life	Lianne	Episode: "Choose Life"
2017	FANatic	Hot Fan	Television film
2017	Real Detective	Shirley Williams	Episode: "Lambs to the Slaughter"
