= Kolobos =

- DVD released by Metrodome
- Directed by: Daniel Liatowitsch; David Todd Ocvirk
- Written by: Nne Ebong; Daniel Liatowitsch; David Todd Ocvirk
- Produced by: Edward R. Taylor
- Starring: Amy Weber; Donny Terranova; Nichole Pelerine; John Fairlie; Promise LaMarco; Ilia Volok; Simms Thomas
- Cinematography: Yoram Astrakhan
- Edited by: Brian Olson
- Music by: William Kidd
- Production company: Armitage Pictures
- Release date: September 28, 1999
- Running time: 84 minutes
- Country: United States
- Language: English
- Budget: $500,000

Kolobos (also known as Haunted House) is a 1999 American independent slasher film that was directed by Daniel Liatowitsch and David Todd Ocvirk. The film was released on September 28, 1999, through Armitage Pictures.

== Plot summary ==
The film cuts between scenes of a hospitalized woman who was discovered with severe facial lacerations, speaking only the word "kolobos", as well as a group of young adults who have answered a personal ad seeking people to participate in a Big Brother-esque film. The group is made up of the director, Carl, and five participants, the peppy Tina, actress Erica, Tom the jokester, and Gary the college dropout. The fifth member, Kyra, is an artist living in a group home and taking anxiety medications.

Soon after they arrive the group discovers that the house is full of deadly traps, one of which kills TIna, and that they have been locked inside with no way to contact the outside world. Kyra begins to experience strange visions, but she is uncertain if they are a product of her mind or some external person or entity. She also sees a man in black, who murders Carl and Gary. Tom and Erica discover that several of Kyra's drawings resemble the traps and deaths seen thus far and suspect her of being the murderer. They lock her in a bathroom and head into the basement to search for an exit, only for a trap to kill Erica. Kyra manages to escape from the bathroom and goes in search of the others. She comes across Tom, who goes missing soon after. She eventually makes her way into one of the basement rooms, where the man in black has strung up his victims to resemble Kyra's drawings. He and Kyra then struggle, during which she manages to kill him with a pool cue before escaping.

The film cuts to the hospital, where the doctor tells Kyra that they were unable to find any evidence of the crimes or house. The doctor then implies that no one ever attacked Kyra and that she wounded herself. Indignant, Kyra returns to her home where she begins to hallucinate voices and imagine the traps from the house while saying that it's "just me". She then hears the voice of the man in black, which is coming from a straight razor that she uses to cut herself. The voice tells her that there is something that it wants her to do. She is then shown placing an identical order to the one given at the beginning of the film, revealing that the events were all in her head and that she is now planning to make them a reality.

== Cast ==
- Amy Weber as Kyra
- Donny Terranova as Tom
- Nichole Pelerine as Erica
- John Fairlie as Gary
- Promise LaMarco as Tina
- Ilia Volok as "Faceless"
- Simms Thomas as Dr. Waldman
- Todd Beadle as Dr. Jurgen
- Mari Weiss as Lucille
- Jonathan Rone as Carl
- Linnea Quigley as Dorothy
- Ivan Battee as Detective Byers

== Production ==
Filming for the movie took place in Omaha, Nebraska. During filming the movie's original ending had to be scrapped as a filter had been left on the camera from a prior external shot. This ending would have featured Kyra and Dorothy talking in an art gallery, after which Kyra would mutilate her face with a straight razor in the gallery's bathroom. Minus this scene, Kolobos was to end with Kyra escaping the house. This was changed after the editor noticed that the completed movie was only 64 minutes long and would need additional scenes to extend the runtime. Ocvirk has stated that it was difficult writing the additional scenes as he, Ebong, and Liatowitsch all disagreed on how the narrative should progress. It was ultimately decided that the movie should conclude with the revelation that it was all in Kyra's head, resulting in the scenes of Kyra's rescue, time in the hospital, and closing scenes.

== Reception ==
Critical reception for Kolobos was mixed to negative, with the Fresno Bee panning the film overall. Beyond Hollywood gave a mixed review where they heavily criticized the film's acting but stated that overall it was a "worthwhile viewing experience". In contrast, DVD Verdict praised the film's acting and commented that Kolobos had "replay value". Flickering Myth noted that the film drew heavy inspiration from Italian cinema, writing "try listening to the main theme and not thinking of Suspiria".
