= Mister World 2000 =

3rd Mister World competition, male beauty pageant edition

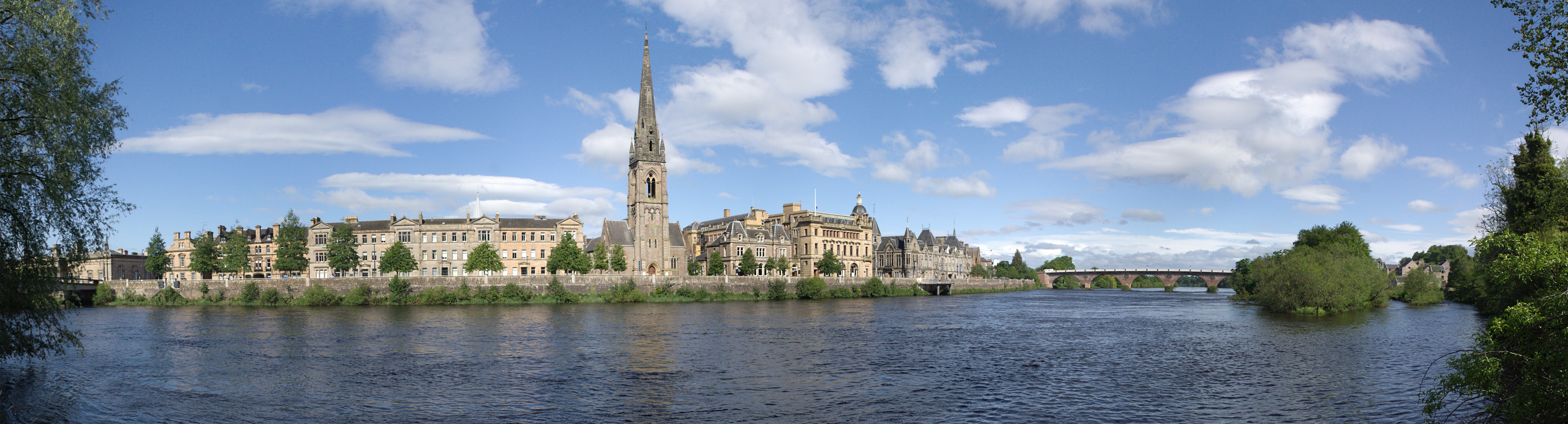
- Perth, host city for Mister World 2000
- Date: 13 October 2000
- Presenters: Steve Douglas
- Venue: Crieff Hydro Hotel, Perth, Scotland
- Entrants: 32
- Debuts: Angola; Bahamas; Guatemala; Hong Kong China; Zambia
- Withdrawals: Austria; Egypt; France; Holland; Hungary; India; Italy; Jamaica; Latvia; Malaysia; Malta; Norway; Peru; Poland; Portugal; Slovakia
- Returns: Bulgaria
- Winner: Ignacio Kliche; Uruguay

Mister World 2000 was the third Mister World competition, held at the Crieff Hydro Hotel in Perthshire, Scotland, on October 13, 2000. Sandro Finoglio of Venezuela crowned Ignacio Kliche of Uruguay at the end of the event.

== Results ==
=== Placements ===
Placement	Contestant
Mister World 2000	Uruguay – Ignacio Kliche Longardi
1st Runner-Up	Germany – Marcello Barkowski
2nd Runner-Up	United States – Dante Spencer
Top 5	Bahamas – Neil Paris Dames; Croatia – Lav Stipić
Top 10	Argentina – Matias Beck; Brazil – Ramilio Zampiron Júnior; Lebanon – Omar Mehyo; Mexico – Guido Quiles; Venezuela – Alejandro Otero Lárez

== Contestants ==
Country	Contestant	Age	Height	Hometown
Angola	Jorge Nelson dos Santos Clemente	25	1.85 m (6 ft 1 in)	Luanda
Argentina	Matias Beck	23	1.90 m (6 ft 3 in)	Buenos Aires
Bahamas	Neil Paris Dames	25	1.84 m (6 ft 1/2 in)	Nassau
Belgium	Maurizio Milazzo	25	1.86 m (6 ft 1 in)	Limburg
Bolivia	Wilson Rojas Cuellar	23	1.85 m (6 ft 1 in)	Cochabamba
Brazil	Ramilio Zampiron Júnior	27	1.86 m (6 ft 1 in)	Brasília
Bulgaria	Angel Bonev	23	1.92 m (6 ft 3 1/2 in)	Sofia
Colombia	Ángel Ulloa Rodríguez	20	1.87 m (6 ft 1 1/2 in)	Medellín
Croatia	Lav Stipić	21	1.89 m (6 ft 2 1/2 in)	Zagreb
Germany	Marcello Barkowski	22	1.88 m (6 ft 2 in)	Berlin
Greece	Christos Dimas	23	1.86 m (6 ft 1 in)	Athens
Guatemala	Juan Pablo Olyslager Muñoz	25	1.80 m (5 ft 11 in)	Guatemala City
Hong Kong	Ming Lok Lam	19	1.78 m (5 ft 10 in)	Hong Kong
Ireland	Padraig Hearns	25	1.83 m (6 ft 0 in)	County Wicklow
Israel	Eran Eliyahoo	24	1.85 m (6 ft 1 in)	Haifa
Lebanon	Omar Mehyo	21	1.83 m (6 ft 0 in)	Beirut
Mexico	Guido Quiles	23	1.90 m (6 ft 3 in)	Mexico City
Philippines	Roderick Dilla Salvador	24	1.83 m (6 ft 0 in)	Baguio
Puerto Rico	Frank Daniel Rodríguez Robles	26	1.88 m (6 ft 2 in)	Ponce
Russia	Yuriy Yegorov	21	1.91 m (6 ft 3 in)	Yekaterinburg
Singapore	Lionel Loke Yee Lui	25	1.78 m (5 ft 10 in)	Singapore
Slovenia	Jurij Bradač	27	1.87 m (6 ft 1 1/2 in)	Maribor
Spain	Manuel Roldán García	25	1.88 m (6 ft 2 in)	Andalucía
Sri Lanka	Duminda de Silva	27	1.82 m (5 ft 11 1/2 in)	Colombo
Turkey	Şenol İpek	24	1.84 m (6 ft 1/2 in)	Istanbul
Ukraine	Maxim Yali	21	1.85 m (6 ft 1 in)	Kyiv
United Kingdom	Mark John Phoenix	22	1.90 m (6 ft 3 in)	Aberdeen
United States	Dante Spencer	24	1.89 m (6 ft 2 1/2 in)	San Diego
Uruguay	Ignacio Kliche Longardi	22	1.84 m (6 ft 1/2 in)	Montevideo
Venezuela	Alejandro Otero Lárez	26	1.87 m (6 ft 1 1/2 in)	Caracas
Yugoslavia	Nikola Bogdanović	25	1.92 m (6 ft 3 1/2 in)	Novi Sad
Zambia	Kabanda Lilanda	20	1.80 m (5 ft 11 in)	Lusaka
