= In the Mix (TV series) =

American television series

- Created by: Sue Castle
- Starring: Tamah; Eddie; Andrea; Melanie; Duane; Nathan; Julio; Andrew
- Country of origin: United States
- No. of episodes: 65

Production
- Producers: WNYC; WNET
- Running time: 30 minutes

Original release
- Network: PBS
- Release: January 31, 1993 – 2012

In the Mix is an American television series for young adults that covers a wide variety of critical issues and provides useful life skill information.

== Format and themes ==
In the Mix is a series that aired on PBS Kids for teenagers and young adults aged 14–21. Each half-hour single theme episode typically includes several segments devoted to a serious issues facing youth, including school violence, mental illness, drugs, employment training, and interpersonal relationships. In addition, the programs are often co-hosted by celebrities.

All the hosts and reporters featured on In the Mix are teens or young adults; several have gone on to careers in the fields of entertainment or journalism, including Jason Biggs, Kevin Jordan, Alimi Ballard, Nathan Marshall, Janine Acquafredda and Eden Regal.

== Syndication ==
As of Spring 2016, "In the Mix" continues to air on select PBS stations, primarily in educational blocks, and is also broadcast to Canada. The current catalogue comprises 65 half-hour single theme programmes. All programmes are available for purchase as DVDs, with most including discussion guides and some offering Spanish subtitles as an option. These programmes are utilised in middle school through college settings, including for teacher and counsellor training.

== Selected awards and honors ==
Emmy Awards

- Community Service Programming
- Teen Special

CINE Golden Eagle Award: 8

Academy of Television Arts & Sciences: Honor Roll of Quality Youth Programming

PRISM Awards: 3

- Ecstasy
- Drug Abuse
- Meth...Not Even Once

Additionally, "In the Mix" has received recognition from various national educational and health organizations. The series won the National Mental Health Association's Media Award for its coverage of depression in teenagers. Various episodes of the show have also been included on the Young Adult Library Services Association's lists of selected videos.

== Notes and references ==
- "In The Mix TV Series". PBS.
