= Dante Spencer =

American actor, model and male pageant titleholder

Dante Spencer (born 1976) is an American actor, model and beauty pageant titleholder who represented the United States at Mister World 2000 and placed 2nd Runner-Up.

== Acting ==
As an actor, he has appeared in Dating Games People Play (2006) and In a Different Key (2008). He also landed roles on television series shows such as Sabrina, the Teenage Witch, The Andy Dick Show, Half & Half, Jerks With Cameras and The Real.

Spencer caught media attention in the summer of 2005 when he dated American Idol judge Paula Abdul, whom he escorted to the Emmy awards.

Dante Spencer is graduated from UCSD where he minored in Biology with an emphasis in Nutrition. He was a nutritionist for many years and holds several health and fitness related certifications (NSCA CSCS, APEX, NASM). He's been featured on the cover of Men's Health magazine three times and received his master's degree in Spiritual Psychology.

== Filmography ==
Television

- The Andy Dick Show Rufus (1 episode, 2001)
- The Nick Cannon Show (1 episode, 2002)
- Sabrina, the Teenage Witch (1 episode, 2002)
- Half & Half (1 episode, 2006)
- Jerks With Cameras (10 episodes, 2014)
- The Real (5 episodes, 2015)

== Film ==
- Dating Games People Play (2006)
- In a Different Key (2008)
- The Jokesters (2015)

== Published works ==
- How to Lose Weight in Your Sleep: Easy No Diet Weight Loss Secrets to Be at Your Dream Weight
