= Maria Barros (fashion designer) =

Spanish fashion designer

- Born: 27 January 1980 (age 46); A Coruña, Spain
- Education: Istituto Europeo di Design
- Occupation: Founder of Maria Barros
- Label: Maria Barros

Maria Barros (27 January 1980) is a fashion designer born in La Coruña, Spain.

== Career ==
She studied Fashion Design in Istituto Europeo di Design in Milan. Her final thesis is conducted by the editor-in-chief of Vogue Italia, Franca Sozzani. At the age of 21, she is awarded with the "Moët & Chandon Young Fashion Award" to the best young fashion designer in Europe. This prize is given by the National Chamber of Italian Fashion in the city of Milan, which organizes her first fashion show during Milan Fashion Week. After some experience working with designers like Roberto Cavalli in Florencia, Modesto Lomba in Madrid, or Pupi Solari in Milan, she founds her own brand: Maria Barros. Since then, she has shown her collections in various international fashion weeks, such as Pasarela Gaudi or the Milan Fashion Week.
