= Neighborhood Watch (White Collar) =

- White Collar episode
- Episode no.: Season 3 Episode 13
- Directed by: Andrew McCarthy
- Written by: Jeff F. King
- Original air date: January 31, 2012

Guest appearances
- Joe Manganiello as Ben Ryan; Lola Glaudini as Rebecca Ryan; Will Chase as Connor Bailey; Murphy Guyer; Chuck Cooper; Sharif Atkins as Clinton Jones

Episode chronology
← Previous "Upper West Side Story"	Next → "Pulling Strings"

"Neighborhood Watch" is the 13th episode of the third season of the American comedy-drama television series White Collar, and the 43rd episode overall. It was first broadcast on USA Network in the United States on January 31, 2012. The episode was directed by Andrew McCarthy and written by Jeff F. King.

The episode has been noted to draw many themes from Alfred Hitchcock's Rear Window. When Elizabeth Burke (Tiffani Thiessen) overhears a neighbor (Joe Manganiello) discussing a future crime, she, Mozzie (Willie Garson), and Neal Caffrey (Matt Bomer) work together to prove his guilt.

According to the Nielsen ratings system, an estimated 3.042 million household viewers watched the original broadcast of the episode, with 1.0 million in the 18–49 demographic. "Neighborhood Watch" received mostly positive reviews, with many complimenting Thiessen's performance.

== Plot ==
After Peter Burke (Tim DeKay) leaves a scanner at home, Elizabeth overhears plans for a robbery. Peter visits the scene of the alleged crime, but finds nothing to suggest that the robbery exists. Neal and Peter attribute Elizabeth’s actions to paranoia stemming from her recent kidnapping by Matthew Keller. However, Mozzie believes that the robbery was real, and begins helping Elizabeth monitor Peter’s scanner. Mozzie and Elizabeth soon hear the same voices from the original transmission, and discover that they are the voices of the Burke’s new neighbors, Ben (Manganiello) and Rebecca Ryan (Lola Glaudini). Elizabeth immediately visits their house, coercing an invitation for dinner that night. While at dinner, Elizabeth excuses herself from the table in order to search the house. She discovers nothing, but soon finds herself locked in a bedroom. Neal, speaking to her through a window, walks her through picking the lock. However, she is soon found by an annoyed Peter.

Peter finally agrees to investigate the Ryans, quickly being informed by Diana Berrigan (Marsha Thomason) that Ben has an armed robbery conviction. As Peter phones Elizabeth to let her know that she was correct, Ben visits the Burke home and vaguely threatens Elizabeth. Clinton Jones (Sharif Atkins) follows Ben and discovers the identity of Ben’s partner: Connor Bailey (Will Chase). In order to get closer to the suspects, Neal visits Ben’s parole office under the alias Nick Halden. Using information gathered by Neal, Peter quickly realizes that the target of the heist is a luxury hotel. Peter and Neal hurry to the hotel, barely missing Ben and Connor. At the Burke home, Elizabeth and Mozzie follow Rebecca as she leaves the house. Realizing that Peter will not reach them in time, Elizabeth approaches the Ryans as an FBI agent. Her attempt fails just as Peter and the FBI arrive.

== Production ==
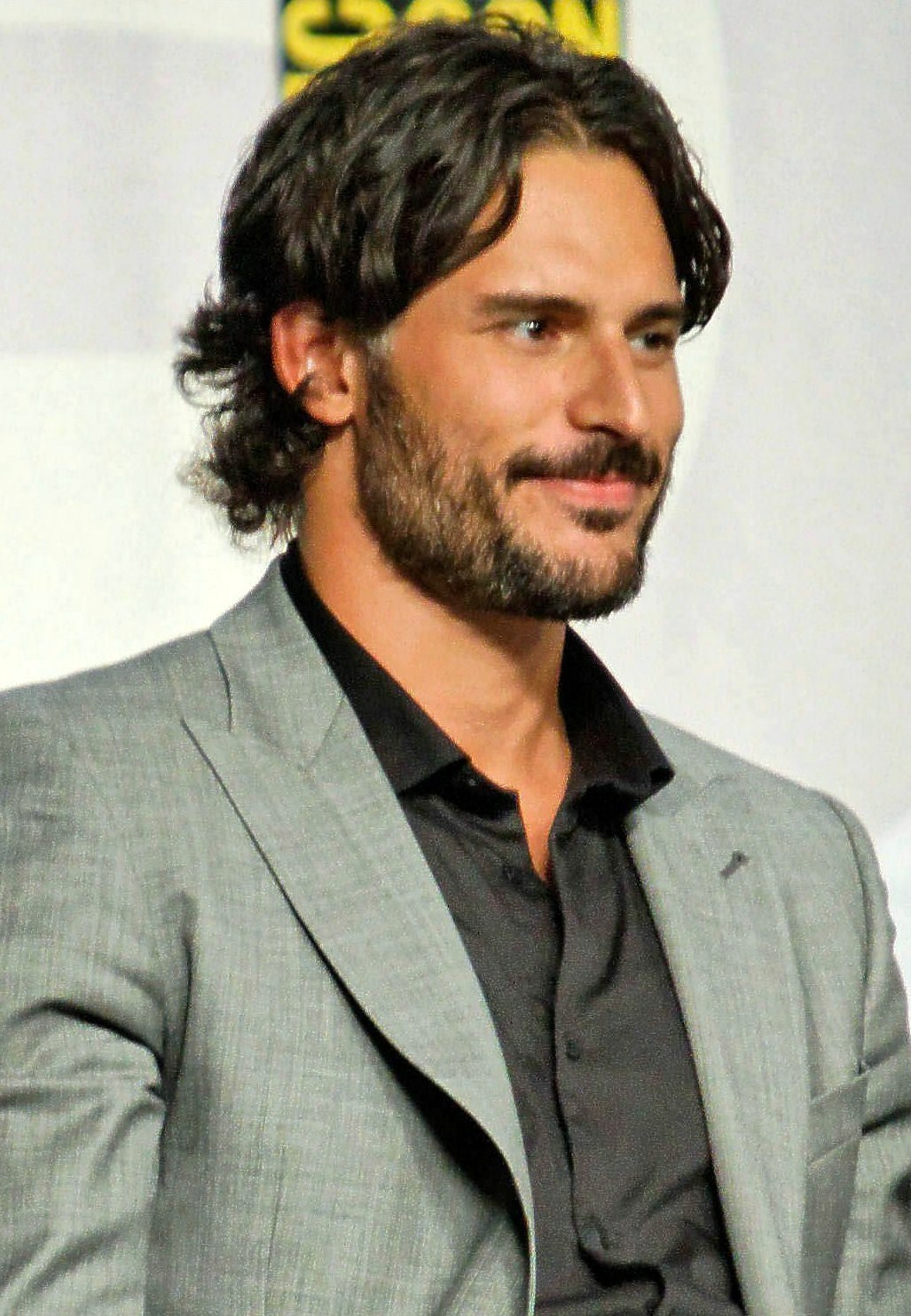
Joe Manganiello appeared in the episode as Ben Ryan.

It was first reported on June 30, 2011 that Joe Manganiello would appear in an episode of White Collar as an ex-con and the Burkes' new neighbor at some point during the second half of the season. A day after Manganiello's casting was announced, it was reported that Will Chase would appear in an episode with Manganiello as Connor Bailey, another ex-con. On July 11, 2011, series creator Jeff Eastin announced via Twitter that Andrew McCarthy would direct the episode. It was his first directing credit, though he had previously portrayed Vincent Adler during the second season.

"Neighborhood Watch" was written by Jeff F. King, his first writing credit after directing "Power Play" in the second season. Eastin has acknowledged that the episode contains various themes from Alfred Hitchcock's Rear Window, and that the idea had been in development for multiple seasons; many reviewers mentioned the theme as well. Tiffani Thiessen announced on July 26, 2011 that production had recently wrapped on the episode. On August 26, 2011, USA Network announced simultaneously with the fourth season renewal that Lola Glaudini would appear in the series; she ultimately appeared in "Neighborhood Watch" as Rebecca Ryan.

== Reception ==
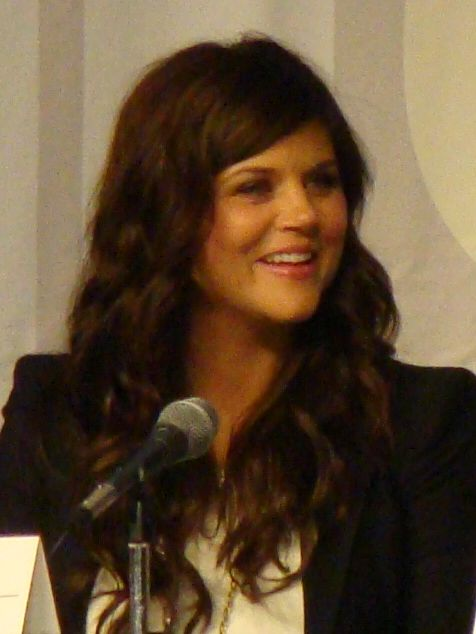
Tiffani Thiessen's performance as Elizabeth Burke was especially praised by critics.

=== Ratings ===
The initial broadcast of "Neighborhood Watch" was viewed by 3.042 million viewers, which at the time was the second-lowest of the series. It received 1.0 million viewers in the 18–49 demographic, down by approximately 0.1 million viewers from the previous week. The episode ranked eleventh overall in the 18–49 demographic for the night and finished fifth in its time slot, after Teen Mom 2, Tosh.0, The Game, and Justified.

=== Reviews ===
"Neighborhood Watch" received positive reviews, with many critics praising Tiffani Thiessen's larger role. Kenny Herzog of The A.V. Club gave the episode a mostly positive review, noting that Thiessen was "great as a catalyst for the action." He also compared the episode to the previous week's "Upper West Side Story", calling it "a nice reprieve after the previous 10-plus episodes' high drama." He ultimately gave the episode a B. C. Charles of TV Fanatic heavily praised the episode, calling it "a great hour" and "the Rear Window of the 21st century." Jessica Rae mentioned that the episode was "well thought-out and delightful," and praised Elizabeth's more prominent appearance. Brittany Frederick of Starpulse.com gave the episode a more mediocre review, calling it "fairly run-of-the-mill." She stated that Manganiello "has the glower down pat" and complimented the additional scenes between Thiessen and Willie Garson; however, she said that she hoped that the episode would mark the end of Elizabeth's recovery after her kidnapping.
