= Pulling Strings (White Collar) =

- White Collar episode
- Episode no.: Season 3 Episode 14
- Directed by: Anton Cropper
- Written by: Channing Powell
- Original air date: February 7, 2012

Guest appearances
- Diahann Carroll as June; Tom Skerritt as Alan Mitchell; Beau Bridges as Agent Kramer; Bailey Chase as Bryan McKenzie; Debra Monk as Mrs. Mitchell; Sharif Atkins as Clinton Jones

Episode chronology
← Previous "Neighborhood Watch"	Next → "Stealing Home"

"Pulling Strings" is the 14th episode of the third season of the American comedy-drama television series White Collar, and the 44th episode overall. It was first broadcast on USA Network in the United States on February 7, 2012. The episode was directed by Anton Cropper and written by Channing Powell.

In the episode, Peter Burke (Tim DeKay) assigns Neal Caffrey (Matt Bomer) to work with his former girlfriend, Sara Ellis (Hilarie Burton), to track down a missing Stradivarius violin. Meanwhile, Peter must deal with the arrival of Elizabeth's (Tiffani Thiessen) parents (Tom Skerritt and Debra Monk), who are in New York for their daughter's birthday.

According to the Nielsen ratings system, an estimated 2.469 million household viewers watched the original broadcast of the episode, with 0.8 million in the 18–49 demographic. "Pulling Strings" received mostly mixed to positive reviews from critics, with many praising individual elements of the episode.

== Plot ==
After taking vacation from work to be with his wife–and her parents–on her birthday, Peter turns Neal over to Sara in order to retrieve a missing Stradivarius that she believes was stolen by her former fiancé and current boss, Bryan McKenzie (Bailey Chase). Before beginning work on the case, Neal is approached by Agent Kramer (Beau Bridges), who is in New York to look into Neal's upcoming commutation hearing. Searching McKenzie's apartment, Neal discovers a hidden security tape. Meanwhile, Sara convinces him to attend the symphony with her. With help from June (Diahann Carroll), Neal and Diana Berrigan (Marsha Thomason) are able to go to the symphony as well. While they quickly discover that the second-chair violinist is the woman on the security video, McKenzie realizes that Neal is not exactly who he claims to be. While searching backstage, Neal and Diana find a body; they quickly recognize him as the symphony's instrument expert. Upon questioning the violinist from the security tape, Diana discovers that she had damaged the violin and had given it to the instrument expert for repairs. Sara approaches McKenzie with the information she has, pretending to want to join him. Diana and Neal soon arrive to arrest McKenzie, and Sara tells Neal to “call [her] sometime.”

Meanwhile, Peter suffers through the arrival of his in-laws. Everything goes wrong at Elizabeth's birthday: her parents give her a much-despised doll from her childhood, Peter's gift to Elizabeth does not turn out the way he had planned, and Elizabeth's father continues to disapprove of Peter. Peter eventually calls upon Mozzie (Willie Garson) for assistance, and together they right all of the wrongs.

Agent Kramer returns to the FBI to speak with Diana, who has recently announced her engagement to Christie. Kramer intimidates Diana, learning that she, Peter, and Jones (Sharif Atkins) have been covering up Neal's recent crimes.

== Production ==
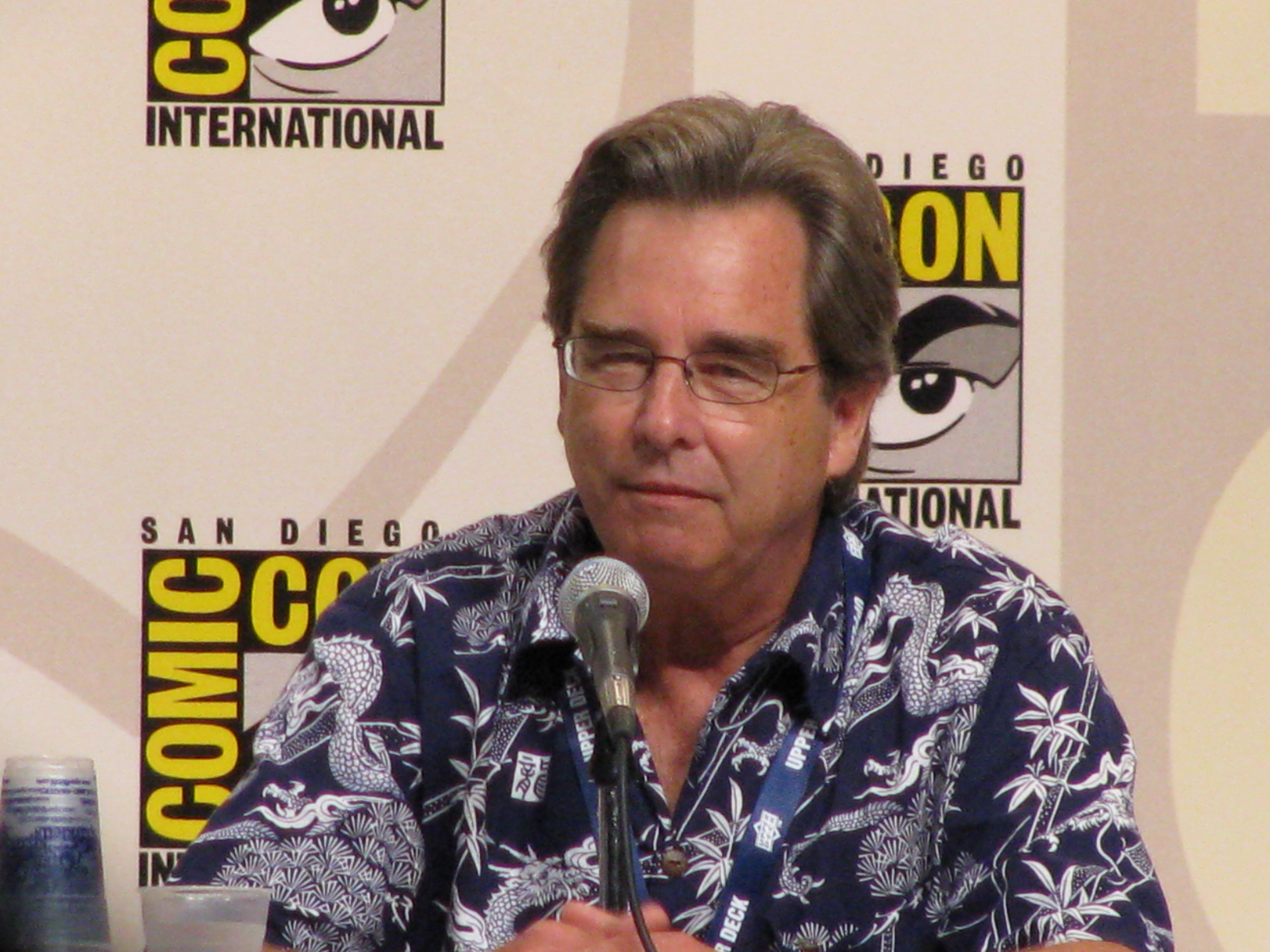
Beau Bridges made his second appearance as Agent Kramer.

On June 20, 2011, it was announced that Beau Bridges had been cast as Peter's mentor; his first appearance was in "Countdown", and he returned for "Pulling Strings". The next month, the casting of Tom Skerritt was announced; he was reported to play Alan Mitchell, the father of Elizabeth Burke. Bailey Chase's casting as Bryan McKenzie, a Sterling-Bosch vice president, was announced simultaneously. Debra Monk's appearance in the series was confirmed simultaneously with the announcement of the fourth season renewal; while it was not stated which episode she would appear in, it was revealed that she would appear in one of the season's last six episodes. With this announcement also came news that Diahann Carroll would return to the series in her recurring role as June. "Pulling Strings" was directed by Anton Cropper, his first directing credit for the series. The episode was written by Channing Powell; it was his fifth writing contribution. Powell has stated that Peter's reduced role in the episode was due to actor Tim DeKay's preparation for directing the next episode.

== Reception ==
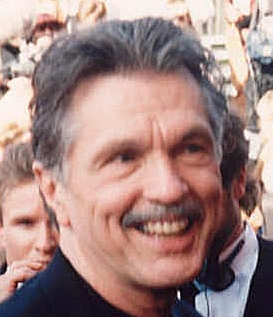
Tom Skerritt's performance as Alan Mitchell was particularly praised by critics.

=== Ratings ===
Upon its premiere, "Pulling Strings" drew 2.469 million viewers, which, at the time, was the lowest of the series. The episode drew 0.8 million viewers in the 18–49 demographic, which was down 0.3 and 0.2 million from the previous two episodes, "Upper West Side Story" and "Neighborhood Watch", respectively. The episode ranked 28th in the 18–49 demographic for the night, down seventeen places from the previous week.

=== Reviews ===
"Pulling Strings" received mostly mixed to positive reviews, with many critics praising Tom Skerritt's performance, but with many criticizing the use of Hilarie Burton's character. Kenny Herzog of The A.V. Club gave the episode a B+ rating, praising Channing Powell's writing in a mostly standalone episode. While he complimented Bomer and Garson's rapport and Garson's scenes at the Burke home, he stated that Burton's character "continues to feel just off." He went on to say that the episode is "once again an example of ... just how good they've gotten at making White Collar tick." Hilary Rothing of CraveOnline wrote that she enjoyed the performances of Bridges and Skerritt and that the Burkes' storyline was "fun" but "still schmaltzy." She also praised the episode's use of Burton's character. Rothing later complimented both the episodic case and Bridges's story arc; she ultimately gave the episode a rating of 8.5 out of 10. C. Charles of TV Fanatic called the episode "intriguing" and praised many aspects of "Pulling Strings", including Bridges and Burton's reintroductions and the use of Elizabeth's parents; Charles rated the episode 4.8 out of 5. Reviewer Gregg Wright gave the episode an 8 out of 10, elaborating that while the episode "could have easily been an average or sub-par procedural," it became above-average when all of the elements were combined. He also complimented Carroll's appearance and Bridges's performance as a strong antagonist.

Brittany Frederick of Starpulse.com gave the episode a more mediocre review, calling it "lackluster" and mentioning that she has "never felt Hilarie Burton's chemistry with Matt Bomer." She did, however, praise the heightened roles of Thomason and Atkins and the introduction of Elizabeth's parents.
