= Upper West Side Story =

- White Collar episode
- Episode no.: Season 3 Episode 12
- Directed by: Russell Lee Fine
- Written by: Alexandra McNally & Jim Campolongo
- Original air date: January 24, 2012

Guest appearances
- Dylan Baker as Andy Woods; Elizabeth Gillies as Chloe Woods; Graham Phillips as Evan Leary; Rosalyn Coleman; John Rothman as Graham Slater; Sharif Atkins as Clinton Jones

Episode chronology
← Previous "Checkmate"	Next → "Neighborhood Watch"

"Upper West Side Story" is the 12th episode of the third season of the American comedy-drama television series White Collar, and the 42nd episode overall. It was first broadcast on USA Network in the United States on January 24, 2012. The episode was directed by Russell Lee Fine and written by Alexandra McNally and Jim Campolongo.

The episode features several themes of Shakespeare's Romeo and Juliet, and contains various allusions to Shakespearean and Victorian-era literature. After a student (Graham Phillips) at a prestigious prep school approaches Peter Burke and Neal Caffrey about missing scholarship funds, they begin investigating the father (Dylan Baker) of the boy's crush (Elizabeth Gillies).

According to the Nielsen ratings system, an estimated 3.472 million household viewers watched the original broadcast of the episode, with 1.1 million in the 18–49 demographic. "Upper West Side Story" received positive reviews.

== Plot ==
Neal (Matt Bomer) and Peter (Tim DeKay) are approached by Evan Leary (Graham Phillips), a student at the prestigious Manhattan Preparatory Academy. Evan explains that he believes the money from his scholarship fund was embezzled by a rich investor by the name of Andy Woods (Dylan Baker). Peter quickly takes the case, realizing that Woods is already believed to be associated with a major cartel.

Peter visits the school under the guise of the parent of a potential student. Neal is to pose as his assistant, but he instead takes on the role of a substitute English teacher after learning that both Evan and Woods' 17-year-old daughter Chloe (Elizabeth Gillies), are in the class. Woods soon discovers that Peter may not be who he says he is after learning that he lied about his hotel arrangements; Peter covers for this by admitting that he spent the night with his mistress. Later, Neal tells Mozzie (Willie Garson) about Evan's silent attraction to Chloe, and that he plans to set them up using a sonnet.

Peter discovers that Woods may be working with Graham Slater (John Rothman), the school's headmaster, in order to embezzle the funds. The following day, at the school, Neal sees Slater drop an envelope into Chloe's locker. In order to check the contents of the envelope, Peter pulls the fire alarm. Neal finds the school's quarterly finance report inside.

Chloe later asks Neal to tutor her at home; he accepts and invites Evan to come as well. Woods invites Peter to dinner the same night, and asks that he bring his mistress along as well. Diana (Marsha Thomason), posing as Peter's mistress, accompanies Peter, and, while there, stages a quarrel. Peter, feigning frustration, opens a door to exit, setting off an alarm in the process. Woods turns the alarm off; this allows Neal to easily break into his office and clone Woods' hard drive. Chloe follows Neal into her father's office and accidentally pocket dials Woods. Realizing something is wrong, Woods goes downstairs to his office and discovers Neal with Chloe. Evan quickly enters, taking the blame for the mistake.

The next day, Evan lets Neal know that Woods suspects something. Peter is taken hostage by Woods and held in the shop classroom, where Woods quickly discovers that Peter is with the FBI. Neal takes Chloe's phone and calls Woods, forcing him to step out of the room. Neal and Mozzie create a smokescreen out of lab chemicals and free Peter; Diana meanwhile arrests Woods. Neal explains to Chloe that her life will not be easy, and she begins a relationship with Evan after discovering roses and the sonnet left by Neal and Mozzie.

Later, Peter must give a statement to the commutation committee about Neal's involvement with the Keller case. Although Neal's actions had caused the kidnapping of Elizabeth (Tiffani Thiessen), Peter opts to omit the details surrounding Neal's theft of the art.

== Production ==
I love that part of White Collar a lot because it's fun, it's light, there's a lot of heart in those episodes.

— Tim DeKay

The episode was written by Alexandra McNally and Jim Campolongo. It was McNally's fifth episode since joining the series during the second season, and Campolongo's sixth overall. It was their first time to collaborate on an episode. "Upper West Side Story" was directed by Russell Lee Fine, his third directing credit for the series after the episodes "Payback" and "On Guard". Working titles for the episode included "Well Endowed" and "Hangin' with Mr. Cooper". It was first reported on July 11, 2011 that Dylan Baker and Elizabeth Gillies would appear in an episode of White Collar as Andy Woods and his daughter. Other guest stars to appear in the episode include Graham Phillips.

Series star Tim DeKay stated that he enjoyed working on the episode, in part because it was primarily a standalone. Bomer said, speaking of "Upper West Side Story", that he enjoys portraying different aspects of Neal's undercover roles. Bomer stated that he received a phone call from Campolongo requesting that he memorize a Byron poem by the next morning. The poem was ultimately included in a scene in which Neal is teaching an English class. Kenny Herzog of The A.V. Club pointed out that the episode contained various references to Shakespearian and Victorian-era literature, specifically mentioning Romeo and Juliet. He stated that these metaphors helped move the plot forward.

== Reception ==
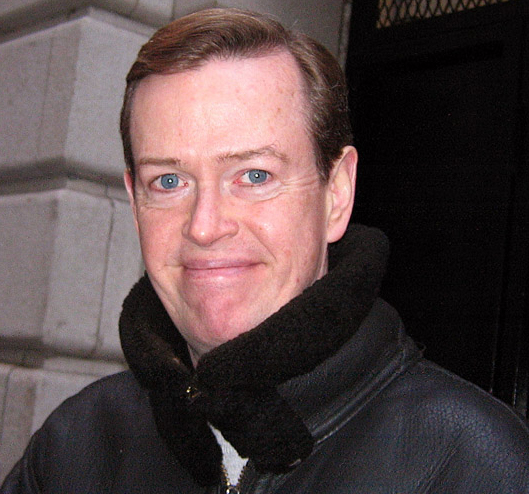
Dylan Baker's performance as Andy Woods was met with mixed reactions from critics.

=== Ratings ===
The initial broadcast of the episode drew 3.472 million viewers, and earned a 1.1 rating in the 18–49 demographic. "Upper West Side Story" ranked seventh place among cable series for the night in the 18–49 demographic and fourth in its time slot, surpassed by Teen Mom 2, Storage Wars, and The Game. The original broadcast of the episode overlapped with the 2012 State of the Union Address for the first 17 minutes; however, viewership for the episode increased slightly from the previous week.

=== Reviews ===
"Upper West Side Story" received mostly positive reviews from critics, with many praising the mostly standalone format and the rebuilding of Neal and Peter's relationship. Morgan Glennon of The Huffington Post called the episode "a really fun undercover romp that still deals with the fallout between Neal and Peter." Michelle Carlbert stated that she "felt like it put Neal and Peter back on track" and that she enjoyed the standalone case. Brittany Frederick of Starpulse.com said that "this is an episode that reminds me why I fell in love with White Collar." Frederick compared the episode to "Mr. Monk Goes Back to School", an episode of USA Network's Monk; she likened Baker's character to that of Andrew McCarthy's in Monk, stating that as a villain, McCarthy was evil yet endearing, while Baker appeared genuinely evil. She also praised the series for utilizing comedy rather than drama. Kenny Herzog of The A.V. Club gave the episode a more mixed review, stating that while the series was "at its caper-hatching best," it was "also its most excessively ludicrous." Like Frederick, Herzog praised the use of comedy, though he felt that Baker appeared to be more like "a cartoon bully." He ultimately gave the episode a B−.
