= Dinner at Tiffani's =

American celebrity food show

- Genre: Cooking
- Starring: Tiffani Thiessen
- Country of origin: United States
- Original language: English
- No. of seasons: 3
- No. of episodes: 39

Production
- Executive producers: Christian Horner; Adam Rosenblatt; Jamie Rosenblatt; Tiffani Thiessen
- Camera setup: Multiple
- Running time: 30 minutes
- Production company: H2R Productions

Original release
- Network: Cooking Channel
- Release: February 25, 2015 – March 12, 2017

Dinner at Tiffani's is an American food-based television series on the Cooking Channel that premiered on February 25, 2015. The show follows host Tiffani Thiessen preparing dinner with a different group of celebrity friends each episode and the title is a play on Truman Capote's 1958 novel Breakfast at Tiffany's.

The ten-episode first season was developed following a one-hour special under the same title, which aired on March 23, 2014. The pilot episode was available to stream free from February 9, 2015, more than two weeks before the television series premiere. The program was renewed for a 16-episode second season which began broadcast in 2016. The third and final season aired starting in January 2017.

== Season 1 (2015) ==
No.	Title	Original release date	U.S. viewers (thousands)
0	"Dinner at Tiffani's (pilot)"	March 23, 2014	N/A
Meal: Balsalmic glazed Brussels sprout with pancetta; blackberry cocktails Guests: Nathan Fillion, Willie Garson, Lindsay Price
1	"Game Night Munchies"	February 25, 2015	82,000
Meal: Roasted dates stuffed with goat cheese and smoked bacon; pizza topped with mushroom, leeks, and prosciutto; tuna poke; peanut butter chocolate bites; Meyer lemon whiskey sour cocktail Guests: Ross Mathews, Jillian Barberie, Tim Meadows
2	"Girls Night In"	March 4, 2015	N/A
Meal: Grilled ciabatta with ricotta and snap peas; chicken with orange glaze; orzo salad with corn, arugula, and cherry tomatoes; roasted asparagus; watermelon and champagne cocktail Guests: Elizabeth Berkley, Emily Procter
3	"Big Ol' Texas Feast"	March 11, 2015	129,000
Meal: Tequila-peach tea; pimento cheese spread; BBQ ribs, Southern greens with bacon and spicy vinaigrette; pecan pie with homemade vanilla bean whipped cream Guests: Sharif Atkins, Tim DeKay, Willie Garson
4	"Bubbly Brunch"	March 18, 2015	117,000
Meal: Bacon coated in a maple-fennel glaze; frittatas made with goat cheese and red peppers; Caprese salad; cranberry-prosecco fizz Guests: Bree Turner, Lance Bass, Michael Turchin
5	"Wedding Night Favorites"	March 25, 2015	144,000
Meal: Arugula salad topped with Parmesan cheese; Marcona almonds and truffle oil steaks in a garlic-and-shallot sauce Guests: Brady Smith, Jason Priestley, Naomi Lowde-Priestley
6	"Pizza Party"	April 1, 2015	N/A
Meal: Potato, goat cheese and caramelized onion pizza; ricotta, arugula, lemon, and grape pizza; fig, prosciutto, blue cheese pizza Guests: Seth Green, Clare Grant
7	"Come In for Comfort Food"	April 8, 2015	N/A
Meal: Grilled cheese with caramelized onions; roasted tomato soup; popcorn coated in peanut butter, caramel, and chocolate; rosemary greyhound Guests: Bill Bellamy, Mario Lopez, Courtney Lopez
8	"All in the Family"	April 15, 2015	N/A
Meal: Watermelon salad with fresh mint and feta; pickle-and-potato salad; fried chicken; root beer floats with homemade vanilla ice cream Guests: Tim DeKay, Elisa DeKay, Jamis DeKay, Danna DeKay
9	"Going Old School"	April 22, 2015	N/A
Meal: Braised tri-tip roast; Parmesan peas; honey-season carrots; cream cheese pie Guests: Ashley Williams, Matthew Lillard
10	"That Girl Grills"	April 29, 2015	137,000
Meal: Trout stuffed with lemon and herbs; corn with spicy mayo; gazpacho made with cucumber, watermelon, and mint Guests: Jonathan Silverman, Jennifer Finnigan

== Season 2 (2016) ==
No. overall	No. in season	Title	Original release date	U.S. viewers (thousands)
11	1	"Burgers and Beer"	February 3, 2016	N/A
Meal: Burger with blue cheese and bacon; crispy beer-battered French fries; wedge salad Guests: Brady Smith, Matthew Lillard, Eric Close
12	2	"Movie Night"	February 10, 2016	N/A
Meal: Roasted chicken pot pie; sour cream mashed potatoes; sweet and spicy popcorn; spiked hot chocolate Guests: Tim Meadows, Neal Dodson, Ashley Williams
13	3	"Farmers' Market Finds"	February 17, 2016	N/A
Meal: Creamy caramelized winter squash ricotta; grilled leeks with homemade tarragon vinaigrette; blood orange vanilla cocktails; cinnamon-sugar baked pears with rich mascarpone and dried currants Guests: Ross Mathews, Daisy Fuentes
14	4	"High Tea with a Twist"	February 24, 2016	N/A
Meal: Cherry green tea cocktail; blueberry-lemon scones topped with honey butter and blackberry jam; earthy roasted beet salad; truffled egg salad tea sandwiches; curried chicken salad tea sandwiches; goat cheese with pecans tea sandwiches Guests: Vanessa Lachey, Bree Turner
15	5	"Fiesta Night"	March 2, 2016	N/A
Tropical salsa; prickly pear margaritas; citrus-marinated beef fajitas; slow cooked Cuban-style black beans; Mexican rice Guests: Scott Wolf, Hilarie Burton, Ethan Embry
16	6	"Ladies Who Lunch"	March 9, 2016	N/A
Meal: Chopped salad; homemade breadsticks; jumbo crab cakes with tartar sauce; basil-limoncello sorbet Guests: Julie Benz, Sasha Alexander
17	7	"Brady's Birthday Bash"	March 16, 2016	N/A
Brisket; corn salad with jícama and lime; baked beans; naked carrot cake Guest: Brady Smith
18	8	"Rewind and Redo"	March 23, 2016	N/A
Homemade ginger beer; Dark 'n' Stormy cocktail; beef-and-mushroom stroganoff; creamy polenta Guest: Ross Mathews
19	9	"Potluck Party"	March 30, 2016	N/A
Meal: Roasted vegetable and sausage lasagna; orange-chipotle shrimp; salted caramel brownies Guests: Dan Bucatinsky, George Newbern, Ashley Williams
20	10	"Day at the Fair"	April 6, 2016	N/A
Meal: Corn dog and hamburger sliders on pretzel buns Guests: Seth Green, Clare Grant
21	11	"Big Game"	April 13, 2016	N/A
Meal: Pulled pork sandwiches; Brussels sprout slaw; Summer Shandy; baked ginger wings; loaded baby baked potatoes Guests: Bill Bellamy, Nicole Sullivan
22	12	"Family Favorites with Friends"	April 17, 2016	N/A
Meal: Spaghetti and meatballs; warm spinach salad with sautéed mushrooms and crispy pancetta; six-layer cake with creamy, chocolate icing Guests: Ross Mathews, Drew Scott, Jonathan Scott
23	13	"Southern Style"	April 20, 2016	N/A
Meal: Boiled peanuts; chicken and dumplings; fried okra; banana pudding with rum sauce Guests: Scout Masterson, Bill Horn, Cheri Oteri
24	14	"Retro Diner"	April 27, 2016	N/A
Meal: Pickled turnips; patty melts; disco fries with gravy and cheese sauce; boozy chocolate hazelnut milkshake Guests: Dave Foley, Naomi Lowde-Priestley
25	15	"Campfire Cookout"	May 4, 2016	N/A
Meal: Spicy four-bean chili, buttery skillet cornbread; hot toddies; s'mores bar with homemade marshmallows Guests: Cynthia Watros, Jennifer Finnigan, Missi Pyle
26	16	"Lobster for Four"	May 11, 2016	N/A
Meal: Blueberry mojitos; lobster boil; grilled artichokes with sweet chili sauce; triple-layered tri-berry trifle Brady Smith, Mark-Paul Gosselaar, Catriona Gosselaar
0	Special	"Christmas at Tiffani's"	December 4, 2016	N/A
Meal: smoked turkey with crispy skin and fennel and sun-dried tomato dressing; cheesy potatoes au gratin; boozy blood orange cranberry sauce; gruyere and thyme rolls; bourbon pecan pie with homemade vanilla whipped cream Guests: Brady Smith, Mark-Paul Gosselaar, Catriona Gosselaar, Tim DeKay, Elisa DeKay, Jason Priestley, Naomi Lowde-Priestley

== Season 3 (2017) ==
No. overall	No. in season	Title	Original release date	U.S. viewers (thousands)
27	1	"A Rustic Luncheon"	January 8, 2017	N/A
Meal: Honey garlic salmon smoked on the grill; grilled vegetable couscous salad; blackberry mint mule; cardamom nectarine galette Guests: Matt Bomer, Tim DeKay
28	2	"A Mediterranean Feast"	January 15, 2017	N/A
Meal: Tzatziki and hummus; spiced pita chips; char-grilled chicken kebabs; lemon-flavored rice Guests: Brady Smith, Ethan Embry, Sunny Mabrey
29	3	"Breakfast for Dinner"	January 22, 2017	N/A
Meal: Savory potato pancakes; sausage and coat cheese egg casserole; spicy Bloody Mary with maple bacon; yogurt blini bar with sweet fixings Guests: Bree Turner, Marla Sokoloff
30	4	"Tasty Childhood Favorites"	January 29, 2017	N/A
Meal: Turkey meatloaf; garlic mashed potatoes; crispy fried shallots; creamed spinach tartlets; grapefruit chiffon pie Guests: French Stewart, Nicole Sullivan, Nate Berkus
31	5	"Tiffani's French Cafe"	February 5, 2017	N/A
Meal: Croque monsieur-inspired grilled cheese; crispy frites with homemaid aioli; butter lettuce salad with mustard vinaigrette; chocolate mousse with hazelnut whipped cream Guests: Ross Mathews, Sara Rue
32	6	"Silver Fork, Paper Plate"	February 12, 2017	N/A
Meal: Mom's Bar-B-Q, Girasol Restaurant, SusieCakes; Guests: Brady Smith, Ethan Embry, Ashley Williams
33	7	"Asian Inspiration"	February 19, 2017	N/A
Meal: Spring rolls with spicy peanut sauce and nước chấm; Peking duck, cauliflower fried rice Guests: Brady Smith, Marguerite Moreau, Christopher Redman
34	8	"Tiffani's Mardi Gras Celebration"	February 26, 2017	N/A
Meal: Hot crab and kale dip with Creole crostini; gumbo; Sazerac cocktail; cheesy grits with blackened butter Guests: Bill Bellamy, Kristen Bellamy, Eric Close
35	9	"A Backyard Barbecue"	March 5, 2017	N/A
Meal: Barbecue chicken with peach barbecue sauce; spicy jalapeño corn muffins; baked mac and cheese with ricotta; peach hard lemonade Guests: Tim Meadows, Missi Pyle
36	10	"Tiffani's Greatest Hits"	March 12, 2017	N/A
Meals: Blackberry mint mules; roasted dates stuffed with bacon and goat cheese; steak filets; pulled pork sliders; tri-berry trifle Guests: Ross Mathews, Matt Bomer, Tim DeKay, Jason Priestley, Naomi Lowde-Priestley, Bill Bellamy, Nicole Sullivan, Mark-Paul Gosselaar, Catriona Gosselaar
