= List of White Collar characters =

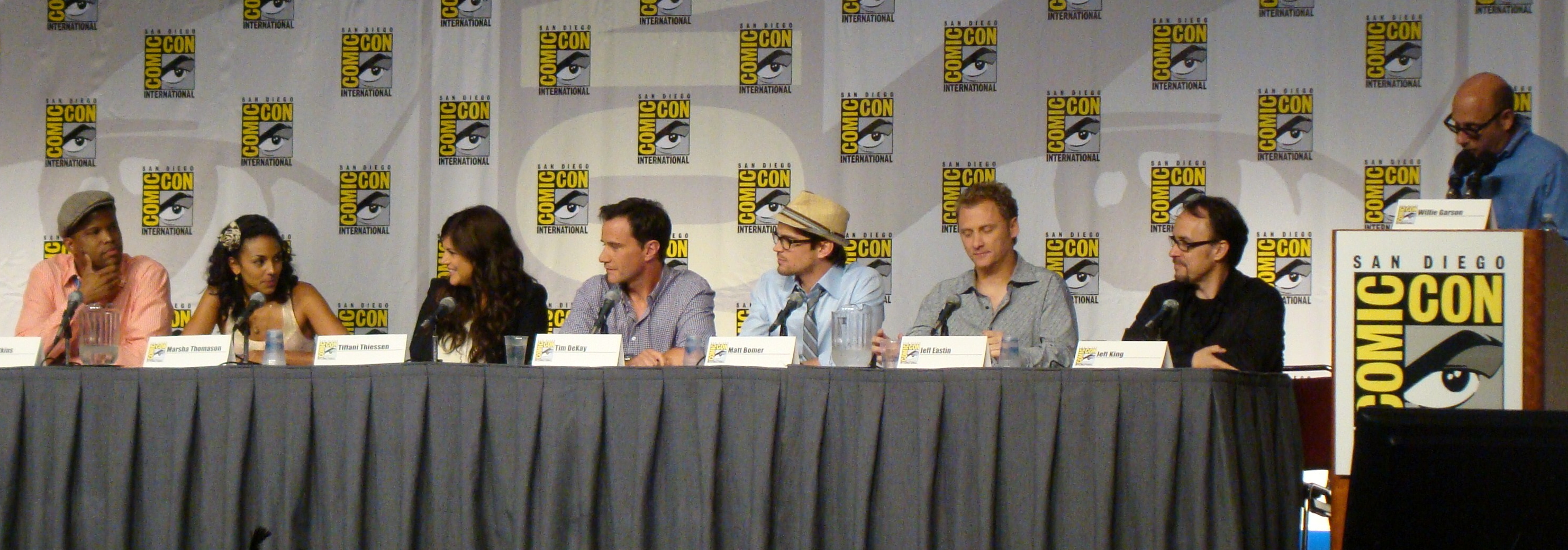
The cast of White Collar. Left to right: Sharif Atkins, Marsha Thomason, Tiffani Thiessen, Tim DeKay, Matt Bomer, Creator Jeff Eastin, Producer Jeff King, and Willie Garson

This is a list of characters in the USA Network original comedy-drama TV series White Collar. The principal cast of the series has remained mostly the same throughout the series. However, various recurring characters have appeared over the course of the show's run.

== Main characters ==
Name	Portrayed by	Occupation/Status	Seasons					
Name	Portrayed by	Occupation/Status	1	2	3	4	5	6
Neal Caffrey	Matt Bomer	Conman; consultant to the FBI white collar crime unit	Main					
Special Agent in Charge Peter Burke	Tim DeKay	Senior FBI agent, white collar crime unit	Main					
Mozzie	Willie Garson	Conman; Neal's best friend	Main					
Elizabeth Burke	Tiffani Thiessen	Peter's wife; event planner	Main					
Special Agent Lauren Cruz	Natalie Morales	FBI agent, white collar crime unit	Main	—N/a				
Special Agent Diana Berrigan	Marsha Thomason	FBI agent, white collar crime unit	Recurring^{1}	Main				
Special Agent Clinton Jones	Sharif Atkins	FBI agent, white collar crime unit	Recurring			Main		
Sara Ellis	Hilarie Burton	Insurance company investigator	—N/a	Recurring	Main	Recurring	—N/a	

- ^Note 1: Thomason was credited in the main cast in the pilot, but did not appear again until the first-season finale, in which she was a guest star.

=== Neal Caffrey ===
Neal Caffrey (Matt Bomer) is a former conman who, after being caught escaping from prison, begins to work for the FBI's white collar crime unit under the supervision of Special Agent Peter Burke. Throughout the series, Neal helps the FBI solve difficult cases, using his vast knowledge of white collar crime. He is a skilled thief and art forger, among other criminal activities.

In the first episode, Neal is finishing a four-year prison sentence. His girlfriend, Kate, visits him in prison to break up with him. In order to get her back, he stages an elaborate prison break. Peter Burke, the agent who put Neal in prison to begin with, quickly catches up with Neal, where it is revealed that Kate has left only a bottle of Bordeaux behind at their apartment. Neal is quickly brought back to prison, where he is told he will have to serve four more years. After helping Peter and his team find an elusive criminal, the Dutchman (Mark Sheppard), Neal is released on the condition that he wear an ankle monitor that records his movements. He finds lodging with an elderly woman, June, and the two quickly become close.

Over the second season, Neal reveals much about his past. In "Forging Bonds" (2.11), he tells Peter that his first con with Mozzie involved a man named Vincent Adler. Adler introduced Neal to Kate, and the two quickly began a relationship. Months later, Neal and Kate discovered that Adler had been caught running a Ponzi scheme, and they lost all of their money. After Kate realized that Neal was conning her as well, she left him and began running her own cons. After reuniting and the two confessing their love, Neal was arrested (for the first time) by Peter.

=== Peter Burke ===
Special Agent Peter Burke (Tim DeKay) is an FBI agent, and the head of the Manhattan White Collar Division. He is married to Elizabeth and is the direct superior of Neal, Diana, and Jones. He has a dog named Satchmo.

Peter Burke is portrayed as a principled FBI agent with strong dedication to both his professional duties and his marriage. His partnership with Neal Caffrey occasionally requires him to adopt undercover personas and engage in situations that conflict with his otherwise strict adherence to ethical standards.

The pilot episode establishes that Peter pursued the Neal Caffrey case for several years before successfully apprehending him. Following Neal's prison escape after nearly four years of incarceration, Peter recaptured him and subsequently became his handler. Throughout the first season, their partnership develops as they investigate white collar crimes whilst Peter attempts to dissuade Neal from pursuing information about Kate Moreau's disappearance.

Season 2 reveals Peter's background includes growing up in Upstate New York as the son of a construction worker. He attended Harvard University on scholarship, earning an A.B. in mathematics before completing two years of accounting training.

During the third season Peter acknowledges his Eagle Scout rank. Peter also informs Neal that after college he was drafted by the Minnesota Twins as a pitcher, but quit after a serious injury occurred during his second week there. In another third-season episode, it is revealed that Peter has an astronomy hobby which was put to good use to solve a case involving an astronomical puzzle involving a kidnapper using an inheritance as a ransom.

In Season six, Elizabeth becomes pregnant and in the series finale has their son, whom they name Neal.

=== Mozzie ===
Mozzie (Willie Garson) is a close friend to Neal, and a fellow conman. He is characterized by his quirky qualities and generally mysterious nature. Mozzie uses his connections to the criminal world to help Neal. He is very distrusting of the FBI and "the system". After their first encounter, Peter refers to Mozzie as "Neal's friend", and Mozzie refers to Peter and Elizabeth as "Suit" and "Mrs. Suit". He goes on to form a very close friendship with Elizabeth.

Mozzie first met Neal while they were independent conmen, as shown through flashbacks in "Forging Bonds" (2.11). The two set up a long con on a man named Vincent Adler, though the plan eventually failed.

In the third season, it is revealed that Mozzie was abandoned on the doorstep of an orphanage with a stuffed bear named Mozart. Unable to pronounce the name "Mozart", he used to call the Bear "Mozzie". He kept the bear with him even after he ran to New York to escape the Detroit Mob, and he named himself after it.

In "Out of the Frying Pan" (5.2), it is revealed that Mozzie's real name is Theodore (Teddy) Winters.

=== Lauren Cruz ===
Special Agent Lauren Cruz (Natalie Morales) is an FBI agent who briefly worked in the white collar crime unit under Peter. She transferred to his team in "Threads" (1.02) and left after the events of "Out of the Box" (1.14). Morales left the show before production of the second season.

Lauren joined Burke's team early in the first season, transferring from the organized crime division. She is fascinated by Neal, having written her thesis about him while at Quantico. She assists with Neal and Peter's cases throughout the season, until being abruptly written out of the show between the first and second seasons.

=== Diana Berrigan ===
Special Agent Diana Berrigan (Marsha Thomason) is an FBI agent in the white collar crime unit, working under Peter. She first appeared in the pilot episode and was promoted to a main character beginning in "Withdrawal" (2.01).

Diana is one of the few people that Peter trusts implicitly, which contributes to her return to his team at the beginning of season two. She is the daughter of a diplomat, and spent much of her childhood in and out of hotel rooms. Her bodyguard, who greatly influenced her life (and through Diana, Neal's), was killed while protecting her. Diana is in a relationship with a woman named Christie, though it is strained because of Christie's reluctance to live in New York. Christie first appears in the third-season episode "Deadline" played by Moran Atias.

Diana was absent for much of the first season, as she transferred to the Washington, D.C. office for a desk job at the end of the pilot. However, she returns to New York in "Out of the Box" (1.14) to help Peter investigate Garrett Fowler, and eventually rejoins Peter's team.

In the second season, after the disappearance of the music box, it is shown to be in Diana's possession. Later, with the help of Alex Hunter, Neal steals it.

In the season three episode "Pulling Strings" Diana announces that the couple is engaged to be married. Diana is apprehensive, since the possibility of getting legally married is something she never thought could happen.

Diana reports that Christie and she have broken up in the season four episode "Honor Among Thieves", and reveals that she is pregnant, via sperm donor, in the season five premiere, reflecting Marsha Thomason's real-life pregnancy.

=== Clinton Jones ===
Special Agent Clinton Jones (Sharif Atkins) is an FBI agent in the white collar crime division, working under Peter. He first appeared in the pilot episode and has appeared in every episode since. Atkins was added to the starring cast in the fourth season.

Jones attended Harvard Law School and later joined the FBI. While at Harvard he was engaged to a woman named Isabella, but she left Jones for his best friend Jimmy (shown in season 3 episode 8), whom she later married with Jones present at their wedding. Peter uses him often when researching a lead or when he is in need of backup. Jones often is forced to "babysit" Neal or do surveillance duty in the FBI van, which he does not enjoy. It is revealed in the episode "As You Were" (3.08) that Jones is trained in Kali, is a U.S. Naval Academy graduate and chose a career in the FBI after his military commitment.

=== Sara Ellis ===
Sara Ellis (Hilarie Burton) is an insurance investigator for Sterling-Bosch who has a history with Neal. Sara is a sharp, skilled investigator, and initially mistrustful of Neal. Over time, she becomes an increasingly important part of Peter's extended team, as she is slowly drawn into a romantic relationship with Neal until she finds out that Neal and Mozzie have been hiding the missing stolen art treasures from a World War II German U-boat pursued by Neal's nemesis, Matthew Keller. She eventually forgives Neal when they are forced to work together, and they resume their relationship at the end of the third season.

In 3.14 it is revealed that Sara was engaged to her boss, whom she is investigating in the same episode, Brian McKenzie, but broke off the engagement when he wanted to extend Sterling-Bosch beyond insurance. Sara revealed that her older sister ran away when she was little (though in Season 2, Episode 5, she said she was an only child). She gave a statement in Neal's favor when agent Kramer pursued him. However, when Neal left without telling her goodbye, she was hurt, as stated in 4.04, feeling as if she had lost a family member all over again. They later resume their relationship until Sara gets a job offer in London.

=== Elizabeth Burke ===
Elizabeth Burke (Tiffani Thiessen) is an event planner, and is married to Peter. It is shown in first season that Peter followed her and did background checks in order to ask Elizabeth out (although unromantic, this mirrors real-life guidelines of the personal lives of law enforcement and intelligence agents). Elizabeth is a periodic "consultant" to the FBI and has assisted on various cases, using her professional activities as a convincing cover. She is even seen teaching Peter how to flirt with other women when he is going undercover, and on occasion demonstrates a cooler head in a crisis than her husband or Neal. She is kidnapped by Matthew Keller at the end of episode "Countdown" (3.10), but later escapes.

Elizabeth is a sisterly figure to Neal and has a special friendship with Mozzie, while he calls her "Mrs. Suit".

== Recurring characters ==
=== Rebecca Lowe/Rachel Turner ===
Rebecca Lowe (Bridget Regan), whose true identity is Rachel Turner, serves as Neal's romantic interest during season five. Initially presented as a museum employee, she becomes involved in Neal's schemes after being dismissed from her position. Their relationship develops following Neal's disclosure of his FBI consultancy role.

The character is revealed to be a former MI5 agent who conducted extensive surveillance on the White Collar unit and orchestrated multiple murders, including those of Hagan and David Siegel. In the season six premiere, she assists in locating Neal during his kidnapping before being taken into custody. Whilst being transported by US Marshals, she deliberately provokes a fatal confrontation by reaching for a weapon.

=== June Ellington ===
June Ellington (Diahann Carroll) is a widow who allows Neal to stay in her home. Her husband, Byron, was a conman as well. June has two granddaughters: Cindy and Samantha. June first met Neal while in a thrift store when she offered him a room in her luxurious home where he stays throughout the series. She becomes both a trusted friend and occasionally a part of cases, both asking for and offering help (appearing in 27 episodes). She displays her singing talents in "Home Invasion" and contributes to a case in "Empire City" by starring as the opening act at a jazz club under investigation.

=== Kate Moreau ===
Kate Moreau (Alexandra Daddario) was Neal's girlfriend. Her disappearance and murder were the primary story arc throughout the first and second seasons. Kate first met Neal while working for Vincent Adler. She began a relationship with Neal, who she believed was Nick Halden. Kate is killed in a plane explosion at the end of seasons, leaving Neal depressed and angry, motivating his actions in and the plot of subsequent seasons. It is later revealed that Vincent Adler was responsible for Kate's murder.

=== Matthew Keller ===
Matthew Keller (Ross McCall) is Neal's blue-collar counterpart and nemesis. Unlike Neal, he is willing to murder to make a score. At the end of "Countdown" he kidnaps Elizabeth to force Peter to help him steal the submarine treasure from Neal. In "Checkmate" Keller says that Elizabeth will be returned to Peter if he, Neal, and Mozzie help him steal the treasure. During this episode, it is revealed that Neal and Keller used to be close friends. In Season Six, it is revealed that Keller made a deal with Interpol; freedom in exchange for bringing down the gang of thieves known as the "Pink Panthers." At the end, Keller goes back on his deal and is killed by Peter.

=== Reese Hughes ===
Special Agent in Charge Reese Hughes (James Rebhorn) is an experienced agent in the FBI's white collar crime unit, and is Peter and Neal's direct superior. Hughes is supportive of Peter's use of Neal, but is at first skeptical of the former conman, believing that he will eventually return to his criminal ways. However, as time passes, he begins to see Neal's value.

=== Garrett Fowler ===
Former Special Agent Garrett Fowler (Noah Emmerich) is a disgraced agent from the Office of Professional Responsibility. He was once suspected to be the man behind Kate's death. Fowler headed Operation Mentor, which focused on taking down Peter Burke. It was also used to search for the music box.

It is also known that Fowler once had a wife who was later murdered; from this Fowler wanted revenge and subsequently went on to kill his late wife's killer. This was covered up by someone who is able to pull a lot of strings and he was transferred to OPR.

=== Alex Hunter ===
Alexandra Hunter (Gloria Votsis) is characterised as a skilled fence with connections to influential figures. FBI records indicate a single arrest in France. Her professional expertise and ability to operate internationally feature prominently throughout her appearances.

Alex's history with Neal originates during his employment with Vincent Adler, when their initial professional antagonism evolved into a romantic relationship. She possesses specialised knowledge regarding valuable artifacts, particularly a music box sought by Adler.

Her recurring role involves collaboration with Neal on various schemes, often necessitating her departure from the United States due to security concerns. The FBI facilitates her travel to Italy on multiple occasions. Her professional activities include fencing operations and artifact recovery, whilst maintaining a cautious approach to avoid detection by hostile parties.

The character demonstrates technical proficiency in infiltration and maintains romantic tension with Neal across multiple seasons. Her appearances include a kidnapping incident orchestrated by Vincent Adler and a subsequent imprisonment in Athens lasting sixteen months.

=== Vincent Adler ===
Vincent Adler (Andrew McCarthy) was the CEO of a massive hedge fund, believed to be the driving power behind Kate's murder. Neal tells Peter that he first learned of Adler from Mozzie when Neal and Mozzie planned a long-con: to infiltrate Adler's organization and take him down. Peter and Neal later realize that Adler is "the man pulling the strings". He is the person responsible for Kate's death. Adler is eventually killed by Peter Burke in order to save Neal's life.

== Minor characters ==
- Cindy (Denise Vasi) is June's granddaughter. She first appeared in the pilot episode and returned with the third season premiere, "On Guard" (3.01).
- Christie (Moran Atias) is Diana's girlfriend. She is a physician who works at a hospital. She first appeared in the episode "Deadline" (3.03). In the third season episode "Pulling Strings" (3.14), Christie proposed to Diana. Diana reports the couple's breakup in the season four episode "Honor Among Thieves".
- Senator Terrence Pratt (Titus Welliver) is the main antagonist in season 4.
- Amanda Callaway (Emily Procter) is the new Special Agent in Charge of the White Collar Division in the two last episodes of season 4.
- David Siegel (Warren Kole) is Neal's new handler in season 5, when Peter has a new assignment as the leader of the White Collar Division. He first appeared in "Out of the Frying Pan" (5.02) and he is killed in the next episode "One Last Stakeout" (5.03) by Rebecca Lowe.
- Curtis Hagan/The Dutchman (Mark Sheppard) is a con artist, art restorer and a skilled forger. He was the subject of the investigation in the pilot episode and is the main antagonist in the first half of season 5.
