= Tim DeKay =

American actor (born 1963)

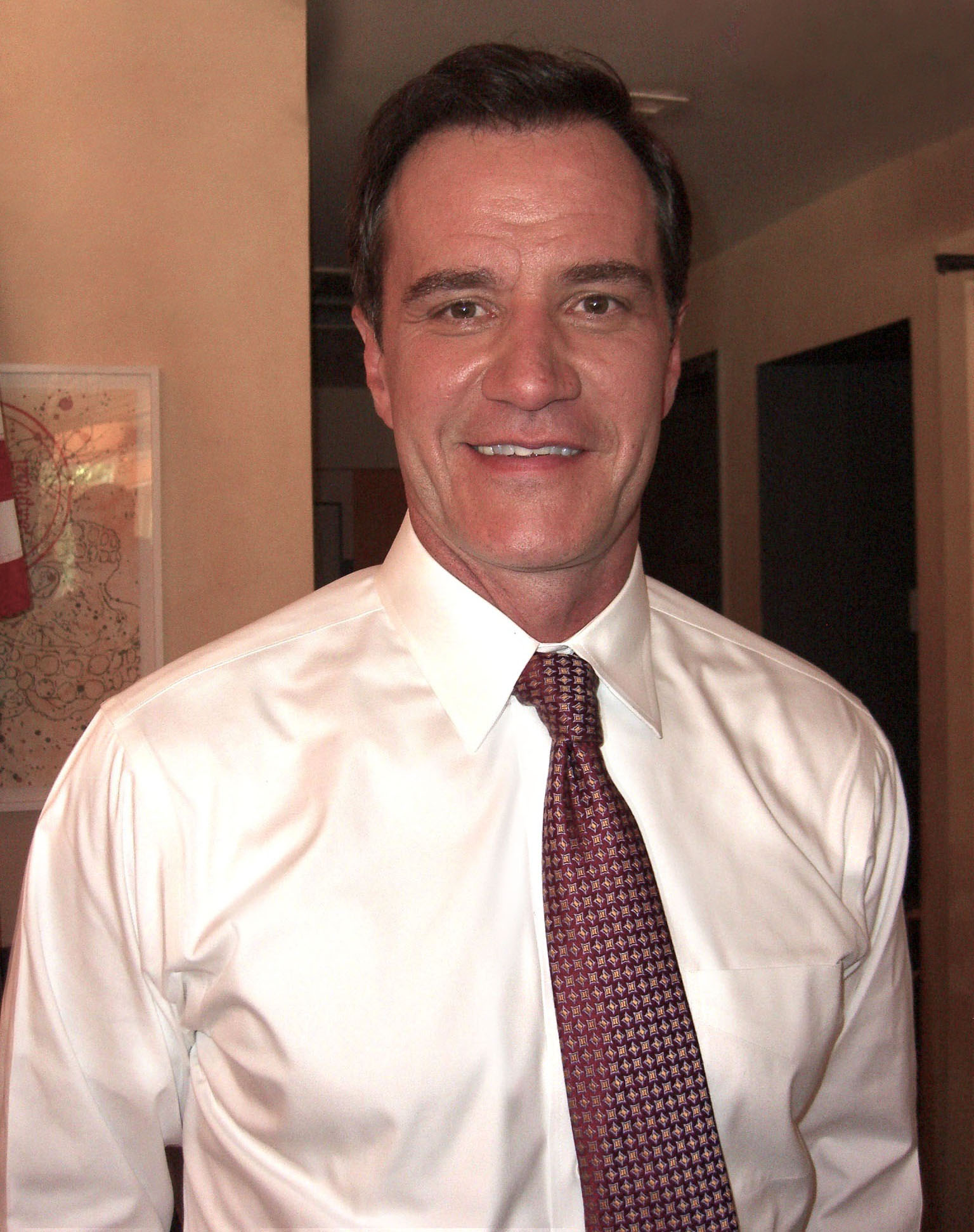
- DeKay in June 2011
- Born: Timothy Robert DeKay; June 12, 1963 (age 63); Lansing, New York, U.S.
- Education: Le Moyne College (BS); Rutgers University, New Brunswick (MFA)
- Occupation: Actor
- Years active: 1995–present
- Spouse: Elisa Taylor (m. 1991)
- Children: 2

Timothy Robert DeKay (born June 12, 1963) is an American actor. He starred in the USA Network series White Collar (2009–2014).

== Early life ==
Tim DeKay was born Timothy Robert DeKay June 12, 1963, to Jim DeKay and Jill Vaughn in Lansing, New York, where he and his brother Jamey grew up. He attended Lansing High School. Growing up, DeKay enjoyed athletics, having played both varsity basketball and baseball, the latter of which is a generational tradition in his family. He enjoyed the arts and performed in his high school's production of Oliver!. DeKay attended Le Moyne College to study business and philosophy, where he also played baseball, eventually deciding to pursue a career in theater.

DeKay planned for a career in business or law and graduated with a bachelor's degree in business administration in 1985. However, he realized that he wanted to work in theater instead. After taking a few courses in directing at Syracuse University, DeKay attended Rutgers University, where he received a Master of Fine Arts degree and met his wife, actress Elisa Taylor.

== Career ==
DeKay has performed in plays both on Broadway and off, including Ridiculous Fraud at the McCarter Theatre, Billy Budd at the Circle in the Square Theatre, Someone to Watch Over Me with the Denver Theatre Company, The Merchant of Venice on the Hartford Stage, and the national tour of The Lion in Winter. In 2009, he was both director and producer of the short film This Monday. It was included in several short film festivals, including Cannes Short Film Corner and the Palm Springs International Festival of Short Films.

His first onscreen acting job was as corporation head Larry Deon on seaQuest 2032. DeKay was a cast member of Party of Five from 1997 to 1999, Carnivàle from 2003 to 2005, and Tell Me You Love Me in 2007. He co-starred as Dean Stewart in the gay-themed comedy/drama film Big Eden in 2000. DeKay appeared in two episodes of Seinfeld: "The Soul Mate" and "The Bizarro Jerry", as Elaine's boyfriend, Kevin, who is seen as Jerry's exact opposite (and thus compared to Bizarro Superman from "the backwards bizarro world"). He would work with Julia Louis-Dreyfus again in The New Adventures of Old Christine, playing a temperamental boyfriend of Louis-Dreyfus's character in a three-episode story arc. DeKay has guest-starred on several other TV series, including Friends, CSI, My Name Is Earl, NCIS, Scrubs, and Chuck.

In 2009, he began starring in the USA Network comedy–drama White Collar as FBI agent Peter Burke. DeKay made his directorial debut in the episode "Stealing Home", which premiered in 2012. He played Duvall Pritchard in Fox Television's 2016 sci-fi drama series Second Chance.

DeKay is a member of the Actors Studio. He taught as an adjunct professor at the University of Southern California.

In June 2024, during Variety's TV Fest, DeKay confirmed his return as FBI Special Agent Peter Burke in the upcoming revival, "White Collar Renaissance". He praised the new script, stating "it answers all the questions that one would have if you watched the show" and serves as an introduction for new viewers. DeKay also emphasized that the revival pays tribute to Willie Garson, who portrayed Mozzie in the original series.

== Personal life ==
DeKay and his wife, actress Elisa Taylor, reside in Los Angeles, California. They have a daughter, Danna, and a son, Jamis.

In May 2010, he returned to Le Moyne College as the commencement speaker and was awarded the degree of Doctor of Humane Letters honoris causa.

== Filmography ==
=== Film ===
| Year | Title | Role | Notes |
|---|---|---|---|
| 1996 | If These Walls Could Talk | Becky's husband in segment - '1952' | Television film |
| 1997 | Invasion | Mike Landry; aka 'Robin Cook's Invasion' | |
| 1998 | The Pentagon Wars | HBO movie; Junior officer at embassy party | |
| 1998 | Almost Heroes | New Bartender | |
| 1999 | Buddy Boy | Ken | |
| 2000 | The Crow: Salvation | Martin Toomey | Credited as Tim DeMay |
| 2000 | Big Eden | Dean Stewart | |
| 2001 | Nice Guys Finish Last | Dad | |
| 2001 | Swordfish | Agent | |
| 2001 | Taking Back Our Town | | Lifetime Channel Movie |
| 2002 | The Third Wheel | Speaker | |
| 2003 | Welcome to the Neighborhood | Bill | |
| 2004 | Control | Bill Caputo | |
| 2005 | The Chumscrubber | Mr. Peck | |
| 2006 | Peaceful Warrior | Coach Garrick | |
| 2006 | The Far Side of Jericho | The Stranger | |
| 2007 | Randy and The Mob | Bill | |
| 2008 | Monster Ark | Dr. Nicholas Zavaterro | |
| 2008 | Get Smart | Secret Service Agent | |
| 2008 | The Russell Girl | Tim Russell | Hallmark Channel movie |
| 2009 | Political Disasters | Jim | |
| 2015 | Best Man Wins | Edward Stiles | Short film |
| 2023 | Oppenheimer | John Pastore | |

=== Television ===
| Year | Title | Role | Notes |
|---|---|---|---|
| 1995–96 | SeaQuest DSV | Lawrence Deon | 3 episodes |
| 1996 | Seinfeld | Kevin | 2 episodes |
| 1996 | The Ring | Max Thomas | Miniseries; aka Danielle Steel's The Ring |
| 1996 | Grace Under Fire | Rev. Tom Maxwell | Episode: "The Ghost and Mrs. Kelly" |
| 1997 | The Larry Sanders Show | Gordon | Episode: "The Matchmaker" |
| 1997 | The Naked Truth | John | Episode: "We're at NBC Now" |
| 1997 | Touched by an Angel | J.D. Sinclair | Episode: "Smokescreen" |
| 1997 | Night Sins | Prof. Christopher Priest | Miniseries |
| 1997 | Diagnosis: Murder | Sonny Burnett | Episode: "A Mime Is a Terrible Thing to Waste" |
| 1997–99 | Party of Five | Dr. Paul Thomas | 12 episodes (recurring) |
| 1998 | Ellen | John | Episode: "Escape from L.A." |
| 1998 | Caroline in the City | Brian | 2 episodes |
| 1998 | Cupid | Jennings Crawford | Episode: "The Linguist" |
| 1998 | Brimstone | Prof. John Albright | Episode: "Heat" |
| 1999 | The Practice | Jerry Green | Episode: "Split Decisions" |
| 1999 | The Pretender | Eddie Fontenot | Episode: "Pool" |
| 1999–2000 | Sports Night | Ray Mitchel | 2 episodes |
| 2001 | Chestnut Hill | Peter Eastman | Pilot |
| 2001 | Murder, She Wrote | Robert Mercer | Episode: "The Last Free Man" |
| 2001 | Thieves | Owen | Episode: "The General" |
| 2002 | Ally McBeal | Kendall Willis | Episode: "A Kick in the Head" |
| 2002 | Friends | Marc | Episode: "The One Where Rachel Has A Baby: Part 1" |
| 2002 | Malcolm in the Middle | Matt | Episode: "Zoo" |
| 2002–03 | Everwood | Reverend Keyes | 3 episodes |
| 2003–05 | Carnivàle | Clayton 'Jonesy' Jones | 24 episodes (main) |
| 2004 | Without a Trace | Jim Cooper | Episode: "The Season" |
| 2005 | CSI: Crime Scene Investigation | Neal Matthews | Season 5 Episode 18: "Spark of Life" |
| 2006 | My Name Is Earl | Hank Lange | 2 episodes |
| 2006 | Standoff | John Barnes | Episode 2: "Circling" |
| 2006 | Cold Case | Geoff Taylor | Episode: "The War At Home" |
| 2007 | Hidden Palms | Mr. Miller | Pilot |
| 2007 | The 4400 | Drew Imroth | 2 episodes |
| 2007 | Numb3rs | Pete Friscia | Episode: "Robin Hood" |
| 2007 | Tell Me You Love Me | David | 10 episodes (main) |
| 2008 | NCIS | Senator Patrick Kiley | Episode: "Capitol Offense" |
| 2008 | The Cleaner | Neil Mullins | Episode: "Lie With Me" |
| 2008 | CSI: Miami | William Campbell | Episode: "Wrecking Crew" |
| 2008 | The New Adventures of Old Christine | Patrick Harris | 3 episodes |
| 2009 | Scrubs | Rich Hill | Episode: "My Nah Nah Nah" |
| 2009–14 | White Collar | FBI Agent Peter Burke | Main role; 81 episodes Also director and producer |
| 2011 | Law & Order: LA | Don Alvin | Episode: "Silver Lake" |
| 2011 | Chuck | Kieran Ryker | Episode: "Chuck Versus the Baby" |
| 2012 | Hot in Cleveland | Buddy | Episode: "Two Girls and a Rhino" |
| 2013 | Body of Proof | Caleb Banks | Episode: "Lost Souls" |
| 2014 | Revenge | Luke Gilliam | Episode: "Allegiance" |
| 2014 | Agents of S.H.I.E.L.D. | Senator Christian Ward | 2 episodes |
| 2015 | Dinner at Tiffani's | Self | 4 episodes |
| 2016 | Second Chance | Duval Pritchard | Main Cast, 11 episodes |
| 2017 | Lucifer | Professor Jason Carlisle | 2 episodes |
| 2017 | American Crime | J.D. Hesby | 6 episodes |
| 2018 | Here and Now | Steven Benjamin | 6 episodes |
| 2018 | Ballers | | Episode: "The Kids Are Aight" |
| 2020 | 68 Whiskey | Secretary of the Army Ryan Goodall | Episode: "Mr. Fix-It" |
| 2020 | The Expanse | Admiral Sauveterre | Episodes: "Churn", "Nemesis Games" |
| 2021 | FBI: Most Wanted | Angelo Carpenter | Episode: "Unhinged" |
| 2022–23 | 1923 | Bob Strafford | 3 episodes |
| 2023 | Law & Order | Judge Ephraim Raymer | Episode: "Bias" |
| 2025 | Bosch: Legacy | Corvus Pike | Season 3. Episode 6: "Broken Order" |
| 2025 | Chicago Med | Griffin Lancer | 2 episodes |
