= Sharif Atkins =

American actor (born 1975)

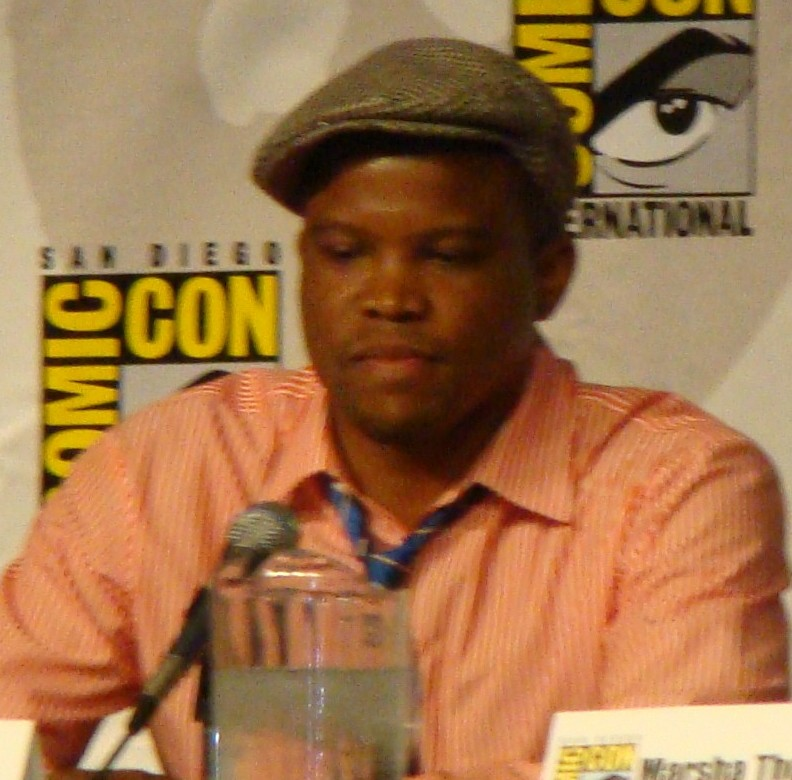
- Atkins at the 2010 San Diego Comic-Con
- Born: January 29, 1975 (age 51); Pittsburgh, Pennsylvania, U.S.
- Education: Northwestern University (BA)
- Occupation: Actor
- Years active: 1996–present
- Spouse: Bethany Hotchkiss (m. 2014)
- Children: 3

Sharif Atkins (born January 29, 1975) is an American actor. He is best known for his roles as Dr. Michael Gallant on ER (2001–2006), FBI Agent Clinton Jones on White Collar (2009–2014), and Captain Norman 'Boom Boom' Gates on NCIS: Hawaiʻi (2021–2024).

== Early life ==
Atkins was born in Pittsburgh, Pennsylvania, and grew up in Chicago, Illinois. He earned his bachelor's degree in theatre/speech from Northwestern University in 1997. While at Northwestern in 1996, Atkins was initiated as a member of the Kappa Alpha Psi fraternity (Theta chapter). In 1998, he studied at the Los Angeles Performing Arts Conservatory (formerly PDAC), before getting his start in film and television.

== Career ==
He gained fame for his role as Dr. Michael Gallant, a character that debuted in the eighth season (2001) of the NBC medical drama ER. He left ER after the 2003–2004 season. In 2004, he went on to star in the short-lived police drama Hawaii as former Chicago Police Department Detective John Declan, who transferred to an elite crime unit of the Honolulu Police Department. Atkins continued to make guest appearances in both the 2004–2005 and 2005–2006 seasons of ER, with his character returning on leave from duty in Iraq as a U.S. Army physician. His character was killed in Iraq at the end of the 2005–2006 season. Atkins also portrayed the recurring character Gary Navarro in the series The 4400. In 2005, Atkins appeared in the TV sitcom Eve as Shelly's boyfriend Grant.

Atkins played Special Agent Clinton Jones in USA Network's White Collar from 2009 to 2014.

He has appeared as Assistant United States Attorney Rivers in the CBS drama The Good Wife. In 2009, he appeared in season 4, episode 25 of Criminal Minds - "To Hell..." as Sgt. William Hightower. Atkins has also guest-starred in season 8 of CSI: Miami.

In 2014, he appeared as a Nova Corps pilot in Guardians of the Galaxy.

In 2021, he began a recurring role as Norman 'Boom Boom" Gates in NCIS: Hawaiʻi until the series was cancelled in 2024.

== Filmography ==
=== Film ===
Year	Title	Role	Notes
1999	Light It Up	Gunman	
2002	The Big Time	Joe Royal	
2006	Paved with Good Intentions	Rick Balden	
2010	Preacher's Kid	Wynton	
2014	Guardians of the Galaxy	Nova Arresting Pilot	
2015	Oceanus: Act One	Sam Jordan	Short film
2016	Second Sight	Richard	
2018	The Open House	Chris	
2021	Aftermath	Officer Richardson	

=== Television ===
Year	Title	Role	Notes
1998	Early Edition	Cashier	Episode: "The Fourth Carpathian"
1999	Early Edition	Bodyguard	Episode: "Number One with a Bullet"
1999	Turks	Black Kid	Episode: "Pilot"
2001	That's Life	Football Player	Episode: "Something Battered, Something Blue"
2001	The District	Cyrus Sparks	Episode: "The Project"
2001–2006	ER	Dr. Michael Gallant	Main role 2001–2004; recurring role 2005–2006
2002	Arliss	Jordan	Episode: "Standards and Practices"
2002	The Big Time	Joe Royal	TV film
2004	Hawaii	John Declan	TV series
2005–2006	Eve	Grant	Recurring role
2005–2006	The 4400	Gary Navarro	Episodes: "Voices Carry", "The New World", "The Home Front"
2006	In Justice	Ty Furlong	Episode: "Victims"
2007	Close to Home	Greg Ogletree	Episode: "Drink the Cup"
2007–2008	Numbers	Clay Porter	Episodes: "Thirteen", "End Game"
2008	Raising the Bar	Andy Hamilton	Episode: "Shop Till You Drop"
2009	My Manny	Mike	TV series
2009	Cold Case	James Valentine	Episode: "Officer Down"
2009	Criminal Minds	William Hightower	Episode: "To Hell... and Back"
2009	The New 20s: Episodes 1	Ralph	TV film
2009	CSI: Miami	Mathew Sloan	Episode: "Hostile Takeover"
2009–2014	White Collar	Clinton Jones	Main role
2010	The Good Wife	AUSA Harrison Rivers	Episode: "Fleas"
2011	Chase	Mark	Episode: "Roundup"
2012	House	Hayes	Episode: "Blowing the Whistle"
2015	Sleepy Hollow	Calvin Riggs	Episode: "What Lies Beneath"
2015	Rizzoli & Isles	FBI Special Agent Nate Burns	Episode: "Imitation Game"
2016	Lucifer	Prosecutor Earl Steadman	Episode: "Quid Pro Ho"
2017	SEAL Team	Senior Chief Special Warfare Operator Beau Fuller	Episodes: "The Spinning Wheel" and "The Exchange"
2018	The Gifted	Quinn	Episode: "no Mercy"
2019	Magnum P.I.	Detective Richard Johnson	Episode: "Dead Inside"
2019	Shameless	Peter Naylor	2 episodes
2019	The Good Doctor	Kane Omar	Episode: "Incomplete"
2019	Pearson	Mayor Mark Taylor	Episode: "The political wife"
2019	God Friended Me	Ben Evans	Episode: "The Dragon Slayer"
2021	Queen of the South	Captain Eli Gamble	Episode: "Fantasmas"
2021	9-1-1: Lone Star	Victor	Episode: "2100"
2021–2024	NCIS: Hawaiʻi	Captain Norman 'Boom Boom' Gates	Recurring role
2022	The Rookie	Police Officer	Episode: "Heart Beat"
2024	Me	Darren Kennedy	Recurring role
2024	Chicago Med	Joe Thomas	Episode: "Bite your tongue"
