= Willie Garson =

American actor (1964–2021)

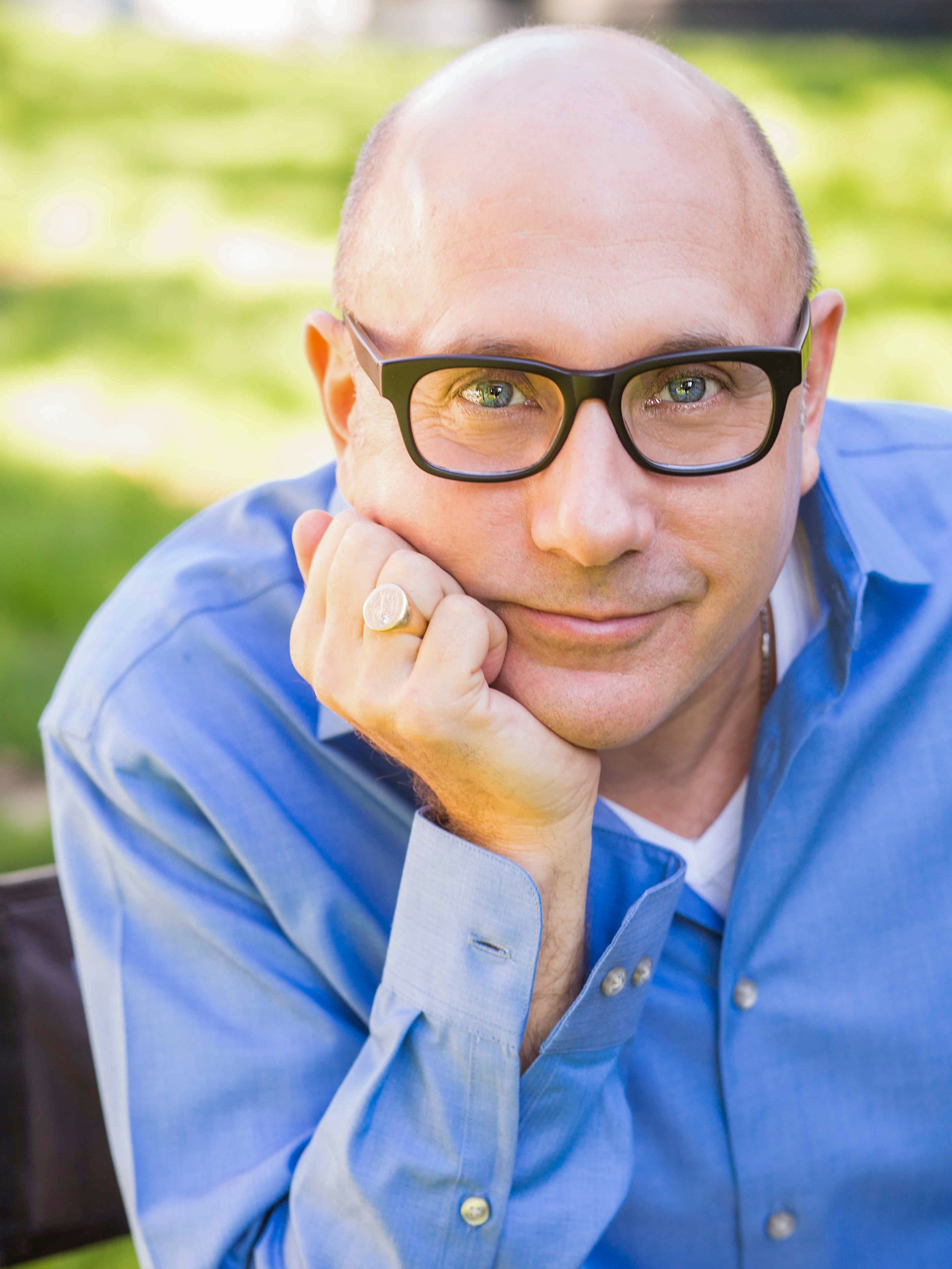
- Garson in 2018
- Born: William Garson Paszamant; February 20, 1964; Highland Park, New Jersey, U.S.
- Died: September 21, 2021 (aged 57); Los Angeles, California, U.S.
- Resting place: Forest Lawn Memorial Park
- Education: Wesleyan University (BFA); Yale University (MFA)
- Occupation: Actor
- Years active: 1986–2021
- Children: 1

William Garson Paszamant (February 20, 1964 – September 21, 2021) was an American actor. He appeared in over 75 films and more than 300 TV episodes. He was known for playing Stanford Blatch on the series Sex and the City, in the related films Sex and the City and Sex and the City 2 and in the spin-off And Just Like That..., Mozzie in the series White Collar from 2009 to 2014, Ralph in the 2005 romantic comedy Little Manhattan, Gerard Hirsch in the reboot of Hawaii Five-0, and Martin Lloyd in the sci-fi series Stargate SG-1.

== Early life and education ==
William Garson Paszamant was born in Highland Park, New Jersey, on February 20, 1964, the son of Muriel (née Schwartz) and Donald M. Paszamant, and the brother of Lisa Paszamant Clark and John Paszamant. Garson was Jewish. He attended Camp Wekeela in Hartford, Maine, as a child for 11 years.

He graduated in 1982 from Highland Park High School. In 1985, he received a Bachelor of Fine Arts degree in Theater from Wesleyan University and a Master of Fine Arts degree from the Yale Drama School.

== Career ==
=== Television ===
Garson had a recurring role as Henry Coffield on NYPD Blue and as Stanford Blatch on Sex and the City. His other television appearances include Mr. Belvedere; My Two Dads; Coach; Quantum Leap (once as a newspaper salesman/hack writer; and once as Lee Harvey Oswald); Twin Peaks; Monk; Boy Meets World and Girl Meets World (playing four different characters in the two shows' shared fictional universe); Ally McBeal; Party of Five; Star Trek: Voyager; Special Unit 2; Just Shoot Me!; Ask Harriet; Buffy the Vampire Slayer; Friends (as Ross Geller's neighbor in the episode "The One With the Girl Who Hits Joey"); Nash Bridges in the episode "Crosstalk"; The X-Files (twice and as two different characters); Cheers (as a waiter in the episode "Cape Cad"); Yes, Dear; CSI: Crime Scene Investigation; Pushing Daisies; Stargate SG-1 (3 episodes); Wizards of Waverly Place; CSI: Miami; Mental; Spin City; and Taken. He co-starred in the 2007 HBO series John from Cincinnati. He co-starred as Mozzie in the USA Network series White Collar from 2009 to 2014. From 2019 to 2020, he was a regular guest star on the syndicated game show 25 Words or Less and the Netflix series Big Mouth.

=== Film ===
Garson also appeared in three movies from the Farrelly brothers: Kingpin, There's Something About Mary, and Fever Pitch. His other film credits include Groundhog Day, Just Like Heaven, The Rock, Fortress 2: Re-Entry, Being John Malkovich, Freaky Friday, Labor Pains, and Out Cold. He made a cameo in the end credits of Jackass Number Two, with the full context of the cameo being explained in a tribute to the then-recently deceased Garson in Jackass 2.5. His last film role was in Before I Go (2021).

== Personal life and death ==
Garson adopted an eight-year-old boy in 2009. Though he is mainly known for playing a gay man on Sex and the City, he was heterosexual.

Garson died from pancreatic cancer at his home in Los Angeles, California, on September 21, 2021, at age 57.

== Filmography ==
=== Film ===
Year	Title	Role	Notes
1987	The Price of Life	Father	Short film
1989	Troop Beverly Hills	Bruce	
1990	Nowhere Land	Store Owner	Short film
1990	Brain Dead	Board Member	
1990	The Adventures of Ford Fairlane	Frat Boy	
1990	Repossessed	Nerd Student	
1991	Across the Tracks	Salesman	
1991	The Walter Ego	Egg w/ Glasses	Short film
1991	Soapdish	Nitwit Executive	
1991	Mobsters	Telephone Operator	
1992	Ruby	Lee Harvey Oswald	
1993	Groundhog Day	Phil's Assistant Kenny	
1993	Untamed Heart	Patsy	
1993	When the Party's Over	Vic Montana	
1993	Daybreak	Simon	
1994	Cityscrapes: Los Angeles	John	
1994	Black Sheep	Anthony Guifoyle	
1994	Every Breath	Bob	
1994	Speechless	Dick	
1995	Things to Do in Denver When You're Dead	Cuffy	
1995	The Tie That Binds	Ray Tanton	
1996	Alone in the Woods	Lyle	
1996	The Destiny of Marty Fine	Jack	
1996	The Rock	Francis Reynolds	
1996	Kingpin	Purse Snatcher	
1996	Mars Attacks!	Corporate Guy	
1997	Cyclops, Baby	Willie	
1998	There's Something About Mary	Dr. Zit Face/High School Pal	
1998	Living Out Loud	Man in Elevator	
1999	The Suburbans	Craig	
1999	Being John Malkovich	Guy in Restaurant	
1999	Play It to the Bone	Cappie Caplan	
2000	Our Lips Are Sealed	Agent Norm	
2000	Fortress 2	Stanley Nussbaum	
2000	What Planet Are You From?	Brett	
2001	Out Cold	Ted Muntz	
2002	Luster	Sonny Spike	
2003	Special	Suspicious Wheelchair Guy	Short film
2003	Freaky Friday	Evan	
2003	A Problem with Fear	Erin	
2004	The Crux	Man Holding the Rope	Short film
2004	Seeing Other People	Suspicious Wheelchair Guy	Short film
2004	House of D	Ticket Agent	
2005	Fever Pitch	Dr. Kevin	
2005	Just like Heaven	Maitre D'	
2005	Little Manhattan	Ralph	
2006	Thank Heaven	Grant Strong	
2006	The TV Set	Brian	
2006	Zoom	Dick	
2006	Jackass Number Two	Himself	Guest appearance
2007	Hard Four	Orville Chisholm	
2008	Beau Jest	Joel Goldman	
2008	Sex and the City	Stanford Blatch	
2009	Shannon's Rainbow	Richard	
2009	Labor Pains	Carl	
2010	Ashley's Ashes	Limus	
2010	Sex and the City 2	Stanford Blatch	
2010	Monster Heroes	Tom Trudell	
2012	Fops	The King	Short film
2012	Periods.		
2014	Walk of Shame	Dan Karlin	
2016	Trust Fund	Jerry Peters	
2017	The Polka King	Lonny	
2017	Feed	Mr. Brack	
2019	7 Days to Vegas	Danny	
2020	The Bellmen	Alan	
2020	Magic Camp	Casino Manager	
2021	Before I Go	Francis	

=== Television ===
Year	Title	Role	Notes
1986	The Deliberate Stranger		Miniseries
1986	Family Ties	Walter	Episode: "Paper Chase"
1986	Cheers	Waiter	Episode: "The Cape Cad"
1986	You Again?	Clerk	Episode: "Quit Is a Four Letter Word"
1986	The Disney Sunday Movie	Gladstone's Assistant	Episode: "The Leftovers (31.7)"
1986–1987	Newhart	Mr. Whorley / Steve	2 episodes: "Desperately Desiring Susan: Part 2"; "Reading, Writing, and Rating Points"
1986–1990	Mr. Belvedere	Carl	Recurring role
1987	My Two Dads	Tom	Episode: "Crime and Punishment"
1988–1989	It's a Living	Phil Roman	3 episodes
1989	Coach	Clerk	Episode: "The Loss Weekend"
1989	Peter Gunn	Rusty	TV movie
1989	Chicken Soup	Waiter	Episode: "Double Date"
1989–1992	Quantum Leap	Alik Idell / Lee Harvey Oswald / Seymour	3 episodes
1990	Thirtysomething	Ray	Episode: "Good Sex, Some Sex, What Sex, No Sex"
1990	Booker	Mac Larson	Episode: "Mobile Home"
1991	Twin Peaks	Heavy Metal Roadie	Episode #2.20
1991	American Playhouse	Father	Episode: "The Price of Life"
1993	Moon Over Miami		Episode: "Watching the Detectives"
1993	L.A. Law	Jay Berg	Episode: "Odor in the Court"
1993	Big Al	Ricki	TV short
1993	Flying Blind	Leech Boy	Episode: "The Bride of Marsh Man 2: The Spawning"
1993	A League of Their Own	Clark Powell	Episode: "Marathon"
1993, 1996, 1999	Boy Meets World	Leonard Spinelli / Mervyn / The Minister	4 episodes
1994	Renegade	Tommy	Episode: "Once Burned, Twice Chey"
1994	Ray Alexander: A Taste for Justice	Associate	TV movie
1995	Pig Sty	Hansen	2 episodes: "Mr. Nice Guy"; "Leap Into an Open Grave"
1995	MADtv	Lee Harvey Oswald	Episode: "Kato Kaelin/Poison"
1995	The Barefoot Executive	Assistant	TV movie
1995	Partners	Larry	Episode: "Do We Have to Write You a Check?"
1995	Mad About You	Randall	Episode: "New Year's Eve"
1995, 1999	The X-Files	Quinton 'Roach' Freely / Henry Weems	2 episodes: "The Walk"; "The Goldberg Variation"
1996	Touched by an Angel	Eddie Brenner	Episode: "Dear God"
1996–1999	NYPD Blue	Henry Coffield	7 episodes
1997	VR.5	Strange Guy	Episode: "Sisters"
1997	Caroline in the City	Annoying Guy	Episode: "Caroline and the Monkeys"
1997	The Practice	D.A. Frank Shea	2 episodes: "Trial and Error"; "Dog Bite"
1997–1998	Melrose Place	Dr. Mosley	2 episodes: "Secrets and Wives"; "Coop de Grace"
1997–1998	Ally McBeal	Alan Farmer / Frank Shea	2 episodes: "Compromising Positions"; "These Are the Days"
1998	Ask Harriet	Ronnie Rendall	Main cast
1998	Buffy the Vampire Slayer	Security Guard	Episode: "Killed by Death"
1998	Conrad Bloom	Spencer	Episode: "Gone with the Re-Wind"
1998	Party of Five	Mr. Kroop	3 episodes
1998	Star Trek: Voyager	Riga	Episode: "Thirty Days"
1998–2004	Sex and the City	Stanford Blatch	Recurring role
1999	Friends	Steve Cera	Episode: "The One with the Girl Who Hits Joey"
1999	Just Shoot Me!	Kurt	Episode: "Miss Pretty"
1999	Early Edition	Willie Dretler	Episode: "The Out-of-Towner"
1999	Come On Get Happy: The Partridge Family Story	Sam	TV movie
1999	Nash Bridges	Leonard Voss	Episode: "Crosstalk"
2000	City of Angels	Norman Lewis	Episode: "Cry Me a Liver"
2000	Hollywood Off-Ramp		Episode: "And on Your Left..."
2000	Level 9	Bones	2 episodes: "Mail Call"; "DefCon"
2000	Spin City	Ned	Episode: "Blind Faith"
2000–2006	Stargate SG-1	Martin Lloyd	3 episodes
2001	Going to California	Percy Utley	Episode: "A Pirate Looks at 15 to 20"
2001–2002	Special Unit 2	Amphorian / Cupid / Little Brother / Ross Bowman	2 episodes: "The Brothers"; "The Love"
2002	Taken	Dr. Kreutz	2 episodes
2003	Greetings from Tucson	Mr. Gargan	Episode: "Counseling"
2003	CSI: Crime Scene Investigation	Bud Simmons / Sexy Kitty	Episode: "Fur and Loathing"
2003	Harry's Girl		TV movie
2004	All About the Andersons	Bud Barber	Episode: "Get Out of Dodge... Ball"
2004	Yes, Dear	Gordon	Episode: "Kim and Gordon"
2004	The Division	Deke	Episode: "The Box"
2004	Monk	Leo Navarro	Episode: "Mr. Monk and the Panic Room"
2004	Wild Card	Alan Farmer / Brad Pitt	Episode: "Die, Die, Who Am I?"
2005–2006	CSI: Miami	Ian Sutter / Ian Sutton	2 episodes: "Sex & Taxes"; "If Looks Could Kill"
2006	Las Vegas	Pete Natelson	Episode: "Bait and Switch"
2007	John from Cincinnati	Meyer Dickstein	Main cast
2008	Chocolate News	Larry Turner	Episode: "Episode #1.1"
2009	Imagination Movers	Pants Armstrong	Episode: "Second Chance Pants"
2009	Wizards of Waverly Place	Mr. Frenchy	Episode: "Fashion Week"
2009	Pushing Daisies	Dick Dicker	Episode: "Window Dressed to Kill"
2009	Medium	Alan Hitchens	Episode: "The Talented Ms. Boddicker"
2009	Mental	Leonard Steinberg	Episode: "Rainy Days"
2009–2014	White Collar	Mozzie	Main cast
2011	The Whole Truth		Episode: "The End"
2011–2015	Whole Day Down	Willie	Main cast
2012	Hot in Cleveland	Dr. Brotz	Episode: "God and Football"
2013	Two and a Half Men	Dr. Steven Staven	Episode: "Run, Steven Staven! Run!"
2013	Wendell & Vinnie	Jury member	Episode: "Mock Law & Order"
2013	How to Live with Your Parents (For the Rest of Your Life)	Harry	Episode: "How to Live with the Academy Awards Party"
2014	Girl Meets World	Harrison Miller	Episode: "Girl Meets Popular"
2014	Franklin & Bash	Dr. Nick Beckman	Episode: "Kershaw v. Lincecum"
2015	Weird Loners	Carl	Episode: "Weird Knight"
2015–2020	Hawaii Five-0	Gerard Hirsch	Guest role (seasons 5, 7–9), recurring role (season 6)
2016	The Mysteries of Laura	George Tilieu	Episode: "The Mystery of the Downward Spiral"
2017	Scandal	Protester	Episode: "Day 101"
2018	Salvation	Dr. Carson	Episode: "Get Ready"
2019–2020	Supergirl	Steve Lomeli	3 episodes
2019	Conversations in L.A.	Dr. Kerr	Episode: "Wed-Lock"
2019	Magnum P.I.	Gerard Hirsch	Episode: "Blood Brothers"
2020	Big Mouth	Various voices	3 episodes
2021	And Just Like That...	Stanford Blatch	Posthumous release; 3 episodes
