= Confirmed Dead =

- Lost episode
- Episode no.: Season 4 Episode 2
- Directed by: Stephen Williams
- Written by: Drew Goddard; Brian K. Vaughan
- Production code: 402
- Original air date: February 7, 2008
- Running time: 43 minutes

Guest appearances
- Jeff Fahey as Frank Lapidus; Mira Furlan as Danielle Rousseau; Tania Raymonde as Alex; Blake Bashoff as Karl Martin; Marsha Thomason as Naomi Dorrit; Lance Reddick as Matthew Abaddon; Zoë Bell as Regina; Fisher Stevens as George Minkowski; Jill Kuramoto as Female anchor; Necar Zadegan as Translator; Azure McCall as Mrs. Gardner; Kanayo Chiemelu as African man

Episode chronology
← Previous "The Beginning of the End"	Next → "The Economist"
- Lost season 4

"Confirmed Dead" is the second episode of the fourth season of ABC's serial television drama Lost and the 74th episode overall. It was first aired on February 7, 2008, on ABC in the United States and on CTV in Canada.

The episode includes the first appearances of the main characters Miles Straume and Charlotte Lewis and the supporting character Frank Lapidus. Ken Leung played Miles Straume, Rebecca Mader played Charlotte Lewis and Jeff Fahey played Frank Lapidus. The actors were given fake scenes when auditioning to limit the leak of story information or spoilers. Mader and Fahey were different from the writers' visions of Charlotte and Frank, but the writers changed the characters to suit them. Also, the role of Miles was changed for Leung. The episode was written by co-executive producer Drew Goddard and co-producer Brian K. Vaughan and directed by co-executive producer Stephen Williams.

The beginning of the episode is set on December 21, 2004, or 91 days after the original characters crash-land on a tropical island from Oceanic Airlines Flight 815. During the show, flashbacks introduce the island's latest arrivals – four people from an offshore freighter who landed on the island. The main action is of John Locke (Terry O'Quinn) leading his group to the Barracks. He begins to find out why Ben Linus (Michael Emerson) is afraid of the newcomers. "Confirmed Dead" was watched by 17 million Americans and received generally positive critical reception as reviewers praised the introduction of the new characters.

== Plot ==
The episode's five flashbacks focus on the reactions and activities of the freighter's crew who made contact with the Oceanic 815 survivors; Daniel Faraday (Jeremy Davies) is shown crying while watching a newscast confirming the deaths of all Oceanic 815 passengers. His caretaker asks why he is crying, and he answers that he does not know. Miles Straume (Ken Leung) is a medium hired by an elderly woman to remove the ghost of her grandson from her home. After conversing with the spirit, Miles finds a hidden cache of money and drugs. Charlotte Lewis (Rebecca Mader) is an anthropologist who finds a polar bear skeleton bearing a Dharma Initiative collar buried in the Tunisian desert. Frank Lapidus (Jeff Fahey) is an alcoholic who was originally scheduled to pilot flight 815. He phones the Oceanic hotline while watching the newscast and claims that the footage of the plane wreckage being aired on television is not authentic, while Naomi Dorrit (Marsha Thomason) is shown in a posthumous flashback, criticizing her employer Matthew Abaddon (Lance Reddick) for his choice in her coworkers. Matthew tells her the entire mission depends on her escorting the team, staying alive, and ensuring that everyone leaves alive.

After Daniel parachutes from a failing helicopter onto the island, he uses Naomi's phone to contact George Minkowski (Fisher Stevens) on the ship that he came from. The next morning, on December 22, 2004, two of the flight 815 survivors – Jack Shephard (Matthew Fox) and Kate Austen (Evangeline Lilly) – help Daniel find his colleagues, as the rival group led by Locke attempts to do the same. Jack and Kate find Miles, who demands to see Naomi's body, and reasons that Naomi was killed by Kate as Naomi said a code on the phone before dying. Kate confesses then that Naomi was killed by John Locke. Locke's group finds Charlotte, takes her prisoner, and disposes of her tracking device. Daniel's third colleague, helicopter pilot Frank, fires a flare into the sky, leading Jack's group to him. Frank tells Jack's group that he managed to land the helicopter intact. After finding out that Juliet Burke (Elizabeth Mitchell) is one of the Others, Miles demands to know where Ben (Michael Emerson) is, as locating him is the freighter crew's primary objective. In Locke's group, several people become discontent with Locke's revelation that he is following the instructions of Walt Lloyd (Malcolm David Kelley), who had left the island a month earlier, and they also question why Ben is being kept alive. Locke holds him at gunpoint, and Ben starts to reveal information about the Kahana crew, specifically Charlotte's identity and that he has a spy aboard the ship.

== Production ==
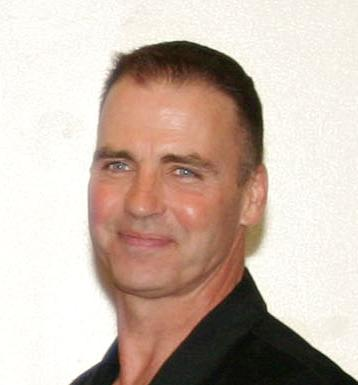
Fahey in 2004 without a beard

While casting the "freighter folk" – the nickname that Lost's executive producers/writers/show runners Damon Lindelof and Carlton Cuse use to refer to Daniel, Charlotte, Miles and Frank – fake names, occupations and scenes were temporarily assigned, to limit the leak of spoilers. After seeing Ken Leung guest star on HBO's The Sopranos in April 2007, Lindelof and Cuse wrote the role of Miles specifically for him, although it was initially reported that Leung would be playing the part of "brilliant mathematician" "Russell". The name Miles Straume was simply chosen because the writer-producers thought that "it would be cool if his name sounded like 'maelstrom'". Had he not taken the part, Lindelof and Cuse claim that Miles would have been scrapped and a new and very different character would have been written into the story instead. Leung, who was originally contracted as a recurring guest star, was quoted as saying that "Miles doesn't know how to be social, which is great, because I don't know how to be social." Costume designer Roland Sanchez wanted to base one of the freighter folk's clothing after that of Keith Richards, specifically a picture in which he wore a sleeveless vest, which he admired. Sanchez believed that Miles fitted the haggard look and bought an Armani Exchange jacket, cut off the sleeves and added a hood, and that this outfit helped Leung to develop Miles. Co-executive producer/writer Edward Kitsis had been pitching the name "Lapidus" for years, finally naming an unseen character in the fourteenth episode of the third season Rick Lapidus. Unsatisfied, Kitsis developed the character "Frank Lapidus, Helicopter Pilot". According to the show runners, recurring guest star Jeff Fahey "was the first and only choice for the role". They also commended his "intense eyes" and stated that "he has exactly the right sensibilities" for the part. Frank was not envisioned with a beard, however, the writer-producers allowed Fahey to keep it for the role. The writer-producers have said that Frank "never takes anything at face value [and is] a true conspiracy nut [who] has probably seen every episode of The X-Files, [which will] pay off for him".

Rebecca Mader's audition scene was a fake flashback and she was disappointed that it was not used for the show. The character's name was spoiled months in advance of broadcast. Charlotte was originally envisioned as an American; however, the writers preferred Mader's natural English accent to her fake American accent and they changed Charlotte accordingly. Lost's writer-producers compared Mader to "a young Nicole Kidman". During the casting process, Charlotte was described as a "successful academic". It was falsely rumored that Kristen Bell was offered the role of Charlotte; Bell had actually spoken to the producers about having a part; however, no role was offered to her. Despite never having seen Lost, Mader decided that she "was not going to leave [the auditioning] room until [she] made [Lindelof and Cuse] fall in love with [her]". Mader subsequently began to watch the first three seasons of Lost and was watching the fourth episode when she received the news that she had been chosen for the role. In the next two to three weeks, Mader – who was then signed on as a recurring guest star – watched the rest of the first three seasons, watching the third-season finale a matter of hours before she began shooting her first "Confirmed Dead" scene, in which Charlotte meets Locke and his group. Mader was told little about her character by the writer-producers, except that "she was sort of like a female Indiana Jones type". Mader has found it challenging but fun to play a character with an unknown backstory and motives. Charlotte's full name is Charlotte Staples Lewis, which is an homage to the author C.S. Lewis, best known for The Chronicles of Narnia and various books about Christianity. Lewis was one of Mader's favorite authors as a child and found it "wicked" and "cool" for her character to be named after him. Mader also enjoyed that she only requires a small amount of hair and makeup done, saying that "I just wanted to rough it. I wanted to roll around in the mud with a gun." Mader claims that she has "never had so much fun in [her] life" as when she is shooting Lost. In the episode, Charlotte's birthday is said to be July 2, 1979. This led to a minor continuity error in the fifth-season episode "LaFleur", when Charlotte is depicted as being a little girl in 1974. Executive producers Cuse and Lindelof claimed in a podcast that the original script for "Confirmed Dead" listed Charlotte's birthday as being in 1970 and that Mader had it changed because she did not want people to think she was significantly older than she actually is. This caused a controversy when Mader later stated on her blog that Gregg Nations, the script coordinator, was the one who suggested the change. Cuse and Lindelof later conceded that she was right.

Most or all of the episode was shot from September 11 to 23, 2007 and filming overlapped with the following episode. The Tunisian desert scene was filmed on location in Oahu, Hawaii, like the rest of the episode, at a stone quarry with industrial fans blowing fake sand. A typical Lost episode contains fifty visual effects shots. Among scenes created entirely or partially with effects are the opening scene of "Confirmed Dead", which shows what appears to be the wreckage of 815 underwater and the scene from Daniel's perspective as he parachutes from the helicopter to the ground. In Frank's flashback, he drops a toy plane, which spirals into a small aquarium. This shot was not intended to use effects; however, "it's impossible to get a toy plane to spiral the way you want it to", according to supervisor Mitch Suskin. A tank with still water and rocks on the bottom was filmed and the plane was added in editing. Suskin said that creating effects for "Confirmed Dead" "was slightly too leisurely" because the episode aired over four months after post-production began.

In fall 2007, Lost's writers presented ABC executives with the story that a salvage vessel called the Christiane I looking for the Black Rock, among other things, in the Sunda Trench would come across what would appear to be the wreckage of 815. ABC hired the Australian company Hoodlum to design a $3 million viral marketing alternate reality game (ARG) titled Find 815. Find 815 ran from December 28, 2007, to January 31, 2008, beginning with a press release issued from ABC Medianet announcing the fictitious return of the fictional Oceanic Airlines' return to business. The ARG – apparently the largest ever – followed Sam Thomas, an Oceanic technician who had lost his girlfriend in the crash, as he received cryptic e-mails from The Maxwell Group (a division of Widmore Industries, but nonexistent in Lost), joined the crew of the Christiane I and ultimately uncovered 815. Because Find 815 was produced separately from the show and without the show's writers, it contradicts events in the TV series. In "Confirmed Dead", 815 is found by a man not present in the game named Ron; Thomas is not mentioned. Lindelof and Cuse dismissed the game as not being canon (not containing genuine information within the fictional universe) and was largely just a bonus for fans during the between-seasons hiatus.

== Reception ==
"Confirmed Dead" was watched by 15.292 million American viewers live or recorded and watched within six hours of broadcast, ranking Lost seventh in the weekly chart. It was watched by a total of 16.963 million viewers, including those who watched within seven days of broadcast; this number went toward the year-end season average. The episode received a 6.5/16 in the key adults 18–49 demographic. In Canada, it ranked sixth for the week with 1.702 million viewers. In the United Kingdom, Lost was watched by 1.2 million viewers – a larger audience than that of the season premiere. In Australia, "Confirmed Dead" brought in 853,000 viewers, ranking seventy-first for the week. American critics were sent screener DVDs of "The Beginning of the End" and "Confirmed Dead" on January 28, 2008, with instructions not to reveal major plot points in reviews. Among the journalists who gave vague and positive reviews were Mary McNamara of the Los Angeles Times, Maureen Ryan of the Chicago Tribune, Diane Werts of Newsday and Tim Goodman of the San Francisco Chronicle. According to Oscar Dahl of BuddyTV, "Confirmed Dead" "was met with almost universal love from the Lost fan base" and according to Jon Lachonis of UGO, the new characters were well received by the fan scene.

Alan Sepinwall of The Star-Ledger wrote that "after an underwhelming pre-credits sequence ... this sucker moved, and lots of things happened. We met our four new regulars, squeezed in useful flashbacks about [them] and even found out the real reason they're on the island ... The flipside of all this business is that 'Confirmed Dead' didn't have the same emotional resonance as '[The] Beginning of the End' ... but you clearly can't have everything in every episode." Time's James Poniewozik said that "What amazed [him] about this episode was the economy and precision with which it introduced ... the crew of the downed chopper from [the freighter]. Each got just one flashback and a little time on the island, and yet by the end of the episode, I felt I had a true handle on what they were like as individuals." Jeff Jensen of Entertainment Weekly thought that "Confirmed Dead" "was downright alive with fascinating new characters, mind-blowing new possibilities, and exciting new theory fodder"; however, he had heard complaints from others who received the preview screeners that they found the episode to be flawed. They considered the scene where 815 is found to be cheating the flashback formula because Daniel only experiences it by watching it on television, Frank's safe landing of the helicopter to be a mystery, Naomi's flashback to be cheating Lost rules because she is dead and Ben's manipulation of Locke to be an overused storyline. E!'s Kristin Dos Santos exclaimed "hot damn!" in response to the scene where 815 is found in the Sunda Trench. She also thought that "Juliet and Kate giggling at Jack's 'wink thing' was hilarious" and it was "awesome to see [the pilot] again". Nikki Stafford of Wizard highlighted "watching Dan's landing from his point of view. You can feel his panic as he's free-falling through the air, looks up at his parachute, looks down to see himself about to hit the trees ... it was amazing." IGN's Chris Carabott gave "Confirmed Dead" an 8/10, writing that it "isn't a disappointing episode by any means but it definitely suffers from being a 'setup' episode for these four new characters" and praising the new actors by writing that "Leung does an adequate job of getting Miles' arrogant brand of confidence across while Davies presents Faraday's awkward mannerisms well. Fahey's Lapidus has exceptional screen presence that even overshadows the regular cast members to an extent." Erin Martell of AOL's TV Squad said that "Watching 'Confirmed Dead' was like watching my dream episode of Lost [because] people asked direct questions for once ... [and] this episode was all about the Freighties." A day after the original broadcast, BuddyTV's Dahl claimed that "[the audience is] on an epic journey, one that has been as entertaining and engrossing as any TV series has ever been". In contrast, TV Guide's Michael Ausiello of said that it "was thirty-one flavors of awesome ... [however] the negatives outweighed the positives". He had problems with Claire's lack of grief for Charlie Pace's (Dominic Monaghan) death and Jack waiting so long to find out the freighter folk's main objective. Ben Rawson-Jones of Digital Spy gave "Confirmed Dead" three out of five stars, calling it "so-so", but commenting that "the new revelations in the episode are fairly startling and provide a momentary distraction from the frustrations."
