= The Beginning of the End (Lost) =

- Lost episode
- Jack Shephard and Kate Austen waiting for rescuers from the freighter.
- Episode no.: Season 4 Episode 1
- Directed by: Jack Bender
- Written by: Damon Lindelof; Carlton Cuse
- Production code: 401
- Original air date: January 31, 2008
- Running time: 42 minutes

Guest appearances
- Mira Furlan as Danielle Rousseau; Sam Anderson as Bernard Nadler; L. Scott Caldwell as Rose Nadler; Tania Raymonde as Alex; Blake Bashoff as Karl Martin; Marsha Thomason as Naomi Dorrit; Michael Cudlitz as "Big Mike" Walton; Lance Reddick as Matthew Abaddon; John Terry as Christian Shephard; Fisher Stevens as Minkowski; Billy Ray Gallion as Randy Nations; Grisel Toledo as Susie Lazenby; Steven Neumeier as Lewis

Episode chronology
← Previous "Through the Looking Glass"	Next → "Confirmed Dead"
- Lost season 4

"The Beginning of the End" is the fourth season premiere, and 73rd episode overall, of the American Broadcasting Company's television drama series Lost. It was aired on ABC in the United States and CTV in Canada on January 31, 2008. Co-creator/executive producer Damon Lindelof and executive producer Carlton Cuse wrote the premiere in late July 2007, with most of the episode directed on location in Oahu, Hawaii, in August and September by executive producer Jack Bender. With this premiere, Jeff Pinkner no longer serves as an executive producer and staff writer. The episode was watched by 18 million Americans, bringing in the best ratings for Lost in 17 episodes. According to Metacritic, "The Beginning of the End" garnered "universal acclaim".

The narrative takes place over 90 days after the crash of Oceanic Flight 815, on December 23, 2004. The stranded crash survivors make contact with associates of Naomi Dorrit (played by Marsha Thomason) on a nearby freighter, but the survivors divide when they hear that those on the freighter may not be coming to rescue the survivors. Flashforwards show the post-island lives of Hugo "Hurley" Reyes (Jorge Garcia) and Jack Shephard (Matthew Fox). They are lying to the public about their time on the island. In flashforwards, Hurley has visions of his deceased friend Charlie Pace (Dominic Monaghan); in the present, Hurley grieves over Charlie's death on the island. Daniel Faraday (Jeremy Davies) makes his first appearance in "The Beginning of the End".

== Plot ==
After being knifed in the back by John Locke (Terry O'Quinn) in the third-season finale, Naomi uses her satellite phone to call George Minkowski (Fisher Stevens) on the freighter. Before she dies, she tells him that her injury was an accident and to give her love to her sister. Meanwhile, Hurley finds Jacob's cabin. He looks through the window and sees an unidentified man in a rocking chair, before someone steps up to the glass, only the left eye visible. Hurley runs away, but finds the cabin again—in a different location. He squeezes his eyes shut and when he opens them, the building is gone and Locke appears.

Desmond Hume (Henry Ian Cusick) returns from the Looking Glass, bearing Charlie's final message that the freighter offshore is not owned by Penny Widmore (Sonya Walger). The survivors reunite at 815's cockpit. Jack knocks Locke to the ground, takes his gun and pulls the trigger, but finds that the gun is not loaded because Locke had no intention of killing Jack earlier that day. Locke tells the castaways that they are in great danger and leaves for the Barracks with Hurley, James "Sawyer" Ford (Josh Holloway), Claire Littleton (Emilie de Ravin) and her baby Aaron, Danielle Rousseau (Mira Furlan) and her captive Ben Linus (Michael Emerson), Alex (Tania Raymonde) and her boyfriend Karl (Blake Bashoff), Vincent the dog (Pono) and four other survivors. Soon after, Jack and Kate see a helicopter and meet Daniel.

Flashforwards show that Hurley is famous as one of the "Oceanic Six" after his escape from the island and is keeping quiet about his time there. Hurley encounters an apparition of Charlie. Shocked, he speeds away in his Camaro and is apprehended by Los Angeles police. Hurley is interrogated by Ana Lucia Cortez's (Michelle Rodriguez) former partner Detective "Big" Mike Walton (Michael Cudlitz) and he lies that he has no knowledge of Ana Lucia. Hurley, looking at the interrogation room's mirror glass, imagines seeing Charlie swimming in water until he breaks the glass and floods the room. Hurley willingly returns to the Santa Rosa Mental Health Institution, where he is visited by Matthew Abaddon (Lance Reddick), who claims to be an attorney for Oceanic Airlines. When Abaddon fails to supply a business card, he asks if they are still alive before stealthily exiting. An apparition of Charlie appears who tells Hurley that "they" need him. Finally, Hurley is visited by Jack, who is thinking of growing a beard. Jack confirms that Hurley will not reveal the Oceanic Six's secrets. Hurley apologizes for going with Locke and insists that they return to the island, but Jack refuses (which shows that these flashforwards occur before Jack's flashforwards).

== Production ==
During casting, fake names, occupations and scenes were temporarily assigned to limit the leak of spoilers. Lance Reddick was told that he was auditioning for the part of "Arthur Stevens", a "ruthless corporate recruiter", instead of Matthew Abaddon. "Matthew" and "Abaddon" were revealed as season 4 clue words in the alternate reality game Find 815. The writers chose the character's surname after they read the Wikipedia article on Abaddon, which states that it means "place of destruction". The writer-producers were originally interested in having Reddick play Mr. Eko during the second season, however, he was busy starring on HBO's The Wire. Jeremy Davies was cast as Daniel because he is one of the writer-producers' favorite character actors, and they think that his "transformative quality [and] the tremendous intelligence that seems to emanate from him ... seemed perfect for [the part]", which was originally planned to be a recurring role. When Davies met costume designer Roland Sanchez, he was wearing a thin black tie. Sanchez merged this "cool, edgy look" with his idea for the character's clothes: a "nerdy" loosely woven dress shirt from J.Crew.

Several different titles were proposed for the episode. The ultimate title is a reference to a line in the previous episode when Ben warns Jack that contacting the freighter "is the beginning of the end". Filming began on August 17 and ended on or just after September 7, 2007. Garcia felt "a little pressure" because he had the lead role in the episode, but "was really excited, too [because it] was a different direction for a season premiere [that he] felt the fans would probably dig". In the mental institution, Hurley is seen painting a picture of an Inuk man and an igloo. This was painted by Garcia. When the episode was broadcast, Christian appeared in Jacob's cabin; however, the scene was shot with another Hurley inside. Additionally, when Garcia was filming his interrogation scene in an aquarium, he was unaware that Charlie would be swimming outside and breaking the glass in the finished product. Charlie's swim was filmed weeks after the rest of the episode had been shot, alongside production of "Meet Kevin Johnson" and the Lost: Missing Pieces mobisodes in late November 2007. The scene was filmed with stunt double Jake Kilfoyle at the Looking Glass set that was previously used for the third season episodes titled "Greatest Hits" and "Through the Looking Glass".

Most Lost episodes feature crossovers and "Easter eggs"—intentionally hidden clues and references to the show's mythology—and "The Beginning of the End" is no exception. Despite being dead, Christian appears for a couple of seconds in Jacob's cabin with no dialogue. Big Mike, who appears in Ana Lucia's flashbacks in the second-season episode "Collision", returns in Hurley's flashforward. Randy Nations (Billy Ray Gallion) appears in a few seconds with no dialogue, videotaping Hurley's arrest. When Hurley hallucinates that Charlie is swimming outside the interrogation room, Charlie has "they need you" written on his hand. This is what Charlie tells Hurley later in the episode.

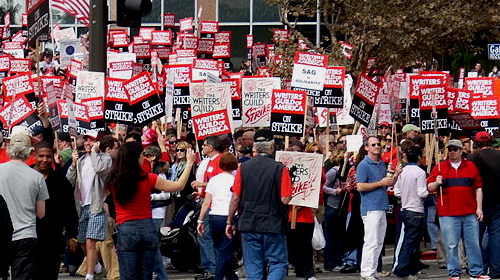
The writers' strike caused a change in scheduling for Lost.

Due to production of the fourth season being put on hold due to the 2007–2008 Writers Guild of America strike, the show runners wanted to hold the eight episodes that had been completed until they were able to make more of the season. ABC decided against this and announced that "The Beginning of the End" would be aired at the end of January 2008, regardless of when the strike was to end. This was the first Lost episode to be aired on Thursday at 9:00 pm ET, a competitive and prestigious timeslot normally occupied by Grey's Anatomy; previous episodes had been aired on Wednesdays. Like the previous Lost season premieres, "The Beginning of the End" was scheduled for an outdoor premiere at Sunset on the Beach in Waikiki, Honolulu, where movies are regularly shown on a 30-foot (9 m) screen free to the public, but it was cancelled due to the writers' strike. The original television broadcast of the episode was immediately preceded by a clip-show titled "Lost: Past, Present & Future".

== Reception ==
Don Williams of BuddyTV dubbed "The Beginning of the End" "the most anticipated season premiere of the year". It was watched by approximately 16.137 million American viewers live or within six hours with a 6.7/17 in the key adults 18–49 demographic, bringing in the best Nielsen ratings for Lost in seventeen episodes and ranking Lost eighth in the weekly charts. The episode was watched by a total of 17.766 million viewers live or recorded and watched within seven days of broadcast and this number went toward the year-end average. In Canada, "The Beginning of the End" was seen by 1.855 million viewers, making Lost the sixth most watched program of the week. It brought in an audience almost double the size of that of the previous episode and greater than any third-season episode, with the exception of the season premiere. The fourth-season premiere was successful in the United Kingdom with 1.1 million viewers. In Australia, Lost was the fifteenth most watched show of the night with 912 000 viewers, which was deemed disappointing by David Dale of The Sun-Herald.

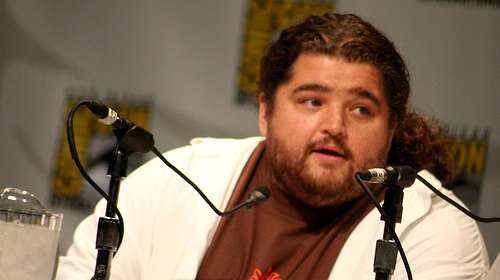
E! commended Garcia's performance as "better than ever".

American critics were sent screener DVDs of "The Beginning of the End" and "Confirmed Dead" on January 28, 2008. Metacritic gave the episode a Metascore—a weighted average based on the impressions of a select twelve critical reviews—of 87. Robert Bianco of USA Today wrote that "returning with a heart-stopping, perfectly pitched episode ... Lost is an oasis in a strike-parched TV desert." Mary McNamara of the Los Angeles Times described "The Beginning of the End" as an "emotion-churning chemical dump right in the old brain stem—horror, hysteria, regret, adrenaline and what ... will happen next?" Adam Buckman of the New York Post gave the episode four out of four stars. Maureen Ryan of the Chicago Tribune "blissfully enjoyed every minute" and noted that "there aren't any faults". Diane Werts of Newsday raved the episode as "superb" and "insanely entertain[ing]" and concluded her review with "Lost seems to have found itself". Tim Goodman of the San Francisco Chronicle declared that it and "Confirmed Dead" "are roller coasters of fast action and revelation [that are] good to see". Matthew Gilbert of The Boston Globe pointed out that "Lost can still make the pulse race and the brain tingle ... [and] remains TV's most gripping serial". Alan Sepinwall of The Star-Ledger was unsure "if Lost is ever going to give satisfying answers to its many, many remaining mysteries ... but when it's as scary and hilarious and moving and exciting as these two episodes, I'm okay with that." In less positive reviews, Rodney Ho of The Atlanta Journal-Constitution called it "a satisfactory return episode with a fair share of drama and pathos ... [that] provides just enough revelations to keep fans hungry for more" and David Hinckley of the Daily News rated the episode with three stars out of a possible five.

Brian Lowry of Variety said that "Lost's return goes down like a welcome tonic as scripted TV fades to black ... providing an unusually generous array of juicy moments for the large (and, at times, neglected) cast." Mark Medley of the National Post called it "a brilliant season premiere" with multiple "jaw-dropping moments". Jeff Jensen of Entertainment Weekly felt that the premiere was mind-blowing and featured good acting by Garcia. Frazier Moore of the Associated Press wrote that "Lost is further upping the ante, and heightening the pressure on us as the show's vast mythology continues to metastasize." Kristin Dos Santos of E! called it "so well written, produced, acted and directed it felt like a movie". Michael Ausiello of TV Guide described it as "easily one of the best hours of TV so far this season." Bruce Fretts of TV Guide responded well to Reddick's performance. Chris Carabott of IGN gave the episode 9.1/10, stating that it was "a great start to what promises to be an exciting ... season 4. The momentum and pacing is on par with last season's finale". LTG of Television Without Pity graded it as an "A−". Jon Lachonis of UGO gave the episode an "A+", calling it "a crushingly emotional, action packed introduction ... [which proves] that ... Lost's groundbreaking protean form still has plenty of blinding ways to dazzle and entertain in a way that is nonetheless unique unto itself." Oscar Dahl of BuddyTV wrote that "the episode was pretty much a masterpiece". Daniel of TMZ graded it as an "A", saying that it was perfect and set up the rest of the season well.
