= Private Number =

A private number is a telephone number not listed in directories.

Private Number may refer to:

- Private Number (1936 film), a 1936 American drama film starring Loretta Young
- Private Number (2014 film), a 2014 American horror film
- "Private Number" (The Jets song), a 1986 song by The Jets
- "Private Number" (Judy Clay and William Bell song), a 1968 song by William Bell, later covered by 911
