= John Livingston (actor) =

American actor

John Livingston is an actor and the brother of actor Ron Livingston. He is best known for playing Rand in the 2003 Sundance-winning movie Dopamine, Matt 'Bunz' Bernstein in The Sterling Chase (1999), and Walter, a love interest for Ellen DeGeneres in her 1996 movie Mr. Wrong, along with a wide variety of TV roles and other movie roles.

== Career ==
His first acting job was as an urchin in the Cedar Rapids Community Theater production of Scrooge.

He was music director for the Stanford Mendicants in 1992, an a Capella troupe of undergraduates.

Best known for playing Walter, a love interest for Ellen DeGeneres in her movie Mr. Wrong (1996), and for starring in the Sundance award-winning movie Dopamine (2003). Other movie roles include portraying Charley Harling in My Antonia (1995), Doug in The Hungover Games (2014), and Sam Patterson in Amelia 2.0 (2017), based on the play The Summerland Project. He also appeared in The Net (1995), Friends 'Til The End (1996), and EDtv (1999), reteaming with DeGeneres in a similar role as in Mr. Wrong. He starred as "Matt 'Bunz' Bernstein" in The Sterling Chase (1999).

His TV roles include a regular role on the short-lived CBS sitcom Love & Money and guest-starring and recurring parts in Murder, She Wrote, Crossing Jordan, The Closer, Bones, JAG, NCIS, NCIS: New Orleans, CSI, Chicago Hope, and Clueless. His first television role was playing Todd in an episode of Saved by the Bell: The New Class in 1994. He also appeared in TV movies like Betrayed: A Story of Three Women (1995), as Charlie Nelson; Ice (2001); and The Long Shot (2004), as Ross Garrett. He played Seth in CBS Schoolbreak Special.

== Personal life ==
He has been married to Jenni Blong since 2006. He is the brother of Ron Livingston and brother-in-law of Rosemarie DeWitt. Livingston was born in Cedar Rapids, Iowa, to Kurt Livingston, an aerospace/electronics engineer, and Linda (née Rinas), a Lutheran pastor. He attended high school in Marion, Iowa and went on to graduate from Stanford in 1993 with a degree in psychology. His sister, Jennifer Livingston, and brother-in-law, Mike Thompson, were TV news personalities at WKBT-DT in La Crosse, Wisconsin.
