= Devon Odessa =

American film and television actress

- Born: 1973 or 1974 (age 52–53); Parkersburg, West Virginia, U.S.
- Occupations: Film and television actress

Devon Odessa Young (born 1973/1974) is an American film and television actress. She is best known for playing Sharon Cherski in the American teen drama television series My So-Called Life.

== Life and career ==
Odessa was born in Parkersburg, West Virginia. She began her screen career in 1985, appearing in the Superstation WTBS sitcom television series Rocky Road. In 1987, she appeared in the NBC fantasy drama television series Highway to Heaven.

Later in her career, in 1994, Odessa starred as Sharon Cherski in the ABC teen drama television series My So-Called Life, starring along with Claire Danes, Bess Armstrong, Wilson Cruz, Devon Gummersall, Jared Leto and A. J. Langer. After the series ended in 1995, she appeared in the short film Shoot the Moon. She guest-starred in television programs including The Facts of Life, Full House, Step by Step, Touched by an Angel and Private Practice, and played the recurring role of Debbie Barnhill in the final season of the syndicated sitcom television series Small Wonder. She also appeared in films such as Uncle Buck, The Omega Code, The Sterling Chase, Mad Cowgirl and Nowhere.

In 2026, Odessa played the recurring role of Bunny in the second season of the Apple TV mystery drama television series Sugar.

== Personal life ==
According to The Kalamazoo Gazette, Odessa lived in Toluca Lake, Los Angeles with her mother in 1994.
