= Friends 'Til the End =

- Genre: Drama; Thriller
- Written by: Kathleen Rowell; Grace Felini
- Directed by: Jack Bender
- Starring: Shannen Doherty; Jennifer Blanc
- Music by: Christophe Beck
- Original language: English

Production
- Executive producers: Tana Nugent Jamieson; Bonnie Raskin
- Cinematography: Edward J. Pei
- Editor: Mark Melnick
- Running time: 120 min.
- Production companies: Bonnie Raskin Productions; NBC Studios

Original release
- Network: NBC
- Release: January 20, 1997

Friends 'Til the End is a 1997 television film directed by Jack Bender. It was originally broadcast January 20, 1997, on NBC.

== Plot ==
Heather Romley (Shannen Doherty) and Suzanne Boxer (Jennifer Blanc) are both singers who have been competing against each other as long as they can remember. Usually, however, the more talented Heather won all the competitions, which resulted in Suzanne being insecure, going insane, and carrying a grudge against Heather, while being pushed by her stage mother.

Years later, Heather enrolls in college and hooks up with a boyfriend, Simon (Jason London). Suzanne, now using the alias of Zanne Armstrong, also enrolls in the same university, with the intention of destroying Heather's life. In the course of this insane evil revenge scheme, she becomes apparent best friends with Heather. But meanwhile, she is evilly destroying all Heather's friendships, and she even successfully seduces Simon himself. Heather is now being threatened with expulsion from college for plagiarism and is kicked out of her own band, with Zanne taking her place. Heather wants to take down Zanne, and sets out, with assistance, to prove Zanne's true identity—specifically, that "Zanne Armstrong's" real name is Suzanne Boxer, and that she is insane and indeed evil.

== Cast ==
- Shannen Doherty as Heather Romley
- Jennifer Blanc as Zanne Armstrong/Suzanne Boxer
- Jason London as Simon
- Harriet Sansom Harris as Mrs. Boxer
- John Livingston as Nick
- Marisol Nichols as Alison
- Gregory Itzin as Mr. Romley
- Christine Healy as Mrs. Romley
- Nicole Bilderback as Paige
- Steven Martini as Bryan
- Jenna Leigh Green as Risa
- Harry J. Lennix as Prof. Gunderson
- Shanna Moakler as Lisa
