= Christopher Jaymes =

American actor

Chris Jaymes
- Born: July 19, 1973 (age 53); Long Beach, California, US
- Occupations: actor, director, screenwriter, producer, musician
- Website: http://www.chrisjaymes.com/

Chris Jaymes (born July 19, 1973) is an American television and film actor, director, screenwriter, producer, and musician.

== Early life ==
Jaymes was born in Long Beach, California and spent his early years in Huntington Beach as an only child. In his early teens, while working at a SCUBA shop as a Rescue Diver, he started having success as an amateur skateboarder which led him into the entertainment industry where he started working as an actor. He went on to attend Berklee College of Music studying piano and orchestration and toured with a number of artists, including Bootstraps and Wanda Jackson, as a piano player.

== Career ==
Jaymes entered the entertainment industry at the age of 17, getting a guest starring role in the hit show, Wings, which ended up getting cut out and rewritten prior to getting shot. Shortly, thereafter, he was cast starring opposite Helen Hunt in the CBS movie-of-the-week Murder in New Hampshire: The Pamela Wojas Smart Story and he then went on to appear on a number of other television shows including Lost, Party of Five, Chicago Hope and numerous others. He played in a number of films as well including Ivan Reitman's Father's Day starring Robin Williams and Billy Crystal.

By 2000, he had directed a number of short films including The Reel and worked as a script supervisor, editor and screenwriter until he starred and co-produced the feature film It's Alright Ma, I'm Only Trying. After which, he directed his first feature film In Memory of My Father where he starred alongside Jeremy Sisto and Judy Greer, as well as, produced, wrote, directed and edited the film which went on to receive critical acclaim and win a number of awards internationally, including the 2006 American Spirit/Best Feature Award at the Santa Barbara International Film Festival, the Grand Jury Award at CineVegas, Best Debut Feature at Sonoma Valley Film Festival and Best Director at the San Diego Film Festival.

Over the next years, Jaymes worked with numerous companies in development, including Signature Pictures, ghostwriting on numerous films, while also consulting through production and post.

In MySpace's heyday, Jaymes was hired as a content producer, to help stimulate and develop MySpace's homepage into a hub for video content, producing spots featuring artists and events, such as the Beastie Boys, Wyclef Jean, Colbie Caillat, Sundance, the Toronto International Film Festival, and many others. Concurrently, Jaymes produced and directed a number of commercials and web campaigns for companies such as Intel, Harper/Collins, Nikki Six, and LiveBooks.com, while also focusing his efforts on a myriad of Non-Profit Organizations, including One Generation and Island Dolphin Care.

Jaymes published a book, entitled Boxing Day about his experiences working in the 2004 tsunami disaster relief efforts

In 2010, Chris Jaymes co-wrote and directed Making A Scene starring William Shatner, Dave Foley, and Jason Priestley, a one-hour comedy for television, which led to a string of shows for the CBC including Long Story Short a scripted comedy with Martin Short starring Robin Duke, Anne Murray, and Norman Jewison, and two pilots, including Late Night with Lang & O'Leary, and an entertainment news show, The Feed.

In 2011, he directed the feature-length thriller, The Cottage starring David Arquette, Kristen Dalton, and Lorraine Nicholson, while also working with Levendis Entertainment and Nick Lambrou, developing the screenplay for the feature film action epic, Sons of Chaos, surrounding the Greek War for Independence.

In 2012, Jaymes was brought on as a producer for a Travel Channel show starring David Arquette, while also directing a series for FOX/Netflix entitled Bad Samaritans with Andy Dick and Julianna Guill.

Beginning in 2012, Jaymes began working with the non-profit organization Island Dolphin Care, a facility where children with brain disorders and war veterans with PTSD, receive progressive therapy treatments working alongside bottlenose dolphins. His research and footage of IDC dolphins combined with news anchor Kerry Sanders’ (NBC) reporting, won the 2014 Michael Debakey Journalism Award, recognizing outstanding journalism that highlights the role of biomedical research that includes the humane and responsible use of animal models in recent medical discoveries and scientific breakthroughs. The story was about a dolphin named Sara who underwent an expansion of a somewhat collapsed airway; a procedure carried out by a group of specialists from across the country, that had never been executed on a dolphin, and the surgery was a success.

During this period, Jaymes also worked closely with Jordan Beckett on various writing projects and participated as the piano player in the band Bootstraps, which was signed briefly to Capitol Records Harvest Label. Jaymes toured with the band in 2013 and is featured on the 2014 Live at Pulse Studios videos and recordings playing piano and keyboards on the tracks "Haywire", "Oh, Ca", "Sleeping Giants" and "Guiltfree". That same year, Bootstraps songs were featured in numerous films and shows, including the band's remake of Whitney Houston's "I Wanna Dance With Somebody" which was featured in Grey's Anatomy, Supergirl, and in ads for the Venice Film Festival.

Jaymes's screenplay Unconditional based on Joe Hoagland and the story that inspired the inception of Island Dolphin Care was recognized as a 2016 Semi-Finalist in the Academy of Motion Picture Arts & Sciences Nicholl Fellowship.

In 2018, Jaymes directed Cartel Pictures thriller Their Killer Affair for Lifetime starring Melissa Archer produced by Eric Scott Woods and Stan Spry. In 2021, Jaymes teamed up with Cartel Pictures to direct another thriller for Lifetime entitled Recipe for Abduction and again in 2022 for Dancer in Danger.

In 2019, after eight years of development, Sons of Chaos, a historical fictionalized retelling of the Greek Revolution of 1821 was published globally as a hardbound, 192 page, oversized graphic novel, by IDW and Penguin Random House. Jaymes wrote and created the book with Ale Aragon doing the artwork.

During the pandemic years, 2020 and 2021 Jaymes was amongst the first 20 volunteers to join Sean Penn's non-profit CORE - Community Organized Relief Effort, working to create the solutions that would become the backbone for the implementation and management of Covid-19 test sites, and eventually vaccination sites across the country.

In 2021, the release of the Greek Edition, entitled 1821:Children of the Revolution was published by Kaktos Publishing throughout all Greek territories and Cyprus.

In 2022, Jaymes returned as an actor in the CBS reboot of Magnum P.I. (2018 TV series) as Bryan, a recovered alcoholic trying to make his life right, as well as, starring in Constellations the award-winning two-hander play by British playwright Nick Payne directed by Kevin Keaveney.

In December 2022, Jaymes was honored by the Parnassos Literary Society, the oldest literary society in Greece founded in 1865, with a Medal of Freedom, for his efforts to keep the 'spirit of Greek values alive'.

In 2023, Chris wrote, produced, directed, and hosted the unscripted culture-driven travel show Midlife Departure, shot in Messolonghi, Greece about a middle aged American man (Jaymes) searching to understand what it means to come from a culture with such immense tradition and history, as he is immersed within the charm of small town Greece.

In 2024, Chris portrayed English Astronaut Nick Jennings on season 4 of the Apple+ show For All Mankind.

On stage, in January 2025, Chris starred in the Irish 2-hander, The Saviour by playwright Deirdre Kinahan directed by Ron Heller at the Manoa Valley Theater.

On television, in 2025 Jaymes is Lug Nut in multiple episodes of Law & Order: Organized Crime with Christopher Meloni, and Captain Rory in the John Wells show Rescue: HI-Surf.

Jaymes plays Dennis King in the 2025 film, Deliver Me from Nowhere, directed by Scott Cooper about Bruce Springsteen's Nebraska (album) starring Jeremy Allen White and Jeremy Strong.

In September 2025, Jaymes played Dr. Richard Feynman, the lead character in the world premiere of the play One in Twenty-Five, written by Tom Copeland, at the Theater for the New City, NYC.

Throughout Spring and Summer 2026, Chris appeared in numerous back to back off and off-off Broadway plays including playing the lead character in La MaMa Experimental Theatre Club's Production of The Censorship of Dreams, written by Nora Sørena Casey and directed by Arthur Makaryan, followed by the lead in the World Premiere of Paul Kubicki's Portraits of Gays in Despair at HB Playwrights Theater NYC. Immediately followed by the World Premiere of Sebastian Bader's Sideshow by the Seashore in July 2026 at The Chain NYC and then he stepped in to the lead role in Mike Backes' The Last Stop at the Gene Frankel, which was selected as the BEST PLAY for their Summer Season. He also starred in the 2-hander at the 28th Street Theater SPARK Theater Festival entitled A Straight line is Just a Circle that Gave Up written by Brian S. Brijbag.

On July 4, 2026, a fully immersive 360 degree film, The Amazon: River of Doubt starring Michael Chernus as Theodore Roosevelt and Chris Jaymes as George Kruck Cherrie premiered at the opening of the Theodore Roosevelt Presidential Library in Medora, North Dakota. The experience uses interactive media and projection mapping to let visitors virtually navigate Roosevelt's perilous 1914 Amazon expedition.

== Film, Television, Theater & Books ==
=== Television ===
- Rescue: HI-Surf (Season 1, 2025) - actor
- Law & Order: Organized Crime (Season 5, 2025) - actor, multiple episodes
- Midlife Departure (pilot) (1 episode, 2024) - actor, writer, director
- For All Mankind (TV series) (Season 4, 2023) – actor
- Magnum P.I. (1 episode, 2022) Sleep With the Fishes – actor
- The Millionaire (1 episode, 2013) – director
- Bad Samaritans (1 episode, 2012) – director
- Mile High (pilot) (1 episode, 2012) – producer
- Long Story Short (1 episode, 2011) – director
- Late Night With Lang & O'Leary (1 episode, 2011) – director, producer
- The Feed (Canadian TV series) (1 episode, 2011) – director, producer
- Making a Scene (1 episode, 2010) – writer/director
- Lost (episode "LaFleur", 2009) – actor
- The Fugitive (1 episode, 2000) – actor
- Chicago Hope (1 episode, 1999) – actor
- NYPD Blue (1 episode, 1999) – actor
- Vengeance Unlimited (1 episode, 1998) -actor
- Profiler (1 episode, 1998 – actor
- Party of Five (2 episodes, 1996–1997) – actor
- Touched by an Angel (1 episode, 1997) – actor
- Murder in New Hampshire: The Pamela Wojas Smart Story – actor (1991)
- The Fresh Prince of Bel-Air (1 episode, 1990)

=== Film ===
- The Shepherd (2027) - Actor
- Theodore Roosevelt: River of Doubt (2026) - Actor
- Helene (2026) - Actor
- Springsteen: Deliver Me from Nowhere (2025) - Actor
- See Me (2025) - Actor
- Veiled (2025) - Actor
- Gramercy (2025) - Actor
- Renata (2025) - Actor
- Kevin's List (2025) - Actor
- Stares (2025) - Actor
- Autumn Leaves (2025) - Actor
- Pixelworld (2025) - Actor
- Little Black Holes (2024) - Actor
- Salt the Earth (2022) - Actor
- Dancer in Danger (2022) – Director
- Recipe for Abduction (2021) – Director
- Their Killer Affair (2020) – Director
- The Cottage (2012) – Director, editor
- Misfits (2011) – Actor
- Bhutto (2010) – Cinematography
- Beyond the Mat (2010) – Editor
- In Memory of My Father (2008) – writer, director, producer, editor, actor
- It's Alright Ma, I'm Only Trying (2000) – producer, actor
- Max, 13 (1999) – actor
- Verses (1999) – actor, editor
- The Reel (1999) – writer, director, actor
- Little Savant (1999) – actor
- Some Girl (1998) – actor
- Father's Day (1997) – actor
- Dogs of Wood's Hole (1997) – actor

=== Theater ===
- The Censorship of Dreams (play) - Lead Actor/The Narrator - 2026 World Premiere, La Mama, NYC
- Portrait of Gays in Despair (play) - Lead Actor/Elder Gay - 2026 World Premiere, Playwrights Theater, NYC
- The Last Stop (play) - Lead Actor/Ray - 2026 World Premiere, Gene Frankel Theatre, NYC - WINNER BEST PLAY 2026 GENE FRANKEL SEASON
- Sideshow by the Seashore (play) - Lead Actor/Dean - 2026 World Premiere, The Chain Theatre, NYC
- A Straight Line is Just a Circle that Gave up (play) - Lead/Clive - 2026 World Premiere, 28th Street Theater, NYC
- One in 25 (play) - Lead Actor/Dr. Richard Feynman - 2025 World Premiere, Theater for the New City, NYC
- The Saviour (play) - Lead Actor/Mel - 2025 Manoa Valley Theater
- Zero Sum Game (play) - Lead Actor/David - 2024 The Players, NYC
- Dust of the World (play) - Lead Actor/Role: Peter - 2023 HB Playwright's Lab - HB Playwright's Theater, NY
- Constellations (play) - Lead Actor/Role: Roland - 2022 Hawaiian Premiere - KOA Theater
- Butterflies Are Free (play) - Lead Actor: Role: Don Baker - Matrix Theater, Los Angeles
- Curtains - Lead Actor/Role: Michael - International City Theater, Long Beach
- Three Sisters (play) - Lead Actor/Role: Vershinin - South Coast Repertory Conservatory
- Measure For Measure - Lead Actor/Role: Claudio - South Coast Repertory Conservatory
- Floating Rhoda & the Glue Man - Lead Actor - L.A.C.E Theater, Los Angeles

=== Books ===
- 1821: Ta Paidia tis Epanastasis (Children of the Revolution)(2021) - Kaktos Publishing
- Sons of Chaos (2019) - a graphic novel - Penguin Random House & IDW Publishing (2019)
- Boxing Day (2007) - Bangkok Books, Books Mango

== Awards and nominations ==
=== Awards ===
- The Last Stop (a play by Mike Backes) - NYC World Premiere |
  - Winner: BEST PLAY - Gene Frankel 2026 Season
- Sons of Chaos - Book, Graphic Novel
  - 2022 Medal of Freedom | Parnassos Literary Society - Athens, Greece
- Unconditional - Screenplay
  - 2016 Academy of Motion Picture Arts & Sciences – Nicholl Fellowship Semi-Finalist
- In Memory of My Father
  - 2006 Santa Barbara International Film Festival – Best American Film/American Spirit Award
  - 2006 Sonoma Valley Film Festival – Best Debut Feature
  - 2006 Santa Cruz Film Festival – Director's Award
  - 2005 CineVegas – Grand Jury Award
  - 2005 San Diego Film Festival – Best Director
  - 2005 AOF FEST – Best Picture
  - 2005 Ft. Lauderdale International Film Festival – Spirit Award
  - 2006 Lake Forest Film Fest – Grand Jury Award

=== Nominations ===
- In Memory of My Father
  - 2006 Atlanta Film Festival – Best Actor
  - 2006 Marbella International Film Festival – Best Film
  - 2005 NatFilm Copenhagen – Best Feature
  - 2005 Starz Denver Int. Film Fest – Director to Watch – Chris Jaymes
