= The Sterling Chase =

- Directed by: Tanya Fenmore
- Starring: Andrea Ferrell; John Livingston; Irene Ng
- Distributed by: Orb International (United Kingdom)
- Release date: September 17, 1999
- Running time: 95 minutes
- Country: United States
- Language: English

The Sterling Chase, also known as Graduation Week, is a 1999 drama film written and directed by Tanya Fenmore and starring Nicholle Tom, Jack Noseworthy, Devon Odessa, Sean Patrick Thomas, Alanna Ubach and John Livingston. The independent film was screened at the Mill Valley Film Festival on September 17, 1999 (see 1999 in film). Screen story was written by Jeremy Dauber, currently an assistant professor at Columbia University. Filming took place on the campuses of Bryn Mawr College and Rosemont College, namely in the Main Building, or Joseph Sinnott Mansion.

== Cast ==
- Andrea Ferrell as Melissa
- John Livingston as Matt 'Bunz' Bernstein
- Irene Ng as Cathy
- Sean Patrick Thomas as Darren
- Jack Noseworthy as Todd
- Devon Odessa as Chris
- Nicholle Tom as Alesis
- Alanna Ubach as Jenna Marino
- Tony Devon as Mr. Marino
