= In Memory of My Father =

American independent film made in 2005

- Directed by: Chris Jaymes
- Written by: Chris Jaymes
- Produced by: Chris Jaymes
- Starring: Judy Greer; Jeremy Sisto; Chris Jaymes; Christine Lakin; Nicholle Tom; Matt Keeslar; Monet Mazur; Pat Healy; Ian Michael Cole
- Cinematography: Abe Levy
- Edited by: Eric Michael Cole; Chris Jaymes
- Music by: Daniel Teper
- Production company: Interspot Film
- Distributed by: Sundance Channel
- Release dates: June 10, 2005 (CineVegas); June 2, 2006 (United States)
- Running time: 96 minutes
- Country: United States
- Language: English

In Memory of My Father is a 2005 American black comedy film written and directed by Chris Jaymes. It stars Jeremy Sisto, Judy Greer, Matt Keeslar, Christine Lakin, Pat Healy, and Jaymes. The film had its world premiere at CineVegas in June 2005 and won the Grand Jury Prize for Best Film. The film was distributed by the Sundance Channel and Scanbox Entertainment.

== Premise ==
Three brothers, Jeremy, Chris, and Matt, come together for the wake of their father, a Robert Evans-type film producer. Before his death, the father bribed youngest son Chris into making a film about his last moments. The wake devolves into a self-obsessed Hollywood party with the arrival of various guests, including Judy, who was the patriarch's young lover and is also having an affair with eldest son Matt, and Meadow, who through familial marriages and re-marriages, is both cousin and stepsister to the brothers.

== Cast ==
- Jeremy Sisto as Jeremy
- Chris Jaymes as Chris
- Matt Keeslar as Matt
- Judy Greer as Judy
- Nicholle Tom as Nicholle
- Eric Michael Cole as Eric
- Monet Mazur as Monet
- Pat Healy as Pat
- Christine Lakin as Christine
- Meadow Sisto as Meadow
- Tom Carroll as Uncle Aled
- Todd Rulapaugh as Todd
- David Austin as Dad

== Production ==
The film was constructed within a three month period from conception to filming. The idea came about when producer David Austin asked Jaymes to write a screenplay for a film they could shoot on location at a mansion once owned by Samuel Goldwyn that he was about to sell. The film was shot in four days. Post-production was completed in Vienna, Austria with the company Interspot Film. The film contains songs from Scottish band Belle & Sebastian.

== Reception ==
On review aggregator Rotten Tomatoes, In Memory of My Father has an approval rating of 67% based on 9 reviews.

Robert Koehler of Variety said the film "eludes the trap of excessive familiarity with an acidic sense of humor and a superbly cast ensemble." He noted "the extended, drug-fueled duo between Sisto and Cole is quite magical, while Greer is allowed to exercise her best comic instincts (especially in tandem with the deadpan Keeslar)", and described the film as a "lighter side of 'The Celebration,' both in terms of its ad-hoc and nervy approach to characters".

Writing in the Las Vegas Weekly, Matthew Scott Hunter said, "In the end, the film is just about bad people behaving badly, and yet it's surprisingly entertaining. The frequently hilarious dialogue has a loose, improvisational feel that makes the entire movie seem far more realistic than it is, and Jaymes' tight direction and constant intercutting of scenes moves the film along at a brisk pace. The performances are great all around, particularly the drugged-out antics of Jeremy and Eric (Eric Michael Cole). It may not be the most profound or realistic film, but it's a hell of a lot more fun than you'd expect from watching despicable people at a funeral."

== Awards ==
=== Wins ===
- 2006 Santa Barbara International Film Festival – Best American Film/American Spirit Award
- 2006 Sonoma Valley Film Festival – Best Debut Feature
- 2006 Santa Cruz Film Festival – Director's Award
- 2005 CineVegas – Grand Jury Award
- 2005 San Diego Film Festival – Best Director
- 2005 AOF FEST – Best Picture
- 2005 Ft. Lauderdale International Film Festival – Spirit Award
- 2006 Lake Forest Film Fest – Grand Jury Award

=== Nominations ===
- 2006 Atlanta Film Festival – Best Actor
- 2006 Marbella International Film Festival – Best Film
- 2005 NatFilm Copenhagen – Best Feature
- 2005 Starz Denver International Film Festival – Director to Watch – Chris Jaymes
