= Black Knight (film) =

2001 film by Gil Junger

- Theatrical release poster
- Directed by: Gil Junger
- Written by: Darryl J. Quarles; Peter Gaulke; Gerry Swallow
- Produced by: Arnon Milchan; Darryl J. Quarles; Michael Green; Paul Schiff
- Starring: Martin Lawrence
- Cinematography: Ueli Steiger
- Edited by: Michael R. Miller
- Music by: Randy Edelman
- Production companies: Regency Enterprises; New Regency; Runteldat Entertainment; The Firm, Inc.
- Distributed by: 20th Century Fox
- Release date: November 21, 2001
- Running time: 95 minutes
- Country: United States
- Language: English
- Budget: $50 million
- Box office: $39.9 million

Black Knight is a 2001 American fantasy adventure buddy comedy film directed by Gil Junger and starring Martin Lawrence with Marsha Thomason, Tom Wilkinson, Vincent Regan, and Kevin Conway in supporting roles. In the film, Lawrence plays Jamal, a present-day theme park employee who is transported through time to medieval England. The film was shot at various locations in North Carolina, mainly Wilmington and Carolina Beach. Black Knight was theatrically released by 20th Century Fox on November 21, 2001, to negative reviews and was a box-office bomb, grossing $39.9 million against a production budget of $50 million.

== Plot ==
Jamal Walker, an employee at Medieval World theme park, is informed that the rival Castle World is opening a location close to theirs, threatening business. His boss, Ms. Bostick, is disappointed at his indifference to the prospect of closing despite its importance to the community. After being tasked with cleaning the moat, he falls into the water after noticing a gleaming medallion. He is dragged out of a lake in a forest by Knolte, a disgraced knight, believing that he is still in present-day Los Angeles. After speaking with Knolte, he visits a nearby village where he is nearly trampled by a group of horseback knights led by Percival, King Leo's bodyguard. He follows Percival and the knights to the castle of King Leo. Jamal is stopped by two guards, but is let in after saying he's from Florence and Normandie.

In the castle's market, Jamal flirts with Victoria, one of King Leo's chambermaids. He is then taken to King Leo, who is awaiting a message from the Duke of Normandy, to whom he is marrying the Princess Regina. Jamal witnesses the beheading of a rebel leader and passes out after realizing the execution was real. He is awakened by Victoria in a bedchamber, who reveals that she is wearing the same medallion, which belongs to members of a rebellion who seek to restore the deposed queen to her throne. Jamal asks her for the date, and Victoria reveals to him that it is the year 1328. During a feast, Jamal inadvertently stops an assassination attempt by the rebels, and King Leo promotes him to head of security to Percival's ire.

Later that night, Princess Regina sneaks into Jamal's bedchamber. Jamal, thinking she's Victoria, sleeps with her. The real messenger arrives, and Jamal's lie is exposed, causing him to be imprisoned in the dungeon and sentenced to death. The failed assassins tell Jamal about the Black Knight, a legendary fire-breathing hero who fought for justice. The next day, Jamal and the two rebels escape the castle with Knolte and Victoria's aid. At the rebel camp, Jamal and Victoria argue over his desire to flee back to Los Angeles. Knolte tells Jamal that he was the former queen's knight, who was disgraced after her deposition, and Jamal resolves to help the rebels overthrow King Leo. Jamal and Knolte arrive back at the rebel camp and find it decimated.

Jamal rallies the rebels and trains them using tactics from American football and pro wrestling. Knolte teaches Jamal some basic sword-fighting manoeuvres and gifts him plate armor. Later that night, Jamal dyes the armor black. The next day, Knolte and the rebels storm the castle, only to be surrounded by Percival and King Leo's army. The rebels are pushed back, but the tides turn when Jamal arrives as the Black Knight, scaring Percival's troops. However, Jamal is knocked off his horse and has his helmet removed.

During the battle, Percival severely wounds Knolte using a longbow and takes Victoria hostage. King Leo begs Percival to take him to safety, but Percival pushes him over the wall, killing him. Jamal confronts Percival, defeating him and knocking him out. Jamal tends to Victoria, but is snuck up on by Percival. Before Percival can attack, he is shot dead by Knolte, causing Percival's troops to break and flee. Jamal is knighted by the queen, whose reign has been restored. During the dubbing, Jamal wakes up at Medieval World, surrounded by his coworkers and EMTs.

Ms. Bostick tells Jamal that she is planning to quit Medieval World, but Jamal convinces her not to. 6 weeks later, Medieval World becomes a hit attraction under Jamal's leadership. At the batting cage, Jamal helps a young boy hit a baseball. A young woman thanks him, and Jamal sees that she looks exactly like Victoria. They experience déjà vu and agree to go on a date. After she leaves, Jamal realizes that he forgot to ask for her number. He chases after her but is pushed back into the moat. Jamal wakes up in the Colosseum of Ancient Rome, where he is chased by a pack of lions, so he runs.

== Cast ==
- Martin Lawrence as Jamal Walker, the Moor, a Medieval World worker who ends up in medieval times.
- Marsha Thomason as:
  - Victoria, a chambermaid.
  - Nicole, a woman in the present day who resembles Victoria.
- Tom Wilkinson as Sir Knolte of Marlborough, a knight who allies with Jamal.
- Kevin Conway as King Leo, a tyrannical king.
- Vincent Regan as Percival, King Leo's bodyguard.
- Daryl Mitchell as Steve
- Michael Countryman as Phillip
- Jeannette Weegar as Princess Regina, the daughter of King Leo.
- Erik Jensen as Derek
- Dikran Tulaine as Dennis
- Helen Carey as The Queen who was overthrown by King Leo.
- Robert Alan Harris as King Leo's Squire
- Richard Fullerton as Will

== Production ==
The film was announced to release on November 21, 2001, by Fox.

== Reception ==
=== Box office ===
The film opened at #4 at the U.S. box office, grossing $11.2 million on its opening weekend, behind Harry Potter and the Sorcerer's Stone, Monsters, Inc. and Spy Game. Black Knight grossed a total of only $39.9 million worldwide during its box office window, despite its $50 million budget, making it a box office bomb.

=== Critical response ===
On the review aggregator website Rotten Tomatoes, 15% of 98 critics' reviews are positive, with an average rating of 3.6/10. The website's consensus reads: "Black Knight feels like a lazily constructed movie, filled with lame gags and constant mugging from Lawrence." Metacritic, which uses a weighted average, assigned the film a score of 32 out of 100, based on 26 critics, indicating "generally unfavorable" reviews. Audiences surveyed by CinemaScore gave the film an average grade of "B−" on an A+ to F scale.

The film has also drawn attention from scholars. Addressing it as one of the few contemporary films that cast African American characters in medieval settings, Laurie A. Finke and Martin B. Shichtman noted that the film provided commentary on early 21st-century race relations in the United States, noting that despite his triumphs in the medieval setting, by the end, Jamal "continues to live in white America, which requires hybridity, not dominance, from African American men. He may be a better man for his excellent medieval adventure, but he is still black, poor, underemployed, and living in the hood.”

== Awards and nominations ==
- Nominated for Golden Reel Award for Best Sound Editing - Music - Feature Film, Domestic and Foreign

== See also ==
- A Spaceman in King Arthur's Court
- A Connecticut Yankee in King Arthur's Court
- A Kid in King Arthur's Court
