= Nicholle Tom =

American actress (born 1978)

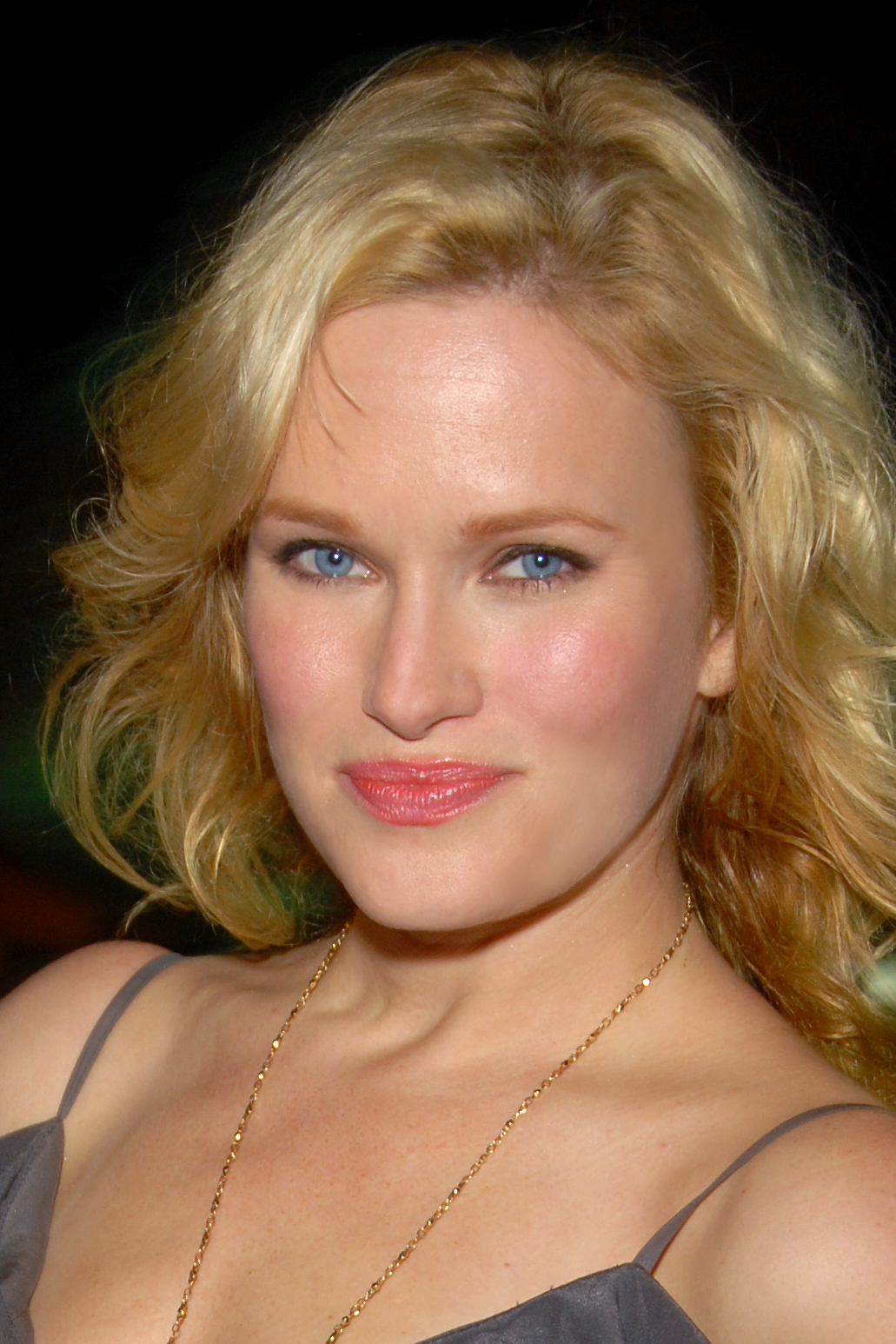
- Tom at the screening of the music video "I'm Gonna Make You Love Me" in 2009
- Born: March 23, 1978 (age 48); Hinsdale, Illinois, U.S.
- Occupation: Actress
- Years active: 1990–present
- Relatives: Heather Tom (sister); David Tom (twin brother)
- Website: castproductions.com/nicholletom.html

Nicholle Tom (born March 23, 1978) is an American actress. She is best known for playing the role of Maggie Sheffield on the CBS sitcom The Nanny (1993–1999). She appeared as Ryce Newton in the film Beethoven (1992), its sequel Beethoven's 2nd (1993), and additionally provided the voice of Ryce for the animated series, Beethoven (1994–1995). She voiced Supergirl in the DC Animated Universe. She also appeared in the role of Tara Wentzel in the sitcom The Minor Accomplishments of Jackie Woodman (2006–2007).

== Early life ==
Tom was born in Hinsdale, Illinois. She is the twin sister of actor David Tom. They have an older sister, Heather Tom who also acts. She guest starred with her brother on an episode of Criminal Minds in 2008. She has guest starred with her sister on The Wedding Bells and Hollywood Darlings. Her siblings worked together on The Young and the Restless and on One Life to Live.

When Tom was eight, her family moved from Chicago to Seattle because her father transferred because of his job. A year later, her mother brought the three children to Los Angeles for pilot season. They moved there permanently, with Tom's father staying in Seattle; her parents soon divorced. Her mother worked as a speech therapist for the Pasadena school system, while the children started their acting careers.

== Career ==
=== 1990–1993: Early work ===
Tom's early credits include Jim Henson's Mother Goose Stories. She made a guest appearance on The Fresh Prince of Bel-Air in 1991. She landed her first big break playing Ryce Newton in the 1992 comedy film Beethoven. She received a Young Artist Award nomination for her role in the film.

Tom took on a dramatic recurring role, playing troubled teen Sue Scanlon on Beverly Hills, 90210. She reprised her role as Ryce Newton for the film Beethoven's 2nd in 1993. She received another Young Artist Award nomination for the sequel. Tom also voiced the character of Ryce for the Beethoven animated series. She played Jacy Woodman in the NBC mini-series Bloodlines: Murder in the Family in 1993.

She was cast as Maggie Sheffield, the elder daughter of Maxwell Sheffield (Charles Shaughnessy), on the CBS sitcom The Nanny, playing the role from 1993 until the show's cancellation in 1999. She received four Young Artist Award nominations for her role on the show.

=== 1994–1998: Other roles ===
Tom starred in Season of Change, a World War II era drama, in 1994. In 1996, She played the daughter of Mel Harris in What Kind of Mother Are You? She played a teen seduced by an older man (Gary Cole) in For My Daughter's Honor (also titled Indecent Seduction) in 1996. Tom co-starred with Brian Austin Green in Unwed Father in 1997. On stage, she starred as Daisy in a production of Biloxi Blues in 1996, alternating playing the role with her sister, Heather Tom. The play, which was produced by her sister and actor Chad Allen, won five Drama-Logue Awards. In 1998, Nicholle Tom played Delphi B. on the sci-fi series Welcome to Paradox. She received a Young Artist Award nomination for her role on the series.

She voiced Supergirl in The New Batman Adventures (1998) and also Superman: The Animated Series (1998-2000). Tom voiced the role of Kara Kent / Supergirl for the Justice League: Alien Invasion 3D dark ride at Warner Bros. Movie World in Australia as well as the seven Justice League: Battle for Metropolis dark rides across Six Flags theme parks in the United States and Mexico.

=== 1999–2006: Theater and film ===
Tom played Alexis in the 1999 drama film The Sterling Chase. She played Tracy in the 2000 film Panic. She starred in the Fox Family Channel movie Ice Angel, playing Sarah Bryan, a female figure skater who has been reincarnated from a macho male hockey player. She appeared in the film Rave. Tom played Cassie, a reporter for Teen Scene magazine, in The Princess Diaries.

In October 2000, Tom starred in a production of Rumplestiltskin at the Falcon Theater in Los Angeles. From March to April 2002, she starred in Serious Inquiries Only at the Sidewalk Studio Theater in Toluca Lake. She played the role of Mandy in the play, which was written and directed by D. Paul Thomas. In 2004, Tom played the title role in the CBS movie The Book of Ruth, co-starring with Christine Lahti. She again voiced the role of Supergirl on Justice League Unlimited (2004-2006). She appeared as Nicole in the 2005 comedy film In Memory of My Father. She had a role in the 2006 film Bottoms Up, co-starring with Paris Hilton. Tom played Carla Hodgkiss in the horror film The Strange Case of Dr. Jekyll and Mr. Hyde.

=== 2007–2014: TV roles ===
On television, Tom made guest appearances from 2007-2009 on Burn Notice, Criminal Minds, Cold Case, The Mentalist, Without a Trace, and Mental. She also guest starred on an episode of The Wedding Bells with her sister, Heather Tom. From 2006 to 2007, she had a regular role as Tara Wentzel on the IFC original series The Minor Accomplishments of Jackie Woodman.

Tom starred as Lily Stanler in the 2008 Lifetime movie Her Only Child (also titled Maternal Obsession). She played Romy Webster in the 2009 thriller film Something Evil Comes. She guest starred on an episode of Castle in 2010. She played Lara Darcie in the Lifetime movie My Family's Secret. In 2012, she played Nikki in the comedy film Hang Loose. She starred as Dana Tilly in the 2013 thriller film Fatal Performance. She had a recurring role on the Showtime series Masters of Sex. In 2014, Tom appeared as Katherine in the thriller film Private Number. She co-starred with her sister Heather Tom and Sonia Satra in a national tour of the Off Broadway play Vanities.

=== 2015–present ===
She guest starred on episodes of Stalker, Gotham, and Survivor's Remorse in 2015. She starred as Heather Pearson in the 2016 thriller film I Didn't Kill My Sister (also titled Murder Unresolved). She played Katie in the 2017 romantic comedy film Saturn Returns. She guest starred with her sister, Heather Tom, on an episode of the comedy series Hollywood Darlings, playing exaggerated versions of themselves.

Tom appeared in the 2017 Hallmark Channel film Do I Say I Do? (also titled Before You Say I Do). She had a role in the comedy film F the Prom. She also had a role in the holiday movie Rent-an-Elf in 2018. In 2021, she appeared in the thriller film #Unknown. She competed on the twenty-fourth season of Worst Cooks in America, the show's seventh celebrity edition titled That's So 90s, airing April–May 2022. Tom starred as Vicky White in the true crime film Prisoner of Love.

== Filmography ==
=== Film ===
Year	Title	Role	Notes
1992	Beethoven	Ryce Newton	
1993	Beethoven's 2nd	Ryce Newton	
1994	Season of Change	Sally Mae Parker	
1999	The Sterling Chase	Alexis	
2000	Urban Chaos Theory	The Girl	Short film
2000	Panic	Tracy	
2000	Rave	Sadie	
2001	Robbie's Brother	Andrea	
2001	The Princess Diaries	Teen Reporter Cassie	
2003	A mi amor mi dulce	Chickpea	Short film
2005	In Memory of My Father	Nicole	
2006	Bottoms Up	Penny Dhue	
2006	The Strange Case of Dr. Jekyll and Mr. Hyde	Carla Hodgkiss	
2011	Just Like Her	Ashley Marston	Short film
2012	Hang Loose	Nikki	
2014	Mi corazón	Becca	Short film
2014	Private Number	Katherine Lane	
2014	3's a Couple	Michelle	Also co-producer
2015	Saturn's Return	Katie	
2017	F the Prom	Principal Statszill	
2018	Blink	Irene	Short film Also executive producer
2019	The Scrap County Murders	Sandy	Short film
2021	#Unknown	Katy	
2022	Prisoner of Love	Vicky White	

=== Television ===
Year	Title	Role	Notes
1990	Jim Henson's Mother Goose Stories		
1991	The Fresh Prince of Bel-Air	Zoey	Episode: "The Butler Did It"
1992	Beverly Hills, 90210	Sue Scanlon	4 episodes
1993	Bloodlines: Murder in the Family	Jacy Woodman	Television mini-series
1993–1999	The Nanny	Maggie Sheffield	Main cast 141 episodes
1994	Beethoven	Ryce Newton (voice)	Main cast
1996	For My Daughter's Honor	Amy Dustin	Television film
1996	What Kind of Mother Are You?	Kelly Jameson	Television film
1997	Unwed Father	Melanie Crane	Television film
1998	Welcome to Paradox	Delphi B.	Episode: "The Girl Who Was Plugged In"
1998	The New Batman Adventures	Kara In-Ze / Supergirl (voice)	Episode: "Girls' Night Out"
1998–2000	Superman: The Animated Series	Kara In-Ze / Supergirl (voice)	4 episodes
2000	Ice Angel	Sarah Bryann	Television film
2003	Strong Medicine	Cherie / Sharon / Sharona	Episode: "Love and Let Die"
2004	The Book of Ruth	Ruth	Television film
2004–2006	Justice League Unlimited	Kara In-Ze / Supergirl (voice)	7 episodes
2006	Windfall	Elisa	3 episodes
2006–2007	The Minor Accomplishments of Jackie Woodman	Tara Wentzel	Main cast 16 episodes
2007	The Wedding Bells	Laine Hill	2 episodes
2007	Burn Notice	Melissa Fontenau	Episode: "Loose Ends, Part 1"
2008	Her Only Child	Lily Stanler	Television film
2008	Criminal Minds	Connie Galen	Episode: "Damaged"
2008	Cold Case	Priscilla Chapin	Episode: "Ghost of My Child"
2009	The Mentalist	Marilyn Monroe	Episode: "A Dozen Red Roses"
2009	Without a Trace	Molly Samson	Episode: "Labyrinths"
2009	Mental	Melissa Ranier	Episode: "A Beautiful Delusion"
2009	Something Evil Comes	Romy Webster	Television film
2010	My Family's Secret	Lara Darcie	Television film
2010	Castle	Cindy Mann	Episode: "The Late Shaft"
2011	I Met a Producer and Moved to L.A.	Emily	Unaired pilot
2013	Fatal Performance	Dana Tilly	Television film
2013	Masters of Sex	Maureen	2 episodes
2014	About a Boy	Debby	Episode: "About a Christmas Card"
2015	Stalker	Zoe Parsons	Episode: "My Hero"
2015	Gotham	Miriam Loeb	Episode: "Everyone Has a Cobblepot"
2015	Survivor's Remorse	Hazel-Fay	Episode: "Homebound"
2016	I Didn't Kill My Sister	Heather Pearson	Television film
2017	Hollywood Darlings	Herself	Episode: "The Bev Witch Project"
2017	Do I Say I Do?	Nora	Television film
2018	Rent-an-Elf	Jojo	Television film
2018	Walk the Prank	Anne Shuster	4 episodes
2022	Worst Cooks in America	Self (Contestant)	5 episodes

== Awards and nominations ==
Year	Award	Nominated work	Category	Result	Ref.
1991–1992	Young Artist Award	Beethoven	Best Young Actress Starring in a Motion Picture	Nominated	
1992–1993	Young Artist Award	The Nanny	Youth Actress Leading Role in a Television Series	Nominated	
1992–1993	Young Artist Award	The Nanny	Outstanding Youth Ensemble in a Television Series	Nominated	
1993–1994	Young Artist Award	Beethoven's 2nd	Best Performance by a Youth Ensemble in a Motion Picture	Nominated	
1993–1994	Young Artist Award	The Nanny	Outstanding Youth Ensemble in a Television Series	Nominated	
1994–1995	Young Artist Award	The Nanny	Best Performance by a Young Actress: TV Comedy Series	Nominated	
1999	Young Artist Award	Welcome to Paradox	Best Performance in a TV Drama Series – Guest Starring Young Actress	Nominated	
