= Caffeine (film) =

- Promotional movie poster for the film
- Directed by: John Cosgrove
- Written by: Dean Craig
- Produced by: John Cosgrove; Jo Levi; Laurence Malkin; Terry Dunn Meurer; David Peters
- Starring: Mena Suvari; Marsha Thomason; Katherine Heigl; Mike Vogel; Breckin Meyer; Mark Pellegrino
- Cinematography: Shawn Maurer
- Edited by: Suzanne Hines
- Music by: David Kitay
- Distributed by: First Look Home Entertainment
- Release date: 10 August 2006 (RIIFF)
- Running time: 88 minutes
- Country: United States
- Language: English

Caffeine is a 2006 American comedy film starring Marsha Thomason, Mena Suvari, Breckin Meyer, Katherine Heigl, Mike Vogel, and Mark Pellegrino. It revolves around relationships of the staff and patrons of the quirky Black Cat Cafe in London one day.

== Plot ==
During one lunchtime at an offbeat London coffee house, the relationships of the quirky staff and several couples are suddenly turned upside down by revelations of supremely embarrassing secrets and idiosyncrasies, generally having to do with their rampaging sexual appetites. A neurotic young commitment-phobe runs into his ex-girlfriend while he's whacked out on killer dope. A high strung control freak finds out that her husband-to-be is a transvestite. A shy, hesitant young woman suffers the blind-date-from hell, an obnoxious bore who has been told she sleeps with men on the first date. A hyper-possessive boyfriend discovers that his girlfriend is an ex-porn actress. The manager's boyfriend has a ménage à trois which he says is forgivable because the girls were identical twins. As the craziness builds to hilarious conclusions, Caffeine interweaves these characters' hapless attempts to repair their fractured relationships while they are forced to confront issues of fidelity, betrayal, commitment and forgiveness.

== Cast ==
Actor	Role	Notes
Marsha Thomason	Rachel	Café manager & Charlie's girlfriend
Mena Suvari	Vanessa	Café waitress & Lucy's granddaughter
Callum Blue	Charlie	Café chef & Rachel's cheating boyfriend
Mark Pellegrino	Tom	Café waiter, assistant cook & Dylan's boyfriend
Roz Witt	Lucy	Vanessa's delusional grandmother
Andrew Lee Potts	Mike	Danny's stoner friend
Mike Vogel	Danny	Mike's stoner friend
Breckin Meyer	Dylan	Café waiter, aspiring writer & Tom's boyfriend
Sonya Walger	Gloria	Mark's girlfriend (and ex-adult film performer)
Orlando Seale	Mark	Gloria's jealous boyfriend
Katherine Heigl	Laura	Steve's blind date & Mike's ex-girlfriend
Daz Crawford	Steve	Laura's blind date
Andrew Ableson	John	David's friend (an accused pervert)
Mark Dymond	David	John's friend & Angela's fiancee
Jules Leyser	Angela	David's fiancée
Brian J. Watson		Porn star
Hal Ozsan	Dude	a guitarist
Paula Jane Newman	—	annoying lady customer
Neil Dickson	Mr. Davies	the owner of the Marion

== Reception ==
The review aggregator website Rotten Tomatoes surveyed nine critics and, categorizing the reviews as positive or negative, assessed all nine as negative for a 0 percent rating. Among the reviews, it determined an average rating of 3.20 out of 10.
