= Ice Angel =

2000 US-Canadian fantasy film

- Written by: Phil Valentine; Rob Kerchner; Scott Sandin
- Directed by: George Erschbamer
- Starring: Nicholle Tom; Tara Lipinski; Nancy Kerrigan; Thomas Calabro
- Countries of origin: Canada; United States
- Original language: English

Production
- Running time: 99 minutes
- Production companies: Saban Entertainment; Shavick Entertainment; Fox Family Films

Original release
- Network: Fox Family Channel
- Release: March 5, 2000

Ice Angel is a 2000 fantasy film from Fox Family. It is also known as On Thin Ice: Going for the Gold.

== Plot ==
The film tells the story of Matt Clark (Aaron Smolinski), a male hockey player who dies in a game due to an accident caused by the angel Allan, (Brendan Beiser) that caused the hockey player to die when he was trying to get to a choking man. As four days have passed where Matt has been pronounced dead, cremated and buried on national television, Allan is instructed by his boss Peter (Alec Willows) to put Matt in a suitable body. Matt comes back to life as Sara Bryan (Nicholle Tom), a female figure skater who fell into a coma who just passed into Heaven. Both share the dream of competing in the Winter Olympics. The male hockey player specified that if he returned to earth, he wanted to have a chance to win an Olympic Gold medal on ice, leaving the detail that he wanted to be on the hockey team implied. With time running short, Matt in Sara's body has to get skating lessons from Sara's one-time rival (Tara Lipinski) if he wishes to earn gold.

== Cast ==
- Nicholle Tom as Sara Bryan
- Tara Lipinski as Tracy Hannibal
- Nancy Kerrigan as Julie
- Jud Tylor as Danielle
- Aaron Smolinski as Matt Clark
- Gwynyth Walsh as Mrs. Bryan
- Thomas Calabro as Ray Rossovich
- Alan Thicke as Coach Parker
- Brendan Beiser as Allan
- Andrew Johnston as Mr. Bryan
- Alec Willows as Peter
- Elvis Stojko as Doug
