= LaFleur (Lost) =

- Lost episode
- James "Sawyer" Ford grabs his DHARMA uniform.
- Episode no.: Season 5 Episode 8
- Directed by: Mark Goldman
- Written by: Elizabeth Sarnoff; Kyle Pennington
- Production code: 508
- Original air date: March 4, 2009
- Running time: 42 minutes

Guest appearances
- Nestor Carbonell as Richard Alpert; Doug Hutchison as Horace Goodspeed; Reiko Aylesworth as Amy; Christopher Jaymes as Doctor; Kevin Rankin as Jerry; Patrick Fischler as Phil; Molly McGivern as Rosie; Carla Buscaglia as Heather; John Skinner as Other

Episode chronology
← Previous "The Life and Death of Jeremy Bentham"	Next → "Namaste"
- Lost season 5

"LaFleur" is the eighth television episode of the fifth season of ABC's Lost. The 94th episode of the show overall, "LaFleur" aired on March 4, 2009, on ABC in the United States, being simulcast on A in Canada. The episode was written by co-executive producers Elizabeth Sarnoff and Kyle Pennington and directed by editor Mark Goldman.

Having lost Charlotte Lewis in the time flashes, James "Sawyer" Ford, Juliet Burke, Miles Straume, Jin-Soo Kwon and Daniel Faraday realize the time flashes have stopped, and they find themselves in 1974. Sawyer then perpetuates a lie to the DHARMA Initiative to protect themselves from mistakes of the past.

== Plot ==
On the island, after John Locke (Terry O'Quinn) falls into the chamber with the wheel during a time jump, (Note: As depicted in This Place is Death.) the survivors — James "Sawyer" Ford (Josh Holloway), Juliet Burke (Elizabeth Mitchell), Miles Straume (Ken Leung), Daniel Faraday (Jeremy Davies) and Jin-Soo Kwon (Daniel Dae Kim) briefly arrive to a time when there is an ancient statue standing on the island. (Note: The remnants of the statue are seen in Live Together, Die Alone.) After Locke turns the wheel, the survivors arrive to 1974, at the peak of the Dharma Initiative's presence on the island. Now that John has pushed the wheel, the time jumps have stopped and they are stuck in the past. The group comes across a pair of Dharma Initiative members who have been captured by two of the island's native inhabitants, known as the Others. Juliet and Sawyer kill the Others and free Amy (Reiko Aylesworth), but her husband Paul (Casey Byrnes) has been killed. The group returns to the barracks, where Amy resides. However, she tricks them into walking through the sonic fence which surrounds the barracks, knocking them unconscious.

Sawyer wakes up and is confronted by Horace Goodspeed (Doug Hutchison), the leader of the Dharma Initiative on the island. Sawyer tells him that his name is James LaFleur and that he and the other survivors were part of a shipwreck on the island, and that they are still looking for other members of their crew. Horace tells him that they will have to leave the next day on the submarine because they are not "Dharma material". Meanwhile, Daniel sees Charlotte Lewis (Rebecca Mader) as a young girl, but decides not to say anything to her. That night, the spokesman of the Others, Richard Alpert (Nestor Carbonell), enters the barracks to determine why his treaty with Dharma was broken. Sawyer convinces Alpert not to attack Dharma, because he is the one who killed the Others. Alpert is further convinced when Sawyer shares knowledge of the events that transpired in 1954 when Locke approached him. (Note: As depicted in Jughead.) Because Sawyer has successfully defused the situation, Horace allows the group to stay for two weeks and look for the other crew members of their ship, when in reality they are waiting for Locke to return with the survivors who left the island.

Three years later, the survivors have joined Dharma and are living in the barracks. Sawyer is the well respected head of security, while Jin (who is now fluent in English) continues to search for those who left the island. Amy is pregnant with Horace's baby and due to give birth in two weeks. Following an argument between them, Horace gets drunk and hurls sticks of dynamite at trees and Amy goes into early labor; Juliet successfully delivers the baby, the first that survived in all her time on the island. Horace believes that Amy is not yet over her deceased husband, however Sawyer reassures him by stating that three years is enough time to get over someone, referring to his relationship with Kate Austen (Evangeline Lilly). Sawyer returns to his home, where he lives with Juliet, with whom he is now in a relationship. The next morning, he receives a call from Jin, who has found Kate, Jack Shephard (Matthew Fox), and Hugo "Hurley" Reyes (Jorge Garcia) in the jungle. (Note: As depicted in 316.) Sawyer secretly meets them far from the barracks, where they are reunited.

== Production ==
In the episode "Confirmed Dead", Charlotte's birthday is said to be July 2, 1979. This led to a minor continuity error in "LaFleur", when Charlotte is depicted as being a young girl in 1974. Executive producers Cuse and Lindelof claimed in a podcast that the original script for "Confirmed Dead" listed Charlotte's birthday as being in 1970 and that Mader had it changed because she did not want people to think she was significantly older than she actually is. This caused a controversy when Mader later stated on her blog that Gregg Nations, the script coordinator, was the one who suggested the change. Cuse and Lindelof later conceded that she was right.

== Reception ==
The episode gained 12.396 million American viewers and 339,000 Australian viewers.

"LaFleur" garnered generally positive reviews from critics. Chris Carabott of IGN gave the episode a positive review, stating "The narrative successfully establishes a new direction for the story from here on out and gives us an exciting, yet familiar, setting for the next few episodes." He also liked the episode's focus on Sawyer, saying "This is a great James Ford episode. It's been a while since we've had an opportunity to see Sawyer's con artist skills put to the test and he definitely delivers this week."
