= Hal Ozsan =

Cypriot screenwriter and actor

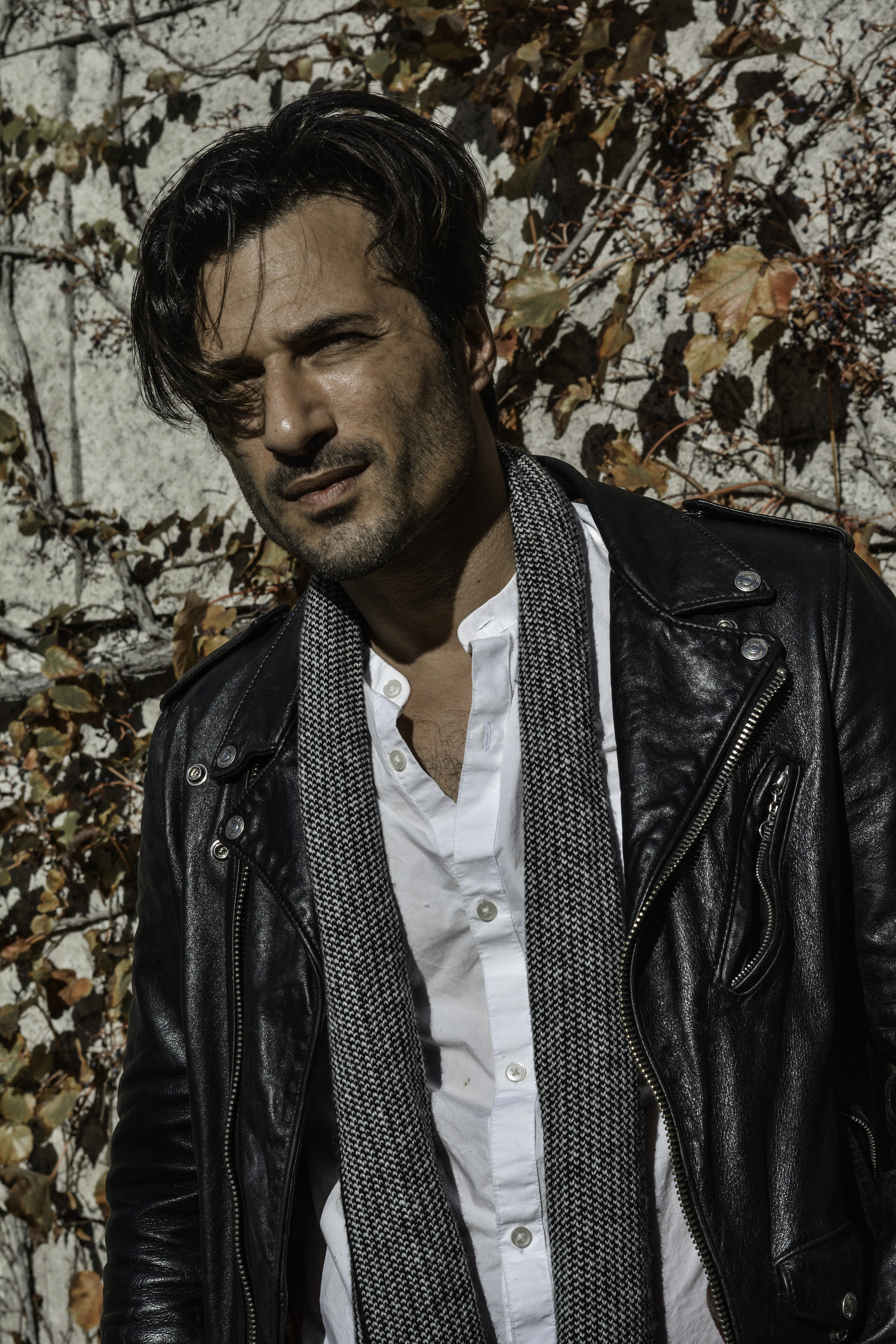
- Ozsan in 2017
- Born: Halil Özşan; 26 October 1976 (age 50); Famagusta, Cyprus
- Citizenship: United States
- Occupations: Actor; musician; screenwriter; producer
- Years active: 2000–present
- Spouses: Ashley Kucich (m. 2020; div. 2021) Sarah Canning (m. 2023)
- Website: www.halozsan.com

Halil Özşan (/ˈoʊzæn/; born 26 October 1976), known professionally as Hal Ozsan, is a Turkish Cypriot screenwriter and actor. As an actor, he came to prominence for his role as Todd Carr in Dawson's Creek. He has gone on to appear in various series regular and recurring roles on shows such as Jessica Jones, NCIS: New Orleans, The Blacklist, Graceland, Impastor, 90210, and Kyle XY.

As a screenwriter and producer, he is known for being co-executive producer and co-writer of the Viceland comedy What Would Diplo Do? starring his Dawson's Creek co-star James Van Der Beek. In 2025 his script 'Alpha' was voted into the top 10 of the Hollywood's The Black List (survey) and became the subject of a multi-studio bidding war, eventually selling to Netflix

As a musician, Ozsan fronted the band Poets and Pornstars as a musician until 2008, with his music featured in such media as Californication and So You Think You Can Dance.

== Early life ==
Ozsan was born to Turkish Cypriot parents in Famagusta, Cyprus. At the age of three, he moved to England with his family and was raised in the London suburb of Havering. At the age of 11, he gained admission to Brentwood School, receiving a distinction for drama.

== Career ==
Ozsan moved to the United States in the 1990s, where he began working in films and television. His first major recognition for a recurring role was as Todd Carr in Dawson's Creek, followed by a main role in the miniseries Fallen and a recurring role in Kyle XY. Ozsan's first film appearance was in the film S1m0ne. He was the singer-songwriter for the rock band Poets and Pornstars; in 2008, he left the band to return to acting full-time. His songs have appeared in several films and television shows, including Californication, So You Think You Can Dance, Little Athens and Undead or Alive. Many other television shows and films were to follow.

In 2017, he became the co-executive producer and co-writer of the critically acclaimed Viceland comedy series What Would Diplo Do?, reuniting with his Dawson's Creek co-star James Van Der Beek.

== Personal life ==
On 16 October 2020, Ozsan eloped with makeup artist and hair stylist Ashley Kucich. Ozsan filed for divorce in 2021.

In July 2023, Ozsan announced that he was engaged to former fashion model Sarah Canning, to whom he proposed at the Mediterrane Film Festival.Ozsan and Canning had been dating since 2022.

They were married on 14 December 2023 in the Marylebone neighborhood of London.

== Filmography ==
Film
Year	Title	Role	Notes
2002	Simone	Hotel concierge	
2004	Helter Skelter	Joey Dimarco	Television film
2005	Guy in Row Five	Billy	
2006	Caffeine	Dude	
2007	Redline	Mike Z	
2007	Children of Wax	Hakan	
2010	Groupie	Travis Bellamy	
2011	The Back-Up Bride	Serge Prozorofsky	also known as Head Over Spurs in Love
2011	Peach Plum Pear	Nils Hutchinson	
2012	For the Love of Money	Abe	
2014	Betrayed	Jonathan	
2014	Layover	Tom	
2014	Private Number	Michael Lane	
2020	Last Moment of Clarity	Vince	
2020	Infidel	Ramzi	

Television
Year	Title	Role	Notes
2000	Felicity	Long-haired guy	Episode: "Revolutions"
2000	Felicity	Student, stoner guy	Episode: "Running Mates"
2000	Jesse	Dawson	Episode: "First Blood"
2001	Providence	Rolando	Episode: "Big Night"
2001	FreakyLinks	Jamie Hallowell	Episode: "Subject: Still I Rise"
2001	Grounded for Life	Jerry	Episode: "You Can't Always Get What You Want"
2001	Nash Bridges	Eric	Episode: "Blood Bots"
2001	Six Feet Under	Man in flower shop	Episode: "Life's Too Short"
2001–2003	Dawson's Creek	Todd Carr	12 episodes
2002	Roswell	Adam Chase	Episode: "Ch-Ch-Changes"
2003	Fastlane	Oliver Jax	Episode: "Dosed"
2003	Dragnet	—N/a	Episode: "The Magic Bullet"
2004	The Division	Sheryl's manager	Episode: "The Box"
2005	CSI: Miami	Brandon Pace	Episode: "Game Over"
2006	CSI: NY	Tony DeLuca	Episode: "Open and Shut"
2007	Fallen	Azazel	Miniseries; 4 episodes
2008	Shark	Donny Garland	Episode: "One Hit Wonder"
2008	Californication	Ronny Praeger	3 episodes
2008	The Unit	Raheem	Episode: "Shadow Riders"
2009	Kyle XY	Michael Cassidy	10 episodes
2009	Without a Trace	Wyatt Brody	Episode: "Skeletons"
2009	Supernatural	Patrick	Episode: "The Curious Case of Dean Winchester"
2010–2011	90210	Miles Cannon	12 episodes
2010	Hawthorne	Dr. Andrew Lee	Episode: "Picture Perfect"
2010	Melissa & Joey	Dylan	Episode: "Boy Toys 'R' Us"
2011	Suits	Jones Debeque	Episode: "Play the Man"
2012	White Collar	Gordon Taylor	Episode: "Stealing Home"
2012	Bones	Jocco Kent	Episode: "The Suit on the Set"
2012	Make It or Break It	Dr. Andrew Walker	2 episodes
2012	Hollywood Heights	Nick Lynch	Episode: "Max Looks for Answers"
2012	Beauty & the Beast	Chris Miller	Episode: "Trapped"
2013	The Mentalist	Harry Clarkson	Episode: "Days of Wine and Roses"
2013	True Blood	King Charles II	Episode: "In the Evening"
2013	Major Crimes	Bruce	Episode: "Poster Boy"
2013	Sons of Anarchy	Kia Ghanezi	Episode: "Straw"
2014	Bad Teacher	Navid	Episode: "Nix the Fat Week"
2014	Hieroglyph	Bek Penroy	Episode: "Pilot"
2014	The Blacklist	Ezra	5 episodes
2015	Young & Hungry	Charles D'Arby	Episode: "Young & Part Two"
2015	Impastor	Kenny Banderas	3 episodes
2015	Graceland	Germaine Marsden	4 episodes
2016	Lucifer	Sergei	1 episode
2016	Code Black	Viktor	Episode: "The Fifth Stage"
2016	The Clan of the Cave Bear	Brun	Pilot
2018	Jessica Jones	Griffin Sinclair	6 episodes
2018	The Resident	Nigel Sutton	1 episode
2018	Deception	Mikhail Koslov	Episode: "Forced Perspective"
2018	Hit the Floor	O'Malik	1 episode
2018	Magnum P.I.	Jack Candler	Episode: "Six Paintings, One Frame"
2019–2020	NCIS: New Orleans	Ryan Porter	7 episodes
2022	The Guardians of Justice	News Anchor Van Dawson	7 episodes

Web
Year	Title	Role	Notes
2011	The Online Gamer	Mark	4 episodes
2011	Level 26: Dark Revelations	Labyrinth / Julian Blair	7 episodes
2012	Cybergeddon	Jessop	Episode: "McCluskey"

Video games
Year	Title	Role	Notes
2013	Killzone: Shadow Fall	Gresham	Voice
