= Mr. Wrong =

1996 film by Nick Castle

- Theatrical release poster
- Directed by: Nick Castle
- Written by: Chris Matheson; Kerry Ehrin; Craig Munson
- Produced by: Marty Katz
- Starring: Ellen DeGeneres; Bill Pullman; Joan Cusack; Dean Stockwell; Joan Plowright
- Cinematography: John Schwartzman
- Edited by: Patrick Kennedy
- Music by: Craig Safan
- Production companies: Touchstone Pictures; Mandeville Films
- Distributed by: Buena Vista Pictures Distribution
- Release date: February 16, 1996
- Running time: 96 minutes
- Country: United States
- Language: English
- Box office: $12.8 million

Mr. Wrong is a 1996 American romantic comedy film starring Ellen DeGeneres in her film debut and Bill Pullman, and produced by Touchstone Pictures and Mandeville Films. It was released on February 16, 1996, by Buena Vista Pictures Distribution. The film's story follows the misadventures of a woman who realizes her fiancé is a mentally disturbed criminal.

Mr. Wrong was a critical failure and box office bomb, being lambasted by critics. DeGeneres used to mention the film occasionally on her talk show, poking fun at the disastrous reception. As of 2026, it remains the only live-action film with DeGeneres in a leading role.

Contrary to the story being about a single, heterosexual woman trying to find love, the film was released one year before DeGeneres publicly came out as a lesbian.

== Plot ==
The film begins with Martha Alston in a wedding gown incarcerated in a Mexican prison. The investigators call her Mrs. Crawford and listen to her explain why she committed murder on her wedding day.

Some months earlier, Martha attends her younger sister's wedding. Afterwards, Martha is pestered by her overbearing parents about when she will get married herself being 31 years old with her biological clock ticking. Martha works as an associate producer for a local TV talk show in San Diego. She rejects an offer of going out on a date with a younger co-worker, named Walter. Disappointed by her dull Valentine's Day blind date, she goes home to sulk in front of the TV, where, inundated by romantic imagery, she is prompted to get out of the house.

Martha goes to a bar where she drops her quarter in front of the jukebox. She bends down to get it when a man shows up and selects the same song she would have chosen. He is Whitman Crawford, and they instantly hit it off. They go back to his house and have sex. He says he's a poet and an investor, and has money. He reads her one of his poems.

Whitman appears charming and charismatic in which he and Martha begin dating. Martha introduces Whitman to her family and he impresses all of them. But by the time she meets his strange and eccentric mother, Martha has become convinced he is not "Mr. Right" at all. After Martha tells Whitman that it is OK to "be himself" around her, he suddenly breaks character and shoplifts a six-pack of beer from a local store and enjoys crushing the empty beer cans on his forehead. It is here that Whitman is revealed to be a crafty, devious, narcissistic sociopath who hides behind a charming nice-guy persona that fools literally everyone he comes into contact with. To make matters worse, Whitman's ex-girlfriend, Inga (who is nearly as crazy and deranged as Whitman), and her accomplice, Bob, begin harassing Martha who decides to break up with Whitman. Inga refuses to believe that Martha has dumped Whitman. Whitman also refuses to believe he has been dumped and he begins stalking Martha and trying to woo her back in increasingly ridiculous ways. Martha soon becomes frustrated and desperate after the manipulative Whitman tells her whole smitten and oblivious family that they are engaged to be married. He even buys off the private investigator whom Martha hires to run a background check on him. All of Martha's attempts to expose Whitman as the dangerous sociopath that he is to her friends and family is met with skepticism or disbelief from everyone due to Whitman's skill at lying and manipulation. Whitman goes as far as to make Martha lose her job, and then hits her with his pickup truck, drugs her and abducts her, taking her to Mexico to marry her there by hiring two young Mexican children to hold her captive as they travel on the road to their destination.

Once in Mexico, Martha attempts to escape and manages to place a phone call to San Diego to her former office to the only person that has not fallen under Whitman's influence: her co-worker Walter whom she manages to hurriedly explain that Whitman has abducted her and to travel to Mexico and rescue her. Whitman then catches up to her and disconnects the call. Inga and Bob appear and attempt to kill Martha, but Whitman comes to Martha's rescue and manages to drive them away at gunpoint.

At the church where Whitman is forcing Martha to get married in front of her deluded family, Walter shows up at the last minute to rescue Martha from the wedding, but trips. His gun falls into her hands and she shoots Whitman who attempts to lunge at her. Then she's arrested, which leads to Martha telling the local authorities her entire story. However, even the Mexican investigators are unsympathetic and conclude that she murdered Whitman intentionally. As they are transporting her away, Walter springs her out of jail with Bob's help and explains that it was Inga who did it; she attempted to shoot Martha from the church balcony, but when Martha tripped, Inga hit Whitman by accident. Walter claims that Whitman is still alive at a local hospital and he will recover from his wound.

After meeting up with Bob in the desert, Martha and Walter ride a horse west towards the sunset, while Bob leaves to return to Inga. Title cards over the closing scene explain that Martha and Walter eventually turned north and returned to the USA where they became romantically involved and currently live under assumed names, Inga and Bob got married and opened a pet store in Albuquerque, and Whitman continues his search for love.

== Cast ==
- Ellen DeGeneres as Martha Alston
- Bill Pullman as Whitman Crawford
- Joan Cusack as Inga Gunther
- Dean Stockwell as Jack Tramonte
- John Livingston as Walter
- Joan Plowright as Mrs. Crawford
- Robert Goulet as Dick Braxton
- Ellen Cleghorne as Jane
- Polly Holliday as Mrs. Alston
- Camille Saviola as Consuela
- Hope Davis as Annie Alston
- Peter White as Mr. Alston
- Briant Wells as Stuart
- Brad William Henke as Bob (as Brad Henke)
- Christine Cattell as Nancy Culpepper
- Maddie Corman as Missy
- Jonathan Hernandez as Self
- Victoria Elena Flores as Nicole (as Victoria Flores)
- Louie Anderson as himself
- Casey Kasem as himself
- Jean Kasem as herself

== Production ==
In January 1995, it was announced Ellen DeGeneres would star in Mr. Wrong for a reported $2.2 million. Some scenes were shot at the Hotel del Coronado near San Diego.

== Reception ==
The film was critically panned, garnering a score of 6% on the review aggregator site Rotten Tomatoes from 31 critics. The critical consensus reads: "A mean-spirited joke without a punchline, Mr. Wrong is so painfully unfunny that Ellen DeGeneres and Bill Pullman's lack of chemistry feels like a total drag despite being the point." Audiences polled by CinemaScore also had a negative response to the film and gave it an average grade of "C−" on an A+ to F scale.

Mick LaSalle, writing for the San Francisco Chronicle, said that after a good start and entertaining first half, the second half of the film became "dreadful" and "inherently unfunny" starting when after Martha breaks up with Whitman after seeing his true evil persona, in which he then begins stalking her and literally destroys her personal and professional life while continuing to fool everyone around her with his charismatic, good-guy facade. Chris Hicks of The Salt Lake Tribune similarly declared Mr. Wrong had an interesting concept and a "few laughs" in the early scenes, but "before the halfway mark, however, all these interesting ideas cease to be funny, and the downhill slide is quite steep."

Rita Kempley, writing for The Washington Post, assessed the film a "sour, listless debunking of romantic comedies, ... [with] fewer laughs than Looking for Mr. Goodbar" and laments that "Ellen DeGeneres, a comedian and sitcom star in her film debut, [who] is ostensibly the protagonist here" does not control the action, but her character "merely reacts to [Whitman's] twists and turn-ons".

James Berardinelli of ReelViews criticized the film's premise, writing, "This is a romantic comedy parody, but how can you satirize something that's a comedy to begin with? If this motion picture is an example, not only can't it be done, but the result is downright ugly." He also questioned DeGeneres' appeal, calling her performance "irritating". On their syndicated review program, Gene Siskel and Roger Ebert gave the film two resounding thumbs down, saying that DeGeneres had an engaging onscreen presence but the pivot to Pullman's obnoxious character was a total disaster that made the movie impossible to enjoy.

Not every critic disparaged the film. Mick Martin and Marsha Porter of the DVD & Video Guide gave it three stars, and while acknowledging that "the script is predictable and Nick Castle's direction is only adequate", they found that "DeGeneres's personal charm and a few inspired gags make it all worthwhile".

DeGeneres has herself joked about the film, saying "I think Mr. Wrong, my very first film which was a horrible flop, that should have a sequel".

=== Box office ===
Mr. Wrong opened on Presidents' Day weekend on February 16, 1996 and debuted at No. 6 with $5,106,797. Its total worldwide gross was $12,825,141.

== See also ==
- List of media set in San Diego
