= Sons of Chaos =

2019 Graphic Novel

Publication information
- Publisher: Penguin Random House and IDW Publishing
- Publication date: July 2019

Creative team
- Written by: Chris Jaymes
- Artist: Ale Aragon
- Colorist: Hi-Fi Design

Collected editions
- Hardcover: ISBN 1684054796

Sons of Chaos is a historically inspired 2019 graphic novel written by Chris Jaymes surrounding the 1821 Greek War for Independence which returned freedom to Greece and initiated the fall of the Ottoman Empire, published by Penguin Random House.

== Summary ==
Sons of Chaos is a fictionalized retelling of the 1821 Greek War of Independence and the events leading up to it from the perspective of Markos Botsaris, the son of the Greek Leader Kitsos Botsaris, and the relationship between Ali Pasha of Ioannina and the Souliotes. The book was developed over 10 years by Chris Jaymes with the support of Nick Lambrou.

== Publication ==
The Penguin Random House/IDW Publishing release consists of 192 double-page cinematic spreads equivalent to two typical-sized comic book pages and premiered in July 2019 at San Diego Comicon. The Greek version was released in November 2020 by Kaktos Publishing after the English version was presented at AthensCon 2019.

== Story Summary ==
The Ottoman Empire held power over Greece for more than 400 years. Ali Pasha of Ioannina, the Sultan's leader in charge of Northern Greece, had been engaged in a forty year conflict with the Souliotes, a small group of Greeks (source?) that fled to the hills of Souli to retain their freedom.

The Souliotes would sooner die than bow down to oppression of the Ottoman Empire. Markos Botsaris, the 12-year-old son of the Souliote Leader Kitsos Botsaris, was raised within this world of chaos, as his home has been under attack since birth, however he was not a naturally skilled warrior.

His father Kitsos receives a letter from Ali Pasha, requesting peace with the Suliotes. Kitsos and his men arrive at Ali's Palace to find that the peace declaration was a ruse and Ali has mounted an attack on the women of children of Souli upon their arrival. The village is rampaged and Marcos watches his mother beheaded at the hands of Ali Pasha's son, Muhktar, and is taken prisoner in Ali's Palace, where he spends the next ten years of his life.

The Ottoman Empire has weakened and Greece is heading towards revolution as Ali's daughter-in law Eleni, helps Marcos escape and instructs him to go to her father Ibrahim Pasha of Berat. In Berat, Eleni's father Ibrahim takes him in and regardless that he is the enemy, works to build Marcos into a leader. While living in Berat, Marcos falls further in love with Eleni who communicates with him through secret letters.

The turmoil of Greece increases and upon Marcos completing his training with Eleni's brother, Ismael, Ibrahim asks for Marcos to go out and muster up support to rise against Ali. In doing so, Marcos heads to Gardiki and reunites with the remaining Greeks and learns that his sister has married his best friend, Photo and is about to have a baby.

Ibrahim learns that Ali is set to attack Gardiki and offers Marcos weapons and munitions to support the attack, however they fail to return soon enough and the Greeks of Gardiki are slaughtered, including his sister. Marcos' anger explodes and he is determined to bring freedom to his people. The Greeks rise and revolt and Marcos leads the way.

Marcos receives a letter from Eleni explaining that she needs him to come to her, that Ali's Palace is under attack and that he must save her. Marcos quickly leaves the battle that he is leading to face Ali Pasha and save the woman he loves.

== Critical response ==
"The layout allows you to take in every gory detail; it almost feels like you're reading the storyboards for an epic film the likes of Ben-Hur or Gladiator. Much thought was clearly put into the presentation of this story, and it shows. The story itself has already drawn comparisons to Game of Thrones, 300, and Les Miserables, and those are all apt comparisons, but Sons of Chaos also feels completely like its own thing unto itself. Jaymes has written a captivating story, with plenty of twists and turns to keep you reading, and enough tragedy to make Shakespeare gasp. These characters are put through hell.

Sons of Chaos is first and foremost a war comic, and a brutal one at that. Jaymes and Aragon do not shy away from showing how savage this conflict was. "—Monkeys Fighting Robots

"Sons of Chaos is ultimately a story of fathers and sons, in many ways lost boys robbed of empathy and compassion by torturous deprivations inflicted by other broken men. It tells of the ruinous burden of vengeance on the hearts and minds of those imprisoned by it, and it's poignancy cannot be understated in the world we find ourselves in."—Comic Attack

"Beneath all the blood and carnage, Sons of Chaos is actually a very personal story. It's a coming-of-age tale. Readers watch Marcos grow up over the course of the war. Through the various tragedies he goes through, he learns to not only be a fighter, but a leader. It's an inspiring transformation. Marcos is our window into this world, and Jaymes writes him as a very sympathetic character. We build a strong connection to him as readers, which makes his arc all the more fulfilling by the time we turn the final page.

Marcos has a tangled relationship with his father, something mirrored in the story of his rival, Muhktar, son of Ali Pasha. Then there's Marcos' own relationship with Ali, his captor. These complicated relationships makes Chaos more than just a story about Greece fighting for its independence; it becomes a story about people fighting for their own personal independence. War stories aren't popular because of the blood and guts and mayhem. That's part of it, sure, but the most successful war stories have this human element to them.Chris Jaymes, Ale Aragon, and their whole team have crafted something special with Sons of Chaos. It's an epic story in the purest sense of the word, and you'll even learn a little about a lesser known conflict that had major ramifications on the world."—Monkeys Fighting Robots

== The Team ==
  - Written: Chris Jaymes
  - Illustrations: Ale Aragon
  - Color: Hi-Fi Design
  - Letters & Design: Pablo Ayala
  - Research Assistants: Jeff Tollefson & Matt Roznovok
  - Cover Art: David Palumbo
  - Design: Cody Tilson
  - Executive producers: Nick Lambrou & Michael Wortsman
  - Company: Levendis Entertainment
  - Greek Production: Efi Papazahariou
  - US Publisher: Penguin Random House, IDW Publishing
  - Greek Publisher: Kaktos Publishing
