= Kyle T. Heffner =

American television and film actor (born 1957)

- Born: Kyle Troy Heffner; May 21, 1957 (age 68); Chicago, Illinois, U.S.
- Other names: Kyle Heffner
- Education: Northwestern University
- Occupation: Actor
- Years active: 1982–present

Kyle Troy Heffner (born May 21, 1957) is an American television and film actor.

== Early life and education ==
Heffner was born Kyle Troy Heffner on May 21, 1957 in Chicago and graduated from Northwestern University.

== Career ==
After graduation, he moved to Los Angeles and met Garry Marshall, who cast him in Young Doctors in Love (1982). Heffner also appeared in the films Flashdance (1983), The Woman in Red (1984), Runaway Train (1985), Spellbinder (1988) and When Harry Met Sally... (1989). Heffner has appeared in numerous television series such as the CBS sitcom Rules of Engagement (2010), as well as television pilots, guest spots, commercials and more films. He played the role of 'shadowy government operative' in the 2014 movie Red Sky.

== Personal life ==
Heffner resides in Los Angeles with his wife and two children.

== Filmography ==
=== Film ===
Year	Title	Role	Notes
1982	Young Doctors in Love	Dr. Charles Litto	
1983	Flashdance	Richie	
1984	The Woman in Red	Richard	
1985	Warning Sign	Video Technician #1	
1985	Runaway Train	Frank Barstow	
1988	Spellbinder	Herbie Green	
1988	Angel III: The Final Chapter	Tom Santangelo	
1989	When Harry Met Sally...	Gary	
1989	Mutant on the Bounty	Max Gordon	
1999	The Lords of Los Angeles	Sean	
2000	Love, Lust & Joy	Doctor	
2001	Backflash	Vinnie 'Pipe' Pipolino	
2002	High Crimes	San Francisco Judge	
2003	Hellborn	Dr. Peter Francis	
2003	Shrink Rap	Dennis	
2009	The Least Among You	TV Announcer	
2013	The Book of Daniel	Mahmad	
2013	Free Ride	Messenger / Duane	
2014	Red Sky	Davis	
2014	Private Number	Mitch	
2015	The Burning Dead	Dr. Stevens	
2015	Bereave	Harry	
2020	The Downside of Bliss	Kenny	

=== Television ===
Year	Title	Role	Notes
1983	The Facts of Life	George	Episode: "Let's Party"
1983	Herndon	Satyajit	Television film
1984	The Jeffersons	Lawrence Tiverton III	Episode: "A New Girl in Town"
1986	D.C. Cops	Lucas Adams	Television film
1986	Scarecrow and Mrs. King	Sasha	Episode: "No Thanks for the Memory"
1988	Ohara	Ferguson	Episode: "Sign of the Times"
1989	Nikki and Alexander	Boyd	Television film
1990	The Golden Girls	Young Salvador	Episode: "Clinton Avenue Memoirs"
1990	Who's the Boss?	Arthur	Episode: "Four Alarm Tony"
1991	Murphy Brown	Howard	Episode: "Small"
1995	NewsRadio	Counterman	Episode: "No, This Is Not Based Entirely on Julie's Life"
1996	Seinfeld	Gene	Episode: "The Bizarro Jerry"
1996–1999	Suddenly Susan	Jerry	4 episodes
1997	Grace Under Fire	Interviewer #1	Episode: "Grace Graduates"
1999	L.A. Doctors	Ira Field	Episode: "Denial"
1999	L.A. Heat	Brian Winger	Episode: "Widow Maker"
1999	Nash Bridges	Bunker Bob	Episode: "Crash and Burn"
2000	Time of Your Life	Agent #2	Episode: "The Time They Cheated"
2002	For the People	Alvin	Episode: "Pawns"
2004	Curb Your Enthusiasm	Lawyer	Episode: "The Car Pool Lane"
2005	Desperate Housewives	Head Volunteer	Episode: "Move On"
2005	Family Plan	Sheldon	Television film
2008	Days of Our Lives	Reginald Lumberg	Episode #1.10858
2009	The Wishing Well	Keenie James	Television film
2010	Rules of Engagement	H.R. Guy	Episode: "Harassment"
2010	Parenthood	Coach	Episode: "Lost and Found"
2010	iCarly	Dr. Parper	Episode: "iSam's Mom"
2011	LLA: Lesbian Lovers Anonymous	Wesley	Episode: "Pilot"
2012	General Hospital	Dr. Chriton	Episode #1.12696
2013	Good Job, Thanks!	Alan Mills	Episode: "Dream Big"
2013	Shameless	Doctor	Episode: "Survival of the Fittest"
2014	Legends	FBI Agent Walter Pierce	Episode: "Iconoclast"
2014–2015	Dog Treats & Jingle Toys	Jake Christy	5 episodes
2015	Sense8	Lt. Duncan	Episode: "What's Going On?"
2015	Stitchers	Store Owner	Episode: "I See You"
2015	The Exes	Photographer One	Episode: "10 Things They Hate About You"
2016	The Calamities of Jane	Curtis Daniel Naragon	3 episodes
2016–2018	Trollhunters: Tales of Arcadia	Additional voices	8 episodes
2017–2018	DreamWorks Dragons	Additional voices	7 episodes
2019	3Below: Tales of Arcadia	Additional voices	Episode: "The Fall of House Tarron"
2019	Relative Race	Himself	2 episodes
