= For My Daughter's Honor =

- DVD cover
- Genre: Drama
- Written by: Diana Gould
- Directed by: Alan Metzger
- Starring: Gary Cole; Nicholle Tom
- Theme music composer: James McVay
- Country of origin: United States
- Original language: English

Production
- Executive producers: Joan Barnett; Jack Grossbart
- Producers: Jonathan Bernstein; Linda L. Kent
- Cinematography: Geoffrey Erb
- Editor: Sidney Wolinsky
- Running time: 88 minutes
- Production company: Grossbart Barnett Productions

Original release
- Network: CBS
- Release: November 20, 1996

For My Daughter's Honor (also released as Indecent Seduction) is a 1996 American made-for-television drama film directed by Alan Metzger and starring Gary Cole, Nicholle Tom, Mac Davis and Mary Kay Place. It originally aired on CBS on November 20, 1996.

== Plot ==
In the fictional town of Tate, Oklahoma, 14-year-old Amy Dustin starts high school along with her two best friends, Kelly and Kimberley. Amy’s mother is going to interior design school and her dad works at an auto dealership. Amy feels estranged from her parents because lately their relationship is tense so she spends a lot of time with her friends. At a school football game, Amy takes an interest in the team coach, Pete Nash, who reciprocates her feelings and despite him being an adult teacher and having a wife and children, the two soon begin a secret relationship. He passes notes to her in class and starts hanging around her and her friends. One afternoon, the school librarian sees them hugging; she reports Pete's behaviour to the school principal who quickly shrugs off her allegations, claiming he is simply a popular teacher.

Amy becomes friends with Pete's teenage daughter, Cassie after he introduces them. One night after going to a rock concert chaperoned by Pete, Amy stays over at their house. During the night, Pete wakes Amy up and convinces her to sleep with him although she is not ready, taking her virginity. Amy leaves the following morning upset and confused. Her mother, Betty Ann, notices differences in her but puts it down to teenage hormones.

Amy alludes to what has been going on with Pete to her friends and Kimberley reports it; the principal dismisses her allegations also, believing she is just jealous of the attention Amy is getting. At a school festival, Amy dances with a fellow student, Corey, who had asked her out. He had always been interested in Amy but never approached her in the past as she was always around Pete. Amy dancing with Corey infuriates Pete. He drags her outside and drives her out into the middle of nowhere, where he once again convinces her to sleep with him, claiming he loves her and is going to leave his wife. Amy's dad, Norm, is later informed about the incident and angrily confronts Pete, who claims it’s all rumors and that he merely sees Amy as his own daughter and was just looking out for her as Corey has a bad reputation with girls.

While Amy is away on a camping trip with the Nash family and Amy’s friend Kelly, Kelly sees Amy and Pete embrace which leads Amy to eventually confess to Kelly that the two slept together and to swear her to secrecy. Later on, Amy’s mom, Betty Ann, finds a love letter from Pete in Amy's room and reports it to the principal; both Amy and Pete deny an affair. Amy decides to end the relationship, finding herself more and more controlled by Pete who has become controlling and possessive, and she eventually admits everything to her mom and then her parents. Pete is arrested; he receives a jail sentence of five months as well as a 10-year probation.

Betty Ann decides to sue the school due to them not acting on several allegations. Amy's classmates begin acting hostile towards her as they blame her for Pete getting arrested because she came forward and because of the allegations Pete can no longer coach. She falls out with her friends, leading to the Dustin home being vandalized. Amy considers dropping the case because she fears the aftermath will not be worth it, but eventually decides to go through with it, realizing she was groomed. A friend of Pete's visits him in prison. Pete begs him to give Amy a note, which disgusts the friend, who tells him, "That’s not how you love a child."

Amy and her family continue to work with their lawyers who think they have a successful case against the school board, and Amy begins to rebuild her life. The film ends with Betty Ann and Amy hugging in the car on the drive home from the lawyers; Betty Ann calls Amy her hero, and their estranged relationship is lovingly restored. The Dustin family go on to win the case.

== Cast ==
- Gary Cole as Pete Nash
- Nicholle Tom as Amy Dustin
- Mac Davis as Norm Dustin
- Mary Kay Place as Betty Ann Dustin
- Alyson Hannigan as Kelly
- Sara Rue as Kimberly Jones
- Sean Murray as Ralph
- Sheeri Rappaport as Missy Ross
- Ron Melendez as Cory Wilkins
- Tom Virtue as Principal Chuck Arnet
