= Private Number (2014 film) =

- Film poster
- Directed by: LazRael Lison
- Written by: LazRael Lison
- Produced by: Tatiana Chekhova; LazRael Lison; Travis Huff
- Starring: Hal Ozsan; Nicholle Tom; Judd Nelson; Tom Sizemore
- Cinematography: Daniel Marks
- Edited by: Daric Gates
- Music by: Harold Squire
- Production company: Summer House Pictures
- Distributed by: ARC Entertainment
- Release date: July 17, 2014
- Running time: 95 minutes
- Country: United States
- Language: English

Private Number is a 2014 American psychological horror film written and directed by LazRael Lison. An alcoholic novelist who suffers from writer's block (Hal Ozsan) and his wife (Nicholle Tom) receive repeated, inexplicable crank phone calls that push them to the edge. It premiered in July 2014 and received a limited release in May 2015. The DVD was released a month later.

== Plot ==
Michael Lane, a moderately successful author, experiences writer's block while working on his second novel. A recovering alcoholic, he credits his wife, Katherine, with saving him from losing everything. He is tempted to return to drinking when the stressors in his life pile on: he does not get along with his next-door neighbor, Mitch; Katherine wants a baby; he has been subject to a series of prank calls; and he is under pressure by everyone to complete his novel. He confides to his Alcoholics Anonymous sponsor, Jeff, that he has recently begun experiencing hallucinations again despite his lack of drinking. Jeff, a psychologist, suggests that the stress in his life may be to blame.

Michael and Katherine continue to be disturbed by prank calls during the night. When an apparent intruder sets off their alarm, they contact the police. However, Sheriff Stance, who harbors a dislike for Michael, dismisses their concerns and insinuates that Michael has resumed drinking. As the pressures on Michael intensify, he is taunted by the main character of his previous novel, an English knight, and begins to experience gruesome hallucinations of murdered people. The knight urges him to return to drinking, but Michael resists by looking at a picture of his wife and recalling his vow to stay sober.

When friends Mary and Bill are over at their house, their son Mason discovers the Lanes' voicemail and plays back the messages left by the crank callers, who repeated the question, "Remember me?" When Mason refuses to stop playing the messages, Michael strikes him and becomes entranced by the voicemail, from which he claims to hear secret messages when played in reverse. When Bill and Mary confront him, he initially ignores them while translating the messages, then beats up Bill. Distressed, Katherine tells him to seek professional help. After seeing further hallucinations that night, Michael finally drinks an entire bottle of whiskey. When Katherine finds out, she tells him that she is leaving him. Michael insists that they are being haunted and that he needs her help.

As Katherine is about to leave, Detective Taylor stops her and jokes that his research into their crank calls has led him to believe they may be of paranormal origin. Suddenly realizing that Michael may be right, Katherine returns to him, and they research a local unsolved case that involves a serial killer. Taylor confirms that the names Michael has heard on his voice mail are the killer's victims but cannot help any further, as Sheriff Stance has sealed the case's records and warned him to back off. Michael hires a local computer repairman to hack into the police records, where he discovers the serial killer uses a different standardized psychological M.O. in each killing. The sixth and final M.O. has yet to be used, and Michael becomes convinced that the victims' ghosts want him to stop the killer before he strikes again.

The crank calls from the ghosts continue unabated, and Katherine becomes mysteriously ill. Frustrated, Michael shouts at the ghosts and demands to know who killed them. Voices from his phone stun Michael as they tell him he did. Michael initially denies it but experiences a series of flashbacks, where he remembers murdering the victims and planning Katherine's murder. Before he could finish his plan, he suffered head trauma when one of his victims fought back. He stumbled out of her house with her manuscript, and, because of his amnesia, assumed that he had written it. As the memories come back to him, he returns to his previous killer personality and attempts to murder Katherine; the knight once again encourages him. As she hides from him, the police arrive and take him prisoner. During the subsequent interrogation, Sheriff Stance threatens to kill Michael. When Stance backs down, Michael laughs, calls him weak, and says he has only just begun.

== Cast ==
- Hal Ozsan as Michael Lane
- Nicholle Tom as Katherine Lane
- Judd Nelson as Sheriff Stance
- Tom Sizemore as Jeff
- Ray Stoney as Detective Taylor
- Kyle T. Heffner as Mitch
- Anastasia Roussel as Mary
- Morgan Peter Brown as Bill
- Magnus James Hennessy as Mason
- Gary McDonald as Knight

== Production ==
Writer-director Lison was inspired by The Ring, The Shining, Sinister, and Mama, all of which he said were more character-driven than traditional horror films.

== Release ==
Private Number premiered in Beverly Hills on July 17, 2014. ARC Entertainment gave it a limited theatrical release on May 1, 2015. It was released on DVD on June 2, 2015, and grossed $136,810 in US sales.

== Reception ==
Justin Lowe of The Hollywood Reporter wrote that the film awkwardly blends elements of psychological thriller, horror, and mystery into "an ineffective hybrid". Martin Tsai of the Los Angeles Times wrote, "The film feels like scenes from different screenplays cobbled together without the rough edges polished off." Michael Gingold of Fangoria rated it 1.5/4 stars and called it predictable but poorly plotted, as the plot twist does not organically flow. Drew Tinnin of Dread Central rated it 1/5 stars and called it "more soap opera thriller than straight up horror".
