= Find 815 =

Alternate reality game

Find 815 is the second alternate reality game (ARG) for the American Broadcasting Company's serial drama television series Lost. It began on December 28, 2007, and concluded on January 31, 2008, with the premiere of the fourth season of Lost. The free registration ARG follows Oceanic Airlines IT technician Sam Thomas as he investigates the whereabouts of Oceanic Flight 815, on which his girlfriend Sonya was a flight attendant. Of the 324 people on board the flight, seventy-one survived and they serve as the characters of Lost. Lost previously hosted an ARG during the hiatus between the second and third seasons called the Lost Experience. Find 815 was produced by digital entertainment company Hoodlum and ABC.

== Gameplay ==
=== Pre-release ===
On December 28, 2007, ABC's press website (ABC Medianet) uploaded a press release announcing the return to business of the fictitious Oceanic Airlines. The release contained a phone number, which when called, instructs the listener to visit a website, which features a commercial for Oceanic. On December 31, the site was updated with a video of Sam explaining his situation intercut with flashes of a URL. The official Find 815 website contains more videos of Sam as he begins to uncover the truth of what happened to 815.

At Sydney Airport, the Seven Network placed a billboard near the exit, featuring a picture of an Oceanic Airlines hostess and the company's symbol with the words "find815.com" 'painted' over the company's name.

=== Chapter 1 ===
On December 31, 2007, Find815.com launched, and players were able to start the game. A newscast kicks off the game, and visitors learn that Oceanic Airways is making two monumental decisions: (1) the search for Flight 815 is to be called off, and (2) Oceanic Airways will be returning to the skies. Protagonist Sam Thomas is introduced, and his connection to 815/LOST is explained in subsequent video diaries. It turns out that Sam's partner, Sonya, was a flight attendant for Oceanic, and was on Flight 815. Only a few short months after 815 crashed, Oceanic will be calling off the search and focusing on its return to the skies. However, Sam has been quite vocal about the need to continue the search, and how he is going to "get to the bottom of what's really going on". One night, Sam receives an email, from an unknown person, with an attached picture of Sonya. However, upon closer view, a few clues were hidden in the emailed picture. After writing down all four clues ("The Black Rock", "Christiane I", "Sunda Trench", and "Tell No-One - Grave Consequences"), Sam replies to the unknown source, and then receives a garbled response with a hidden website in it ("The-maxwell-group.com").

Sam emails his friend Tracy to find out more about the four clues. The Black Rock was an old 19th century slaving ship that was mysteriously lost in the South Indian Ocean with 40 crew aboard. However, the ship was last seen leaving port in an easterly direction, when it should have been sailing to the west. But, more relevant to Sam, there is a boat called the Christiane I leaving Jakarta for the Sunda Trench. Sam decides that he needs to get on that boat.

=== Chapter 2 ===
On January 7, 2008, Chapter 2 began. Sam has followed the mysterious email message from the Maxwell Group to Jakarta and has located the Christiane I. It is just about to embark on an expedition to the Sunda Trench. In order to secure a seat for himself, he must prove himself to the captain, Mr. Ockham. A man named Talbot tells Captain Ockham that this is not acceptable. Talbot begins to question Sam about his interest in the Sunda Trench, but Sam tells him he is just looking to get away on a trip. Ockham asks why Talbot is questioning Sam, and Talbot responds that his employers know a great deal about Ockham and his crew and that they have too much at stake to risk any surprises. Talbot questions Sam further, indicating knowledge of a girlfriend, and suggests that Sam is running away from something. Sam is unnerved. Ockham tells Talbot that they need Sam aboard, as their destination could be hazardous to the electrical equipment. Talbot consents, but says that he will install security measures.

Later on in his berth, Sam begins to play with an old radio. In the static, Sam hears an old newscast detailing that radio communications with Amelia Earhart had been lost and that her last transmission had been "this morning" at 8:43.

== Characters ==
- Sam Thomas (Rodger Corser) used to be an IT Technician for Oceanic Airlines. His partner, Sonya was a flight attendant on Flight 815.
- Sonya was a flight attendant on Flight 815 and Sam's girlfriend.
- Oscar Talbot is a mysterious man who runs the Christiane I expedition.
- David Massingham and Tracey R are friends of Sam Thomas that gather information for him.
- Sam's Mum frequently contacts him, asking him if he is okay.
- Mr Ockham the captain of the Christiane I vessel, reluctantly allows Sam onto the expedition.
