= Marsha Thomason =

British actress (born 1976)

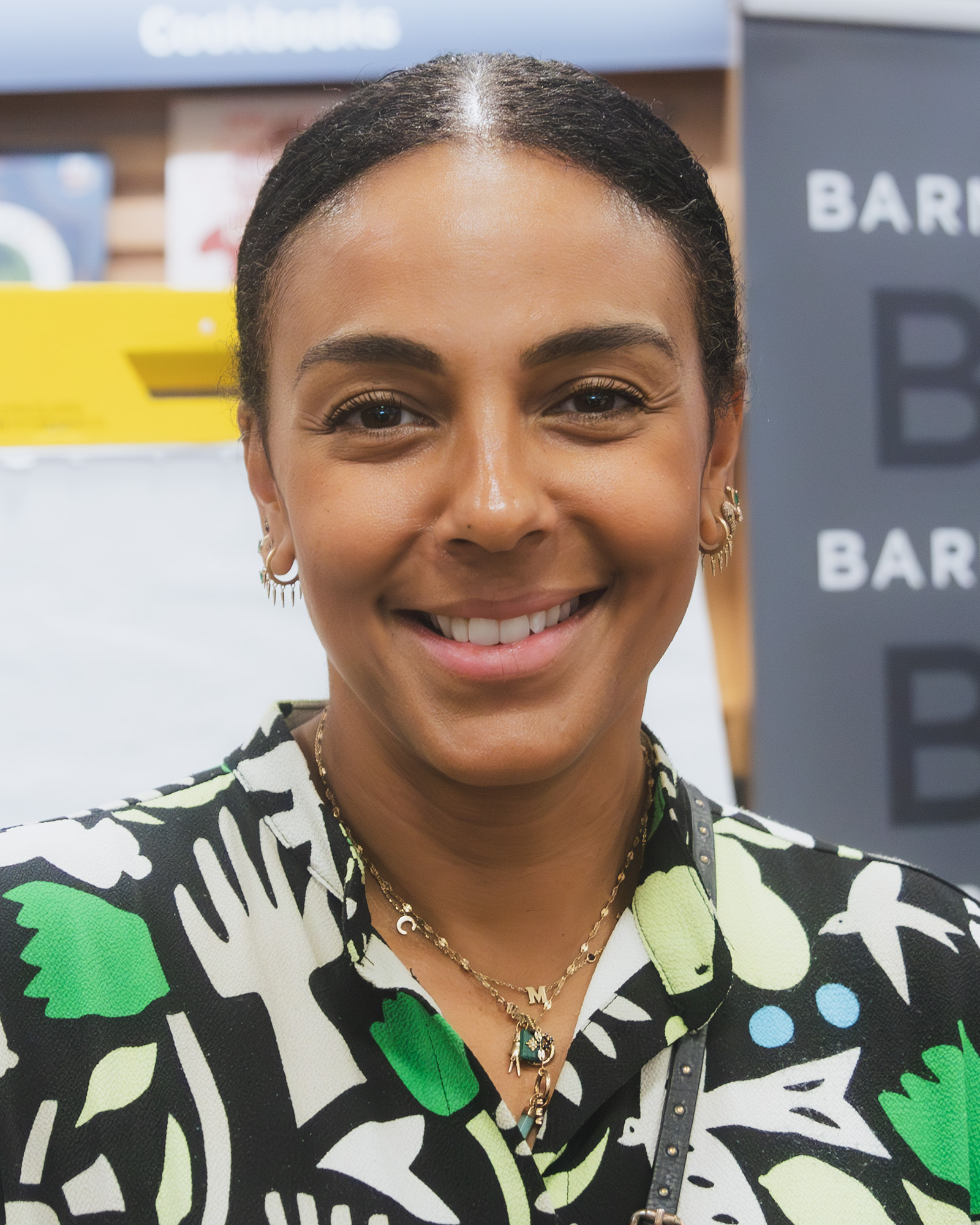
- Thomason in 2026
- Born: 19 January 1976 (age 50); Manchester, England
- Citizenship: United Kingdom; United States
- Education: Manchester Metropolitan University (BA)
- Occupation: Actress
- Years active: 1993–present
- Spouse: Craig Sykes (m. 2009)
- Children: 1

Marsha Lisa Thomason Sykes (born 19 January 1976) is a British actress. Her films include The Haunted Mansion (2003). On television, she is known for her roles in the NBC series Las Vegas (2003–2005), the ABC series Lost (2007–2010), the USA Network series White Collar (2009–2014), the Sky One series COBRA (2020–2023) and the ITV crime drama The Bay (2022–).

== Early life ==
Thomason was born in Moston, Manchester to a Jamaican-born mother who arrived in England at age 10 and a father of English, Irish, and Scottish heritage. Thomason attended Holy Trinity Church of England Primary School in Blackley and the (now defunct) North Manchester High School for Girls in Moston, and completed her A Levels at Oldham Sixth Form College. She graduated with a Bachelor of Arts (BA) in English from Manchester Metropolitan University. At age 13, Thomason joined Oldham Theatre Workshop, where she participated in youth theatre productions.

== Career ==
Thomason first came to prominence on British television playing Sally in the fifth series of the BBC One police procedural Pie in the Sky in 1997. This was followed by roles in 1998 as Sharon "Shazza" Pearce in Playing the Field, also on BBC One, and Jacqui Richard in the ITV series Where the Heart Is.

Thomas had her first notable film roles in Black Knight (2001), Long Time Dead (2002) as Lucy and Pure (2002) as Vicki with Keira Knightley. In 2003, Thomas starred in Disney's The Haunted Mansion with Eddie Murphy, appeared in the first series of the BBC Three drama Burn It as Tina, and began starring in the NBC series Las Vegas as Nessa Holt, a role she would play for two seasons. On 21 October 2004, Thomason was a guest on the radio show Loveline. Thomason led the 2006 film Caffeine.

In 2007, Thomason joined the recurring cast of the ABC science fiction series Lost as Naomi Dorrit. Being a friend of Dominic Monaghan (who played Charlie Pace on the series), she was a huge fan of the show and excited to be cast.

In January 2008, she appeared in the BBC One drama Messiah V: The Rapture. In August 2008, Thomason was cast as a series regular in the CW comedy-drama Easy Money as Julia Miller. In late 2009, she appeared in the medical soap opera General Hospital. She also had a recurring role in the ABC Family teen gymnastics drama Make It or Break It.

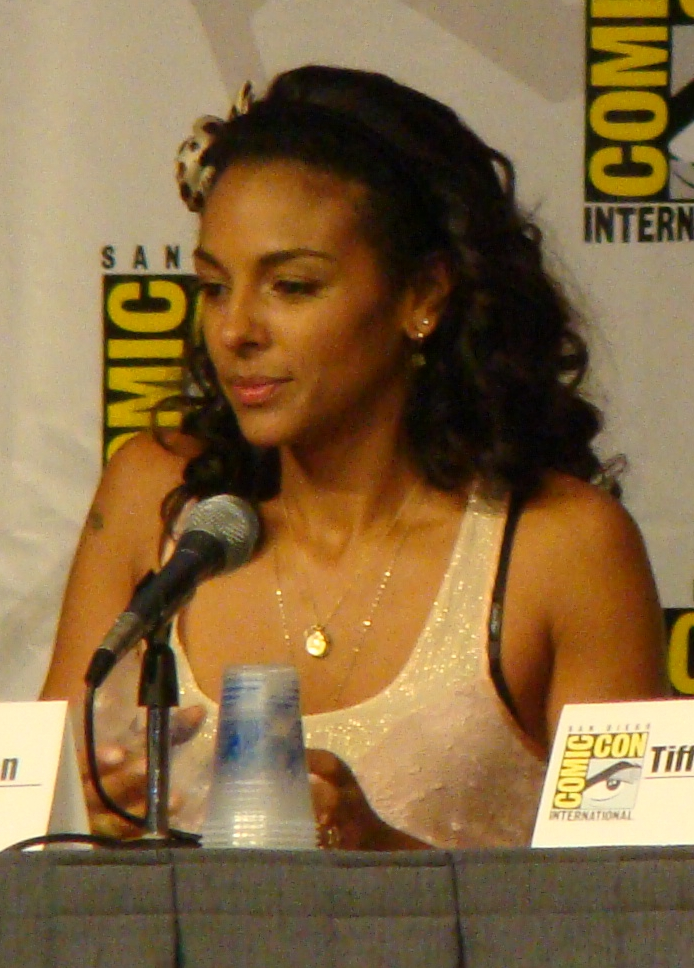
Thomason in 2012

After appearing in the pilot episode for the USA Network series White Collar as agent Diana Berrigan, she returned for the first-season finale. Thomason was promoted to main for the second season, a role she would play until 2014. Thomason returned to British television in 2015, starring as Katy Carmichael opposite Christopher Eccleston in first series of the ITV crime drama Safe House.

Thomason had a recurring role in seasons 9 to 11 of the CBS series NCIS: Los Angeles (2017–2020) as Nicole DeChamps. From 2020 to 2023, Thomason had a main role as fictional Labour Party MP Francine Bridge in the Sky One political thriller COBRA. In 2022, she joined the cast of the ITV crime drama The Bay for its third series as DS Jenn Townsend, taking over as lead from Morven Christie.

== Personal life ==
As of 2004, Thomason was based between London, England and Los Angeles, California. On 5 April 2009, Thomason married lighting technician Craig Sykes in Malibu, California. Their daughter was born in June 2013. Thomason became an American citizen in 2012.

== Filmography ==
=== Film ===
Film
Year	Title	Role	Notes
1994	Priest	Nurse	
2001	Black Knight	Victoria the Chambermaid and Nicole	
2002	Long Time Dead	Lucy	
2002	Pure	Vicki	
2003	The Haunted Mansion	Sara Evers and Elizabeth Henshaw	
2004	My Baby's Daddy	Brandy	
2005	The Nickel Children	Beatrice	
2006	The Package	Melissa	Short film
2006	Caffeine	Rachel	
2006	The Fast One	Lucy	Comedy short
2006	The Tripper	Linda	
2006	Tug of War	Sam	Comedy short
2007	LA Blues	Carla	
2009	Into the Blue 2: The Reef	Azra	
TBA	The Extraordinary Farewell	Claire Samuels	Pre-production

=== Television ===
Television
Year	Title	Role	Notes
1993	Safe	Wendy	TV film
1996	Prime Suspect	Janice	Episode: Prime Suspect 5: "Errors of Judgement"
1996	Brazen Hussies	Stripper with fire	TV film
1997	Pie in the Sky	Sally	8 episodes
1998	Playing the Field	Sharon 'Shazza' Pearce	
1998–1999	Where the Heart Is	Jacqui Richards	20 episodes
1999	Love in the 21st Century	Louise	Episode: "Threesome"
2001	Table 12	Denie	Episode: "Guess Who's Not Coming to Dinner"
2001	Swallow	Tina Harford	TV film
2003	Burn It	Tina	3 episodes
2003–2005	Las Vegas	Nessa Holt	Seasons 1–2 (Main cast: 47 episodes)
2007	Cane	Miranda Sanfilipino	Episode: "Family Business"
2007–2010	Lost	Naomi Dorrit	12 episodes
2008	Life	Jill Abrahams	Episode: "The Business of Miracles"
2008	Easy Money	Julia Miller	8 episodes
2008	Messiah V: The Rapture	Mel Palmer	TV film
2009	General Hospital	Gillian Carlyle	4 episodes
2009–2010	Make It or Break It	Mary Jane "MJ" Martin	6 episodes
2009–2014	White Collar	Special Agent Diana Berrigan	Season 1 (2 episodes: Pilot, Finale); Seasons 2–6 (main cast)
2011	2 Broke Girls	Cashandra	2 episodes
2013–2014	Men at Work	Selena	2 episodes
2014	House of Lies	Acquaintance	Episode: "Soldiers"
2015	Safe House	Katy	4 episodes
2017	Bones	Amy Bryan	Episode: "The Tutor in the Tussle"
2017–2020	NCIS: Los Angeles	Nicole DeChamps	8 episodes
2017–2018	The Good Doctor	Dr. Isabel Barnes	3 episodes
2018	SEAL Team	Staff Sergeant Vanessa Ryan	3 episodes
2019	Better Things	Mer Kodis	3 episodes
2020–2023	COBRA	Francine Bridge	
2020	MacGyver	Dr. Cheryl Werner	Episode: "Tesla + Bell + Edison + Mac"
2021	Castlevania	Greta	Voice, 6 episodes
2021	Magnum P.I.	Eve	Season 4 recurring
2022–present	The Bay	DS Jenn Townsend	Lead role; since series 3
2022	FreakAngels		Voice

=== Video games ===
Video games
Year	Title	Role	Notes
2012	Hitman: Absolution	Diana Burnwood	
