= Murder of Michele Avila =

Murder of an American teenager

Michele Avila
- Born: Michele Yvette Avila; February 8, 1968; Los Angeles, California, U.S.
- Died: October 1, 1985 (aged 17); Los Angeles County, California, U.S.
- Cause of death: Homicide by forced drowning
- Body discovered: Angeles National Forest
- Resting place: San Fernando Mission Cemetery
- Other name: Missy Avila
- Education: San Fernando High School

Michele Yvette "Missy" Avila (February 8, 1968 – October 1, 1985) was an American teenager who was murdered by her rivals and former best friends, Karen Severson and Laura Doyle, in October 1985.

== Background ==
Michele Avila grew up in Arleta, Los Angeles, in the San Fernando Valley. Avila and Karen Severson had been best friends since age eight. The two girls began to grow apart when they entered San Fernando High School; Severson reportedly grew jealous of Avila because she was considered more popular and attractive. Severson was also upset because Avila began spending less time with her, opting to spend her time with boys. Severson later started a rumor that Avila was sleeping with various boys. As a result, Avila was beaten up by a group of girls who accused her of sleeping with their boyfriends.

During the girls' junior year in high school, Avila began dating a boy named Randy. Avila broke the relationship off after a month due to Randy's constant partying. Shortly after the break up, Severson and Randy began a relationship and eventually moved into an apartment together. Severson later told Avila's mother Irene that she had witnessed Randy pulling Avila onto his lap at a party. At the time, Avila told Randy she was not interested in rekindling their relationship and advised Severson to break up with Randy. The incident angered Severson and she stopped speaking to Avila. Ten days before Avila's death, the two got into a physical altercation in a neighborhood park. According to witnesses, Severson threatened Avila with a broken beer bottle and then pushed and slapped her.

== Murder ==
Murder of Michele Avila
- Location: Los Angeles County, California
- Date: October 1, 1985
- Attack type: Murder by drowning
- Victim: Michele Avila
- Perpetrators: Laura Doyle, Karen Severson
- Motive: Jealousy
- Verdict: Guilty
- Convictions: Second-degree murder

On October 1, 1985, Avila told her mother that she was going out with a school friend, Laura Doyle. Doyle picked Avila up and the two left. Four hours later, Doyle called Avila's mother and asked to speak to Missy. After Avila's mother told Doyle that she thought her daughter was with her, Doyle told her that she had dropped Avila off with three boys driving a blue Camaro. After getting gas, Doyle said she returned to the location where she dropped Avila off, but she and the three boys were gone.

On October 4, Avila's body was found face down in a stream in Big Tujunga Canyon in Angeles National Forest. She had been forcibly drowned in six inches of water, her waist-length hair was hacked off and there was a four-foot log on top of her body.

== Conviction and aftermath ==
Irene Avila later said she had no reason to suspect Severson or Doyle were involved in her daughter's death. Both attended Avila's funeral and Doyle sent the family a sympathy card along with $20. Severson also moved in with Irene Avila for a time to console her and become a "surrogate daughter" (although Severson disputes this). Severson was also seemingly obsessed with the murder. She visited Avila's grave several times a week, covered the walls of her room with pictures of Avila and newspaper clippings about the crime, and repeatedly visited the creek where Avila's body was found. At one point, she told Irene Avila that she saw Michele's ghost.

Police had no leads and the case went cold. On July 26, 1988, Eva Chirumbolo, another teen who took the 45-minute drive into the mountains, told police about the murder. Severson and Doyle were arrested and charged with first degree murder. According to the prosecutors, Severson and Doyle lured Avila to the creek and then yelled at her about her promiscuity. Both girls accused her of having sex with their boyfriends and told her that she had messed up too many relationships. The two then held Avila face down in approximately six inches of water. To hold her body down in the water, they placed a 4 foot (1.2 m), 100 lb (45 kg) log on her body.

In March 1990, Severson and Doyle were convicted of second degree murder, and sentenced to 15 years to life in prison. The jurors later said they were not convinced that the murder was planned and rejected the first degree murder charge. Karen Severson was released from prison on December 9, 2011, after serving 21.5 years. Laura Doyle was released from prison in December 2012 after serving 22 years.

After Severson left prison, she began promoting a memoir about the crime and her prison experience and made a deal to have a film produced. Avila's family sued her in 2015, seeking to take the profits of the sales. Because of this, the State of California passed Missy's Law, requiring entities who are helping publish works made by criminals to contact the families of the victims about the works.

== In popular culture ==
- The case inspired a book, Missy's Murder by Karen Kingsbury, who covered the case.
- The case also inspired a movie, A Killer Among Friends, starring Tiffani-Amber Thiessen and Patty Duke.
- On January 13, 2012, the case was featured on an episode of Deadly Women called "Deadly Delinquents".
- On March 31, 2013, the case was featured on an episode of Unusual Suspects called "Deadly Forest".
- On December 17, 2014, the case was featured on the Dr. Phil show, including an interview with Karen Severson.
- On October 5, 2018, the Investigation Discovery series Killer In Plain Sight documented the case in the episode "Circle of Distrust."

== See also ==
- Child murder
- If I Did It: Confessions of the Killer
- Lists of solved missing person cases
- Murder of Shanda Sharer
- Murder of Skylar Neese
- Murder of Maryann Measles
- Slender Man stabbing
