= Lowell Park =

Lowell Park may refer to:

- Lowell Park (ballpark), a ballpark in Cotuit, Massachusetts
- Lowell Park (Dixon, Illinois), a municipal park
- Lowell Park (novel)
