= Pandemic (miniseries) =

- Movie poster
- Written by: Bryce Zabel; Jackie Zabel
- Directed by: Armand Mastroianni
- Starring: Tiffani Thiessen; Vincent Spano; French Stewart; Bruce Boxleitner; Eric Roberts; Faye Dunaway
- Country of origin: United States
- Original language: English

Production
- Cinematography: Amit Bhattacharya
- Editor: Jennifer Jean Cacavas
- Running time: 180 minutes
- Production companies: Larry Levinson Productions; RHI Entertainment

Original release
- Network: Hallmark Channel
- Release: May 26, 2007

Pandemic is a 2007 Hallmark Channel original miniseries with an ensemble cast. It premiered on May 26, 2007 at 8:00 PM as part of Hallmark Channel's "Uncharted Adventures" weekend. It is now available on DVD through Hallmark Entertainment.

== Synopsis ==
On a beach in Australia, two American surfers say goodbye to each other as one is about to leave for his flight back to California. The two men don't notice the large number of dead birds on the beach. On the flight, the surfer returning home starts coughing up blood and dies before the plane can land. Back in Australia, the other surfer is found dead in his apartment. Kayla Martin (Tiffani Thiessen) is a medical doctor with the Centers for Disease Control and Prevention (CDC) who has been assigned to the case. She and the local officials carry the body of the surfer out of the plane and start processing people to be put in quarantine until they can be evaluated for exposure. During the transfer, one of the passengers escapes to complete a business deal and unknowingly spreads the virus throughout Los Angeles. It is also revealed that outbreaks of the so-called "riptide virus" (as it comes to be known), an offshoot of the bird flu, are occurring in other cities around the world.

The situation is complicated further when one of the passengers, a convicted drug lord being transported by the FBI, escapes with the help of associates and a number of the other passengers, some of whom are infected. He proceeds to steal the medication needed to fight the outbreak and blackmails the local and state officials. As the epidemic worsens and the death toll rises all over California, the governor (Faye Dunaway) and mayor (Eric Roberts) have to find a way around their political differences so that they can make tough decisions dealing with the blackmail scheme, as well as a frightened populace and all of the problems associated with a widespread and deadly epidemic.

At the end, Kayla and her scientist team are able to find a cure: the drug lord's clear immunity to the virus is caused by his concurrent tuberculosis infection. Tubercular antibodies stop the virus from attaching to his lungs. They discover that administering antibodies from persons who have tuberculosis will cure the infected and give the others immunity from the virus. Blood from tuberculosis-infected persons is purified and administered to people, and Los Angeles is saved.

== Cast ==
- Tiffani Thiessen as Dr. Kayla Martin
- Faye Dunaway as Governor Lillian Shaefer
- French Stewart as Dr. Carl Ratner
- Eric Roberts as Mayor Richard Dellasandro
- Bruce Boxleitner as Kenneth Friedlander
- Vincent Spano as Troy Whitlock
- Bob Gunton as Dr. Max Sorkosky
- Michael Massee as Edward Vicente
- Dana Barron as Lindsey Mastrapa
- Tamlyn Tomita as Melissa Lo
- John Kapelos as Michael Torino
- Mary Jo Catlett as Sister Grace Woodward
- Clyde Kusatsu as Dr. Kenji Ito
- Barry Livingston as Dr. Winston Tam

== Awards ==
The WGA awarded writers Bryce Zabel and Jackie Zabel in 2008 the WGA Award (TV) for Original Long Form programming for the series' script.
