= A Killer Among Friends =

1992 US drama television film by Charles Robert Carner

- Home media artwork
- Genre: Drama
- Based on: The murder of Michele Avila
- Screenplay by: Christopher Lofton; John Miglis; Charlie Carner
- Story by: Christopher Lofton
- Directed by: Charles Robert Carner
- Starring: Patty Duke; Margaret Welsh; Tiffani Thiessen; Chad Todhunter
- Theme music composer: Richard Bellis
- Country of origin: United States
- Original language: English

Production
- Executive producers: Allen S. Epstein; Jim Green; Bonnie Raskin
- Producer: Mark Bacino
- Production location: Vancouver
- Cinematography: Richard Leiterman
- Editor: David Blangsted
- Running time: 96 minutes
- Production companies: Bonnie Raskin Productions; Green/Epstein Productions; Lorimar Television

Original release
- Network: CBS
- Release: December 8, 1992

A Killer Among Friends is a 1992 made-for-television docudrama that aired on CBS on December 8, 1992. Based on a true story, the film stars Patty Duke as a mother grieving for her murdered daughter and sets out to find the killer. The film is based on the real life murder of Michele Avila.

== Plot ==
Jennifer Monroe is a beautiful and popular teenager. Her friendship with her childhood best friend, Ellen Holloway, becomes strained due to Ellen's insecurities and increasing jealousy of Jenny's beauty, popularity with guys, and close relationship with her loving mother, Jean. Tensions grow worse after Ellen pressures Jenny into shoplifting and erroneously accuses her of sleeping with her boyfriend.

One day, Jenny leaves to hang out with her friend, Carla Lewis. When she does not return home, Jean becomes worried and alerts the police. Days later, Jenny is found in a creek, having been drowned, with a 100-pound log placed over her body. Jean is grief-stricken, and Ellen becomes her emotional support, eventually moving into her home. Jean becomes frustrated by the detectives' lack of progress in finding Jenny's killer. She and Ellen begin tracking their own leads, much at Ellen's behest. Ellen's behavior becomes increasingly erratic, and her obsession with the case intensifies, causing tension among Jean and her family, who feels Ellen is an unhealthy influence on her. Jean eventually asks Ellen to move out so that she can move on with her life.

Some time later, a guilt-ridden acquaintance of Jenny's, Kathy Pearl, goes to the police and confesses to witnessing Jenny's murder. She tells them Carla lured Jenny out of her house and drove her to a secluded wooded area in a National park, where Carla and Ellen confronted her with allegedly stealing their boyfriends. They taunted her, cut her hair, and forced her into a stream, eventually drowning her. After hearing the news, Jean is devastated but confronts Ellen at the police station, where she and Carla are arrested. After finally receiving closure, Jean attempts to move on with her family and find peace.

== Cast ==
- Patty Duke as Jean Monroe
- Margaret Welsh as Ellen Holloway
- Tiffani Thiessen as Jennifer Anne "Jenny" Monroe
- Angie Rae McKinney as Carla Lewis
- David Cubitt as Greg Monroe
- Janne Mortil as Kathy Pearl
- Loretta Swit as Detective Patricia Staley
- Debra Sharkey as Sheryl Monroe
- Chad Todhunter as Adam Monroe
- Ben Bass as Steve
- William S. Taylor as Detective Mike Collins
- Babs Chula as Diane
- Matthew Bennett as Dan
- Heather and Sharon Beatty as Celeste
- Barry Pepper as Mickey Turner
- Lisa Vultaggio as Susan
- Jacques LaLonde
- Catherine Lough
- Charles Andre
- Alfonso Quijada

== Production ==
A Killer Among Friends was filmed during the summer of 1992 in Vancouver under the working title of Friends to the End. The story for the film, based on the murder of Michele Avila, was conceived by Christopher Lofton, with the script by Lofton, John Miglis, and the film's director, Charles Robert Carner. Richard Leiterman was the cinematographer, with David Blangsted editing. Clyde Klotz served as art director, with Richard Wilcox as the production designer. Linda Vipond served as set decorator, with Les Baszo and Louise Roper assisting. Richard Bellis composed the music and Rick Patton served as sound editor.

The film was commissioned through Pacific Motion Pictures by Hallmark Entertainment. Bonnie Raskin Production and Green/Epstein Productions were involved in the film, with Lorimar Television responsible for broadcasting.

== Release ==
The film originally aired on CBS on December 8, 1992. It was re-released by CBS in 1995 with the debut of Amazing Grace on NBC, in which Duke also starred.

=== Rating ===
When the four major U.S. television networks agreed to place violence warnings on televised content after the matter was discussed in the United States Congress, A Killer Among Friends received a TV-14 rating.

== Reception ==
=== Critical reception ===
Marion Garmel, reviewing for The Indianapolis Star found the film to be unwatchable save for the performance of Margaret Welsh. Garmel found Patty Duke's performance "hammy" and Loretta Swit's too brief. John Goff, reviewing for Variety, commented on the lack of suspense in the presentation of the story. Goff praised Carner's directing as well as Duke's acting, and found the technical aspects of the film acceptable. Steven H. Scheuer, in a syndicated review printed in the Observer–Reporter, rated the film one star and called it "terrible". Scheuer disliked the dialogue, the "overdone" acting, and the lack of mystery involved after the killer is revealed during the first half. Briefly reviewing the film for New York, John Leonard compared it to Heathers and recommended potential viewers watch that instead.

Ray Loynd, reviewing for The Los Angeles Times, praised the performances given by Duke, Tiffani-Amber Thiessen, and Welsh. Loynd found the film "compelling" and "convincingly dramatized", though noted that Avila's brother described her differently than she is written in the film. Rick DuBrow, also writing for the Los Angeles Times, criticized CBS for the decision to use the surname "Monroe" rather than a Latino surname. DuBrow praised Duke's performance and noted that immediately following the film, the local CBS affiliate KCBS-TV aired an interview with Avila's mother and brother, calling it ironic and commenting that the decision to Anglicize the surname and heritage of the main characters was unnecessary.

=== Audience reception ===
A Killer Among Friends ranked fourth in the Nielsen ratings for December 7–13, 1992, with a 16.7 rating, indicating that 15.8 million households watched the film. The ratings secured it second place among Tuesday-night films at that point for the 1992–1993 season.
