= Buried Secrets (film) =

1996 horror television film

- Genre: Drama; Horror; Mystery
- Written by: John Leekley
- Directed by: Michael Toshiyuki Uno
- Starring: Tiffani-Amber Thiessen; Tim Matheson; Melinda Culea
- Theme music composer: J. Peter Robinson
- Country of origin: United States
- Original language: English

Production
- Executive producers: Richard Brams; Michele Brustin; John Leekley
- Producer: Richard Brams
- Cinematography: Richard Quinlan
- Editor: Charles Bornstein
- Running time: 87 minutes
- Production companies: Michele Brustin Productions; Scripps Howard Entertainment

Original release
- Network: NBC
- Release: November 4, 1996

Buried Secrets is a 1996 American drama horror television film directed by Michael Toshiyuki Uno, starring Tiffani-Amber Thiessen.

== Plot ==
Annalisse Vellum (Tiffani-Amber Thiessen) is a young woman who, along with her mother Laura Vellum (Melinda Culea), move back to her mother's hometown, sometime after the death of her father. They rent the home of Laura's old school classmate, Clay Roff (Tim Matheson), whose troubled teenage daughter Mary (Erika Flores) disappeared sometime earlier. Clay invites the two women to dinner at his house, where they meet his current wife, Danielle Roff (Kelly Rutherford), and his young daughter, Heather. Soon after moving in, Annalisse starts having nightmares about a woman falling over a cliff, and is being haunted by the spirit of Mary. Annalisse begins to suspect foul play in Mary's disappearance and the death of Mary's mother, Ann, who she was having the nightmares about. Annalisse is soon suspected of a mental disorder by her mother, Clay and Danielle.

Annalisse becomes interested in a local man, Johnny Toussard (Channon Roe), which upsets Mary's spirit. Clay warns her not to get involved with the dangerous man. Despite these warnings, the two see each other, setting off Mary's wrath. Danielle convinces Annalisse's mother to have her temporarily committed for observation. While Clay watches from outside, Danielle states that Annalisse may be suffering the same mental illness Mary had. When released, Annalisse decides to investigate into Danielle's past; she discovers Danielle was treating and drugging Mary, and suspects she murdered Ann. Mary possesses Annalisse to visit Johnny, confronts her father, and her spirit rides her beloved horse and tramples Danielle, killing her. Clay discovered Danielle had murdered Ann, drugged Mary into a psychotic state, and has been drugging Annalise to keep her silent. Danielle had been having an affair with the then-married Clay; she was pregnant and had been plotting to marry him. Clay had blocked out burying Mary's body by the cliff after he believed she had murdered her mother, then committed suicide. Mary's spirit is now at rest; she thanks Annalisse, saying she will wait for her on the other side, and vanishes. Annalisse reunites with Johnny and is free.

== Cast ==
- Tiffani-Amber Thiessen as Annalisse Vellum
- Tim Matheson as Clay Roff
- Melinda Culea as Laura Vellum
- Erika Flores as Mary Roff
- Kelly Rutherford as Danielle Roff
- Channon Roe as Johnny Toussard
