= Charles Robert Carner =

American TV and film director and writer

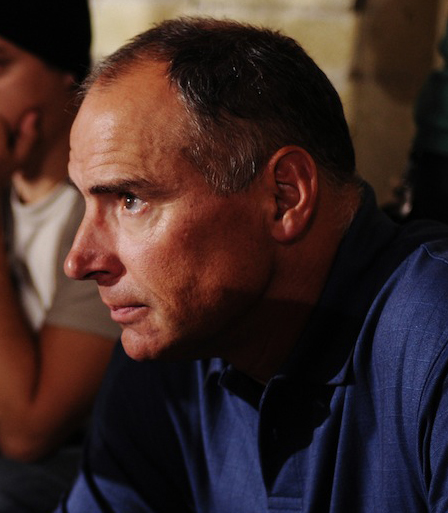
- Charles Robert Carner in photo dated May 23, 2011
- Born: April 30, 1957 (age 67); Chicago, Illinois, US
- Occupation(s): Television and film director, writer, film producer
- Spouse: Debra Carner
- Children: 3

Charles Robert Carner (born April 30, 1957) is an American TV and film director and writer. He is primarily known for directing numerous TV movies as well as the theatrical film Witless Protection. He was married to Debra Sharkey, with whom he has three children, Michael, Grace Noelle, and Vincent.

== Filmography ==
TV movies

Year	Title	Director	Writer
1985	Seduced	No	Yes
1991	Eyes of a Witness	No	Yes
1992	A Killer Among Friends	Yes	Yes
1994	One Woman's Courage	Yes	No
1997	Vanishing Point	Yes	Yes
1998	The Fixer	Yes	Yes
2000	Who Killed Atlanta's Children?	Yes	Yes
2001	Crossfire Trail	No	Yes
2002	Christmas Rush	Yes	Yes
2003	Red Water	Yes	No
2004	Judas	Yes	No
2016	J.L. Family Ranch	Yes	Yes

Feature film

Year	Title	Director	Writer
1985	Gymkata	No	Yes
1986	Let's Get Harry	No	Yes
1989	Blind Fury	No	Yes
2008	Witless Protection	Yes	Yes
TBA	Lowell Park	Yes	Yes
