= Rampage (DC Comics) =

- Rampage as depicted in Supergirl vol. 4 #6 (February 1997). Art by Gary Frank.

Publication information
- Publisher: DC Comics
- First appearance: Superman (vol. 2) #7 (July 1987)
- Created by: John Byrne

In-story information
- Alter ego: Karen Lou "Kitty" Faulkner
- Species: Metahuman
- Team affiliations: S.T.A.R. Labs
- Abilities: Superhuman strength, stamina, durability, and leaping; Solar radiation absorption; Gifted intelligence

Rampage (Karen Lou "Kitty" Faulkner) is a fictional character in the DC Comics. The character first appeared as a villain in Superman comic books, and was later utilized as a supporting character for Starman. Rampage has a distinct appearance, with orange skin, a towering, muscular build, and a fiery red mohawk. Rampage's personality is (like her namesake) hot-tempered, aggressive and uninhibited, the complete opposite of her alter ego Kitty Faulkner.

== Publication history ==
Rampage first appeared in Superman (vol. 2) #7 and was created by John Byrne.

== Fictional character biography ==
Dr. Kitty Faulkner develops a pollution-free solar energy source for a competition sponsored by the Daily Planet. During a public demonstration, Faulkner's colleague Dr. Thomas Moyers (who had earlier criticized her work in an interview with Lois Lane), shuts off the machine's safety systems. The resulting explosion transforms Faulkner into a metahuman with the ability to absorb solar energy, with each dose increasing her size and strength. Disoriented and confused, she runs amok through the streets of Metropolis. The Daily Planet, not knowing she is actually Kitty Faulkner, quickly dubs her "Rampage". Superman drains Faulkner's excess solar energy and returns her to normal.

After months of avoiding sun exposure, Faulker becomes ill and discovers that her body now requires constant sunlight to preserve her health. Moyers gives her a special collar that will maintain the proper amount of exposure to keep her alive, but Faulkner is instead transformed back into Rampage and forced to sabotage the presidential campaign of politician Herbert Forrest. Forrest and Moyers were former friends, but Moyers had come to resent the candidate's corrupt morality. After several attacks, Superman helps free Rampage from Moyers' control and brings him to justice. After modifying the collar, Faulkner gains control of her powers and accepts a job at S.T.A.R. Labs.

At S.T.A.R. Labs, Faulkner befriends Starman (Will Payton). She helps him on several occasions as Rampage, and the two form a relationship. Faulkner is later forced to return to Metropolis to take part in the major re-organization of S.T.A.R. Labs necessitated by the destruction of the corporation's main laboratory. She supervises S.T.A.R. Labs' efforts to reignite the sun in The Final Night storyline.

When Faulkner's colleague Christine Bruckner frames her for embezzlement, she snaps and tears off the collar, becoming Rampage once more and swearing to kill Bruckner for ruining her reputation. When Superman allows Rampage to attack Bruckner rather than attempt to stop her physically, Rampage willingly puts her collar back on and turns back to Faulkner while Supergirl forces Bruckner to confess what she had done. The experience permanently affects Faulkner, who decides never to use her power as Rampage again.

Faulkner later supervises the enhancement of the abilities of the hero Antaeus. In return, S.T.A.R. Labs gained valuable knowledge about the nature of genetically enhanced super-beings. Her work is praised and earns Faulkner a promotion to director of S.T.A.R. Labs in Metropolis.

== Powers and abilities ==
Faulkner's transformation into Rampage is triggered by exposure to sunlight, with her height and muscle mass increasing as long as she has solar energy to feed on. This enables superhuman strength, durability, and endurance, even allowing Rampage to jump vast distances in a single leap.

== Other versions ==
=== Future's End ===
An alternate universe version of Rampage appears in The New 52: Futures End. This version is a LexCorp geneticist.

=== Tangent Comics ===
An alternate universe version of Rampage appears in Tangent Comics: Doom Patrol #1 as a member of the eponymous group.

== In other media ==
=== Television ===
- Rampage appears in Justice League Unlimited, voiced by Susan Eisenberg in "Dead Reckoning" and by Lauren Tom in "The Great Brain Robbery", both of whom were uncredited. This version is a member of Gorilla Grodd's Secret Society before being killed by Darkseid.
- A character loosely based on Karen Faulkner named Kit Faulkner appears in the second season of Superman & Lois, portrayed by Catherine Lough Haggquist. This version is a geologist working for AmerTek Industries who oversees a mining operation at the Shuster Mine in Smallville and is connected to Ally Allston's Inverse Method cult. While attempting to keep people away from the Shuster Mine, Faulkner is killed by Bizarro.

=== Video games ===
Rampage appears as a character summon in Scribblenauts Unmasked: A DC Comics Adventure.

=== Miscellaneous ===
Rampage appears in the Supergirl tie-in digital comic Adventures of Supergirl. This Rampage is a flipped version of the character: an alien named Caren Falqnerr who sustains herself by absorbing sunlight and turns into a human as a disguise.
