= Red Water =

- Official DVD cover
- Written by: J.D. Feigelson
- Directed by: Charles Robert Carner
- Starring: Lou Diamond Phillips; Kristy Swanson; Coolio; Jaimz Woolvett; Rob Boltin; Langley Kirkwood; Gideon Emery; Charles Dumas
- Music by: Dominic Messenger
- Country of origin: United States
- Original language: English

Production
- Executive producers: Michael G. Larkin; Charles Robert Carner
- Producer: Mitch Engel
- Cinematography: Michael Goi
- Editor: Marc Leif
- Running time: 92 minutes
- Production companies: New Line Television; Sony Pictures Television

Original release
- Network: TBS Superstation
- Release: August 17, 2003

Red Water is a 2003 American made-for-television horror film starring Lou Diamond Phillips, Kristy Swanson, Gideon Emery and Coolio. When former oil rig worker turned fishing captain John Sanders (Lou Diamond Phillips) agrees to help when his ex-wife's company in extracting oil upriver and a group of thugs working for a Jamaican gangster search for $3 million buried underwater in the same bayou, a large man-eating bull shark finds its way in the river and wreaks havoc. The film was produced by New Line Television and Sony Pictures Television and originally premiered on TBS Superstation on August 17, 2003.

== Production and release ==
The film originally aired on TBS Superstation on August 17, 2003, and became one of the highest-rated films in the network's history. Directed by Charles Robert Carner and produced by Michael G. Larkin and Mitch Engel, the film tells the story of a bull shark which wreaks havoc as it makes its way up a river in Louisiana.

== Plot ==
A small oil rig located on a small river in Louisiana hits it big and former oiler John Sanders (who quit when a blowout occurred on a rig he was the boss of and four men died) and his friend Emery are hired to take his ex-wife Kelly and her boss to the location. Nearby, some thugs go diving for stolen goods that have been dumped in the river. Unfortunately, at the same time, a huge bull shark enters the river. Emery's people, a local tribe, believe that the shark is the physical manifestation of a spirit that supposedly protects the area where the well is located, brought forth as a form of vengeance for the driller's activities.

The shark begins to terrorize the area, killing several people, and an attempt by locals to kill it only drives it right back up the river, towards the oil rig. As a result of all the chaos, a $10,000 reward is posted for the shark's death. Unfortunately, John, Emery, Kelly and her boss are captured by the three thugs, and Kelly's boss is shot in the leg and ultimately bleeds to death. The oil rig has a blowout, killing two workers. The shark arrives and kills several people, seemingly taunting the crew by swimming around the rig.

The thugs force John and Kelly to dive for and recover the loot, while the thugs drink, mock each other and plot what to do with the money. Ice (Coolio) kills Brett in order to keep the money for himself and his partner, Jerry. John manages to escape from the thugs and, after helping Kelly and Emery to escape, shoots the fuel tank on his boat, killing Jerry. The only one remaining, Ice is killed by the shark while attempting to retrieve the money himself.

John manages to lure the shark under the oil rig and Emery activates the drill, dropping it into the shark's mouth, finally killing it. John, Kelly and Emery retrieve a tooth from the shark as proof of its death (the shark had bitten John on the foot, breaking off the tooth), and debate whether to collect the reward, but Emery, still believing the shark to have been a spirit in physical form, suggests that now that it is dead, they should just let it rest in peace. John heeds Emery's advice and tosses the tooth into the river, where it sinks to the bottom. Seconds later, the trio are found by the local sheriff, who shows up in a helicopter to check on them.

== Cast ==
- Lou Diamond Phillips as John Sanders
- Kristy Swanson as Dr. Kelli Raymond
- Coolio as Ice
- Jaimz Woolvett as Jerry Collins
- Rob Boltin as Emery Brousard
- Langley Kirkwood as Brett van Ryan
- Dennis Haskins as Captain Dale Landry
- Gideon Emery as Gene Bradley
- Charles Dumas as Hank Ellis
- Clive Scott as Grandpa Gautreau
- Nicholas Andrews as André Gautreau
- Hilton Myburgh as Vidrine
- Garth Collins as Lacombe, Oil Rig Worker
- Tumisho Masha as Rick (as Tumisho K. Masha)
- Shirley Davidson as Tricia
- Lord Jason Scott as Sgt. S. Davies Deputy

== See also ==
- List of killer shark films
