= Aurora Teagarden =

Fictional character created by Charlaine Harris

- Candace Cameron Bure as Aurora Teagarden
- First appearance: A Bone to Pick
- Last appearance: Death at the Diner
- Created by: Charlaine Harris
- Portrayed by: Candace Cameron Bure (2015–22); Skyler Samuels (2023–24)

Aurora Teagarden is a fictional character created by author Charlaine Harris. She is the protagonist of a series of eleven crime novels written from 1990 to 2017. Hallmark Movies & Mysteries began adapting the novels in 2014 for their original film series The Aurora Teagarden Mysteries with Candace Cameron Bure in the title role, part of the network’s "Mystery Wheel" umbrella series.

In the first book of the series, twenty-eight-year-old Aurora (Roe) Teagarden is a professional librarian at the Lawrenceton Public Library and belongs to the Real Murders Club, a group of true crime enthusiasts who gather monthly to study famous crimes from the history of their Georgia town.

== Aurora Teagarden book series ==
1. Real Murders (1990)
2. A Bone to Pick (1992)
3. Three Bedrooms, One Corpse (1994)
4. The Julius House (1995)
5. Dead Over Heels (1996)
6. "Deeply Dead" in Murder, They Wrote (1997)
7. A Fool and His Honey (1999)
8. Last Scene Alive (2002)
9. Poppy Done to Death (2003)
10. All the Little Liars (2016)
11. Sleep Like a Baby (2017)

== TV adaptation ==
On June 4, 2014, author Charlaine Harris announced on her Facebook page that the Aurora Teagarden books would be adapted into a series of two-hour films, starring Candace Cameron Bure and would air on the Hallmark Movies and Mysteries Channel. Bure announced her departure in April 2022, when she signed her own production deal with GAC Family, including a role as an executive with the company. In March 2023, Hallmark announced a prequel film with Skyler Samuels starring as a young Aurora Teagarden.

=== Characters ===
- Aurora "Roe" Teagarden (Candace Cameron Bure, films 1–18; Skyler Samuels, films 19–21) – a librarian in the small town of Lawrenceton, Washington (unlike the Georgia location of the novels) who runs the Real Murders Club. Over the series, she is in relationships with Arthur Smith, then Scott Aubrey, then Martin Bartell, before marrying Nick Miller in the 16th instalment. In the next film, Bure's penultimate, it is mentioned that her last name is now Miller.
- Sally Allison (initially Lexa Doig, later Kayla Heller) – a reporter with the local newspaper, Aurora's best friend, and a member of the Real Murders Club
- Aida Teagarden (Marilu Henner) – the town's real estate agent and Aurora's mother who disapproves of her daughter's involvement in solving murders
- John Queensland (Bruce Dawson) – an active member of the Real Murders Club who shares Aurora's passion for solving murders and later starts dating Aurora's mother
- Lynn Smith (Miranda Frigon) – a detective with the homicide division of the police force (later chief) who often finds Aurora annoyingly in the middle of her investigations
- Arthur Smith (initially Peter Benson, later Evan Roderick) – Roe's best friend and a detective with the burglary division of the police force who is married to Lynn Smith and briefly dated Aurora.
- Martin Bartell (Yannick Bisson) – a former CIA agent who moves to town, falls in love with Aurora, and later dates her.
- Nick Miller (Niall Matter) – a college professor who lives opposite Aurora, and helps her with her investigations; Psychology Professor at College. Engaged to Roe as of Heist and Seek, married Roe in Til Death Do Us Part.

=== Cast ===
List indicators

This section includes characters who will appear or have appeared in the series.

- An empty grey cell indicates the character was not in the film, or that the character's official presence has not yet been confirmed.
- ^{Y} indicates a younger version of the character.

Character	Title																				
Character	A Bone to Pick	Real Murders	Three Bedrooms, One Corpse	The Julius House	Dead Over Heels	A Bundle of Trouble	Last Scene Alive	Reap What You Sew	The Disappearing Game	A Game of Cat and Mouse	An Inheritance to Die For	A Very Foul Play	Heist and Seek	Reunited and It Feels So Deadly	How to Con a Con	Til Death Do Us Part	Honeymoon, Honeymurder	Haunted by Murder	Something New	A Lesson in Murder	Death at the Diner
Aurora Teagarden Miller	Candace Cameron Bure	Candace Cameron Bure	Candace Cameron Bure	Candace Cameron Bure	Candace Cameron Bure	Candace Cameron Bure	Candace Cameron Bure	Candace Cameron Bure	Candace Cameron Bure	Candace Cameron Bure	Candace Cameron Bure	Candace Cameron Bure	Candace Cameron Bure	Candace Cameron Bure	Candace Cameron Bure	Candace Cameron Bure	Candace Cameron Bure	Candace Cameron Bure Natasha Bure^{Y}	Skyler Samuels	Skyler Samuels	Skyler Samuels
Sally Allison	Lexa Doig	Lexa Doig	Lexa Doig	Lexa Doig	Lexa Doig	Lexa Doig		Lexa Doig	Lexa Doig	Lexa Doig	Lexa Doig	Lexa Doig	Lexa Doig	Lexa Doig	Lexa Doig	Lexa Doig		Lexa Doig Mia Shanks^{Y}	Kayla Heller	Kayla Heller	Kayla Heller
Aida Teagarden	Marilu Henner	Marilu Henner	Marilu Henner	Marilu Henner	Marilu Henner	Marilu Henner	Marilu Henner	Marilu Henner	Marilu Henner	Marilu Henner	Marilu Henner	Marilu Henner	Marilu Henner	Marilu Henner	Marilu Henner	Marilu Henner	Marilu Henner	Marilu Henner	Marilu Henner	Marilu Henner	Marilu Henner
John Queensland	Bruce Dawson	Bruce Dawson	Bruce Dawson	Bruce Dawson	Bruce Dawson	Bruce Dawson															
Arthur Smith	Peter Benson	Peter Benson	Peter Benson	Peter Benson	Peter Benson	Peter Benson	Peter Benson	Peter Benson	Peter Benson	Peter Benson	Peter Benson	Peter Benson	Peter Benson	Peter Benson	Peter Benson	Peter Benson		Peter Benson Tyler Cody^{Y}	Evan Roderick	Evan Roderick	Evan Roderick
Lynn Liggett-Smith	Miranda Frigon	Miranda Frigon	Miranda Frigon	Miranda Frigon	Miranda Frigon	Miranda Frigon	Miranda Frigon			Miranda Frigon	Miranda Frigon	Miranda Frigon	Miranda Frigon	Miranda Frigon	Miranda Frigon		Miranda Frigon	Miranda Frigon			
Macon Turner	David Ingram	David Ingram		David Ingram				Dean Marshall													
LeMaster Cane	Daniel Bacon	Julian Christopher	Julian Christopher	Julian Christopher																	
Lillian Tibbett	Ellie Harvie	Ellie Harvie	Ellie Harvie	Ellie Harvie	Ellie Harvie	Ellie Harvie	Ellie Harvie	Ellie Harvie	Ellie Harvie	Ellie Harvie	Ellie Harvie	Ellie Harvie	Ellie Harvie	Ellie Harvie	Ellie Harvie	Ellie Harvie	Ellie Harvie	Ellie Harvie			
Captain Burns	Craig March	Craig March	Craig March	Craig March	Craig March																
Bubba Rankart	Dave Collette			Dave Collette				Dave Collette			Dave Collette										
Maisie Schlumper	Darla Fay	Darla Fay						Darla Fay													
Robin Daniels		Robin Dunne					Robin Dunne														
Perry Dell		Scott Lyster	Scott Lyster	Scott Lyster	Scott Lyster		Scott Lyster														
Charlie Heard		Brad Harder	Brad Harder		Brad Harder	Brad Harder		Brad Harder	Brad Harder					Brad Harder	Brad Harder	Brad Harder	Brad Harder	Brad Harder			
Ted Allison			Fred Henderson								Fred Henderson										
Martin Bartell			Yannick Bisson	Yannick Bisson	Yannick Bisson	Yannick Bisson	Yannick Bisson														
Terry Sternholtz			Catherine Lough Haggquist		Catherine Lough Haggquist	Catherine Lough Haggquist	Catherine Lough Haggquist	Catherine Lough Haggquist	Catherine Lough Haggquist	Catherine Lough Haggquist		Catherine Lough Haggquist	Catherine Lough Haggquist	Catherine Lough Haggquist							
Larry					Devon Alexander			Devon Alexander													
Jason Dell						Keenan Tracey		James Rittinger	James Rittinger												
Lizzy Allison								Julia Benson			Julia Benson					Julia Benson	Julia Benson	Julia Benson			
Nick Miller									Niall Matter	Niall Matter	Niall Matter	Niall Matter	Niall Matter	Niall Matter	Niall Matter	Niall Matter	Niall Matter	Niall Matter			
Phillip Pifer									Dylan Sloane	Dylan Sloane	Dylan Sloane	Dylan Sloane	Dylan Sloane	Dylan Sloane	Dylan Sloane	Dylan Sloane	Dylan Sloane	Dylan Sloane			
Davis Mettle										Cole Vigue	Cole Vigue	Cole Vigue	Cole Vigue	Cole Vigue	Cole Vigue	Cole Vigue	Cole Vigue	Cole Vigue			
Gladys Allison-McCourt											Karen Kruper								Karen Kruper		
Detective Alistair Cook																			Steve Bacic	Steve Bacic	Steve Bacic
Professor Lindo																			Crystal Balint	Crystal Balint	Crystal Balint
Daniel Garcia																			Jordan Buhat	Jordan Buhat	Jordan Buhat

=== List of television films ===
No.	Title	Directed by	Written by	Original release date
1	"A Bone to Pick: An Aurora Teagarden Mystery"	Martin Wood	Teena Booth	April 4, 2015
Having inherited a large estate from a member of the now-defunct Real Murders Club, Aurora Teagarden is mystified by a mere acquaintance's gift of money, jewelry, and a two bedroom house with a skull hidden in the couch. Did the old lady kill someone and leave Aurora to solve the mystery or was she being framed? Aurora must figure it all out before her ex-boyfriend Arthur, the police detective, and her new love interest Aubrey, the episcopal priest, figure out what she's up to.
2	"Real Murders: An Aurora Teagarden Mystery"	Martin Wood	Teena Booth	July 26, 2015
Local crime buffs meet monthly in the small town of Lawrenceton, Georgia to analyze famous murder cases. In this Real Murders Club, they get all too close a look as one of their members is bludgeoned in exactly the same manner as the crime to be discussed that night. Aurora Teagarden, the town librarian, is not only a member of the club, a suspect in the murder but also a potential victim as other murders follow – each mimicking a famous crime. Aurora must work quickly to discover which of her fellow sleuths is the killer.
3	"Three Bedrooms, One Corpse: An Aurora Teagarden Mystery"	Lynne Stopkewich	Teena Booth	June 12, 2016
While Aurora Teagarden searches for her piece of the American dream, she decides to test the waters of the family business – real estate sales. Only thing is there's a dead body in the first house she shows to a businessman, Martin Bartell (Yannick Bisson) who is moving to town. When a second body shows up in another home, Aurora realizes there's more to the murders than she thought. Worried that the murderer could be one of the local real estate agents, Aurora recruits fellow Real Murders Club members John and Perry to help her with what turns into a case of art theft. She soon finds herself attracted to Martin who has also become a prime suspect on the police's list.
4	"The Julius House: An Aurora Teagarden Mystery"	Terry Ingram	Teena Booth	October 16, 2016
Ever since she got a sizable inheritance from an acquaintance, Aurora has wanted to buy a house. Her mother, Aida Teagarden, is her real estate agent. Against Aida's advice, Aurora finds what she believes is the perfect house in the country, five miles outside of Lawrenceton. It is the infamous Julius House where the family of three (father, mother, and their teenage daughter) had disappeared into thin air four years ago. As she begins moving in, Aurora is drawn to the mysterious disappearance of the family and starts searching for clues in the house.
5	"Dead Over Heels: An Aurora Teagarden Mystery"	Terry Ingram	Shelley Evans	March 19, 2017
Aurora and Captain Jack Burns never saw eye to eye but when he winds up murdered, she can't help but get involved despite being told by several people to stay away. The Captain's wife, Bess Burns (Leah Cairns) is suspiciously composed in the aftermath while new detective Pete Lambert (Jim Thorburn) thinks Martin is involved in Burns' death. Aurora finds Bess' sister and her colleague at the library, Lillian, attacked in the library and suspects that Captain Burns was on a case that got him murdered. As Aurora begins digging into the murder, her house is broken into and someone mysteriously leaves her flowers and then a kitten. Tensions also rise between Aurora and Martin as they near one year of being together. Meanwhile, Aurora tries to set up Sally with Tim Prentiss (Jeremy Guilbaut), Martin's colleague from the CIA who has recently moved to town.
6	"A Bundle of Trouble: An Aurora Teagarden Mystery"	Kevin Fair	Teena Booth	May 21, 2017
Regina, the long-lost niece of Aurora's boyfriend, Martin, turns up with a baby. Before Martin has a chance to reconnect with Regina, she disappears leaving a dead husband, Craig, on Aurora's front porch and her baby, Hayden, hidden in Aurora's bathtub. Aurora and Martin's investigation leads them to Regina and Craig's home in the neighboring town of Corinth, where Craig's parents and Regina's neighbors express bewilderment when told of Regina's newborn baby. Aurora works on balancing her relationship with Martin with her efforts to solve the murder of the baby's father and the disappearance of his mother.
7	"Last Scene Alive: An Aurora Teagarden Mystery"	Martin Wood	Teena Booth	January 7, 2018
Aurora's friend and mystery author, Robin Daniels, is back in town because his book is being made into a film. The lead character is based on Aurora herself. Martin is suspicious of Robin as he briefly dated Aurora in the past. Three days after the crew's arrival, the actress playing her, Celia Shaw, is found murdered in her trailer. Several people involved with the movie had problems with Celia. The plot thickens when the police find out that Celia was both poisoned and then clubbed. Meanwhile, since John moved away to be closer to his grandchildren, Aida gets friendly with the movie director. Another subplot has Martin preoccupied by the disappearance of his CIA partner, Rex, and he leaves for South America at the end of the film to look for him.
8	"Reap What You Sew: An Aurora Teagarden Mystery"	Terry Ingram	Teena Booth	April 15, 2018
When an old family friend, Poppy Wilson, returns to Lawrenceton, not everyone is happy. Poppy and her business partner Cara (Britt Irvin) are achieving new heights with their online venture but Poppy is found murdered. The list of suspects is long and includes Poppy's stepmother Nicole (April Telek) who she did not get along with, her boyfriend Dustin (Jesse Moss) who she had recently broken up with and Sally's cousin Lizzy (Julia Benson) who suspected Poppy was having an affair with her fiancé, Bubba Rankart (Dave Collette).
9	"Aurora Teagarden Mysteries: The Disappearing Game"	Terry Ingram	Teena Booth	July 29, 2018
The disappearance of her cousin Phillip (Dylan Sloane) and his roommate, following the suspicious death of the roommate's girlfriend, spur Aurora on to investigate. As well as enlisting the help of her friends, she is also assisted by handsome college professor Nick Miller (Niall Matter), who has recently moved in across the street and teaches psychology at Philip's college.
10	"Aurora Teagarden Mysteries: A Game of Cat and Mouse"	Mark Jean	Teena Booth	August 4, 2019
A break-in at the venue for a Real Murders Club meeting leads Aurora to investigate cryptic clues left at crime scenes. The clues are quotes from mystery novels and Aurora enlists the help of Professor Nick Miller and his colleague and friend Bree (Tammy Gillis), a forensic psychologist at the college. However, when those close to her are targeted, it seems murder may be the ultimate end, motivated by jealousy over her burgeoning relationship with Nick.
11	"Aurora Teagarden Mysteries: An Inheritance to Die For"	Michael Robison	Jim Head & Teena Booth	August 11, 2019
Aurora investigates the apparent poisoning of Sally Allison's aunt and her mother's friend, Gladys McCourt (Karen Kruper) who is poisoned at Lizzy Allison and Bubba Rankart's wedding. Her latest will leads to several benefactors doubting its authenticity especially when a large part of her estate and her successful company are left to Aida and Gladys' son and Sally’s cousin, Cade (Preston Vanderslice) is left only a small fortune. Suspects range from disgruntled son Cade to the suspicious caretaker Tannis (Alison Araya) and Gladys' former personal chef Jeremy (Jason McKinnon) who inherits more than most family members. Meanwhile, Aurora and Nick face some questions about their growing relationship as he suspects Aurora might be trying to keep him at a distance.
12	"Aurora Teagarden Mysteries: A Very Foul Play"	Martin Wood	Jim Head & Michael Vickerman	August 18, 2019
During a stage performance by Aurora and the Real Murders Club, an actual murder is committed in front of the live audience. With her cousin Phillip (Dylan Sloane) as the prime suspect, Aurora must investigate to clear his name.
13	"Aurora Teagarden Mysteries: Heist and Seek"	Peter Benson	Jim Head & Teena Booth	May 17, 2020
When a priceless crown is stolen during a benefit gala held by the Lawrenceton library, Aurora and the Real Murders Club must investigate who would kill to get their hands on it.
14	"Aurora Teagarden Mysteries: Reunited and It Feels So Deadly"	Martin Wood	Jim Head & Teena Booth	October 18, 2020
Newly engaged, Aurora and Nick attend her 20-year high school reunion. When the former Prom King, Jack Landon, is found stabbed to death and floating in the swimming pool. Aurora and the Real Mysteries Club work to solve the crime. Suspects are his old coach (who invested money with Jack but lost it), his high-school ex, Cassie (who has been on/off over the years despite Jack being married), his wife, Amy, (he has sued for divorce; his dying first would leave her with life insurance money), and an old class-mate, Parker, who was overheard arguing with Jack by Cassie in the location where he was stabbed. This is confirmed by Coach, but Parker denies this and appear to have no motive. There are also tensions between Amy and her mother-in-law. The mother-in-law has always preferred Cassie.
15	"Aurora Teagarden Mysteries: How to Con a Con"	Tony Dean Smith	Teena Booth	March 14, 2021
Still engaged, Aurora & Nick prepared for their wedding venues: cakes, church, & catering. Aurora comes to the rescue of her mother Aida. When one of Aida Teagarden's real estate clients is found murdered, Aurora and her fiancé, Nick, set out to solve the murder. After they discover that someone is operating an elaborate con artist scheme, Aurora, Nick and the members of the Real Murders Club go undercover in an operation to 'con a con' and solve the crime.
16	"Aurora Teagarden Mysteries: Til Death Do Us Part"	Martin Wood	Jim Head & Teena Booth	June 13, 2021
As Nick and Roe prepare for their wedding, a skull is found days before her wedding; when she finds out her father may be a suspect, Nick and Roe race against time to solve the case, before they walk down the aisle and say "I do"
17	"Aurora Teagarden Mysteries: Honeymoon, Honeymurder"	Martin Wood	Jim Head & Teena Booth	August 22, 2021
While on a "pre-honeymoon" getaway, Aurora and Nick discover a body, and as they get closer to finding out what really happened, danger knocks on their doorstep.
18	"Aurora Teagarden Mysteries: Haunted by Murder"	Martin Wood	Jim Head & Teena Booth	February 20, 2022
A murder investigation is reignited in a house that is considered haunted by the Lawrenceton locals and where years ago Aurora and Sally, as teenagers, discovered a body.
19	"Aurora Teagarden Mysteries: Something New"	Jessica Harmon	Teena Booth	June 9, 2023
Young Aurora Teagarden (Skyler Samuels) returns home to Lawrenceton after college to pursue her post-grad degree and finds herself embroiled in a mystery involving her friend Sally's (Kayla Heller) fiancée.
20	"Aurora Teagarden Mysteries: A Lesson in Murder"	Jessica Harmon	David Grelck	October 3, 2024
When a student from Aurora's true crime literature class is found murdered outside the diner where she works, Aurora takes it upon herself to figure out the real culprit.
21	"Aurora Teagarden Mysteries: Death at the Diner"	Jessica Harmon	David Grelck	October 10, 2024
When the owner of the diner where Aurora Teagarden works is suddenly killed, her new boyfriend (Jordan Buhat) becomes the primary suspect.

=== Production and filming ===
The films in the series are shot largely in Vancouver, British Columbia, while the waterfall seen in the opening sequence of many of the films is Chequagua Falls in the village of Montour Falls, Schuyler County, New York. And while the novels are set in the southeastern American state of Georgia, the TV-movies are set in the Pacific Northwestern state of Washington.

=== Broadcast ===
The films are broadcast in the United States on Hallmark Movies & Mysteries. Channel 5 took over the broadcast rights for the series in the UK., but doesn’t air them anymore, now they air on Great! Mystery and Great! Movies, as well as the Great! Player. Canada also airs the films on W Network, which acquired all the Hallmark Movies.

== Awards ==
Til Death Do Us Part received two Canadian Screen Award nominations at the 10th Canadian Screen Awards in 2022, for Best Actress in a Television Movie (Bure) and Best Actor in a Television Movie (Matter).
