= Crossfire Trail =

2001 television film by Simon Wincer

- DVD cover
- Genre: Western
- Based on: Crossfire Trail by Louis L'Amour
- Teleplay by: Charles Robert Carner
- Directed by: Simon Wincer
- Starring: Tom Selleck; Virginia Madsen; Wilford Brimley
- Music by: Eric Colvin
- Country of origin: United States
- Original language: English

Production
- Executive producers: Michael Brandman; Tom Selleck
- Producers: Thomas Kane; Steven Brandman
- Cinematography: David Eggby
- Editor: Terry Blythe
- Running time: 96 minutes
- Production companies: Brandman Productions; TWS Productions II

Original release
- Network: TNT
- Release: January 21, 2001

Crossfire Trail is a 2001 American Western television film directed by Simon Wincer, written by Charles Robert Carner, and starring Tom Selleck, Virginia Madsen, and Wilford Brimley. Based on the 1954 novel by Louis L'Amour, the film is about a wanderer who swears an oath to his dying best friend to look after his beloved wife and ranch, only to encounter another force who strongly desires the ranch and the woman for his own purposes.

Crossfire Trail premiered on TNT on January 21, 2001, to 12.5 million viewers, making it the most-watched made-for-cable film ever, until the premiere of High School Musical 2 in 2007.

This is the second collaboration between Wincer and Selleck, following Quigley Down Under in 1990. They reunited again for Monte Walsh in 2003.

== Plot ==
In 1880, Rafe Covington is with his best friend Charles Rodney on a vessel bound for San Francisco. Rodney is dying, having been severely beaten by the ship's captain. With his last breaths, Rodney makes Covington swear an oath to take care of his beloved Wyoming Territory ranch and his wife, Anne. After beating the captain to avenge Rodney's death, Covington and his two other friends, "Rock" Mullaney and "J.T." Langston, head off to Wyoming. After a long trek through the Rocky Mountains, they find the ranch long deserted and immediately set to work restoring it.

Covington heads into the local town to pick up supplies. He finds Anne and informs her of what happened, but she refuses to believe him, as it had been accepted that Rodney was killed by a Sioux war party a year previously. Anne is also being wooed by wealthy businessman Bruce Barkow, who essentially runs the town and secretly desires the ranch for his own purposes.

Covington befriends Joe Gill, an older cowboy who was a good friend of Rodney's, and calls Snake Corville a liar for the story of how Rodney was killed. Covington then rescues local Sioux Chief Red Cloud's daughter from the clutches of Mike Taggart, one of Barkow's hired men; Mike, his brother Luke, and their friend Snake Corville all become hostile to Covington in response. Covington and his friends also round up Rodney's scattered cattle and get the ranch going again, angering Barkow. Covington tries to convince Anne that he was there when Rodney died, and is there to look after the ranch and her, but she repeatedly refuses to believe him. Simultaneously, Barkow attempts to convince Anne that Covington is only interested in the ranch for himself.

One day, Covington, Rock, J.T., and Gill head into town for a drink, and Covington purchases a new Winchester Centennial rifle that was special-ordered for Rodney. Outside, an inebriated Mike challenges Covington to a duel. Covington tries to walk away, but when Mike draws his pistol and shoots, Covington returns fire with the rifle and kills him. Snake then attempts to ambush Covington from atop one of the buildings, but Covington notices and guns him down, too. With the stakes now raised, Barkow sends for Beau Dorn, an infamous gunfighter with an impeccable reputation.

The next day, Covington, Gill, Rock, and J.T. discover large volumes of petroleum oil on the ranch. When they arrive back at the ranch house, they find Barkow there with his thugs. Barkow gives Covington three days to clear out with J.T. and Rock, or else he will force them out. He offers Gill the chance to stay, but Gill openly sides with Covington. Dorn arrives in town and meets with Barkow; he agrees to kill Covington and his friends in exchange for a piece of the ranch for himself. That night, Barkow officially proposes marriage to Anne, but she neither accepts nor rejects his proposal.

When the three days run out, Barkow sends Dorn to the ranch, where he perches atop a hill with a sniper rifle. Anne also rides out to the ranch, and Covington shows her the pits of petroleum oil. Finally realizing Barkow's true intentions, Anne tells Covington she believes him and they kiss. Dorn opens fire with his rifle from afar, shooting J.T. in the heart and killing him. Barkow's thugs then steal Rodney's cattle and herd them into town. When Anne rides in and tells Barkow she believes Covington, he angrily beats her and forces the town's cowardly sheriff/justice of the peace to marry them in front of the townspeople, thereby giving him legal control over the ranch. Barkow then attempts to rape Anne in a hotel room, knocking her unconscious when she fights back.

Covington, Rock, and Gill hold a funeral for J.T., then load up their guns and ride into town to confront Barkow and Dorn. A furious gunfight ensues as Rock, Gill, and the town's general store owner take on Barkow and his thugs. Though Gill and the store owner are both shot and wounded, all of Barkow's men are gunned down, with Rock killing Luke by emptying his rifle into him. Meanwhile, Covington engages Dorn in a one-on-one shootout. Dorn appears to shoot Covington, but Covington plays dead and then shoots Dorn in the ankle and chest. Dorn slowly dies, and Covington holsters his weapon, only to be shot and wounded in the back by Barkow. Just as Barkow prepares to finish off Covington, Anne arrives and shoots him dead with Covington's rifle. With the battle over, the townspeople emerge from the buildings as Covington, Anne, Gill, and Rock reunite.

== Cast ==
- Tom Selleck as Rafe Covington
- Virginia Madsen as Anne Rodney
- Wilford Brimley as Joe Gill
- David O'Hara as Brendan "Rock" Mullaney
- Christian Kane as John Thomas "J.T." Langston
- Mark Harmon as Bruce Barkow
- Brad Johnson as Beau Dorn
- Barry Corbin as Sheriff Walter Moncrief
- Ken Pogue as Gene Thompson
- Joanna Miles as Melissa Thompson
- Patrick Kilpatrick as Mike Taggart
- Rex Linn as Luke Taggart
- William Sanderson as Dewey, The Bartender
- Daniel Parker as Taggart Gang Member (credited as Daniel T. Parker)
- Marshall R. Teague as "Snake" Corville (credited as Marshall Teague)
- Carmen Moore as Dancing Flower
- James Nicholas as Chief Red Cloud
- Glen Gould as Bear Killer
- Michael O'Shea as Charles Rodney

== Production ==
Filming took place in Calgary and at the CL Westerntown set and backlot in Cochrane, Alberta, Canada.

== Reception ==
Crossfire Trail received mixed reviews from critics, earning a 40% rating on Rotten Tomatoes. While the musical score and cinematography received praise, most critics suggested the film added nothing new to the Western genre as a whole.
