= Catherine Lough Haggquist =

Canadian actress

- Born: Vancouver, British Columbia, Canada
- Occupations: Actress, producer, entrepreneur
- Years active: 1986–present
- Spouse: Neil Haggquist

Catherine Lough Haggquist is a Canadian actress, producer and entrepreneur. She has more than 140 acting credits in film and television, including three seasons as Inspector Nora Harris on the science fiction television series Continuum and recurring roles in Iron Man: Armored Adventures, Supernatural and Motherland: Fort Salem.

== Early life ==
Lough Haggquist was born in Vancouver, British Columbia, and spent part of her childhood in the Canadian Prairies before her family returned to Vancouver when she was eleven. She is the daughter of a United Church minister and a Jamaican mother. She began acting while attending Eric Hamber Secondary School in Vancouver, later training at Langara College in Vancouver and with private acting studios. Her first set experience came as a stand-in for Holly Robinson Peete on 21 Jump Street, where she met director Peter DeLuise on her first day on set; fellow actress Brenda Crichlow, a high school classmate, subsequently brought her into her own talent agency.

== Career ==
Through the 1990s and 2000s, Lough Haggquist took recurring roles on Highlander and Dark Angel, and appeared in The X-Files, The Outer Limits, Smallville, the television movie Doctor Who (as Nurse Wheeler), Stargate SG-1 and Paycheck. She also held lead roles on the Canadian series The Unprofessionals and Rockpoint P.D.

In 2010, Lough Haggquist appeared as a Soldiers of the One martyr in the series finale of Caprica, and she voiced Roberta Rhodes in the animated series Iron Man: Armored Adventures between 2008 and 2012. She is best known for playing Inspector Nora Harris across ten episodes spanning the final three seasons of Continuum (2013–2015). She also played the Fairy Godmother on Once Upon a Time in 2011, a role that led to her first fan convention appearance, in London in November 2016. In the 2011 film Born to Fight, she played Principal Lee, a role that had originally been written for an older Asian man before she was cast in the part.

Beginning in 2015, Lough Haggquist originated the recurring role of Terry Sternholz, a real estate agent, in Hallmark's Aurora Teagarden film series; when the franchise brought her back for its 2017 installment, the character had been re-written as having run for office and become mayor of the fictional town of Lawrenceton. She went on to appear in seven Christmas-themed television movies, and had recurring roles on Supernatural between 2012 and 2020. In 2019, she appeared in the feature films Endless, alongside Alexandra Shipp and Famke Janssen, and Love & Oatmeal, with Ben Platt.

From 2020 to 2022, Lough Haggquist played General Petra Bellwether, chief intelligence officer of the United States' witch armed forces and mother of cadet Abigail Bellwether, across all three seasons of Freeform's Motherland: Fort Salem. In the show's third and final season, the character was promoted to general following the death of her predecessor. More recently, she has appeared in episodes of Fire Country and Tracker.

=== Biz Books ===
Lough Haggquist has said the bookstore grew out of her own teaching practice: early in her career she began developing courses on the structure of the film industry and on how freelance performers could navigate it, and assembled a collection of reference books for her students that became the store's founding inventory. She opened Biz Books in November 1996 in the 650-square-foot basement of the old Gastown Actors Studio building at 136 East Cordova Street in Vancouver, paying $500 a month in rent, as a storefront specializing in film, television, and theatre resources.

After roughly five years of about 20 percent annual sales growth, she relocated the store around 2000 to an expanded, 1,350-square-foot space at 302 West Cordova Street, at Cambie, paying about five times the previous rent. The move coincided with the collapse of Vancouver's "Hollywood North" production boom, which cost the store $100,000 in income; Lough Haggquist responded by expanding into classes and workshops, including a "How To Start..." series covering skills such as media relations and screenwriting. By 2007, the store carried roughly 8,500 titles and was generating close to $400,000 in annual sales, with online sales having begun that November. The store, staffed largely by working actors and run day-to-day for much of this period by manager Bronwen Smith, became a gathering place for the city's film industry; regulars included actors such as Hayden Christensen and Famke Janssen, and director Neil LaBute shopped there while in Vancouver to direct The Wicker Man. Rising commercial rents in Gastown contributed to Lough Haggquist's decision to leave the neighbourhood in 2010, after which the business adopted an "online and on location" model; it continues to operate as BizBooks.net.

=== Theatre ===
Lough Haggquist played Condoleezza Rice in David Hare's Stuff Happens at the Firehall Arts Centre in 2008. In June 2015, she played the detective Baylen in Classic Chic Productions' all-female staging of David Mamet's Glengarry Glen Ross at Vancouver's Beaumont Stage, directed by Rachel Peake; reviewers noted that the production cast its women in male dress to portray the play's exclusively male characters. Later that year, she played Shonda Cox, an administrative officer at a small-town jail, in the Canadian premiere of Jason Wells' The North Plan for Upintheair Theatre, a production that went on to win three Jessie Richardson Theatre Awards, including Outstanding Production, Small Theatre. Her other stage credits include The Learned Ladies at Western Gold Theatre.

=== Union and industry service ===
Lough Haggquist has served multiple terms on the executive board of the Union of British Columbia Performers, including as vice president, and as a national councillor of the Alliance of Canadian Cinema, Television and Radio Artists. As early as 1996, while serving as a union vice president, she led a $280,000 fundraising drive for the Gastown Studio Theatre Society to purchase its theatre space at 36 Powell Street in Vancouver, aiming to secure the venue for non-profit use. She has taught acting for about fifteen years and has separately mentored emerging actors one-on-one through Women in Film. In September 2020, she became the new owner and artistic director of White Rock's The Drama Class acting school, succeeding founder Michele Partridge, who retained a teaching role at the school, and has separately contributed to training programs at On The Mic Training, the Vancouver Institute of Media Arts, Capilano University, and ActorVan Studios.

== Personal life ==
Lough Haggquist and her husband, Neil Haggquist, a labour relations negotiator who has served as executive vice-president of the B.C. producers' branch of the Canadian Film and Television Production Association, marked their thirteenth wedding anniversary in May 2008, placing their marriage in 1995.

== Awards and nominations ==
Year	Award	Category	Nominated work	Result	Ref.
2008	Spotlight Awards for Women in Film and TV	The WIFTV Vancouver Special Jury Award	Career contribution	Won	
2013	UBCP/ACTRA Awards 2013	International Women's Day Honouree	Career contribution	Won	
2017	UBCP/ACTRA Awards 2017	Honorary Life Member Award	Career contribution	Won	
2020	UBCP/ACTRA Awards 2020	Lorena Gale Woman of Distinction Award	Career contribution	Won	

Lough Haggquist is a producer of Reel Women Seen, a short film that has won numerous awards including the 2018 Jury Choice Award at the Diversity in Cannes Short Film Showcase.

== Filmography ==
=== Film ===
Year	Title	Role	Note
2001	L.A.P.D.: To Protect and to Serve	Cashier	
2002	Life or Something Like It	Morning Show Hostess	
2003	Paycheck	Scientist	
2003	Moving Malcolm	Maid of Honour	
2003	Little Brother of War	Sonja Lee	
2004	Scooby-Doo 2: Monsters Unleashed	Reporter #2	
2005	Alone in the Dark	Krash	
2007	Aliens vs. Predator: Requiem	Tina	
2010	Tron: Legacy	Reporter #2	
2011	Born to Fight	Principal Lee	
2012	A Rendezvous	Jordan	Short
2013	Elysium	Representative Burrard	
2014	Godzilla	PO #1 Martinez	
2015	The Condenado League	Executive #1	Short
2016	Countdown	Lilly	
2016	The Confirmation	Officer Sue	
2018	BOULEVARD	Officer Nolan	Short
2018	The Ride Home	Dr. Wright	Short
2018	Fifty Shades Freed	Dr. Greene	
2019	Puppet Killer	Ms. Stevens	
2019	37-Teen	Dana	
2020	A Daughter's Ordeal		
2020	Endless	Helen	
2020	Broil	January Sinclair	
2020	H.appiness	Joy	Short
2021	Broken Diamonds	Angela Hopper	
2022	Crawlspace	Helen Masur	
2025	Bodycam	Ally Jackson	
2025	Borderline	Eleanor	

=== Television film ===
Year	Title	Role	Note
1992	A Killer Among Friends	Girl #2	
1993	No Child of Mine	Secretary	
1993	Sherlock Holmes Returns	Resuscitation Nurse	
1993	For the Love of My Child: The Anissa Ayala Story	Nurse #1	
1994	Snowbound: The Jim and Jennifer Stolpa Story	Paramedic	
1994	To Walk Again	Lt. Janet Potter	
1994	Struggle to Survive	Paramedic	
1995	Not Our Son	Nurse	
1996	Doctor Who	Nurse Wheeler	
1998	Floating Away	Young Nurse	
1999	Y2K	Passenger #1	
1999	Final Run	Passenger #3	
1999	Fatal Error	Teal's Assistant	
2000	Quarantine	Agent Pelitere	
2000	The Linda McCartney Story	Paris Restaurant Patron	
2002	The Secret Life of Zoey	Applicant #1	
2004	NTSB: The Crash of Flight 323	Secretary	
2006	Four Extraordinary Women	Karen	
2006	The Stranger Game	Barbara Leaf	
2007	Crossroads: A Story of Forgiveness	Chantal	
2007	Termination Point	Ellen	
2009	Sorority Wars	Hillary	
2010	Miracle in Manhattan	Clair	
2010	A Family Thanksgiving	Lindsay	
2011	Innocent	Detective Rory Gissling	
2011	Hunt for the I-5 Killer	Reporter	
2011	Collision Earth	Jennifer Kelly	
2012	A Bride for Christmas	Rhonda	
2012	It's Christmas, Carol!	Pam Jacobs	
2013	The Toyman Killer	Judge Mangold	
2013	Romeo Killer: The Chris Porco Story	Dr. Mary Dombovy	
2014	A Christmas Tail	Rosemary Kitchens	
2015	Angels in the Snow	Amy Tucker	
2015	Autumn Dreams	Judge Brown	
2015	Are You My Daughter?	Michelle Canning	
2015	Welcome Home	Sarah Grimes	
2015	Fatal Memories	Dr. Dubois	
2016	Every Christmas Has a Story	Lauren Foster	
2016	Three Bedrooms, One Corpse: An Aurora Teagarden Mystery	Terry Sternholz	
2017	Garage Sale Mystery: The Beach Murder	Kay	
2017	A Bundle of Trouble: An Aurora Teagarden Mystery	Mayor Terry Sternholz	
2017	Dead Over Heels: An Aurora Teagarden Mystery	Mayor Terry Sternholz	
2018	Jingle Around the Clock	Fiona	
2018	Christmas Pen Pals	Naomi	
2018	Falling for You	Debbie	
2018	Aurora Teagarden Mysteries: The Disappearing Game	Terry Sternholz	
2018	Reap What You Sew: An Aurora Teagarden Mystery	Mayor Terry Sternholz	
2018	The Sweetest Heart	Emma Beabot	
2018	Last Scene Alive: An Aurora Teagarden Mystery	Mayor Terry Sternholz	
2019	Mystery 101: Dead Talk	Vicky Lin	
2019	Random Acts of Christmas	Perry	
2019	Aurora Teagarden Mysteries: A Very Foul Play	Terry Sternholz	
2019	Aurora Teagarden Mysteries: A Game of Cat and Mouse	Terry Sternholz	
2020	Love and Glamping	Sabrina Galler	
2020	Aurora Teagarden Mysteries: Heist and Seek	Terry Sternholz	
2020	Aurora Teagarden Mysteries: Reunited and it Feels so Deadly	Terry Sternholz	
2021	A Kind Hearted Christmas	Amari Harris	
2022	The Wedding Veil	Sonya	

=== Television series ===
Year	Title	Role	Notes
1993	The Commish	Margie	Episode: "Sight Unseen"
1994	M.A.N.T.I.S.	Patricia	Episode: "Fire in the Heart"
1994	The X-Files	Dr. Richmond	Episode: "Tooms"
1994	Birdland	Admissions Nurse	Episode: "O.C.D.P.D. Blues"
1992–1995	Highlander: The Series	Marcia / Carol	4 episodes
1999	The Net	Dr. Meg Canter	Episode: "Last Man Standing"
2000	Seven Days	Stephanie	Episode: "Buried Alive"
2001	The Unprofessionals	Sadie Winters	1 episode
1995–2001	The Outer Limits	Eileen / Reporter	2 episodes
2000–2001	Dark Angel	News Anchor / Reporter	3 episodes
2001	Just Deal	Bonnie	Episode: "Women's Work"
2002	Smallville	Mary	Episode: "Ryan"
2002	American Dreams	Martha Reeves	Episode: "Pilot"
2002	Stargate SG-1	Technical Sergeant	Episode: "Prometheus"
2003	Just Cause	Diane Baker	Episode: "Buried Past"
2003	The Dead Zone	Persistent Reporter	Episode: "Valley of the Shadow"
2002–2003	Rockpoint P.D.	Sgt. Grace Harris	13 episodes
2003	Peacemakers	Isaac Evans' Wife	Episode: "Pilot"
2004	Traffic	Building Manager	3 episodes
2005	The L Word	Davina	Episode: "Lacuna"
2006	Kyle XY	Ms. Schultz	Episode: "This Is Not a Test"
2006	Killer Instinct	Bank Manager	Episode: "Fifteen Minutes of Flame"
2006	Reunion	Elise Dawson	Episode: "1994"
2007	The Flash	Luna	Episode: "Pilot"
2007	Traveler	News Reporter	Episode: "The Exchange"
2009	The Troop	Linda	Episode: "The Good, the Bad and the Ickie Doll"
2010	Caprica	STO Martyr #3	Episode: "Apotheosis"
2010	Psych	Lisa	Episode: "Extradition II: The Actual Extradition Part"
2010	Stargate Universe	Mary	Episode: "Sabotage"
2011	Once Upon a Time	Fairy Godmother	Episode: "The Price of Gold"
2011	Fringe	Lucy	Episode: "Stowaway (Fringe)"
2011	R.L. Stine's The Haunting Hour: The Series	Penelope	Episode: "Fear Never Knocks"
2012	Emily Owens, M.D.	Gloria	Episode: "Emily and... the Question of Faith"
2008–2012	Iron Man: Armored Adventures	Roberta Rhodes (voice)	12 episodes
2013	Bates Motel	Liz Morgan	Episode: "The Man in Number 9"
2013	Arctic Air	Rebecca O'Callaghan	Episode: "Secrets & Lies"
2014	Girlfriends' Guide to Divorce	Bookstore Lady	Episode: "Rule #23: Never Lie to the Kids"
2014	The 100	Council Member #1	3 episodes
2014	Spooksville	Ms. Clench	Episode: "Blood Drive"
2015	UnREAL	Judith	Episode: "Savior"
2015	The Whispers	Renee	3 episodes
2015	Proof	Ms. Malone	Episode: "Pilot"
2015	Motive	Theona Verdad	Episode: "Pilot Error"
2015	Backstrom	Detective Francis Dunne	Episode: "Bogeyman"
2013–2015	Continuum	Inspector Nora Harris	10 episodes
2016	Van Helsing	Beth	Episode: "Stay Away"
2016	Beyond	Dr. Suzanne Warren	Episode: "Pilot"
2016	Zoo	Dr. Nielsen	2 episodes
2016	The Ex You Can't Escape	Interview Show Host	Episode: "Part I"
2016	Almost Actors	Coach	Episode: "The Celebrity Guest"
2017	The Good Doctor	Dr. Mohan	2 episodes
2017	Project Mc2	Dr. Allison Crawford	3 episodes
2017	iZombie	Dr. Danforth	Episode: "Twenty-Sided, Die"
2018	Life Sentence	Elaine	2 episodes
2019	The Flash	Vickie Bolen	Episode: "Time Bomb"
2012–2020	Supernatural	Jules / Detective Glass / Stevie	5 episodes
2020	Another Life	Annette Mackenzie	4 episodes
2020	Project Blue Book	Reporter	Episode: "Close Encounters"
2020	When Calls the Heart	Marion Landers	Episode: "A Moving Picture"
2019–2021	Chesapeake Shores	Linda Nelson	8 episodes
2021	Riverdale	Mrs.Tate	1 episode
2022	Superman & Lois	Dr. Kit Faulkner	3 episodes
2020–2022	Motherland: Fort Salem	Petra Bellwether	22 episodes
2023	Nancy Drew	Brie	Episode: "The Danger of the Hopeful Sigil"
2023	My Life with the Walter Boys	Jean Young	
2024	Fire Country	Governor Kelly	
2024	Tracker	Ann	

=== Theatre ===
Year	Title	Role	Venue	Note
2008	Stuff Happens	Condoleezza Rice	Firehall Arts Centre	
2015	Glengarry Glen Ross	Baylen	Beaumont Stage	
2015	The North Plan	Shonda Cox	Upintheair Theatre	Production received three Jessie Richardson Theatre Awards
	The Learned Ladies		Western Gold Theatre	

=== Video ===
Year	Title	Role	Note
2004	The Thing Below	Anna Davis	
2017	Gigantic	Vadasi	Voice
