= Sweet Dreams (1996 film) =

- Genre: Drama; Mystery
- Written by: Bruce Miller
- Directed by: Jack Bender
- Starring: Tiffani Amber Thiessen; Amy Yasbeck; A Martinez
- Theme music composer: Dan Wool
- Country of origin: United States
- Original language: English

Production
- Executive producers: Tana Nugent Jamieson (as Tana Nugent); Diana Meehan; Lynne Tuttle
- Producer: Suzy Beugen
- Cinematography: David Geddes
- Editor: Mark Melnick
- Running time: 96 minutes
- Production companies: Bonnie Raskin Productions; NBC Studios; Vox Uburis Productions

Original release
- Network: NBC
- Release: September 16, 1996

Sweet Dreams is a 1996 television film directed by Jack Bender, written by Bruce Miller, and starring Tiffani Amber Thiessen as a woman who has no memory of her past after waking up from a coma. The film also stars Amy Yasbeck, Adolfo Martinez and David Newsom.

== Synopsis ==
After waking up from a coma, Allison Sullivan finds she has no memory of anything. As she begins to try to put the pieces together she learns someone is out to get her due to an affair she had with a Dr. Jack Renault whose wife Laura just had a baby named Sara. Allison begins speaking with other people and learns all is not as it seems. She tries to put everything together and learns something strange about a person she is supposed to trust.

== Cast ==
- Tiffani Amber Thiessen as Allison Sullivan
- A Martinez as Chief Doug Harrison
- Amy Yasbeck as Laura Renault
- David Newsom as Dr. Jack Renault
- Conchata Ferrell as Dr. Kate Lowe
- Scott Paulin as Richard Mateo
- Natasha and Tamera McPherson as Sara Renault
- Anna Hagan as Mitzi
- Sheelah Megill as Nurse Nancy Morrison
- Merrilyn Gann as Stevie
- Biski Gugushe as Nurse Scott
- Shaina Unger as young Allison
- Chelsea Hobbs as young Laura
- Kristy Cohen as Sharon
- Laura Owens as Cynthia Levenger

== Reception ==
John Martin of The Daily Dispatch called it "not completely stupid".
