= Cyborg Soldier =

- Directed by: John Stead
- Written by: John Flock; Christopher Warre Smets
- Starring: Rich Franklin; Tiffani Thiessen; Bruce Greenwood
- Release date: October 7, 2008
- Running time: 84 minutes
- Country: United States
- Language: English

Cyborg Soldier is a science fiction film released on October 7, 2008, directed by John Stead, and starring Rich Franklin, Tiffani Thiessen, and Bruce Greenwood.

== Plot ==
I.S.A.A.C. (Intuitive Synthetic Autonomous Assault Commando), played by former UFC Middleweight Champion Rich Franklin, is the first prototype of a secret "human weapon" program. Once a death-row inmate, he is now a genetically reconstructed, highly trained, deadly assassin whose body and mind have been modified to become a physically regenerative, intellectually superior human being.

While on the run, I.S.A.A.C. takes Deputy Lindsay Rearden (Tiffani Thiessen; Beverly Hills, 90210) hostage. Their lives are in jeopardy from military agents being led by robotics engineer Simon Hart (Bruce Greenwood; I, Robot; National Treasure: Book of Secrets). Deputy Reardon and I.S.A.A.C. work together to expose the military group constructing the super beings.
