= Shriek If You Know What I Did Last Friday the 13th =

- DVD cover
- Directed by: John Blanchard
- Written by: Sue Bailey; Joe Nelms
- Produced by: Stephen Nemeth; Andrew Ooi
- Starring: Coolio; Shirley Jones; Tiffani-Amber Thiessen; Tom Arnold
- Cinematography: David Miller
- Edited by: Richard LaBrie
- Music by: Tyler Bates
- Production companies: Sea Dragon Ltd. Rhino Films; Endless Entertainment, Inc. The Funny One
- Distributed by: Trimark Pictures
- Release date: October 17, 2000
- Running time: 86 minutes
- Country: United States
- Language: English
- Budget: $5 million

Shriek If You Know What I Did Last Friday the 13th is a 2000 American made-for-TV parody slasher film directed by John Blanchard. The film stars Tiffani-Amber Thiessen, Tom Arnold, Coolio and Shirley Jones. Several mid- and late 1990s teen horror films are parodied, as are slasher films from the 1970s and 1980s, including the Scream films, Friday the 13th (1980), Halloween (1978), A Nightmare on Elm Street (1984), and I Know What You Did Last Summer (1997), as well as other films and television series outside of the horror genre. Although many different films are parodied, the film follows the plot of Scream (1996) very closely. It is often compared to Scary Movie, a commercially successful spoof from the same year, which had as a working title Scream If You Know What I Did Last Halloween.

== Plot ==
While in her house alone teenager Screw Frombehind is attacked by "The Killer". While being chased, Screw accidentally runs into a bug zapper and is electrocuted. The killer's disappointed he was not the cause of her death, lights a cigarette, leading to melting his Jason Voorhees mask, which becomes his Ghostface mask.

The next day, new kid Dawson Deery registers at Bulimia Falls High School, meeting a new group of friends including Boner, Slab, Barbara, and Martina, to whom Dawson takes a liking, though he is unsure if she is a lesbian. While the group discusses the death of Screw, they remain certain they are safe at school, not noticing the chaos that surrounds them, including an anthrax bomb being built and the killer attempting to murder a student as well as making an attempt on the president's life.

The group encounters EmpTV News reporter Hagitha Utslay, who is covering a series of murders, having already written a best-selling pop-up book about them, and accuses Dawson as being the killer. They then meet Barbara's brother Doughy, an inept security guard who recently lost his job patrolling a shopping mall and is working to find the killer. However, he believes Screw's death was a harmless prank. As the group talks, they do not notice Hagitha's cameraman being murdered. As the day progresses, more and more students are murdered. While in class, each of the group receives a letter from the killer, revealing he knows a secret about them. Each of the group recalls a time when they were drunk-driving and hit a deer, before dumping it in the sea. This event leads them to keep their own secrets; Martina not giving her grandmother laxatives, Boner accidentally causing his brother to be killed in prison, Slab smoking his uncle's ashes, and Barbara accidentally removing the "do not remove tag" from a mattress.

Meanwhile, Hagitha and Doughy continuously flirt with each other. As the group meets up, Dawson gets a letter too, as he was in fact the one run over by the others while dressed up in a deer costume due to a hillbilly forcing him to wear it and do salt lick. The hillbilly died in an explosion caused by him farting in the fireplace. The group decides they should spend the night in a secluded house, so they decided to go to Slab's after school. As the day progresses, each of the group members are attacked but manage to escape. The killer confronts Principal Interest, but he electrocutes himself in a bathtub.

At night, everyone goes to Slab's party. Boner takes an unconscious girl up to a bedroom, attempting to lose his virginity. The killer attacks him, but Boner suffers a heart attack before the killer can murder him. Martina goes over the rules of a parody movie, before Barbara is chased outside by the killer. However, Barbara suffers an allergic reaction to bee stings before the killer can murder her. As the rest of the party people leave, Martina makes a move on Dawson, before they find Slab has abused steroids, which causes his head to explode. Martina and Dawson are then chased by the killer, as Hagitha and Doughy play strip poker nearby instead of investigating the murders.

Martina and Dawson defeat the killer as Hagitha and Doughy arrive. The killer is revealed as Hardy, Doughy's "evil twin cousin", whom Doughy is going to let get away with the murders, but Hagitha accidentally shoots Hardy before leaving Doughy for a pizza boy. Martina, Dawson and Doughy leave the house, where they find Boner still alive, due to him taking an entire bottle of viagra, allowing his blood to continue to pump after his heart attack. As Martina and Dawson leave, they get a call from the killer, but Dawson hangs up on him and he follows them.

After the end credits, there's a tag called "Where The Hell Are They Now?" that reveals events about Dawson and Martina, Slab, Barbara, Nurse Kevorkian, Mr. Buchanan and Resusci-Annie, Boner and his doctor (who is transgender), Mr. Hasselhof, Hagitha, Doughy, the Killer, and the movie's film crew, and that the high school has a new and improved killer.

== Cast ==
- Julie Benz as Barbara Primesuspect
- Harley Cross as Dawson Deery
- Majandra Delfino as Martina Martinez
- Simon Rex as Slab O'Beef
- Danny Strong as Boner
- Coolio as Principal Interest or the Administrator-Formerly-Known-As-Principal
- Aimee Graham as Screw Frombehind
- Tiffani-Amber Thiessen as Hagitha Utslay
- Tom Arnold as Doughy Primesuspect / Hardy
- Shirley Jones as Nurse Kevorkian
- Rose Marie as Mrs. Tingle
- David Herman as Mr. Lowelle Buchanan
- Mink Stole as Madame La Tourneau
- Chris Palermo as The Killer (voice)

== Production ==
=== Development ===
Trimark acquired distribution rights to the film in 1999, when it was known under the title I Know What You Screamed Last Semester. Trimark announced the film would be skipping a theatrical release in favor of a cable premiere on October 17, 2000, as part of USA Network's horror-themed film marathon Shriek Week. The film's title was eventually changed to Shriek If You Know What I Did Last Friday the 13th following heavy pressure from Miramax, which had exhibited aggressive legal action to anything even tangentially tied to Scream, including suing Columbia Pictures for perceived similarities between I Know What You Did Last Summer and Scream.

Principal shooting took place in Los Angeles from April 17 until May 18, 1999, months before Scary Movie started filming.

=== Parodies ===
The film features a variety of character parodies:

- Hagitha Utslay: Courteney Cox's character Gale Weathers in Scream. Her surname is "Slut" in Pig Latin.
- Doughy Primesuspect: David Arquette's character Dewey Riley in Scream.
- Barbara Primesuspect: Sarah Michelle Gellar's character Helen Shivers in I Know What You Did Last Summer and Rose McGowan's character, Tatum Riley, in Scream.
- Dawson Deery: James Van Der Beek's character Dawson Leery in Dawson's Creek.
- Administrator-Formerly-Known-As-Principal: a reference to artist Prince.
- Screw Frombehind: Drew Barrymore's character Casey Becker in Scream.
- Nurse Kevorkian: a reference to Jack Kevorkian, known as "Dr. Death".
- Mrs. Tingle: Helen Mirren's character Mrs. Eve Tingle in Teaching Mrs. Tingle.
- The Killer: Ghostface in Scream.
- Chucky Ray: a student that resembles the evil doll Chucky from Child's Play.
- Mr. Hasselhof, a swimming teacher: David Hasselhoff, who played Mitch Buchannon in Baywatch.

== Reception ==
=== Critical response ===
The film holds a 14% approval rating on Rotten Tomatoes, based on 7 critics' reviews.

Larry Getlen of FilmCritic.com gave the film a negative review, saying that it "drift[s] without a storyline to follow or a character to care about" and was riddled with "infantile sex and fart jokes or gags that are just plain lazy".

The film's only positive review came from Allmovie.com, giving the film 3½ out of 5 and writing: "As joke-a-minute spoofs go, this surprisingly genial, cleverly constructed parody is one of the best of the genre without a Zucker brother or Jim Abrahams in the credits".

== See also ==
- Student Bodies (1981) — A parody of horror movies
- Scary Movie (2000) — A parody of horror movies
- Stan Helsing (2009) — A parody of horror movies
