= Vanishing Point (1997 film) =

1997 television remake of the 1971 film

- DVD cover
- Genre: Action
- Based on: Vanishing Point by: Guillermo Cain; Malcolm Hart
- Written by: Charles Robert Carner
- Directed by: Charles Robert Carner
- Starring: Viggo Mortensen; Jason Priestley; Peta Wilson; Christine Elise; Keith David
- Music by: James Verboort
- Country of origin: United States
- Original language: English

Production
- Executive producer: Alan C. Blomquist
- Cinematography: Daryn Okada
- Editor: Marc Leif
- Running time: 91 minutes
- Production companies: Westgate Productions; 20th Century Fox Television

Original release
- Network: Fox
- Release: January 7, 1997

Vanishing Point is a 1997 American action television film written and directed by Charles Robert Carner and starring Viggo Mortensen, Jason Priestley, Peta Wilson, Christine Elise, and Keith David. A remake of the 1971 film, it aired on the Fox television network on January 7, 1997. It features the same model 1970 Dodge Challenger R/T as the original film.

== Plot ==
Jimmy Kowalski, a Gulf War veteran and former stock car racer, works as an automobile restorer and delivery driver at a shop in Idaho. He takes an assignment delivering a 1971 Plymouth Roadrunner to New Mexico, to pay his wife's mounting medical bills. While in New Mexico, he is offered another job: delivering a 426 Hemi-powered 1970 Dodge Challenger R/T to Salt Lake City, Utah. On the way, he's informed that his wife's already-difficult pregnancy has taken a turn for the worse, so he heads back home to Idaho, refusing to stop for police when flagged down for speeding.

An interstate chase develops. Throughout the rest of the journey he is pursued by a relentless Utah sheriff and an FBI agent who, while trying to make a name for himself and the organization after the incidents of Ruby Ridge and the Waco Siege, becomes convinced Kowalski is either running drugs or is a domestic terrorist. Kowalski is aided in his flight by a radio shock jock called "The Voice", a libertarian DJ with a Gadsden flag in his studio, who is constantly giving homilies on topics such as income taxes and government oppression. The Voice, intrigued by Kowalski's run across country, sets out to find the truth about Kowalski. As he does so, he discovers the truth of Kowalski's "drug run" and that Kowalski is really rushing home to be with his wife during her now dangerous pregnancy.

Along the way, Kowalski runs into the desert where he gets lost, blows a tire, and spends the night on an Indian reservation. He finds his way back onto the road where he continues on his way to Idaho, tricking the FBI into going the opposite direction of his intended path. However, as the day rides on he falls asleep and drives into the salt flats. A woman on a motorcycle finds him just after he wakes up and informs him he has damaged his oil pan. He follows her to her hideout, where he meets her boyfriend, who is hiding from the IRS and is at first suspicious that Kowalski is from the government. After the girl and Kowalski convince the boyfriend that Kowalski is "one of them", the boyfriend offers to ride 30 miles to try to locate a replacement oil pan. He arrives back after successfully finding one but warns Kowalski that the roads and intersections are teeming with police and agents. After they help Kowalski fit the pan, the couple offers to help him with a plan to run a roadblock.

Kowalski successfully gets through the roadblock by having flashing police lights mounted on his roof and rushing at the roadblock; in the dimming light the police think Kowalski's vehicle is another police car and hurriedly let him through. However, an officer fires a shot at the retreating Challenger and blows out the rear window. Afterward, Kowalski shuts off his headlights and vanishes into the woods, using night vision goggles he bought from the guy with the scanner. The police helicopter has infrared detectors, but Kowalski evades being seen by hiding the car under a large piece of tin. He awakens from a nightmare about his wife at 7:19 a.m., finds a phone booth, and calls the hospital, speaking to the same doctor as previously.

Kowalski then drives down the road to where the film began. Upon seeing the roadblock, he stops where we first saw him in the beginning. A flashback reveals that his wife died at 7:19 a.m., from kidney failure. He then drives his car into the roadblock at full speed. An epilogue by "The Voice" reveals that although the authorities claim he died in the crash and the body was never found, some witnesses claim Kowalski bailed out just before the crash and escaped authorities with the help of sympathetic onlookers. A scenario is given whereby his former Mexican friend finds Kowalski's tags and shows he is now living in the wilderness with his newborn daughter.

== Cast ==
- Viggo Mortensen as Jimmy Kowalski
- Christine Elise as Raphinia Kowalski
- Steve Railsback as Sergeant Preston
- Rodney A. Grant as Edward Sunsinger
- Peter Murnik as Gilmore
- James MacDonald as Assistant FBI Agent
- Paul Benjamin as Mose
- Geno Silva as Mike Mas
- John Doe as Sammy
- Peta Wilson as Motorcycle Girl
- Keith David as FBI Agent Warren Taft
- Jason Priestley as The Voice

== Production ==
Airport Road north out of Williams, Arizona doubled as Route 51 heading into Riddle, Idaho for the film's opening scenes and climax. The accompanying shots into the canyon with the winding road were filmed at Oak Creek Vista on Arizona's SR-89A.
