= Missy's Murder =

1991 non-fiction book

- Author: Karen Kingsbury
- Genre: Non-fiction
- Publisher: Dell Publishing
- Publication date: 1991

Missy's Murder: Passion, Betrayal, and Murder in Southern California is a 1991 non-fiction book by Karen Kingsbury and published by Dell Publishing. It concerns the murder of Missy Avila, in the San Fernando Valley region in Greater Los Angeles.

== Background ==
Kingsbury previously reported the Avila case for the Los Angeles Daily News. At the time of the publication of this work, which was her first book, she worked as a freelance journalist.

== Reception ==
Richard Lee Colvin of the Los Angeles Times criticized the overly-done reconstructions of conversations, the use of an "annoying narrative device of short chapters in which no names are used", and the sections about the history of the San Fernando Valley. Colvin argued that the story "has impact" despite the book's mistakes and that the author was "most sure of herself" while writing the sections of the book dealing with the trial. He stated the book was "clumsy", that it would disappoint "many readers", and concluded that "One comes to the end of the book, however, wishing that it had been written by a more experienced hand."

Publishers Weekly criticized the book, calling it "unreliable", "superficial", "sensationalistic", and "a poor example of true-crime writing".

In particular Publishers Weekly accused the author of blatantly trying to "idealize the Avila family". Colvin stated that the book, like many other true crime books, goes to "make a monster out of the killer and a saint out of the victim".
