= Lowell Park (novel) =

1990 novel by Mike Chapman

- Author: Mike Chapman
- Language: English
- Genre: Historical fiction
- Publication place: United States
- Pages: 95 pp

Lowell Park is a 1990-based historical novel, and authored by Mike Chapman. The book will be made into a movie of the same name by Empire Film Group.

== Plot summary ==
Set in 1990, Jenny Brix lives in Iowa City. She is a history buff. She even has a Ronald Reagan picture when he was in his 20s as a lifeguard! When she goes to a meeting, a very old professor has a heart attack. Panicking, she uses CPR on him, thus saving his life. After a few stops to the hospital, he asks her which US president she likes best. She answers Ronald Reagan. So then the professor tells her that she can go back in time and meet him. She is shocked, but the professor keeps telling her it's true. She finally believes him, sort of. The professor takes her to Dixon, Illinois, Reagan's childhood home. There the professor tells her she has 80 hours to stay out of the time zone, or her body will be used to the other time zones and can't come back to present day (1990). When she goes into the time machine, it actually is set on 1832, instead of 1932 (where she was going). She then meets Abraham Lincoln (who develops a little crush on her), and Chief Black Hawk during the Black Hawk War. After all of that is straightened out, she goes to 1932 with less than half the time left she started with. Once she gets there she sees a young, handsome Ronald Reagan going past her to save a person from drowning. She then gets some friends, Scooter and Betsy. They say there is a dance at Dixon's run down, old high school. There she dances with Ronald and his brother. While dancing with Ronald, she falls down the steps with him. They then get a crush on each other. After going on a few dates, she has to go to her original time zone. She and Ronald have a sad exchange (Ronald doesn't know about the time traveling) when she has to leave. Jenny then takes Scooter and Betsy to Lowell Park, where she shows them the time machine. She then leaves, leaving the others dumbfounded. When she comes back, professor says he is Scooter, and spent the rest of his life finding things about the time machine after she left until he finally made the time machine.

In the epilogue, Reagan visits Dixon the final time. He goes back to Lowell Park, where he spent 6 years as a lifeguard. He then sees a familiar face from the past (Jenny) near a tree. He shrugs it off and goes back visiting.

== Characters ==
- Jenny Brix - Main Character of the story. Goes back in past and meets Abraham Lincoln and Ronald Reagan.
- The Professor/"Scooter" Burns - A brilliant mind. Makes time machine after Jenny visits 1932.
- Ronald Reagan - Dates Jenny and is a lifeguard (future president)
- Betsy - One of Jenny's friends in 1932
- "Moon" Reagan - Ronald's brother

== How it originated ==
During Ronald Reagan's final visit to his childhood home, he met the author of this book. That helped him write a story about it. That is how Lowell Park came to life.

== Film ==
Lowell Park is being produced by Empire Film Group. It is to be directed by Charles Robert Carner.
