= Tiffani Thiessen =

American actress (born 1974)

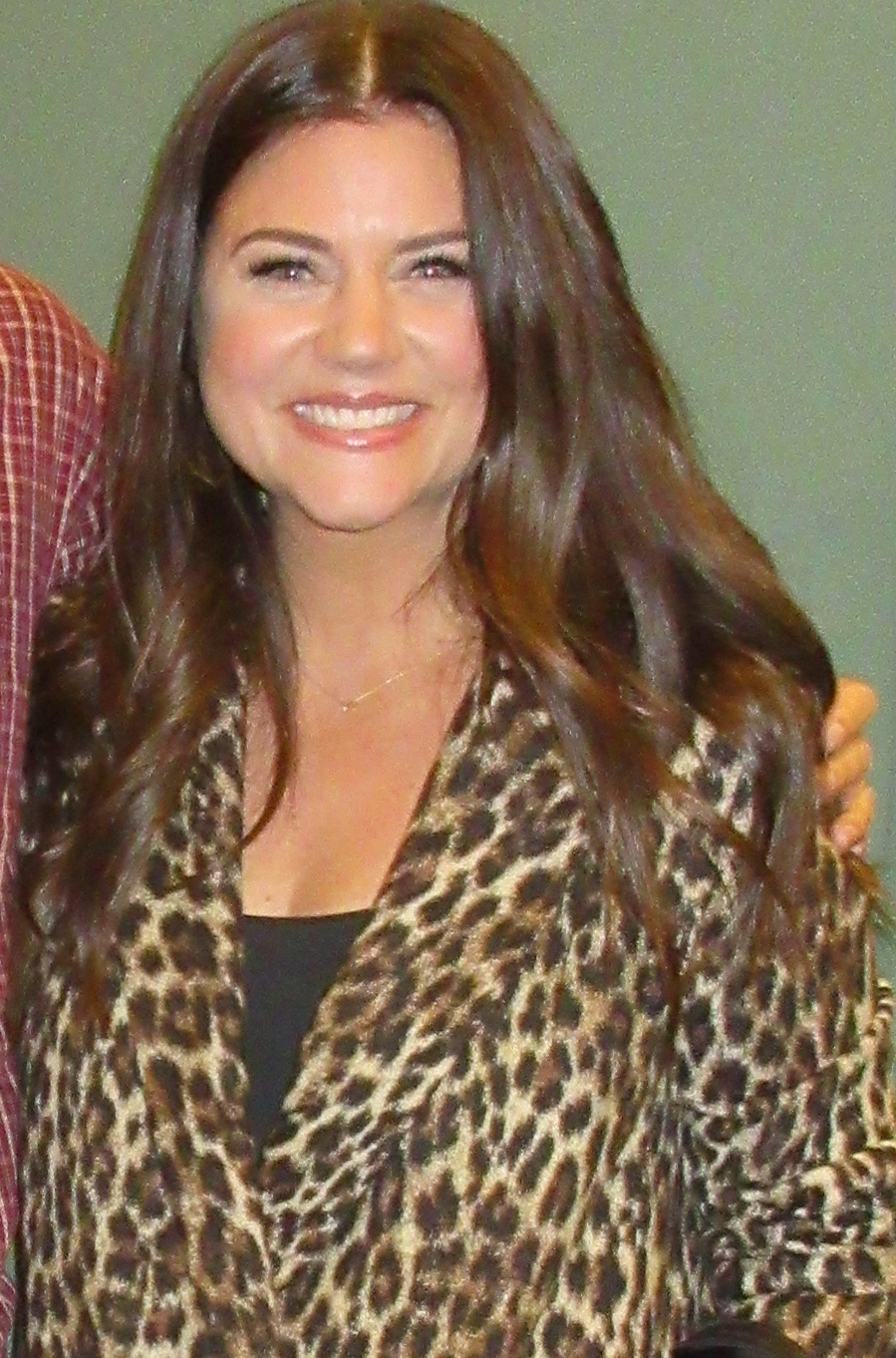
- Thiessen in 2018
- Born: Tiffani Amber Thiessen; January 23, 1974 (age 52); Long Beach, California, U.S.
- Occupations: Actress; model
- Years active: 1989–present
- Spouse: Brady Smith (m. 2005)
- Children: 2
- Website: tiffanithiessen.com

Tiffani Amber Thiessen (born January 23, 1974) is an American actress. Her roles as Kelly Kapowski on NBC's Saved by the Bell (1989–1993) and its spin-off media, and as Valerie Malone on Fox's Beverly Hills, 90210 (1994–1998) established her as a teen idol of the 1990s. As an adult, she has played Wilhemina 'Billie' Chambers in Fox's Fastlane (2002–2003), Natasha Drew in ABC's What About Brian (2007), Elizabeth Burke in USA Network's White Collar (2009–2014), and Lori Mendoza in Netflix's Alexa & Katie (2018–2020). For the latter, she earned a Daytime Emmy Award nomination.

Thiessen has appeared in several films, such as Son in Law (1993), Speedway Junky (1999), From Dusk Till Dawn 2: Texas Blood Money (1999), Love Stinks (1999), Ivans Xtc (2000), Shriek If You Know What I Did Last Friday the 13th (2000), The Ladies Man (2000), Hollywood Ending (2002) and Cyborg Soldier (2008). She directed the short film Just Pray (2005), for which she earned a nomination from the Tribeca Festival for Best Narrative Short. She hosted the Cooking Channel series Dinner at Tiffani's (2015–2017) and the MTV comedy clip show Deliciousness (2020–2022).

== Early life ==
Thiessen was born in Long Beach, California, the daughter of Robyn (née Ernest), a homemaker, and Frank Thiessen, a park designer and landscape architect. She has credited her brother, Todd, as one of her most important sources of inspiration, and her mother and grandmother as role models. Thiessen told InStyle magazine: "I'm a mutt. I have so much of everything in me, and half of it I don't even know. German on one side, Greek, Turkish and Welsh on the other. My mom is very olive-skinned; I get my blue eyes from my dad."

== Career ==
Thiessen participated in beauty pageants during her childhood and was crowned Miss Junior America in 1987. The following year, she appeared on the cover of Teen magazine, having won the magazine's "Great Model Search". In 1989, she was named Cover Girl's "Model of the Year", and landed her first role of Kelly Kapowski on NBC's television sitcom Saved by the Bell, starring until its end in 1993. The success of the show gave her career a boost and Thiessen received Young Artist Award nominations for Outstanding Young Ensemble Cast in 1990 and Best Young Actress Starring in an Off-Primetime Series in 1991 and 1993. Simultaneously, Thiessen guest-starred on series such as Married... with Children, Charles in Charge and Step by Step. In 1992, she starred in her first television movies Saved by the Bell: Hawaiian Style and A Killer Among Friends, making her film debut in Son in Law in 1993. She then continued with starring in spin-off Saved by the Bell: The College Years in its single season (1993–1994) and in television movie Saved by the Bell: Wedding in Las Vegas (1994), which marked the end of the original Saved by the Bell series.

In 1994, after her tenure on Saved by the Bell had ended, Thiessen landed the role of Valerie Malone in Fox's Aaron Spelling-produced hit teen-drama Beverly Hills, 90210, to fill the void after Shannen Doherty's departure. She was the first actress to directly join the main cast of the show and portrayed Valerie until 1998, when she left in the early episodes of the ninth season of the show. While starring in 90210, Thiessen began to take on continuous dramatic leading roles in television films: The Stranger Beside Me (1995) and She Fought Alone (1995), Sweet Dreams and Buried Secrets in 1996. After her departure from the show, she appeared in a number of films, including Speedway Junky (1999), From Dusk Till Dawn 2: Texas Blood Money (1999), Love Stinks (1999) and The Ladies Man (2000); she also guest-starred on NewsRadio (1999), Two Guys and a Girl (2000), Just Shoot Me! (2001) and Good Morning, Miami (2003–2004). In 2000, she was featured in the music video for "You're a God" by Vertical Horizon, portraying a beauty pageant contestant, in her first music video appearance. That year she also dropped her middle name which she had been including professionally for many years and is now credited as simply Tiffani Thiessen. Thiessen was Spelling's first choice to replace Doherty in the series Charmed in 2001, but she refused his offer because she was hoping the NBC pilot for Everything But the Girl would be picked up. The role eventually went to Rose McGowan.

Meanwhile, Thiessen starred in direct-to-video parody film Shriek If You Know What I Did Last Friday the Thirteenth (2000) and in television movie Everything But the Girl (2001), before appearing in the Woody Allen-directed film Hollywood Ending (2002) and starring in action-drama series Fastlane (2002–2003) as Wilhelmina 'Billie' Chambers, for which she received a Teen Choice Award nomination for Choice TV Actress – Drama/Action Adventure. In 2003, she launched her production company Tit 4 Tat Productions, producing and directing the short film Just Pray in 2005, which earned distinctions at several film festivals, including winning Best Score at the Rhode Island International Film Festival, an Academy Award qualifying festival. The original motion picture soundtrack album, co-produced by Thiessen and Al Gomes of Big Noise, was placed on the Official Ballot for the 49th Annual Grammy Awards by The Recording Academy in several categories including Best Compilation Soundtrack Album For Motion Picture, Television or Other Visual Media.

Later on, she starred in television movies Stroller Wars (2006) and Pandemic (2007), she joined the cast of ABC's drama What About Brian (2007) for its last five episodes and starred in the science fiction film Cyborg Soldier (2008). In 2008, she made her second music video appearance, this time for Ben Lee's "American Television". Thiessen appeared with her husband Brady Smith on the September 6, 2009 episode of season four of the reality show HGTV Design Star. Interior designer Lonni Paul, one of the final three contestants of the season, was given the task of redesigning Thiessen's guest bedroom with an eco-friendly theme; Thiessen and Paul now have a nursery furniture line called PetitNest. From 2009 through 2014, Thiessen appeared in the USA Network crime series White Collar as Elizabeth Burke.

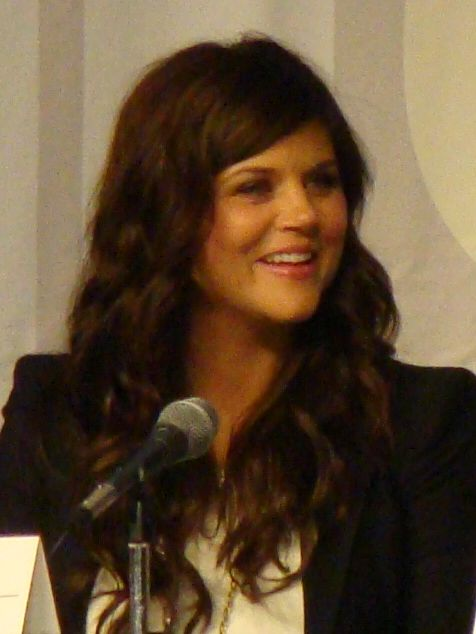
Thiessen at San Diego Comic-Con in 2010

On February 4, 2015, Thiessen reunited with Saved By the Bell co-stars Mark-Paul Gosselaar, Elizabeth Berkley, Dennis Haskins and Mario Lopez on The Tonight Show Starring Jimmy Fallon, in which they appeared in a Saved by the Bell sketch with host Jimmy Fallon. In the same year, Thiessen started hosting her own show on Cooking Channel called Dinner at Tiffani's, which ran until 2017.

On June 7, 2017, Thiessen was cast as Lori Mendoza, mother of the Mendoza family on the multi camera Netflix sitcom Alexa & Katie, which premiered its first two seasons on March 23 and December 26, 2018. In 2021, at the 48th Daytime Creative Arts Emmy Awards, she was nominated in the category of Outstanding Performance by a Supporting Actress in a Daytime Fiction Program.

In March 2020, it was announced that Thiessen would join the cast of the Saved by the Bell sequel series, reprising her role as Kelly Kapowski. She guest-starred in three episodes. The show premiered on NBCUniversal's streaming network Peacock beginning November 2020. In November, it was announced that Thiessen would host the MTV comedy clip show Deliciousness, a spinoff of that network's previous program, Ridiculousness.

== Charity work ==
In April 2013, she participated in the One Bag party as part of Earth Month, in which the Glad company promoted "clean, green living".

== Public image ==
Thiessen was a teen idol during the 1990s, starting from her role as cheerleader Kelly Kapowski on Saved by the Bell and then playing bad girl Valerie Malone on Beverly Hills, 90210. In a much-discussed moment, Justin Bieber appeared wearing a T-shirt with a photo of Thiessen in her Saved by the Bell days at the 2011 MuchMusic Video Awards, admitting his admiration for her. Basketball player Chris Paul also revealed publicly that he was a fan of Thiessen back then, when she sent him an autographed Saved by the Bell-era photograph of herself for his 29th birthday in 2014.

== Personal life ==
Thiessen dated her Saved by the Bell co-stars Mark-Paul Gosselaar and Mario Lopez.

In early 1992, Thiessen started dating her future 90210 co-star Brian Austin Green, introduced by mutual friend David Faustino. In 1999, she dated David Strickland, who died by suicide that year. From 2001 to early 2003, she was engaged to actor Richard Ruccolo, whom she had met during the Two Guys and a Girl run. She married actor Brady Smith on July 9, 2005, and they have two children: a daughter born in 2010, and a son born in 2015.

Thiessen served as maid of honor at 90210 co-star and best friend Jennie Garth's 2001 wedding to actor Peter Facinelli, with whom she co-starred on Fastlane. Garth and Thiessen's friendship has since come to an end. Her friendship with fellow 90210 star Tori Spelling also ended after Spelling's marriage to her first husband ended.

== Filmography ==
=== Film ===
Year	Title	Role	Notes
1993	Son in Law	Tracy	
1999	Speedway Junky	Wilma Price	
1999	From Dusk Till Dawn 2: Texas Blood Money	Pam	Direct to video film
1999	Love Stinks	Rebecca Melini / Juliette	
2000	Ivans XTC	Marie Stein	
2000	The Ladies Man	Honey DeLune	
2000	Shriek If You Know What I Did Last Friday the Thirteenth	Hagitha Utslay	Direct to video film
2001	A Christmas Adventure ...from a Book Called Wisely's Tales	Vixen (voice)	Direct to video film
2002	Hollywood Ending	Sharon Bates	
2005	Just Pray		Short; director
2008	Cyborg Soldier	Lindsey Reardon	

=== Television ===
Year	Title	Role	Notes
1989	Live-In	Girl	Episode: "Mommy and Me and Au Pair Make Three"
1989–1993	Saved by the Bell	Kelly Kapowski	Main role
1990	Charles in Charge	Jennifer	Episode: "There's a Girl in My Ficus"
1990	Married... with Children	Heather McCoy	Episode: "What Goes Around Came Around"
1990	The Hogan Family	Brooke	Episodes: "California Dreamin' Parts 1 & 2"
1992	Step by Step	Tina Gordon	Episode: "Daddy's Girl"
1992	Blossom	Ricki	Episode: "Driver's Education"
1992	Saved by the Bell: Hawaiian Style	Kelly Kapowski	Television movie
1992	The Powers That Be	Barbara	Episode: "The Intern"
1992	A Killer Among Friends	Jenny Monroe	Television movie
1993–1994	Saved by the Bell: The College Years	Kelly Kapowski	Main role
1994	Saved by the Bell: Wedding in Las Vegas	Kelly Kapowski	Television movie
1994	Burke's Law	Andrea Pierce	Episode: "Who Killed Romeo?"
1994–1998 & 2000	Beverly Hills, 90210	Valerie Malone	Main role (seasons 5-9); guest (season 10)
1995	The Stranger Beside Me	Jennifer Gallagher	Television movie
1995	She Fought Alone	Caitlin Rose	Television movie
1996	Sweet Dreams	Alison Sullivan	Television movie
1996	Buried Secrets	Annalisse Vellum	Television movie; also co-producer
1999	Cupid	Stephanie MacGregor	Episode: "Children's Hour"
1999	NewsRadio	Foxy Jackson	Episode: "Assistant"
2000	Two Guys and a Girl	Marti	Recurring role
2001	Everything But the Girl	Denise	Pilot movie
2001	Just Shoot Me!	Amy Watson	3 episodes
2002–2003	Fastlane	Wilhelmina 'Billie' Chambers	Main role
2003–2004	Good Morning, Miami	Victoria Hill	Recurring role
2006	Stroller Wars	Lainey	Television movie
2007	Pandemic	Kayla Martin	Miniseries
2007	What About Brian	Natasha Drew	Recurring role
2009–2014	White Collar	Elizabeth Burke	Main role
2012–2016	Jake and the Never Land Pirates	Misty the Wonderful Witch / Mermaid	Recurring role; voice
2014	Northpole	Chelsea Hastings	Television movie
2015	Hell's Kitchen	Herself	Episode: "Winner Chosen"
2015	The Tonight Show Starring Jimmy Fallon	Kelly Kapowski	Saved by the Bell sketch
2015–2017	Dinner at Tiffani's	Herself / Hostess	Executive producer
2017	American Housewife	Celeste	Episode: "Dude, Where's My Napkin"
2017	Food Network Star	Herself	Episode: "Summer Party Playoffs"
2018–2020	Alexa & Katie	Lori Mendoza	Main role
2019	Sugar Rush Christmas	Herself	Episode: "Here Comes Santa Claus"
2020–2021	Saved by the Bell	Kelly Kapowski Morris	Recurring role
2020–2022	Deliciousness	Herself	Clip show; host
2026	Coven Academy	Miss Graves	Main role

=== Music videos ===
Year	Song	Artist	Role	Notes
2000	"You're a God"	Vertical Horizon	Herself	
2008	"American Television"	Ben Lee	Herself	
2020	"Pick Her Up"	Hot Country Knights	Dierks Bentley's alter ego	

== Accolades ==
Year	Association	Category	Work	Result	Ref.
1990	Young Artist Awards	Outstanding Young Ensemble Cast	Saved by the Bell	Nominated	
1991	Young Artist Awards	Best Young Actress Starring in an Off-Primetime Series	Saved by the Bell	Nominated	
1993	Young Artist Awards	Best Young Actress Starring in an Off-Primetime Series	Saved by the Bell	Nominated	
2003	Teen Choice Awards	Choice TV Actress – Drama/Action Adventure	Fastlane	Nominated	
2005	Tribeca Festival Awards	Best Narrative Short	Just Pray	Nominated	
2021	Daytime Emmy Awards	Outstanding Performance by a Supporting Actress in a Daytime Fiction Program	Alexa & Katie	Nominated	
