= Karen Kingsbury =

American Christian novelist (born 1963)

- Born: June 8, 1963 (age 63); Fairfax, Virginia, U.S.
- Education: California State University, Northridge
- Occupation: Novelist
- Spouse: Don Russell (m. 1989)
- Children: 3 biological, 3 adopted
- Parent(s): Ted Kingsbury; Anne Kingsbury
- Website: www.karenkingsbury.com

Karen Kingsbury (born June 8, 1963) is an American Christian novelist born in Fairfax, Virginia.

She was a sports writer for the Los Angeles Times and later wrote for the Los Angeles Daily News. Her first book, Missy's Murder (1991), was based on a murder story that she covered in Los Angeles. During this time, she had an article published in People Magazine.

She has written or co-written almost 100 novels or short stories, and (as of 2008) has nearly 13 million copies of her novels in print. She is a #1 New York Times and USA Today best selling novelist with the last dozen books published topping bestseller lists. Some of her novels are being developed into movies by The Hallmark Channel, including The Bridge, A Time to Dance (2015), and Maggie's Christmas Miracle (2017). Her Baxter Family series was adapted into a television series by Lightworkers Media and Roma Downey in 2024 on Prime Video.

Kingsbury also does public speaking, and through national events she reaches more than 100,000 people each year.

== Early life ==
Karen Kingsbury is the oldest of five children born to Ted and Anne Kingsbury. Her family moved around a lot because of her father's job with IBM; ultimately the family would finally settle down in the San Fernando Valley (relocating from Michigan) when Karen was ten.

She studied at Los Angeles Pierce College, where her writing was encouraged by journalism professor Bob Scheibel. She graduated with a degree in journalism from California State University Northridge in 1986.

== Career ==
She worked for the Los Angeles Times as a sports writer and also reported on the crime beat.

In conjunction with Kingsbury, Liberty University announced in November 2017 the opening of the Karen Kingsbury Center for Creative Writing as part of its College of Arts and Sciences, where students can obtain a minor in Creative Writing. Kingsbury herself will teach several of the courses, both in residence at Liberty and online.

In June 2026, She signed with United Talent Agency for representation across all areas of her work.

== Personal life ==
She married her husband, Don Russell, on July 23, 1989. They joined a nondenominational church, and were baptized.

== Books ==
=== Series involving the Baxter Family ===
These sets of series is by far her most popular, and comprise nearly a quarter of her work. The Baxters are either the main characters, or play key roles, in each of the books. The series is set mainly in and around Bloomington, Indiana (where the Baxters grew up and some of them still live in the series).

==== Redemption series (with Gary Smalley) ====
- Redemption (2002)
- Remember (2003)
- Return (2003)
- Rejoice (2004)
- Reunion (2004)

==== Firstborn series ====
- Fame (2005)
- Forgiven (2005)
- Found (2006)
- Family (2006)
- Forever (2007)

==== Sunrise series ====
- Sunrise (2007)
- Summer (2007)
- Someday (2008)
- Sunset (2008)

==== Above the Line series ====
- Take One (2009)
- Take Two (2009)
- Take Three (2010)
- Take Four (2010)

==== Bailey Flanigan series ====
- Leaving (2011)
- Learning (2011)
- Longing (2011)
- Loving (2012)

==== Coming Home, The Baxter Family (a standalone work originally planned to end the series) ====
- Coming Home (2012)

==== Baxter Family Collection ====
- A Baxter Family Christmas (2016)
- Love Story (2017)
- In This Moment (2017)
- To the Moon and Back (2018)
- When We Were Young (2018)
- Two Weeks (2019)
- Someone Like You (2020)
- Truly, Madly, Deeply (2020)

==== Baxter Family Children series (with Tyler Russell, for ages 8-12) ====
- Best Family Ever (2019)
- Finding Home (2021)
- Never Grow Up (2021)
- Adventure Awaits (2022)
- Being Baxters (2023)

=== Other series ===
==== Angels Walking series ====
- Angels Walking (2014)
- Chasing Sunsets (2015)
- Brush of Wings (2016)
- Always and Forever (*)

==== Heart of the Story Series ====
- The Family of Jesus (2014)
- The Friends of Jesus (2015)
- The Followers of Jesus (*)
- First Hand Encounters of Jesus (*)

==== 9/11 Series ====
- One Tuesday Morning (2003)
- Beyond Tuesday Morning (2004)
- Remember Tuesday Morning (2008)

==== Lost Love series ====
- Even Now (2005)
- Ever After (2006)

==== Red Gloves series ====
- Gideon's Gift (2002)
- Maggie's Miracle (2003)
- Sarah's Song (2004)
- Hannah's Hope (2005)

==== Forever Faithful series ====
- Waiting for Morning (1999)
- A Moment of Weakness (2000)
- Halfway to Forever (2002)

==== Timeless Love series ====
- A Time to Dance (2001)
- A Time to Embrace (2002)

==== Cody Gunner series ====
- A Thousand Tomorrows (2005)
- Just Beyond the Clouds (2007)

==== Treasury of Miracles Books ====
- A Treasury of Christmas Miracles (2001)
- A Treasury of Miracles for Women (2002)
- A Treasury of Miracles for Teens (2003)
- A Treasury of Miracles for Friends (2004)
- A Treasury of Adoption Miracles (2005)
- Miracles - A 52 Week Devotional (2009)

=== Other works ===
==== True crime ====
- Missy's Murder (1991)
- Final Vows (1992)
- Deadly Pretender: The Double Life of David Miller (1993)
- The Snake and the Spider (1995)

These four books were Kingsbury's first novels. They were re-released in 2014 and included a letter from Kingsbury to her readers, explaining how writing these types of stories became too much for her to handle emotionally due to the darkness associated with them, and thus she changed genres to writing more general fiction with a Christian emphasis (which she titled, and has trademarked, as "Life-Changing Fiction").

==== Standalone novels ====
- On Every Side (2001)
- Oceans Apart (2004)
- Divine (2006)
- Like Dandelion Dust (2006)
- When Joy Came to Stay (2000)
- Where Yesterday Lives (2006)
- Between Sundays (2007)
- Shades of Blue (2008)
- This Side of Heaven (2009)
- Unlocked (2010)
- The Bridge (2012)
- The Chance (2013)
- Fifteen Minutes (2013)
- A Distant Shore (2021)
- Just Once (2023)
  - Although this book is not part of any of her Baxter Family series, one of the characters (Ashley) is briefly portrayed as the manager of an adult care home where the main character resides in the latter stages of her life. (In a "bonus chapter" sent to those who subscribe to Kingsbury's regular emails, Ashley is featured as the recipient of a pre-release copy of a book written by the granddaughter of the main character.)
- The Christmas Ring (2025)

==== Children's books ====
- Let Me Hold You Longer (2004)
- Let's Go On a Mommy Date (2008)
- We Believe In Christmas (2008)
- The Princess and the Three Knights (2009)
- Let's Have a Daddy Day (2010)
- The Brave Young Knight (2011)
- Far Flutterby (2012)
- Always Daddy's Princess (2013)
- Go Ahead and Dream (with Alex Smith) (2013)
- Whatever You Grow Up To Be (2014)

==== Gift books ====
- Forever Young (with Pat Williams) (2005)
- Be Safe Little Boy (2006)
- Stay Close Little Girl (2006)
- Forever My Little Boy (2016)
- Forever My Little Girl (2016)

==== E-shorts ====
- The Beginning (prequel to The Bridge) (2012)
- I Can Only Imagine (2013)
- Elizabeth Baxter's 10 Secrets to a Happy Marriage (2015)
- Once Upon A Campus (2016, expanded 2018)

== Music ==
Karen Kingsbury co-wrote her first song, "Walls" with Gary Baker and Richie McDonald; it appeared on McDonald's inspirational album, I Turn to You and hit Christian and Country radio in January 2009.

She wrote the song, "Tell Me to Breathe", that was included on the album I Can Do This by Marie Osmond.

Kingsbury also wrote "Miracles Happen", a Christmas song sung by country musician Richie McDonald, which now appears on McDonald's CD, If Every Day Could Be Christmas.

== Filmography ==
Year	Title	Based on a novel/book by	Writer	Producer	Notes
2009	Like Dandelion Dust	Yes	No	Co-producer	theatrical film
2015	Karen Kingsbury's The Bridge - Part 1	Yes	No	Executive	Hallmark Channel TV Movie
2016	Karen Kingsbury's The Bridge - Part 2	Yes	No	Executive	Hallmark Movies & Mysteries TV Movie
2016	Karen Kingsbury's A Time to Dance	Yes	No	Executive	Hallmark Movies & Mysteries TV Movie
2017	Karen Kingsbury's Maggie's Christmas Miracle	Yes	No	Executive	Hallmark Movies & Mysteries TV Movie
2023	Karen Kingsbury's A Thousand Tomorrows	Yes	Yes	Executive	Pure Flix original series
2024–present	The Baxters	Yes	No	Consulting	TV series
2024	Someone Like You	Yes	No	Executive	Theatrical Film
