= List of Graceland episodes =

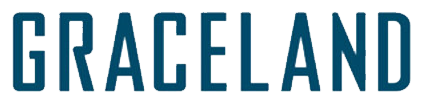

Graceland is an American police drama television series created by Jeff Eastin that premiered on the USA Network on June 6, 2013. A group of undercover agents from various law enforcement agencies in the United States, including the DEA, the FBI, and ICE, live together in a confiscated Southern California beach house known as "Graceland". Rookie FBI agent Mike Warren is assigned to the house fresh out of Quantico training.

On October 1, 2015, USA Network canceled Graceland after three seasons. During the course of the series, 38 episodes of Graceland aired, between June 6, 2013, and September 17, 2015.

== Series overview ==
| Season | Episodes | Originally released | |
| Season | Episodes | First released | Last released |
|---|---|---|---|
| 1 | 12 | June 6, 2013 | September 12, 2013 |
| 2 | 13 | June 11, 2014 | September 10, 2014 |
| 3 | 13 | June 25, 2015 | September 17, 2015 |

== Episodes ==
=== Season 1 (2013) ===
| No. overall | No. in season | Title | Directed by | Written by | Original release date | Prod. code | U.S. viewers (millions) |
|---|---|---|---|---|---|---|---|
| 1 | 1 | "Graceland" | Russell Lee Fine | Jeff Eastin | June 6, 2013 | BDV179 | 3.32 |
Despite graduating first in his class and requesting a post in Washington, new FBI agent Mike Warren is assigned to southern California to be trained in undercover operations by the enigmatic Paul Briggs. After meeting the FBI, DEA, and ICE agents who share a beach house headquarters, Mike begins his first day with a drug buy and then has to agree to kill someone on behalf of a Russian gang. At the end of the day, he learns that his true assignment is to investigate Briggs, who has already saved his life.
| 2 | 2 | "Guadalajara Dog" | Russell Lee Fine | Jeff Eastin | June 13, 2013 | BDV101 | 2.77 |
Mike meets his secret case manager Juan Badillo, who urges him to get more involved in one of Briggs' operations. Briggs is trying to infiltrate the organization of a crime boss named Bello, and Mike has the idea of selling Bello's men some cop-killer bullets obtained by Jakes in a customs case. Briggs uses Mike in a complex plan to complete the sale (and thus establish their credibility with Bello), but recover the bullets and incidentally take down another major criminal as well, freeing DEA agent Paige from a difficult position. Mike tries to covertly report to Juan during this operation, leading Briggs to confront him about who he is talking to. The title refers to the specialty menu item sold by a food truck frequented by the agents.
| 3 | 3 | "Heat Run" | Renny Harlin | Stephen Godchaux | June 20, 2013 | BDV102 | 2.27 |
Briggs and Mike meet with Bello and appear to convince him that his man Eddie, not they, were responsible for the loss of the bullets. Briggs' inquiry about who Mike was talking to remains unanswered. DEA agent Lauren is ending the undercover assignment with a Russian gang that got her partner Donny shot in the pilot episode. Briggs organizes a joint operation against the Russians based on Lauren's information but finds her unreliable and takes steps to keep Graceland secure. Paige introduces Mike to Abby, an attractive law student. Charlie severs relations with an eccentric confidential informant.
| 4 | 4 | "Pizza Box" | Sanford Bookstaver | Daniel Shattuck & Kiera Morrisette | June 27, 2013 | BDV103 | 2.33 |
Bello enlists Mike to train his men in firearms. Eddie attempts to convince Bello that Mike is not what he seems but is ultimately unsuccessful. Meanwhile, Paige finds unusually high-grade marijuana being sold on the street and enlists Jakes and Johnny in a plan to prove that a rural grower (a woman who has a history with Jakes) is exceeding the limits on legal cultivation. This operation falls apart when Johnny's cover identity as a Mexican gang member is penetrated. Charlie makes her famous tomato sauce, and Mike has another date with Abby.
| 5 | 5 | "O-Mouth" | Renny Harlin | Matthew Negrete | July 11, 2013 | BDV104 | 1.88 |
Briggs and Charlie have made contact with a dealer named Quinn, using old identities from a time when they were lovers, and plan to use Quinn to get to a larger dealer named Odin. Charlie's unreliable former informant Whistler knows Quinn; they first avoid him to avoid being exposed, but are eventually forced to use Whistler to vouch for them. Meanwhile, Mike demands that Juan tell him the basis for the FBI's suspicion of Briggs, and learns that he appears to be skimming a portion of the heroin seized in cases. He resolves to gain Bello's confidence to set up a large seizure and test Briggs' honesty, and finally succeeds in becoming Bello's personal bodyguard.
| 6 | 6 | "Hair of the Dog" | David Straiton | Andrew Colville | July 18, 2013 | BDV105 | 1.90 |
Charlie is forced to inject heroin (a firing offense in the FBI) to escape from Quinn; Briggs takes her to a safe house to hide her withdrawal symptoms, but the next day she is called to report to a superior on the incident. Briggs helps her take a small amount of heroin to handle the interview, and Johnny takes the blame for the failed operation. The DEA capture a smugglers' submarine with no drugs in it. Mike learns from Bello that the drugs were on a torpedo that the sub jettisoned. He introduces Johnny (actually a Navy diver who nearly became a SEAL) to Bello as someone who can recover the torpedo. While Johnny is underwater, Bello tells Mike he plans to kill Johnny when he surfaces. Briggs then has Johnny fake his own death with the torpedo's booby trap, also secretly recovering the drugs. Mike, enraged as he also thought Johnny was dead, suspects that Briggs has taken some of the drugs and follows him to San Diego, where it turns out he is attending a Narcotics Anonymous meeting.
| 7 | 7 | "Goodbye High" | Russell Lee Fine | Joe Henderson | July 25, 2013 | BDV106 | 2.02 |
After the meeting, Briggs explains to Mike how some years before, on an unauthorized mission to Mexico, he was captured by the dreaded Caza cartel assassin known as Jangles, forcibly given heroin, then released. He kept this secret from the FBI, but Mike reports it to Juan, who promises to help Briggs. Charlie is unable to find any new leads to Odin, whom apparently no one has ever seen. Bello is short of heroin after the loss of the torpedo, and may have to cut his product, killing many users. Briggs instead has Mike suggest to Bello that he buy from Odin rather than Caza, offering Briggs as a go-between. In a one-on-one meeting with Bello, with his audio link cut off, Briggs claims to be Odin but does not mention this when briefing Charlie. Meanwhile, Paige and Johnny urge Mike to break up with Abby, but Jakes (after conversations with the mother of his child and her current partner) says he should try to maintain the relationship, which he does. "Goodbye high" is the term Briggs uses to describe the heroin shot left for him by Jangles when he, Briggs, was set free.
| 8 | 8 | "Bag Man" | Renny Harlin | Ryan Scott | August 8, 2013 | BDV107 | 2.22 |
Briggs/Odin begins his commerce with Bello, leaving bags of heroin (taken from a large stash in his secret safe house) and never picking up the bags of cash Bello leaves in exchange (as they are watched by the others). Caza send a hit team to one of Bello's distribution centers, killing several of his employees, but one of their men is captured. Bello tortures and maims him before Mike saves his life and sends him back; he tells them that Jangles is coming for them. Mike brings Abby to Graceland against the rules, and she sees enough to scare her off for good. Charlie is suspicious of the audio cutoff in the Briggs-Bello meeting; she and Johnny search the safe house (where Briggs appears to be about to shoot up) but do not find him or the hidden stash. Mike interrupts the next heroin delivery to force Bello to meet Odin again. Briggs prepares a way for Bello to meet him in spite of the surveillance, and gives Bello the keys to the safe house. To cover the escape of "Odin" he attacks Mike from behind and subdues him before he can be seen, though he suffers badly bruised ribs that he conceals from the others.
| 9 | 9 | "Smoke Alarm" | Paul Holahan | Aaron Fullerton | August 15, 2013 | BDV108 | 2.01 |
Mike discovers that Juan has placed a bug on him. Confronted, Juan tells him why he is really after Briggs: he believes that Briggs started a fire that killed five FBI agents, including Briggs' trainer, at the time when Briggs claimed to Mike that he was captive in Mexico. Mike rejects this theory and walks away. Briggs rents a motel room, using a credit card linked to Odin, and places a camera, disguised as a smoke alarm, in it. Both Charlie and Mexican federal agent Rafael Cortes find the room, and they agree to work together to find both Odin and Jangles. Briggs learns from Johnny that Charlie suspects him to be linked to Odin. Bello is holed up in a safe house, expecting Jangles as part of a general war with Caza. One of his men tells Caza where he is, but Briggs fortuitously overhears this. Jangles attacks the safe house, killing both Bello's men and the team watching it. He captures Bello and begins torturing him when Mike interrupts them. Briggs leads an FBI team that fails to catch Jangles but arrests the badly injured Bello and Mike (the latter to preserve his cover). Cortes appears to also be the man who attacked the safe house. In the hospital, Mike tells Paige that he was sent to investigate Briggs, and she refuses to talk to him further. While Briggs is drinking on the beach, Juan confronts him dressed as Jangles, recording his intentions first. They fight and in the struggle Juan is shot with his own gun.
| 10 | 10 | "King's Castle" | Charlotte Sieling | Daniel Shattuck | August 22, 2013 | BDV109 | 2.18 |
Briggs buries Juan in the desert, believing him to be Jangles. A senior FBI agent calls in Mike, tells him of Juan's disappearance and the fact that Juan may have been wearing a wire, and asks Mike to investigate whether Briggs killed Juan. Mike then tells all this to Briggs, including that he has been investigating Briggs all along. He is satisfied that Briggs never knew Juan, but a computer check afterward tells Briggs just who he has killed. Meanwhile, Bello will not give up Odin's identity to Charlie without full immunity. Charlie sends the still-recovering Mike into prison in the hope that Bello might talk to help him, but Briggs sabotages this plan by arranging that Bello see Mike and Charlie together, thus blowing Mike's cover. Charlie tells Cortes/Jangles her suspicion that Odin is an FBI agent, but does not give him that agent's name. Johnny arranges an unwelcome surprise party for Jakes' birthday, and the two come to blows when Jakes comes home after failing to reconcile with his ex-wife.
| 11 | 11 | "Happy Endings" | Sanford Bookstaver | Joe Henderson & Andrew Colville | September 5, 2013 | BDV110 | 1.90 |
The hunt is on for Juan's car, on the assumption that it contains the last recording he made. Briggs asks Jakes' help to find it and get rid of it; he reluctantly agrees after Briggs tells him the true story of Juan's death. Jakes finds evidence that the car was stolen off the street. They locate the likely thief, a petty criminal named Clayton already known to Briggs. Mike and Paige independently trace the car to Clayton. Briggs finds Clayton and asks him for work, using his prior undercover persona. Clayton agrees to use him when he robs a massage parlor the next day, using Juan's car for the getaway. Mike arrives and manages to insert himself into this plan in place of Jakes. Briggs arranges with Jakes to give him time to take the recording from the car when the robbers are arrested, but Mike foils this by handcuffing Briggs to a wall during the robbery. Mike arrests Clayton when they reach the car, but the recording is gone. Meanwhile, Johnny locates Quinn for Charlie and she visits him, bringing Cortes/Jangles as her partner because Quinn has seen Johnny. She gets alone with Quinn and savagely beats him, blaming him for Whistler's death. Briggs takes a backpack from behind a wall in Graceland and leaves for parts unknown.
| 12 | 12 | "Pawn" | Russell Lee Fine | Jeff Eastin | September 12, 2013 | BDV111 | 2.05 |
Mike puts out an order to detain Briggs, but Johnny does not try to stop him leaving and Jakes drives him to the docks. There, Briggs meets with Quinn, who knows him as Odin and is anxious since he has heard that Jangles is after him. Briggs sells him a new identity and watches him get on an outbound freighter. He then drives to where Juan is buried and recovers a key from the body. Clark, the FBI official, interviews the remaining Graceland members and tells them the house will be closed if Briggs remains at large. Cortes/Jangles tells Charlie he is returning to Mexico, and invites her to visit him at his rented beach house. Briggs figures out that Cortes is Jangles and watches him meet with Charlie. Mike and Paige kiss but she tells him she is not the answer to his loneliness. Mike concludes that Briggs has not left the country and asks Jakes for help; he says no but covertly leaves him a burner phone number that Briggs gave him. Briggs follows Jangles to his house and overpowers him in a fight, but Charlie arrives and forces him at gunpoint to let him go. She realizes too late that Cortes is Jangles, and Jangles ties them both up and begins torturing Charlie. Mike, who has been tracking the burner phone, then arrives and kills Jangles in a shootout. The FBI concludes that Jangles killed Juan (since Briggs was able to add Juan's key to Cortes' key chain before the fight), and that Odin has fled to Ecuador (since Quinn is there using a new identity linked to Odin), so the house is safe. Briggs tells Mike that Jangles got the identity of the Caza mole (Briggs' supervisor) from Briggs by putting him through heroin withdrawal. He also tells the others about his heroin addiction. Mike accepts a transfer to a prestigious post in Washington, leaving on good terms with the others. Some time later, Briggs phones Mike and asks him to come to Graceland for a "vacation", as "there is something I didn't tell you". Meanwhile, two teenagers find a tape deck with Juan's recording in a pawn shop in Marina del Rey.

=== Season 2 (2014) ===
| No. overall | No. in season | Title | Directed by | Written by | Original release date | Prod. code | U.S. viewers (millions) |
|---|---|---|---|---|---|---|---|
| 13 | 1 | "The Line" | Russell Lee Fine | Jeff Eastin | June 11, 2014 | BDV201 | 1.56 |
Mike has a theory that Caza is using commercial buses to bring vast quantities of drugs into the US. His Washington boss lets him investigate for a while, but closes his operation down just as Briggs calls from California suggesting he take a vacation there. Briggs has learned from an arms dealer named Leon that two men are searching for Mike, in his persona as Bello's ex-marine bodyguard. Briggs and Mike plan to capture these men and use them to take down higher levels of Caza. Their first attempt fails when Leon tries to cut Briggs out of the deal. The suspects name a time and place for Briggs to hand over Mike, and over Briggs' objections they go to the meeting, where Mike is captured and tortured by asphyxiation until the others can rescue him. They ask him about a bus line, and Charlie's analysis of their tattoos suggests that they were not Caza members after all. Mike asks his boss for resources to investigate this new lead on the bus theory, and he is given the Graceland team. Meanwhile, Briggs and Charlie are again lovers, Jakes is shopping for an apartment for him and his son, and Charlie is conducting surveillance on Juan Badillo's widow, Kelly.
| 14 | 2 | "Connects" | Stephen Surjik | David Simkins | June 18, 2014 | BDV202 | 1.39 |
Briggs reaches out to Caza contacts and is offered a solo meeting in Mexico which turns out to be with the head of the entire cartel. He offers a reduction of FBI heat on Caza in exchange for learning who kidnapped Mike; he is later told that it was the rival Solano cartel. Charlie is enraged at Briggs for taking such a risk and at Mike for allowing it. Mike begins a new operation by having Charlie attempt to embed herself with the Solano leader's psychopathic son, but she does not go through with the first attempt. Mike also helps Paige successfully wrap up her outstanding DEA case, and she invites him to share a shower. Charlie is watching Kelly because of her own guilt over not detecting Jangles, which she believes led to Juan's death and Kelly's relapse into alcoholism. Briggs introduces himself to Kelly as a fellow alcoholic and distracts her from drinking for a night. Jakes tells Johnny about his plan to leave the house, take a desk job, and make a new life including his son, but the boy's mother takes out a restraining order against him.
| 15 | 3 | "Tinker Bell" | Sheree Folkson | Daniel Shattuck | June 25, 2014 | BDV203 | 1.27 |
Jakes returns to the house drunk and clashes with Zelanski, the new DEA agent who had been given his room. Mike decides to keep Jakes on the team in spite of his continued drinking and assigns him to look for patterns in surveillance footage of the CalCoast bus line. At the same time Johnny successfully embeds himself with Carlito Solano, and his sister Lucia, by bringing Carlito some antique pistols and then reacting steadily when Carlito impulsively shoots one of his aides. Paige visits a Solano dealer with Briggs and asks to buy a kilo of drugs, hoping to follow him to the Solano distribution chain. The suspicious dealer stabs Paige in the hand but agrees to supply the drugs in a few days. Jakes notices that the buses regularly carry teenage white girls, with identical pink backpacks, into the US from Mexico. Paige meets with one of the girls, Lina from Ukraine, and (thanks to her knowledge of Russian from an earlier assignment) learns that she is carrying balloons full of drugs in her stomach. She promises to help her and puts a cel phone in the backpack for the next leg of her journey, but finds only the backpack and phone in a trash can at her destination. Since the driver of her first bus is clearly implicated, Jakes follows that bus to a garage, where it undergoes something other than its scheduled maintenance.
| 16 | 4 | "Magic Number" | Marc Roskin | Aaron Fullerton | July 9, 2014 | BDV204 | 1.16 |
Briggs learns that Kelly has yet to receive death benefits for Juan, since his body was never found. With Briggs' help, Charlie gets her the money through an elaborate fraud: they arrange and then bust a large drug deal, tell the FBI that Kelly was their informant, and forge a new letter to accompany the reward check, saying that it is a death benefit. Jakes gets a job at the bus depot, using his real alcohol issues as part of his cover. He arranges an opportunity for Mike to have a team dissect the suspect bus #118, but they find nothing. But Jakes later learns that more than one bus is using number 118, and that something is going on with the waste oil from these buses. Meanwhile, Johnny has an unpleasant clubbing experience with Carlito, and Paige finds evidence that the eastern European girls are being auctioned as sex slaves after being used as drug mules. Mike's DC girlfriend Jess gets herself placed in charge of Mike's operation, at considerable risk to herself, in order to keep it from being shut down for lack of progress.
| 17 | 5 | "H-A-Double-P-Y" | Sanford Bookstaver | Ryan Scott | July 16, 2014 | BDV205 | 1.04 |
Johnny walks in on a fight between Carlito and Lucia and punches Carlito to break it up. When he returns to apologize, it becomes clear that Carlito has feelings for Johnny, and Johnny develops the relationship in order to get Carlito to pick up the next shipment of contraband (hidden in oil drums) personally with him. That shipment is Mike's last chance to expose the bus line's smuggling, because Jess has come to Graceland to shut down the operation. She pulls the backup team off of Paige's case for the final takedown; Paige demands that Mike use his sexual relationship to get Jess to restore it, but he cannot go through with it. Jakes' son Daniel finds him from the court papers, and they have an outing together (with the help of a prostitute Jakes has befriended) before taking him home. Paige asks Jakes to serve as her backup on a last attempt to expose the sex trafficking ring. She finds one of the girls on the bus, and gets her to wear a wire, but before the traffickers pick the girl up she dies from the bursting of one of the drug balloons. Paige decides to replace her, swallowing the remaining balloons herself, unaware that she now has no backup at all because Jakes has been arrested for violating his restraining order. Just as Carlito and Johnny are about to make the pickup, Carlito is warned of the setup by an unknown party, aborts the transaction, and has the contraband blown up. Mike and Jess conclude that they have been betrayed by one of their own.
| 18 | 6 | "The Unlucky One" | David Barrett | William Rotko | July 23, 2014 | BDV206 | 1.46 |
Paige is taken to the building where the girls are held, and a man named Sulla removes the balloons and apparently accepts her identity. There she finds Lina and they make one unsuccessful attempt to escape. Mike takes Lawrence, the bus depot manager, to a secure location unknown to the other people involved in the compromised takedown. He and Briggs torture the recovering Lawrence by pouring liquor down his throat, and he eventually agrees to validate Mike as a customer for the sex slave ring. Mike is admitted to the facility and "buys" Paige, who is furious when she realizes that Mike does not intend to buy Lina or take down the ring, which is his only remaining link to the Solanos. Mike releases Lawrence and advises him to leave town, but he is murdered at his house in the style of drug cartel hits. After meeting with a detective from the LAPD Anti-Gang Task Force, Mike concludes that the leak came from there, and that the whole task force is corrupted by the Solanos. Jess urges Mike to declare victory on the bus operation and return to DC, but he decides to remain in California, breaking off their relationship.
| 19 | 7 | "Los Malos" | Sanford Bookstaver | Carla Ching | July 30, 2014 | BDV207 | 1.20 |
Mike begins a two-pronged investigation of Sid. He has Briggs join the task force, posing as a transfer from the El Paso police, and Briggs' loyalty and bravery in a drug bust impresses Sid so that he recruits him into his inner circle. Meanwhile, Charlie discovers that Sid has unusual interest in a small branch bank. With a counterfeit $100 bill, Mike provokes a Secret Service investigation which allows him and Charlie to learn that Sid has dozens of safe deposit boxes there, presumably filled with cash. Mike suggests arranging and then busting a robbery of that bank, seizing Sid's money as evidence. Briggs agrees and says that he and Charlie know some likely bank robbers. Paige, with Jakes' help, stakes out the building where the girls are held. They observe another "sale" and follow the buyer until he is alone, whereupon they free the girl and Paige beats him. They also intercept a phone call from Carlito ordering Sulla to suspend operations; Paige is concerned about the fate of the girls in the meantime, but Mike still won't close the ring down without more conclusive evidence tying it to the Solanos. With Carlito away, Johnny visits Lucia only to be captured and beaten by two men who are holding her while waiting to buy some assault rifles from Carlito, who no longer has them. A Solano operative from Mexico arrives to help Lucia, and in a gunfight he and both gunmen are killed. Johnny and Lucia flee, and Johnny asks his mother (who does not know he is in the FBI, and with whom he has not spoken in three months) to harbor them. They spend a pleasant evening together, but when Jakes finds out he urges Johnny to take Lucia somewhere else for his mother's safety. Johnny enters his old bedroom intending to wake her and do so, but instead stays and kisses her.
| 20 | 8 | "The Ends" | Alrick Riley | David Simkins | August 6, 2014 | BDV208 | 1.16 |
Briggs and Charlie meet with their old acquaintance Billy and his logistics expert Amber. Charlie is impressed with Amber and gets her to join the bank robbery without Billy, once Charlie sticks up a bar with a shotgun to prove her bona fides. Briggs' work with Sid is interrupted by a call from Kelly, who is in the midst of a suicide attempt. Briggs helps her along with Sid, who had him followed, but she figures out that he is really a cop who somehow knew Juan. He assures her that Juan is dead but cannot tell her more, and she hits him. Briggs lies to Charlie about the resulting facial injury, and later hallucinates Kelly's face in place of Charlie's during sex. Mike now plans to sell the Solanos on a new distribution method to replace the busses, one that he will control. He announces that Lucia is a person of interest in the triple homicide, and asks Johnny to take her to her father in Mexico; she reluctantly agrees. Sid decides to end his relationship with the Solanos and "cash in his chips". At Paige's insistence, Mike tries to buy all the girls with FBI money, but Sulla will not disobey his orders from Carlito. Mike brings a down payment in a briefcase and agrees to stay with it in Sulla's compound until Carlito rescinds his order. Jakes acquires a cargo plane from a government yard to be the new smuggling method.
| 21 | 9 | "Gratis" | Larry Teng | Daniel Shattuck | August 13, 2014 | BDV209 | 1.27 |
Planning for the bank robbery continues. After an episode of morning nausea, Charlie leaves Briggs and Graceland to stay with Amber. There she learns that Amber's planned driver knows her, and after Briggs arrests the driver she replaces him with Jakes. Johnny and Lucia reach the Solano family compound in Tecate and find Carlito already there. Johnny is able to pitch his cargo plane idea to the senior Solano in spite of Carlito's resentment. Inside the sex slave compound, Mike interferes with a sexual assault on Lina by Sulla, whereupon Sulla fatally stabs Lina and his guards prevent Mike from retaliating. Mike leaves the compound with the body, then stages an attack on him and escape by Lina for Paige's benefit, then returns to the compound and uses cremation equipment he found there to eliminate the body. A concerned citizen, who came across Juan's tape recording in the second episode, turns it in to a detective in the Anti-Gang Task Force.
| 22 | 10 | "The Head of the Pig" | Larysa Kondracki | Aaron Fullerton & Mike Goldberg | August 20, 2014 | BDV210 | 1.06 |
In Mexico, Jakes and Johnny demonstrate the cargo drop plan for Carlos Solano, but it fails. Carlos turns back to Carlito and his cruise ship plan, and asks Johnny to leave after a farewell dinner. After two weeks' failed search for Lina, Paige asks Briggs to take down the sex slave operation, but her team takes orders only from Mike. Briggs tells Sid that Paige is an FBI agent attempting to link Sulla to the Solanos. Sid tells this to Carlos, who is enraged that Carlito was trafficking in women behind his back. He beats Carlito at the dinner, and gives Johnny a second chance. This succeeds and Johnny is sent back to the US to set up the air smuggling operation, his status with Lucia still unresolved. Sid plans an LAPD raid on Sulla, and Paige arranges for Mike to be away. But Mike learns from Johnny that Carlos knows about Sulla, and returns to try to save Sulla as his only remaining link to the Solanos. In the raid, Sulla and all his employees are killed and the remaining girls are freed. Sid has a brief chance to kill Mike as well, but Paige finds them before he does. The LAPD team, including Briggs, are hailed as heroes, and Mike cannot convince his superiors that they were actually executing potential liabilities for the Solanos. Mike's only hope now is that a successful bank robbery will force Sid into an illegal act that Briggs, now fully in his confidence, will witness. Charlie is still training with Amber for the robbery; she and Briggs now both know that she is pregnant. An unknown party phones Briggs and plays him back Juan's tape.
| 23 | 11 | "Home" | Duane Clark | Ryan Scott & Chris Masi | August 27, 2014 | BDV211 | 1.28 |
Briggs first thinks that Sid has the tape, but after meeting with him concludes that Mike has it. He diverts a film shoot to the area of the planned bank robbery, forcing a change in Amber's plan. They will assault the bank the next day in broad daylight with a larger force wearing animal masks, and Charlie recruits the entire Graceland team to participate. She again makes tomato sauce, but the "family dinner" collapses in recriminations. That night Charlie awakens Briggs from a dream in which he has killed and buried Mike, but he still does not tell her about Juan. Briggs tells Amber that he suspects Mike of planning to escape with the money. The robbery goes smoothly, and as Briggs planned Amber is about to shoot Mike, but at the last minute he distracts her instead and she escapes with some of the money. Mike taunts Sid with the remainder, which is seized as evidence. Briggs takes Charlie for a drive, intending to show her Juan's body. But when he hits a deer on the way, Charlie reveals that the LAPD detective gave her the tape and then drives off, leaving him alone with the dead deer. Meanwhile, Johnny reveals his love for Lucia to the others and plans to return to Mexico and rescue her as he promised.
| 24 | 12 | "Echoes" | Russell Lee Fine | Daniel Shattuck & William Rotko | September 3, 2014 | BDV212 | 1.14 |
Shortly after Briggs returns home, Charlie rebuffs him, wanting nothing to do with him for the time being. Briggs approaches Sid for any new developments, and is asked to tag along with the rest of the Gang Task Force for a "trip to Mexico." Mike is called in to the FBI headquarters to address Sid's attempt to file a court case against him, and Sid then surreptitiously provokes him into a fist-fight. Johnny and Jakes mark a large shipment of money to be delivered to Solano. Johnny rents a cheap motel in Mexico in preparation for extracting Lucia. Before Lucia leaves, she steals the briefcase of marked cash meant for Sid and hands it to Johnny at the motel. Paige receives a call from Immigration that Lina has been found, but the detainee is actually Lina's sister, Irina, who has come in response to a letter apparently written by Lina and posted from Arizona. After viewing the letter, Paige deduces that Mike did cover up Lina's death and has Irina deported back to Ukraine. After a doctor's exam, Charlie gives the recovered audio tape to Mike and confesses her pregnancy, asking him to not harm Briggs while discussing their options on what to do with the evidence. Utilizing a tracking device planted on Mike's torn suit during the fight, Sid infiltrates Graceland, steals a handgun belonging to Mike, and discovers Briggs' identity before leaving. Briggs leaves Los Angeles with the Task Force, while the rest of the Graceland team are preparing their operation in Mexico. Before committing to the joint operation, Charlie is asked by Amber to meet at a designated meeting spot, where she is ambushed and kidnapped by Amber's newly hired crew.
| 25 | 13 | "Faith 7" | Russell Lee Fine | Daniel Shattuck | September 10, 2014 | BDV213 | 1.23 |
Johnny confesses to Lucia that he is an FBI agent, and the pair return to the compound with the money she stole. However, they are then kidnapped and held at gunpoint by Carlito, who watched Dale switch the marked bills in the previous episode. Carlito ultimately orders Johnny to keep the airplane scheme running in exchange for Lucia's life. Briggs learns that Charlie is missing and abandons the Gang Task Force in Mexico to save Charlie from Amber and her money-laundering partner; Charlie has undergone some torture but she is alive and still pregnant. When Sid makes a bomb threat to the FBI office, the FBI team watching the Solanos withdraws but Mike goes ahead to the compound against orders. There he finds a gunfight in progress; he joins it, is wounded by a stray bullet, and then finds a wounded Sid and both Carlos Solano and the rest of the LAPD team dead. He sees that Sid and others were shot with Mike's stolen gun to frame him, and flees back to the US. Paige and Dale investigate Lina's letter, and the ICE forensic lab determines from fingerprints that it was genuinely written by Lina and posted from Arizona. Mike solicits Briggs's help in getting a false I.D. Paige brings the I.D. to Mike, and apologizes to him for not believing him, whereupon Mike makes a closing comment about "it being better that (the family) believes Lina is in a better place." A resentful Paige willingly tells Sid of Mike's whereabouts. During a team-building speech given by Paul, Paige walks out of the room, and tells Briggs what she's done. However, Sid successfully asphyxiates Mike in his hospital bed by squeezing shut his ventilator's oxygen tube, and disappears before Briggs and the alerted nurses arrive at Mike's room where he is coding and unresponsive. Briggs notices the signs of a struggle.

=== Season 3 (2015) ===
On November 11, 2014, Graceland was renewed by USA Network for a third season consisting of 13 episodes.

| No. overall | No. in season | Title | Directed by | Written by | Original release date | U.S. viewers (millions) |
|---|---|---|---|---|---|---|
| 26 | 1 | "B-Positive" | Larry Teng | Jeff Eastin | June 25, 2015 | 1.01 |
Mike is revealed to have been clinically dead for 6 minutes before being revived. The current F.B.I. agent in charge, Deputy Agent Sean Logan (Lawrence Gilliard, Jr.), having recovered the Juan Badillo tape from Mike's belongings, blackmails Briggs into taking a high-risk undercover operation infiltrating an Armenian crime family. A vengeful Charlie makes preparations to go after Amber's business partner, Germaine. The Graceland team's plan to assassinate Markham is further complicated by Mike's intervention, which inadvertently provides an opening for Johnny's plans to rescue Lucia.
| 27 | 2 | "Chester Cheeto" | Larry Teng | Daniel Shattuck | July 2, 2015 | 0.99 |
Briggs attempts to find an exit from his undercover assignment in the form of killing his subject, Ari Adamian. However, Briggs finds a breakthrough in the form Adamian's romantic connections with the crime boss's daughter, Layla Sarkissian. Briggs later enlists the help of Colby, a former F.B.I. agent assigned to the Sarkissian family. Charlie struggles between keeping her duty as an agent and as a future mother. Mike struggles with his addiction to painkillers. Johnny, having been assigned by Carlito to escort Markham, convinces the latter to betray Carlito, setting into motion Lucia's rescue. However, Johnny's mission is further complicated when Lucia is captured by Carlito's guards, forcing Johnny to execute Markham.
| 28 | 3 | "Sense Memory" | Duane Clark | Derek Simon | July 9, 2015 | 0.92 |
With the aid of Colby, the Graceland team plans a sting operation that would help kill Adamian. Meanwhile, Charlie and Amber make contact with the latter's drug dealer contact during their search for Germaine; Johnny confides to Jakes about his complications with Carlito; Mike attempts to find the meaning behind his visions from his afterlife.
| 29 | 4 | "Aha" | Doug Hannah | Jason Ganzel | July 16, 2015 | 0.82 |
The Graceland team carries out their undercover operation against Ari Adamian. However, one crucial slip-up by Paige inadvertently prompts patriarch Martun Sarkissian (Peter Stormare) to interrogate and execute Colby. Adamian, having figured out the foul play, questions Briggs.
| 30 | 5 | "Piñon Tree" | Duane Clark | Chris Masi | July 23, 2015 | 0.74 |
Motivated by Colby's death, Briggs decides to continue his assignment within the Sarkissian family, attempting to cement a power struggle between Adamian and one of Martun Sarkissian's trusted lieutenants, Toros. With the aid of Briggs, Johnny extracts Lucia from Mexico and successfully arrests Carlito. After a ten-day-long research, Mike finds a potential lead from an internet conversation with the user VinXXX. With the aid of Jakes, Mike learns that VinXXX is an Indonesian civilian named Gusti, who is unwittingly delivering bomb materials for an unknown party.
| 31 | 6 | "Buto Ijo" | Scott Peters | Andy Black | July 30, 2015 | 0.76 |
Paige secures a position in one of the Sarkissian family's transportation businesses to help facilitate the power vacuum. Charlie and Jakes head to Florida to secure a deal with Amber's associates. With the aid of Johnny, Mike learns about the nature of Gusti's transportation of the bomb materials, prompting him to stay in deep cover to find Gusti's employer.
| 32 | 7 | "Bon Voyage" | Maja Vrvilo | Matt MacLeod | August 6, 2015 | 0.64 |
Charlie's attempt to conclude a drug deal with Amber's associates results in a lethal complication for her unborn baby. Mike's drug addiction turns for the worse in the form of days-long blackouts. Briggs's attempt to create a sting operation on the Sarkissians take a sour turn when the L.A.P.D. arrests the undercover operatives, with the Sarkissians taking Briggs for a drive after his release from jail.
| 33 | 8 | "Savior Complex" | Timothy Busfield | Jessica Brickman | August 13, 2015 | 0.74 |
Briggs sells a story that he is actually a criminal informant for the F.B.I., and sets a scheme in motion in order to secure the Sarkissian family's trust. Charlie, Amber, and Jakes attempt to arrest Germaine, only to later learn that Germaine is an informant for the A.T.F., leaving the case ultimately unresolved. After a deal gone wrong when carrying out his undercover work, Mike turns to Briggs for curbing his drug addiction. A recovered Mike meets with Logan and notices potential foul play, prompting him to tail Logan. Mike covertly spots Briggs driving the getaway van while masked men kidnap Logan.
| 34 | 9 | "Hand of Glory" | Stephen Surjik | AJ Marechal & Eddie Serrano | August 20, 2015 | 0.96 |
Paige is invited by Toros to attend his promotion into the Sarkissian family. However, a planned sting operation with Briggs and Logan ultimately fails, due to Mike suspecting Briggs of possibly assassinating Logan. The complication causes Paige to kill Toros in self-defense in Graceland. Meanwhile, Jakes establishes a business relationship with Germaine under the supervision of Charlie.
| 35 | 10 | "Master of Weak Ties" | Lucy Liu | Jason Ganzel & Matt MacLeod | August 27, 2015 | 0.91 |
With Toros's death falsified as a suicide, Ari Adamian is promoted within the Armenian mob, assigning Briggs to "meet and greets" with other L.A. gangs. Briggs nearly instigates a gang war by having a tryst with a gang leader's girlfriend, and assigns Johnny to go undercover as the gang leader's willing recruit. While Jakes progresses with his undercover assignment, he befriends a lawyer named Courtney. Enlisting the aid of Charlie, Mike helps Gusti get Madison into rehabilitation in order to continue his undercover work. Meanwhile, Briggs enlists Jakes' help for his eventual disappearance from Graceland.
| 36 | 11 | "The Wires" | Mary Harron | Daniel Shattuck & Samantha Rifkin | September 3, 2015 | 0.81 |
After a brutal hazing, Johnny is accepted into the Soto street gang. Meanwhile, the Sarkissian family attempts to hold a funeral for Tevan while under pressure by the Sotos. The Sotos then decide to kill the girlfriend of the gang leader, only for Ari and Briggs to intervene and kill the leader. Ari sends a message to the street gang by sending the leader's severed head to the gang matriarch, sparking a war between the Sarkissians and the Sotos. Mike and Paige conduct their investigation into Briggs's manipulations, finding a breakthrough after seeing Briggs on surveillance footage. Jakes and Charlie use a shell banking company to weaken Germaine's ties with his business partners and facilitate his actual arrest.
| 37 | 12 | "Dog Catches Car" | Larry Teng | Daniel Shattuck | September 10, 2015 | 0.82 |
The Soto Street gang instigates a gunfight with the Sarkissian family, forcing Johnny to break his cover with the aid of Mike and Paige. Briggs attempts to call Gusti, only for Johnny to give him a leg wound for his evasion. Mike learns that Briggs's machinations were a means to "make things right" for Colby's death, and he engineered the Sarin distribution to facilitate Martun Sarkissian's arrest. Martun steals the device from Gusti, only for Mike to learn that the device was a fake the entire time. Meanwhile, Jakes attempts to skim some of the seized cash evidence to facilitate Briggs's exit, only for Courtney to discover the hastily hidden cash under her bed.
| 38 | 13 | "No Old Tigers" | Larry Teng | Jeff Eastin & Daniel Shattuck | September 17, 2015 | 0.91 |
Dealing with the aftermath of Martun Sarkissian's arrest, Briggs prepares an engineered report that requires Mike's signature for approval, which Mike is personally conflicted with. After a heated argument in which only Paige is understanding of his position, Mike ultimately negotiates with Logan with arranging for Gusti's release from a prison sentence, as well as other undisclosed terms in exchange for approving the report. In order to tie loose ends with Adamian, Briggs approaches him, and the two are stranded inside an abandoned building to survive a night-long firefight with the Soto street gang. Paige and Charlie intervene in the following morning, with Briggs ultimately executing Ari in order to avoid any conflicting information with his report. Jakes, unhappy with his time in Los Angeles after being isolated from his family, moves out of Graceland to start a serious relationship with Courtney.
