= Pilot (White Collar) =

- White Collar episode
- Neal (Matt Bomer) convinces Peter (Tim DeKay) to let him out of prison in exchange for consultations on white collar crime
- Episode no.: Season 1 Episode 1
- Directed by: Bronwen Hughes
- Written by: Jeff Eastin
- Production code: 5039-08-179
- Original air date: October 23, 2009

Guest appearances
- Diahann Carroll as June; Sharif Atkins as Clinton Jones; Mark Sheppard as Curtis Hagen; Denise Vasi as Cindy; Michael Gaston as Thompson; Stephen Singer as Vincent; Alexandra Daddario as Kate Moreau

Episode chronology
← Previous —	Next → "Threads"

"Pilot" is the debut episode of the American comedy-drama television series White Collar. It was first broadcast on USA Network in the United States on October 23, 2009. The episode sets up major story arcs for the series, including Neal Caffrey's (Matt Bomer) collaboration with FBI Special Agent Peter Burke (Tim DeKay), and the significance of the disappearance of Neal's girlfriend, Kate Moreau (Alexandra Daddario).

The episode was written by Jeff Eastin and directed by Bronwen Hughes. The original broadcast ran 90 minutes. The cast includes Matt Bomer as Neal Caffrey, Tim DeKay as Peter Burke, Willie Garson as Mozzie, Marsha Thomason as Diana Lancing, and Tiffani Thiessen as Elizabeth Burke, Peter's wife. The pilot features the introduction of recurring characters Special Agent Clinton Jones (Sharif Atkins), Kate Moreau (Alexandra Daddario), and Neal's landlady June (Diahann Carroll). Guest stars include Mark Sheppard as the Dutchman, Michael Gaston and Stephen Singer. It is also the only episode in the series not to have a title sequence, with the opening credits rolling on as the episode progresses.

According to the Nielsen ratings system, an estimated 5.40 million household viewers watched the original broadcast of the pilot; this is the second-most watched episode of the series to date, behind "Free Fall". The episode received mostly positive reviews.

== Plot ==
Neal Caffrey, a successful con man, is about to finish a four-year prison sentence after being convicted of bond forgery, when he stages an elaborate prison break. FBI Special Agent Peter Burke, the man who captured Neal four years earlier, is the first to be notified with the news. He immediately abandons his current case, a forger known as "the Dutchman", to search for Neal. His intuition tells him that Neal had escaped to search for his girlfriend, Kate Moreau. Peter follows Neal to Kate's Manhattan apartment, where he confronts Neal. Neal explains that Kate has disappeared, leaving behind only an empty Bordeaux wine bottle, signifying their relationship is over. Peter takes Neal back into custody, but not before Neal gives Peter a valuable tip regarding the Dutchman: paper fiber Peter had found earlier had come from new Canadian currency. In return, Neal asks for a meeting with Peter to discuss his future.

A week passes while Peter confirms the origin of the fiber, which are found to be from Canadian currency. Peter meets with Neal in prison, and Neal offers his expertise on Peter's case in exchange for his release from prison. Peter reluctantly accepts, on the condition that Neal abandons his search for Kate and wears a tracking anklet. Peter also warns Neal that if he runs, or if the Dutchman is not found, Neal will be sent back to prison with no further possibility of release.

After his release, Neal learns the FBI will only pay for a cheap apartment. Instead of accepting this, Neal heads for a local thrift shop, where he meets June, a wealthy elderly widow. Charmed by Neal and his knowledge of her late husband Byron's Sy Devore suits, June soon offers Neal a loft in her mansion and gives him access to Byron's wardrobe.

Peter later introduces Neal to his team: Diana Lancing (later renamed Diana Berrigan), a young trainee agent who Peter trusts implicitly and Clinton Jones, a Harvard graduate and loyal junior agent. The FBI quickly seizes antique books that were intended for the Dutchman. The unlikely duo realize that the Dutchman is using the paper from the books to counterfeit 1944 Spanish Victory bonds, which could make him millions of dollars. Neal notices a nearly-microscopic signature on the fake bonds: the initials C.H.

Neal returns to June's house and finds an old friend: Mozzie (Willie Garson), who maintains deep connections in the criminal underworld. With Mozzie's help, Neal identifies the Dutchman as Curtis Hagen (guest star Mark Sheppard). Neal and Peter visit Hagen, who easily recognizes Neal. After their meeting, the FBI learns that Hagen has booked a flight out of the country, which will leave in one week. Neal and Peter know that Hagen is likely operating out of a warehouse, but fail to get a warrant or sufficient probable cause to enter it.

Neal, desperate to stay out of prison and find Kate, knows that he must find a legal way to have Hagen taken down. He takes off toward the warehouse, exiting the two-mile radius his tracking anklet allows him to stay within. Peter is alerted at the FBI headquarters that Neal has bolted. Peter believes that Neal has run off in search of Kate; however, he tracks him to Hagen's warehouse. With Neal, a convicted felon, inside the warehouse, Peter now has probable cause to enter. He does, and discovers Hagen running a massive counterfeiting operation. Hagen and his men are taken into custody, and Peter remarks to Neal that this is the third time Neal has been caught.

== Production ==
=== Conception ===
Jeff Eastin stated that he originally had the idea for White Collar while sitting in a hot tub before the WGA strike in 2008. He said that the idea was influenced by The Shield and a friend, Travis Romero (who worked on the pilot with him and would later cowrite episodes of White Collar). The idea evolved into a story focusing on a man in prison who is let out to solve crimes. However, after being told that the show sounded similar to the NBC series Life, the idea was shelved. Just before the strike, Eastin and Travis Romero decided to turn the idea into a comedy, and the idea was pitched to USA Network. While pitching the idea, Eastin described Neal Caffrey as "an evil Donald Trump."

=== Writing ===
On March 26, 2008, Jeff Wachtel, executive vice president of original programming for USA Network, ordered a pilot script for White Collar, which was then only a working title. The show was to be written and executive produced by Jeff Eastin. Eastin, who had never been to New York, wrote the 90-minute pilot script using Google Street View. A cast-contingent pilot order was announced on May 21, 2008, alongside an order for Royal Pains.

=== Casting ===
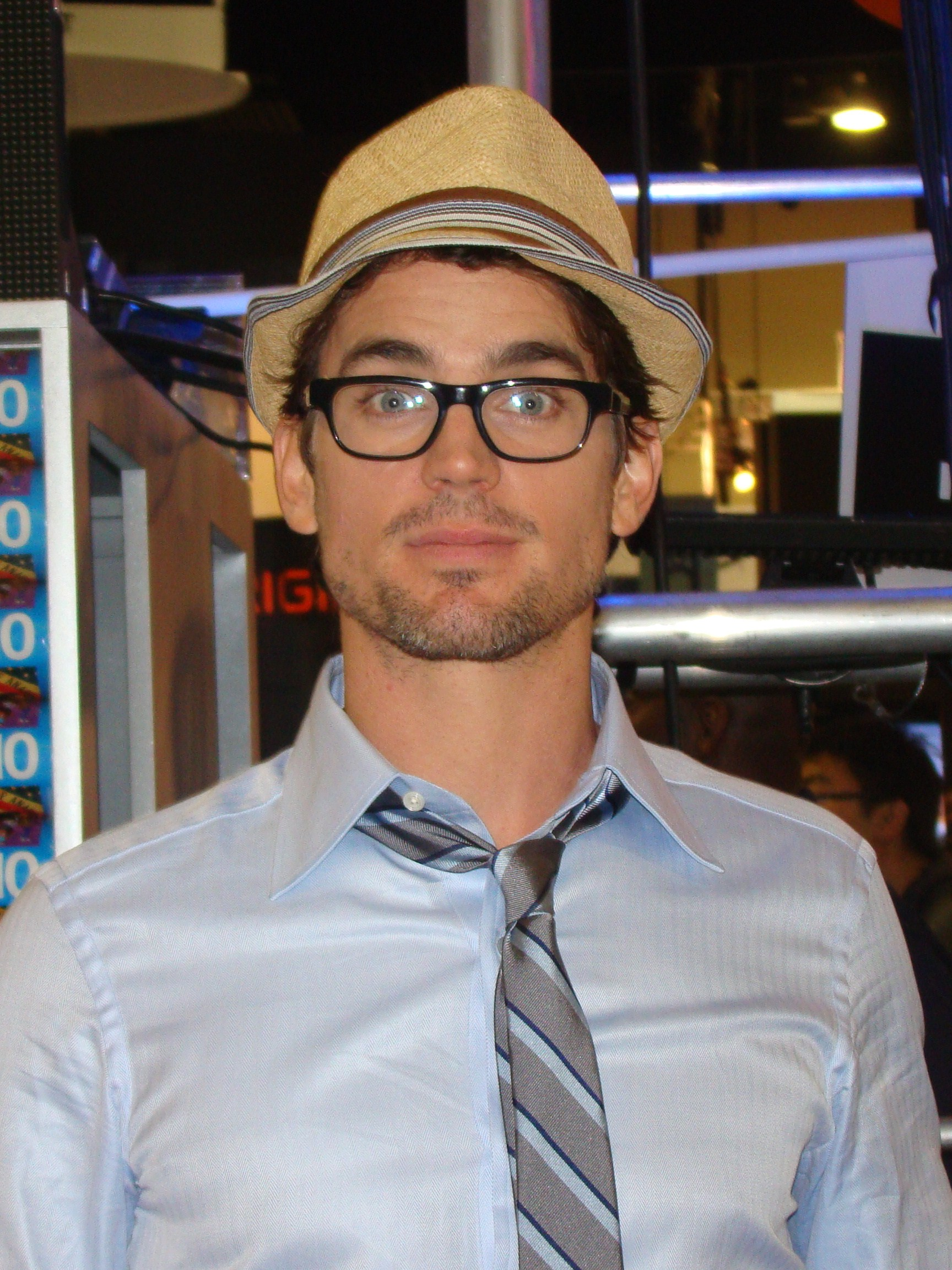
Matt Bomer was the first actor to join White Collar as Neal Caffrey on August 11, 2008.

Casting was a long process, notably with the characters of Neal Caffrey and Peter Burke. Jeff Artel had stated that what the producers wanted was a "young Warren Beatty." After seeing over 300 potential actors, and at the recommendation of casting director Gayle Pillsbury, the casting of Matt Bomer as Neal Caffrey was announced on August 11, 2008, which lifted the contingency off the pilot order. Eastin had previously seen Bomer as Bryce Larkin on NBC's Chuck, which contributed to his casting. On August 21, 2008, after a long process that included a reading with Matt Bomer, USA Network announced the casting of Tim DeKay as Peter Burke and the official greenlighting of the pilot. They also announced that the project would be directed by Bronwen Hughes. By October 31, 2008, Willie Garson had joined the cast as Mozzie. The fourth addition to the cast was Tiffani Thiessen as Elizabeth Burke (who at the time was intended to be an accountant), on November 11, 2008. Jackie de Crinis, an executive at USA Network, stated, "She brings a beauty and warmth to this role that really makes the character come alive." White Collar's final star was announced on December 8, 2008 to be Marsha Thomason. Thomason would play a junior agent named Diana Lancing; this name was later changed to Diana Berrigan.

=== Filming ===
The pilot was directed by Bronwen Hughes from a script by Jeff Eastin. Hughes had previously directed an episode of Burn Notice, and would later go on to direct the pilot of Fairly Legal, another USA Network original series. For the pilot, the cast was joined by special guest star Diahann Carroll, who portrayed June, an elderly woman who allows Neal to stay in her home. Additional guest stars included Sharif Atkins as Clinton Jones, an agent working under Peter Burke. Denise Vasi guest starred as June's granddaughter Cindy, while Alexandra Daddario made a small appearance as Neal's disappearing girlfriend, Kate Moreau. Carroll, Atkins, Vasi, and Daddario would all become recurring guests. The final additions to the cast were Mark Sheppard as Curtis Hagen, Michael Gaston as Thompson, and Stephen Singer as Vincent. The episode was filmed on location in New York City. "One of the best things about New York is [...] all we have to do is open a door or point a camera at a window, and we've got absolutely brilliant production value," Eastin stated.

=== International broadcast ===
The pilot episode that aired on USA Network following Monk had a runtime (excluding commercial advertisements) of 60 minutes. A longer version of the pilot episode has been produced that has aired in regions outside the United States, including Canada, the Czech Republic, and Poland. The extended version of the pilot is split into two 42 minute long episodes and contains additional as well as extended scenes.

== Reception ==
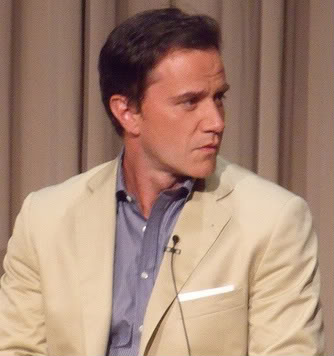
Tim DeKay's performance as Peter Burke was particularly praised in the pilot.

=== Ratings ===
Nielsen ratings were expected to be high due to the return of Bitty Schram to Monk, which premiered immediately before the pilot of White Collar. This proved to be true, and it was estimated that the premiere was seen by 5.400 million household viewers, which was the sixth-most watched program on cable television for the week; the only scripted program to surpass it was its lead-in, Monk. For its 10 PM EST time slot, White Collar was the top-rated program on cable.

=== Reviews ===
"Pilot" received mostly positive reviews, with many writers praising the performances of Matt Bomer and Tim DeKay. Jonah Krakow of IGN rated the episode an 8.5 out of 10, saying that though "there's a certain amount of suspension of disbelief required to enjoy White Collar," the "cast is pretty strong, with Bomer and DeKay doing most of the heavy lifting." He also praised the performance of Tiffani Thiessen and the premise of the show. Bob Sassone of AOL TV commended the characters and the lead actors, including Bomer, DeKay, Garson, and guest star Diahann Carroll. His only complaint was the casting of Tiffani Thiessen, claiming that Elizabeth appeared too young to be married to Tim DeKay's character. Bryan Jones heavily praised the premiere, notably the "stellar acting and strong characters." However, he felt that Elizabeth (Tiffani Thiessen) had better chemistry with Neal than with her husband. Overall, he said, "[White Collar gives] us something we can watch and enjoy week after week." One of the few moderate reviews came from Alan Sepinwall, who stated that "it's a fun show," but "it's not perfect." He went on to say that "DeKay and Bomer play well off each other," but did not appreciate the use of Tiffani Thiessen as Elizabeth or the replacement of Marsha Thomason with Natalie Morales.
