= Hawaii (TV series) =

- Also known as: Pearl City
- Genre: Police procedural; Crime drama
- Created by: Jeff Eastin
- Starring: Michael Biehn; Sharif Atkins; Ivan Sergei; Eric Balfour; Aya Sumika; Peter Navy Tuiasosopo; Cary-Hiroyuki Tagawa
- Country of origin: United States
- Original language: English
- No. of seasons: 1
- No. of episodes: 8 (1 unaired)

Production
- Executive producer: Jeff Eastin
- Producers: Jay Benson; Wendy West
- Running time: 43 minutes
- Production companies: Jeff Eastin Productions; NBC Universal Television Studio

Original release
- Network: NBC
- Release: September 1 – October 6, 2004

Hawaii is an American police procedural crime drama television series produced and distributed by NBC Universal Television for NBC. Originally titled Pearl City, this police drama was produced with the series Hawaii Five-O in mind, and debuted on September 1 and aired through October 6, 2004. Written by Executive Producer Jeff Eastin, the series revolves around a fictional elite crime unit of the Honolulu Police Department headed by veteran detective and local legend Sean Harrison (Michael Biehn) and John Declan (Sharif Atkins), a former Chicago Police Department detective transferred to Hawaii for his talents.

The series was written by Jeff Eastin, Chris Black, Reid Steiner, Wendy West, Eric Haywood, and Travis Romero.

The series was canceled in October 2004 and though eight episodes were filmed, only seven were aired.

== Cast ==
=== Main ===
- Michael Biehn as Sean Harrison
- Sharif Atkins as John Declan
- Ivan Sergei as Danny Edwards
- Eric Balfour as Christopher Gains
- Aya Sumika as Linh Tamiya
- Peter Navy Tuiasosopo as Kaleo
- Cary-Hiroyuki Tagawa as Captain Terry Harada

=== Recurring ===
- Gina Philips as Harper Woods

== Episodes ==
No.	Title	Directed by	Written by	Original release date
1	"Hawaiian Justice"	Daniel Sackheim	Jeff Eastin	September 1, 2004
2	"Underground"	Guy Ferland	Chris Black	September 6, 2004
3	"Cops 'n' Robbers"	Jeffrey Reiner	Story by : Reed Steiner & Dean Widenmann; Teleplay by : Jeff Eastin	September 8, 2004
4	"Psych Out"	Joe Ann Fogle	Reed Steiner	September 15, 2004
5	"Lost and Found"	Josh Pate	Dean Widenmann	September 22, 2004
6	"No Man Is an Island"	Gloria Muzio	Eric Haywood	September 29, 2004
7	"Out of Time"	Felix Alcala	Terri Kopp	October 6, 2004
8	"Almost Paradise"	TBD	Wendy West	UNAIRED
