= Megalodon (2002 film) =

- Directed by: Pat Corbitt
- Written by: Stanley Isaacs; Gary J. Tunnicliffe
- Produced by: Pat Corbitt; Stanley Isaacs
- Starring: Robin Sachs; Leighanne Littrell; Al Sapienza; Mark Sheppard
- Release date: October 2002
- Running time: 90 minutes
- Country: United States
- Language: English

Megalodon is a 2002 American horror film focused on a megalodon, a large extinct species of shark. It takes place out on a deep-sea oil rig. When a deep sea drilling platform penetrates the sea bed in Greenland, it unleashes a prehistoric shark of enormous power and proportions. It is known in the UK and other territories as Sharkzilla.

== Plot ==
In the North Atlantic off the coast of Greenland, a highly advanced deep sea oil rig has been recently constructed by the company Nexecon Petroleum, and named "Colossus" for its immense size. This "new" type of oil rig can dig deeper and extract more oil than any other in the world. The fact that this huge rig has been built on fault lines alarms geologists, who are concerned that the delicate ocean floor fault lines in that region might be disturbed through deep drilling, with catastrophic consequences. A reporter, Christen Giddings, has been invited by the CEO of Nexecon, Peter Brazier, to the oil rig in an attempt to address the concerns of the geologists. Christen is accompanied by a trusted cameraman Jake Thompson, who will record their findings. The oil rig's crew seem to be convinced that nothing bad will happen, and are skeptical of the geologists.

Brazier hopes that a documented report on "Colossus" will reveal that his rig has all the necessary safety arrangements and that the region is stable enough for a drilling operation. As the drilling commences, a rich oil deposit is discovered. However, further drilling is not stopped and an "ocean floor fault line" ruptures, which opens a portal to a "mirror" ocean, hidden under the normal ocean for millions of years and containing prehistoric life. An explosion occurs and the drilling system collapses. A team of engineers descend through a glass elevator to assess the situation. A giant animal is spotted approaching, which turns out to be the most powerful and fearsome oceanic predator that ever lived, Otodus megalodon, a giant, 60-foot (18 m) prehistoric shark.

A struggle for survival ensues as the crew and geologists attempt to escape from "Colossus", during which several people fall victim to the beast. In a desperate move to stop the monster shark, one of the crew members, Ross, lures it to an open space with his small submarine and overloads the fuel tanks of the machine, resulting in a gigantic explosion that kills both him and the beast. The ordeal is not over yet as another megalodon ventures into open waters, passing below a boat with Christen Giddings on board, but she is unaware of its presence.

== Cast ==
- Leighanne Littrell as Christen Giddings
- Al Sapienza as Ross Elliot
- Robin Sachs as Peter Brazier
- Jennifer Sommerfield as Amanda "Maz" Zablenko
- Fred Belford as Jack Thompson
- Evan Mirand as R.P. McGinnis
- Mark Sheppard as Mitchell Parks
- Steve Scionti as David Collen
- Brian Littrell as Rig Worker

== Releases ==
The film was released in Japan during October 2002, and in the United States during February 2004.
