= Xtinction: Predator X =

- Film poster
- Directed by: Amir Valinia
- Screenplay by: Cameron Larson; Claire Sanchez; Caleb Michaelson; George M. Kostuch
- Produced by: Inner Media; K2 Pictures; Leverage Entertainment
- Starring: Mark Sheppard; Elena Lyons; Paul Wall; Lochlyn Munro
- Music by: Kenneth Hampton
- Release date: 18 August 2010
- Running time: 90 minutes
- Country: United States
- Language: English

Xtinction: Predator X (also known as Alligator X) is an American horror/science fiction film released in 2010 and directed by Amir Valinia. The story revolves around a strange Louisiana swamp creature, which was a cloned Pliosaurus. The creature was created by zoologist (and ex-husband of the protagonist, Laura Le Crois), Dr. Charles LeBlanc. The reptile is the return to life of an extinct pliosaur, the Tyrannosaurus rex of the oceans, who was supposed to be extinct.

== Plot ==
After a 20-year hiatus, divorcee Laura Le Crois is forced to return to her home in a wetland in Louisiana after her father Pappy goes missing along with several other locals to briefly take over his wetland tour business. There, she discovers that her ex-husband, zoologist Charles LeBlanc is attempting to buy the wetland for unknown reasons, and is looking for Pappy. After Laura drives him off, she is met by a man named Matt, who will be soon drafted into the Marines. Matt asks Laura to give him, and his girlfriend Mandy a tour of the wetland so he can propose to her later that evening. Laura reluctantly agrees, and the three head off on a small motorboat.

That evening, Matt proposes to Mandy, and she accepts as the group takes a break at a dock. Laura soon witnesses her father being thrown into the water by locals Barry, and Larry Boudreaux before getting eaten by a Pliosaurus, an aquatic reptile thought to be extinct. As she runs back to warn Matt and Mandy, she finds that Barry and Larry have knocked Matt unconscious, and taken Mandy hostage before Laura herself is knocked unconscious by Larry.

The next morning, Laura, Matt, and Mandy are reported as missing. Laura's ex-boyfriend, Sheriff Tim Richards and his younger brother Deputy Henry are sent to investigate. After coming up short, Tim interrogates Charles as to why he's buying the wetland, although after getting little information, he instead decides to investigate the length of the wetlands along with local Froggy on a small motorboat in order to find Laura. Meanwhile, Laura, Matt, and Mandy are tied up in Barry and Larry's cabin, which is lined with explosives. Barry, and Larry take out Matt to be fed to the Pliosaurus while Henry encounters Charles after finding a jaw belonging to a large creature. Charles explains that the jaw belongs to the Pliosaurus, and encourages Henry to investigate the disappearances himself.

Henry calls Tim, telling him that he's going to investigate the disappearances himself, although Tim's connection on the boat prevents him from hearing Henry. Tim tries to call Henry again by climbing up a tree to get better reception, although as he does so, the Pliosaurus flips their boat, and seemingly kills Froggy, stranding Tim in the tree. Meanwhile, Henry arrives at Barry and Larry's cabin, and finds Laura, and Mandy inside, although he is also captured. Charles soon arrives as well, and explains to Laura, Mandy, and Henry that he's going to kill them which will soon lay a series of eggs. Laura realizes that he was going to buy the wetland so he could use it as a place to keep the Pliosaurus, which he has cloned, although he needs Pappy to sign the papers to give him the wetland. After Charles finds out that Barry, and Larry killed Pappy, he instead puts a sonar device in the water that attracts the Pliosaurus, and forces Laura to sign it; otherwise he'll strangle Henry Laura signs the papers, and Charles leaves, although Mandy creates a distraction by detonating the explosives, and destroying the cabin while Laura stabs Larry in the eye with a pen, allowing her, Mandy, and Henry to escape as Larry is eaten by the Pliosaurus.

Barry gives chase, and manages to shoot Henry in the leg, although they manage to reach Laura's boat nonetheless. However, the Pliosaurus destroys the boat, and the group is forced to hide as Henry bleeds out. The next morning, Henry dies from his wounds, and Laura, and Mandy run off to find help. Meanwhile, Tim jumps from the tree, and successfully swims to shore. Laura, and Mandy encounter two fishermen, and get their attention, hoping one of them has a phone, although the Pliosaurus kills both of the fishermen, forcing Laura, and Mandy to flee. Barry calls Charles, and tells him that he failed to capture the girls, although he recaptures Mandy at another nearby cabin while Laura flees.

Tim finds Henry's dead body, and radios a group of state troopers from his car while Laura encounters Froggy, who's still alive. However, Froggy is revealed to be working for Charles, and takes her hostage as well. Froggy calls Charles to tell him that both of the girls are captured, and Charles tells Froggy to kill Barry due to his incompetence. Froggy kills Barry, and begins to drive the girls to another cabin in his truck. Along the way, he reveals that his motivation for helping Charles is that Pappy had slept with his mother, and that he is actually Laura's half-brother. After being rejected by Pappy, he decided to help Charles.

Tim wanders over to the cabin that Froggy is taking Laura, and Mandy to, right before Froggy arrives with Laura, and Mandy. Tim ends up causing them to crash into the cabin, and Froggy is impaled by a wooden beam. He tells Tim, Laura, and Mandy to run as he's killed in a resulting gas explosion. The three drive back to the building where the wetland tours start, and they find the nest there, as well as the sonar device. Charles soon arrives, and takes Mandy hostage before throwing her into the water as the Pliosaurus arrives. Tim disarms Charles, and throws him into the water and the pliosaurus eats Charles as Tim, and Laura rescue Mandy. The Pliosaurus attacks them on land, although Laura's mother Lefty arrives, and throws dynamite into the Pliosaurus' mouth, killing it. Tim, Laura, and Mandy thank Lefty, whose arm was bitten off by the Pliosaurus previously, and they call the paramedics to arrive, and help them.

== Cast ==
- Lochlyn Munro as Sheriff Tim Richards
- Elena Lyons as Laura Le Crois
- Mark Sheppard as Dr. Charles LeBlanc
- Paul Wall as "Froggy"
- Caleb Michaelson as Henry Richards
- Rick Robinson Jr. as Barry Boudreaux
- Scott L. Schwartz as Larry Boudreaux
- Lacey Minchew as Mandy
- James DuMont as Tom
- Gabe Begneaud as Matt
- Phillip Beard as "Pappy"
- Debby Gaudet as "Lefty"
- Shane Partlow as Bud
- Bruce Sanders Jr. as State Trooper
- Tony Senzamici as Louisiana Trooper Ayme

== Reception ==
On the review aggregator Rotten Tomatoes, Xtinction: Predator X has a rating of 12% based on 4 reviews.
