= Graceland (TV series) =

American TV series

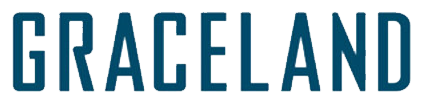
- Genre: Drama; Action
- Created by: Jeff Eastin
- Starring: Daniel Sunjata; Aaron Tveit; Brandon Jay McLaren; Vanessa Ferlito; Manny Montana; Serinda Swan
- Opening theme: "Holding On" by Ian Franzino & Dilini Ranaweera
- Country of origin: United States
- Original language: English
- No. of seasons: 3
- No. of episodes: 38 (list of episodes)

Production
- Executive producers: Jeff Eastin; Sean Daniel
- Producers: Paul Marks; Matt MacLeod; Sascha Schneider; Andrew Colville; Jason Ganzel
- Cinematography: James L. Carter; Edward J. Pei; David Moxness; Bart Tau; David Stockton; Niels Alpert
- Editors: Doug Hannah; Ivan Ladizinsky; Jon Dudkowski; Debra Beth Weinfield; Tamara Luciano; Romain Vaunois
- Running time: 42 minutes
- Production companies: Jeff Eastin & Warrior George Productions; Fox 21 Television Studios (Note: Credited as Fox Television Studios for first two seasons)

Original release
- Network: USA Network
- Release: June 6, 2013 – September 17, 2015

Graceland is an American drama television series created by Jeff Eastin that premiered on the USA Network on June 6, 2013. On October 1, 2015, USA Network cancelled Graceland after three seasons.

== Premise ==
A group of undercover agents from various United States law-enforcement agencies, including the DEA, the FBI, and ICE, live together in a confiscated Southern California beach house known as "Graceland". Rookie FBI agent Mike Warren is assigned to the house fresh out of Quantico training.

== Cast and characters ==
=== Main ===
Portrayed by	Name	Position	Assignment	Seasons		
Portrayed by	Name	Position	Assignment	1	2	3
Daniel Sunjata	Paul Briggs	Senior Agent	FBI	Main	Main	Main
Aaron Tveit	Michael "Mike" Warren	Agent	FBI	Main	Main	Main
Vanessa Ferlito	Catherine "Charlie/Chuck" DeMarco	Agent	FBI	Main	Main	Main
Manny Montana	José "Johnny" Tuturro	Agent	FBI	Main	Main	Main
Brandon Jay McLaren	Dale "Jakes" Jenkins	Agent	ICE	Main	Main	Main
Serinda Swan	Paige Arkin	Agent	DEA	Main	Main	Main

=== Recurring cast ===
- Jay Karnes as Supervising Agent Gerry Silvo (pilot) is an FBI supervisory agent responsible for overseeing all operations at Graceland. He is not seen after the pilot episode.
- Pedro Pascal as Juan Badillo (season one) is an FBI control officer who was assigned to Mike's investigation into Briggs.
- Jenn Proske as Abby (season one) is a woman from Baltimore who became Mike's girlfriend, after being introduced to him by Mike's roommate, Paige. She moved out west for the summer to take a break before beginning her career in law enforcement. One day, Mike brought Abby home and upstairs (which is against the house rules), where Abby saw Paige dressed undercover and holding a gun. Frightened, she confronted Mike and broke up with him when she felt he was lying to her.
- Scottie Thompson as Lauren Kincaid (season one) is a DEA agent who initially lived in Graceland before Mike moved in. Her partner, Donnie Banks, was shot during one of their undercover operations, where she was undercover working with the Russian Vzakonye crime family. Donnie got transferred out of Graceland and she tried everything in her power to bring him justice, even going as far as putting the rest of the agents and herself at risk. She gets kicked out of Graceland after Paige reports her to the DEA. In reality, Briggs set Lauren up to get transferred to keep her identity safe from the Russians.
- Gbenga Akinnagbe as Jeremiah Bello (season one) is a rising criminal warlord and ex-military man from Nigeria, who resides in Long Beach and was involved in smuggling both drugs and weapons. His drug supply came from the Caza cartel, and he worked with Mike, who went undercover to get close to him. He is shown to be merciless, even towards his own men. He gets arrested, convicted, and sentenced and discovers that Mike is a federal agent.
- Vincent Laresca as Rafael Cortes/Jangles (season one) is a Mexican federale who befriended Charlie and worked with her. He was revealed to be "Jangles", the mass murderer affiliated with the Caza cartel. He was named so by the FBI due to the sound of his jangling keys during his murders. He was the one responsible for torturing Briggs and getting him addicted to heroin. Charlie goes to Cortes' vacation house and they are trailed by Briggs, who confirms that he is Jangles after discovering a set of keys in his bag. Both Briggs and Charlie are captured, tied up, and tortured by him until Mike arrives and shoots him dead.
- Christopher Redman as Whistler (season one) was a heroin junkie, confidential informant for the FBI, and a friend to Charlie. Charlie had Whistler's best interests at heart, seeing his skill as a carpenter and giving him a chance to start his life over by suggesting that he put his cut of money from the FBI into buying a house to fix up. He does not go through with the buy and later on dies from a heroin overdose given to him by Quinn.
- Ciera Payton as Cassandra (seasons one-two) is Jakes' ex-wife and mother of his son Daniel. She left Jakes due to the difficulties of having a family while he works undercover. She works as a nurse in a local hospital. In season two, she files a restraining order against Jakes, preventing him from seeing their son.
- Raheem Babalola as Derek (seasons one-two) is Cassandra's boyfriend and father figure to Daniel. He met Jakes at a bar, unbeknownst to him that Jakes knew exactly who he was. After striking up a conversation, he reveals to Jakes that he is a former gang member who left that life behind after getting shot twice during a drive-by. He woke up in a hospital and fell in love with the nurse, who turned out to be Cassandra. He currently lives with Cassandra and Daniel.
- Deniz Akdeniz as Wayne "Bates"' Zelanski (season two) is a DEA agent who was assigned to work and live in Graceland, taking over Mike's room after he left for Washington, DC. He quickly formed a friendship with the other roommates, especially Johnny. He was transferred out of the house after Mike moved back in and had to decide between Jakes and him to work on the bus line case.
- Emily Rose as Jessica Foster (season two) is the assistant deputy director of the FBI, and Mike Warren's lover.
- Erik Valdez as Carlito Solano (seasons two-three)
- Jamie Gray Hyder as Lucia Solano (seasons two-three) is Carlito's sister.
- Brianna Brown as Kelly Badillo (season two) is the widow of Juan Badillo.
- Nestor Serrano as Carlos Solano (season two) is Lucia and Carlito's father, and the head of the Solano cartel.
- Carmine Giovinazzo as Sid Markham (seasons two-three) is the head of the LAPD's gang task force.
- Frank Licari as FBI director
- Lawrence Gilliard Jr. as Deputy Agent Sean Logan (season three) is the FBI agent-in-charge of the Los Angeles branch, who is aware of Paul Briggs's accidental killing of Juan Badillo and assigns Briggs to infiltrate the Sarkissian family.

== Episodes ==
Season	Episodes	Originally released	
Season	Episodes	First released	Last released
1	12	June 6, 2013	September 12, 2013
2	13	June 11, 2014	September 10, 2014
3	13	June 25, 2015	September 17, 2015

== Production ==
Although set in Southern California, Graceland was primarily filmed in Fort Lauderdale, Florida and other parts of South Florida. The producers of the show said this was because of tax incentives provided by the State of Florida.

== Reception ==
Review aggregator website Rotten Tomatoes reports a 71% approval rating for the first season, with an average rating of 6.3/10 based on 31 reviews. The website's consensus reads, "Graceland is a formulaic cop show, but its tight pacing and intriguing plot twists make for light, escapist fare." On Metacritic, the series holds a 58 score out of 100, based on 26 reviews, indicating "mixed or average" reviews.
