= Mark Sheppard =

English actor, musician (born 1964)

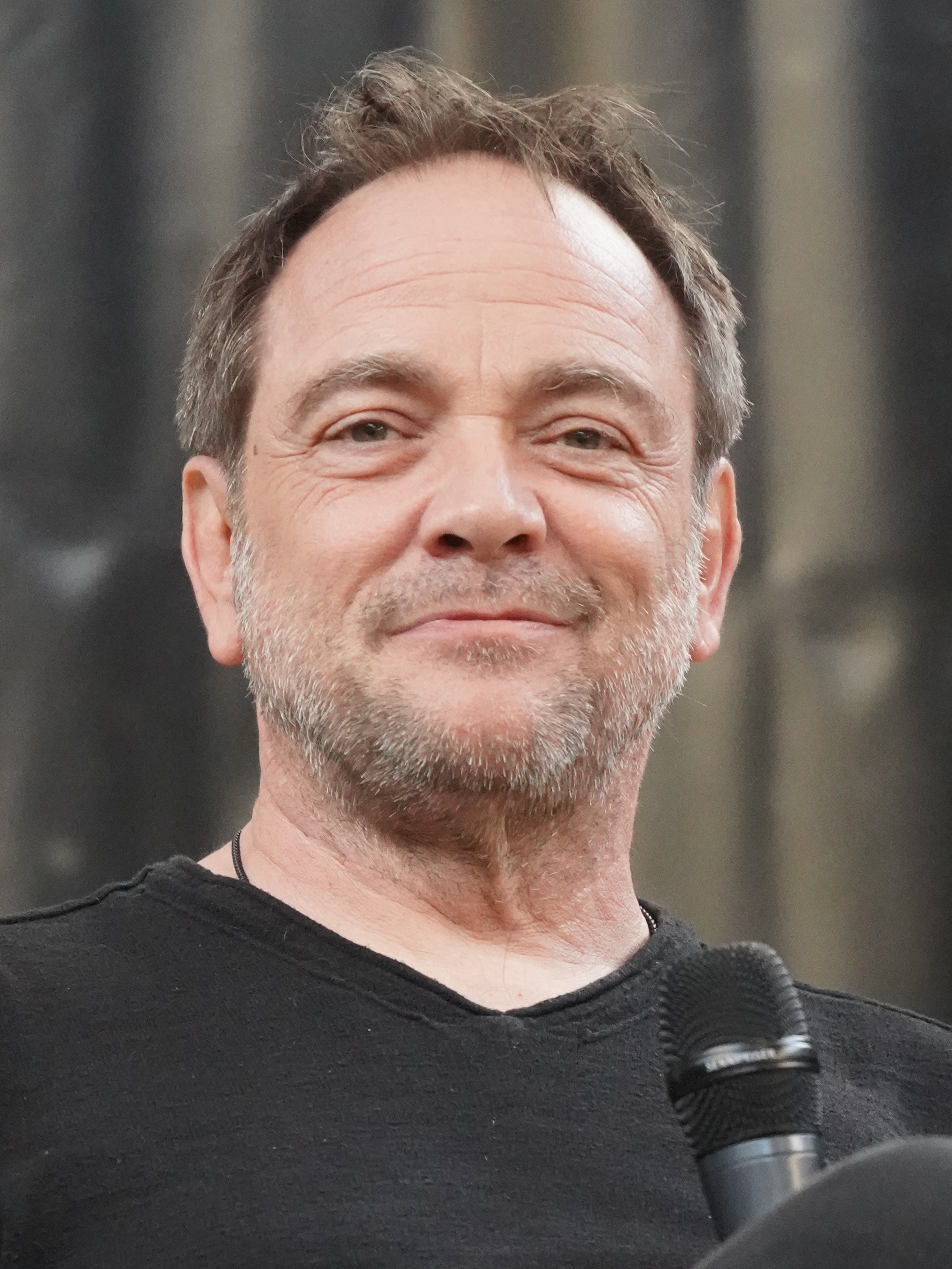
- Sheppard in 2024
- Born: Mark Andreas Sheppard; 30 May 1964 (age 62); London, England
- Other name: Mark A. Sheppard
- Occupations: Actor, musician
- Years active: 1976–present
- Spouses: Jessica Sheppard (m. 2004; div. 2014) Sarah Louise Fudge (m. 2015)
- Children: 3
- Father: W. Morgan Sheppard

Mark Andreas Sheppard (born 30 May 1964) is an English actor and musician. Sheppard is known for playing the demon/King of Hell Crowley on Supernatural and for his recurring roles as lawyer Romo Lampkin on the Battlestar Galactica reboot, Interpol investigator James Sterling on Leverage, and small-time crime lord Badger on Joss Whedon's Firefly. He also plays the character Willoughby Kipling on Doom Patrol.

== Early life ==
Mark Andreas Sheppard was born in London, England, the son of actor W. Morgan Sheppard and Regina Lisa (née Scherer) Sheppard. He is of Irish and German descent.

== Career ==
=== Music ===
Sheppard became a drummer as a teenager, buying his first drum kit in 1976, and spent many years recording and touring with artists including Robyn Hitchcock, the Television Personalities, the Finnish rock band Hanoi Rocks, and the Irish group Light a Big Fire. In 1985, Sheppard played drums on Light a Big Fire's second album, and was with them as the opening act for some stops on U2's 1987 The Joshua Tree Tour.

He had stepped away from music when his abuse of drugs and alcohol took over his life, and stayed away after he regained sobriety and his acting career began to flourish. In the 2010s, while appearing in Supernatural, he would attend fan conventions with his cast mates; co-star Rob Benedict, whose band played at the conventions, convinced Sheppard to sit in on a song in front of 3,000 attendees, and Sheppard was back. By 2017 he had rejoined Robyn Hitchcock's band on tour.

=== Television ===
Sheppard's television work includes the following: the "Fire" episode of The X-Files, a year on the Jerry Bruckheimer action series Soldier of Fortune, guest-starring and recurring roles on The Practice, The Invisible Man, Special Unit 2, JAG, Star Trek: Voyager, The Chronicle, CSI: Crime Scene Investigation, CSI: NY, Monk, and Las Vegas, among others. He played a demon named Arnon on an episode titled "Witches in Tights" on the TV series Charmed. He played Badger, a semi-comical cockney-style crime boss in the short-lived Joss Whedon show Firefly and later cast again in another Whedon show, Dollhouse as Paul Ballard's dismissive FBI superior. He appeared as a villain in season five of the Fox show 24 and as Patricia Arquette's reincarnated Jack the Ripper-style serial killer nemesis on Medium. He appeared as Romo Lampkin in seasons three and four of Battlestar Galactica, and had a recurring role as Manservant Neville in ABC Family's short-lived The Middleman. He has been seen as Anthony Anthros on Bionic Woman, as Sterling the nemesis character on Leverage, and as the King of Hell Crowley on Supernatural.

He appeared in the pilot episode of White Collar as a villainous master forger and as the Director of the Ring criminal organisation in Chuck. He appeared in the SyFy series Warehouse 13 as Regent Benedict Valda. He appears in the 2011 Doctor Who episodes "The Impossible Astronaut" and "Day of the Moon" playing the character Canton Everett Delaware III. In October 2013, Sheppard returned to White Collar, reprising his 2009 role as master forger Curtis Hagen.

=== Film ===
His film credits include the Jim Sheridan film In the Name of the Father, starring opposite Daniel Day-Lewis and Emma Thompson as Guildford Four member Patrick Armstrong; the romantic comedy Lover's Knot; the Russian historical drama Out of the Cold; the thriller Unstoppable; and with Heather Graham and Jeremy Sisto in the dark independent, Broken. He also starred in Megalodon and New Alcatraz.

Mark Sheppard directed his father, actor W. Morgan Sheppard. in the film Room 101, and co-starred with him in the psychological thriller Nether World, which the younger Sheppard also co-produced. The elder Sheppard played the older version of his son's character in the aforementioned Doctor Who and NCIS episodes.

=== Video games ===
He voiced the role of protagonist Michael Ford in The Conduit, whose mentor, John Adams, was voiced by W. Morgan Sheppard.

=== Double casting ===
Sheppard was cast with his father (who died in 2019) as the same character on three occasions, each playing the character at different ages:

- Canton Everett Delaware III in the Doctor Who episode "The Impossible Astronaut";
- War criminal Marcin Jerek a.k.a. "Mr. Pain" in the NCIS episode "Broken Bird"; and
- Captain Nemo in the 2010 film Jules Verne's Mysterious Island, which Mark also directed.

In the MacGyver reboot episode, "Cigar Cutter", which first aired 14 April 2017, he plays an assassin who assumes the identity of murder victim "Dr. Zito", a role his father played in the original series, except "Dr. Zito" was the name of the killer.

=== Voice ===
Since 2011, Mark Sheppard has been "The Voice" of BBC America promos and announcements.

== Personal life ==
Sheppard was married to actress Jessica Sheppard from 2004 to 2014. They have two sons.

On 9 November 2015, Sheppard married Australian heiress Sarah Louise Fudge. In March 2016, their daughter was born, and the couple held a wedding ceremony in November of that year in Malibu, California.

On 1 December 2023, Sheppard suffered six heart attacks at his home in Los Angeles. He needed to be resuscitated by first responders. Doctors discovered a complete blockage in his left anterior descending artery.

== Filmography ==
=== Film ===
Year	Title	Role	Notes
1993	In the Name of the Father	Paddy Armstrong	
1995	Lover's Knot	Nigel Bowles	
1997	Nether World	"California"	
1999	Out of the Cold	"Fang"	
2000	Farewell, My Love	M.J.	
2001	Lady in the Box	Doug Sweeney	
2001	New Alcatraz	Yuri Breshcov	
2002	Megalodon	Mitchell Parks	Direct-to-video film
2004	Evil Eyes	Peter	
2004	Unstoppable	Leitch	
2006	Broken	Malcolm	
2010	Xtinction: Predator X	Dr. Charles LeBlanc	
2012	Jules Verne's Mysterious Island	Young Captain Nemo	Also director
2012	War of the Worlds: Goliath	Sean O'Brien (Voice)	
2013	Sons of Liberty	Ackley	

=== Television ===
Year	Title	Role	Notes
1992–1993	Silk Stalkings	Eric / Eddie Bryce	Episodes: "In Too Deep", "Schemes Like Old Times"
1993	The X-Files	Cecil L'Ively	Episode: "Fire"
1995	M.A.N.T.I.S.	C. Flayton Ruell	Episode: "Spider in the Tower"
1997	Soldier of Fortune	Christopher "C.J." Yates	TV film
1997–1998	Soldier of Fortune, Inc.	Christopher "C.J." Yates	Main role (season 1)
1998	Sliders	Jack	Episode: "Net Worth"
1999	Martial Law	Clay Sullivan	Episode: "Thieves Among Thieves"
1999	The Practice	Eddie Wicks	Episode: Day in Court
2000	Star Trek: Voyager	Leucon	Episode: "Child's Play"
2000	JAG	Deputy Director of Air Operations / Young General Parker	Episodes: "A Separate Peace: Parts 1 & 2"
2001	The Invisible Man	Yuri Gregorov	Episode: "Diseased"
2001	The Chronicle	"Nitro"	Episode: "Bring Me the Head of Tucker Burns"
2001	Special Unit 2	"The Chameleon"	Episode: "The Skin"
2001	Lost Voyage	Ian Fields	TV film
2001–2002	V.I.P.	Nero	Episodes: "A.I. Highrise", "48½ Hours"
2002	UC: Undercover	Mitchell Reeves	Episode: "Manhunt"
2002	CSI: Crime Scene Investigation	Rod Darling	Episode: "The Hunger Artist"
2002	Charmed	Arnon	Episode: "Witches in Tights"
2002	Firefly	"Badger"	Episodes: "Serenity", "Shindig"
2003	Fastlane	Ronan Dennehy	Episode: "Simone Says"
2003	Murder, She Wrote: The Celtic Riddle	Man In Car	TV film
2003	Deep Shock	Chomsky	TV film
2003	Jake 2.0	Hartman	Episode: "Whiskey – Tango – Foxtrot"
2004	Las Vegas	George Beckwahr	Episode: "Degas Away with It"
2004	Monk	Chris Downey	Episode: "Mr. Monk vs. the Cobra"
2005	CSI: NY	Kevin Hannigan	Episode: "Hush"
2005–2006	Medium	Dr. Charles Walker	Episodes: "Penny for Your Thoughts", "Doctor's Orders", "Blood Relation"
2006	24	Ivan Erwich	Recurring role (season 5), 6 episodes
2006	Without a Trace	Ioannis "Johnny" Patani	Episode: "Requiem"
2007–2009	Battlestar Galactica	Romo Lampkin	Recurring role, 7 episodes
2007	Bionic Woman	Anthony Anthros	Episodes: Pilot, "Sisterhood"
2008	Shark	Rupert Stone	Episode: "One Hit Wonder"
2008	In Plain Sight	Russell	Episode: "To Serge with Love"
2008	The Middleman	Neville, The Manservant	Episodes: "The Clotharian Contamination Protocol", "The Palindrome Reversal Palindrome"
2008–2012	Leverage	Jim Sterling	Recurring role, 10 episodes
2009	NCIS	Young Marcin Jerek	Episode: "Broken Bird"
2009	Burn Notice	Tom Prescott	Episode: "Bad Breaks"
2009	Dollhouse	Tanaka	Episodes: "The Target", "Man on the Street", "Omega"
2009	CSI: Crime Scene Investigation	Dimitri Sadesky	Episode: "The Lost Girls"
2009–2014	White Collar	Curtis Hagen	Recurring role, 6 episodes
2009–2014	Warehouse 13	Benedict Valda	Recurring role, 6 episodes
2009–2017	Supernatural	Crowley	Recurring role (seasons 5–9); main role (seasons 10-12)
2010	Chuck	Ring Director	Episodes: "Chuck Versus the American Hero", "Chuck Versus the Other Guy"
2011	Doctor Who	Canton Everett Delaware III	Episodes: "The Impossible Astronaut", "Day of the Moon"
2011	Prime Suspect	"Blackjack" Mullins	Episode: "A Gorgeous Mosaic"
2017	MacGyver	Fake Dr. Zito / Jason Tennant	Episode: "Cigar Cutter"
2018	Mania City	Richard Johnson	Recurring role
2019–2023	Doom Patrol	Willoughby Kipling	12 episodes
2022–2023	Walker: Independence	Nathaniel Hagan	5 episodes

=== Video game roles ===
Year	Title	Role	Notes
2009	The Conduit	Michael Ford	
2021	Call of Duty: Black Ops Cold War	Roman "Knight" Grey	DLC
