= Robin Sachs =

English actor (1951–2013)

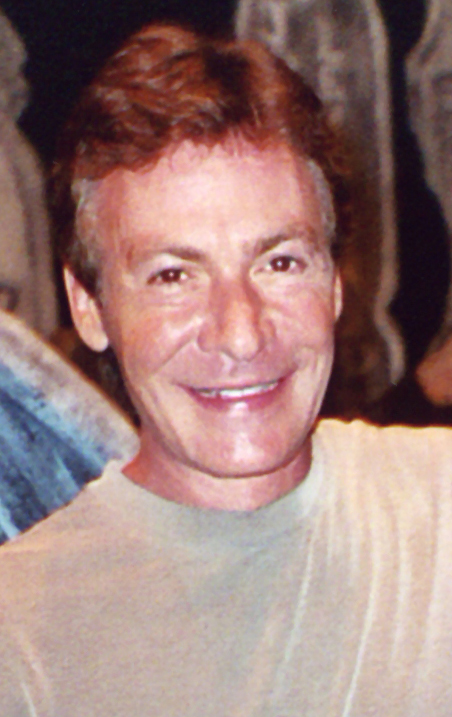
- Sachs in 2007
- Born: 5 February 1951; Hammersmith, London, England
- Died: 1 February 2013 (aged 61); Los Angeles, California, US
- Occupations: Actor, voice artist
- Years active: 1972–2013
- Spouses: Siân Phillips (m. 1979; div. 1991); Casey Defranco (m. 1995; div. 2006)
- Parents: Leonard Sachs (father); Eleanor Summerfield (mother)

Robin Sachs (5 February 1951 – 1 February 2013) was an English actor, active in the theatre, television and films. He was also known for his voice-over work in films and video games.

Born to a theatrical family, Sachs studied at the Royal Academy of Dramatic Art in London, and made a theatrical and screen career, working his way up from supporting parts in the 1970s to leading roles from the 1980s. He made his later career in the United States, and became known for his role of Ethan Rayne in the television series Buffy the Vampire Slayer.

== Early life and early career ==
Sachs was born in London, the elder of two sons of the South African-born actor Leonard Sachs and the English actress Eleanor Summerfield. His father was Jewish. After leaving school he studied at the Royal Academy of Dramatic Art, after which he followed the traditional route of provincial repertory and touring before being cast in supporting roles in West End productions during the 1970s, including Pirandello's Henry IV, with Rex Harrison; Pericles, with Derek Jacobi, and Pinero's The Gay Lord Quex, with Judi Dench, directed by John Gielgud.

== Career ==
He appeared in leading stage roles, in Leicester in 1979 in Sartre's The Assassin, Brighton in 1984 in Love Affair with Siân Phillips, and at the Ashcroft Theatre, Croydon in 1985 in On Approval with Polly James and Christopher Biggins, On British television, he was cast in Brideshead Revisited; Upstairs, Downstairs; Rumpole of the Bailey; Quiller and Gentlemen and Players. In the 1983 series Chessgame he played the secret agent Hugh Roskill.

Sachs's first film role was as Heinrich, a young vampire, in Hammer's Vampire Circus (1972). He played Thomas Culpepper, Catherine Howard's lover in Henry VIII and his Six Wives (1973), and featured in The Disappearance (1977) alongside Donald Sutherland.

In the early 1990s, Sachs moved to Los Angeles after being cast as a guest star in the television series Jake and the Fatman and played Adam Carrington in the miniseries Dynasty: The Reunion. He remained based in the US, guest starring in television shows including The Return of Ironside with Raymond Burr (1993). Among his later films were Steven Spielberg's The Lost World: Jurassic Park (1997) and Steven Soderbergh's remake of Ocean's Eleven (2001). He appeared in several science-fiction programmes on television, including Star Trek: Voyager and Torchwood, and in 1999 played General Sarris in the satirical comedy Galaxy Quest, co-starring Tim Allen and Sigourney Weaver. In 2002, he was cast as Peter Brazier, head of Nexexcon in Megalodon. In his last film appearance, Northfork (2002), he played Cup of Tea, the leader of the vestigial community of a town about to be flooded.

Sachs became known for his role as the sorcerer Ethan Rayne in the American television series Buffy the Vampire Slayer, and for voicing Zaeed Massani in the Mass Effect video game franchise, Admiral Saul Karath in Star Wars: Knights of the Old Republic, Sergeant Roderick in SpongeBob SquarePants and Xoloti in Majin and the Forsaken Kingdom. In recognition of his popularity as a voice artist, following his death, a Mass Effect 3 multiplayer challenge was enacted during the last weekend of February 2013, called "Operation Tribute".

== Personal life ==
Sachs was twice married: from 1979 to 1991 to Siân Phillips, and from 1995 to 2006 to the American actress Casey DeFranco. Both marriages were dissolved. He died after a heart attack on 1 February 2013.

== Filmography ==
=== Films ===
- Vampire Circus (1972) – Heinrich
- Henry VIII and His Six Wives (1972) – Thomas Culpeper
- East Lynne (1976, TV Movie) – Richard Hare
- The Disappearance (1977) – Young Man
- Richard II (1978, TV Movie) – Bushy
- A Flame to the Phoenix (1983) – Gavin McCrae
- Deadly Recruits (1986, TV Movie) – Hugh Roskill
- The Alamut Ambush (1986, TV Movie) – Hugh Roskill
- Cold War Killers (1986, TV Movie) – Hugh Roskill
- The Return of Ironside (1993, TV Movie) – Nicholas Metzinger
- Innocent Adultery (1994) – Himself
- The Lost World: Jurassic Park (1997) – Paul Bowman
- Ravager (1997) – Dr Shepard
- Babylon 5: In the Beginning (1998, TV Series) – Coplann
- Galaxy Quest (1999) – Sarris
- Ocean's Eleven (2001) – Seller
- Megalodon (2004) – Peter Brazier
- Northfork (2003) – Cup of Tea
- Resident Evil: Damnation (2012) – Ataman / Ivan Judanovich (voice) (final film role)

=== Television series ===
- Love and Mr Lewisham (1972) – Mr Edwin Peake Baynes
- ITV Playhouse (1972) – Hugh Randolph
- Upstairs, Downstairs (1973) – Robert
- Ten from the Twenties (1975) – Harry Lance
- Quiller (1975) – Dieter
- Centre Play (1975) – Adam
- Crown Court (1976) – Himself
- Rob Roy (1977) – Frank Osbaldistone
- Ladykillers (1981) – Gervais Rentoul
- Brideshead Revisited (1981) - Oxford student.
- Diamonds (1983) – Charles Nielsen
- Tom, Dick and Harriet (1983) – Marcel
- Chessgame (1983) – Hugh Roskill
- C.A.T.S. Eyes (1985) – James Latchmere
- Rumpole of the Bailey (1987) – Hugo Lutterworth
- A Fine Romance (1989) – Count Ivan Rakosi
- Gentlemen and Players (1989) – Journalist
- The Bill (1991) – Prosecuting Counsel
- Jake and the Fatman (1991) – Greg Hatton
- Dynasty: The Reunion (1991) – Adam Carrington
- Herman's Head (1991) – Simon
- Box Office America (1992) – Himself – Host
- Murder, She Wrote (1993) – Martin Kramer
- Diagnosis: Murder (1994) – Art Thief
- Fantastic Four (1994) – Silver Surfer / Norrin Radd / Physician / Street Fanatic
- Walker, Texas Ranger (1995) – Philippe Brouchard
- Nowhere Man (1996) – Alexander Hale / The Voice
- Pacific Blue (1996) – Wilson Dupree
- Baywatch Nights (1996) – Malcolm O'Neal
- Nash Bridges (1996) – Yuri Vashkov
- F/X: The Series (1998) – Sebastian
- Babylon 5 (1994–1998) – Na'Tok / Warleader Na'Kal / Hedronn
- Buffy the Vampire Slayer (1997–2000) – Ethan Rayne
- Star Trek: Voyager (2001) – General Valen
- Alias (2005) – Hans Dietrich
- SpongeBob SquarePants (2006) – Sergeant Sam Roderick (voice)
- Torchwood (2011) – British Professor
- Castle (2012) – Announcer
- NCIS (2012) – MI5 Inspector Andrew Challis

=== Television miniseries ===
- Number 10 (1983) – Sir Edward Hamilton

=== Shorts ===
- An Unbending People (2011) – (voice)

=== Video games ===
- Star Wars: Knights of the Old Republic (2003) – Admiral Saul Karath (voice)
- Buffy the Vampire Slayer: Chaos Bleeds (2003) – Ethan Rayne / The First (voice)
- The Bard's Tale (2004) – (voice)
- GoldenEye: Rogue Agent (2004) – (voice)
- Tom Clancy's Rainbow Six: Lockdown (2005) – (voice)
- Dragon Age: Origins (2009) – Lord Pyral Harrowmont / Murdock / Experienced Human Male / Redcliffe Messenger / Landsmeet Noble / Bandit Leader / Howe Estate Guard / Denerim Soldier / Orzammar Grey Warden / Circle Tower Templar (voice)
- Mass Effect 2 (2010) – Zaeed Massani (voice)
- Dragon Age: Origins – Awakening (2010) – Seneschal Varel / Narrator / Statue of War (voice)
- Kane & Lynch 2: Dog Days (2010) – (voice)
- Majin and the Forsaken Kingdom (2010) – Xoloti (English version, voice)
- Mass Effect 3 (2012) – Zaeed Massani (voice)

=== Audiobooks ===
Sachs narrated some 80 audiobooks, both fiction and nonfiction. These included:

- The Tiger's Wife – Narration
- A World Undone – Narration
- Our Kind of Traitor – Narration
- The Snowman – Narration
- The Redbreast – Narration
- The Devil's Star – Narration

=== Documentary shorts ===
- Greece: Secrets of the Past – Pericles
- Ubuntu – Voice Over

=== Television documentary series ===
- The World of Hammer – Heinrich (archive audio)
