= White Collar (TV series) =

American police procedural drama television series

- Genre: Police procedural; Comedy drama
- Created by: Jeff Eastin
- Starring: Matt Bomer; Tim DeKay; Willie Garson; Marsha Thomason; Tiffani Thiessen; Natalie Morales; Hilarie Burton; Sharif Atkins
- Composer: Jon Ehrlich
- Country of origin: United States
- Original language: English
- No. of seasons: 6
- No. of episodes: 81 (list of episodes)

Production
- Executive producers: Jeff Eastin; Jeff King; Mark Goffman; Nick Thiel
- Producers: Margo Myers Massey; Matt Bomer; Tim DeKay; Don Kurt (pilot)
- Production locations: New York City, New York
- Camera setup: Multi-camera
- Running time: 43–50 minutes
- Production companies: Jeff Eastin & Warrior George Productions; Fox Television Studios

Original release
- Network: USA Network
- Release: October 23, 2009 – December 18, 2014

White Collar is an American police procedural television series created by Jeff Eastin, starring Tim DeKay as FBI Special Agent Peter Burke and Matt Bomer as Neal Caffrey, a highly intelligent, charming and multi-talented con artist, forger, and thief, working as both Burke's criminal informant and an FBI consultant. Willie Garson and Tiffani Thiessen also star. The show premiered on October 23, 2009, on USA Network, and aired six complete seasons, concluding on December 18, 2014.

Show creator Eastin and the cast have been trying to revive the show in some capacity for several years. Most recently, in June 2024, it was announced that a reboot with many members of the original cast is in development. However, no broadcaster or streaming service was as yet on board, and there have been no further updates about the project's status since that 2024 announcement.

== Premise ==
Neal Caffrey, a renowned con artist, forger, and thief, is captured after a three-year game of cat and mouse with the FBI, specifically Special Agent Peter Burke, the head agent of the FBI's White Collar Crimes Unit at the FBI's New York City field office. He is convicted and sentenced to four years in prison. With only four months left, he escapes to look for his girlfriend, Kate.

Burke once again finds Caffrey and returns him to prison. This time, Caffrey proposes a deal to help Burke apprehend dangerous white collar criminals with the FBI. He will also give them full time consultation in exchange for his early release from prison as part of a work-release program. After some hesitation, Burke agrees, resulting in Neal being released early from prison and working as an FBI consultant and Burke's criminal informant. They begin an unconventional and testy relationship as they set out to capture elusive and dangerous white collar criminals in New York City.

== Cast and characters ==
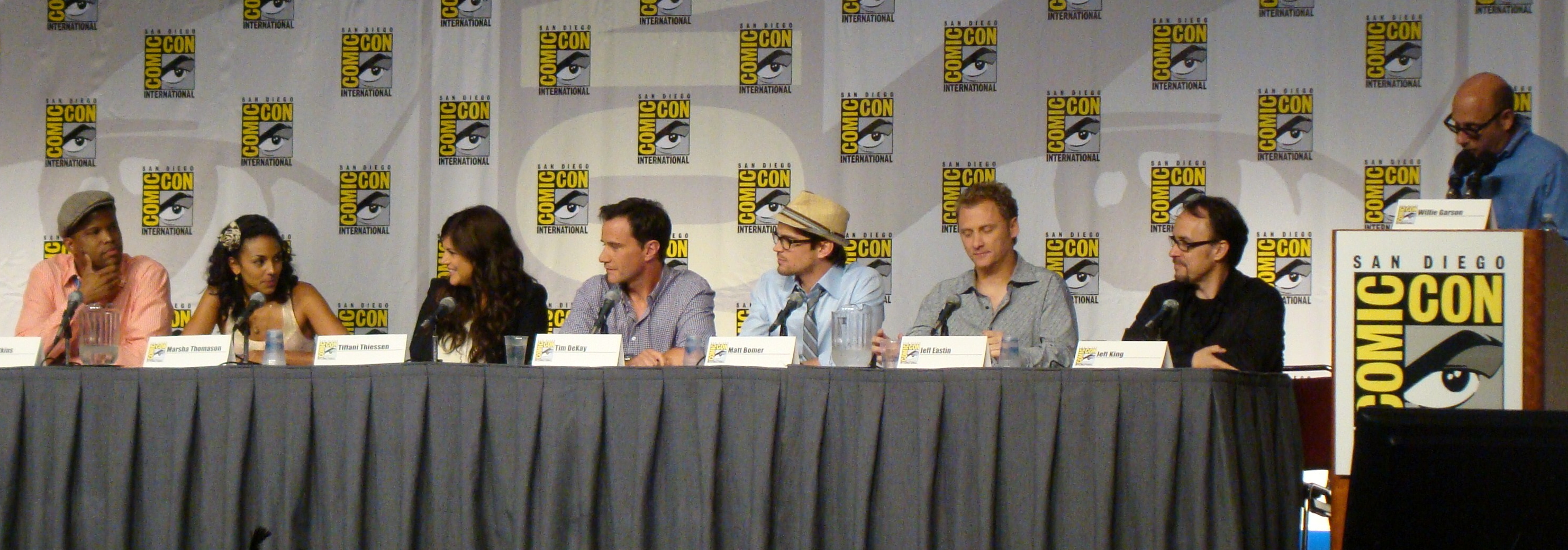
The cast of White Collar

=== Main characters ===
- Matt Bomer as Neal Caffrey, a con artist, forger, and thief who works as an FBI consultant and Burke's informant
- Tim DeKay as FBI Special Agent in Charge Peter Burke
- Willie Garson as Mozzie, a con man and Neal's best friend
- Tiffani Thiessen as Elizabeth Burke, an event planner and Peter's wife
- Marsha Thomason as FBI Special Agent Diana Berrigan (recurring, season 1; main cast, Pilot and seasons 2–6)
- Sharif Atkins as FBI Special Agent Clinton Jones (recurring, seasons 1–3; main cast, seasons 4–6)
- Hilarie Burton as Sara Ellis (recurring, seasons 2 and 4; main cast, season 3), an insurance investigator
- Natalie Morales as FBI Special Agent Lauren Cruz (season 1)

=== Recurring characters ===
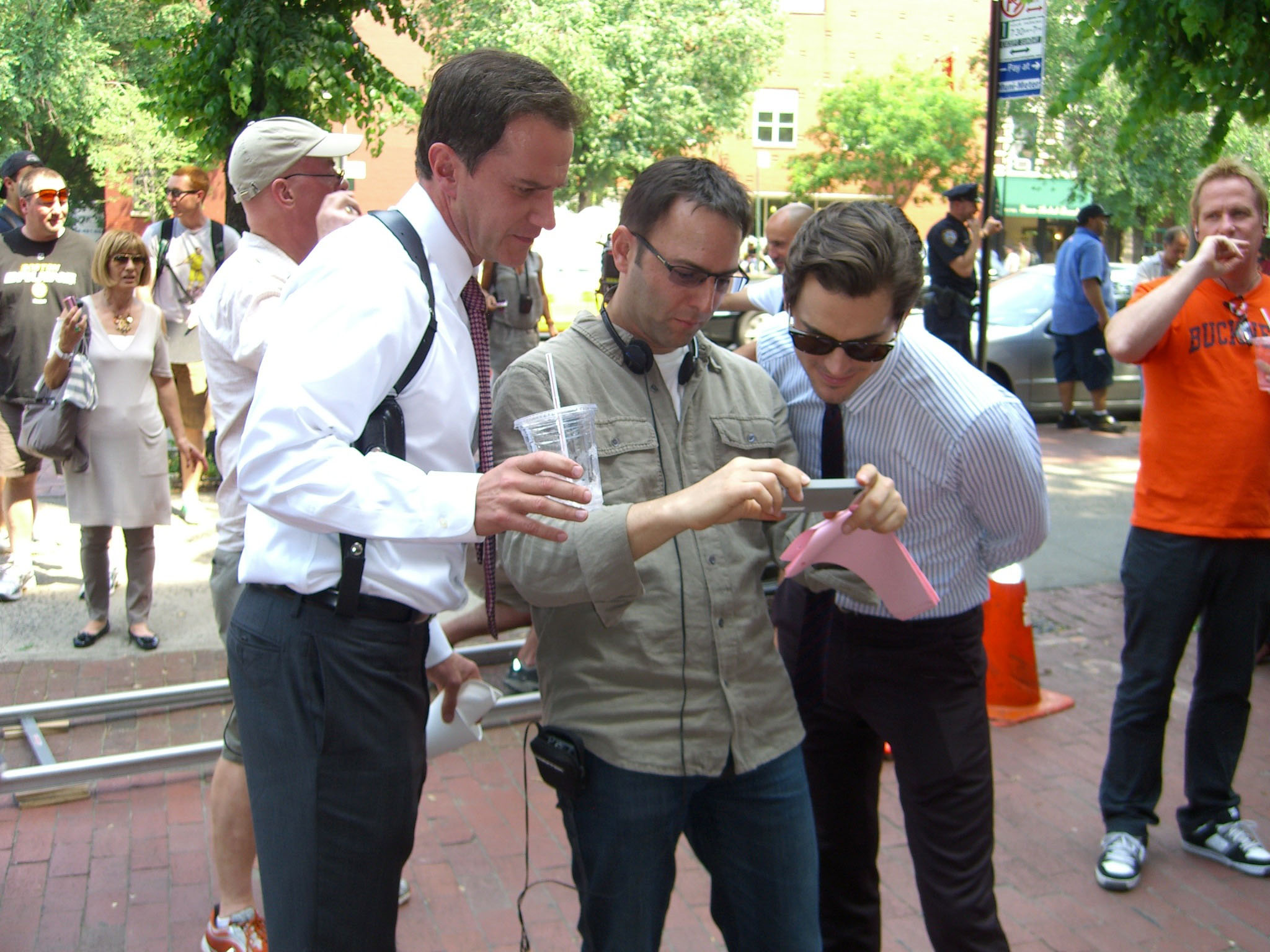
DeKay (left) and Bomer (right) during filming of the third-season episode "On the Fence", June 7, 2011

- Diahann Carroll as June Ellington, a widow who lets Neal stay with her
- James Rebhorn as FBI Special Agent in Charge Reese Hughes
- Bridget Regan as Rachel Turner/Rebecca Lowe, an expert in ancient books
- Gloria Votsis as Alexandra Hunter, a professional thief and fence
- Ross McCall as Matthew Keller, a rival thief to Neal
- Alexandra Daddario as Kate Moreau, Neal's missing girlfriend
- Treat Williams as James Bennett/Samuel "Sam" Phelps, a former cop and Neal's father
- Mark Sheppard as Curtis Hagen, a criminal
- Judith Ivey as Ellen Parker/Kathryn Hill, Neal's father's former partner
- Noah Emmerich as FBI Special Agent Garrett Fowler, an agent from the Office of Professional Responsibility
- Beau Bridges as FBI Special Agent Phillip Kramer, Peter's instructor at the FBI Academy
- Moran Atias as Christie, a doctor and Diana's girlfriend
- Andrew McCarthy as Vincent Adler, an investor and con man
- Titus Welliver as Senator Terrance Pratt, Neal's father's captain
- Denise Vasi as Cindy, June's granddaughter
- Emily Procter as Amanda Callaway

== Series overview ==
Season	Episodes	Originally released	
Season	Episodes	First released	Last released
1	14	October 23, 2009	March 9, 2010
2	16	July 13, 2010	March 8, 2011
3	16	June 7, 2011	February 28, 2012
4	16	July 10, 2012	March 5, 2013
5	13	October 17, 2013	January 30, 2014
6	6	November 6, 2014	December 18, 2014

== Ratings ==
Season	Time slot (ET)	# Ep.	Premiere		Finale	
Season	Time slot (ET)	# Ep.	Date	Premiere Viewers (in millions)	Date	Finale Viewers (in millions)
1	Friday 10 PM (October 23, 2009 – December 4, 2009); Tuesday 10 PM (January 19, 2010 – March 9, 2010)	14	October 23, 2009	5.40	March 9, 2010	4.04
2	Tuesday 9 PM (July 13, 2010 – September 7, 2010); Tuesday 10 PM (January 18, 2011 – March 8, 2011)	16	July 13, 2010	4.29	March 8, 2011	3.81
3	Tuesday 9 PM (June 7, 2011 – August 9, 2011); Tuesday 10 PM (January 17, 2012 – February 28, 2012)	16	June 7, 2011	3.90	February 28, 2012	2.55
4	Tuesday 9 PM (July 10, 2012 – September 18, 2012); Tuesday 10 PM (January 22, 2013 – March 5, 2013)	16	July 10, 2012	3.21	March 5, 2013	2.36
5	Thursday 9 PM (October 17, 2013 – January 30, 2014)	13	October 17, 2013	2.53	January 30, 2014	2.99
6	Thursday 9 PM (November 6, 2014 – December 18, 2014)	6	November 6, 2014	1.54	December 18, 2014	1.86

== Release ==
=== Syndication ===
ION Television acquired the rights for syndication of White Collar in 2013 along with Burn Notice. It is the third USA Network television series to be in syndication on ION Television, along with Monk and Psych.

=== International broadcasts ===
Country	Broadcaster(s)	Start date	Time slot
Algeria	Programme National	N/A	N/A
Australia	One	2009	7:30 PM Wednesday
Belgium	VTM	2012	11 PM Sunday
Brazil	Fox Latin America (Brazil)	August 5, 2010	10 PM Thursday
Bulgaria	bTV bTV Cinema	May 23, 2011	9 PM weekdays 8 PM (from season 2)
Canada	Bravo; Séries+ (French dubbed)	N/A	9 PM Wednesday
Croatia	Doma TV	Autumn 2019	6 PM Weekdays
Cyprus; Greece	FOX (Greece)	N/A	N/A
Denmark	TV 2 Zulu	N/A	N/A
Finland	MTV3	January 3, 2011	11:35 PM Monday
France	Série Club; M6	September 21, 2010; July 9, 2011	N/A
Germany	RTL (season 1–2); RTL Crime (season 3–4); Disney Channel (season 3.1-14, Free-to-air); NOW! (season 3.15-4, Free-to-air); Nitro (season 5–6)	September 13, 2011	11:10 PM Thursday (season 2); 8:15 PM Wednesday (season 3); 9:00 PM Friday (season 4)
Hungary	RTL II	October 1, 2012	8 PM weekdays 9 PM Sunday (from season 5)
India	STAR World Premiere; Star World	October 18, 2013	9:00 PM Friday (Season 5)
Iran	Farsi1	2013	9 PM Sunday
Israel	Yes	October 23, 2009	N/A
Italy	Fox Crime (season 1); Fox (seasons 2–6); Italia 1 (seasons 1–3, 5–6, Free-to-air); Top Crime (season 4, Free-to-air)	April 8, 2010	9 PM weekdays
Jamaica	TVJ	N/A	N/A
Japan	Mystery Channel; Dlife; TV Tokyo	January 21, 2010 (S1 - S5); May 13, 2013; October 2, 2014	N/A; 9 PM Tuesday; 12:40 AM weekdays
Latin America	Fox Latin America	N/A	S5: 13 PM Tuesdays
Lithuania	TV6	2014	4 PM Weekdays
Morocco	Medi 1 TV	N/A	10 PM Wednesday (Season 1 to 3)
Netherlands	RTL 8 RTL 7 (reruns)	December 5, 2010	N/A
New Zealand	MediaWorks New Zealand	December 17, 2012	2 PM weekdays (season 1)
Norway	TV 2 Direkte	N/A	N/A
Philippines	Fox Channel Asia (Philippines); Jack City; BEAM 31	N/A	10 PM Tuesday
Portugal	Fox and TVI	2010	9:30 PM weekdays (until season 3)
Romania	Euforia Lifestyle TV	October 9, 2013	11 PM Mon-Thu
Russia	Channel One; Fox Life; Che	2011	12:20 AM Wednesday
Slovakia	JOJ Plus	August 20, 2012	10PM Monday
Spain	Fox; Cuatro; Fox Crime; Divinity	August 24, 2011; September 2011; May 2013	N/A
Sweden	TV11	2013 (season 4)	N/A
Thailand	Fox Channel Asia (Thailand); NOW	N/A	N/A
United Kingdom; Ireland	Sky Living; Alibi	Autumn 2011 (S1); October 16, 2012 (S2 - S3)	S2: Tuesday 10:00 pm

=== Home media ===
The first season of White Collar was released in the US as White Collar: The Complete First Season as a widescreen four-disc Region 1 DVD box set on July 13, 2010. The same set was released on July 26, 2010, in Region 2, and on August 18, 2010, in Region 4. The first season of White Collar was released on Blu-ray. The season two four-disc Region 1 DVD box set was released on June 7, 2011. White Collar: The Complete Third Season four-disc Region 1 DVD box set was released on June 5, 2012. White Collar: Season 4 DVD box set was released on October 8, 2013. White Collar: Season 5 DVD box set was released on November 4, 2014. White Collar: Season 6 DVD box set was released on May 5, 2015.

DVD title	Region 4 (Australia)
The Complete First Season	August 18, 2010
The Complete Second Season	February 8, 2012
The Complete Third Season	December 11, 2013
The Complete Fourth Season	July 2, 2014
The Complete Fifth Season	December 10, 2014
The Complete Sixth Season	May 6, 2015
The Con-Plete Collection (Season 1–6)	May 6, 2015

== Reception ==
=== Critical response ===
Critical response of White Collar
Season	Rotten Tomatoes	Metacritic
1	96% (27 reviews)	79 (21 reviews)
2	100% (13 reviews)	—N/a
3	100% (10 reviews)	72 (5 reviews)
4	100% (12 reviews)	—N/a
5	83% (6 reviews)	—N/a
6	100% (5 reviews)	—N/a

For the first season, the review aggregator website Rotten Tomatoes reported a 96% approval rating with an average rating of 8/10 based on 27 reviews. The website's critical consensus reads, "Featuring clever plotting and outstanding chemistry between its leads, White Collar is a witty, briskly-paced caper series." Metacritic, which uses a weighted average, assigned a score of 79 of 100 for the season, based on reviews from 21 critics, indicating "generally favorable reviews".

For the second season, Rotten Tomatoes reported a 100% approval rating with an average score of 8/10, based on 13 reviews. The site's critical consensus reads: "White Collar's second season builds on the strengths of its first, placing greater emphasis on the charismatic cast, snappy banter, and compelling crimes."

For the third season, Rotten Tomatoes reported a 100% approval rating with an average score of 8.1/10, based on 10 reviews. The site's critical consensus reads: "White Collar boasts prestige pedigree with stripped down plotting and a laser focus on relationship stakes." Metacritic assigned a score of 72 out of 100 based on 5 critics, indicating "generally favorable reviews".

For the fourth season, Rotten Tomatoes reported a 100% approval rating with an average score of 8.7/10, based on 12 reviews. The site's critical consensus reads: "White Collar's fourth season keeps things moving with hefty amounts of action, intrigue, and handsomeness."

For the fifth season, Rotten Tomatoes reported an 83% approval rating with an average score of 8/10, based on 6 reviews.

For the sixth season, Rotten Tomatoes reported a 100% approval rating with an average score of 8.7/10, based on 5 reviews.

=== Accolades ===
At the People's Choice Awards, White Collar was nominated in the categories of Favorite TV Obsession and Favorite Dramedy in 2011 and 2015. It was nominated for Favorite TV Cable Drama between 2012 and 2014. Matt Bomer won the award for Favorite TV Cable Actor in 2015. Diahann Carroll was nominated for Outstanding Supporting Actress in a Drama series at the Image Awards in 2012 and 2014. At the TV Guide Awards, actors Tim DeKay and Matt Bomer were both nominated for Favorite Duo in 2014. At the NewNowNext Awards, Matt Bomer was nominated in the category of Cause You're Hot in 2010. Regan Mizrahi was nominated in the category of Best Performance in a TV series - Guest Starring Young Actor at the Young Artist Awards in 2012. The pilot received a nomination for Outstanding Achievement in Casting - Television Pilot - Drama at the Casting Society of America Awards in 2010.

== Reboot ==
On May 6, 2020, series creator Jeff Eastin wrote on Twitter that he "Had a great convo with Matt Bomer. We have a plan to bring #WhiteCollar back." But as of 2020, Fox 21 Television Studios, which succeeded the now-defunct Fox TV Studios, was not working on a revival. Many plans were postponed or shelved because of the disruption of the COVID-19 pandemic.

A reboot was confirmed to be in the development stages on June 6, 2024, though no network or streaming service had yet signed on as a producer or broadcaster. It was being written by Eastin, with the involvements of Bomer, DeKay, and Thiessen. It was said to be a "a fantastic script and it answers all the questions that one would have if you watch the show", and that it would honor the late cast member Willie Garson (who died in 2021 of pancreatic cancer). Eastin has said that the reboot will be titled White Collar Renaissance. No further announcements have been made about the status of the revival.
