= Jeff Eastin =

American screenwriter

- Born: Jeff Eastin; March 7, 1967 (age 58); Greeley, Colorado, United States
- Occupation(s): Producer, TV series editor, screenwriter
- Years active: 1994–present

Jeff Eastin (born March 7, 1967) is an American television producer and screenwriter. He is the co-creator of the crime series White Collar and the police drama series Graceland, both on the USA Network. Eastin also served as executive producer and showrunner for both shows.

Eastin graduated from Colorado State University with a degree in journalism. He moved to Hollywood to pursue a career in directing.

He wrote a screenplay titled Shadow Dancer, a thriller inspired by the Billy Joel song "The Stranger". The script was optioned by Zalman King. Eastin wrote a script about a small town hostage situation that was produced by Trimark Entertainment; it was released as Held Up starring Jamie Foxx. Eastin was chosen by director James Cameron to pen the True Lies sequel. In 2014, Jeff Eastin signed a deal with Fox.

For television, he created and executive-produced the series Hawaii for NBC. He also created Shasta McNasty for UPN, starring Jake Busey.
