= List of 2020 American television films and specials =

These television films and specials are scheduled to premiere in 2020.

First aired	Title	Channel	Source
January 1	Linda Ronstadt: The Sound of My Voice	CNN	
January 1	Escaping My Stalker	Lifetime	
January 2	Shattered Memories	Lifetime	
January 2	The Paley Center Salutes Law & Order: SVU	NBC	
January 3	A Deadly Price for her Pretty Face	Lifetime	
January 9	The Babysitter's Revenge	Lifetime	
January 10	Baby Monitor Murders	Lifetime	
January 12	A Beautiful Place to Die: A Martha's Vineyard Mystery	Hallmark Movies & Mysteries	
January 13	Battle of Little Big Horn	Smithsonian Channel	
January 15	The CW Dog Honors	The CW	
January 16	Gone, Daughter Gone	Lifetime	
January 17	The Daughter Stalker	Lifetime	
January 18	Robin Roberts Presents: Stolen by My Mother: The Kamiyah Mobley Story	Lifetime	
January 23	The Gayle King Grammy Special	CBS	
January 23	Death By Friendship	Lifetime	
January 24	The Wrong House Sitter	Lifetime	
January 25	Chris Watts: Confessions of a Killer	Lifetime	
January 26	Auschwitz Untold	History	
January 26	Kobe Bryant: The Death of a Legend	ABC	
January 28	Arrow: Hitting the Bullseye	The CW	
January 30	Grand Theft Auto Girls	Lifetime	
January 31	Sinister Savior	Lifetime	
February 1	A Valentine's Match	Hallmark Channel	
February 1	Poisoned Love: The Stacey Castor Story	Lifetime	
February 7	Mo'Nique & Friends: Live from Atlanta	Showtime	
February 8	The Neighbor in the Window	Lifetime	
February 8	Matching Hearts	Hallmark Channel	
February 8	Steppin' Back to Love	TV One	
February 8–9	The Witnesses	Oxygen	
February 10	Bounce Celebrates Black History	Bounce TV	
February 11	Ali & Cavett: The Tale of the Tapes	HBO	
February 14	Zombies 2	Disney Channel	
February 15	You Can't Take My Daughter	Lifetime	
February 15	The Thing About Harry	Freeform	
February 15	The Secret Ingredient	Hallmark Channel	
February 16	Picture Perfect Mysteries: Dead Over Diamonds	Hallmark Movies & Mysteries	
February 17	Hallmark Channel's Tails of Joy	Hallmark Channel	
February 18	We Are the Dream: The Kids of the Oakland MLK Oratorical Fest	HBO	
February 18	#TeamPluto	Discovery Channel	
February 19	Black Patriots	History	
February 22	Whitmer Thomas: The Golden One	HBO	
February 22	Love in Store	Hallmark Channel	
February 23	Riddled with Deceit: A Martha's Vineyard Mystery	Hallmark Movies & Mysteries	
February 24	Black in Space: Breaking the Color Barrier	Smithsonian Channel	
February 26	Shark Tank: Greatest of All Time	ABC	
February 29	Fire Fight Australia	Fox	
March 4	Volcano Live! with Nik Wallenda	ABC	
March 10	Women of Troy	HBO	
March 14	Open	BET/BET Her	
March 15	Titanic: Conspiracy of Failure	Science Channel	
March 16	Pandemic: What You Need to Know - A Special Edition of 20/20	ABC	
March 19	After Truth: Disinformation and the Cost of Fake News	HBO	
March 20	Descendants Remix Dance Party	Disney Channel	
March 21	2020 Spring Fever Preview Special	Hallmark Channel	
March 21	In the Key of Love	Hallmark Channel	
March 21	2020 Hallmark Movies & Mysteries Preview Special	Hallmark Movies & Mysteries	
March 21	CMT Remembers Kenny Rogers	CMT	
March 22	Attila's Forbidden Tomb	Science Channel	
March 25	Humboldt: Epic Explorer	Smithsonian Channel	
March 25	Pandemic: COVID-19	Discovery Channel/Science Channel	
March 26	Kill Chain: The Cyber War on America's Elections	HBO	
March 28	Just My Type	Hallmark Channel	
March 28–29	The Forgotten West Memphis Three	Oxygen	
March 29	Mystery 101: An Education in Murder	Hallmark Movies & Mysteries	
March 29	FOX Presents the iHeart Living Room Concert for America	Fox	
March 30	Homefest: James Corden's Late Late Show Special	CBS	
March 30	#KidsTogether: The Nickelodeon Town Hall	Nickelodeon	
March 30	America Rising: Fighting the Pandemic - A Special Edition of 20/20	ABC	
March 31	The Scheme	HBO	
April 1	David Blaine: The Magic Way	ABC	
April 1	Garth & Trisha Live!	CBS	
April 4	You're Bacon Me Crazy	Hallmark Channel	
April 5	Ruby Herring Mysteries: Prediction Murder	Hallmark Movies & Mysteries	
April 5	ACM Presents: Our Country	CBS	
April 6	Who Wants To Be A Millionaire? Secrets & Surprises	ABC	
April 8	A Modern Farewell	ABC	
April 8	CMT Giants Kenny Rogers: A Benefit for Musicares	CMT	
April 11	Fashionably Yours	Hallmark Channel	
April 11	The Clark Sisters: The First Ladies of Gospel	Lifetime	
April 12	Catching a Serial Killer: Sam Little	Oxygen	
April 12	Willie Nelson: American Outlaw	A&E	
April 12	This Is Stand-Up	Comedy Central	
April 12	Dead Sea Scrolls: The Doomsday Prophecy	Science Channel	
April 12	Aurora Teagarden Mysteries: Heist and Seek	Hallmark Movies & Mysteries	
April 13	TMZ Investigates: Tiger King - What Really Went Down?	Fox	
April 14	Sesame Street: Elmo's Playdate	HBO/TBS/TNT/TruTV/Cartoon Network/Boomerang/PBS Kids	
April 16	The Disney Family Singalong	ABC	
April 18	One World: Together at Home	ABC/CBS/NBC	
April 18	Nature of Love	Hallmark Channel	
April 18	Crikey! It's the Irwins: Bindi's Wedding	Animal Planet	
April 19	The Longest War	Showtime	
April 19	Hubble: Thirty Years of Discovery	Science Channel	
April 21	Let's Go Crazy: The Grammy Salute to Prince	CBS	
April 22	Born Wild: The Next Generation	National Geographic/Nat Geo Wild	
April 22	Jane Goodall: The Hope	National Geographic/Nat Geo Wild	
April 22	People Presents Harry & Meghan: A Royal Rebellion	The CW	
April 22	Saving Our Selves: A BET COVID-19 Relief Effort	BET	
April 22	The Great Global Clean Up	Discovery Channel	
April 22	Impossible Croc Rescue	Discovery Channel	
April 25	Matchmaker Mysteries: A Fatal Romance	Hallmark Movies & Mysteries	
April 25	Club MTV Presents #DanceTogether with D-Nice	MTV	
April 28	Autism: The Sequel	HBO	
April 30	Portals to Hell - Watching with the Osbournes	Travel Channel	
April 30	The Paley Center Salutes Parks and Recreation	NBC	
April 30	A Parks and Recreation Special	NBC	
May 2	Deadly Mile High Club	Lifetime	
May 3	Psycho Escort	Lifetime	
May 5	Natalie Wood: What Remains Behind	HBO	
May 8	Victory in Europe 75th Anniversary	Smithsonian Channel	
May 9	The Substitute Top 10 Wildest Pranks	Nickelodeon	
May 10	Call Your Mother	Comedy Central	
May 10	Renovate Like a Mother	HGTV	
May 10	Feeding America Comedy Festival	NBC	
May 10	The Disney Family Singalong: Volume II	ABC	
May 11	The Price Is Right at Night	CBS	
May 12	The Happy Days of Garry Marshall	ABC	
May 12	Gordon Ramsay's 24 Hours to Hell and Back: Save Our Town	Fox	
May 15	Basketball County: In the Water	Showtime	
May 15	The Greatest #StayAtHome Videos	CBS	
May 15	Bravery and Hope: 7 Days on the Front Line	CBS	
May 16	Graduate Together: America Honors the High School Class of 2020	ABC/CBS/Fox/NBC	
May 16	Killer Twin	Lifetime	
May 17	The Au Pair Nightmare	Lifetime	
May 17	AFV@Home	ABC	
May 17	Taylor Swift City of Lover Concert	ABC	
May 17	Aurora Teagarden Mysteries: Heist and Seek	Hallmark Movies & Mysteries	
May 18	Penn & Teller: Try This at Home	The CW	
May 19	The Story of Soaps	ABC	
May 19	After the Dance with Stephen A. Smith: A SportsCenter Special	ABC	
May 20	Small Town Throwdown	Discovery Channel	
May 20	Once Upon a Quarantime	Lifetime	
May 21	Celebrity Escape Room	NBC	
May 21	WWII in Europe: Voices from the Front	National Geographic	
May 22	Heroes of the Sky: The Real Mighty Eighth Air Force	National Geographic	
May 22	AKA Jane Roe	FX	
May 24	Tiger Slam	Golf Channel	
May 25	I Was Lorena Bobbitt	Lifetime	
May 25	NASA & SpaceX: Journey to the Future	Science Channel	
May 26	Our New Reality: A Diane Sawyer Special	ABC	
May 28	Questlove's Potluck	Food Network	
May 28	Untold Stories of Hip Hop: Quarantine Edition	WE tv	
May 29	Jesus Trejo: Stay at Home Son	Showtime	
May 29	Haircut Night in America	CBS	
May 30	Space Launch Live: America Returns to Space	Discovery Channel/Science Channel	
May 30	Launch America: Mission to Space Live	Discovery Channel	
May 30	The Captive Nanny	Lifetime	
May 31	My Husband's Deadly Past	Lifetime	
June 1	Iconic: TLC	The CW	
June 2	The Truth Behind Joe Exotic: The Rick Kirkham Story	Investigation Discovery	
June 2	America in Pain: What Comes Next?	ABC	
June 2	Justice Now: A BET News Special	BET	
June 3	CMT Celebrates Our Heroes: An Artists of the Year Special	CMT	
June 4	America in Crisis	NBC	
June 5	The Stars of SpongeBob Fan Favorites Special	Nickelodeon	
June 5	Race Matters: America In Crisis, A PBS NewsHour Special	PBS	
June 6	Yvonne Orji: Momma, I Made It!	HBO	
June 7	Fix My Fail	HGTV	
June 7	Justice Now: A BET Town Hall	BET	
June 8	The Time is Now: Race and Resolution	A&E/FYI/History/Lifetime/LMN/Vice	
June 9	True Life Presents: First-Time First Responders	MTV	
June 9	The Murder of George Floyd: A Nation Responds	Investigation Discovery	
June 9	Justice for All	CBS/BET	
June 9–10	OWN Spotlight: Where Do We Go From Here?	Discovery-owned networks	
June 13	Love in the Forecast	Hallmark Channel	
June 14	Timeless Love	Hallmark Movies & Mysteries	
June 15	America in Black and Blue 2020	PBS	
June 16	Greenleaf: Goin' Up Yonder	Oprah Winfrey Network	
June 18	Bully. Coward. Victim. The Story of Roy Cohn	HBO	
June 19	Sherman's Showcase: Black History Month Spectacular	AMC/IFC	
June 19	Juneteenth: A Celebration of Overcoming	ABC/National Geographic	
June 20	Love Under the Olive Tree	Hallmark Channel	
June 20	The Great American Groom-A-Long	Animal Planet	
June 21	The Beat Don't Stop	TV One	
June 21	United We Sing: A Grammy Salute to the Unsung Heroes	CBS	
June 21	Cleopatra: Sex, Lies and Secrets	Science Channel	
June 21	Why We Hate: The Reckoning	Discovery Channel	
June 21	John Legend and Family: A Bigger Love Father's Day	ABC	
June 21	ABC News Interview With John Bolton	ABC	
June 22	The Lost Boys of Bucks County	Investigation Discovery	
June 23	Dark Girls 2	Oprah Winfrey Network	
June 25	Lifetime Presents Variety's Power of Women: Frontline Heroes	Lifetime	
June 27	Global Goal: Unite for Our Future - The Concert	NBC	
June 28	Midway to Love	Hallmark Movies & Mysteries	
June 28	Lost Pyramids of the Aztecs	Science Channel	
June 29	Kids, Race and Unity: A Nick News Special	Nickelodeon	
June 30	Welcome to Chechnya	HBO	
June 30	OWN Spotlight: Oprah and 100 Black Fathers	Oprah Winfrey Network	
June 30	If Loving You Is Wrong: Oh So Right	Oprah Winfrey Network	
July 3	iHeartCountry 4th of July BBQ	The CW	
July 3	The Dick Van Dyke Show - Now in Living Color! A Special Tribute to Carl Reiner	CBS	
July 6	Celebrity Game Face	E!	
July 8	Married at First Sight: Matchmaking Special	Lifetime	
July 8	Married at First Sight: Kickoff Special	Lifetime	
July 9	World's Smallest Woman: Meet Jyoti	TLC	
July 10	Disney Channel Summer Sing-Along	Disney Channel	
July 10	Radio Disney Presents ARDYs Summer Playlist	Disney Channel	
July 10	Obsession: Stalked By My Lover	Lifetime	
July 11	Obsession: Escaping My Ex	Lifetime	
July 11	My Cat from Hell: Cat Sh#t Crazy!	Animal Planet	
July 11	Crikey! It's the Irwins: Life in Lockdown	Animal Planet	
July 12	Obsession: Her Final Vengeance	Lifetime	
July 13	CMA Best of Fest	ABC	
July 14	Showbiz Kids	HBO	
July 15	Psych 2: Lassie Come Home	Peacock	
July 15	The Baby Factory: Alabama	Lifetime	
July 16	30 Rock: A One-Time Special	NBC	
July 16	Conjoined Twins: Inseparable	TLC	
July 17	The Wrong Wedding Planner	Lifetime	
July 17	Esther Povitsky: Hot For My Name	Comedy Central	
July 19	Coins for Love	TV One	
July 19	World's Biggest Tiger Shark?	National Geographic	
July 20	Sharks vs. Dolphins: Blood Battle	National Geographic	
July 21	Sharkcano	National Geographic	
July 22	Secrets of the Bull Shark	National Geographic	
July 22	Happily Ever Altered	Lifetime	
July 22	American Injustice: The Fight for Police Reform	BET/BET Her	
July 23	My Pregnant Husband	TLC	
July 23	Most Wanted Sharks	National Geographic	
July 24	50 Shades of Sharks	National Geographic	
July 25	NBA Countdown Presented by Mountain Dew: NBA Restart	ABC	
July 25	Surviving Joe Exotic	Animal Planet	
July 25	Todd McFarlane: Like Hell I Won't	Syfy	
July 26	John Lewis: In His Own Words	BET/BET Her	
July 26	Raging Bull Shark	National Geographic	
July 27	Sharks of the Bermuda Triangle	National Geographic	
July 27	Penn & Teller: Try This At Home Too	The CW	
July 28	Stockton on My Mind	HBO	
July 28	American Catastrophe: How Did We Get Here? - A Special Edition of 20/20	ABC	
July 28	Regis Philbin: The Morning Maestro - A Special Edition of 20/20	ABC	
July 28	Shark vs. Whale	National Geographic	
July 29	What the Shark?	National Geographic	
July 29	The Weight of Gold	HBO	
July 31	Upside-Down Magic	Disney Channel	
July 31	The Go-Go's	Showtime	
July 31	The Wrong Stepfather	Lifetime	
August 1	Syfy Wire After Dark	Syfy	
August 1	Seeing America with Megan Rapinoe	HBO	
August 1	Romance in the Air	Hallmark Channel	
August 1	Ann Rule's Sleeping with Danger	Lifetime	
August 2	Ann Rule's A Murder to Remember	Lifetime	
August 2	Elizabeth Smart: Finding Justice	Lifetime	
August 2	Shark vs. Surfer	National Geographic	
August 2	Hiroshima and Nagasaki: 75 Years Later	History	
August 2	Space Launch Live: Splashdown	Discovery Channel/Science Channel	
August 4	The Swamp	HBO	
August 4	John Lewis: Celebrating A Hero	CBS	
August 4	American Chopper: The Last Ride	Discovery Channel	
August 8	Diesel Brothers: Monster Jam Breaking World Records	Discovery Channel	
August 8	Jodi Arias: Cellmate Secrets	Lifetime	
August 8	Love on Harbor Island	Hallmark Channel	
August 9	Race in America: A Movement Not a Moment	Bravo	
August 9	Air Jaws: Ultimate Breach Off	Discovery Channel	
August 9	Tyson vs. Jaws: Rumble on the Reef	Discovery Channel	
August 9	Shark Lockdown	Discovery Channel	
August 10	Great White Double Trouble	Discovery Channel	
August 10	ShaqAttack	Discovery Channel	
August 10	Jaws Awakens	Discovery Channel	
August 11	Extinct or Alive: Land of the Lost Sharks	Discovery Channel	
August 11	Will Smith: Off The Deep End	Discovery Channel	
August 11	Great White Serial Killer Extinction	Discovery Channel	
August 11	Greenleaf: The Homegoing Celebration	Oprah Winfrey Network	
August 12	Yusuf Hawkins: Storm Over Brooklyn	HBO	
August 12	Impact of Hate: Charlottesville	Investigation Discovery	
August 12	When Elevators Attack	Science Channel	
August 12	Monster Under the Bridge	Discovery Channel	
August 12	Jaws in America	Discovery Channel	
August 12	Mega Predators of Oz	Discovery Channel	
August 13	Air Jaws 2020	Discovery Channel	
August 13	Adam Devine's Secret Shark Lair	Discovery Channel	
August 13	Sharks of Neptune	Discovery Channel	
August 13	"Coronavirus and the Classroom"	NBC	
August 14	Alien Sharks: First Contact	Discovery Channel	
August 14	Lair of the Great White	Discovery Channel	
August 14	Tiger Shark King	Discovery Channel	
August 14	I Was Prey Shark Week 2	Discovery Channel	
August 15	Wedding Every Weekend	Hallmark Channel	
August 15	Sharks of Ghost Island	Discovery Channel	
August 15	Wicked Sharks	Discovery Channel	
August 15	Sharks Gone Wild 3	Discovery Channel	
August 15	I Was Prey: Terrors from the Deep	Discovery Channel	
August 16	Black America Votes: The VP Choice	BET/BET Her	
August 16	Naked & Afraid of Sharks 2	Discovery Channel	
August 18	Undercover Billionaire: Return To Erie	Discovery Channel	
August 19	Eaten by an Escalator	Science Channel	
August 22	#SayHerName, Justice for Breonna Taylor	BET Her	
August 23	Elena of Avalor: Coronation Day	Disney Junior	
August 23	The Ticket: The First Interview - A Special Edition of 20/20	ABC	
August 26	Women in Film Presents: Make It Work!	The CW	
August 28	OWN Spotlight: Culture Connection & August 28th, Ava DuVernay & Rev. Sharpton	Oprah Winfrey Network	
August 28	A March for Action	BET	
August 30	Voices Magnified: Policing in America	A&E	
August 30	Chadwick Boseman - A Tribute for a King	ABC	
August 31–September 1	The 93 Victims of Samuel Little	Investigation Discovery	
September 2	Moonies: Cult of Personality	Reelz	
September 2	The Children of God: Cult of Personality	Reelz	
September 3	The Serial Killer Among Us: Phillip Jablonski	Investigation Discovery	
September 4	BTK: Chasing s Serial Killer	Investigation Discovery	
September 6	Bernie Mac: In My Own Words	Reelz	
September 6	BET and ET Present Chadwick Boseman: Life and Legacy	BET	
September 7	Devil's Road: The True Story of Ed and Lorraine Warren	Travel Channel	
September 7	We Bare Bears: The Movie	Cartoon Network	
September 7	Jade Eyed Leopard	Nat Geo Wild	
September 7	Biography: The Nine Lives of Ozzy Osbourne	A&E	
September 8	Biography: I Want My MTV	A&E	
September 9	NFL Super Stadiums	Science Channel	
September 9	Kaplan America	Discovery Channel	
September 9	Inspire Change	NBC	
September 10	Bin Laden's Hard Drive	National Geographic	
September 10	Shark Attack: The Paige Winter Story with Robin Roberts	ABC	
September 11	9/11 Remembered: The Day We Came Together	ABC	
September 11	9/11: The Final Minutes of Flight 93	History	
September 11	9/11: The Pentagon	History	
September 12	Coastal Elites	HBO	
September 12	Wonderstruck - Animal Babies	BBC America	
September 12	Lucille Ball: We Love Lucy	Reelz	
September 14	VOMO: Vote or Miss Out	ABC	
September 15	The Presidential Town Hall: Your Voice, Your Vote, Your Questions	ABC	
September 15	The President and the People: a 20/20 Special Event	ABC	
September 15	OWN Spotlight: They Call Me Dad	Oprah Winfrey Network	
September 16	Notre-Dame: Our Lady of Paris	ABC	
September 19	Jimi Hendrix: A Perfect Murder?	Reelz	
September 19	Love at Daisy Hills	Hallmark Channel	
September 22	Time100	ABC	
September 23–24	Agents of Chaos	HBO	
September 24	OWN Your Vote: Our Lives Depend on It	Oprah Winfrey Network	
September 26	Love at Look Lodge	Hallmark Channel	
September 27	$ellebrity: The Go-To Girls - A Special Edition of 20/20	ABC	
September 27	JL Family Ranch: The Wedding Gift	Hallmark Movies & Mysteries	
September 28	Joe Exotic: Before He Was King	Investigation Discovery	
September 29	Trump vs. Biden: The Main Event - A Special Edition of 20/20	ABC	
September 30	South Park: The Pandemic Special	Comedy Central	
October 1	Let's Be Real	Fox	
October 2	Kingdom of Silence	Showtime	
October 2	Deadly Double Cross	LMN	
October 3	Country at Heart	Hallmark Channel	
October 3	Ted Bundy: The Survivors Part 1 "Eyes of Evil"	Reelz	
October 3	Green River Killer: I Met My Sister's Killer	Reelz	
October 3	Ready or Not	Fuse	
October 3	Dying to Be a Cheerleader	Lifetime	
October 4	Cheer Squad Secrets	Lifetime	
October 4	Black-ish Election Special	ABC	
October 4	The Lost Lincoln	Discovery Channel	
October 4	Follow Your Heart	Hallmark Movies & Mysteries	
October 5	O.J. & Nicole: An American Tragedy	Investigation Discovery	
October 6	Siempre, Luis	HBO	
October 7	Wild Card: The Downfall of a Radio Loudmouth	HBO	
October 8	Closer Look Thursday	NBC	
October 8	Good Eats: The House That Dripped Chocolate	Food Network	
October 9	To Live or Die on Everest	Discovery Channel	
October 9	Betrayed By My Husband	LMN	
October 10	Ben 10 vs. The Universe	Cartoon Network	
October 10	My Best Friend's Bouquet	Hallmark Channel	
October 10	Ted Bundy: The Survivors Part 2 "Ending the Evil"	Reelz	
October 10	Dating Game Killer: The Lost Victims	Reelz	
October 10	Cheer Camp Killer	Lifetime	
October 11	Cheerleader Abduction	Lifetime	
October 11	Picture Perfect Mysteries: Exit Stage Death	Hallmark Movies & Mysteries	
October 11	Everest's Greatest Mystery	Discovery Channel	
October 15	A West Wing Special to Benefit When We All Vote	HBO Max	
October 15	The Power of We: A Sesame Street Special	HBO Max/PBS Kids	
October 15	The Vice President and the People – A Special Edition of 20/20	ABC	
October 15	Decision 2020: Trump Town Hall	NBC	
October 16	Disney Channel Halloween House Party	Disney Channel	
October 16	Bad Hombres	Showtime	
October 16	Miley Cyrus Backyard Sessions	MTV	
October 16	Is There a Killer On My Street?	LMN	
October 16	The Perfect Weapon	HBO	
October 17	David Byrne's American Utopia	HBO	
October 17	Sweet Autumn	Hallmark Channel	
October 17	Photo Ark	Nat Geo Wild	
October 17	Holy Calamavote: A Special Performance by Run the Jewels	Adult Swim	
October 17	The Wrong Cheerleader Coach	Lifetime	
October 18	Who is Killing the Cheerleaders?	Lifetime	
October 18	Aurora Teagarden Mysteries: Reunited and It Feels So Deadly	Hallmark Movies & Mysteries	
October 21	537 Votes	HBO	
October 22	Alieu the Dreamer	BET	
October 22	Trump vs. Biden: The Final Presidential Debate - A Special Edition of 20/20	ABC	
October 23	American Selfie: One Nation Shoots Itself	Showtime	
October 23	Trapped By My Father's Killer	LMN	
October 23	Christmas on Ice	Lifetime	
October 24	Christmas Unwrapped	Lifetime	
October 24	The Pom Pom Murders	LMN	
October 24	Clint Eastwood: Hollywood Outlaw	Reelz	
October 24	The Battle of Alcatraz	Reelz	
October 24	Jingle Bell Bride	Hallmark Channel	
October 24	Christmas Tree Lane	Hallmark Movies & Mysteries	
October 25	Deliver by Christmas	Hallmark Movies & Mysteries	
October 25	Chateau Christmas	Hallmark Channel	
October 25	Forever Christmas	Lifetime	
October 26	Essential Heroes: A Momento Latino Event	CBS	
October 26	Amityville Horror House	Travel Channel	
October 27	The Exorcism of Roland Doe	Travel Channel	
October 27	The Campaigns that Made History	History	
October 27	Nick News: Kids Pick the President	Nickelodeon	
October 27	The Soul of America	HBO	
October 28	Burning Ojai: Our Fire Story	HBO	
October 28	This is Halloween	Travel Channel	
October 29	Ghost Adventures: Horror at Joe Exotic Zoo	Travel Channel	
October 29	Every Vote Counts: A Celebration of Democracy	CBS	
October 29	Sketchy Times with Lilly Singh	Peacock	
October 30	The Deciders	CBS	
October 30	A Crafty Christmas Romance	Lifetime	
October 30	Citizen Bio	Showtime	
October 30	Portals to Hell: Frightmare in Connecticut	Travel Channel	
October 30	The Osbournes: Night of Terror	Travel Channel	
October 31	Ghost Nation: Reunion in Hell	Travel Channel	
October 31	Croc Terror: Man Eating Monster	Reelz	
October 31	One Royal Holiday	Hallmark Channel	
October 31	Cranberry Christmas	Hallmark Movies & Mysteries	
October 31	Candy Cane Christmas	Lifetime	
November 1	The Christmas Aunt	Lifetime	
November 1	Killer Competition	LMN	
November 1	On the 12th Date of Christmas	Hallmark Channel	
November 1	Holly & Ivy	Hallmark Movies & Mysteries	
November 1	Race in America: Our Vote Counts	Bravo	
November 2	With Drawn Arms	HBO	
November 3	Stephen Colbert's Election Night 2020: Democracy's Last Stand: Building Back America Great Again Better 2020	Showtime	
November 4	CBS News: 2020 America Decides	CBS	
November 6	The Christmas Yule Blog	Lifetime	
November 7	A Welcome Home Christmas	Lifetime	
November 7	Never Kiss a Man in a Christmas Sweater	Hallmark Channel	
November 7	The Christmas Ring	Hallmark Movies & Mysteries	
November 8	The Christmas Bow	Hallmark Movies & Mysteries	
November 8	Christmas with the Darlings	Hallmark Channel	
November 8	Drew Peterson: Killer-In-Law	Reelz	
November 8	Steven Avery: Confessions of a Killer	Reelz	
November 8	A Very Charming Christmas Town	Lifetime	
November 8	Alex Trebek, Remembered: A '20/20' Special	ABC	
November 10	Country Strong 2020: Countdown to the CMA Awards	ABC	
November 11	Variety's Salute to Service	History	
November 12	The Paley Center Presents Law & Order: Before They Were Stars	NBC	
November 12	Transhood	HBO	
November 13	Christmas on the Vine	Lifetime	
November 14	Christmas on Wheels	Lifetime	
November 14	Young, Stalked, and Pregnant	LMN	
November 14	Turkey Day Sunny's Way	Food Network	
November 14	Space Launch Live: Crew-1 Lift Off	Discovery Channel/Science Channel	
November 14	Christmas in Vienna	Hallmark Channel	
November 14	Meet Me at Christmas	Hallmark Movies & Mysteries	
November 15	The Christmas Doctor	Hallmark Movies & Mysteries	
November 15	A Timeless Christmas	Hallmark Channel	
November 15	The Christmas Edition	Lifetime	
November 15	Desus & Mero: DMFM: The Home of Boom Bap - Special	Showtime	
November 16	Blood on Her Badge	TV One	
November 17	An Hour with President Obama	BET	
November 18	Smoke: Marijuana + Black America	BET	
November 18	Crazy, Not Insane	HBO	
November 18	The Fresh Prince of Bel-Air Reunion	HBO Max	
November 19	Supernatural: The Long Road Home	The CW	
November 20	Holiday Crafters Gone Wild	HGTV	
November 20	A Taste of Christmas	Lifetime	
November 21	Feliz NaviDAD	Lifetime	
November 21	Pretty Cheaters, Deadly Lies	LMN	
November 21	Between the World and Me	HBO	
November 21	A Nashville Christmas Carol	Hallmark Channel	
November 21	The Angel Tree	Hallmark Movies & Mysteries	
November 22	A Godwink Christmas: Second Chance, First Love	Hallmark Movies & Mysteries	
November 22	The Christmas House	Hallmark Channel	
November 22	Homemade Christmas	Lifetime	
November 22	Belushi	Showtime	
November 22	Untitled Barefoot Contessa Special	Food Network	
November 23	Heart of the Holidays	Hallmark Channel	
November 24	A Christmas Tree Grows in Colorado	Hallmark Channel	
November 25	Good Morning Christmas!	Hallmark Channel	
November 25	Women of Worth	NBC	
November 26	The Wonderful World of Disney: Magical Holiday Celebration	ABC	
November 26	The F-Spot with Derrick Beckles	Adult Swim	
November 26	Christmas by Starlight	Hallmark Channel	
November 27	Five Star Christmas	Hallmark Channel	
November 27	Jessica Chambers: An ID Murder Mystery	Investigation Discovery	
November 27	Jeff Dunham's Completely Unrehearsed Last-Minute Pandemic Holiday Special	Comedy Central	
November 27	Illumination Presents Minions Holiday Special	NBC	
November 27	CBS Sunday Morning: The Pet Project	CBS	
November 27	Dear Christmas	Lifetime	
November 28	Merry Liddle Christmas Wedding	Lifetime	
November 28	Finding My Daughter	LMN	
November 28	Who Killed the Lyon Sisters?	Investigation Discovery	
November 28	Elvis: Are You Lonesome Tonight?	Reelz	
November 28	The All-Star Nickmas Spectacular	Nickelodeon	
November 28	USS Christmas	Hallmark Movies & Mysteries	
November 28	Christmas Waltz	Hallmark Channel	
November 29	If I Only Had Christmas	Hallmark Channel	
November 29	My Psychedelic Love Story	Showtime	
November 29	Once Upon a Main Street	Lifetime	
November 30	The Christmas Listing	Lifetime	
November 30	The Disney Holiday Singalong	ABC	
November 30	Murder in Ypsilanti: Keith Morrison Investigates	Investigation Discovery	
December 1	The Witmans	Investigation Discovery	
December 1	Our OWN Christmas	Oprah Winfrey Network	
December 2	Baby God	HBO	
December 2	Christmas Spectacular Starring the Radio City Rockettes - At Home Holiday Special	NBC	
December 3	The Voice Holiday Celebration	NBC	
December 4	The Hollywood Christmas Parade Greatest Moments	The CW	
December 4	Macho: The Hector Camacho Story	Showtime	
December 4	Disney Holiday Magic Quest	Disney Channel	
December 4	Doc McStuffins: The Doc Is In	Disney Junior	
December 4	Kid of the Year	Nickelodeon	
December 4	Too Close for Christmas	Lifetime	
December 5	Let's Meet Again on Christmas Eve	Lifetime	
December 5	Secrets in the Snow	LMN	
December 5	Christmas in Evergreen: Bells Are Ringing	Hallmark Channel	
December 5	A Little Christmas Charm	Hallmark Movies & Mysteries	
December 6	Time for Us to Come Home for Christmas	Hallmark Movies & Mysteries	
December 6	Christmas She Wrote	Hallmark Channel	
December 6	Euphoria: Trouble Don't Last Always	HBO	
December 6	The Case Died with Her	Oxygen	
December 6	Challenge Accepted! Disney Channel's Epic Holiday Showdown	Disney Channel	
December 6	A Holly Dolly Christmas	CBS	
December 6	MTV Movie & TV Awards: Greatest of All Time	MTV	
December 6	Metallica: The Story of The Songs	Reelz	
December 6	Christmas Dilemma	TV One	
December 6	Marry Me This Christmas	Bounce TV	
December 6	Christmas Ever After	Lifetime	
December 7	The Santa Squad	Lifetime	
December 8	A Christmas For Mary	Oprah Winfrey Network	
December 8	40 Years a Prisoner	HBO	
December 9	Alabama Snake	HBO	
December 9	Dr. Seuss' The Grinch Musical Live!	NBC	
December 10	One Night Only: The Best of Broadway	NBC	
December 10	Time Person of the Year	NBC	
December 10	Silent Night - A Song For The World	The CW	
December 11	Inn Love by Christmas	Lifetime	
December 11	My Lottery Dream Home: Holiday Extravaganza	HGTV	
December 11	Disney Channel Holiday House Party	Disney Channel	
December 11	Michael Kosta: Detroit. NY. LA	Comedy Central	
December 12	Cross Country Christmas	Hallmark Channel	
December 12	A Glenbrooke Christmas	Hallmark Movies & Mysteries	
December 12	Pretty Little Dead Girl	LMN	
December 12	The Bee Gees: How Can You Mend a Broken Heart	HBO	
December 12	The Christmas Setup	Lifetime	
December 13	A Sugar & Spice Holiday	Lifetime	
December 13	Christmas Comes Twice	Hallmark Channel	
December 13	Unlocking Christmas	Hallmark Movies & Mysteries	
December 13	Couples Therapy: The COVID Special	Showtime	
December 13	Dashing in December	Paramount Network	
December 13	Tom Petty: Won't Back Down	Reelz	
December 13	Tom Petty: Life, Death & Money	Reelz	
December 13	Christmas with The Chosen	BYUtv	
December 13	White House Christmas 2020	HGTV	
December 14	Lonestar Christmas	Lifetime	
December 14	The Shot: Race for the Vaccine - A Special Edition of 20/20	ABC	
December 15	Cooking Up Christmas	Oprah Winfrey Network	
December 15	Play On: Celebrating The Power of Music to Make Change	CBS	
December 16	The Art of Political Murder	HBO	
December 18	Christmas on the Menu	Lifetime	
December 18	You'll Be Home for Christmas	HGTV	
December 19	A Christmas Carousel	Hallmark Channel	
December 19	Swept Up by Christmas	Hallmark Movies & Mysteries	
December 19	Stolen in Plain Sight	LMN	
December 19	Global Citizen Prize 2020	NBC	
December 19	A Christmas Exchange	Lifetime	
December 20	A Christmas Break	Lifetime	
December 20	Love, Lights, Hanukkah!	Hallmark Channel	
December 20	Project Christmas Wish	Hallmark Movies & Mysteries	
December 20	March of the Polar Bears	Nat Geo Wild	
December 20	Garth & Trisha Live! A Holiday Concert Event	CBS	
December 20	Whitney Houston: Story of Her Songs	Reelz	
December 20	Diana Ross: Story of Her Songs	Reelz	
December 21	Spotlight on Christmas	Lifetime	
December 22	The Christmas High Note	Lifetime	
December 22	First Christmas	Oprah Winfrey Network	
December 22	Under the Grapefruit Tree: The CC Sabathia Story	HBO	
December 23	Buddy Valastro: Road To Recovery	TLC	
December 23	Christmas at the Castle	Lifetime	
December 25	My Sweet Holiday	Lifetime	
December 25	Disney Parks Magical Christmas Day Celebration	ABC	
December 25	Surprising Santa Claus	HGTV	
December 27	Restaurant Hustle 2020: All on the Line	Food Network	
December 29	The Year: 2020	ABC	
December 29	Popstar's Best Of 2020	The CW	
December 31	Heroes On The Front Line	The CW	
December 31	Countdown to 2021	NBC	
December 31	FOX's New Year's Eve Toast & Roast 2021	Fox	
