= Reactions to the George Floyd protests =

Individuals and organizations throughout the United States and the world responded to the murder of George Floyd and the subsequent protests and riots.

== United States ==
=== Federal ===
==== Donald Trump ====
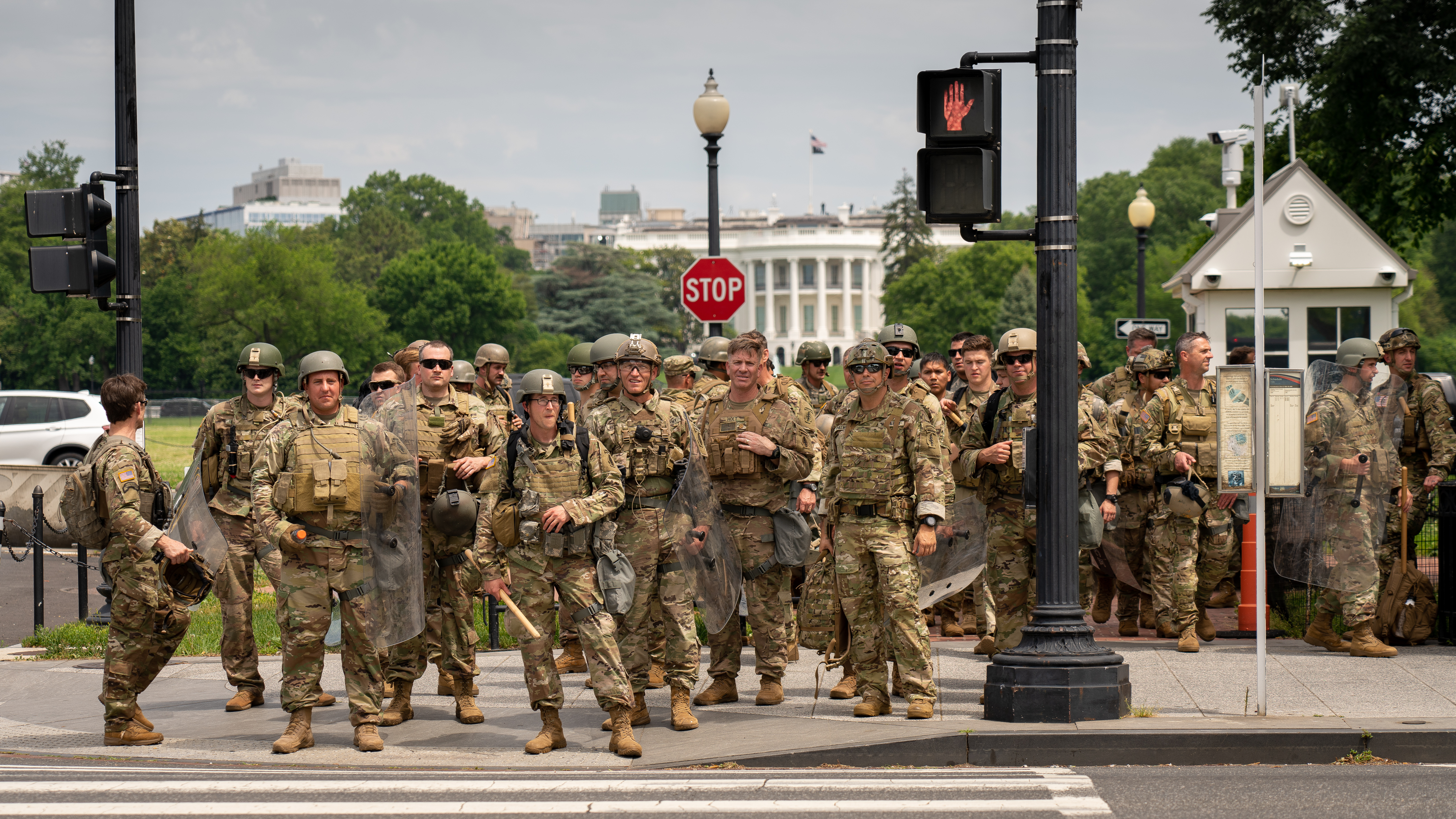
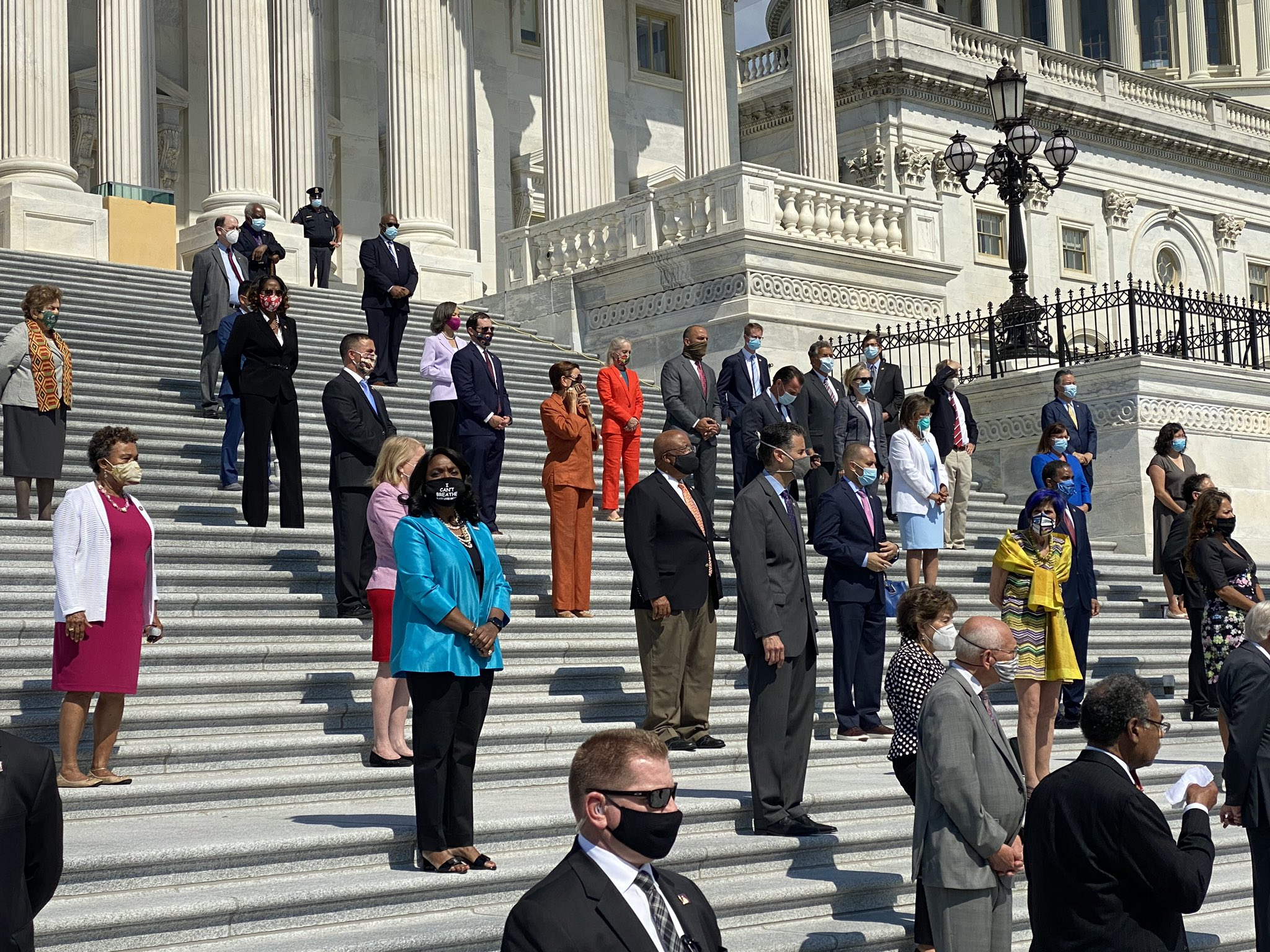
Top: Utah National Guard soldiers from the 19th Special Forces Group in front of the White House on June 3, 2020
Bottom: Congress members in Washington, D.C. after the House's passage of the George Floyd Justice in Policing Act on June 25, 2020

On May 27, 2020, U.S. president Donald Trump tweeted "At my request, the FBI and the Department of Justice are already well into an investigation as to the very sad and tragic death in Minnesota of George Floyd...."

On May 29, Trump responded to the riots by threatening to send in the National Guard, adding that "Any difficulty and we will assume control but, when the looting starts, the shooting starts." The tweet was interpreted as quoting former Miami Police Chief Walter Headley, who said "when the looting starts, the shooting starts" in December 1967, as Miami saw escalating tensions and racial protests aimed at the 1968 Republican National Convention. Trump's use of the quote was seen by Twitter as an incitement of violence; Twitter placed the tweet behind a public interest notice for breaching its terms of service in regards to incitement of violence. The next day, Trump commented on his original tweet, saying, "Looting leads to shooting, and that's why a man was shot and killed in Minneapolis on Wednesday night – or look at what just happened in Louisville with 7 people shot. I don't want this to happen, and that's what the expression put out last night means...."

In a series of tweets on May 31, Trump blamed the press for fomenting the protests and said journalists are "truly bad people with a sick agenda".

On June 1, in a teleconference with state governors, Trump said they had been "weak" in their response to the unrest and insisted that they "have to dominate ... You've got to arrest people, you have to track people, you have to put them in jail for 10 years and you'll never see this stuff again." He later proclaimed in the White House Rose Garden, "I am your president of law and order" and said he was "dispatching thousands and thousands of heavily armed soldiers, military personnel, and law enforcement officers" to deal with rioting in Washington, D.C. Trump and an entourage subsequently departed the White House and walked to St. John's Episcopal Church, whose basement had been damaged by fire, and posed for pictures in front of it holding up a Bible. Police and federal agents had used tear gas and rubber bullets to clear a crowd of nonviolent protesters from Lafayette Square to ensure an extension of area protective fencing. The forceful clearing of protesters had been originally understood to involve creating a route for Trump to walk down to the St John's Episcopal church where he then staged a photo op with the Bible, an event that initially drew widespread condemnation from military and religious leaders, as well as fellow Republicans. He was later cleared of wrongdoing by an investigative report. Four days after this event Washington D.C. renamed the street corner in front of St. John's Church "Black Lives Matter Plaza" and painted "BLACK LIVES MATTER" in large, yellow letters stretching from Lafayette Square north for two blocks.

During Trump's second presidency, in early 2025, the FBI reassigned about 20 agents who had been photographed kneeling during a protest in 2020. The agents were fired later that year.

==== U.S. Congress ====
Republican Senators Ben Sasse (NE), Susan Collins (ME), Tim Scott (SC), and Lisa Murkowski (AK), along with Congressional Democrats including Speaker of the House of Representatives Nancy Pelosi (CA) and Senate Minority Leader Chuck Schumer (NY), criticized President Trump's handling of the protests. Many other Congressional Republicans either defended the Trump administration's actions or avoided directly responding to questions about the forced clearance of Lafayette Square.

In response to the protests, Senator Marco Rubio (R-FL) argued that extremists from the far-left and the far-right wanted to use the unrest to take aim at civil society and could potentially start a Second American Civil War.

On June 7, 2020, Senator Mitt Romney (R-UT) participated alongside Black Lives Matter protesters in a march in Washington D.C. as the first Republican Senator to participate in the protests.

==== Other officials ====
Surgeon General Jerome Adams said, in relation to the protests, "I remain concerned about the public health consequences both of individual and institutional racism".

Several military officials associated with various presidential administrations—including three former Trump appointees, ex-Secretary of Defense and retired Marine Corps general Jim Mattis, former White House Chief of Staff and Secretary of Homeland Security John F. Kelly, and former Assistant Secretary of Defense Mick Mulroy—criticized Trump's response to the unrest.

Democratic presumptive and eventual president Joe Biden compared the murder of George Floyd to the assassination of Martin Luther King Jr. in 1968, saying that even "Dr. King's assassination did not have the worldwide impact that George Floyd's death did."

=== States ===
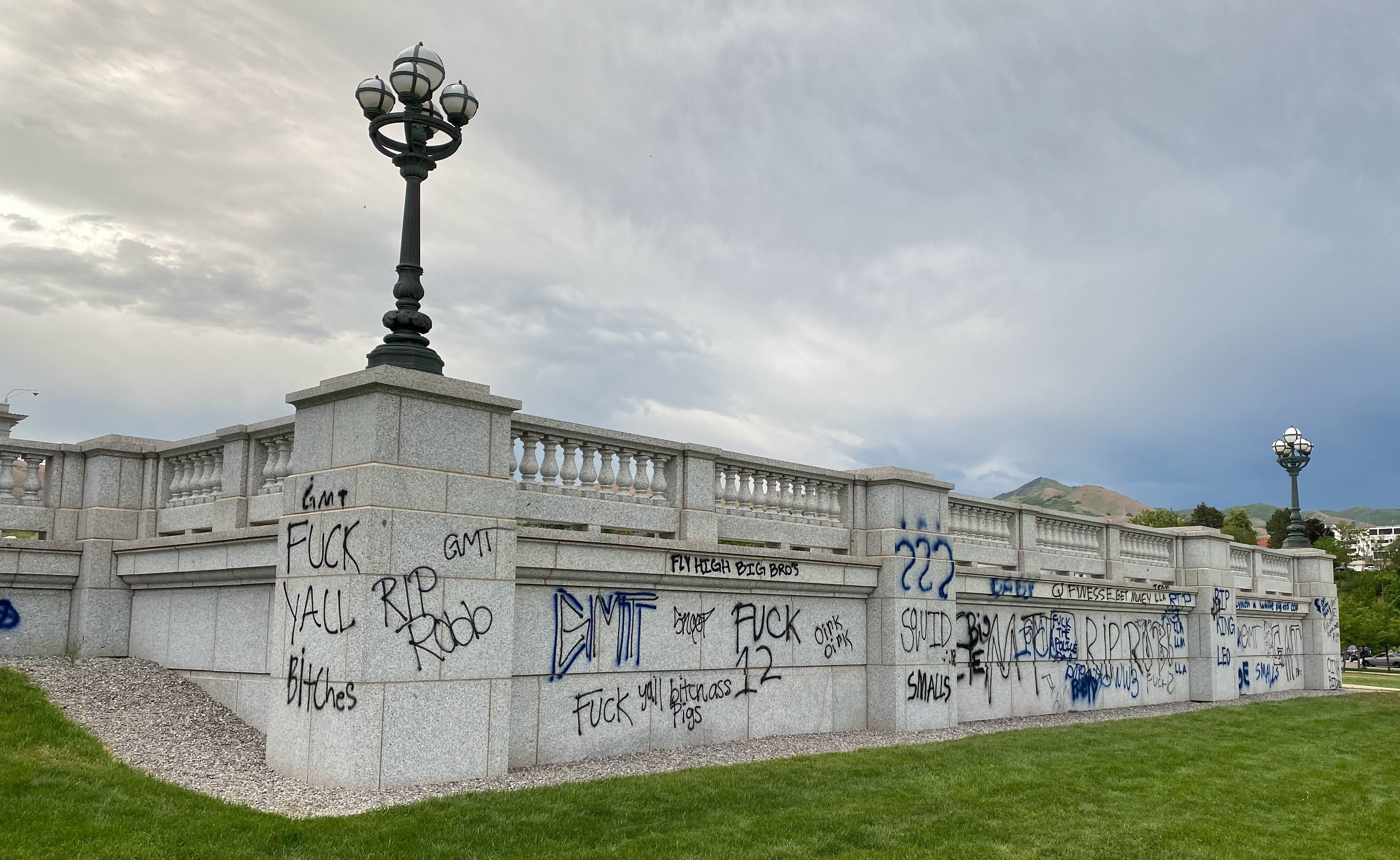
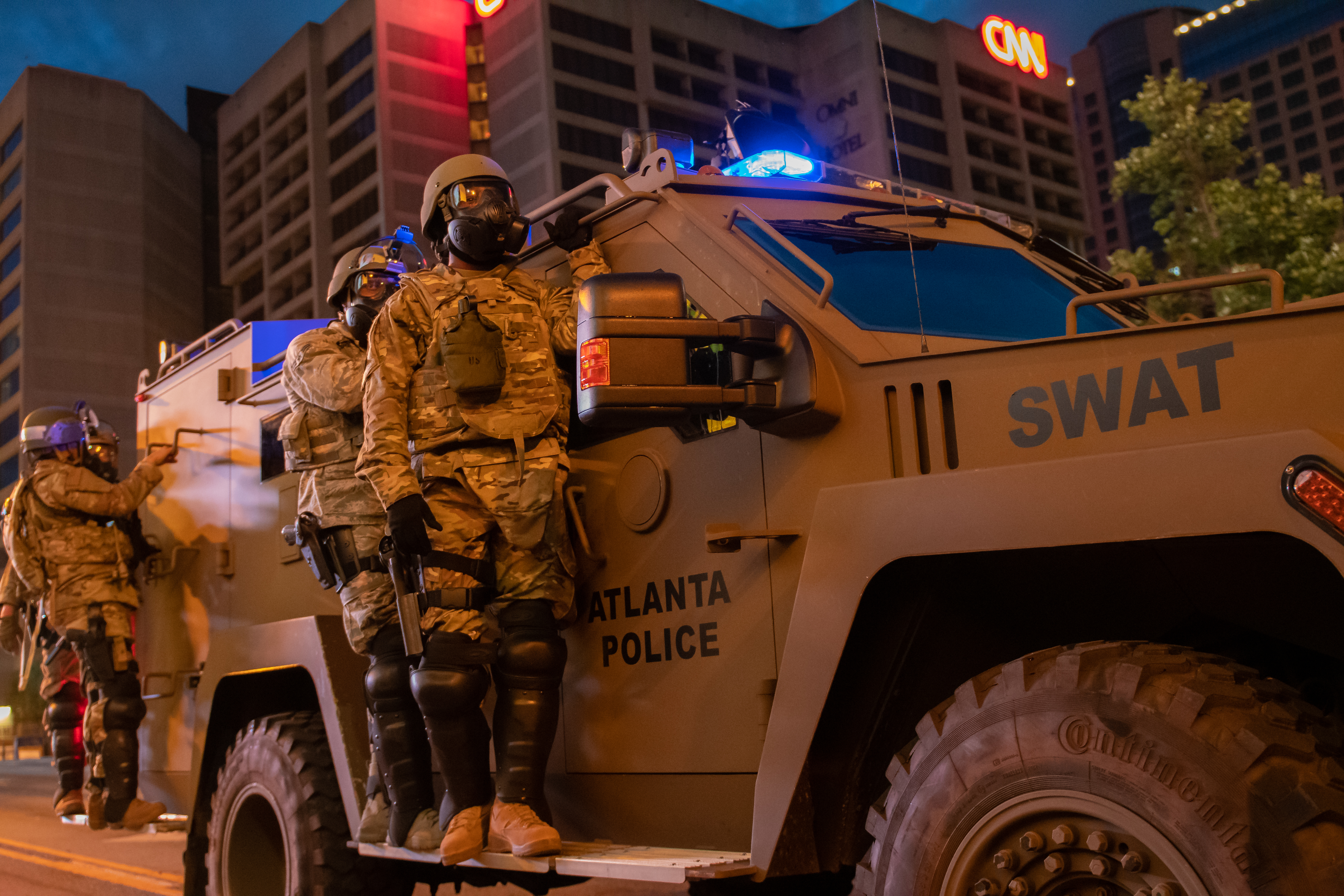
Top: Anti-police graffiti at the Utah State Capitol on May 30.
Bottom: Georgia National Guard enforce a curfew during protests in Atlanta on June 4.

On May 30, New York Governor Andrew Cuomo stated that the riots have exposed the "inequality and discrimination in the criminal justice system" and that "When you have one episode, two episodes maybe you can look at them as individual episodes. But when you have 10 episodes, 15 episodes, you are blind or in denial if you are still treating each one like a unique situation".

Atlanta Mayor Keisha Lance Bottoms called for protesters to express their anger through "non-violent" means. She decried the riots as illegitimate and accused them of harming Atlanta rather than helping.

Iowa Governor Kim Reynolds and Des Moines Mayor Frank Cownie, while sympathizing with the anger of protesters, asked for citizens to stop the violence and have a "Respectful, peaceful dialogue".

After two people were charged with a hate crime for vandalizing a Black Lives Matter mural in Martinez, California, Contra Costa County District Attorney Diana Becton said the BLM movement "is an important civil rights cause that deserves all of our attention."

=== General public ===
An early June 2020 Reuters/Ipsos opinion poll indicated the majority (64%) of American adults are "sympathetic to people who are out protesting right now" and a slight majority (55%) disapprove of Trump's handling of the protests. An Emerson poll of registered voters conducted between June 2–3 indicated that among American voters, 46% approve of the protests, 38% disapprove and 16% were neutral; 76% of voters disapprove of looting and property destruction during the protests, while 17% approve.

=== Industry ===
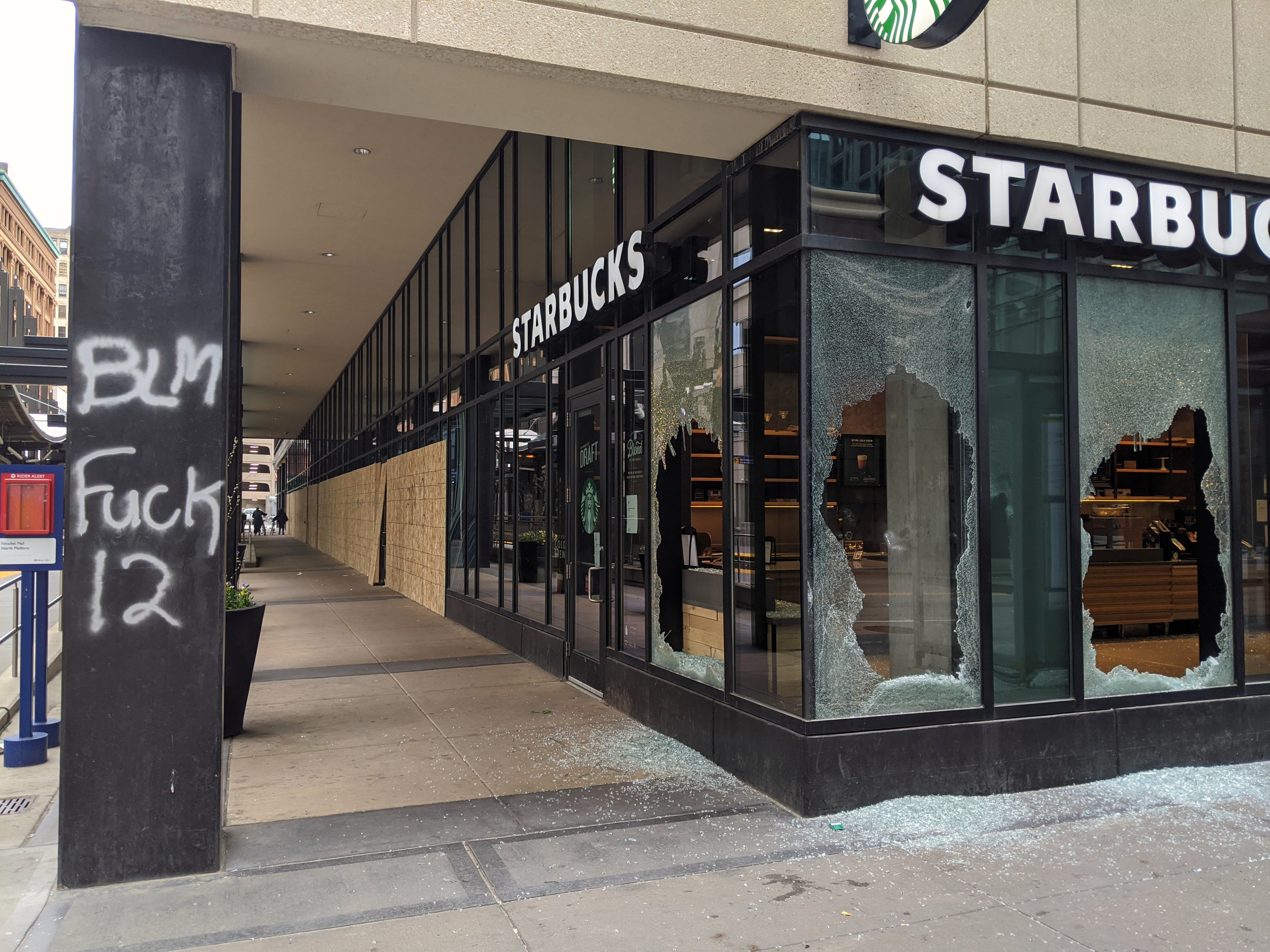
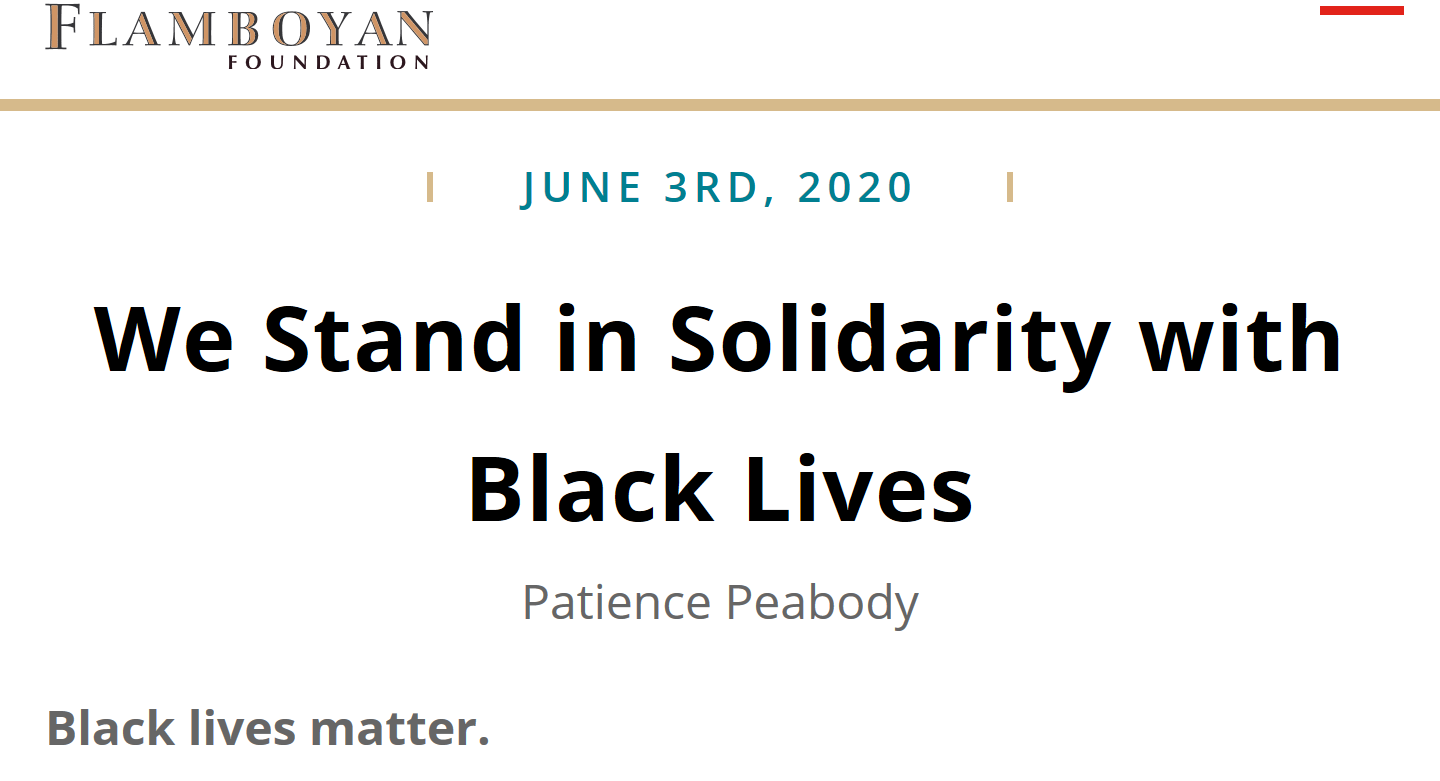
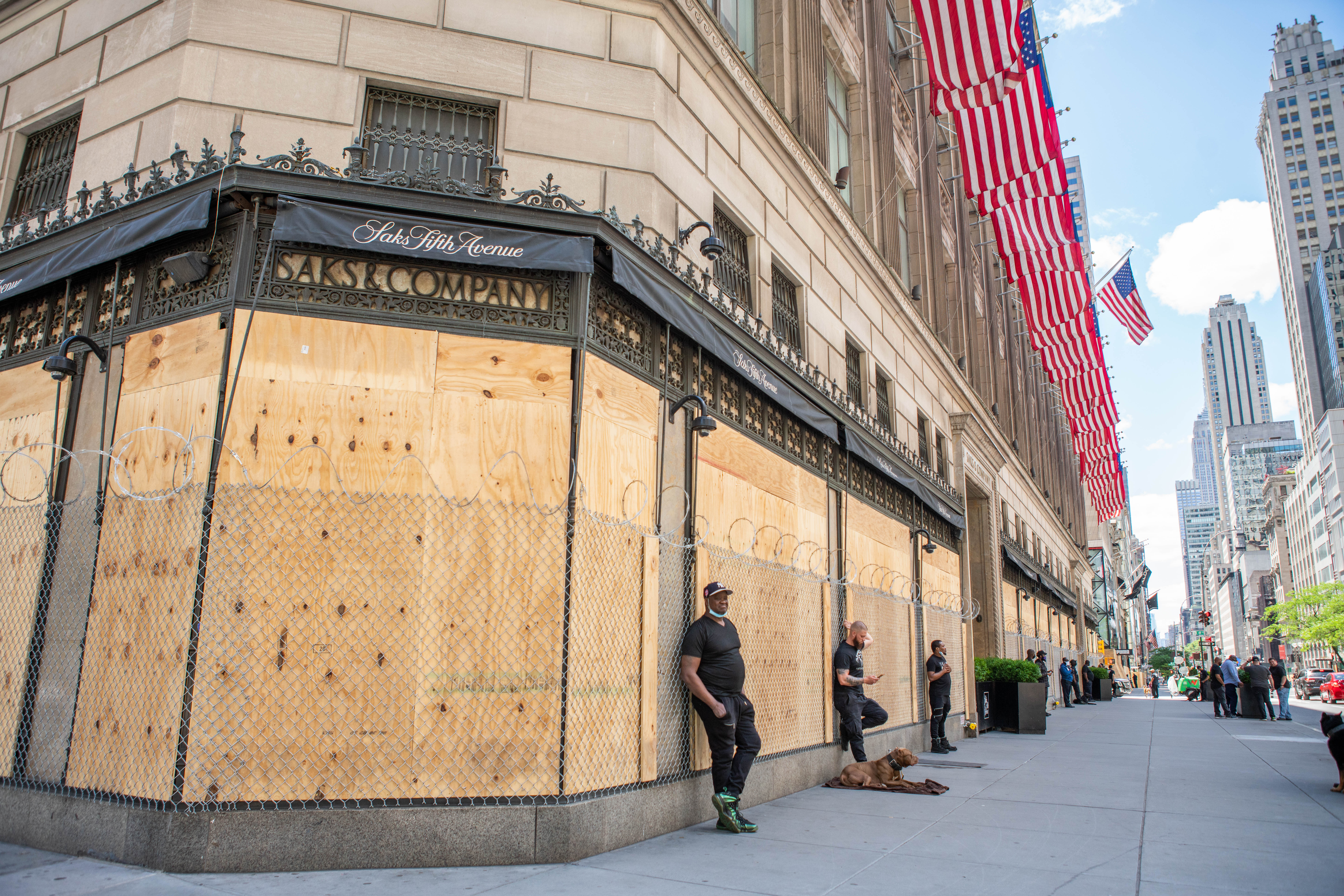
Top: A damaged Starbucks coffee shop in Minneapolis on May 29
Middle: A website for a children's organization expresses support for Black Lives Matter on June 3
Bottom: Private security and boarded up storefronts at Saks Fifth Avenue in New York City on June 7

In response to George Floyd's murder and the subsequent protests, various companies made public statements against racism and injustice and displayed other forms of support.

On June 4, the CEO of LinkedIn apologized after a company meeting to address the George Floyd protests saw some employees make racially insensitive comments.

In response to complaints on social media reflecting similar complaints mentioned in a racial discrimination lawsuit, Walmart announced it would no longer store hair care products appropriate for most African Americans in locked security cases–products for other types of hair were not similarly locked away–in the few stores that had done so.

==== Media industry ====
The entertainment industry was overwhelmingly supportive of the protests, exhibited by corporations voicing support for Black Lives Matter causes and a number of celebrities attending protests and making donations.

Actors such as Jamie Foxx, Nick Cannon, and Kendrick Sampson—among others—attended protests, while Blake Lively and her husband Ryan Reynolds donated a record $200,000 to the NAACP. Actor Cole Sprouse was reportedly taken into custody among other protestors during protests in Santa Monica, California. Much of the music industry called for an organized "blackout" on June 2 while prominent musicians such as Ariana Grande, Beyoncé, Chance the Rapper, Halsey, J. Cole and Joe Jonas attended protests or otherwise voiced support for the cause. Jay-Z spoke to the Governor of Minnesota to weigh in on justice for George Floyd while Drake and The Weeknd donated to pro-Black Lives Matter causes. Taylor Swift made headlines by denouncing President Trump on Twitter for "stoking the fires of racism." The tweet went on to become the 15th most liked tweet of all time, garnering 2.2 million likes as of June 2020. K-pop group BTS, with the support of their agency BigHit Entertainment, donated $1,000,000 to the BLM movement. Following this announcement, fans of the group ran a #MatchAMillion campaign, which raised an additional $1,026,531 within a day to be split between various BLM-related organizations. Kanye West donated $2,000,000 to the families of George Floyd, set up a 529 college fund for George Floyd's daughter, and funded Breonna Taylor and Ahmaud Arbery's attorney fees. He was also seen attending a protest in Chicago.

Television networks owned by ViacomCBS, including BET, CBS Sports Network, CMT, Comedy Central, Logo TV, MTV, Nickelodeon, Paramount Network, Pop TV, the Smithsonian Channel, TV Land, and VH1 suspended regular programming for 8 minutes and 46 seconds on June 1 at 5:00 p.m. Eastern Time as a tribute to George Floyd. The networks aired a video with the caption "I can't breathe" accompanied with breathing sounds, while Nickelodeon aired a separate scrolling video containing language from the Declaration of Kids' Rights, which the network first created on June 7, 1990. On June 2, Discovery, Inc. displayed blackout screens as part of "Blackout Tuesday" for the same length of time on its 19 domestic channels in the U.S. On June 9 and 10, the same channels suspended programming for an hour each day at 9 p.m. Eastern time to broadcast a virtual roundtable discussion with African-American politicians, commentators, and entertainers. The show, moderated by Oprah Winfrey, was called OWN Spotlight: Where Do We Go From Here? Procter and Gamble was a presenting sponsor, and Essence magazine also bought air time to promote a contest for black female entrepreneurs.

Netflix was the first major studio to issue a statement supporting Black Lives Matter in the wake of protests. YouTube pledged $1,000,000 to combat social injustice. Lego announced they would cease advertising White House and police-related toys, pledging $4 million towards education on racism and helping African American children. The Walt Disney Company pledged $5 million supporting nonprofit organizations advancing social justice, including a $2 million donation to the NAACP. CEO Bob Chapek and executive chairman Bob Iger released a statement to Disney employees promising "real change" in the wake of George Floyd's death. The cast of Brooklyn Nine-Nine, a police comedy series, along with showrunner Dan Goor, donated $100,000 to The National Bail Fund Network while also condemning Floyd's death. Stephanie Beatriz, who plays Rosa Diaz on Brooklyn Nine-Nine, made a personal donation to the fund while encouraging actors who portray police on television to do so as well. Meanwhile, Amazon Studios issued a statement supporting Black Lives Matter. Amazon Prime Video started displaying African-American themed selections in a prominent Black Lives Matter category.

Many members of the video game industry supported the protests and Black Lives Matter. Electronic Arts, 2K Games and Humble Bundle committed US$1 million towards black-oriented charities and foundations. Ubisoft, Square Enix, and The Pokémon Company also made significant financial commitments to the cause.

==== Sports industry ====
Much of the sports industry was supportive of the protesters demanding justice for George Floyd. Several footballers across different leagues including Jadon Sancho, Romelu Lukaku, Marcus Rashford, among other, have shown full solidarity towards the issue. In June 2020, Raheem Sterling on the BBC programme Newsnight, reacting to anti-racism protests around the world said that this is the time to speak up against injustice, especially in football. The forward remarked that there are 500 players in the Premier League of which one-third constitute of blacks, but the hierarchy has no black representative for blacks in the management. "It's not just taking the knee, it is about giving people the chance they deserve," he lamented on Floyd's death and lack of acceptance for black worldwide. On June 17, 2020, more than 3 months after the Premier League resumed, Aston Villa and Sheffield United players took a knee in support of the BLM movement before the match.

Six-time Formula One champion Lewis Hamilton, who is the sport's first and only black driver has criticized the industry for the silence over the matter on Instagram. This has led to his fellow drivers expressing their views with several others supporting the campaign. Formula One also issued a statement echoing Hamilton's post. Hamilton has also launched a commission to improve diversity in racing, with Formula One launching an initiative known as "We Race As One" to tackle racial injustice. Former Formula One Group chairman Bernie Ecclestone caused controversy when he questioned Hamilton's initiative and adding that "Black people are more racist than what White people are". This has caused Hamilton to hit back at Ecclestone, calling Ecclestone as "ignorant and uneducated", with Formula One issuing a statement saying that they "completely disagree with Bernie Ecclestone’s comments that have no place in Formula 1 or society".

NASCAR has banned Confederate flags at all of their events, following a call by driver Bubba Wallace for a ban of the flags. An incident occurred during the GEICO 500 weekend, when a noose was discovered in Wallace's garage at the Talladega Superspeedway. Following an investigation, the FBI concluded that Wallace was not a victim of hate crime, but the noose had been there since October 2019.

CrossFit CEO Greg Glassman was forced to resign over his response to Floyd's murder; over a thousand gyms, top CrossFit athletes, and Reebok and Rogue Fitness dropped partnerships with the company.

In June 2020, The England and Wales Cricket Board (ECB) showed staunch support towards the black lives matter movement and acknowledged that cricket is also not immune to systematic racism. However, the board affirmed that it will address the issue and try to bring “meaningful and long-term change” to the game. “We will now work to engage community leaders and black influencers within cricket so that we can review and evolve our existing inclusion and diversity work and specifically address the issues raised by the black community,” it added.

In July 2020, Patty Mills said that he would play in the NBA restart and donate his entire salary for 2020 towards fighting racism. The NBA star revealed that the amount would precisely be $1,017,818.54 and said that it would be bifurcated and donated towards Black Lives Matter Australia among other racism related concerns.

=== Philanthropy ===
A report by the McKinsey Institute for Black Economic Mobility "analyz[ed] the announced financial commitments of more than 1,100 companies and philanthropic institutions" up to May 2021, concluding "that companies have dedicated $200 billion to increase efforts toward racial justice since the murder of George Floyd on May 25, 2020" (with almost 90% of this sum coming from financial institutions), and that "Much of these funds are being committed to providing affordable housing, lending in low- and middle-income and minority communities, and community development. Similarly, an August 2021 Washington Post analysis found that "America’s 50 biggest public companies and their foundations collectively committed at least $49.5 billion since Floyd’s murder last May to addressing racial inequality — an amount that appears unequaled in sheer scale." However, it noted that "more than 90 percent of that amount — $45.2 billion — is allocated as loans or investments they could stand to profit from, more than half in the form of mortgages. Two banks — JPMorgan Chase and Bank of America — accounted for nearly all of those commitments."

George Soros' Open Society Foundations announced in July 2020 it would make US$150 million in grants for Black-led racial justice groups, and US$70 million in local grants for criminal justice reform and civic engagement opportunities. Its president said the foundations saw this as a way to harness the momentum toward racial justice, a moment it has been "investing in for the last 25 years”. The New York Times expected that the initiative would "reshape the landscape of Black political and civil rights organizations", signaling the extent to which race and identity have become the explicit focal point of American politics in recent years, and position Soros' foundation "near the forefront of the protest movement".

=== Community organizations ===
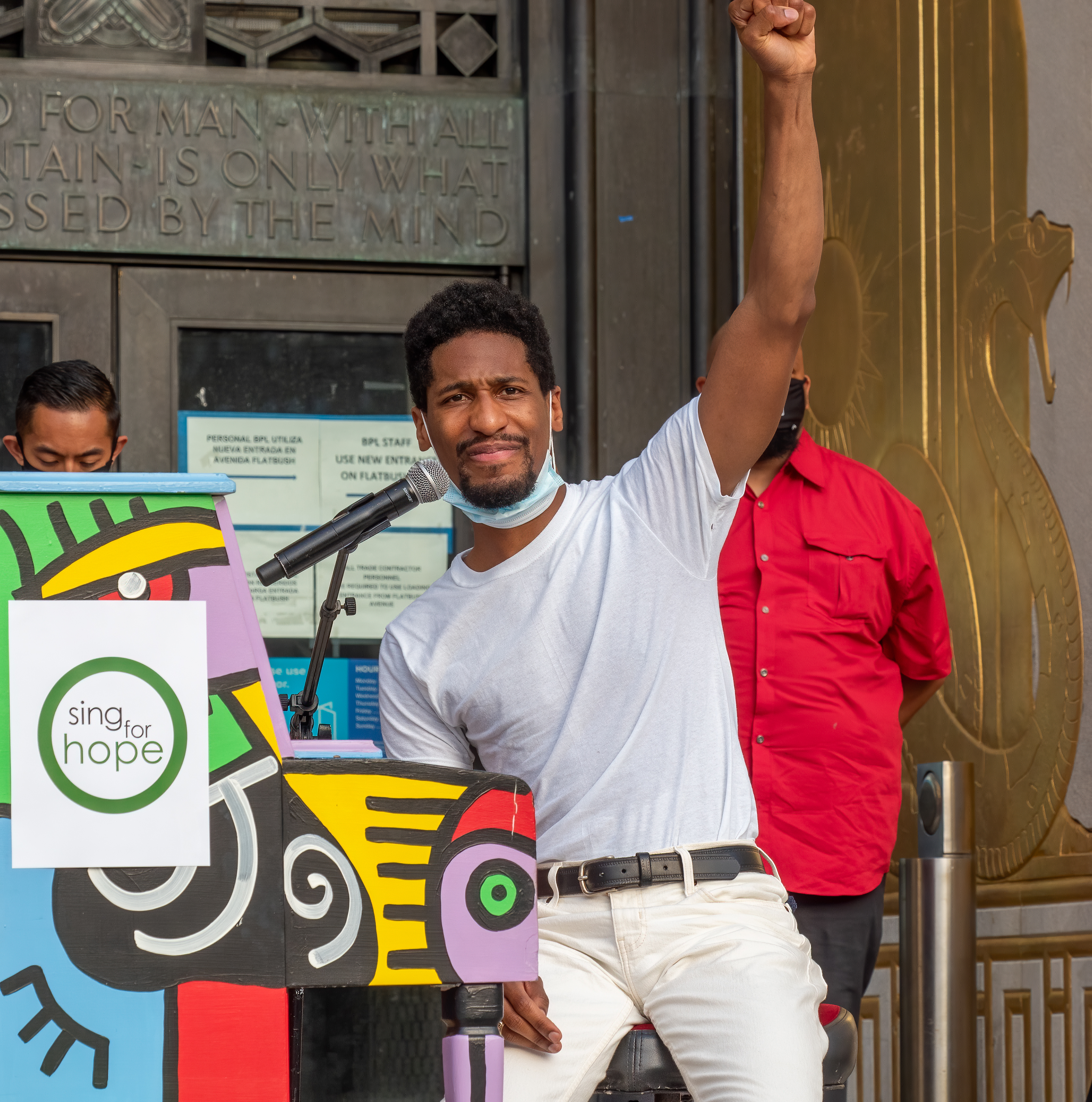
Musician Jon Batiste in Brooklyn on Juneteenth 2020

Various community organizations have responded to the events with messages condemning racism.

Organizations representing most religious organizations in the United States, including the National Council of Churches, numerous bishops representing various churches, 26 Jewish organizations, the Hindu American Foundation (HAF), the Sikh Coalition, the Buddhist Churches of America and others released statements condemning the murder of George Floyd and calling for racial justice.

Multiple community organizations representing South Asians including the Association of Indian American Doctors and various branches of the Federation of Indian Associations have also issued statements about the incident.

=== Backlash ===
The protests were met with counter-protesters and disruption in some places, such as in rural Oregon. There have been various reports of Proud Boys and people with anti-federal government and/or white supremacist ideals such as the Boogaloo movement infiltrating protests as part of a larger strategy of causing a "race war", or a "second Civil War." Individuals associated with these movements have been charged in connection with terrorist plots, car attacks, and shootings that have taken place in conjunction with the protests.

A spate of anti-Black hate crimes has been reported amidst the protests, along with increased online hate speech. Some George Floyd murals have been vandalized. A number of Facebook groups have reportedly used George Floyd's name as a cloak to help spread white supremacist rhetoric.

== International ==
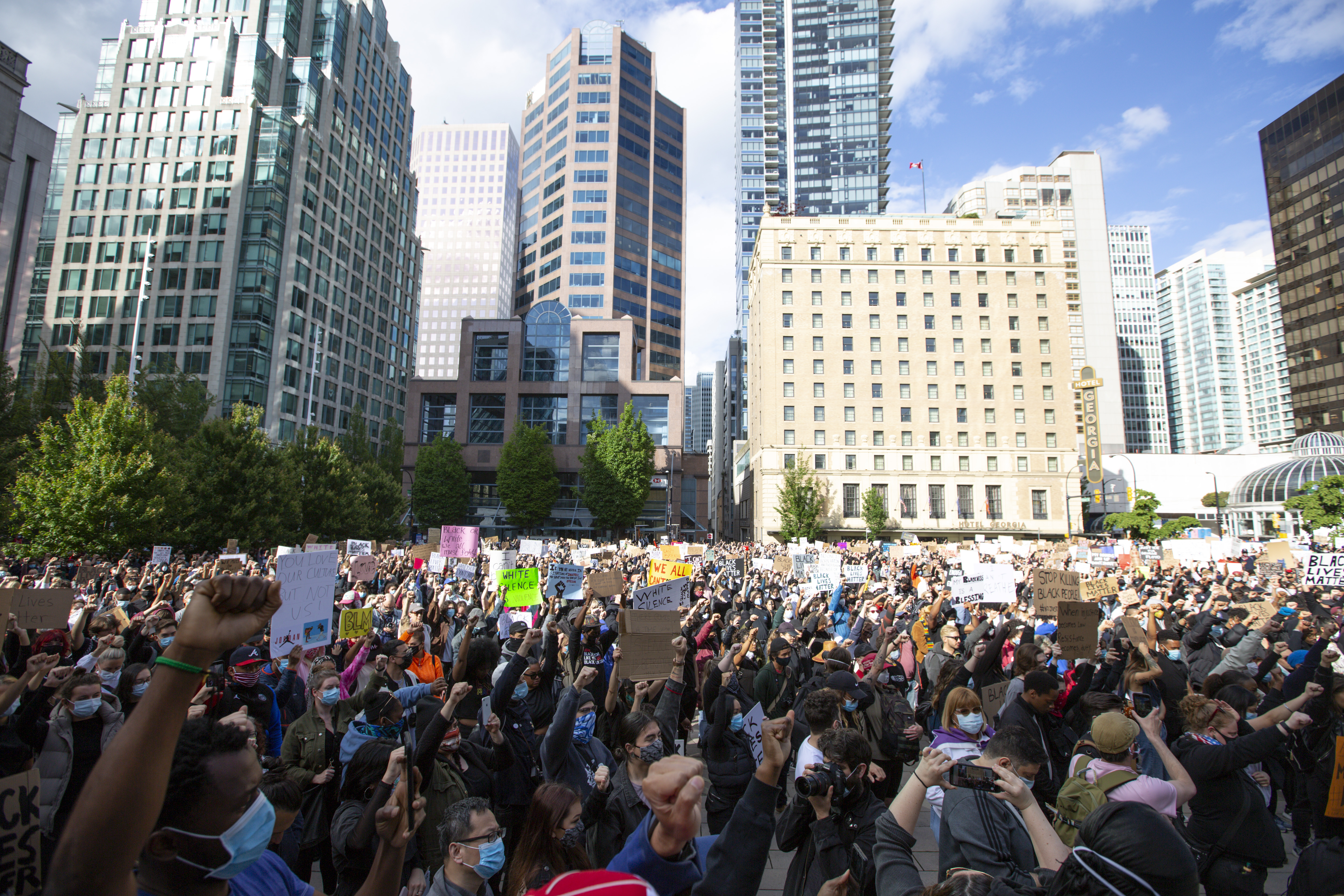
Protest in Vancouver on May 31

=== Countries or places ===
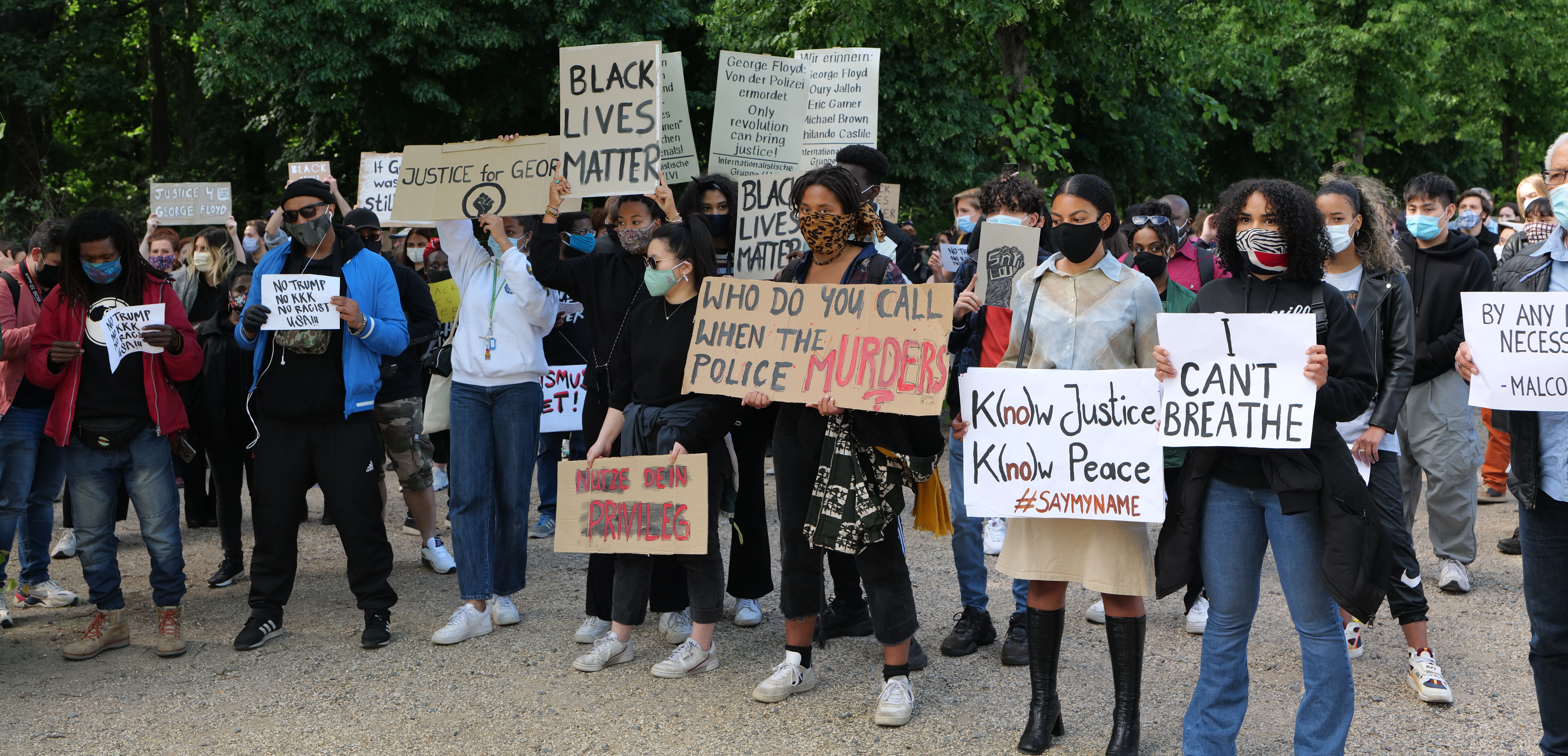
Protest at the U.S. embassy in Berlin on May 30, 2020

Protest at Königsplatz in Munich on June 6, 2020

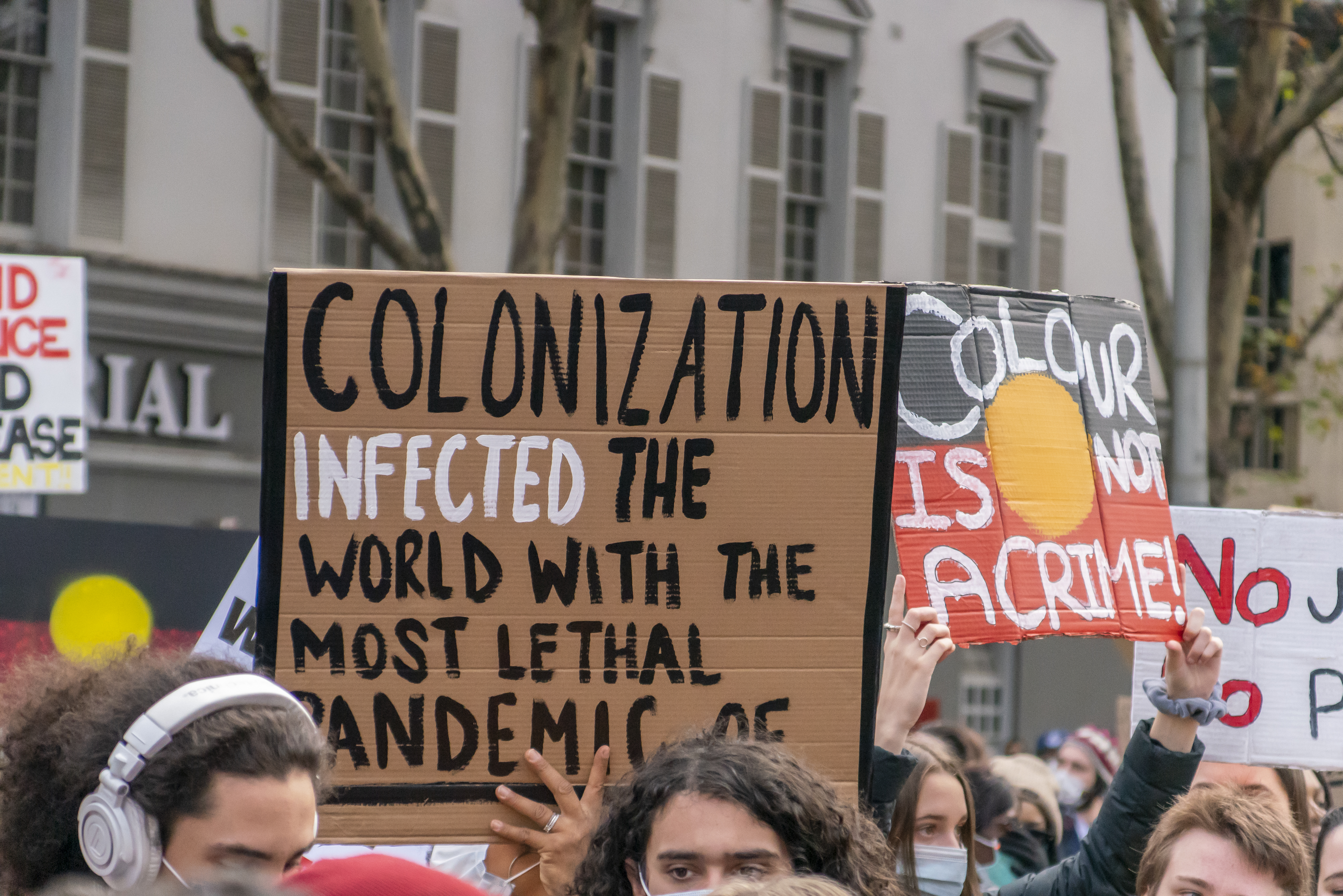
Protest in Melbourne on June 6

- Argentina – President Alberto Fernández said in an interview that for those who have lived in the U.S. (like Fernández had before), those images are "unthinkable", and compared the pictures of the protests to those seen in the 2019 film Joker: Referring to Floyd's video, "What does that reaction mean? It is the reaction to inequality and the treatment that a community receives, and is the black community in the United States that suffers every so often attitudes like the one we saw filmed", and making a further comment about it: "It is a demeaning action to the human condition: someone who leans on the neck of someone lying on the floor who is telling him that he suffocates, and still lets him suffocate." He lamented, "We have to learn that an individual cannot live in peace with inequality, one cannot pretend to be distracted by inequality. We have to work to give better life quality and opportunities for all."
- Australia – Prime Minister Scott Morrison stated his beliefs that violent protests would not create change. He warned against Australian demonstrations taking a similar course as "there's no need to import things happening in other countries."
- Brazil – President Jair Bolsonaro expressed "regret" over the murder of Floyd, but attempted to distance ongoing protests in Brazil from their U.S. counterparts, stating that "racism [in the United States] is a little different from Brazil". He also shared a post by President Trump regarding the U.S. designating antifa as a terrorist organization.
- Cambodia - Prime Minister Hun Sen was quoted saying "Where are Brad Adams and Human Rights Watch? Where are they now? Why haven’t we heard its [sic] cries for human rights?", adding that, “When Cambodia curbs demonstrations, they say Cambodia violates human rights. But when other countries clamp down on demonstrations, they say it’s a measure to safeguard social order".
- Canada – Prime Minister Justin Trudeau called for Canada to "stand together in solidarity" against racial discrimination. He said Canadians are watching the police violence in the United States in "shock and horror." When Trudeau was asked about Trump's threats to use military force against protesters, he paused for 25 seconds before responding diplomatically.
- China – The Ministry of Foreign Affairs said that "Black Lives Matter and their human rights should be protected," adding that they hoped that the U.S. government "would take all necessary measures to deal with the violent law enforcement of police, so as to protect and safeguard the legitimate interests of racial minorities." However, both state media and individual officials also criticized the United States government and accused it of hypocrisy. The Foreign Ministry spokesman Zhao Lijian accused the United States of having a 'double standard' for labeling U.S. protesters disappointed with racism as rioters while glorifying the Hong Kong protesters as heroes, and for shooting U.S. protesters and mobilizing the National Guard while criticizing the Hong Kong police.
  - Hong Kong – Chief Executive Carrie Lam decried what was perceived as a 'double standard' in America's reaction to protests in Hong Kong and their protests at home.
- Cuba – Foreign Minister Bruno Rodríguez Parrilla tweeted that George Floyd "did not 'pass away.' He was brutally murdered. Unfortunately this is a well known story for African-Americans. He was unarmed and shouting 'I can't breathe,' but that wasn't enough to prevent an injustice. Our skin color should not define us. #BlackLivesMatter."
- France – Foreign Minister Jean-Yves Le Drian said "any act of violence committed against peaceful protesters or journalists is unacceptable, in the United States or elsewhere."
- Germany – Foreign Minister Heiko Maas said on Twitter that the peaceful protests in the United States following the murder of George Floyd are "understandable and more than legitimate," and that peaceful protests must always be allowed.
- Ghana – President Nana Akufo-Addo said "black people the world over were shocked and distraught" by Floyd's murder, and expressed his condolences to Floyd's family and his hope that there would be "lasting change" in how America "confronts the problems of hate and racism."
- Holy See – Pope Francis called for "national reconciliation" in the U.S. saying that racism is "intolerable" and that the violence that erupted on the streets is "self-destructive and self-defeating."
- India – Prime Minister Narendra Modi "expressed concern regarding the ongoing civil disturbances in the US, and conveyed his best wishes for an early resolution of the situation" during a call with President Trump.
- Iran – On May 30, the Ministry of Foreign Affairs condemned "the tragic murder of black people and deadly racial discrimination in the United States." It added that "the voices of the protesters must be heard ... (and) the repression of suffering Americans must be stopped immediately." Two days later, a Ministry spokesman said at a news conference, speaking in English, "To the American officials and police: stop violence against your people and let them breathe." In a televised speech on June 3, Supreme Leader Ali Khamenei stated that in the United States, "they kill people and they are being arrogant, but then they come and talk about human rights. Wasn't that black man who got killed a human and didn't he have rights?."
- Ireland – On June 4, Taoiseach Leo Varadkar expressed "genuine revulsion" at the "heavy-handed response" of the U.S. government towards the free press and protesters, and stated "And we've witnessed the absence of moral leadership or words of understanding, comfort or healing from whence they should have come." Many other political leaders in Ireland, such as Mary Lou McDonald of Sinn Féin, Alan Kelly of the Labour Party and Richard Boyd Barrett of People before Profit denounced racism both in the U.S. and Ireland, and criticised the Trump administration's handling of it in the US. The Irish Parliament, the Dáil observed a minute's silence in respect for those impacted by racism around the world, including George Floyd. Varadkar said that Ireland must take note from the issues coming out of America and address racism in Ireland as well.
- Jamaica – Prime Minister Andrew Holness said he was personally 'horrified and saddened' by the murder of George Floyd, and stated that he joined other world leaders in condemning the situation of racism and discrimination in the United States. The government's National Council on Reparations acknowledged the prime minister's statements and said they 'join hands in solidarity with our African American brothers and sisters'.
- Malaysia - Foreign Minister Hishammuddin Tun Hussein advised Malaysians to avoid the protest areas and follow the curfew orders. He further stated on Twitter that "The situation in the US is very uncertain now following protests in several cities... Take care & #StaySafe!" Following the death and protest of George Floyd, The Human Rights Commission of Malaysia (SUHAKAM) also expressed solidarity for the George Floyd's memorial service.
- Mexico – President Andrés Manuel López Obrador pronounced himself to be against "racism, xenophobia, and classism, whatever they take place.". He also highlighted the figures of Martin Luther King Jr., Mahatma Gandhi and Nelson Mandela.
- Netherlands – On June 4, during a press conference about whether the Dutch could go on foreign holiday that year, Prime Minister Mark Rutte called the murder of George Floyd "unacceptable."
- New Zealand – Prime Minister Jacinda Ardern has stated that she was "horrified" by the situation around the murder of George Floyd. Ardern had been criticized by local Black Lives Matter solidarity protesters for remaining silent about Floyd's death for a week.
- North Korea – A state newspaper said in a publication that "demonstrators enraged by the extreme racists throng even to the White House", used ad hominem to refer to U.S. Secretary of State Mike Pompeo and touted China's rise above the United States.
- Philippines – President Rodrigo Duterte expressed dismay over the protests and attempted to favorably contrast the "law-abiding" people of the Philippines to the protesters.
- Russia – The Foreign Ministry condemned the police violence and arrest of journalists amid the protests, remarking that "this incident is not the first in the string of incidents exposing lawlessness and unjustified violence by 'guardians of law and order' in the United States." Maria Zakharova, the ministry's spokesperson, further commented that in light of the protests, the U.S. "no longer had the authority" to criticize others regarding human rights. On June 14, President Vladimir Putin stated that when protests "turn into mayhem and pogroms, I see nothing good for the country", and described removal of statues as "undoubtedly a destructive phenomenon".
  - Chechnya – Head of the Chechen Republic Ramzan Kadyrov said Trump needs to "end the mayhem" and "illegal actions against citizens." He continued, "Police are lynching people right on the streets of American cities....They are strangling citizens, beating them up, ramming them with cars." Kadyrov called on the United Nations to intervene.
- Saudi Arabia – The Saudi Permanent Representative to the United Nations, Abdallah Al-Mouallimi, described the protests as an "indication of the vitality of American society" and claimed that they showed "the strength of that society, its ability to mobilize in the face of crisis". Although he lamented "shortcomings in the American system concerning racism and discrimination", he expressed hope the U.S. "will be able to overcome the current difficulty they are now going through".
- South Africa – The government released a statement in which it called for all, especially security forces, to exercise maximum restraint in responding to the anger and frustration of protesters. The statement also highlighted that "just as the people of America supported South Africa in its legitimate struggle against apartheid, South Africa too supports the clarion calls for practical action to address the inadequacies highlighted by protesters, civil society and human rights organizations."
- Spain – Prime Minister Pedro Sánchez expressed his solidarity with the protests and his concern about the "authoritarian" ways in which the protests have been responded to during a parliamentary session. His Second Deputy Prime Minister, Pablo Iglesias, posted a tweet with the word "ANTIFA" in response to Trump's intentions to declare Antifa a terrorist organization. Sánchez has considered that everyone must unite to combat what he considers "the evil of our time", the extreme right, and has supported some demonstrations that, he said, "have in their genesis some of the most difficult elements in construction of a great country", the United States, to which he has expressed his respect.
- Turkey – President Recep Tayyip Erdogan said a "racist and fascist" approach led to Floyd's death and said that "[we] will be monitoring the issue." The Foreign Minister Mevlüt Çavuşoğlu added on June 3 that "it is unacceptable for police to kill any person in such a way, regardless of race or religion... Justice must be done" but also that "No matter who it is, we do not support such vandalism, not just in the U.S. but also in other countries." Çavuşoğlu also endorsed Trump's announcement that he would designate Antifa a domestic terrorist organization, and Erdogan claimed to Trump that those committing violence and looting during the protests were linked to the People's Protection Units in Syria.
- United Kingdom – The Foreign Office reacted to the arrest of a journalist and said that "journalists all around the world must be free to do their job and hold authorities to account without fear of retribution." Foreign Secretary Dominic Raab commented that the footage of Floyd's arrest was "very distressing" but said that it is "not his job" to comment on the U.S. president's response to the protests. Prime Minister Boris Johnson told Parliament that "black lives matter", and added, "I also support, as I've said, the right to protest." On June 5, the British embassy in Washington, D.C., raised the issue of the treatment of British journalists by U.S. police, a spokesman for the Prime Minister said.
- Venezuela – Foreign Minister Jorge Arreaza condemned the "prejudiced language" used by Trump in describing the protesters. He also said Trump's used language resembled the policy of "shoot first, ask later."
- Zimbabwe – The government of Zimbabwe summoned Brian A. Nichols, the U.S. ambassador to Zimbabwe, to a meeting over remarks by White House official Robert C. O'Brien that Zimbabwe is a "foreign adversary" that could face retaliation for "fomenting" the protests.

=== Organizations ===
- African Union – Head of the African Union Commission Moussa Faki Mahamat described Floyd's death as a "murder", stating that the African Union condemned the "continuing discriminatory practices against black citizens of the USA."
- European Union – European Union Foreign Policy chief Josep Borrell stated that the EU is "shocked and appalled" by Floyd's death and attributed it to "abuse of power" by law enforcement. He also warned against further "excessive use of force".
- United Nations – UN High Commissioner on Human Rights Michelle Bachelet condemned Floyd's murder, urging American authorities to take "serious action" to stop the killings of unarmed minorities. UN Secretary-General António Guterres said that he was "heartbroken to see violence on the streets in our host country and our host city of New York". He also called for peaceful protests and restraint from security forces responding to the protests, concluding that "racism is abhorrent." After hearing from George Floyd's brother, Philonise Floyd; the UN Human Rights Council unanimously adopted a resolution at its fifth-ever Urgent Debate asking the UN High Commissioner on Human Rights to prepare a report "on systemic racism, violations of international human rights law against Africans and people of African descent by law enforcement agencies” as well as an examination of government responses to "anti-racism peaceful process peaceful protests."
- Amnesty International – The organization released a press release calling for the police in the United States to end excessive militarized responses to the protests. It also called on the UK to review exports of security equipment, including tear gas or rubber bullets, to U.S. police forces.
- Human Rights Watch said they were "appalled" by the footage of the arrest and said that "no one should ever be subject to such gratuitous violence". It also added that "George Floyd's cruel and pointless death, and the litany of black lives that were lost before, reconfirms our commitment to combat these injustices."

== See also ==
- List of changes made due to the George Floyd protests
