= The Last Stone =

2019 nonfiction crime book

The Last Stone: A Masterpiece of Criminal Interrogation
- Author: Mark Bowden
- Language: English
- Genre: non-fiction
- Publisher: Atlantic Monthly
- Publication date: April 2, 2019
- Publication place: United States
- Pages: 304
- ISBN: 978-0-8021-4730-1

The Last Stone: A Masterpiece of Criminal Interrogation is a 2019 book by Mark Bowden. It tells the story of the reopening of the case of the murders of Katherine and Sheila Lyon, two sisters who disappeared from a Maryland shopping mall in 1975.

Following a 2013 cold case re-investigation into the sisters' disappearance, one of the perpetrators, Lloyd Lee Welch Jr., was indicted upon two first-degree murder charges in 2015; he was later convicted of the children's murder and sentenced to two concurrent 48-year sentences in relation to each count of first-degree murder.

Bowden had covered the disappearance for the Baltimore News-American.
