= Murders of Katherine and Sheila Lyon =

1975 murders in Wheaton, Maryland, U.S.

Katherine and Sheila Lyon
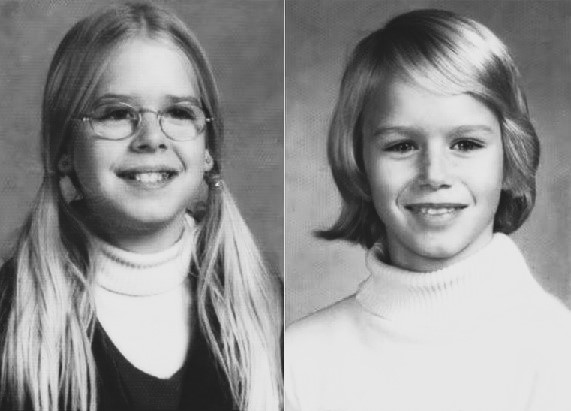
- Sheila (left) and Katherine Lyon
- Born: Katherine Mary Lyon; March 29, 1964; Sheila Mary Lyon; March 30, 1962
- Disappeared: March 25, 1975; Wheaton, Maryland, U.S. 39.0367°N 77.0551°W
- Died: c. March 26, 1975
- Cause of death: Undetermined, homicide
- Resting place: Unknown. Possibly Taylor's Mountain, Thaxton, Virginia; 37.3899°N 79.6673°W (approximate)
- Other name: The Lyon Sisters
- Occupation: Students
- Known for: Missing persons Murder victims
- Height: Katherine: 4 ft 8 in (1.42 m); Sheila: 5 ft 2 in (1.57 m)
- Distinguishing features: Katherine: Caucasian female. 85 pounds. Blonde hair, blue eyes. Birthmark on inside of upper thigh. Sheila: Caucasian female. 100 pounds. Blonde hair, blue eyes. Far-sighted. Wears spectacles with gold wire rims.

The murders of Katherine and Sheila Lyon were the abduction, sexual abuse and murder of two sisters – aged 10 and 12 respectively – who disappeared from a shopping center in Wheaton, Maryland, on March 25, 1975.

Described as a crime which shattered the innocence of the suburbs of Maryland, the disappearance of Katherine and Sheila Lyon initiated one of the largest police investigations in the history of the Washington metropolitan area, although their fate would remain unknown for thirty-eight years, by which time their disappearance had long become a cold case.

A re-investigation of the sisters' disappearance in 2013 led detectives to charge a convicted child sex offender named Lloyd Lee Welch Jr. with the first-degree murder of the Lyon sisters. Welch was indicted for their murders in July 2015; he pleaded guilty to two counts of first-degree murder in September 2017 via a plea bargain in which he admitted to participating in the girls' abduction, but not their sexual assault and murder. He was sentenced to two concurrent terms of 48 years' imprisonment.

The bodies of Katherine and Sheila Lyon have never been found, although authorities believe their bodies were burned and buried upon a remote mountain in Bedford County, Virginia. Furthermore, prosecutors have named other members of Welch's family – including his uncle – as persons of interest in the girls' abduction, abuse and murder, although no other individuals have been charged due to insufficient evidence.

== Background ==
=== Childhood ===
Katherine and Sheila Lyon were born in Kensington, Maryland, a suburb of Washington, D.C., to John and Mary Lyon. The girls were two of four children and the only girls born to their parents, with an older brother, Jay, and a younger brother, Joseph, completing the family. The Lyon children lived in a close, middle-class household on Plyers Mill Road. Their father was a well-known and popular radio personality at WMAL-AM, a local radio station operated by the then-owner of ABC affiliate WMAL-TV (now WJLA-TV) and the now-defunct Washington Star. (Note: John Lyon would later work as a victims' counselor.)

By 1975, the oldest Lyon sibling, Jay, was 15 years old; the youngest sibling, Joseph, was nine. Sheila was 12 years old, and Katherine ten. Sheila attended Newport Junior High School, and Katherine Oakland Terrace Elementary. Both sisters were days away from celebrating their thirteenth and eleventh birthdays and both had known their parents had planned to take them for a special meal for their birthdays. According to their mother, neither girl "[could] wait" for the upcoming occasion.

=== March 25, 1975 ===
March 25, 1975, was the second day of school spring vacation; as such, the four Lyon children woke at approximately 10 a.m. Shortly after eating breakfast, the Lyon brothers visited a local basketball court; Katherine and Sheila opted to walk to the Wheaton Plaza shopping center (now Westfield Wheaton) to browse Easter exhibits and meet friends who frequently socialized at this location. Upon hearing of her daughters' plans, Mary Lyon suggested: "Why don't you stop off and get some pizza?" The sisters agreed, with Katherine lightheartedly remarking the price of a slice of pizza had recently increased from forty cents to forty-five-cents.

The girls left their home between 11 a.m. and midday; each had approximately $2 to her name (the equivalent of about $12.05 as of 2026), and both were told to be home by their 4 p.m. curfew. At the insistence of a friend, Mary Lyon later visited a bowling alley; she was driven to the bowling alley by her husband, who – working a night shift – woke at midday.

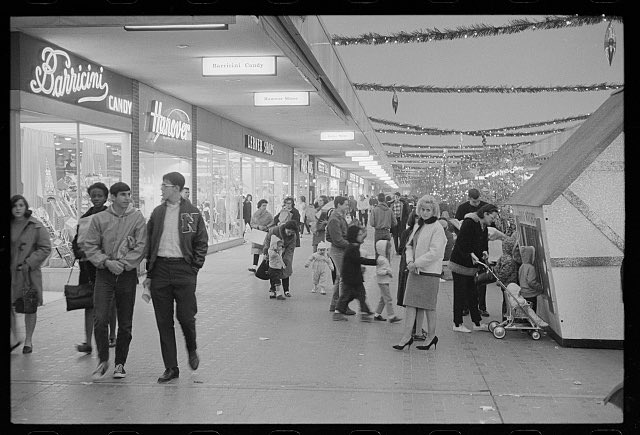
The Wheaton Plaza shopping center, seen here in 1965. Katherine and Sheila Lyon were abducted from this shopping center in 1975.

== Disappearance ==
The Wheaton Plaza shopping center was located approximately half a mile from the Lyon household. The sisters are believed to have intended to eat lunch at a popular pizza parlor within the shopping center named the Orange Bowl. Both girls were seen by eyewitnesses talking with an unidentified middle-aged man close to the Orange Bowl less than an hour after they are believed to have arrived at the shopping center; their older brother, Jay, later informed investigators he had seen his sisters eating pizza together at this same eatery, although his sisters were alone. Jay's sighting of his sisters is believed to have occurred after the girls had spoken with the middle-aged individual.

Shortly after 2 p.m., Katherine and Sheila were seen walking home from the shopping center. This would prove to be the final verifiable account of the sisters' movements. By 5:45, Mary Lyon had begun preparing the family's evening meal of fried chicken; she later recollected feeling slightly annoyed her daughters had not returned home by this time. This annoyance rapidly developed into panic, and by 7 p.m., police were notified of the girls' disappearance. An extensive search was immediately implemented and the Lyon family initiated a round-the-clock vigil whereby a family member would be invariably within arm's reach of the family telephone.

== Police investigation ==
Police rapidly determined the sisters' disappearance was involuntary, and an intense search to locate the children was immediately implemented. House-to-house searches were conducted, numerous witnesses were interviewed and hundreds of public tips pursued. With the assistance of search and rescue dogs, an extensive search of terrain surrounding both the shopping center and the Lyon household was implemented; these search and rescue dogs did detect a trail the sisters had likely taken from the shopping center toward the perimeter of a parking lot adjacent to a department store close to the premises, although the trail ended at this location. Scuba divers also searched lakes and ponds and locations such as storm sewers, vacant lots, rivers and stream beds. Numerous civilian volunteers assisted these official searches, although all efforts proved fruitless. A reward of $9,000 was also offered for the sisters' safe return. (Note: This reward sum would increase to $19,000 by late April 1975.)

Due to the fact two children had disappeared as opposed to one, investigators suspected more than one individual may have been involved in their abduction. Suspecting a likely sexual motive behind the sisters' abduction, several known pedophiles and sex offenders were questioned in the weeks following their disappearance; all were eliminated from the inquiry upon verification of their alibis.

=== Family efforts ===
The Lyon family themselves immediately pursued all tangible methods to locate their daughters, including conducting searches around their neighborhood, and printing and distributing missing persons flyers in addition to pursuing leads generated by psychics. Both the family and police received numerous calls from hoax callers, attention-seekers and extortionists claiming to be holding the girls for ransom in the immediate aftermath of their disappearance. One of these calls was received from an anonymous male caller on April 4, 1975; this individual demanded that John Lyon leave a briefcase with $10,000 (the equivalent of about $60,200 as of 2026) inside an Annapolis courthouse restroom. With approval from police, the girls' father left $101 (the equivalent of about $608 as of 2026) inside the briefcase as directed by law enforcement officials, (Note: This sum of money was sufficient to classify the crime as a felony.) but the briefcase was never claimed. This individual later called John and said he had seen too many police around the courthouse and thus did not attempt to retrieve the ransom. In response, John said he would only follow further instructions if he heard his daughters' voices. This anonymous caller never attempted to re-initiate contact.

== Eyewitness accounts ==
=== "Tape recorder man" ===
A neighborhood boy known to both sisters reported to police that he had seen the girls seated on a bench outside the Orange Bowl speaking with an unidentified man at approximately 1 p.m. The man had been approximately six feet in height, well-groomed, conservatively dressed, aged between 50 and 60 and wearing a brown suit and was carrying a briefcase with a tape recorder inside. According to this witness, both the Lyon sisters and other children present spoke into a microphone the man was holding, believing their voices were to be broadcast live upon a local radio station. The witness's description of the man carrying a briefcase outside the eatery led authorities to view the unknown person as a prime suspect in the case; he became colloquially referred to by investigators as the "tape recorder man." Two composite drawings of this individual were created.

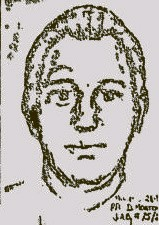
Composite drawing of the older individual seen in the company of the Lyon sisters in the Wheaton Plaza shopping center

Composite drawing of the younger suspect seen leering at the Lyon sisters in the shopping center

=== Younger male suspect ===
A friend of the sisters – a girl slightly older than Sheila named Danette Shea – also described to detectives how shortly before the sisters were last seen within the shopping center, a young, long-haired man had followed and stared at Shea and her friends for so long and so intently that one of her friends had confronted him, stating: "Why don't you take a picture of us? It'll last longer!" Shea had also observed this individual leering at the Lyon sisters. These sightings occurred at approximately the same time as the sisters and other children had spoken into the older man's microphone.

A police sketch artist also created a composite drawing based on this eyewitness's description; this depicted a white male in his late teens or early 20s, approximately 5 feet 11 inches (1.80 m), with notable acne on his face, scars on his left cheek, somewhat shabbily dressed, and wearing a light-colored Peters Jacket. Shea's eyewitness description contrasted sharply with the initial, middle-aged suspect. Aside from the major differences in facial features, hair and clothing, the young male leering at the sisters and the middle-aged man encouraging children to speak into his microphone were several decades apart in age.

The composite drawing of the younger male suspect, however, appears not to have been widely disseminated as investigators devoted greater focus upon tracing the middle-aged man holding the tape recorder, whom several eyewitnesses reported having seen in the vicinity of the shopping center on the day of, and day prior to, the sisters' disappearance. Nonetheless, investigators followed subsequent public reports from several individuals who said they recognized either or both of the individuals within the composite drawings.

== Investigative timeline ==
By the week following the Lyon sisters' disappearance, investigators had interviewed and corroborated enough eyewitness accounts to establish a timeline of the sisters' movements on the afternoon of March 25. This timeline of the children's movements prior to their disappearance was released to the public:

- 11 a.m. to midday: Katherine and Sheila leave their home to visit the Wheaton Plaza shopping center, having promised their mother to return home by 4 p.m.
- 1 p.m.: A neighborhood child – a friend of both sisters – sees the girls sitting together outside the Orange Bowl speaking to an unidentified middle-aged man.
- c. 2 p.m.: The girls' older brother, Jay, enters the shopping center to purchase a kite. He observes his sisters, alone, eating pizza at the Orange Bowl.
- c. 2:30 - 3 p.m.: The final verified sighting of the sisters occurs when a friend observes Katherine and Sheila walking westward down a street from the shopping center to their home.
- 4 p.m.: The curfew set by their mother passes; the girls are expected home and do not arrive.
- 7 p.m.: Police are called and an active search for the sisters is implemented.

== Lloyd Welch ==
On the day following the first media circulation of the composite drawing of the middle-aged man carrying a briefcase with a tape recorder – April 1, 1975 – an 18-year-old Appalachia native named Lloyd Lee Welch Jr. traveled to the shopping center to specifically inform a security guard he had seen a man matching the police description of the suspect at the premises on March 25. (Note: The description Welch provided matched eyewitness descriptions circulated in newspapers and upon television news media.) Welch corroborated existing eyewitness accounts of seeing the girls converse with this individual carrying a tape recorder and microphone, also describing overhearing the man state to the sisters he "recorded people's voices and put them on the radio." According to Welch, the older sister had giggled upon hearing this. Welch's statement further elaborated he had subsequently seen the man forcing the distressed children into a red Camaro with white upholstery before hurriedly driving from the scene.

=== Initial witness statement ===
Welch was interviewed at a nearby police station; he provided a six-page statement detailing the account he had outlined and consented to a polygraph test. When informed he had failed this test, Welch admitted he had provided false information. Contemporary case documents indicate he was released by police as an unreliable witness – possibly motivated by a desire to collect the publicized reward money for the arrest of the individual whom investigators considered a strong suspect in the case. Reportedly, Welch received a lecture about lying to police before he was allowed to leave the police station.

A one-page report was placed on top of the transcript of Welch's statement, with the words "polygraph (lied)" written atop the document; this document was filed among the voluminous records compiled by investigators pertaining to the investigation and remained accessible only via a search of police records.

== Further leads ==
On April 6, an 11-year-old boy named William Krebs reported he had seen the sisters inside a white two-door Pontiac sedan driving along U.S. Route 211 in Centreville, Virginia, shortly after they are believed to have been abducted. Krebs remained adamant one of the sisters, whom he identified as Katherine, had been weeping, while another blonde girl sat in the rear passenger seat. Although treated with caution, this sighting was given credibility, thus expanding the search radius. The following day, a witness in Manassas, Virginia, reported seeing two girls resembling the Lyon sisters in the rear of a beige 1968 Ford station wagon at approximately 7:30 p.m. on the date of their disappearance; this witness claimed that the children were bound and gagged. The driver of this vehicle closely resembled the middle-aged man in the composite sketch released to the public and the eyewitness further claimed that when the driver noted he was being followed, he sped through a red light in the direction of Interstate 66. The station wagon had Maryland license plates beginning with the possible combination "DMT-6" (the last two digits being obscured due to the bending of the license plate). The known combination was issued in Cumberland, Hagerstown, and Baltimore at the time.

Although this eyewitness report was initially treated as credible – briefly stirring a media frenzy – police later deemed the sighting "questionable". Nonetheless, the eyewitness account inspired a small army of mobile citizen band (CB) radio users to scour the vicinity of the sighting with a running commentary, but these well-meaning, yet somewhat amateur efforts failed to yield any tangible results as a search for matching plate numbers failed to locate any vehicle matching the known description.

Other contemporary press reports indicate that a man matching the sketch of the middle-aged individual at the shopping center had actually been seen a few weeks prior to the Lyon sisters' disappearance approaching several young girls and asking them to recite an answering machine message typed on an index card into his hand-held microphone. These incidents had occurred at the Marlow Heights Shopping Center and Iverson Mall, both in neighboring Prince George's County. Police never publicly acknowledged a direct link between these reports and the Lyon disappearance.

Although the media devoted considerable attention to the sisters' disappearance and press interest in the case remained intense for several weeks, no conclusive leads as to the girls' whereabouts emerged. On May 23, 1975, Maryland Lieutenant Governor Blair Lee ordered 122 National Guardsmen to participate in a search of a Montgomery County forest for the missing girls – again to no avail.

=== Cold case ===
Despite intense investigative efforts, the disappearance of the Lyon sisters gradually became a cold case. The girls' parents and older brother commended police efforts to bring a resolution to the case although by the summer of 1975, the family had resigned themselves to the fact the girls were most likely deceased. Nonetheless, police inquiries remained active, with the individual seen with the tape recorder remaining a primary focus of interest.

By the early 1980s, the Montgomery County Police Department continued to receive over a dozen annual public tips; although each was investigated, none of these leads bore fruit.

In March 1987, a child molester named Fred Howard Coffey briefly became a serious suspect in the Lyon sisters' disappearance following his conviction for the molestation of three North Carolina children and learning of his impending trial for the July 1979 molestation, beating, and fatal strangulation of ten-year-old Amanda Marie Ray in Charlotte, North Carolina.

Via researching Coffey's movements, authorities discovered he had been in Montgomery County in the week following the Lyon sisters' disappearance. In addition, Coffey is known to have attracted the initial attention of several of his victims using devices such as metal detectors and fishing rods to initiate conversation and gain their trust. Although Coffey was younger than the middle-aged individual described by eyewitnesses as initiating conversation with the Lyon sisters and others via his tape recorder, the method of ensnaring children via this modus operandi piqued investigators' interest.

Although authorities were able to establish Coffey had been employed as a computer data employee at an Aspen Hill firm between April 24 and July 31, 1975, and that he had been interviewed for this position on April 1, investigators were unable to determine his whereabouts on March 25. Ultimately, investigators were unable to establish any definitive link between Coffey and the sisters' disappearance. He was never charged in relation to the case.

== 2013 re-investigation ==
By 2013, many of the original investigators on the Lyon case had retired or died, and although the case continued to receive periodic reviews, little progress had been made. A decision was made to again review the archived case records with view to approaching the investigation afresh. Reviewing every record preserved from the original investigation, Montgomery County Police Department Sergeant Chris Homrock encountered Welch's original statement. Critically, Homrock noticed a mug shot taken of Welch in 1977 pertaining to a burglary closely matched the 1975 composite drawing of the young Caucasian man whom witnesses stated had leered at the Lyon girls within the Wheaton Plaza shopping center shortly before their abduction.

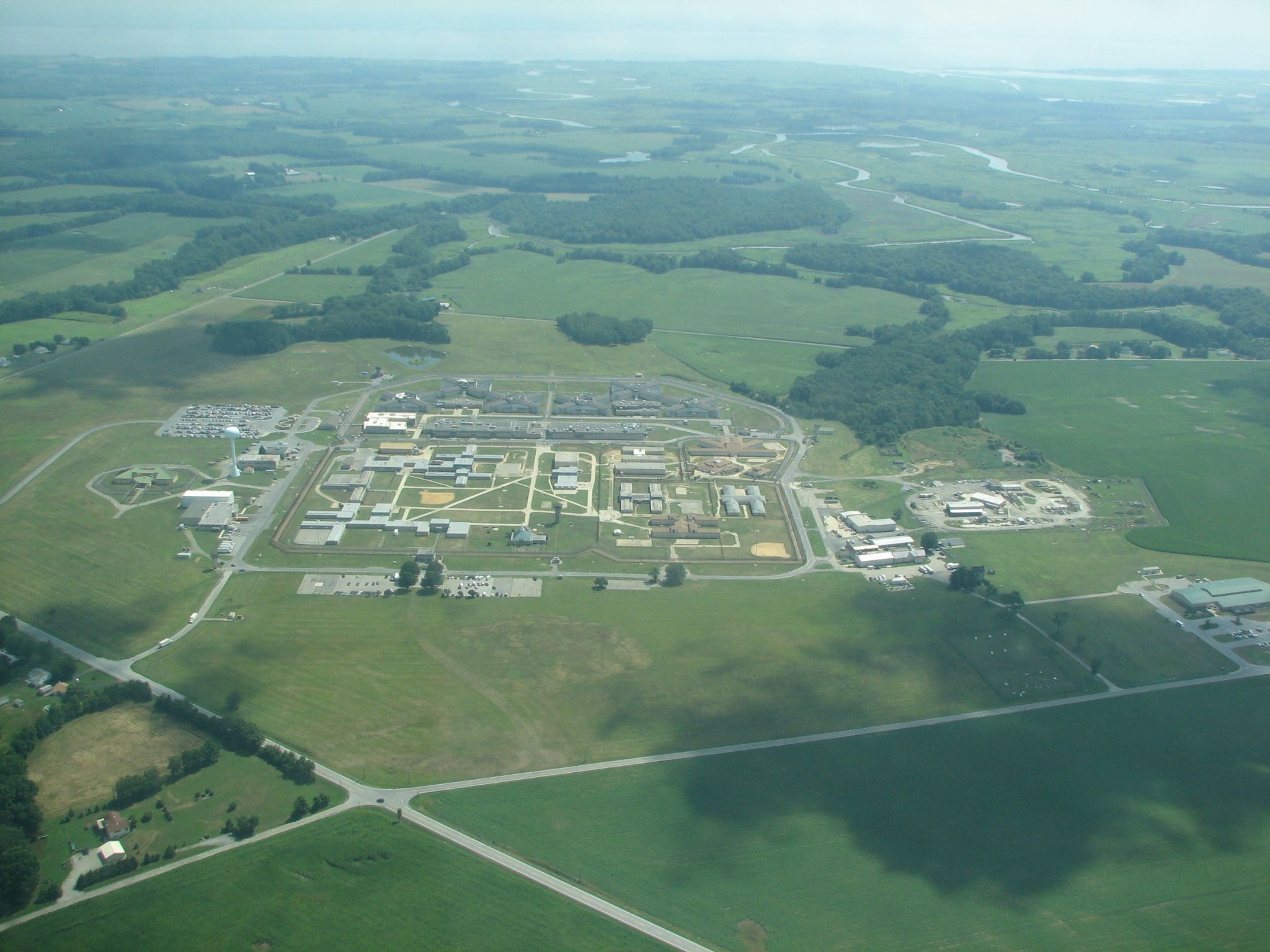
The James T. Vaughn Correctional Center. Welch was nearing the end of a 29-year sentence for child molestation at the time of his first interview with investigators.

Having learned that Welch (b. December 30, 1956) had accrued an extensive criminal history between 1973 and 1997 for offenses including rape, domestic violence, and assault with a knife and was serving a 29-year sentence within the James T. Vaughn Correctional Center for the molestation of a 10-year-old girl in Delaware, detectives secured a prison interview with Welch. This interview was conducted on October 16, 2013, and lasted eight hours.

=== Initial interview with Lloyd Lee Welch Jr. ===
Initially, investigators feared Welch would refuse to speak with them; however, on the first day of formal interview, Welch spoke for many hours – beginning his conversation with the statement: "I know why you're here; you're here about those two missing kids." In response, Detective David Davis placed a photograph of the Lyon sisters before Welch, stating: "These two little girls here have never been found, and their parents are damn near eighty years old and have no idea what happened to their daughters; that's why we're here to talk to you."

In this initial interview, Welch acknowledged observing the sisters near the shopping center on the date of their disappearance, although he denied being present within the premises; he then expanded his admission to claim to have seen "a guy putting two girls in the back of a car. It didn't look right ... one of 'em was crying." Shown a photograph of a known child sex trafficker named Raymond Mileski Sr., whom investigators had previously considered a strong suspect, Welch insisted he was the individual he had seen abducting the Lyon sisters. Asked his personal opinion as to what fate he believed had befallen the girls, Welch replied: "My opinion is that [Mileski] killed 'em and raped 'em ... he probably burned 'em. I don't know."

=== Second interview ===
In his second interview with investigators, Welch acknowledged observing the girls leave the shopping center. He further elaborated he had known Mileski, and that the children had been taken to Mileski's home, where they had been "drugged up", molested, and murdered by Mileski and two other individuals he claimed in this second interview not to know. Welch claimed that he had observed these events through the window of a basement door and that upon hearing one of the children scream, he had fled from the premises.

==== Raymond Mileski Sr. ====
Raymond Rudolph Mileski Sr. (b. 1936), a resident of Suitland, Maryland, at the time of the sisters' disappearance, lived approximately 17 km from the Lyon family in 1975. Mileski had been convicted of the November 1977 shooting deaths of his 35-year-old wife, Delores, and 17-year-old son, Raymond Jr. in addition to wounding his youngest son following a heated domestic argument. He was convicted and sentenced to forty years in prison for these offenses.

Contemporary eyewitness accounts of the individual with the tape recorder in the Wheaton Plaza shopping center, considered a likely suspect in the Lyon sisters' abduction, indicated the man walked with a slight limp – as had Mileski. Furthermore, Mileski closely resembled the composite drawing. This information, coupled with Mileski's known history of child sexual abuse, had previously made him a strong contemporary suspect. Based on information later given to authorities by prison informants and Mileski's own subsequent claims to hold knowledge regarding the sisters' abduction, which he offered to share with investigators in exchange for more favorable prison conditions, authorities searched his former residence in early April 1982, although no evidence was discovered. Mileski died in prison in 2010.

== Subsequent interviews ==
In subsequent interviews with investigators, Welch denied Mileski's culpability in the sisters' abduction and murder; he also contradicted several other claims given in his initial interrogation in the twelve subsequent interviews granted to investigators – alternating between instances of denial of involvement in the sisters' kidnapping and murder, knowledge of relatives' culpability in the crime while maintaining his own innocence, and limiting his participation to the planning and commission of the kidnapping.

Welch's constantly changing accounts as to whom he had seen abducting and/or molesting the sisters; his alternating accounts regarding his participation (or lack thereof); his failing of a polygraph test in one of the first interviews granted to investigators; and the fact his alternating accounts and admissions resulted either from his claims being disproven or challenged led to investigators rapidly viewing Welch as a participant in the crime as opposed to a witness. Furthermore, Welch also inadvertently revealed details about the crime gradually proven to be known only to a direct participant.

March 25 will mark thirty-nine years since Kate and Sheila were taken from our family. The fact that so many people still care about this case means a great deal to us. Throughout these years, our hopes for a resolution of this mystery have been sustained by the support and efforts of countless members of law enforcement, the news media, and the community ... The fact that so many people still care about this case means a great deal to us.

— Statement released to the media by the parents and siblings of Katherine and Sheila Lyon following Montgomery County Sheriff's Office formally announcing Lloyd Lee Welch as a person of interest in the Lyon sisters' disappearance. February 11, 2014.

=== Person of interest ===
In February 2014, investigators formally named Lloyd Lee Welch as a person of interest in the case. Investigators revealed Welch, who was eighteen years old in 1975, was an Appalachian native with a violent temper whose family lived insular lifestyles and frequently engaged in incest – both consensual and non-consensual. Welch himself had been raised in both foster care and, later, by his father after his mother had been killed in a drunk driving crash caused by his own father, whom he claimed had repeatedly molested him as a child.

Between the mid-1970s and the early 1990s, Welch had traveled extensively throughout the United States via his employment as a ride operator for a carnival company which had frequently installed rides and booths close to shopping malls. Investigators also revealed that, although physically attracted to adult females, Welch had a sexual penchant for adolescent female children, and that he had been arrested and convicted of the rape of underage girls in three states in the years following the Lyon sisters' disappearance.

== Revised statements ==
By July 2014, Welch – who had largely remained consistent in his accounts to investigators the Lyon sisters had been "abducted, raped and burned up" – had revised his statement to concede that the day after the sisters' disappearance, he had observed his father, Lloyd Welch Sr. and his uncle, Richard Allen Welch, sexually abuse one of the girls inside a concrete basement. Initially, Welch claimed the basement had been at his uncle's residence, although he later confessed the basement had been at his father's residence in Hyattsville, Maryland. This basement was accessible solely via a single padlocked door at the rear of the property and according to Welch, his father and uncle had threatened him, prompting him to simply leave the children at their mercy at this location. Welch further stated he had never again seen the children alive and also claimed that, upon learning of the sisters' murders, he had been forced to participate in destroying all evidence of the crime at the property.

By July 2014, Welch had confessed the body of at least one of the Lyon sisters had been transported from Maryland to be disposed of upon Taylor's Mountain, Thaxton, Virginia.

According to Welch, the remains of at least one of the sisters had been placed inside a large duffel bag at this residence, and he had buried the body of the girl (or girls) upon family-owned land on Taylor's Mountain in Thaxton, Bedford County, Virginia.

=== Search of Hyattsville residence ===
In September 2014, investigators searched both Taylor's Mountain and Welch's uncle's residence in Hyattsville in response to the claims Welch had made two months previous to having witnessed his father and uncle rape one of the sisters and dismember the other in the basement of the property. The layout of rooms of interest perfectly matched that described by Welch in his latter accounts of the fate befallen to the children, and several items were seized in the search of the property.

=== Search of Taylor's Mountain ===
The FBI's evidence recovery team assisted police and investigators in their September 2014 forensic search of Taylor's Mountain. The sole physical evidence recovered consisted of several small degraded bone fragments of human origin, a single human tooth, a section of charred wire (potentially originating from Sheila's wire-rimmed glasses), and remnants of a beaded necklace or bracelet similar to one habitually worn by Katherine – all recovered from the precise location of the 1975 fire neighbors of the Welch family recollected.

The sections of bone fragments recovered were too degraded to permit any form of DNA analysis; the recovered tooth was lost before analysis could be conducted.

== Further eyewitness accounts ==
In December 2014, Welch's cousin, Henry Parker, informed detectives that he had met Welch at a family property on Taylor's Mountain Road in Thaxton, Virginia, sometime in the spring of 1975. According to Parker, he had helped remove two army-style duffel bags from Welch's vehicle; each covered in red stains, weighing "about 60 or 70 pounds and [smelling] like death". Without questioning Welch as to their contents, Parker threw the bags into a fire which had burned for several days and which neighbors would later recollect had emanated an odor "like you burnt yourself". None of these neighbors had suspected any form of foul play or criminal activity surrounding the fire as the act of residents "burning trash" at this location was commonplace.

Sections of Parker's account had earlier been corroborated by Parker's sister, Connie Akers, who informed investigators that at one point in 1975, she – then a teenager – witnessed Welch and his pregnant partner, Helen Craver, arriving at this property with a bulging "army green duffel bag" emanating a pungent odor he had claimed sourced from spoiled beef. Akers also stated she had been asked by Welch to assist in washing two bags of bloodstained clothing but she had refused.

=== Forensic corroboration ===
Although luminol testing upon the floors and outer walls of the household basement of Welch's uncle had proved negative, a similar May 2015 forensic examination of the rear room of the basement of his father's home revealed extensive traces of blood from the concrete floor to the ceiling, indicating a human, humans or an animal had at one point been slaughtered in this location. Further DNA testing revealed the bloodstains to be of human origin, although the samples were in such an advanced state of degradation no possible genealogical analysis tests could be conducted. These developments proved sufficient to charge Welch with the murders. Shortly thereafter, investigators also named Richard Allen Welch as a person of interest in their ongoing investigation. (Note: Welch's father had died in 1998.)

== Indictment of Lloyd Welch ==
Within months of the search of Welch's father's residence, the forensic corroboration of his revised accounts, and his being confronted with family testimony of the bonfire upon Taylor's Mountain, Welch revised his statements to detail an account of the sisters' abduction, abuse and murder which investigators were able to corroborate in part, although he continued to deny culpability for their actual murder. These accounts were given to investigators in January, February, and May 2015, with his final claim to investigators being that the actual motive for the girls' abduction was for his uncle to force them to participate in a child pornography movie. Furthermore, his father had been a willing participant in the commission of the crime, and he had simply been the "sucker to [abduct] 'em".

In July 2015, Welch was indicted on two first-degree murder charges for his alleged involvement in the deaths of the Lyon sisters, whom he by this stage admitted to having abducted in order that both he and his uncle could sexually abuse them in the basement of his uncle's home. At a press conference held to announce this development, Bedford County Sheriff Michael Brown informed reporters the Lyon sisters had been sexually abused, then "killed in order for their captors to escape detection."

Although investigators publicly stated that members of Welch's family were considered persons of interest, Lloyd Welch was the sole individual to be indicted with regard to the girls' abduction, abuse, and murder due to other alleged participants in the crime being deceased or insufficient evidence existing to charge them with the crime.

By the time of Welch's indictment, cold case investigators had devoted over 16,000 hours to the re-investigation of the sisters' disappearance, had issued over fifty search warrants, and had conducted over one hundred formal interviews with family members, eyewitnesses, and other persons of interest.

=== Conviction ===
Via a plea bargain in which he admitted to participating in the girls' abduction, but not to their sexual assault and murder, Welch pleaded guilty to two counts of first-degree murder on September 12, 2017. He was held accountable for the children's deaths at this hearing because although he denied killing the girls, the sisters died in the commission of abductions with "the intent to defile".

Welch was prosecuted in Bedford County (approximately 320 km southwest of Washington) because authorities believe the children's bodies are most likely buried in this location. Via a prior agreement with the Lyon family, the prosecution had agreed not to seek the death penalty in return for Welch's guilty plea on the understanding that this plea would spare the family years of litigated pleas against the sentence. The sisters' parents – both 77-years-old – and their brothers were all present at this hearing.

Beyond speaking to enter his plea of guilty, Welch refused to speak throughout these hearings. This refusal included an offer by Judge James Updike Jr. to formally address the Lyon family. He received two concurrent 48-year sentences in relation to two counts of first-degree murder; he also received a concurrent 12-year sentence relating to two unrelated sexual assaults committed against children in Northern Virginia. As per statutory requirements, upon Welch's completion of his prison term in Delaware in 2026, he will be transferred to Virginia to begin serving his formal sentence for his convictions in this state.

As the sisters' abduction and murder was committed in 1975, prior to the passing of truth-in-sentencing laws, a possibility exists that Welch may become eligible for parole by the time he reaches his mid-80s; however, officials have publicly stated the chances of Welch being granted parole are slim to none.

I think that there were more people involved in this than (just) Lloyd; I know that there was a conspiracy in my family to cover [the crime] up ... and that idiot couldn't have done it on his own.

— Thomas Welch, cousin of Lloyd Lee Welch, speaking in 2020 of his conviction as to other perpetrators' guilt in the Lyon sisters' murder

== Aftermath ==
The ultimate location of the bodies of Katherine and Sheila Lyon remains unknown. Had Welch been brought to trial without the girls' bodies entered into evidence, the case would have been the longest to have elapsed, with regards to time, between the commission of murder and a trial in which a defendant was convicted in the absence of a body in American history.

Referencing investigators' determination to uncover the truth regarding the Lyon sisters' disappearance and their success in securing the conviction of one of the perpetrators after forty-two years, an executive within the National Center for Missing & Exploited Children, Robert Lowery, stated in 2017: "I think what [the investigators] did was unprecedented", adding that although Welch did not plead guilty to the full extent of his involvement, investigators had achieved a measure of justice. This sentiment was echoed by prosecutor Wes Nance, who stated following Welch's conviction: "In my heart of hearts, I know that we put one of the main perpetrators away ... Katherine and Shelia Lyon were two beautiful young sisters whose disappearance left a permanent hole in the heart of all who knew them. It was truly an inspiration to work with their strong and enduring family. We are proud to offer some semblance of justice today."

Richard Welch was never charged with his alleged involvement in the sisters' abduction and murder due to a lack of corroborating evidence; his wife, Patricia, was charged with perjury in December 2014 for knowingly providing false information to investigators and encouraging a conspiracy of silence within her family pertaining to the case. Although Lloyd Welch had alleged, and later denied, others had been involved in the crime, his uncle had remained an almost constant individual named in his later allegations.

Following Welch's conviction, John Lyon thanked cold case detectives and law enforcement officers on behalf of his family for never ceasing in their efforts to bring those responsible for his daughters' abduction and murder to justice, stating: "We just want to say, 'Thank you'. It's been a long time."

Welch formally began serving his sentence for the Lyon sisters' murders in January 2025; he was transferred from Delaware to the Virginia Department of Corrections on January 7.

== Media ==
=== Bibliography ===
- Bowden, Mark (2019). The Last Stone. New York City: Grove Atlantic. ISBN 978-0-802-14731-8.
- Bowden, Mark (2020). The Last Stone: A Masterpiece of Criminal Interrogation. New York City: Atlantic Monthly Press. ISBN 978-0-802-14891-9.

=== Television ===
- The documentary Who Killed the Lyon Sisters? is directly based upon the disappearance of Katherine and Sheila Lyon, the investigation to identity the person(s) responsible for their abduction and efforts to locate their remains. Directed by Aaron Bowden (the son of journalist and writer Mark Bowden) and broadcast upon Investigation Discovery, this documentary was released in November 2020 and received several awards at the 2021 annual Telly Awards, including Best Documentary.

== See also ==
- Child abduction
- Cold case
- Crime in Maryland
- List of kidnappings
- List of people who disappeared mysteriously (1910–1970)
- National Center for Missing & Exploited Children
- List of murder convictions without a body
- List of solved missing person cases (1970s)
- The Doe Network

== Cited works and further reading ==
- Branson, Jack; Branson, Mary (2011). Delayed Justice: Inside Stories from America's Best Cold Case Investigations. Amherst, New York: Prometheus Books. ISBN 978-1-616-14392-3.
- Collins, James J. (1999). Law Enforcement Policies and Practices Regarding Missing Children and Homeless Youth. United States: Office of Juvenile Justice and Delinquency Prevention. ISBN 978-0-788-18639-4.
- DiBiase, Thomas A. (2014). No-Body Homicide Cases: A Practical Guide to Investigating, Prosecuting, and Winning Cases When the Victim Is Missing. Boca Raton, Florida: Taylor & Francis. ISBN 978-1-482-26006-9.
- Finkelhor, David; Sedlak, Andrea; Hotaling, Gerald T. (1990). Missing, Abducted, Runaway, and Thrownaway Children in America. New York: Officers of Juvenile Justice and Delinquency Prevention. ISBN 0-788-12651-2.
- Fisher, Bonnie S.; Lab, Steven P. (2010). Encyclopedia of Victimology and Crime Prevention. Los Angeles: Sage Publishing. ISBN 978-1-412-96047-2.
- Greene, Dr. Karen Shalev; Alys, Llian (2016). Missing Persons: A Handbook of Research. London: Routledge. ISBN 978-1-409-46802-8.
- Halber, Deborah (2014). The Skeleton Crew: How Amateur Sleuths Are Solving America's Cold Cases. Cambridge: Cambridge University Press. ISBN 978-1-107-04145-5.
- Katz, Hélèna (2010). Cold Cases: Famous Unsolved Mysteries, Crimes, and Disappearances in America. Santa Barbara: Greenwood Publishing Group. ISBN 978-0-313-37692-4.
- Mathis, Michael; Sullivan, Joanna Falcon (2022). Marple's Gretchen Harrington Tragedy: Kidnapping, Murder and Innocence Lost in Suburban Philadelphia. Cheltenham, Gloucestershire: History Press. ISBN 978-1-467-15258-7.
- Pettem, Silvia (2017). The Long Term Missing: Hope and Help for Families. Maryland: Rowman & Littlefield. ISBN 978-1-442-25680-4.
- Stewart, Erin (2021). The Missing Among Us: Stories of Missing Persons and Those Left Behind. New South Wales: NewSouth Publishing. ISBN 978-1-742-23679-7.
- Tedisco, James N.; Paludi, Michele Antionete (1996). Missing Children: A Psychological Approach to Understanding the Causes and Consequences of Stranger and Non-stranger Abduction of Children. New York: State University of New York Press. ISBN 978-0-791-42879-5.
- Wright, E. Lynne (2012). Myths and Mysteries of Florida: True Stories of the Unsolved. Essex, Connecticut: Globe Pequot Press. ISBN 978-0-762-79104-0.
