= The Case Died with Her =

2020 American television special

- Directed by: Skye Borgman
- Starring: Loni Coombs; Joan Morris; Andrea Morris
- Country of origin: United States
- Original language: English

Production
- Producer: Marisa Clifford
- Cinematography: Michael Nelson
- Editors: James Cude; Hans Ole Eicker
- Running time: 88 minutes
- Production companies: BuzzFeed, Pulse Films

Original release
- Network: Oxygen
- Release: December 6, 2020

The Case Died with Her is an American television special that aired December 6, 2020, on Oxygen, directed by Skye Borgman. The program tells the story of Emilie Morris, a former star high school athlete, who was found dead in 2014 at her apartment just after bringing charges against Jim Wilder for inappropriate behavior when she was a minor. Jim Wilder was charged with sex crimes on September 30, 2026.
