= OWN Spotlight: Where Do We Go From Here? =

- Presented by: Oprah Winfrey
- Country of origin: United States
- Original language: English

Production
- Executive producers: Oprah Winfrey; Tara Montgomery
- Producers: Lindsay Flader; Colleen Dunnegan
- Editors: Kirk Garden; Joe Guglielmo; Gil Kraus; Dajana Mitchell; David Torres
- Camera setup: Videotelephony
- Running time: 51 minutes

Original release
- Network: Oprah Winfrey Network
- Release: June 9 – June 10, 2020

OWN Spotlight: Where Do We Go From Here? is a two-part television special moderated by Oprah Winfrey in response to the protests over the murder of George Floyd. It is a discussion show where Winfrey speaks directly about systematic racism, police brutality in the United States, and the current state of America with a variety of African American thought leaders, activists and artists. It was broadcast on June 9 and 10, 2020, on Oprah Winfrey Network (OWN), and aired in simulcast across all Discovery, Inc. cable networks in the United States.

== Guests ==
Name	Occupation
Charles M. Blow	Journalist and op-ed columnist for The New York Times
David Oyelowo	Actor, producer, and film director
Nikole Hannah-Jones	Pulitzer Prize-winning journalist and founder of The 1619 Project
Ava DuVernay	Filmmaker and founder of ARRAY
Jennifer Eberhardt	Stanford University professor and author
Ibram Kendi	Historian and author
Rashad Robinson	Executive director of Color of Change
Keisha Lance Bottoms	Mayor of Atlanta
Stacey Abrams	Politician and author
Bishop William J. Barber II	NAACP national board member and co-chair of Poor People's Campaign: A National Call for a Moral Revival

== Broadcast ==
The special was broadcast on June 9 and 10, 2020, on OWN. It aired in simulcast across all 18 Discovery, Inc. cable networks in the United States, and was streamed on OWN's Facebook, Instagram, and YouTube channels. It was also carried by Discovery's international platforms. This marked the first time an OWN special was simulcast on Discovery's family of networks.

=== Ratings ===
During the special's television simulcast, the debut broadcast of Part 1 received 4.52 million viewers, while the initial airing of Part 2 received 3.73 million viewers. Combined, the special averaged an audience of over 7.3 million. On OWN alone, the two episodes averaged 1.4 million viewers.

The special also received 6.7 million views on Discovery's online platforms, including Facebook and YouTube, with a cumulative total of approximately 17.6 million across all platforms.
