= My Type =

My Type may refer to:

== Music ==
=== EPs ===
- My Type (Lee Seung-hoon EP), featuring the song "My Type" (2024)
- My Type, by Enormous, with a song titled "My Type" (1998)
- My Type, by Kalie Shorr (2025)
- My Type, by Sprite (2024)

=== Songs ===
- "My Type" (Saint Motel song), from the EP My Type (2014)
- "My Type" (Saweetie song), 2019, from the EP Icy
- "My Type" (featuring Emily Warren), by the Chainsmokers from Memories...Do Not Open (2017)
- "My Type", by the Cosmic Girls (WJSN) from the EP For the Summer (2019)
- "My Type", by iKon from Welcome Back (2015)
- "My Type", by Miyu Takeuchi (2019)
- "My Type", by Jessi and Cheetah featuring Kangnam, from the first Unpretty Rapstar compilation album (2015)
- "My Type", by the Consumers from Autopsy (45 Grave album) (1987)
- "My Type", by T.I. from T.I. vs. T.I.P.(2007)
- "My Type", by Tanya Stephens (1998)
- "My Type", composed by Kosine, on Star: Original Soundtrack from Season 3 (2018)
- "My Type", by Five O'Clock Shadow from Originals (By Other People) (2016)
- "My Type", by Firdhaus Farmizi from In & Out (2020)
- "My Type" / "Yea Yea Yea", by Sudan Archives from The BPM (2025)
- "My Type", by Kim Si-hyuk and Kim Beom-ju with lyrics by Cheeze from part 2 of the soundtrack to Spirit Fingers (TV series) (2025)
- "My Type", by Young Slee featuring Teairra Marí, from album First Impression (2013)
- "My Type", by Popcaan (2018)
- "My Type", by Stella Standingbear

== Other uses ==
- "My Type" (Japanese: あたしのタイプ), in vol. 3 of manga Now That We Draw by Kyu Takahata and Yuwji Kaba, 2025
- My Type, a short film by Daniela Ruah, presented at the 41st Santa Barbara International Film Festival (2026)

== See also ==
- Just My Type (disambiguation)
- Not My Type, a 2014 French-Belgian romance film
- "BAD! Mummy Men Aren't My Type!" (Japanese: Bad! ミイラ男は趣味じゃない!), S1 E2 of Slayers, 1995
- She's My Type, a French horse that won the 2020 Coronation Cup Stakes

=== Literature (partial title matches) ===
- Are You My Type, Am I Yours?, a 1995 book by Renee Baron and Elizabeth Wagele about Enneagram Personality types
- "My Type and Your Type" (Japanese: 二人とタイプ), chapter 14 (in vol. 2) of Crossplay Love: Otaku x Punk, 2019
- "The Fuzzy Matrix of 'My Type' in Intrapsychic Sexual Scripting", a 2001 article by David Knapp Whittier and William Simon (sociologist) about sexual script theory
- "You're My Type" (Japanese: 好みのタイプだ), chapter 259 (in vol. 30) of Baki the Grappler, 1997

=== Music (partial title matches) ===
- "Ain't My Type of Hype", a 1989 single by Full Force
- "Eat Your Heart Out" / "You're My Type", a 1984 single by Xavion from Burnin' Hot
- FMT (song), short for "Fuck My Type", a 2025 single by Summer Walker from Finally Over It
- "If Jesus Saves, She's My Type", a 2022 single from Rx (Role Model album)
- "Ito Okashi My Type" (Japanese: いとをかしMyType), on 2024 EP Bucchigiri Tokyo by Hanabie
- "You're My Type of Pleasure", a 2024 single by Kevin Abstract
- "You're My Type of Woman", on XTC (album) by Anthony Hamilton, intended for 1996 release
