= Just My Type =

Just My Type may refer to:

- Just My Type (book), a book about typography by Simon Garfield
- Just My Type (song), a 2018 song by The Vamps
- "Just My Type", a 2024 single from Death or Glory by Palaye Royale, mixed by Mark Needham, with a music video directed by Mod Sun
- "Just My Type", a song from 2020 EP Live for Now by Jeremy Renner
- "Just My Type", a 2020 single by Prince Taee featuring YK Osiris
- "Just My Type", a 2015 song by Spadez feat. Jessica Ashley, from The Produce Section
- "Just My Type" (Chinese: 我愛的那種), on 2016 album What Love Has Taught Us by Eric Chou
- "Just My Type", a 2018 single by Tiana Kocher, with a music video directed by Ali Zamani, starring Marlon Wayans, Rob Schneider, and Brely Evans, and nominated for the Independent Music Video category of the 9th Hollywood Music in Media Awards
- "Just My Type", a song featuring Poppy, on We Bare Bears (Original Television Soundtrack), 2020
- Just My Type (film), a Hallmark Channel television movie, aired 2020 March 28 for Spring Fling, in which Brett Dalton played Martin Clayborne, Michele Scarabelli played Dottie Chambers, and Bethany Joy Lenz played Vanessa Sills — see also List of 2020 American television films and specials and List of Hallmark Channel Original Movies (2020s)
- Just My Type (TV series), 2021, in which Jaiden Kaine played Alex and was a writer
- "Just My Type", S3 E4 of Stolen Voices, Buried Secrets, a 2011–2012 American television series
- "Just My Type", a game round in S3 E2 "A Red Mist of Vowels and Consonants!" (2026) of Guy Montgomery's Guy Mont-Spelling Bee (Australian TV series)

== See also ==
- "She's Just My Type", on 2010 album Killer Grass by Hayseed Dixie
- "You're Just My Type", a 1930 song composed by King Oliver and his nephew Dave Nelson, covered by Vince Giordano and the Nighthawks for 2001 film Ghost World
- "You're Just My Type", a 1940 song composed by Henry Foner
- My Type (disambiguation)
- Just My Luck (disambiguation)
