= Just My Luck =

Just My Luck may refer to:

== Film and television ==
- Just My Luck (1933 film), a British comedy starring Robertson Hare
- Just My Luck (1936 film), a comedy starring Charles Ray
- Just My Luck (1957 film), a British sports comedy starring Norman Wisdom
- Just My Luck (2006 film), an American romantic comedy starring Lindsay Lohan and Chris Pine
- Just My Luck, a 1984 short film by Janet Greek
- "Just My Luck" (My Parents Are Aliens), an episode of My Parents Are Aliens
- "Just My Luck" (Ewoks), an episode of Star Wars: Ewoks

== Literature ==
- Just My Luck (manga), a yaoi manga by Temari Matsumoto
- Just My Luck: Memoirs of a Police Officer of the Raj, a 2000 autobiography by P. E. S. Finney
- "Just My Luck", a poem by Doren Robbins

== Music ==
- "Just My Luck", a song by Alyson Williams
- "Just My Luck", a song by The Deele from Street Beat
- "Just My Luck", a song by Five.Bolt.Main from Live
- "Just My Luck", a song by John Scofield from Electric Outlet
- "Just My Luck", a song by Kim Richey
- "Just My Luck", a song by McFly from the soundtrack of the 2006 film Just My Luck
- "Just My Luck", a song by Mental As Anything
- "Just My Luck", a song from the musical The Body Beautiful

== See also ==
- "It's Just My Luck", a song by Connie Smith from Connie Smith
- "It's Just My Luck", a song by Voices in Public
- Just Your Luck, a 1972 British television drama
