= List of Baki the Grappler chapters =

First tankōbon volume of Baki the Grappler, published by Akita Shoten

Written and illustrated by Keisuke Itagaki, Baki the Grappler was serialized in Weekly Shōnen Champion magazine from September 30, 1991, to 1999, with the chapters collected into 42 tankōbon volumes by its publisher Akita Shoten. It was republished into 15 wide-ban volumes, divided by story arc, from 2003 to 2004 and into 24 kanzenban volumes between 2007 and 2008. It was licensed for a North American release by Gutsoon! Entertainment. They published the first 46 chapters in their English-language manga anthology magazine Raijin Comics. The magazine's first issue was released on December 18, 2002, but in July 2004 it was discontinued. Four collected volumes were planned but it is unknown if they were released. In 2025, Kodama Tales Inc. licensed the series for a worldwide English release, and published the kanzenban edition both physically and digitally between October 2025 and September 2026.

Between June 1, 1999, and November 24, 2005, a sequel simply titled Baki was serialized in Weekly Shōnen Champion and collected into 31 tankōbon volumes. It was republished into 12 wide-ban volumes, divided by arc, beginning in 2006. A kanzenban edition was published in 17 volumes between 2012 and 2013. In 2018, it was collected into an 18-volume shinsōban edition. This series was licensed for English release by Media Do International, who released it digitally from August 2018 to August 2019. In April 2026, Kodama Tales licensed the series for a worldwide English release under the title "New Grappler Baki", and began publishing it in November.

A third series, again serialized in Weekly Shōnen Champion, titled Baki Hanma began on December 1, 2005, and ended on August 16, 2012. It was originally collected into 37 tankōbon volumes, and republished into 5 wide-ban volumes. From 2021 to 2022, it was collected into a 21-volume shinsōban edition. In November 2026, Kodama Tales announced they have licensed the series for an English release and will begin publishing it in July 2027.

Baki-Dou (刃牙道), the fourth series, was serialized in Weekly Shōnen Champion from March 20, 2014, to April 5, 2018, with the chapters collected into 22 tankōbon volumes.

A fifth series, also titled Bakidou (バキ道) but with Baki's name written in katakana instead of kanji, was serialized in Weekly Shōnen Champion from October 4, 2018, to June 15, 2023. The chapters were collected into 17 tankōbon volumes.

Baki Rahen, the sixth series, began serialization in Weekly Shōnen Champion on August 24, 2023.

== Baki the Grappler ==
No.	Release date	ISBN
01	February 21, 1992	978-4-253-05309-9
001. "His Name is Baki!" (ヤツの名は刃牙!!); 002. "The Final Round Begins!" (決勝戦開始!!); 003. "Suedo's Danger Level" (末堂のキケン度); 004. "Beyond A Barred Move!" (反則技を超えて!!); 005. "Hit the Face!" (顔面を打て!!); 006. "Last Rush!" (ラスト･ラッシュ!!); 007. "Shinshinkai Director, Doppo Orochi" (神心会館長･愚地独歩); 008. "Go After Baki!" (刃牙を追え!!)
02	April 20, 1992	978-4-253-05310-5
009. "The Mighty Begin to Stir!" (蠢き出す強者たち!!); 010. "The House Baki Dwells" (刃牙の棲む家); 011. "Keeping a Mad Dog" (凶犬を飼う); 012. "Ask Baki!" (刃牙に訊け!!); 013. "Heavyweight Boxer, Takayama" (ヘヴィ級ボクサー･高山); 014. "Baki, Angry!" (刃牙, 怒る!!); 015. "Clash: Baki vs. Takayama!" (激突,刃牙VS高山!!); 016. "Kato the Nuclear Warhead" (核弾頭･加藤); 017. "To the Sacred Grounds of Battle!" (武闘の聖地へ!!)
03	June 25, 1992	978-4-253-05311-2
018. "The Tokyo Dome's Underground Arena" (東京ドーム地下武闘場!!); 019. "Baki the Champion And the Challenger!" (王者刃牙, そして挑戦者!!); 020. "Sacred Grounds That Decide the Strongest!" (最強を決定る聖地!!); 021. "One Month's Results!" (1か月の成果!!); 022. "The Champion's Right Arm!" (王者の右腕!!); 023. "The Quest for Fingers of Steel!" (鋼鉄の指をもとめて!!); 024. "A Boy's Tears!" (少年の涙!!); 025. "Final Weapon!" (最終兵器!!); 026. "Seize the Decisive Moment!" (とらえろ, 決着の一瞬!!); 027. "Ask the Winner!" (勝者に問う!!)
04	August 7, 1992	978-4-253-05312-9
028. "Undercard Wrestler, Junichi Hanada" (前座レスラー・花田順一); 029. "Take Your Title Shot!" (挑戦権を奪え!!); 030. "The Expelled Man" (破門された男); 031. "A Shadow Sprints!" (影が疾走った!!); 032. "The Giant Descends" (巨人の降臨); 033. "Don Mount Toba" (首領・マウント斗羽); 034. "The Rampaging Giant" (暴乱の巨人); 035. "An Unforgivable Defeat" (許されざる敗北); 036. "Attack the Vitals!" (急所を攻めろ!!)
05	November 16, 1992	978-4-253-05313-6
037. "The Demon's Memory" (鬼の記憶); 038. "Aim for the Extremities" (末端を狙え!!); 039. "Attack the Giant!" (巨人を攻める!!); 040. "Don't Corner Him" (追いつめるな!!); 041. "Fortitude" (不屈); 042. "The Man Who Goes Forward" (前へ出る男); 043. "The Demon, Ogre" (鬼[オーガ]); 044. "Special Match!" (スペシャル・マッチ!!); 045. "Killing Instinct" (殺傷本能)
06	January 8, 1993	978-4-253-05314-3
046. "The Fighters Talk!" (戦士たちは語る!!); 047. "The God of Martial Arts, Doppo Orochi" (武神・愚地独歩); 048. "The Karate!" (ザ・カラテ!!); 049. "Outdoor Bout" (野試合); 050. "Old Scores!" (因縁!!); 051. "A Kid's Fight!" (子供のケンカ!!); 052. "Other Side of the Door!" (扉のむこうに!!); 053. "Tiger!" (虎!!); 054. "Doctor Kureha!" (ドクター紅葉!!)
07	March 26, 1993	978-4-253-05315-0
055. "The Time Has Come!" (時が来た!!); 056. "Clash of Two Icons" (両雄激突!!); 057. "Udonde!" (ウドンデ!!); 058. "The Savage Beasts!" (猛獣たち!!); 059. "Eyes of the God of Martial Arts" (武神の眼); 060. "True Form!" (正体!!); 061. "The Demon's Face" (鬼の形相!!); 062. "The Crying Demon" (哭く鬼!!); 063. "A Superstar Falls!" (巨星, 墜つ!!)
08	May 21, 1993	978-4-253-05316-7
064. "Resuscitation Lecture" (再生のレクチャー(講義)); 065. "Devilish Deeds" (悪魔の技); 066. "Let the Second Main Event Begin!!" (2大決戦･第2試合開戦!!); 067. "Know Intense Pain!!" (激痛を知れ!!); 068. "Getting Serious!!" (本気を出す!!); 069. "Destruction Lecture" (破壊のレクチャー(講義)); 070. "The Doctor and the Demon" (医者と鬼); 071. "Behold, Gotaijutsu!!" (見よ,剛体術!!); 072. "After the Battle...!!" (闘いのあとで…!!)
09	July 16, 1993	978-4-253-05317-4
073. "Meet the Elder" (長老に会う); 074. "Baki Hanma, Age 13!!" (範馬刃牙,13歳!!); 075. "One Hundred vs. One!!" (100対1!!); 076. "The Thirty-Seventh Person" (37人目); 077. "In the Dark Cave!!" (暗き洞穴にて!!); 078. "The Lavish Life of a Dangerous Kid" (やばい小僧の華麗な生活); 079. "Strength Swells at School...!!" (学園に強さ渦巻く…!!); 080. "Let's Throw Down!!" (闘ろうじゃないか!!); 081. "Something Slithers!!" (蠢くものあり!!)
10	September 10, 1993	978-4-253-05318-1
082. "Dweller of the Shadows, Kaoru Hanayama" (闇に棲む者・花山 薫); 083. "Invite to a Duel" (決闘への招待); 084. "Freakish Fist!!" (異形の拳!!); 085. "Kneading a Person!!" (人をこねる!!); 086. "Diabolical Ones!!" (魔性の者ども!!); 087. "Superhuman Boxer, Yuri" (異能剣闘士・ユリー); 088. "Baki, Can't be Stopped!!" (刃牙,もう止まらない!!); 089. "Raindrops?! Wolves?!" (雨つぶか？! オオカミか？!); 090. "Be Frustrated! To Tears!!" (くやしがれ! 泣くほどに!!)
11	December 1, 1993	978-4-253-05319-8
091. "I'll Go It Alone!!" (独りでゆく!!); 092. "Ando the Giant Appers!!" (巨人･安藤登場!!); 093. "The Beast of Yasha Rock" (夜叉岩の魔獣); 094. "Giant Man vs. Giant Ape" (巨人VS巨猿); 095. "Baki Trembling in Fear...!!" (畏怖える刃牙…!!); 096. "I'm Gonna Eat!!" (喰ってやる!!); 097. "Endogenous Opioids, Endorphins" (脳内麻薬エンドルフィン); 098. "Cross That Line!!" (その一線を超えろ…!!); 099. "Ring of Fire" (炎のリング)
12	February 3, 1994	978-4-253-05320-4
100. "Attack the Beast!!" (魔獣を撃て!!); 101. "Wild Combat Power" (野生の戦闘力); 102. "Go Beyond Pain and Fear!!" (痛みと恐怖の向こうに!!); 103. "I'll Beat You!!" (オレが倒す!!); 104. "Off to See the Yasha Ape...!!" (夜叉猿に会いに…!!); 105. "Prelude to the Fight" (闘いへの助走); 106. "The Strongest Heavyweight" (最強のヘヴィ級); 107. "A Grand Back" (雄大い背中); 108. "Yuri vs. Hanayama" (ユリーVS花山)
13	April 22, 1994	978-4-253-05321-1
109. "A Warrior's Heart!!" (戦士の心!!); 110. "I Found You!!" (おまえを見つけた!!); 111. "Provoke!!" (挑発!!); 112. "The Two Pay a Visit" (見舞う2人); 113. "Here He Comes!!" (ヤツが来ている!!); 114. "Eruption" (噴火); 115. "Bloodlust in the Air!!" (殺意あり!!); 116. "Secret of the Tattoo" (刺青の秘密); Special One-shot. "Keshō-shi ―Meika―" (化粧師―メイカ―)
14	June 17, 1994	978-4-253-05322-8
117. "The Claw" (握撃); 118. "Those Chosen by God" (神に選ばれし者たち); 119. "The Power of the Fist" (拳の力); 120. "Not Yet!!" (まだだッ!!); 121. "A Real Man!!!" (真の侠客!!!); 122. "Outcome and Descent" (決着、そして降臨); 123. "The Man Who Made It in Time" (間にあった男); 124. "A Demon" (鬼); 125. "At Akezawa Manor..." (朱沢邸にて―)
15	September 9, 1994	978-4-253-05323-5
126. "The Encounter, Part 1" (出逢い 1); 127. "The Encounter, Part 2" (出逢い 2); 128. "The Encounter, Part 3" (出逢い 3); 129. "Bonds" (絆); 130. "The Trickster" (弄ぶ者); 131. "Challenging Yujiro!!" (勇次郎に挑む!!); 132. "The Strongest Unit" (最強部隊); 133. "War" (戦争); 134. "Unseen Enemies!!" (見えない敵!!)
16	November 18, 1994	978-4-253-05324-2
135. "Super Soldier Gaia" (超軍人ガイア); 136. "The Sharpest Edge" (最高の切れ味); 137. "Strong Style Declaration" (正統派宣言); 138. "Skunk" (スカンク); 139. "This is War" (これは戦争); 140. "Team" (合体); 141. "Gaia Appears" (ガイアが出る); 142. "Split Personalities" (多重人格); 143. "Latent Potential Full Throttle" (潜在能力全開)
17	February 1, 1995	978-4-253-05325-9
144. "I'll Go Full Throttle Too!!" (こっちも全開!!); 145. "A Soul Betrayed" (裏切られた魂); 146. "One-Hundred Pieces of Bloodlust" (100個の殺意); 147. "Set These Two Free...!!" (肉体を自由に…!!); 148. "Just All Out!!" (ただ全力!!); 149. "Atmospheric Lightning" (大気の雷); 150. "The Terror of Water and Grass!!" (水そして草の恐怖!!); 151. "Crossing the Line of Death" (死線を超えて); 152. "If I Were to Die" (もしオレが死んだら)
18	April 27, 1995	978-4-253-05326-6
153. "Supreme Authority vs. Ultimate Violence" (最高権力VS最強暴力); 154. "For Yujiro..." (勇次郎のために…); 155. "Japanese Blade vs. Baki" (日本刀VS刃牙); 156. "The Flying Swallow's Fist vs. Baki" (飛燕の拳VS刃牙); 157. "The Great Bow vs. Yujiro" (豪弓VS勇次郎); 158. "Father and Mother" (父そして母); 159. "Bitemarks" (噛み跡); 160. "Hanayama Returns" (花山再び); 161. "The Day Has Come!!" (その日が来た!!)
19	July 6, 1995	978-4-253-05327-3
162. "Five Against One Warm Up!!" (5対1のウォームアップ!!); 163. "The Brawling of the Superpowered Boxer, Yuri!!" (異能ボクサー･ユリーの喧嘩!!); 164. "Kaoru Hanayama's Fists Roar!!" (花山薫の拳がうなる!!); 165. "The Witnesses!!" (目撃者たち!!); 166. "Ogre Descends!" (オーガ降り立つ!); 167. "It Has Begun!!" (始まった!!); 168. "Baki Attacks!!" (刃牙,攻める!!); 169. "Father-Son Deathmatch! What About the Mother?!" (父と子の死闘!その時,母は!?); 170. "Yujiro All Out!!" (勇次郎の本気!!)
20	September 14, 1995	978-4-253-05355-6
171. "That is Yujiro Hanma" (あれが範馬勇次郎); 172. "She Was My Mother" (母だった); 173. ""Ogre" Takes His Leave" (去りゆく"鬼"); 174. "After Dreaming" (夢を見た後); 175. "Determination" (決意); 176. "Across the Sea" (海を越えて); 177. "Return There!!" (そこへ戻れ!!); 178. "At Tokugawa Manor" (徳川邸にて); 179. "Regular Fighter" (正ファイター); 180. "To the Sacred Grounds of Combat!!" (格闘の聖地へ!!)
21	November 10, 1995	978-4-253-05356-3
181. "To the Underground Arena!!" (地下闘技場へ!!); 182. "Katsumi Orochi" (愚地克巳); 183. "Belt of the Strongest" (最強者のベルト); 184. "The Maximum Tournament!!" (最大トーナメントへ!!); 185. "The Party Has Started!!" (祭りが始まった!!); 186. "Baki vs. The Supergiant" (刃牙VS大巨人); 187. "Dream Chasers!!" (夢を追う者たち!!)
22	February 23, 1996	978-4-253-05357-0
188. "A Warrior's Energy" (闘士のエナジー); 189. "Jujutsu vs. Sumo" (柔術VS大相撲); 190. "A Fearsome Lifeline" (恐るべき命綱); 191. "The Stacked Block B" (激戦区Bブロック); 192. "Man from the Northern Land" (北の国から来た男); 193. "Tenrenge" (転蓮華); 194. "Super A-Class Alternate" (超A級リザーバー); 195. "The Monster Returns" (魔獣再び); 196. "I'll Catch" (受けとめる)
23	April 5, 1996	978-4-253-05358-7
197. "Yasha Ape Jr. vs. Katsumi Orochi" (夜叉猿Jr.VS愚地克巳); 198. "The Giant Sallies Forth!!" (巨人出陣!!); 199. "Traditional Power Unlimited!!" (伝統の力, 無限!!); 200. "The Way of Martial Arts?! Or The Way of Brawling?!" (武道か!?喧嘩道か!?); 201. "He Too is a Warrior" (彼もまた武人なり); 202. "Joint Fetishist" (ジョイント･フェチ); 203. "Clash! Katsumi vs. Istaz" (激突!克巳VSイスタス); 204. "Super Submission vs. Super Karate" (超関節技VS超空手); 205. "Inescapable!!" (脱出不可能!!)
24	June 14, 1996	978-4-253-05359-4
206. "The Warriors!!" (戦士たち!!); 207. "And So Came Orge" (そして"鬼"は来た!!); 208. "He Who is Worthy" (ふさわしき者); 209. "That Man, Yu Amanai" (その男, 天内悠); 210. "A Rare Match! Judo vs. Biker" (異色の一戦!柔道VS暴走族); 211. "Man-to-Man!!" (タイマン!!); 212. "Shorinji Kempo vs. American Pro Wrestling" (少林寺拳法VSアメリカン･プロレス); 213. "Mysterious Man" (不思議な男)
25	August 1, 1996	978-4-253-05360-0
214. "Pitfighter vs. Brazilian Jiu-Jutsu" (ケンカ屋VSブラジリアン柔術); 215. "The Right to Fight Him" (ヤツと闘る権利); 216. "The Man That My Dad Brought" (親父が連れて来た男); 217. "World's Toughest Guy!!" (世界一のタフ･ガイ!!); 218. "Iron Fist Showdown!!" (鉄拳勝負!!); 219. "One-Billion Yen Necklace" (10億円のネックレス); 220. "Master" (達人); 221. "Sibling Showdown 1" (兄弟対決1); 222. "Sibling Showdown 2" (兄弟対決2)
26	October 4, 1996	978-4-253-05361-7
223. "Sibling Showdown 3" (兄弟対決3); 224. "Sibling Showdown 4" (兄弟対決4); 225. "Sibling Showdown 5" (兄弟対決5); 226. "A New Step" (新たなる一歩); 227. "Eat, Sleep, and Breathe Combat" (行住坐臥すべて闘い); 228. "One-One" (一対一); 229. "Performance" (パフォーマンス)
27	December 6, 1996	978-4-253-05362-4
230. "Highest Rank in Sumo" (大相撲の最高位); 231. "Sumo Showdown!!" (相撲対決!!); 232. "Sumo Ring" (土俵); 233. "The Sumo Showdown Concludes!!" (相撲対決決着!!); 234. "The Reason for the Towel" (タオルの理由); 235. "The Man Who Inherits the Name of Kaio" (海王の名を継ぐ男); 236. "One Minute Match!!!" (1分勝負!!); 237. "Two Prodigies" (天才二人); 238. "The "Strongest" Brawler" ("最強"の喧嘩師!!)
28	February 7, 1997	978-4-253-05601-4
239. "Punch" (パンチ); 240. "Ten Count" (10カウント); 241. "Monster!!" (化物!!); 242. "Cocky" (思いあがり); 243. "I Can Be Stronger!!" (強くなれる!); 244. "The Move Dedicated to Kaoru Hanayama" (花山薫へ捧げる技); 245. "The Standing Man" (侠客立ち); 246. "What the Battle Wrought" (闘いが生んだもの); 247. "He Ain't No Joke!!" (ハンパじゃねェ!!)
29	April 18, 1997	978-4-253-05602-1
248. "Fighting Kid" (けんか小僧); 249. "Even Ground" (互角); 250. "Heavyweight Boxing Champion" (ボクシングヘヴィ級チャンピオン); 251. "I Can Pull This Off!!" (これならイケル!!); 252. "Bare Hands" (素手); 253. "Punk Championship Match!!" (ツッパリチャンピオン決定戦!!); 254. "The Rarest Match Concludes!!" (最大の異色対決決着!!); 255. "Russia's Strongest Warrior!!" (ロシア最強の戦士!!)
30	June 12, 1997	978-4-253-05603-8
256. "Crater" (クレーター); 257. "Patriotism" (愛国心); 258. "Latent Potential" (潜在能力); 259. "You're My Type" (好みのタイプだ); 260. "Mysterious Bleeding!!" (謎の出血!!); 261. "An Unprecedented Special Move!!" (前代未聞の必殺技!!); 262. "The Showdown Between Right and Wrong Concludes!!" (正邪対決決着!!); 263. "Monsters" (怪物たち); 264. "It's Finally Complete!" (完成したんだよ!)
31	August 1, 1997	978-4-253-05604-5
265. "Certified Martial Arts Warrior" (極めつけの武道家); 266. "Mother and Fighting" (母,そして闘い); 267. "Mother and Father" (父と母); 268. "Friendship and Combat!!" (友好と闘争!!); 269. "The Terror of Budo Karate!!" (武道空手の怖さ!!); 270. "The Nature of Yu Amanai!!" (天内悠の資質!!); 271. "Please Acknowledge It!!" (認めて下さい!!); 272. "Idea of Combat" (闘争の思想); 273. "The Nine People!!" (9人!!)
32	October 9, 1997	978-4-253-05605-2
274. "Hunting Prey" (戦士狩り); 275. "The Winners" (勝利者たち); 276. "The Ogre's Groan" (オーガの呻き); 277. "Second Round, Finale!!" (2回戦,最終試合!!); 278. "The Master's Move!!" (達人の技!!); 279. "A Move I Can't Use on My Brother!!" (兄弟には使用えぬ技!!); 280. "Strongest Lineup on Earth!!" (地上最強揃い踏み!!); 281. "The Other Kanji Igari!!" (もう1つの猪狩完至!!); 282. "Camouflage!!" (擬態!!)
33	December 5, 1997	978-4-253-05606-9
283. "The Real Kanji Igari!!" (ホンモノの猪狩完至!!); 284. "Martial Artist and Pro Wrestler" (格闘家とプロレスラー); 285. "Kanji Igari's Secret Plan!!" (猪狩完至の秘策!!); 286. "Mom...?!" (……お袋…!?); 287. "I Want to Thank You From the Bottom of My Heart!!" (心から感謝したい!!); 288. "Pro Wrestling Showdown!!" (プロレス勝負!!); 289. "The Greatest Kanji Igari!!" (最高の猪狩完至!!); 290. "Thank You" (アリガトウ); 291. "Dagan" (打岩); 292. "Prodigy Boy!!" (天才少年!!)
34	February 27, 1998	978-4-253-05607-6
293. "The History of Karate" (空手の歴史); 294. "Modern Karate vs. Chinese Kenpo!!" (近代空手VS中国拳法!!); 295. "Where You Stand!!" (居る場所!!); 296. "Special Match!!" (スペシャル･マッチ!!); 297. "Monster Showdown 1" (怪物対決1); 298. "Monster Showdown 2" (怪物対決2); 299. "Monster Showdown 3" (怪物対決3); 300. "Monster Showdown 4" (怪物対決4)
35	May 29, 1998	978-4-253-05608-3
301. "Monster Showdown 5" (怪物対決5); 302. "Monster Showdown 6" (怪物対決6); 303. "Monster Showdown 7" (怪物対決7); 304. "Monster Showdown 8" (怪物対決8); 305. "Past Everything...!!" (全てを超えて…!!); 306. "A Real Seiken!!" (本当の正拳!!); 307. "Aiki!!!" (合気!!!); 308. "Orochi Flies!!" (愚地,舞う!!); 309. "Perfect" (完璧)
36	July 10, 1998	978-4-253-05609-0
310. "Kagome Kagome" (かごめかごめ); 311. "I Just Can't Picture It, Sir" (想像できないんですよ); 312. "Don't Look Down On Me!!" (舐めんじゃねェ!!); 313. "Doppo vs. Shibukawa Concludes!!" (独歩VS渋川決着!!); 314. "Experience in Age" (年季); 315. "Door!!" (扉!!); 316. "The Evil Demon Stirs" (悪鬼胎動); 317. "Blood!!" (血!!); 318. "I Won This!!" ("勝った"のは俺だ!!)
37	September 18, 1998	978-4-253-05610-6
319. "In Just 4,000 Years" (4000年ぐらいじゃ); 320. "Tradition!!" (伝統!!); 321. "Chinese Kempo vs. Pankration" (中国拳法VSパンクラチオン!!); 322. "The Devil Fist, Kaio Retsu!!" (魔拳･烈海王!!); 323. "Foot Fist!!" (足拳!!); 324. "Preconceptions!!" (思い込み!!); 325. "Shadow Fight!!" (シャドー!!); 326. "No Handicap!!!" (ハンデなし!!!); 327. "Awaken!!" (目覚め!!)
38	December 4, 1998	978-4-253-05611-3
328. "The Echoes of Ruin" (破滅の響き); 329. "4,000 Years of Chinese History Falls!!" (中国4000年,堕つ); 330. "True Self-Defense!!" (真の護身!!); 331. "Demonstration!!" (デモンストレーション!!); 332. "Water Gun!!" (水鉄砲!!); 333. "The Greatest Bow" (最上級の一礼); 334. "Bite! Bite! Bite!" (噛みつき!噛みつき!噛みつき!); 335. "Toyama no Kin-san" (遠山の金さん); 336. "Monster vs. Master Concludes!!" (怪物VS達人決着!!)
39	February 26, 1999	978-4-253-05612-0
337. "Strength and Decay" (強さと崩壊); 338. "Natural vs. Unnatural" (ナチュラルVSアンナチュラル); 339. "Today vs. Today" (今日対今日); 340. "The Best Fight!!" (最高の喧嘩!!); 341. "Two Dumbasses!!" (バカヤロウ2人!!); 342. "Brothers?!" (兄弟!?); 343. "Spray of the Deathmatch" (死闘のしぶき); 344. "Evenly Matched!!" (互角!!); 345. "Bipedal Lion!!" (二本足の獅子!!)
40	April 16, 1999	978-4-253-05613-7
346. "Both Father and Brother..." (父も兄も……); 347. "Secret War in Vietnam (1)" (シークレットウォー･イン･ベトナム(1)); 348. "Secret War in Vietnam (2)" (シークレットウォー･イン･ベトナム(2)); 349. "Secret War in Vietnam (3)" (シークレットウォー･イン･ベトナム(3)); 350. "Secret War in Vietnam (4)" (シークレットウォー･イン･ベトナム(4)); 351. "Secret War in Vietnam (5)" (シークレットウォー･イン･ベトナム(5)); 352. "Secret War in Vietnam (6)" (シークレットウォー･イン･ベトナム(6)); 353. "Secret War in Vietnam (7)" (シークレットウォー･イン･ベトナム(7)); 354. "Secret War in Vietnam (8)" (シークレットウォー･イン･ベトナム(8))
41	July 22, 1999	978-4-253-05614-4
355. "Secret War in Vietnam (9)" (シークレットウォー･イン･ベトナム(9)); 356. "For Whom Do I Fight?" (誰がためにオレは闘う); 357. "Purely" (純粋に); 358. "Lion Dance" (獅子舞); 359. "That's How He's Always Been!!" (いつもそうだった!!); 360. "The Two Biggest Idiots!!" (大馬鹿2人!!); 361. "Surplus of Special Techniques" (絶技繚乱); 362. "Evolving Prodigy" (進化する天才); 363. "Maxing Out" (マックシング)
42	September 16, 1999	978-4-253-05615-1
364. "Divine Punishment" (神罰); 365. "The Greatest and Most Evil Devil" (最高にして最凶の悪魔); 366. "Last Minute!!" (ラスト1分!!); 367. "The Maximum Tournament Concludes!!" (最大トーナメント決着!!); 368. "A Champion Is Born!!" (チャンピオン誕生!!); 369. "Thank You, Everyone!!" (みんなアリガトウ!!); 370. "One More Final!!" (もう一つの決勝!!); 371. "I Want to Fight!!" (闘いたい!!)

== Baki ==
No.	Original release date	Original ISBN	English release date	English ISBN
01	January 13, 2000	978-4-253-05617-5	August 14, 2018 (digital)	—
001. "Synchronicity" (シンクロニシティ); 002. "America - Dorian" (アメリカ･ドリアン); 003. "Great Britain - Doyle" (イギリス･ドイル); 004. "Russia - Sikorsky" (ロシア･コルスキー); 005. "America - Spec" (アメリカ･スペック); 006. "Japan - Ryukoh Yanagi" (日本･柳･龍光); 007. "Dark Martial Arts" (黒格闘技)
02	April 13, 2000	978-4-253-05618-2	August 14, 2018 (digital)	—
008. "Show Your Face" (面ァ貸せ!); 009. "Monster" (化物); 010. "Handshake" (握手); 011. "Similarities" (似ている); 012. "Underestimate" (甘い); 013. "Steamed Meat Buns" (中華まんじゅう); 014. "Modern Karate" (近代空手); 015. "Laying Waste to the Dojo" (道場荒らし); 016. "Retsu vs. Dorian" (烈VSドリアン)
03	June 8, 2000	978-4-253-05619-9	August 14, 2018 (digital)	—
017. "Fitness Test" (体力測定); 018. "World Record" (世界記録); 019. "Ready...Go!" (ヨーイドン); 020. "Good Feeling" (予感); 021. "They're Finally Here!!" (来た!来た!!来た!!!); 022. "The Rules" (ルール); 023. "Let the Games Began" (開始!!); 024. "Reclaiming Honor" (名誉挽回!!); 025. "Karate vs. Science" (空手VS科学!!)
04	August 10, 2000	978-4-253-05620-5	September 25, 2018 (digital)	—
026. "Faker" (タヌキ); 027. "Wolf in Sheep's Clothing" (化けの皮); 028. "Date" (デート); 029. "A Second Time" (2度目の…!!); 030. "Beautiful!" (ビューティフル); 031. "Pride" (自負心); 032. "Destroyer of Gods" (破神); 033. "Breathless Barrage" (無呼吸連打); 034. "Patronization" (子供扱い)
05	October 12, 2000	978-4-253-05621-2	October 16, 2018 (digital)	—
035. "Want Some More?" (まだやるかい); 036. "Fireworks" (花火); 037. "Topple" (ゴロン); 038. "Breaking Bricks" (試し割り); 039. "Kaoru Hanayama vs. Speck... The Final Showdown" (花山薫VSスペック決着!!); 040. "Human Intellect" (人間の英知); 041. "Strife" (受難); 042. "The Wind God's Sickle" (風神鎌); 043. "Molar" (奥歯)
06	December 21, 2000	978-4-253-05622-9	November 20, 2018 (digital)	—
044. "All Above Board" (卑怯); 045. "A Formidable Team" (最強タッグ); 046. "Poison Gas" (毒ガス); 047. "6%"; 048. "The True Purpose of Martial Arts" (格闘技の本番); 049. "A Match vs. A True Fight" (試合と本番); 050. "A Sense of Beauty" (美意識); 051. "Master" (師匠); 052. "The Meaning of Karate" (唐手の空手)
07	March 15, 2001	978-4-253-05623-6	December 17, 2018 (digital)	—
053. "Underground" (アンダーゾーン); 054. "Disappointment" (期待外れ); 055. "The Student-Master Relationship" (師匠思い); 056. "Kindness" (やさしいんだな); 057. "Home" (それが人生); 058. "Chance" (勝てるッ); 059. "Illusion" (虚像); 060. "Shaken to the Core" (激震); 061. "Shinshinkai" (神心会)
08	May 10, 2001	978-4-253-05624-3	January 15, 2019 (digital)	—
062. "1 Million Disciples" (門下100万人); 063. "Good Faith" (誠意); 064. "Hyyyyaaaaa!!" (ッしゃアァッ); 065. "Is that All you Got?!" (こんなもんかよ); 066. "Mid-air Battle" (空中決戦); 067. "Balance" (バランス); 068. "Mid-air Battle: The Showdown" (空中決戦決着!!); 069. "Memories" (記憶); 070. "The Title of "Sea King"" (海王の名)
09	July 26, 2001	978-4-253-20029-5	February 26, 2019 (digital)	—
071. "Tiger Slayer" (虎殺し); 072. "Revival" (復活!!); 073. "Feelings" (想い); 074. "Lips" (唇); 075. "Trap" (ワナ); 076. "Mirage" (幻惑); 077. "Premonition" (予感); 078. "Reunion" (再会); 079. "Showdown" (結着)
10	September 27, 2001	978-4-253-20030-1	March 5, 2019 (digital)	—
080. "Trick" (策略); 081. "Explosion" (爆裂); 082. "Irony" (喜劇); 083. "Candy" (キャンディ); 084. "10 Minutes Later" (10分後); 085. "You're Dead!" (許さねェッ!!); 086. "Just a Kid" (子供は子供); 087. "Oliva" (ミスターオリバ); 088. "Hunter" (ハンター)
11	December 13, 2001	978-4-253-20031-8	March 5, 2019 (digital)	—
089. "You've Got Balls!" (いい度胸だ); 090. "I'm Bored of You" (君はつまらん); 091. "Reason" (許されぬ自由); 092. "A Second Man" (もう一人の男); 093. "Bakiiii!!" (バキくんッッ); 094. "Death Dive" (デス･ダイブ); 095. "Climber" (クライマー); 096. "Round 3" (ラウンド3); 097. "Bravo!" (ブラボー)
12	February 28, 2002	978-4-253-20032-5	March 5, 2019 (digital)	—
098. "He's Back!" (その男再び); 099. "I Can't Wait!" (開始メヨウ); 0100. "Private Death Match" (密室の死闘); 101. "Aiki" (合気); 102. "Judo" (柔道); 103. "Tremendous Muscle" (超筋力); 104. "One Point" (一本ッッ!!); 105. "Take It" (持ってけ); 106. "Slash" (斬撃)
13	May 15, 2002	978-4-253-20033-2	March 5, 2019 (digital)	—
107. "Let Me Show You..." (見せてやるぜ!!); 108. "Graaaagghhh" (ゲハァッ!!); 109. "You Want a Fight?!" (上等ッ!!); 110. "The Ultimate Love" (最愛); 111. "Come On!!" (来いッ!!); 112. "Thank You..." (うれしい…); 113. "Nervous" (緊張); 114. "Dad!!" (親父ッ!!); 115. "Promise" (約束)
14	August 29, 2002	978-4-253-20034-9	March 5, 2019 (digital)	—
116. "Reaching New Heights" (強者への執念); 117. "What Are the Odds?!" (なんたる偶然!!); 118. "Blades of Fury Part 1" (怒りの剣撃①); 119. "Blades of Fury Part 2" (怒りの剣撃②); 120. "Finishing Bow" (とどめ); 121. "Fight to the Very End" (死闘の果てに); 122. "Protector" (警護る); 123. "Thanks!" (アリガトウ); 124. "Doyle Returns" (ドイル再び)
15	November 28, 2002	978-4-253-20035-6	March 5, 2019 (digital)	—
125. "Tail Between Your Legs" (バカヤロウ); 126. "Admission of Defeat" (認めるかい?); 127. "Run!!" (奔走); 128. "Pride" (意地); 129. "Respective Defeats" (それぞれの敗北); 130. "Poison Hand" (毒手); 131. "Maximum Potency" (毒功完成); 132. "Facing the Poison Hand Part 1" (毒手との闘い①); 133. "Facing the Poison Hand Part 2" (毒手との闘い②)
16	February 27, 2003	978-4-253-20036-3	March 5, 2019 (digital)	—
134. "A Second Assassin" (もう一人の殺法使い); 135. "A New Challenger" (もう一人……); 136. "Too Slow!" (遅すぎるッ); 137. "You Win" (アンタの勝ちだ); 138. "Escape" (逃亡); 139. "Forefist" (セ･イ･ケ･ン); 140. "Punishment" (制裁); 141. "Slash" (斬撃); 142. "That's That" (動かねェ…)
17	March 31, 2003	978-4-253-20037-0	March 5, 2019 (digital)	—
143. "Fighting Area" (闘争領域); 144. "Monster Part 1" (化物①); 145. "Monster Part 2" (化物②); 146. "Dream Stage" (夢舞台); 147. "Clash of the Alphas" (超雄対決!!); 148. "Weapon Time!!" (凶器攻撃ッ); 149. "Micro Monster" (小さな怪物); 150. "Never-Before-Seen Style" (未知なる闘法); 151. "Blind Fear" (見えざる恐怖)
18	June 26, 2003	978-4-253-20038-7	March 5, 2019 (digital)	—
152. "Blind Fear Part 2" (見えざる恐怖②); 153. "Real Attack" (本当の攻撃); 154. "Countdown" (カウント･ダウン); 155. "Gruesome" (凄絶); 156. "Source of Danger" (危機の源); 157. "Deciding the Outcome" (勝負とは); 158. "Reunion" (再会); 159. "Body Changes" (異形); 160. "Death - The Ultimate Opponent" (死という凶敵)
19	August 28, 2003	978-4-253-20039-4	March 5, 2019 (digital)	—
161. "Overwhelming" (圧倒!!); 162. "Where To?" (何処へ); 163. "God and the Devil" (神と鬼); 164. "God's Intention" (神の真意); 165. "God's Hiatus" (神の空白); 166. "The Devil's Respect" (鬼の敬意); 167. "Too Late?!" (遅すぎた!?); 168. "Successors" (継ぐ者たち); 169. "Past Promises" (あの日の約束)
20	November 13, 2003	978-4-253-20040-0	March 5, 2019 (digital)	—
170. "Bewildered" (五里霧中); 171. "The Curtain Rises Part 1" (幕開け①); 172. "The Curtain Rises Part 2" (幕開け②); 173. "Untouchable" (当たらない); 174. "The Centennial Tournament" (大擂台賽); 175. "Declaration of Victory" (勝利宣言); 176. "Fate" (因縁); 177. "Determination" (決意); 178. "Gathering" (集結)
21	February 26, 2004	978-4-253-20041-7	March 5, 2019 (digital)	—
179. "Qualification" (資格); 180. "Tragedy" (惨劇); 181. "Sea King Ryu" (劉 海王); 182. "Prayer" (祈り); 183. "Dance of the Butterfly" (蝶の舞い); 184. "Courage" (勇気); 185. "Quick Victory" (短期決戦ッッ!?); 186. "Enough..." (もう…ッッ); 187. "Shift" (転じる!)
22	May 20, 2004	978-4-253-20042-4	April 2, 2019 (digital)	—
188. "Revival" (復活ッッ!!); 189. "Eat!!" (喰らうッッ!!); 190. "Unprecedented Recovery" (超回復ッッ!!); 191. "Sea Emperor Kaku" (郭 海皇); 192. "The Meaning of "Martial Arts"" ("武"とはッッ!?); 193. "Awakening" (目覚め); 194. "Candy" (キャンディー); 195. "Another Form of Martial Arts" (これも武術); 196. "Diamond" (ダイアモンド)
23	August 26, 2004	978-4-253-20043-1	April 2, 2019 (digital)	—
197. "The Triad Fist" (三合拳); 198. "Headhunting" (ヘッドハンティング!!); 199. "Get Outta My Face!!" (失せろッッ); 200. "Clash" (激突ッッ); 201. "The Chinese Allied Forces" (中国連合軍); 202. "Fortitude" (心意気やよし); 203. "The Japanese/American Team Formation" (日米軍結成!!); 204. "Undefeated" (生涯無敗); 205. "Dark Martial Arts" (闇拳法)
24	November 25, 2004	978-4-253-20044-8	May 7, 2019 (digital)	—
206. "Strike and Sheath" (居合); 207. "Mystery" (神秘); 208. "Hand Pocket" (ハンドポケット); 209. "Flair" (スマート); 210. "A Placid Heart" (心涼しきは…); 211. "One Man One Kill" (一人一殺); 212. "Absolute Best" (ベストコンディション); 213. "Impatience" (焦燥); 214. "Join Me" (組もう)
25	February 8, 2005	978-4-253-20045-5	May 7, 2019 (digital)	—
215. "I Believed in You!" (信じていた); 216. "Get Up!" (起きたまえ); 217. "Unbelievable!!" (スバラシイッッ); 218. "A Mere Martial Artist" (たかが拳法); 219. "Self-defense" (護身); 220. "Eye-Opener" (開眼!!!); 221. "Victor" (勝利者); 222. "Dance" (舞); 223. "Kick" (蹴る)
26	April 8, 2005	978-4-253-20046-2	June 4, 2019 (digital)	—
224. "Kick the Ground" (大地を…蹴る); 225. "Sea Emperor" (海皇); 226. "Strength" (力); 227. "Principle" (理合); 228. "The Ultimate Art" (究極の武); 229. "Shaori" (消力); 230. "Stiffening" (硬直); 231. "The Sea Emperor's Fist" (海皇の拳); 232. "Limpness" (脱力)
27	July 8, 2005	978-4-253-20977-9	June 4, 2019 (digital)	—
233. "School" (流儀); 234. "The Weak" (弱者); 235. "Handicap" (ハンデ); 236. "The Devil" (鬼); 237. "The Chinese Art of Self-defense" (中国拳法); 238. "Deathly Wails" (鬼哭); 239. "Death" (死); 240. "The Ultimate Title" (最強の称号); 241. "Starting Point" (原点)
28	September 8, 2005	978-4-253-20978-6	July 2, 2019 (digital)	—
242. "Number One" (一番); 243. "Jujutsu and Boxing" (柔術と拳闘); 244. "Hand Speed" (ハンドスイード); 245. "Marriage" (結婚); 246. "Karate and Boxing" (空手と拳闘); 247. "Rules" (ルール); 248. "Best Shot" (ベストショット); 249. "Proposal" (アプローチ); 250. "Another Hanma" (もうひとりのハンマー)
29	November 8, 2005	978-4-253-20979-3	July 2, 2019 (digital)	—
251. "One Minute" (一分); 252. "How the Hell...?!" (ナント…); 253. "Never..." (イツダッテ); 254. "Come and Get It..." (来…イ…ヨ…); 255. "Fight" (決闘); 256. "Worse for Wear" (大変); 257. "Our World" (こっちの世界); 258. "Orochi's Fist" (愚地の拳); 259. "Its Up to You" (自由)
30	February 8, 2006	978-4-253-20980-9	August 6, 2019 (digital)	—
260. "A Fight" (ファイト); 261. "Coward" (臆病者); 262. "Eloquence" (雄弁); 263. "Strongest = Greatest" (最強=最高); 265. "Sincerity" (誠意); 265. "The Human Body" (人体); 266. "Challenger" (挑戦者); 267. "Excuses" (テキトー); 268. "Tremendous Courage" (大変な勇気)
31	March 8, 2006	978-4-253-20981-6	August 27, 2019 (digital)	—
269. "My Place" (場); 270. "Champion" (チャンピオン); 271. "Fight to the Death" (命のやり取り); 272. "Readiness" (覚悟); 273. "Completion" (完成); 274. "Warrior" (戦士); 275. "Right to Challenge" (挑戦資格); 276. "Global Scale" (地球規模)

== Baki Hanma ==
No.	Release date	ISBN
01	April 7, 2006	978-4-253-20983-0
02	April 7, 2006	978-4-253-20984-7
03	July 7, 2006	978-4-253-20985-4
04	October 6, 2006	978-4-253-20986-1
05	December 8, 2006	978-4-253-20987-8
06	February 8, 2007	978-4-253-20988-5
07	May 8, 2007	978-4-253-20989-2
08	July 6, 2007	978-4-253-20990-8
09	September 7, 2007	978-4-253-20991-5
10	November 8, 2007	978-4-253-20992-2
11	January 8, 2008	978-4-253-20993-9
12	April 8, 2008	978-4-253-20994-6
13	June 6, 2008	978-4-253-20995-3
14	August 8, 2008	978-4-253-20996-0
15	October 8, 2008	978-4-253-20997-7
16	December 8, 2008	978-4-253-20998-4
17	February 6, 2009	978-4-253-20999-1
18	May 8, 2009	978-4-253-21000-3
19	July 8, 2009	978-4-253-21007-2
20	October 8, 2009	978-4-253-21008-9
21	December 8, 2009	978-4-253-21009-6
22	February 8, 2010	978-4-253-21010-2
23	April 8, 2010	978-4-253-21017-1
24	June 8, 2010	978-4-253-21018-8
25	September 8, 2010	978-4-253-21019-5
26	November 8, 2010	978-4-253-21020-1
27	January 7, 2011	978-4-253-21040-9
28	April 7, 2011	978-4-253-21103-1
29	June 8, 2011	978-4-253-21104-8
30	August 8, 2011	978-4-253-21105-5
31	October 7, 2011	978-4-253-21106-2
32	December 8, 2011	978-4-253-21107-9
33	February 8, 2012	978-4-253-21108-6
34	May 8, 2012	978-4-253-21109-3
35	July 6, 2012	978-4-253-21110-9
36	September 7, 2012	978-4-253-21116-1
37	October 5, 2012	978-4-253-21117-8

== Baki-Dou ==
No.	Release date	ISBN
01	May 8, 2014	978-4-253-22341-6
02	August 8, 2014	978-4-253-22342-3
03	November 7, 2014	978-4-253-22343-0
04	January 8, 2015	978-4-253-22344-7
05	March 6, 2015	978-4-253-22345-4
06	June 8, 2015	978-4-253-22346-1
07	August 7, 2015	978-4-253-22347-8
08	October 8, 2015	978-4-253-22348-5
09	January 8, 2016	978-4-253-22349-2
10	March 8, 2016	978-4-253-22350-8
11	May 6, 2016	978-4-253-22351-5
12	July 8, 2016	978-4-253-22352-2
13	September 8, 2016	978-4-253-22353-9
14	December 6, 2016	978-4-253-22354-6
15	January 6, 2017	978-4-253-22355-3
16	April 7, 2017	978-4-253-22356-0
17	June 8, 2017	978-4-253-22357-7
18	September 7, 2017	978-4-253-22358-4
19	November 8, 2017	978-4-253-22359-1
20	February 8, 2018	978-4-253-22360-7
21	April 6, 2018	978-4-253-22361-4
22	June 8, 2018	978-4-253-22362-1

== Bakidou ==
No.	Release date	ISBN
01	March 8, 2019	978-4-253-22363-8
02	March 8, 2019	978-4-253-22364-5
03	July 8, 2019	978-4-253-22365-2
04	November 8, 2019	978-4-253-22366-9
05	March 6, 2020	978-4-253-22367-6
06	July 8, 2020	978-4-253-22368-3
07	October 8, 2020	978-4-253-22369-0
08	January 8, 2021	978-4-253-22370-6
09	May 7, 2021	978-4-253-22375-1
10	July 8, 2021	978-4-253-22399-7
11	October 8, 2021	978-4-253-22400-0
12	January 7, 2022	978-4-253-28122-5
13	May 6, 2022	978-4-253-28123-2
14	September 8, 2022	978-4-253-28124-9
15	February 8, 2023	978-4-253-28125-6
16	May 8, 2023	978-4-253-28126-3
17	September 7, 2023	978-4-253-28127-0

== Baki Rahen ==
No.	Release date	ISBN
01	April 8, 2024	978-4-253-28421-9
02	August 7, 2024	978-4-253-28422-6
03	December 6, 2024	978-4-253-28423-3
04	April 8, 2025	978-4-253-28424-0
05	September 8, 2025	978-4-253-00152-6
06	February 6, 2026	978-4-253-01137-2
07	July 8, 2026	978-4-253-01394-9
