= Xavion =

American rock band

- Origin: Memphis, Tennessee, U.S.
- Years active: 1980s
- Label: Asylum Records
- Past members: Dexter Haygood; Michael "Slugger" Tucker; Johnnie Woods; Kevan Wilkins; Skip Johnson; Derwin S. Adams

Xavion was a rock band from Memphis, Tennessee, that was active in the 1980s. They had the distinction of being the first African-American rock group to appear on MTV. They are known for the singles "Get Me Hot" and "Eat Your Heart Out".

== Background ==
The band was founded by Michael "Slugger" Tucker and later discovered by Jim Delehart of Mirage Records. It was fronted by Dexter Haygood and at one stage they toured with Hall & Oates. The also toured with The Bar Kays, The Romantics and Sly & the Family Stone. They were managed by Tommy Mottola. They also had a degree of success with "Get Me Hot" and "Eat Your Heart Out". They were around four years before Living Colour arrived on the scene and a little over a year before Mazarati, and in spite of being the first African-American rock band to be featured on MTV, they never found the success that Living Color achieved. They performed their single "Eat Your Heart Out" on MTV.

In early December 1984, their album Burnin' Hot was Bubbling Under the Top 200 Albums chart at no 205. They were pictured in the January 25, 1985 issue of Billboard with Mirage/Asylum/Nonesuch Records staff members Mike Bone and Lisa Frank who was being held up by one of the band members.

=== Later years ===
Around October 2011, Haygood was looking to re-form the group. After appearing on X Factor, he was noticed by some of his former bandmates. Today Haygood appears also as a solo performer. Michael "Slugger" Tucker has a solo album entitled 2 Times Ten. The Xavion group has new management with Donald Askew Jr., the CEO of Soul Star Entertainment.

== Discography ==
=== Album ===
Title	Release info	Year	Format	Notes #
Burnin' Hot	Asylum Records 60375-1; Mirage Records 60375-1	1984	LP	

=== Singles ===
Title	Release info	Year	Notes #
"Eat Your Heart Out" / "You're My Type"	Asylum Records 7-69707	1984	Producers: Chris Lord-Alge, Jim Delehant; Co-producer: Xavion
"Eat Your Heart Out" (Album Version) / "Eat Your Heart Out" (Dance Version) "Eat Your Heart Out" (Dub Version)	Asylum Records ED 4999	1984	Producers: Chris Lord-Alge, Jim Delehant; Co-producer: Xavion
"Get Me Hot" (Vocal / LP Version)	Asylum Records ED 5029	1984 (promo)	Producers: Chris Lord-Alge, Jim Delehant; Co-producer/composer: Xavion
