= Burnin' Hot =

Studio album by Xavion
- Released: September 1984
- Studio: Ardent Studios (Memphis, Tennessee)
- Genre: Hard rock; heavy metal; pop; funk; soul; R&B
- Length: 36:53
- Label: Asylum; Elektra
- Producer: Chris Lord-Alge; Jim Delehant

Singles from Burnin' Hot
- 1. "Eat Your Heart Out" Released: September 1984; 2. "Get Me Hot" Released: 1985

Burnin' Hot is the only album by American rock band Xavion, released in October 1984 by Asylum and Elektra Records. It was produced with Chris Lord-Alge and Jim Delehant at Ardent Studios in the band's hometown of Memphis, Tennessee.

The album's style has been described as a mix of hard rock, heavy metal, soul and funk, with dance elements. The group's leader, keyboardist Derwin Adams, believed that the group leaned more towards rock than soul music, though noted the wide array of influences brought by each of the six members. Some critics have contextualised the album as an African-American response to the success of Michael Jackson's 'rock-funk' fusion "Beat It" (1983) and the hard rock elements of Prince's Purple Rain (1984). The album reached number 201 on Billboard's Bubbling Under the Top 200 Albums chart, while the lead single "Eat Your Heart Out" was placed in medium rotation on MTV. The group promoted the album with a tour supporting Hall & Oates in late 1984. In 1991, Chuck Eddy ranked Burnin' Hot at number 492 in his list of the 500 best heavy metal albums.

== Background and recording ==
Xavion originated in 1982 when keyboardist Derwin Adams and drummer Michael "Slugger" Tucker formed a song-writing partnership. Transforming Xavion into a band, the duo added four more musicians to the line-up over the next few years: vocalist Dexter Haygood, lead guitarist Kevan Wilkins, bassist Skip Johnson and secondary keyboardist Johnnie Woods. The group became known for their performances on the fraternity and sorority party circuit in Austin, and received the attention of the major label Elektra Records, who signed the band in December 1983. Adams commented in late 1984 that: "Everything has moved so fast for us, it's unbelievable. A year ago we were playing in our hometown (Memphis) and then the record deal came through last December". Contemporary reports singled out the band for their notable aversion to recreational drugs, an example set by Adams, the band's de facto leader.

Produced by Chris Lord-Alge and Jim Delehant, and co-produced by Xavion, Burnin' Hot was recorded at Ardent Studios in Memphis, Tennessee. Lord-Alge and his brother Tommy engineered the recording with Joe Hardy. The album was mixed at Unique Studios in New York City and mastered at fellow New York studio Atlantic Studios. The group's manager Tommy Mottola receives an album credit.

== Composition ==
Burnin' Hot is a mix of hard rock and soul music with a club-style dance backing, and features what critic Prentis Rogers describes as "screeching guitars, punchy if not raunchy vocals, pounding drums and flimsy lyrics." The group's root influences including Jimi Hendrix, Led Zeppelin and Deep Purple, with the album being further inspired by Prince; a contributor to The Monitor especially highlighted the heavy use of "percolating keyboards and bubbling guitar" as examples of Prince's influence. Brown Burnett of The Commercial Appeal highlighted the record's "unusual, driving blend of rock, rhythm and blues." Rogers considers the album to be primarily a rock album with elements of funk, regardless of the group's aversion to being "funky or soulful".

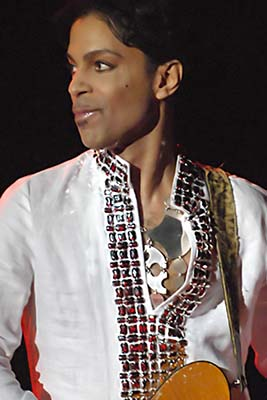
Critics drew comparison between Xavion and Prince (pictured 2008).

Music critic Chuck Eddy describes Burnin' Hot as one of several explicit heavy metal moves by African-American musicians recorded following the success of Michael Jackson's "Beat It" (1983) – which he deems the "high-water mark of rock-funk integration" – alongside Shalamar's "Dead Giveaway" (1983) and Kool & the Gang's "Misled" (1984). Eddy contends that, similarly to those songs, Burnin' Hot embellishes "every studio-slicked Hall and Oates melody with some curt sort of dime-a-dozen AOR solo." The critic Tom Harrison similarly describes the album as a product of the "slipstream" created by "Beat It", believing that "the hard-rock influence found on Prince's Purple Rain, and in commercially acceptable doses on Michael Jackson's Thriller had to inspire a response from new, emerging black recording artists." Fellow critic Kent Zimmerman felt that "an onslaught of black performers interpreting hard rock" was inevitable after the success of Prince, believing that black music and heavy metal/hard rock share similar elements of "special effects, theatrics, and costuming."

Adams commented on the band's influences in an interview with The Commercial Appeal: "We have some people in our band who were into hard rock, some into jazz, some into soul, and I've been heavily influenced by classical music. That's where we get our sound." In an interview with the Kennebec Journal, Adams said that R&B did not give the band "enough power and strength" or move them musically, whereas "rock 'n' roll did. That's why we lean towards the rock genre." Despite his preference for rock to soul music, Adams studied Bach, Beethoven and Mozart at Memphis State University, where he was a music major: "When I listen to symphonies, I hear a million songs in them. That's where I get a lot of my creativity, from being exposed to [classical music]."

According to critic Jack Brandt, the opening track "Eat Your Heart Out" demonstrates Xavion's "capbilities within the pop medium", while "Don't Let It Go to Your Head" is a fast-paced song that "combines pseudo-punk with pseudo-funk". "Self-Built Hell" features intricate electronic beats and laidback raps, while "Burnin' Hot" features slap bass parts evocative of Rick James' "Super Freak" (1981) and "lusty sing-splat" comparable to Prince's "Partyup" (1980). The slower power ballad "Get Me Hot" closes the album. Adams said that the group used their music to advocate fitness, positivity, going to school and loving family members, reflecting his belief that musicians "have a great power of being able to communicate to large groups of people" which should be used to "help people, not hinder them."

== Release and promotion ==
Xavion's debut album, Burnin' Hot was released in September 1984 through Elektra and Asylum Records. Despite the album's mix of hard rock and soul, the album cover is a typical heavy metal design, and avoids showing an image of the group. Elektra advertised the release with a magazine advert stating that the LP would "ignite even the most passive listeners", while journalist Jack Brandt believed the album and Xavion's then-impending tour with Hall & Oates could bring the band fame. In November, the album reached number 201 on Billboard's Bubbling Under the Top 200 Albums chart, an extension of the Billboard Top 200 Albums. Adams commented on the airplay the record received in the Northeastern United States. Released in September 1984, the album's first single was "Eat Your Heart Out". The song received afternoon play on KSJO, while its music video received medium rotation on MTV. In January 1985, "Get Me Hot" reached number 70 on the black radio singles chart published by Black Radio Exclusive, and number 55 on the "Top Black 100 Contemporary Singles" chart in Cashbox a month later.

=== Hall & Oates tour ===
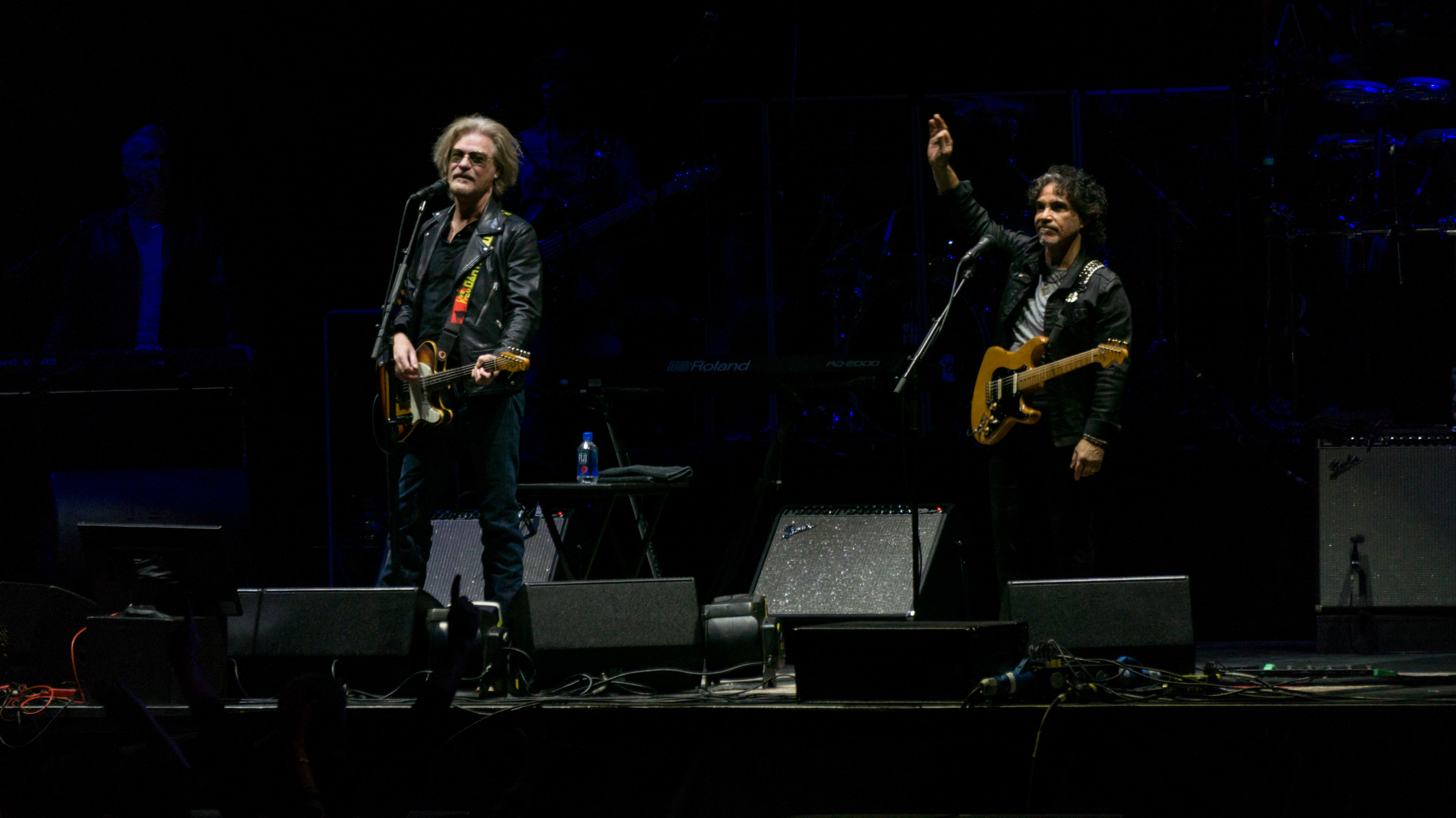
Xavion promoted Burnin' Hot with a tour supporting Hall & Oates (pictured 2017).

In June 1984, Xavion signed a contract to support Hall & Oates on their upcoming tour, an opportunity that left them "psyched". Named "Live Thru' 85", it was Xavion's first major tour. The first leg spanned 37 dates, largely in the Northeast and West Coast of the U.S. Adams said that, with only 30 minutes to "squeeze the album [into their sets]", the group chose to shorten two of the songs, and planned for it to be a "a very exciting show with explosions and fog." By November 1984, the group dedicated afternoons to interviews and promotional efforts, and evenings to tour rehearsals which could last into the early morning, leading Adams to comment that it was the hardest the group had ever worked.

On the tour's opening show at the Bangor Auditorium, Maine, on October 26, 1984, Xavion's six-song set began with "Self-Built Hell", "You're My Type" and "Can't Get My Connection", which were fused into a churning medley, followed by three songs played in full—the slower "Get Me Hot" and the rockers "Eat Your Heart Out" and the title track. At the start of their show at the St. Paul Civic Center, Minnesota on November 19, Adams quoted the synthesizer beeps from Prince's "Erotic City" (1984). During their performance at the Sioux Falls Arena, South Dakota, the following evening, Xavion wore black leather clothes and animal skins and advertised the album between songs, while at one point the half-clad Johnnie Woods did bumps and grinds.

Reviewing the Bangor Auditorium show, Lucy Clark of TV-Plus noted the enthusiastic fans who screamed at Haygood's dancing and Adams' poses, the latter wearing a sleeveless top, and commented that the performance was well received by Hall & Oates fans. Reviewing the St. Paul Civic Center show, Martin Keller of the Minnesota Star Tribune commented on Xavion's "brief and energetic set", drawing comparison to Prince's one-time guitarist Dez Dickerson, but felt that only the title track was memorable, believing that while the group's "colorblind heavy metal approach" is "an interesting development in rock", they lacked strong material and "would do well to integrate more funk into its mix". Keller added that Xavion should see Hall & Oates and Prince for effective examples of how black and white music can work well together. Betsy Gerboth of Argus Leader, reviewing the Sioux Falls show, believed Xavion "didn't do much to warm up the crowd" over their 30-minute set of "inept, derivative and extremely loud music that couldn't decide whether it wanted to be heavy metal rock 'n' roll or rhythm 'n' blues."

== Critical reception and legacy ==
Professional ratings
Review scores
Source	Rating
Omaha World-Herald	3.5/5 stars

Reviewing Burnin' Hot for the Colorado Springs Gazette, Jonathan Takiff dubbed Xavion "an explosive rock 'n' roll force" in the same vein as Prince, who had proved anew that "black people rock without compromise", and added that Prince's crossover tendencies were evident in Xavion's music. In a positive review, Roger Catlin of the Omaha World-Herald described Xavion as a black band that "carries off a marriage between hard rock and solid soul", and believed the album attempts to create "a heavy mix" evocative of Run-D.M.C.'s "Rock Box" (1984), with "Eat Your Heart Out" being the best example, though qualified his praise by stating that "the band is in the formative stage." Tom Harrison of The Province felt that Burnin' Hot resembled a cross between the Isley Brothers and Van Halen, calling it "protean hard rock with a dance-club bottom and heavy-metal guitars."

Prentis Rogers of The Atlanta Journal deemed Xavion to be "soul brothers in the rock band gettin' down", noting their "obvious cue" from Prince, and felt that while the album is largely a straight rock album with little variety, there is "some funk" in the music, with many of the tracks living up to the album title. Characterising Xavion as "pop/funk artists", Images reviewer Jack Brandt wrote that despite the occasionally "rough" lyrics, Burnin' Hot is a "fine debut album" of "semi-original concepts", and that while Xavion "break no new ground, [they] are very good on the whole." He further highlighted the slower closing track "Get Me Hot" as the album's most creative and unique song.

Some critics believed Burnin' Hot would alienate audiences; Rogers felt that acceptance was "the key question", wondering "which – if any – audience takes to the album", while Harrison felt it would be a culture shock for both black and white audiences and "may satisfy neither". The Gavin Report's Kent Zimmerman also commented on this, believing that black radio's reaction would be interesting to observe "since there's nary a funk lick on the whole disc." Reviewing the songs "Don't Let It Go to Your Head", "Burnin' Hot" and "Eat Your Heart Out" for the publication, Zimmerman believed that Wilkins' "biting edge" as a guitarist was responsible for the band venturing "far closer to the hard rock style than any other existing black artists", comparing them to Mother's Finest.

In 1991, Chuck Eddy ranked Burnin' Hot at number 492 in his list of the 500 best heavy metal albums ever. He described it as "not a bad cash-in at all: Not only is the bassist twitcher than in your average metal ensemble and the guitarist raunchier than in your average funk assemblage, but Dexter Haygood can actually sing, a rare [heavy metal] distinction for sure." He added that, regardless of the gushier songs that appear later in the album, "a few songs spritz straightaway into your fists and feets alike".

== Track listing ==
All songs written by Xavion

Side one

1. "Eat Your Heart Out" – 3:33
2. "Burnin' Hot" – 4:10
3. "Don't Let It Go to Your Head" – 3:47
4. "Self-Built Hell" – 4:52
5. "Tell Me" – 3:45

Side two

6. "Love Games" – 4:14
7. "Can't Get My Connection" – 4:36
8. "You're My Type" – 3:44
9. "Get Me Hot" – 4:08

iTunes bonus tracks

10. "Eat Your Heart Out" (Dance Version) – 5:11
11. "Eat Your Heat Out" (Dub Version) – 5:19

== Personnel ==
Adapted from the liner notes of Burnin' Hot

- Dexter Haygood – lead vocals
- Kevan Wilkins – lead guitar
- Skip Johnson – bass
- Derwin S. Adams – keyboards, liner notes
- Johnnie Woods – keyboards
- Michael "Slugger" Tucker – drums
- Chris Lord-Alge – producer, engineer
- Jim Delehant – producer
- Joe Hardy – engineer
- Tommy Lord-Alge – engineer
- Bob Defrin – art direction, design
- Mark Tucker – photography
- Tommy Steele – Xavion logo
- Tommy Mottola – management

== Charts ==
Chart performance for Burnin' Hot
Chart (1984)	Peak position
Billboard Bubbling Under the Top 200 Albums	201
