= Audie Award for Faith-Based Fiction and Nonfiction =

Award given by Audio Publishers Association

The Audie Award for Faith-Based Fiction and Nonfiction is one of the Audie Awards presented annually by the Audio Publishers Association (APA). It awards excellence in narration, production, and content for a religious or spiritual audiobook released in a given year. Before 2019, this was given as two distinct awards, the Audie Award for Inspirational and Faith-Based Fiction (awarded since 2003) and the Audie Award for Inspirational and Faith-Based Nonfiction (awarded since 1997), known as the Audie Award for Inspirational or Spiritual Title before 2007.

== Faith-based fiction and nonfiction recipients ==
=== 2010s ===
Year	Title	Author	Narrator(s)	Publisher	Result	Ref.
2019 24th	The Man on the Mountaintop (2017)	Susan Trott	Libby Spurrier	Audible	Winner	
2019 24th	The Christmas Star (2018)	Donna VanLiere	Donna VanLiere	Macmillan Audio	Finalist	
2019 24th	Goliath Code (2017)	Suzanne Leonhard	Gabrielle de Cuir	ACZ/Audible	Finalist	
2019 24th	Pull It Off: Removing Your Fears and Putting On Confidence (2018)	Julianna Zobrist	Julianna Zobrist	Hachette Audio	Finalist	
2019 24th	The Rogue (2017)	Lee W. Brainard	Thérèse Plummer	Podium Publishing	Finalist	

=== 2020s ===
Year	Title	Author	Narrator(s)	Publisher	Result	Ref.
2020 25th	How the Light Gets In (2018)	Jolina Petersheim	Tavia Gilbert	Oasis Audio	Winner	
2020 25th	Breathe Again (2019)	Niki Hardy	Niki Hardy	Oasis Audio	Finalist	
2020 25th	Conscious: A Brief Guide to the Fundamental Mystery of the Mind (2019)	Annaka Harris	Annaka Harris	HarperAudio	Finalist	
2020 25th	Dare to See: Discovering God in the Everyday (2019)	Katie Brown	Katie Brown	Hachette Audio	Finalist	
2020 25th	The Prequel (2017)	Jacquelin Thomas	Janina Edwards	The Audio Flow	Finalist	
2021 26th	Fierce, Free, and Full of Fire (2020)	Jen Hatmaker	Jen Hatmaker	Thomas Nelson	Winner	
2021 26th	Chasing Vines (2020)	Beth Moore	Beth Moore	Oasis Audio	Finalist	
2021 26th	Cliff Falls: The Missing Pieces Edition (2020)	C. B. Shiepe	Santino Fontana	Cliff Falls Media	Finalist	
2021 26th	Old School Love (2020)	Joseph Simmons and Justine Simmons	Joseph Simmons and Justine Simmons	HarperAudio	Finalist	
2021 26th	The Power of Favor (2019)	Joel Osteen	Joel Osteen	Hachette Audio	Finalist	
2022 27th	The Gift of Black Folk	W. E. B. Du Bois	Arnell Powell	Brilliance Publishing	Winner	
2022 27th	Crazy Faith	Michael Todd	Aaron Goodson	Penguin Random House Audio	Finalist	
2022 27th	The Happiest Man on Earth	Jaku Eddie	Raphael Corkhill	HarperAudio	Finalist	
2022 27th	He Saw That It Was Good	Sho Baraka and Chris Broussard	Sho Baraka	Penguin Random House Audio	Finalist	
2022 27th	Home Sweet Road	Johnnyswim	Abner Ramirez	Penguin Random House Audio	Finalist	
2023 28th	Dark Angel	Brian Andrews and Jeffrey Wilson	MacLeod Andrews	Tyndale House	Winner	
2023 28th	Marriage Be Hard	Kevin Fredericks and Melissa Fredericks	Kevin Fredericks and Melissa Fredericks	Penguin Random House Audio	Finalist	
2023 28th	Part of My World	Jodi Benson and Carol Traver, foreword by Paige O'Hara	Jodi Benson	Tyndale House	Finalist	
2023 28th	The Prophet's Wife	Libbie Grant	Sophie Amoss	HarperAudio	Finalist	
2023 28th	You Should Sit Down for This	Tamera Mowry-Housley	Tamera Mowry-Housley	Hachette Audio	Finalist	
2024 29th	Dark Fall	Brian Andrews and Jeffrey Wilson	MacLeod Andrews	Tyndale House Publishers	Winner	
2024 29th	The Year of Jubilee	Cindy Morgan	Sisi Aisha Johnson	Recorded Books	Finalist	
2024 29th	Once We Were Home	Jennifer Rosner	Gabra Zackman and Vikas Adam	Macmillan Audio	Finalist	
2024 29th	Six Sermons	Asa Merritt	Stephanie Hsu and a full cast	Audible Originals	Finalist	
2024 29th	Soul Boom - Why We Need a Spiritual Revolution	Rainn Wilson	Rainn Wilson	Hachette Audio	Finalist	
2025 30th	The American Queen	Vanessa Miller	Angel Pean	HarperAudio	Winner	
2025 30th	Do the New You	Steven Furtick	Steven Furtick	Hachette Audio	Finalist	
2025 30th	Intercessor	John Robert Still	Jonathan Beville	Covenant Books	Finalist	
2025 30th	Life-Minded	Brady Boyd	Chris Abell	Our Daily Bread Publishing	Finalist	
2025 30th	Mostly What God Does	Savannah Guthrie	Savannah Guthrie	HarperAudio	Finalist	
2026 31st	Silent Horizons	Chad Robichaux and Jack Stewart	Ray Porter	Tyndale Fiction	Winner	
2026 31st	The Bible Recap for Kids	Tara-Leigh Cobble	Emma Faye	Christian Audio	Finalist	
2026 31st	Embergold	Rachelle Nelson	Aimee Lilly	Oasis Audio	Finalist	
2026 31st	Every Deadly Suspicion	Janice Cantore	Jeannie Sheneman	Tyndale Fiction	Finalist	
2026 31st	The Last Keeper, The Dream Keeper Saga Book 5	Kathryn Butler	Shannon McManus	Crossway/Good News Publishing	Finalist	
2026 31st	The Rebel Girls of Rome	Jordyn Taylor	Jennifer Jill Araya and Jesse Vilinsky	HarperAudio	Finalist	

== Nonfiction recipients 1997–2018 ==
=== 1990s ===
Year	Title	Author	Narrator(s)	Publisher	Result	Ref.
1997 2nd	The Christmas Tree (1996)	Julie Salamon	David Birney	Random House Audio	Winner	
1997 2nd	Conversations with God (1995)	Neale Donald Walsch	Neale Donald Walsch, Edward Asner, and Ellen Burstyn	Audio Literature	Finalist	
1997 2nd	Grow Old Along with Me: The Best Is Yet to Be (1996)	Sandra Haldeman Martz	Edward Asner, Ellen Burstyn, C. C. H. Pounder, and Alfre Woodard	Audio Literature	Finalist	
1998 3rd	Just As I Am (1997)	Billy Graham	Cliff Barrows	Hachette Audio	Winner	
1998 3rd	Girlfriends: Invisible Bonds, Enduring Tales (1995)	Carmen Renee Berry and Tamara Traeder	Cindy Williams, Katy Hickman, and Amy Hill	Audio Literature	Finalist	
1998 3rd	The Greatest Story Ever Told (1949)	Fulton Oursler	Edward Herrmann	HighBridge Audio	Finalist	
1999 4th	Still Me (1999)	Christopher Reeve	Christopher Reeve	Random House Audio	Winner	
1999 4th	The Complete Audio Bible: Old Testament (1611)		Michael York et al.	Dove Audio	Finalist	
1999 4th	The New Testament (1970)		Max McLean	Oasis Audio	Finalist	

=== 2000s ===
Year	Title	Author(s)	Narrator(s)(s)	Publisher	Result	Ref.
2000 5th	Reason for Hope: A Spiritual Journey (1999)	Jane Goodall and Phillip Berman	Jane Goodall	Time Warner AudioBooks	Winner	
2000 5th	Friendship with God (2002)	Neale Donald Walsch	Neale Donald Walsch, Edward Asner, and Ellen Burstyn	NewStar Media	Finalist	
2000 5th	Song of the Sun (1999)	Andrew Harvey	Andrew Harvey	Sounds True	Finalist	
2001 6th	It's Not About the Bike (2000)	Lance Armstrong and Sally Jenkins	Oliver Wyman	HighBridge Audio	Winner	
2001 6th	How to Know God (2000)	Deepak Chopra	Deepak Chopra	Random House Audio	Finalist	
2001 6th	Like Gold Refined (2000)	Janette Oke	Alexandra O'Karma	Recorded Books	Finalist	
2002 7th	NIV Audio Bible: New Testament (1978)	Zondervan Publishing	Full cast	Zondervan Publishing	Winner	
2002 7th	The Listener's Bible (1978)		Max McLean	Fellowship for the Performing Arts	Finalist	
2002 7th	Safely Home (2001)	Randy Alcorn	Steve Seger	Tyndale Audio	Finalist	
2003 8th	Conversations with God for Teens (2001)	Neale Donald Walsch	Neale Donald Walsch, Alanis Morissette, LeVar Burton, and full cast	Listening Library	Winner	
2003 8th	Restoring Faith (2001)	Forrest Church	Forrest Church et al.	The Audio Partners	Finalist	
2003 8th	Sister Wit (2002)	Jacqueline Jakes	Jacqueline Jakes, Bishop T. D. Jakes, and Melody Butiu	Time Warner AudioBooks	Finalist	
2003 8th	Wild & Wacky Totally True Bible Stories!: Volume 1 (2002)	Frank Peretti	Frank Peretti	Tommy Nelson	Finalist	
2004 9th	The Lakota Way (2001)	Joseph Marshall	Joseph Marshall	Makoche	Winner	
2004 9th	Creating True Peace (2005)	Thích Nhất Hạnh	Michael York	Simon & Schuster Audio	Finalist	
2004 9th	In the Presence of My Enemies (2003)	Gracia Burnham and Dean Merrill	Aimee Lilly	Tyndale Audio	Finalist	
2004 9th	The Art of Happiness at Work (2003)	His Holiness the Dalai Lama and Howard C. Cutler	Howard C. Cutler and B. D. Wong	Simon & Schuster Audio	Finalist	
2004 9th	The Red Suit Diaries (2003)	Ed Butchart	Ed Butchart	Brilliance Audio	Finalist	
2005 10th	The World According to Mister Rogers (2003)	Fred Rogers	Tyne Daly, John Lithgow, Lily Tomlin, and Andre Watts	Simon & Schuster Audio	Winner	
2005 10th	The Essential Word on the Street (2003)	Rob Lacey	Rob Lacey	Zondervan Publishing	Finalist	
2005 10th	The Faith of George W. Bush (2003)	Stephen Mansfield	J. Charles	Brilliance Audio	Finalist	
2005 10th	NIrV: The Little Kid's Adventure Bible (1996)		Full cast	Zondervan Publishing	Finalist	
2005 10th	The Soul of a Butterfly (2003)	Muhammad Ali and Hana Ali	Ossie Davis and Hana Ali	Simon & Schuster Audio	Finalist	
2006 11th	Finding God in Unexpected Places (1995)	Philip Yancey	Mel Foster	Brilliance Audio	Winner	
2006 11th	It's Not Easy Being Green (2005)	Jim Henson	Jim Henson and Friends	Hyperion Audio	Finalist	
2006 11th	The Journeys of Socrates (2005)	Dan Millman	Sam Tsoutsouvas	Hachette Audio	Finalist	
2006 11th	Life's Journeys According to Mister Rogers (2005)	Fred Rogers	Lily Tomlin, B. D. Wong, Blair Brown, and Richard Kind	Time Warner AudioBooks	Finalist	
2006 11th	Living in God's Love (2005)	Billy Graham	Billy Graham	Penguin Audio	Finalist	
2006 11th	Varanasi (2005)	Robert E. Svoboda	Robert E. Svoboda	Soundwalk	Finalist	
2007 12th	Inspired by... The Bible Experience: New Testament (2007)	Media Group	Angela Bassett, Cuba Gooding Jr., Samuel L. Jackson, Blair Underwood, Denzel Washington, and full cast	Zondervan Publishing	Winner	
2007 12th	Mama Made the Difference (2006)	T. D. Jakes	Richard Allen	Penguin Audiobooks	Finalist	
2007 12th	The Gospel of Jesus (2006)	Daniel L. Johnson	Garrison Keillor	HighBridge Audio	Finalist	
2007 12th	The Message: Remix (TBD)	Eugene H. Peterson	Full cast	Oasis Audio	Finalist	
2007 12th	The Screwtape Letters (1942)	C. S. Lewis	Ralph Cosham	Blackstone Audio	Finalist	
2008 13th	Inspired by... The Bible Experience: Old Testament (2007)	Media Group	Angela Bassett, Cuba Gooding Jr., Samuel L. Jackson, Blair Underwood, Denzel Washington, and full cast	Zondervan Publishing	Winner	
2008 13th	Ana's Story (2007)	Jenna Bush	Jenna Bush	Hachette Audio	Finalist	
2008 13th	Anger (2007)	Gary Chapman	Gary Chapman	Oasis Audio	Finalist	
2008 13th	Finding Home (2007)	Jim Daly	Jim Daly	Oasis Audio	Finalist	
2008 13th	The Great Omission (2006)	Dallas Willard	Grover Gardner	ChristianAudio	Finalist	
2008 13th	Vienna Prelude (2005)	Bodie Thoene	Sean Barrett	FamilyAudioLibrary.com	Finalist	
2009 14th	The Word of Promise: Next Generation (1982)		Sean Astin, Cody Linley, AnnaSophia Robb, Jordin Sparks, and full cast	Thomas Nelson	Winner	
2009 14th	Abraham Lincoln, a Man of Faith and Courage (2008)	Joe Wheeler	Grover Gardner	Oasis Audio	Finalist	
2009 14th	Life Beyond Measure (2008)	Sidney Poitier	Sidney Poitier	HarperAudio	Finalist	
2009 14th	Mother Teresa: Come By My Light (2007)	Brian Kolodiejchuk	Paul Smith and Sherry Kennedy-Brownrigg	St. Anthony Messenger Press	Finalist	
2009 14th	The Cross and the Switchblade (1963)	David Wilkerson and John and Elizabeth Sherrill	Paul Michael	ChristianAudio	Finalist	

=== 2010s ===
Year	Title	Author	Narrator(s)	Publisher	Result	Ref.
2010 15th	The Word of Promise Audio Bible (1982)		Michael York, Richard Dreyfuss, Gary Sinise, and full cast	Thomas Nelson	Winner	
2010 15th	The Hiding Place (1971)	Corrie ten Boom	Bernadette Dunne	ChristianAudio	Finalist	
2010 15th	Lord of the Ringless (2008)	Dee Aspin	Julie Williams	Voice-Overs.com	Finalist	
2010 15th	The Secret Holocaust Diaries (2009)	Nonna Bannister and Denise George	Rebecca Gallagher	Oasis Audio	Finalist	
2010 15th	What Southern Women Know About Faith (2009)	Ronda Rich	Ronda Rich	Zondervan Publishing	Finalist	
2011 16th	In a Heartbeat: Sharing the Power of Cheerful Giving (2010)	Leigh Anne and Sean Tuohy and Sally Jenkins	Leigh Anne and Sean Tuohy, Kathleen McInerney, and Rick Adamson	Macmillan Audio	Winner	
2011 16th	The Blueprint: A Plan for Living Above Life's Storms (2010)	Kirk Franklin	Dion Graham	Brilliance Audio	Finalist	
2011 16th	God Never Blinks (2010)	Regina Brett	Regina Brett	Hachette Audio	Finalist	
2011 16th	Shattered (2010)	Frank Pastore and Ellen Vaughn	Frank Pastore	Oasis Audio	Finalist	
2011 16th	Toward a True Kinship of Faiths (2010)	His Holiness the Dalai Lama	Richard Gere	Random House Audio	Finalist	
2012 17th	The Story, NIV: The Bible As One Continuing Story of God and His People (1978)		Michael Blain-Rozgay, Allison Moffett, and full cast	Zondervan Publishing	Winner	
2012 17th	All Is Grace (2011)	Brennan Manning and John Blasé	Maurice England	ChristianAudio	Finalist	
2012 17th	The Invisible World (2011)	Anthony DeStefano	Anthony DeStefano	Audible	Finalist	
2012 17th	The Jesuit Guide to (Almost) Everything (2010)	James Martin	Suzy Jackson	Audible	Finalist	
2012 17th	Resolving Everyday Conflict (2011)	Ken Sande	Maurice England	ChristianAudio	Finalist	
2013 18th	Fearless: The Undaunted Courage and Ultimate Sacrifice of Navy Seal Team Six Operator Adam Brown (2012)	Eric Blehm	Paul Michael	eChristian	Winner	
2013 18th	Anna and the King of Siam (1944)	Margaret Landon	Anne Flosnik	eChristian	Finalist	
2013 18th	King James Version Audio Bible: Pure Voice (1611)		Scott Brick et al.	Zondervan Publishing	Finalist	
2013 18th	His Love Endures Forever	Beth Wiseman	Kirsten Potter	eChristian	Finalist	
2013 18th	Real Marriage (2012)	Mark Driscoll and Grace Driscoll	Tavia Gilbert and William Dufris	eChristian	Finalist	
2014 19th	Keeping Hope Alive: One Woman—90,000 Lives Changed (2013)	Hawa Abdi and Sarah J. Robbins	Robin Miles	Hachette Audio	Winner	
2014 19th	Break Out! (2013)	Joel Osteen	Joel Osteen	Hachette Audio	Finalist	
2014 19th	Called to the Fire (2012)	Cheston M. Bush	David Cochran Heath	eChristian	Finalist	
2014 19th	Grace Happens Here (2012)	Max Lucado	Wayne Shepherd, Kate Rudd, and Luke Daniels	Brilliance Audio	Finalist	
2014 19th	Sparkly Green Earrings (2013)	Melanie Shankle	Melanie Shankle	eChristian	Finalist	
2015 20th	Before Amen: The Power of a Simple Prayer (2014)	Max Lucado	Ben Holland and Thomas Nelson	Thomas Nelson	Winner	
2015 20th	Living a Life That Matters (2012)	Ben Lesser	Ben Lesser and Jonathan Silverman	Remembrance Publishing	Finalist	
2015 20th	Prepared for a Purpose (2014)	Antoinette Tuff	Robin Miles	eChristian	Finalist	
2015 20th	The Singe and the Song (1999)	Miriam Therese Winter	Janis Ian	Audible	Finalist	
2015 20th	Steel Will (2014)	Shilo Harris	Johnny Heller	eChristian	Finalist	
2016 21st	The Boy Born Dead (2015)	David Ring	Paul Michael	ChristianAudio	Winner	
2016 21st	And Then There Were Nuns (2013)	Jane Christmas	Elizabeth Wiley	Post Hypnotic Press	Finalist	
2016 21st	Glory Days (2015)	Max Lucado	Ben Holland	Thomas Nelson/HarperAudio	Finalist	
2016 21st	The Pastor's Wife (1970)	Sabina Wurmbrand	Sadie Alexandru	ChristianAudio	Finalist	
2016 21st	Through the Eyes of a Lion (2015)	Levi Lusko	Levi Lusko	Thomas Nelson/HarperAudio	Finalist	
2017 22nd	The Awakening of HK Derryberry (2015)	Jim Bradford and Andy Hardin	Milton Bagby	Thomas Nelson	Winner	
2017 22nd	Divine Collision: An African Boy, an American Lawyer, and Their Remarkable Battle for Freedom (2016)	Jim Gash	Brandon Batchelar and Jason White	Oasis Audio	Finalist	
2017 22nd	Forgiving My Daughter's Killer (2016)	Kate Grosmaire and Nancy French	Kate Rudd and Nick Podehl	Brilliance Audio	Finalist	
2017 22nd	The Great Good Thing (2016)	Andrew Klavan	Andrew Klavan	Thomas Nelson	Finalist	
2017 22nd	Space at the Table (2016)	Brad Harper and Drew Harper	Brad Harper and Drew Harper	Oasis Audio	Finalist	
2018 23rd	Fire Road: The Napalm Girl's Journey Through the Horrors of War to Faith, Forgiveness, and Peace (2017)	Phan Thị Kim Phúc	Emily Woo Zeller	HighBridge Audio	Winner	
2018 23rd	The Mission Walker (2017)	Edie Littlefield Sundby	Jaimee Paul	Thomas Nelson	Finalist	
2018 23rd	Of Mess and Moxie (2017)	Jen Hatmaker	Jen Hatmaker	Thomas Nelson	Finalist	
2018 23rd	The Sacrament of Happy: What a Smiling God Brings to a Wounded World (2017)	Lisa Harper	Lisa Harper	ChristianAudio	Finalist	
2018 23rd	Wake Up to the Joy of You: 52 Meditations and Practices for a Calmer, Happier Life (2016)	Agapi Stassinopoulos	Agapi Stassinopoulos	Random House Audio	Finalist	
2018 23rd	We Stood Upon Stars (2017)	Roger W. Thompson	John McLain	Oasis Audio	Finalist	

== Fiction recipients 2003–2018 ==
=== 2000s ===
Year	Title	Author(s)	Narrator(s)(s)	Publisher	Result	Ref.
2003 8th	Hidden Victory (2011)	Herbert Francis Smith	Richard Ferrone	Recorded Books	Winner	
2003 8th	In This Mountain (2002)	Jan Karon	John McDonough	Penguin Random House Audio	Finalist	
2003 8th	The Christmas Shoes (2001)	Donna VanLiere	Paul Michael	Audio Renaissance	Finalist	
2003 8th	The Remnant (2002)	Tim LaHaye and Jerry B. Jenkins	Richard Ferrone	Recorded Books	Finalist	
2003 8th	The Youngest Hero (2002)	Jerry B. Jenkins	Laurie O'Brien and Jack Sondericker	Time Warner AudioBooks	Finalist	
2004 9th	Treasure of Stonewycke (1995)	Michael Phillips and Judith Pella	Davina Porter	Recorded Books	Winner	
2004 9th	Armageddon (2003)	Tim LaHaye and Jerry B. Jenkins	Richard Ferrone	Recorded Books	Finalist	
2004 9th	Cover Girls (1984)	T. D. Jakes	Pamala Tyson	Time Warner AudioBooks	Finalist	
2004 9th	The Christmas Blessing (2003)	Donna VanLiere	Oliver Wyman	Audio Renaissance	Finalist	
2004 9th	This Far By Faith (2003)	Juan Williams and Quinton Dixie	Lorraine Toussaint	HarperAudio	Finalist	
2005 10th	The Last Battle (1956)	C. S. Lewis	Patrick Stewart	HarperAudio	Winner	
2005 10th	A Delirious Summer (2004)	Ray Blackston	Andrew Peterson	Oasis Audio	Finalist	
2005 10th	The Negotiator (1999)	Dee Henderson	Tom Stechschulte	Recorded Books	Finalist	
2005 10th	Soul Tracker (2004)	Bill Myers	Bill Myers	Zondervan Publishing	Finalist	
2005 10th	The Yada Yada Prayer Group Gets Down (2003)	Neta Jackson	Barbara Rosenblat	Oasis Audio	Finalist	
2006 11th	Grace Will Lead Me Home (2004)	Katherine Valentine	John McDonough	Recorded Books	Winner	
2006 11th	Forgiven (2005)	Karen Kingsbury	Sandra Burr	Brilliance Audio	Finalist	
2006 11th	Just Above a Whisper (2005)	Lori Wick	Barbara Rosenblat	Oasis Audio	Finalist	
2006 11th	Lost in Rooville (2005)	Ray Blackston	Andrew Peterson	Oasis Audio	Finalist	
2006 11th	The Zahir (2005)	Paulo Coelho (trans. Margaret Jull Costa)	Jamie Glover	HarperAudio	Finalist	
2007 12th	The Angels of Morgan Hill (2008)	Donna VanLiere	Donna VanLiere	Audio Renaissance	Winner	
2007 12th	Divine (2006)	Karen Kingsbury	Sharon Williams	Brilliance Audio	Finalist	
2007 12th	Grace at Low Tide (2005)	Beth Webb Hart	Kate Forbes	Recorded Books	Finalist	
2007 12th	Knitting (1977)	Anne Bartlett	Beverley Dunn	Bolinda Audio	Finalist	
2007 12th	The Preacher's Daughter (2005)	Beverly Lewis	Stina Nielson	Recorded Books	Finalist	
2008 13th	River Rising (2005)	Athol Dickson	Dion Graham	Recorded Books	Winner	
2008 13th	Ever After (2006)	Karen Kingsbury	Kathy Garver	Zondervan Publishing	Finalist	
2008 13th	Not Easily Broken (2006)	T. D. Jakes	Tracey Leigh	BBC Audiobooks America	Finalist	
2008 13th	The Penny (2007)	Joyce Meyer and Deborah Bedford	Ellen Archer	Hachette Audio	Finalist	
2008 13th	Renovating Becky Miller (2007)	Sharon Hinck	Johanna Parker	Recorded Books	Finalist	
2009 14th	Prague Counterpoint (1989)	Bodie and Brock Thoene	Sean Barrett	FamilyAudioLibrary.com	Winner	
2009 14th	Adam (2008)	Ted Dekker	Tim Gregory	Oasis Audio	Finalist	
2009 14th	John (2008)	Niall Williams	Nicholas Bell	Bolinda Audio	Finalist	
2009 14th	The Shack (2007)	William P. Young	Roger Mueller	Oasis Audio	Finalist	
2009 14th	The Sisterhood of Blackberry Corner (2006)	Andrea Smith	Lizan Mitchell	Recorded Books	Finalist	

=== 2010s ===
Year	Title	Author(s)	Narrator(s)(s)	Publisher	Result	Ref.
2010 15th	A Month of Summer (2008)	Lisa Wingate	Johanna Parker	Recorded Books	Winner	
2010 15th	Double Minds (2009)	Terri Blackstock	Cassandra Campbell	Zondervan Publishing	Finalist	
2010 15th	Kiss (2009)	Ted Dekker and Erin Healy	Pam Turlow	Oasis Audio	Finalist	
2010 15th	The Shape of Mercy (2008)	Susan Meissner	Tavia Gilbert	ChristianAudio	Finalist	
2010 15th	The Tempest Tales (2008)	Walter Mosley	Ty Jones	Recorded Books	Finalist	
2011 16th	Fireflies in December (2008)	Jennifer Erin Valent	Kate Forbes	Recorded Books	Winner	
2011 16th	Missing Max (2010)	Karen Young	Laural Merlington	Oasis Audio	Finalist	
2011 16th	The Gathering Storm (2010)	Bodie and Brock Thoene	Bodie Thoene	Oasis Audio	Finalist	
2011 16th	Unlocked (2010)	Karen Kingsbury	Roxanne Hernandez	Zondervan Publishing	Finalist	
2011 16th	Edge of Apocalypse (2010)	Tim LaHaye and Craig Parshall	Stefan Rudnicki	Zondervan Publishing	Finalist	
2012 17th	Courageous (2011)	Randy Alcorn	Roger Mueller	Oasis Audio	Winner	
2012 17th	Buddha Standard Time (2011)	Lama Surya Das	Peter Berkrot	Tantor Audio	Finalist	
2012 17th	The Christmas Note (2011)	Donna VanLiere	Donna VanLiere	Macmillan Audio	Finalist	
2012 17th	Lion of Babylon (2011)	David Bunn	Paul Boehmer	ChristianAudio	Finalist	
2012 17th	Resurrection of Nat Turner: The Witnesses (2011)	Sharon Ewell Foster	John McLain	Oasis Audio	Finalist	
2012 17th	Thunder of Heaven (2011)	Tim LaHaye and Craig Parshall	Stefan Rudnicki	Zondervan Publishing	Finalist	
2012 17th	Wonder of Your Love (2011)	Beth Wiseman	Kirsten Potter	ChristianAudio	Finalist	
2013 18th	The Good Dream (2012)	Donna VanLiere	Donna VanLiere	Macmillan Audio	Winner	
2013 18th	Coming Home (2012)	Karen Kingsbury	Stefan Rudnicki and Gabrielle de Cuir	Zondervan	Finalist	
2013 18th	His Love Endures Forever (2012)	Beth Wiseman	Kirsten Potter	eChristian	Finalist	
2013 18th	The Tao of Pooh (1982)	Benjamin Hoff	Simon Vance	Tantor Audio	Finalist	
2013 18th	Touching the Sky (2012)	Tracie Peterson	Renée Raudman	Brilliance Audio	Finalist	
2014 19th	A Story of God and All of Us (2013)	Roma Downey and Mark Burnett	Keith David, Mark Burnett, and Roma Downey	Hachette Audio	Winner	
2014 19th	Icecutter's Daughter (2013)	Tracie Peterson	Stina Nielsen	Recorded Books	Finalist	
2014 19th	Illuminations (2012)	Mary Sharratt	Tavia Gilbert	Tantor Audio	Finalist	
2014 19th	Truth Stained Lies (2012)	Terri Blackstock	Gabrielle de Cuir	Zondervan	Finalist	
2014 19th	Unveiled (2000)	Francine Rivers	Barbara Rosenblat	Recorded Books	Finalist	
2015 20th	The Auschwitz Escape (2014)	Joel C. Rosenberg	Christopher Lane	Brilliance Audio	Winner	
2015 20th	Chasing the Lion (2014)	Nancy Kimball	Joseph Narducci	Nancy Kimball	Finalist	
2015 20th	The Christmas Light (2014)	Donna VanLiere	Donna VanLiere	Macmillan Audio	Finalist	
2015 20th	The First Phone Call from Heaven (2013)	Mitch Albom	Mitch Albom	HarperAudio	Finalist	
2015 20th	Grounded (2014)	Angela Correll	Lyssa Browne	Cedar House Audio Productions	Finalist	
2015 20th	A Sensible Arrangement (2014)	Tracie Peterson	Barbara McCulloh	Recorded Books	Finalist	
2016 21st	To Win Her Favor (2015)	Tamera Alexander	Melba Sibrel	Zondervan Publishing/HarperAudio	Winner	
2016 21st	Come to Me Alive (2014)	Leah Atwood	Pamela Almand	ACX	Finalist	
2016 21st	Her Brother's Keeper (2013)	Beth Wiseman	Clifton Harris	Thomas Nelson/HarperAudio	Finalist	
2016 21st	The Pursuit of Tamsen Littlejohn (2014)	Lori Benton	Kate Forbes	Recorded Books	Finalist	
2016 21st	Secrets She Kept (2015)	Cathy Gohlke	Morgan Hallett and Suzy Jackson	Recorded Books	Finalist	
2017 22nd	Risen (2015)	Angela Hunt	P. J. Ochlan and Alana Kerr Collins	ChristianAudio	Winner	
2017 22nd	Beric the Briton (1893)	G. A. Henty	Brian Blessed, Brian Cox, Tom Baker, Honeysuckle Weeks, John Rhys-Davies, and full cast	Heirloom Audio Productions	Finalist	
2017 22nd	The Christmas Town (2016)	Donna VanLiere	Donna VanLiere	Macmillan Audio	Finalist	
2017 22nd	The Dragon and the Raven (1886)	G. A. Henty	Brian Blessed, John Rhys-Davies, Helen George, Sylvester McCoy, John Bell, and full cast	Heirloom Audio Productions	Finalist	
2017 22nd	The Girl from the Train (2013)	Irma Joubert	Sarah Zimmerman	Thomas Nelson	Finalist	
2017 22nd	Journey's End (2016)	Renee Ryan	Karen Peakes	Brilliance Audio	Finalist	
2018 23rd	Catching the Wind (2017)	Melanie Dobson	Nancy Peterson	Two Words Publishing	Winner	
2018 23rd	Captain Bayley's Heir (1889)	G. A. Henty	Brian Blessed, John Rhys-Davies, Jade Williams, Ian Porter, Finty Williams, David Shaw-Parker, and full cast	Heirloom Audio Productions	Finalist	
2018 23rd	Ebb Tide (2017)	Beverly Lewis	Christina Moore and Stephanie Cozart	Recorded Books	Finalist	
2018 23rd	Sandpiper Cove (2017)	Irene Hannon	Thérèse Plummer	Recorded Books	Finalist	
2018 23rd	The Trials of Saint Patrick (2017)	Paul McCusker	John Rhys-Davies and full cast	Augustine Institute	Finalist	
