= California Mission Walkers =

California based group

The California Mission Walkers (CMW) are a group of historians, hikers, religious pilgrims, enthusiasts dedicated to walking the historic route of the California Missions, spanning from Mission San Diego de Alcalá in the south to Mission San Francisco Solano in the north. This journey, often referred to as the California Mission Walk, follows the approximate route of El Camino Real, a historic roadway connecting the 21 Spanish missions, as well as the presidios and pueblos, established in Alta California during the late 18th and early 19th centuries.

== History ==
The idea of walking the entire California Mission Trail gained popularity in the early 21st century, inspired by the famous pilgrimage routes such as the Camino de Santiago in Spain. Various individuals and groups have undertaken the challenge, with some attempting to follow the original footpaths as closely as possible, while others adapt their routes to modern roads and trails.

The California Mission Walkers organization was founded in November 2013, by a handful of trailblazing mission walkers. As of February 2025, the organization has more than 2,400 members. The motto of the Mission Walkers, Siempre Adelante, is a quote from Saint Junípero Serra, founder of the California Missions. In a letter to his parents in 1749, Serra wrote "¡Siempre adelante! ¡Nunca para atrás!" (Always forward! Never turn back!).

Interest in the Mission Walk has been fueled by historical societies, hiking groups, and scholars who seek to retrace the steps of early Spanish missionaries, indigenous peoples, and settlers who traveled these paths centuries ago. Walkers often document their experiences through blogs, books, and social media.

== Route ==
The full California Mission Walk covers approximately 800 miles and passes through a diverse range of landscapes, including coastal cliffs, rolling hills, urban environments, and agricultural valleys. While there is no single official route, many walkers follow a combination of historic pathways, roads, and trails, often using maps developed by mission historians and walking organizations.

The most common route is found in "California Mission Walk: The Hiker’s Guide to California’s 21 Spanish Missions Along El Camino Real," first published by Ron “Butch” Briery in 2012. The 2nd edition of the book has been expanded and published by the California Mission Walkers in 2022.

Another guidebook, "Hiking and Cycling the California Missions Trail: From Sonoma to San Diego (Pilgrim Route)," was written by Sandy Brown, a member of the California Mission Walkers, and published in 2023.

== Notable missions along the route ==
- Mission San Diego de Alcalá, the first mission, founded in 1769
- Mission San Juan Capistrano, known for its historic ruins and the annual return of the swallows
- Mission San Carlos Borroméo de Carmelo, burial site of Father Junípero Serra, founder of the California missions
- Mission Santa Barbara, nicknamed the "Queen of the Missions" for its beauty
- Mission San Francisco Solano, northernmost and final mission, founded in 1823 under the Mexican government

== Recognition ==
The California Mission Walkers have helped bring widespread attention to the California Mission Trail.

The National Catholic Register has featured the route as the "Serra Walking Pilgrimage," and cites the California Mission Walkers. In another article (which also cites the California Mission Walkers), they list "5 Reasons to Make a Pilgrimage on the California Missions Trail."

The Eternal Word Television Network (EWTN) in the United Kingdom says that "The California Mission Trail is just waiting for the resources to become a significant evangelization tool", and mentions the California Mission Walkers.

The American Association of Retired Persons (AARP) has recognized the mission trail as one of "8 Pilgrimages You Can Make in the United States".

The California Mission Guide states, "The California Mission Walkers are a group of people who have walked (or plan to walk) El Camino Real - the route connecting the 21 California missions. For some, walking the mission trail is a religious pilgrimage. For others, it's a way to explore California's rich history, or simply a way to keep fit and meet like-minded people."

California Catholic Daily calls the mission trail one of California's 5 best pilgrimage routes, and states that the California Mission Walkers "help people walk between the twenty-one California missions".

The California Frontier Project includes the California Mission Walkers among the best "resources for studying, appreciating and teaching about the geography, culture and history of early California".

Aletia, a Christian news organization, featured the California Mission Walkers and the mission trail on their website.

The mission trail is recognized by the California State Parks department, and has been featured in Viator magazine.

The mission walk was also featured by American author Edie Littlefield Sundby in her 2017 book, The Mission Walker, which was a 2018 Audie Award Finalist for Best Inspirational Book.

Completing the 800 mile journey along the mission trail is a significant accomplishment, and is often featured in local news media.

== The walking experience ==
Mission Walkers take on the journey for a variety of reasons, including historical exploration, personal challenge, spiritual reflection, and cultural appreciation. The walk can take one to two months for those completing it in a single journey, while others break it up into sections over several years.

Walkers must navigate a mix of urban streets, highways, and scenic trails, often relying on support from local communities, mission staff, and fellow enthusiasts. Some walkers choose to camp along the way, while others stay in hotels or with hosts who support the mission pilgrimage.

== Legacy and preservation ==
The California Mission Walk serves as both a tribute to California's early history and a call to preserve the remaining portions of El Camino Real. The effort to maintain and restore the original mission pathways continues to grow, with advocacy for signage, trail markers, and historical recognition. A multi-national initiative including leading agencies in both the US and Mexico continues to push for a UNESCO World Heritage Cultural Corridor Nomination for El Camino Real de las Californias.
