= Howard Cutler =

Howard Cutler may refer to:

- Howard C. Cutler, American writer and psychiatrist
- Howard Wright Cutler (1883–1948), American architect
