= The Gate Arts Centre =

Arts centre in Cardiff, Wales

Coordinates: 51.491°N 3.169°W

The logo of the Gate Arts Centre

The Gate Arts Centre (often just referred to as the Gate) is an arts centre and community building located in Keppoch Street, Roath, Cardiff. The Gate is in a Grade II listed building (in what was formerly the Plasnewydd Presbyterian Church) and was opened in September 2004.

== History ==
The Gate is housed in a Grade II listed church building, formerly the Plasnewydd Presbyterian Church and school hall. It is located in Keppoch Street overlooking Plasnewydd Square in the Roath area of Cardiff. The school hall was built in 1886 and the church was added in 1901 to the designs of architect W. Beddoe Rees in collaboration with J. H. James. In a Gothic style, the church has three bays to the front and four bays facing Keppoch Street. A polygonal bell tower is on the street corner. The main body of the church had (and still has) galleries on three sides, supported by iron columns with classical capitals. The building was received a heritage listing of Grade II in 1998, being a prominent, finely detailed church by an important architect.

The Gate centre was purchased in 2000 and underwent a four-year redevelopment with the aid of £1.2M from the Heritage Lottery Fund, £1.2M from a private individual and £400,000 from the Welsh Assembly Government. After four years of planning and refurbishment under the guidance of architect Rob Cruwys, it opened its doors in September 2004.

The BBC television programme Songs of Praise was filmed here and broadcast on 14 May 2006.

== Founders ==
The centre was founded by religious author, Rob Lacey (d. 2006), and his wife Sandra Harnich-Lacey.

== Facilities ==
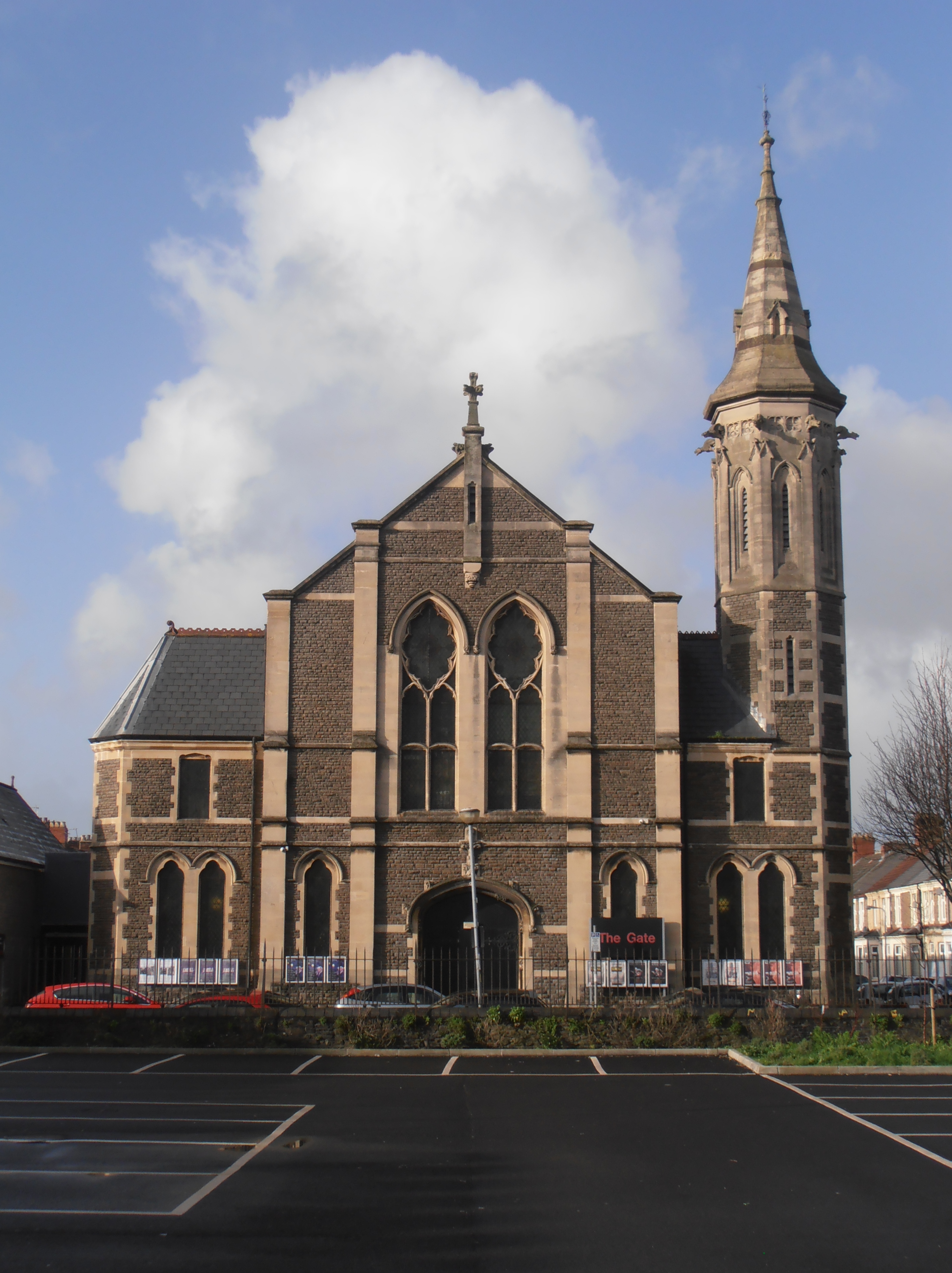
The Gate Arts Centre

After four years of planning and refurbishment under the guidance of architect Rob Cruwys, it opened the Gate doors in September 2004.

The Grand Theatre, formerly an upper section of the church, is a performance space seating up to 350 on the original wooden pews and a raked gallery floor.

The Dance Studio features the original carved pulpit and elaborate columns.

The Gate has two Exhibition Galleries, the first in the original front entrance to the church with a glazed screen and curved pew, the other in a corridor against the original exterior south stone wall.

A cafe bar has been formed in the original schoolroom, the oldest part of the building dating back to 1896.

Other spaces available include an auditorium in which visiting theatre and musical groups are able to perform.

== Workshops and classes ==
Throughout the week a variety of courses and workshops are held at the centre ranging from dance to creative writing. See The Gate Arts Centre Weekly Classes

The Gate Arts Centre also offers drama classes. The theatre is often used for performances and plays. The Saturday morning theatre group, Performers, uses the venue regularly and uses the upstairs theatre for its performances.
