= Flag (TV series) =

Japanese anime television series

- Official North American DVD cover of Flag
- Genre: Mecha, military
- Created by: Ryōsuke Takahashi; Team Flag
- Anime television series
- Directed by: Ryōsuke Takahashi (Chief); Kazuo Terada
- Produced by: Yū Takahashi; Haruhisa Yamaji
- Written by: Tooru Nozaki
- Music by: Yoshihiro Ike
- Studio: The Answer Studio
- Licensed by: NA: Bandai Namco Filmworks
- Original network: Bandai Channel
- Original run: June 16, 2006 – March 2, 2007
- Episodes: 13

Flag (stylized in all caps) is a 13-episode Japanese mecha-genre anime television series created and directed by veteran director Ryōsuke Takahashi. It was broadcast as pay per view streaming web video on Bandai Channel starting on June 6, 2006. Episodes 1 and 2 were scheduled to be broadcast on the anime PPV channel SKY Perfect Perfect Choice ch. 160 Anime from August 18, 2006. Stylistically, the series makes use of a still and video cameraman POV, as well as "web cam" images, to create a documentary-like narrative, despite being an animated drama. Character design is by Kazuyoshi Takeuchi and mecha design is by Kazutaka Miyatake.

== Setting ==
Saeko Shirasu is a 25-year-old war front-line photo-journalist who became a celebrity after taking a picture of civilians raising a makeshift UN flag in war-torn Uddiyana. The image then became an instant symbol for peace. However, just before the peace agreement is achieved, the flag was stolen by an armed extremist group in order to obstruct the truce. The UN peacekeepers decide to covertly send in a SDC (pronounced as "Seedac"—Special Development Command) unit to retrieve the flag. Because of her connection with the "Flag" photo, Saeko Shirasu was offered the job of following the SDC unit as a front line journalist. Among the SDC unit's equipment is the HAVWC (High Agility Versatile Weapon Carrier—pronounced "havoc") mecha armored vehicle.

== Characters ==
Shirasu's Front

- Saeko Shirasu, Voiced by: Rena Tanaka (Japanese); Dorothy Elias-Fahn (English), 25-year-old frontline war photo-journalist
- SDC Unit
  - Capt. Chris Eversalt, Voiced by: Narumi Hidaka (Japanese); Cindy Robinson (English), female commanding officer of the SDC unit, HAVWC mecha pilot
  - 2nd Lt. Nadi Olowokandi, Voiced by: Takashi Nagasako (Japanese); Michael Sorich (English), transport and scout helicopter pilot
  - 2nd Lt. Hakan Aqbal, Voiced by: Yūko Satō (Japanese); Kirsten Potter (English), transport helicopter pilot
  - 1st Lt. Rowell Su-Ming, Voiced by: Yū Asakawa (Japanese); Karen Strassman (English), intelligence officer
  - 1st Lt. Jan Nikkanen, Voiced by: Kenji Nomura (Japanese); Paul St. Peter (English), back-up pilot and intelligence support officer
  - 1st Lt. Christian Beroqui, Voiced by: Hiroshi Iwasaki (Japanese); Christopher Corey Smith (English), engineer and mechanic, technical support
  - 1st Lt. Shin Ichiyanagi, Voiced by: Shinji Kawada (Japanese); Erik Davies (English), HAVWC mecha pilot

Akagi's Front

- Keiichi Akagi, Voiced by: Unshō Ishizuka (Japanese); Jamieson Price (English), Saeko's senpai senior and friend. Veteran cameraman working for the photo agency "Horizont".
- Lisa, Voiced by: Sanae Kobayashi (Japanese); Mela Lee (English), fellow journalist
- Naraya, Voiced by: Shirō Saitō (Japanese); David Lodge (English), Akagi's local informant

== Episodes ==
No.	Title	Original release date
1	"Flag"; Transliteration: "Furaggu" (Japanese: フラッグ)	June 16, 2006
An armed extremist faction had stolen the flag, which was previously seen as the symbol of peace that triggered the cease-fire initiative between armed factions and the government forces in Uddiyana. The UN secretly dispatched an SDC unit to retrieve the flag. Saeko Shirasu was assigned as the embedded reporter.
2	"Portrait"; Transliteration: "Pōtorēto" (Japanese: ポートレート)	June 30, 2006
Saeko started her reporting inside the SDC secret base. However, Captain Chris denied Saeko's request to follow any military operations involving the use of HAVWC. Saeko tried to capture the soldiers on camera as they returned to base.
3	"Frontline Reporting"; Transliteration: "Dōkō Shuzai" (Japanese: 同行取材)	July 14, 2006
The SDC unit is planning scouting missions in area where the FLAG was believed to be hidden. Once again Saeko's request to accompany the unit was denied. Nadi Olowokandi offered his helping hand.
4	"The Night of New Moon"; Transliteration: "Shingetsu no Yoru" (Japanese: 新月の夜)	July 28, 2006
It was established that the defence capabilities of the armed faction base were much stronger than expected. The SDAC unit decided to launch an operation to retrieve the Flag on the night of the new moon. Preparation of the HAVWC mecha, the key element of the operation, became a race against time, and Saeko spent all night covering the activities of the unit. Meanwhile on the same night, as reporter Akagi was pursuing a young girl, a reincarnate of the goddess Kuhura.
5	"Parabola of Darkness"; Transliteration: "Kurayami no Sōkyokusen" (Japanese: 暗闇の双曲線)	August 11, 2006
On the night of the new moon, the SDC unit began its campaign to retrieve the flag and was heading towards the "Ruins", the armed faction's stronghold. Shirasu witnessed the crossfire while accompanying the unit. At the same time, the journalists, suspicious of the UN forces, found out about the UN's plan to bomb the city. Akagi had some idea where the target of the bombing would be.
6	"Light in Darkness"; Transliteration: "Yami no Naka no Hikari" (Japanese: 闇の中の光)	August 25, 2006
Ichiyanagi stormed into the armed faction's stronghold to retrieve the flag. As the team were following the IC tag signal, something unexpected was waiting for them. They discovered the conspiracy to hinder the ceasefire. Facing return attack from the enemy and with nowhere to retreat, he attempted to break through.
7	"Reactivation"; Transliteration: "Saishidō" (Japanese: 再始動)	January 12, 2007
UN forces block access to the bombarded parts of the city and stonewall at the daily press conference, trying to cover up the incident. SDC researches how the flag's military grade IC encryption could have been broken and faked. In that course, more questions are raised. The UN started to move in more weapons into the country in secret, and attacked another target 400 km away without telling the public. This increases doubt on the official narrative in which the temple faction is the only violent actor.
8	"XR-2 Longku"; Transliteration: "Ikkusuāru-Tsū Ronkū" (Japanese: XR-2 ロンクー)	January 19, 2007
A replacement for the HAVWC mecha lost in the attack of the temple arrives, but training it to accept Ichiyanagi as pilot makes only slow progress. An unknown power penetrates the training camp's perimeter with three helicopters and the prototype of a Chinese XR-2 mecha. Ichiyanagi and Eversalt fight off the intruders in their mechas. This is considered a warning to the SDC, and complicates the situation because obviously a powerful member of the UN security council entered the playing field.
9	"Yurts and the Land"; Transliteration: "Geru to Taichi" (Japanese: ゲルと大地)	January 26, 2007
Shirasu spends a day and a night with the indigenous nomads. She assists their medical doctor, who was trained in both native and western medicine, with house visits and learns about the way of life of those people. Olowokandi is interrogated. The flow of news from the UNF to journalists comes to a grinding halt. Highly increased reconnaissance flight activity hints at a brewing political and military storm.
10	"SDAC + 1"; Transliteration: "Shīdakku Purasu Wan" (Japanese: シーダック+1)	February 9, 2007
Investigators from UN HQ are sent to SDC, blocking their activity. In the background of a picture of the temple's leader, the flag is spotted. Eversalt, backed by the complete SDC team, decides to ignore orders and launch a fact-finding mission into the temple. Ichiyanagi is freed from investigative detention so he can pilot a smaller mecha model he was involved in developing. One member of the investigators, only named Chief, backs the operation by delaying information sent to HQ. Shirasu is instructed by Eversalt to document the operation, for a possible future court martial trial. SDC intrudes the temple and finds the flag, but fails to capture it. Meanwhile, the temple's masked soldiers supported by improvised tanks and a mecha of unknown origin capture UNF's headquarters in a surprise attack and hold staff hostage.
11	"Reunion through the Viewfinder"; Transliteration: "Faindā-goshi no Saikai" (Japanese: ファインダーごしの再会)	February 16, 2007
SDC decides to launch a counterattack to take UNF HQ back using their two HAVWC mechas. The operation succeeds because in the last minute massive reinforcement by regular UNF troops arrives. Akagi and Shirasu have eye contact for the first time since she was deployed as an embedded journalist with SDC. Akagi films her in a helicopter labeled with the SDC logo.
12	"Recapture the Flag"; Transliteration: "Furaggu Dakkan" (Japanese: フラッグ奪回)	February 23, 2007
The temple leader, in front of the flag, calls for violence and nation-wide the insurgency flares up. SDC embarks on the mission to finally capture the flag. The two HAVWC mechas successfully infiltrate the temple by force, but its masked soldiers manage to escape with the flag seconds before capture. A fierce battle between SDC and temple forces supported by helicopters and their mecha takes place. Eventually SDC prevails, with Shirasu capturing the moment one of the mechas can get its hand on the flag in another iconic photo. Akagi films that scene. Shirasu is arrested by UNF troops on the battlefield.
13	"Into the Light"; Transliteration: "Hikari no Naka e" (Japanese: 光の中へ)	March 2, 2007
At Shirasu's release, she is told by an official that her photos will be withheld for censorship because they include footage inconvenient for the UN. She's told she'll never see any SDC team member again and given a last letter from Eversalt. It contains her lucky charm, which she had lost during the battle. At home, she discovers an SD card with her uncensored photo material in it. An accompanying video by the SDC members bids her a heartfelt farewell and encourages her to publish the truth. The peace agreement signatory ceremony takes places as planned under the flag. Shirasu and Akagi spend a carefree week in the now peaceful city. Shirasu leaves a copy of her photos for Akagi at the hotel's desk. Then she departs for Tokyo, but is killed in a terrorist bomb attack at the airport. In an epilogue, a devastated Akagi meets Lisa in a Tokyo bar, talking about the events. Lisa asks whether she could see Shirasu's photos and Akagi tells her he's currently editing the material for release.
