= Kirsten Potter =

American voice actress

- Other name: Alison James
- Education: Boston University
- Occupations: Voice actress; actress; narrator
- Years active: 1996–present

Kirsten Potter is an American voice actress and narrator. She is best known for voicing characters in English-language dubs of Japanese, including anime and video games. She has provided voice work in video games franchises such as Supreme Commander: Forged Alliance, Catherine, Silent Hill: Shattered Memories, Fallout: New Vegas, Warhammer 40,000: Dawn of War II – Retribution, Persona 5 and Destiny 2: The Witch Queen.

== Early life and education ==
Kirsten Potter graduated from the School for the Arts at Boston University, and she also performed on film, stage and television.

== Career ==
She made her debut in Mad Bull 34 as Nancy Moore which was dubbed in English by Manga Entertainment. In her early voice acting career, she used the name, Alison James, as a pseudonym. She is associated with for New Generation Pictures, Studiopolis, Bang Zoom! Entertainment, PCB Productions and Animaze.

Potter has also narrated several audiobooks.

== Filmography ==
=== Television series ===
List of acting performances in television series
Year	Title	Role	Notes
2004	Judging Amy	Harriet Blanchard	Episode: "Early Winters"
2006	Bones	Mary Corbis	Episode: "Mother and Child in the Bay"
2007	Medium	Young Woman	Episode: "We Had a Dream"

=== Anime series ===
List of English dubbing performances in anime series
Year	Title	Role	Notes
1996	Mad Bull 34	Nancy Moore	English version
2000	Boys Be...	Chiharu Reicha	
2003	Rumic Theater	Hanako	
2003	Blame!	Female Voices	
2004	Daphne in the Brilliant Blue	May / Mitstue Takahashi / Mitsue Takahashi	
2004	DearS	Harumi Ikhuhara	
2004	Melody of Oblivion	Hecate / Waitress / Tamakorogashi	
2005	MÄR	Princess of Reginleif	
2006	Naruto	Natsuhi	
2006	Bleach	Ran'Taro	
2006	Ergo Proxy	Kristeva / Guest 1	
2007	Flag	Hakan Aqbal	
2007	The Third	Fila Marique	English version
2008	Tweeny Witches	Nerabu / Goddess / Witch	Media Blasters dub
2008	Higurashi When They Cry	Rina Mamiya	Sentai Filmworks dub
2009	Monster	Barbara Mueller	
2010	Marvel Anime	Maria / Additional voices	
2010	Gun Sword	Elle	
2011	Iron Man	Maria / Computer	

=== Animation series ===
List of voice performances in animation series
Year	Title	Role	Notes
2012	The Avengers: Earth's Mightiest Heroes	Lucia von Bardas	

=== Film ===
List of voice performances in direct-to-video and films
Year	Title	Role	Notes
2003	Naruto: The Lost Story - Mission: Protect the Waterfall Village	Hisame	
2007	The Eyes Have It	Lauren Gillis	Short
2008	The Sky Crawlers	Fuko	
2009	Tweeny Witches: The Adventures	Ice Witch	English version
2016	24 Hours of Reality: The Road Forward	Kirsten	Voice

=== Audiobooks ===
List of voice performances in audiobooks
Year	Title	Role	Notes
2009	If I Stay	Narrator	Audiobook
2017	Beauty Like The Night	Narrator	Audiobook
2021	The Segonian	Narrator	Audiobook
2024	'How Cheerleading Became So Acrobatic, Dangerous and Popular	Narrator	Audiobook
2025	Chronic Pain Is a Hidden Epidemic. It's Time for a Revolution	Narrator	Audiobook

=== Video games ===
List of voice performances in video games
Year	Title	Role	Notes
1999	Valkyrie Profile	Freya	PlayStation Portable
2006	Ar Tonelico: Melody of Elemia	Mir	PlayStation 2
2006	Growlanser: Heritage of War	Elessa	English version
2006	Dungeon Siege: Throne of Agony	Malith	PlayStation Portable
2006	Trauma Center: Second Opinion	Naomi Kimishima / Mary Fulton	Wii
2007	Ar Tonelico 2	Reisha Trulyworth	PlayStation 2
2007	Supreme Commander	Princess Rhianne Burke	Xbox 360
2007	Final Fantasy Fables: Chocobo's Dungeon	Charlotte / Stella	Wii
2007	Supreme Commander: Forged Alliance	Princess Rhianne Burke	PC
2007	Monster Kingdom: Jewel Summoner	Lynn / Shopkeeper	PlayStation Portable
2008	The Last Remnant	Enemies / Civilians	Xbox 360
2008	Mana Khemia 2: Fall of Alchemy	Mayarika / Tetri	PlayStation 2
2008	Valkyrie Profile: Covenant of the Plume	Freya	Nintendo DS
2009	Shin Megami Tensei: Persona	Yukino Mayuzumi	PlayStation Portable
2009	Red Faction: Guerrilla	EDF Soldiers / Civilians / Hostages	PlayStation 3
2009	League of Legends	Caitlyn (Classic) / Caitlyn (Rework) / Pulsefire Caitlyn / Battle Academia Caitlyn	OS X
2009	Silent Hill: Shattered Memories	Cybil Bennett	PlayStation 2
2010	Supreme Commander 2	Princess Rhianne Burke	Xbox 360
2010	Trauma Team	Naomi Kimishima	Wii
2010	Fallout: New Vegas	Col. Moore	PlayStation 3
2011	Catherine	Anna Rosmont / Upbeat Woman / Kappa Heaven Wife 1 / Kappa Heaven Wife 2 / Succubus 1 / Succubus 2 / Succubus 3	English version
2011	Warhammer 40,000: Dawn of War II – Retribution	Inquisitor Adrastia	PC
2011	Red Faction: Armageddon	Additional voices	Xbox 360
2011	Saints Row: The Third	Pedestrian and Character Voices	PlayStation 3
2012	Soulcalibur V	Veteran Knight (Female) (Original Characters)	Xbox 360
2012	Kingdoms of Amalur: Reckoning	General Tilera	Xbox 360
2012	Guild Wars 2	Blackfeather / Sigrun	PC
2013	State of Decay	Judge Lawton	Xbox 360
2014	Destiny	The Queen	PlayStation 4
2016	Guild Wars 2: Heart of Thorns	Eagle Flight / Elder Shaman Aukje	OS X
2016	Persona 5	Tae Takemi	PlayStation 3/ Playstation 4
2017	Destiny 2	NPC Female / Female Extras / Mara Sov	PlayStation 5
2018	Destiny 2: Forsaken	Mara Sov	PlayStation 5
2018	Soulcalibur VI	Veteran Knight	Xbox One
2019	Persona 5 Royal	Tae Takemi (Note: According to Laura Post that Kirsten Potter was replaced by Abby Trott as Tae Takemi in the English dub of Royal because Potter had moved away and couldn't reprise her role but some of Takemi's lines in the final battle of Royal was voiced by Kirsten Potter.)	PlayStation 4
2019	Crackdown 3	Elizabeth Niemand	PC
2019	Catherine: Full Body	Upbeat Woman / Kappa Heaven Wife 1 / Kappa Heaven Wife 2 / Succubus 1 / Succubus 2 / Succubus 3	PlayStation 5
2019	Golem	River	PlayStation 4
2020	Legends of Runeterra	Caitlyn	PC
2020	Destiny 2: Beyond Light	Mara Sov	PlayStation 5
2022	Destiny 2: The Witch Queen	Mara Sov	PlayStation 4
2023	Destiny 2: Lightfall	Mara Sov	PlayStation 4
2024	Destiny 2: The Final Shape	Luzaku / Mara Sov	PlayStation 5
2025	Borderlands 4	Zadra	PlayStation 5

== Awards and nominations ==
Year	Award	Category	Result	Title	Ref.
2012	17th Audie Awards	Audie Award for Short Stories or Collections	Nominated	The Yellow Wallpaper	
2013	18th Audie Awards	Audie Award for Thriller or Suspense	Nominated	Rise Again	
2013	18th Audie Awards	Audie Award for Faith-Based Fiction and Nonfiction	Nominated	His Love Endures Forever	
2013	18th Audie Awards	Audie Award for Romance	Nominated	Never Seduce a Scot	
2016	21st Audie Awards	Audie Award for Romance	Nominated	A Sorceress of His Own	
2017	Earphones Awards	Best Narrator	Won	Beauty Like the Night	
2021	Earphones Awards	Best Narrator	Won	The Sundial	
