= Your Big Family Renovation =

- Also known as: My Big Family Renovation
- Genre: Real estate
- Country of origin: United States
- No. of seasons: 2
- No. of episodes: 9

Production
- Running time: 22 minutes

Original release
- Network: HGTV
- Release: August 7, 2014 – March 3, 2015

Your Big Family Renovation is an American reality television series that debuted on HGTV, on March 3, 2015, and aired for two seasons. It was hosted by Brandon and Jen Hatmaker before their 2020 divorce, and centered upon them showing homes which have potential to large and growing families. The Hatmakers, after the family decided on their home, worked with their contractors on fixing and revitalizing the homes.

== Original series ==
In June, 2014, one of Hatmaker's blog posts went viral when she ranted, humorously, about the burnout many parents experience at the end of the school year. NBC's The Today Show interviewed Hatmaker in a segment where she joked "we all care about our kids, we all care about education, but honestly, somewhere around end of April, early May, we’re kind of over it.” After the interview was broadcast, HGTV contacted Hatmaker to discuss a possible series featuring her family.

Hatmaker discussed her family's religious lifestyle with the channel. HGTV did not have an objection; their family fit a "quirky wholesome category" that had found success with Duck Dynasty and 19 Kids and Counting. The Hatmakers starred in the 8-episode series in the summer of 2014. Hatmaker discussed the positive impact of being in a reality series on her blog. She called her family dynamics "wobbly" prior to filming due to the strains of the travel her career demanded and praised the experience of "working side-by-side together all day, every day."

== Spin off ==
After the success of My Big Family Renovation HGTV picked up the spin off show Your Big Family Renovation. In this show the Hatmakers help other big families with their housing issues due to lack of space. They spend the next several weeks renovating the homes and ensuring the families utilize their new home to its full potential.

== Episodes ==
=== My Big Family Renovation ===
No.	Title	Original release date	U.S. viewers (millions)	Rating/share (18–49)
1	"The Big Move"	August 7, 2014	N/A	TBA
The Hatmakers search for a home in Buda, Texas.
2	"First Floor Fixes"	August 7, 2014	N/A	TBA
The Hatmakers begin demoing their lower level and build out their dining room.
3	"Attic Transformation"	August 14, 2014	N/A	TBA
The Hatmakers make bedrooms for 3 of their kids in what used to be the attic.
4	"Industrial Farmhouse Kitchen"	August 14, 2014	N/A	TBA
The Hatmakers build out their new kitchen.
5	"Playground Bedroom/Entry Bath"	August 21, 2014	N/A	TBA
The Hatmakers build their downstairs bedroom and entry bathroom
6	"Heart of the Home"	August 21, 2014	N/A	TBA
The Hatmakers build their ideal living room and entryway.
7	"Retreat for Mom and Dad"	August 28, 2014	N/A	TBA
The Hatmakers build their own new master bedroom suite.
8	"Backyard Haven"	August 28, 2014	N/A	TBA
Having finalized the inside of the house, The Hatmakers redo their backyard.

=== Your Big Family Renovations ===
No.	Title	Original release date	U.S. viewers (millions)	Rating/share (18–49)
1	"The Big Move"	March 3, 2015	N/A	TBA
The Hatmakers help a family of 5, with twins on the way, find and renovate their new home.
