= Jennifer Rosner =

American philosopher

- Spouse: William J. Corwin
- Children: Juliet, Sophia

Education
- Education: Columbia University (BA), Stanford University (PhD)

Philosophical work
- Era: 21st-century philosophy
- Region: Western philosophy
- Institutions: Mount Holyoke College
- Website: https://www.jennifer-rosner.com/

Jennifer A. Rosner is an American author and philosopher who has taught at Mount Holyoke College. Her first novel The Yellow Bird Sings was a National Jewish Book Award Finalist and a Massachusetts Book Award Honor Book. Her book The Mitten String was a Sydney Taylor Book Award Notable. Her book Once We Were Home was an Audie Award for Faith-Based Fiction and Nonfiction Finalist.

== Books ==
- Once We Were Home
- The Yellow Bird Sings
- If A Tree Falls
- The Mitten String
- The Candlewick
- The Messy Self
