= Susan Trott =

American writer (born 1937)

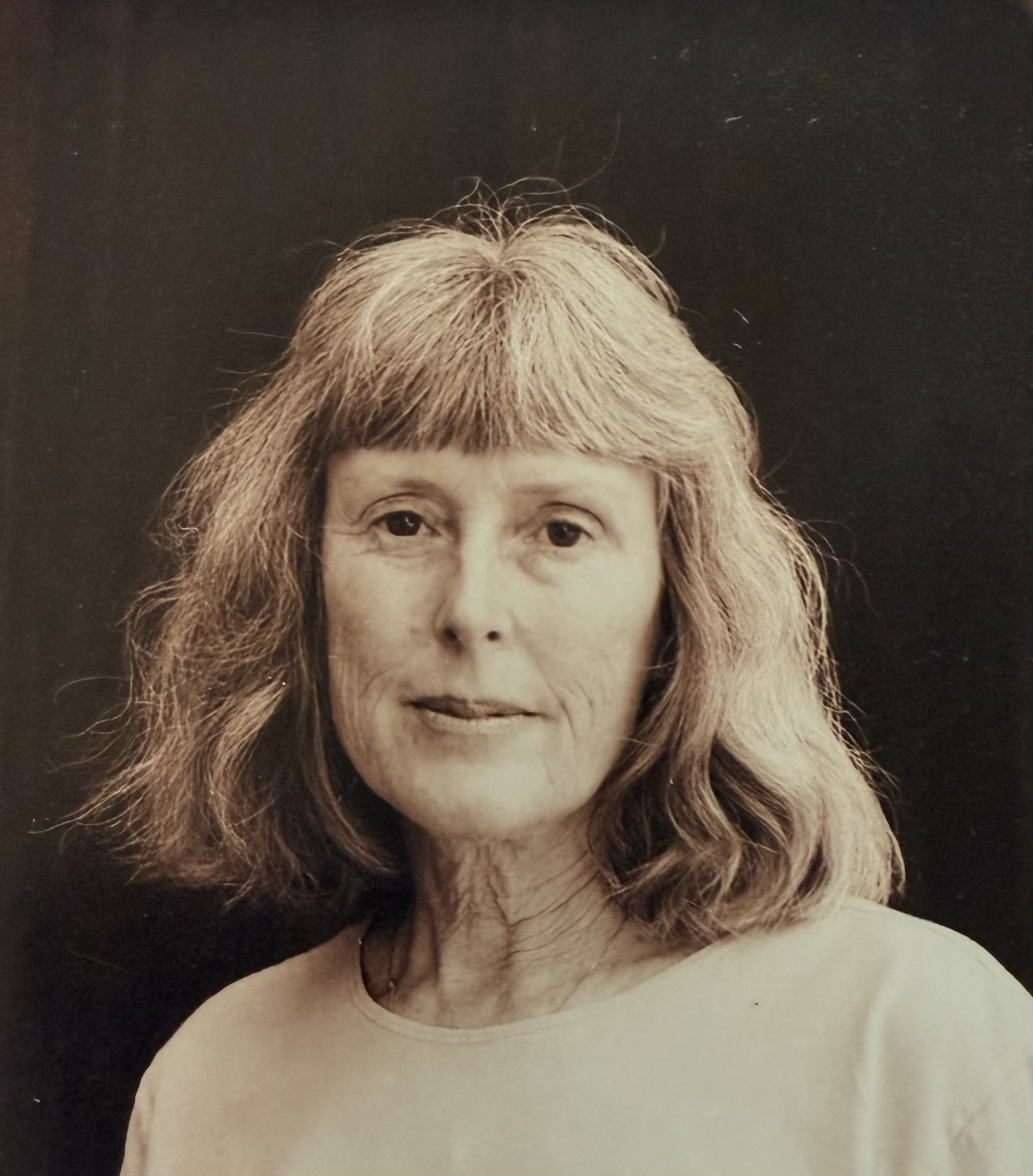
- Susan Trott in 1990
- Born: July 4, 1937 (age 89); Lawrence, Massachusetts
- Occupation: Writer
- Website: susantrottart.com

Susan Trott (born July 4, 1937) is an American writer known for her novels and short stories across themes of family drama and adventure.

== Early life and education ==
Trott was born in Lawrence, Massachusetts to Emma and Emery Trott. In the mid 1950s, she dropped out of Bennington College to pursue writing full time.

== Career ==
In 1965, Susan Trott began publishing short stories and literary reviews in magazines including Mademoiselle, Cosmopolitan, Redbook, and The Magazine of Fantasy & Science Fiction.

Trott published her first novel, Mr. Privacy, in 1972. This first children's novel was followed by three more: Sea Serpent of Horse (1973), Mudfight Diamond (1975), and Monster Music (1977).

She published her first adult novel, The Housewife and the Assassin, in 1979. This was followed by several novels published between 1980 and 2023. Her U.S. national bestselling book, The Holy Man, was published in 1995. In 2017, it was dramatized, along with Holy Man's Journey, by Audible London under the title, The Man on the Mountain Top. Several of her novels have been optioned in Hollywood, including When Your Lover Leaves, which was adapted into a screenplay of the same name in 1983.

Trott continued publishing short stories and essays with The New York Times in the 1990s. She taught writing at the Community of Writers at Squaw Valley in 1994, 1996 and 1998 and at Saint Mary's College of California in 2001.

In addition to writing, Trott's paintings have been shown at the Marin Society of Artists, The Falkirk Cultural Center, San Rafael Artisans Gallery, Claudia Chapline Gallery, Belvedere-Tiburon Library, and the S.F Bank of America Concourse Gallery.

== Bibliography ==
=== Children’s literature ===
- Trott, Susan (1972). Mr. Privacy. Atlantic-Little Brown Books. ISBN 9780316853002.
- Trott, Susan (1973). Sea Serpent of Horse. Atlantic-Little Brown Books. ISBN 9780316853019.
- Trott, Susan (1975). Mudfight Diamond. Solo Books, Macmillan Publishing Company.
- Trott, Susan (1977). Monster Music. Marin Symphony Association.

=== Novels ===
- Trott, Susan (1979). The Housewife and the Assassin. New York: St. Martin’s Press. ISBN 9780060971182.
- Trott, Susan (1980). When Your Lover Leaves. New York: St. Martin’s Press.
- Trott, Susan (1983). Incognito. London: Severn House. ISBN 9780060971069.
- Trott, Susan (1984). Don’t Tell Laura. London: Severn House. ISBN 9780060971052.
- Trott, Susan (1987). Sightings. New York: Simon and Schuster. ISBN 9780671638047.
- Trott, Susan (1988). Pursued by the Crooked Man. Harper & Row.
- Trott, Susan (1990). The Exception. New York: Carrol and Graf. ISBN 9780881846263.
- Trott, Susan (1992). Divorcing Daddy. New York: Carroll and Graf. ISBN 9780881847543.
- Trott, Susan (1995). The Holy Man. New York: Riverhead Books.
- Trott, Susan (1997). The Holy Man's Journey. Riverhead. ISBN 1-57322-057-4.
- Trott, Susan (1998). Crane Spreads Wings, A Bigamist’s Story. New York: Doubleday. ISBN 0-385-49234-0.
- Trott, Susan (2009). The Holy Woman. Denver, Colorado: Outskirts Press. ISBN 9781573220026.
- Trott, Susan (2010). Flamingo Thief. LuluBooks.
- Trott, Susan (2023). Running at Eighty. Saint Helena: Go Fish Publishing.
  - In Italian, translated by Elena Campominosi: Il Santo, 1996, Corbaccio, Milano and Il Viaggio del Santo, 1998, Corbacico Milano
