= The Soul of a Butterfly =

2003 autobiography by Muhammad Ali

The Soul of a Butterfly: Reflections on Life's Journey
- First edition
- Author: Muhammad Ali; Hana Yasmeen Ali
- Language: English
- Genre: Autobiography, Memoir
- Publisher: Simon & Schuster
- Publication date: November 16, 2003
- Pages: 256
- ISBN: 978-0-7432-5569-1

The Soul of a Butterfly (2003) is the autobiography of Muhammad Ali, born Cassius Marcellus Clay Jr., a former heavyweight boxer who was a three-time World Heavyweight Champion and is considered by many to be the greatest heavyweight boxer of all time.

Written with the assistance of his daughter Hana Yasmeen Ali, Muhammad Ali reflects on elements of his life, and shares his beliefs, including, but not limited to, respect, integrity, courage, faith, etc. Ali extensively reflects on his faith in God and the strength it gave him during his greatest challenges. It is not seen as a comprehensive autobiography, but a breakdown of the important events and experiences in his life; this is suggested in the book's subtitle, Reflections on Life's Journey.

The book includes some of his and his daughter's poetry, and snippets of Sufi thought. A chapter of the book is written solely by his daughter Hana, where she recounts an experience with her father, and goes on to reflect upon what she means to him and what she has learned from him.

A review in The New York Times describes the book as "an elliptical, collagelike memoir that offered a philosophical look back at his life."
