= Anthony DeStefano =

American writer (born 1965)

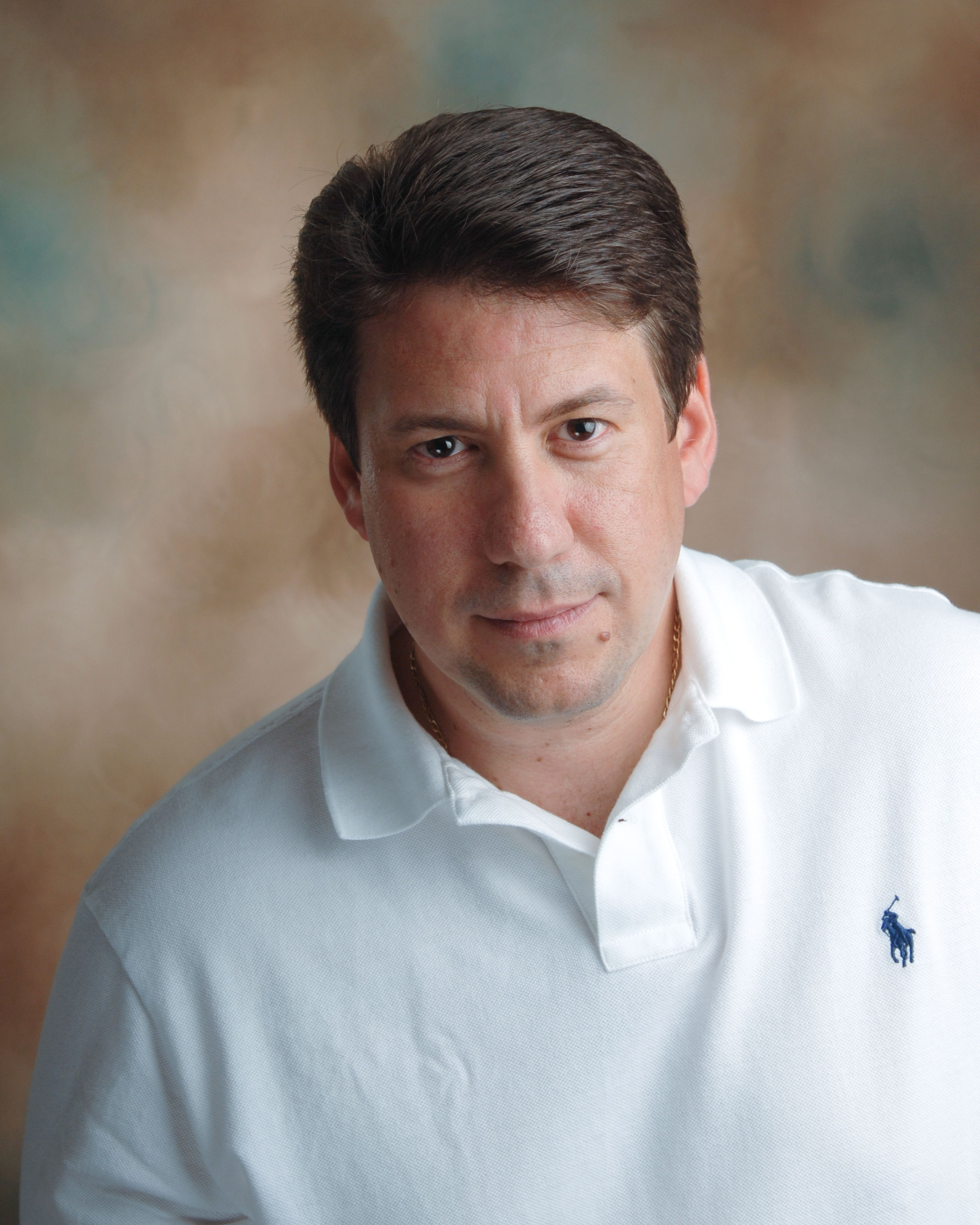
- Born: Anthony DeStefano; 1965 (age 60–61); Brooklyn, New York City, US
- Occupation: Author
- Writing career
- Period: 2003–present
- Genre: Christian Literature
- Website: anthonydestefano.com

Anthony DeStefano (born September 1965) is an American author of Christian books for adults and children.

DeStefano’s first book, A Travel Guide to Heaven, was published in 18 countries. His second book, Ten Prayers God Always Says Yes To, was endorsed by the National Day of Prayer Task Force.

Writing in World magazine, Gene Edward Veith said: "DeStefano is a Roman Catholic…but he tries to stick to what all Christians would affirm, with nearly as many evangelical sources in his bibliography as Catholic ones". Regarding DeStefano's children's books, Maura Grunlund, writing in the Staten Island Advance, said: "Weak characters who find strength are a favorite theme of the author, who explored the concept in his first children's book, Little Star".

In 2015, DeStefano hosted a 5-part miniseries called: A Travel Guide to Heaven, based on his book of that title, on the Eternal Word Television Network (EWTN).

== Books ==
- A Travel Guide to Heaven, Doubleday, 2003. ISBN 978-0385509893
- Ten Prayers God Always Says Yes To: Divine Answers to Life’s Most Difficult Problems, Image, 2007. ISBN 978-0385509916
- Angels All Around Us: A Sightseeing Guide to the Invisible World, Image, 2011. ISBN 978-0385522229
- A Travel Guide to Life: Transforming Yourself from Head to Soul, Faith Words, 2014. ISBN 978-1455521029
- Inside the Atheist Mind: Unmasking the Religion of Those Who Say There is No God, Thomas Nelson, 2019. ISBN 978-1400208241
- Hell: A Guide, Thomas Nelson, 2020. ISBN 978-0718080617
- Little Star, Harvest House, 2013. ISBN 978-0736958592
- This Little Prayer of Mine, Harvest House, 2014. ISBN 978-0736958615
- A Travel Guide to Heaven for Kids, Harvest House, 2013. ISBN 978-0736955096
- The Sheep That No One Could Find, Harvest House, 2014. ISBN 978-0736956116
- The Puppy That No One Wanted, Servant Books, 2015. ISBN 978-0736966344
- Roxy the Ritzy Camel, Harvest House, 2016. ISBN 978-0736966344
- The Miracle of the Bread, the Fish and the Boy, Harvest House, 2018. ISBN 978-0736968591
- The Seed Who Was Afraid to Be Planted, Sophia Institute Press, 2019. ISBN 978-1622828289
- The Grumpy Old Ox, Sophia Institute Press, 2020. ISBN 978-1644131787
- Our Lady’s Wardrobe, Sophia Institute Press, 2020. ISBN 978-1622826261
- Our Lady’s Picture Book, Sophia Institute Press, 2021. ISBN 978-1644133903
- I Just Can’t Take it Anymore! Encouragement When Life Gets You Down, Harvest House, 2012. ISBN 978-0736948548
- Ok I Admit it, I’m Afraid: Finding the Courage to Overcome Life’s Problems, Harvest House, 2015. ISBN 978-0736964715
- The Love Book: A Simple Guide to the Most Abused, Confused, and Misused Word in the English Language, Harvest House, 2016. ISBN 978-0736964739
- Why Am I Here Anyway? The Simple Answer to Life’s Biggest Question, Harvest House, 2017. ISBN 978-0736964692
- All This and Heaven Too! Thanking God for the Gift of Life, Harvest House, 2019. ISBN 978-0736964753
