= Bodie and Brock Thoene =

American husband-and-wife writers of religious-themed novels

- Born: Brock: 1952 (age 73–74); Bodie: 1951 (age 74–75); Bakersfield, California, U.S.
- Occupation: Authors
- Children: 4
- Writing career
- Genres: Historical fiction Christian fiction
- Notable awards: Gold Medallion Award
- Website: www.thoenebooks.com

Bodie (born 1951) and Brock Thoene (born 1952; pronounced Tay-nee) are an American husband-and-wife duo of authors. They are the authors of more than 75 works of historical fiction. Eight of their books have won Gold Medallion Awards. Over 35 million copies of their books have been sold in more than 20 languages.

== Career ==
Bodie has written articles appearing in The Saturday Evening Post, U.S. News & World Report, and The American West. In the 1970s, she also worked as a screenwriter for John Wayne's production company Batjac Productions and co-wrote Fall Guy with Wayne's stunt double Charles H. Roberson. Bodie has also worked with ABC Circle Films as a writer and researcher. The couple works as a writing team with Brock as the researcher and story-line consultant and Bodie as co-author.

== Personal life ==
Born in Bakersfield, California, the couple first met each other when they were three years old. They were married as college sophomores in 1970 and have four children, who are also authors. Bodie holds a PhD in creative writing and also holds degree in journalism and communications and Brock holds a PhD in history and a master's degree in education. They divide their time between London, Nevada, Hawaii and Central California.

== Published works ==
=== The Zion Diaries series ===
- The Gathering Storm
- Against the Wind (pending publication 2011)
- Their Finest Hour (never published)

=== A.D. Chronicles series ===
- First Light
- Second Touch
- Third Watch
- Fourth Dawn
- Fifth Seal
- Sixth Covenant
- Seventh Day
- Eighth Shepherd
- Ninth Witness
- Tenth Stone
- Eleventh Guest
- Twelfth Prophecy

=== Zion Covenant series ===
- Vienna Prelude
- Prague Counterpoint
- Munich Signature
- Jerusalem Interlude
- Danzig Passage
- Warsaw Requiem
- London Refrain
- Paris Encore
- Dunkirk Crescendo

=== Zion Chronicles series ===
- The Gates of Zion
- A Daughter of Zion
- The Return to Zion
- A Light in Zion
- The Key to Zion

=== Shiloh Legacy series ===
- In My Father's House
- A Thousand Shall Fall
- Say to This Mountain
- Shiloh Autumn

=== Galway Chronicles series ===
- Only the River Runs Free
- Of Men and of Angels
- Ashes of Remembrance
- All Rivers to the Sea

=== Zion Legacy series ===
- Jerusalem Vigil
- Thunder from Jerusalem
- Jerusalem's Heart
- Jerusalem Scrolls
- Stones of Jerusalem
- Jerusalem's Hope

=== The Saga Of The Sierras ===
- The Man from Shadow Ridge
- Riders of the Silver Rim
- Gold Rush Prodigal
- Sequoia Scout
- Cannons of the Comstock
- Year of the Grizzly
- Shooting Star
- Delta Passage (a.k.a. Winds of Promise)
- Hangtown Lawman (a.k.a. To Gather the Wind)
- Cumberland Crossing (a.k.a. Winds of the Cumberland)

=== Wayward Wind series ===
- Winds of Promise
- To Gather the Wind
- Winds of the Cumberland

=== The Little Books of Why ===
- Why a Manger?
- Why a Shepherd?
- Why a Star?
- Why a Crown?

=== Other novels ===
- Legend of Storey County
- Hope Valley War
- Shiloh Autumn Which follows the story on from the 'Shiloh Legacy' series.
- Twilight of Courage
- Icon Hard Back and (e-book)
- Love Finds You In Lahaina
- When Jesus Wept - The first in the three-book series "The Jerusalem Chronicles" book 2"Take this Cup" book 3"Behold The Man"

=== Non-fiction ===
- Writer to Writer
- Protecting Your Income and Your Family's Future
