= Randy Alcorn =

American Christian author (born 1954)

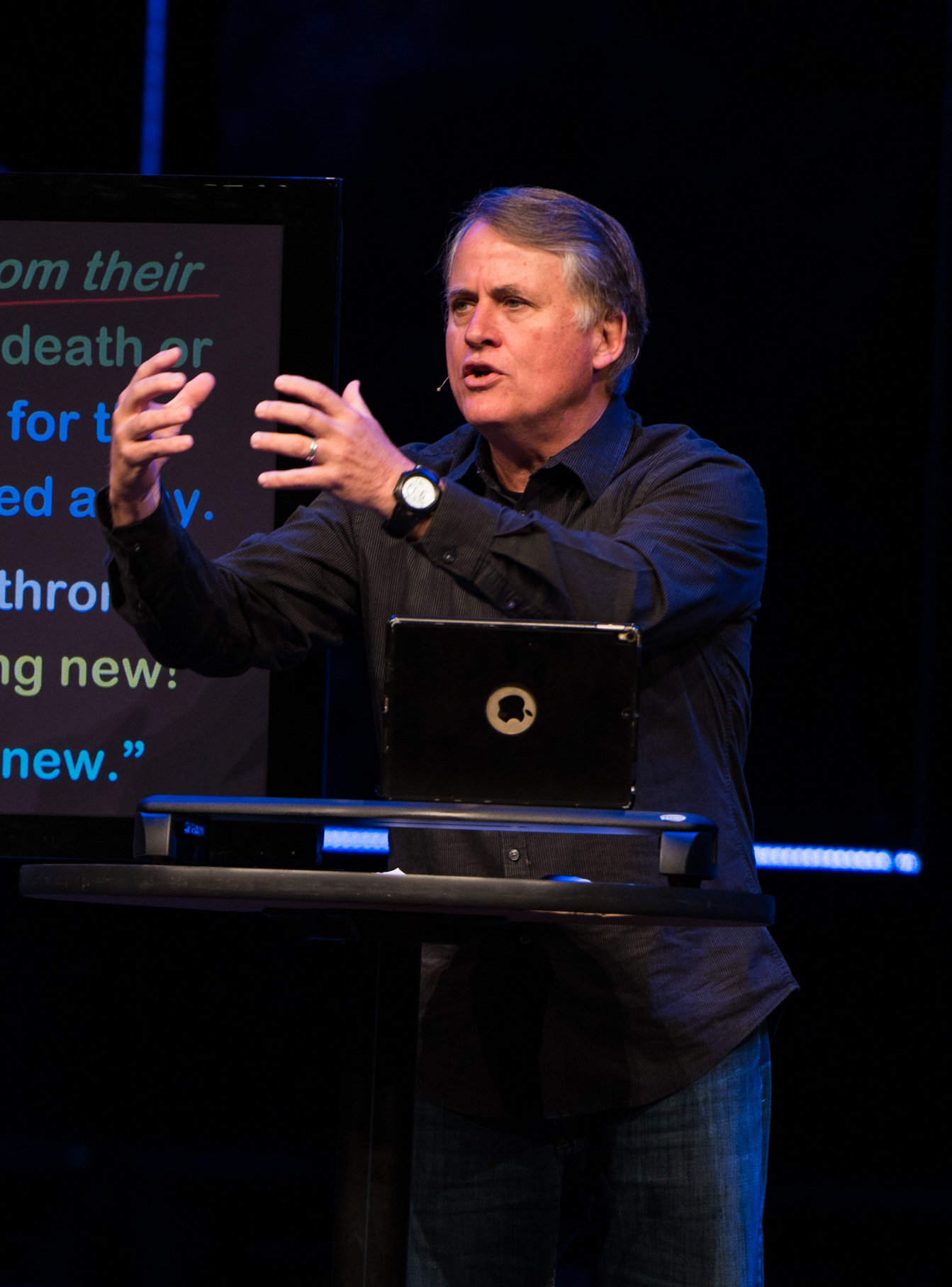
Randy Alcorn giving a presentation

Randy C. Alcorn is an American Christian author who has written over sixty books, including both fiction and non-fiction. They have sold over 12 million copies and been translated into 70 languages. His influences include CS Lewis, A.W. Tozer and Francis Schaeffer. He is also the founder and director of Eternal Perspective Ministries, a nonprofit Bible teaching organisation.

== Life ==
Alcorn was born June 23, 1954, in Portland, Oregon, to Arthur, a tavern owner, and Lucille, a homemaker.

He married Nanci Noren in 1975 and they had two daughters, Karina and Angela. He was the pastor of Good Shepherd Community Church, Boring, Oregon, from 1977 to 1990.

He has a Bachelor of Theology and a Master of Arts in Biblical Studies from Multnomah University. He also has an Honorary Doctorate from Western Seminary. He has taught part-time for both the aforementioned institutions.

His wife, Nanci, died in 2022 from colon cancer.

== Writing ==
Alcorn's first book, Christians in the Wake of the Sexual Revolution (1985) was later revised as Restoring Sexual Sanity in 2000. Women under Stress: Preserving Your Sanity was co-authored with his wife, Nanci, and was released in 1987.

His other books include ProLife Answers to ProChoice Arguments (1994), The Treasure Principle (2001), Heaven (2004), If God Is Good: Faith in the Midst of Suffering and Evil (2009), and Face to Face with Jesus: Seeing Him as He Really Is (2018).

Alcorn's novels include Edge of Eternity (1998), Lord Foulgrin's Letters: How to Strike Back at the Tyrant by Deceiving and Destroying His Human Vermin (2001), Safely Home (2001), which won the 2002 Gold Medallion Award, and The Ishbane Conspiracy (2001), which was co-authored with his daughters, Angela and Karina.

He also wrote a series of Ollie Chandler novels; Deadline (1994), Dominion (1996), and Deception (2007).

== Imprisonment ==
Alcorn was involved in a pro-life protest outside an abortion clinic whilst pastor at Good Shepherd Community Church. After refusing to pay damages and legal fees to the clinic, he was sentenced to two days imprisonment. When he learned that his church would be issued a writ of garnishment as a way for the court to obtain payment, he stepped down from the pastorate so as not to put his church in the position of either paying the abortion facility or defying the court.
