= Rob Lacey =

British writer

Rob Lacey (1962 – 1 May 2006) was a British actor, storyteller and author of The Word on the Street (formerly The Street Bible) and The Liberator.

== Background ==
Lacey spent approximately 20 years as an actor and broadcaster, specialising in theatrical storytelling and performance poetry. He is best known for adapting Bible stories to the stage—initially as a one-man show that he performed at major Christian festivals in the UK and US, then later as a three-person show performed by the Lacey Theatre Company. Lacey's performances have attracted significant media attention, including the BBC, CNN, Fox News and USA Today.

Lacey also co-directed The Gate Arts Centre in his hometown of Cardiff, Wales.

== The Word on the Street ==
HarperCollins first published The Word on the Street in the United Kingdom in 2003 as The Street Bible. It was one of the bestselling religious books for the next two years, ultimately winning the Christian Booksellers Convention's Book of the Year award in 2004. The book was republished in 2004 in the United States as the word on the street through Zondervan in both print and ebook formats. This release was part of a larger effort by the publisher to reach younger audiences. At the same time the book was launched, Lacey partnered with musicians Bill Taylor-Beales and Rachel Taylor-Beales to produce an audio CD of his 75-minute performance of the Bible. The CD was nominated for an Audie Award by the Audio Publishers Association in 2004.

Lacey chose to write the book partially based on his own recollections of being told Bible stories when he was younger and how they felt "stale" to him. After the book was greenlit for publication, Lacey was diagnosed with bladder cancer. He continued to work on the book and has stated that "Working on this really kept me sane" and that "Because the Bible deals with the big issues--like life and death. And it really hit home." The book tells major stories of the Bible, paraphrasing the text in a distinctive, urban style inspired by Lacey's performances. Major biblical stories are recast as mini-blockbusters; individual psalms are rewritten as song lyrics; the Pauline epistles become emails to the fledgling "Jesus Liberation Movement" (aka the church).

Lacey performed parts of The Word on the Street at events such as Hallelujah Palooza, where his rendition of "The Good Samaritan" was met with a mixed reaction. Of the book, Richard N Ostling noted that the slang would not be to everyone's tastes and that Lacey included some interesting concepts, citing the rewrite of Genesis 1:1-3.

== Death ==
Lacey died of bladder cancer on 1 May 2006, aged 43. He was survived by his wife, Sandra Harnisch-Lacey, and his two children. Harnisch-Lacey later published a memoir of her life with Lacey, People Like Us.

== Bibliography ==
- The Street Bible; (UK) (2003, HarperCollins) as the word on the street (US) (2004, Zondervan)
- Street Life (2004, Zondervan, with Nick Page)
- The Liberator (2006, Zondervan)
