= Irma Joubert =

South African author

- Born: August 28, 1947 (age 79)
- Education: University of Pretoria
- Occupation: Novelist

Irma Joubert is a South African author and recipient of the ATKV Prize for Romance Novels. Her novel Anderkant Pontenilo has been recognised in South Africa as one of the 20 best books published in the country since the advent of democracy in 1994.

== Biography ==
A graduate of the University of Pretoria, Joubert was a high school teacher for 35 years before retiring in 2004 to focus on her writing. The following year, while working as a freelance journalist, she was the recipient of the Media24 award for Specialist Journalist of the Year and was a finalist in the Mondi journalism awards.

Joubert's current literary focus is on historical novels. Her Tussen stasies trilogy, consisting of Ver wink die Suiderkruis, Tussen stasies en Tolbos, together with her Pontenilo trilogy: Anderkant Pontenilo, Pérsomi, and Kronkelpad, have all been translated into Dutch, and have all featured among the Top 10 best sellers on publication.

Tussen stasies has been translated into German and in 2015 was published in English by US publisher HarperCollins under the title The Girl from the Train. She has completed the second book in her third trilogy.

== Awards and accolades ==
In 2008, Joubert featured as one of three finalists in the ATKV literary awards for Tussen Stasies, and in 2010 she won an ATKV award for Anderkant Pontenilo. In 2014, she was the recipient of the Netherlands' BCB Publieksprijs for Kronkelpad, while Anderkant Pontenilo has been recognised in South Africa as one of the 20 best South African books since the advent of democracy in 1994.

Joubert was awarded the University of Pretoria's Tuks Laureate Award in 2014, the highest recognition accorded to the university's alumni.

== Published works ==
- 1. Veilige hawe
- 2. Tuiskoms (a collection of short stories)
- 3. Verbode Drif (a historical novel, spanning 1903–1910)

=== First trilogy ===
- 4. Ver wink die Suiderkruis (set in 1932–1933)
- 5. Tussen stasies (spanning World War II to 1958)
- 6. Tolbos (set in 1976–1989)

=== Second trilogy ===
- 7. Anderkant Pontenilo (historical novel spanning 1938 - 1945)
- 8. Pérsomi, kind van die brakrant (1938–1968)
- 9. Kronkelpad (1938–1983)

=== Third trilogy ===
- 10. Immer wes (a historical novel spanning 1905–1947)
- 11. Mentje - Kind van die Pas-Opkamp (a historical novel)
- 12. Na 'n plaas in Afrika (a historical novel)
