= Regina Brett =

American journalist (born 1956)

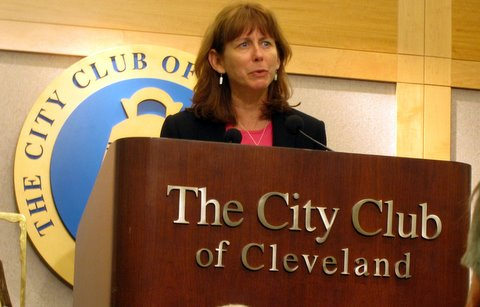
- Born: May 31, 1956 (age 70)
- Occupation: Journalist
- Title: Author, inspirational speaker, columnist
- Website: www.reginabrett.com

Regina Brett (born May 31, 1956) is an American author, inspirational speaker and newspaper columnist currently writing for The Cleveland Jewish News. Her columns are syndicated through Jewish News Service. Brett's debut book "God Never Blinks" has been translated into 24 languages, and she has written 9 books for the Polish market, which have sold 900,000 copies. Her latest book, "52 Words That Will Change Your Life … One Week at a Time" was released in October, 2025.

== Career highlights ==
She was a Pulitzer Prize finalist for commentary in 2008 and 2009. Her first book, "God Never Blinks: 50 Lessons for Life's Little Detours" was published in April, 2010 by Grand Central Publishing. It is now in 26 countries. Her second book, "Be the Miracle: 50 Lessons for Making the Impossible Possible", was published in 2012. Her third book, "God is Always Hiring: 50 Life Lessons for Finding Fulfilling Work," was published in 2015. All three books have been bestsellers in Poland.

From 2000 to 2017, she wrote columns for The Plain Dealer, Ohio's largest newspaper. Before that, Brett worked as a columnist for the Akron Beacon Journal in Akron, Ohio for seven years. Over the course of her career, Brett has written over 2,500 newspaper columns.

From 2006 to 2010, Brett hosted The Sound of Ideas, a radio show on Cleveland NPR affiliate WCPN 90.3 FM. From 2011 to 2013, she hosted The Regina Brett Show on Akron, Ohio NPR affiliate WKSU 89.7 FM. The weekly program was inspired by Brett's book.

Brett has a bachelor's degree in journalism from Kent State University and a master's degree in religious studies from John Carroll University.

In 1998, Brett was diagnosed with breast cancer and included her experiences of chemotherapy and her recuperation in her columns in the Akron Beacon Journal. These columns earned her a National Headliner Award.

In 2006, Brett wrote a column for The Plain Dealer entitled "50 Life Lessons", which has since been the most distributed column she has written to date, appearing on blogs as well as social networking websites like Twitter and Facebook. In many of these instances, Brett is misidentified as a 90-year-old woman. The "50 Life Lessons" column was expanded to fifty chapters for her first book, "God Never Blinks: 50 Lessons for Life's Little Detours".

Brett released her second book, "Be the Miracle: 50 Lessons for Making the Impossible Possible" in 2013, followed by "God Is Always Hiring: 50 Lessons for Finding Fulfilling Work" in 2015 and "Little Detours and Spiritual Adventures: Inspiration for Times When Life Doesn't Go as Planned" in 2024. Her latest book, "52 Words That Will Change Your Life… One Week at a Time," was released in October, 2025.

From 2020 to 2022, Brett hosted the podcast Little Detours, which featured interviews with inspirational guests.

In 2024, Brett launched a Substack titled "Little Detours with Regina Brett, which publishes regularly.

== Awards and honors ==
- 1999 Lifetime Achievement Batten Medal
- 2009 Cleveland Press Club Hall of Fame inductee
- Two-time National Headliner Awards winner.
- 1998 Northern Ohio Live Magazine Award of Achievement.
- National Society of Newspaper Columnists Humor Writer Award (she was the President from 1998 to 1999).
- 2003 The Society for Professional Journalists "Best Columnist in Ohio" Award.
- Five-time Ohio Associated Press award winner (including Best Columnist in Ohio in 2008 and 2009).
- 2009 Liberty Bell Award from the Cleveland Metropolitan Bar Association
- 2009 Silver Gavel Award from the American Bar Association
- 2009 Ohio Library Council "Citizen of the Year"
- 2013 Ohio Excellence in Journalism Award in radio show category
- 2013 National Federation of Press Women Communications Contest
- 2014 Simon Rockower Awards for Excellence in Jewish Journalism from the American Jewish Press Association
- 2014 The Louis Rapoport Award for Excellence in Commentary for newspapers with a circulation of 14,999 and under
- 2014 First-place Best of Show Best Columnist 2014 Ohio Society for Professional Journalists
- 2016 The Louis Rapoport Award for Excellence in Commentary for newspapers with a circulation of 14,999 and under
- 2016 Best in Ohio from Press Club of Cleveland All Ohio Excellence in Journalism Awards
- 2018 Best Columnist in Ohio's Best Journalism Contest
