= Jen Hatmaker =

American author (born 1974)

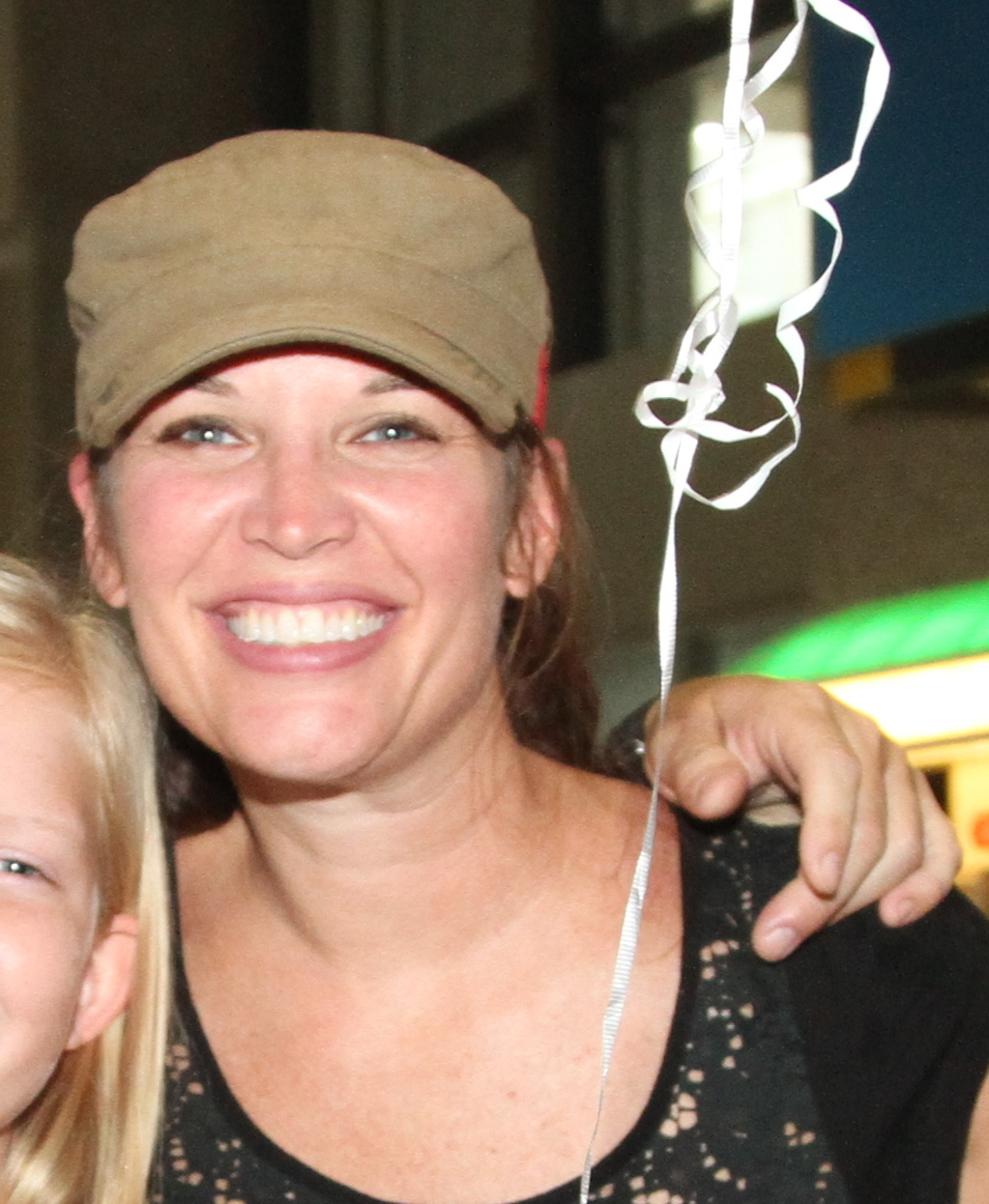
- Hatmaker in 2011
- Born: Jennifer Lynn King; 1974 (age 51–52); United States
- Occupations: Author, Podcaster
- Spouse: Brandon Hatmaker (m. 1993; div. 2020)
- Children: 5
- Website: jenhatmaker.com

Jennifer Lynn Hatmaker (née King; born 1974) is an American author, speaker, blogger, and television presenter.

In 2014, Hatmaker was featured in Christianity Today magazine. She and her then-husband Brandon, joined by their five children, hosted the HGTV series Your Big Family Renovation in Buda, Texas. She had a New York Times bestselling book, For the Love, in 2015.

== Evolving ministry and theology ==
In 2008, Hatmaker and her then-husband, Brandon, founded Austin New Church in Austin, Texas. She was thought to be a successor to Houston evangelist Beth Moore. She headlined at women's events, parenting and adoption conferences, and participated in a variety of social service ministries such as the Legacy Collective which has been active in Texas hurricane recovery.

In Jen Hatmaker's 2020 book Fierce, Free, and Full of Fire she wrote of exchanging evangelical theology for "the wild terrain of the wilderness." Hatmaker discontinued attending church services towards the end of 2020, several months after her divorce announcement. She wrote of having no further interest in religious systems or structures and was supportive of others who felt the same.

In Hatmaker's interview with Dr. Christena Cleveland, author of God Is a Black Woman, Hatmaker referenced "the patriarchy and racism and all the 'isms'" declaring "it would truly be the liberation of the whole earth if everyone was valued as divine." This is consistent with the current ideologies of progressive and affirming Austin New Church she had helped found, where portions of the 2022 Mother's Day service featured feminine pronouns and imagery for God.

Hatmaker's social media interviews include 'Pioneer Woman' Ree Drummond, sexologist Dr. Celeste Holbrook on creating your own sexual ethic, endorsement of Cannabidiol (CBD) products, and promoting sexual wellness products.

== Views ==
=== LGBTQ advocacy ===
In 2016 both Jen and Brandon Hatmaker came out in support of same-sex marriage. In April 2016 Jen Hatmaker called for the full inclusion of LGBT people into the Christian community. Hatmaker's views came through reasoning about the "fruit" of LGBT+ prohibitions (Matthew 7:15-20; Galatians 5:19-26; James 3:17), which critics have described as consequentialism; she stated that "the fruit of the non-affirming Christian tree...is rotten," a point also made by other affirming evangelicals. She reiterated her position in October 2016, and as a result, LifeWay Christian Resources decided to discontinue selling her publications.

During 2020 June pride month, Hatmaker featured her 18-year-old lesbian daughter, who had been out for some time, in a celebratory podcast. The episode concluded with, "I'm so glad you're gay…. I'm thrilled about your future." The podcast came on the heels of the release of Hatmaker's new book, Fierce, Free, and Full of Fire: The Guide to Being Glorious You. In the book, she wrote that she traded evangelical theology for "the wild terrain of the wilderness."

Hatmaker is supportive of gender-affirming care for transgender minors. In 2022 Texas Governor Greg Abbott upheld his attorney general statement, "There is no doubt" that gender transition of minor is 'child abuse' under Texas law." Hatmaker pushed back by promoting Tyler Merritt's response which asserted Governor Abbott's position was "heartless, outdated" and declared we "are coming after you."

=== Abortion ===
After the 2022 reversal of Roe v. Wade, Hatmaker wrote about her pro-choice position. She declared women's bodies are "theirs alone", so abortion should be a choice women make for their own reasons.

== Personal life ==
In 1993, Hatmaker married Brandon Hatmaker. They have five children, two of whom were adopted from Ethiopia. In September 2020, Hatmaker announced their divorce. She said on her social media streams that after 27 years of marriage she and Brandon were getting divorced, and described it as "completely unexpected". In August 2025, during an interview to promote her new book, Awake: A Memoir, Hatmaker told The New York Times that she was forced to announce the divorce sooner than planned after independent Christian reporter Julie Roys, whom Hatmaker described as "a journalist—and I’m using that term loosely," learned about it via public records and published an article about it. Earlier, in response to criticism over her decision to run the story, Roys said someone had sent her the divorce papers, and the divorce was all but certain to become public "with or without me." Hatmaker went further in Awake, saying that Roys had announced the divorce while she was still processing it; she hadn't even had a chance to tell her family. In October, Roys publicly apologized to Hatmaker.

In May 2021, Hatmaker stopped attending church services, but said she would "never get over Jesus."

Hatmaker is now in a long distance relationship with author and activist Tyler Merritt. Her social media platforms include aspects of navigating the nuances of being a bi-racial couple, and an ongoing series on adult sex education.

== Works ==
- Hatmaker, Jen (May 9, 2008). Ms. Understood: Rebuilding the Feminine Equation. NavPress. ISBN 978-160006216-2.
- ——— (June 1, 2010). Out of the Spin Cycle: Devotions to Lighten Your Mother Load. Revell. ISBN 978-0-80073448-0.
- ——— (January 1, 2012). 7: An Experimental Mutiny Against Excess. Yates & Yates. ISBN 978-1-43367296-5.
- ——— (February 1, 2014). Make Over: Revitalizing the Many Roles You Fill. NavPress. ISBN 978-1576838945.
- ——— (February 27, 2014). Tune In: Hearing God's Voice Through the Static. A Modern Girl's Bible Study. Tyndale House Publishers. ISBN 978-1-61747-226-8.
- ——— (July 1, 2014). Interrupted: When Jesus Wrecks Your Comfortable Christianity. NavPress. ISBN 978-1-63146353-2.
- ——— (August 18, 2015). For the Love: Fighting for Grace in a World of Impossible Standards. Thomas Nelson. ISBN 978-0-71803182-4.
- ——— (2017). Of Mess and Moxie: Wrangling Delight Out of This Wild and Glorious Life. Thomas Nelson. ISBN 978-0-7180-3186-2.
- ——— (2020). Fierce, Free, and Full of Fire: The Guide to Being Glorious You. Thomas Nelson. ISBN 978-0-71808814-9.
- ——— (March 3, 2020). 7: An Experimental Mutiny Against Excess (upd., rev. ed.). Convergent Books. ISBN 978-0-59323744-1.
- ——— (September 23, 2025). Awake: A Memoir. Simon & Schuster. ISBN 9781668219522.
