= Vienna Prelude =

Book by Bodie and Brock Thoene

Vienna Prelude is the first book of the Zion Covenant historical fiction series by Bodie and Brock Thoene. It won the ECPA Gold Medallion Award after being reissued in 2005.It was originally published in 1989.

== Plot summary ==
Elisa Lindheim, a Jewish/German musician has helplessly stood by as her rights as a Jew are slowly taken away. When she and her family attempt to leave their homeland of Germany to take refuge in Austria, her Jewish father is arrested and held for ransom by the notorious Gestapo. As Hitler's noose draws tighter around the Jews, Elisa must seek the help of handsome American journalist, John Murphy. Together they must find her father and find a way to get him out of Germany to safety.
