= Julianna Glasse =

American singer-songwriter (born 1984)

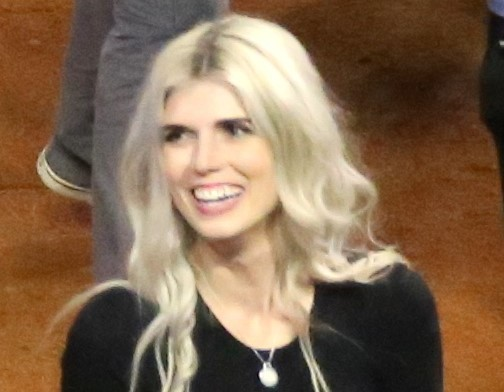
- Glasse at the 2016 World Series

Background information
- Born: Julianna Joy Gilmore; October 5, 1984 (age 42); Orlando, Florida, U.S.
- Genres: Christian pop, Christian EDM
- Occupations: Singer, songwriter, author
- Instrument: Vocals
- Years active: 2008–2017
- Spouse: Ben Zobrist (div. 2022)
- Website: www.juliannaglasse.com

Julianna Joy Glasse (née Gilmore; former married name Zobrist; born October 5, 1984) is an American former Christian musician who performed Christian pop style of electronic dance music. She released two extended plays, The Tree (2009) and Say It Now (2012), with her first studio album, Shatterproof (2016). The album's two singles, "The Dawn" and "Alive", charted on the Billboard charts. She has also written or co-written several books. She was married to professional baseball player Ben Zobrist and released her music under the name Julianna Zobrist.

== Early life ==
Glasse was born in Orlando, Florida, on October 5, 1984, as Julianna Joy Gilmore. She is the fourth of six children. When she was seven years old, her father took a position at Parkview Church in Iowa City, Iowa, while she attended Heritage Christian School. While attending Iowa City High School, she became interested in fashion. She attended Belmont University, in Nashville, Tennessee, enrolling in the fall of 2003 and graduating in May 2007 with her bachelor's degree in commercial voice.

== Music career ==
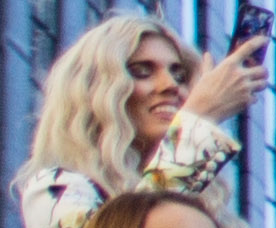
Glasse during the Cubs 2016 World Series victory parade

Glasse's music recording career commenced in 2008 with the recording of the extended play (EP) The Tree, released on January 8, 2009 under the name Julianna Zobrist. She released Say It Now, another EP, on April 17, 2012. Her first studio album, Shatterproof, was released on July 1, 2016. The two singles from the album, "The Dawn" and "Alive", both charted on the Billboard magazine charts. Her single "The Dawn", peaked at No. 30 on the Christian AC Indicator chart. The second single, "Alive", peaked at No. 48 on the Christian Digital Songs chart. She was named in the top-10 independent artist that should get signed by a major Christian music record label by 365 Days of Inspiring Media in 2015.

Glasse sang the national anthem for the Kansas City Royals, when her former husband played for the team. In 2016, when he played for the Chicago Cubs, she sang "God Bless America" before Game 4 of the 2016 World Series at Wrigley Field. She sang "God Bless America" at a Cubs game in April 2017. She sang at the National Prayer Breakfast in 2017.

== Personal life ==
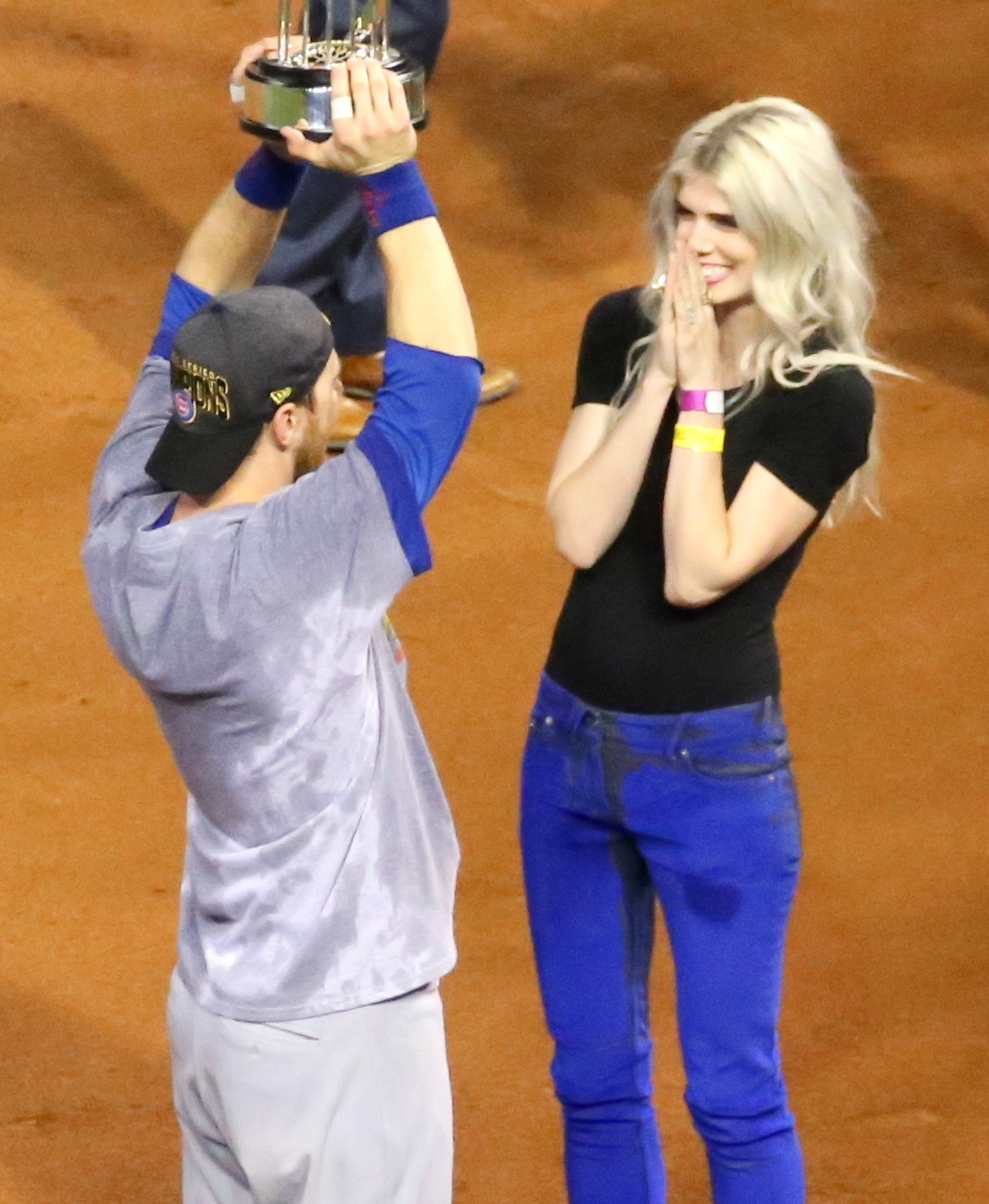
Glasse and her then-husband Ben Zobrist celebrating after he won the 2016 World Series Most Valuable Player Award

Glasse married former Major League Baseball player Ben Zobrist in 2005. They have three children together. In May 2019, Zobrist filed for legal separation in Tennessee, citing "inappropriate marital conduct", on the same day that she filed for divorce in Illinois. In a deposition for the divorce, she said that she had an affair with their former pastor and marriage counselor. After her divorce, she changed her last name to Glasse.

Glasse received a degree from the University of Oxford. She started a non-profit organization called This is What Happens When Women Read, later writing a book with that title. The title is based on something Glasse claimed that Zobrist said to her during their marriage.

== Discography ==
Studio albums

- Shatterproof (July 1, 2016)

EPs

- The Tree (January 8, 2009)
- Say It Now (April 17, 2012)

== Bibliography ==
- Zobrist, Ben; Zobrist, Julianna; Yorkey, Mike (April 2014). Double Play. B&H Publishing Group. ISBN 9781433683336.
- Zobrist, Julianna (September 18, 2018). Pull It Off: Removing Your Fears and Putting On Confidence. Hachette Nashville. ISBN 978-1-5460-2594-8.
- Glasse, Julianna (October 13, 2026). This is What Happens When Women Read. Spiegel & Grau. ISBN 978-1966302346.
