= Tamera Alexander =

American author of Christian fiction

- Born: August 8, 1961 (age 65); DeKalb County, Georgia, USA
- Occupation: Christian author
- Spouse: Joe F. Alexander (born 1959, married 1984–present)
- Children: Daughter (born 1987) of Nashville; Son (born 1989) of Nashville
- Writing career
- Genre: Romance
- Notable works: Revealed, The Inheritance
- Notable awards: RITA award – Inspirational Romance; 2007 Revealed; RITA award – Inspirational Romance; 2010 The Inheritance
- Website: www.tameraalexander.com

Tamera Lynn Gattis Alexander (born August 8, 1961) is an American author of Christian fiction, who specializes in the inspirational romance genre. She is best known for her award-winning first series, the Fountain Creek Chronicles (2006–07).

== Biography ==
=== Early life and education ===
Tamera Alexander grew up in Decatur, Georgia, the daughter of an insurance company executive and a bank manager. As a child, Alexander enjoyed writing poetry and short stories, but never dreamed of some day writing fiction as a career. She attended and would later graduate high school from Greater Atlanta Christian School in 1979. Early advisors led her to choose what was regarded as a more practical livelihood within the field of business—a discipline she began studying in 1979 while attending Harding University. She earned her Bachelor of Business Administration degree in management in 1983.

=== Career ===
Upon graduation, she began her business career in Atlanta, Georgia, before accepting a position with Data Communications Corporation in Memphis, Tennessee in 1984 as an entry-level customer service representative. Within three years, she had advanced through the company ranks and was managing a staff of 27 employees and supporting corporate clients such as Turner Broadcasting System (TBS), with a heavy traveling schedule. The arrival of her first child in 1987 and a new employment opportunity for her husband, led to a family relocation to Abilene, Texas, also in 1987. A second child and another job opportunity for her husband resulted in another move in 1990, this time to Greeley, Colorado, where she began to experience the landscape and history of the Rocky Mountains.

After her mother-in-law encouraged her to read a book by Janette Oke in 1994, Alexander subsequently began to read every work of Christian fiction she could find and penned her first manuscript in 2000, a historical piece set in the 1870s Colorado Territory and unofficially titled, As High as the Heavens. The manuscript made it all the way to the final review board with Bethany House Publishers before being rejected in 2002. Rejections from another publisher would follow, and although at first discouraged, she quickly returned to the drawing board, determined to apply the planning and analytical skills she had learned in business to studying the craft of writing. She began dissecting numerous novels in an attempt to better understand the recipe for success in historical Christian fiction/romance.

Her second completed manuscript, Rekindled, was contracted by Bethany House in 2004 and published in March 2006, where it quickly climbed to #8 on the Christian Booksellers Association CBA national best-sellers list in May 2006. The book was in its tenth printing as of February 2010.

Alexander's subsequent novels between 2006 and 2010 were each in the inspirational fiction genre and set in the Colorado Territory (circa latter 1800s) with the Rocky Mountains as a landscape backdrop. Her second novel, Revealed, climbed to #18 on the CBA national best-sellers list in March 2008. Remembered, the third novel in the Fountain Creek Chronicles series, recently went to a fifth printing (March 2009).

Alexander's second three-book series, Timber Ridge Reflections, was launched in May 2008 with the release of From a Distance. The book debuted on the ECPA national fiction best-seller list at #20 in July 2008 and peaked on Amazon.com at #30 for all titles in August 2010. The second title in the series, Beyond This Moment, was released in April 2009, and debuted at #10 on the ECPA May national fiction best-seller list and climbed to #7 in June. The title also debuted at #11 on the CBA national fiction best-sellers list for June 2009. It went to a second printing in June 2010.

In early 2008, Alexander was contracted by Thomas Nelson, Inc. to write the publisher's first historical romance novel for its "Women of Faith Fiction series." The Inheritance debuted at #1 as the top-selling Christian fiction romance title at Christian Book Distributors for March 2009 and also climbed to #15 and #11 on the CBA national best-sellers list for March and April 2009, respectively, appearing again at #19 in August 2009. The title also debuted at #17 on the ECPA national fiction best-seller list in April 2009. The Inheritance reappeared on the ECPA best-seller fiction list in January 2010 and the CBA best-seller fiction list in February 2010.

Alexander's third installment in the Timber Ridge Reflections series (Within My Heart) released August 2010 and had already climbed to the #1 bestseller spot in Fiction Romance at Christian Book Distributors by month's end. In addition, Within My Heart then climbed as high as #10 on the ECPA national best-seller fiction list for October 2010 and was later acclaimed as a finalist in both the RITA Awards (Romance Writers of America) and Christy Awards for best in the historical romance category.

Her next two series, each scheduled for three-books, draw from Nashville's historic mansions as backdrops (1860s to 1870s post Civil War). The Belmont Mansion (Tennessee) series launched in late October 2011 with release of the first title (A Lasting Impression). The title debuted at #13 on the ECPA national fiction best-seller list, December 2011, and reappeared most recently at #19 on the CBA best-seller fiction list (August 2012). The Belle Meade Plantation series launched in November 2012, with release of the first title (To Whisper Her Name), which debuted as a USA Today best-seller and climbed as high as #5 on Amazon.com. The second installment in the Belmont series (A Beauty So Rare) is set for release in May 2014.

=== Marriage and children ===
Tamera and Joe Alexander live in Brentwood, Tennessee. They have two children, currently in their 20s.

== Published works ==
- Fountain Creek Chronicles
  - Rekindled (Bethany House, 2006), ISBN 0-7642-0108-5
  - Revealed (Bethany House, 2006), ISBN 0-7862-9426-4
  - Remembered (Bethany House, 2007), ISBN 0-7642-0110-7
  - Fountain Creek Chronicles Omnibus (Bethany House, 2009), ISBN 0-7642-0736-9
- Timber Ridge Reflections
  - From a Distance (Bethany House, 2008), ISBN 0-7642-0389-4
  - Beyond This Moment (Bethany House, 2009), ISBN 0-7642-0389-4
  - Within My Heart (Bethany House, 2010), ISBN 0-7642-0391-6
- The Inheritance (Thomas Nelson, 2009), ISBN 1-59554-632-4
- Belmont Mansion Series
  - A Lasting Impression (Bethany House, 2011), ISBN 0-7642-0622-2
  - A Beauty So Rare (Bethany House, 2014), ISBN 0-7642-0623-0
  - A Note Yet Unsung (2017)
- Belle Meade Plantation Series
  - To Whisper Her Name (Zondervan, 2012), ISBN 0-3102-9106-2
  - To Win Her Favor (2015)
  - To Wager Her Heart (2017)
  - To Mend a Dream (2015)
- The Carnton Novels
  - Christmas at Carnton (2017)
  - With This Pledge (2019)
  - Colors of Truth (2020)

== Awards ==
Awards for Tamera Alexander
| Year | Nominated work | Category | Award | Result | Notes | Ref. |
|---|---|---|---|---|---|---|
| 2006 | | | Library Journal Top 5-Best Inspirational Book) | Won | | |
| 2006 | | | Reviewers' Choice Award Finalist - Best Inspirational | Finalist | | |
| 2007 | Revealed | Inspirational Romance | Romance Writers of America RITA Award | Won | | |
| 2007 & 2008 | | | HOLT Medallion Award of Merit | Won | | |
| 2008 | | | Christy Award for Best Romance | Won | | |
| 2009 | | | American Christian Fiction Writers Book of the Year Finalist | Finalist | | |
| 2009 | | | Christy Award for Best Historical Romance | Won | | |
| 2010 | | | Christy Award Double Finalist for Best Historical Romance | Won | | |
| 2010 | | | HOLT Medallion Award | Won | | |
| 2010 | The Inheritance | Inspirational Romance | Romance Writers of America RITA Award | Won | | |
| 2011 | | | Christy Award Finalist for Best Historical Romance | Finalist | | |
| 2011 | | | Rita Award Finalist for Best Inspirational Romance | Finalist | | |
| 2011 | | | National Readers' Choice Awards Finalist for Best Inspirational | Finalist | | |
| 2012 | | | Christy Award Finalist for Best Historical Romance | Finalist | | |
