= Safely Home =

2001 novel by Randy Alcorn

- Author: Randy Alcorn
- Language: English
- Genre: Christian, Evangelical novel
- Publisher: Tyndale House Publishers
- Publication date: July 2001
- Publication place: United States
- Media type: Print (hardcover)
- Pages: 402 pp
- ISBN: 0-8423-3791-1
- OCLC: 46769424
- Dewey Decimal: 813/.54 21
- LC Class: PS3551.L292 S24 2001

Safely Home is a 2001 Christian novel by American author Randy Alcorn. It was published by Tyndale House. It takes place in present-day China and follows the story of two Harvard roommates, one American and one Chinese, who reunite decades after graduation.

The novel won the 2002 Gold Medallion Book Award for evangelical literature.
