= The Mission Walker =

Non-fiction book by Edie Littlefield Sundby

- First edition
- Author: Edie Littlefield Sundby
- Language: English
- Genre: Non-fiction
- Publisher: Thomas Nelson
- Publication date: 2017
- Publication place: United States

The Mission Walker is a non-fiction book written by American author Edie Littlefield Sundby and an Audie Award Finalist for Best Inspirational Book. It is an adventure story and personal memoir about her life and illness battling stage IV gallbladder cancer, and describes her healing 1,600-mile walk of the old, historic El Camino Real de las Californias mission trail from Loreto, Mexico to Sonoma, California, with one lung. The personal story is interlaced with the story of the old Jesuit mission trail in Baja California Mexico, and the Franciscan mission trail in California, and cites more than fifty historical sources.

== Background ==
Before writing The Mission Walker, Edie Littlefield Sundby was a corporate executive, entrepreneur, and mother. In March 2007, Edie was diagnosed with stage-4 adenocarcinoma of the gallbladder with widespread metastasis, including liver, colon, peritoneum, and groin - and given a few months to live. While undergoing aggressive cancer treatment, she shared her reflections on life and illness, authoring essays in The New York Times and The Wall Street Journal. Over the course of six years she endured 79 rounds of chemotherapy, multiple radical surgeries (including the removal of her right lung, half her liver, and part of her colon and stomach), and intense radiation; through it all she walked, and credits walking with saving her life.

== Reception ==
The Mission Walker was a 2018 Audie Award Finalist for Best Inspirational Book, ultimately losing to Fire Road: The Napalm Girl’s Journey through the Horrors of War to Faith, Forgiveness, and Peace by Kim Phuc Phan Thi. Randall Sullivan, executive producer, Oprah Winfrey Network, and writer/contributing editor at Rolling Stone, wrote in the introduction to the book: "The Mission Walker is a marvelous book. Edie Littlefield Sundby writes of her battle against cancer with simple grace and enormous dignity. The journey she takes us on - her mission walk - is often arduous and at times harrowing, yet there's a spirit of uplift in even the most difficult passages... a moving meditation on the relationships between courage and faith, endurance and transcendence."
