= Howard C. Cutler =

American writer and psychiatrist

Howard C. Cutler is an American writer and psychiatrist who practices in Phoenix, Arizona. He is an expert in the science of human happiness, and co-wrote The Art of Happiness with the 14th Dalai Lama. Cutler has been interviewed by Time and O, The Oprah Magazine, as well as hundreds of radio and television programs. He has also spoken to audiences and offered courses/workshops to aid in happiness in the United States and around the World.

== Books ==
Cutler's most famous work is The Art of Happiness. Written with the 14th Dalai Lama, the first volume was on The New York Times Best Seller list for 97 weeks. The psychiatrist and Tibetan spiritual leader duo went on to write two more books together, The Art of Happiness at Work and The Art of Happiness in a Troubled World. Their books have been translated into 50 languages. Cutler is working on another book with the Dalai Lama.
