= Joel S. Rice =

American actor and film producer (born 1998)

Joel S. Rice is an American actor and film producer. He made his film debut in the slasher film Final Exam (1981), and appeared in several television productions before later pursuing a career as a producer. He has produced over ninety television films, beginning 1993. Rice has been married since 1988 and has two daughters, Hannah Mae (born 1998) and Sarah Rose (born 2001).

== Career ==
Originally from Boston, Massachusetts, Rice relocated to Los Angeles, California after obtaining a lead role in the horror film Final Exam (1981). He later became a social worker after leaving the entertainment industry, but returned to the film business as an executive producer, producing the television films Bonds of Love and Cries from the Heart, starring Patty Duke and Melissa Gilbert. He is well known for producing Hallmark movies and series. His breakout project was the mini series Tut for Spike network, which starred Ben Kingsley and Avan Jogia. He has executive-produced over 90 television films and productions since 1993. He is also the president of Muse Entertainment USA.

== Filmography ==
Actor

Year	Title	Role	Notes
1981	Final Exam	Radish	
1982	Crisis Counselor		Episode: "Female Menopause"
1985	Otherworld	Musician	Episode: "Rock and Roll Suicide"
2007	Shredderman Rules	Math Teacher	

Producer

Year	Title	Notes
1993	Bonds of Love	Television film
1994	The Disappearance of Vonnie	Television film
1994	Cries from the Heart	Television film
1994	Dangerous Intentions	Television film
1995	Dare to Love	Television film
1996	A Mother's Instinct	Television film
1996	The Secret She Carried	Television film
1996	Breaking Through	Television film
1997	Sleeping with the Devil	Television film
1998	I've Been Waiting for You	Television film
1998	About Sarah	Television film
1999	Half a Dozen Babies	Television film
2000	One Kill	Television film
2003	Code 11-14	Television film
2003	Audrey's Rain	Television film
2003	This Time Around	Television film
2003	Picking Up & Dropping Off	Television film
2004	The Reality of Love	Television film
2004	Love Rules	Television film
2004	Searching for David's Heart	Television film
2004	A Boyfriend for Christmas	Television film
2005	Recipe for a Perfect Christmas	Television film
2006	Shredderman Rules	Television film
2007	All I Want for Christmas	Television film
2007	The Note	Television film
2008	The Christmas Choir	Television film
2009	Taking a Chance on Love	Television film
2009	Unstable	Television film
2010	The Wild Girl	Television film
2010	Secrets of the Mountain	Television film
2010	The Jensen Project	Television film
2010	The Night Before the Night Before Christmas	Television film
2010	Reviving Ophelia	Television film
2010	An Old Fashioned Christmas	Television film
2011	Change of Plans	Television film
2011	Cyberbully	Television film
2011	Who Is Simon Miller?	Television film
2011	Desperately Seeking Santa	Television film
2011	Notes from the Heart Healer	Television film
2013	Bounty Hunters	13 episodes
2013	Exploding Sun	Television film
2013	Star Spangled Banners	Television film
2013	Signed, Sealed, Delivered	Television film
2013	Christmas with Tucker	Television film
2014	Northpole	Television film
2014	Signed, Sealed, and Delivered for Christmas	Television film
2015	A Wish Come True	Television film
2015	Bad Hair Day	Television film
2015	Aurora Teagarden Mystery: A Bone to Pick	Television film
2015	The Gourmet Detective	Television film
2015	Signed, Sealed, Delivered: From Paris with Love	Television film
2015	Tut	Miniseries
2015	Real Murders: An Aurora Teagarden Mystery	Television film
2015	Signed, Sealed, Delivered: Truth Be Told	Television film
2015	Signed, Sealed, Delivered: The Impossible Dream	Television film
2015	Northpole: Open for Christmas	Television film
2016	Love's Complicated	Television film
2016	Valentine Ever After	Television film
2016	Signed, Sealed, Delivered: From the Heart	Television film
2016	Sandra Brown's White Hot	Television film
2016	An Unexpected Christmas	Television film
2016	Signed, Sealed, Delivered: One in a Million	Television film
2016	Death Al Dente: A Gourmet Detective Mystery	Television film
2016	Signed, Sealed, Delivered: Lost Without You	Television film
2016	Autumn in the Vineyard	Television film
2016	The Julius House: An Aurora Teagarden Mystery	Television film
2017	A Rose for Christmas	Television film
2017	Framed for Murder: A Fixer Upper Mystery	Television film
2017	Love Locks	Television film
2017	Dead Over Heels: An Aurora Teagarden Mystery	Television film
2018	Flip That Romance	Television film
2019	Double Holiday	(TV movie)
2019	Turkey Drop	(TV movie)
2019	A Blue Ridge Mountain Christmas	(TV movie)
2019	Blood & Treasure (all episodes)	TV series
2020	Gourmet Detective: Roux the Day	(TV movie)
2020	A Beautiful Place to Die: A Martha's Vineyard Mystery	(TV movie)
