= Switched at birth =

Switched at birth may refer to:

- Babies switched at birth, when newborns' identities are mixed up at a hospital
- Switched at Birth (1991 film), a television film
- Switched at Birth (1999 film), a television film
- Switched at Birth (TV series), a 2011 television drama series
