= Genie Francis =

American actress (born 1962)

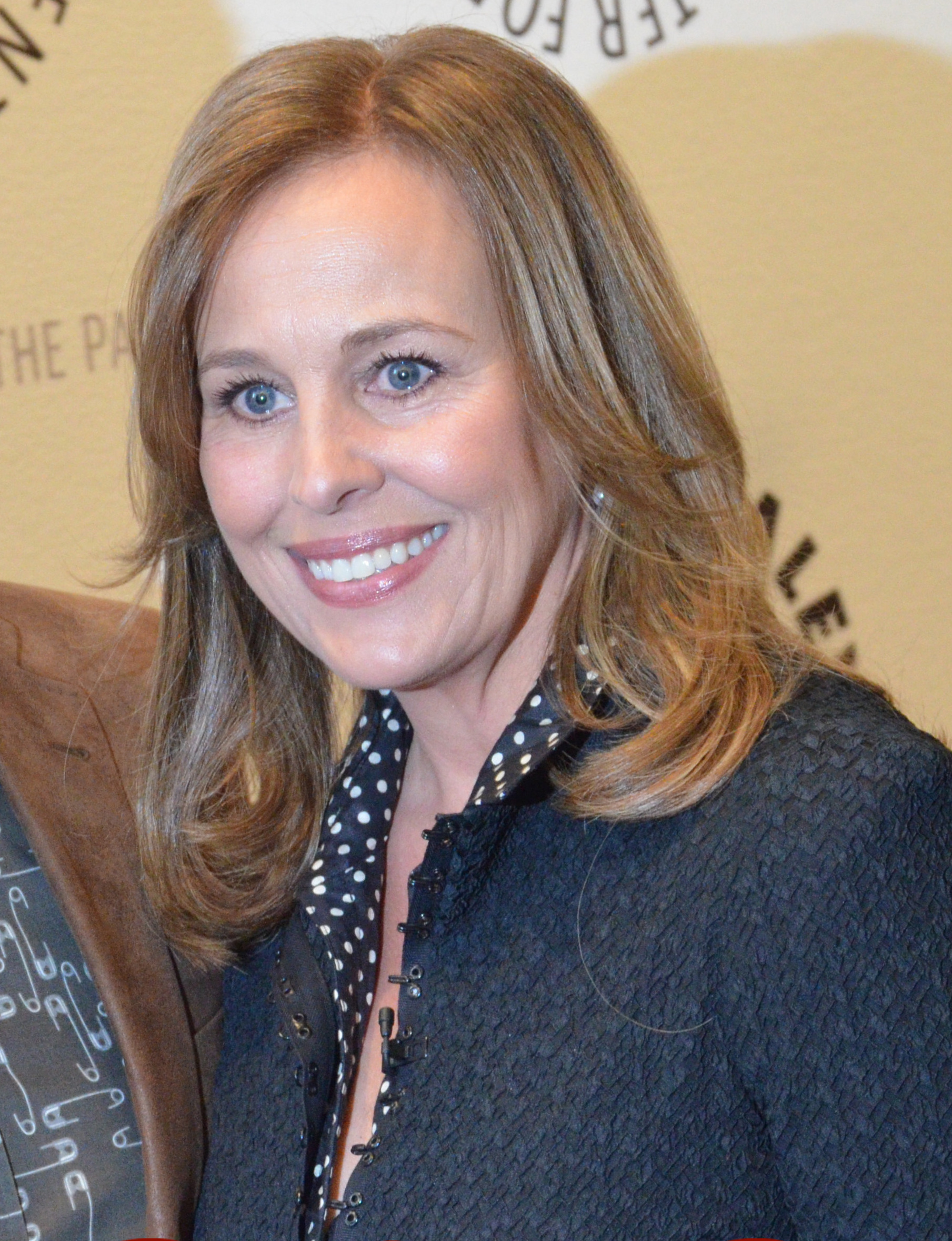
- Francis in 2013
- Born: May 26, 1962 (age 64); Englewood, New Jersey, U.S.
- Occupation: Actress
- Years active: 1976–present
- Known for: General Hospital; The Young and the Restless; Perry Mason: The Case of the Killer Kiss; North and South; Days of Our Lives
- Spouse: Jonathan Frakes (m. 1988)
- Children: 2
- Father: Ivor Francis
- Website: geniefrancis.com

Genie Francis (born May 26, 1962) is an American actress. She is best known for playing the role of Laura Spencer on the television soap opera General Hospital since 1977, for which she won a Daytime Emmy Award in 2007.

Francis also appeared in the soap operas Days of Our Lives from 1987 to 1989, All My Children from 1990 to 1992, and The Young and the Restless from 2011 to 2012.

== Early life ==
Francis was born in Englewood, New Jersey. Her father was Canadian actor Ivor Francis. Her mother, Rosemary Daley, was a former actress/model. Genie has an older brother, Ivor Jr., a younger brother, Kenneth, and an older half-sister, Shelley, from her father's first marriage.

== Career ==
Francis began acting on the television series Family, in the two part episode titled "Jury Duty". Her big break came in 1977 with the role of Laura Spencer on General Hospital. It would bring her instant stardom in the late 1970s. The television couple of Luke and Laura wed on November 17, 1981, with 30 million viewers tuning in to make the episode the highest-rated hour in soap opera history. At the peak of her success, in 1982, Francis left the series to try her hand at prime-time television. She soon landed a starring role in her own series, Bare Essence, which was unsuccessful. She returned to General Hospital in 1983 for a limited run, to coincide with the departure of Luke when Anthony Geary decided to leave the series.

In 1984, 1986, and 1990 Francis guest starred on Murder, She Wrote as Jessica Fletcher's niece Victoria. In 1985, she starred in the miniseries North and South as Brett Main Hazard. Francis would reprise this role in 1986 and 1994 in the miniseries North and South: Book II and Heaven and Hell: North and South Book III respectively. In 1993, she starred as Kris Buckner in the television film Perry Mason: The Case of the Killer Kiss, which was based on the CBS television series of the same name. In 1996, Francis provided the voice of Betty Ross on the Incredible Hulk animated series that ran on UPN.

Through the years, Francis has appeared on numerous other daytime soaps. She starred on Days of Our Lives as Diana Colville (a reporter who became involved with John Black, who at the time believed himself to be Roman Brady) from 1987 to 1989 and on All My Children as con artist and incest victim Ceara Connor Hunter from 1990 to 1992. She reprised her role as Ceara on Loving in a crossover storyline in November 1991. Ceara was "killed off" when her character prepared to move to that soap's town of Corinth (although it was an unseen extra stepping off the bus into the line of fire), and years later, Laura also appeared in Corinth on General Hospital when ex-husband Luke found her tied up in the Alden family basement. She then returned to General Hospital in 1993. In 1994, when Francis became pregnant with her first child, the pregnancy was written into the show and she took six weeks off for maternity leave. However, in early 1997, when she was pregnant again, she took a much longer absence from the show, staying away for nearly a year and a half.

In 2004, Francis appeared in Teacher's Pet and Thunderbirds. In June 2006, she began negotiating with the casting directors on the show to return to the role of Laura Spencer for a limited run through November. Francis returned with spectacular fanfare to commemorate the 25th anniversary of Luke and Laura's wedding. Though she reprised the role for only one month, Francis' stint garnered her a Daytime Emmy for Outstanding Supporting Actress in a Drama Series. Francis again returned to General Hospital as Laura in August 2008, appearing until November 12. In December 2008, she had a starring role as Peyton MacGruder in the Hallmark Channel movie, The Note, which earned her critical acclaim. Francis reprised this role on January 31, 2009 in the Hallmark Channel movie, Taking a Chance on Love and again in 2012 in the Hallmark Channel movie Notes from the Heart Healer.

In March 2011, it was announced that Francis would join The Young and the Restless as Genevieve Atkinson, the long-absent birth mother of Cane Ashby. In this appearance she was reunited with former General Hospital co-star Tristan Rogers, who portrayed Colin Atkinson, Cane's estranged biological father. She received her second Daytime Emmy nomination in the category of Outstanding Supporting Actress in a Drama Series for her role as Genevieve in May 2012.

On September 13, 2012, it was announced that Francis had been let go from her role on The Young and the Restless due to budget cuts. On January 8, 2013, executive producer Frank Valentini and Entertainment Weekly confirmed that Francis would return to General Hospital on February 11. However, she remained with the series for only five months, as Laura departed for medical treatment in France, returning on June 5, 2015 as part of a storyline to help facilitate Anthony Geary's departure from the show, and she would later sign a contract to remain with the show. In January 2018, Francis was dropped to recurring status, but in late July 2018 signed a contract to return to General Hospital full time.

=== Other projects ===
Francis owned and operated a cottage-style home furnishings boutique called The Cherished Home in Belfast, Maine. She later stepped away from retail operations to accommodate her increased filming workload for television roles like The Young and the Restless.

In May 2007, Francis began appearing in magazine advertisements as a spokesperson for the Medifast Diet, claiming she lost 30 pounds using the diet as of December 2007.

In November 2009, Francis along with her brothers, Ivor Jr. and Kenneth, released the holiday album It's Christmas Time Again. Francis' whole family participated: Her children Eliza and Jamo performed backup vocals and percussion, while her husband, actor/director Jonathan Frakes, played the trombone. Francis decided to donate all of her proceeds from the record sales to the Sisters of Saint Francis Children's Mission in Cuernavaca, a mission founded by her cousin Sister Margaret.

== Personal life ==
Francis first met actor/director Jonathan Frakes in 1982 while filming the television miniseries Bare Essence. They met again during filming of the miniseries North and South. After some encouragement from Kirstie Alley, they began dating in 1985. They became engaged the following year, and were married on May 28, 1988. The couple has two children, Jameson Ivor Frakes and Elizabeth Frances Frakes. After residing in Belfast, Maine, they moved to Beverly Hills, California, in 2008 and later relocated to Calabasas, California.

== Filmography ==
=== Film ===
Year	Title	Role	Notes
1994	Camp Nowhere	Mrs. Speigel	Uncredited
2004	Teacher's Pet	Marsha/Marcia	Animated musical-comedy film based on the television series of the same name directed by Timothy Björklund.; Credited as Genie Ann Francis.
2004	Thunderbirds	Lisa Lowe	Science fiction-comedy-action-adventure film based on the 1960s television series of the same name and directed by Jonathan Frakes.

=== Television ===
Year	Title	Role	Notes
1976	Family	Alice Dennison	Episodes: "Jury Duty: Part 1" (S2:E11); "Jury Duty: Part 2" (S2:E12)
1977–84, 1993–2002, 2006, 2008, 2013, 2015–	General Hospital	Laura Spencer	Contract role: 1977–1982, 1993–2002, 2013, 2015–; Recurring role: 1983, 1984, 2006, 2008
1981	Fridays	Herself/Co-host	Episode: "Episode #3.3" (S3:E3); Special guest appearance with Anthony Geary
1982	Fantasy Island	Christa Ackland	Episode: "Daddy's Little Girl / The Whistle" (S5:E14)
1982–83	Bare Essence	Patricia 'Tyger' Hayes	1982 two-part miniseries (CBS); 1983 television series (NBC) 11 episodes
1984	Murder, She Wrote	Victoria	Episode: "Birds of a Feather" (S1:E4)
1984	Hotel	Jenny Bernard	Episode: "Outsiders"(S2:E5)
1985	North and South	Brett Main Hazard	Miniseries developed by Douglas Heyes.; Based on the novel North and South^{1} by John Jakes.
1985	Glitter	Guest	Episode: "The Matriarch" (S1:E10)
1986	North and South: Book II	Brett Main Hazard	Miniseries developed by Douglas Heyes.; Based on the novel Love and War by John Jakes.
1986	Murder, She Wrote	Victoria	Episode: "Corned Beef and Carnage" (S3:E5)
1987	The New Mike Hammer	Susan Timmons	Episode: "Body Shot" (S3:E13)
1987	Hotel	Melinda Jenkins	Episode: "Barriers" (S4:E18)
1987–89	Days of Our Lives	Diana Colville	Contract role: April 13, 1987, to June 21, 1989
1990	Murder, She Wrote	Victoria	Episode: "The Fixer-Upper" (S6:E15)
1990–92	All My Children	Ceara Connor Hunter	Contract role: June 27, 1990, to July 16, 1992
1991	Loving	Ceara Connor Hunter	Recurring role: October 31, 1991, to December 5, 1991
1993	Perry Mason: The Case of the Killer Kiss	Kris Buckner	Made-for-TV movie directed by Christian I. Nyby II.; Based on the CBS television series of the same name.
1994	Roseanne	Laura Spencer	Episode: "Suck Up or Shut Up" (S6:E13)
1994	Heaven and Hell: North and South Book III	Brett Main Hazard	Miniseries directed by Larry Peerce.; Based on the novel Heaven and Hell^{2} by John Jakes.
1995	Terror in the Shadows	Sarah	Made-for-TV movie directed by William A. Graham.
1995	Lois & Clark: The New Adventures of Superman	Amber Lake	Episode: "Don't Tug on Superman's Cape" (S3:E6)
1995	Cybill	Genie Francis	Episode: "As the World Turns to Crap" (S1:E3) (uncredited)
1996	The Incredible Hulk	Betty Ross	Recurring
1996	The Incredible Hulk	Sister Rose Erak	Episode: "Innocent Blood" (S1:E50)
2000	3rd Rock from the Sun	Gwen McMichael	Episode: "Gwen, Larry, Dick & Mary" (S5:E10)
2000	Oh, Baby	Rachel	Episode: "Image" (S2:E21)
2000	Roswell	Mother	Episode: "Destiny" (S1:E22)
2007	The Note	Peyton MacGruder	Made-for-TV movie directed by Douglas Barr.
2009	Taking a Chance on Love	Peyton MacGruder	Made-for-TV movie written and directed by Douglas Barr.
2011	Bar Karma	Waitress	Episode: "Three Times a Lady" (S1:E9)
2011–12	Pretty the Series	Dr. Kate	Recurring
2011–12	The Young and the Restless	Genevieve Atkinson	Contract role
2012	Notes from the Heart Healer	Peyton MacGruder	Made-for-TV movie written and directed by Douglas Barr.
2020	Quarantine	Norma	Episode: "Day 60" (S1:E25)

=== Videos ===
Year	Title	Role	Notes
1994	Luke and Laura, Vol. 1: Lovers on the Run	Host/Laura Spencer	Directed by David Seeger.
1995	Luke and Laura Vol. 2: Greatest Love of All	Host/Laura Spencer	Directed by David Seeger.

== Awards and nominations ==
List of acting awards and nominations
Year	Award	Category	Title	Result	Ref.
1979	Young Artist Award	Best Juvenile Actress in a Daytime Series	General Hospital	Nominated	
1980	Soapy Awards	Outstanding Actress	General Hospital	Nominated	
1980	Young Artist Award	Best Juvenile Actress in a Daytime Series	General Hospital	Won	
1981	Soapy Awards	Outstanding Actress	General Hospital	Won	
1982	Young Artist Award	Best Juvenile Actress in a Daytime Series	General Hospital	Nominated	
1997	Soap Opera Digest Awards	Outstanding Lead Actress in a Daytime Drama	General Hospital	Nominated	
1997	Daytime Emmy Award	Outstanding Lead Actress in a Drama Series	General Hospital	Nominated	
1997	Online Film & Television Association	Best Actress in a Daytime Serial	General Hospital	Nominated	
1999	Online Film & Television Association	Best Actress in a Daytime Serial	General Hospital	Nominated	
2000	Online Film & Television Association	Best Actress in a Daytime Serial	General Hospital	Nominated	
2002	Daytime Emmy Award	America's Favorite Couple (shared with Anthony Geary)	General Hospital	Nominated	
2006	TV Land Award	Most Wonderful Wedding (shared with Anthony Geary)	General Hospital	Nominated	
2007	Daytime Emmy Award	Outstanding Supporting Actress in a Drama Series	General Hospital	Won	
2007	Online Film & Television Association	Best Supporting Actress in a Daytime Serial	General Hospital	Nominated	
2012	Daytime Emmy Award	Outstanding Supporting Actress in a Drama Series	The Young and the Restless	Nominated	
2012	Indie Series Award	Best Supporting Actress (Comedy)	Pretty the Horses	Nominated	
2020	Soap Hub Award	Soap Hub Editors' Choice	General Hospital	Won	
2020	Soap Hub Award	Favorite General Hospital Actress	General Hospital	Nominated	
2021	Daytime Emmy Award	Outstanding Lead Actress in a Drama Series	General Hospital	Nominated	
2021	Soap Hub Award	Favorite General Hospital Actress	General Hospital	Nominated	
