= Beautiful Girl (film) =

- Written by: Jane Read Martin; Abdi Nazemian; Micah Schraft
- Directed by: Douglas Barr
- Starring: Marissa Jaret Winokur; Mark Consuelos; Fran Drescher
- Music by: Eric Allaman
- Country of origin: United States
- Original language: English

Production
- Producer: Mark Winemaker
- Running time: 80 minutes

Original release
- Network: ABC Family
- Release: October 19, 2003

Beautiful Girl is a 2003 television movie starring Marissa Jaret Winokur. The film was directed by Douglas Barr. The film premiered on ABC Family on October 19, 2003.

== Plot ==
Marissa Jaret Winokur plays Becca Wasserman, a young woman recently engaged to a young man, Adam Lopez. Hoping to improve their modest honeymoon plans, Becca seeks the vacation prize offered in a local beauty pageant. Charming and buoyant, Becca enters herself confidently, over the objections of her embarrassed mother who believes that her daughter's plus-size form will be ridiculed. Becca rejects the criticism and becomes determined to win.

Overcoming all expectations, Becca becomes Miss Squirrel Hill. The flush of success drives her to compete in other, larger pageants in the city, and she announces ambitious plans for the future. Her fiancé is supportive at first, but he becomes quickly dismayed by her aggressive efforts to win. As Becca struggles to advance in the pageant circuit, she appears to change for the worse in many ways, before finally recapturing her original good nature and joie de vivre.

== Cast ==
- Becca Wasserman – Marissa Jaret Winokur
- Amanda Wasserman – Fran Drescher
- Adam Lopez – Mark Consuelos
- Rachel Wasserman – Sarah Manninen
- Libby Leslie – Reagan Pasternak
- Supporting cast – Amanda Brugel; Barbara Radecki; Clare Stone; Charlotte Sullivan; Barbara Mamabolo; Brooke D'Orsay; Joyce Gordon; Stephanie Belding; Jordan Madley; Lesley Faulkner; Mark Leone

== Production ==
The film is set in Pittsburgh but was filmed in Toronto.
