= Family Movie Night =

- Country of origin: United States
- No. of seasons: 2
- No. of episodes: 9 (list of episodes)

Production
- Running time: 2 hours
- Production companies: P&G Productions; Flyover Studios; Telenext Media Inc. (some)

Original release
- Network: NBC; Fox (2 films)
- Release: April 16, 2010 – December 2, 2011

Related
- Walden Family Theater

Family Movie Night was an umbrella series of made for TV films owned and sponsored by Procter & Gamble and Walmart. The companies were inserting product placements within the films. Flyover Studios, P&G Productions and Telenext Media Inc. were also involved producing the films. The films were aired via time buys and developed as back door pilots but none had gone to series.

== Background ==
Procter & Gamble has been in the original content business having been involved in creating and producing the soap opera genre as a part of the early TV model of sponsored shows and other program via P&G Productions.

Previously in the late 1990s, P&G and Walmart had been launch members of the Association of National Advertisers' Alliance for Family Entertainment. The alliance pushed to get family-friendly programs like the WB's Gilmore Girls on air as they found that families with children under the age of 18 as the biggest "underserved potential viewing audience" with only short of a quarter of this group were satisfied with existing family-entertainment.

== History ==
Walmart decided on its Family Moments campaign which pushes additional whole family entertainment choices in-store, online and via TV. By early 2010, P&G and Walmart agreed to a joint marketing program in which they would have a series of commercial made-for-TV movies produced by P&G Productions to market their products. NBC was brought on board as the series' network. There were originally to be three or four films. P&G Productions supposedly budget $4.5 million to make the TV film.

With the first three doing respectable numbers, including Secrets of the Mountain winning its night, the Family Night Partners decided in December 2010 to continue the series by purchasing time on Fox instead. None of the three films spawned a series. At that time, Dear Annie was casting.

P&G Chairman and Chief Executive Bob McDonald, a supporter of the Family Movie Night, indicated that he felt that Wal-mart was not executing its part as well as they should by advertising more P&G products in circulars or store displays. After airing 5 pilot-films, P&G and Wal-Mart announced that they would continue airing four more new films for the remainder of the year 2011.

== Films ==
Film	Network	Debut	million viewers
Secrets of the Mountain	NBC	April 16, 2010	7.8
The Jensen Project	NBC	July 16, 2010	3.9
A Walk in My Shoes	NBC	December 3, 2010	4.5
Change of Plans	Fox	January 8, 2011	3.1
Truth Be Told	Fox	April 16, 2011	2.3
Field of Vision	NBC	June 11, 2011	2.8
Who Is Simon Miller?	NBC	August 6, 2011	3.3
Game Time: Tackling the Past	NBC	September 3, 2011	2.2
Game of Your Life	NBC	December 2, 2011	2.1

- Truth Be Told (Fox, Saturday April 16, 2011) was headlined by Candace Cameron Bure, David James Elliott and had a musical performance by Danny Gokey of American Idol fame and NFL star Kurt Warner cameo.
- Field of Vision, originally Magic Eye, starred Tony Oller as Tyler McFarland, the captain of the high school football team. Expect to win for his school, Tyler must decide whether or not to tell on two teammates to the coach about their bullying Cory, a new school kid. With Tyler's little sister finding a camera with magical properties related to Cory's past. The films' script is by Wesley Bishop and directed by Gregg Champion with David A. Rosemont, Brian Wells and Jeff Grant as exec producers. Alex is played by Chris Tavarez.

=== Unaired ===
- Dear Annie was casting as of December 2010 and to have started production in January 2011 in New Mexico. The film was to be about a relationship counselor and her old friend, a recent widower, who fakes being married to "curry favors from a media mogul."

== See also ==
- Product placement
