= Gary S. Scott =

American film composer

Gary Stevan Scott is an American film composer who has contributed music to over forty movies, TV shows, and television movies, beginning with the 1981 horror movie Final Exam. He has also worked a record producer, an arranger, musical director, and conductor. He has received five BMI Cable Awards for his work on The Suite Life of Zack & Cody, The Suite Life on Deck, and Beverly Hills 90210.

== Personal life ==
Scott was born in Los Angeles, California. He is a UCLA graduate, where he earned a degree in music from the College of Fine Arts.

== Partial filmography ==
Year	Film	Role	Notes
1981	Final Exam	Composer	Debut as a composer
1982-1983	Seven Brides for Seven Brothers	Composer	TV Series
1983	Deadly Force	Composer	
1985	Roadhouse 66	Composer	
1983-1987	Fame	Composer	TV Series
1987-1988	The Bronx Zoo	Composer	TV Series
1996	Walker, Texas Ranger	Composer	1 episode
1988	Fox's Fun House	Composer	TV Series
2005-2008	The Suite Life of Zack & Cody	Composer	TV Series
2008-2011	The Suite Life on Deck	Composer	TV Series

|}
