= Steve Arterburn =

American Christian counselor

- Born: Stephen Arterburn; June 18, 1953 (age 73)
- Spouse: Misty Arterburn
- Children: Madeline
- Presenting career
- Station: New Life Live
- Country: USA
- Website: www.newlife.com

Stephen "Steve" Arterburn from Ranger, Texas is the founder and chairman of New Life Ministries and host of the syndicated Christian counseling talk show New Life Live! available on XM and Sirius Satellite radio and on NRB Network. Arterburn is also the host of New Life TV, a web-based Christian ministry. Arterburn is the founder of the Women of Faith conferences. He also serves as a teaching pastor in Carmel, Indiana.

Arterburn is a public speaker and has been featured in national media venues such as Inside Edition, Good Morning America, CNN Live, USA Today, and in GQ and Rolling Stone magazines. Arterburn has spoken at major events for the National Center for Fathering, American Association of Christian Counselors, Promise Keepers Canada, Life Well Conferences in Australia and The Salvation Army.

Arterburn is an author of over two dozen Christian-themed self-help books. Along with Dr. Dave Stoop, he edited and produced the Life Recovery Bible, and Take Your Life Back.

His speaking topics address issues common to leaders, adult men and women, including Every Man’s Battle, Lose it For Life, The 7-Minute Marriage Solution, Every Heart Restored, and Healing is a Choice.

== Publications ==
- 5 Blind Spots: Blocking God's Work in You (2014) Worthy Publishing ISBN 9781617953231
- The Seven Minute Marriage Solution Devotional Bible (2013) Worthy Publishing ISBN 9781936034635
- The Seven Minute Marriage Solution (2013) Worthy Publishing ISBN 9781936034628
- Is This The One, 2012
- The Exceptional Life: 8 Powerful Steps to Experiencing God's Best for You Bethany House (2011)
- Healing is a Choice: 10 Decisions That Will Transform Your Life and 10 Lies That Can Prevent You From Making Them. (2011)
- The Encounter: Sometimes God Has to Intervene. (with John Perry, 2011, fiction)
- Walking Into Walls: 5 Blind Spots that Block God's Work in You. (2011)
- Midlife Manual for Men (2008), Bethany House
- Being Christian: Exploring Where You, God, and Life Connect (2009), Bethany House
- Regret-Free Living Bethany House (2009)
- Young Believer On Tour (2004)
- Addicted to "Love"
- Reframe Your Life
- Toxic Faith (with Jack Felton, 2001) ISBN 0-87788-825-6
- More Jesus, Less Religion (with Jack Felton)
- The One Year Book of Devotions for Men on the Go (with Bill Farrel) ISBN 0-8423-5756-4
- Lose It For Life
- The Secrets Men Keep
- Feeding Your Appetites
- Moments for Singles (with Leigh McLeroy)
- Avoiding Mr. Wrong
- Every Young Woman's Battle Workbook (with Shannon Ethridge)
- Every Man's Challenge (with Fred Stoeker and Mike Yorkey)
- Every Heart Restored (with Mike Yorkey and Fred Stoeker)
- Every Young Man, God's Man (with Mike Yorkey and Kenny Luck)
- Every Man, God's Man (with Mike Yorkey and Kenny Luck)
- Every Man's Marriage (with Fred Stoeker and Mike Yorkey)
- Every Woman's Marriage (with Shannon Ethridge)
- Every Young Woman's Battle (with Shannon Ethridge)
- Every Woman's Battle (with Shannon Ethridge)
- Every Young Man's Battle (with Fred Stoeker and Mike Yorkey)
- Every Man's Battle (with Fred Stoeker)
- Flashpoints (with Angela Elwell Hunt, 2002), Tyndale House
- Feeding Your Appetites: Take Control of What's Controlling You! (with Dr. Debra Cherry, (2004) Integrity Publishers
- Internet Protect your Kids (2007)

The Arterburn Wellness Series

- Understanding and Loving a Person with Attention Deficit Disorder (with Timothy Smith, 2017) ISBN 978-1434710550
- Understanding and Loving a Person with Bipolar Disorder (with Becky Lyke Brown, 2018) ISBN 978-0781414920
- Understanding and Loving a Person with Narcissistic Personality Disorder (with Patricia Kuhlman, 2018) ISBN 978-1434710581
- Understanding and Loving a Person with Alcohol or Drug Addiction (with David Stoop, 2019) ISBN 978-0781414913
- Understanding and Loving Your Child with ADHD (2021)

=== Fiction ===
- Healing Stones (Sullivan Crisp Series, #1), authored by Nancy Rue.
- Healing Waters (Sullivan Crisp Series, #2), authored by Nancy Rue.
- Healing Sands (Sullivan Crisp Series), authored by Nancy Rue.
- The Reluctant Prophet, authored by Nancy Rue.
- The Encounter
