= Extreme Makeover: Home Edition: How'd They Do That? =

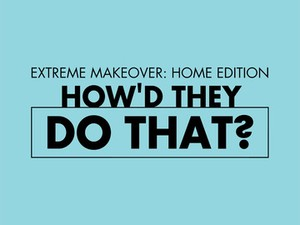
- Presented by: Ty Pennington
- Composer: Eric Allaman
- Country of origin: United States
- Original language: English
- No. of seasons: 1
- No. of episodes: 17

Production
- Running time: 40–45 minutes
- Production company: Endemol

Original release
- Network: ABC
- Release: November 1, 2004 – May 23, 2005

Related
- Extreme Makeover: Home Edition

Extreme Makeover: Home Edition: How'd They Do That? is an American reality television series that originally ran from November 1, 2004 to May 23, 2005 on ABC.

== Episodes ==
No.	Title	Original release date	Viewers (millions)
1	"Ali Family"	November 1, 2004	N/A
2	"Burns Family"	November 29, 2004	N/A
3	"Dore Family"	January 10, 2005	N/A
4	"Anderson Family"	January 17, 2005	N/A
5	"Sears Family"	January 24, 2005	N/A
6	"Mackey Family"	January 31, 2005	N/A
7	"Elcano Family"	February 7, 2005	N/A
8	"Harper Family"	February 21, 2005	N/A
9	"Harris Sextuplets"	March 7, 2005	N/A
10	"Okvath Family and University Medical Center"	March 14, 2005	N/A
11	"Leomiti-Higgins Family"	March 28, 2005	N/A
12	"Leslie Family"	April 4, 2005	N/A
13	"Broadbent Family"	April 11, 2005	N/A
14	"Harvey Family"	April 25, 2005	N/A
15	"Dolan Family"	May 2, 2005	N/A
16	"Johnson Family"	May 9, 2005	N/A
17	"Piestewa Family"	May 23, 2005	N/A
