= Bradley Pierce =

American actor

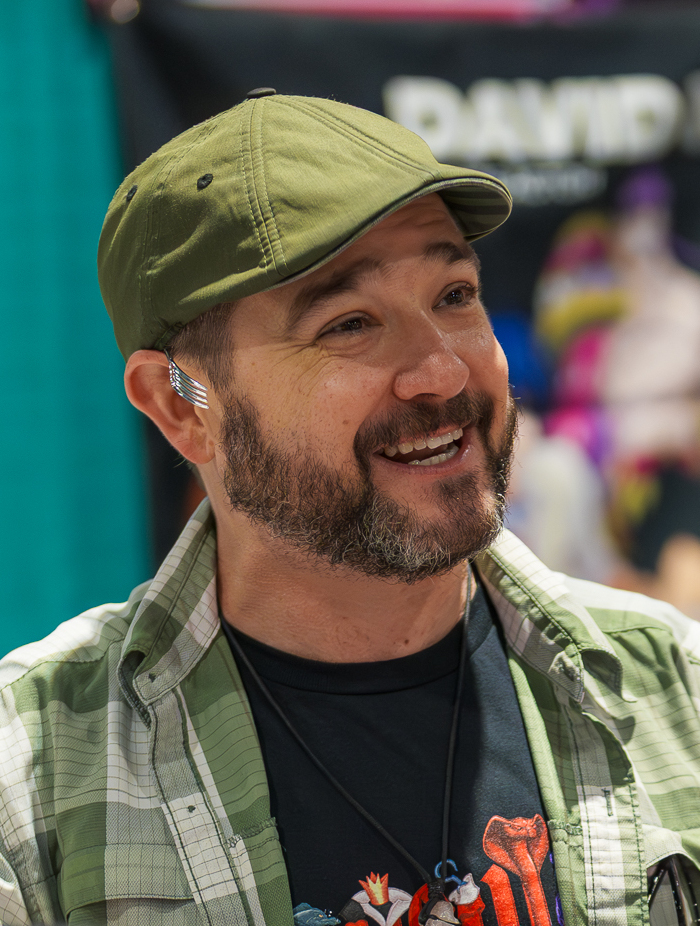
- Pierce at GalaxyCon Richmond in 2026
- Born: Bradley Michael Pierce; October 23, 1982 (age 43); Glendale, Arizona, U.S.
- Occupation: Actor
- Years active: 1990–present
- Spouse: Shari Holmes (m. 2005; div. 2017)
- Children: 3
- Website: www.mrbradleypierce.com

Bradley Michael Pierce (born October 23, 1982) is an American actor. Along with other roles and cameo appearances in television, films, direct-to-video animation, advertising, and video games, he played Peter Shepherd in Jumanji, the original voice of Chip in Beauty and the Beast, one of the original voices for Tails from the Sonic the Hedgehog franchise and Pete Lender in the 1997 film adaptation of The Borrowers.

== Career ==
Pierce began acting at age 6, and has since appeared in various projects ranging from commercial and voiceover to film and television. He played the role of Andrew Shawn Donovan IV on Days of Our Lives for just over a year. He is also known for voicing Chip in Disney's Beauty and the Beast as well as Tails in the Saturday morning cartoon series Sonic the Hedgehog.

Other roles include Peter in Jumanji and a starring role in The Borrowers with John Goodman. Pierce provided additional voices in The Busy World of Richard Scarry and appeared with Patty Duke and Melissa Gilbert in the TV film Cries from the Heart/Touch of Truth as an autistic child named Michael.

He has guest-starred on such TV shows including Life Goes On, Roseanne, Herman's Head, Mad About You, Lois & Clark: The New Adventures of Superman, Touched by an Angel, Profiler, Star Trek: Voyager, and voiced the character Nibs in the 2002 film Return to Never Land.

In addition to acting, Pierce produces short films and new media "Geek" content with the production company "ZFO Entertainment", a company he started with his friend and fellow actor Joey Zimmerman. They primarily work as a press/media outlet, in addition to producing their own short film content. Their first short film, "Vultures", released in 2016.

Outside of film-making, Pierce is the co-founder of Pierce & Luna, a cocktail community geared towards bartending education and liquor reviews. Along with his partner, Bella Luna, Pierce provides bartending services and consultations for elite parties. They also provide custom speciality cocktails for festivals such as the Hollywood Burlesque Festival and the Hollywood Fringe Festival.

== Personal life ==
Pierce married Shari Holmes in 2005; they had three children. Holmes filed for divorce from Pierce in 2015; the divorce was finalized in 2017.

== Filmography ==
=== Film ===
Year	Title	Role	Notes
1990	Cartel	Tommy	Uncredited
1991	Beauty and the Beast	Chip (voice)	
1992	Chaplin	Sydney Chaplin Jr. (Age 8)	
1992	Porco Rosso	Gas Boy (voice)	English version
1993	Man's Best Friend	Chet	
1995	Jumanji	Peter Shepherd	
1995	Whisper of the Heart	High School Student (voice)	English version
1996	Amanda	Medieval Boy	
1996	The Undercover Kid	Max Anderson	
1997	The Borrowers	Peter Lender	
2000	Down to You	Ricky James	
2001	Pearl Harbor	Additional voices	Uncredited
2001	Crazy/Beautiful	Additional voices	Uncredited
2001	Riding in Cars with Boys	Additional voices	Uncredited
2002	Big Trouble	Additional voices	Uncredited
2002	The Cat Returns	Additional voices	
2004	Harold & Kumar Get the Munchies	Additional voices	Uncredited
2008	College Road Trip	Additional voices	Uncredited
2008	High School Musical 3: Senior Year	Additional voices	Uncredited
2013	Phantom	Loop group voice	
2013	The Internship	Additional voices	
2015	In Good Faith	Father Francis	Short film
2015	My All-American	Additional voices	
2016	Blind	Charlie Weaver	Short film; also producer
2018	Deacon	Lt. Linus Carter	Also producer
2019	Detective Pikachu	Additional voices	
2020	The Connectionist	Bradley	Short film

=== Television ===
Year	Title	Role	Notes
1990	Too Young to Die?	Web	Television film
1990	Casey's Gift: For Love of a Child	Casey Stillwell	Television film
1990	Timeless Tales from Hallmark	Boy Rabbit (voice)	Episode: "The Emperor's New Clothes"
1990	Life Goes On	Boy	Episode: "The Visitor"
1990–1991	Days of Our Lives	Andrew Donovan	26 episodes
1991	Beverly Hills, 90210	Drew	Episode: "Halloween"
1991	Nurses	Jimmy	Episode: "Begone with the Wind"
1991	Roseanne	Jason	Episode: "Santa Claus"
1992–1993	Shaky Ground	Dylan Moody	17 episodes
1993	Herman's Head	Brad	Episode: "Love and the Single Parent"
1993	Mad About You	Jed	Episode: "The Unplanned Child"
1993–1994	The Little Mermaid	Various voices	4 episodes
1993–1994	Sonic the Hedgehog	Tails (voice)	26 episodes
1993–1995	The Pink Panther	Buddy Bimmel's Son (voice)	41 episodes
1994–1996	The Busy World of Richard Scarry	Various voices	45 episodes
1994	Lois & Clark: The New Adventures of Superman	Kid #1	Episode: "Witness"
1994	Picket Fences	Joey Messina	Episode: "Supreme Courting"
1994	The Yarn Princess	Joshua 'Josh' Thomas	Television film
1994	Dead Man's Revenge	Young Tom Hatcher	Television film
1994	Children of the Dark	Little Boy	Television film
1994	Ride with the Wind	Danny Barnes	Television film
1994	Cries from the Heart	Michael	Television film
1995	The Client	Ryan Nichols	Episode: "The Prodigal Father"
1996	The Home Court	Patrick Shaughnessy	Episode: "Between a Shamrock and a Hard Place"
1996	The Oz Kids	Boris (voice)	
1996	The Siege at Ruby Ridge	Sammy Weaver	Television film
1997	Touched by an Angel	Hank Monroe	Episode: "Have You Seen Me?"
1997	Doom Runners	Adam	Television film
1998	Mr. Show with Bob and David	Young Otto	Episode: "Like Chickens... Delicious Chickens"
1999	Profiler	Jeff	Episode: "Inheritance"
1999	Star Trek: Voyager	Jason Janeway	Episode: "11:59"
1999	Chicken Soup for the Soul	Trip	Episode: "Blind Date with Belinda"
2000	As Told by Ginger	Darren Patterson (voice)	Episode: "The Party"
2000	The Wild Thornberrys	Shango (voice)	2 episodes
2002	Return to Never Land	Nibs (voice)	
2008	Camp Rock	Additional voices	Television film; uncredited
2015	Andy the Android Dick	N/A	Co-executive producer (8 episodes)
2015	Up in Smoke	Adam	Television film

=== Video games ===
Year	Title	Role	Notes
2005	Tony Hawk's American Wasteland	Skateclub 4	
2005	Kingdom Hearts II	Additional voices	English version
2007	Peter Pan	Nibs	
2014	The Lego Movie Videogame	Good Cop / Bad Cop	Replacing Liam Neeson

== Production credits ==
=== Producer ===
Year	Title	Role	Notes
2015	Finding Forty-Eight	Associate producer	Short film
