= DeAnna Robbins =

American actress (born 1959)

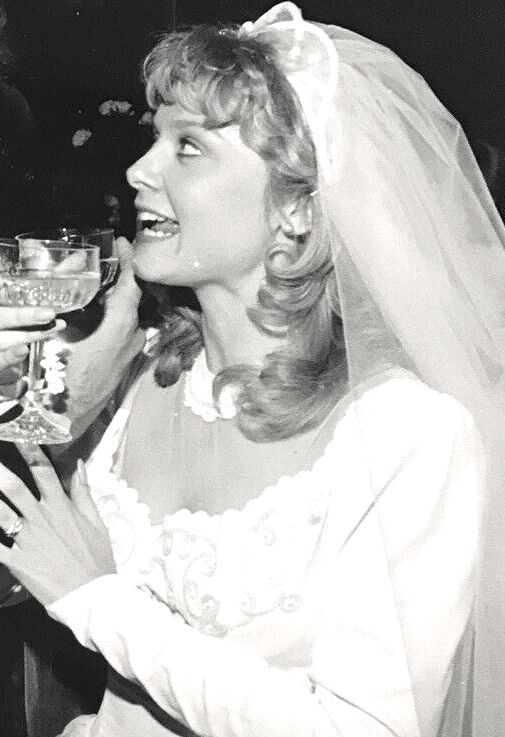
- DeAnna in 1983
- Born: June 15, 1959 (age 66); DeKalb, Illinois, U.S.
- Occupation: Actress
- Years active: 1981–1988

DeAnna Robbins (born June 15, 1959) is an American former actress known for her role as Lisa in the 1981 slasher film Final Exam, and for her role as Cindy Lake on the soap opera The Young and the Restless. She also appeared as Diane Parker on Days of Our Lives and as Kathleen McDougal on the NBC series Santa Barbara.

== History ==
=== Early life ===
DeAnna was raised in Tempe, Arizona.

=== Film and television career ===
DeAnna made her film debut in the slasher film Final Exam, followed by a regular guest starring role as Cindy Lake on The Young and the Restless.

She also guest-starred in many television shows and soap operas throughout the 1980s, including Eight Is Enough, Mr. Merlin, The Young and the Restless, Hotel, Matt Houston, Days of Our Lives, Crazy Like A Fox, and Finder of Lost Loves. She also portrayed the character of Aimee Godsey in three television film spin-offs of The Waltons.

DeAnna married Chester Letsinger in 1983 while filming The Young and the Restless.

=== Retirement and career shift ===
In 1994, DeAnna retired from acting and began a career as a realtor in Arizona. However, she has occasionally performed on stage: In 2000, she starred in a production of Beyond Therapy at the Phoenix Little Theatre as well as two 2001 productions of Israel Horovitz plays, Hopscotch and It's Called the Sugar Plum, staged at the Tempe Ensemble Theatre.

== Filmography ==
Year	Title	Role	Notes
1981	Eight Is Enough	Darlene Scott	Episode: "The Darlene Dilemma"
1981	Final Exam	Lisa	
1982–1983	The Young and the Restless	Cindy Lake	Television series
1981	Mr. Merlin	Susan	Episode: "Pilot"
1981	Return of the Rebels	Amy Allen	Television film
1982	A Wedding on Walton's Mountain	Aimee Godsey	Television film
1982	Mother's Day on Waltons Mountain	Aimee Godsey	Television film
1982	A Day for Thanks on Walton's Mountain	Aimee Godsey	Television film
1983	Hotel	Donna Corry	Episode: "Faith, Hope & Charity"
1984	Matt Houston	Linda Karlin	Episode: "The Monster"
1984–1985	Days of Our Lives	Diane Parker	
1985	Crazy Like a Fox		
1985	Finder of Lost Loves	Robin, Stacey's Friend	Episode: "Deadly Silence"
1986	Silver Spoons	Wendy	Episode: "One for the Road: Part 2"
1987–1988	Santa Barbara	Kathleen McDougall	17 episodes
