= Final Exam (1981 film) =

Film by Jimmy Huston

- Promotional film poster
- Directed by: Jimmy Huston
- Written by: Jimmy Huston
- Produced by: John L. Chambliss; Myron Meisel
- Starring: Cecile Bagdadi; Joel S. Rice
- Cinematography: Darrell Catchart
- Edited by: John A. O'Connor
- Music by: Gary S. Scott
- Distributed by: Motion Picture Marketing
- Release date: February 27, 1981
- Running time: 90 minutes
- Country: United States
- Language: English
- Budget: $363,000
- Box office: $1.3 million

Final Exam is a 1981 American slasher film written and directed by Jimmy Huston. Starring Cecile Bagdadi and Joel S. Rice, the plot follows a nameless killer stalking the remaining group of students left on a college campus days before the beginning of summer vacation.

Filmed in North Carolina and South Carolina with a cast of largely Los Angeles-based actors, Final Exam was released by Motion Picture Marketing on February 27, 1981, to mixed reviews.

== Plot ==
One night at March College, a young couple is making out in a parked vehicle. An unseen assailant slices the vehicle's roof open and murders them both.

Meanwhile, the nearby Lanier College is preparing for its final exam date. To ensure a group of students ace their chemistry final, a fraternity stages a shooting on campus so the students have more time to study. The prank works, leaving a small number of students on campus until the following day's final. Meanwhile, the murderer responsible for the March College killings arrives on campus in a van and begins stalking the remaining students.

Bookish Courtney is studying hard for her exams, while her wealthy roommate Lisa is preparing to leave for her home in NYC. Lisa is also having an affair with one of her professors, Dr. Reynolds. Gary, a pledge for Gamma Delta, suffers from a prank in which he is bound to a tree for the night. The murderer unties him, jumps down from the tree, then eviscerates him with a knife. Gary's girlfriend, Janet, arrives, notices a silhouette on a building rooftop in the distance, and follows, believing it to be Gary. When she realizes it is not her lover, she attempts to flee, but the killer grabs and murders her.

Another Gamma member, Wildman, is lured into a darkened gymnasium while attempting to steal prescription drugs from the football coach's office. The murderer appears and physically overpowers Wildman, beating and dragging him to a weight-lifting machine where he is then garroted. Another student named Mark discovers Wildman's body and is subsequently chased by the murderer into the school's electrical building. The murderer jumps out of a barrel and stabs Mark, killing him. Nerdy student Radish discovers the carnage and calls the police, but they dismiss him as a prankster. Radish rushes to warn Courtney of the imminent danger, but is murdered by the killer who is already inside her room.

Courtney returns to her dormitory, where she discovers Radish's body pinned to her door. Terrified, she attempts to alert her dormitory, but everyone has gone home for the break. Lisa waits for Dr. Reynolds in the school's conservatory, but the murderer enters the room and stabs her to death. Courtney arrives shortly after and sees her corpse. The murderer pursues Courtney. She arms herself with a kitchen knife and then takes refuge in the campus's clock tower. Alarmed by her rampant pleas for help, a coach arrives, shooting an arrow at the murderer. He catches it and impales it into his chest, killing him. The killer gets his foot stuck in the damaged flooring as Courtney bashes him with a wood plank. He falls to the first floor. Courtney cautiously walks past, and the murderer grabs her ankle. Using his knife, she stabs him 12 times, ultimately killing him.

== Cast ==
- Cecile Bagdadi as Courtney
- Joel S. Rice as Radish
- Ralph Brown as Wildman
- DeAnna Robbins as Lisa
- Sherry Willis-Burch as Janet
- John Fallon as Mark
- Terry W. Farren as Gary
- Timothy L. Raynor as Killer
- Sam Kilman as Sheriff
- Don Hepner as Dr. Reynolds
- Mary Ellen Withers as Elizabeth
- Jerry Rushing as Coach
- R.C. Nanney as Mitch

== Production ==
The majority of the cast on Final Exam were L.A. stage actors. The film's lead, Cecile Bagdadi, was cast after she was seen performing in a production of Faces on the Wall at the Coronet Theatre. The film was shot over six weeks from September 15, 1980, to October 25, 1980 at E.O. Studios in Shelby. Additional photography took place at Limestone College in Gaffney, and Isothermal Community College in Spindale. The film's budget was approximately $363,000.

== Music ==
Final Exam

Soundtrack album by Gary S. Scott
- Released: 1981
- Genre: Film score
- Length: 34:47
- Label: AEI Records

An official score was released for the film in 1981 by AEI Records.

=== Track listing ===
No.	Title	Length
1.	"Main Title"	1:08
2.	"On the Prowl"	1:43
3.	"Love Theme"	0:47
4.	"Stealing the Exam"	0:50
5.	"Mighty House of Gamma"	4:18
6.	"Art in the Dark"	1:14
7.	"Sweet Young Girls"	2:02
8.	"The Wrong Answer"	5:42
9.	"The Executionist Song"	0:48
10.	"The Massacre"	2:30
11.	"Courtney and Radish"	2:09
12.	"The Chase"	7:49
13.	"End Title"	3:47

== Release ==
Final Exam received a limited regional release on February 27, 1981, screening in St. Louis, Missouri and Dayton, Ohio. It continued to screen regionally throughout the spring before having its Los Angeles premiere on June 5.

== Home media ==
Embassy Home Entertainment released Final Exam on VHS in 1983. The film was first released on DVD by BCI on September 23, 2008, and was later released by Scorpion Releasing on September 20, 2011. The film was released for the first time on Blu-ray by Scream Factory on May 13, 2014.

== Reception and legacy ==
=== Box office ===
The film was a minor commercial success, grossing $1.3 million in the United States. Per a June 26 report from Variety, the film was ranked number 7 at the U.S. box office at that date.

=== Critical response ===
Hal Lipper of Dayton Daily News compared the film positively to Halloween (1978) stating that he found the film to be "slicker" and "better acted" than the latter but less scary due to the killer frequently being shown. Hal also went on to praise the camerawork: "A welcome addition to Final Exam, however is its competent camerawork. It's a polished, professional effort that bellies its $363,000 budget, although a couple of hand-held camera shots at the film's finale might have heightened its impact". He then wrote that the performances of Cecile and Joel were highlights of the film. Linda Gross of The Los Angeles Times gave the film a middling review, noting that it "vacillate[s] between the college-prank humor of an Animal House and a killer-thriller like Prom Night". Gene Siskel of the Chicago Tribune deemed the film a "rip-off" of Halloween (1978), characterized by "standard stalking-shots as the camera rolls in on the girls as they cower in terror in hallways and classrooms". TV Guide called the film "dull" and "virtually bloodless", panning the film's dialogue heavy scenes. The Baltimore Evening Sun's Lou Cedrone panned the film, writing: "The script never explains who the murderer is or why he's doing the killing... The most horrifying thing about it is the behavior of the fraternity boys, and the only really commendable thing about it is that the killings are handled with restraint".

The Courier-Journal's Gregg Swem noted that the film "reeks of cheapness", with "childish" dialogue, though he conceded that the film "succeeds at scaring. There are some suspenseful moments that linger mercilessly".

=== Modern assessment ===
The film has received a modern reevaluation by critics for the arbitrary villain and its focus on character development rather than gore and shock value. The central male character in the film, Radish, served as partial inspiration for the character of Randy Meeks in Wes Craven's Scream (1996). AllMovie called it "a hybrid of frat-boy comedy and slasher-thriller exploitation which features no slashing, no humor and fails to exploit anything". Brett Gallman from horror review website Oh, the Horror! gave the film a positive review. Complimenting the film's characterizations, and slow mounting tension while also criticizing the murders as uninventive and long stretch before the murders occur.

In Legacy of Blood: A Comprehensive Guide to Slasher Movies, film scholar Jim Harper notes that the film takes "the autonomous face of the slasher movie killer to the extreme: the man terrorizing the teenagers is shown on screen, but he has no name, no connection to his victims, no history is ever given, nor any motive. He simply appears, begins killing, and is defeated". He also notes the film's shortcomings in character development, writing: "If the rest of the characters had been as well drawn as Radish, then Final Exam might well have been a minor classic. As it is, they're all stereotypical jocks and cheerleaders, and ultimately forgettable".

On the review aggregator website Rotten Tomatoes, 13% of 8 critics' reviews are positive, with an average rating of 4/10.

=== Themes ===
Todd Gilchrist of IGN notes elements of homoeroticism in the film, particularly its depiction of hazing rituals among the fraternity: "What's problematic about this kind of idiosyncratic behavior isn't that it's homoerotic, but that it doesn't mean anything in the movie and never connects to anything else that happens... Nerds, jocks, and nubile co-eds are all integral parts of the slasher-movie mythos, but none of those character types are used to any effect other than expanding the body count once the killings actually begin". Ian Jane of DVD Talk makes a similar observation of the film in a retrospective review.

=== In other media ===
The trailer for this film appeared in the 2020 compilation film AGFA Horror Trailer Show.

== Novelization ==
A mass market paperback novelization of the same name, written by Geoffrey Meyer, was published by Pinnacle Books in 1981. It later went out of print. The novelization further expands on the development of the characters, including the couple who are murdered at the beginning of the film. While the couple are nameless in the film, this adaptation reveals their names to be Dana and John and provides them with a backstory. Additionally, the novelization hints at the motivation of the killer which is never explained in the film.

== See also ==
- List of American films of 1981
- List of horror films set in academic institutions

== Sources ==
- Albright, Brian (2012). Regional Horror Films, 1958-1990: A State-by-State Guide with Interviews. Jefferson, North Carolina: McFarland. ISBN 978-0-786-47227-7.
- Harper, Jim (2004). Legacy of Blood: A Comprehensive Guide to Slasher Movies. Manchester, England: Critical Vision. ISBN 978-1-900-48639-2.
- Muir, John Kenneth (2012). Horror Films of the 1980s. Vol. 1. Jefferson, North Carolina: McFarland. ISBN 978-0-786-47298-7. OCLC 840902442.
- Newman, Kim (2011). Nightmare Movies: Horror on Screen Since the 1960s. London, England: Bloomsbury. ISBN 978-1-408-80503-9.
- Nowell, Richard (2012). Blood Money: A History of the First Teen Slasher Film Cycle. New York City, New York: Bloomsbury. ISBN 978-1-441-12496-8.
