= Sleeping with the Devil (film) =

1997 American television film

- Genre: Drama
- Written by: Ellen Weston
- Directed by: William A. Graham
- Starring: Shannen Doherty; Tim Matheson
- Music by: Chris Boardman
- Country of origin: United States
- Original language: English

Production
- Executive producers: Joel S. Rice; Eric Schiff
- Producer: Jeffrey Morton
- Cinematography: Robert Steadman
- Editor: Scott Powell
- Running time: 96 min.
- Production companies: NBC Studios (in association with); WildRice Productions

Original release
- Network: CBS
- Release: April 22, 1997

Sleeping with the Devil is a 1997 American television film directed by William A. Graham. The film is based upon the book of the same name by Suzanne Finstad.

== Plot ==
Rebecca Dubrovich is a nurse, who was brutally raped years ago. Ever since, she has been skeptical about dating men, and instead focuses on her work and her training for the Santa Barbara triathlon. Her life and outlook on love changes when she meets and falls in love with billionaire Dick Strang, the owner of a large fitness chain. Rebecca opens up to Dick about her past, admitting that she was a rebellious girl for a while and got caught up in drugs. Dick helps her leave the past behind, while getting involved in a romantic relationship with her. Not long after their first meeting, Dick asks her to give up med school and move to Houston for him. Rebecca finishes up her semester and heads out to Houston, where she is talked into becoming the image of Dick's fitness company.

One night, a lady knocks on her door, and reveals herself to be Dick's wife, Dina. Rebecca immediately leaves Dick, despite his claims that he is only married to Dina for tax purposes. After Dina files for divorce, Rebecca agrees to reconcile with Dick. She breaks up with Dick again, when he becomes obsessed with winning the divorce case. Rebecca advises Dick to give Dina the money that she is suing him for, but Dick is intent on winning the case. Dick's sister Liz warns Rebecca that her brother is a liar and a sadist, and that she is better off without him, but Rebecca feels that she should stand by him during trial. Dick becomes more stressed and frustrated during the trial and goes to great lengths to succeed. He even tries to convince his best friend to lie in court, by saying that he had an affair with Dina. When he loses the case, he takes it out on Rebecca, who has just recently announced that she is pregnant with his child. She leaves Dick after he hits her, but he demands that she have an abortion and accuses her of having an affair. Liz sets her up in a new house with the furniture that Dick gave her sometime ago, though Dick soon sues Rebecca for grand theft. His attorney offers to drop the charges if Rebecca signs a contract stating that Dick is not the father of her child, but she refuses. Rebecca tells her parents, Wes and Stasha, that she would rather go to jail than have her child born into a lie. She starts a job as a nurse at a local hospital, but during a shift, she miscarries.

Meanwhile, Dick has a private detective locate her new apartment, takes back his furniture, and continues to stalk Rebecca, even sending her threats. Wes receives a phone call from a man, Tom, who offers him $20,000 to get Rebecca out of town, warning him that something terrible could happen to his daughter if he does not listen. The next day, Rebecca leaves for work, and she is shot several times by a hitman. She survives the ordeal, but is paralyzed from the chest down, and is told that she will never walk again. Dick tracks her down and hires a female contract killer, who poses as a nurse, and unsuccessfully tries to give Rebecca a lethal injection. Rebecca presses charges, but Dick is out on the streets in no time. Feeling defeated, she primarily focuses on her recovery. She starts working as a nurse for Dr. Jerrold Petrofsky, a surgeon, who specializes in the recovery of paralyzed people. Together, they work on new ideas of helping paralyzed people walk again, and they fall in love during the process. Meanwhile, police catch Dick in his attempt to flee the country. Dick is put on trial, and in the end, Rebecca wins and is granted over $28 million. She uses the money for her recovery and is finally able to walk again. She even walks in the marathon she trained for in the past. She then walks down the aisle of her wedding to Jerrold.

== Cast ==
- Shannen Doherty as Rebecca Dubrovich
- Tim Matheson as Dick Strang
- Bonnie Bartlett as Stasha Dubrovich
- Steve Eastin as Wes Dubrovich
- David Bowe as Dr. Jerrold Petrofsky
- Janet Graham as Dina Strang
