= Angela Elwell Hunt =

American novelist (born 1957)

- Born: December 20, 1957 (age 68); Winter Haven, Florida, U.S.
- Education: Rockledge High School; Liberty University
- Occupation: Author
- Spouse: Gary Hunt
- Children: 2
- Website: www.angelahuntbooks.com

Angela Elwell Hunt (born December 20, 1957) is a prolific Christian author, and her books include The Tale of Three Trees, The Debt, The Note, and The Nativity Story, among others. She also publishes novels under the name "Angela Hunt."

== Biography ==
=== Career ===
Angela Elwell Hunt was born in Winter Haven and grew up in Brevard County, Florida, graduating from Rockledge High School in 1975. She was also one of Brevard County's debutantes in that year. In 1976-77 she traveled with Derric Johnson's "The Re'Generation," a ten-member vocal group. Hunt studied English and music at Liberty University and graduated magna cum laude in 1980. She spent one year teaching high school. In 1983, she began her writing career. In those early years as a freelance writer she wrote everything from business letters to catalog copy. In the late 1980s, she received her first recognition as a writer, winning first place in a national competition with a manuscript and sketches that she and a friend submitted. Her first book was published in 1988.

Hunt has published over one hundred fifty books since then, most of which have a Christian theme. Hunt considers her some of her books to be parables. Her books have touched on such diverse topics as cloning, immortality, prion diseases, breast cancer, mental illness, angels, family issues, spouse abuse, stuttering, adoption, divorce, dating, and man's relationship to animals. Nearly five million copies of her books have been sold worldwide.

Her novel The Note was made into a Hallmark Channel movie with the same name which premiered in December 2007, and two other novels have been optioned for film (Uncharted and The Elevator). Hunt was awarded an Angel Award from Excellence in Media eight times, as well as a 2000 Christy Award (for By Dawn's Early Light). She won the 2006 Romantic Times BookClub Lifetime Achievement Award, and three of her novels have been finalists for a Romance Writers of America RITA Award. She has also been awarded the 2000 Holt Medallion for Inspirational Fiction for The Truth Teller. Her novel "The Face" was listed in Publishers Weekly "Best Books of the Year" (PW, 11/03/08).

Hunt often speaks and teaches at major writer's conferences, including the Mt. Hermon Christian Writer's Conference, the Florida Christian Writer's Conference, the Greater Philadelphia Christian Writer's Conference, the Colorado Christian Writer's Conference, and the Oregon Christian Writer's Conference. She participates as a founding instructor in the Glen Eyrie Writer's Summit, and has served as keynote speaker at the American Christian Fiction Writers conference, the Christian Writer's Guild Conference, the InScribe Christian Writers' Fellowship conference, the Liberty University Writers' Conference, and the Oregon Christian Writers Conference.

In 2013, Hunt established Angela Hunt Photography and began to develop a second part-time career, indulging her passion for learning and photography. She specializes in portraits and says she owes her interest in this career to her work as a volunteer photographer for shelter animals. She is also a photographer for Now I Lay Me Down to Sleep, an organization that provides beautiful, compassionate portraits for families whose infants experience only a brief time on earth.

=== Personal life ===
In 2006, Hunt earned a Masters of Biblical Studies degree in Theology. In 2008, she completed her doctorate in the same subject, and in 2015 she completed her Th.D.

Hunt is married to a Baptist minister, Gary Hunt. They have two children, a daughter, Taryn, and a son, Tyler. She and her family live in Clearwater, Florida with mastiffs—in 2001, one of her dogs was featured on Live With Regis and Kelly as the second largest dog in America. Hunt is passionate about her hobby of photographing shelter animals and has written short e-books for others who would like to contribute in the same way, Snapping Shelter Dogs and Snapping Shelter Cats.

== Bibliography ==
=== Picture books ===
- The Chicken Who Loved Books, HuntHaven Press, Summer 2018
- Nat the Brat, HuntHaven Press, December 2013
- Bathtime for Brandon, HuntHaven Press, July 2013
- Pretzels by the Dozen, HuntHaven Press, June 2013
- Peter McPossum's Wiggles and Giggles, HuntHaven Press, June 2013
- Too Many Tutus, HuntHaven Press, June 2013
- The Sleeping Rose, Tommy Nelson, September 1998
- Howie Hugemouth, Standard Publishing, June 1993.
- Pretzels by the Dozen, Zondervan Publishing, 2002, 2013
- The True Princess, D.C. Cook, 1992; Charisma Kids 2004
- The Singing Shepherd, Lion Publishing, 1992, new edition 2020.
- Calico Bear, Tyndale House, 1991, 2013
- A Gift For Grandpa, D.C. Cook, September 1991
- The Tale of Three Trees, Lion Publishing, 1989
- If I Had Long, Long Hair, Abingdon Press, 1988, 2013

=== Middle-grade titles ===
==== The Young Believers series ====
with Stephen Arterburn, Tyndale House Publishers, May 2004

- Josiah, book one
- Liane, book two
- Noah, book three
- Paige, book four
- Shane, book five
- Taz, book six

==== The Colonial Captives ====
juvenile historical fiction, Tyndale House

- Books 1 and 2: Kimberly and the Captives, 1996
- Books 3 and 4: The Deadly Chase, 1996

==== The Cassie Perkins Series, Tyndale House ====
- A Forever Friend, 1991
- A Basket of Roses, 1991
- No More Broken Promises, 1991
- A Dream to Cherish, 1992
- The Much-Adored Sandy Shore, 1992
- Love Burning Bright, 1992
- Star Light, Star Bright, 1993
- The Chance of a Lifetime, 1993
- The Glory of Love, 1993

==== Other ====
- Got God?, HuntHaven Press, 2013.
- Christian Friendship Bracelets Activity Pack, text, Tyndale House, 1996.
- When Your Parents Pull Apart, Tyndale House, 1995
- Where Dragons Dance, Wendy Pye Ltd., 1995,
- Beauty from the Inside Out, Becoming the Best You Can Be, Co-authored With Laura Krauss Calenberg, Thomas Nelson, July 1993
- If God Is Real, Where On Earth Is He? Here's Life, 1991
- Sit. Stay. Forever. Hunt Haven Press, 2020. A gift book about the bond between dogs and their owners.

==== The Nicki Holland Series ====
Thomas Nelson. Reprint editions issued 2005

- The Case of the Mystery Mark, 1991
- The Case of the Teenage Terminator, 1991
- The Case of the Phantom Friend, 1991
- The Case of the Terrified Track Star, 1992
- The Case of the Counterfeit Cash, 1992
- The Case of the Haunting Of Lowell Lanes, 1992
- The Case of the Birthday Bracelet, 1993
- The Secret of Cravenhill Castle, 1993
- The Riddle of Baby Rosalind, 1993

==== Dating ====
- Now That You've Asked Her Out, Here's Life/Thomas Nelson, 1989
- Now That He's Asked You Out, Here's Life/Thomas Nelson, 1989

=== General nonfiction ===
- Write Well, volume 1, HuntHaven Press, 2025.
- Write Well, volume 2, HuntHaven Press, 2026.
- Show and Tell, HuntHaven Press, 2025.
- Beginning and Ending Your Novel, HuntHaven Press, 2024.
- The Business of Writing, HuntHaven Press, 2024.
- The First Fifty Pages, HuntHaven Press, 2023.
- The Art of Revision, HuntHaven Press, 2023.
- Star of Wonder: An Advent Devotional to Illuminate the People, Places, and Purpose of the First Christmas, Bethany House, 2023.
- Writing the Picture Book, HuntHaven Press, 2020.
- Dogs Having a Ball, HuntHaven Press, 2018.
- Writing Lessons from the Front; the First Ten Books, HuntHaven Press, 2015.
- The Fiction Writer's Book of Checklists, Writing Lessons from the Front series, HuntHaven Press, 2014.
- Writing Historical Fiction, Writing Lessons from the Front series, HuntHaven Press, 2014.
- Tension on the Line, Writing Lessons from the Front series, HuntHaven Press, 2014.
- The Plot Skeleton: Book 1, Writing Lessons from the Front series, HuntHaven Press, 2013.
- Creating Extraordinary Characters, book 2, Writing Lessons from the Front series, HuntHaven Press, 2013.
- Track Down the Weasel Words, Writing Lessons from the Front series, HuntHaven Press, 2013.
- Point of View, Writing Lessons from the Front series, HuntHaven Press, 2013.
- Evoking Emotions, Writing Lessons from the Front series, HuntHaven Press, 2013.
- Plans and Processes To Get Your Book Written, Writing Lessons from the Front series, HuntHaven Press, 2013.
- A Christian Writer's Possibly Useful Ruminations on a Life in Pages, Writing Lessons from the Front series, HuntHaven Press, 2013.
- Snapping Shelter Dogs. . . and Cats!, Using Your Camera to Help Shelter Animals Find New Homes, Angela Hunt Communications, 2014.
- My Life as a Middle School Mom, Servant Books, 2000.
- Loving Someone Else's Child, Tyndale House, 1992
- The Adoption Option, Victor Books, 1989
- Too Old To Ride, Too Young To Drive, Here's Life/Thomas Nelson, 1988
- Just a Country Preacher, biography of B.R. Lakin, The Old Time Gospel Hour, 1986

=== Adult fiction ===
==== Single-title novels ====
- The Glades, Hunt Haven Press, 2026.
- A Most Peculiar Providence, Hunt Haven Press, 2026.
- What a Wave Must Be, Focus on the Family/Tyndale, 2023.
- Paul, Apostle of Christ, the novelization of the major motion picture, Bethany House Publishers, 2018.
- Risen, the novelization of the major motion picture, Bethany House Publishers, 2015.
- Passing Strangers, HuntHaven Press, May 2014.
- The Offering, Howard, 2013.
- Five Miles South of Peculiar, Howard, 2012.
- The Fine Art of Insincerity, Howard, 2011.
- Let Darkness Come, Mira, 2009.
- Taking a Chance on Love, Tyndale House, 2009, a novelization of the Hallmark movie written by Douglas Barr.
- The Face, Mira/Harlequin, 2008.
- The Nativity Story, a novelization based on the screenplay by Mike Rich, Tyndale House, 2006.
- The Elevator, Steeple Hill/Harlequin, 2007.
- Uncharted, Thomas Nelson, 2006.
- Magdalene, Tyndale House, 2005.
- A Time to Mend, Steeple Hill, 2006 (formerly Gentle Touch).
- The Novelist, Thomas Nelson, 2006.
- Unspoken, Thomas Nelson, 2005.
- The Awakening, Thomas Nelson, 2004.
- The Debt, Thomas Nelson, 2004.
- The Canopy, Thomas Nelson, 2003.
- The Shadow Women, Warner, 2002.
- The Pearl, Thomas Nelson, 2003.
- The Justice, Thomas Nelson, 2002.
- Then Comes Marriage, with Bill Myers, Zondervan Publishing, 2001.
- The Note, Thomas Nelson, 2001.
- The Story Jar, “The Yellow Sock,” a novella in an anthology written with Robin Lee Hatcher and Deborah Bedford, Multnomah, 2001.
- The Immortal, Thomas Nelson, 2000.
- The Truth Teller, Bethany House, 1999.
- Flee the Darkness, with Grant Jeffrey, Thomas Nelson, 1998.
- By Dawn’s Early Light, with Grant Jeffrey, Thomas Nelson, 1999.
- The Spear of Tyranny, with Grant Jeffrey, Thomas Nelson, 2000.
- Gentle Touch, Bethany House, 1997.
- The Proposal, Tyndale House, 1996.

=== Series ===
==== The Matriarchs series, Bethany House ====
- Rescued Heart: The Story of Sarah, 2025.
- Unwavering Heart: The Story of Rebekah, 2026.
- Devoted Heart: The Story of Leah, 2027.

==== The Emissaries series, Bethany House ====
- The Daughter of Rome, 2024.
- The Woman from Lydia, 2023.
- The Sisters of Corinth, 2024.

==== The Jerusalem Road series, Bethany House ====
- Daughter of Cana, 2020.
- The Shepherd's Wife, 2020.
- A Woman of Words, 2021.
- The Apostle's Sister, 2022.

==== The Silent Years series, Bethany House ====
- Egypt's Sister, 2017.
- Judah's Wife, 2018.
- Jerusalem's Queen, 2018.
- King's Shadow, 2019.

==== The Dangerous Beauty series, Bethany House ====
- Esther, 2015
- Bathsheba, 2015
- Delilah, 2016

==== The Fairlawn Funeral Home series ====
- Doesn't She Look Natural?, Hunt Haven Press, 2007.
- She Always Wore Red, Hunt Haven Press, 2008.
- She's In a Better Place, Hunt Haven Press, 2008.

==== The Heirs of Cahira O’Connor Series, Waterbrook ====
- The Silver Sword, 1998
- The Golden Cross, 1998
- The Velvet Shadow, 1999
- The Emerald Isle, 1999

==== The Keepers of the Ring Series ====
- Roanoke: The Lost Colony, 1996.
- Jamestown, 1996.
- Hartford, 1996.
- Rehoboth, 1997.
- Charles Towne, 1998.

==== Legacies of the Ancient River series ====
- Dreamers, Hunt Haven Press, 1996.
- Brothers, Hunt Haven Press, 1997.
- Journey, Hunt Haven Press, 1997.

==== The Theyn Chronicles, Tyndale House ====
- Afton of Margate Castle, Hunt Haven Press, 1993.
- The Troubadour's Quest, Hunt Haven Press, 1994.
- Ingram of the Irish, Hunt Haven Press, 1994.

==== The Heavenly Daze series co-authored with Lori Copeland ====
- The Island of Heavenly Daze, Harper Collins, 2000.
- Grace in Autumn, Harper Collins, 2001.
- Warmth in Winter, Harper Collins, 2002.
- A Perfect Love, Harper Collins, 2002.
- Hearts at Home, Harper Collins, 2003.

==== Harbingers, with Bill Myers, Frank E. Peretti, Alton Gansky, and Jeff Gerke ====
- Sentinels, Harbingers #3, Amaris Media International, 2014
- Infiltration, Harbingers #7, Amaris Media International, 2015
- Hybrids, Harbingers #11, Amaris Media International, 2015
- Fairy, Harbingers #15, Amaris Media International, 2016
- Into the Blue, Harbingers #19, Amaris Media International, 2017

=== Collaborations--nonfiction ===
- Redeeming Love: the Bible Study, Francine Rivers and Angela Hunt, Multnomah, 2021.
- Don't Blink, Brandon and Brittany Buell and Angela Hunt, Tyndale, 2016.
- Street God, Dimas Salaberrios and Angela Hunt, Tyndale, 2015.
- Misconception, Paul and Shannon Morell and Angela Hunt, Howard, 2010.
- Why I Stayed, Gayle Haggard and Angela Hunt, Tyndale House, 2010.
- IdolEyes, Mandisa Hundley and Angela Hunt, Tyndale House, 2007.
- Don't Bet Against Me, Deanna Favre and Angela Hunt, Tyndale House, 2007
- Heavenly Crowns, with Heather Whitestone McCallum, Zondervan, 2004.
- Let God Surprise You, with Heather Whitestone McCallum, Zondervan, 2003.
- Flashpoints, with Steve Arterburn, Tyndale House, 2002.
- Listening With My Heart, with Heather Whitestone, Miss America 1995, Doubleday, 1997.
- The Rise of Babylon, with Charles Dyer, Tyndale, 1991.
