= Race (2007 film) =

- DVD cover
- Directed by: Robert Brousseau
- Written by: Rhonda Smiley
- Produced by: Robert Brousseau; Rhonda Smiley
- Starring: James Hereth; Kevin Lewis; Russel Perryman; Jane Roberts; Terry Diab; Bill Mendieta; H.L. Cannon; J.J. Song; Benita Marti
- Edited by: James Hereth
- Music by: Eric Allaman
- Production company: Hyper Image
- Distributed by: Phase 4 Films
- Release date: June 3, 2007 (Winnipeg)
- Running time: 99 minutes
- Country: United States
- Language: English

Race is a 2007 American animated science fiction film produced by Hyper Image, a post production and animation studio located in Glendale, California. Written by Rhonda Smiley and directed by Robert Brousseau, it stars James Hereth, Kevin Lewis, Russel Perryman, Jane Roberts, Terry Diab, Bill Mendieta, H.L. Cannon, J.J. Song, and Benita Marti.

It was first completed and screened for audiences at numerous film festivals in 2007, including the Winnipeg International Film Festival in Canada, the da Vinci Film Festival in Oregon, Philadelphia's Big Bang Film Festival, Another Hole in the Head Film Festival in San Francisco, and Southern California's FAIFF International Film Festival.

Following a pay-per-view run for RHI Entertainment in early 2010, the film was released on DVD by Phase 4 Films in Canada on May 18 and in the United States on May 25, 2010. It hit the US TV movie channels with a premiere on the Showtime Networks on October 14, 2010.

The film is 99 minutes long and is rated PG-13 by the MPAA for some suggestive images and action violence.

== Plot ==
In the far future, the interplanetary Alliance staves off war by establishing the high energy Star Car 5000 racing circuit, allowing potential enemies to act out their aggressions on the racecourse. The drivers become revered celebrities, but ruthlessness rules and the stakes grow higher.

A victim of corporate betrayal, Team Earth manager Potter (Russel Perryman) still carries deep emotional scars from a catastrophic crash and has vowed to win again - without any sponsorship. His ragtag crew consists of the only three people he trusts; himself, hardheaded driver Trance Caldron (James Hereth) and mechanic Stash (Jane Roberts).

Meanwhile, Planet Tagmatia's charismatic leader, Lord Helter (Kevin Lewis), is secretly making preparations for a massive military strike against the peacekeeping Alliance leadership, using his planet's racing team as a convenient way to mask his plans.

That is, until Team Earth inadvertently stumbles upon the invasion preparations when they discover the Tagmatians smuggling Shocktrooper robots through the Jumpgates, the strategically vital shortcuts through space.

Without help or proof of the plot, Team Earth is hunted by the war mongering Tagmatians. Potter's dream of winning the Star Car 5000 is fading fast.

With a pair of adversarial energy beings (Terry Diab) and a dishonest Alliance Chancellor (H.L. Cannon) complicating the proceedings, the situation turns more treacherous.

Ultimately, the prestigious Star Car Championship becomes a speed backdrop for a deadly game of cat and mouse, with the fate of the galaxy hanging in the balance. Team Earth must push their car, their team, and themselves to the limit just to survive.

In a race between good and evil... Winning is everything.

== Cast ==
- James Hereth as Trance Caldron / Bradford / Commander Chad
- Kevin Lewis as Lord Helter
- Russel Perryman as Samuel Potter
- Jane Roberts as Stash
- Terry Diab as Sola / Drayka
- Bill Mendieta as Frikes / Gortak
- H.L. Cannon as Chancellor Nedon / Partak
- J.J. Song as Chenti
- Benita Marti as T.E.S. Computer

== Production ==
Back in early 2000, Hyper Image had just completed animation work on Roughnecks: Starship Troopers Chronicles for Sony, when they decided to tackle their own in-house feature.

When initial investors dropped out near the end of pre-production, the company decided to keep moving forward, self-financing the project and devoting whatever time and resources they could while continuing to function as a full-time post production house for outside clients.

According to director, Robert Brousseau, "We pared our staff down to about 4-5 full time employees and continued to work on the movie as a side project. I would say that 85% of the animation on the film was done by two individuals."

As a result, a production that was intended to last a couple of years stretched out to more than six. With limited funding and an expanding schedule, the ability to incorporate new technology as it became available proved impossible. "The length of time to update the assets would have taken 2 years to complete," said Brousseau. "We couldn’t chase technology we had to push what we had. That was our goal.

The film was completed and mastered in late 2006 and hit the festival circuit the following year. Unfortunately, the struggle continued as Hyper Image battled to find "Race" a spot in the marketplace. Ultimately, it would take another three years for "Race" to finally find direct-to-video distribution through Phase 4 Films.

“Typically, when looking to acquire a film, we want something that’s gonna work… [We] work with the sales team to identify what kind of genres work for us,” said Jennifer Ansley, vice president of marketing for Phase 4 Films.

Promotion and marketing for the independent movie was largely done online, with write-ups and reviews on websites like Ain't It Cool News, CraveOnline, and Forever Geek.
