= Who Is Simon Miller? =

2011 television film directed by Paolo Barzman

- Written by: Sheryl J. Anderson; Jeff Davenport
- Story by: Steven Manuel
- Directed by: Paolo Barzman
- Starring: Robyn Lively; Loren Dean; Skyler Day; Drew Koles; Christine Baranski
- Music by: Ned Bouhalassa
- Country of origin: United States
- Original language: English

Production
- Executive producers: Pasquale F. Gentile; Jeff Grant; Michael Prupas; Joel S. Rice; Ben Simon; Brian Wells
- Producer: Irene Litinsky
- Cinematography: Pierre Jodoin
- Editor: Annie Ilkow
- Running time: 85 minutes
- Production companies: Muse Entertainment Enterprises; Procter & Gamble Productions

Original release
- Network: NBC
- Release: August 6, 2011

Who Is Simon Miller? is a 2011 American spy family television film directed by Paolo Barzman and starring Robyn Lively, Loren Dean, Skyler Day, Drew Koles, and Christine Baranski. It is the seventh film in the series Family Movie Night.

== Plot ==
Simon Miller (Loren Dean) outwardly appears to be a geologist who must frequently take business trips, which has strained the relationship with his family, including his wife Meredith (Robyn Lively) and teenage children Sarah (Skyler Day) and Kevin (Drew Koles). When Simon suddenly does not return from his latest trip, they go looking for him. They receive assistance from Amanda (Christine Baranski), another covert operative who initially seems to be a friend, but appears to have her own motives.

== Production ==
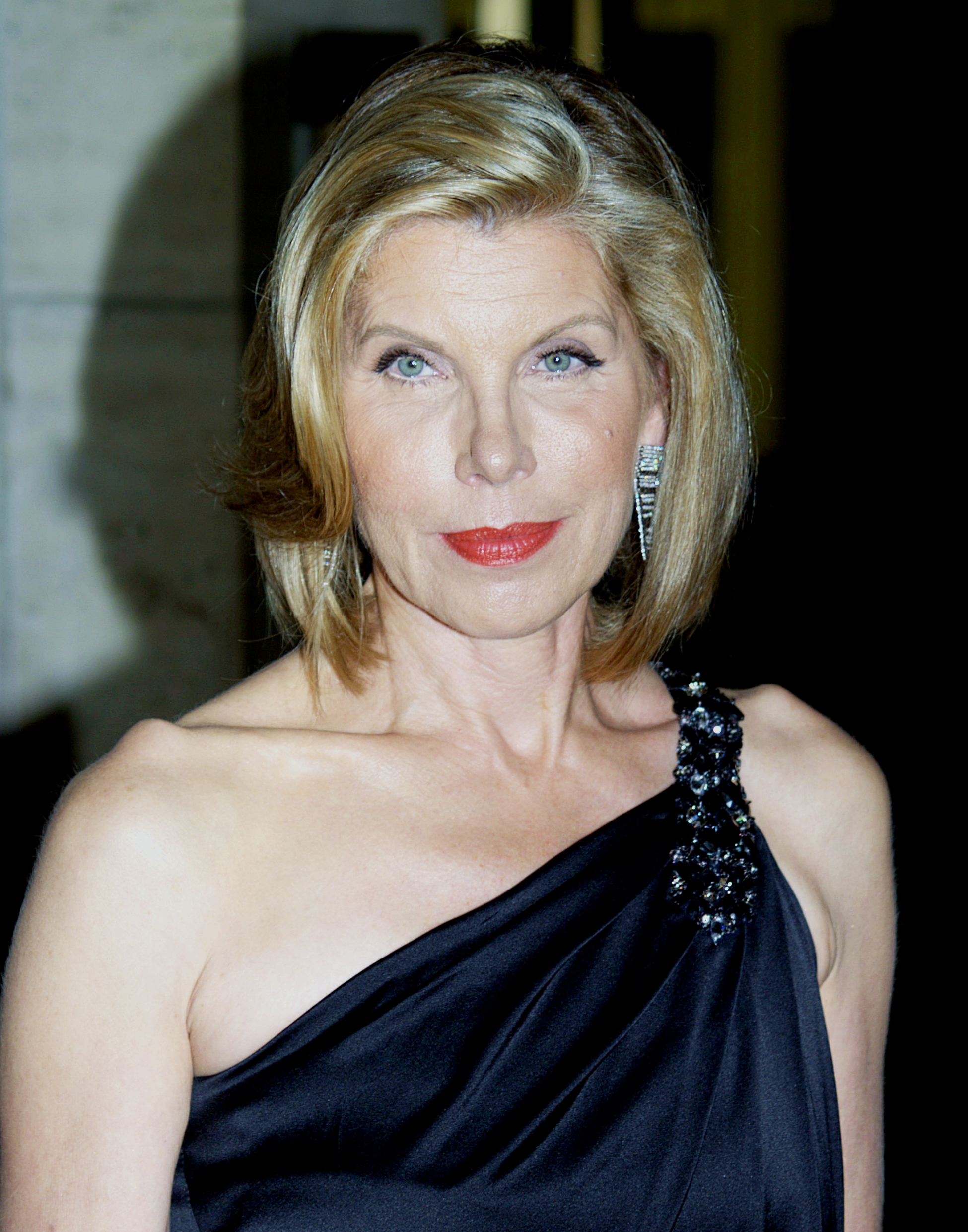
Christine Baranski portrayed the covert operative Amanda in Who Is Simon Miller?, the first time she played a spy.

Originally titled Passport, Who Is Simon Miller? was filmed in Montreal starting in March 2010. It was directed by Paolo Barzman and written by Sheryl J. Anderson, marking her film screenwriting debut. One of the producers, Joel Rice, previously worked with Baranski on the Lifetime television movie Recipe for a Perfect Christmas. The film is part of the NBC network's "Family Movie Night", which is sponsored by Walmart and Procter & Gamble. Walmart spokesman Ben Simon said he hopes the film would lead to "thousands of hours of more family programming in the marketplace on an annual basis".

Baranski canceled a birthday trip she had planned in Paris to accept the role, the shooting for which began immediately after the filming of her role as Diane Lockhart on the CBS drama series The Good Wife. It marked the first time Baranski has portrayed a spy, and she did some reading about life in the Central Intelligence Agency to prepare, but otherwise had little time for research. Robyn Lively particularly complimented the family dynamic among the characters in the script, as well as a scene in which Simon apologizes to Meredith at a train station for the impact his career has had on the family. Lively said she became genuinely emotional while filming the scene.

== Reception ==
The Christian Post writer Josephine Vivaldo said films on Family Movie Night on NBC/FOX often include values and moral lessons, but that Who Is Simon Miller? "proved that they can also make it about car chasings, multiple identities, cryptography, secret agents and action-packed entertainment minus the severe violence". The film was recommended by "Moms 4 Family TV", a group of mothers who promote family-oriented and child-friendly television programming.
