= The Jensen Project =

- The Jensen Project DVD cover
- Genre: Action; Adventure; Family; Fantasy; Sci-Fi
- Created by: Walmart; Procter & Gamble
- Written by: Monica Macer
- Story by: Jeff Davenport; Steve Manuel
- Directed by: Douglas Barr
- Starring: Kellie Martin; Brady Smith; LeVar Burton; Justin Kelly; Alyssa Diaz; Patricia Richardson; David Andrews
- Theme music composer: Randy Jackson; Eric Allaman
- Countries of origin: Canada; United States
- Original language: English

Production
- Executive producers: Jeff Grant; Joel S. Rice; Brian Wells
- Producer: Irene Litinsky
- Production location: Toronto
- Cinematography: Pierre Jodoin
- Editor: Simon Webb
- Running time: 120 minutes
- Production companies: Muse Entertainment Enterprises; Procter & Gamble Productions

Original release
- Network: NBC
- Release: July 16, 2010

Related
- Secrets of the Mountain; A Walk in My Shoes

The Jensen Project is the second in the Family Movie Night TV movies series produced by Procter & Gamble and Walmart aimed at families.

The movie featured embedded marketing for the Kinect, a motion sensor add-on to the Xbox 360, several months before the product's launch. The movie featured the Moller Skycar, a vertical take-off and landing aircraft or "flying car".

== Plot ==
After a 16-year absence from the Jensen Project, a secret community of scientists conducting advanced underground experiments to resolve the world's problems, Matt (Brady Smith) and Claire Thompson (Kellie Martin) are asked to come back and stop Edwin Jensen (David Andrews) from using nanobots to take over other people. To create these nanobots, Edwin needs a molecular assembler, which he steals. With the help of Kendrick James (LeVar Burton), Ginny (Mylène Dinh-Robic) and Ingrid Jensen (Patricia Richardson), Matt and Claire use chemical traces of gold and silicon to track down the location of the assembler. They are misled, but Brody (Justin Kelly), and his new friend from the Project, Samantha (Alyssa Diaz), manage to trace Edwin through a voice tracker and retrieve the molecular assembler. Brody is caught and implanted with nanobots. Edwin threatens to kill Brody with the nanobots if the molecular assembler is not returned to him. The Project members mount a successful mission to destroy Edwin's laboratory and capture him before he can execute his plan to harm others with the nanobots.

== Cast ==
- Kellie Martin as Claire Thompson
- Brady Smith as Matt Thompson
- LeVar Burton as Kendrick
- Justin Kelly as Brody Thompson
- Alyssa Diaz as Samantha "Sam" Cortez
- Patricia Richardson as Ingrid Jensen
- David Andrews as Edwin Jensen

== Production ==
Procter & Gamble and Walmart started out with plans for three movies in the Family Movie Night. By early 2010, NBC was brought in as the broadcaster. The telefilm was filmed in Toronto by Muse Entertainment Enterprises and Procter & Gamble Productions starting in late February 2010.

== Reception ==
Ratings for the July 16, 2010 airing on NBC were disappointing with fewer than 4 million viewers while being one of two new programs that night, and came in third for the night. The film was widely panned by critics. Los Angeles Times reviewer called the movie "super-bad", criticizing the dialog and the embedded marketing of Procter & Gamble and Walmart products, but "it's almost worth watching for its 'Mystery Science Theater 3000' potential." Brian Lowry of Variety stated that the "Shoddy looking and saddled with a story that makes most Disney Channel fare look like Masterpiece Theater, this inane adventure is most notable for some of the clunkiest product-placement ever." At the IMDB, as of September 19, 2018, the movie received a weighted average vote of 4.9 out of 10 with 380 user voting.

== See also ==
- Product placement
- Secrets of the Mountain
