= David Andrews (actor) =

American actor (born 1952)

- Born: Stanley David Andrews; November 2, 1952 (age 73); Baton Rouge, Louisiana, U.S.
- Education: Louisiana State University (BA); Duke University (attended); Stanford University (JD)
- Occupation: Actor
- Years active: 1982–present
- Spouse: Shannon Williams Andrews
- Children: 1

Stanley David Andrews (born November 2, 1952) is an American character actor who is particularly known for his role as Lieutenant General Robert Brewster in Terminator 3: Rise of the Machines.

== Early life ==
Andrews was born on November 2, 1952, in Baton Rouge, Louisiana. He attended Louisiana State University as an undergraduate and spent a year at the Duke University School of Law and two at Stanford Law School, from which he graduated in the late 1970s.

== Career ==
His first major role was in the 1984 horror A Nightmare on Elm Street. For the rest of the 80s Andrews did not have any major hits, mainly focusing on a TV career including the BBC detective series Pulaski in 1987. He was the lead in Cherry 2000, which appeared on videocassette and not in theaters. In 1990 he starred in Stephen King's Graveyard Shift and in 1994 he was James Earp in Kevin Costner's Wyatt Earp. His career was boosted by starring in the TV series Mann & Machine. In 1995 he played astronaut Pete Conrad, in the space drama Apollo 13. In the late 90s Andrews concentrated on more television projects and starred in TV films such as Our Son, the Matchmaker, Fifteen and Pregnant, which also starred Kirsten Dunst, and the hit TV film Switched at Birth. In 1998 he played another astronaut, Frank Borman, in the HBO miniseries From the Earth to the Moon. In the 2001 Band of Brothers miniseries, he had a brief role as Major General Elbridge Chapman, the division commander in 1945, of the 13th Airborne Division.

Andrews appeared in Fight Club. In 2000, Andrews starred in Navigating the Heart before moving on to the Silence of the Lambs sequel Hannibal, starring Anthony Hopkins. He also appeared in A Walk to Remember (2002), Two Soldiers (2003), The Chester Story and Terminator 3: Rise of the Machines. He also replaced John M. Jackson in the final season of JAG, playing Judge Advocate General Major General Gordon 'Biff' Cresswell. He was Edwin Jensen in the TV Movie The Jensen Project, and guest starred in the Criminal Minds season 4 episode "Paradise".

Andrews played the role of Scooter Libby in the 2010 film, Fair Game, based on the Valerie Plame affair. In 2012 he portrayed Sheriff Tillman Napier on season 3 of the FX series Justified. He made a final appearance in one episode of season 4.

== Filmography ==
=== Film ===
David Andrews film credits
Year	Title	Role	Notes
1984	A Nightmare on Elm Street	Foreman	
1984	Kerouac, the Movie	Dean Moriarty	Documentary
1988	Cherry 2000	Sam Treadwell	
1990	Graveyard Shift	John Hall	
1993	The Pitch	Short film	
1994	Wyatt Earp	James Earp	
1995	Apollo 13	Pete Conrad	
1995	The Whiskey Heir	Nathan	Short film
1997	Bad Day on the Block	Reese Braverton	
1999	Fight Club	Thomas	
2001	Hannibal	FBI Agent Pearsall	
2002	A Walk to Remember	Mr. Kelly	
2002	Town Diary	Brian McCauley	
2003	A Touch of Fate	James Kline	
2003	Terminator 3: Rise of the Machines	General Robert Brewster	
2003	Two Soldiers	Lieutenant Hogenbeck	Short film
2004	The Last Summer	Richard Finney	
2005	The Rain Makers	Jerry	
2005	Stealth	Ray	
2006	Snapshot	Nathan	Short film
2006	Pulse	Edward Watson	Short film
2008	The Horror Theater	Edward Watson	
2009	Wine Tasting	Jon	Short film
2010	Dear John	Mr. Curtis	
2010	Fair Game	Scooter Libby	
2010	The Conspirator	Father Walter	
2012	Arthur Newman	Chuck Willoughby	
2013	World War Z	Naval commander	
2013	Don't Know Yet	Swag	
2014	Jessabelle	Leon Laurent	

=== Television ===
David Andrews television credits
Year	Title	Role	Notes					
1984	The Burning Bed	Wimpy Hughes	TV movie					
1985	Midas Valley		TV movie					
1985	Wild Horses	Dean Ellis	TV movie					
1988	The Equalizer	Del Larkin	Episode: "A Dance on the Dark Side"					
1989	The Equalizer	Dale Stevens	Episode: "Race Traitors"					
1989	Miami Vice	Jack Crockett	Episode "Jack of All Trades"					
1990	A Son's Promise	Wayne O'Kelley	TV movie					
1991	Living a Lie	Lonnie	TV movie					
1994	Deconstructing Sarah	Paul	TV movie					
1995	Shame II: The Secret		TV movie					
1996	Sophie & the Moonhanger		TV movie					
1996	Our Son, the Matchmaker	Steve Carson	TV movie					
1998	Just Shoot Me	Jay Crew	Episode “How The Finch Stole Christmas”					
1998	Fifteen and Pregnant	Cal Spangler	TV movie					
1998	The Rat Pack	G-Man #3	TV movie					
1998	The Color of Courage	Phillip Renfrew	TV movie					
1998	From the Earth to the Moon	Frank Borman	TV miniseries					
1999	Switched at Birth	James Barlow	TV movie					
2000	Touched by an Angel	Jim Sullivan	1 episode					
2000	Navigating the Heart	William Sanders	TV movie					
2001	Band of Brothers	Gen. Elbridge G. Chapman	TV miniseries					
2002	Crime Scene Investigation	Officer Fromansky	2 episodes					
2003	The Practice	Judge Wilbur Stucky	3 episodes					
2004	Star Trek: Enterprise	Lorian	Episode: "E²" (S3.E21)					
2004	The Dead Will Tell	John Hytner	TV movie					
2005	JAG	Gordon Cresswell	TV series					
2005	Law & Order: Criminal Intent	Lloyd Wilkes	Episode: "False-Hearted Judges" (S4.E23)					
2006	Stargate SG-1	Se’tak	1 episode (S10.E7)					
2007	The Closer	Donald Baxter, Jr.	Episode: "The Round File" (S3.E5)					
2008	Brothers & Sisters	George Lafferty	2 episodes: "Bakersfield", "Do you believe in Magic?"					
2009	Ghost Whisperer	Dr. Albert Glassman	Episode: "Do Over"					
2010	The Jensen Project		TV movie	justified TV Series 2012-2013 Sheriff Tillman Napier 7 episodes -	2011	Covert Affairs	Steve Barr	2 episodes
2015	Cocked	Clyde	TV movie					
2019–2026	The Boys	Steven Calhoun	6 episodes					
2019	For All Mankind	Admiral Scott Uken	1 episode (S1.E2)					
2019	Watchmen	Dep. Director Farragut	Episode: "She Was Killed by Space Junk"					
2019–2021	Queen of the South	Judge Cecil Lafayette	16 episodes					
2022	The Black Hamptons	Peter Sing	TV miniseries					
