= Every Young Man's Battle =

2004 Christian book by Stephen Arterburn, Fred Stoeker and Mike Yorkey

- Cover
- Author: Stephen Arterburn, Fred Stoeker
- Subject: Self-help, religion
- Publisher: WaterBrook
- Publication date: 2004-20-01
- ISBN: 978-1-578-56970-0
- OCLC: 48428995
- Dewey Decimal: 241.66 21
- LC Class: BV4541.3 .A78 2001

Every Young Man's Battle is a best-selling Christian book written by Stephen Arterburn, Fred Stoeker and Mike Yorkey that also covers opposition to premarital sex and pornography for teenage boys. The book is part of a media franchise of books like Every Young Woman's Battle that frequently are on the top 100 Christian book sales lists.

It was published by WaterBrook Press, a division of Random House.

In September 2006, Fred Stoeker published a spin-off to Every Young Man's Battle entitled Tactics.
