= Our Son, the Matchmaker =

1996 made-for-television family film

- Genre: Drama
- Written by: Robert L. Freedman; Richard Leder
- Directed by: Lorraine Senna
- Starring: Ann Jillian; David Andrews; Ellen Burstyn
- Music by: Stewart Levin
- Country of origin: United States
- Original language: English

Production
- Executive producers: Les Alexander; Don Enright
- Producers: Susan Jeter; Mark Kitts
- Cinematography: Karl Herrmann
- Editor: Joanne D'Antonio
- Production companies: Alexander/Enright & Associates; Hallmark Entertainment

Original release
- Network: CBS
- Release: May 8, 1996

Our Son, the Matchmaker is a 1996 American made-for-television drama film directed by Lorraine Senna, starring Ann Jillian and David Andrews as a couple who are separated as teenagers when their illegitimate child is born and sent for adoption, and are reunited years later when their grown-up son seeks them out. The movie is based on a true story.

== Plot ==
Julie Longwell, the owner of a hair salon in the town of Dobbs Mill, is paid a visit by a social worker who tells her that her son is looking for her. Julie is shocked by the news and in a series of flashbacks recalls the circumstances of her son being sent for adoption.

As a teenager, Julie was going steady with Steve Carson, though the relationship had the disapproval of Julie's mother, Iva Mae. When Julie became pregnant, Iva Mae sent Julie to a special home for unwed mothers where she gave birth to a boy who was immediately sent away for adoption. When Julie returned home, she discovered that while she was gone, Steve had a breakdown, married another girl and enlisted in the Air Force. Although she was heartbroken over the loss of two of her loves, Julie eventually moved on with her life, but did not forget either one of them.

In the present, Julie decides to meet with her son, despite her current family's protestations that the meeting would be too painful. When she does meet her son Scott, who is a minister, they bond immediately.

Scott is also looking for his father, Steve, and Julie agrees to help him. She tracks Steve down to his office, and he ends up returning to Dobbs Mill to meet Julie in person. The pair spend the day exploring the town as they walk down memory lane together, and they discover that despite being apart for many years, they still have feelings for each other. Julie's grown-up daughter from a previous marriage disapproves this development, especially since Julie has recently become engaged to another man. Steve senses the disapproval and decides to leave Julie to her new life. Julie is disappointed with Steve's choice, but knows that she cannot marry her fiancé when she still has feelings for another man, so she calls off the engagement.

Scott, whose wife is pregnant, has a series of separate meetings with Julie and Steve, and comes to realize that they still have feelings for each other. Scott arranges a bowling event and invites both Julie and Steve without either knowing that the other will be there. Julie and Steve are forced to confront each other and accept that they are still in love with each other. On the day that Scott's wife gives birth to Julie and Steve's grandson, Steve proposes to Julie and she accepts.

Julie and Steve are married in a church with their own son as the minister. Julie's grown-up daughter has by now given their union a blessing, as has Julie's mother, albeit reluctantly.

== Cast ==
- Ann Jillian as Julie Longwell
- David Andrews as Steve Carson
- Ellen Burstyn as Iva Mae Longwell
- Deirdre O'Connell as Winona
- Drew Ebersole as Scott Adams
- Marisa Coughlan as Young Julie Longwell
- Ron Melendez as Young Steve Carson
- Linda Larkin as Melanie Miller
- Ashley Jones as Young Winona
- Mike Pniewski as Kevin Harris
- Jennifer Sky as Judy Adams
- Andy Stahl as Walter Longwell
- Michael Hartson as Donald Miller
- Karen Fraction as Claudia Wade
- Rick Galloway as Jerry
- Kelly Collins Lintz as Mary Beth
- John Hostetter as John Adams
