= The Note (film) =

2007 American television film

- Based on: The Note by Angela Hunt
- Written by: Paul W. Cooper
- Directed by: Douglas Barr
- Starring: Genie Francis; Ted McGinley
- Theme music composer: Eric Allaman
- Countries of origin: United States; Canada
- Original language: English

Production
- Executive producers: William Spencer Reilly; Joel S. Rice; Karen M. Waldron; Cindy Bond
- Producer: Steve Solomos
- Cinematography: Derick V. Underschultz
- Editor: Cindy Parisotto
- Running time: 88 minutes
- Production company: Faith & Values Media

Original release
- Network: Hallmark Channel
- Release: December 8, 2007

Related
- Taking a Chance on Love

The Note is a 2007 American-Canadian made-for-television drama film directed by Douglas Barr and starring Genie Francis and Ted McGinley. The film aired on Hallmark Channel on December 8, 2007. It is based on the novel of the same name by Angela Hunt and was filmed on location in Hamilton, Ontario.

== Plot summary ==
Newspaper columnist Peyton MacGruder (Genie Francis) finds a note addressed simply to 'T', washed up on shore. It appears to be from the victim of a recent plane crash, and carries a message of hope and forgiveness from a father to his child. MacGruder's readership is down on her column (called "Heart Healer"), and the paper is going to dump it unless she starts to write from the heart. Inspired, MacGruder decides to find the intended recipient of the note, all the while logging her journey through her article. As the mystery unfolds, the note affects each person she contacts significantly.

== Cast ==
- Genie Francis as Peyton MacGruder
- Ted McGinley as Kingston "King" Danville
- Rick Roberts as Truman Harris
- Genelle Williams as Mandi
- Maria Ricossa as Nora
- Katie Boland as Christine
- Jim Codrington as Reverend Tim Lavery
- Heather Hanson as Taylor Quist
- Gord Rand as Tanner Walton

== Differences from the novel ==
- The book does not take place in the winter time, therefore it is not surrounded by the Christmas holiday.
- The book's events take place in Tampa Bay, Florida. In the film, the events transpire in Middleborough, North Carolina.
- In the film, Katie Boland's character is named Christine. In the book, she's named Lila.

== Promotion ==
To support the premiere of the film, Hallmark Channel launched a website on October 22, 2007 called www.WhatWouldYouWrite.com, where viewers could submit their own personalized notes to family and friends and answer the question 'who would you reach out to if you only had a minute?' The website has since been disconnected.

== Reception ==
The Note became Hallmark Channel's highest-rated film of 2007 and third highest all-time rating.

DVD Verdict called it "syrupy", but that fans of other Hallmark Channel-type fare will "find a treasure trove of positivity and middle-aged sexual tension".

== Sequel ==
Due to the success of the movie for Hallmark Channel, a sequel was made, entitled Taking a Chance on Love, which was written by Douglas Barr. The Note author Angela Hunt did a novelization of Barr's script. The original cast returned to reprise their roles. The film's premiere scored a 2.9 household rating with 2.5 million homes, over 3.3 million total viewers and 4.2 million unduplicated viewers for Hallmark Channel. This ranked the movie as the highest-rated ad-supported cable movie of the week and the highest-rated Prime Time telecast of the day. It also boosted Hallmark Channel to rank #1 in Prime Time for the day on Saturday. The film helped rank Hallmark Channel #7 in Prime Time for the week with a 1.1 household rating, 983,000 homes and over 1.3 million total viewers.

Another sequel, Notes from the Heart Healer, was broadcast on May 12, 2012.
