= Timothy L. Raynor =

American actor

Timothy L. Raynor (born March 15, 1950) is an American actor, stuntman, and stunt choreographer who is best known for his work on Jimmy Huston's 1981 slasher film Final Exam, where he portrayed "The Lanier College Killer" as well as acting as a fight choreographer. Timothy has also appeared on television shows such as Life, My Name Is Earl, Do Not Disturb, and Terminator: The Sarah Connor Chronicles.

== Personal life ==
Timothy is married to actress Chelsea Bond. They have been together since 2004.
