= Eric Allaman =

American composer

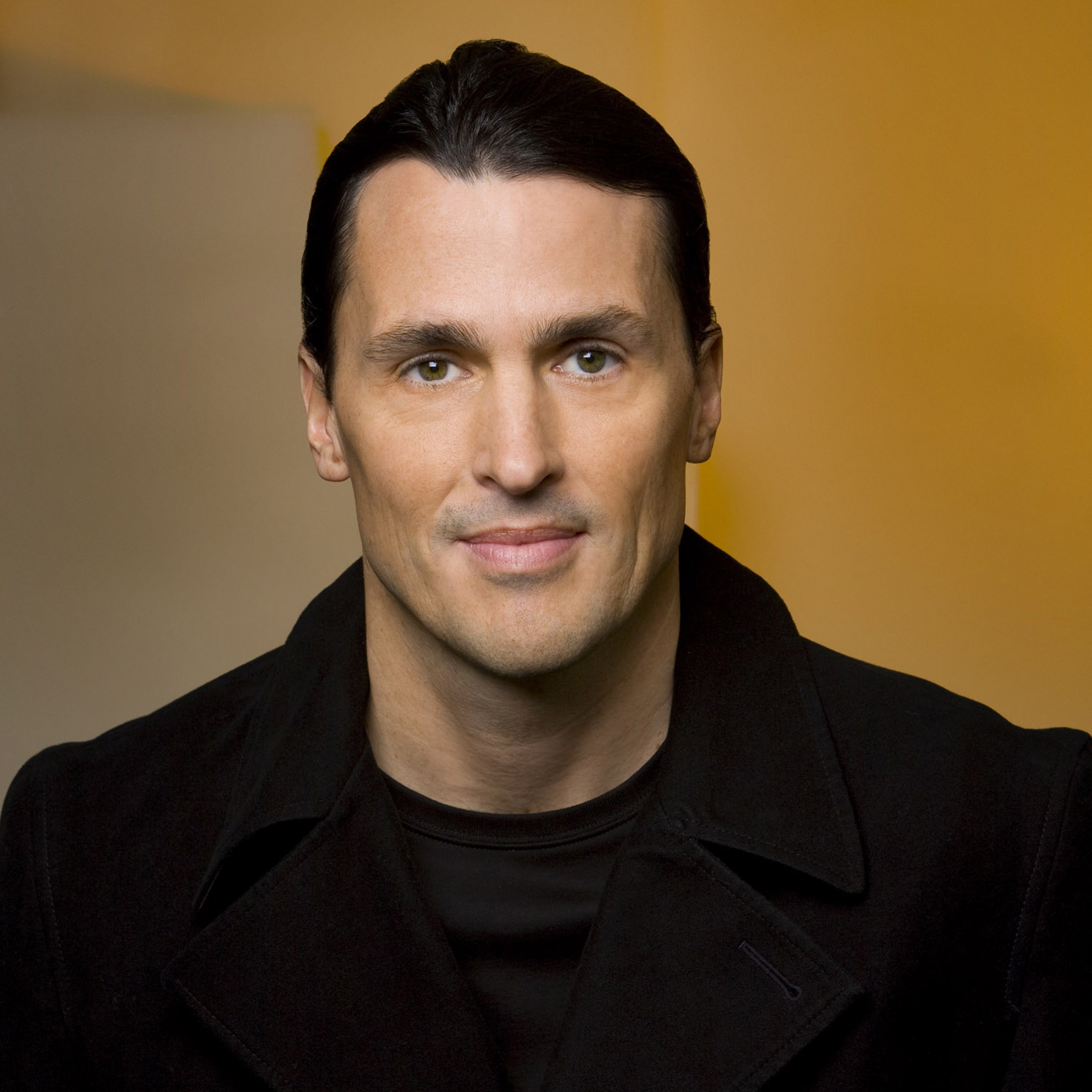

Background information
- Born: Springfield, Missouri
- Genres: Film score, musical theatre, ballet
- Occupation: Composer
- Instrument: Piano
- Years active: 1985–present
- Website: https://www.ericallaman.com

Eric Allaman is an American composer who has worked in film, television, theater and ballet. His career began when he co-composed the score to Ridley Scott's Legend with the German electronic group Tangerine Dream. That opportunity led to Eric re-scoring the silent classic, Battleship Potemkin which was re-released in Europe and featured at the Berlin Film Festival.

== Life and career ==
Born in Springfield, Missouri, Allaman's family moved around the Midwest and eventually settled in Dana Point, California. Allaman began studying the piano at age 7, the guitar at age 16, and continued his studies at UCLA with an emphasis on music and theater.

Shortly after graduating, Allaman moved to Paris, France and ultimately West Berlin, Germany to further his musical career. Allaman hooked up with Reinhard Scheuregger and the two became Berlin Game. The duo scored four films, Legend, Battleship Potemkin, Down Twisted, Angel III: The Final Chapter, and released one album, Berlin Game. After the success of Legend and Battleship Potemkin, Berlin Game (Allaman & Scheuregger) returned to Los Angeles to field film scoring offers. After the WGA strike in 1988, Allaman and Scheuregger separated ways and Allaman began working under his own name. He has scored 43 movies and over 600 episodes of television shows and is best known for his scores to Legend, Battleship Potemkin, Latter Days, Witless Protection, Mike Hammer Private Eye, Extreme Makeover: Home Edition and Dante's Cove. Allaman won a BMI television award for his work with Extreme Makeover: Home Edition in 2006.

Allaman has written four musicals, including Zeitelmoos - Im Bann Anderer Mächte with Hartmut H. Forche (2022), Wake Up with Bob Garrett (2020), Battleship Potemkin with Jeffrey Couchman (1991), and Voices from the Cellar with Robert White (1989). Allaman has written three ballets with Kim Maselli (Artistic Director of the Pacific Festival Ballet), Camelot (2019), Noah's Ark (2010), and The Sea Princess (2007). He has also written the music to several plays, including The Geography of Luck, Dragon Lady, Stendhal, and Relay. Allaman has released two collections of piano solos. What We Whispered is a selection of pieces composed during the COVID-19 pandemic and was released in 2022. His first solo piano album, Berlin Diary, was released in 2010 and plays as a memoir of his life in West Berlin.

Eric was a professor for Pepperdine University, teaching Scoring Visual Media from 2014-2018.

== Personal life ==
Allaman has two sons, Von Essex and Tristian Leif from his first marriage that ended in 2005. He lives with his domestic partner, celebrity chef, Elizabeth Clune. He is an active surfer and skier and currently lives in The Sea Ranch, California.

== Professional credits ==
=== Television ===
Year	Title	Notes
2015	Dangerous Lessons	TV movie
2014	Naughty & Nice	TV movie
2014	Runaway	TV movie
2014	Fatal Acquittal	TV movie
2014	Boss Hog	TV series
2013	My Santa	TV movie
2013–2015	The Insider	TV series - 19 episodes
2012–2015	Duck Dynasty	TV series - 20 episodes
2012–2015	Pets.TV	TV series - 8 episodes
2011	Game Time: Tackling the Past	TV movie
2011–2013	Chemistry	TV series - 13 episodes
2010–2015	Entertainment Tonight	TV series - 33 episodes
2010	The Jensen Project	TV movie
2010	Secrets of the Mountain	TV movie
2009	Taking a Chance on Love	TV movie
2009	Heat Wave	TV movie
2008	Fall of Hyperion	TV movie
2008	Puppy Plays the Classics	TV series
2007	The Note	TV movie
2005–2007	Dante's Cove	TV series - 13 episodes
2005	Extreme Makeover: Home Edition: How'd They Do That?	TV series - 5 episodes
2005	Confessions of an American Bride	TV movie
2004–2008	Extreme Makeover: Home Edition	TV series - 123 episodes
2004	Hollywood Walks	TV series documentary
2004	TV's Greatest Sidekicks	TV special
2003	Beautiful Girl	TV movie
2003	This Time Around	TV movie
2003	The Three Stooges 75th Anniversary Special	TV documentary
2003	Killer Flood	TV movie (+Orchestrations)
2002–2003	Liberty's Kids	TV series - 40 episodes
2001–2003	Super Duper Sumos	TV series - 26 episodes
2001	An Evening with Rosanne Seaborn	TV movie
2000	One Kill	TV movie (+Orchestrations)
1999–2001	Sherlock Holmes in the 22nd Century	TV series - 26 episodes
1999	Half a Dozen Babies	TV movie
1998	Breakfast with Einstein	TV movie
1997–1998	Mike Hammer, Private Eye	TV series - 26 episodes
1995–1997	Mutant League	TV series - 40 episodes
1995–1996	The Adventures of Hyperman	TV series - 13 episodes (Main Theme)
1994–1997	High Tide	TV series - 50 episodes
1994–1995	Boogies Diner	TV series - 40 episodes
1993	Madison	TV series - 13 episodes
1992–1994	African Skies	TV series - 52 episodes
1992	Incident at Victoria Falls	TV movie
1991–1992	Chip and Pepper's Cartoon Madness	TV series
1991–1992	Stunt Dawgs	TV series - 26 episodes
1991	ProStars	TV series - 13 episodes
1990	Jungle Book Reunion	TV movie
1989	The Super Mario Bros. Super Show!	TV series
1987	Trying Times	TV series

=== Film ===
Year	Title	Notes
2016	JL Ranch	
2015	Stolen from Suburbia	
2015	Lost After Dark	
2015	Exeter	
2013	The Cuban Dream	Documentary
2008	Witless Protection	
2007	Race	
2004	Raspberry Heaven	
2003	Latter Days	
2003	Mike Hammer: Song Bird	Video
2001	Elvira's Haunted Hills	
2000	Luminarias	
1999	Our Friend, Martin	Video
1997	True Heart	
1997	Midnight Blue	
1994	Hits!	
1994	Nursery Raps Starring Mama Goose	Video Short
1992	Miracle Beach	
1990	Angel III: The Final Chapter	
1987	Down Twisted	(As Berlin Game)
1986	Battleship Potemkin	
1985	Legend (1985 film)	

=== Musical Theatre, theatre and dance ===
Year	Title	Notes
2022	Zeitelmoos - Im Bann Anderer Mächte	German Musical
2021	Wake Up - aka Keep Hope Alive	Musical Theatre
2019	Camelot	Dance
2015	Battleship Potemkin	Musical Theatre
2010	Noah's Ark	Dance
2007	Sea Princess	Ballet
1989	Voices from the Cellar	Musical Theatre
1989	The Geography of Luck	Theatre
1989	Dragon Lady	Theatre
1988	Stendhal	Theatre
1988	Relay	Theatre

=== Soundtracks ===
Year	Album
2022	What We Whispered
2021	DAS 7
2020	Berlin Game
2019	Camelot
2015	Exeter
2015	Lost After Dark
2015	True Heart
2015	Dystopia
2013	The Angel Trilogy
2010	Berlin Diary
2010	Noah's Ark
2007	Sea Princess
2007	Dante's Cove
2003	Latter Days
2002	Elvira's Haunted Hills
1997	True Heart (Spirit of the Nations)
1992	Miracle Beach
1992	Nursery Raps with Mama Goose
1987	Down Twisted
1986	Battleship Potemkin
1985	Legend
