= Brady Smith (actor) =

American actor (born 1971)

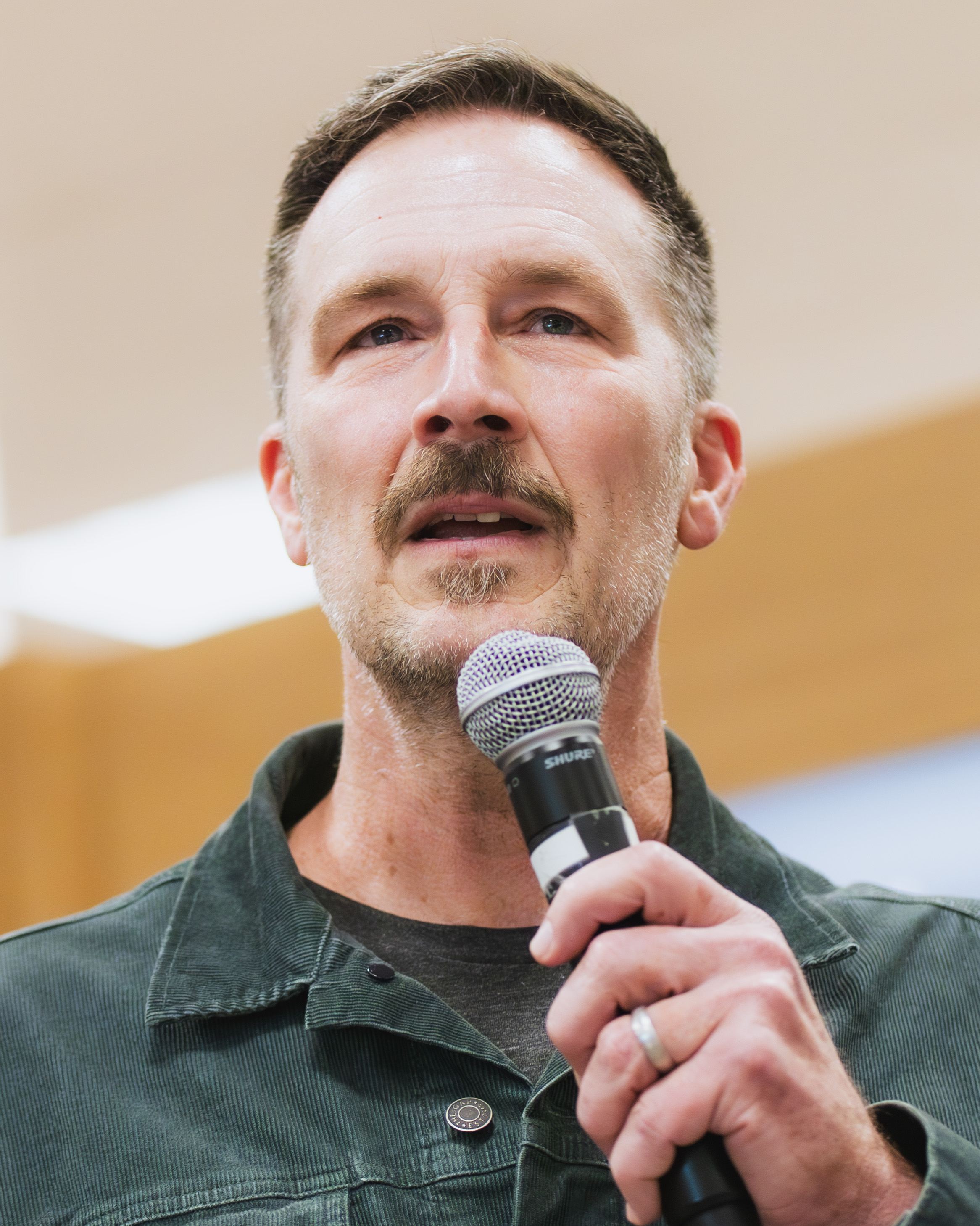
- Smith in 2026
- Born: December 29, 1971 (age 54); Houston, Texas, U.S.
- Occupation: Actor
- Years active: 2002–present
- Spouse: Tiffani Thiessen (m. 2005)
- Children: 2

Brady Smith (born December 29, 1971) is an American actor and author.

== Career ==
Smith has appeared on various television series, including ER (1994), JAG (1995), Charmed (1998), Judging Amy (1999), CSI: Miami (2002), The Comeback (2005), The Mentalist (2009), White Collar (2011), Criminal Minds (2014) and Alexa & Katie (2020) as Joe.

In 2010, Smith starred in the Hallmark Channel television movie Ice Dreams, and starred as Matt Thompson in the television movie The Jensen Project. In 2013 he was cast in the MTV television series Happyland. Smith played the father of the titular character in the 2016 television movie The Perfect Daughter.

== Personal life ==
Smith was born in Houston, Texas, and graduated from Stephen F. Austin State University in 1994. On July 9, 2005, he married actress Tiffani Thiessen. They have two children, a daughter and a son.

== Filmography ==
=== Film ===
Year	Title	Role	Notes
2002	Mother Ghost	Bartender	
2008	Pedro	Miami Doctor	
2011	Young Adult	Date Man	
2012	2 Days in New York	Security Guard Bob	
2015	Chatter	David Cole	
2016	Hickey	Bud Green	
2018	Truth or Dare	Roy Cameron	
2018	First Man	Butch Butchart	
2019	Into the Ashes	Brad Engels	
2021	High Holiday	Thayer	
TBA	45th Parallel	Van	

=== Television ===
Year	Title	Role	Notes
2002	JAG	CPO Jody Reese	Episode: "Code of Conduct"
2002	Presidio Med	Jerry	Episode: "Do No Harm"
2002	Andy Richter Controls the Universe	Cheating Boyfriend	Episode: "Twins"
2003	What I Like About You	Jack	Episode: "The Odd Couple"
2003	Charmed	SWAT Commander	Episode: "Little Monsters"
2004	Judging Amy	Bartender	Episode: "Roadhouse Blues"
2005	According to Bex	Rob	Episode: "Stuck in the Middle with You"
2005	CSI: Miami	Officer Insko	Episode: "Cop Killer"
2005	ER	Rod	Episode: "The Providers"
2005	The Comeback	Mike	2 episodes
2006	Twins	Danny Curry	Episode: "Sneaks and Geeks"
2006	In Justice	Jake Fisk	Episode: "Lovers"
2006	Just Legal	Owen / Security Guard	2 episodes
2006	The Closer	Detective McHale	2 episodes
2006	My Ex Life	Handsome Man	Television film
2007	NCIS	David Cross	Episode: "Friends & Lovers"
2007	Life	Man	Episode: "Pilot: Merit Badge"
2007	Side Order of Life	Ben Rose	Episode: "Aliens"
2008	Women's Murder Club	Tony Carter	Episode: "FBI Guy"
2008	Las Vegas	Chad	Episode: "Secrets, Lies and Lamaze"
2008	Black Widow	Lucas Miller	Television film
2008	Unhitched	Chad	Episode: "Conjoined Twins Pitch No-Hitter"
2008	Shark	Carl Lisco	Episode: "Wayne's World 3: Killer Shark"
2009	The Mentalist	Rob Wallace	Episode: "Paint It Red"
2009	Funny or Die Presents	Brady Smith	Episode: "Tiffani Thiessen Is Busy"
2009	Ice Dreams	Tim King	Television film
2010	Ghost Whisperer	Jack Carson	Episode: "Dead Air"
2010	Castle	Greg Murphy	Episode: "A Rose for Everafter"
2010	FutureStates	Jeff	Episode: "The Other Side"
2010	CSI: Crime Scene Investigation	Tom Layman	Episode: "Irradiator"
2010	The Jensen Project	Matt Thompson	Television film
2011	Bones	Greg Bovitz	Episode: "The Bikini in the Soup"
2011	Harry's Law	Chester Stewart	Episode: "The Fragile Beast"
2011	White Collar	Henry Van Horn	Episode: "As You Were"
2012	In Plain Sight	John Arnett / John Wilson	Episode: "The Merry Wives of Witsec"
2013	The Bridge	Mike Gates	Episode: "Pilot"
2013	Hostages	Vice President Jay Grant	2 episodes
2014	Parks and Recreation	Grant Larson	4 episodes
2014	Criminal Minds	Deputy Marty Bennett	2 episodes
2014	Happyland	James Chandler	6 episodes
2015	Meet My Valentine	Michael	Television film
2015	It's Always Sunny in Philadelphia	Tony	Episode: "The Gang Misses the Boat"
2015	CSI: Cyber	Bill Hookstraten	Episode: "Kidnapping 2.0"
2016	The Perfect Daughter	Martin Parish	Television film
2016	Love Always, Santa	Randy	Television film
2017	Hush Little Baby	James	Television film
2019–2020	Alexa & Katie	Joe Perry	6 episodes
2020	Psycho Yoga Instructor	Tom / husband	Television film
2021	The Rookie	Rico	Episode: "Lockdown"
2021	On the Verge	Jason	4 episodes
2022	Chicago Med	Lawrence Givens	Episode: "No Good Deed Goes Unpunished...in Chicago"
2023	CSI: Vegas	Jeremiah Beck	Episode: "The Promise"
