= Grant Jeffrey =

Canadian Bible teacher (1948–2012)

Grant Reid Jeffrey (October 5, 1948 – May 11, 2012) was a Canadian Bible teacher of Bible prophecy/eschatology and biblical archaeology and a proponent of dispensational evangelical Christianity. Jeffrey served as the chairman of Frontier Research Publications for more than 20 years. His books (variously published by WaterBrook Press, Bantam Books, HarperCollins, Zondervan, Word and Tyndale House) have sold more than 7 million copies and have been printed in 24 languages. Jeffrey was working on a new book called One Nation Under Attack (WaterBrook Press, January 2013), at the time of his death. He also appeared on television and radio shows, particularly on Christian programs and also had been invited to speak to groups around the globe.

== Education ==
In 1982, Jeffrey earned a Chartered Life Underwriter Certification from the University of Toronto's Extension Program. He later received his Master's Degree and Ph.D. in Biblical Studies from Louisiana Baptist University.

== Career ==
In 1999, Jeffrey's book, The Millennium Meltdown, reached #2 on the Publishers Weekly bestseller list for religious paperbacks. In 2000, his novel By Dawn's Early Light, which he co-wrote with Angela Hunt, won the Christy Award for futuristic Christian fiction.

In 2007, Trinity Broadcasting Network began broadcasting, Bible Prophecy Revealed, a 30-minute weekly program hosted by Jeffrey.

== Personal life ==
Grant Jeffrey was the son of Lyle Elmo Jeffrey and Florence Brown, and the brother of Canadian-American scholar of literature and religion David Lyle Jeffrey.

Grant Jeffrey died suddenly of a cardiac arrest on May 11, 2012, in Toronto, Canada.

== Works ==
- Apocalypse: The Coming Judgment of the Nations (WaterBrook Press, 1995), ISBN 0-553-56530-3
- Armageddon: Appointment with Destiny (WaterBrook Press, 1997), ISBN 0-921714-40-8
- By Dawn's Early Light, with Angela Elwell Hunt, ISBN 0-8499-1609-7
- Creation: Remarkable Evidence of God's Design (WaterBrook Press, 2003), ISBN 0-921714-78-5
- Final Warning (WaterBrook Press, 1995), ISBN 1-56507-479-3
- Final Warning: Economic Collapse and the Coming World Government, ISBN 0-921714-24-6
- Finding Financial Freedom (WaterBrook Press, 2005), ISBN 1-400071-05-4
- Flee The Darkness, with Angela Elwell Hunt, ISBN 0-8499-4063-X
- The Global Warming Deception (WaterBrook Press, 2011), ISBN 978-1-4000-7443-3
- The Handwriting of God (WaterBrook Press, 1997), ISBN 0-8499-4095-8
- The Handwriting of God: Sacred Mysteries of the Bible, ISBN 0-921714-38-6
- Heaven the Last Frontier (WaterBrook Press, 1996), ISBN 0-553-29286-2
- Heaven: The Mystery of Angels, ISBN 0-88368-972-3
- Jesus: The Great Debate (WaterBrook Press, 1999), ISBN 0-921714-56-4
- Journey Into Eternity: Search for Immortality (WaterBrook Press, 2000), ISBN 0-921714-60-2
- La Firma De Dios, ISBN 0-88368-488-8
- Messiah (WaterBrook Press, 1995), ISBN 0-921714-02-5
- Messiah: War in the Middle East and the Road to Armageddon, ISBN 0-553-29958-1
- Millennium Meltdown: Spiritual and Practical Strategies to Survive Y2K, ISBN 0-8423-4374-1
- Millennium Meltdown: The Year 2000 Computer Crisis, ISBN 0-921714-48-3
- The Mysterious Bible Codes, ISBN 0-8499-1325-X
- The New Temple and the Second Coming: The Prophecy That Points to Christ's Return in Your Generation (WaterBrook Press, 2007), ISBN 978-1-4000-7107-4
- The Next World War: What Prophecy Reveals About Extreme Islam and the West (WaterBrook Press, 2006), ISBN 978-1-4000-7106-7
- One Nation, Under Attack (WaterBrook Press, 2013), ISBN 978-0-307-73107-4
- Prince of Darkness: Antichrist and New World Order (WaterBrook Press, 1995), ISBN 0-553-56223-1
- The Scroll (WaterBrook Press, 2011), ISBN 978-0-307-72926-2
- Shadow Government (WaterBrook Press, 2009), ISBN 978-1-4000-7442-6
- The Signature of God (WaterBrook Press, 2002), ISBN 0-8499-4094-X
- The Signature of God: Astonishing Biblical Discoveries, ISBN 0-8423-6795-0
- The Spear of Tyranny (with Angela Hunt), ISBN 0-8499-4238-1
- Surveillance Society: The Rise of Antichrist (WaterBrook Press, 2000), ISBN 0-921714-62-9
- Triumphant Return: The Coming Kingdom of God (WaterBrook Press, 2001), ISBN 0-921714-64-5
- Unveiling Mysteries of the Bible (WaterBrook Press, 2002), ISBN 0-921714-72-6
- War on Terror: Unfolding Bible Prophecy (WaterBrook Press, 2002), ISBN 0-921714-66-1
