= Secrets of the Mountain =

- Written by: Dante Amodeo
- Screenplay by: Dante Amodeo
- Story by: Douglas Barr
- Directed by: Douglas Barr
- Starring: Paige Turco; Barry Bostwick; Shawn Christian; Adelaide Kane; Crawford Wilson; Kayla Carlson
- Composers: Eric Allaman; Randy Jackson
- Original language: en

Production
- Executive producers: Joel S. Rice; Brian Wells; Jeff Grant
- Producer: Irene Litinsky
- Production location: Canada
- Cinematography: Pierre Jodoin
- Running time: 2 hours
- Production companies: P&G Productions; Muse Entertainment
- Budget: $4.5 million

Original release
- Network: NBC
- Release: April 16, 2010

Secrets of the Mountain is the first TV film in Family Movie Night, a series of commercial made-for-TV movies produced by Procter & Gamble and Walmart aimed at families. Movies in the series feature embedded marketing of the producers' products. P&G Productions supposedly budgeted $4.5 million to make the TV film.

== Plot ==
A mountain cabin is inherited by a single mother and her three children from an eccentric uncle. The story's theme was that a family needs to pull together in tough times to move ahead.

== Cast ==
- Paige Turco as Dana James
- Barry Bostwick as Henry Beecham
- Shawn Christian as Tom Kent
- Adelaide Kane as Jade Ann James
- Crawford Wilson as Jake James
- Kayla Carlson as Maddie James
- Andreas Apergis as Nigel Fowler
- Frank Schorpion as Colin James
- Allison Graham as Brandi James

== History ==
Dante Amodeo of Jacksonville Beach was approached at a book signing for his young adult mystery novel Saban and the Ancient (2006) by a local TV producer for family friendly scripts. Amodeo developed a story he called "The Mountain". The story then tested so well that the Family Movie Night partners purchased the idea. Amodeo then wrote the screenplay before it was handed off to Douglas Barr to finalize the story. Barr was also hired to direct the film. P&G Productions supposedly budgeted $4.5 million to make the TV film. Production took place in Montreal with a 100-foot "mountain" built on a football field-size sound stage. By February 1, 2010, NBC had scheduled the telefilm for April 16, 2010 while also indicating that it was a backdoor pilot.

== See also ==
- The Jensen Project
- Product placement
