= Douglas Barr =

American actor, writer, and director

- Born: May 1, 1949 (age 77); Cedar Rapids, Iowa, U.S.
- Occupations: Actor; writer; director
- Years active: 1980–present

Douglas Barr (born May 1, 1949) is an American actor, writer, and director. He has starred in movies and on television.

== Early life ==
Barr was born in Cedar Rapids, Iowa.

== Career ==
His big role came in the ABC TV series The Fall Guy as Howie Munson from 1981 to 1986. Barr then made some guest appearances on series such as Fantasy Island, The Love Boat, Hotel, and Murder, She Wrote. His other well-known role was in the short-lived CBS TV series The Wizard as Alex Jagger from 1986 to 1987, and he later starred, as Colonel Bill Stillfield. as the romantic lead character, with (Jean Smart ) as Charlene Frazier, the Office Manager, from the hit, CBS series Designing Women from 1988 to 1991.

The first feature film in which he starred was the horror movie Deadly Blessing (1981). He also starred in The Unseen, another horror movie. His last film role was in the erotic film Temptation (1994). He went on to direct numerous TV movies.

In 1998, Barr started Hollywood and Vine Cellars, a small, high-end wine producer in Napa Valley.

== Personal life ==
In June 1984, Douglas Barr and Clare Ann Kirkconnell married.

== Filmography ==
=== Actor ===
Year	Title	Role	Notes
1980	Semi-Tough	Billy Clyde Puckett	Episode: "Barbara Jane Moves In"
1980	When the Whistle Blows	Buzz Dillard	Main cast (9 episodes)
1980	The Unseen	Tony Ross	Feature film
1980	Fantasy Island	Ned Pringle	Episode: "The Invisible Woman/The Snow Bird"
1981	Deadly Blessing	Jim Schmidt	Feature film
1981–86	The Fall Guy	Howie Munson	Main cast (112 episodes)
1982	The Love Boat	Dave Pursinger	Episodes: "The Experiment" (Part 1 & 2)
1983	Trauma Center	Howie Munson	Episode: "Notes About Courage"
1984	The Love Boat	Andy Brooks	Episode: "The Last Heist/Starting Over/Watching the Master"
1985	Hotel	Link	Episode: "Resolutions"
1985	Hotel	Dr. Michael Vaughn	Episode: "Rallying Cry"
1986–87	The Wizard	Alex Jagger	Main cast (19 episodes)
1987	9 to 5	Ellison	Episode: "My Fair Marsha"
1987–91	Designing Women	Col. Bill Stillfield	Recurring role (13 episodes)
1988	Superboy	Roscoe Williams	Episode: "Countdown to Nowhere"
1988	Murder, She Wrote	Mark Hazlitt	Episode: "Curse of the Daanav"
1989	A Peaceable Kingdom	Daniel Pennington	Episode: "Bison"
1990	Rich Men, Single Women	Richard Hancock	Television film
1990	Spaced Invaders	Sheriff Sam Hoxly	Feature film
1990	Menu for Murder	Charles Henshaw	Television film
1991	Murder, She Wrote	Greg Franklin	Episode: "Terminal Connection"
1991	CBS Schoolbreak Special	Al McBride	Episode: "But He Loves Me"
1991	P.S. I Luv U	John	Episode: "There Goes the Neighbourhood"
1992	Lady Boss	Jerry Masterson	Television miniseries
1994	Temptation	Captain Thomas	Feature film
1994	One West Waikiki	Cmdr. Tom Haber	Episode: "'Til Death Do Us Part"

=== Director ===
Year	Title	Notes
1995	Dead Badge	Feature film
1996	Conundrum	Television film
1994–96	Sweet Valley High	14 episodes
1997	Ed McBain's 87th Precinct: Heatwave	Television film
1997	Perfect Body	Television film
1997	Cloned	Television film
1999	Vanished Without a Trace	Television film
1999	Life's Little Struggles	Television film
1999	Switched at Birth	Television film
2000	Love Lessons	Television film
2001	For Love of Olivia	Television film
2001	Sex, Lies & Obsession	Television film
2003	This Time Around	Television film
2003	Beautiful Girl	Television film
2004	Perfect Romance	Television film
2005	Confessions of an American Bride	Television film
2006	For the Love of a Child	Television film
2007	To Be Fat like Me	Television film
2007	The Note	Television film
2009	Taking a Chance on Love	Television film
2010	Secrets of the Mountain	Television film
2010	The Jensen Project	Television film
2011	Game Time: Tackling the Past	Television film
2012	Notes from the Heart Healer	Television film
2013	The Mystery Cruise	Television film
2014	Northpole	Television film
2015	Northpole: Open for Christmas	Television film
2017	Site Unseen: An Emma Fielding Mystery	Television film
