= Northpole (film) =

- Written by: Gregg Rossen; Brian Sawyer
- Directed by: Douglas Barr
- Starring: Bailee Madison; Tiffani Thiessen; Josh Hopkins; Lori Loughlin; Dermot Mulroney
- Countries of origin: United States; Canada
- Original language: English
- No. of episodes: 2

Production
- Cinematography: Pierre Jodoin
- Running time: 120 minutes

Original release
- Network: Hallmark Channel
- Release: November 15, 2014 – November 21, 2015

Northpole is a 2014 American-Canadian Christmas fantasy television film directed by Douglas Barr. It premiered on the Hallmark Channel on November 15, 2014, and stars Tiffani Thiessen, Josh Hopkins, Bailee Madison and Max Charles. The film was followed by a sequel, Northpole: Open for Christmas, released in November 2015. Bailee Madison returned to play Clementine the Elf while the lead pair was played by Lori Loughlin and Dermot Mulroney.

== Main cast ==
- Bailee Madison as Clementine the Elf
- Stefanie Buxton as Clementine's mother
- Robert Wagner and Donovan Scott as Santa Claus
- Jill St. John as Mrs. Claus
- Tiffani Thiessen as Chelsea Hastings
- Josh Hopkins as Ryan Wilson
- Lori Loughlin as Mackenzie Warren
- Dermot Mulroney as Ian Hanover

== Films ==
No.	Title	Directed by	Written by	Original release date
1	"Northpole"	Douglas Barr	Gregg Rossen, Brian Sawyer	November 15, 2014
Northpole, the magical home to Santa (Robert Wagner) and Mrs. Claus (Jill St. John), has grown into a huge city powered by the magic of holiday happiness around the world. Yet as people everywhere get too busy to enjoy festive time together, the city is in trouble. Who can help save the cherished traditions of Christmas? One young boy, Kevin (Max Charles), might have a chance if he can convince his protective mother, Chelsea (Tiffani Thiessen), to rediscover the magic of the season. With a little added help from Kevin's charming teacher Ryan (Josh Hopkins), a mysterious elf-like girl Clementine (Bailee Madison) and a gospel singer named Josephine (Candice Glover), Kevin is determined to bring his mom in on the fun and prove that one small voice can change the hearts of many.
2	"Northpole: Open for Christmas"	Douglas Barr	Gregg Rossen, Brian Sawyer	November 21, 2015
Santa (Donovan Scott) sends Clementine to save Christmas again by ensuring that new owner of Vermont's Northern Lights Mountain Inn, Mackenzie Warren (Lori Loughlin) not only renovates and keep the Inn open, but that she regain her true spirit of life and Christmas in the process, the first step being to hold the Christmas Eve party. Clementine finds some unexpected help from locals as Mackenzie begins seeing life from a new point of view as she meets the handsome Ian Hanover (Dermot Mulroney).

== Reception ==
Brian Lowry of Variety wrote, "Sweet and inoffensive, one needn't be a complete Grinch to wish the festive doings contained a little more spice and less saccharine." Mary McNamara of the Los Angeles Times wrote, "Northpole may be a cookie-cutter take on Christmas, but it's one with high-quality ingredients." Matt Roush of TV Guide wrote, "It's all very traditional, conventional, satisfying for those who like their schmaltz as concentrated as a double espresso".

== See also ==
- List of Christmas films
- Santa Claus in film
