= Cries from the Heart =

- Also known as: Touch of Truth
- Genre: drama
- Written by: Robert Inman
- Directed by: Michael Switzer
- Starring: Patty Duke; Melissa Gilbert; Bradley Pierce
- Music by: James McVay
- Country of origin: United States
- Original language: English

Production
- Executive producer: Joel S. Rice
- Producers: Joan Barnett; Jack Grossbart
- Cinematography: Robert Draper
- Editor: Robert Florio
- Running time: 120 minutes (93 minutes without commercials)
- Production company: Grossbart Barnett Productions

Original release
- Network: CBS
- Release: October 16, 1994

Cries from the Heart (also known as Touch of Truth) is a 1994 American made-for-television drama film directed by Michael Switzer and starring Patty Duke and Melissa Gilbert, who had co-starred together in two prior films.

== Plot ==
Karen Barth is the divorced mother of Michael, a 7-year-old nonverbal autistic boy. After an incident in which Michael wanders away from home, Karen's ex-husband Roger realizes that Michael may need more specialized care than she can provide, and suggests Michael be sent to a special residential school.

Karen reluctantly enrolls him after therapist Terry Wilson explains how the program will be able to help Michael. Under Terry's care, Michael begins gradually making progress, learning to communicate by pointing to pictures, and doing chores such as making his bed and helping prepare meals in the cottage he shares with his caretaker, Jeff.

Eventually, Terry suggests to Jeff and school head Eliot that they try a form of facilitated communication: having Michael type on a computer keyboard, with Terry supporting his hand. Jeff is outright dismissive, claiming Michael's "not that bright" and "can't even spell." However, Eliot reluctantly agrees to give Terry a one-month trial period with Michael to see if it works.

Michael initially only types gibberish, but a breakthrough finally occurs when Karen comes for a visit and Michael types out "MOM HI". He then reveals something she had never known when he types "DAD GONE" and "I BRAK CAR MY FALT". Karen tells Terry that the night she and Roger divorced, Michael got upset and broke the car window. Karen assures him that she and Roger love him very much, and that the car was not the reason for their divorce.

Karen shares news of her first conversation with Michael to an initially skeptical Roger, admitting to having been wrong about Terry before and thanking him for recommending the school. After mentioning the revelation that Michael thought the divorce was his fault, Roger expresses guilt over having never explained the reason for his departure, but Karen assures him that she set Michael straight, and even if he's not convinced, he'll now be able to tell them.

However, trouble soon looms over the horizon, after Jeff leaves for a vacation. Michael begins having nightmares, neglecting his chores and becoming harder to handle. When Terry asks him why, he types out "JEFF", "KEEP JEFF AWAY" and "SEX". Terry realizes Jeff sexually abused Michael. An enraged Karen criticizes her for not keeping Michael safe. She demands that Michael be pulled from the school, so he'd be safe from Jeff. Terry insists that Michael needs the school, citing the progress Michael has made despite being abused by Jeff. Michael also expresses his desire to remain there: "I STAY". After Jeff is arrested, a detective questions Michael about the abuse; believing him to be credible, he comments to Terry on how impressive this form of communication is.

All is not well for Karen, however. Feeling hurt that Michael had put his trust in Terry rather than his own mother, Karen has cut off all contact, not returning phone calls or showing up for visits and shutting herself up in the house. Finally, Terry pays her a visit and explains that despite all the school has accomplished for Michael, he still needs Karen in his life, and that it's important for them to work together. This gets her to come around.

The preparation for trial is an uphill battle: Jeff has recanted his confession, and the court is reluctant to accept Michael's testimony due to the lack of scientific support for facilitated communication. The jury allows Michael to testify, and though questioning by the district attorney goes off with no problem, Michael gets agitated during the cross-examination by Jeff's attorney, forcing the judge to call a recess. While the defense calls for a mistrial, a compromise is reached: another cross-examination will take place in a separate area, relayed back to the courtroom via closed-circuit TV. While Jeff's attorney keeps calling the validity of facilitated communication and Michael's testimony into question, the jury eventually finds Jeff guilty.

The film ends with Karen and Terry watching Michael play on the swing, and Karen and Terry concluding that although they've got a long way to go, they make a good team.

== Cast ==
- Patty Duke as Terry Wilson
- Melissa Gilbert as Karen Barth
- Bradley Pierce as Michael Barth
- Markus Flanagan as Roger Barth
- Lisa Banes as Marla Tolbert
- Roger Aaron Brown as Eliot
- Peter Spears as Jeff Mace
- Joe Chrest as Brandon Richards
- Troy Evans as detective Frank Bradley
- Shelley Morrison as Lupe
- Raye Birk as judge Harris

== Production and release ==
The film was initially scheduled to air on September 25, 1994. However, CBS feared low ratings because another made-for-TV film, Kelsey Grammer's The Innocent, premiered the same night. It was pushed back three weeks. Upon its release, the film was criticized for its portrayal of an autistic child, but young Bradley Pierce received praise from all critics.

During the late 1990s and 2000s, the film was frequently rerun on Lifetime and its sister channel Lifetime Movie Network, and received a DVD release from MPI Home Video in 2007, as part of its "True Stories Collection".
