= Switched at Birth (1999 film) =

1999 US television film directed by Douglas Barr

- Written by: Arlene Sarner; Jerry Leichtling
- Directed by: Douglas Barr
- Starring: Melissa Gilbert; Rosanna Arquette
- Music by: Stewart Levin
- Country of origin: United States
- Original language: English

Production
- Producer: Robert J. Wilson
- Cinematography: James Bartle
- Editor: Raúl Dávalos
- Running time: 89 minutes

Original release
- Network: CBS
- Release: November 24, 1999

Switched at Birth (also known as Mistaken Identity and Two Babies: Switched at Birth), American made-for-television drama film released in 1999 by Alexander/Enright & Associates and Carlton America. It was filmed in Newberg, Oregon and Portland, Oregon.

== Plot ==
Two baby boys, born more or less at the same time, were switched soon after they had been born. When their families accidentally discover it eighteen months later, they start having troubles deciding who their real children are – the one they have been raising or the one they gave birth to.

== Cast ==
- Melissa Gilbert as Sarah Barlow
- Rosanna Arquette as Linda Wells
- David Andrews as James Barlow
- Ron Snyder as Bert Wells
- James McCaffrey as Darryl
- Mary Mara as Judy
- Susan Barnes as Marie
- Robert Blanche as Dr. Nurenberg
