= This Time Around (film) =

- Written by: Chad Hodge; Nathan Nipper
- Directed by: Douglas Barr
- Starring: Carly Pope; Brian Austin Green; Sara Rue
- Music by: Eric Allaman

Production
- Running time: 120 mins
- Production companies: Never Time Productions; WildRice Productions; ABC Family Original Productions

Original release
- Network: ABC Family Channel
- Release: June 22, 2003

This Time Around is a made-for-television movie starring Carly Pope, Sara Rue and Brian Austin Green. It aired on the ABC Family Channel on June 22, 2003.

== Plot ==
In 8th grade, Melissa Rochester is a shy, geeky girl who has a huge crush on Drew Hesler, the most popular boy in her junior high school. When her missing notebook, with her doodles of hers and Drew's name together, is handed in to the school reception, it is passed around and falls in the hands of Drew and the popular group. They decide to play a prank on Melissa and leave a note in her locker from Drew who tells her to come up to him at lunch and wait to be asked out. Ecstatic after reading the note, and encouraged by her best friend Gabby, Melissa approaches Drew during lunch, but Drew and his friends humiliate her by telling her it was a joke in front of the whole school, prompting Melissa to run away. We are told later in the movie that both Melissa and Gabby transferred to a Catholic high school instead of the regular high school that Drew and the rest of her class attended.

Ten years later, in the present day, Melissa works as an executive in a public relations firm. She has since gained self-confidence, but still has trust issues due to her humiliation at school and refuses to maintain any long-term relationship. When her firm is asked to work for Drew's new restaurant, Melissa is at first reluctant, but is brought around by Gabby when she tells Melissa that she can use this opportunity to get revenge on Drew by making him fall in love with her and then breaking his heart.

The girls use a series of tactics to get Drew to ask Melissa out, and he eventually does, leading to a romantic date at his new restaurant (before it has officially been opened). Drew told Melissa that the investment of his new restaurant is from his own money if it fails he would end up broke. Drew tells Melissa that he's only just broken up with Cara Cabot, the popular girl from their old school who Drew's been dating for 10 years, but he's ready to move on. Melissa and Drew share a tender moment and are about to kiss when Cara walks in the restaurant. Cara tells Melissa to leave and asks Drew to give her a second chance, but Drew declines.

The next day, Drew surprises Melissa at her office and asks her out to shop for flowers. Drew and Melissa grow closer. When Melissa goes over to Drew's restaurant, she is stopped outside by Cara, who lies and says that she and Drew are getting back together. Melissa is disappointed and, egged on by Gabby, phones Drew and leaves a message saying that she's ending their professional relationship (and implies that their personal relationship is over too).

Cara finds out from her mother, who ran into Melissa's mom at the supermarket, that Melissa is "Pissy Missy" from junior high. She reveals this information to Drew, thinking that he'll reject Melissa, but Drew feels guilty what they did to her in junior high and heads over to Melissa's apartment. Gabby opens the door and tells Drew that Melissa is out of town and reveals their plan to break Drew's heart. Drew tells her that he was just a kid back then that he is not same kid he was back in junior high, and he's now a different person. When Drew leaves, Gabby realises that she's made a mistake in getting Melissa to dump Drew, and calls her back so they can go to Drew's grand opening that night.

Melissa arrives at Drew's restaurant, and she and Drew make up. He toasts her hard work in his speech and they end the night with a kiss.

== Cast ==
- Carly Pope as Melissa "Mel" Rochester
- Brian Austin Green as Drew Hesler
- Sara Rue as Gabby Castellani
- Gina Tognoni as Cara Cabot
- Sherry Miller as Mary Ann McNally
- David Lipper as Martin
- Adam Greydon Reid as Jeff Blue
- Matthew Edison as Kevin
- Mallory Margel as Young Melissa "Missy" Rochester
- Gage Knox as young Drew Hesler
- Martha MacIsaac as young Gabby Castellani
- Megan Park as young Cara Cabot
