= List of Christian novels =

This is a list of published titles in the Christian fiction genre, some recently published, some best-sellers.

== Christian fiction books ==
=== Action/adventure ===
- The Stonegate Sword - Harry James Fox
- The Legacy - A Suspense Novel - Ralph Nelson Willett
- The Release - Escape from Torment - Ralph Nelson Willett

=== Historical ===
- Mirror of Shallott - Robert Hugh Benson
- Temperance's Trial; Virtues and Valor Part 1 - Hallee Bridgeman
- Brendan - Frederick Buechner
- Godric - Frederick Buechner
- Dear and Glorious Physician - Taylor Caldwell
- The Red Tent - Anita Diamant
- The Big Fisherman - Lloyd C. Douglas
- Murder Takes the Veil - Margaret Ann Hubbard
- The Bishop's Secret (1900) - Fergus Hume
- Demon: A Memoir - Tosca Lee
- Havah: The Story of Eve - Tosca Lee
- Under Penalty of Death - Kristena Mears
- Christy - Catherine Marshall
- Thomas Wingfield, Curate (1876) - George MacDonald
- Dreaming in Egypt - The Story of Asenath & Joseph - Maria Isabel Pita
- The Last Sin Eater - Francine Rivers
- The Prince - Francine Rivers
- Redeeming Love - Francine Rivers
- Aleriel, or A Voyage to Other Worlds (1883) - Wladislaw Somerville Lach-Szyrma
- In His Steps - Charles Sheldon
- The Name of the Rose - Umberto Eco

=== Contemporary ===
- Gospel: a novel - Wilton Barnhardt
- Sapphire Ice; The Jewel Series Part 1 - Hallee Bridgeman
- Texas Roads; Miller's Creek Book 1 - Cathy Bryant
- Pilgrim's Progress - John Bunyan
- Between Noon and Three: Romance, Law, and the Outrage of Grace - Robert Farrar Capon
- Exit 36: A Fictional Chronicle - Robert Farrar Capon
- The Man Who Met God in a Bar: The Gospel According to Marvin: A Novel - Robert Farrar Capon
- The Brothers Karamazov - Fyodor Dostoevsky
- Divine - Karen Kingsbury
- The Atonement Child - Francine Rivers
- The Monkey Bible - Mark Laxer
- Screwtape Letters - C.S.Lewis
- The Great Divorce - C.S.Lewis
- The Shack - William P. Young
- Cross Roads (novel) - William P. Young
- Eve - William P. Young
- The God Whistle - Ralph Nelson Willett
- The Rose Stone - Ralph Nelson Willett
- Brianna - Ralph Nelson Willett
- The Summer Tourist - Ralph Nelson Willett

== Christian fiction series ==
- Chronicles of Brothers series - Wendy Alec
- The Jewel series - Hallee Bridgeman
- The Song of Suspense series - Hallee Bridgeman
- The Virtues and Valor series - Hallee Bridgeman
- Treason (Navy Justice series) - Don Brown
- The Miller's Creek novels - Cathy Bryant
- The Book of Bebb series - Frederick Buechner
- The Sight series - David Clement-Davies
- Elyon (The Lost Books series) - Ted Dekker
- The Christopher Kiwi series for young children - Gavin Dell and Leigh Dell
- Sober Justice (Mike Connolly Mystery series) - Joe Hilley
- Starbridge series and St Benet's series - Susan Howatch
- Even Now (Lost Love series) - Karen Kingsbury
- The Secret (Seasons of Grace series) - Beverly Lewis
- The Chronicles of Narnia series - C.S. Lewis
- Space Trilogy - C.S.Lewis
- Lucid Dreams & Spiritual Warfare series - Maria Isabel Pita
- As Sure as the Dawn (Mark of the Lion series) - Francine Rivers
- Paris Encore (Zion Covenant series) - Bodie and Brock Thoene
- Lord of the Rings - J. R. R. Tolkien
- Place Called Home series - Lori Wick
- The Lacemaker - Laura Frantz
- Trailblazer Books - Dave and Neta Jackson
- Suddenly Free series - Yvette Carmon Davis
- Voice of Joy series - Sarah Floyd

=== Spiritual (devotional aids) ===
- Journey To The Cross: Devotions For Lent- Will Walker, Kendal Haug
- Prepare Him Room: Celebrating The Birth of Jesus Family Devotional- Marty Machowski
- Long Story Short: Ten-Minute Devotions To Draw Your Family to God- Marty Machowski
- A Small Book For The Anxious Heart: Meditations on Fear, Worry, and Trust- Edward T. Welch
- Darkest Night Brightest Day: A Family Devotional For The Easter Season- Marty Machowski
- Old Story New: Ten-Minute Devotions To Draw Your Family To God- Marty Machowski
- Who Is Jesus? 40 Pictures To Share With Your Family- Kate Hox
- On Mission: Devotions For Your Short-Term Trip- Patric Knaak
- Wonders Of His Love: Finding Jesus in Isaiah, Family Advent Devotional- Champ Thornton
- Listen Up: 10-Minute Family Devotions on The Parables- Marty Machowski
- Saving Grace: Daily Devotions From Jack Miller- John Miller
- A Small Book For The Hurting Heart: Meditations on Loss, Grief, and Healing- Paul Tautges

== See also ==
- Christian novel
- Christian science fiction
- List of Christian fiction authors
