= Louise Fletcher =

American actress (1934–2022)

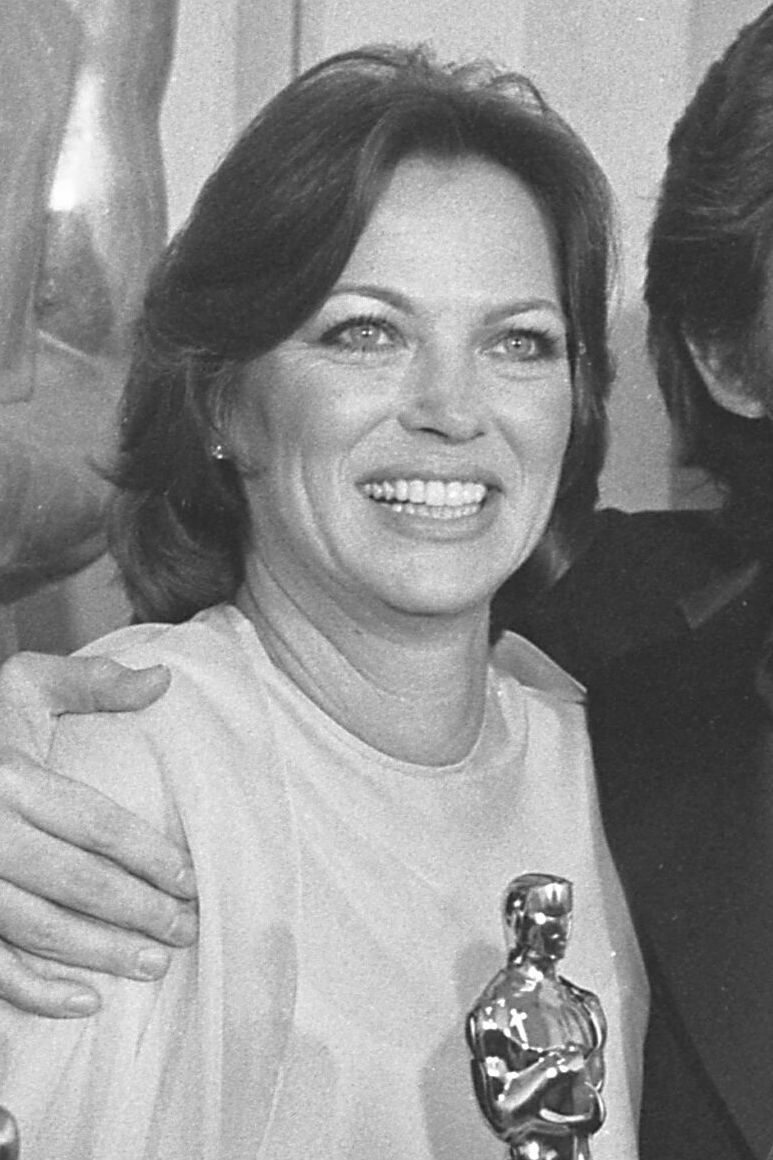
- Fletcher at the 48th Academy Awards (1976)
- Born: Estelle Louise Fletcher; July 22, 1934; Birmingham, Alabama, U.S.
- Died: September 23, 2022 (aged 88); Montdurausse, Tarn, France
- Education: University of North Carolina at Chapel Hill
- Occupation: Actress
- Years active: 1955–2017
- Known for: One Flew Over the Cuckoo's Nest; Star Trek: Deep Space Nine
- Spouse: Jerry Bick (m. 1960; div. 1977)
- Children: 2

Estelle Louise Fletcher (July 22, 1934 – September 23, 2022) was an American actress. She is best known for her portrayal of the antagonist Nurse Ratched in the film One Flew Over the Cuckoo's Nest (1975), which earned her numerous accolades, including the Academy Award, BAFTA Award, and Golden Globe Award for Best Actress.

Fletcher had a recurring role as the Bajoran religious leader Kai Winn Adami in the television series Star Trek: Deep Space Nine (1993–1999). She was nominated for two Emmy Awards for her roles in the television series Picket Fences (1996) and Joan of Arcadia (2004). Her final role was as Rosie in the Netflix series Girlboss (2017).

== Early life ==
Estelle Louise Fletcher was born on July 22, 1934, in Birmingham, Alabama, the second of four children of Estelle (née Caldwell) and the Reverend Robert Capers Fletcher, an Episcopal missionary from Arab, Alabama. Her parents were deaf and worked with the deaf/hard-of-hearing, but Fletcher and her siblings, Roberta, John, and Georgianna, were all hearing, so the children were sent in turns to live with Estelle's hearing sister in Texas for three months at a time to ensure they learned spoken English. Fletcher's father founded more than 40 churches for the deaf in Alabama. She received a bachelor's degree in drama from the University of North Carolina at Chapel Hill in 1957.

== Career ==
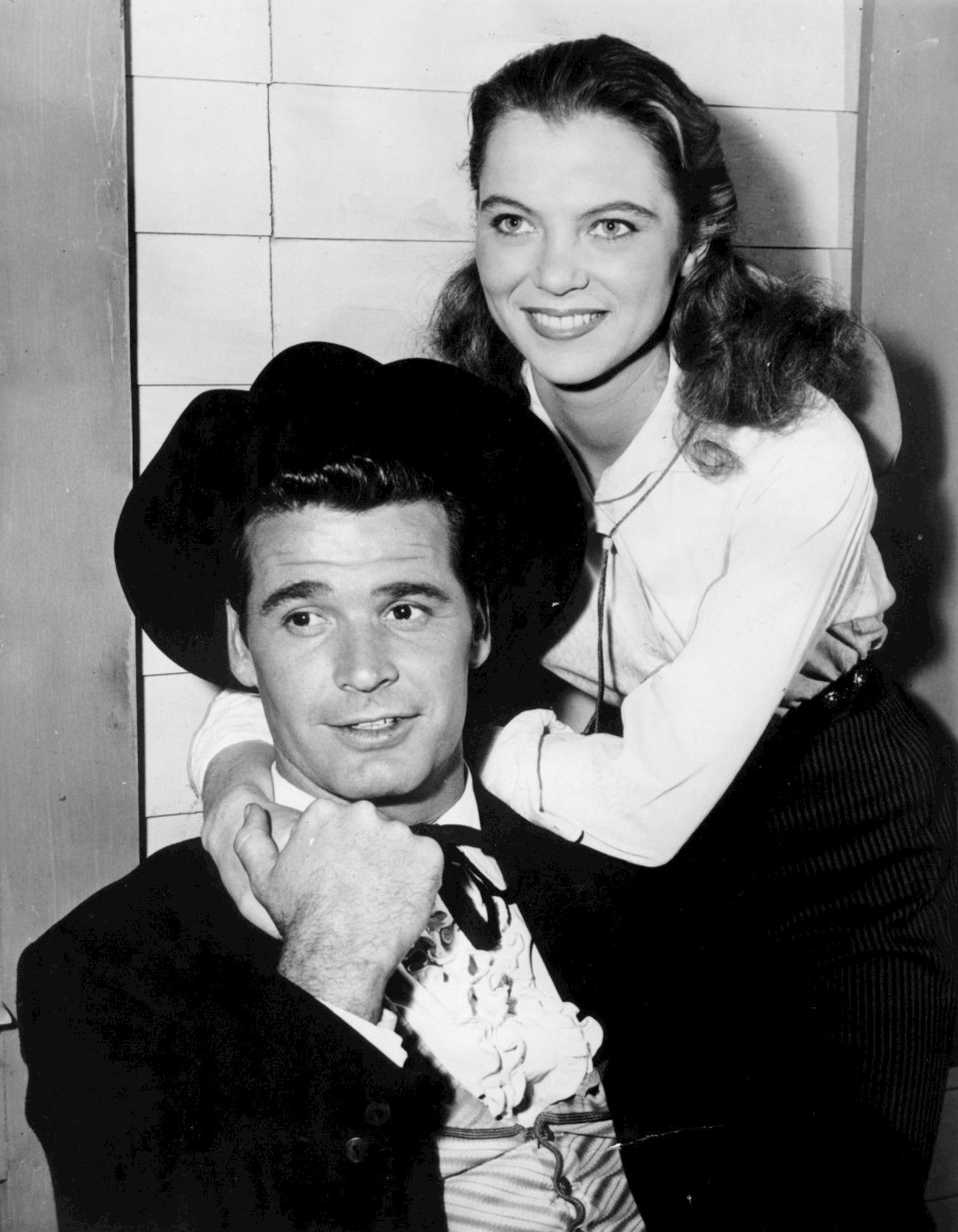
James Garner and Fletcher in Maverick (1959)

Fletcher began appearing in several television series including Lawman (1958) and Maverick (1959). (The Maverick episode "The Saga of Waco Williams" with James Garner was the series's highest-rated episode.) Also in 1959, she appeared in an episode of the original Untouchables television series starring Robert Stack, "Ma Barker and Her Boys", as Elouise. Fletcher recalled having greater success being cast in Westerns due to her height:

I was 5 feet 10 inches [1.78 m] tall, and no television producer thought a tall woman could be sexually attractive to anybody. I was able to get jobs on westerns because the actors were even taller than I was.

— Louise Fletcher (November 1975)

In 1960, Fletcher made two guest appearances on Perry Mason, as defendant Gladys Doyle in "The Case of the Mythical Monkeys", and as Susan Connolly in "The Case of the Larcenous Lady". In the summer of 1960, she was cast as Roberta McConnell in the episode "The Bounty Hunter" of Tate, starring David McLean.

[When conceiving of a way to play Nurse Ratched] [s]he thought back to her childhood in Alabama, and the "paternalistic way that people treat other people there." Moving to California had opened her eyes to how warped things had been back home. "White people actually felt that the life they were creating was good for black people," she says—a dynamic she recognized in Nurse Ratched and her charges. "They're in this ward, she's looking out for them, and they have to act like they're happy to get this medication or listen to this music. And make her feel good about the way she is.

— Michael Schulman profile of Louise Fletcher, Vanity Fair, July 10, 2018

In 1974, Fletcher returned to film in the crime drama Thieves Like Us, co-produced by her husband Jerry Bick and Robert Altman, who also directed. When the two had a falling out on Altman's next project, Nashville (1975), Altman decided to cast Lily Tomlin for the role of Linnea Reese, initially created for and by Fletcher. Meanwhile, director Miloš Forman saw Fletcher in Thieves and cast her as McMurphy's nemesis Nurse Ratched in One Flew Over the Cuckoo's Nest (1975). She based her performance of the character on the paternalistic way she saw white people treat black people in her native Alabama. Fletcher gained international recognition and fame for the role, winning the Academy Award for Best Actress, as well as a BAFTA Award and Golden Globe. She was only the third actress ever to win an Academy Award, BAFTA Award, and Golden Globe Award for a single performance, after Audrey Hepburn and Liza Minnelli. When Fletcher accepted her Oscar, she used sign language to thank her parents.

After Cuckoo's Nest, Fletcher had mixed success in film. She made several financially and critically successful films, while others were box-office failures. Fletcher's film roles were in such features as Exorcist II: The Heretic (1977), The Cheap Detective (1978), The Lady in Red (1979), The Magician of Lublin (1979), Brainstorm (1983), Firestarter (1984), Invaders From Mars (1986), Flowers in the Attic (1987), Two Moon Junction (1988), Best of the Best (1989), Blue Steel (1990), Virtuosity (1995), High School High (1996), and Cruel Intentions (1999), as the aunt of Ryan Phillippe's Sebastian. Additionally, she played the character Ruth Shorter, a supporting role, in Aurora Borealis (2005), alongside Joshua Jackson and Donald Sutherland, and appeared in the Fox Faith film The Last Sin Eater (2007).

Fletcher co-starred in television movies such as The Karen Carpenter Story (1989) (as Karen and Richard Carpenter's mother, Agnes), Nightmare on the 13th Floor (1990), The Haunting of Seacliff Inn (1994), and The Stepford Husbands (1996). From 1993 to 1999, she held a recurring role in Star Trek: Deep Space Nine as the scheming Bajoran religious leader Kai Winn Adami. She also earned Emmy Award nominations for her guest roles on Picket Fences (1996), and later on Joan of Arcadia (2004). In 2009, Fletcher appeared in Heroes as the physician mother of character Emma Coolidge. In 2011 and 2012, she appeared on four episodes of Shameless as Grammy Gallagher, Frank Gallagher's foul-mouthed and hard-living mother, who is serving a prison sentence for manslaughter related to a meth lab explosion. She portrayed the recurring role of Rosie on the series Girlboss (2017).

== Personal life ==
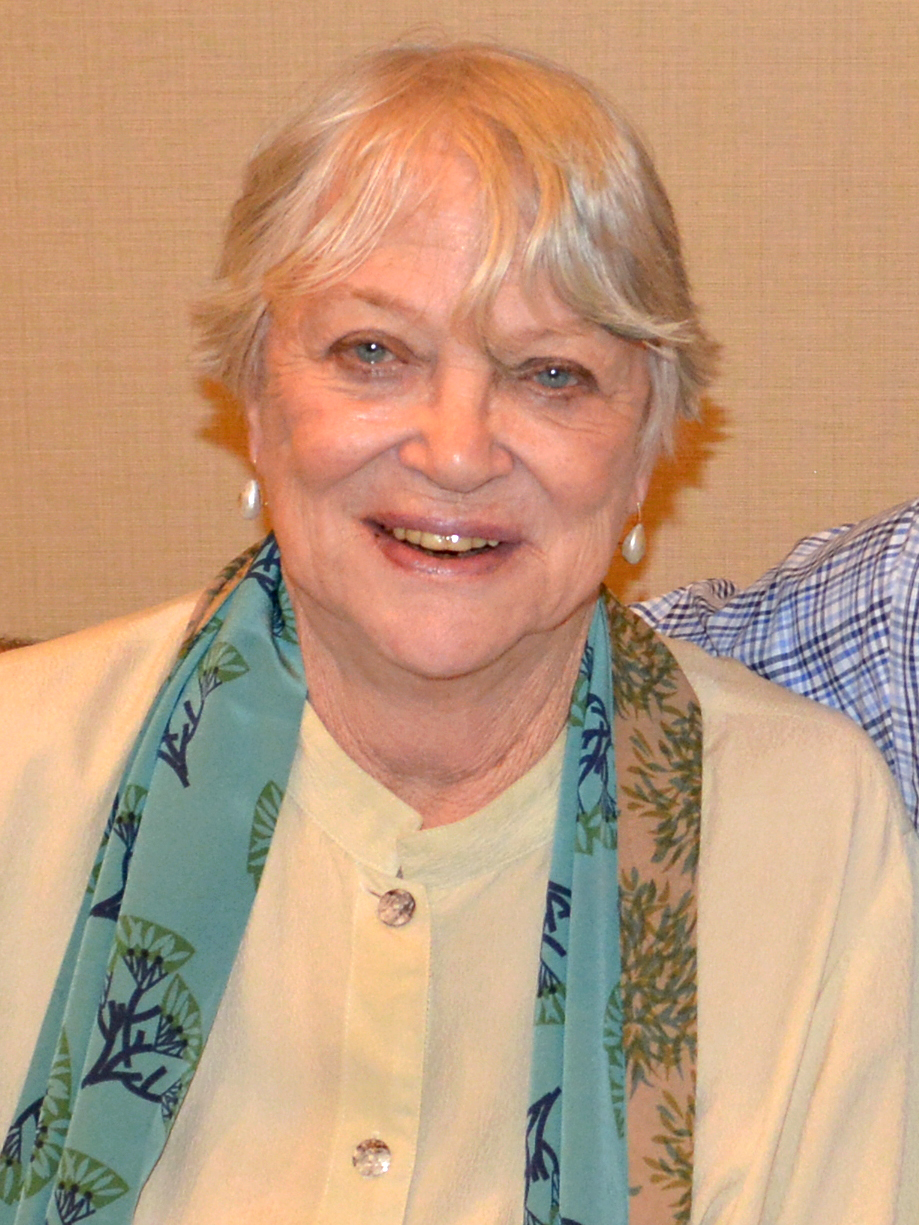
Fletcher in 2014

Fletcher married producer Jerry Bick, divorcing in 1977. The couple had two sons. Fletcher took an 11-year break from acting to raise them.

Fletcher received an honorary degree from Gallaudet University in 1982.

== Death ==
Fletcher died at her home in Montdurausse, France, on September 23, 2022, at the age of 88.

== Filmography ==
=== Film ===
Year	Title	Role	Notes	Ref.
1963	A Gathering of Eagles	Mrs. Kemler		
1974	Thieves Like Us	Mattie		
1975	Russian Roulette	Midge		
1975	One Flew Over the Cuckoo's Nest	Nurse Ratched		
1977	Exorcist II: The Heretic	Dr. Gene Tuskin		
1978	The Cheap Detective	Marlene DuChard		
1979	The Lady in Red	Anna Sage		
1979	The Magician of Lublin	Emilia		
1979	Natural Enemies	Miriam Steward		
1980	The Lucky Star	Loes Bakker		
1980	Mama Dracula	Mama Dracula		
1981	Strange Behavior	Barbara Moorehead		
1981	Be Pretty and Shut Up	Herself	Documentary	
1982	Talk to Me	Richard's Mother		
1983	Strange Invaders	Mrs. Benjamin		
1983	Brainstorm	Lilian Reynolds		
1984	Firestarter	Norma Manders		
1984	Once Upon a Time in America	Cemetery Directress	Extended cut only	
1984	Overnight Sensation	Evie Peregrine / "E.K. Hamilton"	Short	
1986	Invaders from Mars	Mrs. McKeltch		
1986	The Boy Who Could Fly	Dr. Grenader		
1986	Nobody's Fool	Pearl		
1987	Flowers in the Attic	Grandmother		
1988	Two Moon Junction	Belle Delongpre		
1989	Best of the Best	Mrs. Grady		
1990	Shadowzone	Dr. Erhardt		
1990	Blue Steel	Shirley Turner		
1992	The Player	Louise Fletcher		
1992	Blind Vision	Miss Taylor		
1994	Giorgino	Innkeeper		
1994	Tryst	Maggie		
1994	Tollbooth	Lillian		
1995	Return to Two Moon Junction	Belle Delongpre		
1995	Virtuosity	Elizabeth Deane		
1996	Mulholland Falls	Esther	Uncredited	
1996	Edie & Pen	Judge		
1996	Frankenstein and Me	Mrs. Perdue		
1996	2 Days in the Valley	Evelyn		
1996	High School High	Principal Evelyn Doyle		
1997	Gone Fishin'	Restaurant Owner	Uncredited	
1997	The Girl Gets Moe	Gloria		
1998	Johnny 316	Sally's Mother		
1998	Love Kills	Alena Heiss		
1999	Cruel Intentions	Helen Rosemond		
1999	A Map of the World	Nellie Goodwin		
1999	The Contract	Grandma Collins		
2000	Big Eden	Grace Cornwell		
2000	Very Mean Men	Katherine Mulroney		
2000	More Dogs Than Bones	Iva Doll		
2001	After Image	Aunt Cora		
2001	Touched by a Killer	Judge Erica Robertson		
2002	Manna from Heaven	Mother Superior		
2003	Silver Man	Val		
2003	Finding Home	Esther		
2004	Clipping Adam	Grammy		
2005	Aurora Borealis	Ruth Shorter		
2005	Dancing in Twilight	Evelyn		
2006	Fat Rose and Squeaky	Bonnie		
2007	The Last Sin Eater	Miz Elda		
2007	A Dennis the Menace Christmas	Mrs. Martha Wilson		
2010	The Genesis Code	Ellen Taylor		
2011	Cassadaga	Claire		
2013	A Perfect Man	Abbie	Filmed in 2000	
2020	Grizzly II: Revenge	Park Superintendent Eileene Draygon	Filmed in 1983	
2025	Boorman and the Devil	Herself	Documentary; posthumous release	

=== Television ===
Year	Title	Role	Notes	Ref.
1958	Flight	unknown role	"Red China Rescue"	
1958	Playhouse 90	Pete's Girl	2 episodes	
1958	Bat Masterson	Sarah Lou Conant	"Cheyenne Club"	
1958	Yancy Derringer	Miss Nellie / Alithea	"Old Dixie"	
1959	Lawman	Betty Horgan	"The Encounter"	
1959	Maverick	Kathy Bent	"The Saga of Waco Williams"	
1959	77 Sunset Strip	Julia Murphy	"A Bargain in Tombs"	
1959	The Untouchables	Eloise	"Ma Barker and Her Boys"	
1959	Alcoa Presents: One Step Beyond	Jeannie	"The Open Window" (broadcast Nov. 3., US)	
1959	Markham	Ellen Amery	"Strange Visitor"	
1959–1960	Wagon Train	Elizabeth / Martha English	2 episodes	
1960	The Millionaire	Holly	"Millionaire Vance Ludlow"	
1960	Sugarfoot	Julie Frazer	"Funeral at Forty Mile"	
1960	Tate	Mrs. McConnell	"The Bounty Hunter"	
1960	Perry Mason	Susan Connolly / Gladys Doyle	2 episodes	
1961	The Best of the Post	unknown role	"Groper in the Dark"	
1961	The Life and Legend of Wyatt Earp	Aithra McLowery	"The Law Must Be Fair"	
1973	Medical Center	unknown role	"Child of Violence"	
1974	Can Ellen Be Saved?	Bea Lindsey	Television movie	
1978	Thou Shalt Not Commit Adultery	Sally Kimball	Television movie	
1984	Islands	Maureen Davis	Television movie	
1985	A Summer to Remember	Dr. Dolly McKeever	Television movie	
1986	Last Waltz on a Tightrope	Cynthia Diamond	Television movie	
1986	Second Serve	Dr. Sadie M. Bishop	Television movie	
1987	J. Edgar Hoover	Annie M. Hoover	Television movie	
1988	Worlds Beyond	Karen Earl	"Home"	
1988	The Twilight Zone	Dr. Cline	"The Hunters"	
1989	The Karen Carpenter Story	Agnes Carpenter	Television movie	
1989	Final Notice	Mrs. Lord	Television movie	
1990	In the Heat of the Night	Catherine Tyler	"December Days"	
1990	Nightmare on the 13th Floor	Letti Gordon	Television movie	
1991	The Hitchhiker	Mother Birch	"Offspring"	
1991	Tales from the Crypt	Agent	"Top Billing"	
1991	In a Child's Name	Jean Taylor	Miniseries (2 episodes)	
1992	The Boys of Twilight	Genelva McPherson / Genelva	4 episodes	
1992	The Ray Bradbury Theater	Miss Weldon	"The Dead Man"	
1992	Civil Wars	Judge Francis Wyler	"The Triumph of DeVille"	
1993	The Fire Next Time	Sarge	Miniseries	
1993–1999	Star Trek: Deep Space Nine	Kai Winn / Vedek Winn	recurring role (14 episodes)	
1994	The Haunting of Seacliff Inn	Dorothy O'Hara	Television movie	
1994	Someone Else's Child	Faye Maddox	Television movie	
1995	Dream On	Joanna	"Try Not to Remember"	
1995–1997	VR.5	Mrs. Nora Bloom	recurring role (6 episodes)	
1996	Picket Fences	Christine Bey	2 episodes	
1996	Roseanne	Mrs. Betts	"Out of the Past"	
1996	The Stepford Husbands	Miriam Benton	Television movie	
1997	Sins of the Mind	D. Anna Bingham	Television movie	
1997	Married to a Stranger	Nana, Megan's Mother	Television movie	
1997	Heartless	Aunt Lydia McGuffy	Television movie	
1997	Breast Men	Mrs. Saunders	Television movie	
1998	Profiler	Miriam Newquay, Jack's Mother	2 episodes	
1998	The Practice	Judge N. Swanson	"Rhyme and Reason"	
1998	Fantasy Island	Doris Leeman	"Dying to Dance"	
1998	Brimstone	Evelyn McNabb	"Encore"	
1999	The Devil's Arithmetic	Aunt Eva	Television movie	
1999	Time Served	Warden Mildred Reinecke	Television movie	
2003	A Time to Remember	Billy Calhoun	Television movie	
2004	It's All Relative	ER Nurse	"Oscar Interrupts"	
2004	Joan of Arcadia	Eva Garrison	"Do the Math"	
2004	Wonderfalls	Vivian Caldwell	"Barrel Bear"	
2005	7th Heaven	Mrs. Wagner	"Honor Thy Mother"	
2005	ER	Roberta "Birdie" Chadwin	2 episodes	
2006	A Dad for Christmas	Glennie	Television movie	
2009	Heroes	Dr. Coolidge	2 episodes	
2010–2011	Private Practice	Frances Wilder	2 episodes	
2011–2012	Shameless	Peg Gallagher	(4 episodes)	
2012	Of Two Minds	Aunt Will	Television movie	
2017	Girlboss	Rosie	2 episodes	

== Accolades ==
Association	Year	Category	Nominated work	Results	Ref.
AARP Movies for Grownups Awards	2007	Best Grownup Love Story (shared with Donald Sutherland)	Aurora Borealis	Nominated	
Academy Awards	1975	Best Actress	One Flew Over the Cuckoo's Nest	Won	
BAFTA Awards	1977	Best Actress in a Leading Role	One Flew Over the Cuckoo's Nest	Won	
CinEuphoria Awards	2020	Career — Honorary Award	—N/a	Won	
Genie Awards	1981	Best Performance by a Foreign Actress	The Lucky Star	Nominated	
Gold Derby Awards	2012	Drama Guest Actress	Shameless	Nominated	
Golden Globes	1976	Best Performance by an Actress in a Motion Picture — Drama	One Flew Over the Cuckoo's Nest	Won	
New York Film Critics Circle Awards	1975	Best Supporting Actress	One Flew Over the Cuckoo's Nest	Nominated	-->
Online Film & Television Association	1997	Best Guest Actress in a Syndicated Series	Star Trek: Deep Space Nine	Won	
Online Film & Television Association	1997	Best Guest Actress in a Drama Series	Star Trek: Deep Space Nine	Won	
Online Film & Television Association	1998	Best Guest Actress in a Syndicated Series	Star Trek: Deep Space Nine	Won	
Online Film & Television Association	1999	Best Guest Actress in a Drama Series	Star Trek: Deep Space Nine	Nominated	
Online Film & Television Association	1999	Best Guest Actress in a Syndicated Series	Star Trek: Deep Space Nine	Won	
Online Film & Television Association	2012	Best Guest Actress in a Drama Series	Shameless	Won	
Palm Beach International Film Festival	2005	Legend in Film Award	—N/a	Won	
Primetime Emmy Awards	1996	Outstanding Guest Actress in a Drama Series	Picket Fences (for episode "Bye Bye, Bey Bey")	Nominated	
Primetime Emmy Awards	2004	Outstanding Guest Actress in a Drama Series	Joan of Arcadia (for episode "Do the Math")	Nominated	
Satellite Awards	1998	Best Actress in a Supporting Role in a Miniseries or Motion Picture Made for Television	Breast Men	Nominated	-->
Satellite Awards	2016	Mary Pickford Award	—N/a	Won	
Saturn Awards	1984	Best Actress	Brainstorm	Won	
Saturn Awards	1988	Best Supporting Actress	Flowers in the Attic	Nominated	
