= Redeeming Love =

Redeeming Love may refer to:

- Redeeming Love (novel), a 1991 historical romance novel by Francine Rivers
- Redeeming Love (2022 film), an American Christian Western romance film, based on the novel
- Redeeming Love (1916 film), an American drama silent film
