= Living Bibles International =

Living Bibles International (LBI) (1968–1992) was an American religious publisher dedicated to producing modern language translations of the New Testament in around 100 languages worldwide.

The foundation was started by Kenneth N. Taylor as an extension of his work on Tyndale House (1962) and The Living Bible in English (1971). In 1986 LBI moved to Naperville, Illinois. LBI merged in 1992 with the International Bible Society (IBS, founded 1809).

== Wikipedia content in relation to specific LBI translations ==
- Bible translations (Amharic), NT 1985
- Bible translations (Arabic), NT 1971
- Bible translations (Chinese), NT 1983
