= The Scarlet Thread =

1996 novel by Francine Rivers

- 1997 edition
- Author: Francine Rivers
- Language: English
- Genre: Christian novel
- Publisher: Tyndale House
- Publication date: 1996
- Publication place: United States
- Media type: Print (Hardback & Paperback)

The Scarlet Thread is a 1996 novel written by Francine Rivers. It was published by Tyndale House Publishers.
