= Voices in the Wind =

Voices in the Wind may refer to:

- Voices in the Wind (album), 1992 release by American country music singer Suzy Bogguss
- Voices in the Wind (film), 2020 Japanese drama directed by Nobuhiro Suwa

== See also ==
- Voice in the Wind, 1944 American film noir directed by Arthur Ripley
- A Voice in the Wind, 1993 American Christian series novel by Francine Rivers
- Wind-Voice, character in Sword Quest, 2008 children's novel by Chinese-American author Nancy Yi Fan
