= Kenneth N. Taylor =

Religious author and publisher (1917–2005)

Kenneth Taylor
- A headshot of Kenneth Taylor ca. 1938.
- Born: Kenneth Nathaniel Taylor; May 8, 1917; Portland, Oregon, U.S.
- Died: June 10, 2005 (aged 88); Wheaton, Illinois, U.S.
- Education: Wheaton College
- Occupations: Publisher and author
- Known for: Creating The Living Bible
- Children: 10

Kenneth Nathaniel Taylor (May 8, 1917 – June 10, 2005) was an American publisher and author, better known as the creator of The Living Bible and the founder of Tyndale House, a Christian publishing company, and Living Bibles International.

== Early life and education ==
Taylor was born in 1917 in Portland, Oregon. His parents were George and Charlotte Huff Taylor. His father was a Presbyterian minister. He graduated from high school in 1934 from Beaverton High School in Beaverton, OR and enrolled in Wheaton College in Wheaton, Illinois. He graduated from Wheaton in 1938. In 1940, Taylor began to work on a Th.D. at Dallas Theological Seminary. During the course of his studies he was offered the position of editor for HIS Magazine, headquartered in Chicago. Taylor moved back to Wheaton, began working at the magazine, and finished his theological degree at Northern Baptist Seminary. He was a long-time member of College Church in Wheaton.

== Bible translation ==
Taylor worked briefly with Clyde Dennis, founder of Good News Publishers, on translating Gospel tracts and distributing them overseas. In 1947 he moved to Moody Bible Institute, where he served as Director of Moody Press (now called Moody Publishing) until 1963. During that time he assisted with distribution of Christian literature in Mexico.

Taylor developed a series of Bible stories with pictures for his own children to read in 1954. They were eventually published by Moody Press in a book called The Bible in Pictures for Little Eyes in 1962. This book has now sold more than 1.5 million copies. Taylor followed this volume with Stories for the Children's Hour and Devotions for the Children's Hour (both also published by Moody).

After these books were published Taylor began working on an ambitious project—the Bible in a paraphrased and easy-to-read modern language. He published the New Testament epistles under the title Living Letters at his own expense in 1962. His Bible paraphrase was successful enough to allow him to leave Moody Press and work exclusively at Tyndale. Taylor finished the entire Bible in contemporary language and published it as The Living Bible in 1971. The Living Bible topped U.S. bestseller lists in both 1972 and 1973, and its total sales have since exceeded 40 million copies.

Taylor stepped down as chairman and CEO of Tyndale House in 1984, and was succeeded by his son, Mark D. Taylor, who kept the position until 2020.

A special edition of Taylor's Living Bible was published in 1984 in conjunction with a marketing campaign sponsored by the Christian Broadcasting Network. This edition, titled The Book, was featured in People magazine, but was interpreted by some as containing anti-Jewish sentiments and anachronistic expressions.

In the late 1980s, Taylor and his colleagues at Tyndale House Publishers invited a team of 90 Greek and Hebrew scholars to participate in a project of revising the text of The Living Bible. After many years of work, the result was an entirely new translation of the Bible. It was published in 1996 as the Holy Bible: New Living Translation (NLT).

== Personal life and death ==
Taylor married Margaret West in 1940, and together they had 10 children. He died on June 10, 2005, from heart failure.

== Kenneth N. Taylor Lifetime Achievement Award ==
Since 1981, the Evangelical Christian Publishers Association (ECPA) has presented lifetime achievement awards to those who have significantly impacted the Christian publishing industry. In 1984, Taylor was the second recipient of that award. In 2017, to reflect the impact Taylor had on the Christian publishing industry, the award program was renamed the Kenneth N. Taylor Lifetime Achievement Award.

== Books Authored by Kenneth N. Taylor ==
INTERVARSITY PRESS

- Is Christianity Credible?, 1948

MOODY PRESS

- Stories for the Children's Hour, 1953
- Devotions for the Children's Hour, 1954
- Lost on the Trail, 1954
- The Bible in Pictures for Little Eyes, 1956
- Living Thoughts for the Children's Hour, 1958 (originally, I See)
- A Living Letter for the Children's Hour, 1968 (originally, Romans for the Children's Hour, 1959)
- The New Testament in Pictures for Little Eyes, 1989
- The New Bible in Pictures for Little Eyes, 2002

TYNDALE HOUSE PUBLISHERS

- Living Letters, 1962
- Living Prophecies, 1965
- Living Gospels, 1966
- The Living New Testament, 1967
- Living Psalms and Proverbs, 1967
- Living Lessons of Life and Love, 1968
- Almost Twelve, 1968
- Living Books of Moses, 1969
- Living History of Israel, 1970
- Taylor's Bible Story Book, 1970
- The Living Bible, 1971
- Creation and Evolution, 1977
- Living Bible Story Book, 1979
- Lost on the Trail (revised edition), 1980
- What High School Students Should Know about Creation, 1983 (originally, Creation and the High School Student, 1969)
- Big Thoughts for Little People, 1983
- The Book, 1984
- Giant Steps for Little People, 1985
- Wise Words for Little People, 1987
- Next Steps for New Christians, 1989 (originally, How to Grow, Oliver-Nelson Books, 1985)
- My First Bible in Pictures, 1989
- The Bible for Children (coeditor), 1990
- Good News for Little People, 1991
- My Life: A Guided Tour, 1991 (updated 2002)
- Stories about Jesus, 1994 (adapted from Good News for Little People)
- Everything a Child Should Know about God, 1996
- My First Bible Words (with William Noller), 1998
- Family Devotions for Children, 1999
- Right Choices, 1999
- A Child's First Bible (DK series), 2000
- Family-Time Bible, 2003 (originally, The Family-Time Bible in Pictures, 1992)

== See also ==
- New Living Translation
