= An Echo in the Darkness =

1994 novel by Francine Rivers

- First edition
- Author: Francine Rivers
- Language: English
- Publisher: Tyndale House Publishers
- Publication place: United States
- Pages: 461 pages
- ISBN: 0842313079
- Preceded by: A Voice in the Wind
- Followed by: As Sure as the Dawn

An Echo in the Darkness (1994) is the second novel in the Mark of the Lion series by Francine Rivers. It was awarded a RITA Award for best inspirational romance by the Romance Writers of America in 1995.

== Synopsis ==
The book begins where A Voice in the Wind left off, in the arena where Hadassah is thrown to the lions because her owner was jealous of her purity. A young physician, Alexander, must choose one of the mauled bodies in the arena to examine in order to further his knowledge as a physician. He chooses Hadassah's, only to discover that she is alive and that the lion has struck no vital organs. On a sudden impulse, Alexander saves Hadassah and nurses her back to health. Although she remains crippled and wears veils to conceal her scarred face, she regains the ability to walk and talk.

Meanwhile, Marcus Lucianus Valerian, believing that Hadassah is dead, tries to deal with his grief by traveling to Israel (Hadassah's homeland) and learning about Hadassah's God.

Throughout the book, Julia Valerian contracts a fatal illness due to her immoral lifestyle and promiscuous behavior and slowly dies of a wasting disease. Her husband has left her and cheated her out of her wealth, and her manipulative friend and lover has also abandoned her. Hadassah, who has become Alexander's assistant, learns of her old mistress' destitution and bereavement and decides to move in with Julia and care for her until she dies. Hadassah covers her scars (and identity) with veils and heavy clothing.

As she leaves Alexander, he admits his feelings for her, but she knows that he is not who she was meant to be with and admits that she really only loves him as a brother and dear friend. As Hadassah tries to bring spiritual salvation to Julia, she finds herself feeling sorry for her and ultimately forgives Julia completely for attempting to kill her. However, she is still scared of how Julia might react if her true identity is discovered.

As Julia's life nears its end, her brother Marcus returns from Israel to manage her affairs. Though Marcus accepted Christ during the time he spent in Israel, he is still extremely bitter towards his sister and unwilling to forgive her for sending Hadassah to the arena. When it is clear that Julia is about to die, Hadassah reveals her true identity to her. She tells Julia that she has forgiven her long ago and that Christ has forgiven her as well. Julia becomes a Christian and is reconciled to Hadassah. Hadassah had not realized that Marcus was listening outside Julia's bedchamber the whole time and that he has now discovered her true identity. He takes Julia to the baths to be baptized before she dies peacefully. He then chases after Hadassah, who had fled back to Alexander's, fearing Marcus would think her scars were ugly and reject her. Marcus finds Hadassah and confesses that he still loves her, and that she is beautiful to him despite her disfiguring scars. Marcus grants Hadassah her freedom and the two are married. They have many children together and continue to do Christ's work as Christians are continually persecuted throughout the Empire.
