= A Lineage of Grace =

Series of novellas by Francine Rivers

- 2004 edition cover
- Author: Francine Rivers
- Language: English
- Series: A Lineage of Grace
- Genre: Christian
- Publisher: Tyndale House Publishers
- Publication date: 2002 (first edition)
- Publication place: United States
- Media type: Print, Audio, e-book
- Pages: 516 pp (first edition, paperback)
- ISBN: 0-8423-7110-9
- Dewey Decimal: 813/.54 21

A Lineage of Grace is a series of five historical fiction novellas written by the American author Francine Rivers. Each novella details the story of a woman in the lineage of Jesus Christ described in the New Testament - Tamar, Rahab, Ruth, Bathsheba, and Mary. The book was released in 2002 by Tyndale House Publishers. It has been published in hardcover, paperback, audio and e-book versions in several languages.

== Awards ==
A Lineage of Grace won the Retailer's Choice Award in 2009.
