= As Sure as the Dawn =

1995 novel by Francine Rivers

- Author: Francine Rivers
- Language: English
- Publisher: Tyndale House Publishers
- Publication place: United States
- Media type: Print
- Pages: 488 pp
- ISBN: 978-0842339766
- OCLC: 27684136
- Dewey Decimal: 813/.54 20
- LC Class: PS3568.I83165 V65 1993
- Preceded by: An Echo in the Darkness

As Sure as the Dawn (1995) is a novel by Francine Rivers, and the third book in the Mark of the Lion Series.

The novel follows the life of Atretes after winning his freedom in the arena. This novel covers the search for his believed dead son, finding him with a widowed Christian woman, Rizpah, and their travels back to Atretes' homeland in Germania. Here a whole new world unfolds as Atretes is confronted with Christianity, loyalty, love, friendship, family and tradition.
