= Her Mother's Hope =

Book by Francine Rivers

- First edition
- Author: Francine Rivers
- Language: English
- Series: Marta's Legacy Series
- Genre: Novel
- Published: 2010, Tyndale House
- Publication place: United States
- Media type: Print
- Pages: 498
- ISBN: 9781414318639
- OCLC: 436617217
- Followed by: Her Daughter's Dream

Her Mother's Hope is a fictional romance novel written by Francine Rivers in 2010. The novel made The New York Times Best Seller list in April 2010.

== Plot ==
Her Mother's Hope follows a family as they discover what sacrifices it takes to show unconditional love. As the first in a family saga, the story begins with Marta Schneider as she leaves Switzerland and embarks upon a journey that will forever change the course of her family's history. As she suffers wars and hardships, she is determined to have her way until she has kids of her own. Her stubbornness gives her strength to raise strong children. But Hildemara, her oldest daughter, misinterprets this strength for distance. As World War II approaches, Hildie forges her own path to win her mother's respect. But when an illness overtakes her, will her own daughter misinterpret her love as distance as well? This explored further in the book's 2010 sequel, 'Her Daughter's Dream' which carries the family saga from the 1950s to the present day.
