= The Supper of the Lamb =

1969 book by Robert Farrar Capon

- Cover of the first edition
- Author: Robert Farrar Capon
- Language: English
- Genre: Food writing
- Publication date: 1969
- Publication place: United States

The Supper of the Lamb is a food book by Robert Farrar Capon. It was first published in 1969, and has been republished several times. It has been included in the Modern Library Food series.

Capon was an Episcopal priest, and Lauren Winner describes this book as "part cookbook, part theological meditation – something like M. F. K. Fisher meets the desert fathers." Frederick Buechner described it as transcending category: "To call The Supper of the Lamb a cookbook would be like calling Moby Dick a whaling manual." Cookery author Tamar Adler describes this recipe as "...the single most sensible meat recipe I've ever read".

The title is an allusion to the "marriage supper of the Lamb" depicted in the 19th chapter of the Book of Revelation, as well as a recipe for "Lamb for eight persons four times", which forms the basis for most of the book's discussions. One of the recipes is called "Lamb for Eight Persons Four Times" and takes up half of the book. It produces thirty-two servings of food from one leg of lamb.

The book is not a cookbook in the strictest sense – it covers a wide variety of theological topics in between segments on cooking. A reader must read a good deal of the book in order to make the flagship recipe.
