= Aurora Borealis (film) =

- Theatrical release poster
- Directed by: James C.E. Burke
- Written by: Brent Boyd
- Produced by: Scott Disharoon
- Starring: Joshua Jackson; Donald Sutherland; Juliette Lewis; Louise Fletcher
- Cinematography: Alar Kivilo
- Edited by: Richard Nord
- Music by: Mychael Danna
- Distributed by: Regent Releasing
- Release dates: April 22, 2005 (Tribeca Film Festival); September 16, 2006 (United States)
- Running time: 110 minutes
- Countries: United States; Canada
- Language: English

Aurora Borealis is a 2005 romantic drama film directed by James C.E. Burke and starring Joshua Jackson, Donald Sutherland, Juliette Lewis, and Louise Fletcher.

== Plot ==
Duncan is an unemployed youth, trying to cope with the death of his father ten years ago. The film is set in Minneapolis, Minnesota.

Duncan's grandparents, Ronald and Ruth move into an apartment with a very nice view. Ron claims that he has seen the Northern Lights aka Aurora Borealis from the balcony. Ron is fast deteriorating with Alzheimer's disease. Kate is the home assistant of Ron and Ruth.

In order to be close to his grandparents, Duncan finds a job as a handyman at the building where they are staying. There he meets Kate and the two quickly fall in love. Meanwhile, Duncan takes care of Ron and helps out Ron in coping with his condition.

Duncan does not want to leave the town he grew up in. He is not able to free himself from his fears of the past and his sorrow of his father's death. Ron nudges him to do something with his life. He tells Kate that Duncan needs someone who can push him to action. Kate too suggests that Duncan move on with his life.

Kate announces that she has chosen to move to San Diego. This hurts Duncan, but he is still not ready to leave.

Ron wants to end his life and misery. He asks Duncan to buy him some shells for his shotgun. In a moment of despair, Duncan loads the shotgun and gives it to Ron, but he is not able to position the gun so that he can pull the trigger with his toe. The gun goes off and Duncan runs inside. Ron follows but has a heart attack and dies.

Kate leaves for San Diego and Duncan says his goodbyes. On reaching her new place, she sees Duncan at the doorstep, ready to give his life a fresh start.

== Cast ==
- Joshua Jackson as Duncan Shorter
- Steven Pasquale as Jacob Shorter
- Katie Griffin as Sandy
- Zack Ward as Lindstrom
- Tyler Labine as Finn
- Donald Sutherland as Ronald Shorter
- Louise Fletcher as Ruth Shorter
- Mark Andrada as Clerk
- Juliette Lewis as Kate
- Judy Sinclair as Linda Shorter
- John Kapelos as Stu
- Dorion Davis as Lucy
- Timm Sharp as Hacksetter

== Reception ==
On the review aggregator website Rotten Tomatoes, 68% of 38 critics' reviews are positive, with an average rating of 6.2/10. The website's consensus reads: "Deeply reminiscent of other, better films, Aurora Borealis nonetheless succeeds on the strength of winning performances from Sutherland and Jackson." Metacritic, which uses a weighted average, assigned the film a score of 58 out of 100, based on 13 critics, indicating "mixed or average" reviews.
