= The Last Sin Eater =

1998 novel by Francine Rivers

- First edition
- Author: Francine Rivers
- Language: English
- Genre: Christian novel
- Publisher: Tyndale House Publishers
- Publication date: 1998
- Publication place: United States
- Media type: Print (Paperback)
- Pages: 336 pp

The Last Sin Eater is a 1998 Christian book by the American author Francine Rivers. It deals with the themes of sin, guilt and forgiveness, and tells about the atonement of Jesus Christ.

== Plot summary ==
The Last Sin Eater revolves around Cadi Forbes, ten-year-old girl who lives in a settlement community of Welsh Americans in the mid-1850s. Cadi carries a heavy burden of guilt and grief because of something that happened the year before. At the beginning of the novel, Cadi's grandmother Gorawen has just died. At her funeral, the village's sin-eater comes and Cadi does the "forbidden" and makes eye contact with him. The next day, Cadi goes to the river, thinking about how to get rid of the sins that she carries. At that time, a little girl named Lilybet appears, and after talking with her, Cadi decides to visit the Sin Eater in the hopes that he can take her sins from her. Cadi is the only one who can see or hear Lilybet, and her parents and others begin to believe that she is "keeping company with taints" and that the girl is a demon. Cadi seeks out the Sin Eater by talking first to Elda Kendric who is the oldest person in the village.

During all of this, a man of God comes to share the word of God, but camps outside the village. Brogan Kai, the self-proclaimed village leader tells all of the villagers not to go near the man because of what the man speaks of. Brogan's son Fagan and Cadi go anyway. They are intrigued by the word of God, but do not approach the man out of fear. Cadi becomes even more determined to find the Sin Eater, believing she cannot go before the man of God with her sins. Cadi eventually finds the Sin Eater and convinces him to try to take away her sins if she promises to see the man of God and tell the Sin Eater what he says. The Sin Eater performs the ceremony, but nothing happens and no sins are removed. Eventually, it is revealed that the year before, Cadi's little sister drowned after following Cadi to the river and slipping on the log bridge. Cadi is overwhelmed with guilt because of this, and it is tearing her family apart. Cadi thinks that everyone blames her, and sees her mother's distant and withdrawn behavior as proof that her mother hates her. In one scene, Cadi overhears her parents talking and her mother says "it shouldn't have been Elen", implying that she wishes it was Cadi who had drowned.

Despite the danger of being caught, Cadi goes back to talk to the man of God because of her promise to the Sin Eater. After listening to him for a time, she opens up to him, pouring out her guilt, and through his guidance comes to accept Christ and is baptized. Cadi shares her newfound faith with Miz Elda, Fagan notices the difference in her and, driven by his own motives to somehow unburden himself from the sins of his father, visits the man of God with Cadi the next night. Through the man's moving testimony, Fagan, as well, comes to accept Christ. The two children return night after night to learn more from the man, and begin to share what they know with the people around them. Tragedy strikes in the form of Brogan Kai, who kills the man of God, then turns his fury onto his son, Fagan, seriously injuring him. Cadi and Fagan escape, eventually, to Dead Man's Mountain, where the Sin Eater Lives. There, in the safety of his cave, Fagan and Cadi reveal the word of God to the Sin Eater, who is finally relieved of his burden of carrying the sins of so many others. While there, Cadi discovers cave paintings that, once explained by Miz Elda, finally bring to light the dark past of the mountain community and explain the origins of the Sin Eater. In the end, Brogan, Fagan, and the Sin Eater have a showdown in front of the entire village at Elda Kendric's house. Cadi and Fagan, with help from Miz Elda and Iona Kai, reveal the truth to the villagers, and the Sin Eater, named Sim, is free to live as a normal man. During the confrontation, the Kai is injured, and the villagers come to realize he has no power over them other than what they give him. Several come to accept Christ that day, with others following later. Cadi's mother forgives her, saying she never blamed Cadi for Elen's death, but rather herself. She reveals that it was in fact herself she wishes had died in Elen's place, as she had sent Elen after Cadi on the day she drowned. She calls Cadi by the nickname she used when Cadi was small: "li'l bit of heaven.", i.e. Lilybet of heaven, with points to the fact that Lilybet may be an angel of God.

== Film adaptations ==
In 2007, The Last Sin Eater was made into a feature film, directed by Michael Landon Jr.
