= The Last Sin Eater (film) =

- US Poster for "The Last Sin Eater"
- Directed by: Michael Landon Jr.
- Screenplay by: Brian Bird; Michael Landon Jr.
- Based on: The Last Sin Eater by Francine Rivers
- Produced by: Brian Bird; Michael Landon Jr.
- Starring: Liana Liberato; Louise Fletcher; Henry Thomas
- Cinematography: Robert Seaman
- Edited by: Michael Landon Jr.
- Music by: Mark McKenzie
- Production company: Believe Pictures
- Distributed by: Fox Faith
- Release date: February 9, 2007
- Running time: 117 minutes
- Country: United States
- Language: English
- Budget: $2.2 million
- Box office: $388,390

The Last Sin Eater is an American film released on February 9, 2007, directed by Michael Landon Jr. and distributed by Fox Faith. It is based on the 1998 novel of the same name by Francine Rivers. It was produced by Believe Pictures.

== Plot ==
The Last Sin Eater is a story that takes place in 1850s Appalachia in a settlement community of Welsh Americans. Ten-year-old Cadi's grief over the death of her beloved grandmother, the only person who seemed to love her unconditionally, is compounded by a previous family tragedy for which she believes her family blames her. During her grandmother's funeral rites, Cadi sees the face of the village sin-eater, a person who absolves the deceased, at death, of their sins in this tiny Smoky Mountain community.

About the same time, a preacher comes to the isolated valley and camps outside the village. Through dialogue with the holy man, the young girl slowly realizes that the sin eater is false and learns of Jesus and Christianity. Cadi's baptism leads to a reconciliation with her family.

But Cadi's new found faith leads to tragedy and confrontation as the close-knit community must finally face the horrific secret on which their village was founded.

== Cast ==
- Henry Thomas as Man of God
- Louise Fletcher as Miz Elda
- Liana Liberato as Cadi Forbes
- Soren Fulton as Fagan Kai
- Stewart Finlay-McLennan as Brogan Kai
- Gabrielle Fitzpatrick as Bletsung McLeod
- Peter Wingfield as The Sin Eater

== Reception ==
=== Box office ===
The Last Sin Eater was unsuccessful commercially. It was released in 429 theaters and remained in theaters for just two weeks. It fell far short of recovering production costs: according to Box Office Mojo the film grossed only $388,390 in these 14 days. However, the film earned $246,483 in its opening weekend (63.5% of total income).

=== Reviews ===
The Last Sin Eater received mixed reviews. Matt Zoller Seitz of The New York Times said, "Handsomely produced, earnestly performed and 100 percent irony-free, The Last Sin Eater is religious art for mainstream consumption." The review gave credit to the direction and photography, saying, "The movie is a big-screen Sunday school story with sumptuous scenery, graceful crane shots and Rembrandt lighting—designed mainly to impart and then repeat wisdom about guilt, sin and redemption—this can't really be considered a flaw." Laura Kelly of South Florida Sun-Sentinel said, "With its dulling straightforward pitch for Jesus, The Last Sin Eater seems like the worst of films from a non-born-again perspective."

Marjorie Baumgarten of The Austin Chronicle said of the direction of The Last Sin Eater, "The camera always seems to be too far off when you wish to get a better look and too close when you wish that it would point at anything other than what’s in the frame." However, Betty Joe Tucker of Reel Talk was impressed by the cinematography, saying, "This extremely well-photographed film establishes a compelling 'you are there' atmosphere. It also boasts impressive performances by children and adult actors alike. Liana Liberato, who plays Cadi, is a real find. Because of the intensity and vulnerability she projects." Additionally, Variety complimented the look of the film: "Pic was attractively lensed by Robert Seaman in Utah locales that adequately double for Appalachian mountain country."

== See also ==
- English-language accents in film – Welsh
