= A Voice in the Wind =

1993 novel by Francine Rivers

- First print paperback cover
- Author: Francine Rivers
- Language: English
- Publisher: Tyndale House Publishers
- Publication place: United States
- Media type: Print
- Pages: 520 pp
- ISBN: 0-8423-7750-6
- OCLC: 27684136
- Dewey Decimal: 813/.54 20
- LC Class: PS3568.I83165 V65 1993
- Followed by: An Echo in the Darkness

A Voice in the Wind (1993) is a novel by Francine Rivers, and the first book in the Mark of the Lion Series.

== Synopsis ==
The story follows the life of a young Christian-Jewish slave named Hadassah living under the Roman Empire. When Jerusalem falls to Roman forces in AD 70, Hadassah's whole family dies and she is taken to Rome as a slave. She is bought by the Valerian family to be a handmaid to their young teenage daughter, Julia. Julia is rebellious and willful, eager to grasp at all the pleasures that life has to offer. Julia initially dislikes Hadassah because of her homely appearance but comes to trust her and to rely on her gentleness and unconditional care. Hadassah is faithful and kind but afraid of many things. As the story progresses, she gains the courage to tell others about her faith in Jesus. Meanwhile, the Valerians oldest son, Marcus, is intrigued by Hadassah's innocence and unwavering faith, and begins to fall in love with her. Hadassah is equally attracted to Marcus but is worried that falling in love with him will lead her away from God because he is not a Christian. When Marcus confesses his feelings to Hadassah and asks her to marry him, she is faced with a difficult choice: stay close to God or fall for a man who will lead her away from her faith.

The story also follows Atretes, a young German tribesman who is captured by Roman soldiers and forced to fight as a gladiator. Atretes's pride and hatred for Rome fuels him in his struggle for survival in the arena, but he is gradually overcome with bitterness and despair at being forced to fight for the entertainment of the Roman mob.

A major theme of the novel is the quest for peace and meaning in the midst of the world of debauchery and pleasures that Rome has to offer. Hadassah's faith in God despite her sufferings and the impact that she has on the Valerian family is a central part of the story.
