= Redeeming Love (novel) =

1991 novel by Francine Rivers

- First edition
- Author: Francine Rivers
- Language: English
- Publisher: Bantam (first edition); Multnomah Publishers (since 1997)
- Publication date: 1991
- Publication place: United States
- Media type: Print
- Pages: 432 pp (first edition)
- ISBN: 978-0-553-29368-5 (first edition)
- OCLC: 24801369

Redeeming Love is a 1991 historical romance novel by Francine Rivers set in the 1850s Gold Rush in California. The story is inspired by the Book of Hosea from the Bible, and its central theme is the redeeming love of God towards sinners.

By 2020, the novel had sold over three million copies worldwide since its publication in 1991, and was translated into 30 languages. In 2022, the book was adapted as a film which was directed by D.J. Caruso and starred Abigail Cowen, Tom Lewis and Eric Dane.

== Plot summary ==
The story starts off in New England in 1835. Sarah, a beautiful young girl, meets her father, Alex Stafford, for the first time. Six-year-old Sarah learns that she is the product of Stafford's adulterous affair with her mother, Mae. Mae was urged to abort the child, but refused to do so, and her decision separated the two and left Mae depressed. Sarah begins to think that she is to blame, but she hopes Alex never comes back.

Later that year, Mae's maid Cleo begrudgingly takes Sarah with her on a trip to the seashore so that Mae can have a private visit with Alex. Cleo takes Sarah with her to a popular brothel where Cleo is well-known and has a male companion. After getting drunk she agrees to sleep with him while Sarah waits in the hall. After this man leaves her heartbroken again, a half-drunk Cleo tells a frightened Sarah "God's truth:" that no man ever cares for a woman and all they want is sex. Mae and Sarah then move to a shack on the docks, where Mae takes up prostitution to make ends meet. She gains a reputation known all over town, and Sarah is forced to suffer the rejection of the townspeople because of it. Through this experience, Sarah learns to mask her emotions and replace them instead with a hard exterior.

A few years later, Mae dies from a terrible illness, leaving eight year-old Sarah alone with a drunken man named Rab. Unsure of what to do with the small child, Rab seeks a home for the child. He finds a man looking for a little girl for his wealthy master. Thinking that this is Sarah's lucky break, Rab takes Sarah to the wealthy neighborhood. They are greeted at the door by a woman who urges Rab to take Sarah away and not come back. Not dissuaded, Rab insists that Sarah is perfect for this rich man. The woman admits the pair and sends them to a bedroom upstairs where they are instructed to wait until her master can see them. Duke, the master of the household, welcomes Sarah and Rab; minutes later, Rab is strangled before Sarah's eyes, his body dumped in a nearby alley. Duke, who is a pedophile, had been scouring the town not for a new daughter, but a new victim. Duke informs Sarah (renamed by him Angel) that there are many things he wants to teach her. He gives her first "lesson" that very night.

After about 10 years with Duke, Angel finally escapes and boards a ship bound for California. Along the way, she is robbed and forced to prostitute herself to avoid being raped by the mostly male passengers. She disembarks in San Francisco with nothing more than the clothes she is wearing, and is taken in by 'The Duchess', the owner of The Palace, a brothel in Pair-a-Dice. Angel becomes an exclusive, high-priced prostitute, but she is guarded constantly and her meager earnings are kept from her. Her only solace is Lucky, a fellow prostitute that is often drunk but reminds Angel of her mother.

Michael Hosea first sees Angel on a trip to Pair-A-Dice to sell produce. He is ready to leave when God tells Michael "she's the one": the woman he is meant to marry. Michael soon discovers to his shock that Angel is a prostitute. Still determined to heed God's command and marry Angel, Michael pays the high fee for her services in hopes of convincing her to leave with him, but she stubbornly rejects his offer. Discouraged, Michael questions God, but still obeys. He pays Angel's fee for three successive nights, talking and reasoning with her until his time and money are up. Angel keeps her cold, sarcastic front to dissuade him, wanting to escape the pain his words cause her, she cannot seem to escape thoughts of him and she begins hope of a life outside the Palace. After the last night with Angel, Michael grows frustrated and leaves Pair-A-Dice, but his obedience to God pushes him to return a few days later. He finds Angel almost dead from a brutal beating given her by Magowan, Duchess' bodyguard. Willing to use any means to preserve Angel's life, Michael asks her to marry him so he can take her to his cabin. Barely conscious, Angel agrees, mumbling "Why not?"

Michael nurses Angel back to health at his cabin, and she remains barely tolerant of the arrangement while it serves her needs. Michael endures Angel's harshness, remaining faithful to his new wife and God's plan. Michael's widower brother-in-law, Paul, returns home from fruitless gold panning in the Sierras, and recognizes Angel immediately as the high-priced prostitute from the Palace. Believing Angel has deceived Michael, Paul treats her badly and tries to tell Michael about Angel's profession, but this only angers him. Paul thinks Michael married Angel out of blind lust without knowing she was a prostitute, unaware that Michael knows the truth and loves her anyway. During his visit, Paul senses a rift between him and Michael, but cannot see that he is the cause.

When she finally heals from her wounds, Angel tries to run away from Michael in hopes of returning to the brothel to get back the money The Duchess had kept from her. When Paul leaves to sell the produce of his land back in Pair-A-Dice, Angel sees this as a way for her to escape. While Michael is out working in the field, she runs after Paul's wagon. He agrees to take her with him if she pays him back with her only means of currency: herself. He's disgusted by her actions even more after they have sex together and hopes that is the last he will ever see of her.

Upon her return to Pair-A-Dice, she sees that the Palace has burned down and that Lucky and another prostitute by the name of Mai Ling are dead. With nowhere else to go, she begins working above a bar—once again as a prostitute. Even though she loathes being seen as nothing but a harlot, she has no other skills with which to make a living. A livid Michael finds her in a room with a client and fights their way out of the bar filled with drunken men waiting for their turn with Angel.

They return to the cabin. Michael relies on God to work through his anger at her unfaithfulness. Angel begins to develop affectionate feelings towards Michael, which she cannot comprehend because she has never allowed herself to love any man because she still believes "God's truth". Despite her continued coldness, Michael loves her unconditionally. Upon showing her a sunrise, he says, "That is what I want to give to you." Angel feels herself softening up day by day, but in her uncertainty and fear refuses to share it with Michael. She feels a deep sense of shame at her "uncleanness": she is moved by Michael's love but cannot see herself as worthy of it. Although they have slept together regularly, Angel is very disconnected from the experience of sex, but when one night she experiences the same joy and pleasure that Michael does, it frightens her.

Michael takes Angel with him on a trip into Sacramento for supplies and fabric for new clothes. On their return to the valley, they meet the Altman family, who have a broken wheel and are stranded on the side of the road. Michael helps fix their wagon and invites them to stay at their cabin. Angel reveals to Mrs. Altman and her 16 year-old daughter Miriam that she met Michael in a brothel, and is amazed to find that they have only compassion for her instead of contempt. They become close, and Angel takes a liking to Miriam, who begins to fancy Paul, who is living at the other end of the valley. The Altman's move into their own cabin in the valley.

It is revealed in a flashback that during her time as Duke's mistress, Angel got pregnant twice, and both times an infuriated Duke had a doctor abort it. After the second abortion, the doctor takes measures to ensure that she can never get pregnant again. In the present, Angel reveals this to a devastated Michael, and tells him that she once had sex with her own father as revenge for abandoning her mother. Angel is swamped by guilt over her callous behavior and at being unable to give Michael children of his own, as she knows he longs for.

She runs away once again, this time to Sacramento; on the way she is offered a ride by an old man that sells pots. While looking for work in the city she encounters Joseph Hochschild, who has built his new store. She stays with him, knowing that he is a good friend of Michael's, and works the store with his wife and mother. When an order comes in for Michael, she tries to leave but Joseph keeps her busy, making her wait longer. When she finishes her duties and goes to close up the store, Michael is standing at the doorway, having again come back for her. She admits that she is frightened by the idea of being in love with him, but he reassures her and brings her home.

They start planting the fields. When Angel sees Miriam talking with Michael, she assumes that they have feelings for one another and jumps to the conclusion that they would make a much better couple than she and Michael. Paul wants to see Michael end up with Miriam as well, but has also begun to develop feelings for Miriam. He denies his feelings because he wishes to see Michael with Miriam instead of Angel. She then runs away once more, leaving her wedding ring behind in hopes that Michael will marry Miriam and have children with her. Michael is crushed, but says he will not go after Angel again if she does not want to be with him.

This time, Angel returns to San Francisco, getting a job with a gentle man named Virgil. He takes her in as a cook at his cafe, and takes care of her. After months of hard work, the cafe burns down and all of Angel's savings and possessions are destroyed. Observing the fire in the street, a bereft Angel hears a familiar voice: Duke greeting her. Fearing that he would hurt Virgil, who seems suspicious of Duke, Angel agrees to go back with him.

Once more under Duke's power, Angel is expected to resume her life as a prostitute. However, Duke's sexual preference is for young girls, so he asks Angel to manage his prospective "companions," but only after a week's worth of prostitution. Angel is to be presented to a crowd of men, and she begins to wrestle in her mind and cries out to God internally. She is prepared to go on stage to entertain the men, but once there, the voice of God tells her to sing and she starts singing "Rock of Ages" to the awed and confused crowd. A gray-haired man sings along with her and moves up to the front of the stage. She forgets the words of the song, and he finishes it.

After the presentation, Duke reprimands Angel. However, he is met by the singing stranger from the crowd, who threatens to have Duke hanged if he lays a single finger on Angel. With that, the man escorts Angel out, and on their way out Angel rescues two other young girls Duke was using as victims. When the men at the brothel see the two young girls with Angel, they become furious and destroy the place. The man takes them to his house, where his wife and daughter take care of them. Jonathan Axle, the man who saved her, is a wealthy and respected banker with a solid Christian family. Angel starts to attend church with the Axle family and grows fond of them.

Meanwhile, Miriam reveals that she is in love with Paul, and the two of them marry while Angel is away. Michael still awaits the return of Angel and prays continually for her to come back. Seeing his grief, Miriam insists that Paul should go and find Angel, but Paul refuses, still full of contempt for the woman he believes Angel to be. Angel eventually recognizes God's love for her and receives Christ in her heart. She begins to work with prostitutes by helping them leave their old ways and learning new abilities that might help them make a living. Susanna Axle, the daughter of Jonathan Axle, helps her run the boarding house.

Paul finally gives in to Miriam and goes to San Francisco to look for Angel. He finds her, but seeing her with Jonathan makes him think she is still a prostitute. He is furious that he came looking, and starts making up excuses to give Miriam so that he does not have to hurt her by telling her Angel is a prostitute. However, the next day he decides to go up to the house and confront Angel. At first he acts cold, contemptuous, and sarcastic, but is startled by her humility and the genuine love she harbors for Michael. He is shocked to learn that she left Michael in the hope that he would marry Miriam so that he could have children. When she discovers that Paul is married to Miriam, and that Michael is still waiting for her after three years of absence, her whole world falls apart and she no longer feels justified in staying in San Francisco.

She finally makes the decision to leave Susanna in charge of the house, and goes back to Michael. She surprises him in the field where he is working, kneeling at his feet and crying, grieved to see the profound effect losing her had on him. She reveals that her real name is "Sarah". Michael, in tears himself, receives her with kind, pure and forgiving love, and declares that he believes the revelation of her name is a promise from God that they will one day be able to have children. (Note: The Sarah in the Bible, Genesis 16 and 21, was a barren woman who, by the grace of God, was eventually able to have a son.) The two truly start a new life together, and in the epilogue, it is said that Michael and Sarah later had four children.

== Composition and publication ==
Francine Rivers had produced some earlier historical romances for a series of years before she became a born-again Christian in 1986, after an eight-year-old boy, who lived next door, invited her to church, where she changed. Following her conversion, Rivers did not write for three years, but when she stumbled across the Book of Hosea, Rivers felt compelled to write the story. The book was first published in the mainstream market by Bantam Books in 1991. Because it was released by general market publisher, the book did not hold completely explicit Christian content, such as the baptismal scene in the book and Angel's Christian conversion; however, when the book went out of print several years later, Rivers got the rights back to her book and made the additions to the novel. The novel was re-released by Multnomah Publishers in 1997.

== Reception ==
The Evangelical Christian Publishers Association awarded Redeeming Love the ECPA Gold Book award, an award that recognizes books that have sold 500,000 copies, in 2005 and the ECPA Platinum Book Award, which is presented to books that have sold one million copies, in 2009. The Spanish edition of Redeeming Love, titled Amor Redentor, was presented with a Retailers Choice Award, given by an awards program that seeks to acknowledge "the best new Christian products of the year based on the impact they have had on staff and customers", in the Spanish Category in 2009.
