= Francine Rivers =

American writer (born 1947)

- Born: 1947 (age 78–79); United States
- Education: University of Nevada, Reno (BA)
- Occupation: Novelist
- Writing career
- Period: 1976–present
- Genres: Romance, Christian fiction
- Website: www.francinerivers.com

Francine Sandra Rivers (born 1947) is an American author of fiction with Christian themes, including inspirational romance novels. Prior to becoming a born-again Christian in 1986, Rivers wrote historical romance novels. She is best known for her inspirational novel Redeeming Love, while another novel, The Last Sin Eater, received its own film adaptation released in 2007 by Fox Faith. A film based on Redeeming Love was released on January 21, 2022 through Pinnacle Peak Pictures and Universal Pictures.

== Biography ==
=== Early years ===
Francine Rivers is the daughter of a police officer and a nurse. From the time she was a child, Rivers wanted to be a published author. She attended Amador Valley High School in Pleasanton, California. She attended the University of Nevada, Reno, where she graduated with a Bachelor of Arts degree in English and journalism. After her graduation she spent time as a newspaper reporter, writing obituaries and human interest stories.

=== Career ===
After her mother-in-law lent her several romance novels, Rivers decided that she would try to write in that genre. Her first manuscript was sold and became published in 1976. For the next several years she wrote historical romance novels.

In 1986, Rivers became a born-again Christian, and for three years she had difficulty finding plots for new novels. She spent her time instead studying the Bible, and decided to adapt her writing to focus on more Christian themes. Her first novel in the new vein, Redeeming Love, was released in 1991. Rivers considers it to be her statement of faith. Redeeming Love updates the Old Testament book of Hosea to the American West of the 1850s and tells the story of a prostitute named Angel, who is eventually reformed and converted to Christianity by the stoic patience and love of a frontier farmer named Michael Hosea.

Rivers' subsequent novels have all been in the inspirational fiction genre, as Rivers wants to "illustrate Christ and the Christian walk, to address difficult problems and write realistic stories." In a letter on her webpage Francine Rivers refers to the books written before her conversion to Christianity as her "B.C." (before Christ) bibliography. She has purchased the publication rights to her earlier romance novels so that she can prevent them from being released again, but some titles have been rereleased and others circulate in used bookstores.

Her inspirational series, The Mark of the Lion, sold over half a million copies. In 2007, her novel The Last Sin Eater was made into a feature film, directed by Michael Landon Jr. and distributed by Fox Faith.

She executive produced and wrote the script for the film adaptation of her novel, Redeeming Love, which was set to debut in theaters in 2021. However, the film was delayed due to the COVID-19 pandemic and released in 2022.

=== Personal life ===
Francine Rivers is married to Rick Rivers and they live together in northern California (where the action in many of her contemporary novels is set). They have three children: Trevor, Shannon, and Travis; and five grandchildren.

== Film adaptations ==
=== The Last Sin Eater ===
In 2007, a film adaptation of The Last Sin Eater directed by Michael Landon Jr. was released by Fox Faith.

=== Redeeming Love ===
A film adaptation based on Rivers' bestselling novel Redeeming Love was announced in early 2020, with D.J. Caruso directing and Pure Flix Entertainment and Lightworkers Media producing. The film was released in 2022.

== Bibliography ==
=== Christian–inspirational romance novels ===
- Redeeming Love (1991)
- Mark of the Lion Series: (1993–1995)
  - A Voice in the Wind (1993)
  - An Echo in the Darkness (1994)
  - As Sure as the Dawn (1995)
- The Scarlet Thread (1996)
- The Atonement Child (1997)
- The Last Sin Eater (1998)
- Leota's Garden (1999)
- The Shoe Box - A Christmas novella (1999)
- Lineage of Grace Series: (2000–2001)
  - Unveiled (2000)
  - Unashamed (2000)
  - Unshaken (2001)
  - Unspoken (2001)
  - Unafraid (2001)
- And the Shofar Blew (2003)
- Sons of Encouragement Series: (2004–2007)
  - The Priest (2004)
  - The Warrior (2005)
  - The Prince (2005)
  - The Prophet (2006)
  - The Scribe (2007)
- Bible Stories for Growing Kids (2007) (Written together with daughter Shannon Rivers Coibion)
- Marta's Legacy Series: (2010)
  - Her Mother's Hope (March 2010)
  - Her Daughter's Dream (September 2010)
- Bridge to Haven (2014)
- The Masterpiece (2018)
- The Lady's Mine (2022)

=== Romance novels (B.C. bibliography) ===
- Kathleen (1979)
- Sycamore Hill (1981)
- Rebel In His Arms (1982)
- This Golden Valley (1983)
- Sarina (1983)
- Not So Wild a Dream (1985)
- Outlaw's Embrace (1986)
- A Fire in the Heart (1987)
- Second Chance at Love Series
  - Hearts Divided (1983)
  - Heart in Hiding (1984)
  - Pagan Heart (1985)

=== Study books ===
- Earth Psalms: Reflections on How God Speaks through Nature (with Karin Stock Buursma) (2016)

== Recognition ==
Year	Honor	Notes	Ref.
1986	RITA Award Golden Medallion for Historical Romance, for Not So Wild a Dream	Presented by the Romance Writers of America	
1995	RITA Award for Inspirational Romance, for An Echo in the Darkness	Presented by the Romance Writers of America	
1996	RITA Award for Inspirational Romance, for As Sure as the Dawn	Presented by the Romance Writers of America	
1997	RITA Award for Inspirational Romance, for The Scarlet Thread	Presented by the Romance Writers of America	

Rivers has been honored with many other awards, including the Christy Award, the ECPA Gold Medallion, and the Holt Medallion.

Rivers is also a member of the Romance Writers of America's Hall of Fame. Because she won three RITA Awards in a single category, Rivers was inducted into the RWA Hall of Fame, becoming one of only 16 women (as of April 2026) to have been so honored.
