= Tom Lewis (actor) =

English actor

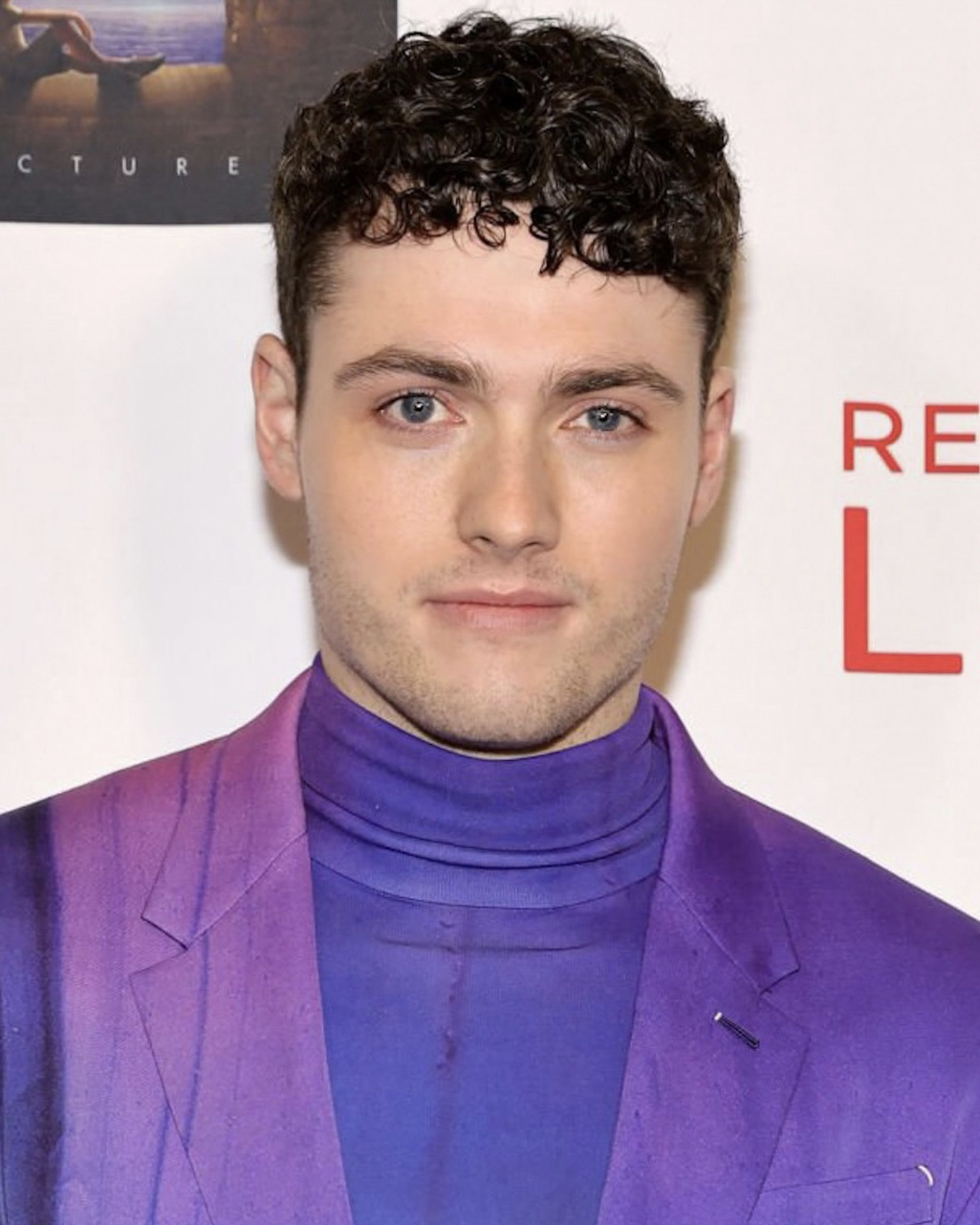
- Lewis at the Redeeming Love premiere, 2022
- Born: Leeds, England
- Education: Royal Academy of Dramatic Art
- Occupation: Actor
- Years active: 2019–present

Tom Lewis is an English actor. He is known for playing Michael in the Universal Pictures film Redeeming Love. He is also known for his roles in the HBO television series Gentleman Jack and the Channel 4 legal drama Patience.

== Early life ==
Lewis was born and grew up on a council estate in Leeds, Yorkshire. On his upbringing, Lewis said: "Luckily, my family backed my ambitions as much as they could. They said if you want to do it, then do it, we just can't help you financially." After school, he worked behind the bar at the Leeds Playhouse before Maxine Peake persuaded him to apply to RADA (Royal Academy of Dramatic Art) where he then trained for three years on a full scholarship.

Whilst still a teenager in training at RADA, Lewis graduated early when he was cast in a leading role in the historical drama series Gentleman Jack. The series was a huge success, with Lucy Mangan at The Guardian noting: "Sally Wainwright has assembled a cast with the chops to handle anything thrown at them".

== Career ==
=== Stage Roles ===
Lewis won acclaim for his stage debut at Hampstead Theatre, leading a production of The Breach directed by Sarah Frankcom, a role The Telegraph said he "perfectly captured"

In 2025, Lewis appeared in The House Party, a modern adaptation of Miss Julie for Headlong (theatre company). Writing in The Times, Holly Williams noted: "The casting is perfection. Tom plays on Jon’s class anxieties and contradictions — so tender to Christine, so scornful towards Julie, yet so drawn to her — giving shades of Paul Mescal in Normal People."

=== Screen Roles ===
After a worldwide casting search, Tom made his film debut as the lead in the romantic epic Redeeming Love alongside Abigail Cowen, which was released on 21 January 2022.

In 2025, Tom starred in the Channel 4/PBS crime drama Patience, with the series opening with rave reviews. The drama went on to be Channel 4's most viewed show of the year.

== Filmography ==
=== Film ===
Year	Title	Role
2022	Redeeming Love	Michael Hosea

=== Television ===
Year	Title	Role	Notes
2018	Shakespeare & Hathaway: Private Investigators	Dimitri	1 episode
2019–2022	Gentleman Jack	Thomas Sowden	16 episodes
2021	A Discovery of Witches	Peckham	2 episodes
2025-2026	Patience	Elliot Scott	13 episodes

=== Theatre ===
Year	Title	Role	Theatre	Director
2022	The Breach	Hoke	Hampstead Theatre	Sarah Frankcom
2025	The House Party	Jon	Headlong Theatre	Holly Race Roughan

=== Music video ===
Year	Title	Artist
2023	"Wish You the Best"	Lewis Capaldi

=== Video games ===
Year	Title	Role	Notes
2020	Assassin's Creed Valhalla	Alfred the Great	
2021	Discovery Tour: Viking Age	King Alfred	
