= The Atonement Child =

1997 novel by Francine Rivers

- First edition
- Author: Francine Rivers
- Language: English
- Genre: Christian novel
- Publisher: Tyndale House Publishers
- Publication date: 14 September 1997
- Publication place: United States
- Media type: Print (Hardback & Paperback)
- Pages: 375 pp
- ISBN: 0-8423-0041-4
- OCLC: 36074386
- Dewey Decimal: 813/.54 21
- LC Class: PS3568.I83165 A95 1997

The Atonement Child is a 1997 novel by the American author Francine Rivers. It deals with the themes of unwanted pregnancy and abortion.

== Plot introduction ==
Dynah is a young Christian girl at a Bible college when rape shatters her life. The resulting pregnancy and reactions from her family and friends may in turn shatter her faith. As her anti-abortion fiancé suddenly finds abortion acceptable, and her anti-abortion school informs her that she will be expelled unless her pregnancy disappears, she is forced to wonder about their views of the world, what God has said in the Bible, and of her own unsteady anti-abortion views. At home she finds her family torn apart as her mother admits to an abortion before she had Dynah that made her incapable of having children for several years. She also learns that her grandmother was forced to have an abortion for "health reasons". Dynah is eventually driven to isolate herself so that she can make the decision on her own. As her mother's "Atonement Child", Dynah must come to the decision on whether or not to have her own "Atonement Child".
