= Mark of the Lion =

Novel series by Francine Rivers

The Mark of the Lion series is authored by Francine Rivers and consists of three novels: A Voice in the Wind (1993), An Echo in the Darkness (1994), and As Sure as the Dawn.

== A Voice in the Wind ==
A Voice in the Wind (1993) is the first novel in Francine Rivers' Mark of the Lion series. The novel follows the lives of Hadassah, a young Jewish girl captured when the Romans destroyed Jerusalem and is sold into slavery yet still holds firm to her faith in God; Marcus, a wealthy Roman aristocrat determined to get the most out of life; Julia, Marcus' younger sister, a high-spirited girl who desires to be happy and control her own life who is served by Hadassah; and Atretes, the high chief of a Germanic tribe who is captured and sold to be a gladiator. Throughout the book, readers receive a glimpse of the extreme faith and love Hadassah has for her God, and the way it impacts the people she meets.

== An Echo in the Darkness ==
An Echo in the Darkness (1994) begins where A Voice in the Wind left off, in the arena where Hadassah is thrown to the lions. A young physician, Alexander, must choose one of the mauled bodies in the arena, so that he can examine it and further his knowledge as a physician. He chooses Hadassah's because she shows signs of life, and it is illegal to examine a dead body. He finds that the lion has struck no vital organs. On a sudden impulse, Alexander saves Hadassah and nurses her back to health. Although she remains crippled, she regains the ability to walk and talk. Meanwhile, Marcus, believing that Hadassah is dead, tries to deal with his grief by travelling to Israel (Hadassah's homeland) and learning about Hadassah's God.

== As Sure as the Dawn ==
As Sure as the Dawn (1995) is rather a split of A Voice in the Wind than a follow-up of An Echo in the Darkness following the life of Atretes after he won his freedom in the arena. This novel covers the search for his believed dead son, finding him with a widowed Christian woman, Rizpah, and their travels back to Atretes' homeland in Germania. Here a whole new world unfolds as Atretes is confronted with Christianity, loyalty, love, friendship, family and tradition.
