= Robert Farrar Capon =

American food writer and priest

Portrait of Capon as printed on the back cover of Exit 36: A Fictional Chronicle

Robert Farrar Capon (October 26, 1925 – September 5, 2013) was an American Episcopal priest, author and chef.

He was born in Jackson Heights, Queens in 1925 and graduated from Columbia College in 1946 and Columbia Graduate School of Arts and Sciences in 1947. A lifelong New Yorker, for almost thirty years Capon was a full-time parish priest in Port Jefferson, New York. In 1965, he published his first book, Bed and Board.

In 1977 the 51 year-old Capon was relieved of his parish duties after he revealed his intent to divorce his wife and remarry. He left the full-time ministry and devoted more time to his writing career. He authored a total of twenty books, including Between Noon and Three, The Supper of the Lamb, Genesis: The Movie, and a trilogy on Jesus' parables: The Parables of Grace, The Parables of the Kingdom, and The Parables of Judgment.

Capon described himself, in the introduction to The Romance of the Word (1995), as an "old-fashioned high churchman and a Thomist to boot." One of Capon's primary themes is the radical grace of God. Capon summarizes his broad view of salvation as follows:

I am and I am not a universalist. I am one if you are talking about what God in Christ has done to save the world. The Lamb of God has not taken away the sins of some—of only the good, or the cooperative, or the select few who can manage to get their act together and die as perfect peaches. He has taken away the sins of the world—of every last being in it—and he has dropped them down the black hole of Jesus' death. On the cross, he has shut up forever on the subject of guilt: "There is therefore now no condemnation. . . ." All human beings, at all times and places, are home free whether they know it or not, feel it or not, believe it or not. But I am not a universalist if you are talking about what people may do about accepting that happy-go-lucky gift of God's grace. I take with utter seriousness everything that Jesus had to say about hell, including the eternal torment that such a foolish non-acceptance of his already-given acceptance must entail. All theologians who hold Scripture to be the Word of God must inevitably include in their work a tractate on hell. But I will not—because Jesus did not—locate hell outside the realm of grace. Grace is forever sovereign, even in Jesus' parables of judgment. No one is ever kicked out at the end of those parables who wasn't included in at the beginning.

In the 1990s Capon served as assisting priest at St. Luke's Church in East Hampton, New York, and was the Canon Theologian to the Episcopal Bishop of Long Island. He lived with his wife Valerie in Shelter Island, New York as of 2004.

Capon also had a lifelong interest in food and cooking, and authored several cookbooks. He was a food columnist for Newsday and The New York Times, and taught cooking classes.

Robert Capon died on September 5, 2013, in Greenport, New York. He was survived by his second wife Valerie and his eight children.

== Bibliography ==
- Light Theology and Heavy Cream: The Culinary Adventures of Pietro and Madeline (Cowley, 2004) ISBN 9781561012664
- Genesis, The Movie (Eerdmans, 2003) ISBN 9780802860941
- Kingdom, Grace, Judgment: Paradox, Outrage, and Vindication in the Parables of Jesus (Eerdmans, 2002) ISBN 9780802839497
- The Fingerprints of God: Tracking the Divine Suspect Through a History of Image (Eerdmans, 2000) ISBN 9780802847683
- The Foolishness of Preaching: Proclaiming the Gospel Against the Wisdom of the World (Eerdmans, 1997) ISBN 9780802843050
- Between Noon and Three: Romance, Law, and the Outrage of Grace (Eerdmans, 1997) ISBN 9780802842220
- The Astonished Heart: Lost and Found in the History of the Church (Eerdmans, 1996) ISBN 9780802807915
- The Romance of the Word: One Man's Love Affair with Theology (Eerdmans, 1995) ISBN 9780802840844
- Health, Money, and Love ... And Why We Don't Enjoy Them (Eerdmans, 1990) ISBN 9780802836571
- The Mystery of Christ ... and Why We Don't Get It (Eerdmans, 1993) ISBN 9780802801210
- The Man Who Met God in a Bar: The Gospel According to Marvin : A Novel (1990)
- The Parables of Judgment (Eerdmans, 1989) ISBN 9780802804914
- The Parables of Grace (Eerdmans, 1988) ISBN 9780802803047
- The Third Peacock: The Problem of God and Evil (1971)
- The Parables of the Kingdom (1985)
- Capon on Cooking (1983)
- The Youngest Day: Shelter Island's Seasons in the Light of Grace (1983)
- (foreword) Good Food from a Japanese Temple: a 600-year Tradition of Simple, Elegant Vegetable Cookery (1982) ISBN 9780870115271
- A Second Day: Reflections on Remarriage (1980)
- Party Spirit: Some Entertaining Principles (1979)
- Food for Thought: Resurrecting the Art of Eating (1978)
- Hunting the Divine Fox: Images and Mystery in Christian Faith (1974)
- Exit 36: A Fictional Chronicle (1975)
- The Supper of the Lamb: A Culinary Reflection (1969)
- An Offering of Uncles: The Priesthood of Adam and the Shape of the World (1967)
- Bed and Board: Plain Talk About Marriage (1965)
