= Montdurausse =

- Commune
- Coat of arms
- Location of Montdurausse
- Location within France Location within Occitanie
- Coordinates: 43°56′55″N 1°34′12″E
- Country: France
- Region: Occitania
- Department: Tarn
- Arrondissement: Albi
- Canton: Vignobles et Bastides
- Intercommunality: CA Gaillac-Graulhet

Government
  - Mayor (2020–2026): Michel Malgouyres
- Area^{1}: 15.92 km^{2} (6.15 sq mi)
- Elevation: 220 m (720 ft)
- Highest elevation: 226 m (741 ft)
- Lowest elevation: 134 m (440 ft)
- Population (2023): 396
  - Density: 24.9/km^{2} (64.4/sq mi)
- Time zone: UTC+01:00 (CET)
  - Summer (DST): UTC+02:00 (CEST)
- INSEE/Postal code: 81175 /81630
- ^{1} French Land Register data, which excludes lakes, ponds, glaciers > 1 km^{2} (0.386 sq mi or 247 acres) and river estuaries.

Montdurausse (French pronunciation: [mɔ̃dyʁos]; Occitan: Montdurauça) is a commune in the southern French department of Tarn.

== See also ==
- Communes of the Tarn department
