= Redeeming Love (2022 film) =

2022 American film by D. J. Caruso

- Theatrical release poster
- Directed by: D.J. Caruso
- Written by: Francine Rivers; D. J. Caruso
- Story by: Francine Rivers
- Based on: Redeeming Love by Francine Rivers
- Produced by: Cindy Bond; Brittany Yost; Simon Swart; Wayne Fitzjohn; Michael Scott
- Starring: Abigail Cowen; Tom Lewis; Logan Marshall-Green; Wu Kexi; Famke Janssen; Nina Dobrev; Eric Dane
- Cinematography: Rogier Stoffers
- Edited by: Jim Page
- Music by: Brian Tyler; Breton Vivian
- Production companies: Nthibah Pictures; Pinnacle Peak Pictures; Mission Pictures International
- Distributed by: Universal Pictures
- Release date: January 21, 2022
- Running time: 134 minutes
- Country: United States
- Language: English
- Budget: $30 million
- Box office: $9.4 million

Redeeming Love is a 2022 American Christian Western romance film directed by D.J. Caruso, who co-wrote the screenplay with Francine Rivers. The film is based on Rivers' 1991 novel of the same name, which was based on the Biblical story of Hosea, and is set in the American Old West during the California Gold Rush. It stars Abigail Cowen, Tom Lewis and Logan Marshall-Green.

The film was co-produced by Pinnacle Peak Pictures, Mission Pictures International, and Nthibah Pictures, and was filmed in Cape Town, South Africa. It was theatrically released by Universal Pictures on January 21, 2022, and received generally negative reviews from critics but was well-received by audiences. Redeeming Love was nominated for the GMA Dove Award for Inspirational Film/Series of the Year at the 2022 GMA Dove Awards.

== Plot ==
During the California Gold Rush, a beautiful young woman called Angel works as a prostitute in the mining town Pair-a-Dice. Despite being coveted by the local men, she survives through hatred and self-loathing. Farmer Michael Hosea, after praying for a wife, falls in love with Angel at first sight.

The brothel's bodyguard MacGowen and the madam Duchess frequently abuse Angel. In flashbacks, her name is revealed to be Sarah, and she has suffered abuse and neglect from men all her life. Upon meeting her father Alex Stafford, he declared she should never have been born, as her mother Mae was his mistress. He cuts off support, so Mae sells everything, then pawn broker John gives her money for sex, making her a prostitute. Eventually she falls ill and dies. Distraught, Sarah rejects her mother's faith. John sells her to pimp Duke, who renames her "Angel", then has him killed.

Years later, the teenage Angel meets and seduces Alex. Upon finding out he had sex with his own daughter, Alex commits suicide. Prostitute Sally, who helps Angel escape from Duke, is later killed. Angel travels to California to start over but is immediately robbed. Penniless, she returns to prostitution.

In the present, Michael enters Angel's room, declaring he wants to marry her. Although surprised, she remains aloof. His frequent visits motivate Angel to demand her money from Duchess to leave. Not wanting to lose her, she insists she owes her money. MacGowen then nearly kills her.

Rushing to the brothel, Michael sees Angel's wounds, pays off her debt and proposes again. She accepts, so he takes her home. Michael nurses Angel back to health, despite her coldness. He continually surprises her, declaring he loves her as his wife, yet will not lay with her. Afraid to trust him, she soon runs away, but Michael coaxes her back.

As Angel and Michael begin their life on the farm, she develops feelings for him, so they finally consummate their marriage. Michael's late sister Tess's widower Paul arrives, immediately distrusting Angel. She flees upon realizing Michael wants children, as she believes a forced abortion made her sterile. Paul gives Angel a ride for in exchange for sex. Angel is disgusted afterwards and becomes ill.

Back in Pair-A-Dice, Angel returns to the brothel to collect her money. However, MacGowan burned it down with Duchess inside, then an angry mob killed him. With no money nor place to live, Angel reluctantly prostitutes herself through a bar. She gratefully returns home upon Michael's arrival.

Michael and Angel's relationship blossoms, based on honesty and affection. Angel falls in love with Michael completely, genuinely wanting to stay. They help a woman in labor, then take in her whole family. Believing the oldest daughter Miriam is much better suited for Michael, as she is not barren, Angel has sex with Michael one last time, then disappears the next day. She leaves Miriam her wedding ring with a note, asking her to take care of Michael. He decides not to chase after Angel, as he respects her right to choose and feels she must return on her own.

Now able to cook, Angel gets a job at a cafe rather than returning to prostitution. However, on her first day, the hotel is burnt down by the recently arrived Duke. He forces Angel back into prostitution to spare her boss's life. However, discovering that he still forces young girls into prostitution, Angel confronts him. Duke silences her upon threat of death.

Duke places Angel on his new establishment's stage. With regained faith, she reveals Duke's trafficking of young girls to the audience. Denying the allegations, he attempts to murder Angel, but a man subdues him so she can free the girls. An outraged mob lynches Duke. Afterward, Angel dedicates herself to helping rehabilitate young girls.

Three years later, Paul finds Angel running a school for girls. Angel assumes Michael has married Miriam, but Paul reveals he married Miriam. Angel accuses him of coming between Michael and Miriam, but he insists Miriam has never been in love with Michael. Paul informs Angel that Michael is still waiting for her. Paul tearfully apologizes, but she has long forgiven him.

Angel returns home, finally revealing to Michael that her name is Sarah. She tells him she never told anyone before, as it was the only thing she had that no one could take from her. Michael welcomes her home with a tender embrace, returning her wedding ring. Years later, he and a pregnant Angel are shown fishing with their young son.

== Cast ==
- Abigail Cowen as Angel/Sarah
- Tom Lewis as Michael Hosea
- Logan Marshall-Green as Paul
- Wu Kexi as Mai Ling
- Livi Birch as Sarah Stafford
- Famke Janssen as Duchess
- Nina Dobrev as Mae
- Eric Dane as Duke
- Daniah De Villiers as Miriam

== Production ==
The film was shot in Cape Town, South Africa, in February 2020. The film itself was announced in April 2020, with D.J. Caruso directing and Roma Downey and Francine Rivers executive producing. Rivers also wrote the script, along with Caruso. Redeeming Love marks the second collaboration between producers Cindy Bond and Simon Swart, the first being 2018's I Can Only Imagine. Wayne Fitzjohn, Michael Scott, and Brittany Yost also produce.

== Release ==
Redeeming Love was originally scheduled to be released in spring 2021. However, it was delayed due to the COVID-19 pandemic. The film was released in theaters on January 21, 2022, in the United States and Canada.

The film was released for VOD platforms on February 8, 2022, followed by a Blu-ray and DVD release on March 8, 2022. It was available for streaming on Peacock beginning March 10, 2022.

== Reception ==
=== Box office ===
Universal Pictures put the film into wide release, in 1,963 theaters, on January 21, 2022. Projected to gross less than $5 million domestically in its first three days, it earned $3.5 million in its opening weekend, finishing fourth at the box office. The film dropped out of the box office top ten in its fourth weekend, finishing twelfth with $354,835. The film was a box office bomb, taking in $9.46 million worldwide, against a budget of $30 million.

=== Critical response ===
On the review aggregator website Rotten Tomatoes, 11% of 28 critics' reviews are positive, with an average rating of 4/10. On Metacritic, the film has a score of 32% based on reviews from 7 critics, indicating "generally unfavorable reviews". Audiences polled by CinemaScore gave the film an average grade of "B+" on an A+ to F scale.

Mike McCahill of The Guardian gave the film 2/5 stars, saying it "thinly scatters a parable's worth of plot across 134 minutes and resembles HBO's Deadwood recut for Sunday-school purposes: pious, puzzling and punitive, with a sternly wagging finger never far from entering the frame." RogerEbert.com's Nell Minow gave it 2/4 stars, writing, "The biggest problem is that the most touching moments are hammered so hard. Redeeming Love could have tried to reach a broader audience but settles for preaching to the choir." The A.V. Club's A. A. Dowd criticized the love story as "icky", saying it "hinges on a fundamental power imbalance: Angel literally can't say no to Michael's evening visits... and when she finally does accept his proposal, it's while lying bruised and battered after one of her employer's thugs beats her within an inch of her life." He gave the film a grade of D+.

The Mercury News's Randy Myers gave it a score of 2.5/4, writing, "Love might be best embraced by the faithful, but it is well made and has much to say about the healing power of love and how we all deserve second chances."
