= New Living Translation =

English translation of the Bible

- Abbreviation: NLT (Note: The NLT was sometimes abbreviated as the NLTse (New Living Translation, Second Edition) after a major text revision in 2004. This branding was retired by the time of the 2013 text revision.)
- Complete Bible published: 1996
- Textual basis: OT: Biblia Hebraica Stuttgartensia (1977); additional sources in difficult cases; NT: UBS Greek New Testament (4th corrected ed.); Novum Testamentum Graece (27th ed., 1993); additional sources
- Translation type: Dynamic equivalence
- Reading level: 6.0
- Revision: 2004, 2007, 2013, 2015
- Publisher: Tyndale House Foundation
- Copyright: Holy Bible, New Living Translation, copyright © 1996, 2004, 2015 by Tyndale House Foundation. All rights reserved.
- Religious affiliation: Evangelical
- Webpage: www.tyndale.com/nlt/
- Genesis 1:1–3 In the beginning God created the heavens and the earth. The earth was formless and empty, and darkness covered the deep waters. And the Spirit of God was hovering over the surface of the waters. Then God said, "Let there be light," and there was light. John 3:16 For this is how God loved the world: He gave his one and only Son, so that everyone who believes in him will not perish but have eternal life.

The New Living Translation (NLT) is a paraphrase-style translation of the Bible in contemporary English. Published in 1996 by Tyndale House Foundation, the NLT was created "by 90 leading Bible scholars." The NLT relies on recently published critical editions of the original Hebrew, Aramaic, and Greek texts.

The origin of the NLT came from a project aiming to revise The Living Bible (TLB). This effort eventually led to the creation of the NLT—a new translation separate from the LB. The first NLT edition retains some text of the LB, but these are less evident in text revisions that have been published since.

== Translation philosophy ==
The New Living Translation used translators from a variety of Christian denominations. The method combined an attempt to translate the original texts simply and literally with a dynamic equivalence synergy approach used to convey the thoughts behind the text where a literal translation may have been difficult to understand or even misleading to modern readers. A part of the reasoning behind adapting the language for accessibility is the premise that more people will hear the Bible read aloud in a church service than are likely to read it or study it on their own.

Most biblical scholars agree this "thought-for-thought" methodology, while making the translation easier to understand, is less accurate than a literal (formal equivalence) method, and thus the New Living Translation may not be suitable for those wishing to undertake detailed study of the Bible.

== Textual basis ==
The Old Testament translation was based on the Masoretic Text (Biblia Hebraica Stuttgartensia) and was further compared to other sources such as the Dead Sea Scrolls, Septuagint, Greek manuscripts, Samaritan Pentateuch, Syriac Peshitta, and Latin Vulgate. The New Testament translation was based on the two standard editions of the Greek New Testament (the UBS 4th revised edition and the Nestle-Åland Novum Testamentum Graece 27th edition).

== Translation history ==
Former logo

Work on this revision began in 1989 with ninety translators; it was published in July 1996, 25 years after the publication of The Living Bible. Advanced reader copies of the Epistle to the Romans were originally printed as the New Living Version, but eventually renamed the New Living Translation to avoid confusion between this new work and The Living Bible. NLV is still used to identify the New Living Translation in ONIX for Books. Soon after that, a new revision was begun and The Second Edition of the NLT (also called the NLTse) was released in 2004. A revision in 2007 comprised mostly minor textual or footnote changes. Other revisions were released in 2013 and 2015 with minor changes throughout.

In 2016, Tyndale House Publishers, the Conference of Catholic Bishops of India Commission for Bible, ATC Publishers Bengaluru, and twelve Biblical scholars collaborated to prepare a New Living Translation Catholic Edition. After reviewing the changes introduced in the Catholic edition, Tyndale subsequently approved and adopted the Indian Bishops' edits into the main body of the 2015 edition, where they appear in all subsequent editions, Protestant and Catholic alike.

== Translation properties ==
The New Living Translation is (according to its publisher) intended to be easily accessible to readers of modern English, at the expense of losing some accuracy to the original text. As part of this effort:

- Weights and measures, money, dates and times, etc., are described in modern terms, with footnotes giving the literal translation. For example, John 6:7 reads: "Philip replied, 'Even if we worked for months, we wouldn't have enough money to feed them'", with a note that the Greek text reads "Two hundred denarii would not be enough" and an explanation that a denarius was equivalent to a laborer's full day's wage.
- Some phrases are translated into contemporary English; e.g. "they beat their breasts" (Luke 23:48) is translated as "They went home in deep sorrow", again with footnotes providing more literal interpretations.
- Gender-inclusive language is used where the editors believed that it was appropriate, thus ἀδελφοί (adelphoi) is translated "brothers and sisters".

== Circulation ==
In July 2008, the NLT gained the No. 1 spot in unit sales, unseating the NIV for the first time in over two decades. According to the Christian Booksellers Association (as of March 2014), the NLT is the second most popular Bible translation based on unit sales, and the fourth most popular based on sales numbers.

A Roman Catholic edition of the NLT with the Deuterocanon was published by ATC Publications in Bangalore, India. The NLT Catholic Edition (NLTCE) was granted an imprimatur by Oswald Cardinal Gracias, Archbishop of Bombay and President of the Council of Catholic Bishops of India. It was later released in North America as the Catholic Holy Bible Reader's Edition on October 17, 2017. Although the imprimatur does not extend to use of the NLTCE in the liturgy, it has been officially approved by the Catholic Church for private study and devotional use.

The NLT is available in numerous editions as well as numerous study Bible editions, including: The Life Application Study Bible, The Life Recovery Bible, The NLT Study Bible, and the NLT Illustrated Study Bible. The Cornerstone Biblical Commentary series uses the second-edition NLT text as its base. In June 2017, the Africa Study Bible, edited by Africa International University dean John Jusu, was offered to African English readers.

== See also ==
- Modern English Bible translations
