= Gospel (novel) =

1993 novel by Wilton Barnhardt

- Author: Wilton Barnhardt
- Language: English
- Publication date: 1993

Gospel (ISBN 0312119240, St. Martin's Press) is a 1993 novel by Wilton Barnhardt focusing on the composition and discovery of a (fictional) noncanonical gospel. The author travelled extensively in Europe, the Middle East and Africa while researching it. Unusually, his acknowledgements contain not only expressions of gratitude, but also a faux-anathema against the credit-card company which cancelled his card while he was travelling in the Sudan.

== Plot summary ==
The book contains two interwoven plots: the story of the gospel's author, set in the first century AD (who narrates his adventures in the form of the gospel itself); and a contemporary story surrounding Lucy Danton, a somewhat naive Roman Catholic seminary student, and Patrick O'Hanrahan, her maverick Jesuit professor, who together set out to recover that gospel.

The gospel's author is revealed to be Matthias, whom the Book of Acts describes as Judas's replacement. The fictional Gospel of Matthias's descriptions of first-century Christianity are not always edifying, but often wittily call to mind contemporary religious movements. The fictional gospel revolves around whether, after his crucifixion, Jesus's body was smuggled to Egypt and mummified. However, the question remains unanswered in the end.

== Bibliography ==
- Laughlin, Rosemary (1996). "Beyond the Dead Sea Scrolls." The English Journal. 85(7), 137-138.
- Walsh, Thomas (1995). "The Gospel According to Novelists." Washington Times. June 11.
