= Trailblazer Books =

Series of historical fiction children's novels

- Author: Dave and Neta Jackson
- Language: English
- Genre: Action, historical fiction, children's literature
- Publisher: Bethany House
- Published: 1991–2003
- No. of books: 40
- Website: trailblazerbooks.com

Trailblazer Books are a series of middle-grade historical fiction children's novels about Christian figures authored by Dave and Neta Jackson. Published between 1991 and 2003, the 40 books in the series each feature a young person—sometimes an actual historical figure and sometimes a fictional character—who interacts with a notable Protestant religious leader, missionary, or social reformer. By 2000, the series had sold more than 1.7 million copies.

== Books ==
According to the authors, Trailblazer Books were intended to be fun, build Christian character, teach world and church history and geography, inspire service and modern missions, "show God using both men and women," and "break down racial prejudice." In addition to English, books in the series have been translated into German, Norwegian, Korean, Spanish and Swedish. The books were written at a junior high level in an action-adventure style with a particular focus on engaging boys in reading.

According to Festival Quarterly, "[e]ach book finds the youthful main character encountering a hero of the faith—men and women such as David Livingstone, Amy Carmichael, Harriet Tubman, and Menno Simons. During their research on the historical characters, the Jacksons looked for evidence of a real person—young boy or girl—who could become the main character of their book. For example, the main character of the David Livingstone book—Escape from the Slave Traders—is one of the actual slaves rescued by Livingstone. Whenever they could not find an actual person, they created a fictional young person, typical of someone who might have lived in the time period. For example, the main character of the John Wesley book—The Chimney Sweep’s Ransom—is a young member of a coal-mining family in northern England."

Title	Historical figure	Year published	ISBN
Kidnapped by River Rats	William Booth and Catherine Booth	1991	ISBN 9781939445032
The Queen's Smuggler	William Tyndale	1991	ISBN 9781556612213
Spy for the Night Riders	Martin Luther	1992	ISBN 9781556612374
The Hidden Jewel	Amy Carmichael	1992	ISBN 9781556612459
Escape from the Slave Traders	David Livingstone	1992	ISBN 9781939445070
The Chimney Sweep's Ransom	John Wesley	1992	ISBN 9781556612688
The Bandit of Ashley Downs	George Müller	1992	ISBN 9781939445094
Imprisoned in the Golden City	Adoniram Judson and Ann Hasseltine Judson	1993	ISBN 9781556612695
Shanghaied to China	Hudson Taylor	1993	ISBN 9781556612718
Listen for the Whippoorwill	Harriet Tubman	1993	ISBN 9781556612725
Attack in the Rye Grass	Marcus Whitman and Narcissa Whitman	1994	ISBN 9781417607792
Trial by Poison	Mary Slessor	1994	ISBN 9781556612749
Flight of the Fugitives	Gladys Aylward	1992	ISBN 9781556614668
The Betrayer's Fortune	Menno Simons	1994	ISBN 9781939445162
Abandoned on the Wild Frontier	Peter Cartwright	1995	ISBN 9781556614682
Danger on the Flying Trapeze	Dwight L. Moody	1992	ISBN 9781939445186
The Runaway's Revenge	John Newton	1995	ISBN 9781556614712
The Thieves of Tyburn Square	Elizabeth Fry	1995	ISBN 9781939445209
Quest for the Lost Prince	Samuel Morris	1996	ISBN 9781556614729
The Warrior's Challenge	David Zeisberger	1996	ISBN 9781939445223
The Drummer Boy's Battle	Florence Nightingale	1997	ISBN 9781417607815
Traitor in the Tower	John Bunyan	1997	ISBN 9781939445247
Defeat of the Ghost Riders	Mary McLeod Bethune	1997	ISBN 9781556617423
The Fate of the Yellow Woodbee	Nate Saint	1997	ISBN 9781417607839
The Gold Miners' Rescue	Sheldon Jackson	1998	ISBN 9781939445278
The Mayflower Secret	William Bradford	1998	ISBN 9781939445285
Assassins in the Cathedral	Festo Kivengere	1999	ISBN 9780764220128
Mask of the Wolf Boy	Jonathan Goforth and Rosalind Goforth	1999	ISBN 9780764220111
Race for the Record	Joy Ridderhof	1999	ISBN 9780764220135
Ambushed in Jaguar Swamp	W. Barbrooke Grubb	1999	ISBN 9780764220142
The Forty-Acre Swindle	George Washington Carver	2000	ISBN 9780764222641
Hostage on the Nighthawk	William Penn	2000	ISBN 9780613939911
Journey to the End of the Earth	William J. Seymour	2000	ISBN 9781939445353
Drawn By a China Moon	Lottie Moon	2000	ISBN 9781939445360
Sinking the Dayspring	John Gibson Paton	2001	ISBN 9780613829199
Roundup of the Street Rovers	Charles Loring Brace	2001	ISBN 9780764222696
Risking the Forbidden Game	Maude Cary	2002	ISBN 9780764222344
Blinded by the Shining Path	Rómulo Sauñe	2002	ISBN 9780613929356
Exiled to the Red River	Spokane Garry	2003	ISBN 9780613940009
Caught in the Rebel Camp	Frederick Douglass	2003	ISBN 9780998210704

== Reception and awards ==
The Christian Booksellers Association awarded the series its Best Children's Book of the Year award in 1995. The series was also recognized with the C.S. Lewis Award for best series from Christian School Children and the Best Children's Book from Christian Booksellers New Zealand. Several books in the series have won individual awards. Listen to the Whippoorwill and Attack in the Rye Grass won the Silver Angel Award from Excellence in Media in 1994 and 1995, respectively. The Trailblazer books on Festo Kivengere and Rómulo Sauñe were recommended as reading on persecution of Christians by Christian History magazine.

== Adaptation ==
In 2007, the newly formed Hunt Entertainment Group, which intended to produce family-friendly entertainment optioned up to three books in the series for film production.
