= The Living Bible =

English biblical paraphrase (1971)

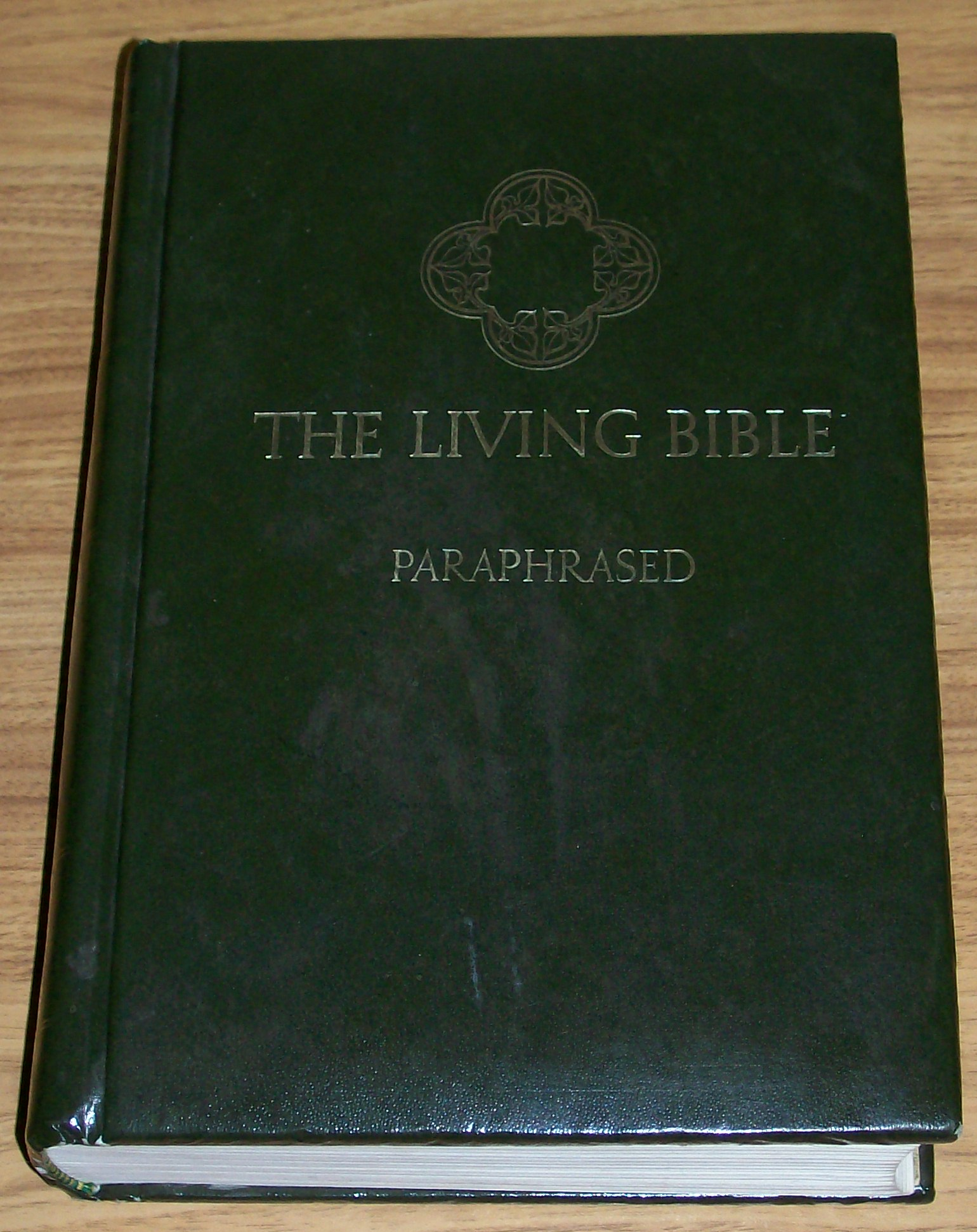
- Full name: The Living Bible
- Abbreviation: TLB
- Complete Bible published: 1971; 55 years ago
- Textual basis: Paraphrase of American Standard Version, 1901, with comparisons of other translations, including the King James Version, and some Greek texts.
- Translation type: Paraphrase.
- Copyright: Copyright 1971 Tyndale House Publishers
- Genesis 1:1–3 When God began creating the heavens and the earth, the earth was at first a shapeless, chaotic mass, with the Spirit of God brooding over the dark vapors. Then God said, "Let there be light". And light appeared. John 3:16 For God loved the world so much that He gave his only Son so that anyone who believes in him shall not perish but have eternal life.

The Living Bible (TLB or LB) is a personal paraphrase, not a translation, of the Bible in English by Kenneth N. Taylor and first published in 1971. Taylor used the American Standard Version of 1901 as his base text.

"The Way", an illustrated edition, was published shortly thereafter, in 1972. It additionally included short devotional passages.

== Origin ==
In a 1979 interview by Harold Myra in an issue of Christianity Today, Taylor explained the inspiration for preparing The Living Bible:

The children were one of the chief inspirations for producing the Living Bible. Our family devotions were tough going because of the difficulty we had understanding the King James Version, which we were then using, or the Revised Standard Version, which we used later. All too often I would ask questions to be sure the children understood, and they would shrug their shoulders—they didn't know what the passage was talking about. So I would explain it. I would paraphrase it for them and give them the thought. It suddenly occurred to me one afternoon that I should write out the reading for that evening thought by thought, rather than doing it on the spot during our devotional time. So I did, and read the chapter to the family that evening with exciting results—they knew the answers to all the questions I asked!

== Reception ==
The Living Bible was well received in many Evangelical circles. Youth-oriented Protestant groups such as Youth for Christ and Young Life accepted it readily. In 1962 Billy Graham received a copy of Living Letters – a paraphrase of the New Testament epistles and the first portion of what later became The Living Bible – while recuperating in a hospital in Hawaii. He was impressed with its easy readability, and he asked for permission to print 50,000 paperback copies of Living Letters for use in his evangelistic crusades. Over the next year he distributed 600,000 copies of Living Letters.

There is also The Catholic Living Bible, which only has an imprimatur and nihil obstat on the deuterocanonical text which are deuterocanonical books listed after Revelation. The Catholic Living Bible does not use the word "paraphrased" on the front cover; but earlier editions may instead place the word on the title page, underneath which is written "A Thought-For-Thought Translation". The added words "A Thought-For-Thought Translation" in the subtitle of the title page are not unique to Catholic editions, they are also in the later printings of the Protestant editions, even though the Bible is a paraphrase. (Note: Another edition with this subtitle is the Executive Heritage Slimline Edition. There is also a Giant Print Edition with that subtitle on the title page. Like some Catholic editions, that edition does not include the word "paraphrased" on the front cover.)

The Living Bible was a best-seller in the early 1970s, largely due to the accessibility of its modern language, which made passages understandable to those with weak reading skills, or no previous background in Bible study. The Living Bible was the best-selling book in the U.S. in 1972 and 1973.

From the very beginning of its publication, Taylor had assigned the copyright to Tyndale House Foundation, so all of the royalties from sales of The Living Bible were given to charity.

== Criticism ==
Reformed writer Michael Marlowe criticized the edition, saying that it was "the dumbing-down of the Biblical text to a grade-school level" done "in keeping with the linguistic and educational trends of the time." Marlowe further accused Taylor of "wrest[ing] the scripture so as to conform it to Arminian teachings about salvation."

Rev. Dr. Raymond Brown noted that there were questionable paraphrases, such as the first verse of the Gospel of John, which Taylor paraphrases as "In the beginning was Christ" from a literal translation of the original Greek which is "In the beginning was the Word."

Writing a review of The Book, a 1980s version of The Living Bible, Biblical scholar Eldon J. Epp said that the translation was at times anti-semitic and overly anachronistic.

== Textual characteristics ==
The Living Bible uses modern language, which made passages understandable to those with weak reading skills, or no previous background in Bible study, and lingual contractions such as "don't" for "do not".

In the late 1980s, Taylor and his colleagues at Tyndale House Publishers invited a team of 90 Greek and Hebrew scholars to participate in a project of revising the text of The Living Bible. After many years of work, the result was an entirely new translation of the Bible. It was published in 1996 as the Holy Bible: New Living Translation (NLT).

== Notable passages ==
At 1 Samuel 24:3, The Living Bible has "Saul went into the cave to go to the bathroom", using a contemporary North American euphemism where the original Hebrew (also a euphemism) literally translates as "to cover his feet". In the British edition of The Living Bible, this wording was changed to "to relieve himself", which is also found in most other non-literal English translations.
