= The Monkey Bible =

2010 novel by Mark Laxer

- Author: Mark Laxer
- Language: English
- Publisher: Outer Rim Press, LLC
- Publication date: August 25, 2010
- Publication place: United States
- Media type: Print (hardback & paperback)
- Pages: 304
- ISBN: 0-9638108-0-4 (first edition, hardback)

The Monkey Bible: A Modern Allegory is a 2010 novel written by author Mark Laxer. The Monkey Bible tells the story of character Emmanuel, a deeply religious man who discovers he may not be completely human.

== Overview ==
Emmanuel begins a journey around the world to find answers to questions on genetics and religion after fearing he may no longer be accepted into Heaven. A close friend travels with him while working on rewriting Genesis from a biologically inclusive view, hoping to prove that Emmanuel still has a place in Heaven. Each copy is printed on recycled paper using soy ink.

=== Themes ===
The novel opens discussions on creation vs evolution, genetic make-up, religion, biology, anthropology, and wildlife conservation. The science behind Laxer’s work of fiction is intended to be accurate and current.

Ultimately, the novel explores the scientific and mythological line which separates humans from non-human animals and science from religion. It explores the need in humans for creation myths and for storytelling, as well as what it means to be human and an exploration of our hierarchical social structures. It is a plea to slightly alter the stories by which humans define themselves in order to protect life and the human species from extinction.

== The Monkey Bible Project ==
The Monkey Bible novel is part of the overall Monkey Bible Project. Each book sold includes The Line, a musical album by singer/songwriter Eric Maring. After Laxer shared an early draft with Maring, Maring was inspired to write an accompanying acoustic rock musical. Laxer subsequently rewrote parts of the novel based on The Line'.

The Monkey Bible Project includes a multimedia staged theatrical performance called The Monkey Bible Show, YouTube videos, and live virtual ecotours (vEcotourism) from around the world using a technology invented by the novel’s protagonist, the Teaching Evolution Project. It also includes a story featuring interviews with various Americans about how people think they came to be.

== Author background ==
Author Mark Laxer’s quest to understand the bigger world landed him in the inner circle of a charismatic guru. After writing Take Me For A Ride: coming of age in a destructive cult in 1994, Laxer continued the quest by writing The Monkey Bible. He also runs a software corporation, a storytelling gathering, and a wildlife conservation organization.

Songwriter Eric Maring has performed as far away as a festival for the Dalai Lama in India and at schools and coffeehouses in his hometown of Washington, D.C. He's also studied tabla in India, flamenco guitar in Spain, and music artistry and composition with the legendary Pierre Bensusan in France. The Line is his fifth musical release.
