= Wilton Barnhardt =

American writer

Wilton Barnhardt (born 1960) is a former reporter for Sports Illustrated and is the author of Emma Who Saved My Life (1989), Gospel (1993), Show World (1999), and Lookaway, Lookaway (2013).

Barnhardt took his B.A. at Michigan State University, and was a graduate student at Brasenose College, University of Oxford, where he read for an M.Phil. in English. He teaches fiction-writing to undergraduate and graduate students at the North Carolina State University in Raleigh, where he is a faculty member in the Master of Fine Arts program in Creative Writing.

== Bibliography ==
- Emma Who Saved My Life St. Martin's Press, 1989
- Gospel St. Martin's Press, 1993
- Show World: A Novel St. Martin's Press, 1999
- Lookaway, Lookaway St. Martin's Press, 2013
- Western Alliances St. Martin's Press, 2023
