= Abigail Cowen =

American actress (born 1998)

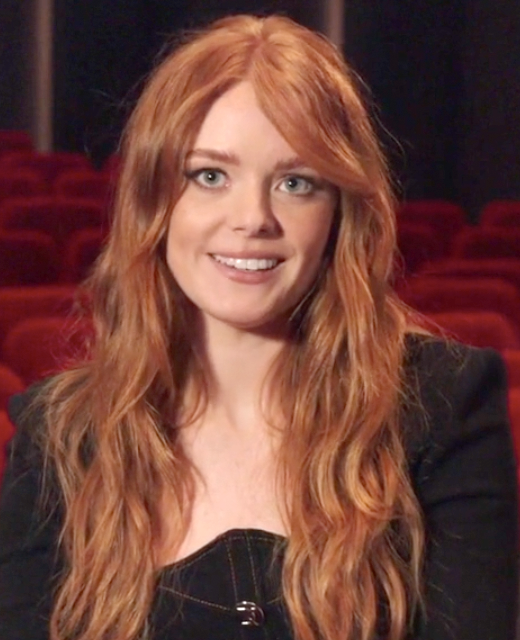
- Cowen in January 2022
- Born: March 18, 1998 (age 28); Gainesville, Florida, U.S.
- Education: University of Florida
- Occupation: Actress
- Years active: 2014–present

Abigail Cowen (born March 18, 1998) is an American actress and model. She is known for playing Dorcas in Chilling Adventures of Sabrina, Bloom in Netflix's live-action adaptation of Winx Club titled Fate: The Winx Saga and currently as Delilah Mason in Every Year After.

== Early life ==
Born in Gainesville, Florida, Cowen was home-schooled in the eighth grade after her red hair and freckles made her the subject of intense bullying. She studied public relations at the University of Florida, then moved with her family to Los Angeles, California in 2016 to further pursue an acting career.

== Career ==
Cowen started off her acting career at the age of 17, by playing Brooklyn in Fox's Red Band Society. In 2017, she played Vicki Charmichael in the second season of Netflix's Stranger Things. From 2017 to 2018, she played Mia Tanner in CBS's Wisdom of the Crowd. In 2018, she portrayed Eliza Hunter in Freeform's The Fosters, followed by Ricochet in YouTube's The Power Couple. In 2020, she made her film debut as Adrienne with I Still Believe.

From 2018 to 2020, Cowen portrayed Dorcas in Netflix's series Chilling Adventures of Sabrina. In 2021, she started playing Bloom, in Netflix's live-action adaptation of Winx Club titled Fate: The Winx Saga. She described Bloom as a stubborn, determined introvert, who discovers she has fire powers and is sent to the "Otherworld" to master them.

In 2021, Cowen starred as Fiona in Witch Hunt. On being asked whether the lessons she learnt on Chilling Adventures of Sabrina came in handy, she said “I feel like this film is so different. Yes, it is witchcraft, but they're very different characters. But just the magical element, I guess using my imagination in certain scenarios, you could say I was kind of used to. But it definitely was a completely different character, completely different type of project to tackle for me, which is fun and it was a challenge.” Next, she starred as Angel in Redeeming Love. In 2025, it was announced she would play the role of Delilah Mason in Every Year After.

== Filmography ==
=== Films ===
| Year | Title | Role | Notes |
|---|---|---|---|
| 2020 | I Still Believe | Adrienne Liesching | |
| 2021 | Witch Hunt | Fiona | |
| 2022 | Redeeming Love | Angel / Sarah | |
| 2024 | Electra | Lucy | |
| 2024 | Behind the Lines | Alta May Andrews | Documentary film |
| 2025 | The Ritual | Emma Schmidt | |

=== Television ===
| Year | Title | Role | Notes |
|---|---|---|---|
| 2014 | Red Band Society | Brooklyn | Episode: "There's No Place Like Homecoming" |
| 2017 | Stranger Things | Vicki Charmichael | 2 episodes (season 2) |
| 2017–2018 | Wisdom of the Crowd | Mia Tanner | Recurring role |
| 2018 | The Fosters | Eliza Hunter | 4 episodes (season 5) |
| 2018–2020 | Chilling Adventures of Sabrina | Dorcas Night | Recurring role |
| 2019 | The Power Couple | Ricochet | Television miniseries |
| 2021–2022 | Fate: The Winx Saga | Bloom | Main role |
| 2026–present | Every Year After | Delilah Mason | Main role |

=== Music videos ===
| Year | Title | Artist(s) | Ref. |
|---|---|---|---|
| 2019 | "Hold Together" | Tomo featuring Ana Michell | |
| 2023 | "Blood" | Andrew Matarazzo | |
