= Fox Faith =

Film studio brand

- Type: Film
- Industry: Media
- Founded: 2006; 20 years ago
- Defunct: 2009; 17 years ago
- Fate: Closed
- Successor: 20th Century Fox
- Headquarters: United States
- Parent: 20th Century Fox; 20th Century Fox Home Entertainment

Fox Faith (also spelled FoxFaith) was a brand of film studio 20th Century Fox targeting evangelical Christians.

Established under 20th Century Fox Home Entertainment in 2006, Fox Faith acquired independent Christian-themed films for theatrical and video release. 20th Century Fox described Fox Faith titles as "morally-driven, family-friendly programming," and requires them to "have overt Christian [c]ontent or be derived from the work of a Christian author."

The label's theatrical releases were by arrangement with the AMC Theatres and Carmike Cinemas chains, and most of their films were digital releases.

All of the Fox Faith film library are now owned by the Walt Disney Company, following Disney's acquisition of 21st Century Fox on March 20, 2019.

== Films ==
- Love's Abiding Joy (2006) ... Distributor (2006) (US) (television)
- One Night with the King (2006) ... Distributor (2006) (US) (theatrical)
- Thr3e (2007) (US) (theatrical)
- The Last Sin Eater (February 9, 2007) ... Distributor (2007) (US) (theatrical)
- The Ultimate Gift (March 9, 2007) (US) (theatrical)
- The Final Inquiry (2006) (a.k.a. The Inquiry / L'Inchiesta) ... Distributor (2007) (US) (theatrical)
- Moondance Alexander (2007) ... Distributor (2007) (US) (theatrical)
- Saving Sarah Cain (2007) ... Distributor (2007) (US) (television)
- A Good Man Is Hard to Find (2008) (V) ... Distributor (2008) (US) (all media)
- Ace of Hearts (2008) ... Distributor (2008) (US) (Theatrical)
- Mama, I Want to Sing! (2009) ... Distributor (2009) (US) (all media)

== See also ==
- Pinnacle Peak Pictures
- Kingdom Studios
- Affirm Films
- Five & Two Pictures
- Gener8Xion Entertainment
- Provident Films
- Reverence Gospel Media
- Kendrick Brothers
- Sherwood Pictures
- Lightworkers Media
