= Tyndale House =

American Christian book publishing company

- Founded: 1962
- Founder: Kenneth N. Taylor
- Country of origin: United States
- Headquarters location: Carol Stream, Illinois
- Publication types: Books
- Imprints: Tyndale Momentum, SaltRiver, Hendrickson
- No. of employees: approximately 250
- Official website: www.tyndale.com

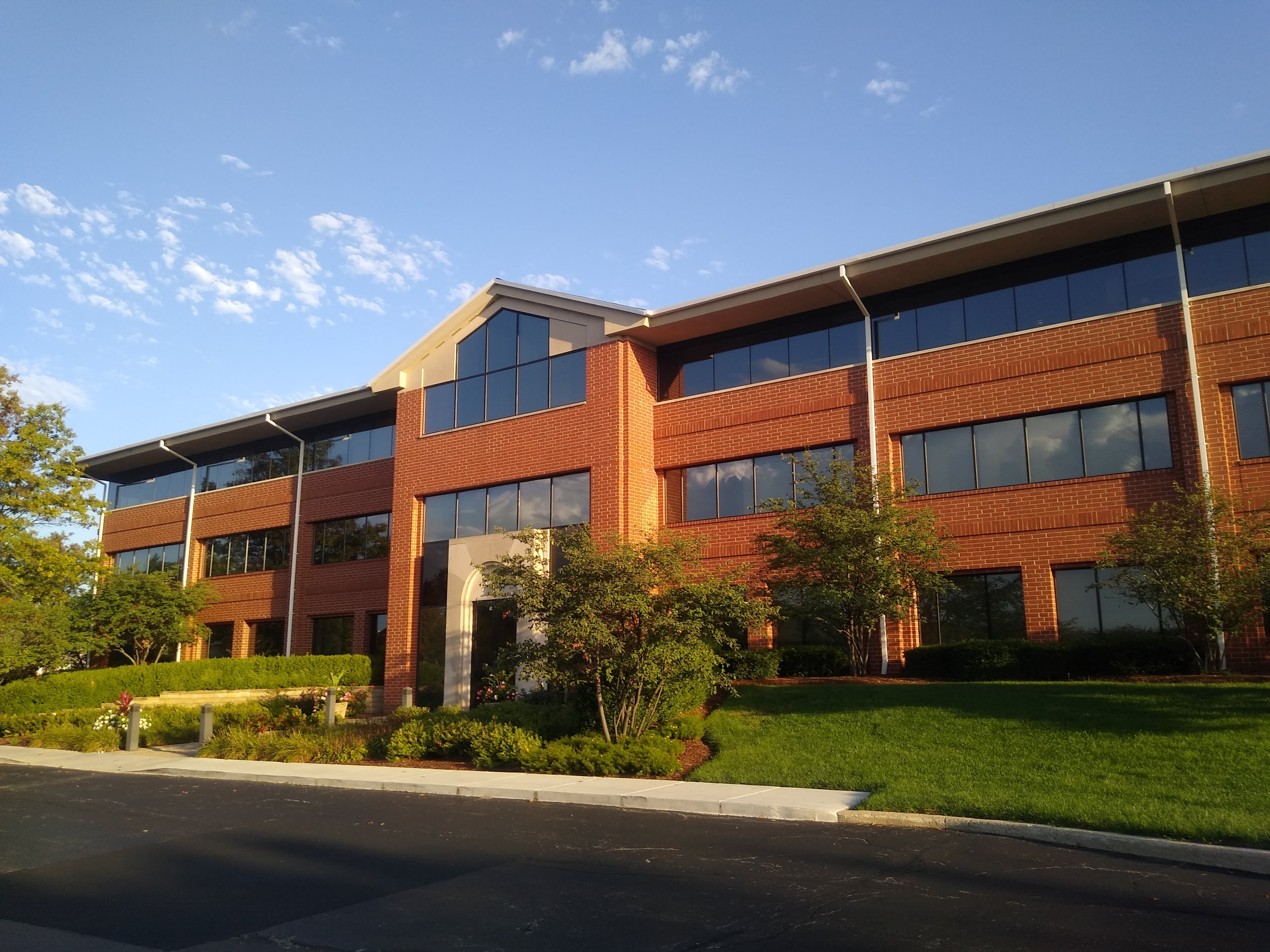
The main office building at the Tyndale House headquarters in Carol Stream, Illinois, in the Chicago area. The headquarters complex also features a distribution facility.

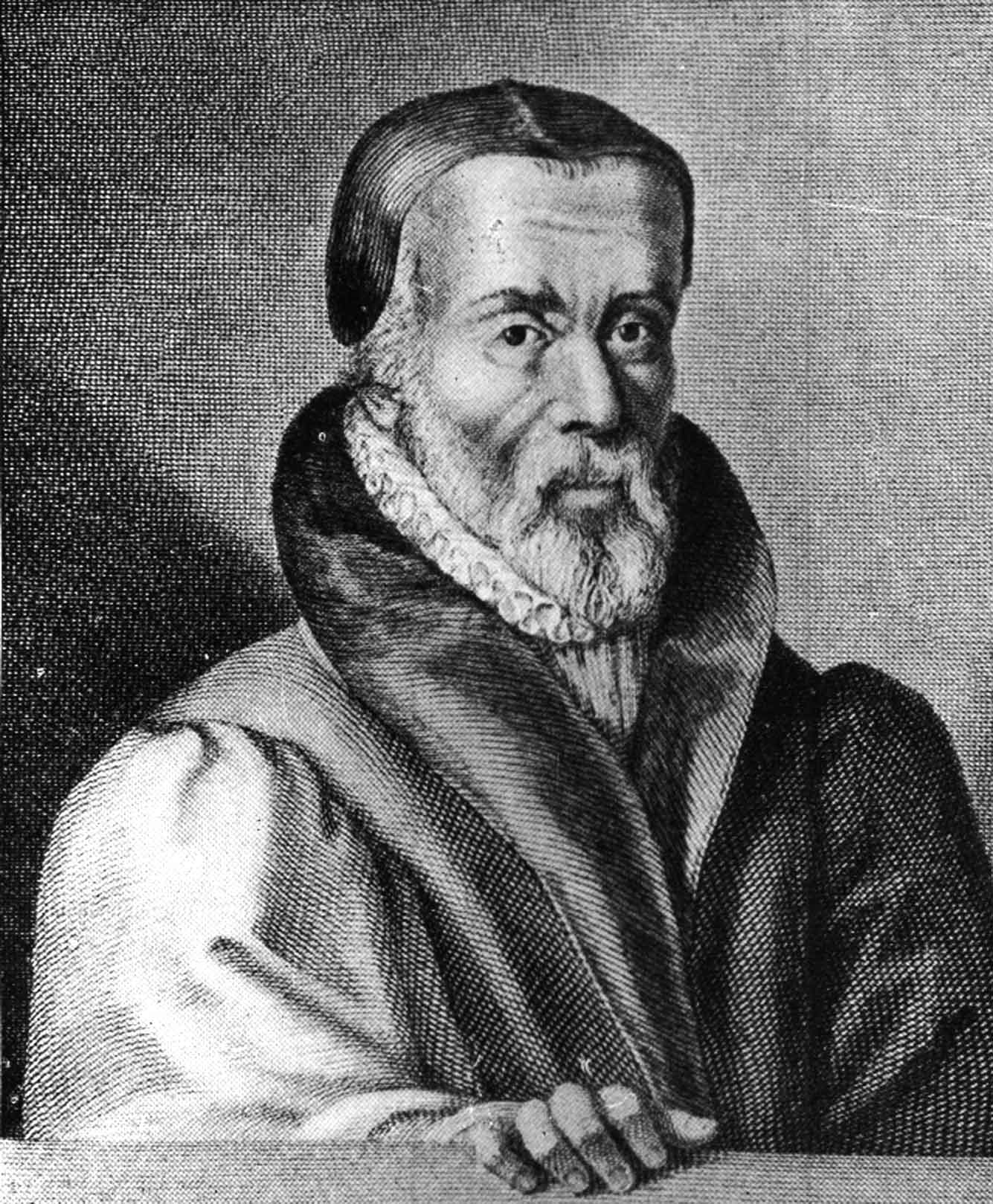
William Tyndale

Tyndale House (also known by its sister organization Tyndale House Foundation) is a Christian publisher in Carol Stream, Illinois.

== History ==
Tyndale was founded in 1962 by Kenneth N. Taylor in order to publish his paraphrase of the Epistles, which he had composed while commuting to work at Moody Press in Chicago. The book appeared under the title Living Letters, and received a television endorsement from Billy Graham. This ensured the book's great success, and in 1971 Tyndale published Taylor's complete Living Bible. Taylor named the company after William Tyndale, whose English translation of the New Testament was first printed in 1526. After Kenneth Taylor retired, his son, Mark D. Taylor, became the CEO. In 2021, Scott Mathews became the newest CEO.

During the first nine years of Tyndale's history, Kenneth N. Taylor continued paraphrasing the text of the Bible. Living Letters was followed by Living Prophecies (1965) and The Living New Testament (1967). Finally, The Living Bible was launched in 1971. According to Publishers Weekly, it was the bestselling book in the United States in the years 1972–1974. The Living Bible was published in many different editions and binding styles, including a popular youth edition called The Way and a study edition called The Life Application Study Bible.

In 2007, Quiet Strength by Tony Dungy reached No. 1 on the New York Times hardcover, non-fiction list. It spent more than 30 weeks on either the primary or extended list, and has sold well more than one million copies. It is one of the best-selling sports-related titles in history. Subsequent books by Dungy, including Uncommon (2009), The Mentor Leader (2010), and The One Year Uncommon Life Daily Challenge (2011), have all reached the New York Times best sellers list.

Tyndale's first non-fiction book to reach No. 1 on the New York Times hardcover, non-fiction list was Let's Roll, by Lisa Beamer. Beamer (born April 10, 1969 in Albany, New York) is the widow of Todd Beamer, a victim of United Flight 93 crash as part of the September 11, 2001 attacks in the United States.

In 1996 Tyndale House released a new English translation of the Bible under the title New Living Translation (NLT). While its predecessor, The Living Bible, was a paraphrase, the NLT is a translation that was created by a team of 90 Hebrew and Greek scholars. The NLT copyright belongs to Tyndale House Foundation, which means that all a share of the profits from the sales of the Bible go towards the Foundation's charitable grants. A major revision of the NLT, aimed at making the translation more precise, was finished in 2004. A third revision in 2007 made minor alterations that had been suggested by the Translation Committee. Multiple other revisions followed, and the 2015 revision today incorporates edits from the Catholic edition created around the same time.

Tyndale also developed a British branch, which was named Coverdale House Publishers. Coverdale co-published a British edition of The Living New Testament with Hodder & Stoughton in 1974 and merged with another publisher, Victory Press, in 1977. The British company eventually became Kingsway Publications Ltd, which was sold to Kingsway Trust in 1979, and joined Cook Communications Ministries in 1993. Kingsway Books was one of the most prominent Christian paperback producers in the UK until it ceased trading in 2013.

In 2016, Tyndale combined its two nonfiction imprints into one larger imprint, Tyndale Momentum.

In 2021, Tyndale acquired Hendrickson Publishers along with Rose Publishing.
