= List of Christian fiction authors =

This is a list of authors of Christian fiction.

== Allegory ==
- John Bunyan
- Ted Dekker
- Nathaniel Hawthorne
- Hannah Hurnard
- Steven James
- Robert Jordan
- C.S. Lewis
- George MacDonald
- R.C. Sproul

== Amish ==
- Beverly Lewis

== Biblical ==
- Lynn Austin
- Sigmund Brouwer
- Davis Bunn
- Gene Edwards
- Joyce Fox
- David Gregory
- Hank Hanegraaf
- Angela Hunt
- Tosca Lee
- Max Lucado
- Janette Oke
- Francine Rivers
- Charles Sheldon
- Tommy Tenney
- Bodie Thoene
- Brock Thoene
- Joan Wolf

== Contemporary ==
- Terri Blackstock
- Don Brown
- Davis Bunn
- Melody Carlson
- Lori Copeland
- Ted Dekker
- Robin Jones Gunn
- Irene Hannon
- Dee Henderson
- Angela Hunt
- Denise Hunter
- Jerry Jenkins
- Jan Karon
- Karen Kingsbury
- Debbie Macomber
- Krista McGee
- Joyce Meyer
- Bill Myers
- Frank Peretti
- Tracie Peterson
- Deborah Raney
- Francine Rivers
- Nancy Rue
- Lauraine Snelling
- Debbie Viguié
- Robert Whitlow
- Eric Wilson

== Suspense/thriller ==
- Traci Hunter Abramson
- Terri Blackstock
- Don Brown
- Colleen Coble
- Ted Dekker
- Irene Hannon
- Dee Henderson
- DiAnn Mills
- Frank E. Peretti
- Joel C. Rosenberg

== Historical ==
- Tamera Alexander
- Lynn Austin
- Taylor Caldwell
- Mary Connealy
- Joyce Fox
- Irma Joubert
- Julie Klassen
- Tim LaHaye
- Gilbert Morris
- Lynn Morris
- Janette Oke
- Delia Parr
- Tracie Peterson
- Francine Rivers
- Lauraine Snelling
- Lori Wick

== Novels ==
- Joyce Fox
- Dawn Batterbee Miller

== Fiction for children ==
- Dora van der Meiden-Coolsma
- Blanche Margaret Milligan
- J. A. Pérez
- Albert Capwell Wyckoff

== Literary ==
- Frederick Buechner
- Fyodor Dostoyevsky
- Marilyn Robinson

== Other ==
- Wendy Alec
- Orson Scott Card
- Alton Gansky
- Joe Hilley
- Angela Elwell Hunt
- Stephen R. Lawhead
- Dandi Daley Mackall
- Greg Mitchell
- Gilbert Morris
- Flannery O'Connor
- David Oyedepo
- Frank Peretti
- Wladislaw Somerville Lach-Szyrma
- Debbie Viguie
- Melanie Wells
- John White
- William P. Young

== See also ==
- Christian novel
- List of Christian novels
- Christy Award
