= Mary Connealy =

American author

Mary Alice Moore Connealy
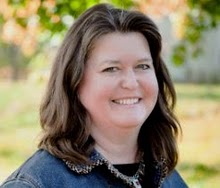
- Born: 1956 (age 69–70); Oakland, Nebraska
- Occupation: Writer
- Spouse: Yes
- Children: Four daughters
- Website: maryconnealy.com

Mary Alice Moore Connealy (born 1956) is an American author of Christian fiction who specializes in romantic comedy set in the cowboy era of the American west.

== Early life ==
Connealy was born in Oakland, Nebraska, and grew up on a farm in rural Lyons, Nebraska. She is the third of eight children of farmer and social worker Jackson Moore, and social worker and pianist Dorothy (Frew) Moore.

Connealy attended Jefferson School, a one-room country school house, for eight years during elementary school, and graduated from Lyons High School in 1974. She earned a Bachelor of Science degree in Mass Communications, graduating magna cum laude from Wayne State College, Wayne, Nebraska, in 1976.

== Career ==
Connealy wrote for ten years before she got her first book published, and had 20 finished books when she made her first sale. She published her first books with Barbour Publishing. After writing nineteen books for Barbour Publishing, she signed with Bethany House, a division of Baker Publishing Group, in 2011. Out of Control appeared on the Christian Booksellers Association national best-sellers list in September 2011 and also on the Evangelical Christian Publishers Association (ECPA) national fiction best-seller list. Connealy is also published by Thomas Nelson Publishing, a division of HarperCollins Publishers LLC. Connealy was a finalist for best first book in the American Christian Fiction Writer's (ACFW) 2008 Carol Awards with Petticoat Ranch. Doctor in Petticoats was a finalist for a 2011 RITA Award finalist-Best Inspirational Romance. Calico Canyon was a nominee for a Christy Award. Calico Canyon featured the opening line: "The Five Horseman of the Apocalypse rode in. Late as usual."

== Selected published works ==
- Lassoed in Texas
  - Petticoat Ranch (Barbour Publishing, 2007) ISBN 1620297957
  - Calico Canyon (Barbour Publishing, 2008) ISBN 1624162193
  - Gingham Mountain (Barbour Publishing, 2009) ISBN 1624167268
  - Lassoed in Texas Trilogy – containing all three books (Barbour Publishing, 2010) ISBN 1616262168
- Montana Marriage
  - Montana Rose (Barbour Publishing, 2009) ISBN 1602601429
  - The Husband Tree (Barbour Publishing, 2009) ISBN 1602601437
  - Wildflower Bride (Barbour Publishing, 2010) ISBN 1602601453
  - Montana Marriage Trilogy – containing all three books (Barbour Publishing, 2011) ISBN 1616262214
- Sophie's Daughters
  - Doctor in Petticoats (Barbour Publishing, 2010) ISBN 1602601461
  - Wrangler in Petticoats (Barbour Publishing, 2010) ISBN 160260147X
  - Sharpshooter in Petticoats (Barbour Publishing, 2011) ISBN 1602601488
  - Sophie's Daughters Trilogy – containing all three books (Barbour Publishing, 2011) ISBN 1616266996
- Wild West Weddings
  - Cowboy Christmas (Barbour Publishing, 2009) ISBN 1602601453
  - Deep Trouble (Barbour Publishing, 2011) ISBN 1602601496
- The Kincaid Brides series
  - Out of Control (Bethany House Publishing 2011) ISBN 0764209116
  - In Too Deep (Bethany House Publishing 2012) ISBN 0764209124
  - Over the Edge (Bethany House Publishing 2012) ISBN 0764209132
- Trouble in Texas Series
  - Swept Away (Bethany House Publishing 2013) ISBN 0764209140
  - Fired Up (Bethany House Publishing 2013) ISBN 0764209159
  - Stuck Together (Bethany House Publishing 2014) ISBN 0764209167
- Wild at Heart Series
  - Tried & True (Bethany House Publishing 2014) ISBN 0764211781
  - Now & Forever (Bethany House Publishing 2015) ISBN 076421179X
  - Fire & Ice (Bethany House Publishing 2015) ISBN 0764211803
- Cimarron Legacy Series
  - The Boden Birthright (Bethany House Publishing 2016) ASIN: B01CRHOTJQ
  - No Way Up (Bethany House Publishing 2016) ISBN 0764211811
  - Long Time Gone (Bethany House Publishing 2017) ISBN 076421182X
  - Too Far Down (Bethany House Publishing 2017)
- High Sierra Sweethearts Series
  - The Accidental Guardian (Bethany House Publishing 2018) ISBN 0764219294
  - The Reluctant Warrior (Bethany House Publishing 2018) ISBN 9780764219306
  - The Unexpected Champion (Bethany House Publishing 2019) ISBN 0764219316
- Brides of Hope Mountain Series
  - Aiming for Love (Bethany House Publishing 2019) ISBN 0764232584
  - Woman of Sunlight (Bethany House Publishing 2020) ISBN 0764232592
  - Her Secret Song (Bethany House Publishing 2020) ISBN 0764232606
- Brothers in Arms Series
  - Braced for Love (Bethany House Publishing 2021) ISBN 0764237721
  - A Man with a Past (Bethany House Publishing 2021) ISBN 076423773X
  - Love on the Range (Bethany House Publishing 2021) ISBN 0764237748
- The Lumber Baron's Daughters Series
  - The Elements of Love (Bethany House Publishing 2022) ISBN 0764239589
  - Inventions of the Heart (Bethany House Publishing 2022) ISBN 0764239597
- Model of Devotion (Bethany House Publishing 2022) ISBN 978-0-7642-3960-1 Wyoming Sunrise Series
  - Forged in Love (Bethany HoMarshause Publishing 2023) ISBN 0764239589
  - Laws of Attraction (Bethany House Publishing 2023) ISBN 0764244396

Marshaling Her Heart (Bethany House Publishing 2023) ISBN 076424115X

The Western Light Series

- Chasing the Horizon (Bethany House Publishing 2024) ISBN 0764242652
- Toward the Dawn (Bethany House Publishing 2024) ISBN 0764242660
- Into the Sunset (Bethany House Publishing 2024) ISBN 0764242679

The Golden State Treasure Series

- Whispers of Fortune (Bethany House Publishing 2025) ISBN 0764239589
- Legends of Gold (Bethany House Publishing 2025) ISBN 764244396
- Riches Beyond Measure (Bethany House Publishing 2025) ISBN 0764244418

Rocky Mountain Marshals Series

- Ambush of the Heart (Bethany House Publishing 2026) ISBN 0764245996

Garrison's Law Series (contemporary Romantic Suspense)

- Loving the Texas Lawman (Amazon Digital Services LLC) ISBN 1722162031
- Loving Her Texas Protector (Amazon Digital Services LLC) ISBN 1723046647
- Loving the Texas Negotiator (Amazon Digital Services LLC) ISBN 1726275043
- Loving the Texas Stranger (Amazon Digital Services LLC) ISBN 1790624355
- Loving the Mysterious Texan (Amazon Digital Services LLC) ISBN 1793267553

Romantic Thriller

- Ten Plagues: A Romantic Thriller (Amazon Digital Services, 2018) ISBN 1721025170
- Novella Collections
  - Black Hills Blessing (Barbour Publishing, 2010) ISBN 1602608008
  - A Bride for All Seasons (Thomas Nelson Publishing 2013) ISBN 1401688535
  - Alaska Brides Collection (Barbour Publishing, 2013) ISBN 162416739X
  - A Match Made in Texas (Bethany House Publishing 2014) ISBN 0764211765
  - Four Weddings and a Kiss (Thomas Nelson Publishing 2014) ISBN 1401688543
  - The Homestead Brides Collection (Barbour Publishing 2015) ISBN 1630586862
  - 12 Brides of Christmas (Barbour Publishing 2015) ISBN 1630584894
  - With This Ring? (Bethany House Publishing 2016) ISBN 0764217720
  - Lassoed by Marriage (Barbour Publishing 2016) ISBN 1634091205
  - 12 Brides of Summer (Barbour Publishing 2017) ISBN 1634090292
  - The Calico and Cowboys Romance Collection: Love Is a Lighthearted Adventure in Eight Novellas from the Old West (Barbour Publishing 2017) ISBN 1683224027
  - Hearts Entwined: A Historical Romance Novella Collection by Mary Connealy/Karen Witemeyer/Regina Jennings/Melissa Jagears ISBN 0764230328

Three Christmas Novellas: Longhorn Christmas, The Sweetest Gift, The Christmas Candle (Amazon Digital Services LLC 2018) ASIN B07HQ46F3F

- ebooks
  - Room at the Inn for Christmas (St. Martin's Press Swerve 2016) ASIN: B01JGMQDTO
  - The Advent Bride (Shiloh Run Studios 2014) ASIN: B00NTI2YXG
- Nosy in Nebraska ISBN 1602604185
- Bury the Lead (Ten Talents Publishing 2011) ASIN: B007QO8RKS
- Fright at the Museum (Ten Talents Publishing 2011) ASIN: B007QOAZL2
- Trial and Terror (Ten Talents Publishing 2011) ASIN: B007QOAYQ8
- Ten Plagues: A Romantic Thriller (Amazon Digital Services, 2018) ISBN 1721025170

== Awards ==
Romance Writer's of America Milestone Pin 50 books published American Christian Fiction Writers (acfw.com) Milestone Pin 50 books published

- Genesis Award Winner 2004 Long Historical Romance-Petticoat Ranch—for unpublished manuscripts
- Genesis Award Finalist 2004 Long Historical Romance-Montana Rose—for unpublished manuscripts
- Carol award Winner 2008 Short Historical Romance– Golden Days
- Carol award Finalist 2008 Best First Book-Petticoat Ranch
- Christy Award Finalist 2009-Calico Canyon
- Carol Award Finalist—4 Time 2009 Best Long Historical Romance-Montana Rose, Two time Best Short Contemporary Romance-Buffalo Gal, Clueless Cowboy, Best Short Mystery-Of Mice...and Murder
- Carol award winner 2010 Long Historical Romance -Cowboy Christmas
- RITA Award finalist-Best Inspirational 2011
- Carol Award Finalist Best Long Historical Romance 2011-The Husband Tree
