= Lynette Eason =

American novelist

- Education: University of South Carolina (BA); Converse University (MEd)
- Occupation: Author
- Writing career
- Genre: Christian fiction
- Website: lynetteeason.com

Lynette Eason is an author of Christian fiction novels within the inspirational romantic suspense genre; she has won various awards for her writing and been on the ECPA and CBA bestseller lists and published nearly fifty books.

== Personal life and education ==
Lynette Eason grew up in Greenville, South Carolina, where she became a Christian at age eight through the influence of her parents and the Sunday school teachers at Northgate Baptist Church. An avid reader as a child, she was influenced by many writers including "Alfred Hitchcock, Carolyn Keene, Agatha Christie, Francine Pascal...Steven King and others." As an adult she enjoyed Christian fiction by "Randilyn Collins, Dee Henderson, Shirlee McCoy, Karen Kingsbury, Robert Liparulo, Terri Blackstock and Deborah Raney"

She graduated from the University of South Carolina in 1989 with a B.A. in Finance and Real Estate and then graduated from Converse University in Spartanburg, South Carolina in 1993 with an M.Ed. in Special Education and Teaching. After graduation she taught school for a period at a school for deaf and blind children, and she is fluent in American Sign Language. In 1996 she married her neighbor, Jack Eason, a Christian consultant and worship leader. Eason and her family were active at New Life Baptist Fellowship Church in Boiling Springs, South Carolina where she served as a Sunday School teacher. Lynette Eason currently resides with her husband in Simpsonville, South Carolina, and they have two adult children, Lauryn and Will.

== Writing career ==
Eason began writing in 1999 to cope with loneliness during her husband's work travels, and she received her first book contract eight years later. She has published nearly fifty books and currently writes for Revell and for Harlequin's Love Inspired Suspense line and spends at least eight hours a day writing and generally completes her books within two to four months. The movie, Her Stolen Past, was based on Lynette's novel and premiered on the Lifetime Movie Network in 2018.

== Awards ==
Eason has won or been nominated for various writing awards including the Inspirational Reader's (IRCC) Choice Award, the Selah Award, three ACFW Carol Awards, the Daphne, the Christian Retailing's Best 2017 Award, a top ten finish in the James Patterson 2016 co-writer contest, and others. She has also been on the Publishers Weekly, ECPA and CBA bestseller lists.

== Published works ==
- Women of Justice series
- Deadly Reunions series
- Code of Valor
- Called To Protect.
