= DiAnn Mills =

American writer of Christian fiction

DiAnn Mills is an American writer of Christian fiction.

== Biography ==
Her novels have appeared on the Christian Booksellers Association and Evangelical Christian Publishers Association bestseller lists and have placed in the American Christian Fiction Writer’s Book of the Year Awards from 2003 to 2008. DiAnn was a Carol Award finalist, of the American Christian Fiction Writers, in 2010 and 2011. She received the Romantic Times Inspirational Readers Choice award in 2005, 2007, and 2010. She was a Christy Award finalist in 2008, and a Romantic Times RITA Award finalist in 2010. DiAnn won the Christy Award for Breach of Trust in 2010, and in 2011 she won the Christy Award for Sworn to Protect, the first and second books in her Call of Duty series.

DiAnn is a founding board member for American Christian Fiction Writers and a member of Inspirational Writers Alive; Romance Writers of America’s Faith, Hope and Love chapter; and the Advanced Writers and Speakers Association. She speaks to various groups and teaches writing workshops around the country. DiAnn is also the Craftsman mentor for the Jerry B. Jenkins Christian Writers Guild.

== Awards ==
- 2014 Family Fiction Top 10 Novels – "Firewall"
- 2011 Christy Award (winner) - Sworn to Protect
- 2011 Carol Award (finalist) - Pursuit of Justice
- 2011 Daphne du Maurier Award for Excellence (finalist) - Pursuit of Justice
- 2011 Golden Quill Award (finalist) - A Woman Called Sage
- 2011 Colorado Romance Writers - Award of Excellence (finalist) - Pursuit of Justice
- 2010 Christy Award (winner) - Breach of Trust
- 2010 Inspirational Reader's Choice (winner) - Breach of Trust
- 2010 RITA (finalist) - Breach of Trust
- 2010 Carol Award (finalist) - Breach of Trust
- 2008 Christy Award (finalist) - Lightning and Lace
- 2007 Inspirational Reader's Choice (winner) - Novella The Peacemaker
- 2005 Inspirational Reader's Choice (winner) - Footsteps
- 2005 Inspirational Reader's Choice (winner) - Novella At the End of the Bayou from Hidden Motives
