= Nancy Rue =

American novelist (born 1951)

- Born: July 27, 1951 (age 75); Riverside, New Jersey, U.S.
- Occupation: Novelist
- Spouse: Jim Rue
- Children: Marijean S. Rue (daughter)
- Writing career
- Genre: Christian fiction
- Notable works: The Lily Series and The Sophie Series
- Website: www.nancyrue.com

Nancy N. Rue (born July 27, 1951) is an American Christian novelist, writing for tweens and adults. She is known for the Lily Series of novels featuring 12-year-old Lily Robbins. She is also known for the Sophie series.

== Background ==
Nancy N. Rue was born on July 27, 1951, in Riverside, New Jersey as the third child in her family. When she was four her family moved to Jacksonville, Florida, where she was raised, and later attended Stetson University, the College of William and Mary, and the University of Nevada. She has stated that one of the reasons she started writing novels for tween girls is to help both the girls and their mothers more easily discuss body and social issues, citing difficulty talking to her own mother about sex and other issues.

== Career ==
In 1973 at age 22, after getting her degree in English and her teacher's certificate, Rue began teaching English at Booker T. Washington High School. She taught for a few years there and became a writer, sending many stories for teens to several different magazines. Later Rue met with a writer she knew and wrote a nonfiction book for kids. This was her first published book. She kept pursuing her dream of writing and soon became a well-known author for the Lily series, and many more Christian novels.

== Awards ==
Her novel The Reluctant Prophet won a 2011 Christy Award for "Contemporary Series" and is a finalist in the Fiction category of the 2012 Christian Book Awards, to be presented by the Evangelical Christian Publishers Association. Romantic Times awarded Antonia's Choice the 2003 Best Inspirational Novel.

== See also ==
- List of Christian fiction authors
