= Michael Phillips (writer) =

American writer and editor

Michael Phillips is an author, and editor of Christian fiction. and a scholar of George MacDonald.

== Biography ==
Michael Phillips graduated in 1969 from Humboldt State University with a degree in physics and has run independent bookstores in both California and Oregon. He has written for the Christian market since 1977 and is the author of more than a hundred books. Phillips is recognized as one of the premier novelists of the Christian fiction boom of the 1980s, while his books have been translated into eight different languages. In addition to his own work, he has published eighty titles by and about George MacDonald, including George MacDonald: Scotland's Beloved Storyteller and The Cullen Collection.

Phillips served as the general series editor for the Masterline Series of four literary monographs focused on MacDonald, including volumes by Ronald MacDonald, Rolland Hein, David Robb, and Richard Reis and brought out eighteen edited editions of MacDonald's novels between 1982 and 2006.

== Critical reception ==
Phillips has been credited with "the first efforts to re-introduce [MacDonald's] novels," while his Cullen Collection has been praised as "examples of the tremendous progress that has been made recently in printed versions." John Pennington, professor of English at St. Norbert College, raised concerns about Phillips's attempts "to promote MacDonald as a conservative Christian whose message is needed to ward off a godless society", while praising George MacDonald: A Writer's Life for "doggedly—in a good sense—track[ing] down the various editions of particular novels to determine what is the most reliable edition that is closest to MacDonald's vision."

== Works ==
=== Novels ===
==== Stonewycke trilogy ====
The Stonewycke Trilogy was written with Judith Pella and published by Bethany House Publishers.

- The Heather Hills of Stonewycke, 1985, Bethany House Publishers
- Flight From Stonewycke, 1985, Bethany House Publishers
- Lady of Stonewycke, 1986, Bethany House Publishers

==== Stonewycke Legacy trilogy ====
The Stonewycke Legacy was written with Judith Pella and published by Bethany House Publishers.

- Shadows over Stonewycke, 1987, Bethany House Publishers
- Stranger at Stonewycke, 1987, Bethany House Publishers
- Treasure of Stonewycke, 1988, Bethany House Publishers

==== The Journals of Corrie Belle Hollister series ====
The Journals of Corrie Belle Hollister series was written with Judith Pella and published by Bethany House Publishers.

- My Father's World, 1990, Bethany House Publishers
- Daughter of Grace, 1990, Bethany House Publishers
- On the Trail of the Truth, 1991, Bethany House Publishers
- A Place in the Sun, 1991, Bethany House Publishers
- Sea to Shining Sea, 1992, Bethany House Publishers,
- Into the Long Dark Night, 1992, Bethany House Publishers,
- Land of the Brave and the Free, 1993, Bethany House Publishers, ISBN 1598569880
- Home for the Heart, 1994, Bethany House Publishers, ISBN 1598569872
- Grayfox, 1993, Bethany House Publishers, 1993
- The Braxtons of Miracle Springs, 1996, Bethany House Publishers, 1996
- A New Beginning, 1997, Bethany House Publishers, 1997

==== The Russians trilogy ====
The Russians trilogy was written with Judith Pella.

- The Crown and the Crucible, 1991, Bethany House Publishers
- A House Divided, 1992, Bethany House Publishers
- Travail and Triumph, 1992, Bethany House Publishers

==== Jackson Maxwell duet ====
- Pinnacles of Power, 1991, Moody Press
- Depths of Destiny, 1992, Moody Press

==== Secret of the Rose series ====
- The Eleventh Hour, 1993, Tyndale House Publishers
- A Rose Remembered, 1994, Tyndale House Publishers
- Escape to Freedom, 1994, Tyndale House Publishers
- Dawn of Liberty, 1995, Tyndale House Publishers

==== Mercy and Eagleflight series ====
- Mercy and Eagleflight, 1997, Tyndale House Publishers
- A Dangerous Love, 1997, Tyndale House Publishers

==== Adam Livingstone duet ====
- Rift in Time, 1997, Tyndale House Publishers
- Hidden in Time, 2000, Tyndale House Publishers

==== Secrets of Heathersleigh Hall series ====
- Wild Grows the Heather in Devon, 1998, Bethany House Publishers
- Wayward Winds, 1999, Bethany House Publishers
- Heathersleigh Homecoming, 1999, Bethany House Publishers
- A New Dawn over Devon, 2001, Bethany House Publishers

==== Caledonia duet ====
- Legend of the Celtic Stone, 1999, Bethany House Publishers
- An Ancient Strife, 2000, Bethany House Publishers

==== Destiny Chronicles duet ====
- Destiny Junction, 2002, Destiny Image Publishers
- King's Crossroads, 2002, Destiny Image Publishers

==== Shenandoah Sisters and Carolina Cousins series ====
- Angels Watching over Me, 2002, Bethany House Publishers
- A Day to Pick Your Own Cotton, 2002, Bethany House Publishers
- The Color of Your Skin Ain't the Color of Your Heart, 2003, Bethany House Publishers
- Together Is All We Need, 2004, Bethany House Publishers
- A Perilous Proposal, 2005, Bethany House Publishers
- A Soldier's Lady, 2006, Bethany House Publishers
- Never Too Late, 2007, Bethany House Publishers
- Miss Katie's Rosewood, 2007, Bethany House Publishers

==== American Dreams trilogy ====
- Dream of Freedom, 2005, Tyndale House Publishers
- Dream of Life, 2006, Tyndale House Publishers
- Dream of Love, 2008, Tyndale House Publishers

==== Angel Harp duet ====
- Angel Harp, 2011, Faith Words
- Heather Song, 2011, Faith Words

==== Green Hills of Snowdonia duet ====
- From Across the Ancient Waters, 2012, Barbour Books
- The Treasure of the Celtic Triangle, 2012, Barbour Books

==== Beyond trilogy ====
- Garden at the Edge of Beyond, 1998, Bethany House Publishers
- Hell and Beyond, 2012, Sunrise Books
- Heaven and Beyond, 2015, Sunrise Books

==== Secrets of the Shetlands trilogy ====
- The Inheritance, 2016, Bethany House Publishers
- The Cottage, 2016, Bethany House Publishers
- The Legacy, 2017, Bethany House Publishers

==== Tribulation Cult duet ====
- The Invisible War, 2024, Fidelis Publishing
- Birth of a Remnant, 2024, Fidelis Publishing

==== Single Titles series ====
- The Peacemaker (as "Mark Livingstone"), 1990, Bethany House Publishers (with Judith Pella)
- The Cappuccino Club, 2013, Sunrise Books
- The Sword, the Garden, and the King, 2013, Sunrise Books
- Murder by Quill, 2014, Sunrise Books
- Angel Dreams, 2014, Sunrise Books (with Chris Schneider)
- The Eyewitness Gospel, 2017, Sunrise Books
- Legacy, 2020, Sunrise Books

=== Non-fiction ===
==== Early non-fiction ====
- A Christian Family in Action (1977), Bethany House Publishers
- Growth of a Vision (1977), Sunrise Books
- Does Christianity Make Sense? (1978), Scripture Press
- Blueprint for Raising a Child (1978, Logos Publishing
- A Survival Guide for Tough Times (1979), Bethany House Publishers
- Control Through Planned Budgeting (1979), Bethany House Publishers
- Building Respect, Responsibility, and Spiritual Values in Your Child (1981)
- A Vision for the Church (1981), Sunrise Books
- Getting More Done in Less Time (1982), Bethany House Publishers
- In Quest of Gold, the Jim Ryun Story (1984), Harper & Row
- Good Things to Know (1992), Bethany House Publishers
- Good Things to Remember (1993), Bethany House Publishers
- A Tribute (1997), Sunrise Books
- Best Friends for Life (with Judy Phillips, 1997), Bethany House Publishers

==== Devotional ====
- A God to Call Father, 1994, Tyndale House Publishers
- God a Good Father, 2001, Destiny Image Publishers
- Jesus An Obedient Son, 2002, Destiny Image Publishers
- Make Me Like Jesus, 2003, WaterbrookPress
- Endangered Virtues, 2023, Fidelis Publishing

=== Works by and about George MacDonald ===
==== Biography ====
- George MacDonald Scotland's Beloved Storyteller, 1987, Bethany House Publishers
- George MacDonald, A Writer's Life, 2018, Sunrise WisePath Books
