= Beverly Lewis (author) =

American novelist

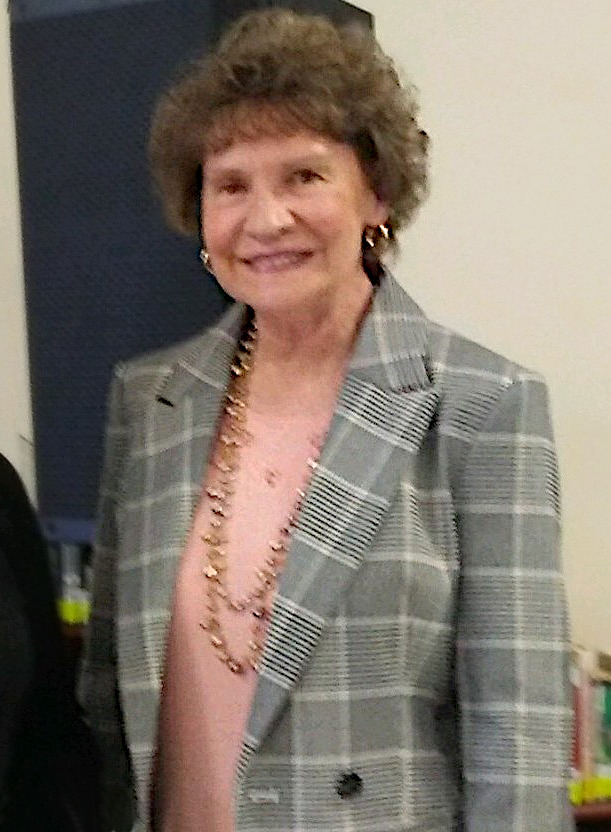
- Lewis at a book signing at Eckhart Public Library in Auburn, Indiana, on April 12, 2018.
- Born: Beverly Marie Jones
- Education: Evangel University
- Spouse: David Lewis
- Children: 3
- Writing career
- Genre: Christian fiction
- Notable awards: Christy Award (2007)

Beverly Marie Lewis (née Jones) is an American Christian fiction novelist and adult and children's author of over 100 books.

Lewis is a former schoolteacher and musician. She started playing the piano at age four, and began writing short stories and poetry when she was nine years old.

Much of her writing focuses on the Old Order Amish. Her maternal grandmother, Ada Ranck Buchwalter, was born into an Old Order Mennonite Church, which interested Lewis in her own "plain heritage." Her father was a pastor in Lancaster, Pennsylvania (the heart of the Pennsylvania Dutch community), where she was born and grew up. She was raised and continues to be part of the Assemblies of God community.

She went to Evangel University, and received the Distinguished Alumnus Award in 2003. She is also a member of the National League of American Pen Women.

Lewis is married to David Lewis, and they have three grown children and three grandchildren. They live in Colorado.

== Awards ==
- Rated 8 among the Top 10 Christian Authors for 2009 by the ECPA.
- Lewis, Beverly. The Judgment, The Rose Trilogy #2. Baker Publishing Group. ECPA 2011's BestSeller ListsBest of 2011.
- Lewis, Beverly. The Mercy, Rose Trilogy Series #3. Baker Publishing Group. ECPA 2011's BestSeller ListsBest of 2011.
- The Brethren: won the Christy Award in 2007 for Contemporary Series.
- The Preacher's Daughter: won the Library Journal's Best Genre Fiction in 2005.
- The Prodigal: Crossings Book of the Year in 2004.
- The Betrayal: Inspirational Readers Choice - first place for Long Historical in 2004.

== Works ==
The full collection of listed books have been published by Bethany House publishers.

=== The Heritage of Lancaster County series ===
Series reprinted in 2002.

1. The Shunning, 1997
2. The Confession, 1997
3. The Reckoning, 1998

=== The Amish Country Crossroads series ===
Series reprinted in 2007.

1. The Postcard, 1999
2. The Crossroad, 1999
3. Sanctuary, June 2001(with David Lewis)

=== Abram's Daughters series ===
1. The Covenant, September 2002
2. The Betrayal, September 2003
3. The Sacrifice, May 2004
4. The Prodigal, October 2004
5. The Revelation, June 2005

=== Annie's People series ===
1. The Preacher's daughter, November 2005
2. The Englisher, May 2006
3. The Brethren, October 2006

=== The Courtship of Nellie Fisher series ===
1. The Parting, 2007
2. The Forbidden, May 2008
3. The Longing, October 2008

=== Seasons of Grace series ===
1. The Secret, April 2009
2. The Missing, September 2009
3. The Telling, April 6, 2010

=== The Rose trilogy ===
1. The Thorn, September 2010
2. The Judgment, April 2011
3. The Mercy, September 2011

=== Home to Hickory Hollow series ===
1. The Fiddler, April 2012
2. The Bridesmaid, September 2012
3. The Guardian, March 2013
4. The Secret Keeper, September 2013
5. The Last Bride, April 2014

=== Other works ===
- The Sunroom, May 1998
- The Redemption of Sarah Cain, July 2000
- October Song, October 2001
- The Beverly Lewis Amish Heritage Cookbook, 2004
- "The Atonenent," 2016
- "The First Love," 2018
- "The Heirloom," 2023

=== Youth fiction ===
==== The Cul-de-Sac Kids series ====
1. The Double Dabble Surprise, March 1995
2. The Chicken Pox Panic, March 1995
3. The Crazy Christmas Angel Mystery, March 1995
4. No Grown-ups Allowed, August 1995
5. Frog Power, August 1995
6. The Mystery of Case D. Luc, August 1995
7. The Stinky Sneakers Mystery, May 1996
8. Pickle Pizza ,May 1996
9. Mailbox Mania, May 1996
10. The Mudhole Mystery, March 1997
11. Fiddlesticks, March 1997
12. The Crabby Cat Caper, March 1997
13. Tarantula Toes, August 1997
14. Green Gravy, August 1997
15. Backyard Bandit Mystery, August 1997
16. Tree House Trouble, February 1998
17. The Creepy Sleep-Over, February 1998
18. The Great TV Turn-Off, February 1998
19. Piggy Party, February 1999
20. The Granny Game, February 1999
21. Mystery Mutt, February 2000
22. Big Bad Beans, February 2000
23. The Upside-Down Day, January 2001
24. The Midnight Mystery, January 2001

==== Girls Only (GO!) series ====
These books were republished by Bethany House into two volumes (books 1–4, books 5–8) in 2008.

1. Dreams on Ice, August 1998
2. Only the Best, September 1998
3. A Perfect Match, May 1999
4. Reach for the Stars, September 1999
5. Follow the Dream, July 2000
6. Better Than Best, October 2000
7. Photo Perfect, May 2001
8. Star Status, May 2002

==== Holly's Heart series ====
These books were republished by Bethany House into 3 volumes (books 1–5, books 6–10, books 11–14) in September 2008.

1. Best Friend, Worst Enemy, November 2001
2. Secret Summer Dreams, November 2001
3. Sealed With a Kiss, January 2002
4. The Trouble With Weddings, January 2002
5. California Crazy, July 2002
6. Second-Best Friend, July 2002
7. Good-Bye, Dressel Hills, November 2002
8. Straight-A Teacher, November 2002
9. No Guys Pact, January 2003
10. Little White Lies, January 2003
11. Freshman Frenzy, May 2003
12. Mystery Letters, May 2003
13. Eight is Enough, November 2003
14. It's a Girl Thing, November 2003

==== Summerhill Secrets series ====
These books were republished by Bethany House into 2 volumes (books 1–5, books 6–10) in 2007.

1. Whispers Down the Lane, May 1995
2. Secret in the Willows, May 1995
3. Catch a Falling Star, November 1995
4. Night of the Fireflies, November 1995
5. A Cry in the Dark, June 1996
6. House of Secrets, November 1996
7. Echoes in the Wind, June 1997
8. Hide Behind the Moon, April 1998
9. Windows on the Hill, March 1999
10. Shadows Beyond the Gate, April 2000

==== Other picture books ====
- Cows in the House, October 1998
- Just Like Mama, October 2002
- Annika's Secret Wish with CD, October 2004
- What is Heaven Like?, October 2006
- In Jesse's Shoes, Fall 2007
- What is God Like?, September 2008

== Film adaptations ==
Saving Sarah Cain is based on the 2000 standalone novel The Redemption of Sarah Cain. The movie was first shown on Lifetime in 2007.

The Shunning, based on the first novel in Lewis' Heritage of Lancaster County, premiered on the Hallmark Channel on April 16, 2011.

The Confession, based on the second novel in Lewis' Heritage of Lancaster County series, premiered on the Hallmark Channel on May 11, 2013, in the U.S.

The Reckoning, based on the third novel in Lewis' Heritage of Lancaster County series, premiered on the Hallmark Channel on October 11, 2015, in the U.S.
