= Dee Henderson =

American novelist

- Education: University of Illinois Urbana-Champaign (BS)
- Occupation: Author
- Writing career
- Genre: Christian fiction
- Notable work: Danger in the Shadows
- Notable awards: RITA award – Inspirational Romance; 2000 Danger in the Shadows
- Website: www.deehenderson.com

Dee Henderson is an American author of Christian fiction novels within the inspirational romantic suspense genre; she has won various awards for her writing and been on The New York Times Best Seller list.

== Personal life ==
Dee Henderson is a lifelong inhabitant of Illinois, currently residing in Springfield. She is the daughter of a pastor and started writing as a child. Henderson graduated from the University of Illinois in 1988 with a B.S. in computer science and worked for a decade as an engineer before starting to publish professionally. She started writing fiction for publication in 1996. Henderson is single and enjoys painting, reading, walking around her subdivision, and spending time with her dogs. She still attends her childhood church. Publishers Weekly described Henderson one of the "bestselling and perennial favorites" published by Bethany House, a division of Baker Publishing Group.

== Published works ==
=== O'Malley Series ===
- Danger In The Shadows: a Prequel To The O'Malleys (1999)
- The Negotiator (1999)
- The Guardian (2001)
- The Truth Seeker (2001)
- The Protector (2001)
- The Healer (2002)
- The Rescuer (2003)
- Jennifer: An O'Malley Love Story (2013)

=== Uncommon Heroes ===
- True Devotion (2000)
- True Valor (2002)
- True Honor (2002)
- True Courage (2004) (Also known as Kidnapped)

=== Stand alones ===
- The Marriage Wish (2007)
- God's Gift (1998)
- The Witness (2006)
- Before I Wake (2006)
- Full Disclosure (2012)
- Unspoken (2013)
- Undetected (2014)
- Taken (2015)
- Sins of the Past (2016)
- Kidnapped (2004)

=== Evie Blackwell Cold Case ===
- Traces of Guilt #1 (2016)
- Threads of Suspicion #2 (2017)

== Awards ==
- 2000 - Romance Writers of America RITA Award, Inspirational Romance – Danger in the Shadows

Henderson has also won or been nominated for various other writing awards including: the Christy Award, the Evangelical Christian Publishers Association Gold Medallion, the Holt Medallion, the National Readers' Choice Award, and the Golden Quill.
