= Deborah Raney =

American writer (born 1955)

Deborah Raney (born 1955) is an American writer of Christian novels and romance novels. She has written or contributed to more than 40 books.

== Early life and education ==
Raney was born in San Antonio, Texas in 1955 and grew up in Rice County, Kansas, the eldest of five children. Raised on a farm, she was inspired by Laura Ingalls Wilder's popular Little House on the Prairie series. She graduated from Lyons High School in Lyons, Kansas, and subsequently attended Emporia State University and later, Kansas State University.

== Career ==
Raney wrote A Vow to Cherish, her first novel, which was borne from a discussion with her husband and teenage children about Alzheimer's disease that drew on her experiences working in a New York nursing home early in her marriage. The book, published by Bethany House Publishers, won the 1997 Angel Award from Excellence in Media. It has been translated into Danish, Norwegian, Swedish and Dutch, and was also published in a hardcover large-print edition by Thorndike Press.

In 1999, World Wide Pictures adapted the book into a screenplay that became a made-for-television movie. The movie was rebroadcast a second time in December 2004, and was released on video and DVD in seven languages. Ten years after its first publication, A Vow to Cherish was reissued in trade and mass market formats by Steeple Hill books.

After the releases of two additional novels, In the Still of the Night (Bethany House 1997) and Kindred Bond (Bethany House 1998), Raney penned Beneath a Southern Sky in 2001. The Waterbrook Press (Random House) novel won the 2001 Romantic Times Reviewers' Choice Award, the 2002 Inspirational Readers' Choice Award, Book of the Year for American Christian Romance Writers, and Romance Writers of America's 2002 RITA Award.

After the Rains was published by Waterbrook Press in 2002 earned Book of the Year Honors (2003) from the American Christian Fiction Writers (ACFW), was a Romantic Times Reviewers' Choice nominee (2002) and named a Top 20 Fiction book (2002) by Christian Book Distributors.

Raney's next release, Playing by Heart, a novella, was published by Barbour Books in 2003. It earned ACFW Book of the Year honors (2004), was a 2004 Christy Award Finalist, and recognized with the National Readers Choice Award for Best Novella (2003).

Since then, Raney has written or contributed to more than 40 other books, most notably her Clayburn Novels series and Hanover Falls Novels series from Howard, an imprint of Simon & Schuster, and her Chicory Inn Novels series from Abingdon Press. She was on the executive board of the American Christian Fiction Writers for 18 years, and has been on faculty at the organization's annual writers conference since 2001. She has also been on faculty at other writers conferences, including Christian Writers Guild Write for the Soul, Oregon Christian Writers Conference, Mount Hermon Christian Writers Conference, Blue Ridge Mountains Christian Writers Conference, Colorado Christian Writers Conference and Autumn in the Mountains Novelists Retreat.

With her husband, Ken Raney, whom she met in met in 1973, she reissued many of her early books through Raney Day Press, including Beneath a Southern Sky, After the Rains, A Scarlet Cord, Because of the Rain, Above All Things, A Nest of Sparrows, A Scarlet Cord, The Face of the Earth, Insight, Over the Waters, A Vow to Cherish, Within This Circle and other works. She has four children.

== Selected works ==
- A Vow to Cherish (Bethany House, 1996) ISBN 0-764-22335-6
- In the Still of Night (Bethany House, 1997) ISBN 0-7642-8128-3
- Kindred Bond (Bethany House, 1998)
- Children's Sermons to Go (Abingdon Press, 1998) ISBN 0-687-05257-2
- Beneath a Southern Sky (Waterbrook Press/Random House, 2001) ISBN 978-1-57856-427-9
- More Children's Sermons to Go Abingdon Press, 2001) ISBN 0-687-09962-5
- Circle of Blessings novella in "A Currier & Ives Christmas" (Barbour Books, 2002), ISBN 978-1586605520
- After the Rains (Waterbrook Press/Random House, 2002) ISBN 1-57856-576-6
- Playing by Heart (Barbour Books, 2003) ISBN 1-58660-491-0
- A Scarlet Cord (Waterbrook Press/Random House, 2003) ISBN 1-57856-577-4
- A Nest of Sparrows (Waterbrook Press/Random House 2004) ISBN 1-57856-578-2
- Over the Waters (Steeple Hill Books, 2005) ISBN 1-57856-578-2
- Finally Home novella in "Missouri Memories" (Barbour Books, 2007) ISBN 1-59789-595-4
- Within This Circle (Steeple Hill, 2007) ISBN 0-373-78594-1

=== Clayburn novels series ===
- Remember to Forget (Howard Books/Simon & Schuster, 2007) ISBN 1-58229-643-X
- Leaving November (Howard Books/Simon & Schuster, 2008) ISBN 1-4165-5829-2
- Yesterday's Embers (Howard Books/Simon & Schuster, 2009) ISBN 1-4391-5851-7
- Insight (Steeple Hill, 2009) ISBN 0-373-78644-1
- Above All Things (Steeple Hill, 2009) ISBN 0-373-78655-7
- Beneath a Southern Sky (Waterbrook Press/Random House, 2010, reissue), ISBN 978-0-307-45876-6
- Circle of Blessings in "A Prairie Christmas Collection" (Barbour Books, 2010, 2013) ISBN 978-1616260040

=== Hanover Falls novels series ===
- Almost Forever (Howard/Simon & Schuster 2010) ISBN 978-1-4165-9991-3
- Forever After (Howard/Simon & Schuster 2011) ISBN 978-1-4165-9993-7
- After All (Howard/Simon & Schuster 2012) ISBN 978-1416599951
- Face of the Earth (Howard/Simon & Schuster 2013) ISBN 978-1416599975
- Silver Bells (Summerside Press/Guideposts 2013) ISBN 978-0824934378
- A January Bride (HarperCollins/Zondervan 2013, ebook, rewrite/reissue of "Playing by Heart") ASIN B00DL10HDA
- Because of the Rain (Greenbrier Press 2014/Raney Day Press 2015, update and reissue of "In the Still of Night")
- A January Bride novella in "Winter Brides" (HarperCollins/Zondervan 2014, print anthology) ISBN 978-0310338284

=== Chicory Inn novels series ===
- Home to Chicory Lane (Abingdon Press August 2014) ISBN 978-1426769696
- Two Roads Home (Abingdon Press June 2015) ISBN 9781426770418
- Another Way Home (Abingdon Press October 2015) ISBN 978-1426770456
- Close to Home (Abingdon Press June 2016)
- Home at Last (Abingdon Press February 2017)
- Right Where We Belong (Raney Day Press April 2017)

=== Chandler Sisters novels series ===
- Reason to Breathe (Gilead Publishers October 2018)
- Chasing Dreams (Kregal Publications October 2019)
- Finding Wings (Kregel Publications October 2020)
- The Society of Second Chances (Guideposts 2020)
- Love's Pure Light ("Making Room at the Inn" in Christmas collection from Barbour Books 2020)
- Bridges (Raney Day Press January 2021)
- O Little Town ("The Wondrous Gift" in Christmas collection from Kregel Publications 2022)
- Breath of Heaven (Raney Day Press 2022)
