= Heart of a Hero =

Heart of a Hero may refer to:

- Heart of a Hero, a Chance Thomas score in The Lord of the Rings Online
- Heart of a Hero, a Luther Vandross score in Hero
- Heart of a Hero, a 1994 TV documentary about Canine Companions for Independence
- Heart of a Hero, a theme song in Disney Junior
- Heart of a Hero, a song by Club Danger
- Heart of a Hero, a song by Cathy Heller
- Heart of a Hero, a consumable item in Conan Exiles
- Heart of a Hero, a novel series by Laura Trentham
- The Heart of a Hero, a 1916 silent film
- The Heart of a Hero, a novel by Susan May Warren
- The Heart of a Hero, a 2013 autobiography by Clarence Singleton
- Dex: The Heart of a Hero, a 2007 book by Caralyn Buehner
