= Sara Mitchell =

American novelist

- Born: October 21, 1949 (age 76)
- Occupations: Writer; novelist

Sara Mitchell (born October 21, 1949) is an American writer and novelist. Her historical novel, Virginia Autumn was a winner of the Maggie Award and a Christy Award finalist.
