= Anomaly (series) =

2013 trilogy by Krista McGee

- Cover for the first book, Anomaly
- Anomaly, Luminary, Revolutionary
- Author: Krista McGee
- Country: United States
- Language: English
- Genre: Young adult novel, Christian fiction
- Publisher: Thomas Nelson
- Published: 2013
- Media type: Print, e-book

Anomaly is a 2013 dystopian science-fiction Christian trilogy by Krista McGee, published through Thomas Nelson. The first book in the series, Anomaly, was published on July 9, 2013. The series's second entry, Luminary, was published on January 7, 2014. A third entry, Revolution was published in July 2014. The series follows a seventeen-year-old girl living in a post-apocalyptic society that punishes the expression of emotion.

While writing the series McGee was inspired by the books Brave New World and Nineteen Eighty-Four, as she wondered what the books would be like if they were written from the Christian worldview perspective.

== Summary ==
=== Anomaly ===
Thalli is a young girl living in a world that was almost completely destroyed by nuclear war, forcing the survivors underground. The survivors' leaders, a group of scientists called "The Ten", decided that it would be best for human survival if future children were genetically engineered to be without emotions, as emotions were what led to the war.

Thalli was born with emotions, a secret unknown to The Ten until she accidentally reveals them while listening to a piece of music. She's spared from death by scientist and childhood friend Berk, who attempts to save her by proposing that the scientists study her instead of killing her. Thalli and Berk bond even closer while she's in captivity, prompting more emotions that would be condemned if The Ten were to learn about it. While she's imprisoned Thalli hears tales of the "Designer", a being more powerful than The Ten and the science they endorse; Thalli and her emotions might be part of the Designer's plan, which is far broader than anything The Ten could conceive.

=== Luminary ===
Luminary picks up after the events in Anomaly. Thalli, Berk, Rhen, and John, fleeing the scientists, have escaped to the surface. As they journey the group discovers various things that the underground world had assumed destroyed or ruined forever, such as animals, books, and nature itself. They also discover other survivors in a colony called New Hope.

As she and the others try to adapt to their new surroundings, Thalli finds herself skeptical of her past and everything she'd previously believed to be true. She's unwilling to trust anything, including the steadily growing feelings that she has for Berk. This helps spur Thalli into volunteering to help serve on a peace mission to Athens, a nearby settlement reported to be violent and crafty. She's warned against trusting Athens' ruler, but Thalli becomes charmed by the ruler's son Alex and is soon infatuated with him. As things continue to progress behind the scenes, Thalli finds that war between the settlements might be inevitable, making her question her newfound faith in the Designer even as her friend John's faith is unwavering.

== Publications ==
1. Anomaly (July 9, 2013)
2. Luminary (January 7, 2014)
3. Revolutionary (July 2014)

== Reception ==
The critical reception for the first book, Anomaly, was mostly positive, and praise typically centered upon how McGee wrote the characters. The School Library Journal and Publishers Weekly gave positive reviews but noted that the work had some issues. The reviewer for School Library Journal felt that the "dialogue's formal, clipped language can be off-putting". Publishers Weekly commented, "Though Thalli’s 'conversion' after learning of the Designer is underdeveloped, McGee successfully asks readers to consider both what it means to act (or not act) on human emotions and the role such emotions play in relationships with God."

Reviews for Luminary were more mixed. The School Library Journal wrote that they found the religious themes "tepid" and felt that there were "better-written alternatives" out there for people interested in Christian dystopian fiction. Kirkus Reviews was similarly critical and commented that "This simplistic dystopia delivers formulaic romance and a large dose of religious faith." Publishers Weekly was more positive: "McGee blends the determination of faith, the malevolence of those who extol power over decency, and the assertion of individual integrity in a humane glimpse at youthful courage."
