= Gilbert Morris =

American novelist (1929–2016)

Gilbert Leslie Morris
- Born: May 13, 1929; Forrest City, Arkansas, U.S.
- Died: February 18, 2016 (aged 86); Gulf Shores, Alabama, U.S.
- Education: University of Arkansas (PhD); University of London
- Occupation: Author
- Spouse: Johnnie Yvonne Fegert (m. 1949; died 2013)
- Children: 3, including Lynn
- Parent(s): Osceola McCoy Morris; Jewell Irene Gilbert Morris

Gilbert Leslie Morris (May 13, 1929 – February 18, 2016) was an American Christian author. He is also cited as Gilbert L. Morris or Gilbert Leslie Morris.

Gilbert was born May 24, 1929, in Forrest City, Arkansas, the son of Osceola McCoy and Jewell Irene Gilbert Morris.

He was a pastor for 10 years before becoming an English professor at Ouachita Baptist University in Arkansas. He has a Ph.D. at the University of Arkansas. During the summers of 1984 and 1985, he did postgraduate work at the University of London.

He lived in Gulf Shores, Alabama with his wife, Johnnie Yvonne Fegert Morris. They married May 20, 1949, in Little Rock, Arkansas, and had 3 children; a daughter Lynn Morris, a son Alan Blake Morris, who both co-wrote with him as well as another daughter named Stacy Morris Smith. His granddaughter Dixie, who helped write the Dixie Series, also lived in Gulf Shores, with her husband Brad Downs and their son Jackson Gilbert Downs.

Many of Morris' books are published by Bethany House Publishers.

== Books by Dr. Gilbert Morris ==
Dr. Morris wrote many series, as well as authoring with others.

=== House of Winslow series ===
This series chronicles the Winslow family from Gilbert, who was on the Mayflower, continuing on through American history until Luke, who fought in World War II.

Published by Bethany House.

The first part of this series was originally published with one set of covers (starting in 1986), and then in 2004, they started republishing them all with a new set of covers. Everything from that point on (from The Shining Badge forward) was never published with the original design. The new covers do not feature a book number, but instead focus on the year the story took place.

1. The Honorable Imposter, 1986 - story of Gilbert Winslow in 1620
2. The Captive Bride, 1987 - story of Rachel Winslow in 1659
3. The Indentured Heart, 1988 - story of Adam Winslow in 1740
4. The Gentle Rebel, 1988 - story of Nathan Winslow in 1775
5. The Saintly Buccaneer, 1988 - story of Paul Winslow in 1777 (American Revolution)
6. The Holy Warrior, 1989 - story of Christmas Winslow in 1798
7. The Reluctant Bridegroom, 1990 - story of Sky Winslow in 1838
8. The Last Confederate, 1990 - story of Thad Novak and the Winslows in 1860 (Civil War)
9. The Dixie Widow, 1991 - story of Belle Winslow Wickham and Davis Winslow in 1862 (Civil War)
10. The Wounded Yankee, 1992 - story of Zack Winslow in 1862
11. The Union Belle, 1992 - story of Mark Winslow and Lola Montez in 1867
12. The Final Adversary, 1992 - story of Barney Winslow in 1894
13. The Crossed Sabres, 1993 - story of Thomas Winslow in 1875
14. The Valiant Gunman, 1993 - story of Dan Winslow in 1874
15. The Gallant Outlaw, 1994 - story of Lanie Winslow and Lobo Smith in 1890
16. The Jeweled Spur, 1994 - story of Laurie Winslow and Cody Rogers in 1883
17. The Yukon Queen, 1995 - story of Cassidy Winslow and Serena Stevens in 1896
18. The Rough Rider, 1995 - story of Aaron Winslow and his brother Lewis in 1893 (Rough riders in Cuba)
19. The Iron Lady, 1996 - story of cousins Esther, Ruth, and Priscilla Winslow in 1903
20. The Silver Star, 1997 - story of Priscilla Winslow in 1905
21. The Shadow Portrait, 1998 - story of cousins Peter and Phil Winslow in 1907
22. The White Hunter, 1999 - story of John Winslow (Africa) and Annie Rogers (Titanic) in 1912
23. The Flying Cavalier, 1999 - story of Lance Winslow in 1914 (France)
24. The Glorious Prodigal, 2000 - story of Stuart and Leah Winslow in 1917
25. The Amazon Quest, 2001 - story of Emily Winslow in 1918
26. The Golden Angel, 2001 - story of Erin Winslow in 1922
27. The Heavenly Fugitive, 2002 - story of siblings Phillip and Amelia Winslow in 1927
28. The Fiery Ring, 2002 - story of Joy Winslow in 1928
29. The Pilgrim Song, 2003 - story of Lewis and his daughter Hannah Winslow in 1929 (Great Depression)
30. The Beloved Enemy, 2003 - story of Joshua Winslow in 1931
31. The Shining Badge, 2004 - story of Jennifer Winslow in 1931
32. The Royal Handmaid, 2004 - story of Travis Winslow in 1935
33. The Silent Harp, 2004 - story of Sharon Winslow in 1935
34. The Virtuous Woman, 2005 - story of Grace Winslow in 1935
35. The Gypsy Moon, 2005 - story of Gabrielle Winslow in 1940
36. The Unlikely Allies, 2005 - story of Mallory Anne Winslow in 1940
37. The High Calling, 2006 - story of Katherine Winslow in 1940
38. The Hesitant Hero, 2006 - story of Tyler Winslow in 1940
39. The Widow's Choice, 2006 - story of Alona Winslow Jennings in 1941
40. The White Knight, 2007 - story of Luke Winslow in 1942

The Winslow Breed is a trilogy of prequels.

1. Honor in the Dust, 2009 - story of Stuart Winslow (reign of King Henry VIII)
2. When the Heavens Fall, 2010 - story of Brandon Winslow (reign of Queen Mary)
3. As the Sparks Fly Upward, 2011 - story of Colin Winslow (reign of Queen Elizabeth I)

=== Appomattox Saga series ===
Published by Tyndale House. Republished beginning in 2000 by Living Books.

1. A Covenant Of Love, 1992 - story of Clay Rocklin
2. Gate Of His Enemies, 1992 - story of Denton Rocklin and Deborah Steele
3. Where Honor Dwells, 1993 - story of Rachel Franklin
4. Land Of The Shadow, 1993 - story of Paul Bristol
5. Out Of The Whirlwind, 1994 - story of Burke Rocklin
6. The Shadow Of His Wings, 1994 - story of Lowell Rocklin
7. Wall Of Fire, 1995 - story of Allyn Griffeth Rocklin
8. Stars In Their Courses, 1995 - story of Frank Rocklin
9. Chariots In The Smoke, 1997 - story of David Rocklin
10. A Witness In Heaven, 1998 - story of Austin and Marie Bristol

=== Reno Western Saga ===
Published by Tyndale House.

This series was originally called Jim Reno Westerns Series, and when the first four books were republished in 1992, they renamed the books and the series.

1. Reno, 1992 (originally The Drifter, 1986)
2. Rimrock, 1992 (originally The Deputy, 1986)
3. Ride The Wild River, 1992 (originally The Runaway, 1987)
4. Boomtown, 1992 (originally The Vigilante, 1988)
5. Valley Justice, 1995
6. Lone Wolf, 1995

=== Price of Liberty series ===
Published by W Publishing Group. Co-written with Bobby Funderburk.

1. A Call To Honor, 1993
2. The Color Of The Star, 1993
3. All The Shining Young Men, 1993
4. The End Of Glory, 1993
5. A Silence In Heaven, 1993
6. A Time To Heal, 1994

=== Far Fields series ===
Published by Stardust Publishers. Co-written with Bobby Funderbuck

1. Beyond the River, 1993
2. The Remnant, 1997

=== American Century series ===
Published by Revell Publishers.

This set was originally called the American Odyssey Series. Each book has been renamed for a new publication beginning in 2005.

1. A Bright Tomorrow, 2005 (originally A Time to be Born, 1994)
2. Hope Takes Flight, 2006 (originally A Time to Die, 1994)
3. One Shining Moment, 2006 (originally A Time to Laugh, 1995)
4. A Season of Dreams, 2007 (originally A Time to Weep, 1996)
5. Winds of Change, 2007 (originally A Time for War, 1997)
6. Pages of Promise, 2007 (originally A Time to Build, 1998)
7. Dawn of a New Day, 2008 (this conclusion was not previously published)

=== Wakefield Dynasty series ===
Published by Tyndale House Publishers.

1. The Sword Of Truth, 1994
2. The Winds Of God, 1994
3. The Shield Of Honor, 1995
4. The Fields Of Glory, 1995
5. The Ramparts Of Heaven, 1996
6. The Song Of Princes, 1997
7. A Gathering Of Eagles, 1998

=== Cheney Duvall, M.D. series ===
This series was co-written with his daughter, Lynn Morris

Published by Bethany House: "A trailblazing woman of courage, Cheney Duvall graduates from the first American college to grant degrees to women physicians just as the Civil War ends. Long-standing prejudices have not dissipated, however, and she must prove herself time and again--testing her dedication and the faith that compels her."

1. The Stars for a Light, 1994
2. Shadow of the Mountains, 1994
3. A City Not Forsaken, 1995
4. Toward the Sunrising, 1996
5. Secret Place of Thunder, 1996
6. In The Twilight, In The Evening, 1997
7. Island of the Innocent, 1998
8. Driven With the Wind, 2000

=== Liberty Bell series ===
Published by Bethany House. This series shared several characters with the House of Winslow series, especially those of "The Indentured Rebel". '

1. Sound The Trumpet, 1995
2. Song In A Strange Land, 1996
3. Tread Upon The Lion, 1996
4. Arrow Of The Almighty, 1997
5. Wind From The Wilderness, 1998
6. The Right Hand Of God, 1999
7. Command The Sun, 2000

=== Katy Steele Adventures ===
Published by Tyndale House Publishers. Co-written with his son, Alan Morris.

1. Tracks Of Deceit, 1996
2. Imperial Intrigue, 1996
3. Depths of Malice, 1997

=== Spirit Of Appalachia series ===
This series was co-written with Aaron McCarver.

Published by Bethany House: "America's first frontier were the misty Appalachian Mountains and the men and women who braved their crossing needed all the faith, courage, and hope they could muster. This series brings together all the romance, excitement, and danger of early frontier life."

1. Over The Misty Mountains, 1996
2. Beyond The Quiet Hills, 1997
3. Among The King's Soldiers, 1998
4. Beneath The Mockingbird's Wings, 2000
5. Around The River's Bend, 2002

=== Chronicles Of The Golden Frontier series ===
Published by Crossway Books, a division of Good News Publishers. Co-written with J. Landon Ferguson.

1. Riches Untold, 1998
2. Unseen Riches, 1999
3. Above The Clouds, 1999
4. The Silver Thread, 2000

=== Omega Trilogy ===
Published by Thomas Nelson. Co-written with his daughter and son, Lynn Morris & Alan Morris.

1. The Beginning Of Sorrows, 1999
2. Fallen Stars, Bitter Waters, 2000
3. Seven Golden Vials, never released

=== The Dani Ross Mysteries ===
This series was originally known as the Danielle Ross Mysteries. It has been republished with new names by Crossway Books, a division of Good News Publishers, and also modernized to fit the 2000 world instead of the 90s.

1. One by One, 2000 (originally Guilt by Association, 1991)
2. And Then There Were Two, 2000
3. The End of Act Three, 2001 (originally The Final Curtain, 1991)
4. Four of a Kind, 2002

Books in the original series:

- Guilt by Association, 1991
- The Final Curtain, 1991
- Deadly Deception, 1992
- Revenge at the Rodeo, 1993
- The Quality of Mercy, 1993
- Race with Death, 1994

=== Cheney and Shiloh: The Inheritance series ===
This is a follow-up series to Cheney Duvall, M.D. Also co-written with his daughter, Lynn Morris

Published by Bethany House: "Cheney Duvall is now married to Shiloh, but that doesn't mean life will get any easier. Shiloh's past continues to come back to haunt them, and the couple finds themselves swept up in adventure and excitement as they use their medical skills to help the needy."

1. Where Two Seas Met, 2001
2. The Moon By Night, 2004
3. There is a Season, 2005

=== Lions of Judah series ===
Published by Bethany House: this series is particularly about the Jewish ancestry of Jesus of Nazareth. The books focus on adventures involving early figures of the faith and are intended to provide a new perspective on these historical individuals.

1. Heart of a Lion, 2002
2. No Woman So Fair, 2003
3. The Gate of Heaven, 2004
4. Till Shiloh Comes, 2005
5. By Way of the Wilderness, 2005
6. Daughter of Deliverance, 2006

=== Lonestar Legacy series ===
Published by Integrity Publishers, a division of Thomas Nelson. More on this series is available under Lonestar Legacy.

1. Deep in the Heart, 2003
2. The Yellow Rose, 2004
3. The Eyes of Texas, 2005

=== The Creole series ===
Published by Thomas Nelson. Co-written with Lynn Morris.

1. The Exiles, 2003 (also called The Exiles: Chantel)
2. The Immortelles, 2004 (also called The Immortelles: Damita)
3. The Alchemy, 2004 (also called The Alchemy: Simone)
4. The Tapestry, 2005 (also called The Tapestry: Leonie)

=== Singing River series ===
Published by Zondervan Publishers.

1. The Homeplace, 2005
2. The Dream, 2006
3. The Miracle, 2007
4. The Courtship, 2007

=== Jacques & Cleo, Cat Detectives ===
Published by Harvest House: "For those that love cats--and suspense in the same book, this one is for you."

1. What the Cat Dragged In, 2007
2. The Cat's Pajamas, 2007
3. When the Cat's Away, 2007

=== Wagon Wheel series ===
Published by Broadman Holman (B&H Books)

1. Santa Fe Woman, 2006
2. A Man for Temperance, 2007
3. Joelle's Secret, 2008
4. Angel Train, coming June 2009

=== The Lady Trent Mysteries ===
Published by Thomas Nelson

1. The Mermaid in the Basement, 2007
2. A Conspiracy of Ravens, 2008
3. Sonnet to a Dead Contessa, 2009

=== Water Wheel series ===
Published by Broadman Holman (B&H Books)

1. The River Queen, 2011
2. The River Rose, 2012

=== Youth fiction ===
Standalone youth fiction:

- Journey to Freedom, 2000 - published by Crossway Books, a division of Good News Publishers.
- Captain Chip and the March to Victory, 1994 - published by Moody Publishers
- Corporal Chip and the Call to Battle, 1994 - published by Moody Publishers

==== Barney Buck series ====
Published by Tyndale House.

1. Barney Buck and the Buck of Goober Holler, 1985
2. Barney Buck and the flying solar-cycle, 1985
3. Barney Buck and the Kamikaze Charger, 1985
4. Barney Buck and the Rough Rider Special, 1985
5. Barney Buck and the Phantom of the Circus, 1985
6. Barney Buck and the World's Wackiest Wedding, 1986

==== Seven Sleepers series ====
Published by Moody Publishers.

1. Flight of the Eagles, 1994
2. The Gates of Neptune, 1994
3. The Sword of Camelot, 1995
4. The Caves that Time Forgot, 1995
5. Winged Raiders of the Desert, 1995
6. Empress of the Underworld, 1996
7. Voyage of the Dolphin, 1996
8. Attack of the Amazons, 1997
9. Escape with the Dream Maker, 1997
10. The Final Kingdom, 1997

==== Bonnets and Bugles series ====
Published by Moody Publishers.

1. Drummer Boy At Bull Bun, 1995
2. Yankee Belles in Dixie, 1995
3. The Secret of Richmond Manor, 1995
4. The Soldier Boy's Discovery, 1995
5. Blockade Runner, 1996
6. The Gallant Boys of Gettysburg, 1996
7. The Battle of Lookout Mountain, 1996
8. Encounter At Cold Harbor, 1997
9. Fire Over Atlanta, 1997
10. Bring the Boys Home, 1997

==== Time Navigators series ====
Published by Bethany House.

1. The Dangerous Voyage, 1995
2. Vanishing Clues, 1996
3. Race Against Time, 1997

==== Dixie Morris Animal Adventures ====
Published by Moody Publishers.

1. Dixie and Jumbo, 1998
2. Dixie and Stripes, 1998
3. Dixie and Dolly, 1998
4. Dixie and Sandy, 1998
5. Dixie and Ivan, 1998
6. Dixie and Bandit, 1998
7. Dixie and Champ, 1999
8. Dixie and Perry, 1999
9. Dixie and Blizzard, 1999
10. Dixie and Flash, 1999

==== Daystar Voyages series ====
Published by Moody Publishers and co-written by Dan Meeks.

1. Secret of the Planet Makon, 1998
2. Wizards of the Galaxy, 1998
3. Escape from the Red Comet, 1998
4. Dark Spell Over Morlandria, 1998
5. Revenge of the Space Pirate, 1998
6. Invasion of the Killer Locusts, 1999
7. Dangers of the Rainbow Nebula, 1999
8. The Frozen Space Pilot, 1999
9. The White Dragon of Sharnu, 2000
10. Attack of the Denebian Starship, 2000

==== Too Smart Jones series ====
Published by Moody Publishers.

1. Too Smart Jones and the Buried Jewels, 1999
2. Too Smart Jones and the Disappearing Dogs, 1999
3. Too Smart Jones and the Pool Party Thief, 1999
4. Too Smart Jones and the Cat's Secret, 2000
5. Too Smart Jones and the Dangerous Woman, 2000
6. Too Smart Jones and the Mysterious Artist, 2000
7. Too Smart Jones and the Spooky Mountain, 2000
8. Too Smart Jones and the Stolen Bicycle, 2000
9. Too Smart Jones and the Stranger in the Cave, 2000
10. Too Smart Jones and the Wilderness Mystery, 2000

==== Seven Sleepers: The Lost Chronicles series ====
Published by Moody Publishers.

A follow-up series to the Seven Sleepers Series.

1. The Spell of the Crystal Chair, 2000, flight of the eagles
2. The Savage Game of Lord Zarak, 2000
3. The Strange Creatures of Dr. Korbo, 2000
4. City of the Cyborgs, 2000
5. The Temptation of Pleasure Island, 2000
6. The Victims of Nimbo, 2000
7. The Terrible Beast of Zor, 2000

==== Adventures of the Kerrigan Kids series ====
Published by Moody Publishers.

1. Painted Warriors and Wild Lions: Travel in Africa (2001)
2. Buckingham Palace and the Crown Jewels: Travel in England (2001)
3. Kangaroos and the Outback: Travel in Australia (2001)
4. Nine-Story Pagodas and Double Decker Buses: Travel in Hong Kong (2001)

=== Standalone novels ===
- Delaney, 1984 - published by Tyndale House
- All That Glitters, 1999 - published by Crossway Books, a division of Good News Publishers.
- Through A Glass Darkly, 1999 - published by Bethany House
- Jacob's Way, 2001 - published by Zondervan
- Edge Of Honor, 2001 - published by Zondervan.
  - Winner of the 2001 Christy Award for North American Historical.
- Jordan's Star, 2002 - published by Zondervan.
- The Spider Catcher, 2003 - published by Zondervan.
- God's Handmaiden, 2004 - published by Zondervan.
- Charade, 2005 - published by Zondervan.
- Heaven Sent Husband, 2005 - published by Steeple Hill Books
- The Angel Of Bastogne, 2005 - published by Broadman Holman (B&H Books)

== Resources ==
- Contemporary Authors Online, Gale, 2006. Reproduced in Biography Resource Center. Farmington Hills, Mich.: Thomson Gale. 2006. Accessed Sep 8, 2006 through online library
