= Judith Pella =

American novelist

Judith Pella is an author of Christian fiction. Many of her books are historical in nature and involve extensive research.

== Background ==
Pella earned a Bachelor of Arts degree in Social Science, and worked as a registered nurse. Pella also worked as an instructional teacher’s aide for many years. She has frequently collaborated with writers Michael Phillips and Tracie Peterson. Tracie Peterson cited Pella as an influence in her writing.

== Works ==
- The Journals of Corrie Belle Hollister series (written with Michael Phillips)
1. My Father's World
2. Daughter of Grace, ASIN B01MROQUV8
3. On the Trail of the Truth, 1991
4. A Place in the Sun
5. Sea to Shining Sea, 1992, ASIN B074QP4K3G
6. Into the Long Dark Night, 1992, ASIN 1598569635
7. Land of the Brave and the Free, 1993, ISBN 1598569880
8. Home for the Heart, 1994, ISBN 1598569872
- Lone Star Legacy (published by Bethany House)
1. Frontier Lady, 1993
2. Stoner's Crossing, 1994
3. Warrior's Song, 1996
- Stonewycke Trilogy (written with Michael Phillips and published by Bethany House)
1. The Heather Hills of Stonewycke, 1993
2. Flight From Stonewycke, 1994
3. Lady of Stonewycke

This series was republished as a 3-in-1 book in 2000.

- Stonewycke Legacy (written with Michael Phillips and published by Bethany House)
1. Shadows over Stonewycke, 1995
2. Stranger at Stonewycke, 1995
3. Treasure of Stonewycke, 1995

This is a continuation to the Stonewycke Trilogy. It was republished as a 3-in-1 book in 2000.

- Ribbons of Steel series (written with Tracie Peterson and published by Bethany House)
1. Distant Dreams, 1997
2. A Hope Beyond, 1997
3. A Promise for Tomorrow, 1998
- Ribbons West series (written with Tracie Peterson and published by Bethany House)
1. Westward the Dream, 1999
2. Separate Roads, 1999
3. Ties that Bind, 2000

This is a continuation to the Ribbons of Steel series.

- Texas Angel/Heaven's Road set (published by Bethany House)
1. Texas Angel, 1999
2. Heaven's Road, 2000
- The Russians series (written with Michael Phillips and published by Bethany House)
1. The Crown and the Crucible, 1991
2. A House Divided, 1992
3. Travail and Triumph, 1992
4. Heirs of the Motherland, 1993
5. Dawning of Deliverance, 1995
6. White Nights, Red Morning, 1996
7. Passage Into Light, 1998
- Daughters of Fortune series (published by Bethany House)
1. Written on the Wind, 2002
2. Somewhere a Song, 2002
3. Toward the Sunrise, 2003
4. Homeward My Heart, 2004

This also was available in a box set in 2004.

- Patchwork Circle series (published by Bethany House)
1. Bachelor's Puzzle, 2007
2. Sister's Choice, 2008
- Standalone books
1. Blind Faith, published by Bethany House - part of the Portraits series, 1996
2. Mark of the Cross, published by Bethany House, 2006
3. Beloved Stranger, published by Bethany House, 1998

== Personal life ==
She and her husband live in Scappoose, Oregon.
