= Terri Blackstock =

American novelist

- Born: 1957 (age 68–69); Belleville, Illinois, U.S.
- Education: Wingfield High School; Northeast Louisiana University
- Occupation: Author
- Writing career
- Pen name: Terri Herrington; Tracy Hughes
- Genre: Christian fiction
- Notable awards: Christy Award (2016, 2019)
- Website: terriblackstock.com

Terri Blackstock (born 1957) is an American Christian fiction author with a focus on suspense novels. She began her career writing romance novels under the pseudonyms Terri Herrington and Tracy Hughes.

== Early life and education ==
Blackstock was born in Belleville, Illinois in 1957, and her family moved multiple times during her childhood to follow her father's career as a US Air Force officer. At age 11, she began writing poetry. After her parents divorced, she moved to Mississippi with her mother and graduated from Wingfield High School in Jackson, Mississippi in 1975.

She completed a bachelor's degree in English from Northeast Louisiana University in 1981. She left graduate school to focus on writing.

== Writing ==
Blackstock began her writing career with romance novels under the pseudonym Terri Herrington, and published her first novel, Blue Fire, in 1984. She also wrote under the pseudonym Tracy Hughes, and by the mid-1990s had published thirty-three romance novels under her pseudonyms.

In 1994, Blackstock shifted to Christian fiction, with a focus on the suspense genre, and began publishing under her married name with Zondervan, a Christian publishing imprint of HarperCollins. By 2004, the first three books in her "Cape Refuge" series reached the top of the Christian Booksellers Association bestseller list before the fourth book in the series was released. In January 2010, the first two books in the series reached the top two places in the Kindle bestseller list after Zondervan temporarily made the books available for free downloads.

In 2014, Blackstock cited Barbara Kingsolver, John Grisham, Dean Koontz, Jodi Piccoult, Harlen Coben, Pat Conroy, and Christian authors as influences on her work. By 2017, she had written 80 titles, including novels, story collections, and a devotional, and more than 7 million copies of her books had been sold.

In addition to her suspense novels, she has written Christian fiction in the women's fiction genre, including the "Seasons" series co-written with Beverly LaHaye, a founder of Concerned Women for America and the wife of Tim LaHaye.

== Awards ==
- 1988 Golden Medallion for Best Short Contemporary Novel, Romance Writers of America - for Stolen Moments (Terri Harrington)
- 1990 Career Achievement Award, Romantic Times
- RITA Award finalist, inspirational romance category - for Presumption of Guilt (1997)
- 2010 Carol Award, Suspense category - for Intervention (2009)
- 2011 Carol Award, Suspense/Thriller category - for Predator (2010)
- 2014 Carol Award, Murder/Suspense/Thriller category - for Truth-Stained Lies (2013)
- 2016 Christy Award for Suspense - for Twisted Innocence (2015)
- 2019 Short Form Christy Award - for Catching Christmas (2018)

== Selected work ==
The Sun Coast Chronicles

- Evidence of Mercy (1995)
- Justifiable Means (1996)
- Ulterior Motive (1996)
- Presumption of Guilt (1997)

Second Chances

- Never Again Good-bye (1996)
- When Dreams Cross (2000)
- Blind Trust (2000)
- Broken Wings (2000)

Newpointe 911

- Private Justice (1998)
- Shadow of Doubt (1998)
- Word of Honor (1999)
- Trial by Fire (2000)
- Line of Duty (2003)

Seasons, co-written with Beverly LaHaye

- Seasons Under Heaven (2001)
- Showers in Season (2001)
- Times and Seasons (2002)
- Season of Blessing (2003)

Cape Refuge

- Cape Refuge (2002)
- Southern Storm (2003)
- River's Edge (2005)
- Breaker's Reef (2005)

Restoration

- Last Light (2006)
- Night Light (2006)
- True Light (2007)
- Dawn's Light (2008)

Intervention

- Intervention (2010)
- Vicious Cycle (2011)
- Downfall (2012)

Moon Lighter

- Truth Stained Lies (2013)
- Distortion (2014)
- Twisted Innocence (2015)

If I Run

- If I Run (2016)
- If I'm Found (2017)
- If I Live (2018)

Stand-Alones

- The Heart Reader (2000)
- Emerald Windows (2001)
- Seaside (2001)
- The Gifted (2002)
- The Gifted Sophomores (2002)
- The Heart Reader of Franklin High (2008)
- The Listener: What if you could hear what God hears? (2008)
- Double Minds (2009)
- Predator (2010)
- Shadow in Serenity (2011)
- Covenant Child (2012)
- Catching Christmas (2018)
- Smoke Screen (2021)
- Aftermath (2022)
