= Lynn Morris (author) =

American novelist (1954–2016)

Lynn Morris (April 21, 1954 – December 14, 2016) was a Christian fiction author. She was the daughter of Gilbert Morris and co-wrote with him on most of her books.

== Books by Lynn Morris ==
=== Cheney Duvall, M.D. Series ===
This series was co-written with her father, Gilbert Morris.

Published by Bethany House: "A trailblazing woman of courage, Cheney Duvall graduates from the first American college to grant degrees to women physicians just as the Civil War ends. Long-standing prejudices have not dissipated, however, and she must prove herself time and again--testing her dedication and the faith that compels her."

1. The Stars for a Light, 1994
2. Shadow of the Mountains, 1994
3. A City Not Forsaken, 1995
4. Toward the Sunrising, 1996
5. Secret Place of Thunder, 1996
6. In The Twilight, In The Evening, 1997
7. Island of the Innocent, 1998
8. Driven With the Wind, 2000

=== Omega Trilogy ===
Published by Thomas Nelson. Co-written with her father, Gilbert Morris and brother, Alan Morris.

1. The Beginning Of Sorrows, 1999
2. Fallen Stars, Bitter Waters, 2000
3. Seven Golden Vials, never released

=== Cheney and Shiloh: The Inheritance Series ===
This is a follow-up series to Cheney Duvall, M.D. Also co-written with her father, Gilbert Morris.

Published by Bethany House: "Cheney Duvall is now married to Shiloh, but that doesn't mean life will get any easier. Shiloh's past continues to come back to haunt them, and the couple finds themselves swept up in adventure and excitement as they use their medical skills to help the needy."

1. Where Two Seas Met, 2001
2. The Moon By Night, 2004
3. There is a Season, 2005

=== The Creole Series ===
Published by Thomas Nelson. Co-written with Gilbert Morris.

1. The Exiles, 2003 (also called The Exiles: Chantel)
2. The Immortelles, 2004 (also called The Immortelles: Damita)
3. The Alchemy, 2004 (also called The Alchemy: Simone)
4. The Tapestry, 2005 (also called The Tapestry: Leonie)

=== Standalone books ===
- The Balcony, 1997 from the Portraits Series
- Red & Lowering Sky
