= Lauraine Snelling =

American novelist

Lauraine Snelling is an American author of Christian fiction and has published more than 80 titles since 1982, among them popular historical fiction series revolving around Norwegian immigration and inspired by her own heritage. In 2012, Snelling was inducted into the Scandinavian-American Hall of Fame, a signature event at Norsk Høstfest. Her books have sold more than 5 million copies. Besides writing books and articles, she teaches at writers' conferences across the country. She and her husband make their home in Tehachapi, California.

== List of works by Lauraine Snelling ==
=== Red River of the North series ===
First of the popular Red River/Blessing series. Published by Bethany House. Re-released with new covers in 2007.

1. An Untamed Land, 1996
2. A New Day Rising, 1996
3. A Land To Call Home, 1997
4. The Reaper’s Song, 1998
5. Tender Mercies, 1999
6. Blessing In Disguise, 1999

=== Return To Red River series ===
Second of the popular Red River/Blessing series. Published by Bethany House: "Returning a generation later to the Red River valley and the Bjorklund farm, this series follows the family as the now adult children look to their own future."

1. A Dream To Follow, 2001
2. Believing The Dream, 2002
3. More Than A Dream, 2003

=== Daughters of Blessing series ===
Third in the popular Red River/Blessing series. Published by Bethany House: "returns to North Dakota in 1900 and to favorite characters from the Red River of the North series."

1. A Promise for Ellie, 2006
2. Sophie's Dilemma, 2007
3. A Touch of Grace, 2008
4. Rebecca's Reward, 2008

=== Home to Blessing series ===
Fourth in the popular Red River/Blessing series. Published by Bethany House.

1. A Measure of Mercy, October 1, 2009
2. No Distance Too Far, April 1, 2010
3. A Heart for Home, March 1, 2011

=== Song of Blessing Series ===
Fifth in the popular Red River/Blessing Series. Published by Bethany House.

1. To Everything a Season (October 2014)
2. A Harvest of Hope (March 2015)
3. Streams of Mercy (October 2015)
4. From this Day Forward (October 2016)

=== A Blessing Prequel ===
Set before the events in the Red River of the North Series. Published by Bethany House.

1. An Untamed Heart (October 2013)

=== Dakotah Treasures series ===
Published by Bethany House: "tells the stories of four women surviving and flourishing in the Dakotah territories".

1. Ruby, 2003
2. Pearl, 2004
3. Opal, 2005
4. Amethyst, 2005

=== Secret Refuge series ===
Published by Bethany House: "When the Civil War comes to Kentucky, Jesselynn Highwood is forced to make a fateful decision to save the Thoroughbreds that she promised her dying father she’d protect."

1. Daughter of Twin Oaks, 2000
2. Sisters of the Confederacy, 2000
3. The Long Way Home, 2001

=== Wild West Wind Series ===
1. Valley of Dreams
2. Whispers in the Wind (July 2012)
3. A Place to Belong (March 2013)

=== Under Northern Skies ===
1. A Promise of Dawn (August 2017)
2. A Breath of Hope (April 2018)
3. A Season of Grace (November 2018)
4. A Song of Joy (August 2019)

=== Dakota Plains series ===
Published by Heartsong.

1. Dakota Dawn - Heartsong 28, 1997
2. Dakota Dream - Heartsong 44, 1993
3. Dakota Dusk - Heartsong 66, 1995
4. Dakota December - Heartsong 128

=== Standalone books ===
- Tragedy on the Toutle also released as What about Cimarron, published by Baker Books, 1982
- Song of Laughter - Heartsong 10, 1986
- Race for Roses - Heartsong 350, 1999
- Hawaiian Sunrise, published by Bethany House, 1999
- The Gift, published by Promise Press, 2002
- The Healing Quilt, published by WaterBrook Press, 2002
- The Way of Women, published by WaterBrook Press, 2004
- Saturday Morning, published by WaterBrook Press, 2005
- Washington (Novella with Wanda E. Brunstetter), Published by Barbour Publishing, 2005 - includes Song of Laughter and Race for Roses
- Once Upon A Christmas (Novella with Lenora Worth), Published by Steeple Hill, 2005
- The Brushstroke Legacy, published by WaterBrook Press, 2006
- Breaking Free, published by FaithWords, 2007
- One Perfect Day, 2008
- A Hand to Hold: Helping Someone Through Grief (Non-fiction), published by Revell, 2004
- Reunion, published by FaithWords, 2012
- Wake the Dawn, published by FaithWords, 2013
- Heaven Sent Rain, published by FaithWords, 2014
- Someday Home, published by Faithwords, 2015
- Second Half, published by FaithWords, 2016
- Half Finished, published by FaithWords, 2019

=== Youth fiction ===
==== Golden Filly series ====
1. Golden Filly Collection 1
2. Golden Filly Collection 2

==== High Hurdles series ====
1. High Hurdles Collection 1
2. High Hurdles Collection 2

==== S.A.V.E. Squad series ====
1. Dog Daze
2. The Great Cat Caper
3. Secondhand Horses
4. No Ordinary Owl
