= Primal Doubt =

- Directed by: Yelena Lanskaya
- Written by: Stephen Niver
- Produced by: Brian Gordon; Erik Olson
- Starring: Janine Turner; Costas Mandylor; Maeve Quinlan
- Cinematography: Brian Shanley
- Edited by: Andrew Vona
- Music by: Misha Segal
- Production company: Grand Army Entertainment
- Distributed by: Lifetime Television Network
- Release date: December 5, 2007
- Running time: 90 min.
- Country: United States
- Language: English

Primal Doubt is a 2007 television drama film directed by Yelena Lanskaya, starring Janine Turner and Costas Mandylor.

== Plot summary ==
Former romance author Jean Harper (Turner), who is lonely, signs onto a matchmaking website. Jean agrees to meet her correspondent, but she finds him dead at his home.

== Cast ==
- Janine Turner as Jean Harper
- Adam Scarimbolo as Chase Harper
- Maeve Quinlan as Holly
- William Allen Young as Detective Ben Riggs
- Freda Foh Shen as Detective Maggie Conrad
- Jamie Rose as Dr. Marianne Thorne
- Brittany Ishibashi as Carla
- Amanda Fuller as Claire Harper
- Nick Kiriazis as Travis Freeman
- Rae Ritke as Amanda Freeman
- Emily Warfield as Holly's Assistant
- Monica McSwain as Chase's Assistant
