= Julie Klassen =

American author

- Education: University of Illinois Urbana-Champaign
- Occupation: Writer
- Children: 2 sons
- Writing career
- Language: English
- Period: 2008–present
- Genres: Inspirational, Regency, Romance, Christian Fiction
- Website: www.julieklassen.com

Julie Klassen is an American author of Regency romance novels. She is the winner of several Christy Awards and a Midwest Book Award.

== Education ==
Klassen graduated from the University of Illinois Urbana-Champaign with a bachelor of advertising in 1986.

== Career ==
She worked for 16 years in publishing and recently retired from being an editor at Bethany House Publishers to write full-time.

She submitted the manuscript for her first novel, The Lady of Milkweed Manor, under a pseudonym; only she and her boss knew the identity of the author. She felt this was necessary in order to receive an honest opinion so her fellow editors would not feel obliged to accept it for publication. Klassen also worried about what her colleagues would think of her writing, later saying "I didn't want to be embarrassed when I walked into work the next day". Ultimately, the comments she received were positive and the manuscript was accepted for publication.

Klassen had not traveled to home until the manuscript for her first book was accepted. She was inspired to write about wet nurses after seeing one in a small role in the film The Girl with a Pearl Earring. Curious, she began research on wetnursing. She decided to visit England before her first book was published to make sure she had all her information correct. While there, she stayed in a vicarage in Kent that was used as an inspiration for a location in The Lady of Milkweed Manor (it had been turned into a bed and breakfast). She attended Easter services and met the vicar as well as the people in town. They were interested in her book, and she sent over some copies of the book after it was printed. Also on that trip, she visited the location of a lying-in hospital that was in The Lady of Milkweed Manor (it had burned down) and did research for her next book, The Apothecary's Daughter.

== Awards and honors ==
Klassen won a Minnesota Book Award for her 2014 work, The Secret of Pembrooke Park.

== Published works ==
- Lady of Milkweed Manor (2008)
- The Apothecary's Daughter (2009)
- The Silent Governess (2010)
- The Girl in the Gatehouse (2011)
- The Maid of Fairbourne Hall (2012)
- The Tutor's Daughter (2013)
- The Dancing Master (2014)
- The Secret of Pembrooke Park (2014)
- Lady, Maybe (2015)
- The Painter's Daughter (2015)
- The Innkeeper of Ivy Hill (2016)
- The Ladies of Ivy Cottage (2017)
- The Bride of Ivy Green (2018)
- The Bridge to Belle Island (2019)
- An Ivy Hill Christmas (2020)
- A Castaway in Cornwall (2020)
- Shadows of Swanford Abbey (2021)
- The Sisters of Sea View (2022)
- A Winter by the Sea (2023)
- The Seaside Homecoming (2024)
- A Seaview Christmas (2025)
- Whispers at Painswick Court (2025)
