= Krista McGee =

American novelist

Krista McGee (born in Memphis, Tennessee) is an American young adult Christian fiction author and educator.

== Bibliography ==
=== Anomaly ===
1. Anomaly (2013)
2. Luminary (2014)
3. Revolutionary (2014)

=== Other novels ===
- First Date (2012)
- Starring Me (2012)
- Right Where I Belong (2012)
