= Joyce Fox =

American Christian fiction writer

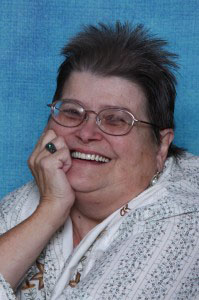
- Joyce Fox, columnist & author
- Born: Joyce Fox
- Occupation: Writer
- Children: 1 son (deceased), 1 daughter
- Writing career
- Language: English
- Genres: Christian, historical fiction, mystery
- Website: www.slavetograce.com

Joyce Fox is a Christian fiction author. She authored Slave to Grace, published in 2013 by DocUmeant Publishing and numerous articles published in various periodicals. She has lived in Michigan, Ohio, Indiana, Illinois, Tennessee, North Carolina, and Arkansas. Fox was awarded the Michigan People's Choice Award for Favorite Reporter in the Capital City Area by Lansing Community Newspapers.

== Work ==
She worked as a reporter and wrote multiple articles for the Grundy County Herald of Tracy City, Tennessee (2000); the Southwest Times Record of Fort Smith, Arkansas (2001); the Holt Community Paper of Holt, Michigan (2001–2002); the Breese Journal of Breese, Illinois (2002- 2005) and the Macomb Journal (later called the McDonough County Voice) of Macomb, Illinois (2006 -2007).

Some of her articles are: " 'Between Friends' Robbery nets Jail, Trial for Two Centralians" (Breese paper); "Man faces prison in new burglary charges" (Macomb Journal); "Former Mater Dei Educator, Coach Declares for New 107th House District" (Breese paper); a regular humor column in the Breese Journal called, "With a Little Help..."; "Making Christ Known by Making a Difference" one of the Preacher Features in the Macomb Journal.

Joyce is retired from TriStates Public Radio WIUM/WIUW of Macomb, Illinois, and has spent many years working as a volunteer with the Salvation Army. Joyce now resides in Cleveland, Tennessee. where she is currently studying for licensure in clinical mental health at the Pentecostal Theological Seminary.

== Published works ==
- Slave to Grace published by DocUmeant Publishing
- Grace Upon Grace published by DocUmeant Publishing

== Published in publications ==
- War Cry magazine
- Cleveland Daily Banner; Lifestlyles 4 April 2013
- Southwest Times Record
- Newspapers in Tennessee, Arkansas, Michigan and Illinois

== Awards ==
- Michigan People's Choice Award for Favorite Reporter in the Capital City Area
