= Hidden Places =

2006 television film by Yelena Lanskaya

- Based on: Hidden Places by Lynn Austin
- Teleplay by: Robert Tate Miller
- Directed by: Yelena Lanskaya
- Starring: Sydney Penny; Jason Gedrick; Barry Corbin; Tom Bosley; Shirley Jones
- Music by: Roger Bellon
- Country of origin: United States
- Original language: English

Production
- Executive producers: Larry Levinson; Robert Halmi Jr.
- Producers: Albert T. Dickerson III; Jeff Kloss
- Cinematography: James W. Wrenn
- Editor: Jan Popiden
- Running time: 86 minutes
- Production companies: Hallmark Entertainment; Alpine Medien Productions; Larry Levinson Productions

Original release
- Network: Hallmark Channel
- Release: January 28, 2006

Hidden Places is a 2006 American romantic drama television film directed by Yelena Lanskaya from a teleplay by Robert Tate Miller, based on the 2001 novel of the same name by Lynn Austin. It stars Sydney Penny and Jason Gedrick, with Barry Corbin, Tom Bosley, and Shirley Jones in supporting roles. It follows a widowed mother who must bring in the harvest before the bank forecloses on her family's home.

The film premiered on Hallmark Channel on January 28, 2006. Jones was nominated for a Primetime Emmy Award and a Screen Actors Guild Award for her performance.

== Plot ==
In the early 1930s, Eliza Wyatt is left to run the family orange orchard while raising her two children, Luke and Betty, after her husband Frank dies of a heart attack. With foreclosure approaching, she withdraws the children from school to help harvest the orange crop. Frank's sister, Aunt Batty, moves in to homeschool them and assist with the farm. A drifter named Gabriel Harper arrives seeking work and is hired to help with the harvest in exchange for food and lodging. His efforts enable the family to complete the crop within thirty days and prevent the bank from taking the property. As Eliza learns more about his past through his personal journal, she develops feelings for him.

== Cast ==
- Sydney Penny as Eliza Wyatt
- Jason Gedrick as Gabe Harper
- Shirley Jones as Aunt Batty
- Logan Arens as Luke Wyatt
- Carlie Westerman as Becky Wyatt
- Barry Corbin as Sheriff John Doggins
- Tom Bosley as Wakefield
- Eugene M. Davis as Tom Walker
- Jane Fleiss as Marion Walker
- John Diehl as Frank Wyatt
- Time Winters as Mr. Kornhaus
- James Keane as Mr. Jennings

== Reception ==
=== Accolades ===
Year	Award	Category	Recipient	Result	Ref(s).
2006	Primetime Emmy Awards	Outstanding Supporting Actress in a Miniseries or a Movie	Shirley Jones	Nominated	
2007	Screen Actors Guild Awards	Outstanding Performance by a Female Actor in a Miniseries or Television Movie	Shirley Jones	Nominated	
2007	Movieguide Awards	Most Inspiring Performance in Television	Shirley Jones	Won	
