= T. Davis Bunn =

American author (born 1952)

- Born: 1952 (age 73–74); North Carolina, U.S.
- Education: Wake Forest University (BA); Gresham College (MSc)
- Occupation: Novelist
- Spouse: Isabella Bunn
- Writing career
- Pen name: Davis Bunn; Thomas Locke
- Language: English
- Period: 1990-present
- Genres: Historical fiction, legal thriller
- Notable awards: 4 Christy Awards
- Website: www.kensingtonbooks.com/author/davis-bunn

T. Davis Bunn (born 1952) is an American author. He grew up in North Carolina and earned his BA from Wake Forest University in 1974, in psychology and economics, before moving to London to study for an M.Sc. in international finance and economics at the Gresham College. He became a consultant and lecturer in international finance and worked in Switzerland and Germany. Bunn and his wife now live in Oxford, UK, where his wife is on faculty at Regent's Park College, Oxford University. He is Novelist in Residence at the same college. When not in Oxford, he lives in Florida.

Bunn is a writer of historical fiction and legal thrillers, in which Christian faith plays a major part. He has written novels together with Canadian author Janette Oke, and others with his wife Isabella. Bunn has begun publishing using the name Davis Bunn. Bunn has also used the pseudonym Thomas Locke. He has won a Christy Award four times. His books are published by Bethany House and worldwide by several local publishers.

== Bibliography ==
=== Novels series ===
==== T.J. Case Series ====
1. The Presence (1990)
2. Promises to Keep (1991)

==== Priceless Collection ====
1. Florian's Gate (1992)
2. The Amber Room (1992)
3. Winter Palace (1993)

==== Rendezvous With Destiny ====
1. Rhineland Inheritance (1993)
2. Gibraltar Passage (1994)
3. Sahara Crosswind (1992)
4. Berlin Encounter (1995)
5. Istanbul Express (1995)
6. In the Shadows of Victory (1998)--Books 1-3 bound in one volume
7. A Passage Through Darkness (2000)--Books 4-5 bound in one volume

==== Reluctant Prophet ====
1. The Warning (1998)
2. The Ultimatum (1999)

==== Song of Acadia (with Janette Oke) ====
1. The Meeting Place (1999)
2. The Sacred Shore (2000)
3. The Birthright (2001)
4. The Distant Beacon (2002)
5. The Beloved Land (2002)

==== Marcus Glenwood Series ====
1. The Great Divide (2000)
2. Drummer in the Dark (2001)
3. Winner Take All (2003)

==== Heirs of Acadia ====
1. The Solitary Envoy (2004), with Isabella Bunn
2. The Innocent Libertine (2004)
3. The Noble Fugitive (2005)
4. The Night Angel (2006), with Isabella Bunn
5. Falconer's Quest (2007), with Isabella Bunn

==== Premier Mystery Series ====
1. The Lazarus Trap (2005)
2. Imposter (2006)

==== Storm Syrrell Adventure Series ====
1. Gold of Kings (2009)
2. The Black Madonna (2010)

==== Acts of Faith series with Janette Oke ====
1. The Centurion's Wife (2009)
2. The Hidden Flame (2010)
3. The Damascus Way (2011)

==== Marc Royce Adventures ====
1. Lion of Babylon (2011)
2. Rare earth (2012)
3. Strait of Hormuz (2013)

==== Island of Time series ====
1. Island of Time (2022)
2. Forbidden (2023)

==== Miramar Bay Series ====
1. Miramar Bay (2017)
2. Firefly Cove (2018)
3. Moondust Lake (2018)
4. Tranquility Falls (2020)
5. The Cottage on Lighthouse Lane (2021)
6. The Emerald Tide (2022)
7. The Christmas Hummingbird (2022)
8. Shell Beach (2023)
9. Midnight Harbor (2024)

=== Other novels ===
- The Maestro (1991)
- The Quilt (1992)
- Dangerous Devices (1993)
- Riders of the Pale Horse (1994)
- The Gift (1994)
- Light and Shadow (1995)
- The Messenger (1995)
- The Music Box (1996)
- Return to Harmony (1996), with Janette Oke
- Another Homecoming (1997), with Janette Oke
- Deadly Games (1997)
- Tidings of Comfort and Joy (1997)
- One Shenandoah Winter (1998)
- Princess Bella and the Red Velvet Hat (1998)
- Tomorrow's Dream (1998), with Janette Oke
- The Book of Hours (2000)
- Kingdom Come (2001), with Larry Burkett
- Elixir (2004)
- Heartland (2006)
- My Soul to Keep (2007)
- Full Circle (2008)
- All Through the Night (2008)
- Book of Dreams (2012)
- Prayers of a Stranger (2012)
- Unlimited (2013)
- The Turning (2014)
- The Sign Painter (2014)
- The Patmos Deception (2014)
- The Pilgrim (2015)
- The Fragment (2016)
- The Domino Effect (2016)
- Unscripted (2019)
- Outbreak (2019)
- Burden of Proof (2020)
- Prime Directive (2021)
- The Rowan (2023)
- No Man's Land (2024)

=== As Thomas Locke ===
- The Delta Factor (1994)
- The Omega Network (1995)
- To the Ends of the Earth: A Novel of the Byzantine Empire (1996)
- The Aqaba Exchange (1996)
- One False Move (1997)
- Enclave (2018)
- Fortune's Favor (2022), with Jyoti Guptara
- Roulette (2023), with Jyoti Guptara

==== The Spectrum Chronicles ====
- Light Weaver (1994)
- Dream Voyager (1995)
- Path Finder (1995)
- Heart Chaser (1997)

==== Legends of the Realm ====
- 1. Emissary (2014)
- 2. Merchant of Alyss (2016)
- The Captive (2014) [short story]
- 3. The Golden Vial (2018)

==== Fault Lines ====
- 1. Fault Lines (2017)
- 2. Trial Run (2015)
- 3. Flash Point (2016)

==== Recruits ====
- 1. Recruits (2017)
- 2. Renegades (2017)
