= Yelena Lanskaya =

American director, producer and editor

- Occupations: Film director, producer, editor

Yelena Lanskaya is an American director, producer and editor. She is an active member of Directors Guild of America, the Motion Picture Editors Guild and Academy of Television Arts & Sciences.

Yelena has directed movies such as The Santa Incident, The Colt, Hidden Places, Hybrid, Primal Doubt, and series Law & Order: SVU, among others. She has co-produced and edited a theatrical musical First Love: It's The Music!, produced by Sony, CTC Media, Alexander Rodnyansky, and Bill Borden and Barry Rosenbush, the producers of High School Musical.

The movies she has directed earned numerous awards at film festivals around the world and in America. Oscar-winning actress Shirley Jones has been nominated for Emmy Awards and SAG Awards for starring in Yelena's film Hidden Places. Hidden Places received The CAMIE Award 2007 and the Grace Award of MovieGuide Awards 2007. Writer Stephen Harrigan has WGA Awards and Humanitas Prize nominations for The Colt. Her films have been highly acclaimed by critics and press such as The New York Times Two of her movies became the 2nd and the 17th most-watched telecasts in the history of the Hallmark Channel. Her movies are shown in 122 countries in 35 languages.

She is working with companies such as Columbia TriStar/Sony Pictures Entertainment, ABC, CBS, NBC, TNT, Warner Bros. Pictures, Hallmark Entertainment, Hallmark Hall of Fame, Lifetime, Sci Fi, Bill Borden & Barry Rosenbush Entertainment and the independent film companies.

Yelena has studied film in AFI Conservatory (American Film Institute). In addition, she has won participation in a highly prestigious grant program Directing Workshop for Women at American Film Institute. Lanskaya has a bachelor's degree in performance (piano) and has toured with the chamber orchestras and her rock band. At the same time, Yelena worked as a TV and print journalist.

Yelena Lanskaya lives in Los Angeles.
