= Lynn Austin =

American author (born 1949)

- Born: 1949 (age 76–77)
- Education: Hope College; Southern Connecticut State University
- Occupation: Writer
- Spouse: Ken
- Children: 3 children
- Writing career
- Language: English
- Period: 1992–present
- Genres: Inspirational, Historical, Romance, Biblical fiction
- Website: www.lynnaustin.org

Lynn Austin (born 1949) is the American author of many Christian fiction novels and holds the record for most Christy Awards won: eight. One of her books, Hidden Places was turned into a Hallmark Channel movie. She and her husband have three children and live in Holland, Michigan.

== Background ==
Austin began her writing career as a reader. She did not like the feeling of hopelessness she was often left with and sought to write what she would want to read. "I agree that life is hard--but God is good!" With only a minor in English she sat down to write, and continued to write, while juggling in between raising her children and working part-time. Her family moved from Canada to Chicago, where she taught at Chicago Christian High School one year before beginning to write full-time and actively pursued getting published. It took eleven years from when she started writing to getting published.

== Writing philosophy ==
Austin is known for writing books about strong women that don't need to be rescued by a hero. She responded to readers about this by stating, "Although I don't consciously set out to create strong women, I'd like to think that the women in my stories find strength by trusting in God."

She says she never starts a story with a particular theme in mind, but rather starts by trying to tell a story and let the Christian message fall into place. The theme of the books may be different, but the central message she tries to get across in all her novels is "that God loves us and He'll never forsake us no matter how difficult life becomes."

"I love to draw my inspiration from the lives of real people," she says. She does this by peppering her research of historic events with diaries, letters, and first-hand accounts of people who lived through these events and times. She also gets inspiration from listening to stories about and from modern people.

== Published works ==
=== Series ===
==== Chronicles of the Kings ====
- Gods and Kings (originally published The Lord Is My Strength) (1995)
- Song of Redemption (originally published The Lord Is My Song) (1996)
- The Strength of His Hand (originally published The Lord Is My Salvation) (1996)
- Faith of My Fathers (originally published My Father's God) (1997)
- Among the Gods (1998)

==== Refiner's Fire ====
- Candle in the Darkness (2002) Christy Award winner
- Fire By Night (2003) Christy Award winner
- A Light to My Path (2004)

==== The Restoration Chronicles ====
- Return to Me (2013)
- Keepers of the covenant (2014)
- On This Foundation (due out October 2015)

=== Stand alone novels ===
- Fly Away (2017)
- Eve's Daughters (1999)
- Wings of Refuge (2000)
- Hidden Places (2001) Christy Award winner
- All She Ever Wanted (2005)
- A Woman's Place (2006)
- A Proper Pursuit (2007) Christy Award winner
- Until We Reach Home (2008) Christy Award winner
- Though Waters Roar (2009) Christy Award winner
- While We're Far Apart (2010) Christy Award winner
- Wonderland Creek (2011) Christy Award winner
- All Things New (2012)
- Waves of Mercy (2016)
- Where We Belong (2017)
- Legacy of Mercy (2018)
- If I Were You (2020)
- The Wish Book Christmas (2021)
- Chasing Shadows (2021)
- Long Way Home (2022)
- All My Secrets (2024)
- Waiting for Christmas (2024)

=== Nonfiction ===
- Pilgrimage: My Journey to a Deeper Faith in the Land Where Jesus Walked (2013)
- Sightings: Discovering God's Presence in our Everyday Moments (2019)
