= Tracie Peterson =

American novelist

Tracie Peterson (born 1959) is an American author of Christian fiction. Often called the “Queen of Historical Christian Fiction", she writes many historical novels, with romantic and Christian faith-based themes in them. She has co-written with a variety of Christian authors on joint novels.

Many of her books are published by Bethany House. She originally used the pen name of Janelle Jamison.

Several of her series feature Harvey Girls, who are historically part of the Fred Harvey Company.

Peterson is married to Jim and has three children, Jennifer, Julie, and Erik; they live in Montana.

Peterson owns Peterson Ink, Inc. along with her husband Jim. Barbour Publishing used Peterson Ink to handle the entire production of their Heartsong Presents book line. Heartsong Presents published 52 Christian romance books a year, with half of those being contemporary stories and half historical.

== List of works ==
=== Ribbons of Steel series ===
written with Judith Pella and published by Bethany House

1. Distant Dreams, 1997
2. A Hope Beyond, 1997
3. A Promise for Tomorrow, 1998

=== Ribbons West series ===
written with Judith Pella

1. Westward the Dream, 1999
2. Separate Roads, 1999
3. Ties that Bind, 2000

This is a continuation to the Ribbons of Steel series.

=== Westward Chronicles series ===
published by Bethany House. This series featured the Harvey Girls in each book.

1. A Shelter of Hope, 1998
2. Hidden in a Whisper, 1999
3. A Veiled Reflection, 2000

This series was repackaged in 2005 by the publisher.

=== Shannon Saga series ===
Written with James Scott Bell and published by Bethany House. The story of Kit Shannon, a lawyer, in Los Angeles in the 20th century.

1. City of Angels, 2001
2. Angels Flight, 2001
3. Angel of Mercy, 2002

=== Yukon Quest series ===
Published by Bethany House: "The late 1800s offered the brave and the desperate an opportunity to flee the world they'd known for the lure of gold in the vast expanses of Alaska."

1. Treasures of the North, 2001
2. Ashes and Ice, 2001
3. Rivers of Gold, 2002

=== Desert Roses series ===
Published by Bethany House: "Delight in the Intrigue and Romance of the Harvey Girls of the Old West"

1. Shadows of the Canyon, 2002
2. Across the Years, 2003
3. Beneath a Harvest Sky, 2003

=== Bells of Lowell series ===
Written with Judith Miller, published by Bethany House: "Bringing the late 19th-century mill town of Lowell, Massachusetts, to life in a fascinating slice of history."

1. Daughter of the Loom, 2003
2. A Fragile Design, 2003
3. These Tangled Threads, 2003

=== Lights of Lowell series ===
Written with Judith Miller, published by Bethany House: "Courage, faith, and love are at the heart of this moving saga of a young woman’s stand for what she knows is right."

1. A Tapestry of Hope, 2004
2. A Love Woven True, 2005
3. The Pattern of her Heart, 2005

=== Heirs of Montana series ===
Published by Bethany House: "a one-of-a-kind portrait of 1860s Montana and the strong, spirited men and women who dared to call it home."

1. Land of my Heart, 2004
2. The Coming Storm, 2004
3. To Dream Anew, 2004
4. The Hope Within, 2005

=== Alaskan Quest series ===
Published by Bethany House: "a captivating cast of characters struggles to survive in America's final frontier. The adventure begins when the quiet lives of siblings Jacob and Leah Barringer are interrupted by a familiar face from the past and a stranger with a mysterious mission."

1. Summer of the Midnight Sun, 2006
2. Under the Northern Lights, 2006
3. Whispers of the Winter, 2006

This series continues a focus on the characters from the Yukon Quest series.

=== Ladies of Liberty series ===
Published by Bethany House: "centered in the bustling, energetic city of Philadelphia; each book an independent read, these novels will feature winsom heroines engaged in unusual careers for the time"

1. A Lady of High Regard, 2007
2. A Lady of Hidden Intent, 2008
3. A Lady of Secret Devotion, 2008

=== Broadmoor Legacy series ===
Written with Judith Miller, published by Bethany House: "a heart-stirring series featuring three young women searching for love and a legacy the 1890s."

1. A Daughter's Inheritance, 2008
2. An Unexpected Love, 2008
3. A Surrendered Heart, 2009

=== Brides of Gallatin County series ===
Published by Bethany House: "the story of three sisters running a roadhouse in the Montana Territory"

1. A Promise to Believe In, 2008
2. A Love to Last Forever, 2009
3. A Dream to Call My Own, 2009

=== Song of Alaska series ===
Published by Bethany House

1. Dawn's Prelude, 2009
2. Morning's Refrain, 2010
3. Twilight's Serenade, 2010

=== Bridal Veil Island Series ===
1. To Have and to Hold (with Judith Miller)
2. To Love and Cherish (with Judith Miller)
3. To Honor and Trust (with Judith Miller)

=== Land of the Lone Star Series ===
1. Chasing the Sun, 2012
2. Touching the Sky, 2012
3. Taming the Wind, 2012

=== Land of Shining Water – from Bethany House ===
1. The Icecutter’s Daughter (2013)
2. The Quarryman’s Bride (2013)
3. The Miner’s Lady (2013)

=== Lone Star Brides – from Bethany House ===
1. A Sensible Arrangement (2014)
2. A Moment in Time (2014)
3. A Matter of Heart (2014)

Lone Star Brides – Books 1-3 (2015)

=== Sapphire Brides Series – from Bethany House ===
1. A Treasure Concealed (2016)
2. A Beauty Refined (2016)
3. A Love Transformed (2016)

=== Golden Gate Secrets – from Bethany House ===
1. In Places Hidden Book 1 (2018)
2. In Dreams Forgotten Book 2 (2018)
3. In Times Gone By Book 3 (2018)

=== Brookstone Brides Series – from Bethany House ===
1. When You Are Near Book 1 (2019)
2. Wherever You Go Book 2 (2019)
3. What Comes My Way Book 3 (2019)

=== Brides of Seattle Series – from Bethany House ===
1. Steadfast Heart (2015)
2. Refining Fire (2015)
3. Love Everlasting (2015)

=== The Heart of Alaska Series – from Bethany House ===
1. In the Shadow of Denali (2017)
2. Out of the Ashes (2018)
3. Under the Midnight Sun (2019)

=== Heart of the Frontier Series – from Bethany House ===
1. Treasured Grace (2017)
2. Beloved Hope (2017)
3. Cherished Mercy (2017)

=== Standalone books ===
- Entangled, published by Bethany House, 1997
- Framed, published by Bethany House, 1998
- Seasons of Love, published by Barbour Publishing, 1998
- Alaska, published by Barbour Publishing, 1998
- Controlling Interests, published by Bethany House, 1998
- Celebration of Life, published by Barbour Publishing, 1999
- A Slender Thread, published by Bethany House, 2000
- Tidings of Peace, published by Bethany House, 2000
- Colorado Wings, published by Barbour Publishing, 2000
- Kansas, with Judith McCoy Miller and published by Barbour Publishing, 2001
- The Long-awaited Child, published by Bethany House, 2001
- New Mexico Sunset, published by Barbour Publishing, 2001
- New Mexico Sunrise, published by Barbour Publishing, 2001
- Julotta, 2002
- Eyes of the Heart (nonfiction), published by Bethany House, 2002
- Silent Star, published by Bethany House, 2003
- Castles, published by Barbour Publishing, 2004
- What She Left for Me, published by Bethany House, 2005
- I Can't Do It All, with Allison Bottke and Dianne O'Brian, published by Bethany House, 2006
- One More Sunrise , with Michael Landon Jr. and published by Bethany House, 2007
- Where My Heart Belongs, published by Bethany House, 2007

==== Heartsong Presents books ====
These are standalone Christian Romance novels from the Heartsong Presents company.

- A Place to Belong (Heartsong 19) as Janelle Jamison
- If Given a Choice (Heartsong 102)
- A Kingdom Divided (Heartsong 111), 1995
- The Hearts Calling (Heartsong 116)
- Forever Yours (Heartsong 127)
- Angel's Cause (Heartsong 140)
- Alas My Love (Heartsong 164)
- A Wing and a Prayer (Heartsong 182), 1996
- Wings Like Eagles (Heartsong 186)
- Come Away, My Love (Heartsong 195), 1996
- If Only (Heartsong 200)
- My Valentine (Heartsong 211)
- Wings of the Dawn, (Heartsong 226), 1997
- Logan's Lady, (Heartsong 239), 1997
- Crossroads, (Heartsong 245), 1997
- The House on Windridge (Heartsong 287), 1998
- Five Geese Flying (Heartsong 259), 1998

Heartsong Book Collection

- An Old Fashion Christmas - 4 short stories, one of them is by Tracie Peterson
