= Dawn Batterbee Miller =

American writer

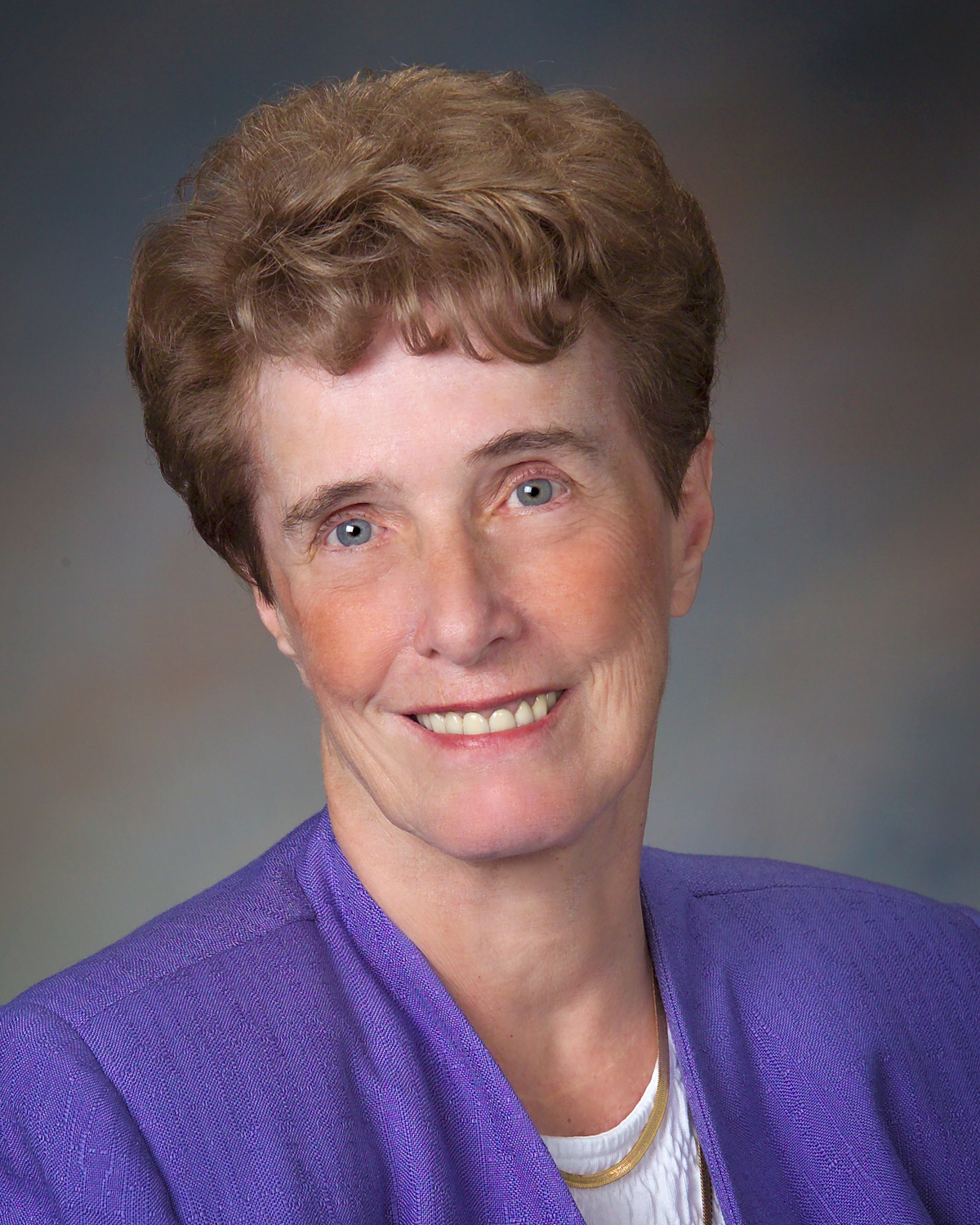
- Born: Dawn Miller
- Education: Michigan State University
- Occupation: Writer
- Children: 5 children, 3 girls & 2 boys
- Writing career
- Language: English
- Genres: Inspirational, Christian, Romance, Mystery
- Website: dawncreations.net

Dawn Batterbee Miller is an author. She authored God's Family Tree, published in 1994 by Church Growth Institute and numerous articles published worldwide in various Christian periodicals. For several years she served as editor and publisher of Women in Ministry, a denominational women's paper. She is also a retired public school teacher and holds master's degrees in education and communication arts, with the Master of Arts in communication from Michigan State University.

Her work has appeared in several publications including, Guidepost, World Vision, Focus on the Family, Christian Communicator, Cook Communications Ministries, Standard Publishing, and others.

== Selected works ==
- God's Family Tree published by Church Growth Inst.
- Pioneer Potpourri published by DocUmeant Publishing

=== Deep Wood Series ===
- Footprints Under the Pines by WinePress
- 2nd Edition by DocUmeant Publishing
- Lost in the Deep Woods by WinePress
- 2nd Edition by DocUmeant Publishing
