= Bethany House =

US book publishing company

- Parent company: Baker Publishing Group
- Founded: 1966
- Country of origin: United States
- Headquarters location: Bloomington, Minnesota
- Official website: www.bethanyhouse.com

Bethany House Publishers is a publisher that publishes Christian fiction and non-fiction books. Bethany House Publishers was bought in 2003 by Baker Publishing Group.

Bethany House publishes both historical and contemporary fiction. Historical fiction is considered any book that is set prior to 1950. Contemporary fiction is defined as any book which is set in the last fifty years. Bethany House also publishes nonfiction, covering a broad spectrum of issues relevant to Christianity.

== Stats ==
Bethany House has published over 1,000 books. They publish 120 books per year.

== Awards ==
Bethany House Publishers has received thirty-three Gold or Platinum awards. They have also won twenty-two Christy Awards since the award's inception in 2000.

== Notable authors ==
Sorted alphabetically.

- Stephen Arterburn
- Lynn Austin
- Jim Burns
- T. Davis Bunn
- Anne de Graaf
- Marie Chapian
- Wayne Cordeiro
- Mary Connealy
- Peter Greer
- Dee Henderson
- T.D. Jakes
- Julie Klassen
- Lois Gladys Leppard
- Beverly Lewis
- TobyMac
- Michael A. O'Donnell
- Janette Oke
- Robin Parrish
- Judith Pella
- Tracie Peterson
- Leonard Ravenhill
- Lauraine Snelling
- James White
