= Christianbook =

Christian catalog and internet retailer

Christianbook, LLC
- Formerly: Christian Book Distributors
- Company type: Private company
- Industry: Christian retail
- Founded: 1978
- Headquarters: Peabody, Massachusetts
- Key people: Ray Hendrickson, President & CEO
- Products: Books, Bibles, DVDs, CDs, mp3s, gifts, toys, games
- Number of employees: 500+
- Website: www.christianbook.com

Christianbook, LLC, formerly known as Christian Book Distributors (CBD), is a Christian catalog and internet retailer.

Christian Book Distributors was started in 1978 by Stephen Hendrickson, 19 years old and a sophomore at Central Bible College in Springfield, Missouri, out of his parents’ home in Lynn, Massachusetts. Stephen Hendrickson incorporated the business, first as a nonprofit, and subsequently as a for profit corporation on September 10, 1981.

In 1984 the company built a 24,000-square-foot (2,200 m^{2}) facility in the Centennial Industrial Park in Peabody. By 1996 CBD had completely outgrown the site and built a new facility across the street, where it remains today. The facility is now 300,000 square feet (28,000 m^{2}). In 2012, CBD was described as employing a staff of just over 500 while "[continuing] to be a family affair", with its younger co-founder, his 80-year-old mother and his 23-year-old son "still involved with the company".

CBD was selected by The Boston Globe as one of the Top 100 Places to Work in Massachusetts five years running from 2009 to 2013.

== History ==
In August 2004 Ray Hendrickson replaced Stephen Hendrickson as President/CEO.

In 2008 CBD announced it had entered into a partnership agreement with Focus on the Family to take over the ministry's e-commerce site and product distribution. The partnership took effect early 2009. In June 2019, Christian Book Distributors changed its name to Christianbook, Inc. due to confusion with CBD, a chemical from cannabis.
