= Baker Publishing Group =

American Christian book publisher

- Status: Active
- Founded: 1939
- Founder: Herman Baker
- Country of origin: United States
- Headquarters location: Ada, Michigan
- Distribution: Self-distributed (US); Parasource Marketing & Distribution (Canada); CUM Books (South Africa); Lion Hudson (UK); SPCK (Baker Academic and Brazos, UK)
- Imprints: Bethany House, Revell, Baker Books, Baker Academic, Chosen, and Brazos Press
- Official website: bakerpublishinggroup.com

Baker Publishing Group is a Christian publisher that produces books on theology, Christian living, historical topics, and fiction, primarily for an evangelical readership. It is based in Ada, Michigan, and has six subdivisions: Bethany House, Revell, Baker Books, Baker Academic, Chosen, and Brazos Press.

== History ==
The company was founded in 1939 by Herman Baker in Grand Rapids, Michigan. The company mainly publishes content that covers many issues ranging from family life to theology, mostly within a broad evangelical framework.

Baker acquired the Revell Company in 1992.

Furthermore, Baker also publishes books and ministry resources for pastors and church leaders, concentrating on topics such as preaching, worship, pastoral ministries, counseling and leadership. Apart from that, they also publish content for lay Christians on topics such as discipleship, spirituality, encouragement, relationships, marriage, parenting and the intersection of Christianity and culture.

In June 2014, Baker Publishing Group announced that it had acquired the publishing rights for Regal Books from Gospel Light.

== Subdivisions ==
=== Bethany House ===
Baker is regarded as a "pioneer" in publishing Christian fiction.

=== Revell ===
The Fleming H. Revell Company was established in 1870 by Christian Evangelist Dwight L. Moody and his brother-in-law, Fleming H. Revell. The two men identified a market for practical books that would help bring the Christian faith to everyday life. In 1992, Revell was absorbed by Baker.

=== Chosen ===
The Chosen publishing enterprise began in 1971. In 1985, the company was absorbed into the Revell publishing Group. When Revell was bought by Baker, the Chosen imprint remained as a distinct unit within the newly expanded company.

=== Brazos Press ===
Brazos Press is a publisher of theology and theologically based cultural criticism with an orientation toward postliberal viewpoints within mainline Protestantism.
