= CBA (Christian trade association) =

US-based trade association

CBA: The Association for Christian Retail
- Formation: 1950
- Purpose: Collaboration between Christian retailers, suppliers, authors, artists, ministries, and media
- Headquarters: Colorado Springs, Colorado
- President: Curtis Riskey
- Formerly called: Christian Booksellers Association

CBA (formerly known as the Christian Booksellers Association), subtitled "The Association for Christian Retail since 1950", is a trade association that was established in 1950.

== History ==
The association was first organized by 219 Christian bookstores and, by 2011, had grown to include 1700 stores. The number of member stores expanded considerably in the 1990s with the rise of online shopping. Bill Anderson is president of the association and Curtis Riskey is executive director. By 2014, CBA had discontinued its winter trade fair in response to the closing of many of the association's member stores.

CBA has guidelines for books sold by its member stores to prohibit offensive content including profanity, alcohol consumption, and references to luck. When a significant minority of customers at CBA's member stores take offense to a book, CBA pressures all member stores to stop selling books by that book's publisher. CBA purchases films from Pure Flix Entertainment.
