= Evangelical Christian Publishers Association =

Christian publisher

The Evangelical Christian Publishers Association (ECPA) is an international non-profit trade association whose member companies are involved in the publishing and distribution of Christian content worldwide.

ECPA was cofounded by Hugh Revell Barbour and his brother Bill through a partnership with Christian publishers and has operated since 1974, with what the organization describes as a focus on "building networking, information, and advocacy opportunities within the industry".

Since 1978, ECPA has presented the annual Christian Book Awards (formerly Gold Medallion Book Awards) in several categories, including Christian Book of the Year. ECPA also presents the annual Christy Awards for Christian Fiction, the Top Shelf Awards recognizing book design excellence, and the industry's Milestone Sales Awards.

In 2021, ECPA created a Diversity & Inclusion Standing Committee and hired Jeff Crosby as president and CEO to succeed Stan Jantz.

Programs and services ECPA provides include Christian bestseller lists, and a weekly news publication, Rush to Press, that recaps industry news.
