= Christian novel =

Literary genre

Christian novels are a genre of novels in the tradition of Christian literature, written as a work of fiction focusing on religious events and worldviews.

== The tradition of Christian fiction ==
Christian novels are works of imaginative literature drawing on Christian themes, theology, and social norms. The European Christian literary tradition dates back centuries, and draws on past Christian allegorical literature, such as Dante Alighieri's Divine Comedy and John Bunyan's The Pilgrim's Progress and The Holy War. Twentieth century proponents of the Christian novel in English include J.R.R. Tolkien, G. K. Chesterton, Robert Hugh Benson, C.S. Lewis, and Madeleine L'Engle. Aslan in Lewis' The Lion, the Witch and the Wardrobe allegorically represents Christ, for example, while L'Engle's A Live Coal in the Sea explicitly references the medieval allegorical poem Piers Plowman.

Many novels with Christian themes also fall into specific mainstream fiction genres. For example, J.R.R. Tolkien's The Lord of the Rings is viewed as mainstream fantasy, while Julian May's Galactic Milieu Series is viewed as mainstream science fiction, in spite of the references to the work of Jesuit priest Pierre Teilhard de Chardin. Similarly, G. K. Chesterton's Father Brown stories are mainstream detective fiction, even though the main character is a Catholic priest.

== Modern American Christian novels ==
In the last few centuries the existence of a conservative Christian subculture, particularly in North America, has given rise to a specific genre of Christian novel. Books such as Love Comes Softly by Janette Oke (1979) and This Present Darkness by Frank Peretti (1985), combining a specific brand of conservative Christian theology with a popular romance or thriller form, have gained approval in the subculture, just as in earlier times Ben-Hur: A Tale of the Christ helped make the novel acceptable to conservative religious people of the day. Publication of such Christian novels has increased greatly from this beginning, and excellence in the genre is now recognised by the Christy Awards, although an article in Christianity Today recently argued that such use of popular forms risks "foisting on the world impoverished - even laughable - expressions of those genres."

In North America, the Christian novel has evolved into a specific genre of its own, written explicitly by and for Christians of a particular type. Such a Christian novel does not have to involve an actual event or character in Bible history. A novel can be Christian in this sense merely because one of its characters either comes to a Christian understanding of God and of man's need for salvation from sin, or faces a crisis of his or her faith. Nor does the plot need to turn on whether any given character is a Christian or not - although many Christian novels do have plots that explicitly reference persecution (in the past, the present, or the future), Bible history, or unfulfilled prophecy (as in the immensely popular Left Behind series). Popular authors of Christian novels include Francine Rivers in the romance subgenre, and Ted Dekker and Robert Liparulo in the thriller/suspense subgenre.

Other authors of Christian novels include Karen Kingsbury, Judith McCoy Miller, Kristena Mears, Tracie Peterson, Bethany Kennedy Scanlon, Tosca Lee and Robert Whitlow. Some authors of Christian novels have received a mixed reception within the conservative Christian community. William P. Young's best-selling theological novel The Shack, for example, was strongly criticised by some reviewers. American writer Sue Monk Kidd interrogated Christian religion through the lens of feminist theology throughout her work, depicting a direct reinterpretation of the life of Jesus in The Book of Longings (2020).

Deborah Bryan of the Kansas Library Association suggests that this genre of books typically promotes values, teaches a lesson, always has a happy ending (good prevails over evil in all books), adheres to a decency code (certain boundaries such as sexuality, strong language, and topics of such cannot be crossed), and that Christian fiction is created for defined boundaries within a particular community. She also notes that a Christian fiction writer must comply with certain restraints such as:

1. Accept the truthful authority of the Bible
2. Address dilemmas through faith in Jesus
3. Believe that Jesus died and rose for sins of all people
4. Avoid writing about certain “taboos”

Publishers of Christian novels include B&H Publishing Group, Baker Publishing Group (whose imprints include Baker Academic, Baker Books, Bethany House, Brazos Press, Chosen, and Revell), Bridge-Logos Foundation, David C. Cook, HarperCollins Christian (Thomas Nelson) and Zondervan, Harvest House, Howard Publishing (a division of Simon & Schuster), Kregel Publications, Tyndale House, and Waterbrook Press (a division of Random House). Such novels are today marketed world-wide through Christian bookstores and online distributors, such as ChristianBook.com and Amazon.com, respectively.

== Urban Christian fiction ==
Urban Christian fiction is an Imprint of the Kensington Publishing Corp.

It is a genre in which conflicting stories of emotion and vividness mixes God, the urban church, and faith. The stories usually portray African-American or Latino characters who have God at the center of their lives. Violence and sex is not normally included, but may appear whenever necessary for the story line. The Urban Christian publishing company also publishes other subdivisions including urban renaissance and urban soul. Novels such as In the Shadows of Myrmidons by B. Lloyd Reese and Nicholas J. Rzepczynsk fall into the Young Adult/ Superhero genre.

Some best-selling authors in this genre for 2012 were Kimberla Lawson Roby, Victoria Christopher Murray, Tony Dungy, Lutishia Lovely, Neta Jackson, Keyon C. Polite, Serita Jakes (wife of Bishop T.D. Jakes), and ReShonda Tate Billingsley.

Some best-selling authors in this genre for 2015 were Jonathan Cahn, Karen Kingsbury, William Paul Young, Sarah Price (author) and Francine Rivers.

Urban Christian fiction is classified as part of the African-American Christian Market (AACM), where the best-selling topics include fiction, books for dating, dramatic testimony, and single parenting. Prominent pastors of megachurches and leaders of powerful ministries contributes largely to AACM. The Baker Publishing Group also publish African-American authors of Christian fiction and religious materials.

== See also ==
- Amish romance
- List of Christian fiction authors
- List of Christian novels
- Theological fiction
- Christian science fiction
- Religious fiction (index)
