= Christy Award =

American award for Christian literature

Christy Awards
- Country: United States
- Presented by: Evangelical Christian Publishers Association
- First award: 1999; 27 years ago
- Website: www.christyawards.com

The Christy Awards, established in 1999, are awarded each year to recognize fiction of excellence written from a Christian perspective with matters of faith at its core. Awards are given in nine categories, including romance, suspense, visionary, contemporary (stand-alone novels and series), and historical. In addition, an award is given for first novel and young adult.

The Christy Awards are named in honor of Catherine Marshall and her novel Christy, and are intended to nurture and encourage the writing and publishing of fiction written from a Christian worldview and showcase the breadth and depth of fiction available.

In 2017, the Evangelical Christian Publishers Association (ECPA), an international non-profit trade organization, assumed ownership and administration of the award. Winners are chosen by industry insiders, including reviewers, editors, bookstore owners, and book buyers.

In 2021, the Own Voice Award was added for Christian fiction writers of color who draw on their experience as people of color in their writing.

At the 2022 Christy Awards, Toni Shiloh won the Amplify Award, a new award to honor underrepresented ethnic stories, for In Search of a Prince, and Amanda Cox won Book of the Year and first place in the general fiction category for The Secret Keepers of Old Depot Grocery. Cox had previously won the 2021 Book of the Year award for her novel The Edge of Belonging. In 2022, Becky Wade was inducted into the Christy Hall of Fame for winning four or more Christy awards. In 2018, Becky Wade had won Book of the Year and first place in the contemporary romance category for her novel True to You.
