= List of Hallmark Channel Original Movies (2000s) =

This is a list of television films produced for the cable network Hallmark Channel in the 2000s including its early years corresponding to the 2000–2007 period. Such films are currently called Hallmark Channel Original Movies.

The films listed between January 2000 and July 2001 were aired by the Hallmark Channel's predecessor, Odyssey Network. It was in the year 2000 that the uninterrupted stream of original holiday movies began. Both Hallmark Channel and Odyssey Network have been run by their parent company Crown Media. Hallmark Movie Channel, which launched in January 2004, showcased movies and miniseries for the next four years that already premiered on Hallmark Channel, Hallmark Hall of Fame and other third-party sources. Furthermore, this new and evolving sister channel would not receive measured TV ratings until 2008.

Key to 2000–2002 tables
†	Sherlock Holmes 4-movie franchise series

== 2000 ==
No.	Movie	Starring	Director	Original airdate	Viewers	Ref	DVD
1	A Storm in Summer	Peter Falk, Andrew McCarthy and Nastassja Kinski	Robert Wise	February 27, 2000			
2	Arabian Nights (2-part miniseries)	Mili Avital and Jason Scott Lee	Steve Barron	April 30, 2000			
3	Personally Yours (a.k.a. Wilderness Love)	Valerie Bertinelli and Jeffrey Nordling	Jeffrey Reiner	October 8, 2000			
4	The Hound of the Baskervilles^{†}	Matt Frewer and Kenneth Welsh	Rodney Gibbons	October 21, 2000			
5	The Christmas Secret (a.k.a. Flight of Reindeer)	Beau Bridges and Richard Thomas	Ian Barry	December 17, 2000			

== 2001 ==
No.	Movie	Starring	Director	Original airdate	Viewers	Ref	DVD
1	Second Honeymoon	Roma Downey and Tim Matheson	Larry Peerce	March 11, 2001			
2	The Monkey King (a.k.a. The Lost Empire)	Thomas Gibson, Bai Ling, and Russell Wong	Peter MacDonald	March 11, 2001			
3	The Sign of Four^{†}	Matt Frewer and Kenneth Welsh	Rodney Gibbons	March 23, 2001			
4	Prince Charming	Martin Short and Christina Applegate	Allan Arkush	July 13, 2001			
5	The Infinite Worlds of H.G. Wells	Tom Ward, Katy Carmichael and Eve Best	Robert Young	August 5, 2001			
6	The Royal Scandal^{†}	Matt Frewer and Kenneth Welsh	Rodney Gibbons	October 19, 2001			
7	Snow White: The Fairest of Them All	Miranda Richardson, Kristin Kreuk and Tyron Leitso	Caroline Thompson	October 28, 2001			
8	The Wedding Dress	Neil Patrick Harris, Tyne Daly and Margaret Colin	Sam Pillsbury	October 28, 2001			
9	A Town Without Christmas	Patricia Heaton, Rick Roberts and Peter Falk	Andy Wolk	December 16, 2001			
10	The Sons of Mistletoe	Roma Downey and George Newbern	Steven Robman	December 19, 2001			

== 2002 ==
No.	Movie	Starring	Director	Original airdate	Viewers	Ref	DVD
1	Stranded	Liam Cunningham and Brana Bajic	Charles Beeson	January 12, 2002			
2	Roughing It	Robin Dunne and James Garner	Charles M. Smith	March 16, 2002			
3	Johnson County War	Tom Berenger, Luke Perry and Rachel Ward	David S. Cass Sr.	August 24, 2002			
4	Hans Christian Andersen: My Life as a Fairytale	Kieran Bew and Emily Hamilton	Philip Saville	September 8, 2002			
5	The Case of the Whitechapel Vampire^{†}	Matt Frewer and Kenneth Welsh	Rodney Gibbons	October 27, 2002			
6	Santa Jr.	Lauren Holly, Judd Nelson and Nick Stabile	Kevin Connor	November 30, 2002			
7	Snow Queen (2-part miniseries)	Bridget Fonda and Chelsea Hobbs	David Wu	December 7, 2002			
8	Silent Night	Linda Hamilton	Rodney Gibbons	December 14, 2002			
9	A Christmas Visitor	William Devane and Meredith Baxter	Christopher Leitch	December 21, 2002			

== 2003 ==
No.	Movie	Starring	Director	Original airdate	Viewers	Ref	DVD
1	The Last Cowboy	Jennie Garth, Lance Henriksen and Bradley Cooper	Joyce Chopra	January 17, 2003			
2	Straight from the Heart	Teri Polo and Andrew McCarthy	David S. Cass Sr.	February 9, 2003			
3	Love Comes Softly	Katherine Heigl and Dale Midkiff	Michael Landon Jr.	April 13, 2003			
4	Audrey's Rain	Jean Smart, Carol Kane and Richard Gilliland	Sam Pillsbury	May 11, 2003			
5	The King and Queen of Moonlight Bay	Tim Matheson, Sean Young and Kristen Bell	Sam Pillsbury	June 15, 2003			
6	Hard Ground	Burt Reynolds, Bruce Dern and Amy Jo Johnson	Frank Q. Dobbs	July 12, 2003			
7	Mystery Woman	Kellie Martin and Clarence Williams III	Walter Klenhard	August 31, 2003			
8	Monster Makers	Linda Blair and Adam Baldwin	David S. Cass Sr.	October 26, 2003			
9	A Time to Remember	Doris Roberts and Dana Delaney	John Putch	November 23, 2003			
10	Finding John Christmas	Valerie Bertinelli, David Cubitt and Peter Falk	Andy Wolk	November 30, 2003			
11	A Carol Christmas	Tori Spelling, Gary Coleman and William Shatner	Matthew Irmas	December 7, 2003			

== 2004 ==
No.	Movie	Starring	Director	Original airdate	Viewers	Ref	DVD
1	Just Desserts	Lauren Holly and Costas Mandylor	Kevin Connor	February 8, 2004			
2	A Place Called Home	Ann-Margret, Matthew Settle, and Shailene Woodley	Michael Tuchner	March 7, 2004			
3	The Long Shot	Julie Benz, Marsha Mason, and Paul Le Mat	Georg Stanford Brown	April 18, 2004			
4	Life on Liberty Street	Annabeth Gish, Ed Begley Jr., and Ethan Embry	David S. Cass Sr.	May 9, 2004			
5	King Solomon's Mines	Patrick Swayze and Alison Doody	Steve Boyum	June 12, 2004			
6	La Femme Musketeer	Nastassja Kinski, Gérard Depardieu, and Michael York	Steve Boyum	June 20, 2004			
7	The Trail to Hope Rose	Lou Diamond Phillips, Marina Black, and Lee Majors	David S. Cass Sr.	July 3, 2004			
8	Wedding Daze	John Larroquette, Karen Valentine, and French Stewart	Georg Stanford Brown	August 6, 2004			
9	Hollywood Mom's Mystery	Justine Bateman, Angie Everhart, and Andrew McCarthy	David S. Cass Sr.	August 8, 2004			
10	Murder Without Conviction	Megan Ward, David Proval, and Patty Duke	Kevin Connor	September 5, 2004			
11	Frankenstein	Parker Posey and Vincent Perez	Marcus Nispel	October 5–6, 2004			
12	Love's Enduring Promise	January Jones, Logan Bartholomew, and Katherine Heigl	Michael Landon Jr.	November 20, 2004			
13	A Boyfriend for Christmas	Kelli Williams and Patrick Muldoon	Kevin Connor	November 27, 2004	3.50		Yes
14	When Angels Come to Town	Tammy Blanchard, Katey Sagal, and Peter Falk	Andy Wolk	November 28, 2004			
15	Eve's Christmas	Elisa Donovan and Cheryl Ladd	Timothy Bond	December 6, 2004			
16	Single Santa Seeks Mrs. Claus	Steve Guttenberg and Crystal Bernard	Harvey Frost	December 11, 2004			
17	Angel in the Family	Meredith Baxter, Ronny Cox, and Natasha Gregson Wagner	Georg Stanford Brown	December 18, 2004			

== 2005 ==
No.	Movie	Starring	Director	Original airdate	Viewers	Ref	DVD
1	Mystery Woman: Mystery Weekend	Kellie Martin and Clarence Williams III	Mark Griffiths	January 7, 2005			
2	McBride: The Chameleon Murder	John Larroquette and Marta DuBois	Kevin Connor	January 14, 2005			
3	Jane Doe: Vanishing Act	Lea Thompson, Joe Penny, and William R. Moses	James A. Contner	January 21, 2005			
4	Annie's Point	Betty White, Richard Thomas, and Amy Davidson	Michael Switzer	January 22, 2005			
5	Mystery Woman: Snapshot	Kellie Martin and Clarence Williams III	Georg Stanford Brown	January 28, 2005			
6	McBride: Murder Past Midnight	John Larroquette and Marta DuBois	Kevin Connor	February 4, 2005			
7	Family Plan	Jordan Bridges, Tori Spelling and Greg Germann	David S. Cass Sr.	February 12, 2005			
8	Jane Doe: Now You See It, Now You Don't	Lea Thompson, Joe Penny, and William R. Moses	Armand Mastroianni	February 18, 2005			
9	Mystery Woman: Sing Me a Murder	Kellie Martin and Clarence Williams III	Stephen W. Bridgewater	February 25, 2005			
10	McBride: It's Murder, Madam	John Larroquette and Marta DuBois	Kevin Connor	March 4, 2005			
11	Jane Doe: Til Death Do Us Part	Lea Thompson, Joe Penny, and William R. Moses	Armand Mastroianni	March 11, 2005			
12	Thicker than Water	Melissa Gilbert and Brian Wimmer	David S. Cass Sr.	March 12, 2005			
13	Out of the Woods	Edward Asner, Jason London, and Mel Harris	Stephen W. Bridgewater	April 2, 2005			
14	Ordinary Miracles	Jaclyn Smith and Lyndsy Fonseca	Michael Switzer	May 7, 2005			
15	Icon	Patrick Swayze and Patrick Bergin	Charles Martin Smith	May 30, 2005			
16	Mystery Woman: Vision of a Murder	Kellie Martin and Clarence Williams III	Kellie Martin	June 5, 2005			
17	McBride: The Doctor Is Out... Really Out	John Larroquette and Marta DuBois	John Larroquette	June 12, 2005			
18	Fielder's Choice	Chad Lowe, Marin Hinkle, and George Segal	Kevin Connor	June 18, 2005			
19	Jane Doe: The Wrong Face	Lea Thompson, Joe Penny, and William R. Moses	Mark Griffiths	June 19, 2005			
20	The Colt	Ryan Merriman and Steve Bacic	Yelena Lanskaya	July 9, 2005			
21	Back to You and Me	Dale Midkiff and Lisa Hartman Black	David S. Cass Sr.	July 23, 2005			
22	McBride: Tune in for Murder	John Larroquette and Marta DuBois	Stephen W. Bridgewater	August 14, 2005			
23	Karol: A Man Who Became Pope	Piotr Adamczyk and Malgorzata Bela	Giacomo Battiato	August 15, 2005			
24	Mystery Woman: Game Time	Kellie Martin and Clarence Williams III	David S. Cass Sr.	August 21, 2005			
25	McBride: Anybody Here Murder Marty?	John Larroquette and Marta DuBois	Jim Contner	August 28, 2005			
26	Supernova	Luke Perry, Tia Carrere, and Peter Fonda	John Harrison	September 5, 2005			
27	Landslide	Vincent Spano and Alexandra Paul	Neil Kinsella	September 10, 2005			
28	Mysterious Island	Kyle MacLachlan and Gabrielle Anwar	Russell Mulcahy	September 17, 2005			
29	The Reading Room	James Earl Jones and Joanna Cassidy	Georg Stanford Brown	November 26, 2005			
30	Love's Long Journey	Erin Cottrell and Logan Bartholomew	Michael Landon Jr.	December 3, 2005			
31	Meet the Santas	Steve Guttenberg and Crystal Bernard	Harvey Frost	December 17, 2005			
32	Detective (a.k.a. Arthur Hailey's Detective)	Tom Berenger, Annabeth Gish, and Cybill Shepherd	David S. Cass Sr.	unknown, 2005			

== 2006 ==
No.	Movie	Starring	Director	Original airdate	Viewers	Ref	DVD
1	Murder 101	Dick Van Dyke and Barry Van Dyke	Christian I. Nyby II	January 7, 2006			
2	Jane Doe: Yes, I Remember It Well	Lea Thompson, Joe Penny, and William R. Moses	Armand Mastroianni	January 14, 2006			
3	Mystery Woman: At First Sight	Kellie Martin and Clarence Williams III	Kellie Martin	January 21, 2006			
4	Hidden Places	Sydney Penny, Jason Gedrick, and Shirley Jones	Yelena Lanskaya	January 28, 2006			
5	Falling in Love with the Girl Next Door	Crystal Allen, Ken Marino, and Patty Duke	Armand Mastroianni	February 4, 2006			
6	Jane Doe: The Harder They Fall	Lea Thompson, Joe Penny, and William R. Moses	Lea Thompson	March 4, 2006			
7	McBride: Fallen Idol	John Larroquette and Marta DuBois	John Larroquette	March 11, 2006			
8	Mystery Woman: Wild West Murder	Kellie Martin and Clarence Williams III	David S. Cass Sr.	March 18, 2006			
9	Our House	Doris Roberts and Judy Reyes	Mark Griffiths	March 25, 2006			
10	Though None Go with Me	Cheryl Ladd and Amy Grabow	Armand Mastroianni	April 8, 2006			
11	Where There's a Will	Marion Ross, Frank Whaley, and Christine Elise	John Putch	May 6, 2006			
12	The Curse of King Tut's Tomb	Casper Van Dien, Leonor Varela, and Jonathan Hyde	Russell Mulcahy	May 27, 2006			
13	McBride: Requiem	John Larroquette and Marta DuBois	Mark Griffiths	May 31, 2006			
14	Blackbeard	Angus Macfadyen and Richard Chamberlain	Kevin Connor	June 17, 2006			
15	Desolation Canyon	Stacy Keach, Patrick Duffy, and Kenneth Johnson	David S. Cass Sr.	July 1, 2006			
16	Wild Hearts	Richard Thomas and Nancy McKeon	Steve Boyum	July 8, 2006			
17	Mystery Woman: Oh Baby	Kellie Martin and Clarence Williams III	David S. Cass Sr.	August 19, 2006			
18	Merlin's Apprentice	Sam Neill and Miranda Richardson	David Wu	September 2, 2006			
19	Final Days of Planet Earth	Daryl Hannah, Gil Bellows, and Campbell Scott	Robert Lieberman	October 14, 2006			
20	Mystery Woman: Redemption	Kellie Martin and Clarence Williams III	David S. Cass Sr.	November 6, 2006			
21	The Christmas Card	Edward Asner, John Newton, and Alice Evans	Stephen W. Bridgewater	December 2, 2006			
22	What I Did for Love	Jeremy London, Dorie Barton, and Sally Struthers	Mark Griffiths	December 9, 2006			
23	Love's Abiding Joy	Erin Cottrell, Dale Midkiff, and Logan Bartholomew	Michael Landon Jr.	December 16, 2006			

== 2007 ==
No.	Movie	Starring	Director	Original airdate	Viewers	Ref	DVD
1	Murder 101: College Can Be Murder	Dick Van Dyke, Barry Van Dyke, and Shane Van Dyke	John Putch	January 6, 2007			
2	Mystery Woman: In the Shadows	Kellie Martin and Clarence Williams III	David S. Cass Sr.	January 13, 2007			
3	McBride: Semper Fi	John Larroquette and Marta DuBois	John Larroquette	January 20, 2007			
4	Love Is a Four Letter Word	Teri Polo and Robert Mailhouse	Harvey Frost	February 3, 2007			
5	Sacrifices of the Heart	Melissa Gilbert and Cyril O'Reilly	David S. Cass Sr.	March 3, 2007			
6	McBride: Dogged	John Larroquette and Marta DuBois	John Larroquette	March 10, 2007			
7	Jane Doe: Ties That Bind	Lea Thompson and Joe Penny	James A. Contner	March 17, 2007			
8	Love's Unending Legacy	Erin Cottrell and Dale Midkiff	Mark Griffiths	April 7, 2007			
9	A Stranger's Heart	Samantha Mathis and Peter Dobson	Andy Wolk	May 5, 2007			
10	Jane Doe: How To Fire Your Boss	Lea Thompson and Joe Penny	James A. Contner	May 8, 2007			
11	Pandemic	Tiffani Thiessen, Faye Dunaway, and French Stewart	Armand Mastroianni	May 26, 2007			
12	Marco Polo	Ian Somerhalder, BD Wong, and Brian Dennehy	Kevin Connor	June 2, 2007			
13	You've Got a Friend	John Schneider and Bitty Schram	James A. Contner	June 9, 2007			
14	Avenging Angel	Kevin Sorbo and Cynthia Watros	David S. Cass Sr.	July 7, 2007			
15	Claire	Valerie Bertinelli and Ray Baker	Stephen Bridgewater	August 11, 2007			
16	Murder 101: If Wishes Were Horses	Dick Van Dyke and Barry Van Dyke	David S. Cass Sr.	August 18, 2007			
17	A Grandpa for Christmas	Ernest Borgnine and Katherine Helmond	Harvey Frost	November 24, 2007			
18	All I Want for Christmas	Gail O'Grady and Robert Mailhouse	Harvey Frost	December 1, 2007			
19	The Note	Genie Francis and Ted McGinley	Douglas Barr	December 8, 2007			
20	Love's Unfolding Dream	Erin Cottrell, Scout Taylor-Compton and Dale Midkiff	Harvey Frost	December 15, 2007			

== 2008 ==
Movie	Starring	Director	Original airdate	Viewers	Ref	DVD
Charlie & Me	Tom Bosley and Jordy Benattar	David Weaver	January 5, 2008			
Jane Doe: Eye of the Beholder	Lea Thompson, Joe Penny, and William R. Moses	Lea Thompson	January 12, 2008			
The Good Witch	Catherine Bell	Craig Pryce	January 19, 2008			
Daniel's Daughter	Laura Leighton and Sebastian Spence	Neill Fearnley	January 26, 2008			
Bridal Fever	Andrea Roth and Delta Burke	Ron Oliver	February 2, 2008			
Final Approach	Dean Cain and Anthony Michael Hall	Armand Mastroianni	May 24, 2008			
A Gunfighter's Pledge (a.k.a. The Pledge)	Luke Perry and C. Thomas Howell	Armand Mastroianni	July 5, 2008			
Every Second Counts	Stephen Collins and Magda Apanowicz	John Bradshaw	July 12, 2008			
Murder 101: The Locked Room Mystery	Dick Van Dyke, Barry Van Dyke, and Shane Van Dyke	David S. Cass Sr.	August 2, 2008			
Dear Prudence	Jane Seymour	Paul Schneider	August 23, 2008			
For the Love of Grace	Mark Consuelos and Chandra West	Craig Pryce	August 30, 2008			
Ladies of the House	Florence Henderson, Donna Mills, and Pam Grier	James A. Contner	October 15, 2008			
Generation Gap	Edward Asner and Alex Black	Bill L. Norton	October 25, 2008			
Mail Order Bride	Daphne Zuniga, Greg Evigan, and Cameron Bancroft	Anne Wheeler	November 8, 2008			
Accidental Friendship	Chandra Wilson and Ben Vereen	Don McBrearty	November 15, 2008			
An Old Fashioned Thanksgiving	Jacqueline Bisset, Helene Joy, and Tatiana Maslany	Graeme Campbell	November 22, 2008			
Moonlight and Mistletoe	Tom Arnold and Candace Cameron Bure	Karen Arthur	November 29, 2008			
The Christmas Choir	Jason Gedrick, Rhea Perlman, and Marianne Farley	Peter Svatek	December 6, 2008			
The Most Wonderful Time of the Year	Henry Winkler, Brooke Burns, and Warren Christie	Michael M. Scott	December 13, 2008			
Our First Christmas	Dixie Carter and Julie Warner	Armand Mastroianni	December 20, 2008			
A Kiss at Midnight	Faith Ford and Cameron Daddo	Bradford May	December 27, 2008			
Son of the Dragon	David Carradine, Rupert Graves, Desiree Siahaan, and John Reardon	David Wu	April 2–3, 2008			

== 2009 ==
Movie	Starring	Director	Original airdate	Viewers	Ref	DVD
The Nanny Express	Vanessa Marcil, Brennan Elliott, and Stacy Keach	Bradford May	January 3, 2009			
Expecting a Miracle	Jason Priestley and Teri Polo	Steve Gomer	January 10, 2009			
Taking a Chance on Love (a.k.a. The Note II)	Genie Francis and Ted McGinley	Douglas Barr	January 31, 2009			
The Good Witch's Garden	Catherine Bell, Chris Potter, and Catherine Disher	Craig Pryce	February 7, 2009			
Before You Say I Do	David Sutcliffe and Jennifer Westfeldt	Paul Fox	February 14, 2009			
Bound by a Secret	Meredith Baxter and Lesley Ann Warren	David S. Cass Sr.	March 7, 2009			
Relative Stranger	Eriq La Salle, Michael Michele, and Cicely Tyson	Charles Burnett	March 14, 2009			
Love Takes Wing	Sarah Jones, Haylie Duff, and Jordan Bridges	Lou Diamond Phillips	April 4, 2009			
Love Finds a Home	Sarah Jones, Haylie Duff and Jordan Bridges	David S. Cass Sr.	April 11, 2009			
Chasing a Dream	Treat Williams and Andrew Lawrence	David Burton Morris	April 25, 2009			
Living Out Loud	Gail O'Grady and Michael Shanks	Anne Wheeler	May 2, 2009			
Safe Harbor	Nancy Travis and Treat Williams	Jerry Jameson	May 30, 2009			
Come Dance at My Wedding	John Schneider, Brooke Nevin, and Roma Downey	Mark Jean	June 6, 2009			
Angel and the Badman	Lou Diamond Phillips and Deborah Kara Unger	Terry Ingram	July 5, 2009			
The Gambler, the Girl and the Gunslinger	Dean Cain, James Tupper, and Allison Hossack	Anne Wheeler	July 11, 2009			
Mending Fences	Laura Leighton and Angie Dickinson	Stephen Bridgewater	July 18, 2009			
Mrs. Washington Goes to Smith	Cybill Shepherd	Armand Mastroianni	August 1, 2009			
Citizen Jane	Ally Sheedy, Sean Patrick Flanery, and Meat Loaf	Armand Mastroianni	September 12, 2009			
Always and Forever	Rena Sofer, Dean McDermott, and Barbara Eden	Kevin Connor	October 24, 2009			
Flower Girl	Marla Sokoloff, Marion Ross, and Kieren Hutchison	Bradford May	November 14, 2009			
The National Tree	Andrew McCarthy and Kari Matchett	Graeme Campbell	November 28, 2009			
Mrs. Miracle	James Van Der Beek and Erin Karpluk	Michael M. Scott	December 5, 2009			
Christmas in Canaan	Billy Ray Cyrus, Jaishon Fisher, and Zak Ludwig	Neill Fearnley	December 12, 2009			
The Three Gifts	Dean Cain, Jean Louisa Kelly, and Mimi Kennedy	David S. Cass Sr.	December 19, 2009			

== See also ==
- List of Hallmark Hall of Fame episodes (and Category)
- List of programs broadcast by Hallmark Channel (and Category)
- List of Hallmark Channel Original Movies
