= Believe Pictures =

- Company type: Filmmaking
- Founded: 2003
- Founder: Brian Bird; Michael Landon, Jr.
- Headquarters: United States
- Website: Believe-Pictures.com

Believe Pictures is an independent production company founded by partners Brian Bird, and Michael Landon, Jr. They have created (or co-created) major films such as The Last Sin Eater, the Love Comes Softly film series and Saving Sarah Cain, which won a 2008 CAMIE Award.

Most of the releases went to Fox Faith for home video distribution.

== Filmography ==
- Love Comes Softly (April 13, 2003)
- Love's Enduring Promise (November 20, 2004)
- Love's Long Journey (December 3, 2005)
- Love's Abiding Joy (October 6, 2006)
- The Last Sin Eater (February 9, 2007)
- Love's Unending Legacy (April 7, 2007)
- Saving Sarah Cain (August 19, 2007)
- Love's Unfolding Dream (December 15, 2007)
