= Love's Long Journey =

- Written by: Douglas Lloyd Mcintosh; Cindy Kelly; Michael Landon Jr. Janette Oke
- Directed by: Michael Landon Jr.
- Starring: Erin Cottrell; Logan Bartholomew; John Savage; Dale Midkiff
- Theme music composer: Kevin Kiner
- Country of origin: United States
- Original language: English

Production
- Producers: Brian Gordon; Erik Olson
- Editor: Andrew Vona
- Running time: 88 min

Original release
- Network: Hallmark Channel
- Release: December 3, 2005

Related
- Love's Enduring Promise; Love's Abiding Joy

Love's Long Journey is a 2005 made-for-television Christian drama film based very loosely on a series of books by Janette Oke. It was directed by Michael Landon Jr. and was originally aired on Hallmark Channel on December 3, 2005.

It is the third movie in the Love Saga, which includes Love Comes Softly (2003), Love's Enduring Promise (2004), Love's Abiding Joy (2006), Love's Unending Legacy (2007), Love's Unfolding Dream (2007), Love Takes Wing (2009), and Love Finds a Home (2009), as well as the 2011 prequels, Love Begins and Love's Everlasting Courage and was produced for Hallmark by Larry Levinson Productions.

== Synopsis ==
After lots of planning and dreaming, young couple Willie LaHaye (Logan Bartholomew) and Missie LaHaye (Erin Cottrell) have headed West on the Wagon Trail, leaving behind the hometown of Missie's parents. Missie is caught between the excitement of the new adventure and the pain of not knowing when she'll see her family again. Willie and Missie leave the Wagon Train and travel further West to Tettsford Junction. When they get there, they meet a boy called Jeff and his older brother Sonny who they see riding into town with two other outlaws. Unknown to Jeff, Sonny's 'job' is being part of a gang of outlaws and hijacking and stealing from innocent people.

When Willie and Missie arrive on their new farm, the tiny house is old and run down, but Missie is happy because it is the first home they can call their own. Missie is worried that Willie is working too hard on their new farm, and she doesn't find the right time to tell him of her pregnancy. Later on, they are riding over their land together, and they see Native Americans, and Willie fears for Missie's safety. They find a good place between the trees to bury their money box of hard-earned savings, and Missie draws a map to mark out the spot. Later on in town, Willie interviews a few men and hires four ranch hands, Henry, Cookie, Fyn, and Scottie. Meanwhile, Missie meets one of their neighbors, a Native American woman named Miriam Red Hawk McClain who becomes her friend.

When Missie is riding over to the Native camp to take books and teach the children how to read, a group of hunters from the camp close in on her and chase her at a gallop back to the camp just for a bit of fun, and Miriam comes out and apologized deeply and introduces her brother Sharp Claw, and her husband Sean. Willie finds out that Missie was riding out alone and fearing that the Indians might have chased her, he rides straight away to the Indian camp to find her. Back at the house, Willie is mad that Missie rode out on her own, and he forbids her to do it again. But she refuses and tells Willie that she believes the Lord sent Miriam to her to help deliver their baby, and Willie tells her he is the happiest man alive.

The next day, Sonny is teaching Jeff how to rope when Trent and Pacey have someone else they want to rob and Sonny has to leave Jeff again. The next day is Christmas Day and Missie invites the ranch hands to Christmas dinner and they are all touched because they have not had Christmas dinner for many years. In town, Jeff asks Missie to read him a note Sonny sent him and it says that Sonny will be back after Christmas, and Jeff runs off, knowing he will have to have Christmas by himself. That night Missie and the ranch hands are all in the house decorating the Christmas tree. Willie is still in town and when he finally comes back Missie is mad at him because it is Christmas Eve, but then she realizes he was so late because he brought Jeff back with him. Fyn lifts Jeff up and he puts the star on top of the Christmas tree. Then they have a big dinner and open their presents and Scotty is very touched because it is the first Christmas present he had ever got.

The next day Sonny and the others come back into town and Jeff is delighted to see Sonny again. That night in the saloon, the ranch hands are having drinks and playing cards and Trent and Pacey come up and Fyn says that Willie "digs up a box of money to pay us, just like buried treasure." Trent and Pacey immediately get the idea to rob Willie.

When Willie, Missie, Jeff, and Henry are having a Sunday morning meeting, Sonny, Trent, and Pacey hijack the house to get Willie's money. Willie and the ranch hands are tied to a fence and held at gun point by Sonny and Pacey, while Missie is forced to ride out with Trent and dig up their buried money. Willie tells Sonny to tell Jeff "what you really does for a living, stealing from innocent people. Probably been involved in a murder or two." Jeff urges Sonny to tell Willie that he is wrong and he's never killed anyone, and Sonny tells Jeff that he's "never killed nobody," and that he's doing this for him, to build a ranch of their own, to get a better life for them.

Out in the woods, Missie finds a pistol underneath the money box, and she points it at Trent and shoots straight through the middle of the note he's holding. Back at the house, Willie hears the shots and finally frees himself, running at Pacey and knocks him to the ground. But Sonny runs over to help Pacey, and they soon have Willie tied up on the ground again. A rider gallops up, presumably Trent, with no Missie in sight. Jeff desperately asks Sonny if Missie is ok, and Sonny yells at the rider, saying that Missie better not be hurt. But the rider suddenly points a pistol at Pacey's back and pulls down the face-covering bandana; everyone is stunned to see that it is Missie, who had taken over Trent and put his coat and hat on, leaving him tied up to a tree near the money box. Missie orders Sonny to untie Willie, and then Willie picks up a gun and tells Sonny to "tie up Pacey, just like you did to us, and then maybe we'll ask the Lord to spare your life." But when Sonny went to tie up Pacey, Pacey said, "Let me help you with that," as he pulled a gun from his pocket and shot Sonny. Willie immediately shoots Pacey in the shoulder while Missie, Jeff, and Fyn run over to Sonny, who asks for their forgiveness for everything he's done. Missie forgives him, knowing that he isn't a bad man underneath and he only stole to support his little brother, and she promises to look after Jeff. Shortly after, Sonny passes away.

That night Missie goes into labor, and with Miriam as her midwife, she gives birth to a baby boy named Matthew Isiah LaHaye, after Willie's brother Mathew who died when they were kids.

== Cast ==
Actor	Role
Erin Cottrell	Missie LaHaye
Logan Bartholomew	Willie LaHaye
Frank McRae	Cookie
Irene Bedard	Miriam "Red Hawk" McClain
Gil Birmingham	Sharp Claw
W. Morgan Sheppard	Scottie
James Tupper	Henry Kline
Johann Urb	Fyn Anders
Jeff Kober	Pacey
Richard Lee Jackson	Sonny Huff
Graham Phillips	Jeff Huff
Stephen Bridgewater	Mr. Taylorsen
Diane Salinger	Diane Louise Salinger
John Savage	Trent
Dale Midkiff	Clark Davis

== Differences from the novel ==
- In the novel, while Willie goes on out to the homestead, Missie stays with the Taylorsons in Tettsford Junction for 3 months so she can be near a doctor when she delivers her baby. Willie's ranch in the novel is a 6-day wagon trip from Tettsford Junction. A new town is later built near the ranch in Love's Abiding Joy
- Willie and Missie name their son Nathan Isaiah in the novel. Nathan is the middle name of both Willie and Clark; Isaiah is after the Bible verse they memorized for the journey west. Nathan Isaiah is the name shown in the films end-credits, instead of Matthew Isaiah, the name in the film.
- There is no Sonny or Jeff in the novel. There is also no native family living near the Ranch. The novel depicts a family of Mexicans.

== Awards ==
The following people received "Camie Awards" in 2006 for their role in making the film:

- Larry Levinson (executive producer)
- Brian Gordon (producer)
- Erik Olson (producer)
- Michael Landon Jr. (director & screenwriter)
- Cindy Kelley (screenwriter)
- Janette Oke (author of book)
- Erin Cottrell (actress)
- Logan Bartholomew (actor)

== Notes ==
Missie was portrayed by January Jones in the second movie.
