= Love's Unfolding Dream =

- Written by: Michael Landon Jr. Cindy Kelley; Janette Oke
- Directed by: Harvey Frost
- Starring: Erin Cottrell; Dale Midkiff
- Theme music composer: Stephen Graziano
- Country of origin: United States
- Original language: English

Production
- Producers: Brian Gordon; Erik Oslon
- Editor: Jennifer Jean Cacavas
- Running time: 87 min

Original release
- Network: Hallmark Channel
- Release: December 15, 2007

Related
- Love's Unending Legacy; Love Takes Wing

Love's Unfolding Dream is a 2007 made-for-television Christian drama film and the sixth film based on a series of books by Janette Oke. It originally aired on Hallmark Channel on December 15, 2007 and was produced for Hallmark by Larry Levinson Productions. It was directed by Harvey Frost. It is the sixth film in an ongoing series that includes Love Comes Softly (2003), Love's Enduring Promise (2004), Love's Long Journey (2005), and Love's Abiding Joy (2006), Love's Unending Legacy (2007), Love Takes Wing (2009), and Love Finds a Home (2009), as well as the 2011 prequels Love Begins, Love's Everlasting Courage, and Love's Christmas Journey.

== Plot ==
In a time when and place where women were not usually permitted careers, especially in the medical field, Belinda Tyler (Scout Taylor-Compton) deeply wants to be a doctor and feels that God has called her to be one. She displays her abilities while helping out a local doctor and caring for Mrs. Stafford-Smith (Nancy Linehan Charles), an elderly woman who recently had a stroke.

While Belinda nurses Mrs. Stafford-Smith back to health and helps her regain the use of her right arm, she meets Drew Simpson (Patrick Levis), the nephew of a deceased neighbor. He has come to town to prepare his uncle's farm for sale. Once that's done, he will return to New York City to join his father's law practice; he has no wish to stay in this small, unsophisticated town.

But after meeting Belinda, he has second thoughts. She also feels something for him, but her life plan is to become a doctor, then move back home to provide medical care to her family and neighbors; She says to Drew in regret that his life in New York seems now a "dream" to Her and that after a while he won't even "remember" Her. Although most women of the time only married and had children, Belinda wants more and is not marriage oriented. She has a great mind for medicine and also feels called to it by God. She doesn't see how a relationship with Drew would work, especially when Mrs. Stafford-Smith offers to put her through medical school in Boston. She informs Drew of her plan and prepares to leave. But after Belinda's grandfather shares how he recognized his feelings for wife Marty, Drew realizes that he cannot live without Belinda. Meanwhile, Belinda's mother and grandmother counsel her about her future and advise her to pray.

Just as Belinda boards the stagecoach, Drew arrives and tells her he loves her and is willing to practice law in Boston while she's in medical school. Once she becomes a doctor, they will move back to this small town together if that is what she wants. He asks her to marry him.

Knowing she feels the same way about Drew, Belinda finally admits her feelings and accepts his marriage proposal. She and Drew are married with her family and friends present before they move to Boston together.

== Cast ==
Actor	Role
Erin Cottrell	Missie Tyler
Scout Taylor-Compton	Belinda Tyler
Dale Midkiff	Clark Davis
Robert Pine	Dr. Micah Jackson
Victor Browne	Sheriff Zach Tyler
Patrick Levis	Drew Simpson
Richard Herd	Windsor
Paul Ganus	Charles Kent
Lori Rom	Sadie Kent
Samantha Smith	Marty Davis
J.C. Brandy	Caroline
John Prosky	George
Tahmus Rounds	Jonas Barnes
Timmy Deters	Caleb Kent
Nancy Linehan Charles	Virginia Stafford-Smith

== Differences from the novel ==
- In the novel, Belinda is 11–16 years old and becomes a nurse for her brother, Luke Davis.
- Dr. Jackson is a possible reference to Jackson Brown, a boy who went to school with Belinda, and later becomes a doctor working with Luke Davis, in the books.
- Belinda and Drew Simpson meet differently in the film than in the novel. In the novel, Belinda is with Luke when he removes Drew's arm after it is crushed in a logging accident. Drew later saves her after she is thrown from her horse. They get married in the novel Love Finds a Home. Drew's mother is also alive, and he also has a younger brother.
- Aaron (Clare in the novel) and Arnie are not shown in the film, nor any of their family that are all mentioned in the novel. Aaron and Ellie are part of the 2011 film Love's Christmas Journey, but do not have the same spouses and children that are mentioned in the novels.
- Belinda's care for Virginia Stafford-Smyth after she has a stroke takes place in Love Takes Wing. She became ill on the train and was brought to Luke's office. Windsor came later to see her. Virginia is said to have two grandsons whom she raised after her son and his wife died. It is stated in the film that her son never had children. Belinda later returned to Boston with her.

== Awards ==
Timmy Deters was nominated in 2008 for a Young Artist Award for Best Performance in a TV Movie, Miniseries or Special - Supporting Young Actor
