= Love Takes Wing =

- Based on: Love Takes Wing by Janette Oke
- Teleplay by: Rachel Stuhler
- Directed by: Lou Diamond Phillips
- Starring: Sarah Jones; Haylie Duff; Jordan Bridges; Patrick Duffy; Cloris Leachman
- Music by: Terry Plumeri
- Country of origin: United States
- Original language: English

Production
- Producers: Kyle A. Clark; Stephen Niver
- Editor: Colleen Halsey
- Running time: 88 min.

Original release
- Network: Hallmark Channel
- Release: April 4, 2009

Related
- Love's Unfolding Dream; Love Finds a Home

Love Takes Wing is a 2009 made-for-television Christian drama film and the seventh film based on a series of books by Janette Oke. It aired on Hallmark Channel on April 4, 2009. Lou Diamond Phillips directed from a script by Rachel Stuhler, based on the book Love Takes Wing by Janette Oke.

It is the seventh film in an ongoing series that includes Love Comes Softly (2003), Love's Enduring Promise (2004), Love's Long Journey (2005), Love's Abiding Joy (2006), Love's Unending Legacy (2007), and Love's Unfolding Dream (2007), and Love Finds a Home (2009), as well as two 2011 prequels, Love Begins, Love's Everlasting Courage, and Love's Christmas Journey.

== Plot ==
Mourning her husband's recent death, Dr. Belinda Simpson (Sarah Jones) arrives in the tiny town of Sikeston to fill the post of town physician. Once there she discovers that many of the town’s residents, including children at an orphanage run by Miss Hattie Clarence (Cloris Leachman), have fallen ill or died from an unknown ailment. She soon wonders if she is in over her head, despite reassurances from her best friend Annie (Haylie Duff) and Lee (Jordan Bridges), the town blacksmith.

Sikeston's residents are distrustful of Belinda's abilities as a doctor because she is a woman. Many of them don't even want her to help the orphans, whom they blame for infecting the rest of the town; some would be happy to see the orphanage close altogether. Opposed by what seems like the entire town, Belinda must trust in her abilities, her friends, and her faith to guide her.

== Cast ==
- Sarah Jones as Dr. Belinda Simpson
- Cloris Leachman as Miss Hattie Clarence
- Annalise Basso as Lillian
- Jordan Bridges as Lee Owens
- Haylie Duff as Dr. Annie Nelson
- Patrick Duffy as Mayor Evans
- Lou Diamond Phillips as Ray Russell
- Erin Cottrell as Missie Tyler
- Kevin Richardson as Cyrus

== Differences From The Novel ==
- The book picks up two years after the last novel.
- None of the events depicted in this film occur in the novel.
- Belinda goes to Boston with Virginia Stafford-Smyth to continue caring for her. She does not go to Boston to become a doctor as depicted in the film Love's Unfolding Dream. In fact, Belinda only trains as a nurse in the novels.
- Clark and Marty are present in the novel, but not in the film.
- Belinda is a single woman in the novel. She marries her husband Drew in the final novel, Love Finds a Home. With the exception of Belinda herself, the majority of the characters in the film never exist in the book.

== Reception ==
The premiere of Love Takes Wing was moderately successful for Hallmark Channel, delivering a solid showing among demo ratings and deliveries, particularly among female viewers. The original movie ranked in the top five for selected demographics, and ranked as the second-highest-rated ad-supported cable movie of the day and week delivering a 2.4 household rating with 2.1 million homes, over 2.8 million total viewers and 3.9 million unduplicated viewers. This performance helped the network rank #2 for the night with a 2.0 household rating. Robert Bell of Exclaim! found the film to be "pedestrian, cheap and linguistically repetitive". He thought that although it had a more somber premise, the film would be enjoyed by church-attending moms and their daughters. The Dove Foundation lauded the film for providing numerous teachings about compassion, faith, and love. DVD Talk's Paul Mavis criticized the actors' performances and said the film had "a left-over plot" that is "poorly executed".
