= Love's Enduring Promise =

- Written by: Cindy Kelley; Michael Landon Jr. Janette Oke
- Directed by: Michael Landon Jr.
- Starring: January Jones; Mackenzie Astin; Dale Midkiff; Katherine Heigl
- Theme music composer: Kevin Kiner
- Country of origin: United States
- Original language: English

Production
- Producers: Lincoln Lageson; Randy Pope
- Editor: Colleen Halsey
- Running time: 88 min

Original release
- Network: Hallmark Channel
- Release: November 20, 2004

Related
- Love Comes Softly; Love's Long Journey

Love's Enduring Promise is a 2004 made-for-television Christian drama film based on a series of books by Janette Oke.

The film is the second in the Love Comes Softly series of television movies on Hallmark Channel that includes Love Comes Softly (2003), Love's Long Journey (2005), Love's Abiding Joy (2006), Love's Unending Legacy (2007), Love's Unfolding Dream, Love Takes Wing (2009), and Love Finds a Home produced for Hallmark by Larry Levinson Productions(2009), as well as the 2011 prequels Love Begins and Love's Everlasting Courage.

== Synopsis ==
Missie Davis (January Jones) is a young woman working as a school teacher in the West. She falls in love with a rich young man called Grant Thomas (Mackenzie Astin) who works on the railroad, and he asks her to dine with him on Saturday.

Missie's father Clark is out cutting wood when he accidentally drops his axe and it hits his leg and badly injures it. His son tries to help him but Clark falls unconscious. A young man called Willie LaHaye (Logan Bartholomew) is riding past and sees what happened, and quickly gets Clark into his cart and takes him to his home. Missie rushes to take Clark inside while Willie rides off before Missie can thank him. The doctor tells Clark's wife Marty that Clark has had a serious injury and has to rest for at least a few weeks because if the wound gets infected then he could lose his leg or worse. Missie has to close the school and work in the fields doing the ploughing because her father can't, and she misses her dinner with Grant.

Willie is riding past and sees Missie struggling with the plough in the pouring rain, and the next day he rides up and finishes the ploughing for her. That night, he takes a look at Clark's injured leg, and tells Marty he has to open the wound to clean it because it has a bad infection. The next day, Clark is awake and even hungry, and Missie joyfully asks Willie for supper that night.

Meanwhile, Grant is trying to find Missie after she didn't turn up to dinner on Saturday, and eventually gets directions to the Davis farm. Willie and Missie go out on a ride together and almost get caught by a mob of angry bees, but escape by running into a field of flowers. When they get back, Grant arrives at the farm and tells Missie he is going to ask Clark's permission to court his daughter, which Missie happily agrees to.

While out on a walk with a new cane that Willie made him, Clark comes across Willie's father living in a small cabin alone in the woods. He asks Willie about it, and Willie tells him that his brother Matty had died in an accident when they were kids. Their mother grieved so much she moved back East and their father just quit, so Willie moved out, and now he couldn't make himself go back again and face his father. Clark convinces Willie to go and see his father because he thinks Willie's father is ready to see him again. Willie goes to his Pa's cabin and tells him that he has come back to set things right and he wants his Pa to forgive him. But his Pa is mad that Willie is asking him to forgive him, and tells Willie to leave. Meanwhile, Missie went to have dinner with Grant in the town.

That night, Marty tells Missie to make sure that whoever she marries will care for her and honor her. The next day, Missie goes to the railroad camp where Grant lives, and they dance together in his tent. He tells her that in their life together she can have everything she wants and she will never have to toil in a field again. Missie asks him whether he will be there beside her if she does have to plant and plough the fields, but he brushes it off by saying that no wife of his will ever have to struggle in a field because he is a very rich man. He tries to kiss her but she declines because she doesn't want to marry someone who won't want to face adversity together.

Later, Willie finds Missie back in the schoolhouse and gives back her hair ribbons he had taken when they were kids. He tells her he is moving West to find some land of his own to farm, but she convinces him to stay just for the harvest. After the harvest, they are having a party around a campfire one night, and Willie and Missie kiss. The next day he proposes to her, and she accepts.

The new couple leave the Davis Farm to travel West, where Willie is going to buy some land and make a home of their own.

== Cast ==
Actor	Role
January Jones	Missie Davis
Mackenzie Astin	Grant Thomas
Cliff De Young	Zeke LaHaye
Logan Bartholomew	Willie Nathan ('Nate') LaHaye
K'Sun Ray	Aaron Davis
Cara DeLizia	Annie Walker
Dominic Scott Kay	Mattie LaHaye
Logan Arens	Arnie Davis
Dale Midkiff	Clark Davis
Katherine Heigl	Marty Davis
Michael Bartel	Willie ('Nate') LaHaye (age 15)
E.J. Callahan	Asa
Katia Coe	Clara
Douglas Fisher	Edward Trumball
Joshua Michael Kwiat	Surveyor
Robert F. Lyons	Doc Watkins
Blaine Pate	Sam
Matthew Peters	Brian Murphy

== Differences from the novel ==
- This book picks up three years after Love Comes Softly, with Missie being 5 years old, Clare (Aaron in the film) being 3, and Arnie being born in the third chapter. The book takes them up to Missie's teen years. Missie and Clare are closer together in age than they are depicted in the film.
- Zeke LaHaye and his wife have three children in the novel: Tessie, Nathan, and Willie. Tessie and Nathan are not mentioned in the film. Willie's full name in the film is Willie Nathan LaHaye, as mentioned in the novel Love's Long Journey. Willie did not have a younger brother named Mattie in the novel. His mother and sister die.
- Clark and Marty have a daughter, Elvira "Ellie", and another son, Luke, who are not shown in the film. Many other characters mentioned in the book are not mentioned in the film, such as Nandry and Clae Larson. Though Ellie isn't seen or mentioned in some of the other films in the original series, she is shown as a character with her brother Aaron in the film Love's Christmas Journey
- In the book, Missie only courted Ben and Ma Graham's son before Willie LaHaye.
- Some of the situations in the film were not directly from the book.

== Awards ==
The following people won a Camie Award in 2005 for their part in making the film:

- Robert Halmi Jr. (executive producer)
- Larry Levinson (executive producer)
- Lincoln Lageson (executive producer)
- William Spencer Reilly (executive producer)
- Michael Landon Jr. (director/screenwriter)
- Cindy Kelley (screenwriter)
- Janette Oke (author of original book)
- January Jones (actress)
- Logan Bartholomew (actor)
- Mackenzie Astin (actor)
- Dale Midkiff (actor)
- Katherine Heigl (actress)

=== Nominations ===
- Epiphany Prize ... Most Inspiring TV Program from MovieGuide
- Grace Award ... Most Inspiring Television Acting for Dale Midkiff from MovieGuide

== Notes ==
In real life Jones, who portrays Heigl's almost-adult stepdaughter, is 10 months her senior.
