= Nightmare Weekend =

- Promotional artwork
- Directed by: Henry Sala
- Written by: George Faget-Benard
- Produced by: Andre Feingold; Gerald Gottlieb; Bachoo Sen
- Starring: Joan Krosche; Debbie Laster; Dale Midkiff; Debra Hunter; Andrea Thompson; Lori Lewis
- Cinematography: Denis Gheerbrant
- Edited by: David Gilbert
- Music by: Martin Kershaw
- Distributed by: Troma Entertainment
- Release date: 1986
- Running time: 86 minutes
- Countries: United States; United Kingdom; France
- Language: English

Nightmare Weekend is a 1986 horror B-movie directed by Henry Sala and distributed by Troma Entertainment. It features the first film role of NYPD Blue actress Andrea Thompson.

== Plot ==
A brilliant professor invents a complex computer program meant to better society by altering the bad behavior of its test subjects. However, this sometimes causes the personal belongings of these subjects to transform into deadly metal pinballs that attack people, as one unfortunate burglar discovers. His shut-in daughter also uses the machine like a video game, unaware or uncaring of its real world effects on nearby machinery turning against their users. She also owns a strange puppet named George which may be alive, helping her make decisions about her life.

In league with a mysterious man, the professor's psychotic assistant gets hold of the program and manipulates it to warp people's minds and turn them into murderous weapons. She selects three young college girls as her victims and invites them to the professor's house for a weekend of torture and diabolical experiments. Accompanying the young women are a pair of local sleazy barflies who are looking to score with the college girls.

Over the course of the weekend, freakish and sexy hijinks ensue while the college girls are subjected to the machine's weird effects. Meanwhile, the shut-in daughter contemplates the meaning of falling in love after turning to George for advice.

== Home media ==
The film was restored in 2K from its 35mm internegative and released on Blu-ray by Vinegar Syndrome in 2016.
