= Beneath Us =

2020 American horror-thriller film

- Directed by: Max Pachman
- Written by: Max Pachman; Mark Mavrothalasitis
- Produced by: Luis Guerrero; Chris Lemos
- Starring: Lynn Collins; Rigo Sanchez; Josue Aguirre; James Tupper; Roberto Sanchez; Thomas Chavira
- Cinematography: Jeff Powers
- Edited by: Taylor Alexander Ward
- Music by: Joshua Moshier
- Production company: Vital Pictures
- Distributed by: Vital Pictures
- Release dates: April 11, 2019 (Phoenix Film Festival); March 6, 2020 (United States)
- Running time: 90 minutes
- Country: United States
- Languages: English; Spanish
- Box office: $137,260

Beneath Us is a 2019 American horror-thriller film written by Max Pachman and Mark Mavrothalasitis, and directed by Pachman. The film stars Lynn Collins, Rigo Sanchez, Josue Aguirre, James Tupper, Roberto Sanchez, and Thomas Chavira. It was released theatrically in the United States by Vital Pictures on March 6, 2020.

== Plot ==
A group of undocumented workers hired by a wealthy American couple are held against their will at the couple’s secluded mansion, and must fight to prove they are not expendable and cannot be discarded so easily.

The couple hire illegal immigrant workers to build their various properties and then kill them like slaves. After the three workers are killed, the surviving member Alejandro turns the tables and kills the husband by choking him to death. He confronts the wife but she escapes until he shoots her dead. He then steals the couple's money to give it to a human smuggler to get his family to the US.

== Cast ==
- Lynn Collins as Liz Rhodes
- Rigo Sanchez as Alejandro
- Josue Aguirre as Memo
- James Tupper as Ben Rhodes
- Thomas Chavira as Tonio
- Nicholas Gonzalez as Homero Silva
- Edy Ganem as Sandra Silva
- Andrew Burlinson as Richard
- David Castro as Jesus

== Production ==
Beneath Us is Max Pachman's feature directorial debut, and is produced by Luis Guerrero and Chris Lemos, with Jay Hernandez and William Knochel serving as executive producers. It features English and Spanish dialogue. Guerrero said the film was in the works since 2011. In 2017, it was reported that Premiere Entertainment Group had picked up worldwide rights to the film.

== Release ==
The film premiered at the Phoenix Film Festival on April 11, 2019. The film was released theatrically in the United States on March 6, 2020, by Vital Pictures/NME, and it is the first film distributed by the company.
