= Love's Unending Legacy =

- Written by: Pamela Wallace; Janette Oke
- Directed by: Mark Griffiths
- Starring: Erin Cottrell; Dale Midkiff
- Theme music composer: Kevin Kiner
- Country of origin: United States
- Original language: English

Production
- Producers: Brian Gordon; Erik Oslon
- Editor: Colleen Halsey
- Running time: 84 min

Original release
- Network: Hallmark Channel
- Release: April 7, 2007

Related
- Love's Abiding Joy; Love's Unfolding Dream

Love's Unending Legacy is a 2007 made-for-television Christian drama film based on a series of books by Janette Oke. It originally aired on Hallmark Channel on April 7, 2007. It was directed by Mark Griffiths and stars Erin Cottrell. It is the fifth movie in an ongoing series that includes Love Comes Softly (2003), Love's Enduring Promise (2004), Love's Long Journey (2005), Love's Abiding Joy (2006), Love's Unfolding Dream (2007), and Love Takes Wing (2009), and Love Finds a Home (2009), as well as the 2011 prequels, Love Begins, Love's Everlasting Courage, and Love's Christmas Journey which fits part way through the movie series.

== Synopsis ==
Missie LaHaye bids a reluctant goodbye at the grave of her late husband Willie, who died two years previously in the line of duty as the sheriff of Tettsford Junction. Even after giving up her job as the town schoolteacher, Missie has found running the ranch on her own overwhelming, so she has resigned herself to letting her son Jeff and his new bride take control of it jointly with her brothers Aaron and Arnie.

Missie and her ten-year-old son Mattie travel back to her hometown to live near the farm of her parents, Clark and Marty Davis. She goes back to teaching school. At her first Sunday service, Missie and Mattie learn from the Pastor that an "Orphan Train" with homeless children in need of good homes will soon arrive from the Children's Aid Society of New York. Outside the church, Clark introduces Missie to sharp-tongued biddy Mrs. Pettis, who disdains the orphans as "ragamuffins." At the same time, Missie catches the eye of a passing horseman: bachelor Sheriff Zach Tyler, another target of Mrs. Pettis’ vitriol. Claiming that Zach is not a godly man, Mrs. Pettis passes her judgment on him, implying he has a shameful past on the wrong side of the law.

On her way to work, Missie passes the church just as the orphan distribution is underway. Although she is firmly determined not to grant Mattie's request for a new sibling, she goes in—just in time to witness 14-year-old Belinda behaving belligerently toward the Pettises as they choose eight-year-old Jacob—looking on him as a farm worker rather than a son. Realizing that the lone orphan Belinda will be sent back to the foundling home in New York, Missie volunteers to adopt the poor Romantic soul.

Unbeknownst to all, Belinda is Jacob's sister. She kept this secret to prevent potential parents from breaking up siblings because they see her as "too old" to adopt. With Jacob secured in a home nearby, Belinda can figure out a way for them to flee; she believes that their father had given them up for adoption with the full intention of reuniting with them in the near future. She is so sure of this that she resists family life within the loving embrace of Missie, the Davises, Zach, and the community; she sneaks out of Missie's home nightly to reassure Jacob that soon they will leave together. She becomes more determined after learning that the Pettises beat and starve him.

Missie tells her mother Marty that she feels as if a voice inside told her to adopt Belinda, but she still can't explain why. Perhaps, says Marty, "God knew that Belinda needed you. And maybe, for some reason you don’t understand yet, you need her." Little Mattie LaHaye befriends together with Mr. Davis a white pup out of the dog heard he names Snowball! Zach attempts to court Missie, but she resists, explaining she could never love anyone the way she loved her late husband. Missie then struggles to convince herself that although she is not in love with the sheriff, at least he would make a good marriage partner.

While Missie discusses Belinda's disturbing nocturnal disappearances with Zach, who has warmed her heart with his kindness toward the young girl, he states he has no faith in God if a child can suffer like Belinda. Later, Missie tells her mother she couldn't love a man who didn't share her faith. Zach and Missie discover Jacob's plight, but are anguished that they can't rescue him unless he exposes the Pettises, which he won't out of fear of reprisal. While Missie and Zach appreciate their mutual desire to help the boy, they clash over how to save him. An angry Belinda berates them for their inability to help Jacob, claiming her father will soon come to their aid.

Exasperated by Belinda's rejection, Missie visits Marty, who reminds her that Missie once had trouble accepting Marty as her stepmother. Sagely, she tells Missie that "loving a child has nothing to do with giving birth" and "being a family is a choice, not necessarily something that just happens because you’re related by blood." Belinda shows Missie a note written by her father. Belinda can't read, but is sure the note explains how he'll come back for her and Jacob. Missie then reads her the note, and Belinda learns that her father had actually left them at the orphanage for good.

Later, Zach visits Missie at the school to explain his lack of faith: his fiancée was an innocent victim of murderous bank robbers. Missie then relates the story of her husband's death.

After Missie again fails to rescue Jacob, Belinda runs away with him into the stormy night. Everyone joins a desperate search for them. Amid the lightning-laden thunderstorm, Zach prays. He then hears a voice over the din and follows it to the abandoned mine where the children have sought shelter. Zach tells Missie it was God's miracle that guided him in the wilderness, but as she later admits to her father, she doesn't know how to "let go" of her late husband. Clark tells her love doesn't die when a person passes away; it stays in a person's heart forever as she moves on to a new life with a new chance for happiness. Missie takes that chance by marrying Zach. They adopt Jacob as well and begin their lives as a family of five.

== Cast ==
Actor	Role
Erin Cottrell	Missie LaHaye
Holliston Coleman	Belinda Marshall-LaHaye
Victor Browne	Sheriff Zach Tyler
Hank Stratton	Pastor Joe
Braeden Lemasters	Jacob Marshall-LaHaye
Dave Florek	Hank Pettis
Stephanie Nash	Mrs. Pettis
Bret Loehr	Calvin
Tanner Richie	Simon Stevens
Ned Schmidtke	Hendricks
Dale Waddington Horowitz	Mrs. Behringer
Brett Coker	Mattie LaHaye
Ken Magee	Mr. Anderson
Samantha Smith	Marty Davis
Dale Midkiff	Clark Davis
Jeremy Shada	Boy in Stagecoach

== Notes ==
- Many of the themes in this film are similar to Little House On The Prairie episode #159, The Lost Ones Part 2.
- The town is the same town used in Dr. Quinn, Medicine Woman Colorado Springs, Colorado.

== Awards ==
Victor Browne and Erin Cottrell won a Camie Awards each for their role in the film. Other winners were: Brian Gordon (producer), Mark Griffiths (director), Dale Midkiff, Pamela Wallace (writer), and Braeden Lemasters.

Braeden Lemasters and Holliston Coleman were each nominated for a Young Artist Award.
