= Erin Cottrell =

American actress

- Occupation: Actress
- Years active: 1999–present
- Website: http://erincottrell.com/

Erin Cottrell is an American actress who has appeared in the role of Missie LaHaye in five of the eight films in the Love Comes Softly series.

She acted in Love's Long Journey, Love's Abiding Joy, Love's Unending Legacy, Love's Unfolding Dream, and Love Takes Wing. She acted with Logan Bartholomew in Love's Long Journey and Love's Abiding Joy. In all of the films, she portrays the adult Missie Davis-LaHaye-Tyler except in the second film of the series.

Cottrell had a major role in an episode of Cold Case season five, episode 11, where she plays an art teacher in one of America's internment camps for people of Japanese ancestry during World War II. Her character plays a small part in the destruction of a Japanese family, as she is seen kissing a married man, but he tells her that his wife is the only one he loves, and he goes on to be killed. The episode is based on finding this man's real killer.

She has also had a role on NCIS Season 9, episode 11, playing a United States Marine lieutenant who is pregnant with the child of a deceased Afghan man (who is the leader of a prominent tribe). She delivers her baby with Leroy Jethro Gibbs at her side during a shootout with the men hired by her baby's father's family to kidnap the baby at a gas station in the middle of a Christmas Eve snowstorm.

She also voiced Delilah Copperspoon for the video game Dishonored, specifically Dishonored: The Knife of Dunwall and Dishonored: The Brigmore Witches. She reprised her role in the sequel Dishonored 2.

== Filmography ==
Film
Year	Title	Role	Notes
2001	WatchUsDie.com	Constance Mercado	
2003	Legally Blonde 2: Red, White & Blonde	Delta Nu President	
2014	The Identical	Jenny O'Brien	

Television
Year	Title	Role	Notes
2000	Strangers with Candy	Relay Team Member	Episode: "Blank Relay"
2000-2001	All My Children	Marilyn	TV series
2001	Ed	Amanda Bays	Episode: "Loyalties"
2001-2002	Guiding Light	Camille Baptiste	TV series
2005	Little House on the Prairie	Caroline Ingalls	TV miniseries
2005	Faith of My Fathers	Carol McCain	TV movie
2005	ER	Claire	Episode: "Nobody's Baby"
2005	Love's Long Journey	Missie LaHaye	TV movie
2006	Wedding Altered	Maid of Honor	Episode: "Wedding Altered #3"
2006	Love's Abiding Joy	Missie LaHaye	TV movie
2007	Numb3rs	Caroline Williams	Episode: "Pandora's Box"
2007	Love's Unending Legacy	Missie LaHaye	TV movie
2007	CSI: NY	Patty Nelson	Episode: "Buzzkill"
2007	Cold Case	Mary Anne Clayton (1942-1944)	Episode: "Family 8108"
2007	Love's Unfolding Dream	Missie Tyler	TV movie
2008	Medium	Madeline McKenzie	Episode: "Drowned World"
2008	Street Warrior	Sarah Campbell	TV movie
2009	Meteor	Chelsea Hapscomb	TV miniseries
2009	Love Takes Wing	Missy Tyler	TV movie
2011	NCIS	Marine Lt. Emma Reynolds	Episode: "Newborn King"
2012	The Glades	Leslie Vonn	Episode: "The Naked Truth"

Video games
Year	Title	Voice role	Notes
2011	Might & Magic Heroes VI	Elisabeth	
2012	Kingdom Hearts 3D: Dream Drop Distance	Quorra	
2012	Starhawk	Tilly Anderson, Crowd	
2012	Dishonored	Delilah Copperspoon	The Knife of Dunwall DLC; The Brigmore Witches DLC
2014	WildStar	Cassian Female, Mechari Female	
2015	Final Fantasy Type-0 HD	Caetuna	
2015	Disney Infinity 3.0	Quorra	
2016	Dishonored 2	Delilah Copperspoon	
2016	Final Fantasy XV	Additional voices	
2017	Kingdom Hearts HD 2.8 Final Chapter Prologue	Quorra	Archival audio
2017	For Honor	Mercy	
2020	Final Fantasy VII Remake	Scarlet	
2024	Final Fantasy VII Rebirth	Scarlet	
2025	Disney Speedstorm	Quorra	
