= Frank McRae =

American actor and football player (1941–2021)

- Born: March 18, 1941; Memphis, Tennessee, U.S.
- Died: April 29, 2021 (aged 80); Santa Monica, California, U.S.
- Occupation: Actor
- Years active: 1972–2006

Frank McRae (March 18, 1941 – April 29, 2021) was an American film and television actor and a professional football player.

== Early life ==
McRae was born in Memphis, Tennessee. He graduated from Tennessee State University with a double major in drama and history. He was a defensive tackle for the Chicago Bears in the 1967 NFL season appearing in 6 games.

== Career ==
Among his acting roles are bank robber Reed in Dillinger (1973), as Steamer Riley in Walking Tall Part 2 (1975), a shouting police captain named Haden in 48 Hrs. (1982), a role he later parodied in Last Action Hero (1993) and Loaded Weapon 1 (1993); the history teacher, Mr. Teasdale, in Red Dawn (1984); James Bond's friend Sharkey in Licence to Kill (1989); and former professional boxing champion Harry Noble in Batteries Not Included (1987). He also appeared opposite Sylvester Stallone in 4 films: F.I.S.T. (1978), Paradise Alley (1978), Rocky II (1979), and Lock Up (1989), as well as a protective trucker in The Wizard (1989).

He made an effective pairing with John Candy as two bumbling subordinates; first as two tank soldiers (under an equally bumbling Sgt. Frank Tree played by Dan Aykroyd) in the film 1941 (1979), and later as a "Walley World" security guard in National Lampoon's Vacation (1983). He further showed his comedic abilities as Jim the clumsy mechanic in the cult classic Used Cars (1980). His last role was Cookie in the Hallmark Channel original films Love's Long Journey and Love's Abiding Joy.

== Death ==
On April 29, 2021, McRae died from a heart attack in Santa Monica, California, at the age of 80.

== Selected filmography ==
Year	Title	Role	Notes
1972	Cool Breeze	Barry, Mercer's Servant	uncredited
1973	Shaft in Africa	Osiat	
1973	Snatched	Cheech	ABC Movie of the Week
1973	Dillinger	Reed Youngblood	
1974	Bank Shot	Hermann X	
1975	Hard Times	Hammerman	
1975	Walking Tall Part 2	Steamer Riley	
1976	Pipe Dreams	Moose	
1976	Tracks	Train Coachman	
1978	F.I.S.T.	Lincoln Dombrowsky	
1978	Big Wednesday	Sergeant	
1978	The End	Male Nurse	
1978	Paradise Alley	Big Glory	
1979	Norma Rae	James Brown	
1979	Rocky II	Meat Foreman	
1979	1941	Pvt. Ogden Johnson Jones	
1980	City in Fear	Captain Madison	
1980	Used Cars	Jim the Mechanic	
1982	Cannery Row	Hazel	
1982	48 Hrs.	Captain Haden	
1983	National Lampoon's Vacation	Grover	
1984	Red Dawn	Mr. Teasdale	
1987	Batteries Not Included	Harry Noble	
1989	Farewell to the King	Tenga	
1989	Licence to Kill	Sharkey	
1989	Lock Up	"Eclipse"	
1989	The Wizard	Spankey	
1990	Another 48 Hrs.	Captain Haden	uncredited
1993	Loaded Weapon 1	Captain Doyle	
1993	Last Action Hero	Lieutenant Dekker	
1994	Lightning Jack	Mr. Doyle	
1997	The Killing Jar	Det. Bernie Morris	
1998	Mr. P's Dancing Sushi Bar	Bruce McFee	
1999	Hijack	Roger Tate	
2000	One Hell of a Guy	Moe	
2000	G-Men from Hell	Lester	
2005	Love's Long Journey	Cookie	
2006	Love's Abiding Joy	Cookie	
