= Another Woman's Husband =

- Genre: Drama
- Based on: Swimming Lessons by Lynne Hugo and Anna Tuttle Villegas
- Written by: Anna Tuttle Villegas; Lynne Hugo
- Directed by: Noel Nosseck
- Starring: Gail O'Grady; Lisa Rinna; Dale Midkiff; Sally Kirkland; Charlotte Rae; Bob Larkin; Amzie Strickland; Carroll Baker
- Theme music composer: Mark Snow
- Country of origin: United States
- Original language: English

Production
- Executive producer: Chuck McLain
- Cinematography: Alan Caso
- Editor: Scott Conrad
- Running time: 91 minutes
- Production companies: Hearst Entertainment; C.M. Two Production

Original release
- Network: Lifetime
- Release: March 6, 2000

Another Woman's Husband is a 2000 television movie starring Gail O'Grady, Lisa Rinna, Dale Midkiff, Sally Kirkland, Charlotte Rae, Bob Larkin, Amzie Strickland and Carroll Baker. It was directed by Noel Nosseck and written by Anna Tuttle Villegas and Lynne Hugo.
