= Wild Hearts (film) =

- Genre: Drama
- Written by: Donald Martin; Mitchell Gabourie
- Directed by: Steve Boyum
- Starring: Richard Thomas; Hallee Hirsh; Nancy McKeon
- Country of origin: United States
- Original language: English

Production
- Executive producer: Larry Levinson
- Producers: Albert T. Dickerson III; Jeff Kloss
- Cinematography: James W. Wrenn
- Editors: Christine Kelley; Andrew Vona
- Production company: Larry Levinson Productions

Original release
- Network: Hallmark Channel
- Release: July 8, 2006

Wild Hearts is a 2006 American made-for-television drama film starring Emmy Award winning actor Richard Thomas, Hallee Hirsh and Nancy McKeon. The film premiered on Hallmark Channel on July 8, 2006.

== Plot summary ==
A widowed Los Angeles police detective inherits his family mustang ranch in Montana and returns with his reluctant daughter. He takes a job as sheriff and soon must contend with a series of events that cause him to come to terms with his past.

== Cast ==
- Richard Thomas as Bob Hart
- Hallee Hirsh as Madison
- Nancy McKeon as Emily
- Geoffrey Lewis as Hank
- A. J. Trauth as Tim
