= Love's Abiding Joy =

- Written by: Michael Landon Jr. Douglas Lloyd McIntosh; Bridget Terry; Janette Oke
- Directed by: Michael Landon Jr.
- Starring: Erin Cottrell; Logan Bartholomew; Dale Midkiff
- Theme music composer: Kevin Kiner
- Country of origin: United States
- Original language: English

Production
- Producers: Brian Gordon; Erik Oslon
- Editor: Colleen Halsey
- Running time: 87 min

Original release
- Network: Hallmark Channel
- Release: October 6, 2006

Related
- Love's Long Journey; Love's Unending Legacy

Love's Abiding Joy is a 2006 made-for-television Christian drama film based on a series of books by Janette Oke. It was directed by Michael Landon Jr. and stars Erin Cottrell and Logan Bartholomew. It is the fourth movie in the Love Saga, which includes Love Comes Softly (2003), Love's Enduring Promise (2004), Love's Long Journey (2005), Love's Abiding Joy (2006), Love's Unending Legacy (2007), Love's Unfolding Dream (2007), Love Takes Wing (2009), and Love Finds a Home (2009), as well as the 2011 prequels, Love Begins and Love's Everlasting Courage.

== Synopsis ==
Between drought and a cattle plague, Missie LaHaye (Erin Cottrell) takes up a teaching position to help support her husband Willie (Logan Bartholomew) and their two children. They have a young son Mattie, and a baby daughter Kathy. They also have a teenage boy called Jeff who they took in when he was eleven-years-old, when his older brother Sonny had been shot dead in the previous film, Love's Long Journey, and Jeff didn't have any other family.

In spite of the need for money, Willie turns down mayor, businessman, and land baron Samuel Doros (John Laughlin) when he offers him a job as sheriff. When Missie's father, Clark Davis (Dale Midkiff), comes out to visit and help out for a few weeks, the happiness of the family is cut short when the morning after he arrives, Missie going to get Kathy up, finds that she has stopped breathing. Grief-stricken, the couple bury their daughter, but find that emotional turmoil is shaking their faith.

Missie returns to teaching, but discovers that being with children is too much for her so soon after her loss. Although it means that Willie and Missie hardly ever see each other, Willie realizes that they are in desperate need for money, and that the loss of Missie's teaching income will not leave them with enough, so he accepts Sam Doros's original offer as sheriff, leaving the ranch in the hands of his ranch hand Scottie and adopted son, Jeff (Drew Tyler Bell). In the meanwhile, Jeff has caught the attention of Doros's daughter, Colette (Mae Whitman). Clark tries to comfort and encourage Missie, who has "just stopped" according to ranch hand and cook Cookie.

Willie soon discovers that Doros is using him as a pawn to further his own selfish schemes, including evicting ranchers who have fallen behind on payments after Doros loaned them money with the intention of taking their land when they inevitably could not keep up with the payments. Making the situation far worse, one of the people Doros is after is Willie and Missie's friend and former ranch hand Henry Klein (James Tupper), who is now married and is ranching his own spread and will not have the money to pay Doros until after he drives his cattle to market. Doros has already taken the horse that Henry's father-in-law had given to them as a gift for his own daughter, Colette. Heartsick, Willie struggles to make sense of the situation, knowing that his friend Joe Paxson (Blake Gibbons) has already been forced to send his wife and daughter back East after Doros took over his land and everything he owned, and he must warn the Kleins that Doros will do the same thing to them if they can't pay.

Henry's wife, Melinda (Brianna Brown), goes to visit Missie shortly thereafter and ends up telling Missie about their struggles. Missie, determined to help, offers to go back to teaching, which Willie resists, knowing that she still is not ready and saying that he needs to know that Missie is always safe at home. Missie suggests that they pray about the situation together. Willie goes into the barn after saying that he doesn't know what to pray for, and finds that he is able to cry for the first time since Kathy's death, and asks God to help him not have to evict Henry and Melinda from their land. Missie puts together her most expensive possessions, including the locket her mother gave her, and sells them to produce the $15 that the Kleins need to stay on their land.

In the middle of this, Doros's daughter Colette continues to pursue Jeff. Contrasting Colette’s formal education, Jeff is a well-read young man who has taken over for Willie on the ranch and is working alongside Scottie, an experienced ranch hand, and Cookie, a ranch hand and the cook. Colette invites him inside her father's house to show him the library of her dead mother, who "lived to read books". She wants to give him Romeo and Juliet, but Doros butts in and insensibly declares that the book is "too fragile to be let out," because he doesn't approve of Jeff for his daughter. Colette secretly visits the ranch frequently and helps Jeff with his chores. Jeff also visits her at her father's ranch. Doros secretly discovers this, but does not let on, though he considers Jeff to be below Colette, who is attending an expensive finishing school in the East.

After a showdown between Henry Klein and Sam Doros, in which Henry gives Doros the money that Missie gives them and then tells Doros that he is "nothing" as a result of his usury and lack of compassion, and that one day, he will regret what he has done, Missie and Clark get caught in a rainstorm, through which, Missie is able to release the pain of losing her daughter and let her go. Afterwards, she goes into town to see Willie and takes him out on a picnic, during which they reconcile, visit the grave of their daughter, and pray together. Doros, pretending to be repentant for what he has done to the Kleins, tells Colette to give the horse he took from Henry to Jeff so that Jeff can give it back to Henry and Melinda. Colette rejoices, unwitting that her father is setting a trap. She and Jeff kiss and promise to write to one another during the months that she is gone.

After Doros puts Colette on a stagecoach back East, Jeff takes the horse to the Kleins, but is stopped by Doros's men and is charged with horse theft. Doros insists that Willie arrest his own son, swearing that Jeff stole the horse. Willie, however, having had suspicions that Doros was being dishonest, has stopped the stagecoach that was supposed to be taking Colette to school. He produces her to prove that Doros was framing Jeff, and she testifies that he is innocent. Because Colette can't go to court against her own father, Willie can't arrest Doros for what he did, but instead his terms are that Doros make amends for what he has done to the Paxsons and the Kleins, and all the others whose land he has taken.

The film closes with Willie getting his first paycheck and buying back Missie's locket, and Clark leaving to go home and telling Willie and Missie to come visit soon.

== Cast ==
Actor	Role
Erin Cottrell	Missie LaHaye
Logan Bartholomew	Willie LaHaye
Frank McRae	"Cookie"
Drew Tyler Bell	Jeff LaHaye
Mae Whitman	Colette Doros
W. Morgan Sheppard	Scottie
James Tupper	Henry Kline
John Laughlin	Samuel Doros
Kevin Gage	John Abel
Brett Coker	Mattie LaHaye
Stephen Bridgewater	Mr. Taylorsen
Brianna Brown	Melinda Kline
Blake Gibbons	Joe Paxson
Dale Midkiff	Clark Davis

== Differences From the novel ==
- Marty and Clark both visited Missie in the novel, where Clark came alone in the film.
- The novel is primarily about Clark and Marty, whereas the film is primarily about Missie and Willie.
- Missie and Willie have another son, Josiah, in the novel, who is not in the film. They later have two daughters, Melissa and Julia, mentioned in later novels. Missie is pregnant with Melissa at the close of this novel. Melissa comes east to stay with Clark and Marty in Love's Unfolding Dream. They do not have and lose an infant daughter named Kathy.
- In the novel, Clark is seriously injured while attempting to rescue two boys from a cave-in. He is near death, but his life is saved by a neighbor doctor, who amputates his leg. This does not happen in the film.
- Willie does not become the town sheriff in the novel.
- The characters Jeff, Colette, and Sam Doros do not exist in the novel.
