= The Gambler, the Girl and the Gunslinger =

- Genre: Comedy; Western
- Written by: Bob Barbash; Larry Cohen
- Directed by: Anne Wheeler
- Starring: Dean Cain; James Tupper; Allison Hossack
- Theme music composer: Brian S. Carr; Terence Davis
- Country of origin: United States
- Original language: English

Production
- Executive producers: Noreen Halpern; Gary Hoffman; John Morayniss; Ira Pincus
- Producer: Randy Cheveldave
- Production location: British Columbia, Canada
- Cinematography: Paul Mitchnick
- Editor: Jana Fritsch
- Running time: 95 min.
- Production companies: Hallmark Channel; Randolph Films; Blueprint Entertainment

Original release
- Release: July 11, 2009

The Gambler, the Girl and the Gunslinger is a 2009 American made for television Western drama directed by Anne Wheeler, starring Dean Cain, James Tupper and Allison Hossack. Two mortal enemies must band together to defend the ranch they've both staked their claim to.

== Plot ==
The Gambler wins half the ranch in a card game. The Gunslinger is not pleased with losing half a ranch. The Girl loves the Gunslinger. A band of a few hundred bandits invade with plans for a new nation. The US army plans to blow everything up to defend the USA. The Gambler likes the Girl, and stays on to help, saving the Gunslinger because of her. Then Gambler and Gunslinger blow up a few rebels. The Gambler, the Girl and the Gunslinger live happily (maybe) ever after on the ranch.

== Cast ==
- Dean Cain as Shea McCall, The Gambler
- James Tupper as BJ Stoker, The Gunslinger
- Allison Hossack as Liz Calhoun, The Girl
- Keith MacKechnie as Cal Stoomey (as Keith Mackechnie)
- Michael Eklund as Red
- John DeSantis as Mule (as John Desantis)
- Teach Grant as Joker
- Serge Houde as Marshal
- Alejandro Abellan as Diego
- Garwin Sanford as The General
- Sheldon Yamkovy as Sergeant

== Reception ==
DVD Talk said, "This is a good B-movie cast in search of better material. But they won't find it here, not in the tame world of a Hallmark western."
