= Katherine Heigl =

American actress (born 1978)

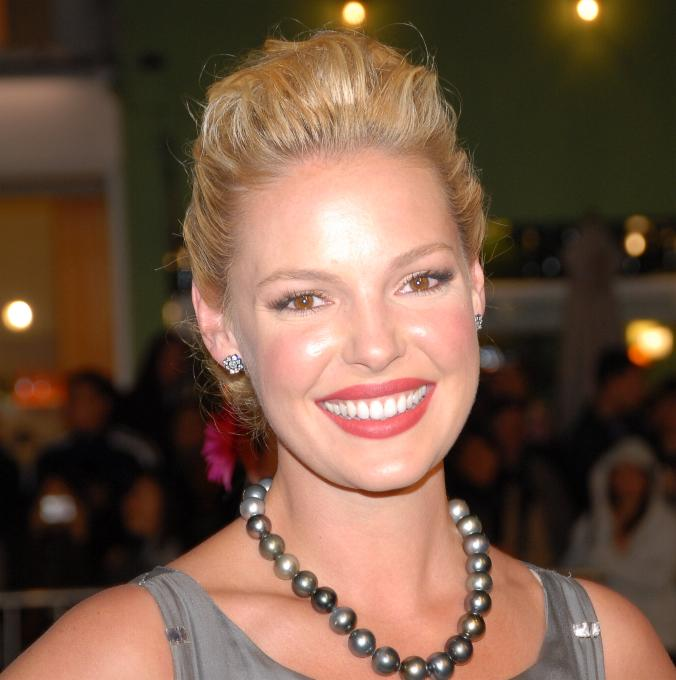
- Heigl at the premiere of 27 Dresses in 2008
- Born: November 24, 1978 (age 47); Washington, D.C., U.S.
- Occupations: Actress; model
- Years active: 1992–present
- Spouse: Josh Kelley (m. 2007)
- Children: 3
- Relatives: Charles Kelley (brother-in-law)
- Website: katherineheigl.info

Katherine Heigl (/ˈhaɪɡəl/ HY-gəl; born November 24, 1978) is an American actress and model. She portrayed Dr. Izzie Stevens on the ABC television medical drama Grey's Anatomy from 2005 to 2010, a role that brought her recognition and accolades, including the Primetime Emmy Award for Outstanding Supporting Actress in a Drama Series in 2007.

Heigl started her career as a child model with Wilhelmina Models before turning her attention to acting, making her film debut in That Night (1992) and later appearing in My Father the Hero (1994), Under Siege 2: Dark Territory (1995), Wish Upon a Star (1996) and Bride of Chucky (1998). She then landed the role of Isabel Evans on The WB television series Roswell (1999–2002), for which she received nominations for the Saturn Awards and Teen Choice Awards.

She then starred in commercially successful romantic comedy films such as Knocked Up (2007), 27 Dresses (2008), The Ugly Truth (2009), Killers (2010), Life As We Know It (2010) and New Year's Eve (2011). She also appeared in Zyzzyx Road (2006), One for the Money (2012), The Big Wedding (2013), and Unforgettable (2017). Heigl has also starred in several films that have seen limited releases, including Jackie & Ryan (2014), Home Sweet Hell (2015), and Jenny's Wedding (2015).

She is also executive producer on her leading television roles, which include the short-lived NBC television series State of Affairs from 2014 to 2015, the Netflix series Firefly Lane (2021–2023) and the upcoming limited series Woodhull. She has voiced characters in the animated film The Nut Job (2014) and its 2017 sequel. Heigl also had a main role in the final two seasons of the USA Network legal drama series Suits (2018–2019).

Additionally, Heigl has established herself as a cover model, appearing in numerous publications including Maxim, Vanity Fair, and Cosmopolitan.

== Early life ==
Heigl was born on November 24, 1978, at the Columbia Hospital for Women in Washington, D.C. She is the youngest of four children of Nancy (née Engelhardt), a personal manager, and Paul Heigl, a financial executive and accountant. Her father is of Irish and German ancestry (including Swiss-German), and her mother is of German descent. Heigl lived in Northern Virginia and then Denver, before her family moved to the town of New Canaan, Connecticut, when Katherine was five, and where she lived the rest of her childhood.

In 1986, her older brother Jason died of injuries suffered in a car accident, after being thrown from the back of a pickup truck while out for lunch with some of his high school classmates. Her brother's death led Heigl's Lutheran mother and Catholic father to convert to the Church of Jesus Christ of Latter-day Saints and Heigl, then eight, was raised in that faith.

== Career ==
=== 1992–1998: Early work ===
When Heigl was nine, her aunt, along with her parents, sent photos of her to a modeling agency. Within a few weeks, she was signed with Wilhelmina Models as a child model. Soon after she was signed with the agency, a client picked her for use in a magazine ad, where she made her modeling debut. At the time, Heigl was earning $75 an hour posing for Sears and Lord & Taylor catalogs. The first time Heigl appeared in a national television ad was for Cheerios cereal.

Heigl began studying acting and made her film debut in That Night (1992). She played Christina Sebastian in Steven Soderbergh's Depression-era drama King of the Hill before being cast in her first leading role in the 1994 comedy My Father the Hero. In 2016, Heigl, who was 14 during filming, said that wearing a thong made her uncomfortable and that kissing a 22-year-old was "very strange in retrospect". During this time, Heigl continued to attend New Canaan High School, balancing her film and modeling work with her academic studies. Heigl dropped out of New Canaan High School after her sophomore year to pursue her career in Hollywood.

In 1995, she starred in the Steven Seagal-directed action thriller Under Siege 2: Dark Territory. Heigl portrayed a 16-year-old named Sarah traveling by train through the mountains with her uncle Casey Ryback (Seagal), an ex-SEAL counter-terrorist expert, in order to visit the grave of her deceased father. The train is hijacked by mercenaries in Colorado, who keep Heigl's character as a hostage. Much of her work in the film was opposite Morris Chestnut, Sandra Taylor and Everett McGill. Despite an increased focus on acting, Heigl still modeled extensively, appearing regularly in magazines such as Seventeen.

She landed the lead role in Disney's made-for-television film Wish Upon a Star in 1996, portraying two body-swapping characters along with Danielle Harris. That year Heigl's parents divorced, and her mother was diagnosed with cancer. After her high school graduation in 1997, Heigl moved into a four-bedroom house in Malibu Canyon, California with her mother, who also became her manager. In 1998, she co-starred with Peter Fonda in the television movie The Tempest, an adaptation of William Shakespeare's play of the same name. The setting of the film was changed to Civil War Mississippi. She also starred in the horror film Bride of Chucky.

=== 1999–2004: Roswell and television movies ===
In 1999, Heigl turned her attention to television when she accepted the role of Isabel Evans on the science fiction TV drama Roswell, a role that was expanded in the show's second and third seasons. Heigl had auditioned for all three of the show's female leads (the other two roles eventually went to Shiri Appleby and Majandra Delfino) before she was finally cast as Isabel, an alien-human hybrid. Heigl was frequently featured in photo essays in magazines such as Life, TV Guide, and Teen as well as FHM. She appeared in the FHM and Maxim calendars, FHM's annual "100 Sexiest Women in the World", and was featured in the Girls of Maxim Gallery. In May 2006, Maxim awarded her #12 on their annual Hot 100 List as well as voted the 19th "Sexiest Woman in the World" by readers of FHM magazine. While Roswell was in production, Heigl worked on several films, including 100 Girls, an independent 2001 film, and Valentine, a horror film starring David Boreanaz and Denise Richards.

Heigl accepted a role in Ground Zero, a television thriller scheduled to be telecast that fall which was based on the bestselling James Mills novel The Seventh Power, in the spring of 2001. She co-starred as a brilliant and politically-concerned college student who helps to build a nuclear device to illustrate the need for a change in national priorities. The device ends up in the hands of a terrorist following betrayal by a fellow student. However, after the September 11, 2001 terrorist attacks, the film was shelved as its plot was considered inappropriate. It was released in 2003 under the title Critical Assembly. After the 9/11 attacks, Heigl recorded a public service announcement for the American Red Cross to help raise money for victims.

In 2003, Heigl appeared in three television movies, including the horror genre Evil Never Dies, a modern-day variation on the Frankenstein story co-starring Thomas Gibson; and Love Comes Softly for Hallmark Entertainment as Marty Claridge, a young, newlywed traveling west, and reprised her role in the sequel Love's Enduring Promise the next year. Dale Midkiff was her co-star in both Hallmark films. Heigl played Isabella Linton in MTV's modern revamp of Emily Brontë's Wuthering Heights. In October 2003, Heigl was cast opposite Johnny Knoxville in The Ringer, a Farrelly brothers comedy that was released in December 2005. Heigl starred as Romy in the 2005 television film Romy and Michele: In the Beginning, a prequel to the 1997 film Romy and Michele's High School Reunion.

=== 2005–2010: Grey's Anatomy and breakthrough ===
In 2005, Heigl was cast as medical intern Dr. Isobel "Izzie" Stevens on the ABC medical drama Grey's Anatomy. The show, initially a mid-season replacement, became a huge ratings success and one of the highest-rated series on broadcast TV. The same year, Heigl landed the starring role in the independent film Side Effects (2005), a romantic comedy about marketing and the pharmaceutical industry, for which she was also executive producer. A year later, Heigl was nominated for the Golden Globe Award for Best Supporting Actress – Series, Miniseries, or Television Film for her work on Grey's Anatomy.

Heigl also starred in Zyzzyx Road; filmed in 2004 and not released until 2006; it has been cited as the lowest-grossing feature film of all time.

In 2007, Heigl had her high-profile film breakthrough with Knocked Up (2007), a comedy from writer/director Judd Apatow, opposite Seth Rogen, Paul Rudd, and Apatow's wife, Leslie Mann. Upon its June 2007 theatrical release, the film received generally positive reviews from critics and proved to be a box office success and a summer romcom hit. The fees Heigl commanded increased after the film's success. The movie grossed $148,761,765 in the U.S., for which she earned a salary of US$300,000. Heigl's role in the film transformed her into Hollywood's new "It girl" according to Vanity Fair.

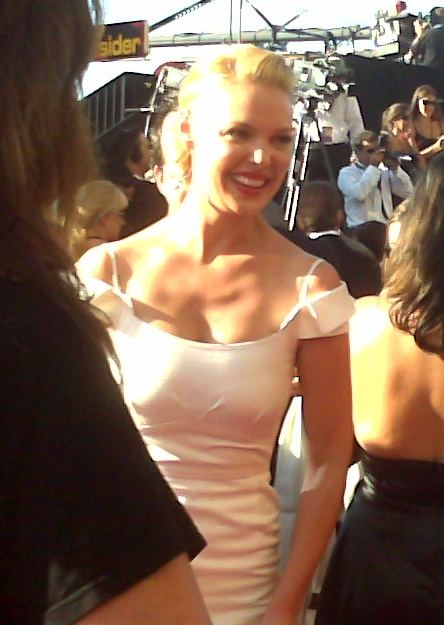
Heigl at the 59th Annual Emmy Awards in 2007

On September 16, 2007, Heigl won the Primetime Emmy Award for Outstanding Supporting Actress in a Drama Series for her role as Izzie Stevens on Grey's Anatomy. When her name was called for the award, her exclamation of "Shit!" was censored.

Heigl starred with James Marsden in the film 27 Dresses, for which she received US$6 million. The New York Post expressed some disappointment with the mismatch of Heigl's talent and the film's "chick-flick" triviality, suggesting Heigl might be more compatible "with female directors such as Kimberly Peirce (Boys Don't Cry) or Tamara Jenkins (The Savages)...". Heigl was announced the Most Desirable Woman of 2008, according to AskMen. Anne Fletcher, the director of 27 Dresses described her as having the "‘It’ factor". She explained further, "You can't buy it; you can't learn it; you can't create it; it just is. We haven't had one of her in many years. Julia Roberts, Sandra Bullock, Meg Ryan – those have been our go-to girls for romantic comedy for a very long time, but we haven't had a new one. Katie has beauty, vulnerability, identifiability. She's funny, charming, lovely to watch. Her slightest eye movement is captivating; you know instantly what's going on."

In a highly publicized Vanity Fair interview, Heigl said that though she enjoyed working with Apatow and Rogen when she starred in Knocked Up, she had a hard time enjoying the film itself. She called the film "a little sexist", claiming that the film "paints the women as shrews, as humorless and uptight, and it paints the men as lovable, goofy, fun-loving guys." Apatow and Rogen were reportedly not pleased with Heigl's interview. Rogen said that he enjoyed working with Heigl and was stung by her comments. Heigl's comments generated a widespread reaction in the media. In an interview with People magazine, Heigl said:

My motive was to encourage other women like myself to not take that element of the movie too seriously, and to remember that it's a broad comedy"; and added, "Although I stand behind my opinion, I'm disheartened that it has become the focus of my experience with the movie."

There was some speculation that Heigl might be leaving Grey's Anatomy after the end of its fifth season. This speculation revolved around her refusal to submit her name for Emmy consideration for the previous season. Heigl had disagreements with the character's direction in the fourth season, deeming the storyline involving Izzie's affair with George a "ratings ploy" that served to be "shocking" and others speculated she would leave due to the time devotion in producing a film version of Carolyn Jessop's book Escape. Heigl said publicly that she'd opted out of the Emmy race that year because she felt the material she'd received didn't warrant Emmy consideration. The comment reportedly angered the show's producers and writers, who interpreted it as a slight on their work. Grey's showrunner Shonda Rhimes said she was not insulted by Heigl's Emmy withdrawal, and noted that Heigl's character was downplayed during the season because Heigl had asked for a lighter work schedule. Despite Heigl's reported displeasure with the previous season, and persistent rumors that her character had died, ABC confirmed that Heigl would return for the sixth season of Grey's.

Heigl starred with Gerard Butler in The Ugly Truth (2009). The film was made on a budget of $38 million and earned $205 million at the worldwide box office.

Speculation as to whether Heigl would leave Grey's Anatomy persisted through most of season six. On March 11, 2010, Heigl reportedly did not show up for work on the show, and Heigl and series creator Shonda Rhimes subsequently reached an agreement to immediately release Heigl from her contract. As a result, Heigl's appearance on the January 21 episode of Grey's Anatomy was her final appearance of that season and, thus far, in the series. Heigl said that she left the show to focus not on her film career, but on her family. The backlash over Heigl's comments on Knocked Up and Grey's Anatomy has given Heigl a reputation of being difficult to work with which was seen to have damaged her career.

=== 2010–2013: Further rom-com roles ===
In June 2010, Heigl starred in the Lionsgate comedy-thriller Killers, with Ashton Kutcher. She next starred in and produced the big-screen drama Life As We Know It, directed by Greg Berlanti, which revolved around a woman and a man whose respective best friends die in a car accident. Following the deaths, they begin to share in caring for their late friends' orphaned daughter. Heigl received $12 million for both films.

In 2011, Heigl appeared in the ensemble romantic comedy New Year's Eve, directed by Garry Marshall. Despite being a commercial success, grossing over $142 million worldwide, the film received generally negative reviews. Heigl next had the lead role in One for the Money (2012). Based on a series of novels by Janet Evanovich, the film's lead character is Stephanie Plum, a bounty hunter working for a bonding company. The film was a financial failure, grossing just over $36 million worldwide against its production budget of $40 million. For her performance, Heigl received a Golden Raspberry Award nomination for Worst Actress.

In January 2012, Heigl disclosed her enthusiastic desires to reprise her role on Grey's Anatomy and wrap up Izzie's storyline, conceiving an idea of her success in another hospital after floundering in the fictional Seattle Grace hospital where she was 'one step behind the eight ball'. She admitted to regretting leaving the show. She complimented the great work environment and family dynamic of the cast but also stated, "I completely understand if it doesn't necessarily work ... They've got a lot of storylines going on there."

In 2013, she appeared alongside Robert De Niro, Susan Sarandon and Diane Keaton in The Big Wedding, a comedy about an estranged family reuniting for a ceremony. A very poor critical and commercial reception greeted the film upon its release – it holds a 7% rating on film review aggregator Rotten Tomatoes and only made US$7.5 million in its opening weekend – and for her role, Heigl was nominated for Worst Supporting Actress at the 34th Golden Raspberry Awards. In June 2013, she began appearing in a television commercial for Vicks' ZzzQuil.

=== 2014–2019: Departure from romcoms and television resurgence ===
In 2014, Heigl admitted to Marie Claire magazine that while she loves romantic comedies and was "so stoked to be doing them", she "hit it a little too hard," professing "I couldn't say no. There's nothing wrong with them, but maybe I overloaded my audience. I should have done a superhero movie or a psychological thriller." During this period of time, Heigl broke away from her conventional romcom roles, pursuing romantic dramas, doing voiceover work, dark comedies and returning to dramatic television.

Heigl starred in the romantic drama Jackie & Ryan (2014), opposite Ben Barnes, portraying a recent single mom battling to hold onto her daughter and the love interest of a modern-day train hopper. The film was released in a limited release and through video on demand by Entertainment One in the United States. She also voice-acted the squirrel Andie in the animated film The Nut Job which was released on January 17, 2014. She reprised her role in its 2017 sequel, The Nut Job 2: Nutty by Nature which was released theatrically on August 11, 2017.

She next starred as a rejected and jealous housewife in the dark comedy Home Sweet Hell (2015), alongside Patrick Wilson and Jordana Brewster. Released for VOD and a limited theatrical run in North America, the film received largely negative reviews. Variety wrote in its verdict: "Considering how often [Heigl] has been slammed for not being just another docile, eager-to-please female celebrity, it's hard not to suspect that she might have relished the chance to play an unapologetically ball-busting shrew – a grotesquely exaggerated version of a stereotype she's been assigned many times over. Indeed, Heigl's performance as a coolly murderous model housewife is the only real reason to even consider watching Home Sweet Hell, an otherwise flailing and risible tale of adultery, extortion and suburban malaise that suggests a poor woman's Gone Girl". She received a Golden Raspberry Award nomination for Worst Actress.

In 2015, Heigl starred as the titular role in the independent film Jenny's Wedding, about a woman who finally decides to get married, but her choice of partner tears her conventional family apart. An Indiegogo campaign was later launched to help raise money for post-production costs, and like Heigl's previous few projects, the film was distributed for a VOD and limited release in certain parts of the United States only.

She starred opposite Rosario Dawson and Geoff Stults in the erotic thriller Unforgettable (2017), portraying a divorcée who torments the new fiancée of her ex-husband. The film was her first wide release in three years; it garnered mediocre reviews and grossed a paltry US$4.7 million in its opening weekend. Nevertheless, The Globe and Mail remarked that "Heigl works overtime to humanize the resentful mom – her face is like an old-fashioned cash register with the prices popping up – but she's more fun to watch as the story grows ugly and violent, and she unleashes the demon within".

Heigl's lead roles in the 2014–15 NBC political drama series State of Affairs and CBS 2017 legal drama Doubt were both cancelled after one season. However, unlike State of Affairs, Doubt premiered to what was described as "tepid" ratings by The Hollywood Reporter, and CBS announced its cancellation after just two episodes, later burning out its episodes.

Heigl returned to form when she was cast in the USA Network legal drama series Suits, playing the role of Samantha Wheeler, a new partner at the fictional law firm of Zane Specter Litt. Heigl remained on the show for its final two seasons.

=== 2020–present: professional expansion, Firefly Lane, Woodhull, and reunion with co-stars ===
Heigl was later cast in the leading role opposite Sarah Chalke and Ben Lawson for the Netflix show Firefly Lane, released in 2021. Heigl is also executive producer. The series was a success and renewed for a second season. Also that year, Heigl co-starred in Fear of Rain, a psychological thriller written and directed by Castille Landon. Harry Connick Jr., Madison Iseman and Israel Broussard completed the cast. In December 2020, it was announced that Heigl will star and executive produce again with the limited series Woodhull. She is set to portray the first female candidate for the presidency of the United States, Victoria Woodhull.

In January 2021, Heigl declared in an interview with The Washington Post promoting Firefly Lane that she was "done apologizing" for her past reputation and criticized being labelled as "difficult" in the late 2000s and early 2010s. She also acknowledged how it may have impacted her career. Her 27 Dresses co-star James Marsden defended the actress' "courage" and "strong convictions" and remarked unsurprised at her career expanding role in executive production. In September 2021, she endorsed the IATSE strike and remarked heavy criticism for speaking up about the harsh working conditions on the set of Grey's Anatomy that the crew endured, while also commenting on health and safety failures in long-hour productions. In 2022, her former co-star Ellen Pompeo stated in a podcast that Heigl would have been branded a "hero" today for her 2009 remarks about their 17-hour workday. She further stated, "But she’s ahead of her time, made a statement about our crazy hours and of course, [it was like] ‘Let’s slam a woman and call her ungrateful.'"

In the summer of 2023, Heigl and her former co-star Ellen Pompeo reunited on Variety Studio: Actors on Actors, where they talked about their time on Grey's Anatomy and Heigl's departure from the show, among other things. Heigl said: “I was so naive. I got on my soapbox, and I had some things to say, and I felt really passionate about this stuff. I felt really strong. I felt so strongly that I also got a megaphone out on my soapbox. There was no part of me that imagined a bad reaction. I felt really justified in how I felt about it and where I was coming from. I've spent most of my life – I think most women do – being in that people-pleasing mode. It's really disconcerting when you feel like you have really displeased everybody. It was not my intention to do so, but I had some things to say, and I didn’t think I was going to get such a strong reaction.” Pompeo responded: “You know what I love? There are two roles women fit into, victim or villain. And the women who are victims are only victims because they don't have the guts to be the villain."

In January 2024, Heigl joined her former Grey's Anatomy colleagues Ellen Pompeo, Chandra Wilson, Justin Chambers and James Pickens Jr. at the 75th Primetime Emmy Awards to present the award for Outstanding Supporting Actor in a Limited or Anthology Series or Movie.

In June 2024, Heigl was a guest on Shannen Doherty's podcast Let's Be Clear..with Shannen Doherty where they talked about how they lived against the negative labels placed on them in Hollywood and how important it is to them to care for and keep animals properly.

== Personal life ==
In June 2006, Heigl became engaged to singer Josh Kelley, whom she had met a year earlier on the set of his music video for "Only You". They chose not to live together before they were married, with Heigl later explaining, "I think I just wanted to save something for the actual marriage... I wanted there to be something to make the actual marriage different than the dating or the courtship." They were married on December 23, 2007, in Park City, Utah. They live with their children in Oakley, Utah.

In September 2009, the couple adopted a daughter from South Korea, the birthplace of Heigl's sister Meg. She was born with a heart defect and underwent open-heart surgery before leaving South Korea. In April 2012, Kelley and Heigl adopted a second daughter from the U.S. In June 2016, the couple announced that they were expecting their third child. Heigl gave birth to a son on December 20, 2016.

Heigl's brother-in-law is singer Charles Kelley of the country music trio Lady A.

=== Charity work ===
Heigl has worked with Best Friends Animal Society on several projects, including their Pup My Ride program. The program transports small dogs from high-kill animal shelters to other parts of the US where there is a higher demand for such dogs. She gave a grant to Best Friends to fund a year of the program. Heigl and her mother, Nancy, started Heigl's Hounds of Hope (part of the Jason Debus Heigl Foundation), which rescues larger dogs with behavioral problems from shelters with a high kill rate. It rehabilitates them through training and other adjustments to make them suitable for re-homing. As of 2014, Heigl had eight dogs of her own.

In 2010, Heigl was honored with the ASPCA Presidential Service Award for her work and dedication to animal welfare. In 2011, Heigl appeared in a public service announcement produced by Funny or Die for the "I Hate Balls" Campaign, focused on promoting the spaying and neutering of pets. In 2012, on behalf of PETA, she signed a letter to members of the Utah legislature, urging them to reject a law that would make undercover filming in factory farms a criminal offense.

In the same year, Heigl was honored by "Congressional Coalition on Adoption Institute (CCAI)" for her dedication and commitment to adoption, and by the American Cancer Society for her work in helping to amplify the awareness of cancer-related issues through her public support of her mother's journey with the disease.

Heigl is a strong proponent of organ donation, working as a spokesperson for Donate Life America. After the death of her brother Jason, Heigl's family chose to donate Jason's organs to people needing organ transplants. Heigl was inspired by these events to later work as an activist for organ donation.

== Filmography ==
Key
†	Denotes films that have not yet been released

=== Film ===
Year	Title	Role	Notes
1992	That Night	Kathryn	
1993	King of the Hill	Christina Sebastian	
1994	My Father the Hero	Nicole Arnel	
1995	Under Siege 2: Dark Territory	Sarah Ryback	
1997	Prince Valiant	Princess Ilene	
1997	Stand-ins	Taffy	
1998	Bug Buster	Shannon Griffin	
1998	Bride of Chucky	Jade Kincaid	
2000	100 Girls	Arlene	
2001	Valentine	Shelley Fisher	
2003	Descendant	Ann Hedgerow / Emily Hedgerow	
2005	Side Effects	Karly Hert	Also executive producer
2005	The Ringer	Lynn Sheridan	
2006	Zyzzyx Road	Marissa	
2006	Caffeine	Laura	
2007	Knocked Up	Alison Scott	
2008	27 Dresses	Jane Nichols	
2009	The Ugly Truth	Abby Richter	Also executive producer
2010	Killers	Jennifer "Jen" Kornfeldt Aimes	
2010	Life as We Know It	Holly Berenson	Also executive producer
2011	New Year's Eve	Laura Carrington	Segment: "Jensen and Laura's Story"
2012	One for the Money	Stephanie Plum	Also executive producer
2013	The Big Wedding	Lyla Griffin	
2014	The Nut Job	Andie	Voice role
2014	Jackie & Ryan	Jackie Laurel	
2015	Home Sweet Hell	Mona Champagne	
2015	Jenny's Wedding	Jenny Farrell	
2017	Unforgettable	Tessa Connover	
2017	The Nut Job 2: Nutty by Nature	Andie	Voice role
2021	Fear of Rain	Michelle Burroughs	

=== Television ===
Year	Title	Role	Notes
1996	Wish Upon a Star	Alexia Wheaton	Television film
1998	The Tempest	Miranda Prosper	Television film
1999–2002	Roswell	Isabel Evans	Main role
2002	The Twilight Zone	Andrea Collins	Episode: "Cradle of Darkness"
2003	Critical Assembly	Aizy Hayward	Television film
2003	Vegas Dick	Madeline	Television film
2003	Love Comes Softly	Marty Claridge	Television film
2003	Evil Never Dies	Eve	Television film
2003	Wuthering Heights	Isabel Linton	Television film
2004	Love's Enduring Promise	Marty Claridge Davis	Television film
2005	Romy and Michele: In the Beginning	Romy White	Television film
2005–2010	Grey's Anatomy	Isobel "Izzie" Stevens	Main role (seasons 1–6)
2014–2015	State of Affairs	Charleston "Charlie" Whitney Tucker	Main role; also executive producer
2017	Doubt	Sadie Ellis	Main role
2018–2019	Suits	Samantha Wheeler	Main role (seasons 8–9)
2019	Our House	Bridget	Unsold television pilot
2021–2023	Firefly Lane	Tullulah Rose "Tully" Hart	Main cast; also executive producer

== Awards and nominations ==
Year	Award	Category	Work	Result	Ref.
1994	Young Artist Awards	Best Performance by a Youth Actress Starring in a Motion Picture	My Father the Hero	Nominated	
2000	Saturn Awards	Best Supporting Actress on Television	Roswell	Nominated	
2001	Teen Choice Awards	TV – Choice Actress	Roswell	Nominated	
2003	CAMIE Awards	Made for TV Film	Love Comes Softly	Won	
2005	CAMIE Awards	Made for TV Film	Love's Enduring Promise	Won	
2005	Screen Actors Guild Awards	Outstanding Performance by an Ensemble in a Drama Series	Grey's Anatomy	Nominated	
2006	Screen Actors Guild Awards	Outstanding Performance by an Ensemble in a Drama Series	Grey's Anatomy	Won	
2006	Teen Choice Awards	TV – Choice Actress: Drama/Action Adventure	Grey's Anatomy	Nominated	
2007	Screen Actors Guild Awards	Outstanding Performance by an Ensemble in a Drama Series	Grey's Anatomy	Nominated	
2007	Emmy Awards	Outstanding Supporting Actress in a Drama Series	Grey's Anatomy	Won	
2007	Golden Globe Awards	Best Supporting Actress – Series, Miniseries or Television Film	Grey's Anatomy	Nominated	
2007	Teen Choice Awards	Choice TV Actress: Drama	Grey's Anatomy	Nominated	
2007	Teen Choice Awards	Choice Movie Actress – Comedy	Knocked Up	Nominated	
2007	Young Hollywood Awards	Superstar Of Tomorrow	Herself	Won	
2007	St. Louis Gateway Film Critics Association Awards	Best Supporting Actress	Knocked Up	Nominated	
2007	Satellite Awards	Best Actress in a Motion Picture, Comedy or Musical	Knocked Up	Nominated	
2008	Empire Awards	Best Actress	Knocked Up	Nominated	
2008	MTV Movie Awards	Best Female Performance	Knocked Up	Nominated	
2008	Teen Choice Awards	Choice TV Actress: Drama	Grey's Anatomy	Nominated	
2008	Golden Globe Awards	Best Supporting Actress – Series, Miniseries or Television Film	Grey's Anatomy	Nominated	
2008	People's Choice Awards	Favorite Female TV Star	Grey's Anatomy	Won	
2009	Teen Choice Awards	Choice Summer Movie Star: Female	The Ugly Truth	Nominated	
2009	Satellite Awards	Best Actress in a Motion Picture, Comedy or Musical	The Ugly Truth	Nominated	
2009	Alliance of Women Film Journalists	Actress Most in Need of a New Agent	One for the Money	Nominated	
2010	People's Choice Awards	Favorite TV Drama Actress	Grey's Anatomy	Won	
2010	ShoWest Motion Picture Industry Convention	Female Star Of The Year	Herself	Won	
2011	People's Choice Awards	Favorite Movie Actress	Life as We Know It	Nominated	
2012	Alliance of Women Film Journalists	Actress Most in Need of a New Agent	One for the Money	Won/Tied	
2015	BTVA Feature Film Voice Acting Award	Best Female Lead Vocal Performance in a Feature Film	The Nut Job	Nominated	
