= CAMIE Awards =

Film awards

- Awarded for: Character and Morality in Entertainment
- Country: United States
- Presented by: CAMIE Awards, Inc.
- First award: February 20, 2001 (to honor achievements of 1999/2000)
- Website: http://www.camieawards.org/

The CAMIE Awards, sometimes known as the CAMIEs, were awards for outstanding, uplifting films emphasizing character and morality. They were awarded annually by CAMIE Awards, Inc., between 2001 and 2010.

== Overview ==
The word CAMIE is an acronym for "Character And Morality In Entertainment". The CAMIE awards were given to films which emphasize character and morality. They were established to "encourage the production and awareness of outstanding, uplifting, and entertaining motion pictures with positive role models for building character, overcoming adversity, correcting unwise choices, strengthening families, living moral lives, and solving life’s problems with integrity and perseverance." In the annual awards show, rather than giving "best actor" or "best film" awards, the CAMIEs gave each film 10 statues to be divided among people who contributed at all levels of production. including both actors and film-makers. In addition to the film awards, special awards were also sometimes given; Richard Dutcher received one such award at the 2001 ceremony.

== History and organization ==
The CAMIEs were founded in 2001 by Dr. Glen C. Griffin, who also founded a companion movie-reviewing site, Moviepicks.org.

CAMIE Awards, Inc., was led by a Board of Trustees, composed of

- Dr. Glen C. Griffin, Founder and Chairman
- Dr. R. Christopher Barden, President
- Richard D. Bradford
- Janet Lee Chamberlain
- Jeffery Goddard
- Craig F. McCullough
- Levor Oldham

The Board of Trustees was assisted by an Advisory Board, which contained such notables as (not a complete list)

- Billy Davis, Jr.
- Debby Boone
- Chris Cannon
- Leanza Cornett
- Dr. Rodger Dean Duncan
- Danny Gans
- Clint Holmes
- Olivia Hussey
- Shirley Jones
- Rabbi Daniel Lapin
- Marilyn McCoo
- Michael Medved
- Gerald Molen
- Alan Osmond
- Dr. Laura Schlessinger
- Leigh Steinberg
- Mark Steines
- Jon Voight

Sean Hannity was also formerly on the advisory board.

== The Awards ==
2001 CAMIE Winners, for films released in 1999/2000 - Ceremony held Feb 20, 2001, at Memorial House in Salt Lake City.

- Theatrical Releases
  - Remember the Titans
  - Toy Story 2
- Made for TV
  - Anne of Green Gables: The Continuing Story
  - A Season for Miracles
  - The Last Dance
  - The Loretta Claiborne Story
  - The Lost Child
  - The Miracle Worker

2003 CAMIE Winners, for films released in 2001/2002

- Theatrical Releases
  - The Other Side of Heaven
  - The Rookie
- Made for TV
  - Love Comes Softly
  - Miss Lettie and Me
  - The Locket

2005 CAMIE Winners, for films released in 2003/2004 - Ceremony held Jan 29, 2005 at the Hollywood Renaissance theater in Hollywood.

- Theatrical Releases
  - Miracle
  - Radio
  - Saints and Soldiers
- Made for TV
  - Fallen Angel
  - Love's Enduring Promise
  - Secret Santa

2006 CAMIE Winners, for films released in 2005, at the Wilshire Theater in Beverly Hills

- Theatrical Releases
  - Dreamer
  - I am David
  - March of the Penguins
  - Pride & Prejudice
  - The Chronicles of Narnia: The Lion, the Witch, and the Wardrobe
  - The Greatest Game Ever Played
- Made for TV
  - Love’s Long Journey
  - Pope John Paul II
  - The Magic of Ordinary Days
  - The Reading Room

2007 CAMIE Winners, for films released in 2006 - Ceremony held May 12, 2007 at the Leonard H. Goldenson Theatre in North Hollywood.

- Theatrical Releases
  - Akeelah and the Bee
  - Charlotte's Web
  - Eight Below
  - One Night with the King
  - The Nativity Story
- Made for TV
  - Candles on Bay Street
  - Hidden Places
  - Mother Teresa
  - The Christmas Card
  - The Water is Wide

2008 CAMIE Winners, primarily for films released in 2007 - Ceremony held May 3, 2008 at the Wilshire Theater in Beverly Hills

- Theatrical Releases
  - Amazing Grace
  - Bridge to Terabithia
  - Miss Potter
  - Nancy Drew
  - The Ultimate Gift
- Made for TV
  - Crossroads: A Story of Forgivenss
  - Love's Unending Legacy
  - Pictures of Hollis Woods
  - Saving Sarah Cain
  - The Note
