= Murder 101 (film series) =

- Genre: Mystery film
- Created by: Dean Hargrove
- Starring: Dick Van Dyke; Barry Van Dyke
- Country of origin: United States
- Original language: English
- No. of episodes: 4

Production
- Executive producers: Robert Halmi Jr. Larry Levinson
- Running time: 80–84 min. (excl. commercials)
- Production companies: Alpine Medien Productions; Larry Levinson Productions

Original release
- Network: Hallmark Channel
- Release: January 7, 2006 – January 4, 2008

Murder 101 is a series of four made-for-television mystery films aired on the Hallmark Channel and the Hallmark Movie Channel. They star Dick Van Dyke and his son Barry Van Dyke. In the UK, these movies were originally aired on Channel 5.

== Films in the series ==
1. Murder 101 (pilot) – Mike and Jonathan try to prove an undercover reporter's innocence when she is accused of murdering her boss. Directed by Christian I. Nyby, written by Dean Hargrove, and produced by Kyle A. Clark and James Wilberger. (First aired January 7, 2006)

2. Murder 101: College Can Be Murder – Jonathan Maxwell investigates the murder of a prominent college professor and discovers that the man had quite a few enemies. Directed by John Putch, written by Michael Gleason, and produced by Kyle A. Clark and James Wilberger. (First aired January 29, 2007)

3. Murder 101: If Wishes Were Horses – When a horse goes missing before an important race, Maxwell decides to look into the incident in order to see what happened. Directed by David S. Cass Sr., written by Bridget Terry, and produced by Brian Gordon and Erik Olson. (First aired August 9, 2007)

4. Murder 101: The Locked Room Mystery – Dr. Maxwell and Bryant try to solve the mystery of the murder of a New Age spiritualist. Directed by David S. Cass Sr., written by Walter Klenhard, and produced by Erik Heiberg and James Wilberger. (First aired January 14, 2008)

== Characters ==
Dr. Jonathan Maxwell (Dick Van Dyke) - A criminology professor who helps solve crimes, usually because they happen directly in front of him. He takes care of the more analytical part of the crime-solving.

Mike Bryant (Barry Van Dyke) - A former cop who has become a private detective after being blackballed from the precinct. His father was close friends with Maxwell, and Bryant sees him as a father-figure. He participates in more of the action and chase scenes of the mystery solving. (Barry is the real-life son of Dick Van Dyke.)

Ben Manners (Shane Van Dyke) - First appearing in the movie "College Can Be Murder" (2007) and subsequently in "Locked Room Mystery" (2008), Ben is Mike Bryant's nephew who is studying to be a lawyer at the same college as Maxwell. However, after seeing his uncle at work, he is looking to become a private investigator. He brings more technological aspects to the sleuthing. (Shane is the real-life grandson of Dick Van Dyke and son of Barry Van Dyke.)

== Guest stars ==
Wes Van Dyke - He played students Craig and Zack in two of the movies. (Wes Van Dyke is the son of Barry Van Dyke and grandson of Dick Van Dyke.)

Carey Van Dyke - He appeared as Solar, a suspect in "Locked Room Mystery". (Carey Van Dyke is the son of Barry Van Dyke and grandson of Dick Van Dyke.)

Kimberly Quinn - She appeared in the movie "College Can Be Murder" as Kelly Fogelle. She also appeared in the TV series Diagnosis: Murder with Barry Van Dyke and Dick Van Dyke.

Challen Cates - She appeared in the movie "College Can Be Murder" as Alana. She also appeared in the TV series Diagnosis Murder with Barry Van Dyke and Dick Van Dyke.

== Home media ==
On May 16, 2017 Millcreek Entertainment released the Murder 101 Collection featuring the 3rd & 4th movies Murder 101: If Wishes Were Horses and Murder 101: The Locked Room Mystery.
