= James Tupper =

Canadian actor (born 1965)

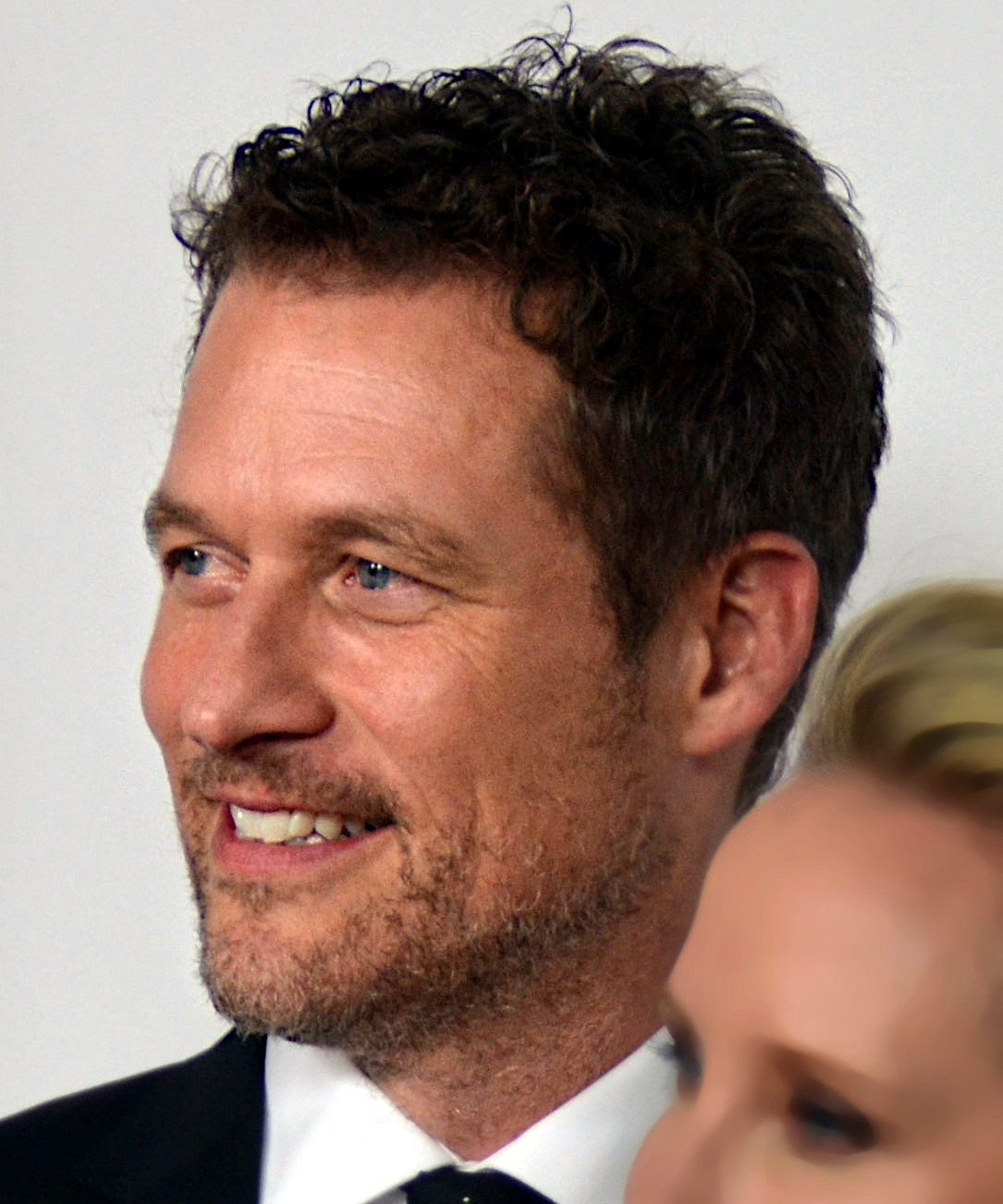
- Born: August 4, 1965 (age 61); Dartmouth, Nova Scotia, Canada
- Education: Concordia University (BFA); Rutgers University, New Brunswick (MFA)
- Occupation: Actor
- Years active: 2000–present
- Spouse: Kate Mayfield (m. 2001; sep. 2006)
- Partner: Anne Heche (2007–2018)
- Children: 1

James Tupper (born August 4, 1965) is a Canadian actor known for his roles as Jack Slattery on the ABC television series Men in Trees, Dr. Chris Sands on the NBC medical drama series Mercy, and David Clarke on ABC's Revenge. He also starred in the post-apocalyptic thriller Aftermath, on Space in Canada and Syfy in the U.S., and in the HBO series Big Little Lies.

== Early life ==
Tupper was born in Dartmouth, Nova Scotia. He studied acting at Concordia University, Montreal, and later at Rutgers University in New Jersey, where he earned a master's degree.

== Career ==
Tupper acted in several off-Broadway plays, including An Actor Prepares and After the Rain. He co-wrote and appeared in 2005's Loudmouth Soup, a fully improvised independent film that was filmed in one night with no script and no second takes.

In 2006, Tupper started portraying Jack Slattery in the ABC series Men in Trees, credited for all 36 episodes of the show's run. He then appeared as Dr. Chris Sands in the NBC medical drama Mercy for 22 episodes before it was cancelled in 2010.

Tupper appeared as Dr. Andrew Perkins, a trauma counselor, on ABC's Grey's Anatomy. He appeared in seven episodes in the show's seventh season.

Tupper appeared on ABC's Revenge from 2011 to its cancellation in 2015. He portrayed the character of David Clarke, the supposedly deceased father of the main character. His character had a recurring role for the first three seasons, appearing only in flashbacks and videos. Tupper was promoted to main cast for season four after it was revealed in the season three finale that his character was still alive.

On September 27, 2016, the British Columbia, Canada-produced post-apocalyptic action thriller Aftermath debuted on Canada's Space network and on America's Syfy network. While starring in this series, his real-life partner Anne Heche played his wife for the series. In addition to his acting role on the series, Tupper also served as co-producer. The freshman season's 13-episode run ended in December 2016; the series was not renewed.

From 2017 to 2019, Tupper had a supporting role in the HBO drama series Big Little Lies, portraying Nathan Carlson, husband of Zoë Kravitz's Bonnie Carlson and ex-husband of Reese Witherspoon's Madeline Mackenzie.

== Personal life ==
Tupper split from his wife, Kate Mayfield, in November 2006; they were still married as of early 2009. He began dating actress Anne Heche in 2007, after they met on the set of Men in Trees. They went on to also co-star in the 2008 film Toxic Skies. Their son Atlas Heche Tupper was born in March 2009. They split in January 2018. After her death in 2022, he filed an application to be executor of her estate but was denied in favor of her eldest son by her first husband.

== Filmography ==
=== Film ===
Year	Title	Role	Notes
2001	Corky Romano	FBI Agent	
2001	Joe Dirt	Cop at the Bridge	
2001	Peroxide Passion	Jed	
2005	Loudmouth Soup	Keith Miller	
2006	Invisible	Joe	
2006	Love's Abiding Joy	Henry Klein	
2008	For Heaven's Sake	Peter Whitman	
2008	Toxic Skies	Jack	
2008	Me and Orson Welles	Joseph Cotten	
2011	Mr. Popper's Penguins	Rick	
2011	Girl Fight	Ray	
2012	Playing for Keeps	Matt	
2013	Nothing Left to Fear	Dan	
2013	Decoding Annie Parker	Steven	
2016	My Sweet Audrina	Damian	
2020	Beneath Us	Ben Rhodes	
2022	The Requin	Kyle	
2023	Cold Copy		
2024	Ride	Cody	

=== Television ===
Year	Title	Role	Notes
2000	Time of Your Life	Kedrick	Episode: "The Time She Found Her Father"
2005	Gilmore Girls	Biker #1	2 episodes
2005	How I Met Your Mother	Derek	Episode: "The Limo"
2005	CSI: NY	Paul Zernecky	Episode: "Dancing with the Fishes"
2005	Love's Long Journey	Henry	TV movie
2006	Dr. Vegas	Paramedic	Episode: "Heal Thyself"
2006–2008	Men in Trees	Jack Slattery	Main role; 36 episodes
2007	Pictures of Hollis Woods	John Regan	TV movie
2008	Samantha Who?	Owen	4 episodes
2008	The Ex List	Dan	Episode: "Flower King"
2009–2010	Mercy	Dr. Chris Sands	Main role; 22 episodes
2009	A New Beginning	Chris Daniels	TV movie
2009	The Gambler, the Girl and the Gunslinger	B.J. Stoker	TV movie
2010–2011	Grey's Anatomy	Dr. Andrew Perkins	Recurring role; 7 episodes
2011–2015	Revenge	David Clarke	Recurring role (season 1–3); main role (season 4)
2013	Secret Lives of Husbands and Wives		TV movie
2014	Resurrection	Dr. Eric Ward	Recurring role
2014	Mom's Day Away	Michael Miller	TV movie
2016	Aftermath	Joshua Copeland	Lead role
2017–2019	Big Little Lies	Nathan Carlson	Main role
2017	Site Unseen: An Emma Fielding Mystery	Special Agent Jim Connor	TV movie
2018	Past Malice: An Emma Fielding Mystery	Special Agent Jim Connor	TV movie
2018	The Brave	Alex Hoffman	2 episodes
2018	American Woman	Steve Nolan	Recurring role
2018	No Apologies	Moses Fallon	TV movie
2018–2019	A Million Little Things	Andrew Pollock	Recurring role
2019	Emma Fielding: More Bitter Than Death	Special Agent John Connor	TV movie
2020	The Detectives	Detective Hank Idsinga	2 episodes
2020	The Hardy Boys	Fenton Hardy	Main role
2021	My Christmas Family Tree	Richard Hendricks	TV movie
2022	Mid-Love Crisis	Sam	TV movie
2023	Fall Into Winter	Brooks McLeod	TV movie (Great American Family)
