= Dale Midkiff =

American actor (born 1959)

- Born: Dale Alan Midkiff; July 1, 1959 (age 67); Chance, Maryland, U.S.
- Occupation: Actor
- Years active: 1985–present

Dale Alan Midkiff (born July 1, 1959) is an American actor, best known for playing Louis Creed in the horror film Pet Sematary (1989) and Captain Darien Lambert in the TV series Time Trax.

== Career ==
Midkiff acted in off-Broadway plays like Mark Medoff's The Wager. His first movie role was in Roger Corman's Streetwalkin' playing a pimp named Duke. Dale's acting was called "grittily impressive" in what some consider a B-movie classic. He has said in interviews that while his family never quite understood his interest in acting, they never discouraged him: "I love them for allowing a kid to believe in his dreams."

His first major break came when he landed the role of the young Jock Ewing in Dallas: The Early Years. That was followed by what many consider his biggest role to date, Elvis Presley, in the four-hour miniseries, Elvis and Me, and by Dream Street, a short-lived "blue collar" series set in New Jersey. Midkiff's roles have run the gamut from the wife beater in A Cry For Help: The Tracey Thurman Story, to the "good old boy" cop who discovers his partner/best friend is a murderer in Vigilante Cop, to the heroic time-traveling fugitive retrieval cop in Time Trax, to the amiable ladies' man and town protector in The Magnificent Seven. He is well known for having played the lead role of Louis Creed in the 1989 film version of Stephen King's Pet Sematary. He also starred in the Hallmark movie classic Love Comes Softly with Katherine Heigl.

== Filmography ==
Film and television
Year	Title	Role	Notes
1985	Streetwalkin'	"Duke"	
1986	Dallas: The Early Years	John Ross "Jock" Ewing	TV film
1986	Nightmare Weekend	Ken	
1987	Top Kids	Clyde Barrow	TV film
1988	Casual Sex?	Attractive Stranger	
1988	Elvis and Me	Elvis Presley	TV film
1989	A Cry for Help: The Tracey Thurman Story	Charles "Buck" Thurman	TV film
1989	Pet Sematary	Dr. Louis Creed	
1989	Dream Street	Denis DeBeau	6 episodes
1991	Black Mail	Scott Mayfield	TV film
1991	Plymouth	Gil Eaton	TV film
1991	Shoot First: A Cop's Vengeance	Farrell Tucker	TV film
1991	Sins of the Mother	Kevin Coe	TV film
1991	The Marla Hanson Story – Face Value	Eric Warner	TV film
1992	Love Potion No. 9	Gary Logan	
1993	Time Trax	Darien Lambert	44 episodes
1994	Sweet Justice – The Power of Darkness: Part 1 & Part 2	Alex Boudreau	Miniseries
1994	A Burning Passion: The Margaret Mitchell Story	"Red"	TV film
1995	Visitors of the Night	Sheriff Marcus Ashley	TV film
1995	A Child Is Missing	Peter Barnes	TV film
1996	Ed McBain's 87th Precinct: Ice	Detective Steve Carella	TV film
1997	Toothless	Thomas Jameson	TV film
1997	Any Place But Home	Carl Miller	TV film
1997	Ed McBain's 87th Precinct: Heatwave	Detective Steve Carella	TV film
1998	Conversations in Limbo	Unknown	Short film
1998	The Magnificent Seven	Buck Wilmington	22 episodes
1999	The Outer Limits	Tom Cooper	Episode: "Blank Slate"
2000	Twice in a Lifetime	Reese	Episode: "The Frat Pack"
2000	Mysterious Ways	Jack Kestler	Episode: "Spirit Junction"
2000	Alien Fury: Countdown to Invasion	Bill Templer	TV film
2000	Another Woman's Husband	Johnny Miller / Jake	TV film
2000	The Crow: Salvation	Detective Vincent Erlich	
2000	Air Bud: World Pup	Patrick	Direct-to-video
2000	Falcon Down	Captain Hank Thomas	
2001	Route 666	Deputy U.S. Marshal P.T.	
2001	CSI: Crime Scene Investigation	Professor Robert Woodbury	Episode: "Chaos Theory"
2001	The Warden	Murphy	TV film
2002	Nancy Drew	Jim "Jimbo" Mitchell	TV film
2002	Video Voyeur: The Susan Wilson Story	Gary Wilson	TV film
2003	Love Comes Softly	Clark Davis	TV film
2003	Maximum Velocity	Dr. Timothy Briggs	
2004	Love's Enduring Promise	Clark Davis	TV film
2004	Torn Apart	Jerry Bender	
2004	Debating Robert Lee	Robert Lee	
2005	Back to You and Me	Gus Martin	TV film
2005	Love's Long Journey	Clark Davis	TV film
2005	Behind the magic of Knights of Impossingworth Park	Prince Darkindeed	Short film
2005	Deep Rescue	Ben	
2005	Without a Trace	Eddie Ferguson	Episode: "Transitions"
2006	Love's Abiding Joy	Clark Davis	TV film
2006	Crossing Jordan	Jerry Miller	Episode: "Save Me"
2007	Dexter	Mr. Wilson	Episode: "That Night, A Forest Grew"
2007	Love's Unending Legacy	Clark Davis	TV film
2007	Boxboarders!	Bruce Rockwell	
2007	CSI: Miami	Doug McClain	Episode: "Deep Freeze"
2007	Love's Unfolding Dream	Clark Davis	TV film
2007	Totally Baked	Doug	
2007	Love's Unending Legacy	Clark Davis	TV film
2007	Flight of the Living Dead: Outbreak on a Plane	Dr. Lucas Thorp	
2008	Lincoln Heights	Harrison DeVries	Episode: "Ode to Joy"
2008	The Clean-Up Crew	Dan Dahler	Short film
2008	2012: Doomsday	Dr. Frank Richards	
2009	Lie to Me	Samuel Wynn	Episode: "Control Factor"
2009	Criminal Minds	Gil Bonner	Episode: "Roadkill"
2011	Hell's Kitty	Rosemary Carrie	Episode: "Rosemary Carrie"
2013	The Client List	J.D. Whitman Sr.	Episode: "Hell on Heels"
2014	Castle	Sheriff	Episode: "Once Upon a Time in the West"
2017	Unearthed & Untold: The Path to Pet Sematary	Himself	Documentary film
2018	Hell's Kitty	Rosemary Carrie	
2020	21 Outs	Coach Chris Forbes	

=== Video games ===
Year	Title	Role	Notes
2007	Ed McBain's 87th Precinct: Cold River	Detective Steve Carella	
