= Love Comes Softly =

2003 American made for TV drama film

- Written by: Cindy Kelly; Michael Landon Jr. Janette Oke
- Directed by: Michael Landon Jr.
- Starring: Katherine Heigl; Dale Midkiff; Skye McCole Bartusiak; Corbin Bernsen; Theresa Russell; Oliver Macready
- Theme music composer: William Ashford; Ken Thorne
- Country of origin: United States
- Original language: English

Production
- Producers: Kevin Bocarde; Kyle Clark
- Editor: Colleen Halsey
- Running time: 88 min.

Original release
- Network: Hallmark Channel
- Release: April 13, 2003

Related
- Love's Everlasting Courage; Love's Enduring Promise

Love Comes Softly is a 2003 made-for-television Christian drama film set in the 19th century, based on a series of books by Janette Oke. It originally aired on Hallmark Channel on April 13, 2003. It was directed by Michael Landon Jr.. It stars Katherine Heigl as a young woman named Marty Claridge and Dale Midkiff as a widower named Clark Davis.

It is the first in a series of television movies made for Hallmark Channel based on the books and produced for Hallmark by Larry Levinson Productions. The order of the films are the 8 originals followed by the 3 prequels:

1. Love Comes Softly (2003)
2. Love's Enduring Promise (2004)
3. Love's Long Journey (2005)
4. Love's Abiding Joy (2006)
5. Love's Unending Legacy (2007)
6. Love's Unfolding Dream (2007)
7. Love Takes Wing (2009)
8. Love Finds a Home (2009)
9. Love Begins (2011)
10. Love's Everlasting Courage (2011)
11. Love's Christmas Journey (2011)

== Plot ==
Marty Claridge (Katherine Heigl) has just moved out to the West with her husband Aaron Claridge (Oliver Macready), who dies in a riding accident shortly after. Expecting her late husband's baby, Marty has nowhere to go and needs a place to stay through the winter. Desperate, she accepts the proposal offered by widower Clark Davis (Dale Midkiff). Clark offers to give her a place to stay for the winter and provide her with the fare for the wagon train heading back East in the spring. In exchange, Marty agrees to marry Clark and provide a maternal influence for his young daughter Missie (Skye McCole Bartusiak). Since the marriage is in name only, the pair keep separate quarters. Initially, it is not an ideal arrangement for any of them, and Missie, (regretting her dead Mother who, as she says to her, "was the prettiest thing you've ever saw, everybody said so") resents Marty for attempting to encourage more feminine behavior from her. As winter passes, Marty learns more about "Clark's God" than she ever dreamed and an affectionate bond develops between her and Missie, allowing them all to begin to feel more like a family. Marty and Clark finally come to realize that they have both done what they thought was impossible: they have found love again. Missie has started to read Marty's books on her way of personal growth and individuation and found a new loving mother in the newcome stranger and Marty's baby is blessed with a wonderful new father.

== Cast ==
Actor	Role
Katherine Heigl	Marty Claridge
Dale Midkiff	Clark Davis
Skye McCole Bartusiak	Missie Davis
Corbin Bernsen	Ben Graham
Theresa Russell	Sarah Graham
Oliver Macready	Aaron Claridge
Adam Loeffler	Clint Graham
Nick Scoggin	Reverend Johnson
Rutanya Alda	Wanda Marshall
Tiffany Amber Knight	Laura Graham
Jaimz Woolvett	Wagon Train Scout

== Differences from the novel ==
- In the Love Comes Softly novel, Missie is a toddler, turning two years old soon after Marty moves in; she is nine in the movie. Clark and Marty are also older in the film than in the novel.
- Marty's husband is named Clem in the novel but is named Aaron in the film.
- The Grahams have 13 (11 living, two deceased) children in the novel. Ben Graham was a widower with four children, and Sarah Graham was a widow with three, one that died at age 7. They then had 6 together, one of which they lost in infancy. This is mentioned in Chapter 11 of the book. In the film, they only have four: Ben's two sons and Sarah's two daughters. In the novel, Sarah is only referred to as "Ma Graham" or Mrs. Graham. Laura is Ben's daughter in the novel and Sarah's in the film.

== Awards ==
The following people took home a CAMIE Awards in 2003 for their part in the film:

- Michael Landon Jr. (director/writer)
- Cindy Kelley (writer)
- Janette Oke (original story)
- Larry Levinson (executive producer)
- Robert Halmi Jr. (executive producer)
- Dale Midkiff (actor)
- Katherine Heigl (actress)
- Skye McCole Bartusiak (actress)

In 2004 Dale Midkiff won the Grace Award from MovieGuide for Most Inspirational Television Acting.
