= Janette Oke =

Canadian author of inspirational fiction (born 1935)

- Born: Janette Steeves; February 18, 1935 (age 91); Champion, Alberta, Canada
- Occupation: Novelist
- Writing career
- Genre: inspirational fiction
- Website: www.janetteoke.com

Janette Oke (née Steeves; born February 18, 1935) (pronounced "oak") is a Canadian author of inspirational fiction. Her books are often set in a pioneer era and centered on female protagonists. Her first novel, Love Comes Softly, was published by Bethany House in 1979. As of September 2016, more than 75 others have followed. The first novel of her Canadian West series, When Calls the Heart (1983), became the basis of the current television series of the same name.

== Biography ==
Janette Steeves was born in Champion, Alberta, to Canadian prairie farmers Fred and Amy Steeves, during the Great Depression years.

Oke graduated from Mountain View Bible College in Didsbury, Alberta, where she met her future husband, Edward Oke, who later became the president of that college. The Okes have four children, 3 sons and 1 daughter. Oke's daughter has written several books alongside her mother.

Oke is a committed Evangelical Christian. She has written many books about her faith.

== Awards ==
Oke received the 1992 President's Award from the Evangelical Christian Publishers Association for her significant contribution to Christian fiction, as well as the 1999 CBA Life Impact Award, and the Gold Medallion Award for fiction.

== List of books by Janette Oke ==
=== Love Comes Softly series ===
This series is published by Bethany House.

1. Love Comes Softly, 1979
2. Love's Enduring Promise, 1980
3. Love's Long Journey, 1982
4. Love's Abiding Joy, 1983
5. Love's Unending Legacy, 1984
6. Love's Unfolding Dream, 1987
7. Love Takes Wing, 1988
8. Love Finds a Home, 1989

This series has also been published into two boxsets, Volume 1–4 and Volume 5–8. New revisions with updated covers were published in 2003 and 2004, including the boxsets.

The Fox Faith film versions of the "Love Comes Softly" series, which aired on the Hallmark Channel, do not completely follow the books. They starred Katherine Heigl, Dale Midkiff, Corbin Bernsen, Erin Cottrell, and others. Directors of the films included Michael Landon Jr. and Lou Diamond Phillips.

There are also three prequels titled Love Begins (2011), Love's Everlasting Courage (2011) and Love's Christmas Journey (2012).

=== A Prairie Legacy series ===
This series is published by Bethany House.

1. The Tender Years, 1997
2. A Searching Heart, 1998
3. A Quiet Strength, 1999
4. Like Gold Refined, 2000

This is a follow-up to the Love Comes Softly series. A republished edition is now available.

=== Seasons of the Heart series ===
This series is published by Bethany House.

1. Once Upon a Summer, 1981
2. The Winds of Autumn, 1987
3. Winter Is Not Forever, 1988
4. Spring's Gentle Promise, 1989

This series was republished in 2002 with updated covers. It is about a young boy, Josh Jones, who is trying to find himself with his atypical family.

=== Canadian West series ===
This series is published by Bethany House. The last two books came much later and focus on the children in the series rather than the main characters of the first four books. In 2015 all six books were released as a single ebook.

1. When Calls the Heart, 1983
2. When Comes the Spring, 1985
3. When Breaks the Dawn, 1985
4. When Hope Springs New, 1986
5. Beyond the Gathering Storm, 1999
6. When Tomorrow Comes, 2000

=== Return to the Canadian West series ===
This series is published by Bethany House. The series is co-written by Janette Oke and her daughter, Laurel Oke Logan.

1. Where Courage Calls, 2014
2. Where Trust Lies, 2015
3. Where Hope Prevails, 2016

=== When Hope Calls series ===
Co-written with Laurel Oke Logan

1. Unyielding Hope, 2020
2. Sustaining Faith, 2021
3. Unfailing Love, 2022

=== Song of Acadia series ===
Co-written with T. Davis Bunn and published by Bethany House.

1. The Meeting Place, 1999
2. The Sacred Shore, 2000
3. The Birthright, 2001
4. The Distant Beacon, 2002
5. The Beloved Land, 2002

This series is continued on by T. Davis Bunn and Isabella Bunn in the follow-up series, Heirs of Acadia.

=== Acts of Faith series ===
Co-written with T. Davis Bunn and published by Bethany House.

- The Centurion's Wife, 2009
- The Hidden Flame, January 2010
- The Damascus Way, 2011

=== Standalone books ===
- Return to Harmony, co-written with T. Davis Bunn
- Another Homecoming, co-written with T. Davis Bunn
- Tomorrow's Dream, co-written with T. Davis Bunn
- Dana's Valley, co-written with Laurel Oke Logan
- The Pharisee's Wife

==== Women of the West books ====
These books are standalone novels about different women of the West, where the author's intention is that they do not need to be read in order.

- The Calling of Emily Evans, 1990
- Julia's Last Hope, 1990
- Roses for Mama, 1990
- A Woman Named Dâmaris, 1991
- They Called Her Mrs. Doc, 1992
- The Measure of a Heart, 1992
- A Bride for Donnigan, 1993
- Heart of the Wilderness, 1993
- Too Long a Stranger, 1994
- The Bluebird and the Sparrow, 1995
- A Gown of Spanish Lace, 1995
- Drums of Change, 1995

=== Youth books ===
- I Wonder… Did Jesus Have a Pet Lamb? (picture book)

=== Janette Oke's Animal Friends series ===
1. The Impatient Turtle
2. The Prodigal Cat
3. Spunky's Diary
4. This Little Pig
5. New Kid in Town
6. Ducktails
7. Prairie Dog Town
8. Trouble in a Fur Coat
9. Maury Had a Little Lamb
10. Pordy's Prickly Problem
11. A Cote of Many Colors
12. Who's New at the Zoo?
- Janette Oke's Animal Friends Pack, vols. 1–6
- Janette Oke's Animal Friends Pack, vols. 7–12

== Other items by Janette Oke ==
- Celebrating the Inner Beauty of Women Dec 1997
- Father Who Calls: Devotional insights for Daily Meditations
- Hunger of Your Heart: Finding Fulfillment Through a Closer Walk With God
- Janette Oke Engagement Diary
- Janette Oke 2001 Engagement Diary (Calendar)
- Janette Oke's Reflections on the Christmas Story
- Making Memories by Janette Oke and Cheri Bladholm
- My favorite recipes: Featuring devotional & selected recipes
- My Favorite Verse
- The Father of Love
- The Loving Heart-Calendar
- What Does Love Look Like by Janette Oke and Cheri Bladholm
- Nana's Gift (novella) 2011
