= Michael Landon Jr. =

American actor and director

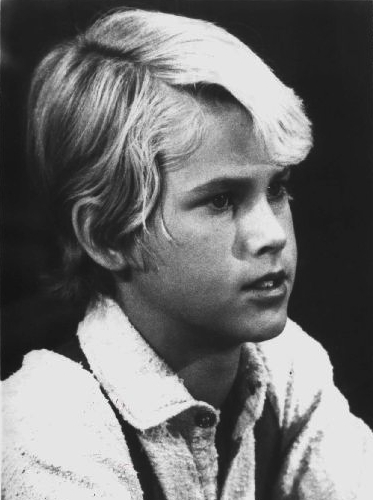
- Landon on Little House on the Prairie c. 1977
- Born: Michael Graham Landon; June 20, 1964 (age 62); Encino, California, U.S.
- Occupations: Actor; director; writer; producer
- Years active: 1977–present
- Spouse: Sharee Gregory (m. 1987)
- Children: 3
- Parent: Michael Landon
- Relatives: Natalie Gregory (sister-in-law); Leslie Landon (sister); Christopher B. Landon (brother); Jennifer Landon (paternal half-sister); Mark Landon (adoptive brother); Rachel Matthews (niece)

Michael Graham Landon (born June 20, 1964), known as Michael Landon Jr., is an American actor, director, writer, and producer.

== Life ==
Landon Jr. is the son of actor Michael Landon and his second wife, Marjorie Lynn Noe. He is the brother of Christopher B. Landon, Leslie Landon, Shawna Landon, and the half-brother of Cheryl Lynn Landon (from his mother's first marriage) and Jennifer Landon and Sean Landon (from his father's third marriage). His paternal grandfather was Jewish, whereas his paternal grandmother was Catholic, although his father was raised Jewish.

He married actress Sharee Gregory in December 1987. They have three children: daughters Ashley and Brittany and son Austin. Sharee Gregory is the older sister of former child actress Natalie Gregory.

Landon converted to Christianity at the age of 18.

== Filmography ==
=== Acting ===
- 1977: Little House on the Prairie as Jim (episode: "The Election")
- 1988: Bonanza: The Next Generation (TV) as Benjamin 'Benj' Cartwright
- 1988: Superboy as Stretch (episode: "The Fixer")
- 1993: Back to Bonanza (TV) as Host
- 1993: Bonanza: The Return (TV) as Benjamin 'Benj' Cartwright
- 1995: Bonanza: Under Attack (TV) as Benjamin 'Benj' Cartwright

=== Directing ===
- 1991: Michael Landon: Memories with Laughter and Love (TV)
- 1999: Michael Landon, the Father I Knew (TV)
- 2003: Love Comes Softly (TV)
- 2004: Love's Enduring Promise (TV)
- 2005: Love's Long Journey (TV)
- 2006: Love's Abiding Joy (TV)
- 2007: Saving Sarah Cain (TV)
- 2007: The Last Sin Eater
- 2007: The Velveteen Rabbit
- 2008: Deep in the Heart
- 2011: The Shunning (TV)
- 2013: The Ultimate Life
- 2013: When Calls the Heart (TV movie)
- 2014, 2016: When Calls the Heart (TV series); 5 episodes
- 2026: Home to Harmony (TV series)

=== Writing ===
- 1993: Bonanza: The Return (TV) (story)
- 1999: Michael Landon, the Father I Knew (TV) (story)
- 2003: Love Comes Softly (TV) (teleplay)
- 2004: Love's Enduring Promise (TV) (teleplay)
- 2005: Love's Long Journey (TV) (teleplay)
- 2006: Love's Abiding Joy (teleplay) (television story)
- 2007: Love's Unfolding Dream (Teleplay)
- 2007: The Last Sin Eater (screenplay)
- 2013 When Calls the Heart (teleplay)
- 2014: When Calls the Heart; episode: "Lost & Found" (teleplay with Cindy Kelley)

=== Producing ===
- 2003: Love Comes Softly (TV) (co-executive producer)
- 2004: Love's Enduring Promise (TV) (co-executive producer)
- 2007: Saving Sarah Cain (film) (producer)
- 2007: The Last Sin Eater (producer)
- 2008: Deep in the Heart
- 2013–present: When Calls the Heart (executive producer)
- 2019, 2021: When Hope Calls (executive producer)
