= Logan Bartholomew =

American actor

- Born: John Logan Bartholomew; February 9, 1984 (age 42); Galion, Ohio, U.S.
- Other name: Logy Bear
- Occupation: Actor
- Years active: 2003-present

John Logan Bartholomew (born February 9, 1984) is an American actor born in Galion, Ohio, best known for his role of Willie LaHaye in 3 of the 8 films in the Love Comes Softly series. He later appeared in series like CSI: Miami (2005) and Close to Home (2007). He also had a small appearance in the thirty-sixth episode of popular TV series Ghost Whisperer, as Ray Peters in the second-season episode, "Speed Demon" (2007). In 2010 he played a troubled hockey player in The Genesis Code. In 2013, he took over the role of Jason Stevens from Drew Fuller, in the sequel to 2007's The Ultimate Gift, The Ultimate Life.
