= Love's Christmas Journey =

- Written by: George Tierne; Janette Oke
- Directed by: David S. Cass Sr.
- Starring: Natalie Hall; Greg Vaughan; JoBeth Williams; Sean Astin; Ernest Borgnine
- Music by: Nathan Furst
- Country of origin: United States
- Original language: English

Production
- Producer: Amanda Phillips Atkins
- Running time: 240 minutes

Original release
- Network: Hallmark Channel
- Release: November 5, 2011

Love's Christmas Journey is a 2011 made-for-television Christian drama film based on a series of books by Janette Oke. It aired on Hallmark Channel on November 5, 2011.

== Synopsis ==
The story focuses on Ellie King (née Davis) and Aaron Davis, the now adult children of Clark and Marty Davis and half-siblings of Missy Davis. There are two parts of story.

Part 1:

While mourning the loss of her husband and daughter, recently widowed Ellie King (Natalie Hall) visits her brother Aaron Davis (Greg Vaughan) and his children for Christmas. Ellie does her best to enjoy the holidays, making new friends with Mrs. Thompson (JoBeth Williams), a local shop keeper, and handsome admirer Deputy Strode (Dylan Bruce). When Aaron travels out of town to purchase land, Ellie agrees to watch his children, but the season's festivities are threatened when Aaron goes missing.

Part 2 : Ellie and a deputy work together to find him, facing challenges related to a fire and a potential frame-up, all while preparing for Christmas.

== Cast ==
Actor	Role
Natalie Hall	Ellie King
Greg Vaughan	Aaron Davis
JoBeth Williams	Mrs. Beatrice Thompson
Dylan Bruce	Deputy Michael Strode
Bobby Campo	Erik Johnson
Charles Shaughnessy	Alex Weaver
Sean Astin	Mayor Wayne
Ryan Wynott	Christopher Davis
Jada Mae Facer	Annabelle Davis
Ernest Borgnine	Nicholas
Amanda Foreman	Adrienne Wayne
Evan Helmuth	Deputy Harve
Annika Noelle	Suzanna Wayne
Dannika Liddell	Jessica King
Chad Michael Collins	Owen King
Stephen Bridgewater	Mr. Cunningham
