= Larry Levinson Productions =

US film and television production company

- Company type: Film, Television Production
- Industry: Film
- Founded: Los Angeles, CA US (April 30, 1993; 33 years ago)
- Headquarters: Los Angeles, California, U.S.
- Area served: Worldwide
- Key people: Larry Levinson (President)
- Products: Motion pictures
- Subsidiaries: Branwen Productions; Hardstone Entertainment; LLP Production Services; PixL

Larry Levinson Productions (LLP) is the production company of Larry Levinson, best known for being an American screenwriter, producer and the president of Levinson Productions. By 2016, the company had produced over 200+ films, mostly for its TV service PixL.

== History ==
The production company Larry Levinson Productions was founded by Larry Levinson in 1993 and in that same year produced its first feature-length television movie Rio Diablo, thereafter producing between two and ten TV Movies a year. Notable productions include Rough Riders, a TV mini-series based on future President of the United States Theodore Roosevelt's early life adventures with the 2nd cavalry brigade at San juan hill, and the well liked Streets of Laredo. The miniseries Rough Riders was nominated for the Lone Star Film and Television Awards for best TV actor Tom Berenger best TV Mini-series and best screen play. It also won an Emmy Award for outstanding sound editing in 1998. The miniseries Streets of Laredo was nominated for six separate awards, winning four of these including an emmy for an outstanding individual achievement in casting for a miniseries. It also won an ASC award for outstanding achievement in cinematography, a Lone Star Film and Television Award for best supporting actress Sonia Braga and a Bronze Wrangler for best television feature film. Streets of Laredo and Rough Riders were produced by LLP for NBC and TNT - both major networks; both productions had large budgets and long shooting schedules where the accent was firmly on quality.

With the expiration of RHI Entertainment's exclusive contract with Hallmark Channel, Levinson Productions became the channel's sole producer. By 2007, LLP was joined by additional producers. His PixL cable channel began carriage on Dish Network in December 2010. In March 2012, Levinson Productions moved its future productions' distribution from Sonar Entertainment, formerly RHI, to SevenOne International.

Levinson Productions began having troubles with various unions. In early 2009, LLP had drawn pickets from International Alliance of Theatrical & Stage Employees for using non-union crews on the NBC telemovie “Megastorm”. The company and RHI were filed against by Writers' Guild of America West in May 2009 for failure to paid residuals.

In 2013, LLP Production Services started the city planning approval process to expand its studio lot to the adjacent property on Smith Road, Simi Valley, California. In May 2016, the final proposal was presented to the planning commission.

== Producer ==
Larry Levinson began his career as a screenwriter on the television series Laverne & Shirley in 1982, and later in 1985, working for Cannon Entertainment, he wrote the Chuck Norris war picture Missing in Action 2.

The company was incorporated in 1993 in the state of California and has been in business for 18 years.

=== TV series ===
- McBride
- Jane Doe
- The Storm

=== Filmography ===
- Rio diablo (1993) (TV Movie)
- MacShayne (1994) (TV Movie)
- Streets of Laredo (1995) (TV Mini-series)
- Rough Riders (1997) (TV Mini-series)
- Everything that Rises (1998) (TV Movie)
- Hard Time: Hostage Hotel (1999) (TV Movie)
- Texas Rangers (2001) (TV Movie)
- Johnson County War (2002) (TV Movie)
- Santa Jr. (2002) (TV Movie)
- Night of the Wolf (2002) (TV Movie)
- Terror on the Mountain (2002) (TV Movie)
- Roughing It (2002) (TV Movie)
- Black Gold (2003) (TV Movie)
- The Last Cowboy (2003) (TV Movie)
- Straight from the Heart (2003) (TV Movie)
- Love Comes Softly (2003) (TV Movie)
- Audrey's Rain (2003) (TV Movie)
- Just Deserts (2004) (TV Movie)
- The Lady Musketeer (2004) (TV Movie)
- Wedding Daze (2004) (TV Movie)
- Frankenstein (2004) (TV Mini-series)
- Icon (2005) (TV Movie)
- King Solomon's Mines (2004)
- 50 First Dates
- Detective (2005) (TV Movie)
- Our Home (2006) (TV Movie)
- Wild Hearts (2006) (TV Movie)
- Murder 101 (2006) Hallmark Channel
- Final Approach (2007) (TV Movie)
- The Sitter (2007) (TV Movie)
- Backwoods (2007) (TV Movie)
- If Wishes Were Horses (August 18, 2007) Hallmark Channel, movie starring Dick Van Dyke, son Barry and grandson Shane
- Black Widow (2007) (TV Movie)
- Deadly Suspicion (2008) (TV Movie)
- Street Warrior (2008) (TV Movie)
- Bound By a Secret (2009)
- Chasing a Dream (2009)
- Love Finds a Miracle (2009)
- Love Finds a Home (2009)
- Relative Stranger (2009)
- The Wishing Well (2009) (TV Movie)
- After the Fall (2010) (TV Movie)
- The Wish List (2010) (TV Movie)
- The Town Christmas Forgot (2010) (TV Movie)
- Love Begins (2011) (TV Movie)
- Taste of Romance (2011) (TV Movie)
- Honeymoon for One (2011) (TV Movie)
- My George (2014) (TV Movie)
- Sweet Surrender (2014) (TV Movie)
- Cloudy with a Chance of Love (2015) (TV Movie)
- Heart of the Matter (2015) (TV Movie)
- "Portrait of Love" (2015)
- Tomboy (2018) (TV Movie)
