= List of When Calls the Heart episodes =

When Calls the Heart is a television drama series, inspired by Janette Oke's book of the same name from her Canadian West Series. Developed by Michael Landon Jr., the series began airing on the Hallmark Channel in the United States on January 11, 2014, and, in Canada, on April 16, 2014, on Super Channel.

As of March 22, 2026, 143 episodes of When Calls the Heart have been shown, including five specials, concluding the thirteenth season.

== Series overview ==
Season	Episodes	Originally shown	
Season	Episodes	First shown	Last shown
Pilot		October 19, 2013	
1	12	January 11, 2014	March 29, 2014
2	7	April 25, 2015	June 13, 2015
New Year's Wish		December 26, 2015	
3	8	February 21, 2016	April 10, 2016
Christmas		December 25, 2016	
4	10	February 19, 2017	April 23, 2017
The Christmas; Wishing Tree		December 25, 2017	
5	10	February 18, 2018	April 22, 2018
The Greatest; Christmas Wish (Blessing)		December 25, 2018	
6	9	February 24, 2019	June 2, 2019
Home for Christmas		December 25, 2019	
7	10	February 23, 2020	April 26, 2020
8	12	February 21, 2021	May 9, 2021
9	12	March 6, 2022	May 22, 2022
10	12	July 30, 2023	October 15, 2023
11	12	April 7, 2024	June 23, 2024
12	12	January 5, 2025	March 23, 2025
13	12	January 4, 2026	March 22, 2026

== Episodes ==
=== Pilot movie (2013) ===
When Calls the Heart is a two-hour pilot movie that inspired the television series. It stars Maggie Grace, Poppy Drayton, Stephen Amell, Daniel Sharman, Jean Smart and Lori Loughlin.

No. overall	Title	Directed by	Written by	Original showing	U.S. viewers (millions)
0	"When Calls the Heart"	Michael Landon Jr.	Janette Oke (book); Michael Landon Jr. (teleplay)	October 19, 2013	N/A
Elizabeth Thatcher (Drayton), a young school teacher from a rich family accepts a teaching position in rural western Coal town and reads her Aunt Elizabeth's (Grace) journals about a similar experience.

=== Season 1 (2014) ===
No. overall	No. in season	Title	Directed by	Written by	Original showing	U.S. viewers (millions)
1	1	"Lost and Found"	Michael Landon Jr.	Michael Landon Jr. & Cindy Kelley	January 11, 2014	1.69
When a wooden plank inscribed with a sentimental message is discovered in the mine, new constable Jack Thornton tries to discover the plank's rightful owner. Elizabeth struggles with capturing the enthusiasm of her students in the wake of tragedy.
2	2	"Cease And Desist"	Michael Landon Jr.	Brian Bird	January 18, 2014	1.59
When all the widows in Coal Valley receive eviction notices from the Coal Company to make way for new miner recruits, Elizabeth hatches a plan to keep the widows from moving out of the only town they know.
3	3	"A Telling Silence"	Michael Landon Jr.	Ken LaZebnik	January 25, 2014	1.39
Elizabeth helps a mute student who is struggling to cope with the death of her father. Jack investigates the mysterious circumstances surrounding the burning of Coal Valley's only church.
4	4	"Secrets and Lies"	Michael Landon Jr.	John Wierick	February 1, 2014	1.19
After finding the cans of whale oil, Jack investigates Cat Montgomery for her possible involvement in the church arson case. When the evidence points to Cat, Gabe becomes infuriated by the idea of his mother being imprisoned for something she didn't do.
5	5	"The Dance"	Anne Wheeler	Ken LaZebnik	February 8, 2014	1.50
When a group of new male miners comes to Coal Valley, many of the town's women get caught up in the idea of the single men. One of the new miners begins courting Elizabeth and Jack seems to have concerns that resemble jealousy. Abigail takes in Carla Noonan, a pregnant widow, to keep an eye on her health while Coal Valley's doctor is away.
6	6	"These Games"	Anne Wheeler	Sheryl J. Anderson	February 15, 2014	1.15
The Miners' Games allow the townspeople to cut loose and have a little fun. Elizabeth is feeling caught between overprotective Jack and new miner Billy Hamilton, but when Jack tells her he has proof Billy lied to her, Elizabeth decides she's had enough. Abigail suggests Jack try a gentler approach to reach Elizabeth. Jack also investigates a series of robberies that are plaguing Coal Valley.
7	7	"Second Chances"	Neill Fearnley	Kim Beyer-Johnson	February 22, 2014	1.15
Abigail is encouraged to reopen Coal Valley's dilapidated and abandoned cafe and make it her own after Elizabeth raves about Abigail's baking. Jack accidentally insults Elizabeth as he fumbles to confess his feelings for her. One of Elizabeth's students has trouble reading so she enlists Jack's help for a creative solution.
8	8	"Perils of the Soloists"	Neill Fearnley	Jon Nappa	March 1, 2014	1.04
Elizabeth and Abigail move into rooms above Abigail's cafe. The only surviving miner from the explosion comes home from the hospital with a shocking surprise. Elizabeth and her students must put on the Coal Valley Founders' Day play on short notice.
9	9	"Change of Heart"	Anne Wheeler	Ken Craw	March 8, 2014	1.65
Jack makes his intentions known by asking an excited Elizabeth on date. Her younger sister Julie (Charlotte Hegele) also makes a surprise visit. Julie wants to know all about Elizabeth's new life and her new romance. Elizabeth is careful with her emotions, until she sees the romantic evening at the café that he and Abigail planned for them. However, Jack has been granted a transfer to another post, which he requested upon arriving at Coal Valley. Now happy, he must break the news to Elizabeth. Meanwhile, Gowen has a sudden interest in Abigail, who mentions this to Jack. He informs her that Gowen's role in the mine explosion is being investigated. Elsewhere, a naive Julie helps an injured man shown to be a wanted outlaw.
10	10	"Love Comes First"	Neill Fearnley	Vanessa Parise	March 15, 2014	1.24
After Jack's departure from Coal Valley, Abigail learns her husband might be at fault for the mine disaster. Julie unknowingly nurses wanted outlaw Nate Tolliver back to health and gives him directions to the cabin where they met, and where his loot is stashed. Julie confides in Elizabeth about her newfound love, but a suspicious Elizabeth goes to tell Abigail, just as the trouble arrives. The Thatcher women are put in danger, and Elizabeth realizes that love is stronger than fear.
11	11	"Rules of Engagement"	Neill Fearnley	Neal Dobrofsky & Tippi Dobrofsky	March 22, 2014	2.01
After taking care of the Tollivers, hero Jack returns to Coal Valley. His ex-fiancée Rosemary LeVeaux also arrives. Rosemary broke up with him long ago to become an actress. However, she now seeks to make Coal Valley her home and Jack her husband, putting Elizabeth at odds with Jack. Meanwhile, he has asked forensic investigator and friend Bill Avery to help Abigail in regards to Gowen, the mining company and the explosion. As Bill works with Abigail, he becomes interested in her, admitting his intentions to Jack. Abigail also has the same intentions. Elizabeth receives news from home, causing her to ponder leaving Coal Valley.
12	12	"Prelude to a Kiss"	Neill Fearnley	Neal Dobrofsky & Tippi Dobrofsky	March 29, 2014	2.07
Coal Valley is finally going to get some justice for the mine explosion when Circuit Judge Jedidiah Black comes to town. Jack confronts Elizabeth about her teaching offer. Abigail begins letting go of the past and starts looking to the future with Bill Avery. Jack and Elizabeth's relationship changes in a big way.

=== Season 2 (2015) ===
No. overall	No. in season	Title	Directed by	Written by	Original showing	U.S. viewers (millions)
13	1	"Trials of the Heart"	Neill Fearnley	Neal Dobrofsky & Tippi Dobrofsky and Tony Blake & Robin Bernheim Burger	April 25, 2015	1.94
Elizabeth and Jack are closer than ever after their first kiss and Jack gains a new understanding of Elizabeth's high-society family life. Abigail confronts Bill about a shocking discovery that could put their romantic future on hold and the mining disaster trial takes a surprising turn, when a shocking witness is called to the stand, and its result creates a name change for the town.
14	2	"Heart and Soul"	Mike Rohl	Robin Bernheim Burger	May 2, 2015	1.35
Elizabeth grows nostalgic while spending time with her friend Charles in Hamilton, further complicating her feelings, while Jack returns to the renamed Hope Valley to rebuild the church and school. He enlists the help of new friend and timber tycoon Lee Coulter, who has taken interest in Jack's ex-fiancée, Rosemary. Abigail says goodbye to Bill, who claims he has a new investigation back East, but promises to return to her. Abigail is devastated after a visit from someone very close to Bill, claiming he hasn't been completely truthful. Meanwhile, conman Floyd Conklin arrives in town to swindle the hard-working residents, but is quickly mistaken for the church's new Reverend, Frank Hogan, who is expected to arrive any day. After Lee rejects Gowen's offer to work together on the new saw mill, Gowen threatens him and soon has another tactic for getting what he wants that will drastically affect the whole town. Floyd and Gowen's manipulative exploits explode in the saloon as a beloved Hope Valley couple prepares to exchange vows. Back in Hamilton, Elizabeth feels the pressure from her parents and her newly engaged sister Viola to make a decision about Charles and Jack, wondering if her adventure on the frontier prevented her from finding happiness and true love.
15	3	"Heart's Desire (Heart of the Family)"	Mike Rohl and Neill Fearnley	Andrea Stevens (Part I); Derek Thompson (Part II)	May 16, 2015	1.62
Abigail travels to Hamilton to stay with Elizabeth's family and is compelled to accept Bill's help on a personal matter. A heroic act by Jack brings him closer to Rosemary. Elizabeth returns to Hope Valley and she and Jack come together to consider what the future holds.
16	4	"Awakenings & Revelations"	Neill Fearnley	Tony Blake	May 23, 2015	1.51
Elizabeth's conflict of the heart follows her to Hope Valley when she is surprised with a visitor from Hamilton, Charles. Although he has new business with Lee at the sawmill, Elizabeth knows it is more than just a coincidence that her father sent him to town, as does Jack. As the two men attempt to hide their thinly veiled fight for Elizabeth's affections, Clara meets a charming suitor, leaving her uncertain about how her new courtship could affect Abigail. Sensing Clara is upset, Abigail goes to Pastor Frank for advice. Meanwhile, Rosemary promises Lee an evening he will never forget as she aims to get what she desires. Then, Bill Avery returns to Hope Valley and begins evading Jack's questioning about a gang of counterfeiting criminals in the region. Elizabeth ponders her romance with Jack, and confusion about Charles, putting her relationship at an emotional impasse.
17	5	"Heart and Home"	Martin Wood	Robin Bernheim Burger	May 30, 2015	1.63
Elizabeth and Jack both receive telegrams about an automobile accident involving Tom and Julie. Julie is fine, but Jack has received no word on Tom's condition. Elizabeth's family is furious and Julie is refusing to speak to anyone. Elizabeth and Jack must return to Hamilton to help in the situation. Meanwhile, Abigail tries to find forgiveness in her heart for Bill as Lee asks Rosemary's help to fight Gowen and keep Hope Valley from falling apart.
18	6	"Coming Together, Coming Apart"	Martin Wood	Tony Blake	June 6, 2015	1.52
Elizabeth and Jack, still upset after their fight, separately set out to help their younger siblings move toward a better future—apart from each other. When Tom and Julie run off together, Elizabeth enlists Jack's help to find them before they make an even bigger mistake. In Hope Valley, Gowen, still reeling from his loss in the poker game, begins pressuring Abigail to sell the café to a new investor. When Abigail refuses, Gowen conspires with Dottie to threaten Abigail into understanding the consequences. Abigail looks to Pastor Frank for guidance and finds the spark of something new with him, even as his past remains a mystery. At the same time, Lee wants something more with Rosemary, but her independence proves she isn't ready to settle down, making him reconsider his approach. In Hamilton, Jack realizes Tom's troubling behavior has roots in their past as he helps his brother say an emotional farewell. Then, a calculated offer from William makes Jack realize Elizabeth's family might never accept him for who he is, and their different worlds suddenly seem even farther apart.
19	7	"With All My Heart"	Neill Fearnley	Derek Thompson (Part I); Tony Blake & Derek Thompson (Part II)	June 13, 2015	1.78
Elizabeth and Jack return from Hamilton at odds with each other. Jack's dog Rip gets lost during storm, and they set out to find him before taking shelter in an old mine tunnel. Trapped together and narrowly escaping danger, they discuss what has been keeping them apart. Meanwhile, Gowen threatens to shut down the café if Abigail doesn't finish a long list of repairs. She is grateful when Pastor Frank offers to help – but a confession about his past could make her ponder their new connection. Then, after Jack arrests a third counterfeiter in town, Bill returns under the guise of investigating, while seemingly falling deeper into corruption. Tipped off to her husband's whereabouts, Nora arrives, hoping to mend their marriage and keep Abigail away. Nora's history with her surprising informant complicates her feelings. Finally, as Jack captures a special memory for Elizabeth and her schoolchildren, he plans a bold new proposal for their future.

=== Special (2015) ===
No. overall	Title	Directed by	Written by	Original showing	U.S. viewers (millions)
20	"New Year's Wish"	Neill Fearnley	Robin Bernheim Burger	December 26, 2015	2.49
A fresh start for Jack and Elizabeth, a surprise guest for Abigail, an adventure for Rosemary and Lee, an unwanted visitor from Pastor Hogan's past, and new beginnings for the town makes this the most unforgettable New Year's celebration Hope Valley has ever seen.

=== Season 3 (2016) ===
No. overall	No. in season	Title	Directed by	Written by	Original showing	U.S. viewers (millions)
21	1	"Troubled Hearts"	Martin Wood	Derek Thompson	February 21, 2016	1.70
Elizabeth surprises Jack with a home of her own as Abigail learns of Gowen's latest greedy scheme and Frank's past quickly closes in on him.
22	2	"A Time to Speak"	Martin Wood	Richard Manning	February 28, 2016	1.74
After the discovery that Frank is a wanted man, Hope Valley quickly turns on their pastor before Abigail sets out to prove that the mistakes of the past don't define the future.
23	3	"Heart of a Hero"	Neill Fearnley	Josef Anderson	March 6, 2016	1.76
After Hope Valley learns redemption is possible, Abigail and Frank pursue a romance before the heart of the town is tested by the threat of a gang of outlaws.
24	4	"A Gentle Heart"	Neill Fearnley	Derek Thompson	March 13, 2016	2.05
Jack and Elizabeth are stronger than ever - but as Faith prepares to make a permanent move to Hope Valley while leaning on Jack for emotional support, Elizabeth grows wary of their friendship.
25	5	"Forever in My Heart"	Peter DeLuise	Josef Anderson	March 20, 2016	1.80
Elizabeth attempts to trust Jack when she learns Faith is staying in Hope Valley for good, even as Jack sneaks around to negotiate a big purchase as he dreams of a future with her. Then, Elizabeth inspires her students with a science fair project, and Abigail learns Becky is finally coming home from the hospital. However, Becky's surprising debilitating condition concerns everyone, as Abigail contemplates the emotional decision of taking in Becky and Cody as her own. Meanwhile, a frustrated Bill Avery is determined to prove Henry Gowen is sabotaging Lee's business and causing it to fail. Then, just as Becky finds the courage to overcome the obstacle she fears most, Abigail assures her love is the best medicine after all before a visitor to the café threatens to tear the happy new family apart.
26	6	"Heartbreak"	Peter DeLuise	Richard Manning & Robin Bernheim Burger	March 27, 2016	1.94
Abigail is stunned at the arrival of Becky and Cody's Aunt Carolyn, who announces plans to move the children away from Hope Valley. Elizabeth fears a distraught Becky will have a setback in her recovery hampering a chance to demonstrate her talent at the science fair. Meanwhile, Jack and Bill find the needed proof to arrest Gowen in the sawmill case. The mayor insists on being framed and accuses Bill of having a personal vendetta against him for his romance with Nora. New clues lead Jack to another surprising suspect. At the settlement, Jack enlists Faith's help to convince Roy to return to Edith and let go of his fear of failure. Back home, Elizabeth shares her writing with Jack. He assures her she has something important to say about life on the frontier, and their relationship seems stronger than ever. As a producer gives Rosemary the opportunity to become a Hollywood star, she is forced to reconsider her life's dream and her love for Lee. Abigail, Cody and Becky prepare for a heartbreaking farewell, and Elizabeth makes an impassioned plea.
27	7	"Hearts in Question"	Neill Fearnley	Cynthia J. Cohen	April 3, 2016	2.07
Jack's mother Charlotte (Brooke Shields) arrives unannounced. As Elizabeth eagerly attempts to get to know her, she quickly finds she has little in common with her. Meanwhile, Abigail and Frank make their courtship official, causing her to wonder if she has found love again. Rosemary, busy planning her dream wedding to Lee, enlists the help of Abigail, Dottie and others in town to make it perfect, as well as extravagant. However, her preparations hit a snag, and she worries about her compatibility with Lee. At the settlement, Elizabeth urges the mothers to let her give their children lessons, but it takes Jack's confidence in her to finally convince them and impress Charlotte in the process. When Bill learns of a misuse of city funds, he begins a quiet investigation as a nervous Gowen convinces Nora to leave town with him in search of a new beginning; but bad weather looms near Hope Valley and its surrounding frontier. The settlement workers are at risk of a natural disaster that will threaten their land as well as their lives.
28	8	"Prayers from the Heart"	Neill Fearnley	Paul Jackson	April 10, 2016	2.53
Hope Valley comes to the aid of the Silverton miners trapped in the mudslide. As Jack leads a rescue team of Frank, Lee, Jesse and others out to the mine to find survivors, Elizabeth, Abigail and Faith convert the schoolhouse into a makeshift infirmary. Concerned for Jack, both Elizabeth and Charlotte come to understand each other through the crisis. Abigail must inform the settlement families about the disaster, a reminder of Hope Valley's own mining tragedy and the loss of her husband. Bill searches for a friend in trouble and discovers Nora and Gowen, who is left fighting for his life after their accident. Back in town, bride-to-be Rosemary makes a selfless gesture for the sake of the injured. Before the rescue mission is complete, Jack puts himself into even more danger to help a young girl near the swollen river. The strength of the town is again tested in this fight for survival, before coming together for the wedding.

=== Special (2016) ===
No. overall	Title	Directed by	Written by	Original showing	U.S. viewers (millions)
29	"Christmas"	Neill Fearnley	Robin Bernheim Burger	December 25, 2016	3.66
An intriguing peddler comes to Hope Valley selling the townspeople his wares and teaching them valuable lessons about joy and giving. When the townspeople realize that the recently displaced settlers in the area will not have a proper Christmas, they come together to create a special holiday celebration — including a Nativity presentation from the schoolchildren — that will infuse everyone with the true spirit of Christmas.

=== Season 4 (2017) ===
No. overall	No. in season	Title	Directed by	Written by	Original showing	U.S. viewers (millions)
30	1	"Words from the Heart"	Peter DeLuise	Charles Lazer	February 19, 2017	2.19
Abigail begins her duties as mayor, and nearly everyone in Hope Valley seems to want her attention. Ray Wyatt (Jeremy Guilbaut) of the National Pacific Railroad proposes a new route that he claims will bring business to the area. Abigail must determine the course of action best for the town, while not sacrificing the individual interests of its people. Bill is asked to head the railroad security team. Meanwhile, in an effort to integrate Elizabeth's new students from the settlement with the Hope Valley children, Jack proposes a friendly baseball game. He and Elizabeth divide them into teams and the two serve as respective coaches. The whole town turns out for the game, and one of the new children becomes a hero after Elizabeth encourages him to overcome his fear.
31	2	"Heart of Truth"	Peter DeLuise	Derek Thompson	February 26, 2017	1.86
Hope Valley's prosperity from the railroad begins when the mill gets a big contract and Lee Coulter expands his workforce to meet the demand. Rosemary worries about her new marriage, since Lee is working so many hours. Jack is honored by the Mounted Police for his outstanding work, while Elizabeth receives a rejection letter from the publisher about her book. The debate surrounding the railroad's plan to route through Hope Valley reaches a boiling point, and Abigail as mayor must break the town's tie vote on the matter. Bill accepts the railroad's offer as security head, after a fire on railroad property appears to be arson.
32	3	"The Heart of the Community"	Neill Fearnley	Richard Manning	March 5, 2017	2.13
Abigail finalizes a deal with Ray Wyatt to bring the railroad to Hope Valley, and new families flock to the town with the promise of work. When word reaches the town that a notorious gang is at large and may be heading their way, Jack and Bill enlist Frank's counsel in thwarting their plan to rob the incoming stage carrying the railroad's payroll. Elizabeth takes a strong interest in new student Philip Cantrell, whose single father Shane (Niall Matter) is working overtime at the mill and has little time left over for his son. She also plans a carnival to raise funds for supplies the school needs to accommodate the new students, and the entire town turns out in support. Rosemary's new job at the café comes to an abrupt end, but she quickly eyes a new opportunity.
33	4	"Change of Heart"	Neill Fearnley	Cynthia J. Cohen & Paul Jackson	March 12, 2017	2.21
Abigail's mayoral tenure is threatened as Gowen plots to be reinstated. Ray Wyatt promises Elizabeth that the railroad will help the underfunded school, but she ultimately finds her teaching position in jeopardy. Jack reunites with a younger Mountie that he mentored at the academy, while newcomer Carson Shepherd lands a job at the café after being sidelined from railroad labor with an injury. Abigail and Frank's relationship is still in limbo, but Rosemary schemes with Cody to get them back together. Not swayed by their failed stagecoach heist, the Tate brothers return to Hope Valley intent on carrying out a daring bank robbery.
34	5	"Heart of a Teacher"	Michael Landon Jr.	Derek Thompson	March 19, 2017	2.01
When the key witness against him fails to appear, Gowen reassumes his position as mayor and, without warning, summarily fires Elizabeth as the school's teacher, citing a hidden scandal from her past. With nearly the entire town's support, especially the children, and Abigail at her side, she travels to Cape Fullerton in hopes of resolving the false allegations. Bill lays out a plan to learn what underhandedness is going on between Gowen and Ray Wyatt. Following days of instruction under Mr. Stoneman, the school's strict new teacher, Cody takes a stand in defense of Emily and leads the students in a walkout. When Jack delivers the Tate brothers to Mountie Headquarters, he receives bad news about the young Mountie he mentored.
35	6	"My Heart Will Go On"	Peter DeLuise	Charles Lazer	March 26, 2017	2.02
Elizabeth tutors Hope Valley's children after school, while continuing to fight for her rightful job as their teacher. Abigail and Cody spearhead a letter-writing campaign for Elizabeth's reinstatement, while an unexpected ally steps in on Elizabeth's behalf. Gowen continues to act as the puppet of Ray Wyatt, who remains intent on controlling the town and its inhabitants. Meanwhile, Bill redoubles his efforts to locate the missing witness, an accountant whose testimony could help finally bring Gowen to justice. Jack attends the funeral of the young Mountie and begins to question his own devotion to duty.
36	7	"Healing Heart"	Michael Rohl	Richard Manning	April 2, 2017	2.08
Elizabeth is overjoyed by her engagement to Jack and begins to plan their future together in Hope Valley, as she nervously awaits word that her betrothed is safe amidst the danger of the Northern Territories. When Lee loses his voice, Rosemary helps him run the mill, with some unforeseen results. At the café, Carson Shepherd, Abigail's new cook with a mysterious past, implements a plan to attract customers in the wake of Wyatt's obvious attempts to squeeze her out of business. Elizabeth has a challenge with a pair of newly enrolled students, railroad kids who are ill-behaved bullies harboring a family secret. She's determined to discover the source of their anger so she can help them but gets no help from their uncle, Ray Wyatt. Acting on an informant's tip, Bill finally captures the mystery witness, but both Avery and the witness, A.J. Foster (Josie Bissett), engage in a firefight when Wyatt learns that Avery might be onto his and Gowen's plans.
37	8	"Courageous Hearts"	Michael Rohl	Cynthia J. Cohen & Paul Jackson	April 9, 2017	2.31
Elizabeth further attracts Wyatt's ire when she asks his brother Russ to help his sons deal with the loss of their mother. Bill's plan to bring A.J. Foster back to testify against Gowen is complicated by Dale Kellogg, who was ordered by Wyatt to stop them by any means necessary. Frank Hogan's suspicions about Carson's past prompt the newcomer to share his big secret. Meanwhile, Abigail receives an offer from Wyatt that could save the café. After Lee buys a new car, Rosemary insists that he teach her to drive but instead learns a lesson about humility.
38	9	"Heart of a Secret"	Neill Fearnley	Robin Bernheim Burger	April 16, 2017	2.16
Abigail is reinstated as mayor with Gowen in jail. A mystery woman arrives bearing harmful allegations about Carson's secret past that confirm Frank's suspicions. Elizabeth tends to Opal for a few days, learns about motherhood, and is thrilled when a young Mountie under Jack's command gives her an update on him. Cody is excited that his sister Becky has returned from school on a surprise visit but is saddened that she doesn't seem to have any time for him. Meanwhile, Rosemary questions her own talents when she is unable to make sales at Dottie's Dress Shop.
39	10	"Heart of a Fighter"	Neill Fearnley	Cynthia J. Cohen & Paul Jackson	April 23, 2017	2.58
Cody lies seriously ill at the infirmary with apparent appendicitis, and a race is on to get a qualified surgeon to Hope Valley in time. When Dr. Strohm arrives the next day and declares that Cody does not have appendicitis, Abigail is relieved. However, Carson vehemently disagrees with the diagnosis and insists Cody needs lifesaving emergency surgery. Abigail must decide whether to allow Carson to operate against Dr. Strohm's orders, while Elizabeth tries to convince his sister-in-law that his Carson was not responsible for his wife's death. Everyone in town is concerned for Cody, including Becky, who promises to spend more time with him when he gets better, and Gowen. During this crisis, Abigail finally receives news about her status as Cody and Becky's guardian.

=== Special (2017) ===
No. overall	Title	Directed by	Written by	Original showing	U.S. viewers (millions)
40	"The Christmas Wishing Tree"	Neill Fearnley	Cynthia J. Cohen & Paul Jackson	December 25, 2017	3.61
Hope Valley is buzzing from the introduction of the Wishing Tree, with all the townspeople eagerly placing their wishes on its branches in the hopes they will be granted. Elizabeth wishes for Jack's return. Meanwhile, Abigail spearheads the town's first Christmas parade, featuring an energetic band, led by Bill. Abigail's newly adopted son, Cody, tries to make their first Christmas together special, connecting her past with their future. Rosemary and Lee discover the importance of Christmas traditions and treasured memories. Meanwhile, Doctor Carson Shepherd exhibits faith and resilience in trying to heal and inspire a guarded woman who has given up on the spirit of Christmas. Also, disgraced former mayor, Henry Gowen, gets a second chance at redemption.

=== Season 5 (2018) ===
No. overall	No. in season	Title	Directed by	Written by	Original showing	U.S. viewers (millions)
41	1	"Believing"	Martin Wood	Derek Thompson	February 18, 2018	2.20
Elizabeth's sister, Julie, visits Hope Valley in her quest to become a teacher; Lee is made acting sheriff when Abigail and Bill leave town to testify in Gowen's trial; Carson has problems with a traveling tonic salesmen.
42	2	"Hearts and Minds"	Martin Wood	Paco Cleveland	February 25, 2018	2.23
Elizabeth mentors Julie, who finds teaching more difficult than she imagined; Abigail has to find a way to convince the railroad to build its depot in Hope Valley.
43	3	"Home Is Where the Heart Is"	Mike Rohl	Elizabeth Stewart	March 4, 2018	2.18
Jack returns and he and Elizabeth start planning their future; sparks fly between Carson and a new arrival; and Elizabeth teaches her students the difference between facts and speculation.
44	4	"Open Hearts"	Mike Rohl	Cynthia J. Cohen & Paul Jackson	March 11, 2018	2.11
Abigail has to figure out how to keep the town's bank thriving. Meanwhile, Elizabeth struggles to understand what troubles one of her students. Rosemary is overzealous in planning Jack and Elizabeth's wedding.
45	5	"My Heart Is Yours"	Neill Fearnley	Paco Cleveland	March 18, 2018	2.45
Jack and Elizabeth's plan to get married is put in serious jeopardy, and Bill has difficulties transporting a prisoner.
46	6	"Love and Marriage"	Neill Fearnley	Cynthia J. Cohen & Paul Jackson	March 25, 2018	2.15
Jack and Elizabeth's relationship is put to the test. Pastor Frank and Abigail make a decision about their future and Bill helps a young girl solve a mystery.
47	7	"Heart of the Matter"	Peter DeLuise	Elizabeth Stewart	April 1, 2018	1.93
Elizabeth assigns her students to follow business leaders in Hope Valley; Abigail and the town host two possible investors for the failing bank; and Bill's life is disrupted when A.J. Foster arrives and turns herself in.
48	8	"Weather the Storm"	Peter DeLuise	Derek Thompson	April 8, 2018	2.12
Bill is put in jeopardy while transporting A.J. to face trial; Abigail tries to save the town from an investor who will hurt Hope Valley; Carson is faced with a decision concerning his late wife's other sister; Elizabeth tries to reunite a mother and her son.
49	9	"In My Dreams"	Neill Fearnley	Elizabeth Stewart	April 15, 2018	2.04
The widow of Lee's former partner arrives and gives Gowen a chance to run a company again; Elizabeth tutors a new student; the residents of Hope Valley conspire to pull off a surprise. However, Elizabeth receives shocking news about Jack.
50	10	"Close to My Heart"	Neill Fearnley	Derek Thompson	April 22, 2018	2.57
Three weeks following Jack's death, Elizabeth, distraught, wonders if she should remain in town. Abigail gives her a letter that Jack wrote to be read in the event of his death. Bill gives her Jack's horse from the Mounties, and the school is renamed in Jack's honor. Elizabeth exhibits strange symptoms, and Abigail suggests that she is pregnant.

=== Special (2018) ===
No. overall	Title	Directed by	Written by	Original showing	U.S. viewers (millions)
51	"The Greatest Christmas Wish (Blessing)"	Neill Fearnley	Alfonso H. Moreno	December 25, 2018	3.74
As Christmas approaches in Hope Valley, newly widowed Elizabeth prepares for the birth of her baby, while Abigail prepares for the town's Christmas gathering. The town welcomes orphans and their caretakers, who have been stranded on their journey to a new orphanage. Abigail, Rosemary, and Lee take the visitors into their homes, and Dr. Shepherd pays special attention to an orphan that is apparently unable to speak. However, when Bill makes a troubling discovery about these newcomers, he is forced to make a difficult decision that will affect all their lives. Meanwhile, Elizabeth, Abigail, and Rosemary get stuck in a storm and face a Christmas Eve emergency.: The episode serves as a backdoor pilot to the series' spin-off, When Hope Calls, which premiered in August 2019 on Hallmark Movies Now, the Hallmark Channel's digital streaming service. Season 2 of When Hope Calls aired on Great American Family.

=== Season 6 (2019) ===
No. overall	No. in season	Title	Directed by	Written by	Original showing	U.S. viewers (millions)
52	1	"Phone Rings and Heartstrings"	Neill Fearnley	Alfonso H. Moreno	February 24, 2019	2.45
After taking time off to care for her new baby, Elizabeth returns to teaching but soon realizes she needs more support than she could have imagined. Abigail prepares for the arrival of the telephone to Hope Valley. Bill and Gowen enter a bidding war for the town saloon. Rosemary tries to generate a romance between Faith and Carson.
53	2	"The Queen of Hearts"	Neill Fearnley	Elizabeth Stewart	March 3, 2019	2.39
Bill and Abigail are skeptical of Lucas, a newcomer to Hope Valley. Bill investigates him, with some help from a spy at the town's new switchboard. At the schoolhouse, Elizabeth teaches one of her students to find his confidence. Intrigued by the stock market, Abigail solicits Gowen's investment help. Meanwhile, Clara applies for a job at the saloon.
54	3	"A Vote of Confidence"	Martin Wood	Derek Thompson	March 10, 2019	2.14
Bill turns to an old friend for help tracking down gunrunners responsible for the deaths of Mounties. Elizabeth uses her gentle guidance to help one of her students stand up for himself, while Abigail – always one to stand up for herself and the town – uses her power of persuasion when confronted with Lucas, an uncooperative business owner. Along with Abigail, Rosemary and Lee step up to help Elizabeth care for her baby. Meanwhile, Carson and Faith reevaluate their relationship.
55	4	"Heart of a Mountie"	Martin Wood	Annie Brunner	May 5, 2019^{a}	2.27
After Abigail leaves with Cody to tend to her sick mother, Elizabeth is confronted by memories as a new Mountie, Nathan Grant, comes to Hope Valley. Bill reluctantly teams up with Nathan to investigate a robbery, and both men suspect that there is more to the crime than meets the eye. Rosemary buys a telephone, and Lee worries this new technology will contribute to her tendency to gossip. Meanwhile, Jesse's jealousy of Clara's boss reaches a boiling point.
56	5	"Surprise"	Mike Rohl	Alfonso H. Moreno & Annie Brunner	May 6, 2019	1.65
A small earthquake hits Hope Valley. Elizabeth helps Nathan's niece connect with her new classmates. Bill contemplates an interesting job offer. Gowen makes a compelling offer of his own to Jesse and Clara. Meanwhile, Carson and Faith grow closer together.
57	6	"Disputing Hearts"	Mike Rohl	Elizabeth Stewart & Derek Thompson	May 12, 2019	2.00
When Hope Valley strikes oil, the newfound riches complicate matters in town. Also, Elizabeth helps Nathan's niece open up to her classmates, and learns more about Nathan in the process. Bill considers a new job. Carson helps Faith connect with her estranged father. Meanwhile, Fiona trains Florence at the town switchboard, and quickly realizes she has her work cut out for her.
58	7	"Hope is With the Heart" "Heart on My Sleeve"^{b}	Peter DeLuise	Elizabeth Stewart & Derek Thompson (part 1)	May 19, 2019	1.99
58	7	"Hope is With the Heart" "Heart on My Sleeve"^{b}	Peter DeLuise	Alfonso H. Moreno & Annie Brunner (part 2)	May 19, 2019	1.99
Elizabeth receives some unexpected help from Lucas in her mission to create a town library and Rosemary shares a struggle on her heart with Lee. Bill also serves as judge in Hope Valley when Jesse sues Gowen. Bill and Nathan apprehend an infamous outlaw, "Gentleman Johnny" (Bruce Boxleitner) while Fiona and Rosemary explore different fashion ideas.
59	8	"A Call from the Past"	Martin Wood	Elizabeth Stewart & Derek Thompson	May 26, 2019	2.33
Strangers come to Hope Valley, and Elizabeth finds herself in the wrong place at the wrong time. She must escape the precarious situation brought on by Lucas's mysterious past. Lee's business suffers when Gowen hires his top employees away. Meanwhile, Rosemary hosts some out of town visitors and finds that their help disturbs her otherwise peaceful domestic bliss.
60	9^{b}	"Two of Hearts"	Martin Wood	Alfonso H. Moreno & Annie Brunner	June 2, 2019	2.40
Elizabeth looks to both baby Jack's future and her own. With the excitement of the approaching Hope Valley Founder's Day Festival, she plans his christening, with Julie, Bill, Rosemary, and Lee attending. Jesse plans a surprise for Clara meanwhile Bill finds some startling information about Gowen.

a.Season six was put on hold and "retooled" after Lori Loughlin's arrest, in relation to the 2019 college admissions bribery scandal, and her removal from all Crown Media Holdings projects.
b.Season six was originally planned to be 10 episodes; however, due to the combining of "Hope is With the Heart" with "Heart on My Sleeve", it was decreased to nine episodes.

=== Special (2019) ===
No. overall	Title	Directed by	Written by	Original showing	U.S. viewers (millions)
61	"Home for Christmas"	Mike Rohl	Alfonso H. Moreno (part 1)	December 25, 2019	3.02
61	"Home for Christmas"	Mike Rohl	Elizabeth Stewart (part 2)	December 25, 2019	3.02
Elizabeth prepares for Little Jack's first Christmas and birthday, while missing Jack more than ever. Nathan receives a prestigious job offer in Union City but weighs the promotion against the downside of leaving Elizabeth and taking his niece away from Hope Valley. Lucas holds a Christmas festival to bring some of his family's traditions to Hope Valley (and to impress Elizabeth). Carson and Faith face obstacles when they try to reconnect for Christmas, which leads him to a stranger in need of his help. Meanwhile, Rosemary and Lee search for the perfect gift for Little Jack, while Bill searches for a special gift that he misplaced.

=== Season 7 (2020) ===
No. overall	No. in season	Title	Directed by	Written by	Original showing	U.S. viewers (millions)
62	1	"A Moving Picture"	Martin Wood	Alfonso H. Moreno	February 23, 2020	2.14
Renewing her love of writing, Elizabeth shares her manuscript with Lucas but isn't prepared for his honest critique of her work. She and Nathan also navigate their relationship, which borders between friendship and romance. A journalist comes to town to profile Gowen, who fears what Bill and others may have to share about him. Rosemary and Lee prepare for an anniversary getaway, but their plans are thwarted by a work conflict. Faith receives a job offer away from Hope Valley, which could jeopardize her relationship with Carson. Meanwhile, Jesse and Clara plan for their upcoming wedding.
63	2	"The Heart of a Father"	Martin Wood	Elizabeth Stewart	March 1, 2020	2.10
Elizabeth helps Nathan ease family tensions when his father arrives. Rosemary advises Clara and Jesse on wedding plans. Bill and Lucas lose customers when a rumor spreads.
64	3	"Family Matters"	Neill Fearnley	Derek Thompson	March 8, 2020	1.96
After arresting his father, Nathan is moved by his niece to give him another chance, and he investigates his alleged crime. Lucas enjoys the first chapters of Elizabeth's novel. Clara and Jesse make progress with the wedding plans. Faith is in denial about her future as a nurse.
65	4	"Sweet and Sour"	Neill Fearnley	Annie Brunner	March 15, 2020	2.16
Elizabeth, Carson and Faith deal with an outbreak of chickenpox, resulting in Rosemary falling ill. When Gowen is sued, Bill must pull together Hope Valley's first jury. Faith leaves to go to medical school in Chicago.
66	5	"An Unexpected Gift"	Neill Fearnley	Derek Thompson	March 22, 2020	2.35
Elizabeth gets a surprise bouquet of flowers, which has the town wondering who left them, and Rosemary and Lee organize Jesse & Clara's bachelor and bachelorette parties.
67	6	"In Perfect Unity"	Neill Fearnley	Annie Brunner	March 29, 2020	2.36
The town, led by Elizabeth, work together to give Clara and Jesse their dream wedding; Elizabeth is struggling with her two suitors.
68	7	"Heart of a Writer"	Peter DeLuise	Elizabeth Stewart & Derek Thompson	April 5, 2020	2.31
Elizabeth goes on a trip with Lucas and must face her growing feelings for him. Jesse and Clara adjust to sharing a home. Lee and Rosemary are challenged with watching Little Jack.
69	8	"Into the Woods"	Peter DeLuise	Alfonso H. Moreno & Annie Brunner	April 12, 2020	2.28
A dangerous windstorm puts Hope Valley at risk. Elizabeth takes half the class on a field trip, while Carson is the substitute teacher for the rest. Jesse causes concern.
70	9	"New Possibilities"	Neill Fearnley	Derek Thompson & Elizabeth Stewart	April 19, 2020	2.45
Elizabeth and Nathan try to resolve their differences. Rosemary learns a secret about Lee. Elizabeth feels betrayed by Lucas, but helps him get the oil company's records from Gowen. Nathan goes undercover. Fiona gets bad news.
71	10	"Don't Go"	Neill Fearnley	Alfonso H. Moreno	April 26, 2020	2.67
Elizabeth hears news about her book. Lee gets a surprise that stirs up wounds from his past. Fiona tries to find a way to stay in Hope Valley. Lucas makes a last-ditch effort to preserve his partnership in Gowen Petroleum. Nathan finds himself in a dangerous situation when transporting a prisoner.

=== Season 8 (2021) ===
No. overall	No. in season	Title	Directed by	Written by	Original showing	U.S. viewers (millions)
72	1	"Open Season"	Mike Rohl	John Tinker	February 21, 2021	2.14
Elizabeth has finished her manuscript and tries to come to terms with how she feels about Nathan and Lucas. An unwelcome visitor stirs up trouble for Nathan and Allie. A homesick Rosemary and Lee cut their South American trip short. Faith returns from medical school. Clara and Jesse haven't been getting along. Fiona starts a new business venture.
73	2	"Honestly, Elizabeth"	Mike Rohl	John Tinker	February 28, 2021	2.18
The sudden arrival of Lucas' mother Helen Bouchard makes Elizabeth more than a little nervous when she begins to edit Elizabeth's manuscript. Lee injures his back. A newcomer's arrival causes Rosemary to reflect on what she wants in life.
74	3	"From the Ashes"	Peter DeLuise	Derek Thompson	March 7, 2021	2.18
A geyser erupts at the oil rig and everyone in Hope Valley drops everything to help. Nathan is summoned for an inquiry by a Mountie from his past and Jesse takes a liking to driving Lee's motorcycle.
75	4	"Welcome to Hope Valley"	Peter DeLuise	Elizabeth Stewart	March 14, 2021	2.40
The inquiry begins, and Nathan starts to question his own actions. Meanwhile, a new family, the Canfields, buy Gowen's cabin and Elizabeth welcomes them to Hope Valley. Lee's sister and niece arrive in Hope Valley.
76	5	"What the Heart Wants"	Mike Rohl	Elizabeth Stewart	March 21, 2021	2.21
It's graduation day at the Jack Thornton School house as well time for parent-teacher conferences. Rosemary and Lee adjust to having family in town. A letter from Dottie sends all the Coulters reeling. Clara learns Jesse made a big mistake.
77	6	"No Regrets"	Mike Rohl	Derek Thompson	March 28, 2021	2.33
Elizabeth wonders if she is truly ready to let love in again. Rosemary wonders what her purpose is. Clara and Jesse sort through their marital issues. Carson receives an amazing opportunity. A stranger named Christopher comes to town.
78	7	"Before My Very Eyes"	Peter DeLuise	Derek Thompson	April 4, 2021	2.27
A health scare has everyone in Hope Valley worried about one of their own. Nathan is finally going to get Allie's adoption finalized. Lucas starts to become suspicious of Christopher's behavior since arriving in Hope Valley, while Christopher decides maybe he'd like to stay.
79	8	"A Parade and a Charade"	Peter DeLuise	John Tinker	April 11, 2021	2.56
Elizabeth focuses on teaching Angela how to read braille. Rosemary and Lee struggle to give Rachel the freedom she was promised in Hope Valley. Bill feels displaced when he's asked to finally return his Mountie uniform.
80	9	"Pre-Wedding Jitters"	Siobhan Devine	John Tinker	April 18, 2021	2.59
Elizabeth is distraught over the reveal of Nathan's secret. Everyone helps a couple prepare for their wedding. The bachelor and bachelorette parties stir up mixed emotions from the guests. A mysterious businessman arrives in town.
81	10	"Old Love, New Love, Is This True Love"	Siobhan Devine	Elizabeth Stewart	April 25, 2021	2.65
Florence and Ned's wedding in Hope Valley leads every couple to evaluate their relationships. Rosemary discovers there is more happening in Hope Valley than everyone realizes, and she decides to get to the bottom of it.
82	11	"Changing Times"	Peter DeLuise	John Tinker	May 2, 2021	2.63
Landis, the school inspector, arrives in town and causes trouble for Elizabeth. Rosemary finds her calling. A search is called when one of Hope Valley's residents is lost. Carson and Faith's relationship is put to the ultimate test.
83	12	"The Kiss"	Peter DeLuise	John Tinker	May 9, 2021	2.79
Elizabeth has finally realized who she's supposed to be with. Big changes are coming to Hope Valley. The town rallies together to say goodbye and good luck to one of its own.

=== Season 9 (2022) ===
No. overall	No. in season	Title	Directed by	Written by	Original showing	U.S. viewers (millions)
84	1	"In Like a Lion"	Peter DeLuise	John Tinker	March 6, 2022	2.27
An interesting stranger comes to town. Lucas talks to a new partner, leading him to make a decision about the future of the oil company. A new business opens up in town. An automobile accident leads to a town member getting hurt.
85	2	"Out Like a Lamb"	Peter DeLuise	John Tinker	March 13, 2022	2.34
The results of the mayor election surprises everyone. Mei Sou asks Bill for help. Elizabeth helps Nathan with Newton(his horse). Rosemary asks Lee to join The Valley Voice.
86	3	"Turn of the Page"	Siobhan Devine	Derek Thompson	March 20, 2022	2.15
Elizabeth's book is finally published, causing a commotion amongst the townspeople. Joseph works on his relationship with Cooper. Problems arise between Rosemary and Lee when he writes his first story for the paper. Nathan has a hard time dealing with the after math of the accident.
87	4	"Straight from the Heart"	Siobhan Devine	Elizabeth Stewart	March 27, 2022	2.09
When Lucas takes care of Jack, Elizabeth can't help but be impressed. Mr. Landis gives Elizabth bad news. Mei confides her past to Bill. The man behind Nathan's accident is finally caught.
88	5	"Journey into the Light"	Neill Fearnley	Peter DeLuise	April 3, 2022	2.24
Allie comes back to Hope Valley. Rosemary feels a strain in her and Lee's relationship. Nathan becomes weary of Lucas and Walden's partnership. The Canfields invite Mr. Landis over for dinner hoping to change his mind.
89	6	"Past, Present, Future"	Neill Fearnley	John Tinker	April 10, 2022	2.31
As Hope Valley continues to grow, problems arise with more automobiles around. Fiona comes back from California excited to have closed the deal for the oil company, but it may come at a big cost. Lee runs a story on his concerns about the new Mayor.
90	7	"Hope Valley Days, Part 1"	Peter DeLuise	John Tinker	April 17, 2022	2.19
Mayor Hickam hosts Hope Valley Days to bring the community together. Mei's past catches up to her. Minnie and Joseph try to get a loan to buy Abigail's half of the cafe.
91	8	"Hope Valley Days, Part 2"	Peter DeLuise	John Tinker	April 24, 2022	2.55
As Hope Valley Days continue, Mei finally tells Nathan about her past with Geoffrey. Bill's health takes a toll.
92	9	"Recent Memory"	Neill Fearnley	Allie Devereaux	May 1, 2022	2.16
Mike thinks about resigning as mayor. When Walden pays Lucas a visit, Bill and him set a plan into motion to stop him. Mei heads back to Chicago.
93	10	"Never Say Never"	Neill Fearnley	Derek Thompson	May 8, 2022	2.28
Rosemary falls ill. The man who ran Nathan over tries to make a plea deal that just might save Lucas. Rosemary writes a story that could put Lucas in a bad light.
94	11	"Smoke on the Water"	Peter DeLuise	Derek Thompson	May 15, 2022	2.37
Elizabeth notices a change in Lucas. Jerome plays dirty to get the mines back up and running, sending the town folk into a frenzy. Meanwhile, Henry takes drastic measures to stop him.
95	12	"Rock, a Bye, Baby"	Peter DeLuise	John Tinker	May 22, 2022	2.51
Rosemary finds out about the offer Lee received from Arthur. Lucas leaves Hope Valley to spend sometime alone. Rosemary is hesitant to ask Faith for help. A fire breaks out on the saloon. Elizabeth gets a nice surprise.

=== Season 10 (2023) ===
No. overall	No. in season	Title	Directed by	Written by	Original showing	U.S. viewers (millions)
96	1	"Carpe Diem"	Neill Fearnley	Lindsay Sturman	July 30, 2023	1.93
Elizabeth and Lucas continue wedding plans and pick their best man and maid of honor. During tough economic times, Leland stretches his finances in an effort to employ as many men as possible. Nathan is assigned a failed Mounty dog and Allie bonds with it.
97	2	"Hope Springs Eternal"	Neill Fearnley	Derek Thompson	August 6, 2023	1.72
Elizabeth's sister and aunt come to town. Mei encourages Nathan to mend fences with Faith. At Henry's long awaited hearing, Bill is surprised when he pleads guilty. Children in town discover a hot springs and it gains the attention of the whole town as a possible tourist attraction which they name Hope Springs.
98	3	"Oh, Baby"	Peter DeLuise	Paul Redford	August 13, 2023	1.69
Tourists begin to come to Hope Valley. A surprise baby shower is held for Rosemary. After Faith is attacked by a bandit, Nathan accompanies her on her rounds. Lucas negotiates a pardon for Henry.
99	4	"Great Expectations"	Peter DeLuise	Elizabeth Stewart	August 20, 2023	1.88
Rosemary goes into labor and gives birth to a girl. The bandit that attacked Faith is caught and in the spirit of giving second chances, he is hired by the Yosts to work in their store.
100	5	"Life is But a Dream"	Neill Fearnley	Ayla Glass	August 27, 2023	1.95
Elizabeth and Lucas enjoy a date night, while Rosemary and Lee babysit their newborn. Nathan and Allie go camping with Joseph, and Madeline tries to buy land from Bill.
101	6	"The Heart of the Problem"	Neill Fearnley	Allie Devereaux	September 3, 2023	1.81
Mrs. St John (Madeline) asks Bill to help her find a property to buy, but insists on one that includes a stream that she can't find. They begin meeting daily for breakfast and when he learns she plans to leave town because she can't find the right property, he offers to sell her the property he has owned with the plan of building on it himself someday.
102	7	"Best Laid Plans"	Alysse Leite-Rogers	Elizabeth Stewart	September 10, 2023	1.76
While Madeline is out of town, Bill tries to get the cabin ready for her on the land he sold her - only to discover that Madeline is engaged. Meanwhile Lucas intends to surprise the town with the purchase of the town's first radio, but technical problems slow down the reveal. When Henry finds out that Rosaleen Sullivan is back in town ( a daughter of one of the miners that was killed when he ran the mine) and struggling to afford college, he anonymously starts a scholarship fund in hopes of making amends without talking to her.
103	8	"What Is and What Never Should Be"	Alysse Leite-Rogers	Derek Thompson	September 17, 2023	1.84
Allie offers to babysit little Jack, and panics when she can't find him during hide and seek. Nathan comes to her aid but they find him hiding in the living room and Elizabeth has no hard feelings. Rosaleen realizes that the scholarship is from Henry and so rejects it and plans to leave town to avoid him and the memories of the mining disaster. Her mother convinces her to forgive and she meets with him to tell him that she does. Elizabeth has growing suspicions that the workers on the land Bill sold to Madeline are more than just drilling a new well and vows to find out.
104	9	"Deep Water"	Siobhan Devine	Lindsay Sturman	September 24, 2023	1.97
The governor is coming to Hope Valley and Rosemary reveals that she made a number of elaborate promises to get him there - and they have just 24 hours to make them come true. As the town scrambles to be ready, they learn he will be there in 3 hours. Meanwhile Bill and Nathan respond to a hostage situation with Pinkerton guards. They get there and side against the Pinkertons and get away. A tourist discovers that Hope Springs has run dry. They discover that Montague who is doing the building on Bills former property is working to divert water from the river away from Hope Valley.
105	10	"All Dressed Up"	Siobhan Devine	Paul Redford	October 1, 2023	1.96
The meeting with the governor reveals that Montague's plan includes several other cities and that the governor is his partner in company that is doing the construction. Lucas appears to give in to their wishes to learn more, and then uses the radio transmission to reveal publicly the governor and company's corruption.
106	11	"Long Time Running"	Peter DeLuise	Derek Thompson	October 8, 2023	1.98
When the governor's opponent drops out, his political party convinces Lucas to run. Elizabeth struggles with the idea that if Lucas wins it will mean him moving away from Hope Valley. As he gets ready to leave for the convention, she tells him she can't go with him and they are not meant to be together.
107	12	"Starry Nights"	Peter DeLuise	Lindsay Sturman	October 15, 2023	2.29
Election day comes. Goldie gets baptized. Afterward the town learns that Lucas won the election by a narrow margin.

=== Season 11 (2024) ===
No. overall	No. in season	Title	Directed by	Written by	Original showing	U.S. viewers (millions)
108	1	"When Stars Align"	Neill Fearnley	Lindsay Sturman	April 7, 2024	1.77
109	2	"Tomorrow Never Knows"	Neill Fearnley	Derek Thompson	April 14, 2024	1.72
110	3	"Steps Forward"	Mike Rohl	Allie Devereaux	April 21, 2024	1.85
111	4	"Along Came a Spider"	Mike Rohl	Elizabeth Stewart	April 28, 2024	1.77
112	5	"Stronger Together"	Alysse Leite-Rogers	Paul Redford	May 5, 2024	1.91
113	6	"Believe"	Alysse Leite-Rogers	Dana Brawer & Lindsay Sturman	May 12, 2024	1.98
114	7	"Facing the Music"	Stacey N. Harding	Paul Redford	May 19, 2024	1.78
115	8	"Brother's Keeper"	Stacey N. Harding	Tunette Powell & Lindsay Sturman	May 26, 2024	1.77
116	9	"Truth Be Told"	Siobhan Devine	Allie Devereaux	June 2, 2024	1.94
117	10	"What Goes Around"	Siobhan Devine	Elizabeth Stewart	June 9, 2024	2.16
118	11	"Run to You"	Peter DeLuise	Derek Thompson	June 16, 2024	2.14
119	12	"Anything for Love"	Peter DeLuise	Elizabeth Stewart	June 23, 2024	2.18

=== Season 12 (2025) ===
No. overall	No. in season	Title	Directed by	Written by	Original showing	U.S. viewers (millions)
120	1	"The Mountie Way"	Mike Rohl	Elizabeth Stewart	January 5, 2025	1.52
121	2	"You Get What You Give"	Mike Rohl	Derek Thompson	January 12, 2025	1.61
122	3	"All That Glitters"	Alysse Leite-Rogers	Paul Redford	January 19, 2025	1.45
123	4	"Dancing Teens"	Alysse Leite-Rogers	Allie Devereaux	January 26, 2025	1.52
124	5	"Mom's the Word"	Martin Wood	Elizabeth Stewart	February 2, 2025	1.60
125	6	"When Autumn Leaves Begin to Fall"	Martin Wood	Joy Gregory	February 8, 2025	1.31
126	7	"Dance the Night Away"	Kristin Lehman	Derek Thompson	February 16, 2025	1.45
127	8	"The Show Must Go On"	Kristin Lehman	Allie Devereaux	February 23, 2025	1.51
128	9	"Buried Treasure"	Siobhan Devine	Paul Redford & Liam Fearnley	March 2, 2025	1.39
129	10	"Through the Valley"	Siobhan Devine	Joy Gregory & Lindsay Sturman	March 9, 2025	1.54
130	11	"Having Faith"	Peter DeLuise	Joy Gregory & Lindsay Sturman	March 16, 2025	1.55
131	12	"Must Be Gold"	Peter DeLuise	Lindsay Sturman	March 23, 2025	1.53

=== Season 13 (2026) ===
No. overall	No. in season	Title	Directed by	Written by	Original showing	Viewers (millions)
132	1	"Up in the Air"	Mike Rohl	Joy Gregory	January 4, 2026	
133	2	"Up in Smoke"	Mike Rohl	David Grae	January 11, 2026	
134	3	"Back to School"	Alysse Leite-Rogers	Gina Gold & Aurorae Khoo	January 18, 2026	
135	4	"Until Proven Guilty"	Alysse Leite-Rogers	Allie Devereaux	January 25, 2026	
136	5	"Growing Pains"	Peter DeLuise	Joy Gregory & Max Rosenblum	February 1, 2026	1.36
137	6	"Moment of Truth"	Peter DeLuise	David Grae & Liam Fearnley	February 7, 2026	
138	7	"In a Jam"	Kristin Lehman	Gina Gold & Aurorae Khoo	February 15, 2026	1.73
139	8	"Take Two"	Kristin Lehman	Liam Fearnley	February 22, 2026	
140	9	"Lost and Found Again"	Martin Wood	Allie Devereaux	March 1, 2026	1.64
141	10	"Blessings"	Martin Wood	David Grae	March 8, 2026	1.64
142	11	"Trials and Trails and Tribulations"	Kristin Lehman	Joy Gregory	March 15, 2026	1.55
143	12	"Harvest Moon"	Kristin Lehman	Joy Gregory & David Grae	March 22, 2026	1.71
