= 1996 Malta Open darts =

Malta Open

Tournament information
- Dates: 24 November 1996
- Country: Malta
- Organisation(s): BDO, WDF, MDA
- Winner's share: Lm 500

Champion(s)
- (England) Ted Hankey

1996 Malta Open was a darts tournament part of the annual, Malta Open, which took place in Malta in 1996. Ted Hankley won for the second time in a row following his win in the 1995 tournament.

== Results ==
Round	Player
Winner	(England) Ted Hankey
Final	(Malta) Gordon Stanmore
Semi-finals	(England) Andy Foden
Semi-finals	(Malta) Anthony Caruana
Quarter-finals	(England) Brian Bird
Quarter-finals	(England) Dave Jowett
Quarter-finals	(Malta) Vincent Busuttil
Quarter-finals	(Malta) Tony Demanuele
