= Home to Harmony =

2026 American television series

- Genre: Drama
- Based on: Harmony series by Philip Gulley
- Developed by: Michael Landon Jr. Brian Bird; Ken LaZebnik
- Starring: Mike Vogel; Ferelith Young; Anna Mirodin; Hudson Wurster; Wendy Lyon
- Country of origin: United States
- Original language: English
- No. of seasons: 1
- No. of episodes: TBA

Production
- Executive producers: Michael Landon Jr. Brian Bird; Ken LaZebnik; Mike Vogel; Philip Gulley
- Production companies: CN Ring Productions; Hideaway Pictures

Original release
- Network: Angel Studios
- Release: November 18, 2026 – present

Home to Harmony is an American drama television series based on the Harmony novels by Philip Gulley. It was created by Michael Landon Jr., Brian Bird, and Ken LaZebnik, and stars Mike Vogel. The series premiered on the Angel streaming platform on November 18, 2026.

== Premise ==
After the death of his wife, Sam Gardner leaves his parish in Brooklyn and returns to his hometown of Harmony, Indiana, with his two children to lead the church he attended as a boy. As he settles back into the community, he reconnects with its residents, rediscovers a sense of purpose, and rekindles a relationship with his childhood crush. The series explores themes of grief, faith, personal renewal, and small-town life.

== Cast ==
- Mike Vogel as Sam Gardner
- Ferelith Young as Deena Nicholson
- Anna Mirodin as Lilly Gardner
- Hudson Wurster as Eli Gardner
- Wendy Lyon as Gloria Gardner
- Ted Atherton as Charlie Gardner
- Eric Peterson as Pastor Taylor
- Kate Fuglei as Fern Hampton
- Stuart Hughes as Dale Hinshaw
- Dylan Roberts as Harvey Muldock
- Kathleen Laskey as Evy Maloof

== Production ==
The series was developed by Michael Landon Jr., Brian Bird, and Ken LaZebnik, the creative team behind When Calls the Heart. Landon Jr. also directed the pilot. Angel Studios announced the project in October 2024 after it received approval from the Angel Guild. Production began in 2025. The series is produced by CN Ring Productions in association with Hideaway Pictures. Executive producers include Landon Jr., Bird, LaZebnik, Mike Vogel, and Philip Gulley.

== Release ==
The series premiered on the Angel streaming platform on November 18, 2026, launching with an extended pilot episode.
