= Kevin McGarry (actor) =

Canadian actor, director, and writer

- Born: March 18, 1985 (age 41); Kincardine, Ontario, Canada
- Occupations: Actor, director, writer
- Years active: 2006–present
- Known for: When Calls the Heart, Heartland, The Wedding Veil
- Spouse: Kayla Wallace (m. 2024)
- Children: 1

Kevin W. McGarry (born March 18, 1985) is a Canadian actor, director, and writer best known for his roles as Nathan Grant on the Hallmark Channel series When Calls the Heart, Mitch Cutty on CBC Television's long running series Heartland, and Peter Hastings in The Wedding Veil film series. He has appeared in numerous romantic comedies and television movies, primarily for Hallmark Channel and is well known Hallmark actor.

== Early life ==
Born in Kincardine, Ontario, Canada on March 18, 1985. McGarry developed an interest in acting by chance during high school when he wandered into a 12th grade theatre class as a freshman.

McGarry attended George Brown College; studied theatre at Fanshawe College and further honed his skills at Pro Actors Lab in Toronto.

== Theatre ==
Before launching his television career, McGarry appeared across Canadian stages. McGarry performed at the Shaw Festival and Charlottetown Festival, among others appearing in productions like A Midsummer Night’s Dream. McGarry also performed in Nebraska, Funny Business, His Gal Friday, Anne of Green Gables,The Full Mounty, Come Back, Little Sheba, Peace In Our Time, Enchanted April, and She Loves Me .

| Year | Production | Role | Venue / Company | Reference |
|---|---|---|---|---|
| 2014 | She Loves Me | Steven | Thousand Islands Playhouse | |
| 2013 | Peace in Our Time | Bob Tarkenton | Shaw Festival | |
| 2013 | Enchanted April | Antony Wilding | Shaw Festival | |
| 2012 | His Girl Friday | Kruger | Shaw Festival | |
| 2012 | Come Back, Little Sheba | Turk | Shaw Festival | |
| — | Anne of Green Gables | Swing | Charlottetown Festival | |
| — | The Full Monty | Keno | Charlottetown Festival | |
| 2009 | Nebraska | Charlie | Toronto Fringe Festival | |
| — | A Midsummer Night’s Dream | Oberon | Hart House Theatre | |
| — | Funny Business: The Musical | Marcus | Vaughan City Playhouse | |

== Film and television ==
McGarry has had many guest roles throughout his career including guest spots on Lovebites (2007), Being Erica (2009), Turn the Beat Around (2010) on MTV, Murdoch Mysteries (2015), Private Eyes (2016), Man Seeking Woman (2017), Saving Hope (2017), The Bold Type (2018), Ransom (2018), Taken (2018), When Hope Calls (2019), Schitt’s Creek (2020), and The Night Agent (2023).

“After years of hard work doing theatre productions, musicals, and small film and TV roles, McGarry has finally landed a lead in the new YTV Canada show Open Heart.” His breakout role was as Dr. Timothy “Hud” Hudson on Open Heart (2015, 12 episodes). He went on to star as Mitch Cutty in Canadian Broadcasting Company's Heartland from 2016–2021. He was one of the cast members of Christmas Cookie Matchup (2019) on Hallmark Channel.

In a 2015 interview with the Canadian media outlet V13.net, McGarry discussed his transition from supporting roles to leading performances, including his work on the medical drama Open Heart and his early growth in front of the camera.

In 2019, McGarry joined the cast of the Hallmark Channel drama series When Calls the Heart as Constable Nathan Grant, a principled Mountie who quickly became a fan favorite. His character was introduced during Season 6 and has remained a central figure alongside series lead Erin Krakow. McGarry’s work on the show significantly expanded his presence within the Hallmark Channel family, leading to additional lead roles in multiple Hallmark Channel original movies. The Hallmark Channel officially renewed When Calls the Heart for a thirteenth season following the finale of Season 12 on 23 March 2025, with the new season scheduled to premiere in 2026.

In June 2024, Southern Living published a feature profiling McGarry’s role in When Calls the Heart leading up to the Season 11 finale. McGarry reflected on developing Nathan’s character, emphasizing the depth of his relationship with his adopted daughter Allie and the strength of the show’s ensemble cast. He praised the series’ emotional storytelling and the solid foundation of friendship and trust that underpins key plot moments.

In March 2025, When Calls the Heart Season 12—featuring McGarry as Nathan Grant—ranked as the most-watched entertainment cable program year-to-date, according to Nielsen Media Research Live+3 data, drawing 6.1 million total unduplicated viewers across its 12-episode run. This performance highlights McGarry's significant presence on a top-performing series and reinforces his contribution to its continued success.

In March 2025, McGarry was interviewed by Cinemablend ahead of Season 13 of When Calls the Heart. He expressed interest in exploring more of Nathan Grant’s backstory, including introducing his character’s mother. McGarry lightheartedly suggested that actress Sally Field would be a dream casting choice, underscoring his engagement with the character's development and potential future arcs.

McGarry also stars in The Wedding Veil film series on the Hallmark Channel, opposite Lacey Chabert. He portrays Peter Hastings, a charming wealthy man who becomes romantically involved with Lacey Chabert's character Avery. The trilogy, which blends a bit of magic, romance, and historical intrigue, has become one of Hallmark Channel’s most successful movie franchises.

In 2025, McGarry starred in the romantic drama Villa Amore on the Hallmark Channel, opposite Eloise Mumford. Filmed on location in Italy, the film follows Leo, a lawyer, who after moving to Italy to help his grandmother, falls for the newest visitor in town. Speaking about the experience, McGarry said, “My weekends were filled with wandering the streets of the city in search of the next carbonara and Barolo!”

McGarry appeared in the fourth season of Family Law in 2025--playing a potential love interest for Abigail "Abby" Bianchi (portrayed by Jewel Staite). In this season, McGarry’s character was featured in four episodes—specifically episodes 4 (“Autonomy”), 7 (“Knowing Me, Knowing You”), 8 (“Valley of the Dolls”), and 10 (“Second Chances”).

McGarry had his feature film debut with a small role in Saw 3D: The Final Chapter (2010). He has gone on to star in many made-for-TV movies for networks like Hallmark Channel and Lifetime Network (Lifetime Entertainment Services). His credits include: Signed, Sealed, Delivered: From Paris With Love (2015), Country Crush (2016), Love At First Bark (2017), A Song for Christmas (2017), Autumn Stables (2018), Winter Castle (2019), Random Acts of Christmas (2019), A Christmas Scavenger Hunt (2019), Hometown Holiday (2019), A Very Corgi Christmas (2019), The Wedding Veil (2022), The Wedding Veil Legacy (2022), Feeling Butterflies (2022), My Grown-Up Christmas List (2022), The Wedding Veil Expectations (2023), Checkin' It Twice (2023), A Reason for the Season (2024), and Villa Amore (2025).

McGarry has also been involved in many short films such as: A Rock and A Hard Place (2006), Cigarettes Hurt Babies (2009),Turn the Beat Around (2010) Lucky (2012),the biopic Hugh & I (2014), Away (2015 – music video), Happy F#@%ing New Year (2016), Falling Through the Cracks: Greg’s Story (2018), and Dead Weight (2019).

McGarry is credited for co-writing the biopic Hugh & I (2014), the playwright for "Nebraska" (2009) and directing the short film, Happy F#@%ing New Year (2016). *Hugh & I* won the 2014 Toronto Fringe Festival Patron’s Pick award, underscoring his multifaceted career as both actor and writer.

In 2024 and 2025, McGarry received increased media coverage through exclusive interviews with major entertainment outlets. He was featured in multiple segments by Entertainment Tonight that highlighted romantic plot lines for his character Nathan Grant and included on-set interviews with co-star Erin Krakow. In 2025, Good Housekeeping profiled his upcoming Hallmark Channel movie Villa Amore and published a separate piece focused on his public support of fellow actor and wife Kayla Wallace.

== Personal life ==
McGarry confirmed beginning a relationship with When Calls the Heart co-star Kayla Wallace in 2020. The couple announced their engagement in 2022 and their marriage in 2024. Kevin McGarry and Kayla Wallace have appeared together in Hallmark Channel’s When Calls the Heart, Feeling Butterflies, and My Grown-Up Christmas List. On November 11, 2025 the couple shared that they were expecting their first baby. On May 10, 2026 the couple announced via instagram the arrival of their first child.

== Filmography ==
=== Film and Television Movies ===
| Title | Type | Role | Ref |
|---|---|---|---|
| Signed, Sealed, Delivered: From Paris with Love | Film (TV Movie) | Joey Castellucci | |
| Country Crush | Film (TV Movie) | Cody Bishop | |
| Love at First Bark | Film (TV Movie) | Owen Michaels | |
| A Song for Christmas | Film (TV Movie) | Dillon Lapp | |
| Autumn Stables | Film (TV Movie) | Jake Stevens | |
| Winter Castle | Film (TV Movie) | Craig | |
| Random Acts of Christmas | Film (TV Movie) | Colin Hauer | |
| A Christmas Scavenger Hunt | Film (TV Movie) | Dustin Cooper | |
| A Very Corgi Christmas | Film (TV Movie) | Ben | |
| The Wedding Veil Trilogy | Film (TV Movies) | Peter Hastings | |
| Feeling Butterflies | Film (TV Movie) | Garrett Thorson | |
| My Grown-Up Christmas List | Film (TV Movie) | Luke Malone | |
| Checkin’ It Twice | Film (TV Movie) | Scott | |
| A Reason for the Season | Film (TV Movie) | Kyle Newman | |
| Villa Amore | Film (TV Movie) | Leo | |

=== Television ===
| Title | Years | Role | Ref |
|---|---|---|---|
| Family Law | 2025 | Kieran | |
| When Calls the Heart | 2019–present | Nathan Grant | |
| Heartland | 2016–2021 | Mitch Cutty | |
| Open Heart | 2015 | Dr. Timothy "Hud" Hudson | |
| Saving Hope | 2017 | Dustin Meyer | |
| Murdoch Mysteries | 2015 | Benson | |
| The Bold Type | 2018 | Dillon Frank | |
| Taken | 2018 | Officer Shine | |
| Ransom | 2018 | Michael Reed | |
| Private Eyes | 2017 | Ken Barnes | |
| Love Bites | 2007 | Kevin | |
| Being Erica | 2009 | Rob | |
