= Finding Mr. Christmas season 1 =

Finding Mr. Christmas
- Season 1
- Promotional poster for season one
- Presented by: Jonathan Bennett
- Judges: Jonathan Bennett; Melissa Peterman
- No. of contestants: 10
- Winner: Ezra Moreland
- No. of episodes: 8

Release
- Original network: Hallmark+
- Original release: October 31 – December 12, 2024

Season chronology
- Next → Season 2

The first season of the American reality competition television series Finding Mr. Christmas premiered on October 31, 2024 on Hallmark+. The season was hosted by Jonathan Bennett.

A cast of ten men competed in Christmas-themed challenges in order to win the title of "Mr. Christmas," as well as the leading role in a Hallmark Christmas movie titled Happy Howlidays. The season concluded on December 12, 2024, and was won by Ezra Moreland.

== Contestants ==
Ages, names, and cities stated are at time of filming.

Contestants of Finding Mr. Christmas season 1
Contestant	Age	Hometown	Occupation	Outcome
Ezra Moreland	31	San Diego, California	Model and former Navy rescue diver	Winner
Hayden Maher	30	Los Angeles, California	Children's entertainer	Runner-Up
Elijah Malcomb	31	Lodi, N.J.	Actor	Eliminated 3rd
Blake Kelley	36	Beaumont, Texas	Sales manager	Eliminated 4th
Jonathan Wells	27	Chicago, Illinois	Entrepreneur	Eliminated 5th
Parker Gregory	39	League City, Texas	Model	Eliminated 6th
Gage Robinson	29	Los Angeles, California	Marketing consultant	Eliminated 7th
Daxton Bloomquist	36	Los Angeles, California	Actor	Withdrew (Note: Daxton developed a retinal detachment and withdrew to get it fixed) (8th)
David Habashy	29	Vancouver, British Columbia	Aerospace engineer	Eliminated 9th
Isaac Ramirez	28	Santa Clarita, California	Firefighter	Eliminated 10th

=== Contestant progress ===
Legend:

WINNER indicates that the contestant was named Mr. Christmas.
RUNNER-UP indicates that the contestant was runner-up.
THIRD indicates that the contestant came in 3rd Place.
WIN indicates that the contestant won the Star Quality Challenge.
SAFE indicates that the contestant neither won nor was eliminated.
BTM (Bottom) indicates that the contestant was up for elimination.
ELIM (Eliminated) indicates that the contestant was eliminated.
WD indicates that the contestant withdrew.

Progress of contestants including placements in each episode
Contestant	Episode							
Contestant	1	2	3	4	5	6	7	8
Ezra Moreland	SAFE	SAFE	BTM	WIN	SAFE	SAFE	WIN	WINNER
Hayden Maher	WIN	SAFE	SAFE	BTM	SAFE	WIN	BTM	RUNNER-UP
Elijah Malcomb	SAFE	BTM	WIN	SAFE	WIN	SAFE	SAFE	THIRD
Blake Kelley	SAFE	SAFE	SAFE	SAFE	SAFE	BTM	ELIM	
Jonathan Wells	SAFE	SAFE	BTM	SAFE	BTM	ELIM		
Parker Gregory	BTM	WIN	SAFE	ELIM	ELIM			
Gage Robinson	SAFE	BTM	ELIM					
Daxton Bloomquist	SAFE	SAFE	WD					
David Habashy	BTM	ELIM						
Isaac Ramirez	ELIM							

== Episodes ==
No. overall	No. in season	Title	Original release date
1	1	"The Hunt For Mr. Christmas"	October 31, 2024
The ten contestants enter the house and get to know each other. Jonathan Bennett greets them and introduces them to the competition rules. For their first Festive Face Off, the contestants have to design an ugly Christmas sweater and wear it on the runway in front of Bennett and Melissa Peterman. Isaac was declared the winner of the first Festive Face Off. For their main Star Quality challenge, the contestants had to star in a short movie scene in pairs. In the scene, the contestants had to fight for the attention of the female lead, who was portrayed by Erin Cahill, who also served as the guest judge for this challenge. As the winner of the Festive Face Off, Isaac got to pair up the contestants. The judges declared Hayden as "tonight's shining star," i.e., the winner of the first Star Quality challenge. Isaac and Parker were selected as the two weakest performing contestants, with Issac getting eliminated from the competition.: Festive Face Off Challenge: Decorate an ugly Christmas sweater; Festive Face Off Challenge winner: Isaac; Star Quality Challenge: Fight for the female lead's attention in a scripted scene; Star Quality Challenge winner: Hayden; Bottom Two: Isaac and Parker; Eliminated: Isaac
2	2	"Mr. December"	October 31, 2024
3	3	"Falling for you"	November 7, 2024
4	4	"The Talented Mr. Christmas"	November 14, 2024
5	5	"Laughing All the Way"	November 21, 2024
6	6	"The Festive Five"	November 28, 2024
7	7	"A Christmas Waltz"	December 5, 2024
8	8	"Our Christmas Star"	December 12, 2024
