= Kayla Wallace =

Canadian actress, dancer and singer (born 1993)

- Born: October 31, 1993 (age 33); Vancouver Island, British Columbia, Canada
- Occupations: Actress; Dancer
- Years active: 2015–present
- Spouse: Kevin McGarry (m. 2024)
- Children: 1

Kayla Wallace (born October 31, 1993) is a Canadian actress and dancer. She is best known for playing Fiona Miller in the western drama series When Calls the Heart and Rebecca Falcone in the drama series Landman.

== Early life ==
Wallace was born on Vancouver Island, British Columbia. She is a graduate of the Canadian College Of Performing Arts. In 2014 she moved to Vancouver on a permanent basis to further her acting career.

== Career ==
Wallace made her on screen debut with a minor appearance in the musical fantasy film Descendants. She made guest appearances in popular shows such as The Good Doctor and Zoey's Extraordinary Playlist. Her first big role came playing Fiona Miller in the western drama series When Calls the Heart (2019–2025).

Her biggest role so far has been playing lawyer Rebecca Falcone in the drama series Landman (2024–present). The show has a much more mainstream following than anything she had done previously. It also propelled her into a cast with several prominent figures in Hollywood, including Billy Bob Thornton, Demi Moore, and Jon Hamm. Furthermore, the show has a very large viewership.

As of April 24, 2026, Wingman, a comedy film starring Wallace was announced to have May theatrical releases in Canada and Australia ahead of its May 26 release on Apple TV.

== Personal life ==
Wallace began dating her When Calls the Heart co-star Kevin McGarry in November 2020. In December 2022 they announced their engagement and in September 2024 they confirmed they were married. In November 2025 the couple announced they were expecting their first child.

== Filmography ==
=== Film ===
Year	Title	Role	Notes
2015	Descendants	Dance and Chorus performer	
2016	Death Of A Vegas Showgirl	Alicia	
2017	A Song For Christmas	Melissa Prentiss	
2018	Once Upon a Prince	Avery	
2018	Killer Ending	Sarah	
2018	Counterfeiting in Suburbia	Erica	
2019	Terrified at 17	Julie Price	
2019	Undercover Cheerleader	Autumn Bailey	
2019	Breckman Rodeo	Samantha	
2021	Christmas Au Pair	Kaley	
2022	Heatwave	Olivia	
2022	Feeling Butterflies	Emily	
2019	My Grown-Up Christmas List	Taylor Nichols	
2025	Wingman	Holly	

=== Television ===
Year	Title	Role	Notes
2016	Ice	Misty	Episode: ''Hyenas''
2017	The Good Doctor	Grace Mitchell	Episode: ''Sacrifice''
2020	The Magicians	Natasha Mayakovsky	2 episodes
2021	Zoey's Extraordinary Playlist	Amber	Episode; Zoey's Extraordinary Session
2019-2025	When Calls the Heart	Fiona Miller	Main role
2024-Present	Landman	Rebecca Falcone	Main role
