= Not Easily Broken =

- Theatrical release poster
- Directed by: Bill Duke
- Screenplay by: Brian Bird
- Based on: Not Easily Broken by T. D. Jakes
- Produced by: Brian Bird; T. D. Jakes; Clint Culpepper; Aaron Norris; Curtis Wallace
- Starring: Morris Chestnut; Taraji P. Henson; Kevin Hart; Jenifer Lewis; Maeve Quinlan; Wood Harris
- Cinematography: Geary McLeod
- Edited by: Josh Rifkin
- Music by: Kurt Farquhar
- Distributed by: TriStar Pictures (through Sony Pictures Releasing)
- Release date: January 9, 2009
- Running time: 99 minutes
- Country: United States
- Language: English
- Budget: $5 million
- Box office: $10.7 million

Not Easily Broken is a 2009 American romantic comedy-drama film directed by Bill Duke. The film is written by Brian Bird based on T. D. Jakes' 2006 novel of the same name. It stars Taraji P. Henson and Morris Chestnut.

== Plot ==
Dave and Clarice Johnson have reached a breaking point in their marriage. When Clarice is injured in a car crash, her mother Mary intervenes. The obvious truth that more than just her injuries need immediate attention is exposed. Clarice begins to be treated by Julie, a physical therapist. Dave develops a friendship with Julie and her young son Bryson. The acceptance and comfort Dave finds in the two stirs his longing for a family and a passionate partner. When Bryson unexpectedly dies in a swimming accident, Dave and Julie's relationship grows closer as Clarice pulls further away. Dave and Clarice must confront whether their marriage vows are or are not easily broken. Dave later visits Julie after she calls him, and he comforts her in her grief. They begin to kiss, but Dave realizes it is Clarice he truly wants. The couple reunites once Clarice expresses to him the reasons for her mother having such a big input in their marriage. They reunite and Dave finds out that Clarice is pregnant.

== Cast ==
- Morris Chestnut as Dave Johnson
- Taraji P. Henson as Clarice Clark-Johnson
- Maeve Quinlan as Julie Sawyer
- Kevin Hart as Tree
- Wood Harris as Darnell Gooden
- Eddie Cibrian as Brock Houseman
- Jenifer Lewis as Mary "Mama" Clark
- Niecy Nash as Michelle
- Cannon Jay as Bryson Sawyer
- Albert Hall as Bishop Wilkes
- Henry Brown Jr. as Mr. Reid
- T. D. Jakes as Allen

== Awards ==
At the Black Reel Awards, Bill Duke was nominated for Best Director, and Brian Bird was nominated for Best Screenplay, Original or Adapted.

Taraji P. Henson won Best Actress at the BET Awards for her role in the film combined with two other performances in The Curious Case of Benjamin Button, and The Family That Preys.

Albert Hall won the Grace Award for Movies at the 2010 Movieguide Awards.

== Reception ==
The film has received mainly mixed reviews from critics. As of June 2020, Rotten Tomatoes reports a 31% approval rating, based on 68 reviews with an average of 4.65/10. The website's critics consensus reads: "Though well-intentioned, Not Easily Broken is bogged down by melodramatic plotting and stereotypical characters". Another review aggregator, Metacritic, gave the film a 43/100 approval rating based on 18 reviews.

== Box office performance ==
On its opening weekend, it opened #9 with $5,600,000 in 724 theaters with an $7,735 average. In total it made a domestic gross of $10,572,742.
