= Wendy Lyon =

Canadian actress

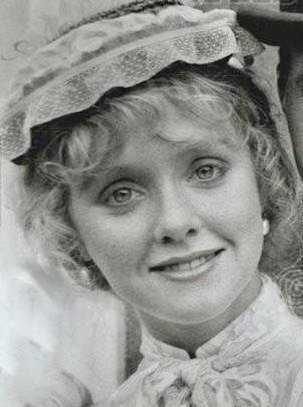
- Lyon on American Playhouse, 1986
- Born: 1960 (age 65–66); Canada
- Occupation: Actress
- Years active: 1985–present
- Spouse: Ken Girotti
- Children: 1

Wendy Lyon (born 1960) is a Canadian film and television actress. She began her career in television, appearing in the miniseries Anne of Green Gables (1985) before having a recurring role on the Canadian series The Campbells (1986–1990). She made her feature film debut in a leading role in the supernatural horror film Hello Mary Lou: Prom Night II (1987).

Lyon continued to appear on television throughout the 1990s, including providing the voice of Queen Serenity in the animated series Sailor Moon (1995). She returned to film with supporting roles in Focus (2001) and Childstar (2004). In the 2010s, she appeared in supporting parts in the thriller Regression (2015), Guillermo del Toro's fantasy film The Shape of Water (2017), and in a recurring role in the political thriller series Designated Survivor (2019).

== Career ==
In 1985, Lyon appeared in the Canadian miniseries Anne of Green Gables as Prissy Andrews. The following year, she starred in an episode of American Playhouse, "Valentine's Revenge," opposite Victor Ertmanis. Lyon subsequently had a recurring role as Rebecca Simms in the series The Campbells, in which she appeared between 1986 and 1990. She made her feature film debut as the lead in the supernatural horror film Hello Mary Lou: Prom Night II (1987), playing a teenager haunted (and eventually possessed) by a vengeful spirit. Betsy Sherman praised Lyon's performance, writing that "Lyon does a good job making the transition from fair to foul."

Lyon went on to work in television through the 1980s and 1990s, and provided voice work for multiple episodes of Sailor Moon in 1995. She returned to film with a minor role in the drama Focus (2001), starring William H. Macy and Laura Dern, followed by the independent comedy Childstar (2004). In 2010, she appeared in three episodes of the ABC series Happy Town. Lyon had a minor role in the psychological thriller Regression (2015) before appearing in Guillermo del Toro's critically acclaimed fantasy film The Shape of Water (2017). In 2019, Lyon had a multi-episode arc on the American political thriller series Designated Survivor, starring Kiefer Sutherland.

== Personal life ==
Lyon is married to director Ken Girotti, with whom she has one daughter, Erika.

== Filmography ==
=== Film ===
Year	Title	Role	Notes	Ref.
1987	Hello Mary Lou: Prom Night II	Vicki Carpenter		
1989	Brown Bread Sandwiches	Miss Walsh		
1990	Divided Loyalties	Lady Mary Johnson		
1997	Breach of Faith: A Family of Cops 2	Mrs. Baskin	Television film	
1999	Hidden Agenda	Donna Barnes		
2000	The Sandy Bottom Orchestra	Mrs. Erickson	Television film	
2001	Focus	Elsie		
2004	Childstar	Miss Kelly		
2007	Lightchasers	Natalie	Short film	
2007	Kaw	Luanne		
2007	Lies and Crimes	Marcia	Television film	
2008	Menace	Sally Ranfield	Television film	
2015	Regression	Norma		
2017	The Shape of Water	Sally		
2022	All I Didn’t Want for Christmas	Linda	Television film	

=== Television ===
Year	Title	Role	Notes	Ref.
1985	Anne of Green Gables	Prissy Andrews	Miniseries	
1986	American Playhouse	Annabel	Episode: "Valentine's Revenge"	
1987	Night Heat	Betty Sansa	Episode: "Limo"	
1988	Friday the 13th: The Series	Mary Fraser	Episode: "And Now the News"	
1990	T. and T.	Beth Knightly	Episode: "Decker's Ex"	
1986–1990	The Campbells	Rebecca Sims	35 episodes	
1993	E.N.G.	Carole	Episode: "Mirror, Mirror"	
1995	Kung Fu: The Legend Continues	Cynthia	Episode: "May I Walk with You"	
1995	TekWar	Jenny	Episode: "Forget Me Not"	
1995	Sailor Moon	Queen Serenity / Stormy Kincaid / various	6 episodes; voice role	
1997	Dead Man's Gun	Erica Beacon	Episode: "Buryin' Sam"	
1998	Earth: Final Conflict	Sarah Boone	Episode: "Through the Looking Glass"	
2000	Real Kids, Real Adventures	Mom	Episode: "Explosion: The Christopher Wise Story"	
2001	Twice in a Lifetime	Jane	Episode: "Daddy's Girl"	
2002	Street Time	Mrs. Sloan	Episode: "Random Act"	
2002	Soul Food	Tammy Beal	Episode: "Let's Do it Again"	
2008	The Border	June Barden	Episode: "Articles of Faith"	
2009	Murdoch Mysteries	Melva Moffat	Episode: "Snakes and Ladders"	
2010	Happy Town	Donna Friddle	3 episodes	
2011	Warehouse 13	Mrs. Bell	Episode: "Trials"	
2012	Wrath of Grapes: The Don Cherry Story II	Maude Cherry	Episode: "Night One"	
2012	The Listener	Christine Lawrence	Episode: "Curtain Call"	
2013	Call Me Fitz	Maggie Murphy	Episode: "The Hard Wiener of Truth"	
2017	Pure	Irma Wiebe	5 episodes	
2019	Designated Survivor	Carrie Rhodes	8 episodes	
2026	Home to Harmony	Gloria Gardner	TV Series	
