= Regression (film) =

2015 film by Alejandro Amenábar

- Theatrical release poster
- Directed by: Alejandro Amenábar
- Written by: Alejandro Amenábar
- Produced by: Fernando Bovaira; Alejandro Amenábar; Christina Piovesan
- Starring: Ethan Hawke; Emma Watson; David Thewlis; Lothaire Bluteau; Dale Dickey; David Dencik; Peter MacNeill; Devon Bostick; Aaron Ashmore
- Cinematography: Daniel Aranyó
- Edited by: Carolina Martínez Urbina; Geoff Ashenhurst
- Music by: Roque Baños
- Production companies: Mod Entertainment; Mod Producciones; Himenóptero; First Generation Films; Telefónica Studios; Regression A.I.E.; FilmNation Entertainment; Telefilm Canada; Mediaset España; Canal+; I.C.A.A.
- Distributed by: Universal Pictures (Spain); Elevation Pictures (Canada); The Weinstein Company (United States)
- Release dates: September 18, 2015 (SSIFF); October 2, 2015 (Spain); October 30, 2015 (Canada)
- Running time: 106 minutes
- Countries: Canada; Spain; United States
- Language: English
- Budget: $15 million
- Box office: $17.7 million

Regression is a 2015 American-Canadian psychological thriller Horror mystery film directed and written by Alejandro Amenábar. The film stars Ethan Hawke and Emma Watson, with David Thewlis, Lothaire Bluteau, Dale Dickey, David Dencik, Peter MacNeill, Devon Bostick, and Aaron Ashmore in supporting roles.

The film had its world premiere at the San Sebastián International Film Festival on September 18, 2015. It was released in the United States on October 9, 2015, by The Weinstein Company under the banner RADiUS-TWC. The film received mostly negative reviews from critics.

== Plot ==
In Hoyer, Minnesota, in 1990, Detective Bruce Kenner investigates the case of John Gray, who admits to sexually abusing his 17-year-old daughter Angela but has no recollection of the abuse. They seek the help of Professor Kenneth Raines to use recovered-memory therapy on John Gray to retrieve his memories, and come to suspect that their colleague Detective George Nesbitt is involved. They detain him but fail to find evidence against him. Detectives suspect a satanic cult is involved because of Angela's testimony, in which Angela says that she was abused by people in masks and someone took pictures of it.

Bruce and Kenneth meet Angela's estranged brother Roy Gray in Pittsburgh, Pennsylvania to inquire about why he left the house. Using the regression technique on him, he recalls hooded figures entering his room while he was young. Bruce and Kenneth suspect Roy's grandmother, Rose Gray, has some involvement but find nothing after a search of her house.

Meanwhile, Bruce begins having nightmares involving satanic rituals. Angela tells him that the cult is out to kill her as she has shown her demonic mark to him and that he is in danger as well. She tells him that her mother received miscellaneous calls and saw strange figures staring at her in the street before she herself had an accident. Bruce starts to experience the same things and his nightmares increase in intensity.

Rose jumps from the window of her house after seeing ghostly figures, injuring herself. Bruce meets Angela in the church's cemetery to reassure her and after an emotional outburst, she kisses him. Shocked, Bruce leaves her there and returns to his home. He sees a soup advertisement on the street and recognizes the woman in it as the one he sees in his nightmares. He concludes that his imagination has run away with him. He tells Kenneth that all these past memories are induced by therapy and the whole situation is just the result of mass hysteria. Though the professor is initially resistant to the idea, he too comes to suspect that these memories were not real.

Bruce is attacked by two hooded figures who finally reveal themselves as George and their colleague, Farrell. George was seeking revenge after Bruce detained him as a child molester and ruined his career. Bruce offers to forget the whole situation if George tells him everything he knows. After George reveals things, Bruce confronts Angela about her abuse and she insists she told the truth. Finally, Bruce concludes that she was fabricating everything from the beginning as she wanted to escape from her family, whom she believes to be responsible for her mother's death. She wanted to elope with George, as they had a sexual relationship for some time, but he refused to elope with a minor. Angela accused her father in order to escape the house, something George hinted at before to Bruce. When Bruce confronts her, she tells him that no one is going to believe him, especially if she tells them that they kissed in the cemetery. Bruce leaves and tells John everything but John decides to still take the blame as a form of making up to her for being a bad father for all these years. Angela is shown giving interview with media outlet and pushing her 'satanic cult' narrative.

== Cast ==
- Ethan Hawke as Detective Bruce Kenner
- Emma Watson as Angela Gray
- David Thewlis as Professor Kenneth Raines
- Lothaire Bluteau as Reverend Murray
- Dale Dickey as Rose Gray, Angela's grandmother.
- David Dencik as John Gray, Angela's father.
- Peter MacNeill as Police Chief Cleveland
- Devon Bostick as Roy Gray, Angela's brother.
- Aaron Ashmore as Detective George Nesbitt
- Adam Butcher as Brody
- Kristian Bruun as Andrew
- Aaron Abrams as Farrell
- Julian Richings as Tom
- Wendy Lyon as Norma
- Janet Porter as S. Cooper

== Production ==
On October 31, 2013, it was announced that Ethan Hawke would star in the thriller film Regression. On February 5, 2014, Emma Watson joined the film to star with Hawke, and on March 25, David Dencik was added to the cast, playing a man who is arrested in a Minnesota town for allegedly sexually abusing his daughter. On May 23, Devon Bostick was added to the cast of the film.

Alejandro Amenábar directed his own script, while FilmNation Entertainment holds international rights.

=== Filming ===
Principal photography began on April 15, 2014, in Mississauga, Ontario, Canada. Emma Watson stated, "First day shooting Regression today – a very cool birthday present xx." On the day, which was her 24th birthday, she filmed a church scene near the University of Toronto Mississauga. Shooting was taking place in Tottenham on May 5. On June 3, it was reported that Watson was back in Toronto to continue the rest of filming after spending some time in the UK and graduating from Brown. Principal photography concluded June 12. On January 28, 2015, the crew filmed several additional scenes or reshoots in Mississauga.

== Marketing ==
On June 10, 2014, TWC-Dimension revealed a first look photo from the film. On February 12, 2015, the first trailer was released, and on February 1, 2016, the U.S. trailer premiered.

== Release ==
In November 2013, TWC-Dimension acquired US distribution rights to the film. The film had its world premiere at the San Sebastián International Film Festival on September 18, 2015. It was released in Spain on October 2, 2015 and in the United Kingdom on October 9, 2015.

Regression was originally set for an August 28, 2015 release in the U.S., but was pulled from the schedule. It was then pushed back to its eventual U.S. theatrical date of February 5, 2016, and was released on Amazon Instant Video thirty days later.

== Reception ==
Regression received generally negative reviews from critics upon release, with criticism focused on the film's third act. Review aggregator website Rotten Tomatoes reported a 14% rating, based on 42 reviews, leaving a rating average of 4.1/10. The site's consensus reads, "Regression boasts a pair of eminently likable leads – neither of whom are able to dislodge the movie from the mire of psychological thriller mediocrity." On Metacritic, the film has a score of 32 out of 100, based on 12 critics, indicating "generally unfavorable reviews".

The film opened at the box office, grossing just $55,039 in its domestic run in theaters. The film would eventually gross 17.7 million USD worldwide, on a budget of 15 million USD. Mark Kermode, of The Guardian, wrote that the film was "largely forgettable fare, but at least its unhysterical heart is in the right place."

Despite a disappointing domestic run at the box office, the film was number one at the weekend box office in Spain from October 4 to the October 11, 2015. In 2015, Regression had the highest opening-weekend gross at the Spanish box office for any homegrown film, earning $2.87 million (€2.55 million). The film garnered 40 percent of the Spanish box office on 370 screens.

== See also ==
- List of Spanish films of 2015
