= Loretta Walsh (actress) =

Australian-Canadian actress

- Born: Queensland, Australia
- Occupation: Actress
- Years active: 1999–present

Loretta Walsh is an Australian-Canadian actress. She is best known for playing Florence in the western drama series When Calls the Heart.

== Early life ==
Walsh was born in Queensland. She has 3 siblings. She grew up on a farm in a small town and realised at a young age that she wouldn't live there to long as she wanted to see the world. She liked entertaining her family by acting as different characters when she was young .She moved to Sydney as an adult to further her acting career. While in Sydney she met her future husband who was Canadian and decided to move to Canada to with him.

== Career ==
Early on in her career she made an appearance in the romantic comedy-drama series No Tomorrow and had a recurring role on the drama series A Series playing Norma Rae. Her biggest role so far has been playing Florence in the western drama series When Calls the Heart. She has made an appearance in the superhero series Batwoman portraying Roxanne. She has also made appearances in the drama thriller series Bates Motel and in the drama thriller film The Sinners. She played Maxine, one of the lead roles of the drama film A Picture Perfect Wedding.

== Personal life ==
Walsh is the founder of the Kindred Theatre. She teaches Scene Study at the Haven Acting Studio in Vancouver. In her spare time she likes to travel and go skydiving. She has had many other jobs other than being an actress such as working at KFC, being a nanny, a bartender, a teacher, a producer, working in events, a wine company rep, worked for an airline, a temp, and a tour director,

== Filmography ==
=== Film ===
Year	Title	Role	Notes
2008	7 Things to Do Before I'm 30	Jewel Baylor	
2011	Magic Beyond Words	Dark Haired Mother	
2012	OMG	Susan	Short
2013	Down River	Victoria	
2014	Focus	Fran	
2015	No Men Beyond This Point	WCG Official	
2015	Her Infidelity	Wendy	
2015	Stolen Daughter	Julia	
2016	The Cleanse	Jill	
2016	Plan b	Debra	
2016	Rampage: President Down	Wk7 News Reporter	
2016	Marrying the Family	Kitty	
2019	Cold Pursuit	Resort Clerk	
2019	Over the Moon in Love	Heather Clarkson	
2020	The Sinners	Brenda Carver	
2021	A Picture Perfect Wedding	Maxine	
2022	Hot in Love	Karen Wagner	
2022	Never Broken	Hope	Short

=== Television ===
Year	Title	Role	Notes
1999	Water Rats	Traci	Episode; Good Times and Adventures
2010	Life Unexpected	Christine	Episode; Parents Unemployed
2011	CHAOS	Linda	Episode; Song of the North
2012	The Troop	Newswoman	Episode; A Sniff Too Far
2014	Psych	Agnes	Episode; 1967: A Psych Odyssey
2014	Bates Motel	PTA mom	Episode; Gone But Not Forgotten
2015	The Whispers	Lucas' Mom	Episode; The Archer
2017	No Tomorrow	Debbie Meyers	Episode; No Time Like the Present
2017	A Series	Norma Rae	2 episodes
2017	Project Mc2	Charlotte Rae	2 episodes
2019	Batwoman	Roxanna	Episode; Who Are You?
2020	How to Make It in Hollywood (When You Are Foreign AF)	Pam	Episode; New Year New Me
2020	Gabby Duran & the Unsittables	Mrs Mungo	Episode; Tailoring Swift
2023	Creepshow	Glora Veljohnson	Episode; Parent Death Thrap
2014-present	When Calls the Heart	Florence B'akeley	126 episodes
