= Brian Bird =

American film and television writer and producer

- Born: Kewanee, Illinois, U.S.
- Occupations: Writer, producer
- Years active: 1984 – present
- Spouse: Patty Bird
- Children: 5

Brian Bird is an American film and television writer and producer. He is best known for his work on Touched by an Angel, Not Easily Broken, Jamaa, Captive and The Case for Christ. He is also known as an executive producer and co-creator of the Hallmark Channel original series, When Calls the Heart.

== Life and career ==
Brian was born in Kewanee, Illinois. He then attended California State University, Fullerton, graduating with a bachelor's degree in journalism. Later, he worked for the San Gabriel Valley Tribune, World Vision magazine and Christianity Today. In 1984, he wrote his first screenplay for the TV Series, Fantasy Island.

Brian is the co-founder, along with Michael Landon, Jr., of Believe Pictures.

== Filmography ==
Year	Title	Contribution	Note
1984	Fantasy Island	Writer	TV series
1990-1991	The Family Man	Writer	TV series
1992	Evening Shade	Writer	TV series
1992	McGee and Me!	Writer	TV series
1993	Bopha!	Writer	Feature film
1996	Captive Heart: The James Mink Story	Writer	TV movie
1993-1998	Step by Step	Writer/Producer	TV series
2001	Water with Food Coloring	Associate producer	Short film
2001	Call Me Claus	Writer	TV movie
1999-2003	Touched by an Angel	Writer/Consulting producer/Co-executive producer	TV series
2004	Sue Thomas: F.B.Eye	Writer	TV series
2007	The Last Sin Eater	Writer/Producer	Feature film
2007	Saving Sarah Cain	Writer/Producer	Feature film
2007	Glue Boys	Producer	Documentary
2009	Not Easily Broken	Writer/Producer	Feature film
2011	The Shunning	Executive producer	TV movie
2011	Game Time: Tackling the Past	Writer	TV movie
2011	Jamaa	Writer/Producer	Short film
2013	The Confession	Writer/Executive producer	TV movie
2013	The Ultimate Life	Writer	Feature film
2013	When Calls the Heart	Executive producer	TV movie
2014–present	When Calls the Heart	Writer/Executive producer	TV series
2015	Captive	Writer/Executive producer	Feature film
2015	The Reckoning	Writer/Executive producer	TV movie
2016	Godspeed: The Race Across America	Executive producer	Documentary
2017	The Case for Christ	Writer/Co-producer	Feature film
2019	The Heart of Man	Executive producer	Documentary
2019, 2021	When Hope Calls	Executive producer	TV series
2020–present	Mystic	Executive producer	TV series; North American airings only
2026	Home to Harmony	Creator and Executive producer	TV series

== Publications ==
- 2018 - When God Calls the Heart ISBN 978-1-4245560-6-9
- 2018 - When God Calls the Heart at Christmas ISBN 978-1-4245572-8-8
- 2019 - When God Calls the Heart to Love ISBN 978-1-4245580-4-9

== Awards and nominations ==
Year	Result	Award	Category	Work	Ref.
2010	Nominated	Black Reel Awards	Outstanding Screenplay, Adapted or Original	Not Easily Broken	
2010	Won	Heartland Film Festival	Crystal Heart Award	Jamaa	
2014	Nominated	GMA Dove Award	Inspirational Film of the Year	When Calls the Heart	
2016	Won	Christopher Award	Christopher Spirit Award	When Calls the Heart	
2016	Won	Telly Awards	Entertainment	The Reckoning	
2016	Won	Telly Awards	Spirituality	The Reckoning	
