= When Calls the Heart =

Canadian Western romantic drama TV series

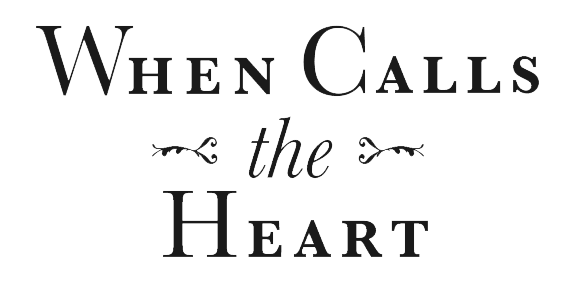
- Genre: Drama; Western; Romance
- Based on: When Calls the Heart by Janette Oke
- Developed by: Michael Landon Jr. & Brian Bird
- Showrunners: Michael Landon Jr.; Brian Bird; Robin Bernheim Burger; Tony Blake; Alfonso H. Moreno; John Tinker; Lindsay Sturman; Joy Gregory
- Starring: Erin Krakow; Daniel Lissing; Lori Loughlin; Martin Cummins; Jack Wagner; Pascale Hutton; Kavan Smith; Paul Greene; Andrea Brooks; Chris McNally; Kevin McGarry; Viv Leacock
- Countries of origin: United States; Canada
- Original language: English
- No. of seasons: 13
- No. of episodes: 143 (list of episodes)

Production
- Executive producers: Michael Landon Jr.; Jimmy Townsend; Roman Viaris; Francisco Gonzalez; Brian Bird; Brad Krevoy; Robin Bernheim Burger; Tony Blake; Alfonso H. Moreno; Vicki Sotheran; Greg Malcolm; Neill Fearnley; Susie Belzberg Krevoy; Michael Shepard; Eric Jarboe; John Tinker; Erin Krakow; Lindsay Sturman; Joy Gregory
- Producers: Vicki Sotheran; Greg Malcolm; Lori Loughlin
- Production locations: Vancouver, British Columbia, Canada
- Running time: 39–84 minutes
- Production companies: Believe Pictures; Brad Krevoy Television; Jordan Films

Original release
- Network: Hallmark Channel (United States); Super Channel (Canada)
- Release: January 11, 2014 – present

Related
- When Hope Calls; Hope Valley: 1874

When Calls the Heart is a Western romantic drama television series inspired by Janette Oke's book of the same name from her Canadian West series and created by Michael Landon Jr. and Brian Bird. The series began airing on the Hallmark Channel in the United States on January 11, 2014, and on Super Channel in Canada on April 16, 2014. As of 2026, the show has aired 13 seasons and five specials.

The show follows Erin Krakow as Elizabeth Thatcher, a young teacher who moves to a small coal-mining town. In 2019, during the airing of season six, the show went on a hiatus following actress Lori Loughlin's involvement in the Varsity Blues scandal. The season resumed with Loughlin's scenes edited out. Loughlin is set to return to the show in 2027 for season 14.

== Premise ==
Set in 1910, the story follows Elizabeth Thatcher (Krakow), a young teacher accustomed to her high-society life, who moves to Coal Valley, a small coal-mining town in Western Canada which is located just south of Robb, Alberta. Thatcher meets and falls in love with Royal Canadian Mounted Police Constable Jack Thornton (Daniel Lissing). Thatcher works to help the children of the town, and befriends many of the townsfolk including Abigail Stanton (Lori Loughlin), who recently lost her son and husband in a recent mine explosion. The town was renamed Hope Valley in the second season following the closing of the coal mine.

== Episodes ==
Season	Episodes	Originally shown	
Season	Episodes	First shown	Last shown
Pilot		October 19, 2013	
1	12	January 11, 2014	March 29, 2014
2	7	April 25, 2015	June 13, 2015
New Year's Wish		December 26, 2015	
3	8	February 21, 2016	April 10, 2016
Christmas		December 25, 2016	
4	10	February 19, 2017	April 23, 2017
The Christmas; Wishing Tree		December 25, 2017	
5	10	February 18, 2018	April 22, 2018
The Greatest; Christmas Wish (Blessing)		December 25, 2018	
6	9	February 24, 2019	June 2, 2019
Home for Christmas		December 25, 2019	
7	10	February 23, 2020	April 26, 2020
8	12	February 21, 2021	May 9, 2021
9	12	March 6, 2022	May 22, 2022
10	12	July 30, 2023	October 15, 2023
11	12	April 7, 2024	June 23, 2024
12	12	January 5, 2025	March 23, 2025
13	12	January 4, 2026	March 22, 2026

== Cast and characters ==
=== Main ===
- Erin Krakow as Elizabeth Thatcher Thornton: a passionate young teacher from city life. She found herself in Hope Valley, a small community on the Canadian frontier in need of a teacher, and quickly discovers it is not an easy place to live, lacking the creature comforts and luxuries of her privileged life with her family. After marrying Jack, Jack dies; shortly after the funeral, she finds out that she is pregnant. Elizabeth meets businessman Lucas Bouchard a year after Jack's death. They form a friendship based on their similar interests and strong intellectual connection. Lucas immediately falls in love with Elizabeth, but Elizabeth is still grieving Jack. The two eventually start dating, but he lets her go when he senses unresolved tension between Elizabeth and Nathan. This enables Elizabeth to recognize that her feelings for Nathan are her feelings for Jack that she has projected onto him. She realizes that she is in love with Lucas and they begin a courtship. Lucas proposes to Elizabeth in the Season 9 finale and she happily accepts. Their engagement is however broken off by Elizabeth in the Season 10 finale, because Elizabeth didn't wish to move to the capital with Lucas.
- Daniel Lissing as Jack Thornton (seasons 1–5): a Mountie and a man of stout character and integrity. He often finds himself protecting and saving people. Upon his first meeting of Elizabeth, Jack developed an instant dislike and it appeared she irritated him. However, as like Elizabeth, he grew to like her and eventually falls in love with her over time. He "dies" off-screen in a Mountie training camp in Season 5.
- Lori Loughlin as Abigail Stanton (seasons 1–6; guest season 13; 14): a Hope Valley woman whose husband and son died in the mining accident. She is a very kind woman, and she stands strongly for the things she believes in. She is one of the first women to welcome Elizabeth and the two women quickly become friends. Abigail's character was initially written off the show, halfway through season 6, following Loughlin's involvement in the 2019 college admissions bribery scandal, through the idea that Abigail had travelled "back east" to take care of her sick mother. Loughlin is set to reprise the role in season 14.
- Chelah Horsdal as Cat Montgomery (season 1): a woman of strong faith who teaches Sunday school after the church is destroyed. She is Gabe, Miles and Emily's mother.
- Martin Cummins as Henry Gowen: a businessman who managed the late Hope Valley mining company and was arrested for stealing town funds. With the help of Abigail, he is given a second chance and starts his own oil business in the town.
- Jack Wagner as Bill Avery (guest season 1; main season 2–present): a quiet but skilled man who acts as the town's sheriff and becomes the town's judge.
- Pascale Hutton as Rosemary LeVeaux Coulter (guest season 1; main season 2–present): a flamboyant, enthusiastic actress from New York. She was briefly engaged to Jack Thornton, but called it off due to their differences. She decides to stay in town, eventually falling in love with the sawmill owner, Lee Coulter.
- Kavan Smith as Leland Coulter (season 2–present): a kind, laid-back, patient man, who opens a sawmill in Hope Valley. He marries Rosemary.
- Andrea Brooks as Faith Carter (recurring seasons 2–5 & 7; main seasons 6, 8–present): a nurse (and later doctor) who visits from Elizabeth's home city to come work in Hope Valley. She falls in love with Carson.
- Paul Greene as Carson Shepherd (recurring seasons 4–5; main seasons 6–8): a doctor who works in Hope Valley and falls in love with Faith. He later leaves Hope Valley to join a large hospital.
- Eva Bourne as Clara Stanton Flynn (recurring seasons 2–5; main seasons 6–8): Abigail's daughter-in-law who worked at the Cafe and marries Jesse Flynn.
- Aren Buchholz as Jesse Flynn (recurring seasons 3–5; main seasons 6–8): a former outlaw, who lived in Hope Valley. He marries Clara.
- Chris McNally as Lucas Bouchard (season 6–present): a businessman who previously owned the Queen of Hearts saloon and Gowen Petroleum. He donates a building to Elizabeth so that she can open a public library for the town. Lucas and Elizabeth begin dating in Season 8 before briefly breaking up over misunderstandings. They reunite in the Season 8 finale and begin an official courtship after sharing their first kiss. Lucas and Elizabeth proclaim their love for each other and he proposes to her in the Season 9 finale, which she happily accepts. He later is elected Governor and Elizabeth breaks the engagement off.
- Kevin McGarry as Nathan Grant (season 6–present): who comes to Hope Valley with his niece, Allie. Nathan develops feelings for Elizabeth but is unable to ask her out. He proclaims his love for her in Season 8, but she rushes away in shock. It is eventually revealed that Nathan came to Hope Valley to protect Elizabeth and her son as he feels guilty that Jack died while he took his place for the training assignment. In the Season 8 finale, Elizabeth informs Nathan that she is not in love with him but will always care for him as a friend. After breaking off her engagement to Lucas at the end of Season 10, however, Elizabeth and Nathan both begin to discover they have feelings for one another. In the penultimate episode of Season 11, Elizabeth reveals that she is in love with Nathan, and Nathan confesses that he never stopped loving Elizabeth. The two share a kiss and begin a courtship.
- Viv Leacock as Joseph Canfield (recurring season 8; main season 9–present): a delivery driver who moves to Hope Valley and becomes the new pastor.

=== Recurring ===
- Charlotte Hegele as Julie Thatcher (recurring seasons 1–2 & 5; guest seasons 6, 10): Elizabeth's younger sister who longs for romance and adventure
- Erica Carroll as Dottie Ramsey (seasons 1–5): The widow of former town mayor Silas Ramsey, and a curious woman who is interested in everything happening in town.
- Loretta Walsh as Florence Blakeley Yost (season 1–present): A Hope Valley resident who is known to gossip. She later marries Ned Yost.
- Johannah Newmarch as Molly Sullivan (season 1–present): A Hope Valley resident who is the mother of Rosaleen. She worked for Bill as an office cleaner. She later becomes the receptionist and Carson and Faith's assistant at the infirmary.
- Hrothgar Mathews as Ned Yost (season 1–present): The owner and proprietor of the town's Mercantile. He has a daughter named Katie. He later marries Florence Blakeley.
- Ben Rosenbaum as Mike Hickam (season 1–present): A resident of Hope Valley who's worked at the mercantile, Lee's sawmill, Gowen Petroleum, and the Queen of Hearts.
- Laura Bertram as Mary Dunbar-Graves (seasons 1–3): A woman who is left to care for her young son, Caleb, after her husband is killed in the mining accident. She later remarries a coal miner, Dewitt Graves in Season 2.
- Steve Bacic as Charles Spurlock (season 1): A Pinkerton agent who worked for Henry Gowen.
- Gracyn Shinyei as Emily Montgomery (season 1–present): A student of Elizabeth's and Cat's daughter
- Mitchell Kummen as Gabe Montgomery (seasons 1–2): a student of Elizabeth's who is Emily's older brother
- Mark Humphrey as Frank Hogan (seasons 2–5): Former outlaw turned pastor who puts down roots in Hope Valley.
- Max Lloyd-Jones as Tom Thornton (season 2; guest seasons 5 & 11): Jack's rebellious younger brother who enjoys flirting with Julie
- Garwin Sanford as William Thatcher (season 2; guest season 5): Elizabeth's father who does not approve of her life in Hope Valley
- Lynda Boyd as Grace Thatcher (season 2): Elizabeth's mother who falls ill
- Marcus Rosner as Charles Kensington (season 2): An old childhood friend of Elizabeth's who works for her father and has unreturned romantic feelings for her.
- Kristina Wagner as Nora Avery (seasons 2–3): Bill's former wife who became distant after her young son died.
- Ava Grace Cooper as Opal Weise: A young student of Elizabeth's. She often carries a teddy bear named Brownie with her. (seasons 3–present)
- Christian Michael Cooper as Timmy Lawson: A young aspiring musician who is a student of Elizabeth's. (seasons 3–present)
- Genea Charpentier as Laura Campbell (seasons 3–9): A young Hope Valley resident who was a student of Elizabeth's. After aging out of school in Season 6, she begins working for Elizabeth as Little Jack's nanny.
- Carter Ryan Evancic as Cody Stanton (seasons 3–6): A young orphan who was adopted by Abigail along with his older sister, Becky. He was written off the show along with Abigail due to the college scandal.
- Spencer Drever as Cyrus Rivera (season 4)
- Jeremy Guilbaut as Ray Wyatt (season 4)
- Niall Matter as Shane Cantrell (season 4): A young man who comes to Hope Valley to help build the railroad. He had a son in Elizabeth's class. He and his son leave Hope Valley because his son had an eye condition.
- Jocelyn Hudon as Grace Bennett (season 6), a young woman who opened an orphanage in nearby Brookfield with her sister, Lilian.
- Kayla Wallace as Fiona Miller (recurring seasons 6–10; guest seasons 11 & 13): Originally a Telephone operator from San Francisco. Opens up her own barbershop in Hope Valley and later leaves Hope Valley to join the Suffragettes.
- Jaeda Lily Miller as Allie Grant (season 6–present): Nathan Grant's niece. She is thrilled when her uncle legally adopts her.
- Clayton James as Kevin Townsend (seasons 5–7): The local blacksmith in town.
- Natasha Burnett as Minnie Canfield (season 8–present): Joseph's wife. She enjoys cooking and later starts working at the café.
- Amanda Wong as Mei Sou (season 9–present): Tried to outrun her ex-husband and took refuge in the town. She is later hired to work as a pharmacist and at The Yost's new business.
- Stefanie von Pfetten as Madeleine Saint John (season 10): A woman who comes to Hope Valley as a tourist along with her son Jamie.
- Samantha Ferris as Maisie Hickam (season 11): The mayor of Benson Hills and Mike Hickam's older sister.
- Billy Christos Jr. as Toby Kovalenko (season 10–present)

=== Notable guest stars ===
- James Brolin as Circuit Judge Jedidiah Black (season 1): A judge who comes to Hope Valley to prosecute Henry Gowen.
- Karin Konoval as Aunt Agatha Thatcher (seasons 2, 10): Elizabeth's aunt and her fathers sister.
- Anne Marie DeLuise as Carolyn Connors (season 3): Cody and Becky's estranged aunt
- Brooke Shields as Charlotte Thornton (season 3, 13): Jack's mother
- Josie Bissett as AJ Foster (seasons 4–5): An outlaw that Bill had run-ins with
- Cindy Busby as Marlise Bennett (season 4): Carson's former sister-in-law
- Michael Hogan as Archie Grant (season 7): Nathan's father
- Teryl Rothery as Helen Bouchard (season 8): Lucas's mother
- Melissa Gilbert as Georgie McGill (season 12–13)

== Production ==
The series, originally planned to be filmed in Colorado, was filmed in south Vancouver, British Columbia, on a farm surrounded by vineyards. The fictional frontier town of Coal Valley (later Hope Valley) was erected in late 2013. Some of the set trimmings and a stage coach came from the Hell on Wheels set. The Thatcher home is the University Women's Club of Vancouver.

The costuming of the first season closely resembles the clothes of the 1910s period for historical accuracy. The second season's appears more contemporary and departs from the previous season's. In April 2016, the series's Slovene-born costume designer Barbara Gregusova told TVInsider.com that Hallmark hired Gregusova to make the third season's costuming a mixture of that of the previous two seasons. She further said that such costuming mixture was done also to reduce timing to design the clothes and because the clothes accurately resembling those from 1910 would be more expensive to make.

Hallmark wanted me to still do 1910 but with a modern feel. I usually call it a "stylized 1910 period" because we are trying to keep some of the period silhouettes, but when it comes to the color palette, it’s definitely brighter and very Hallmark-ish because it's very colorful.

— Barbara Gregusova, TVInsider.com

Some viewers and critics criticized the costuming in subsequent seasons for less historical accuracy compared to the first season.

=== Release ===
The series began airing on the Hallmark Channel in the United States on January 11, 2014, and on Super Channel in Canada on April 16, 2014. The series was renewed for a second season, which aired from April 25 to June 13, 2015. Hallmark Channel announced in July 2015 that the series had been renewed for a third season, which aired from February 21 to April 10, 2016, with a sneak peek airing during the 2015 Christmas season. Soon in the same period, it was announced that Season 4 would premiere on the Hallmark Channel Christmas Day with a two-hour special. On April 11, 2016, Lissing and Krakow announced via the series' Facebook page that Hallmark Channel had renewed the series for a fourth season, which aired from February 19 to April 23, 2017.

On April 24, 2017, series star Erin Krakow announced via the Hallmark Channel website that the show would return for a fifth season, which premiered in February 2018 and ended in April. Filming for season five began in Vancouver on August 22, 2017, and ended on December 21, 2017. The show later aired from February to April 2018. Season six of the show began airing on February 24, 2019, however, on March 14, Hallmark announced that they had dropped Loughlin from future company projects due to her role in the 2019 college admissions bribery scandal. On April 10, 2019, it was announced that season six would resume on May 5, 2019, with Loughlin's scenes edited out.

On April 13, 2019, the series was renewed for a seventh season which aired February 23 to April 26, 2020. On April 26, 2020, Hallmark Channel announced via a video from Krakow that the series would return for an eighth season, which aired from February 21 to May 9, 2021. On May 9, 2021, Hallmark Channel announced via a video from Krakow that the series would return for a ninth season, which aired from March 6 to May 22, 2022. On June 17, 2022, the series was renewed for a tenth season. On February 22, 2023, ahead of the tenth season premiere, the series was renewed for an eleventh season which went on to premiere on April 7, 2024.

On May 10, 2024, Hallmark Channel announced, via an Entertainment Tonight exclusive, that the series would be returning for a twelfth season, with 12 all-new episodes. Production began on July 2024. On March 23, 2025, the series was renewed for another 12 episodes for a thirteenth season. On December 2, 2025, ahead of the thirteenth season premiere, the series was renewed for 12 episodes of a fourteenth season with Loughlin set to return after making a cameo in the season 13 finale.

== Broadcast ==
The first season of the series was subsequently picked up by CBC Television for rebroadcast as a summer series in 2015. The network has since aired all six seasons. The series became available internationally on Netflix in August 2017, but was taken off in early 2021. Seasons 7–9 were added to Peacock in November 2022.

== Spin-offs ==
- A spin-off of the show, When Hope Calls, was announced at Hallmark's Television Critics Association summer press tour on July 26, 2018. The series debuted on August 30, 2019, as the initial offering of the Hallmark Movies Now streaming service. The second season aired on Great American Family and the third season premiered on April 2, 2026 on Pureflix.
- A second spin-off, Hope Valley: 1874, is a prequel created for streaming service Hallmark+. This spin-off premiered March 21, 2026.

== Accolades ==
The show was awarded the Epiphany Prize for Inspiring Television at the 2019 MovieGuide Awards.
