= Lindsay Sturman =

American television writer and producer (born 1970)

- Born: Lindsay Jewett; 1970 (age 55–56); New York City, New York, U.S.
- Education: Milton Academy; Harvard University (BA); Columbia University School of the Arts (MFA)
- Occupations: Television writer, producer, showrunner, podcast host
- Years active: 2000s – present
- Known for: Showrunner of When Calls the Heart, co-executive producer of Supergirl and Teen Wolf
- Relatives: Charles W. Jewett (grandfather)

Lindsay Sturman (born 1970) is an American television writer, producer, showrunner and podcaster who has written for over a dozen television series. She is also an education and housing activist.

She served as showrunner for When Calls the Heart (2023–2025) and co-executive producer of Supergirl (2019–2021) and Teen Wolf (2016–2017).

== Early life and education ==
Sturman was born in New York City in 1970 to Nancy (Tucky) Robertson and Jonathan Jewett, the second of three children. She is the granddaughter of Charles W. Jewett, who served as Lieutenant Governor of Connecticut from 1955 to 1959 and was a former Republican majority leader of Connecticut's state Senate.

Sturman attended Milton Academy and graduated from Harvard University in 1992 with a degree in English literature. She completed a Master of Fine Arts degree at Columbia University's Film School and moved to Los Angeles to work as an editor and screenwriter.

== Career ==
=== Television writing and producing ===
Sturman began her writing career on the staff of television series, including Joan of Arcadia, Odyssey 5, and Family Law. She served as both writer and producer on Battle Creek, Cult, Rizzoli & Isles, NCIS: Los Angeles, Harper's Island, and Close to Home.

After serving as consulting producer on Teen Wolf, she became co-executive producer and co-showrunner (2016–2017). Sturman stated that "the fans get how powerful the show is. They get that the show is truly complex, and that it is doing many things at once," and "I think the fans validate that shows do not have to be one simple thing, one 'kind' of show, but can be layered and complex."

In 2022, Sturman became showrunner of When Calls the Heart, the Hallmark Channel's longest-running television series. Regarding writer Janette Oke, whose books inspired the series, Sturman stated: "I have been lucky enough to meet Janette Oke, and I think her goodness permeates everything we do, and inspires us to tell kind stories."

=== Podcast ===
Sturman is a co-host of Bike Talk, a podcast focused on cycling and urban-planning issues, broadcast on KPFK.

=== Civic activism ===
Sturman led the founding of three charter schools in Los Angeles: Larchmont Charter School, Valley Charter School, and City Language Immersion Charter School. In 2009, she received the Hart Vision California Charter School Volunteer of the Year Award.

In 2020, Sturman co-founded the Livable Communities Initiative, a 501(c)(3) nonprofit organization that promotes high-quality attainable housing for families by transforming Los Angeles's commercial corridors into walkable, bikeable 15-minute cities near job centers and public transportation.
