= When Hope Calls =

Spin-off of When Calls the Heart

- Genre: Drama; Western
- Created by: Alfonso H. Moreno
- Inspired by: When Calls the Heart
- Starring: Morgan Kohan; Jocelyn Hudon; Ryan-James Hatanaka; Greg Hovanessian; Wendy Crewson; Marshall Williams; Hanneke Talbot; Neil Crone; Lori Loughlin; Cindy Busby
- Country of origin: United States
- Original language: English
- No. of seasons: 3
- No. of episodes: 24

Production
- Executive producers: Alfonso H. Moreno; Brian Bird; Brad Krevoy; Susie Belzberg Krevoy; Michael Landon Jr.; Amanda Phillips Atkins; Jimmy Townsend; Eric Jarboe; Mike Rohl; Kathy Ceroni; Bradley Walsh; David Anselmo; Amy Krell; Cara Russell; Lorenzo Nardini
- Producers: David Anselmo; Kym Crepin
- Production locations: Powassan, Ontario, Canada
- Running time: 40–43 minutes

Original release
- Network: Hallmark Movies Now
- Release: August 30 – October 25, 2019
- Network: Great American Family
- Release: December 18, 2021 – present

Related
- When Calls the Heart

When Hope Calls (also marketed on Great American Pure Flix as When Hope Calls: Brookfield) is an American Western drama television series. The series is a spin-off of Hallmark Channel's When Calls the Heart, which is based on the Canadian West book series by Janette Oke. It premiered on August 30, 2019 as the inaugural original programming on Hallmark Movies Now, the Hallmark Channel's digital streaming service, with new episodes being released through October 25, 2019. The series was subsequently aired on Hallmark Channel in early 2020. The series was renewed for a second season and premiered on Great American Family on December 18, 2021. The continuation of season 2 premiered on Pure Flix on April 3, 2025 and on GAC Family 3 days later on April 6. Season 3 aired on GAF and Pureflix from April 1 to May 6, 2026. Shortly after the finale, the show was renewed for a fourth season, which will air in Spring 2027. Seasons 1 & 2 are also streaming on Netflix as of September 2026.

== Premise ==
The series takes place in the western Canadian town of Brookfield in the late 1910s and early 1920s, following the lives of its residents, who meet challenges while maintaining the community and caring for the children at the local orphanage. The first season followed Lillian and Grace, originally introduced in When Calls the Heart: The Greatest Christmas Blessing, as two orphaned sisters, who were separated when Lillian was seven and Grace was five. The two reunite as adults and open an orphanage in a small town. Mountie Gabriel has a romantic interest in Lillian while Chuck, a rancher turned veterinarian, is the object of Grace's flirtations, much to the dismay of his dubious mother, Tess Stewart. Lillian, Grace, Gabriel and Chuck eventually leave town, and in season 2, the focus shifts to Lillian's aunt, Nora, a lawyer who comes to town and takes the role of caretaker at the orphanage. Mountie Fletcher comes in to replace Gabriel, and begins a romance with Nora. Fashion designer Hannah returns to town to look after her late uncle's ranch, and starts a flirtation with the ranch's foreman, Wyatt.

== Cast and characters ==
=== Main ===
- Morgan Kohan as Lillian Walsh (seasons 1-2), Grace's older sister who was adopted at a young age and separated from Grace
- Jocelyn Hudon as Grace Bennett (season 1), Lillian's younger sister who grew up in an orphanage; Grace departs for London at the end of the first season, and is revealed to have stayed and married there in "A Country Christmas".
- Ryan-James Hatanaka (Note: Credited as RJ Hatanaka in season 1.) as Constable Gabriel "Gabe" Kinslow (seasons 1-2), the local Mountie in town
- Greg Hovanessian as Charlie "Chuck" Stewart (season 1), Tess' son, and a rancher and the town veterinarian; it is revealed he left town after Grace did in "A Country Christmas".
- Cindy Busby as Nora Anderson (season 2-present), a lawyer who helps at the orphanage
- Christopher Russell as Constable Michael Fletcher (season 2-present), the Mountie who replaces Constable Kinslow
- Sarah Fisher as Hannah Lawrence (season 2-present), a fashion designer who comes to town to settle her late uncle's affairs
- Nick Bateman as Wyatt Parker (season 2-present), the foreman of the Lawrence ranch
- Wendy Crewson as Tess Stewart, Chuck's mother, who owns the big local ranch
- Hanneke Talbot as Maggie Parsons (recurring season 1; main season 2-present), the town nurse
- Marshall Williams (season 1) and Jon McLaren (season 2-present) as Sam Tremblay, a prospector turned entrepreneur
- Neil Crone as Ronnie Stewart (recurring season 1; main season 2-present), Chuck's uncle and Tess's brother-in-law who runs the local hotel

=== Recurring ===
- Isaak Bailey as Christian (season 1), an orphan at the orphanage
- Michael Copeman as Ken Newsome, a unfriendly old man
- Liam MacDonald as Vincent, an older orphan at the orphanage
- Kate Moyer as Sophia (season 1), an orphan at the orphanage.
- Riley O'Donnell as Helen (season 1), an older orphan at the orphanage who is searching for her grandfather, and who goes to live with him in "Where Hope Goes".
- Kim Roberts as Pearl Mayfair (season 1), a resident of Brookfield who owns a bakery
- Elizabeth Saunders as Eleanor Winters (season 1), the orphanage's housemother
- Simon Webster as Fred (season 1), a curious young orphan at the orphanage
- Kevin McGarry as Nathan Grant (season 1) the Mountie from Hope Valley who comes to Brookfield to help Gabe.
- Trevor Donovan as Jim Reynolds (season 2-present), a Mountie based in Clearwater
- Jillian Murray as Justine Marcel
- Ava Weiss as Mary Louise, an orphan at the orphanage
- Jefferson Brown as Joe Moody, the owner of Brookfield's general store
- Kyana Teresa as Debbie Mayfair, Pearl Mayfair's daughter who runs the bakery
- Kelly Martin as Ruth, a worker at the post office
- Jonathan Potts as Ben Mendelson
- Morgan David Jones as Hank, a ranch hand on the Stewart ranch
- Kalinka Petrie as Lucie Clay, Chuck's childhood friend who may be romantically interested in him; she is later named the "foreman" at the Stewart ranch by Tess.
- Rob Stewart as Tom Clay, Lucie's father and a rancher

=== Guest stars ===
- Pascale Hutton as Rosemary "Rosie" LeVeaux Coulter, an acquaintance of Grace's from Hope Valley (in "From the Ashes")
- Kavan Smith as Leland "Lee" Coulter, another acquaintance of Grace's from Hope Valley (in "From the Ashes")
- Emily Anderson as Eve Gardiner, Grace's old friend from the orphanage who is passing through town on her way to New York City (in "About a Girl")
- Lori Loughlin as Abigail Stanton (season 2), an acquaintance of Lillian's, she is a kind woman from Hope Valley and Cody's mom (in "A Country Christmas, Parts 1 & 2")
- Carter Ryan Evancic as Cody Stanton, Abigail Stanton's son (in "A Country Christmas, Parts 1 & 2")
- Daniel Lissing as Jack Thornton, a deceased constable who was a good friend of Abigail's. She dreams about him. (in "A Country Christmas, Part 2")
- Jesse Hutch as Jerry Huntsman, a representative of L&M Cattle Company who reveals a darker side

== Episodes ==
=== Series overview ===
| Season | Episodes | Originally shown | | Provider |
| Season | Episodes | First shown | Last shown | Provider |
|---|---|---|---|---|
| 1 | 10 | August 30, 2019 | October 25, 2019 | Hallmark+ |
| 2 | 8 | December 18, 2021 | May 11, 2025 | Great American Family |
| 3 | 6 | April 5, 2026 | May 10, 2026 | Great American Family |

=== Season 1 (2019) ===
| No. overall | No. in season | Title | Directed by | Written by | Original release date |
|---|---|---|---|---|---|
| 1 | 1 | "New Hope" | Mike Rohl | Alfonso Moreno | August 30, 2019 |
Having newly set up their orphanage in Brookfield, sisters Lillian and Grace face unwelcoming neighbors, especially Tess Stewart who has unresolved issues with Lillian's family. Constable Gabriel Kinslow reacquaints himself with the sisters after returning to town and is immediately charmed by Lillian. Meanwhile, Chuck, the town's veterinarian and Tess's son, helps Grace, when the cow she purchased from his mother fails to produce milk, and is impressed by Grace's tenacity. Despite their disagreements, the town bands together when a crisis strikes during the grand opening of a new hotel and puts lives, including Lillian's, at risk. This disaster helps Lillian and Grace gain some acceptance but creates a mystery for Gabriel to solve.
| 2 | 2 | "From the Ashes" | Mike Rohl | Larry Bambrick | August 30, 2019 |
Brookfield rebuilds after a devastating fire, and visitors from Hope Valley lend a hand. Lillian and Grace welcome Rosemary and Lee Coulter, who bring lumber and support. Gabriel investigates the cause of the fire, and, when evidence points to two orphans, Lillian begins to doubt her qualifications to run an orphanage. Tess's tumultuous history with Lillian's family complicates the mutual attraction between Grace and Chuck. Having lost his store in the fire, Joe considers moving. Meanwhile, nurse Maggie Parsons arrives in town, and Tess continues to feud with one of her neighbors over missing livestock.
| 3 | 3 | "Out of the Past" | Bradley Walsh | Derek Thompson | September 6, 2019 |
New evidence points Gabriel toward a suspect in the town fire, leading him to hunt for a fugitive. Grace takes a second job to make money for the orphanage, hoping to use the funds to help make the lives of the children in her care better than hers was growing up. Lillian tries to mend fences with Tess. Maggie settles into her job at the infirmary.
| 4 | 4 | "Lost and Found" | Bradley Walsh | Sara Snow | September 13, 2019 |
Lillian searches for an orphan's family member and hopes for the same success she had when she found Grace. She journeys to Mountie headquarters with Gabriel, and, while she searches through records, he meets with the bank robber who tried to kill him. Despite having no impact on his jail sentence, the bank robber claims that he is accused of stealing more money than he actually stole. Back in Brookfield, Grace and Chuck grow closer, but Tess orchestrates a scenario to extinguish their romantic spark. Maggie tries to help Joe with an old shoulder injury and soon realizes that guilt about the accident that caused it may be preventing him from trying to heal.
| 5 | 5 | "A House United" | Don McBrearty | David Barlow | September 20, 2019 |
When a government worker comes to inspect the orphanage, Lillian and Grace attempt to measure up. Although they use creativity and community to address issues at the orphanage, the true test arises when the inspector questions events from Grace's past. Gabriel and Chuck help repair the orphanage's roof and work alongside Sam, a struggling prospector offering handyman services in exchange for room and board. Gabriel seems to be jealous over Sam's closeness to Lillian, while Chuck hopes to restore his blossoming relationship with Grace. Meanwhile, Tess puts her endeavor to buy a truck on hold when Ronnie needs her help.
| 6 | 6 | "The Search" | Don McBrearty | Sara Snow & Larry Bambrick | September 27, 2019 |
When a train robber is spotted near Brookfield, Lillian and Grace attempt to keep their orphans safe. Despite her initial instinct to trust Sam, Lillian second-guesses herself when the description of the train robber – and the caution of Gabriel Kinslow – casts doubts on his character. Gabriel helps Constable Nathan Grant, in town from Hope Valley, in hunting down the fugitive. Chuck stays at the orphanage as a protective measure and to spend more time with Grace. Tess interviews candidates for a new foreman but hopes that Chuck will eventually decide to run the family ranch. Meanwhile, Maggie makes an interesting discovery at the infirmary.
| 7 | 7 | "Surprise" | T. W. Peacocke | David Barlow & Sara Snow | October 4, 2019 |
Hoping to replace Grace's painful birthday memories with happy new ones, Lillian rallies the orphans and friends from town to plan a party, but Grace does extra work at the restaurant on the night of the party. Meanwhile, Chuck takes Fred, one of the orphans, under his wing at the ranch, and Tess softens her steely demeanor when she sees the joy Fred experiences around the animals. Setting off on another possibly dangerous mission, Gabriel pursues a witness to the bank robbery who claims that powerful people used the robbery to cover up fraud. Sam and Lillian spend time together preparing a special birthday gift for Grace, during Gabriel's absence, and arouses his jealousy when he returns.
| 8 | 8 | "About a Girl" | T. W. Peacocke | Alfonso Moreno | October 11, 2019 |
Though Lillian locates Helen's grandfather, Helen struggles to remember the facts about her past that she needs to know in order to prove her identity. Determined to see the reunion through, Lillian turns to Sam and her friends in town for support. A friend from Grace's past encourages her to follow her dream of moving to New York, while Chuck urges her to stay. Gabriel's investigation into the suspected bank fraud raises questions about how Ronnie funded his hotel, and Tess tries to protect Ronnie when his less-than-legal hotel funding gets him in trouble with debtors. Meanwhile, Maggie helps a visitor of Brookfield searching for healthy living.
| 9 | 9 | "House in Order" | Megan Follows | David Barlow & Larry Bambrick | October 18, 2019 |
A reporter comes to Brookfield to do a story on Tess' late husband; Gabriel's investigation hits close to home; Chuck and Grace face an impasse in their relationship.
| 10 | 10 | "Where Hope Goes" | Megan Follows | Alfonso Moreno & Sara Snow | October 25, 2019 |
Lillian and Grace make a difficult choice in order to do what's best for one of their orphans; Gabriel hopes to get his man before Lillian, or anyone else, gets hurt; Chuck realizes that it is time to share his true feelings. Gabriel and Nathan keep their eye on their suspects. Gabriel feels they may go after Lillian, so he reluctantly asks for Sam's help to protect her. Grace prepares to accompany Helen to England to be reunited with her grandfather; she worries about leaving town and Chuck while they are in the midst of an argument. Unaware of her travel plans, Chuck accompanies Lucie on a cattle drive for his mother.

=== Season 2 (2021–25) ===
| No. overall | No. in season | Title | Directed by | Written by | Original showing | USA viewers |
|---|---|---|---|---|---|---|
| 11 | 1 | "A Country Christmas, Part 1" "When Hope Calls Christmas, Part 1" | Bradley Walsh | Alfonso H. Moreno | December 18, 2021 | N/A |
The town celebrates Christmas as a reporter for Harper's Bazaar comes to town. Abigail and Cody Stanton pay a visit to Lillian and spend Christmas at the Orphanage.
| 12 | 2 | "A Country Christmas, Part 2" "When Hope Calls Christmas, Part 2" | Bradley Walsh | Alfonso H. Moreno | December 18, 2021 | N/A |
The town continues to celebrate Christmas while Abigail has a dream about an old friend who died.
| 13 | 3 | "A New Beginning" | Don McBrearty | Alfonso H. Moreno | April 6, 2025 | 256,000 |
Nora, a lawyer, arrives in Brookfield with family ties. The town welcomes her and new Mountie Fletcher. Sam returns and meets Maggie's visiting parents.
| 14 | 4 | "So Long, Not Goodbye" | Don McBrearty | Alfonso H. Moreno | April 13, 2025 | 179,000 |
The town says a farewell; Nora and Charlotte look for Tess' lost foal; Ronnie conspires to honor Mountie Fletcher for his bravery; Sam reveals a secret to Maggie.
| 15 | 5 | "Finding Our Way" | Megan Follows | Alfonso H. Moreno | April 20, 2025 | 203,000 |
Hannah Lawrence returns to town with plans on selling her father's ranch, and has a hard time adjusting to the small town's ways. Tess has interest in buying the ranch, and tries to get Wyatt (the ranch manager) to help her get it. Mounty Fletcher and Nora take a trip together to bring back an orphan in need. Sam tries to work at the ranch, bur discovers he is allergic to Hay.
| 16 | 6 | "The Truth Shall Set You Free" | Megan Follows | Alfonso H. Moreno | April 27, 2025 | 226,000 |
Hannah tries to auction the ranch off, but pulls back on the deal to prevent it falling in to corporate hands. FLetcher and Nora investigate and discover that the new orphan Jenny is really an 18 year old named Delores who posed at 15 to stay at the orphanage when her ability to get a job failed.
| 17 | 7 | "Bringing to Light" | Don McCutcheon | Sara Snow | May 4, 2025 | 194,000 |
Several of the children pretend illness to get away from a newly hired Miss Ainsworth, and go to Maggie's to "Recover. Nora and FLetcher gain a dog when they find him at a criminal's cabin. Sam learns he has inherited a gold mine. cattle seemto be disappearing.
| 18 | 8 | "Season of Change" | Don McCutcheon | Kirsten Hansen | May 11, 2025 | 202,000 |
With Mountie Fletcher's help, ranchers try to catch rustlers terrorizing their land. Ronnie plans a party for Sam after word spreads of his gold find.

=== Season 3 (2026) ===
| No. overall | No. in season | Title | Directed by | Written by | Original showing |
|---|---|---|---|---|---|
| 19 | 1 | "Gratitude" | Don McCutcheon | Alfonso H. Moreno | April 5, 2026 |
The Mounties track a dangerous criminal. Nora helps a child find a valuable stone.
| 20 | 2 | "Dreams" | Don McCutcheon | Kirsten Hansen & Sara Snow | April 12, 2026 |
Nora's relationship is tested, Sam weighs his options and Wyatt and Lucia draw closer.
| 21 | 3 | "Justice" | Melanie Orr | Alfonso H. Moreno | April 19, 2026 |
The new Reverend assists Nora with teaching baseball to the children. Reynolds develops feelings for Justine while Debbie's business venture creates problems for Sam and Ronnie.
| 22 | 4 | "Curveball" | Melanie Orr | Kirsten Hansen & Sara Snow | April 26, 2026 |
Reynolds interrogates Justine about her stolen ring as the robbery probe escalates.
| 23 | 5 | "Salvation" | Jerry Ciccoritti | Kirsten Hansen & Sara Snow & Miriam Van Emst | May 3, 2026 |
Fletcher and Nora's first date, Sam's new lifestyle worries Maggie, Hannah faces a setback, and Wyatt and Tess question a new buyer in town.
| 24 | 6 | "Passages" | Jerry Ciccoritti | Kirsten Hansen & Sara Snow | May 10, 2026 |
Nora and Fletcher's bond strengthens. Brookfield's women unite. Tess makes a drastic choice. Sam and Maggie hit a critical moment. Reverend Daniels speaks to the town.

== Production ==
When Hope Calls is a spin-off of the long running prime time series When Calls the Heart. Primary filming is at Powassan, Ontario, Canada. It is executive produced by Alfonso Moreno, Brian Bird, Brad Krevoy, Susie Belzberg Krevoy, Michael Landon Jr., Amanda Phillips Atkins, Jimmy Townsend, and Eric Jarboe. Confirmation of the project, the Hallmark Network's inaugural streaming series, was announced February 9, 2019 as part of Crown Media Family Networks' bi-annual Television Critics Association Winter Press Tour.

On September 29, 2021, it was reported that the series had renewed for a second season, but would now be broadcast on Great American Family. It was also reported that When Calls the Heart actress Lori Loughlin would appear in the second season premiere, in her first television acting appearance since her arrest for her role in the Varsity Blues scandal.

== Release ==
When Hope Calls premiered in back-to-back double episodes on August 30, 2019 on the Hallmark Movies Now network digital streaming service. The first season was re-broadcast on Hallmark Channel starting in February 2020. A second season premiered on December 18, 2021, and moved to GAC Family from Hallmark, and continued in 2025. Season 3 aired in 2026, and was renewed for a fourth season shortly after, which will air in Spring 2027.

Netflix started streaming seasons 1 & 2 of the show in September 2026.
