= Hallmark+ =

On-demand streaming video service

- Formerly: SpiritClips (2007–14); Feeln (2014–17); Hallmark Movies Now (2017–24)
- Type: Subsidiary
- Industry: Subscription video on demand
- Founded: 2007; 19 years ago
- Headquarters: Los Angeles, California, U.S.
- Key people: Robert N. Fried, founder
- Services: Streaming media subscription service
- Parent: Hallmark Media
- Website: www.hallmarkplus.com

Hallmark+ is subscription video on-demand service owned by Hallmark Media. It primarily carries family-friendly movies, documentaries and short films, including Hallmark Hall of Fame movies and original content tied to Hallmark's cable networks.

The company was originally founded in 2007 by Robert N. Fried as SpiritClips, and was acquired by Hallmark Cards in 2012; it was then renamed Feeln in 2014, and then Hallmark Movies Now in 2017. It was relaunched again in September 2024 as Hallmark+, introducing a new slate of original series, as well as loyalty benefits for Hallmark Cards stores.

== History ==
Hallmark Movies Now was founded in 2007 as SpiritClips. The company was started by Robert N. Fried, a film producer and studio executive who has produced movies such as Rudy and Hoosiers. Fried created SpiritClips as a collection of family-friendly and inspirational films; some of its films were edited for content. The service also allowed users to create personalized e-cards with provided photos and videos.

In April 2012, SpiritClips was acquired by Hallmark Cards. SpiritClips already had an existing agreement with Hallmark for it to be the exclusive streaming home of the Hallmark Hall of Fame film franchise. Despite sharing common ownership, SpiritClips operated as an independent subsidiary, and remained separate from Hallmark's broadcasting division Crown Media—owner of Hallmark Channel. In November of that year, Crown tentatively announced plans for its own streaming service, Hallmark Instant Streaming, which would be dedicated to the library of original movies and series produced for Hallmark Channel and its sister networks.

In September 2014, SpiritClips was rebranded as Feeln (pronounced "feelin'"); Fried stated that the previous moniker gave the false impression that the service focused only on short-form content, rather than full-length feature films.

In July 2017, Crown Media announced that Feeln would be relaunched as Hallmark Movies Now in October 2017, with existing subscribers migrated to the service. In November 2017, the service became available on Amazon Prime Video Channels.

In July 2024, Hallmark announced that Hallmark Movies Now would be relaunched as Hallmark+ in September 2024. The relaunched service would feature a larger slate of original programming, as well as various benefits tied to Hallmark's retail operations—including coupons for one free greeting card per-month, a $5 coupon per-month, additional Crown Rewards points, and annual gifts. The service initially co-existed with Hallmark's streaming agreement with NBCUniversal's Peacock; that agreement expired at the end of April 2025.

== Content ==
As Hallmark Movies Now, the service primarily focused on library content such as family-friendly films and past Hallmark Channel original movies, and did not focus as aggressively on original content in comparison to other streaming services as to protect Hallmark's linear cable networks. Crown Media CEO Bill Abbott stated that duplicating content between multiple services "hurts the ecosystem and drives consumers to SVOD". In August 2019, Hallmark Movies Now premiered its first original series, When Hope Calls—a spin-off of the Hallmark Channel series When Calls the Heart.

The service's content strategy changed with the relaunch as Hallmark+, with a larger slate of original movies, miniseries, and non-scripted programs planned for the service—including the Christmas miniseries Holidazed, movie series Groomsmen, the Ashley Williams-hosted "romantic comedy" dating show Small Town Setup, the Luke Macfarlane-hosted home renovation series Home is Where the Heart Is, and the reality talent search Finding Mr. Christmas.

The third season of The Way Home was originally scheduled to premiere exclusively on Hallmark+ in January 2025, with a linear television premiere on Hallmark Channel later in 2025. Following criticism by viewers, Hallmark Media scrapped the plan and announced that new episodes would instead premiere on Hallmark Channel in January 2025, and become available the next day on Hallmark+.

== See also ==
- List of Hallmark Channel Original Movies
- List of Hallmark Hall of Fame episodes
