= 31st Young Artist Awards =

2010 US media awards ceremony

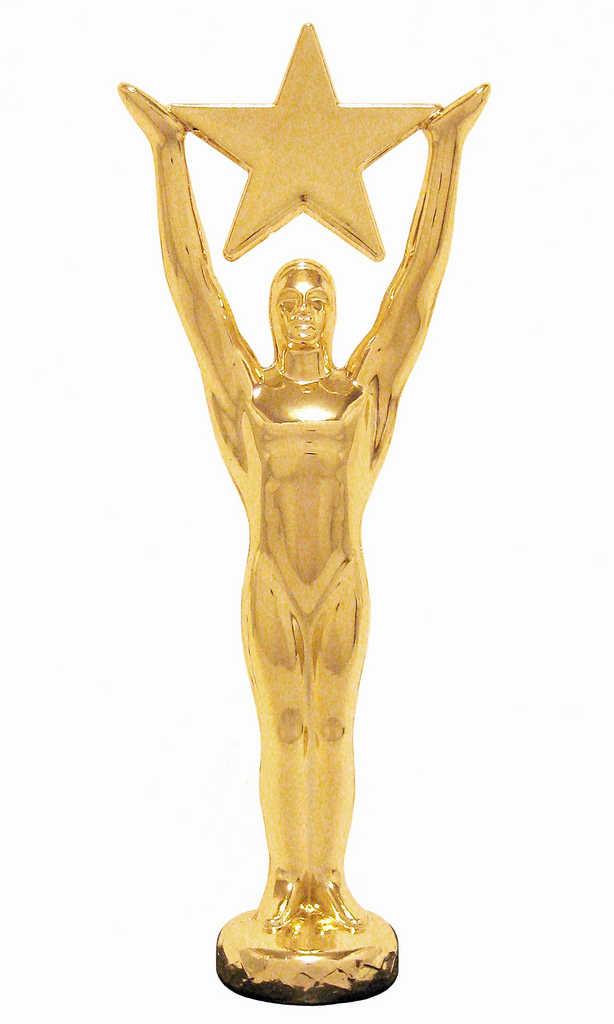
- Awarded for: Achievement in 2009 in film and television
- Date: April 11, 2010
- Site: Beverly Garland Hotel; Studio City, Los Angeles, California
- Hosted by: Jake T. Austin

The 31st Young Artist Awards ceremony, presented by the Young Artist Association, honored excellence of young performers under the age of 21 in the fields of film, television, theatre and music for the year 2009, and took place on April 11, 2010 at the Beverly Garland Holiday Inn Hotel in North Hollywood, California.

Established in 1978 by long-standing Hollywood Foreign Press Association member Maureen Dragone, the Young Artist Association was the first organization to establish an awards ceremony specifically set to recognize and award the contributions of performers under the age of 21 in the fields of film, television, theater and music.

== Categories ==
★ Bold indicates the winner in each category.

== Best Performance in a Feature Film ==
=== Best Performance in a Feature Film - Leading Young Actor ===
★ Max Records - Where The Wild Things Are - Warner Brothers

- Jake T. Austin - Hotel for Dogs - DreamWorks Paramount
- Jimmy Bennett - Alabama Moon - Alabama Moon Entertainment
- Taylor Lautner - The Twilight Saga: New Moon - Imprint Entertainment
- Devon Bostick - Adoration - Ego Film Arts

=== Best Performance in a Feature Film - Leading Young Actress ===
★ Abigail Breslin - My Sister's Keeper - New Line Cinema

- Emma Roberts - Hotel for Dogs - DreamWorks Paramount
- Jolie Vanier - Shorts - Warner Brothers
- Yara Shahidi - Imagine That - Paramount
- Saoirse Ronan - The Lovely Bones - DreamWorks

=== Best Performance in a Feature Film - Supporting Young Actor ===
★ Ty Wood - The Haunting in Connecticut - Lionsgate

- Brennan Bailey - My Sister's Keeper - New Line Cinema
- Alex Ferris - The Time Traveler's Wife - Warner Brothers
- Brandon Soo Hoo - G.I. Joe: The Rise of Cobra - Paramount
- William Cuddy - Amelia - Fox Searchlight
- Chandler Canterbury - Knowing - Summit Entertainment
- Jake Cherry - Night at the Museum: Battle of the Smithsonian - Twentieth Century Fox
- Jae Head - The Blind Side - Warner Brothers
- Chase Ellison - Fireflies in the Garden - Kulture Machine
- Jason Spevack - Sunshine Cleaning - Overture

=== Best Performance in a Feature Film - Supporting Young Actress ===
★ (tie) Sofia Vassilieva - My Sister's Keeper - New Line Cinema
★ (tie) Jessica Carlson - Cirque du Freak: The Vampire's Assistant - Universal

- Chloë Grace Moretz - (500) Days of Summer - Fox Searchlight
- Evanna Lynch - Harry Potter and the Half-Blood Prince - Warner Brothers
- Raini Rodriguez - Paul Blart: Mall Cop - Sony
- Kiernan Shipka - Carriers - Paramount Vantage

=== Best Performance in a Feature Film - Young Ensemble Cast ===
★ Shorts - Warner Brothers

Jimmy Bennett, Jake Short, Devon Gearhart, Leo Howard, Jolie Vanier and Trevor Gagnon

- Aliens in the Attic - 20th Century Fox

Megan Parker, Henri Young, Regan Young, Austin Robert Butler and Carter Jenkins

== Best Performance in an International Feature Film ==
=== Best Performance in an International Feature Film - Leading Young Performers ===
★ Leonard Proxauf & Leonie Benesch (Germany) - The White Ribbon - Sony Pictures Classics

- Denis Sukhomlinov (Russia) - Shenok (Puppy) - Universe
- Nick Romeo Reimann (Germany) - The Crocodiles - Constantin Film
- Tom Russell (Australia) - Last Ride - Madman Entertainment
- Fouad Habash & Ibrahim Frege (Israel) - Ajami - Kino International

== Best Performance in a Short Film ==
=== Best Performance in a Short Film - Young Actor ===
★ Joey Luthman - Save the Skeet

- Ricardo Hoyos - The Armoire
- Christopher Casa - The Catharsis of Foster Pensky
- Tristan Price - Liberty Lane
- Jack Weatherbe - Trolls
- Michael William Arnold - Weird Al's Big Brain
- Dawson Dunbar - Trolls
- Joseph Castanon - Santa's Little Helper
- Nathan Coenen - Tinglewood
- Ryan Grantham - The Anachronism
- Brandon Tyler Russell - The Exemption of Hunter Riley
- Andy Scott Harris - Amory Blaine, Son of Beatrice

=== Best Performance in a Short Film - Young Actress ===
★ Madison Leisle - City of Lights

- Caitlin EJ Meyer - I Love You Bernie Summersby
- Megan McKinnon - The Tricks
- Victoria Moroles - Innocent Eyes
- Jolie Vanier - Strange Little Girl
- Kiernan Shipka - Squeaky Clean
- Sierra Pitkin - Trolls
- Savannah McReynolds - The Christmas Valentine

== Best Performance in a TV Movie, Miniseries or Special ==
=== Best Performance in a TV Movie, Miniseries or Special - Leading Young Actor ===
★ Joey Pollari - Skyrunners - Disney XD

- Cainan Wiebe - Beyond Sherwood Forest - Syfy Channel
- Brendan Meyer - Christmas in Canaan - Hallmark Channel
- Jaishon Fisher - Gifted Hands: The Ben Carson Story - TNT
- Jason Dolley - Hatching Pete - Disney Channel

=== Best Performance in a TV Movie, Miniseries or Special - Leading or Supporting Young Actress ===
★ Tori Barban - The Christmas Hope - Lifetime

- Selena Gomez - Princess Protection Program - Disney Channel
- Patricia Raven - Dear Harvard - New York TV Festival
- Demi Lovato - Princess Protection Program - Disney Channel

=== Best Performance in a TV Movie, Miniseries or Special - Supporting Young Actor ===
★ Alex Ferris - Living Out Loud - Hallmark Channel

- Gig Morton - Angel and the Badman - Hallmark Channel
- Dante Brown - America - Lifetime
- Patrick Casa - Amazing Stories: The Michael Jackson Story - Nippon TV Corporation
- Matthew Knight - The Good Witch's Garden - Hallmark Channel

== Best Performance in a TV Series ==
=== Best Performance in a TV Series (Comedy or Drama) - Leading Young Actor ===
★ Calum Worthy - Stormworld - Space

- Jamie Johnston - Degrassi: The Next Generation - CTV
- Andrew Jenkins - Stormworld - Space
- Jake T. Austin - Wizards of Waverly Place - Disney Channel
- Austin Robert Butler - Ruby & The Rockits - ABC Family
- Nat Wolff - The Naked Brothers Band - Nickelodeon

=== Best Performance in a TV Series (Comedy or Drama) - Leading Young Actress ===
★ Ryan Newman - Zeke and Luther - Disney XD

- Valentina Barron - Stormworld - Space
- Cassandra Sawtell - Harper's Island - CBS
- Miley Cyrus - Hannah Montana - Disney Channel
- Miranda Cosgrove - iCarly - Nickelodeon

=== Best Performance in a TV Series (Comedy or Drama) - Supporting Young Actor ===
★ Ryan Malgarini - Gary Unmarried - CBS

- Nathan Kress - iCarly - Nickelodeon
- Kurt Doss - Ruby & The Rockits - ABC Family
- Skyler Gisondo - The Bill Engvall Show - TBS
- Vinicius Ricci - 9MM Sao Paulo - MundoFox
- Trevor Gagnon - The New Adventures of Old Christine - CBS

=== Best Performance in a TV Series (Comedy or Drama) - Supporting Young Actress ===
★ Kathryn Newton - Gary Unmarried - CBS

- Joey King - Anatopmy of Hope - HBO
- Allisyn Ashley Arm - Sonny with a Chance - Disney Channel
- Meaghan Jette Martin - 10 Things I Hate About You - ABC Family
- Aislinn Paul - Degrassi: The Next Generation - CTV

=== Best Performance in a TV Series - Guest Starring Young Actor 14 and Over ===
★ Nate Hartley - Hannah Montana - Disney Channel

- Calum Worthy - Flashpoint - CTV
- Hunter Gomez - Ghost Whisperer - CBS
- Colby Paul - The Mentalist - CBS
- Jack Knight - Heartland - CBS
- Jahmil French - Flashpoint - CTV
- Brendan Meyer - The Assistants - The N
- Nick Nervies - Monk - USA

=== Best Performance in a TV Series - Guest Starring Young Actor 13 and Under ===
★ Billy Unger - Mental - FOX

- Austin MacDonald - Rick Mercer Report - CBS
- Cainan Wiebe - Supernatural - CW
- David Gore - Lie to Me - FOX
- Sterling Beaumon - The Cleaner - A&E
- Joey Luthman - iCarly - Nickelodeon
- Aaron Refvem - Sons of Anarchy - FX Productions
- Andy Scott Harris - House M.D - FOX
- Scotty Noyd Jr. - CSI: Miami - CBS
- Benjamin Stockham - Criminal Minds - CBS
- Ryan Casa - The Colony - Discovery Channel

=== Best Performance in a TV Series - Guest Starring Young Actress ===
★ Emily Evan Rae - Private Practice - ABC

- Erin Sanders - Mad Men - AMC
- Danielle Chuchran - ER - NBC
- Stefanie Scott - The New Adventures of Old Christine - CBS
- Jordan Van Vranken - Criminal Minds - CBS
- Savannah Lathem - Lost - ABC
- Dalila Bela - Supernatural - CW
- Mary Charles Jones - Grey's Anatomy - ABC
- Bella Thorne - Mental - FOX
- Laytrel McMullen - Degrassi: The Next Generation - CTV

=== Best Performance in a TV Series - Recurring Young Actor 14 and Over ===
★ Mick Hazen - As the World Turns - CBS

- Devon Bostick - Being Erica - CBC
- Nate Hartley - Zeke and Luther - Disney XD
- A.J. Saudin - Degrassi: The Next Generation - CTV
- J Brock Ciarlelli - The Middle - ABC
- Daniel J. Gordon - Da Kink in My Hair - Global TV
- Eli Goree - Soul - Vision TV

=== Best Performance in a TV Series - Recurring Young Actor 13 and Under ===
★ Colin Ford - Supernatural - CW

- Austin Williams - One Life to Live - ABC
- Aaron Refvem - General Hospital - ABC
- Alex Cardillo - Durham County - ION
- Connor Stanhope - Smallville - CW
- Preston Bailey - Dexter - Showtime
- Riley Thomas Stewart - 90210 - CW
- Sterling Beaumon - Lost - ABC

=== Best Performance in a TV Series - Recurring Young Actress ===
★ Haley Pullos - General Hospital - ABC

- Christina Robinson - Dexter - Showtime
- Madison Leisle - Ghost Whisperer - CBS
- Eden Sher - The Middle - ABC
- Makenzie Vega - The Good Wife - CBS

=== Outstanding Young Ensemble Performers in a TV Series ===
★ Modern Family - ABC

Rico Rodriguez II, Nolan Gould and Ariel Winter

- iCarly - Nickelodeon

Miranda Cosgrove, Nathan Kress, Jennette McCurdy and Noah Munck

- Stormworld - Space

Calum Worthy, Andrew Jenkins and Valentina Barron

== Best Performance in a Voice-Over Role ==
=== Best Performance in a Voice-Over Role - Young Actor/Actress ===
★ Jordan Nagai - Up - Walt Disney Pictures

- Freddie Highmore - Astro Boy - Summit Entertainment
- Cainan Wiebe - Dinosaur Train - PBS
- Shemar Charles - Wibbly Pig - CBBC
- Dakota Fanning - Coraline - Focus Features
- Joey King - Ice Age: Dawn of the Dinosaurs - Blue Sky Studios/20th Century Fox

== Best Performance in a DVD Film ==
=== Best Performance in a DVD Film - Young Actor/Actress ===
★ Matthew Knight - Gooby - ConeyBeare Stories

- Danielle Chuchran - The Wild Stallion - Fill More Entertainment
- Kelsey Edwards - Minor Details - MainStay Productions
- Caitlin EJ Meyer - Minor Details - MainStay Productions
- Connor Christopher Levins - Trick 'r Treat - Warner Bros. Pictures
- Andrew Cottrill - Minor Details - MainStay Productions
- Gig Morton - Santa Buddies - Walt Disney Home Entertainment

== Best Performance in Live Theater ==
=== Best Performance in Live Theater - Young Actor/Actress ===
★ Sterling Beaumon - Big: The Musical - El Centro Theater, Hollywood

- Jolie Vanier - Oliver! - Red Carpet Theater Company, N. Hollywood
- Alex Scolari - Big: The Musical - El Centro Theater, Hollywood
- Major Curda - The Little Mermaid - Lunt-Fontanne Theater, New York
- Lauren Delfs - Blackbird - Victory Gardens Theater, Chicago
- Kayley Stallings - Dr. Seuss' How the Grinch Stole Christmas! The Musical - Panatges Theater, Hollywood

== Special awards ==
=== Outstanding Young International Vocalist ===
★ Yatharth (यथार्थ), Varanasi, India – Finalist on Sa Re Ga Ma Pa L'il Champs – Zee TV

=== Outstanding Young International Instrumentalist ===
★ Sungha Jung (정성하), Chungju, South Korea – Acoustic Finger-Style Guitarist

=== Jackie Coogan Award ===
==== Contribution to Youth Through Entertainment ====
★ The Beach Boys – Fifty Years of Outstanding Music

=== Michael Landon Award ===
==== For Humanitarian Service ====
★ George Clooney, Actor / Humanitarian – Co-founder: Not On Our Watch Project

=== Former Child Star - Life Achievement Award ===
★ Kathy Garver – "Cissy" in the CBS TV series Family Affair

=== Social Relations of Knowledge Institute Award ===
★ The Universe – The History Channel

=== Outstanding Contribution to Family Entertainment ===
★ Minor Details – Best Family Film
★ Where the Wild Things Are
★ The 101 Dalmatians Musical
★ Up
