= Kelsey Sanders =

American actress and singer

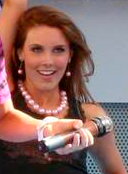
- Sanders performing as part of The Stunners in 2009

Background information
- Occupations: Actress; singer
- Years active: 2007–present
- Formerly of: The Stunners

Kelsey Sanders is an American actress and singer. She is best known for the role of Reed Brennan in the web series Private. She was a member of the pop group The Stunners from 2007 to 2009.

== Career ==
In 2009, she starred as Reed Brennan in the teen-oriented webisode series called Private based on the books of the same name by Kate Brian. Her television work includes playing Cheryl in Just Jordan and Wannabe #2, a recurring character in Wizards of Waverly Place.

== Filmography ==
=== Film ===
Year	Title	Role	Notes
2007	Color Me Olsen	Mary-Kate Olsen	
2008	Gingerdead Man 2: Passion of the Crust	Heather	
2008	Wild Child	Skye	Uncredited role
2008	Shelter	Julie Seaver	
2010	The Genesis Code	Kerry Wells	
2010	Cutback	Emily Dawson	
2011	The Soccer Nanny	Katie	
2013	Online	Mary	
2014	Grace of God	Tamara	
2014	A Matter of Time	Miranda Joelsey	
2014	Rumors of Wars	Claire	
2015	Oh Gallow Lay	—N/a	Short film
2016	Forgiven	Officer Martin	
2017	Let There Be Light	Reporter #3	

=== Television ===
Year	Title	Role	Notes
2007	Just Jordan	Cheryl	2 episodes
2007	CSI: Crime Scene Investigation	Jane Doe (1975)	Episode: "Sweet Jane"
2007–2008	Wizards of Waverly Place	Wannabe #2	3 episodes
2009	Mad Men	Ann-Margret type	Episode: "The Arrangements"
2013	Nashville	Redhead	Episode: "Take These Chains from My Heart"
2014	10,000 Days	Kovita Hesse	Television film
2018	The Resident	Woman #3	Episode: "The Elopement"

=== Web ===
Year	Title	Role	Notes
2009	Private	Reed Brennan	20 episodes
2009	Private: The Casting Call	Herself / Host	6 episodes
2010	10,000 Days	Kovita Hesse	11 episodes
2010	Hollywood Is Like High School with Money	Taylor Henning	10 episodes
