= The Genesis Code =

- Directed by: C. Thomas Howell; Patrick Read Johnson
- Written by: Michael W. Leighton
- Produced by: Michael Shane Leighton; Michael W. Leighton
- Starring: Logan Bartholomew; Kelsey Sanders; Ernest Borgnine
- Cinematography: Kees Van Oostrum
- Edited by: Edward R. Abroms
- Music by: Bill Wandel
- Production companies: Genesis Productions; CK Pictures
- Distributed by: America Saga Releasing
- Release date: August 25, 2010
- Country: United States
- Language: English
- Budget: $5 million

The Genesis Code is a 2010 Christian American drama film directed by C. Thomas Howell and Patrick Read Johnson, and written by Michael W. Leighton.

== Plot ==
Kerry Wells (Kelsey Sanders), a college student journalist and committed Christian, has been assigned to do a story on Blake Truman (Logan Bartholomew), the college's hockey superstar. Blake struggles with personal crisis but rejects Kerry's reliance on her faith. He is convinced that modern science has disproved the Bible and especially the Genesis story of creation. Together they discover that the creation story and science may be in perfect accord.

The Genesis Code takes on two current social and cultural issues: Evolution vs. creation and end-of-life decisions. Although this becomes a romance story, it gives a look to the age-old question of how science and a book of the Bible, Genesis, may both be correct and told in a format that a normal layperson will understand.

== Cast ==
- Logan Bartholomew as Blake Truman
- Kelsey Sanders as Kerry Wells
- Jerry Zandstra as Reverend Wells
- C.R. Lewis as Shane Thomas
- Ernest Borgnine as Carl Taylor
- Louise Fletcher as Ellen Taylor
- Fred Dalton Thompson as Judge Hardin
- Lance Henriksen as Dr. Hoffer
- Rance Howard as Dr. Tolley
- Ben Murphy as Professor Campbell
- Catherine Hicks as Myra Allitt
- Susan Blakely as Beverly Truman
- Rich Franklin as Coach Edwards
- Adam Chambers as Marc Wells
- Lauren Mae Shafer as Rita

== Production ==
The first director, Patrick Read Johnson, was fired and C. Thomas Howell was brought in to finish the film. Director Guild of America rules required that Johnson be given a shared credit. The film was shot in Grand Rapids, Michigan and Lowell, Michigan.

== Release ==
The Genesis Code premiered in the United States on 25 August 2010 as part of the Grand Rapids Film Festival.

The film was released on home video on 6 March 2012 in North America.
