= The Stunners =

American pop group

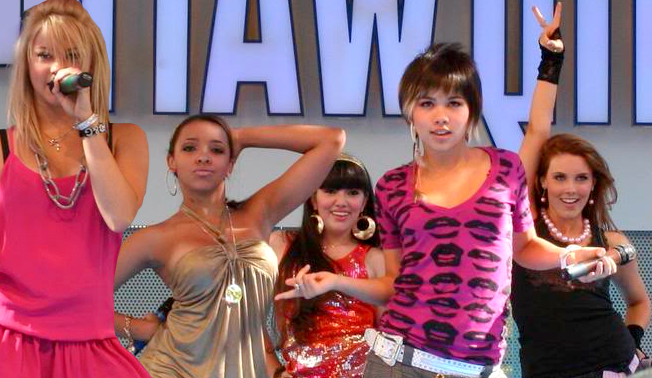
- The Stunners in 2009 (L–R: Allie Gonino, Tinashe, Marisol Esparza, Hayley Kiyoko, and Kelsey Sanders)

Background information
- Origin: U.S.
- Genres: Pop; dance-pop; electroclash; R&B
- Years active: 2007–2011
- Labels: Columbia; Universal Republic
- Past members: Allie Gonino; Hayley Kiyoko; Kelsey Sanders; Lauren Hudson; Marisol Esparza; Tinashe

The Stunners were an American girl group formed in Los Angeles in 2007. Originally the members were Allie Gonino, Hayley Kiyoko, Marisol Esparza, Kelsey Sanders, and Tinashe. In July 2009 after the debut single "Bubblegum", Sanders left the group and was replaced by Lauren Hudson. The group disbanded in 2011.

== Career ==
=== 2007–2009: Beginning and Sanders departure ===
In 2007, Allie Gonino, Hayley Kiyoko, Kelsey Sanders, Marisol Esparza, and Tinashe formed the group, after record producer Vitamin C brought the group together. Six months later, the group signed with Columbia Records and contributed a song to the iCarly soundtrack. The debut single wasn't released and, in 2009, the group left Columbia and signed a production deal with Lionsgate Entertainment, who also produced a scripted television show pilot based on the group, which was ordered by MTV. On March 18, 2009, they released a single titled "Bubblegum" to iTunes along with the official video for the single. In July 2009, Sanders left the group to pursue her acting career and was substituted by Lauren Hudson.

=== 2009–2011: The Stunners, My World Tour and split ===
On September 29, 2009, the girls released a 5-song EP influenced by Madonna, Gwen Stefani, and Rihanna. They released a holiday single in December 2009, produced by Desmond Child, and written by the five members of the group, titled "Santa Bring My Soldier Home" and encouraged donations the USO for soldiers overseas, not with their families for the holidays. The group performed the song on The Today Show as well as The Wendy Williams Show. On December 13, 2009, they appeared on Anything Anything with Rich Russo where they performed an a cappella version of "Santa Bring My Soldier Home".

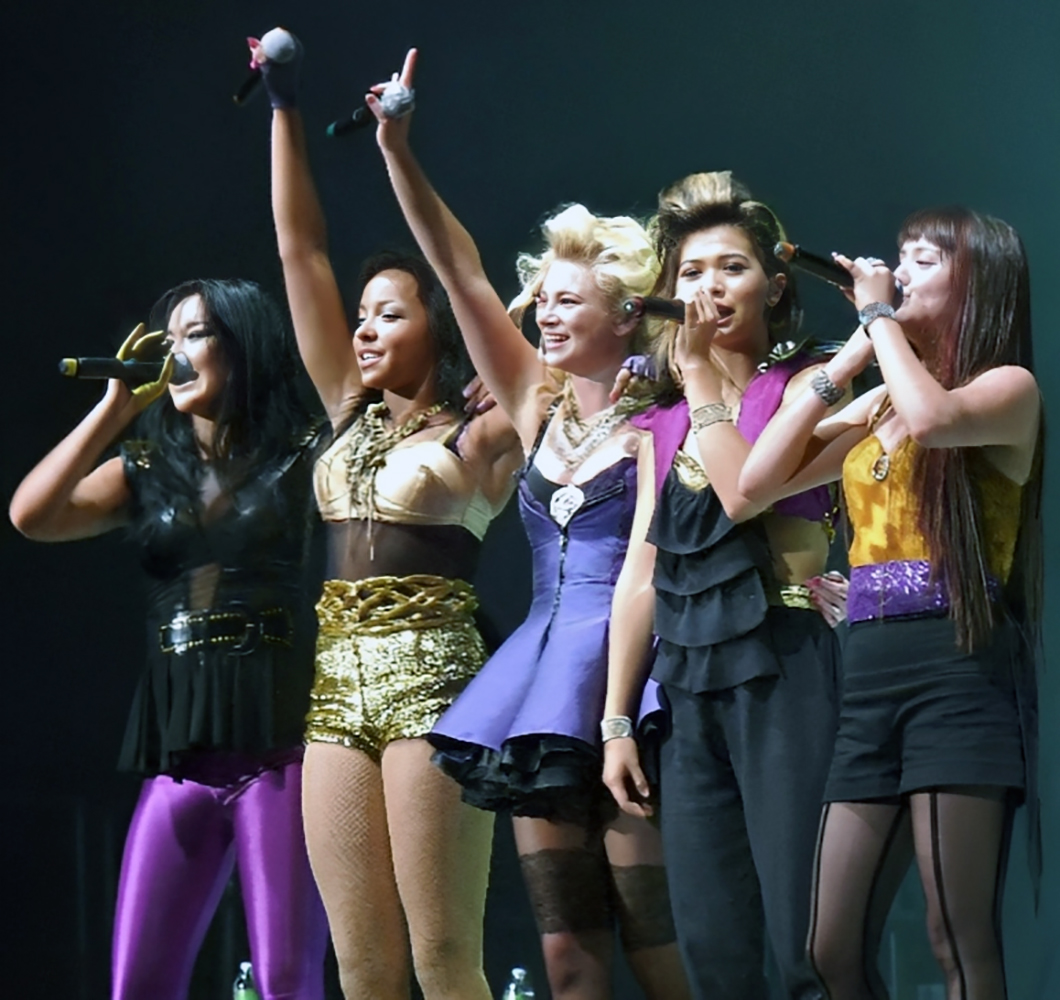
The Stunners performing on Justin Bieber's My World Tour in July 2010 (L–R: Hudson, Tinashe, Gonino, Kiyoko, and Esparza)

They released the single "We Got It" with a music video in February 2010. Later in 2010, they signed to Universal Republic Records and released the single "Dancin' Around the Truth" to iTunes as well as Top 40 radio stations. The music video premiered June 2, just before the group was announced as an opening act on Justin Bieber's My World Tour.

They had finished their run after twenty dates on the tour and returned to LA to record new songs with producers and writers such as Toby Gad, The Cataracs, Dave Broome, Livvi Franc, Sheppard Soloman, Jimmy Harry and Tony Kanal of No Doubt fame. They shot a fourth music video in the desert of California in November for their new song "Spin The Bottle" which premiered on December 31, 2010. A full album along with an official second single titled "Heart Stops Beating", written by Tinashe and Allie and produced by Orange Factory Music was planned, but canceled when the group disbanded in 2011.

== Discography ==
=== Extended play ===
Title	EP details
The Stunners	Released: September 29, 2009; Format: Digital download; Label: Universal Republic

=== Singles ===
List of singles, with selected chart positions
Title	Year	Peak chart positions		Album
Title	Year	US Dance	US A/C	Album
"Bubblegum"	2009	—	—	Non-album single
"Santa Bring My Soldier Home"	2009	—	19	Non-album single
"We Got It"	2010	14	—	The Stunners
"Dancin' Around the Truth" (featuring New Boyz)	2010	—	—	The Stunners
"Spin the Bottle"	2010	—	—	Non-album singles
"—" denotes releases that did not chart or were not released in that territory.

=== Other appearances ===
Title	Year	Album
"Let's Hear It for the Boy"	2008	iCarly

=== Music videos ===
Title	Year	Director
"Bubblegum"	2009	Mike Nazzaro
"We Got It"	2010	Garrett Rosenblum and Ori Ravid
"Dancin' Around the Truth"	2010	Smallz and Rasking
"Spin the Bottle"	2010	Travis Hoffman

== Concert tours ==
Opening act

- My World Tour (Justin Bieber) (2010)
