= Stormworld =

- Title card
- Genre: Science fiction-drama
- Created by: John Goldsmith; Paul Barron
- Written by: Robert Greenberg; Alex Burrows, David Ogilvie, Bryan McQueen-Mason and others
- Directed by: Mark DeFriest; Ted McQueen-Mason
- Starring: Andrew Jenkins; Calum Worthy; Valentina Barron; Lim Kay Tong; Andrew Kavadas
- Theme music composer: Tim Count; Keith VanGeyzel
- Countries of origin: Australia; Canada
- Original language: English
- No. of seasons: 1
- No. of episodes: 26

Production
- Executive producers: Paul Barron; Shawn Williamson
- Producers: Paul Barron; Stephen Hegyes
- Production locations: Western Australia, Australia; Burnaby, British Columbia
- Cinematography: Simon Akkerman
- Editors: Edward McQueen-Mason; Bryan McQueen-Mason
- Camera setup: Nigel Tomkinson; Rusty Geller
- Running time: 26 minutes
- Production companies: Brightlight Pictures Television; Great Western Entertainment

Original release
- Network: Nine Network; Space
- Release: 18 March – 9 September 2009

Stormworld is a drama television series which first aired on Canadian TV channel Space on March 18, 2009 with a repeat broadcast in August 2009, and aired in Australia on the Nine Network in 2009.

== Plot ==
The show follows best friends Jason (Andrew Jenkins) and Lee (Calum Worthy), after they are transported through a vortex while on a boat trip that started in Vancouver, Canada, to the alien world "Stormworld". The boys receive help from Flees (Valentina Barron), a seasoned survivor of Stormworld who uses a boat to navigate the hostile environment. The boys, as new arrivals or "access crashers" as the local inhabitants call them, find shelter at The Settlement.

Stormworld is a destination for people and objects from many different worlds. Transport to Stormworld happens when a vortex is created between Stormworld and another world by large beetle-like insects. The surface of Stormworld is a saltwater ocean with many islands that have a generally hot climate. Fresh water is a scarce resource that is central to the survival of all inhabitants, making it a sought-after resource. Trade and barter of the objects brought through the vortices operate as the basis of the inhabitants' economy.

There are three principal groups on Stormworld, between which conflict regularly occurs: The Settlement, The Arkoddians, and The Drogue.

The Settlement is a constitutionally-based society with democratic principles. The Settlement is located at the Sighing Peaks on an island. It was founded by Werrolda who wrote its constitution. When Jason and Lee arrive, Werrolda is the leader. High on a hill not far from the Settlement is a beacon that flashes a bright light at regular intervals to attract other "access crashers" after arriving in a Vortex.

The Arkoddians are a tightly hierarchical society run by the patriarchs. They live on an island a significant distance away from the Settlement. Each Arkoddian requires more water per day than a human. Some of the Arkoddians are armed with lazbolts. Unlike most of the other people on Stormworld, the Arkoddians appear to have arrived as a group on a large boat.

The Drogue are a small band of thugs that prey on the Settlement and collect objects from the vortices. They are equipped with flybikes that are armed with energy cannons.

The Abiders were a race of people who occupied Stormworld sometime ago. They placed the sighing peaks in order to create a map, and presumably were the creators of the portal that leads off the planet.

== Notable Characters ==
- Jason (Andrew Jenkins) – an athletic, high-energy, positive person who has strong leadership qualities. Lee is his best friend, also from Earth and arrived on Stormworld at the same time. Jason is the pilot of the boat named Cougar. In the final episode he decides to stay behind with Flees and Ogee and become leader of The Settlement.
- Lee (Calum Worthy) – an intelligent, savvy and logical individual with a strong scientific mind. He arrived on Stormworld with his best friend, Jason. Lee wants very much to return to Earth, which he does in episode 26.
- Flees (Valentina Barron) – arrived 7 years ago with her father, an engineer, after their small aircraft was drawn through a vortex from Earth. Flees' father disappeared four years after their arrival on Stormworld when he went out kayaking. Now 15 years old, she has continued an ongoing search to find her missing father for the past 3 years. In her searching, she has acquired an excellent knowledge of geography of Stormworld. Luce regards Flees as an older sister.
- Ogee (voiced by Andrew Kavadas) – an extremely clever talking bowling ball.
- Khelioz (Lim Kay Tong) – also known as The Navigator. On his home world of Maren, Khelioz was a fisherman. On Stormworld he is a trader with a small sailing vessel who is trying to collect information to learn where the portal is for people to return to their home planets. His methods are often viewed as being sneaky or self-serving.

== Episodes ==
Stormworld consists of 26 episodes The series aired weekly on Wednesdays, over the course of 7 months in 2009 between the months of March and September.

Episode Number	Episode Title	Initial Date of Release
1	Three Sun Day	18 March 2009
2	The Settlement	25 March 2009
3	Barter, Barter Everywhere	1 April 2009
4	Callaghan	8 April 2009
5	Salvage Rights	15 April 2009
6	Out of the Frying Pan	22 April 2009
7	Follow the Bouncing Ball	13 May 2009
8	Escape from New Arkoddia	20 May 2009
9	Family Ties	27 May 2009
10	Changing Ties	3 June 2009
11	Farmer Flees	10 June 2009
12	Family First	17 Jun, 2009
13	The Race is On	24 June 2009
14	Luce Island	8 July 2009
15	Deep Down	15 July 2009
16	Fire and Flight	29 July 2009
17	The Old Order Changes	5 August 2009
18	Raising the Cougar	5 August 2009
19	A Hot Bath	12 August 2009
20	A Handful of Sand	12 August 2009
21	Lord of the Flybikes	19 August 2009
22	Twists and Turns	19 August 2009
23	Liberation Day	26 August 2009
24	The Great Water	26 August 2009
25	Long Way Home	2 September 2009
26	Homeward Bound	2 September 2009

== International syndication ==
Country	TV Networks
Australia	Nine Network, ABC3
Canada	Space
Israel	Arutz HaYeladim
Kenya	Kenya Television Network
Croatia	HRT
Brazil	HBO Family
Bulgaria	BNT 1

== Production ==
The series was shot in Australia and Canada in 2008. Post-production sound and effects was done by Kojo Productions, who sued the production company for more than $265,000 in 2010 for unpaid invoices.

== Critical response ==
When it premiered in Canada, it was called a "a hyper-flimsy sci-fi offering" with "cheesy low-budget special effects".

Andre Jenkins, Calum Worthy, and Valentina Barron were all nominated for the Best Performance in a TV Series at the 2010 Young Artist Awards with Worthy winning the award for leading young actor in a drama series.
