= Caitlin EJ Meyer =

American actress

Caitlin Meyer
- Born: Caitlin Elizabeth Joelle Meyer; February 29, 1992 (age 34); Salt Lake City, Utah, U.S.
- Occupation: Actress
- Years active: 1997–present

Caitlin Elizabeth Joelle Meyer (born February 29, 1992) is an American actress. She has won two Young Artist Awards for her performances.

== Filmography ==
=== Film ===
Year	Title	Role	Notes
2001	Little Secrets	Isabelle	
2002	I Saw Mommy Kissing Santa Claus	Mary Poindexter	
2002	Handcart	Young Larsen child	uncredited
2003	A Pioneer Miracle	Belle Richards at age 8	short film
2006	Pirates of the Great Salt Lake	Girl Scout #1	
2006	Take a Chance	Lindsay Harris	direct-to-video
2006	Against Type	Jenny	TV movie
2006	Samuel the Lamanite	Stacy	
2007	Belle and the Beast: A Latter-Day Tale	Kelli	
2007	Saving Sarah Cain	Courtney	
2007	Turn Around	Ashley Pratt	
2009	One Man's Treasure	Allison	
2009	Minor Details	Paige	
2009	Getting Ahead	Jennifer Lunt	short film
2010	You're So Cupid	Lily Valentine	
2010	I Love You Bernie Summersby	Young Agnes Summersby	short film
2010	Hunger Games: Katniss & Rue	Glimmer	short film
2011	17 Miracles	Tamar Loader	
2012	Life According to Penny	Lila	short film
2012	Abide with Me	Abigail	short film
2012	Christmas Oranges	Rose's Mother / Grace Crampton	
2015	The Cokeville Miracle	Penny Young	
2015	Miracle Maker	Sarrah Cronin	
2016	Alienate	Caitlin	
2016	The Christmas Project	Monica Goodman	
2020	The Christmas Project Reunion	Monica	

=== Television ===
Year	Title	Role	Notes
1997	Mother Knows Best	Flower Girl at Wedding	TV movie uncredited
2001	Cover Me: Based on the True Life of an FBI Family	Annie	Episode: "The River"
2002	It's a Miracle	Girl crying in classroom	Episode: "Angel Intervention"
2002	JAG	Zuzello Girl	Episode: "In Thin Air"
2006	Against Type	Jenny	TV movie
2014	Nowhere Safe	Lisa	TV movie
