= The Coppertop Flop Show =

- Genre: Comedy shorts
- Created by: Derek Baynham; Kelly May; Calum Worthy
- Starring: Calum Worthy
- Country of origin: United States
- Original language: English
- No. of seasons: 1
- No. of episodes: 22

Production
- Camera setup: Videotape

Original release
- Network: Disney Channel
- Release: August 1, 2013 – February 6, 2014

The Coppertop Flop Show, also known as Coppertop Flop, is a series of television shorts which first aired on the Disney Channel on August 1, 2013. The series was created by Derek Baynham, Kelly May and Calum Worthy. Individual episodes are quick comedy sketches, less than 5 minutes in length. The final original short premiered on February 6, 2014.

== Cast ==
- Calum Worthy as himself

=== Special guests ===
- Grant Linden as himself
- Meaghan Martin as herself
- Debby Ryan as herself
- Allie Gonino as herself
- John Paul Green as himself

== Episodes ==
The following are the 22 episode shorts of The Coppertop Flop Show.

No.	Title	Original release date	Prod. code
1	"Food Enthusiast"	August 1, 2013	4
While at a restaurant with his friends, Calum enjoys every bite of his dinner.
2	"King of the Beach"	August 4, 2013	12
Calum is "The King of the Beach".
3	"Calum's Splishy Splashy Land"	August 9, 2013	9
Calum opens a new water park, Splishy Splashy Land.
4	"Camp Calum"	August 9, 2013	N/A
Calum introduces a new camp! Camp Calum!
5	"Suspender Wrangler"	August 16, 2013	21
Calum introduces the behind the scenes action of Austin & Ally, and meets the Suspender Wrangler.
6	"Bro Battle"	August 23, 2013	5
What starts out as a simple 'hey bro', quickly turns into a battle of wits to see who can come up with the best 'bro-ism'.
7	"Tap Step"	October 4, 2013	1
Calum explains how he invented a brand a new type of dance that combines his love of tap dance with dubstep – he calls it 'tap step'.
8	"Ghost Writer"	October 11, 2013	N/A
Calum's fans have been asking how he comes up with the sketches for the Coppertop Flop Show. Calum explains that he has a writing partner – who happens to be a ghost!
9	"The Mayor of Scare"	October 11, 2013	20
Brent Fontelroy is the world's leading producer of spooky sound effect recordings.
10	"S'Up with Debby Ryan (Part 1)"	October 18, 2013	10
Calum interviews his celebrity crush, Debby Ryan!
11	"S'Up with Debby Ryan (Part 2)"	October 25, 2013	11
Calum pitches Debby Ryan his fashion ideas.
12	"Woot Coach (Part 1)"	November 1, 2013	2
Calum is an in-demand vocal coach to the stars. Only thing is, instead of coaching their singing, he focuses on how they 'woot', 'oh yeah!' and 'c'mon now'.
13	"Woot Coach (Part 2)"	November 8, 2013	3(?)
When your song needs a hand clap, a shaker, a triangle, or an intense bongo rhythm, Calum is your go-to guy.
14	"Newsworthy (Part 1)"	November 14, 2013	6(?)
Newsworthy finds out why Calum Worthy is sneezing!
15	"Newsworthy (Part 2)"	November 21, 2013	7
Newsworthy catches Calum Worthy at a park preparing for an audition.
16	"Master Wrapper"	November 28, 2013	N/A
Calum raps about his holiday skills.
17	"Drum Tutorial"	January 3, 2014	8
Calum explains how to play the drums.
18	"Flop On The Lot (Part 1)"	January 9, 2014	14
Calum finds some creative ways to make a few extra bucks.
19	"Flop on The Lot (Part 2)"	January 21, 2014	19
Calum shows off his fun way of heading from his dressing room to the set.
20	"Extreme Calum"	January 24, 2014	15
Calum takes life to the extreme!
21	"The Snack Artist"	January 30, 2014	16
Jeffreyg is a Snack Artist, aka a Snartist.
22	"Code Red"	February 6, 2014	18
Go on an adventure with debonair spy Calum, codename Red.

== See also ==
- Brian O'Brian
- Mr. Bean
