= Brian O'Brian =

2008 Italian-American TV series

- Genre: Comedy shorts
- Created by: Danny Kaplan and Brian Stepanek
- Starring: Brian Stepanek
- Countries of origin: Italy; United States
- Original language: Non-verbal
- No. of seasons: 1
- No. of episodes: 40

Production
- Executive producer: Danny Kaplan
- Running time: 2–4 minutes

Original release
- Network: Disney Channel
- Release: October 3, 2008 – April 3, 2009

Brian O'Brian is a series of television shorts airing on Disney Channel. The series is co-written and directed by Danny Kaplan and stars Brian Stepanek; original score by Stuart Balcomb, and produced in Cologno Monzese near Milan, Italy. Individual episodes are quick comedy sketches, 2–4 minutes in length. The series is non-verbal, with no dialogue from the characters, and there are no written words on the signs. Much like almost all of Disney's modern-day television comedy programming, the show uses a laugh track. The main character Brian is inspired by the physical comedy of such silent-screen greats as Charlie Chaplin and Buster Keaton.

An ad promoting the premiere of Brian O'Brian was shown during the premiere of The Suite Life on Deck on September 26, 2008, on Disney Channel, and the series premiered on October 3, 2008. In Latin America, it premiered on February 16, 2009 on Disney Channel Latin America. The season started on September 16, 2008 on Disney Channel Italy.

== Episodes ==
No.	Title	Directed by	Written by	Original U.S. air date
1	"Operaman"	Danny Kaplan	Danny Kaplan, Brian Stepanek	October 3, 2008
In Italy, Brian impersonates a famous opera singer in an opera house who is singing Largo al factotum.
2	"The Pool"	Danny Kaplan	Danny Kaplan, Brian Stepanek	October 3, 2008
Brian plays around with different swimming pool toys in a swimming pool, which a strict lifeguard forbids.
3	"Assembly Required"	Danny Kaplan	Danny Kaplan, Brian Stepanek	October 10, 2008
Brian attempts to build a coffee table out of a tree log, but ends up with a lot of weird creations, including a birdhouse and a toothpick (which he literally uses to try to pick a food bit stuck in between his teeth!).
4	"Basketball"	Danny Kaplan	Danny Kaplan, Brian Stepanek	October 10, 2008
Brian plays basketball at the gym.
5	"Band"	Danny Kaplan	Danny Kaplan, Brian Stepanek	October 17, 2008
Brian plays all the instruments in an imaginary band in his house, including an air guitar.
6	"Babysitter"	Danny Kaplan	Danny Kaplan, Brian Stepanek	October 17, 2008
Brian tries to take care of a baby.
7	"Dancing"	Danny Kaplan	Danny Kaplan, Brian Stepanek	October 24, 2008
Brian shows off his dance moves in a small dance club.
8	"Doubles"	Danny Kaplan	Danny Kaplan, Brian Stepanek	October 24, 2008
Brian tries to impress his girlfriend Veronica on the tennis court.
9	"Bones"	Danny Kaplan	Danny Kaplan, Brian Stepanek	October 31, 2008
Brian visits the museum of natural history. He eventually breaks some dinosaur bones but manages to escape trouble.
10	"Up and Away!"	Danny Kaplan	Danny Kaplan, Brian Stepanek	October 31, 2008
When Lucy falls off her bike, Brian tries to cheer her up by giving her a few balloons. However, when he gives her too many balloons, her bike starts to fly away. This leads Brian on a comic chase through the park.
11	"Flower Power"	Unknown	Unknown	November 7, 2008
Brian tries to shop for flowers.
12	"Date O'Date"	Danny Kaplan	Danny Kaplan, Brian Stepanek	November 8, 2008
Brian tries on various outfits for his date, many of them looking ridiculous or embarrassing. In the end, he decides to stick to his usual outfit (a blue checkered jumper and a pair of brown pants).
13	"Cookin'"	Danny Kaplan	Danny Kaplan, Brian Stepanek	November 14, 2008
Brian works at a restaurant and nearly gets fired because of his clumsiness.
14	"Veronica"	Danny Kaplan	Danny Kaplan, Brian Stepanek	November 15, 2008
Brian's girlfriend Veronica is on her way to his house and Brian has not cleaned. Thinking that cleaning his house is a time-consuming process, Brian lazily shoves almost everything into his small wardrobe. Later, Veronica comes but unfortunately, when Brian greets her, the wardrobe door bursts, creating a huge mess in his living-room. Although Veronica is upset at Brian for not cleaning his house properly, in the end the two of them clean Brian's house together.
15	"Rain"	Danny Kaplan	Danny Kaplan, Brian Stepanek	December 26, 2008
On a rainy day, Brian tries to stop his roof from leaking. He eventually makes a band with pots and pans.

== See also ==
- The Coppertop Flop Show
- Mr. Bean
