= Valentina Barron =

Australian actress

- Born: Valentina Marina Barron; 9 February 1993 (age 33); Australia
- Occupation: Actress
- Years active: 2005–present
- Children: 1

Valentina Marina Barron (born 9 February 1993) is an Australian actress, best known for her role as Flees in Stormworld.

== Filmography ==
Year	Film/Show	Role	Notes
2009	Stormworld	Flees	26 episodes
2007	Wormwood	Jarrod Schnozz	recurring role
2005	Streetsmartz	Samantha (Sammi) Martino	3 episodes

== Awards/Nominations ==
Year	Award	Category	Result	Film
2010	Young Artist Award	Best Performance in a TV Series (Comedy or Drama) – Leading Young Actress	Won	Stormworld
2010	Young Artist Award	Best Performance in a TV Series (Comedy or Drama) – Outstanding Young	Nominated	Stormworld
