= High Voltage (2018 film) =

- Film poster
- Directed by: Alex Keledjian
- Written by: Alex Keledjian
- Produced by: Luke Daniels; Dwjuan F. Fox; Ryan Gibson; Michael D. Jones; Alex Keledjian; Kellie Madison; Alan Pao
- Starring: David Arquette; Allie Gonino; Ryan Donowho; Perrey Reeves; Luke Wilson
- Cinematography: Cameron Duncan
- Edited by: Chase B. Kenney
- Music by: Chris Hayman
- Production companies: Sword Entertainment; Aurum Film Group; Chicago Media Angels
- Distributed by: Sony Pictures Home Entertainment
- Release date: October 19, 2018
- Running time: 92 minutes
- Country: United States
- Language: English

High Voltage is a 2018 American science fiction horror film written and directed by Alex Keledjian and starring David Arquette, Allie Gonino, Ryan Donowho, Perrey Reeves and Luke Wilson. The film was also known as Hollow Body.

Washed-up one-hit-wonder Jimmy Kleen (David Arquette) forms a new band fronted by Rachel (Allie Gonino) in hopes of making a comeback. Unfortunately Rachel is shy and crippled by stage fright. After being struck by lightning she comes back to life as a confident rock diva, leading the band to success. However, the undead Rachel tends to electrocute every man she hooks up with, leading to Kleen's conflict between his conscience and his desire for success.

== Cast ==
- David Arquette as Jimmy
- Allie Gonino as Rachel
- Ryan Donowho as Scott
- Erik Stocklin as Zach
- Elizabeth Rice as Carrie
- Bekka Walker as Chloe
- Perrey Reeves as Barb
- Luke Wilson as Rick

== Reception ==
The film has a 33% rating on Rotten Tomatoes.
