= Emily Evan Rae =

American actress

- Born: 1999 (age 27); Weston, Florida, U.S.
- Occupation: Actress
- Years active: 2007–present

Emily Evan Rae Argenti (born 1999) is an American actress.

== Filmography ==
Year	Film/show	Role	Notes
2011	It's Always Sunny in Philadelphia	Justine	Episode: "Frank Reynolds' Little Beauties"
2010	The Blue Light	Jenny	
2010	Phoenix Falling	Jenny Greco	
2009	Private Practice	Tammy Larsen	Episode: "The Way We Were"
2009	Lost	Young Kate	Episode: "The Incident"
2009	The Office	Rebecca Prince	Episodes: "Two Weeks" and "Prince Family Paper"
2007–2010	Jimmy Kimmel Live!	Herself	10 episodes
2008	Life	Kid	Episode: "Black Friday"

== Awards and nominations ==
Year	Award	Category	Result	Film
2010	Young Artist Award	Best Performance in a TV Series (Comedy or Drama) - Guest Starring Young Actress	Won	Private Practice
