= Private (web series) =

Private is an American web series produced by Alloy Entertainment based on the novels of the same name by Kate Brian.

The series was announced in May 2009, beginning with a contest allowing female readers the chance to audition for the role of Kiran Hayes. It was also announced that the series would adapt the first four books via 20 episodes, each with a standard length of four to six minutes.

A DVD with episodes of the series was released by Newvideo.

== Contest ==
Private: The Casting Call was the contest in which three contestants competed for the role of Kiran Hayes in the Web adaptation of Private.

Episode number	Original air date	Plot	Host	Appearances	Judges
1	July 7, 2009	Janine, Nicole and Sanna have 2 minutes to memorize their lines. The winner gets to have dinner with Brant Daugherty (Thomas Pearson).	Kelsey Sanders (Reed Brennan)	Brant Daugherty (Thomas Pearson)	Bob Levy (Gossip Girl Executive Producer), Sarah Kucserka, Veronica Becker (writers of Private: The Webseries)
2	July 14, 2009	The girls compete in convincing the judges that their friends at Billings House are more important to them than their career.	Kelsey Sanders (Reed Brennan)	Susie Castillo (former Miss USA, MTV VJ, Neutrogena spokeswoman)	Bob Levy (Gossip Girl Executive Producer), Sarah Kucserka, Veronica Becker (writers of Private: The Webseries), Susie Castillo
3	July 21, 2009	The girls compete to star in an o.b. commercial.	Kelsey Sanders (Reed Brennan)	Stuart Acher (director)	Bob Levy (Gossip Girl Executive Producer), Sarah Kucserka, Veronica Becker (writers of Private: The Webseries), Nikki Wise
4	July 28, 2009	The girls compete in a scene with Blake and Reed and one girl (Janine) is eliminated.	Kelsey Sanders (Reed Brennan)	Evan Taubenfeld (Blake Pearson)	Bob Levy (Gossip Girl Executive Producer), Sarah Kucserka, Veronica Becker (writers of Private: The Webseries)
5	August 4, 2009	Sanna and Nicole compete in a scene with Reed, Noelle and Ariana.	Kelsey Sanders (Reed Brennan)	Samantha Cope (Noelle Lange), Natalie Floyd (Ariana Osgood)	Bob Levy (Gossip Girl Executive Producer), Sarah Kucserka, Veronica Becker (writers of Private: The Webseries)
6	August 11, 2009	The winner of the role of Kiran Hayes (Sanna) is announced.	Kelsey Sanders (Reed Brennan)	-	Bob Levy (Gossip Girl Executive Producer), Sarah Kucserka, Veronica Becker (writers of Private: The Webseries)

== Episode list ==
Episode number	Original air date	Plot
1	August 11, 2009	Reed Brennan arrives at Easton Academy, and learns that there are many dark secrets hidden within the school walls.
2	August 12, 2009	Reed learns that she must strive hard to be accepted as a true 'Billings Girl'; Ariana warns Reed about Thomas Pearson.
3	August 13, 2009	Reed undergoes even more protocol to become a Billings Girl; Eleanor Billings tells Noelle to keep a good eye on Reed.
4	August 18, 2009	Reed and Thomas kiss for the first time and someone records it with a phone.
5	August 19, 2009	While Taylor helps Reed with homework, Reed gets a text message from Noelle telling her to meet her ASAP. Noelle and the other Billing girls give Reed two minutes to go get a physics test for Ariana(even though Ariana doesn't take physics). End with her reward is going to a real Easton party, the bonfire.
6	August 20, 2009	Reed enjoys the bonfire party. While going to replenish drinks for everyone, she discovers Kiran and Blake making out by a tree. When she gets back, she gets a surprise from an unnaturally aggressive Thomas. Reed decides to stay with her friends, and not go with the overly distraught Thomas.
7	August 25, 2009	Reed tries to call Thomas to tell him that she wants him and just didn't want to choose between him and her friends (she thinks that she shouldn't have to) but she has to tell this all to his voicemail. Noelle has her necklace for the Legacy and all the other girls are jealous. Taylor wishes that she could go, but she's hoping that Josh will take her as his plus-one. Reed calls Thomas again and tells him that she's never felt about anyone like this before, someone listens to her conversation while hiding in the bushes. Josh goes to tell Reed that no one has seen Thomas all day and that he never came home after the party.
8	August 26, 2009	The Billings Girls try to convince Reed that Thomas is okay. After Reed leaves, Ariana says that Thomas "is bad news and he did her a favor by leaving". Reed gets a text from Thomas saying that he is fine. She goes back to her room and a detective is waiting for her in there. Josh asks Reed to the Legacy and she accepts, even though she knows Taylor likes him.
9	August 27, 2009	Reed is going to the Legacy with Noelle, Kiran, and Ariana. Taylor is upset with Reed because she thinks Reed likes Josh. Reed explains that she is worried about Thomas and this is her only chance to see him, and Taylor forgives her because she didn't know. At the party, Reed is slightly tipsy and thinks she spots Thomas.
10	September 1, 2009	Reed confronts the Thomas look-alike learning that it is only Blake Pearson. Upset and worried, Josh convinces Reed to go have some fun and forget about Thomas for one night convincing her he is just pulling a stunt and is fine. After dancing with her fellow Billings Girls, it is revealed by Taylor that Thomas is actually dead and his body has been found.
11	September 2, 2009	The next day, The Billings Girls are at Thomas's funeral in the school chapel. After paying their respects, The Billings Girls learn that Blake is leaving Easton Academy. After talking with Josh in the hallway it is revealed by Detective Hill that Thomas's death was actually a murder and Reed and all her friends are to be brought in for questioning.
12	September 3, 2009	Reed and all of her friends are questioned individually. Reed revealing she got a text from Thomas, Ariana claiming Reed had nothing to do with it, Kiran clearing up the name of Thomas's supplier, and Noelle trying to pin the whole thing on Josh Hollis. Noelle says, "Thomas stormed off into the woods and Josh went after him. He looked like he wanted to beat the crap out of Thomas." Detective Hill tells Reed that the text she got is a phony and that she is his number one suspect.
13	September 8, 2009	Reed is initiated into the Billings House and becomes "a real Billings girl".
14	September 9, 2009	Thomas's dealer Rick Pepper is arrested so the Billings girls take Reed out on a surprise shopping trip. During this trip, Reed overhears Taylor crying about Thomas in a dressing room and Noelle and Arianna trying to keep her quiet. Taylor goes back to school early on the pretense of a family emergency, however when they return to school, Reed finds that Taylor is gone, along with all of her belongings. Reed demands information from Noelle, who claims that Taylor has been committed because of the incident. Noelle also reveals that Rick Pepper has been released, and that Josh has been arrested instead.
15	September 10, 2009	Reed visits Josh in jail where she learns that he is being held because the murder weapon was a baseball bat of Josh's, however Josh revealed to Reed that the bat was stolen weeks ago. Josh also tells Reed that he got into a fight with Thomas that night, and the only other person he saw after, was Thomas' brother Blake. Josh convinces Reed that he is being framed. Reed confronts Kiran for information on Blake's whereabouts, and then goes after him, to try to get Josh an alibi. Someone is spying on Reed in the bushes.
16	September 15, 2009	Reed discovers that the person in the bushes was Blake. He has a shotgun, which he claims he doesn't know how to use. She explains Josh's plight, and Blake agrees to go to the cops to give him an alibi. He also offers to drive Reed back to Easton. As she goes to put her bag in the trunk she discovers the bloodied shirt Thomas was wearing the night that he was killed. She then runs away from Blake, into the woods where she is nabbed by an unidentified person.
17	September 16, 2009	Reed is running through the woods and discovers that person who grabbed her was a police officer. She tells the police about what she saw in the trunk and Blake gets arrested. Back at the police station Noelle asks Reed if the leather jacket and cell phone were found also, and she tells Reed that she isn't at all surprised. Josh is released and is very grateful to Reed. At the end of the episode an unidentified person (presumably female) is seen with Thomas's jacket and cell phone, which they then destroy.
18	September 17, 2009	The Billings girls go to a party. Taylor left behind her handbag and all of the Billings decide that she would have wanted Reed to have it. At the party Reed finds a note from Taylor in her purse telling her not to trust the Billings Girls.
19	September 22, 2009	After finding Taylor's note, Reed notices Ariana taking pictures of Noelle and Kiran. She remembers what Taylor said--"the proof is in the pictures." She sees Ariana leaving and follows her to the cloakroom where she gets Ariana's phone and sees a video clip of her and Thomas kissing. Ariana sees Reed and Noelle and Kiran come in just to have Reed see a clip of them and Thomas—whose hair they are cutting off. The Billings Girls tell Reed that they left him there after that and Reed says she believes them just to push them and run out of the room where she is chased by Ariana and is left dangerously close to the ledge.
20	September 24, 2009	Reed is on the rooftop with Ariana. As she starts to piece everything together and realizes that Ariana killed Thomas, Noelle comes to the rescue to save Reed. A fight ensues and just as Ariana has Reed dangling over the edge of the building the police come and arrest Ariana, who Reed had called, after listening to her full confession. Josh and Reed share a moment of eye-contact. Afterwards Reed knows that she is a true Billings girl.
