= Allie Gonino =

American actress and singer

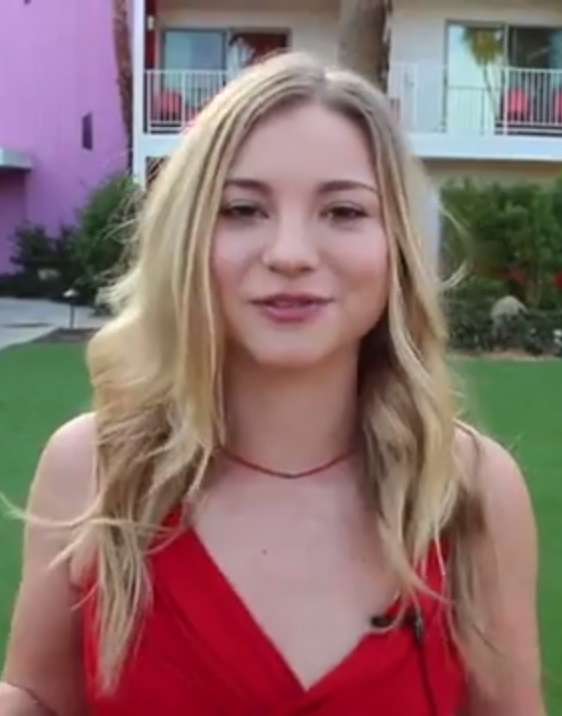
- Gonino behind the scenes of the film Hidden Away (2013)
- Born: Alyssa Gonino; March 30, 1990 (age 36); Rockwall, Texas, U.S.
- Occupations: Actress; singer
- Years active: 2007–present
- Musical career
- Genres: Folk rock; indie rock
- Instruments: Vocals; guitar; mandolin; keyboards
- Formerly of: The Stunners

Alyssa Gonino (born March 30, 1990) is an American actress and singer. She is known for her regular role as Laurel Mercer in The Lying Game and her recurring role as Michelle in 10 Things I Hate About You, both of which were ABC Family series. Gonino was a member of the American girl group the Stunners between 2007 and 2011. Gonino is currently in the band the Good Mad, who were featured in The Lying Game, in which Gonino also starred.

== Early life ==
Gonino was born in Rockwall, Texas. Her parents are Dr. John and Linda Gonino, who own and operate the Gonino Center for Healing in Heath, Texas. At the age of seven she started taking classical violin, and classical ballet lessons. For much of her childhood, she would perform at many of the country music oprys in the Dallas-Fort Worth area, singing, yodeling, and playing fiddle, and mandolin. In her high school years, Gonino became interested in musical theater. One month into her second year, she dropped out of high school to move to Los Angeles, and fully pursue a career in music and acting. At sixteen, she acquired her GED.

== Career ==
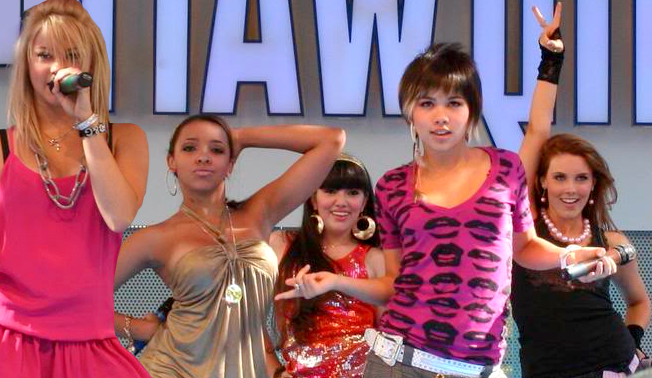
Gonino (left) with the other members of the Stunners in 2009.

In her early career as an actress, Gonino guest starred on the television series Unfabulous, Cory in the House, The Suite Life on Deck, Lie to Me, and had a recurring role as Michelle in the ABC Family series 10 Things I Hate About You. In 2007, Gonino joined the girl group the Stunners which was formed by recording artist Vitamin C. In summer 2010, after the release of their first single "Dancin' Around the Truth" featuring the New Boyz, the Stunners embarked on a 20 date venture as the opening act for Justin Bieber on My World Tour. The group has since disbanded.

Gonino co-starred as Laurel Mercer in the 2011–2013 ABC Family series The Lying Game. Gonino was also featured in a 2012 Boys Like Girls music video as the female lead for "Be Your Everything". In 2012 she was cast in the movie Geography Club which co-starred her 10 Things I Hate About You castmate Meaghan Martin. In 2013 she was cast to appear in the comedy-drama film See You in Vahalla with Sarah Hyland. Gonino was also cast in a main role on the Sundance Channel drama The Red Road in 2014. In 2015 she was cast in the recurring role of Sam on the fifth season of Freeform's Baby Daddy, but was subsequently replaced in the role by Daniella Monet.

In 2015 Gonino released the EP Hollywood High, which includes the single "Vamp".

== Filmography ==
Film roles
Year	Title	Role	Notes
2011	Cougar Hunting	Britney	
2013	Geography Club	Kimberly	
2015	See You in Valhalla	Tori	
2015	Fun Size Horror: Volume One	Allie	short film – segment: "The Collection"
2018	High Voltage	Rachel	also known as Hollow Body
2019	Ring Ring	Kelly	

Television roles
Year	Title	Role	Notes
2007	Cory in the House	Monique	Episode: "Gone Wishin'"
2007	Unfabulous	Yodeling Girl / Imposter Girl #1	Episode: "The Song"
2009	The Suite Life on Deck	Marissa	Episode: "Splash and Trash"
2009	Lie to Me	Susan	Episode: "Truth or Consequences"
2009	Rita Rocks	Allison	Recurring role (season 2), 5 episodes
2009–2010	10 Things I Hate About You	Michelle	Recurring role, 7 episodes
2011–2013	The Lying Game	Laurel Mercer	Main role
2013	Hidden Away	Rachel Cole / Sage Bennett	Television film
2013	The Coppertop Flop Show	Herself	Episodes: "Woot Coach: Part 1" & "Woot Coach: Part 2"
2014	Hawaii Five-0	Lea Nohoa	Episode: "Kanalu Hope Loa"
2014	A Lesson in Romance	Zoe Mills	Television film; also known as Mom and Dad Undergrads
2014–2015	The Red Road	Rachel Jensen	Main role, 12 episodes
2015	The Preacher's Sin	Jamie Barringer	Television film; also known as A Husband's Confession
2017	Scorpion	Jessie	Episode: "Crime Every Mountain"
2018	Power Rangers Hyperforce	Lady Guinevere	Web series; episode: "A Ranger in King Arthur's Court"
2019	NCIS: New Orleans	Natalie Layton	Episode: "Trust Me"
