= Mind of Mencia =

American comedy television series

- Also known as: Mind of Mencia with Carlos Mencia
- Created by: Carlos Mencia
- Starring: Carlos Mencia; Joseph Mencia
- Country of origin: United States
- No. of seasons: 4
- No. of episodes: 52

Original release
- Network: Comedy Central
- Release: July 6, 2005 – July 23, 2008

Mind of Mencia is an American comedy television series on the cable channel Comedy Central. Hosted by comedian Carlos Mencia, it aired over the course of four seasons from July 6, 2005, to July 23, 2008.

== History ==
The first season of Mind of Mencia ran from July 6, 2005, to September 28, 2005, premiering on Comedy Central with an initial order of ten episodes. Soon after that the series was renewed for a second season, set to air in winter of 2006. Season 2 premiered on March 22, 2006. The first season was released on DVD on March 21, 2006, to coincide with the premiere. The second season became Comedy Central's ninth highest rated program.

In a May 2006 Wall Street Journal article, Mencia said he initially resisted requests by his network to take a deal to do a stand-up comedy album on the Comedy Central label, but would now likely appear on one.

The series ended in 2008 after four seasons when Mencia decided against filming a fifth season, explaining "It would have felt repetitive and redundant. There's a lot of different doors that are opening for me...I truly have no idea what's next."

== Cast members ==
- Carlos Mencia
- Joseph Mencia
- Brad Williams
- Ray Payton

== Guest appearances ==
- James Adomian
- Dave Attell
- Robin Bain
- Josh Blue
- Peter Boyle
- Sufe Bradshaw
- Frank Caliendo
- Edge
- Pablo Francisco
- Joey Greco
- Chris Hansen
- Estelle Harris
- Tony Hawk
- Gabriel Iglesias
- Ken Jeong
- Jamie Kennedy
- Angela Kinsey
- Phil LaMarr
- Bobby Lee
- Mario Lopez
- Method Man
- Cheech Marin
- Tracy Morgan
- Abigail Mason
- Amaury Nolasco
- Lupe Ontiveros
- P.O.D.
- Smush Parker
- Jeff Richards
- Gene Simmons
- Aries Spears
- Three 6 Mafia
- Daniel Tosh
- Tom Virtue
- Billy Dee Williams
- Robin Williams
- Debra Wilson
- John Witherspoon

== Recurring characters and sketches ==
=== Punji ===
Punji is a Hindu storekeeper who insults customers with obvious physical and/or social problems, before telling them to "get the park out of my store". He often expresses the wish to be reincarnated as something the person is not likely to ever see/use (for example, he says "I hope I am reincarnated as your feet, so you will never see me again" to an obese woman). Before going on his tirades, he begs for forgiveness from various Hindu gods such as Shiva and Vishnu. Punji has been a storekeeper at "Heaven-11", a store that sells wives, and an electrical store.

=== Carlosaurus Rex ===
Carlosaurus Rex is a call-in kid's show that deals with serious/mature matters. The show is a parody of Barney & Friends and was originally hijacked from a Barney-like character, Larry the Lizard.

=== Judge Carlos ===
Carlos plays a judge, and with the help of the ghost of Johnnie Cochran looks at real life recent court cases.

=== The Adventures of Carlitos ===
An animated cartoon based on Carlos' life as a child.

== DVD releases ==
Each DVD set includes uncensored versions of each season's episodes with bonus features including commentary, a behind the scenes featurette, and deleted scenes.

Season	DVD release date	Episodes
1	March 21, 2006	12
2	April 3, 2007	15
3	October 23, 2007	15
4	November 11, 2008	10
