= Abigail Mason =

American actress

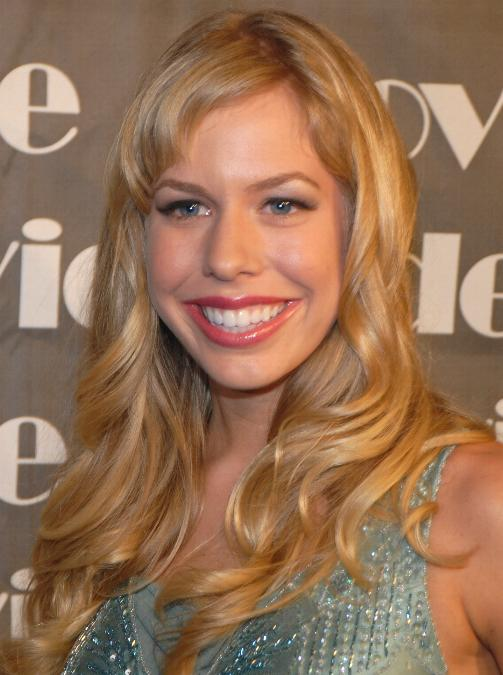
- Abigail Mason at the 16th Annual MovieGuide Faith and Values Awards Gala
- Occupation: Actress
- Notable work: Saving Sarah Cain
- Awards: "Grace Award" – Movieguide Awards 2008

Abigail Mason is an American actress. In 2008, she co-starred in Saving Sarah Cain. For her role, she won the "Grace Award" at the 16th Annual Movieguide Awards.

== Career ==
Since her move, Mason has appeared in projects playing vastly different roles. She played London's rival in The Suite Life of Zack and Cody and an amish orphan in Fox's Saving Sarah Cain. She won the Grace Award, with Bailee Madison, at the 16th annual MovieGuide awards.

== Filmography ==
=== Film ===
Year	Title	Role	Notes
2007	Others	Maisy	Direct-to-video
2007	Saving Sarah Cain	Lyddie Cottrell	
2014	Ashes of Eden	Jesse	
2014	Survivor	Anne	
2018	Wild Faith	Sarah	
2020	Lost Heart	Young Verna Howard	
2021	Bigfoot, UFOs and Jesus	Young Verna Howard	

=== Television ===
Year	Title	Role	Notes
2006	Mind of Mencia	Susie	Episode #2.1
2006	The Suite Life of Zack & Cody	St. Sylvia's Player	Episode: "Volley Dad"
2007	The 1/2 Hour News Hour	Meredith Sawyer	Episode #1.11
2013–2014	The Veracity of Truth	Ava Coast	4 episodes
2017	Chicago Fire	Trish	Episode: "Take a Knee"
