= Jerry Zandstra =

Gerald "Jerry" Zandstra, is an ordained minister in the Christian Reformed Church, and currently serves in Wayland CRC. He is a former Republican primary candidate for the United States Senate.

== Politics ==
Zandstra has been a long-standing supporter of the Republican Party. From 2000 to 2005, he held a position of Director of Programs with The Acton Institute, a conservative think-tank based in Grand Rapids, MI.

In May 2005, Zandstra announced that he would seek the Republican nomination for US Senate. Zandstra faced Keith Butler and Oakland County Sheriff Michael Bouchard, who went on to win the Republican primary in 2006.

Following his unsuccessful US Senate campaign, Zandstra returned to work at the Acton Institute.

== Legal Issues ==
In 2014, Zandstra led The Pyramid Campus Group who sought to purchase a pyramid-shaped building owned by Michigan-based Steelcase. It was announced on May 9, 2015, that the agreement fell through. Steelcase sold the Pyramid building to a Norman Development LLC who intended to lease the building to Switch. When Switch announced "plans to convert the pyramid and its surrounding property into the nation's largest data center east of the Mississippi River," Zandstra's group filed a lawsuit in Kent County Circuit Court.

== Christian Reformed Minister ==
Zandstra was ordained as an ordained minister of the Word in the Christian Reformed Church on October 6, 1991 at Midland Park, NJ. He served the following CR churches: Midland Park, NJ, 1991–93; Seymour, Grand Rapids, MI, 1993–2000; Hillside, Cutlerville, MI, 2001-06 (Leave, 2005–06); Interim, Wayland, MI, 2006–13; Wayland, MI, 2013

== Education Interest ==
Zandstra holds a Bachelor's degree from Calvin College, two Master's degrees from Calvin Theological Seminary, a Doctor of Divinity from Trinity Evangelical Divinity School, and a second doctorate from the Western Michigan University School of Public Affairs.

He has taught in the MBA program at Cornerstone University. Zandstra was also an advisor to the Kenyan Constitutional Committee.

Zandstra has been involved with forming Charter Schools and has been part of the creating of charter schools in Michigan.

== Acting ==
Zandstra played the character Reverend Jerry Wells in The Genesis Code, produced by American Epic Entertainment, of which, he has been the president.

== Personal life ==
Zandstra grew up in Highland, Indiana, and is also married and has three sons
