= Calum Worthy =

Canadian actor (born 1991)

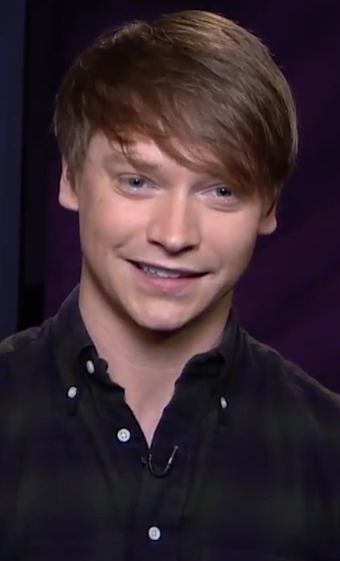
- Worthy in 2017
- Born: January 28, 1991 (age 35); Victoria, British Columbia, Canada
- Occupation: Actor
- Years active: 2001–present

Calum Worthy (born January 28, 1991) is a Canadian actor. He is known for his roles as Dez Wade on the Disney Channel series Austin & Ally, Alex Trimboli in the Netflix series American Vandal, Nicholas Godejohn in the Hulu series The Act, and himself in The Coppertop Flop Show. He has won two Young Artist Awards in the Leading Young Actor category for his performances in the comedy film National Lampoon's Thanksgiving Family Reunion (2003) and the science fiction television series Stormworld (2009). He also won the Leading Actor award at the 2010 Leo Awards for his performance in Stormworld.

Worthy has guest-starred in numerous television series, including ABC Family's Kyle XY, The CW's Supernatural and Smallville, CTV's Flashpoint, The Hub's R. L. Stine's The Haunting Hour: The Series, Disney Channel's Good Luck Charlie, and Disney XD's Zeke and Luther.

== Life and career ==
Worthy was born January 28, 1991, to Sandra Webster Worthy and David Worthy in Victoria, British Columbia. He made his screen debut at the age of 9, guest-starring in Fox's Night Visions (directed by Bill Pullman). At the age of 10, he starred in the three-episode British miniseries I Was a Rat. He has since completed more than 50 film and TV projects, and has worked in five countries—Canada, United States, Australia, the United Kingdom, and Singapore. He won two Young Artist Awards for Leading Young Actor in 2004 and 2010, while receiving a nomination for Best Performance in a Short Film – Young Actor for When Jesse Was Born in 2006. He also won a Leo Award for Best Performance in a Youth or Children's Program or Series in 2010.

Worthy resided in Los Angeles, California, while a series regular on the Disney Channel series Austin & Ally, of which he wrote one episode. In 2013, he created, wrote, and executive produced—along with Derek Baynham and Kelly May—the sketch comedy series The Coppertop Flop Show, which was picked up by Disney Channel to air in late 2013.

Worthy stated that when he had free time from filming Austin & Ally, he attended university. He also stated that when he has free time, he enjoys making sketches with friends.

In July 2017, Worthy was cast as Robbie Baldwin / Speedball in Freeform's New Warriors television series. The series, however, was ultimately not picked up.

In 2018, Worthy played Alex Trimboli in the first season of Netflix's American Vandal. In 2019, he played Nicholas Godejohn in the first season of The Act.

In February 2021, it was announced that Worthy had been cast as Jasper in the Netflix thriller series Pieces of Her, which is adapted from the Karin Slaughter novel of the same name.

He is co-founder and head of business development at 2wai, an AI education company.

== Filmography ==
=== Film ===
Year	Title	Role	Notes
2004	Scooby-Doo 2: Monsters Unleashed	Kid on bike	
2006	Dr. Dolittle 3	Tyler	
2007	The Last Mimzy	Teenage cyborg	
2008	Mulligans	Felix	
2009	What Goes Up	Blastoff! chorus	
2010	Daydream Nation	Craig	
2011	The Odds	Berry Lipke	
2011	The Big Year	Colin Debs	
2013	Rapture-Palooza	Clark Lewis	
2014	Mostly Ghostly: Have You Met My Ghoulfriend?	Colin Doyle	
2015	All She Wishes	Drake	
2015	Blackburn	Ryan	
2016	The Thinning	Kellan Woods	
2017	Bodied	Adam Merkin	
2018	The Thinning: New World Order	Kellan Woods	
2019	Corporate Animals	Aidan	
2019	Assimilate	Randy Foster	Originally titled Replicate
2024	Sew Torn	Joshua Armitage	

=== Television ===
Year	Title	Role	Notes
2001	Mysterious Ways	Alien / Kid clown	Episode: "Do You See What I See?"
2001	Night Visions	Prairie boy	Episode: "A View Through the Window"
2001	I Was a Rat	Roger/Ratty	3 episodes
2002	Beyond Belief: Fact or Fiction	Randy	Episode: "The Mandarin's Bowl"
2003	Out of Order	Young Mark	Miniseries
2003	Bunshiro and Fuku	Young Yonosuke	Television miniseries; voice role (English version)
2003	National Lampoon's Thanksgiving Family Reunion	Danny Snider	Television film
2004	The Days	Keenan	2 episodes
2004	Stargate Atlantis	Hunter kid	Episode: "Childhood's End"
2005	Reunion	Henry	Episode: "1989"
2006	Kyle XY	Toby Neuworth	Episode: "This Is Not a Test"
2006	Psych	Malone Breyfogle	Episode: "Shawn vs. the Red Phantom"
2007	Psych	Shockley	Episode: "If You're So Smart, Then Why Are You Dead?"
2007	Crossroads: A Story of Forgiveness	Kip	Television film
2007	Second Sight	Young Victor Kaufman	Television film
2008	Supernatural	Denny	Episode: "Wishful Thinking"
2009	Smallville	Garth Ranzz / Lightning Lad	Episode: "Legion"
2009	Stormworld	Lee	Main role
2009	Flashpoint	Billy Dresden	Episode: "Perfect Storm"
2009	Living Out Loud	Henry	Television film
2010	Tower Prep	Don Fincher	2 episodes
2010	Caprica	Cass	Episode: "Blowback"
2010	Bond of Silence	Shane Batesman	Television film; uncredited
2011	R. L. Stine's The Haunting Hour: The Series	Kelly	Episode: "Game Over"
2011	Good Luck Charlie	Lewis	Episode: "A L.A.R.P. in the Park"
2011	Zeke and Luther	Teddy	Episode: "Zeke and Lu's New Crew"
2011	Best Player	Zastrow	Television film
2011–2016	Austin & Ally	Dez Wade	Main role; writer: "Eggs & Extraterrestrials"
2012	Longmire	Zac Nunn	Episode: "8 Seconds"
2012	Jessie	Dez Wade	Episode: "Austin & Jessie & Ally All Star New Year"
2013–2014	The Coppertop Flop Show	Himself	Lead role; also writer and executive producer
2014	Some Assembly Required	Caden Clark	Episode: "Pop Superstar"
2015	Backstrom	Joshua Larimer	Episode: "Love Is a Rose and You Better Not Pick It"
2015	I Didn't Do It	Dez Wade	Episode: "Bite Club"
2015	Wander Over Yonder	Teen leader	Voice role; episode: "The Black Cube"
2016	Motive	Derek Holstadt	Episode: "Foreign Relations"
2016	Aquarius	Steven Parent	2 episodes
2016–2017	Bizaardvark	Victor	2 episodes
2017	American Vandal	Alex Trimboli	Recurring role (season 1)
2017	Wisdom of the Crowd	Jake	Episode: "Trade Secrets"
2018	New Warriors	Robbie Baldwin / Speedball	Unsold TV pilot
2019	The Act	Nick Godejohn	Main role
2020	Utopia	Ethan	Recurring role
2021	Pacific Rim: The Black	Taylor Travis	Main voice role
2022	Pieces of Her	Jasper	Recurring role
2022	Reboot	Zack Jackson	Main role
2023	Party Down	Stuart Gluberd	Episode: "First Annual PI2A Symposium"

== Awards and nominations ==
Year	Award	Category	Work	Result
2004	Young Artist Award	Best Performance in a TV Movie, Miniseries or Special – Leading Young Actor	National Lampoon's Thanksgiving Family Reunion	Won
2006	Young Artist Award	Best Performance in a Short Film – Young Actor	When Jesse Was Born	Nominated
2008	Young Artist Award	Best Performance in a TV Series – Recurring Young Actor	Psych	Nominated
2010	Young Artist Award	Best Performance in a TV Series (Comedy or Drama) – Leading Young Actor	Stormworld	Won
2010	Young Artist Award	Best Performance in a TV Series – Guest Starring Young Actor 14 and Over	Flashpoint	Nominated
2010	Young Artist Award	Outstanding Young Ensemble Performers in a TV Series	Stormworld	Nominated
2010	Leo Award	Best Performance in a Youth or Children's Program or Series	Stormworld	Won
