= Danielle Chuchran =

American actress (born 1993)

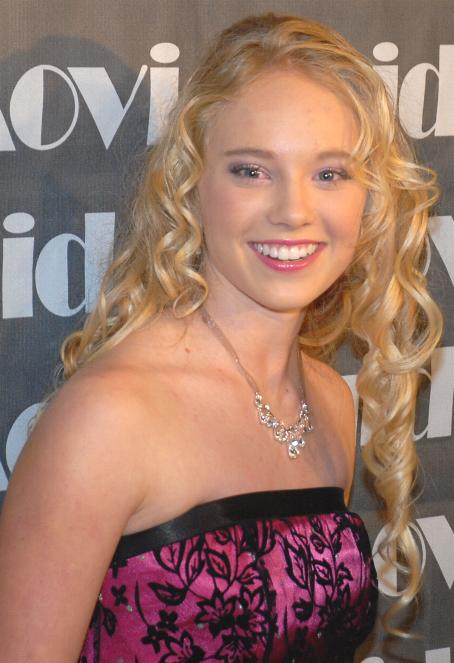
- Chuchran at the 2008 MovieGuide Faith and Values Awards Gala
- Born: Danielle Ryan Chuchran; June 9, 1993 (age 33); Upland, California, U.S.
- Other names: Danielle C. Ryan, Dani
- Occupation: Actress
- Years active: 2001–present

Danielle Ryan Chuchran (born June 9, 1993) is an American actress. She starred in the Christmas film Christmas for a Dollar as Verma and starred in the 2007 film The Wild Stallion (formerly Last of the Mustangs).

== Career ==
She landed her first two auditions and filmed two movies for the Church of Jesus Christ of Latter-day Saints. At the age of eight she co-starred in Little Secrets, a feature film with Vivica A. Fox, Evan Rachel Wood and Michael Angarano. Shortly thereafter she landed the role of Thing 1 in The Cat in the Hat feature. In 2007 she also starred as one of the children in Saving Sarah Cain as Anna Mae Cottrell.

Additional credits include the HBO movie Shot in the Heart and episodes of several TV series, among them Crossing Jordan, Girlfriends, Days of Our Lives and The District. On stage she appeared in the production of Elvis and Juliet, written by Mary Willard and directed by Ted Lange. She also appeared on The Bold and the Beautiful as a young Stephanie Forrester in flashbacks.

== Filmography ==
=== Film ===
Year	Title	Role	Notes	Ref(s)
2001	Little Secrets	Lea		
2002	Handcart	Rescued Girl (uncredited)		
2003	Dr. Seuss' The Cat in the Hat	Thing One		
2007	Saving Sarah Cain	Anna Mae Cottrell		
2009	Minor Details	Claire		
2009	The Wild Stallion	CJ		
2010	Hunger Games: Katniss & Rue	Katniss Everdeen	Short film	
2010	You're So Cupid!	Emma Valentine		
2010	Nemesis	Dani	Short film	
2011	Hunger Games: The Second Quarter Quell	District One Girl	Short film	
2011	Maximum Ride: Erasers and Max	Max	Short film	
2011	Scents and Sensibility	Margaret Dashwood		
2011	Snow Beast	Emmy Harwood		
2012	Abide with Me	Lucy	Short film	
2012	Osombie	Tomboy		
2012	12 Dogs of Christmas: Great Puppy Rescue	Emma		
2013	Christmas for a Dollar	Verna Kamp		
2013	Dragon Lore: Curse of the Shadow	Nemyt		
2013	Haunt	Sarah Asher		
2013	Courting Miss Lancaster	Athena Lancaster		
2013	Storm Rider	Dani Fielding		
2014	Survivor	Kate Mitra		
2014	Mochila: A Pony Express Adventure	The Rider	Short film	
2015	Fire City: End Of Days	Cornelia, The Interpreter of Signs		
2015	Riot	Alena		
2017	626 Evolution	626		
2018	22 Willowbrook	Dr. Brownstein	Short film	
2020	Finding Love in Mountain View	Margaret Garvey		
2021	Mistletoe Mixup	Holly		
2022	Double Threat	Natasha		
2023	Night Train	Holly McCord		

=== Television ===
Year	Title	Role	Notes	Ref(s)
2001	Shot in the Heart	(uncredited)	TV movie	
2002	The District	Sheridan Haskell	Episode: "Faith"	
2004	Girlfriends	Lily	Episode: "Good Catch or a Bad Hop?"	
2004	Crossing Jordan	Amanda	Episode: "What Happens in Vegas Dies in Boston"	
2005	Little House on the Prairie	Mary Ingalls	TV miniseries	
2005	Without a Trace	Melissa	Episode: "The Innocents"	
2006	The Bold and the Beautiful	(young) Stephanie	3 episodes	
2009	ER	Sloan	Episode: "And in the End..."	
2011	A Christmas Wish	Jeanie Bullington	TV movie	
2013	Body of Proof	Rebecca Banks	Episode: "Lost Souls"	
2014	Nowhere Safe	Ashley Evans	TV movie	
2015	Austentatious	Marianne Dashwood	TV miniseries	
2015	Love Finds You in Charm	Emma Miller	TV movie	
2016	Stalked by My Mother	Lucy / Gina	TV movie	
2018	Runaway Romance	Ann Stanway	TV movie	
2018	Driven	Tammy Taylor	Episode: "Part 5" (2018)	
2018	Criminal Minds	Portia Richards	Episodes: "The Dance of Love" (2018), "Starter Home" (2018), "Truth Or Dare" (2018)	
2019	When Vows Break	Lydia	TV movie	
2019	Magnum P.I.	Blair Newman	Episode: "Black is the Widow" (2019)	
2019	His Deadly Affair	Heidi Turner	TV movie	
2021	Love, Lost & Found	Claire	TV movie	
2024	A Greek Recipe for Romance	Abby	TV movie (Hallmark)	
