= The Wild Stallion =

- Film poster
- Directed by: Craig Clyde
- Written by: Craig Clyde
- Produced by: Holly W. Danneman; Bryce W. Fillmore
- Starring: Miranda Cosgrove; Danielle Chuchran; Connie Sellecca; Fred Ward; Robert Wagner; Paul Sorvino
- Distributed by: Myriad Pictures
- Release date: October 6, 2009
- Running time: 82 minutes
- Country: United States
- Language: English

The Wild Stallion is a 2009 American direct-to-DVD film directed by Craig Clyde and starring Miranda Cosgrove, Danielle Chuchran, Robert Wagner, Paul Sorvino, Connie Sellecca and Fred Ward. It was distributed by Myriad Pictures. In December 2010, the popular Horse Book Club PONY included The Wild Stallion in their package.

== Plot ==
Hanna Mills (Miranda Cosgrove), an 11-year-old girl from Cleveland, Ohio, wants to photograph wild horses for a project and to try to help save them. After visiting a ranch during summer vacation and befriending CJ (Danielle Chuchran), another 11-year-old girl, she learns about illegal activities that might jeopardize the mustangs. Along the way she learns about the horses including the legend of the black stallion.

== Cast ==
- Miranda Cosgrove as Hanna Mills
- Danielle Chuchran as C.J.
- Fred Ward as Frank Mills
- Manuel Ojeda as Jorge Valencia
- Connie Sellecca as Maddie
- Robert Wagner as Novak - The wild horse buyer
- Paul Sorvino as Sheriff Buck
- Corbin Allred as Depute Morg Haynes
- K. C. Clyde as Dallas Brody
- Gib Gerard as Ty Brody
- Carlisle Studer as Lilly
- RaeAnn Christensen as Ellie Reynolds
- Scotty Meek as Murdock
- Bob Lanoue as Virgil
- Michael Lawson as Alvin Niedermeyer - the cook
- Dustin Hunter Evans as Kyle

== See also ==
- List of films about horses
