= Andrew Jenkins (actor) =

Canadian actor and screenwriter (born 1988)

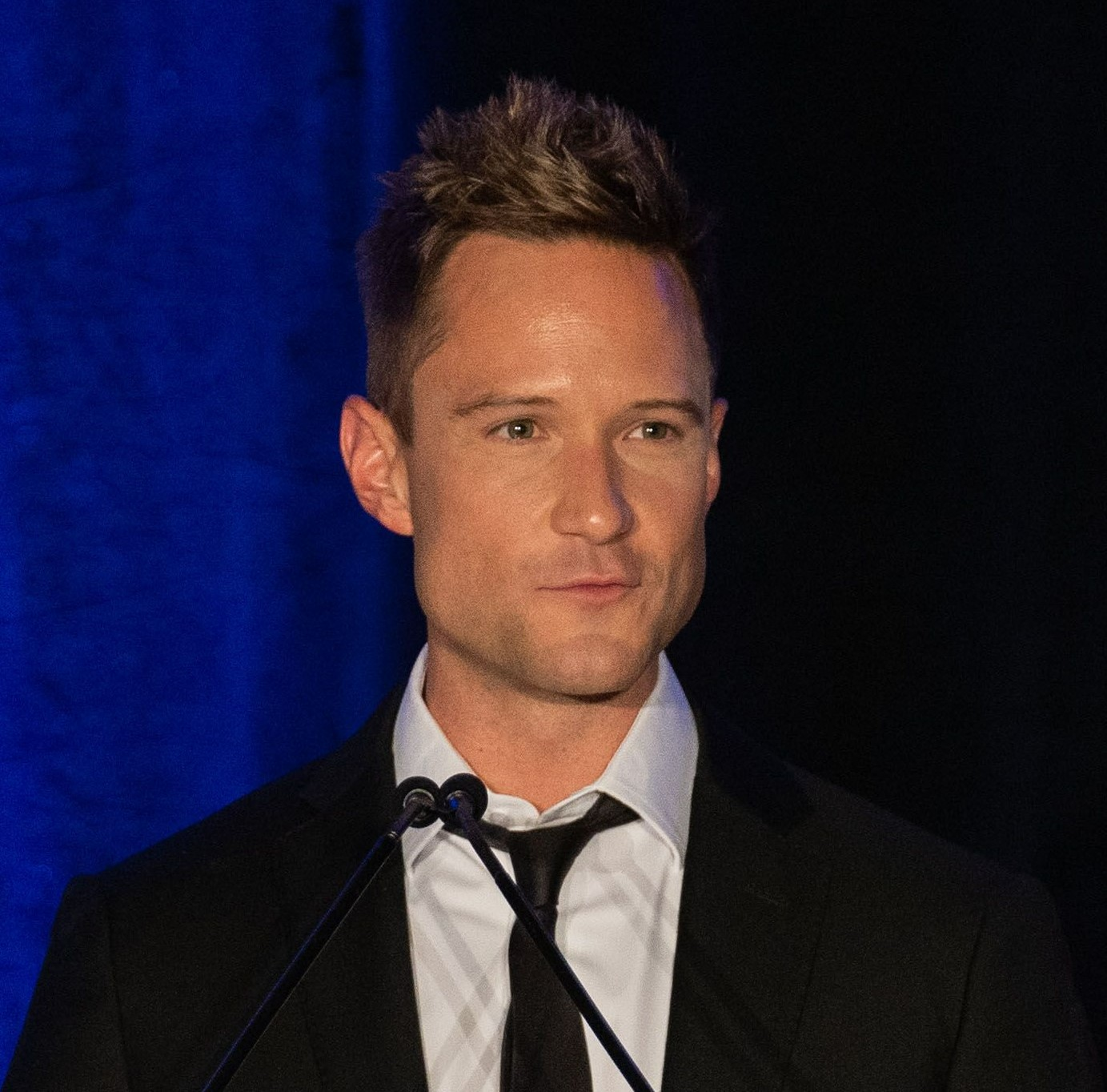
- Born: December 28, 1988 (age 36); Medicine Hat, Alberta, Canada
- Education: University of British Columbia, Wharton Business School, William Esper Studio
- Occupation(s): Actor, businessman
- Years active: 2007–present
- Height: 5 ft 10 in (178 cm)

Andrew Jenkins (born December 28, 1988) is a Canadian actor, screenwriter, producer, and entrepreneur.

== Early life ==
Jenkins graduated from the University of British Columbia’s Sauder School of Business, with a degree in Commerce and specialization in Entrepreneurship and completed executive education at the University of Pennsylvania’s Wharton Business School. He trained at the Esper Studio with William Esper in New York City.

== Career ==
Jenkins has appeared on stage, as well as in numerous film and television roles. His first on screen appearance was in the Saving Grace pilot episode in 2007. Two years later, he starred in the science fiction television series Stormworld (2009). In 2012, he played Scott in the indie film Locked in a Garage Band. In 2013 he had a recurring role as Cody in season 3 of The Killing. In 2015, he played Sir Percival in three episodes of Once Upon a Time. Andrew played Doug Pownall in nine episodes of the Freeform television series Siren in 2018 and 2019.

Teaming up with director Chris Scheuerman, he wrote, produced and acted in psychological thriller Lost Solace. The film premiered at Cinequest Film Festival in San Jose in 2016 and screened at the Cannes Film market where it sold in May, 2016.

Jenkins won the 2011 Young Artist Awards for his recurring role on Tower Prep. He also received two LEO award nominations for his leading performances in Stormworld and Lost Solace.

He was the CEO of zenGOT, an on-demand marketplace platform for home services until the company sold in 2020, and is on the executive team at IAP Career College, He is the founder and CEO of Next Generation Indie Film Awards, a not-for-profit organization that has honored filmmakers including Rian Johnson and Natasha Lyonne, and is executive producer of the organization’s annual galas. Jenkins is a partner and advisor at the Canadian solar energy company Energy Economics.

In 2022 Jenkins produced and acted in the two-person David Ives play Venus in Fur in Vancouver, British Columbia with Leah Gibson.

== Filmography ==
=== Film ===
Year	Title	Role	Notes
2009	Zombie Punch	Infobrat74	
2011	The Trailer Park Holiday	Gunner	
2012	Locked in a Garage Band	Scott	
2013	The Guerilla Picture Show	Jason	
2013	Nowhere But Here	Danny	
2014	Date and Switch	Country singer	Uncredited
2016	Lost Solace	Spence	
2016	The Orchard	Accordion player	
2017	Freefall	Ivan	
2018	The Predator	Lieutenant	Uncredited

=== Television ===
Year	Title	Role	Notes
2007	Saving Grace	Eddie Austin	Episode: "Pilot"
2007	Aliens in America	Rob	2 episodes
2009	Stormworld	Jason	26 episodes
2010	Tower Prep	Jeremy / Odin	2 episodes
2012	The Firm	Nate	Episode: "Chapter Seven"
2013	The Killing	Cody	3 episodes
2013	Supernatural	Peter Jenkins	Episode: "Slumber Party"
2015	Wayward Pines	Ted Laufer	2 episodes
2015	Once Upon a Time	Sir Percival	3 episodes
2016	Sandra Brown's White Hot	Deputy Scott	Television film
2016	A Time to Dance	Matt	Television film
2017	Imposters	Bobby	Episode: "Frog-Bikini-Eiffel Tower"
2018–2019	Siren	Doug Pownall	9 episodes
