= Saving Sarah Cain =

- DVD cover
- Directed by: Michael Landon Jr.
- Starring: Lisa Pepper; Tess Harper; Elliott Gould; Danielle Chuchran; Abigail Mason; Jennifer O'Dell; Whitney Lee; Soren Fulton; Tanner Maguire; Bailee Madison
- Theme music composer: Mark McKenzie
- Country of origin: United States
- Original language: English

Production
- Running time: 87 minutes
- Production company: Fox Faith

Original release
- Network: Lifetime
- Release: August 19, 2007

Saving Sarah Cain is a 2007 made-for-television drama film based on Beverly Lewis' 2000 novel The Redemption of Sarah Cain. The film premiered August 19, 2007 on Lifetime. The film is distributed by Believe Pictures and stars Lisa Pepper, Elliott Gould, Tess Harper, Soren Fulton, Danielle Chuchran, Abigail Mason, Tanner Maguire, Bailee Madison, and Jennifer O'Dell. The film was directed by Michael Landon Jr.

== Plot ==
Sarah Cain (Lisa Pepper), a thirty-something columnist at the fictional Portland Times in Portland, Oregon, has seen better days in her career. When her boss Bill (Elliott Gould) rejects her latest column, he reminds her that she once wrote great stuff about life, instead of the puff-pieces she's been writing, and if she doesn't produce good writing again, she's heading back to the news-writing department.

Sarah's cellphone rings while she's out to dinner with her boyfriend Bryan (Tom Tate), who is planning to propose to her. On the phone is Sarah's 16-year-old niece Lyddie (Abigail Mason), whom she has never met. Lyddie tells Sarah that her mother, Sarah's older sister Ivy, has just died of heart failure. Sarah hurries to Lancaster County, Pennsylvania for the funeral.

Many years prior, Ivy married a man who was a member of an Amish community; her choice to join that community made Sarah feel abandoned and caused ill feelings between the sisters. Prior to Ivy's passing, her husband was hit by a car and killed. The court insists that as Ivy's sole surviving relative, Sarah is the legal guardian of Ivy's five children, and if she doesn't take responsibility for them, they'll be put into the state's foster-care system. Members of the community protest: they want no outsiders to raise the children. Lyddie and Miriam (Tess Harper), an elder and friend of Ivy's, convince Sarah to stay overnight to figure out what to do. As the deadline for her column is that night, Sarah writes about her day's events while she's there and e-mails that to Bill as a last-resort column.

While at the hearing the next day, Sarah receives a reply e-mail about her piece: The readers loved it and want more. Sarah realizes an opportunity in the making, and decides to take the children back to Portland. While Lyddie stays in Sarah's apartment and does the housework, the four younger children try to fit in at school but are labeled freaks for their Amish garb. Caleb (Soren Fulton) quickly becomes a star on the wrestling team; Anna Mae (Danielle Chuchran) gains attention from boys after borrowing Sarah's clothing; and young Josiah (Tanner Maguire) hates it there. Only 6-year-old Hannah (Bailee Madison) is accepted on her first day of kindergarten.

Bill likes the attention that the stories about the Amish children have produced, but Sarah rejects further offers of having the column being solely about them, feeling bad about using the kids. Meanwhile, Madison (Jennifer O'Dell), Sarah's rival at the paper, discovers where the children attend school and sends a TV news team to one of Caleb's wrestling matches. The children discover what Sarah has been doing and feel betrayed, because they had believed she was truly concerned for them. Sarah admits to them that the situation has spun out of control, and the kids go off to bed upset. Bryan also expresses disappointment in her.

Sarah realizes what she has done and takes the kids back to the Amish settlement in Pennsylvania to assign them to the elders. As she's leaving the community, the children rush to catch up to her. When Sarah stops, Lyddie hands her a letter Ivy had written which contains her last wishes. Only then is the truth revealed: Ivy wanted Sarah to have the kids as an apology for breaking her heart, saying that they'd be "blessings to [her] as they were to me". Sarah changes her mind and decides to stay at the community with her nieces and nephews. The ending shows Sarah writing a book titled My Redemption. Bryan visits while on a business trip and brings her a piece of her favorite cheesecake as a reconciliation gesture, and they hug.

== Soundtrack ==
Film score by Various
- Genre: Christian

The soundtrack for Saving Sarah Cain features songs by Christian groups such as Point of Grace and BarlowGirl.

1. "Pie" (Three Days Grace)
2. "How You Live" (Point of Grace)
3. "Saving Sarah Cain Main Titles"
4. "Sea Shells"
5. "Farewell"
6. "Dishes are Never A Chore" (Mark McKenzie)
7. "Sarah’s Story"
8. "Love Letter"
9. "Nay!" (Josiah’s Tree Climb)
10. "Those Were Our Tears!"
11. "Here’s My Life" (BarlowGirl)
12. "You’re OK in Everyway" (Mark McKenzie)
13. "Five Amish Orphans"
14. "She Prayed For You Everyday"
15. "Don’t Leave Us"
16. "Prayer Changes Everything"
17. "You Carried Me" (Building 429)

== Home media ==
Fox Faith released the film to DVD on January 15, 2008.
