= Private (novel series) =

Novel series by Kate Brian

- Covers of three Private saga novels: the first book (center), the first prequel (left), and the spin-off.
- Private; Invitation Only; Untouchable; Confessions; Inner Circle; Legacy; Ambition; Revelation; Last Christmas; Paradise Lost; Suspicion; Scandal; Vanished; The Book of Spells; Ominous; Vengeance
- Author: Kate Brian
- Cover artist: Julian Peploe; Roger Moenks; Laurent Alfieri; C. Havemeyer; Andrea C. Uva
- Country: United States
- Language: English
- Publisher: Simon & Schuster
- Published: June 27, 2006– August 30, 2011
- Followed by: Privilege

Private is a series of young-adult novels by American author Kate Brian, beginning with 2006's entry of the same name. The books chronicle the rise of ambitious teenager Reed Brennan, the series' narrator, as she becomes a member of her new school's elite dorm—composed of a glamorous yet disparate group of teens known as the Billings Girls. As the series progresses, several matters surrounding mystery, morality, and romance arise.

Thematically, moral ambiguity is a prominent feature of Brian's work. Extreme cases of loyalty and antagonism are personified in characters such as Noelle Lange and Ivy Slade—to degrees that are sometimes questioned or denounced by the narrator. However, it is often only after the details of another character's background have been revealed that Brennan can understand what motivates them, which will occasionally leave her conflicted in her judgments. The series has companion works, set in the past and the future, which are dedicated to further exploring character. These novels include the Private prequel collection, which focuses on various figures, and the spin-off series Privilege, which follows the resourceful but disturbed Ariana Osgood.

To convey the story's tone, the series' art team was composed of select individuals with backgrounds in teenage popular culture and youth-oriented fashion. As a recurring visual theme, each cover from the central story depicts three young women on front, with a fourth featured a slight distance apart on the opposite side.

Debuts of Private novels have appeared on the New York Times Best Seller list. The publisher has also released e-book editions of the series and its spin-off. In May 2009, a Web series based on the Private novels was announced. A film adaptation began production at Warner Bros. in 2016, but was subsequently cancelled during development.

== Overview ==
The Private continuity is divided into three sets of novels: The original series, which covers present events; the spin-off Privilege, which takes place 1–2 years in the future; and the prequel collection, which is set during various points of the past.

The original series begins with the introduction of Reed Brennan, a savvy and ambitious honors student who enters the prestigious Easton Academy private school. Coming from a shaken family and a mundane everyday life, she is eager to explore the brand new setting that awaits her in Connecticut. Unexpectedly, the center of her fascination soon becomes a famed dorm known as Billings House and the posh girls who reside there—Noelle, Ariana, Kiran, and Taylor. In time, Reed pines to become a Billings Girl herself, and is faced with many tests and compromises along the way. As the series progresses, several additional characters and their histories are introduced and focused upon.

== Production ==
=== Conception ===
Vengeance, the series' final novel

Simon & Schuster backed Private with book displays in Barnes & Noble outlets and a promotional contest through CosmoGIRL! magazine, in which 20 winners would receive free copies of book #1. Brian has stated that the setting of the series was conceived by her editor at Simon & Schuster, while she herself chose a central focus. After a certain amount of consideration, the author decided that mystery would be the ideal center of her characters' environment.

When I sat back to think about what I wanted to do, I thought about the setting of a private school and all of that sort of tradition . . . it seemed like a great place to set a mystery. So that was basically where that all began. And then it just from there became, 'Who is my main character going to be? What does she want? Where are we going to get the mystery from?' Which just lends itself to the mysterious, untouchable Billings Girls, and they are definitely the center of the mystery, at least in the first four books. So that was basically it. It was pretty natural.

=== Art team ===
Model Kaila Wilson being prepared for a photo

The series' cover team was composed of individuals who have worked with teen idols and socialites. Graphic designer Julian Peploe—who previously worked on CD covers for the Pussycat Dolls, The Veronicas, and Brandy—is largely credited for the signature cover image depicting supposed antipathy between one girl and three others. Series photographer Roger Moenks had worked with Joss Stone prior to his being chosen to photograph the Private models. In addition, Mr. Moenks and co-photographer Laurent Alfieri had collaborated before working on Private, at some points taking photos of young businesswomen from around the world to illustrate a series of articles written by David Benaym for L'Officiel.

Stylist Christina Havemeyer has stated that when deciding what the models will wear, "I look for obviously what I think is going to be something that a teenage girl is going to gravitate toward." She has noted the significance of color and variety. "Mixing and matching is very important. . .you can buy something from the store that's brand new and you can mix it with your grandma's necklace from 1959. So it creates kind of a luxe, but young, youthful look."

Since premiering, the series has been worked on by other noted artists, including Alloy Entertainment's visual director, Andrea C. Uva.

=== Cover models ===
In mid-2009, the series' Web site revealed alternative covers for several of the previously released US editions. Of the original covers, the models appearing on the first book—who grace the next three installments as well—portray the following characters according to Kate Brian: Noelle (center), Ariana (left), Taylor (right), and Kiran (back cover). The identities of other characters to appear have largely been left unverified.

== Characters ==
Private has an expansive cast and a regularly changing hierarchy. As conflicts ensue, the series is marked by exits, arrivals, and social ascensions. Consequently, characters who are on supporting status reach new heights, and characters who hold prominent positions are faced with a variety of descents, ranging from quiet to scandalous.

Reed Brennan

The collected, curious protagonist, Reed is a brown-haired girl from Pennsylvania who enters Easton Academy for her sophomore year on a scholarship at the beginning of the first book. Her troubled family background and otherwise placid past makes her overly ambitious and docile when presented with exciting opportunities. Though gifted both academically and athletically, her first major aspiration at Easton is to get into Billings House, which holds the allure of great social privileges and respect. She manages to get the attention of the Billings Girls, and a series of initiations to test her credibility follows. She initially dates a rebellious boy named Thomas Pearson, who disappears in the first novel and is revealed to have died in the second. Later, she begins a longer romantic relationship with a fellow student named Josh Hollis. As the series progresses, she experiences several physical perils, emotional challenges, and personal surprises, leading her to realize that appearances can be deceiving.

Noelle Lange

Noelle is a brown-haired young woman who initially serves as 'leader' of the girls in Billings House. Fiercely loyal to her friends, she is the implied counterpart to Reed, being similarly skilled in lacrosse and soccer, and apparently coming from a shaken family of her own. However, her privileged upbringing tends to make her blunt and sometimes insensitive, as she enjoys intimidating other students as well as the Easton staff. She is shown to be overly self-confident to the point of arrogance, but very intelligent. According to some of her peers, she cannot live without drama in her life. Noelle possesses a long, red scar along her stomach, just above her hipbone from a childhood horseback riding accident. She has an unstable longtime romantic relationship with another senior named Dash McCafferty. As the series progresses, Noelle becomes Reed's best friend and ally. Later in the series, facts about Noelle's family are revealed and it is discovered that Noelle is Reed's paternal half-sister.

Ariana Osgood

Ariana is the quietest member of the group, possessing blue eyes, ethereal white-blond hair, and a penetrating stare. She is known for always having her nose in a book, and is considered to be Reed's first friend in Billings, as it was Ariana who introduced Reed to the others. Beneath her exterior, Ariana is eventually revealed to have darker issues as the series progresses. She becomes the lead character of the first prequel, Last Christmas, and the spin-off, Privilege.

Josh Hollis

Josh is a blond-curled Easton student who is known to be quiet and is also an artist who possesses keys to the frequented art cemetery. He soon becomes Reed's primary romantic interest. The two begin dating during Reed's first year at the school. However, Josh often shows his distaste towards the Billings Girls, and sometimes quarrels with Reed about her ties to Billings House. In Legacy Josh breaks up with Reed when he finds her with Dash. Then he starts to date Ivy Slade. By the end of Scandal, he and Reed are a couple again. However, halfway through Vanished Reed is forced to break up with Josh, because someone is holding Noelle hostage and is giving Reed tasks to win her life back. Josh is appalled at first, but then later realizes that it was the kidnappers doing and gets back together with Reed.

Kiran Hayes

The most glamorous Billings Girl, Kiran is a model with brownish-gold eyes, brown hair, and tan skin. She has extremely good sense in fashion, and is capable of turning people into superstar lookalikes. She is also known to be shallow and 'bratty' to others. Beneath the surface, Kiran is troubled by alcoholism, which can lead to repercussions for herself and the others. She becomes a secondary character following the completion of the series' first arc. She makes an appearance in the Privilege series, during which Ariana pushes a drunken Kiran off a bridge.

Taylor Bell

A brainy, sensitive member of the group who possesses messy dark blonde curls and blue eyes; Reed's first impression of her is of a "cherub." She claims to have a photographic memory, and possesses a sweeter and more innocent nature than that of her three friends, as she is often visibly sensitive to others' feelings. Like Kiran, Taylor becomes a secondary character following the completion of the series' first arc. In the third book, Taylor leaves Easton to go back to public school. It is later discovered in Paradise Lost that Taylor was intimidated into leaving Easton by Ariana.

Ivy Slade

A prominent antiheroine, Ivy Slade is a sassy and intelligent girl introduced in the fifth novel. During the series' second arc (books 5–8), she reveals a firm hostility toward all things associated with Billings House. She is described as a match for the Billings Girls in terms of beauty and glamour. However, she is the only character known to have declined an invitation to join the dorm. Eventually, Ivy and Reed form a truce in the interests of a common goal, leading to a friendship between the two. She finally fulfills her destiny and becomes a Billings Girl later in the series, at Reed's request.

== Halls of residence ==
Easton Academy is unofficially distinguished by a caste-like environment, socially divided by lower-, middle-, and upper-class dormitories.

The series' original Billings Girls

Billings House

An upperclassmen dorm for girls, recognized as the most prestigious of all houses in the series. Acceptance into Billings is granted by invitation only. The building carries a mixed reputation throughout the books; members are typically depicted as being socially and academically privileged, but several of the Billings Girls are also shown to engage in varying illicit and snobbish practices. Most are known for their beautiful physical appearances and their reckless partying. Furthermore, some are not above resorting to methods such as bribery, blackmail, and treachery.

At the end of Suspicion, when Noelle and Reed are arriving back at Easton after break, Billings House is gone.

Bradwell Hall

Bradwell is a dorm for freshmen and sophomore girls. In the first book, it is where Reed Brennan lives before being admitted into Billings Hall. It is also where Missy Thurber, Kiki Rosen, Lorna Gross, Diana Waters, and Constance Talbot reside before their eventual move.

Ketlar House

Ketlar is a dorm said to house several coveted boys throughout the series. It is the dormitory for senior and junior boys where Josh Hollis and Gage Coolidge reside, where Thomas Pearson lived in Private and Last Christmas, and also where Dash McCafferty lived in the first four books.

Drake House

Drake is a dormitory for upperclassmen boys, nicknamed "Dreck" because it is supposedly where all the unsavory boys at Easton live. Kiran Hayes at one point has a fling with a boy from Drake House and Reed is forced to publicly break up with him (for Kiran) on instruction of the other Billings girls. Marc Alberro, whom Reed becomes friends with in Ambition, lives here.

Pemberly Hall

Junior/Senior girls who fall short of reaching Billings reside in Pemberly. When Reed is kicked out of Billings in Revelation, she gets a single in Pemberly, right next to her former nemesis Ivy Slade.

Parker

Dormitory for upperclassmen girls, where some former Billings House girls reside after the destruction of their old home.

Hull Hall

Hull Hall is where members of staff reside. It is nicknamed "Hell Hall" by the students.

Gwendolyn Hall

Gwendolyn Hall was the original class building at Easton. It is now a condemned building mainly used for hook-ups. In Private, Reed and Thomas often meet there. It is burned down at the end of Legacy by the Billings Girls and other students who used a tunnel in its basement to sneak out to the Legacy party.

== Themes ==
The central themes in the Private series revolve around sociological matters such as conformity and elitism—particularly as they pertain to an outsider during the coming of age period. As Reed strives to become a Billings Girl, she enters a world of moral ambiguity that raises questions concerning how far the characters will go in matters of ambition and loyalty.

== Book releases ==
With the exception of the first Private novel, which debuted in Canada on June 27, 2006, releases of the US and Canadian editions have been simultaneous, generally followed by releases in the United Kingdom.

2008 saw the release of five books in the saga: three in the original series, the first prequel, and the first installment of the spin-off. Five novels were also announced for 2010: two in the original series, two in the spin-off series, and the second book in the Private prequel collection. In addition to release dates, the tables below account for The New York Times Best Seller list peak numbers.

Book #	Title	US release	UK release	New York Times peak
1	Private	July 1, 2006	February 5, 2007	N/A
Reed Brennan starts her sophomore year at Easton Academy. She meets Thomas Pearson and eventually the two start dating. She also observes the Billings Girls, the most popular girls on campus. Reed will do anything to fit in with them. The novel ends with Reed being initiated into Billings and Thomas' disappearance .
2	Invitation Only	November 7, 2006	July 2, 2007	N/A
The first continuation of the series, following Reed's ongoing journey as she discovers the fuller extent of what it means to be a Billings Girl, with the issue of blackmail entering the picture and secrecy becoming more prominent. Also, Reed finds out about an exclusive party called the Legacy and tries to find a way to get in. At the end, it is revealed that Thomas Pearson was murdered and his body has been found.
3	Untouchable	December 26, 2006	November 3, 2007	N/A
This edition focuses on the mystery surrounding the lost life of a major character. While dealing with the repercussions, Reed finds a new love interest, but is soon faced with an ethical dilemma as he becomes a suspect in the case.
4	Confessions	April 24, 2007	March 3, 2008	7
The fourth entry concludes Reed's first year at Easton, along with the series' first arc. Several revelations are presented surrounding the campus mystery of Thomas Pearson's murder.

Book #	Title	US release	UK release	New York Times peak
5	Inner Circle	August 28, 2007	June 2, 2008	3
The fifth installment marked a new beginning for the series, following the initiation of Reed's second year at Easton and giving greater prominence to supporting characters—namely Constance, Astrid, Missy, Kiki, and Lorna. The ambitious Cheyenne Martin rises to new heights on the social scene, putting her at odds with Reed due to differences over the fate of Billings House. Cheyenne is later murdered. Additionally, a newcomer named Sabine arrives at Easton, joining the campus conflicts.
6	Legacy	February 19, 2008	August 3, 2009	2
As life changes rapidly, Reed is promoted to Billings president—leaving her to reap the benefits of her new position, while being simultaneously challenged by the various duties and expectations it brings. A central focus of the book concerns Reed's increasingly troubled relationship with Josh. This matter is fueled by a number of factors, including her growing commitment to her new position, the return of Noelle Lange, and the romantic advances of Dash McCafferty, who flirts with Reed via email and eventually in person.
7	Ambition	May 5, 2008	August 3, 2009	3
After the dramatic events of the previous book, Reed, president of Billings, is now tasked with preventing her dorm from being shut down. As part of a deal with Headmaster Cromwell, Reed soon learns that she must raise 5 million dollars in only one month. During that time, the Billings Girls attempt to find ideas for a grand fund raiser. Also, Reed begins to find things such as black marbles and Cheyenne's clothes in her dorm room, leading her to suspect Ivy Slade—Josh's new love interest—of planting these artifacts.
8	Revelation	September 16, 2008	October 29, 2009	N/A
After being exiled to Pemberley after a video of her and Dash was spread to the entire school, Reed must grapple with becoming an outcast, being Ivy Slade's new neighbor, and getting back into Noelle's good graces. Above all, she is faced with finding Cheyenne's murderer before they come after her, or anyone else who she loves.

Book #	Title	US release	UK release	New York Times peak
9	Paradise Lost	February 24, 2009	October 29, 2009	N/A
Paradise Lost follows Billings Girls new and old on a vacation to St. Barth's. The story briefly touches upon the love triangle between Reed, Josh, and Ivy—now complicated by Reed and Ivy's budding friendship. While on vacation, Reed meets a popular young man named Upton Giles, who becomes her newest love interest. However, Reed's closeness to Upton sparks jealousy, and she eventually becomes the target of several stunts, ranging from harmless to dangerous.
10	Suspicion	September 8, 2009	February 4, 2010	N/A
Suspicion picks up where Paradise Lost left off. Reed is eventually rescued by Sawyer, and decides to stay on the island, despite the numerous attempts on her life. She is eventually kidnapped and left on a deserted island, where she remains for six days until Upton and the police arrive. She later discovers that the mother of a girl named Paige had attempted to murder her because of previous sexual relations with Upton. The book ends with Reed parting ways with Upton on good terms, and arriving back at Easton to find Billings gone.
11	Scandal	March 9, 2010	May 27, 2010	N/A
Reed returns for a new semester at Easton with new friend, Ivy Slade, and newcomers to the school, Sawyer and Graham Hathaway. The Billings Girls come back to find their house demolished, splitting them up and making them regular Easton students. Reed goes back into her room to find a mysterious gift. The gift contains a book outlining the rules of the Billings Literary Society (BLS), a secret society the women of Billings created a long time ago. Reed recreates it with Ivy Slade. Playing by the rules, they only allow eleven of the fifteen Billings girls in, creating a divide. The book ends with Noelle missing and a mysterious text message.
12	Vanished	August 31, 2010	Sept. 2010	N/A
Noelle disappears, and to get her back, Reed must comply with the demands of Noelle's kidnappers. Strange revelations about Reed's family are unveiled in the process.

Book #	Title	US release	UK release	New York Times peak
13	Ominous	February 22, 2011	March 2011	N/A
The Book of Spells is discovered by Noelle and Reed, and they begin unraveling the mysteries of magic with the rest of the Billings girls. Their lineage proves important as one by one, the Billings girls go missing, and Reed has strange dreams connecting the present with the past.
14	Vengeance	August 30, 2011	Sept. 2011	N/A
In the final Private novel, Reed receives mysterious messages from someone who opposes the rebuilding of Billings House. This is where the seniors graduate and a new beginning for Reed at Billings starts.

=== Prequels ===
Book #	Title	US release	UK release	New York Times peak
Prequel	Last Christmas	October 7, 2008	October 29, 2009	N/A
This prequel revisits Ariana Osgood during the events of her junior year, including her relationship with Thomas Pearson. Ariana is revealed to have issues with patience and insecurity. She also has a hard time controlling her anger. Ariana is also a bit obsessed with love, and kills Thomas's ex and another boy who had a crush on her after she mistakenly thought that he was stalking her. The book ends with the beginning of Private, when Ariana is eagerly awaiting the public announcement that she and Thomas are together. However, she is shocked and infuriated when Reed comes into the picture. It ends when Ariana wonders whether anybody would realize or care if Reed "suddenly disappeared."

Book #	Title	US release	UK release	New York Times peak
Prequel	The Book of Spells	December 21, 2010	February 3, 2011	N/A
Set in 1915, this prequel explores the history of Easton Academy and Billings House. Featuring fantasy elements, the novel follows a group of Billings Girls who discover the titular book, and attempt to use witchcraft to their advantage at school. The events of this story are initially referenced in Scandal.

=== Spin-off ===
Book #	Title	US release	UK release	New York Times peak
1	Privilege	December 30, 2008	Dec. 30, 2008	3
As with the first prequel, this spin-off also focuses on Ariana Osgood. The book follows her present life as she escapes from her mental institution and attempts to assume a new identity. Ariana goes after the wealthy Briana Leigh Covington, believing her to have killed her own father while framing Ariana's friend from the institution, Kaitlynn. After forming a friendship with Briana Leigh, she wavers on which of her friends she should remain loyal to. Ariana chooses Kaitlynn and kills Briana Leigh so she can assume the girl's identity. Kaitlynn later betrays Ariana after she frees her from the institution. Ariana feels guilty for what she did and fakes her own death using Briana Leigh's body.
2	Beautiful Disaster	June 2, 2009	June 2, 2009	8
Posing as Briana Leigh Covington, Ariana Osgood attends Atherton-Pryce Hall where she faces new conflicts such as fitting in with a new group of friends, competing in a school competition to win the right to live in the prestigious dorm, and fighting her attraction to Palmer, the boyfriend of her new clique leader Lexa. Kaitlynn Nottingham blackmails Ariana by threatening to reveal Ariana's true identity unless she pays her $1 million. Ariana manages to pay her with the money she steals from a school fundraiser. After cheating to win the school competition and inadvertently breaking up Palmer and Lexa, Ariana discovers that Kaitlynn created a new identity for herself so she could attend Atherton-Pryce Hall with her.
3	Perfect Mistake	October 27, 2009	Oct. 27, 2009	N/A
In the third book, Ariana, posing as Briana Leigh Covington, is shocked to find that her former cell-mate Kaitlynn is now posing as new student Lillian Oswald. Kaitlynn blackmails Ariana into getting invites to parties, secret clubs, and threatens to kill Ariana or one of her friends if she cannot complete her tasks. Ariana is determined to get rid of Kaitlynn, but cannot do it in fear of being found out. The book ends with Ariana failing to help Kaitlynn. And in return, Kaitlynn pushes Brigit down the stairs, killing her.
4	Sweet Deceit	June 8, 2010	June 8, 2010	N/A
In Sweet Deceit, Ariana, Kaitlynn, and a few of their friends are faced with tasks to complete while attempting to join a secret society. In a final confrontation, Ariana lures Kaitlynn into a trap and kills her, saving Lexa's life in the process. After the girls bury Kaitlynn's body, Ariana encounters a drunken Kiran Hayes, and pushes her off a bridge to protect her new identity.
5	Pure Sin	October 5, 2010	Oct. 5, 2010	N/A
Lexa becomes emotionally unstable while trying to keep the secret. Ariana receives Briana Leigh's inheritance, and enters a love triangle with Palmer and a fellow student named Jasper. The book ends with Lexa being hospitalized, while Ariana spots Reed Brennan in person.
6	Cruel Love	June 7, 2011	June 7, 2011	N/A
Ariana visits the hospital to check on her friend Lexa, where she finds Reed Brennan and decides to finally succeed in killing her. After Lexa decides to reveal the truth about their role in the murder of Kaitlynn Nottingham, Ariana kills Lexa. Due to this death, Ariana is nominated as president of her secret society. A counselor is brought in to talk to the students and help them through the tough time, who is Dr. Meloni, a man who knew Ariana in her former life. Ariana plots to kill him, while stalking Reed at Georgetown and deciding how to best kill her. When Ariana finally confronts Dr. Meloni and kills him, she is seriously injured and her blood is left at his murder scene. She tells her boyfriend Jasper that they must flee the country, and he plans to meet her at the airport. Ariana goes to Reed Brennan's dorm to kill her but fails and is instead shot by Reed in self-defense. Ariana is brought to the hospital where she cannot move, and sees Jasper, Noelle, and Reed. Jasper says he loves her, and Noelle chooses to side with Reed—holding Reed close until Ariana finally passes away.

== Reception ==
The series has been mostly well received among Brian's fanbase, while critical response has generally ranged from positive to mixed. After covering the first book, a review for Publishers Weekly stated that readers would "no doubt eagerly await the next installment," but also cited issues with characterization in the series opening. Comments in this regard have normally claimed that Reed is the only character who is initially well-developed, with Publishers Weekly remarking that "the Billings Girls themselves are stereotypical, but Reed is more complex than most of this genre's narrators." This matter remained under scrutiny as the series moved on, with a review from School Library Journal being generally neutral, claiming that the continued series includes "characters and situations that are interesting yet familiar." Children's Literature praised Brian's writing style for presenting "a very easy read, broken up into small chapters that allow the quick pace to carry the reader through."

In a survey conducted via the Website polldaddy.com, readers of the Private series voted Reed Brennan their favorite Billings Girl. Conversely, a more critical review from School Library Journal claimed that in the first book, several elements of her personality were left underdeveloped, including her apparent lack of ability to "empathize at all with her mother's pain-killer addiction."

There has been controversy regarding Brian's grasp of the characters' names and physical appearances. Throughout the beginning of the series, when the character of Kiki is first introduced, her last name is Rosen. However, her name is later switched to Kiki Thorpe. Additionally, the eye color of certain characters, including Josh Hollis, Thomas Pearson, and Ivy Slade, changes throughout the series. A critic stated in a review for Amazon.com that the appearances of many of the secondary characters, with the exception of a few, changes "with each new installment."

Throughout the majority of 2008, Brian posted first-chapter previews on her MySpace blog, which were regularly met with positive feedback. Beginning in December, the previews were moved to the series' official Website.

== Multi-media ==
=== Trailer ===
To promote the release of Inner Circle, Simon & Schuster teamed with the New York Film Academy in 2007 to produce an Internet-released live-action trailer for the novel. Written, produced, and directed by John Paschall, the short film is archived on Simon & Schuster's Website.

=== Fan campaign ===
In 2008, fans of Private began campaigning for the series to be adapted into a television program or feature-length film. This appeal was bolstered by the fact that the series' distributor, Simon & Schuster, is owned by CBS Corporation, and thereby associated with CBS and the CW Television Network. On June 10, 2008, Kate Brian posted a link on her MySpace blog directing readers to a fan-organized petition regarding a proposed TV series or motion picture. Following this author referral, activity on the petition saw a fast and drastic increase.

=== Web series ===
In May 2009, a live-action Web series based on the Private novels was announced, with a scheduled summer debut. A contest was also revealed, allowing female readers the chance to audition for the role of Kiran Hayes. Additionally, it was announced that the series would adapt the first four books via 20 episodes, each with a standard length of four to six minutes.

=== Cancelled film adaptation ===
In 2016, a film adaptation of Private began production at Warner Bros., with Stacy Rukeyser attached as writer. When asked about the film in November 2020, Rukeyser replied that Warner Bros had decided not to move forward with the project.
