= Minor Details =

- Directed by: John Lyde
- Written by: Sally Meyer; Anne Edwards
- Produced by: John Lyde; Leah Faber; Anne Edwards; Sally Meyer
- Starring: Kelsey Edwards; Caitlin EJ Meyer; Danielle Chuchran; Lauren Faber; Jennette McCurdy; Savannah Jayde Gipson; Emma Duke; Brady Edwards; Andrew Cottrill; Elijah Thomas
- Cinematography: John Lyde
- Edited by: John Lyde
- Music by: Brittnee Belt; Robert Allen Elliott
- Production company: Mainstay Productions
- Distributed by: SunWorld Pictures
- Release date: January 23, 2009
- Country: United States
- Language: English

Minor Details is a 2009 mystery film that was directed by John Lyde, based on a script written by Sally Meyer and Anne M. Edwards. It stars Caitlin EJ Meyer and Danielle Chuchran as two teenage girls who must help discover why a mysterious epidemic of sickness is starting to take over the school.

== Plot ==
Danforth Academy is an upscale boarding school where extremely wealthy families send their children. Four students, Abby, Paige, Claire, and Taylor, make friends with one another despite some initial misgivings and band together to solve the mystery of why students are falling sick after eating the cafeteria food. They believe that it may be someone targeting various groups at school such as the cheerleaders and soccer players, but cannot come up with a reason as to why this is happening.

They compile a list of suspects: the super-wealthy Mia, Riley, wacky Sean, the strange Professor Plume, and Emily, the intelligent daughter of the principal. Eventually, the students discover that the culprit is Mia, whose father owns a vending machine business. She wanted to attend modeling camp and used ipecac to trick everyone into thinking that the cafeteria food was contaminated in order to drive up sales to the vending machines, which are owned by her father.

== Cast ==
- Kelsey Edwards as Abby
- Caitlin EJ Meyer as Paige
- Danielle Churchran as Claire Barlow
- Lauren Faber as Taylor Williams
- Jennette McCurdy as Mia Maxwell
- Emma Duke as Emily Littman
- Savannah Jayde as Riley Jackson
- Brady Edwards as Brad
- Andrew Cottrill as Sean
- Steve Anderson as Professor Plume
- Susanne Sutchy as Principal Littman
- Elijah Thomas as Ethan
- Frank Gerrish as Sgt. Aimes
- Charan Prabhakar as Coach Johnson
- Danor Gerald as Oscar
- Clara Susan Morey II as Nurse Betty
- Christy Summerhays as Pauline
- Shauna Thompson as Shelly
- Joel Bishop as Tom
- Dakota Edwards as Ben
- Jennifer Klekas as Coach Hallows
- Tori Ramert as Samantha
- Colleen Baum as Elsie
- Samantha Endicott as Gracie
- Rachelle Faber as Janis
- Ruby Chase as Meena (as Ruby Chase O'Neil)
- Tatiana Galindo as Lindsay Pepper
- Whitney Lee as Vanessa Guss
- Sloane Endicott as Waitress

== Development ==
Filming for Minor Details took place in Utah Valley during 2008.

== Reception ==
Common Sense Media rated the film at 2/5 stars, stating that it was a "Ho-hum mystery/comedy for tweens". The Dove Foundation awarded Minor Details a "Family-Approved" Seal and wrote that it was "a charming funny mystery that will be enjoyed by the entire family".
