= Kieran Scott =

American novelist (born 1974)

- Born: Kieran Scott; March 11, 1974 (age 52); Montvale, New Jersey, U.S.
- Occupation: Author
- Writing career
- Pen name: Kate Brian
- Period: 2003–present
- Genre: Young-Adult
- Notable works: I Was a Non-Blonde Cheerleader; Private series
- Website: www.kieranscott.com

Kieran Scott (born March 11, 1974; also known by her pen name Kate Brian) is an American author of chick lit books as The Princess and the Pauper, Megan Meade's Guide to the McGowan Boys, The Virginity Club, Sweet 16, Fake Boyfriend, and the Private series. Books published under Scott's own name include She's So Dead to Us, I Was a Non-Blonde Cheerleader, which was nominated for YALSA's Teens Top Ten, Brunettes Strike Back, A Non-Blonde Cheerleader in Love, and Geek Magnet.

== Biography ==
Scott is from Montvale, New Jersey and was raised in Bergen County. She enjoyed cheerleading, singing, and acting when she was growing up. She graduated from Pascack Hills High School and attended college at Rutgers University with a double major in English and Journalism. She worked as an editor for four years before becoming a writer.

She resides in New Jersey with her husband and sons.

== Bibliography ==
=== The Cheerleader Trilogy ===
- I Was a Non Blonde Cheerleader (2005)
- Brunettes Strike Back (2006)
- A Non-Blonde Cheerleader in Love (2007)

=== The So Trilogy ===
- She's So Dead To Us (May 25, 2010)
- He's So Not Worth It (June 7, 2011)
- This Is So Not Happening (May 1, 2012)

=== Adult fiction ===
- Wish You Were Gone (2022)
- Regrets Only (2023)

=== Young Adult fiction ===
- Kiss and Tell (1998)
- Trust Me (1999)
- While You Were Gone (1999)
- How Do I Tell? (1999)
- The Dance (2001)
- Mary-Kate and Ashley: Sweet 16: The Perfect Summer (book 3) (2002)
- Jingle Boy (2003)
- The Princess and the Pauper (2003)
- The Virginity Club (2004)
- Megan Meade's Guide to the McGowan Boys (2005)
- Sweet 16 (2005)
- Lucky T (2005)
- Fake Boyfriend (2006)
- Geek Magnet (2008)
- Ex-Mas (2009)

=== Shadowlands series ===
- Shadowlands (2013)
- Hereafter (October 2013)
- Endless (July 2014)

=== True Love series ===
- Only Everything (2014)
- Complete Nothing (2014)
- Something True (2015)

=== Nonfiction ===
- Leonardo DiCaprio (1998)
- Ultimate Cheerleading (1998)
- Matt Damon (1998)
- I Was a Mouseketeer! (2001)
- Cameron Diaz (2001)
- Salma Hayek (2001)
- The Diary of Disney Vero Beach (2010)

=== Private series ===
- Private (July 1, 2006)
- Invitation Only (November 7, 2006)
- Untouchable (December 26, 2006)
- Confessions (April 24, 2007)
- Inner Circle (August 28, 2007)
- Legacy (February 19, 2008)
- Ambition (May 5, 2008)
- Revelation (September 16, 2008)
- Last Christmas: The Private Prequel (October 7, 2008)
- Paradise Lost (February 24, 2009)
- Suspicion (September 8, 2009)
- Scandal (March 9, 2010)
- Vanished (August 31, 2010)
- The Book of Spells: A Private Prequel (December 21, 2010)
- Ominous (February 22, 2011)
- Vengeance (August 30, 2011)

=== Privilege series ===
- Privilege (December 30, 2008)
- Beautiful Disaster (June 2, 2009)
- Perfect Mistake (October 27, 2009)
- Sweet Deceit (June 8, 2010)
- Pure Sin (October 5, 2010)
- Cruel Love (June 7, 2011)
