= Olivia Jade =

American internet personality (born 1999)

- Born: Olivia Jade Giannulli; September 28, 1999 (age 27); Los Angeles, California, U.S.
- Education: Marymount High School
- Occupation: Social media influencer
- Parents: Mossimo Giannulli (father); Lori Loughlin (mother)

YouTube information
- Channel: Olivia Jade
- Years active: 2014–present
- Genres: Fashion; make-up; vlog
- Subscribers: 1.84 million
- Views: 43.8 million
- Last updated: July 17, 2026

Olivia Jade Giannulli (born September 28, 1999) is an American YouTuber, and daughter of fashion designer Mossimo Giannulli and actress Lori Loughlin. While in high school, Olivia began a social media career on YouTube and Instagram. In 2019, Olivia Jade was a subject of the "Varsity Blues" college admissions scandal, which involved her parents paying over $500,000 and Olivia posing in faked photos claiming she was on the crew team to be admitted into the University of Southern California. As of 2026, both her YouTube and Instagram accounts have amassed more than one million followers.

== Early life and education ==
Olivia is a daughter of actress Lori Loughlin and fashion designer Mossimo Giannulli. Giannulli has an older sister, Isabella, and an older half-brother, Gianni.

In 2017, Olivia crashed her car while singing along to Stevie Wonder's "Signed, Sealed, Delivered (I'm Yours)" as she filmed herself with her mobile phone, prompting expressions of concern about her driving habits among her social media followers.

In 2018, Olivia graduated from Marymount High School in Los Angeles and enrolled at the University of Southern California. As of October 2019, both Giannulli sisters are no longer enrolled at USC.

=== 2019 college admissions bribery scandal ===
In 2018, according to an indictment by the United States Government, Olivia posed for a photo on an ergometer rowing machine. The photo was later submitted as part of her application to the University of Southern California (USC) with the implication she was a competitive rower, though she was not and had no interest in becoming one. At the same time, it is alleged, her parents paid $500,000 in bribes to a coach at the university to designate her and her older sister Isabella as athletic prospects for the team, enabling them to gain admission to the school. According to the federal criminal complaint against her father, Olivia was confused about how to complete the USC application, and an employee of the alleged conspiracy's ringleader ultimately had to fill it out on her behalf. Teen Vogue has reported that "it is undetermined if Olivia knew about the alleged scheme."

Before starting classes at USC, Olivia prompted criticism when she posted a statement to her YouTube channel in which she said, referring to her upcoming attendance at USC, "... I do want the experience of like game days, partying ... I don't really care about school, as you guys all know." According to Newsweek, Olivia had been actively advising on applying to university to her social-media followers days before federal agents arrested her parents on fraud charges for their alleged involvement in the conspiracy. On March 13, 2019, media sources reported that when news of the scandal broke, Olivia was in the Bahamas on Rick Caruso's $100 million yacht. Olivia is friends with Caruso's daughter Gianna, and Caruso is the chairman of the USC Board of Trustees. Olivia is featured in Netflix's film Operation Varsity Blues: The College Admissions Scandal that retraces Rick Singer's college admission scheme. The documentary recreates some wiretapped conversations obtained by the FBI between Singer and the many people he worked with and for, including Olivia's parents, Lori Loughlin and Mossimo Giannulli.

==== Repercussions ====
On March 14, 2019, two days after the scandal broke, Sephora distanced itself from Olivia, announcing that the company would be ending its makeup partnership with her. TRESemmé also dropped her as a sales partner. Some media outlets had reported that Olivia dropped out of USC due to fears of being "viciously bullied"; however, a university spokesperson later confirmed that Olivia remained enrolled at the school.

Olivia was subjected to public shaming, cyberbullying, and generalized ridicule through social and traditional media after allegations of the scandal surfaced. Olivia's social media platforms were inundated with critical comments and she ultimately disabled the comment features on her Instagram account. Slate writer Heather Schwedel said that Olivia checked "all the right boxes for ridicule", while comedian John Oliver, speaking on Last Week Tonight with John Oliver, opined that "death threats" were inappropriate but a limited period of joke-making at Olivia's expense would be socially acceptable. On December 2, 2019, Olivia returned to YouTube for the first time since the scandal broke in a video posted to her account titled "Hi Again." However, she did not address the scandal directly, saying in the video that she had been "legally barred" from doing so.

USC scheduled a hearing in March 2019 to determine if Olivia should be identified as a "disruptive individual", which could result in a lifetime ban from the university.

In October 2019, the USC Registrar confirmed that Olivia and her sister were no longer enrolled at the university, but the university said that because of student privacy laws it would not confirm whether the sisters were expelled.

== Career ==
In 2014, Olivia started a lifestyle YouTube channel. She then started an Instagram account. Each account has over a million subscribers/followers and were monetized through commercial endorsements and advertisements for Amazon, Sephora, and other companies.

Olivia appeared in a 2016 episode of the game show Tap that Awesome App, competing for a US$5,000 prize for charity.

In 2018, Olivia trademarked "Olivia Jade" and "Olivia Jade Beauty". Her applications had at first not been processed by the U.S. Patent and Trademark Office due, in part, to what media outlets described as "poor punctuation." Her trademark application was approved in April 2019.

In September 2021, Olivia was announced as one of the celebrities competing on season 30 of Dancing with the Stars. She and her partner, Valentin Chmerkovskiy, were the eighth couple to be eliminated, ultimately finishing in 8th place.
