= Mossimo Giannulli =

American fashion designer

- Born: Massimo Giannulli; June 4, 1963 (age 63); Los Angeles, California, U.S.
- Occupation: Fashion designer
- Known for: Mossimo clothing Varsity Blues scandal
- Spouse(s): Chris (divorced) Lori Loughlin (m. 1997; sep. 2025)
- Children: 3, including Olivia Jade

Mossimo Giannulli (born Massimo Giannulli; June 4, 1963) is an American fashion designer who founded Mossimo, a mid-range clothing company, in 1986; Giannulli sold this company to Iconix Brand Group in 2006, exactly twenty years after it was founded.

== Early life ==
Giannulli was born in Los Angeles to parents of Italian descent; Gene, an architect, and Nancy, a homemaker. He was raised in Encino, California. In the first grade, he changed his first name to Mossimo at the suggestion of a teacher who insisted it was easier to pronounce.

Giannulli is a 1980 graduate of Corona del Mar High School in Newport Beach, California.

Giannulli had purportedly studied business and architecture at the University of Southern California for three years before dropping out in 1987, however in the wake of the Varsity Blues scandal it was revealed that he only spent time at the university in 1984 as a non-degree-seeking student.

== Mossimo ==
Giannulli created Mossimo, a mid-range American clothing company, in 1986 on Balboa Island in Newport Beach, California. Mossimo specializes in youth and teenage clothing such as shirts, jeans, jackets, socks, underwear, and accessories.

During the company's first year it grossed $1 million. The following year, $4 million. The line expanded in 1991 to include sweatshirts, knits, and sweaters.

Mossimo's initial public offering occurred in 1996. Shares tumbled from $50 to $4 when Giannulli transitioned the company from streetwear and beachwear to high fashion. He then took the brand downscale, announcing on March 28, 2000, a multi-product licensing agreement with Target stores for $27.8 million. Mossimo was acquired by Iconix Brand Group in 2006.

== College bribery scandal ==
Giannulli and his wife Lori Loughlin were arrested on March 12, 2019, in connection with their involvement in a nationwide college entrance exam cheating scandal, regarding their two daughters' admission to USC. They were charged with conspiracy to commit mail fraud and honest services fraud and released on $1 million bail each. They were among 50 people charged. The couple were also charged with money-laundering in April 2019.

The couple's indictment alleged they paid a bribe of $500,000, disguised as a donation to the Key Worldwide Foundation, to get their two daughters into the university as rowing crew athletes, though neither had ever trained in the sport. Giannulli and Loughlin initially denied the charges and later pleaded guilty as part of a plea bargain.

=== Prison sentence ===
On August 21, 2020, Giannulli was sentenced to five months in prison and a $250,000 fine, and Loughlin was sentenced to two months and a $150,000 fine. The couple were subsequently expelled from the Bel-Air Country Club. Giannulli and Loughlin were required to report to prison by November 19. On October 30, 2020, Loughlin reported but Giannulli did not. The same day, visitation rights were suspended due to the COVID-19 pandemic.

Giannulli entered the medium-security federal penitentiary in Lompoc, California, on November 19, 2020, and was scheduled for release on April 17, 2021. Due to COVID-19 he was placed in a medium security isolation rather than a minimum security cell. His son, Gianni, posted on Instagram that the "mental and physical damage being done from such isolation and treatment is wrong." On April 2, 2021, Giannulli was released to home confinement. He was released from home confinement a day early on April 16, 2021, and remained on supervised release until April 2023.

== Personal life ==
Giannulli was first married to a woman named Chris, with whom he had his son, Gianni, in 1990.

Giannulli and Loughlin eloped in 1997. They had two daughters, Bella (b. 1998) and Olivia Jade (b. 1999). In October 2025, it was revealed that Giannulli and Loughlin had separated.

On September 4, 2026, it was announced that Loughlin had filed for divorce from Giannullo.
