= Lori Loughlin =

American actress (born 1964)

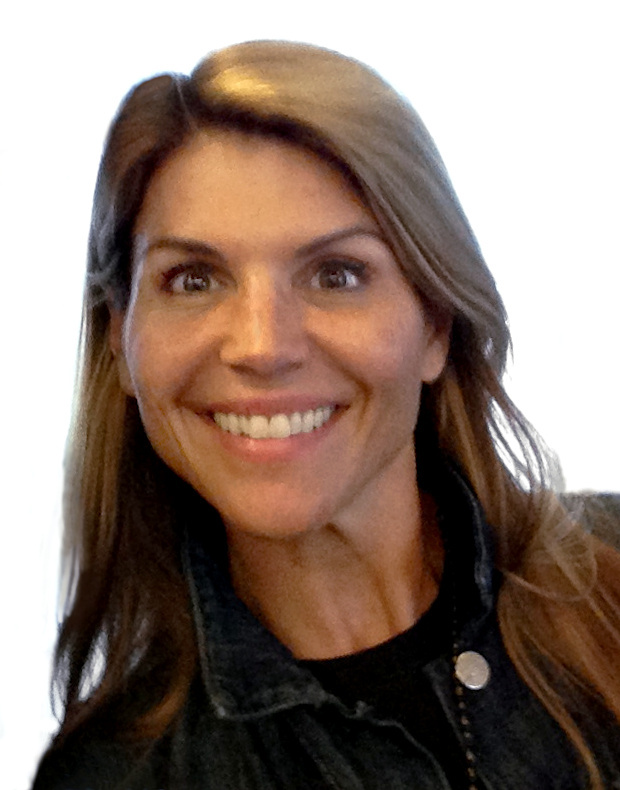
- Loughlin in 2014
- Born: Lori Anne Loughlin; July 28, 1964 (age 62); New York City, U.S.
- Education: Hauppauge High School
- Occupation: Actress
- Years active: 1979–present
- Known for: Rebecca Donaldson Katsopolis in Full House; Jody Travis in The Edge of Night; 90210
- Spouses: Michael R. Burns (m. 1989; div. 1996) Mossimo Giannulli (m. 1997; div. 2026)
- Children: 2, including Olivia Jade

Lori Anne Loughlin (/ˈlɒklɪn/; born July 28, 1964) is an American actress. From 1988 to 1995, she played Rebecca Donaldson Katsopolis on the ABC sitcom Full House and reprised the role for its Netflix sequel/spin-off Fuller House (2016–2018). She is also known for her roles of Jody Travis in The Edge of Night (1980–1983), Debbie Wilson in The CW series 90210 (2008–2012), Jennifer Shannon in the Garage Sale Mystery television film series (2013–2018), and Abigail Stanton in When Calls the Heart (2013–2019). She was a co-creator, producer, and star of the two seasons of The WB series Summerland (2004–2005).

In 2020, Loughlin and her husband, Mossimo Giannulli, pleaded guilty to conspiracy to commit fraud in connection with the 2019 college admissions bribery scandal. She was sentenced to two months in prison and was released in December 2020. As the case progressed, she lost acting and sponsorship roles, but after her release, she resumed her career and appeared in several television films and series, including episodes of Blue Bloods, Ted, and Curb Your Enthusiasm, and a recurring role in On Call on IMDbTV.

== Early life ==
Loughlin was born in Queens, New York, and moved to Oceanside, Long Island, when she was a year old. Later, her family moved to Hauppauge, New York. She has a younger brother, Roy, and the siblings and their father are of Irish descent. Their parents are Lorellee and Joseph Roy Loughlin, a foreman for the New York Telephone Company.

Lori Loughlin attended Oaks School No. 3 Elementary School in Oceanside and graduated from Hauppauge High School.

== Career ==
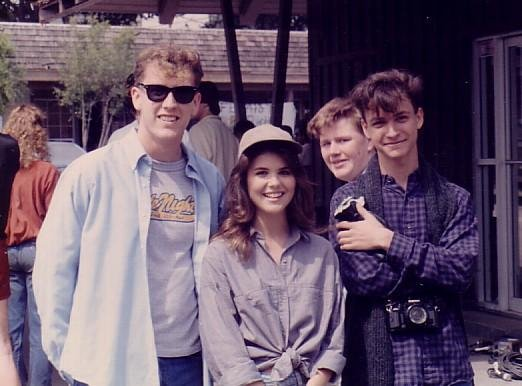
Loughlin at a 1986 shoot for the television film Brotherhood of Justice

Loughlin became interested in acting as a young child; she began her career at age 11 as a print model. She recalls:

My mom had a friend that was going into Manhattan to meet with an agency for modeling. She was taking her teenage daughters in and she asked my mom if I wanted to go along. My mom reluctantly let me go, but I don't think she ever thought anything would come of it... I went in and they handed me a contract and said, "We'll take you."

At 15, she was cast in an ABC soap opera, The Edge of Night, playing the part of Jody Travis, an aspiring dancer, appearing in the series from 1980 to 1983. From 1983 to 1988, Loughlin appeared in more than a dozen feature films and television guest spots. She starred in the 1986 BMX classic, Rad. From 1988 to 1995, she was cast in the ABC sitcom Full House as Rebecca "Aunt Becky" Donaldson, Danny Tanner's (Bob Saget) co-host, and later, Jesse Katsopolis' (John Stamos) wife. She was initially set to be in a six-episode arc but became a regular after becoming a popular character on the series. A few months after Full House ended, Loughlin co-starred with Tony Danza in the ABC sitcom Hudson Street (1995–96). It was canceled after a season.

In 1993, she starred in the television adaptation of Sidney Sheldon's novel A Stranger in the Mirror, a roman à clef on Groucho Marx and Erin Fleming, in which Loughlin plays Fleming's role. In 1997, she starred alongside Bruce Campbell in the film In the Line of Duty: Blaze of Glory. In 2000, she co-starred opposite Treat Williams in Critical Mass., a thriller directed by Fred Olen Ray. She also guest starred in Suddenly Susan, Spin City, Seinfeld, The Drew Carey Show, and as the superhero Black Canary in the Birds of Prey series in 2002.

From 2004 to 2005, Loughlin co-created, produced, and starred in The WB drama series Summerland. She played Ava, the aunt who parents three children after their parents die in a car accident. The series was canceled after two seasons due to low ratings on July 11, 2005. In 2007, Loughlin co-starred in the ABC sitcom In Case of Emergency with David Arquette. She appeared in the film Moondance Alexander (2007), co-starring with her former Summerland castmate Kay Panabaker. Loughlin also was in attendance at Comedy Central's The Roast of Bob Saget which was hosted by Stamos and premiered on August 17, 2008. At her table were Full House co-stars Dave Coulier and Jodie Sweetin. In 2010, Loughlin starred in the television film Meet My Mom, which premiered on the Hallmark Channel on Mother's Day. For the network, she most notably starred in the drama When Calls the Heart and the telefilm series Garage Sale Mystery before she was fired in 2019. On April 10, 2019, it was reported that When Calls The Heart would be returning after a production hiatus without Loughlin's character. She co-starred in seasons one through three of the Beverly Hills, 90210 spin-off 90210 as Debbie Wilson from 2008 to 2011. She reprised her role in the season five premiere episode in 2012.

Loughlin made a brief appearance as Aunt Becky, alongside Stamos as Jesse Katsopolis, on a July 2013 episode of Late Night with Jimmy Fallon, after a reunion performance by Jesse and The Rippers (Stamos' character's band on the show). In 2016, she guest-starred in an episode of Blue Bloods, and also began appearing as Rebecca in the Full House sequel series Fuller House from seasons 1 through 4.

As a result of her involvement in the 2019 college admissions bribery scandal, the Hallmark Channel terminated their on-going business relationship with Loughlin on March 14 and edited out her previously recorded scenes from the yet un-aired season six of When Calls the Heart. On March 16, Netflix dropped her from Fuller House, and technology firm Hewlett-Packard announced it would remove Loughlin and her daughter Olivia Jade Giannulli from its advertising. After pleading guilty and serving two months in prison, Loughlin was released in December 2020. She resumed her acting career, appearing in the late 2021 second season premiere of When Hope Calls on GAC Family, reprising her role as Abigail Stanton, her character from When Calls the Heart. She later appeared in other GAC original movies. Since then she has appeared in several television films and series, including another episode of Blue Bloods, "New York Minute," which aired on November 8, 2024. In the episode she again played Grace Edwards, the widowed mother of Louis Edwards.

== Personal life ==
Loughlin is Catholic. She married investment banker Michael R. Burns in 1989, and they divorced in 1996. On November 19, 1997, Loughlin eloped with fashion designer Mossimo Giannulli, the creator of the Mossimo clothing line, whom she met in 1995. They have two daughters, Isabella Rose and Olivia Jade, and Loughlin is a stepmother to Gianni, Giannulli's son from a previous marriage. Olivia has a YouTube channel and an Instagram, both with more than a million subscribers/followers as of 2024.

In 2020, Loughlin and her husband Giannulli sold their Bel Air, Los Angeles estate for $18.75 million to Tinder co-founder Justin Mateen. The home was built in 1929 and Harry Cohn, Johnny Hyde, and Charles Bronson previously lived there. In October 2025, it was revealed that Loughlin and Giannulli had separated after almost 28 years of marriage, but had not filed for divorce. Loughlin filed for divorce from Giannulli on September 4, 2026, with the news of the filing publicly announced four days later.

=== 2019 arrest ===
Loughlin and her husband Giannulli were indicted by the FBI and the U.S. Attorney for fraud and bribery offenses on March 12, 2019, in a nationwide college bribery scandal. The next day, Loughlin and Giannulli surrendered to federal authorities in Los Angeles. On May 22, 2020, Loughlin pleaded guilty to a count of conspiracy to commit wire and mail fraud, and her husband pleaded guilty to a count of conspiracy to commit wire and mail fraud in addition to honest services wire and mail fraud.

Sentencing took place on August 21, 2020. Loughlin was sentenced to two months in prison and Giannulli was sentenced to five months. She served her two-month prison sentence at FCI Dublin in Northern California from October 30, 2020 to December 28, 2020. At the time she was given a two-year supervised release, which expired in December 2022. She was also fined $150,000 and ordered to complete 100 hours of community service upon her release. Giannulli was fined $250,000 and ordered to complete 250 hours of community service. Giannulli reported to prison on November 19, 2020. On April 2, 2021, he was released to home confinement before completing his sentence on April 16, 2021. Loughlin's daughters were able to remain enrolled at the University of Southern California (USC) in Los Angeles.

Loughlin and Giannulli were named as defendants in a private class action lawsuit brought by Stanford University graduates, who alleged their education and degrees had been devalued due to their school's association with the case. The case was thrown out for lack of standing. Loughlin poked fun at herself bringing up the scandal in a cameo appearance in Curb Your Enthusiasm (Season 12, Episode 6, "The Gettysburg Address"), where having been sponsored to get into an exclusive golf club she then fakes having a disability, cheats during a game and uses bribes to get popular tee times.

== Filmography ==
=== Film ===
| Year | Title | Role | Notes |
|---|---|---|---|
| 1983 | Amityville 3-D | Susan Baxter | |
| 1985 | The New Kids | Abby McWilliams | |
| 1985 | Secret Admirer | Toni Williams | |
| 1986 | Rad | Christian Hollings | |
| 1987 | Back to the Beach | Sandi | |
| 1988 | The Night Before | Tara Mitchell | |
| 1997 | Casper: A Spirited Beginning | Sheila Fistergraff | Direct-to-video |
| 1997 | In the Line of Duty: Blaze of Glory | Jill Erickson | |
| 2000 | Critical Mass | Janine | |
| 2001 | Suckers | Donna Deluca | |
| 2006 | Farce of the Penguins | Melvin-Smacking Penguin | Voice, direct-to-video |
| 2007 | Moondance Alexander | Gelsey Alexander | |
| 2009 | Old Dogs | Amanda | |
| 2013 | Crawlspace | Susan Gates | |

=== Television ===
| Year | Title | Role | Notes |
|---|---|---|---|
| 1980–1983 | The Edge of Night | Jody Travis | Regular role: June 1980 to December 1983 |
| 1982 | Matt Houston | Sue Landa | Episode: "Shark Bait" |
| 1983 | The Tom Swift and Linda Craig Mystery Hour | Linda Craig | Television film |
| 1985 | North Beach and Rawhide | Candy Cassidy | Television film (CBS) |
| 1986 | Brotherhood of Justice | Christie | Television film (ABC) |
| 1986–1987 | The Equalizer | Jenny Morrow | 2 episodes: "Prelude" and "First Light" |
| 1986, 1988 | CBS Schoolbreak Special | Kelly, Sally | 2 episodes |
| 1987 | A Place to Call Home | Jenny Gavin | Television film (CBS) |
| 1988 | CBS Summer Playhouse | Tammy | Episode: "Old Money" |
| 1988 | Great Performances | Kay Cork | 2 episodes |
| 1988–1995 | Full House | Rebecca Katsopolis | Recurring role: season 2; main role: seasons 3–8. 150 episodes |
| 1992 | Doing Time on Maple Drive | Allison | Television film (Fox) |
| 1992 | To Grandmother's House We Go | Win-O-Lotto Lottery Hostess | Television film (ABC) |
| 1993 | Empty Cradle | Jane Morgan | Television film (ABC) |
| 1993 | A Stranger in the Mirror | Jill Castle | Television film (ABC) |
| 1994 | One of Her Own | Toni Stroud | Television film (ABC) |
| 1995 | Abandoned and Deceived | Gerri Jensen | Television film (ABC) |
| 1995–1997 | Hudson Street | Melanie Clifford | Main role |
| 1995–1997 | Tell Me No Secrets | Jess Koster | Television film (ABC) |
| 1995–1997 | In the Line of Duty: Blaze of Glory | Jill Erickson | Television film (NBC) |
| 1995–1997 | The Larry Sanders Show | Herself | Episode: "The Prank" |
| 1995–1997 | Suddenly Susan | Paula | Episode: "With Friends Like These" |
| 1995–1997 | The Price of Heaven | Leslie | Television film |
| 1995–1997 | Seinfeld | Patty | Episode: "The Serenity Now" |
| 1997 | Medusa's Child | Dr. Linda McCoy | Television film (ABC) |
| 2001 | Cursed | Natalie Keith | Episode: "... And Then They Tried to Make Some Rules" |
| 2001 | Spin City | Michelle | 3 episodes |
| 2002 | Birds of Prey | Carolyn Lance / Black Canary | Episode: "Sins of the Mother" |
| 2002 | The Drew Carey Show | Robin | 2 episodes |
| 2002 | Eastwick | Sukie Ridgemont | Television film |
| 2004 | Justice League Unlimited | Dr. Tracy Simmons | Voice, episode: "The Greatest Story Never Told" |
| 2004–2005 | Summerland | Ava Gregory | Lead role |
| 2005 | Missing | Dr. Joy Gribben | Episode: "Anything for Baby" |
| 2006 | Jake in Progress | Lindsay | Episode: "The Two Jakes" |
| 2006 | Ghost Whisperer | Christine Greene | Episode: "Demon Child" |
| 2007 | In Case of Emergency | Dr. Joanna Lupone | Main role |
| 2008–2012 | 90210 | Debbie Wilson | Main role: seasons 1–3 |
| 2010 | Soldier Love Story | Dana Marshall | Television film (Hallmark) |
| 2013 | A Mother's Rage | Rebecca Mayer | Television film |
| 2013 | Psych | Dr. Joan Diamond | Episode: "Nip and Suck It" |
| 2013 | Major Crimes | Rebecca Slater | Episode: "The Deep End" |
| 2013 | Addicts Anonymous | Mrs. Goldberg | Episode: "Choices" |
| 2013–2020; 2026 | Garage Sale Mystery | Jennifer Shannon | Television film series (Hallmark Movies & Mysteries) |
| 2013–2019; 2026 | When Calls the Heart | Abigail Stanton | Main role, seasons 1–6, guest season 13; 14 (pre-production) and pilot movie |
| 2014 | The Neighbors | Tina Giannulli | Episode: "High School Reunion" |
| 2014 | Enlisted | Herself | Episode "Alive Day" |
| 2015 | Northpole: Open for Christmas | Mackenzie Warren | Television film (Hallmark) |
| 2016, 2024 | Blue Bloods | Grace Edwards | 2 episodes |
| 2016 | Every Christmas Has a Story | Kate Harper | Television film (Hallmark) |
| 2016–2018 | Fuller House | Rebecca Katsopolis | Recurring role: 13 episodes |
| 2018 | Homegrown Christmas | Maddie Finley | Television film (Hallmark) |
| 2021 | When Hope Calls | Abigail Stanton | Main role; 2 episodes |
| 2023 | Fall Into Winter | Kerrie Murphy | Television film (Great American Family) |
| 2023 | Blessings of Christmas | Mandy Gilmore | Television film (Great American Family) |
| 2024 | Ted | Herself | 1 episode; archive footage |
| 2024 | Curb Your Enthusiasm | Herself | 1 episode; "The Gettysburg Address" |
| 2025 | On Call | Lieutenant Bishop | Main role; 8 episodes |
| 2026 | What If Christmas | Erin Shaw | Television film (Hallmark) |

== Awards and nominations ==
| Year | Association | Category | Nominated work | Result | Ref. |
|---|---|---|---|---|---|
| 1987 | Young Artist Awards | Michael Landon Award | CBS Schoolbreak Special | Won | |
| 1989 | Daytime Emmy Awards | Outstanding Performer in a Children's Special | CBS Schoolbreak Special | Nominated | |
| 2006 | PRISM Awards | Best Performance in a Drama Series Storyline | Summerland | Won | |
| 2009 | Teen Choice Awards | Choice TV Parental Unit | 90210 | Nominated | |
