= David Sidoo =

Canadian businessman (born 1959)

- Born: July 10, 1959 (age 67)
- Education: University of British Columbia
- Occupations: stock promoter, businessman, philanthropist, Canadian football player
- Website: www.davidsidoo.com

David Sidoo (born July 10, 1959) is a Canadian stock promoter, businessman, philanthropist, and former Canadian football player. Sidoo played for the University of British Columbia Thunderbirds, and is an inductee in the UBC Sports Hall of Fame and the BC Football Hall of Fame. David Sidoo was inducted into the University of British Columbia (UBC) Football Frank Gnup Wall of Honour in the athlete category in 2019. The Wall of Honour recognizes the outstanding contributions and achievements of UBC Football players, coaches, and builders. Sidoo, a former UBC Thunderbirds defensive back, was also named one of the UBC Football Top 100 Players of All-Time.

In 2019, the FBI named Sidoo as one of several parent perpetrators in the 2019 college admissions bribery scandal, and he later pleaded guilty to mail fraud conspiracy. On July 15, 2020, Sidoo was sentenced to 90 days in prison, one year supervised release and a $250,000 fine.

== Early life ==
Sidoo is of Indian-Canadian descent and grew up in New Westminster, B.C., the son of a sawmill-working immigrant father from Punjab in northern India and a stay-at-home mother. From 1978 to 1982, he attended the University of British Columbia on a football scholarship. At UBC, he played for the school's team, the Thunderbirds.

After graduating university, Sidoo was drafted into the Canadian Football League, becoming the first Indian-Canadian to have been drafter by a CFL team. He played professional football in the CFL for the Saskatchewan Roughriders and BC Lions from 1983 to 1988.

After retiring from football, Sidoo started working in the field of brokerage. Sidoo later was one of the founding members who sold an energy company, American Oil & Gas, to the Hess Corporation. At the start of 2016, Sidoo was the CEO of Advantage Lithium, a mining company. In 2019 Sidoo sold Advantage Lithium to Orocobre now called Allkem in an all-stock transaction.

=== University football career ===
David Sidoo's playing career at UBC started in 1978 spanning five memorable years. This was followed by a career in the CFL and in the 2000s, an influential and successful builder of sport at UBC. With the completion of the 1980 season, Sidoo was voted UBC football's Most Valuable Player. He was also selected to the Canada West All-Star team for three consecutive years, 1980, 1981 and 1982. Sidoo was selected not only for his work on special teams but also for his excellent play as a defensive back.

In 1981, Sidoo was selected the Shrum Bowl Defensive Player of the Game and in addition was awarded the prestigious Tom Pate Memorial Scholarship. This scholarship is given annually by the Canadian Football League to a student athlete who embodies the qualities of outstanding sportsmanship, contribution to his team and contribution to his community.

Heading into the 1982 season Sidoo held two UBC career records; most kickoff return yardage and most punt return yardage, two career marks that were later broken by Laurent DesLauriers. Sidoo set a UBC playoff record this season, returning a kickoff 96 yards against Manitoba. In 1982, Sidoo helped captain UBC's football team to its first Vanier Cup victory. This same 1982 season Sidoo was selected to the All-Canadian Team as a safety–one of six Thunderbirds to make the All-Canadian Team that season. In a career spanning 1978–1982, Sidoo totaled 1054 yards in punt returns and 731 yards in kickoff returns. In ‘81 and ‘82 alone, he recorded 8 interceptions for 96 yards.

=== Pro football career ===
David Sidoo was drafted 46th overall by the BC Lions in the 1982 CFL Draft. Sidoo would go on to sign and play for the Saskatchewan Roughriders for a significant part of his pro football career as well as become the first Indo-Canadian player to play in the CFL. After signing with the Roughriders, Sidoo gifted his $5,000 signing bonus to his mom to help her pay her mortgage after his father died. Sidoo found success on the football field with the Roughriders accumulating 8 interceptions for 89 yards. In 1988 he signed with the BC Lions where he would finish out his pro football career and enter into the start of what would be a successful career as a businessman and philanthropist.

== Philanthropy ==
Sidoo is known for his philanthropic work in British Columbia, through his personal contributions and the charitable organisations founded by his family through their various business ventures. In recognition of his charitable work, Sidoo received the Order of British Columbia, Queen Elizabeth II Diamond Jubilee Medal, and the Non-Resident Indian Award in 2012.

In 2015, Sidoo created the 13th Man Foundation supporting the UBC Football program. The 13th Man Foundation is dedicated to providing student-athletes of UBC with exceptional athletic and academic opportunities. In 2015 the foundation donated $800,000 to set up the UBC Football Academic Centre. Located just steps away from Thunderbird Stadium, the UBC Football Academic Centre provides a space for all players to receive academic tutoring and advising. With more than 1,800-square-feet of multi-functional space, the centre is also used for team meetings, game preparation and academic supervision. The facility will help ensure the success of current players and serve as an essential tool in the recruitment of top student-athletes who visit the Point Grey campus in hopes of suiting up for the Thunderbirds Football program.

The Sidoo Family Athletics Endowment, which dispenses aid to student athletes, is the largest of its kind at UBC, where Sidoo served on the board of governors.

== Legal issues ==
=== College admissions bribery ===
In March 2019, Sidoo was named as one of the alleged parent perpetrators of the 2019 college admissions bribery scandal. Multiple sources reported on allegations Sidoo had paid money to illegally aid his two sons in getting accepted into American colleges.

As alleged in the FBI indictment, Sidoo paid $100,000 to have a test-taker impersonate his older son, so that the latter's SAT test scores were improved. The scores were sent to Chapman University, which his son later attended. According to the FBI, Sidoo paid an additional $100,000 to have his younger son's test taken in the same, fraudulent way. Citing the FBI indictment, CBC News later reported that Sidoo had also paid a test-taker to fake a high school exam on behalf of his son in 2012. The affected scores were sent to Yale, Georgetown and the University of California, Berkeley, the latter of which his younger son eventually attended. The FBI indictment noted that Sidoo had been in contact with other perpetrators of the college admission scandal in 2018, and in October of that year recorded a phone call in which Sidoo discussed obtaining a GMAT score for his older son, who intended to apply to business school.

Sidoo pleaded not guilty before a federal court in Massachusetts on 15 March 2019. In light of the 2019 college admissions bribery scandal, Sidoo stepped down as the CEO of Advantage Lithium, East West Petroleum, and Seaway Energy Services. Sidoo also resigned as a director of American Helium, Meridius Resources Ltd., Liberty Defense Holdings Ltd., and National Green Biomed Ltd. in mid-March 2019.

Sidoo pleaded guilty to fraud in the aforementioned matter on March 13, 2020. The sentencing took place on July 15, 2020, and he was sentenced to 90 days in prison, one year supervised release and a $250,000 fine. Sidoo spent the first 14 days in solitary confinement under pandemic quarantine procedures. Sidoo reported to SeaTac Federal Detention Center on September 23, 2020 and was released on December 17, 2020.

Sidoo asked that his name be removed from the University of British Columbia football field. Sidoo's appointment to the Order of British Columbia in 2016 was rescinded on June 12, 2020. Sidoo is the first person to be stripped of the Order. Sidoo withdrew as a member of the B.C. Sports Hall of Fame on July 31, 2020. Sidoo is inadmissible to the United States as a result of the felony conviction.

=== SEC fraud complaint ===
In April 2022, the U.S. Securities and Exchange Commission named Sidoo in a complaint, alleging his involvement in a pump and dump scheme with Ronald Bauer.
