= 2019 college admissions bribery scandal =

Corruption scandal involving US universities' admissions practices

Varsity Blues scandal
- Duration: 2011–2018
- Venue: United States District Court for the District of Massachusetts
- Location: United States
- Also known as: Operation Varsity Blues
- First reporter: Jennifer Levitz; Melissa Korn
- Organized by: William Rick Singer via: Key Worldwide Foundation; The Edge College & Career Network
- Accused: 53
- Charges: Felony conspiracy to commit: • Mail fraud; • Honest services mail fraud; • Money laundering

Operation Varsity Blues was the code name for the investigation into the 2019 criminal conspiracy scandal to influence undergraduate admissions decisions at several top American universities.

United States federal prosecutors made the investigation and related charges public on March 12, 2019. At least 53 people have been charged as part of the conspiracy, several of whom pled guilty. Thirty-three parents of college applicants were accused of paying more than US$25 million between 2011 and 2018 to William Rick Singer, organizer of the scheme, who used part of the money to fraudulently inflate entrance exam test scores and bribe college officials. Of the 32 parents named in a Federal Bureau of Investigation affidavit filed in U.S. District Court in Boston, more than half had apparently paid bribes to have their children enrolled at the University of Southern California (USC).

Singer controlled the two firms involved in the scheme, Key Worldwide Foundation and The Edge College & Career Network (also known as "The Key"). He pled guilty and cooperated with the Federal Bureau of Investigation (FBI) in gathering incriminating evidence against co-conspirators. He said he unethically facilitated college admission for children in more than 750 families. Singer faced up to 65 years in prison, and a fine of $1.25 million. In January 2023, he was sentenced to three and a half years in prison plus forfeiture of over $10 million. He was released from prison in August 2024.

Prosecutors in the Office of the U.S. Attorney for the District of Massachusetts, led by United States Attorney Andrew Lelling, unsealed indictments and complaints for felony conspiracy to commit mail fraud and honest services mail fraud against 50 people, including Singer, who has been "portrayed [...] as a criminal mastermind", university staff he bribed, and parents who were alleged to have used bribery and fraud to secure admission for their children to 11 universities. Among the accused parents are prominent businesspeople and well-known actors. Those charges have a maximum term of 20 years in prison, supervised release of three years, and a $250,000 fine. One month later, 16 of the parents were also indicted by prosecutors for alleged felony conspiracy to commit money laundering. This third charge has a maximum sentence of 20 years in prison, a supervised release of three years, and a $500,000 fine.

The investigation's name, Operation Varsity Blues, comes from a 1999 film of the same name. The case is the largest of its kind to be prosecuted by the U.S. Department of Justice.

== Discovery and charges ==
The Federal Bureau of Investigation (FBI) alleged that beginning in 2011, 33 parents of high school students conspired with other people to use bribery and other forms of fraud to illegally arrange to have their children admitted to top colleges and universities. Authorities became aware of the scheme around April 2018 when Los Angeles businessman Morrie Tobin, who was under investigation in an unrelated case for alleged pump-and-dump conspiracy and securities fraud, offered information in exchange for leniency in the previously existing, unrelated case.

Tobin, who had attended but not graduated from Yale University, told authorities that the Yale women's soccer head coach, Rudolph "Rudy" Meredith, had asked him for $450,000 in exchange for helping his youngest daughter gain admission to the school. As part of his cooperation with the FBI, Tobin wore a recording device while talking to Meredith in a Boston hotel on April 12, 2018; Meredith subsequently agreed to cooperate with the authorities and led them to Singer. Meredith pleaded guilty as part of his cooperation with the prosecution. Tobin was not charged in this case, but in February 2019, he pleaded guilty in the unrelated securities fraud case. United States Federal Sentencing Guidelines, to which judges often refer when deciding sentences, call for between eight and ten years behind bars. According to The Wall Street Journal, Vanity Fair, and CBS, prosecutors recommended 36 months of supervised release. In addition, Tobin agreed to forfeit $4 million as part of his plea deal. Tobin was sentenced to one year and one day in prison.

On March 12, 2019, federal prosecutors in Boston unsealed a criminal complaint charging 50 people with conspiracy to commit felony mail fraud and honest services mail fraud in violation of Title 18 United States Code, Section 1349. Those charges have a maximum term of 20 years in prison, supervised release of three years, and a $250,000 fine. The charges were announced by Andrew Lelling, United States Attorney for the District of Massachusetts. Assistant U.S. Attorneys Eric Rosen, Justin O'Connell, Leslie Wright, and Kristen Kearney of the securities and financial fraud unit were assigned as prosecutors of the case. FBI special agent Laura Smith signed the 204-page affidavit in support of the charges.

On April 9, 16 of the original 33 charged parents (Lori Loughlin, her husband Mossimo Giannulli, Gamal Aziz, Douglas Hodge, Bill McGlashan, Diane and Todd Blake, I-Hsin "Joey" Chen, Michelle Janavs, Elizabeth and Manuel Henriquez, Elisabeth Kimmel, Marci Palatella, John B. Wilson, Homayoun Zadeh and Robert Zangrillo), who had not pleaded guilty to the original charges, were additionally charged with conspiracy to commit money laundering by federal prosecutors in Boston in a superseding indictment. The indictment added those defendants to an existing case against David Sidoo, another of the 33 parents, that was already pending before Judge Nathaniel Gorton. The indictment alleged that the parents engaged in a conspiracy to launder bribes paid to Singer "by funneling them through Singer's purported charity and his for-profit corporation." This third charge has a maximum sentence of 20 years in prison, supervised release of three years, and a $500,000 fine.

Two parents in the scandal, Gamal Aziz and John B. Wilson, did not settle and went to trial. In October 2021, they were both convicted of fraud and bribery conspiracy charges. In February 2022, the two parents were sentenced, respectively, to 12 months and 15 months in jail as well as fines and community service. Both parents appealed their convictions.

On May 10, 2023, the First Circuit vacated all of Aziz's and many of Wilson's convictions. The appellate court found that prosecutors had read honest services fraud too broadly and that universities did not have a property interest in admissions slots. It also found that neither defendant could reasonably be understood to be in a conspiracy with the other USC parents, which is how the government chose to indict this case. The court affirmed Wilson's conviction for filing a false tax return after he attempted to deduct his bribes from his tax return. The Government declined to retry Aziz or Wilson.

Wilson was ultimately sentenced on September 29, 2023, to one year of probation, with the first six months to be served in home detention, 250 hours of community service, a fine of $75,000 and restitution in the amount of $88,546.

In June 2022, the final defendant in the investigation, Amin Khoury, was acquitted at trial of bribing a Georgetown University tennis coach to get his daughter into Georgetown. Khoury was accused of delivering $180,000 in a paper bag to the tennis coach through a middleman, not involving William Singer. Zangrillo (pardon), Khoury (jury acquittal), and Aziz (appellate reversal with no retrial) were the only parental defendants in the Varsity Blues saga to be charged but not convicted of any crime.

=== Allegations ===
Federal prosecutors alleged a college-admission scheme that involved:

- bribing exam administrators to facilitate cheating on college and university entrance exams;
- bribing coaches and administrators of elite universities to nominate unqualified applicants as elite recruited athletes, thus facilitating the applicants' admission;
- using a charitable organization to conceal the source and nature of laundered bribery payments.

Court documents unsealed in March 2019 detailed a scheme led by William Rick Singer, at the time a 58-year-old resident of Newport Beach, California. Wealthy parents paid Singer to illegally arrange to have their children admitted to elite schools by bribing admissions testing officials, athletics staff, and coaches at universities. Payments were made to Key Worldwide Foundation, a nonprofit organization owned by Singer and previously granted 501(c)(3) status; that status allowed him to avoid federal income taxes on the payments, while parents could deduct their "donations" from their own personal taxes. Singer offered college counseling services as The Edge College & Career Network, a limited liability company registered in 2012, which he operated out of his home in Newport Beach.

=== Methods of fraudulent admission ===
Singer primarily used two fraudulent techniques to help clients' children gain admission to elite universities: cheating on college entrance exams and fabrication of elite sports credentials.

==== Cheating on college entrance exams ====
Singer arranged to enable clients' children to cheat on the SAT or ACT college admission tests. Singer worked with psychologists to complete the detailed paperwork required to falsely certify clients' children as having a learning disability; this, in turn, gave them access to accommodations, such as extra time, while taking the tests. Singer said he could obtain a falsified disability report from a psychologist for $4,000 to $5,000, and that the report could be re-used to fraudulently obtain similar benefits at the schools.

Once the paperwork was complete, Singer told clients to invent false travel plans to arrange to have their child's test locations moved to a test center under his control, either in West Hollywood or Houston. Parents might also be advised to fabricate a family event that could provide a pretense for the student to take the SAT, ACT, or other test at a private location where Singer could have complete control over the testing process.

In some cases, the student was involved directly in the fraud. In others, the fraud was kept secret from the student and corrupt proctors altered tests on their behalf after the fact. In some cases, other people posed as the students to take the tests. Mark Riddell, a Harvard alumnus and college admission exam preparation director at IMG Academy, was one of the stand-in test takers who took over two dozen exams; he pleaded guilty to one count of conspiracy to commit mail fraud and honest services mail fraud and one count of money laundering, and agreed to cooperate with investigators. Prosecutors said he was paid $10,000 per test, and the government was seeking to recover almost $450,000 from him in forfeiture. Riddell did not have advance access to the test papers, but was described as "just a really smart guy". He could be sentenced to up to 20 years in prison, but reportedly prosecutors said that because of his cooperation, they would instead likely recommend 33 months' imprisonment at his November 1, 2019 (originally July 18) sentencing hearing.

According to recorded phone calls, the transcripts of which were included in court filings, Singer claimed that the practice of fraudulently obtaining accommodations such as extra testing time, intended for those with legitimate learning disabilities, was widespread outside of his particular scheme:

Yeah, everywhere around the country. What happened is, all the wealthy families that figured out that if I get my kid tested and they get extended time, they can do better on the test. So most of these kids don't even have issues, but they're getting time. The playing field is not fair.

For example, Jane Buckingham was arrested on March 12, 2019, for allegedly submitting false paperwork saying her son had a learning disability and paying $50,000 to Key Worldwide Foundation for a proctor to take the ACT on her son's behalf, scoring a 35 out of 36. The goal was entrance to the University of Southern California (USC). Portions of recorded conversations between Buckingham and a cooperating witness were included in the FBI's affidavit.

==== Fabrication of sports credentials ====
Singer also bribed college athletics staff and coaches. At certain colleges, these personnel can submit a certain number of sports recruit names to the admissions office, which then views those applications more favorably. Singer used his Key Worldwide Foundation as a money-laundering operation to pay coaches a bribe for labeling applicants as athletic recruits. He also fabricated profiles highlighting each applicant's purported athletic prowess. In some cases, image editing software (e.g., Adobe Photoshop) was used to insert a photograph of a student's face onto a photograph of another person participating in the sport to document purported athletic activity.

In one such incident, Michael Center, the men's tennis coach at the University of Texas (UT), accepted about $100,000 to designate an applicant as a recruit for the Texas Longhorns tennis team. A similar fraud occurred at Yale, where the then-head coach of the women's soccer team, Rudolph "Rudy" Meredith, allegedly accepted a $450,000 bribe to falsely identify an applicant as a recruit. USC's senior associate athletic director Donna Heinel and water polo coach Jovan Vavic allegedly received $1.3 million and $250,000, respectively, for similar frauds. They were indicted alongside former USC women's soccer coaches Ali Khosroshahin and Laura Janke. Coaches at two other Pac-12 programs, the University of California, Los Angeles (UCLA) men's soccer coach Jorge Salcedo and Stanford University sailing coach John Vandemoer, were charged with accepting bribes. Vandemoer admitted that he accepted $270,000 to classify two applicants as prospective sailors, and agreed to plead guilty to a charge of racketeering conspiracy. At Wake Forest, head volleyball coach William "Bill" Ferguson was placed on administrative leave following charges of racketeering. Former Georgetown University tennis coach Gordon "Gordie" Ernst is alleged to have facilitated as many as 12 students through fraudulent means while accepting bribes of up to $950,000. On March 20, 2019, the University of San Diego (USD) revealed that its former men's basketball head coach, Lamont Smith, allegedly accepted bribes. Hours after that revelation, Smith resigned from his position as assistant coach at the University of Texas at El Paso. Two San Diego families were accused of paying $875,000 as part of the scheme.

A guidance counselor at Buckley School learned that a student had been accepted to Tulane University, Georgetown University and Loyola Marymount University as an "African-American tennis whiz, ranked in the Top 10 in California", though the student was white and did not play tennis. The student's father denied using an outside admissions consultant before admitting that his family had hired Singer.

Bill McGlashan, a private equity investor, allegedly discussed using Adobe Photoshop to create a fake profile for his son as a football kicker to help him get into USC. Similarly, Marci Palatella, wife of former San Francisco 49ers player Lou Palatella, allegedly conspired with Singer to pass her son off as a long snapper recruit for USC. In one of the most notable cases, actress Lori Loughlin, famous for her role on the American sitcom Full House and the drama When Calls the Heart, and her husband, fashion designer Mossimo Giannulli of Mossimo fashion, allegedly paid $500,000 in bribes to arrange to have their two daughters accepted into USC as members of the rowing team, although neither girl had participated in the sport. On March 13, 2019, media sources reported that, when news of the scandal broke, Loughlin's younger daughter was on Rick Caruso's yacht in the Bahamas with her friend, Gianna, Caruso's daughter. Caruso is the chairman of the USC Board of Trustees.

Singer pleaded guilty on March 12, 2019, in the U.S. District Court in Boston to four felony counts of conspiracy to commit money laundering, conspiracy to defraud the United States, and obstruction of justice for alerting a number of subjects to the investigation after he began cooperating with the government. He faced up to 65 years in prison and a fine of $1.25 million. He was sentenced in January 2023, with federal prosecutors asking for six years in prison and Singer's attorneys asking for home detention and community service. Judge Rya Zobel sentenced him to three and a half years in prison, with an additional three years of probation, as well as over $10 million in restitution to the IRS and forfeiture of millions of dollars in assets. Singer apologized for his actions, saying, "I lost my ethical values and have so much regret. To be frank, I’m ashamed of myself."

== Involved parties and organizations ==
50 people have been charged in the investigations, including 33 parents of college applicants and 11 named collegiate coaches or athletic administrators from eight universities. Numerous other universities were not implicated in the scandal but were themselves victims of Singer's and his clients' actions, such as by considering applications of students with fraudulent test scores.

=== Key Worldwide Foundation / The Edge College & Career Network ===
- William Rick Singer, a purported college counselor, and author of self-help books for college admission. Singer organized and sold fraudulent college admission services. Singer pleaded guilty and cooperated with the prosecution.
- Mark Riddell, a Harvard alumnus and former director of college entrance exams at IMG Academy. Riddell was paid by Singer to fraudulently take admission tests, impersonating the clients' children; he also paid College Board (which develops and administers the SAT and related tests), Educational Testing Service, and ACT contractors to deliberately mis-administer the tests. He was fired from IMG Academy and pleaded guilty. Mark Riddell was sentenced to four months in prison and had to forfeit nearly $240,000.
- Steven Masera, officer at Singer's companies. Pleaded guilty to conspiracy to commit racketeering.
- Mikaela Sanford, an employee at Singer's companies. Pleaded guilty to conspiracy to commit racketeering.

==== Other involved conspirators ====
- Igor Dvorskiy, administrator of standardized tests (including those from ACT and the College Board), and director of an LA-area private school. Pleaded guilty to conspiracy to commit racketeering.
- Martin Fox, Houston tennis academy president. Pleaded guilty to conspiracy to commit racketeering. Sentenced to 3 months in prison, 15 months' supervised release with 3 months' home confinement, $95,000 fine, forfeiture of $245,000 & 250 hours of community service.
- Niki Williams, administrator of standardized tests for ACT and College Board, Houston-area assistant high school teacher. Pleaded guilty to mail and wire fraud.

=== Universities and accused personnel ===
The following universities, their associated athletic programs, and 11 university personnel were involved in the case:

University	Athletic program	Indicted personnel	Sport	Details
Georgetown University	Hoyas	Gordon "Gordie" Ernst	Men's and women's tennis	Former men's and women's tennis coach. Relocated to the University of Rhode Island, where he was placed on administrative leave after he was charged and arrested. Ernst, who once coached former U.S. First Lady Michelle Obama, later pleaded guilty to conspiracy to commit federal programs bribery, three counts of federal programs bribery, and to filing false tax returns for failing to report many of the bribery payments. Sentenced to 30 months in prison.
Stanford University	Cardinal	John Vandemoer	Sailing	Former sailing coach, pleaded guilty, fired and received one day's imprisonment with time served, six months' house arrest, $10,000 fine and two years' supervised release.
University of California, Los Angeles (UCLA)	Bruins	Jorge Salcedo	Men's soccer	Former men's soccer head coach and former Major League Soccer player, placed on leave, then resigned. Pleaded guilty. Sentenced to eight months in prison, 1 year of supervised release and a forfeiture of $200,000.
University of San Diego (USD)	Toreros	Lamont Smith	Men's basketball	Former men's basketball head coach The man accused of bribing Smith, Martin Fox, was sentenced to three months in prison, three months of home confinement, 250 hours of community service, forfeiture of $245,000 and an additional fine of $95,000 after pleading guilty. Unlike Martin Fox and all the other defendants, Smith is not listed by the U.S. Justice Department as being among those who were charged.
University of Southern California (USC)	Trojans	Donna Heinel	Multiple	Former senior associate athletic director, fired and arrested. Pleaded guilty on November 5, 2021, to one count of honest services wire fraud, which resulted in other, more serious charges being dropped. Sentenced in January 2023 to six months in prison and two years of supervised release. Released July 5, 2023.
University of Southern California (USC)	Trojans	Laura Janke	Women's soccer	Former women's soccer coach; pleaded guilty. Sentenced to time served, one year of probation and 250 hours of community service.
University of Southern California (USC)	Trojans	Ali Khosroshahin	Women's soccer	Former women's soccer head coach; sentenced to time served and one year of supervised release, with the first six months to be served in home confinement and ordered to pay forfeiture for $208,990.
University of Southern California (USC)	Trojans	Jovan Vavic	Men's and women's water polo	Former men's and women's water polo coach, fired and arrested Vavic's criminal trial officially began on March 10, 2022. Vavic, who was also accused of helping recruit other coaches into the bribery scheme, was the only implicated coach to not accept any prosecution deal and challenge criminal charges in court, as well as the last of the coaches to serve as a defendant. Convicted April 8, 2022, and sentenced to four months in prison. Conviction overturned on September 15, 2022, and a new trial ordered. On May 30, 2025, his conviction was reinstated by the Boston-based 1st U.S. Circuit Court of Appeals.
University of Texas at Austin (UT)	Longhorns	Michael Center	Men's tennis	Former men's tennis head coach, fired, pleaded guilty to conspiracy to commit fraud. Sentenced February 24, 2020, to six months' imprisonment, one year's supervised release, and a forfeiture of $60,000.
Wake Forest University	Demon Deacons	William "Bill" Ferguson	Volleyball	Volleyball coach, placed on academic leave. Later resigned after being criminally charged. The Prosecution's case against Ferguson was later dropped in October 2021 after he agreed to pay a $50,000 fine and accept responsibility for his actions.
Yale University	Bulldogs	Rudolph "Rudy" Meredith	Women's soccer	Former women's soccer coach, pleaded guilty and led the FBI to Singer Sentenced to 5 months in prison, one year probation, and a $19,000 fine.

=== Parents ===
Officials said Singer had many legitimate clients, who did not engage in any fraud. Singer cited famous clients on his Facebook page while promoting his 2014 book Getting In and, as a result of this and other public endorsements by Singer, many former clients have made statements to distance themselves and their children from any perceived involvement in the scandal.

The table below lists parents in connection with the nationwide college admissions prosecution as listed by CNN, CBS News, and People. Morrie Tobin is not included in the above total due to the fact that he is an unindicted cooperating witness supporting the prosecution's case. To date, 38 of the indicted parents have either pleaded guilty or have been convicted.

Nature of alleged fraud	Parent	Target of fraud	Family member	Status	Details
Admissions	Gamal Aziz	USC	Daughter	Sentenced on February 9, 2022. The sentence later vacated on appeal.	Former president and COO of Wynn Resorts and former CEO of MGM Resorts International. Arrested, but granted a personal recognizance release bond, which came with an order for him to appear in court. Found guilty in October 2021 and sentenced in February 2022. The U.S. Court of Appeals vacated Aziz's convictions on May 10, 2023. The appeals court found that the lower court had made missteps during his trial.
Admissions	Jeffrey Bizzack	USC	Son	Sentenced October 30, 2019	California businessman sentenced to two months in prison, a $250,000 fine and to serve 900 hours of community service over three years of supervised release.
Admissions	Diane Blake	USC	Daughter	Sentenced on November 17, 2020	Wife of Todd Blake, sentenced to 6 weeks in prison.
Admissions	Todd Blake	USC	Daughter	Sentenced on November 17, 2020	Entrepreneur and investor, husband of Diane Blake, sentenced to 4 months in prison.
Admissions	Mossimo Giannulli	USC	Two daughters (including Olivia Jade)	Sentenced on August 21, 2020	Sentenced to 5 months in prison, two years of supervised release, a $250,000 fine and 250 hours of community service.
Admissions	Lori Loughlin	USC	Two daughters (including Olivia Jade)	Sentenced on August 21, 2020	Actress best known for her roles on Full House and When Calls the Heart. Sentenced to 2 months in prison, two years of supervised release, a $150,000 fine and 100 hours of community service.
Admissions	Douglas Hodge	USC	Son and two daughters	Sentenced February 7, 2020	Former CEO of PIMCO. Sentenced to nine months in prison, two years' supervised release, 500 hours of community service and a $750,000 fine.
Admissions	Agustin Huneeus Jr.	USC	Daughter	Sentenced October 4, 2019	Napa Valley vineyard owner. Pleaded guilty to a single count of conspiracy to commit mail fraud and honest services mail fraud. Sentenced to five months in prison, 500 hours of community service, two years' supervised release and a $100,000 fine.
Admissions	Davina Isackson	UCLA	Daughter	Pleaded guilty on May 1, 2019.	Wife of Bruce Isackson. Sentenced to one year of probation and 250 hours of community service and fined $1,000.
Admissions	Bruce Isackson	UCLA	Daughter	Pleaded guilty on May 1, 2019	Real estate development executive, husband of Davina. Sentenced to one year of probation and 250 hours of community service and fined $7,500.
Admissions	Elisabeth Kimmel	Georgetown	Daughter	Pleaded guilty	Media executive and former owner of KFMB stations. Arrested on charges of conspiracy to commit mail fraud and honest services mail fraud. Husband, a former San Diego prosecutor, was charged with wire fraud as well, though charges were no longer in place by August 2021. Charge also involved allegations of getting the daughter admitted into Georgetown through phony athletic credentials. Elisabeth Kimmel pleaded guilty on August 16, 2021. On December 9, 2021, she was sentenced to six weeks in prison and two years of supervised release, with the first year spent in home confinement and was required to pay a $250,000 fine and perform 500 hours of community service after the court officially accepted the plea.
Admissions	Elisabeth Kimmel	USC	Son	Pleaded guilty	
Admissions	Toby MacFarlane	USC	Daughter	Sentenced November 13, 2019	Title insurance executive. Pleaded guilty to one count of conspiracy to commit mail fraud and honest services mail fraud. Sentenced to 6 months in prison, 200 hours of community service, a $150,000 fine, and to be under two years of supervised release.
Admissions	Toby MacFarlane	USC	Son	Sentenced November 13, 2019	Title insurance executive. Pleaded guilty to one count of conspiracy to commit mail fraud and honest services mail fraud. Sentenced to 6 months in prison, 200 hours of community service, a $150,000 fine, and to be under two years of supervised release.
Admissions	Marci Palatella	USC	Son	Initially pleaded not guilty. Opted to reverse the plea and pleaded guilty at a later date.	Distillery owner; her husband, former San Francisco 49ers guard Lou Palatella, has not been indicted. Jailed on charges of conspiracy to commit mail fraud and Honest Services Mail fraud; released on a $1,000,000 unsecured bond and afterwards appeared in court. On August 24, 2021, Marci reversed course and agreed to plead guilty. Pleaded guilty to conspiracy to commit mail fraud on August 25, 2021. Sentenced on December 16, 2021, to six weeks in prison, a $250,000 fine, two years of supervised release, with a condition of home confinement for the first six months of supervised release, and 500 hours of community service, as previously recommended by both the prosecution and defense.
Admissions	Robert Repella	Georgetown	Daughter	Pleaded guilty	Biotech executive who once served as CEO of Harmony Biosciences. Pleaded guilty to conspiracy to commit mail fraud and honest services mail fraud. Not involved in the Rick Singer conspiracy. Sentenced to a month of home detention, 220 hours of community service and a $220,000 fine.
Admissions	Stephen Semprevivo	Georgetown	Son	Sentenced. September 26, 2019	Sales executive. Pleaded guilty to a single count of conspiracy to commit mail fraud and honest services mail fraud. Sentenced to four months in prison, 500 hours of community service, two years' supervised release and a $100,000 fine. Reported bribe of $400,000.
Admissions	Devin Sloane	USC	Son	Sentenced September 24, 2019	CEO and founder of a water infrastructure company. Pleaded guilty to a single count of conspiracy to commit mail fraud and honest services mail fraud. Sentenced to four months in prison, 500 hours of community service, two years' supervised release and a $95,000 fine.
Admissions	Xiaoning Sui	UCLA	Son	Pleaded guilty	Canadian resident who paid $400,000 in an attempt to pose her son as an alleged soccer recruit. Held in Spanish prison for 5 months before being extradited to the United States to plead guilty and be sentenced to time served, a $250,000 fine and a forfeiture of $400,000.
Admissions	John Wilson	USC Criminal trial began on September 8, 2021.	Son	Found guilty on all counts for USC trial.	Private equity and real estate development CEO. Once served as an executive at both Old Navy and Staples. Charged in March 2019 with wire fraud related to a reported $220,000 bribe made to falsify his son's water polo credentials and athletic credentials for his two daughters. Found guilty in October 2021 and sentenced in February 2022, the U.S. Court of Appeals vacated Wilson's convictions (except for filing a false tax return) on May 10, 2023. The appeals court found that the lower court had made missteps during his trial. Sentenced on September 29, 2023, to one year of probation with the first six months to be served in home detention, 250 hours of community service, a fine of $75,000 and restitution in the amount of $88,546.
Admissions	John Wilson	Stanford	Twin daughters		
Admissions	John Wilson	Harvard	Twin daughters		
Admissions	Homayoun Zadeh	USC	Daughter	Pleaded guilty July 9, 2021 Officially sentenced November 10, 2021.	Associate professor of dentistry at USC. Allowed to travel abroad in April 2019 after being criminally charged with wire fraud based on alleged bribery used to designate his daughter as a lacrosse recruit in order get a USC scholarship. Reportedly lost book deal following the accusations. Pleaded guilty on July 9, 2021, to one count of filing a false tax return. Was given a sentence of six weeks in prison, 250 hours of community service and a $20,000 fine.
Admissions	Robert Zangrillo	USC	Daughter	Pardoned without being tried	Dragon Global founder and CEO. Pardoned on January 20, 2021 He had been accused of bribing athletic officials at USC to designate his daughter as an athletic recruit and having CW-1's employee, Mikaela Sanford, take classes on behalf of his daughter. Zangrillo was also accused of wiring $200,000 to one of Key Worldwide Foundation's false charitable accounts.
Admissions & Testing	Robert Flaxman	USD	Son	Sentenced October 18, 2019	Founder and CEO of Crown Realty & Development. Pleaded guilty to a single count of conspiracy to commit mail fraud and honest services mail fraud. Sentenced to one month in prison, 250 hours of community service, one year's supervised release and a $50,000 fine.
Admissions & Testing	Robert Flaxman	ACT	Daughter	Sentenced October 18, 2019	Founder and CEO of Crown Realty & Development. Pleaded guilty to a single count of conspiracy to commit mail fraud and honest services mail fraud. Sentenced to one month in prison, 250 hours of community service, one year's supervised release and a $50,000 fine.
Admissions & Testing	Elizabeth Henriquez; Manuel Henriquez	Georgetown	Older daughter	Pleaded guilty Elizabeth Henriquez sentenced March 31, 2020. Manuel Henriquez sentenced July 29, 2020.	Elizabeth Henriquez and Manuel Henriquez are married. He is the Hercules Capital founder, and resigned as chairman and CEO. Elizabeth Henriquez sentenced to seven months in prison, two years' supervised release, 300 hours of community service and a $200,000 fine. Manuel Henriquez sentenced to six months in prison, two years' supervised release, 200 hours of community service and a $200,000 fine.
Admissions & Testing	Elizabeth Henriquez; Manuel Henriquez	Northwestern; ACT and SAT	Younger daughter	Pleaded guilty Elizabeth Henriquez sentenced March 31, 2020. Manuel Henriquez sentenced July 29, 2020.	Elizabeth Henriquez and Manuel Henriquez are married. He is the Hercules Capital founder, and resigned as chairman and CEO. Elizabeth Henriquez sentenced to seven months in prison, two years' supervised release, 300 hours of community service and a $200,000 fine. Manuel Henriquez sentenced to six months in prison, two years' supervised release, 200 hours of community service and a $200,000 fine.
Admissions & Testing	Michelle Janavs	USC and Georgetown	Daughter and son	Sentenced February 25, 2020	Food industry executive and who was at one point regarded as the "heiress" to her father Paul Merage's former microwave snack company Hot Pockets. Pleaded guilty to conspiracy to commit mail and wire fraud and conspiracy to commit money laundering. Sentenced to five months in prison, 200 hours of community service, two years' supervised release and a $250,000 fine.
Admissions & Testing	Michelle Janavs	ACT	Daughter and son	Sentenced February 25, 2020	Food industry executive and who was at one point regarded as the "heiress" to her father Paul Merage's former microwave snack company Hot Pockets. Pleaded guilty to conspiracy to commit mail and wire fraud and conspiracy to commit money laundering. Sentenced to five months in prison, 200 hours of community service, two years' supervised release and a $250,000 fine.
Admissions & Testing	Bill McGlashan	USC	Son	Pleaded Guilty in February, 2021.	Former managing partner and founder of TPG Growth, fired by TPG. Pleaded guilty to one count of wire fraud and honest services wire fraud in February 2021. Ordered to serve a sentence which included three months in prison and a $250,000 fine.
Admissions & Testing	Bill McGlashan	ACT	Son	Pleaded Guilty in February, 2021.	Former managing partner and founder of TPG Growth, fired by TPG. Pleaded guilty to one count of wire fraud and honest services wire fraud in February 2021. Ordered to serve a sentence which included three months in prison and a $250,000 fine.
Testing	Gregory Abbott	ACT and SAT	Daughter	Sentenced October 8, 2019	Founder and chairman of International Dispensing Corp. and husband of Marcia Abbott. Pleaded guilty to a single count of conspiracy to commit mail fraud and honest services mail fraud. Sentenced to one month in prison, 250 hours of community service, one year's supervised release and a $45,000 fine.
Testing	Marcia Abbott	ACT and SAT	Daughter	Sentenced October 8, 2019	Wife of Gregory Abbott. Pleaded guilty to a single count of conspiracy to commit mail fraud and honest services mail fraud. Sentenced to one month in prison, 250 hours of community service, one year's supervised release and a $45,000 fine.
Testing	Jane Buckingham	ACT	Son	Sentenced October 23, 2019	Marketing executive and self-help book author. Pleaded guilty to conspiracy to commit mail fraud and honest services mail fraud. Sentenced to 21 days in prison, one year's supervised release and a $40,000 fine.
Testing	Gordon Caplan	ACT	Daughter	Sentenced October 3, 2019	Co-chairman of law firm Willkie Farr & Gallagher. Pleaded guilty to a single count of conspiracy to commit mail fraud and honest services mail fraud. Sentenced to one month in prison, 250 hours of community service, one year's supervised release, and a $50,000 fine.
Testing	I-Hsin "Joey" Chen	ACT	Son	Pleaded guilty	Shipping and warehousing-services operator Agreed to plead guilty to both wire fraud and honest service fraud on December 8, 2021. Sentenced to 9 weeks in prison, one year of probation, 100 hours of community service and a $75,000 fine.
Testing	Amy Colburn	SAT	Son	Pleaded guilty	Wife of Gregory Colburn Charged with conspiracy to commit mail fraud Agreed to plead guilty on December 1, 2021 Sentenced to 8 weeks in prison, one year of probation, 100 hours of community service and a $12,500 fine.
Testing	Gregory Colburn	SAT	Son	Pleaded guilty	Radiation oncologist, husband of Amy Colburn Charged with conspiracy to commit mail fraud. Agreed to plead guilty on December 1, 2021 Sentenced to 8 weeks in prison, one year probation, 100 hours community service and a $12,500 fine.
Testing	Felicity Huffman	SAT	Daughter	Sentenced September 13, 2019	Academy Award-nominated actress. Pleaded guilty to a single count of conspiracy to commit mail fraud and honest services mail fraud. Sentenced to 14 days in prison, 250 hours of community service, one year's supervised release and a $30,000 fine.
Testing	Marjorie Klapper	Entrance exam	Son	Sentenced October 16, 2019	Jewelry business co-owner. Pleaded guilty to a single count of conspiracy to commit mail fraud and honest services mail fraud. Sentenced to 21 days in prison, 250 hours of community services, one year's supervised release and a $9,500 fine.
Testing	Karen Littlefair	Online Classes	Son	Sentenced July 15, 2020	Pleaded guilty to one count of conspiracy to commit wire fraud. Sentenced to 5 weeks in prison, two years of supervised release, 300 hours of community service and a $209,000 fine.
Testing	Peter Jan Sartorio	ACT	Daughter	Sentenced October 11, 2019	Food industry executive. Pleaded guilty to a single count of conspiracy to commit mail fraud and honest services mail fraud. Sentenced to one year's probation, 250 hours of community service and a $9,500 fine.
Testing	David Sidoo	SAT; Canadian high school graduation exam Potentially resulted in admission to UC Berkeley	Two sons	Sentenced July 15, 2020	Canadian businessman and former Canadian Football League player. Pleaded guilty to one count of conspiracy to commit mail fraud. Sentenced to 90 days in prison, one year's supervised release and a $250,000 fine.
Unindicted cooperating witness
Admissions	Morrie Tobin	Yale	Youngest daughter		Offered information on the case to prosecutors in exchange for leniency on an unrelated fraud charge.; Purportedly was asked for a bribe by Yale coach Rudy Meredith in exchange for Meredith getting Tobin's youngest daughter admitted into Yale.; Tobin has not been charged or indicted in the case.

== Responses ==
In response to the scandal, the National Collegiate Athletic Association (NCAA), the chief governing body for college sports in the United States, announced plans to review the allegations "to determine the extent to which NCAA rules may have been violated".

U.S. Senator Ron Wyden (D-OR) of the Senate Finance Committee plans to sponsor a bill making donations to schools taxable if the donor has children attending or applying to the college. Separately, Senators Chris Coons (D-DE) and Johnny Isakson (R-GA) have agreed to reintroduce 2017 legislation that imposes a fine on colleges and universities that have the smallest proportion of low-income students.

One of the parents who was convicted, Robert Zangrillo, was pardoned by President Donald Trump on his final day in office. Tom Barrack and Sean Parker were listed by the White House in support of the action, though both denied any advocacy for Zangrillo, nor were there donations to Trump from him.

=== Actions taken ===
Indicted coaches were fired or suspended, or had already left the university at the time of the charges. Mark Riddell, who took tests on behalf of the students, was suspended from his position as director of college entrance exam preparation at IMG Academy and fired a week later.

On March 26, 2019, Yale became the first university to rescind the admission of a student associated with the scandal. On April 2, Stanford announced they also expelled a student connected to the fraud. In July 2020, Grand Canyon University ended its relationship with Singer, who had been enrolled in its doctorate of psychology program since November 2019.

The Hallmark Channel cut its ties to Lori Loughlin, star of the programs Garage Sale Mystery and When Calls the Heart, after she was named as a parent in the indictments. According to The Hill, Netflix decided to drop Loughlin from Fuller House as well. Her younger daughter, Olivia Jade, also lost her partnerships with TRESemmé and the Sephora chain of beauty products. A USC spokesperson confirmed in March that both of Loughlin's daughters remained enrolled at the school, but in October the school's registrar stated they were no longer enrolled. According to the San Jose Mercury News, USC scheduled a hearing in March 2019 to determine if Olivia Jade should be designated a "disruptive individual", which would result in her lifetime ban from the university's campus and properties. Loughlin was found guilty and began serving a two-month prison sentence on October 30, 2020. Giannulli, who was also found guilty, began serving a five-month prison sentence on November 19, 2020.

=== Criminal proceedings ===
On March 12, 2019, William Singer, the CEO of Edge College & Career Network who masterminded the scandal, pleaded guilty to four criminal charges involving racketeering conspiracy, money laundering conspiracy, conspiracy to defraud the U.S. government and obstruction of justice. On January 4, 2023, William Singer was sentenced to 3.5 years in federal prison, 3 years of supervised release, and forfeiture of over $10 million.

On May 13, 2019, actress Felicity Huffman formally pleaded guilty to honest services fraud, which involved hiring someone to take the SAT using the name of her daughter, Sophia. On September 13, she was sentenced to 14 days in jail, one year of supervised release, fined $30,000 and ordered to undertake 250 hours of community service. On October 15, 2019, Huffman reported to the Federal Correctional Institution in Dublin, California, to begin her sentence. She was meant to be released from prison on October 27, 2019, but was released two days early because October 27 fell on a weekend. No charges were filed against Huffman's husband and Sophia's father, actor and director William H. Macy.

On September 8, 2021, the scandal's first criminal trial, which saw parents John Wilson and Gamal Aziz (also called Gamal Abdelaziz) as defendants, officially began, with jury selection commencing in a Boston federal court. This trial was centered around phony credentials which the two defendants paid to admit their children into the University of Southern California. Both men were convicted by a jury in October 2021, after 10 hours of deliberation. However, in May 2023, the U.S. Court of Appeals for the First Circuit reversed all of Aziz's convictions and reversed all of Wilson's conviction (except for filing a false tax return). In a 154-page decision, the court determined the trial court had erred by instructing the jury admissions spots were "property" for purposes of the offenses of mail and wire fraud, and Wilson's conviction for conspiracy must be overturned because the trial court erred by allowing the admission of "significant amount of powerful evidence related to other parents’ wrongdoing in which these defendants played no part, creating an unacceptable risk that the jury convicted Abdelaziz and Wilson based on others' conduct" rather than evidence they had joined Singer's scheme as conspirators.

Aziz would be the only accused parent to avoid punishment. Despite having most of his convictions overturned and evading prison time, Wilson would later be re-sentenced for his false tax return conviction that was upheld. On September 29, 2023, Wilson was sentenced to one year of probation, with the first six months to be served in home detention, and 250 hours of community service. He was also ordered to pay a fine of $75,000 and restitution in the amount of $88,546.

On March 10, 2022, the first criminal trial involving a former coach, former USC water polo coach Jovan Vavic, began in the same Boston federal court as well. Vavic was the only coach implicated in the case who opted to challenge the charges brought against him in court. On April 9, 2022, a federal jury in Boston convicted Vavic of fraud and bribery. On September 15, 2022, Vavic's conviction was overturned, with Boston-based U.S. District Judge Indira Talwani ruling that evidence presented at trial did not determine that the payments “served the defendants’ interests and harmed the university's,” and a new trial was ordered.

=== Civil lawsuits ===
In 2019, applicants who had been rejected from elite colleges that had accepted Singer's clients filed two civil lawsuits in the U.S. District Court for the Northern District of California against the universities and Singer, alleged that they were defrauded of both application fees and a fair admission process. In 2020, the court dismissed both lawsuits for lack of legal standing, because, "No plaintiff alleges that they applied for, were being considered for, or were denied an athletic spot ... hence, even if the college admissions scheme occurred as plaintiffs claim, no plaintiff was particularly affected by the scheme."

In 2024, Wilson accused the University of Southern California of fraud and deceit in a $75 million lawsuit claiming that Singer's advisement to donate $100,000 to the university was confirmed by its water polo coach and an athletics department administrator. USC stated that the suit had no legal merit.

=== Related cases ===
In November 2020, former Harvard University fencing coach Peter Brand and Harvard parent Jie "Jack" Zhao were indicted on bribery and conspiracy to commit honest services wire fraud after a series of investigative articles in The Boston Globe. Although the alleged crimes are not connected to Rick Singer or the broader Varsity Blues conspiracy, the case's discovery and eventual prosecution has been credited to the increased scrutiny on admissions practices that resulted from the greater fallout of the scandal. Both defendants have denied the charges, and the trial was scheduled to begin in December 2022. On December 21, 2022, both defendants Jie "Jack" Zhao and Peter Brand were acquitted of all charges. The jury deliberated for only five hours before returning the not guilty verdicts.

=== Commentary ===
After the scandal broke, multiple American news sources including The Atlantic, Vox, Rolling Stone, and The New York Times characterized it as a symptom of a broken college admissions system. Alan Dershowitz, professor emeritus at Harvard Law School, said it was "the worst scandal involving elite universities in the history of the United States". Elizabeth Warren, United States Senator from Massachusetts (where all the criminal cases were filed), told news media that the scandal represented "just one more example of how the rich and powerful know how to take care of their own".

Much of the news coverage attempted to explain why anyone would have been tempted by Singer's scheme. A common attribute among the defendants was that many were rich, but not ultra-rich. According to The New York Times, college admissions at certain elite American universities had become so selective that a family would have to make a minimum donation of $10 million to inspire an admission committee to take a second look at their child, and even for families of such means, there would be no guarantee of return on investment, while Singer was selling certainty. In open court, he said: "I created a guarantee." The Los Angeles Times explained that there was probably also a social signaling element at work, in that admission to an elite university based purely upon an applicant's apparent merit publicly validates both the child's innate talent and the parents' own parenting skills in a way that an admission coinciding with a sizable donation does not.

In turn, others examined why certain universities had become so selective in the first place. The Atlantic pointed out that college seats are not scarce in the United States, except at a handful of universities which became selective on purpose: "[S]carcity has the added benefit of increasing an institution's prestige. The more students who apply, and the fewer students who get in, the more selective an institution becomes, and, subsequently, the more prestigious. And parents are clawing over one another to get a taste of the social capital that comes with that." Arizona State University (ASU) president Michael M. Crow described the "crisis of access to these social-status-granting institutions" as a full-blown "hysteria". It was alleged in court filings that one of the defendant parents had named ASU as a university they were specifically trying to avoid; the non-selective university has been the "butt of jokes" in American television shows for many years. The inevitable result, according to Newsweek, was that the most elite institutions had created a situation in which purely meritocratic admissions had become impossible because they were already turning away too many overqualified candidates—former Harvard president Drew Gilpin Faust had once said, "we could fill our class twice over with valedictorians." It was also recognized that any workable long-term solution would need to alleviate the underlying anxiety driving the crisis, either by restructuring the college admissions process or the American labor market.

HuffPost explained that such anxiety barely exists in Canada, whose four-year universities do not show such extreme disparities in selectivity and prestige, and in turn, most Canadian employers do not rigidly discriminate between job candidates based upon where they graduated. In contrast, selective American universities have evolved into gatekeepers for the highest echelons of certain socially prestigious and financially lucrative industries like law and finance. University of Oklahoma history professor Wilfred M. McClay told Newsweek: "I'm not going to pretend there isn't a difference between Harvard and Suffolk County Community College, but I think this situation where the Supreme Court is made up entirely of Harvard (Note: The one exception to Professor McClay's statement (at the time it was made in 2019) was that Associate Justice Ruth Bader Ginsburg had attended Harvard for her first two years of law school but did not graduate from Harvard. After her husband found a job in New York City, Dean Erwin Griswold denied Ginsburg's request to earn credit at Columbia Law School towards her Harvard law degree. Ginsburg stayed with her husband, formally transferred to Columbia for her third year of law school, and earned her law degree from Columbia.) or Yale Law School graduates is wrong. The thing driving the current scandal seems to be that ultimately parents were willing to do anything to game the system to get their kids these advantages, not because the education was better but because the legitimation of social position would be better."

Writing for The Washington Post, psychologists Jonathan Wai, Matt Brown and Christopher Chabris cited research on the predictive powers of the SAT and the doubtful value of costly SAT preparation programs, and concluded, "If the SAT were nothing but a wealth test, then Lori Loughlin, Mossimo Giannulli and other super-rich parents would not have had to cheat to get their kids into the latter two schools. In reality, they had to fake intellectual ability—the one thing they could not buy." However, a study published in 2024 by Wai, Chabris, and three other researchers showed that the anxiety of many students and their parents does have an empirical basis. Earning a degree from a highly selective university may not necessarily guarantee a life of exceptional achievement, but there is a strong correlation between the two. They systematically analyzed the educational backgrounds of members of "30 different achievement groups totaling 26,198 people" and found that most groups were overwhelmingly dominated by graduates of 34 elite higher education institutions, especially Harvard University.

== Documentaries and adaptation ==
In 2019, Lifetime produced and broadcast a television film about this event called The College Admissions Scandal. The film stars Penelope Ann Miller as Caroline DeVere, Mia Kirshner as Bethany Slade, and Michael Shanks as Rick Singer. In 2019, Lifetime also released a documentary called Beyond the Headlines: The College Admissions Scandal with Gretchen Carlson.

On April 4, 2019, three weeks after Operation Varsity Blues' charges were made public, Granite Bay High School debuted Ranked, a new musical. The show, written from 2018 to 2019 by the school's drama teacher and musical director, focused on academic pressure in schools, specifically telling the story of a student whose parents were paying for his grades without his knowledge. The timing of the musical's debut in relation to the scandal earned the high school national attention. Rick Singer worked in the Granite Bay community a decade prior as a college coach for local high school students.

A fictionalized account of the events was in the book Admissions by Julie Buxbaum, released on December 1, 2020. It tells the story from the point of view of the child of a fictional actress who was charged.

Netflix released a documentary on the subject, Operation Varsity Blues: The College Admissions Scandal, in 2021, mostly focusing on Singer, played by Matthew Modine.

In 2021, Casey Lyons and Caroline Miller wrote and self-produced Bars of Ivy: The College Admissions Scandal Musical about the scandal from the perspective of a student affected by it.

== See also ==
- 2026 NEET controversy, arrests after questions on Indian medical-college entrance exam leaked in
