= Mossimo =

Mid-range American clothing company

- Industry: Textile
- Founded: 1986; 40 years ago Newport Beach, California, U.S.
- Founder: Mossimo Giannulli
- Defunct: 2006
- Fate: Acquired by Iconix Brand Group
- Headquarters: Irvine, California, U.S.
- Area served: Worldwide
- Products: Shirts, jeans, jackets, socks, underwear, accessories
- Owner: Mossimo Giannulli (1986–2006); Iconix Brand Group (2006–present)

Mossimo is a sportswear and accessories company founded in 1986 by designer Mossimo Giannulli and acquired by Iconix Brand Group in 2006. Mossimo specializes in youth and teenage clothing, including shirts, jeans, jackets, socks, underwear, and accessories.

== History ==
=== Founding (1986) and expansion ===
Mossimo was founded in 1986 by Mossimo Giannulli on Balboa Island in Newport Beach, California. Giannulli dropped out of the University of Southern California in 1987 to create his Mossimo streetwear line, funded by a $100,000 loan from his father. At the close of the company's first fiscal year, Giannulli reported $1 million in profits. The following year, the company generated $4 million.

Mossimo clothing featured prominently in the 1990 volleyball film Side Out.

=== IPO (1996) and relationship with Target (2000–2017) ===
In 1996, Mossimo went public in an initial public offering (IPO). After share prices declined from $50.00 to $4.75 following an attempt to transition the brand from streetwear and beachwear to high fashion, Giannulli repositioned the brand for a broader consumer market. On March 28, 2000, Mossimo, Inc. announced a major, multi-product licensing agreement with Target stores for $27.8 million. In 2017, Target restructured its inventory, introducing smaller lines and eliminating bigger brands, including Mossimo.

Target distanced itself from Mossimo amid Mossimo Giannulli's involvement in the 2019 college admissions bribery scandal, saying that Target had not been involved with Giannulli in over a decade. Giannulli and his wife, actress Lori Loughlin, were convicted of bribing University of Southern California officials with up to $500,000 to secure the enrollment of their two daughters.

=== Acquisition by Iconix (2006) ===
In 2006, Mossimo was acquired by Iconix Brand Group.

== Gallery ==
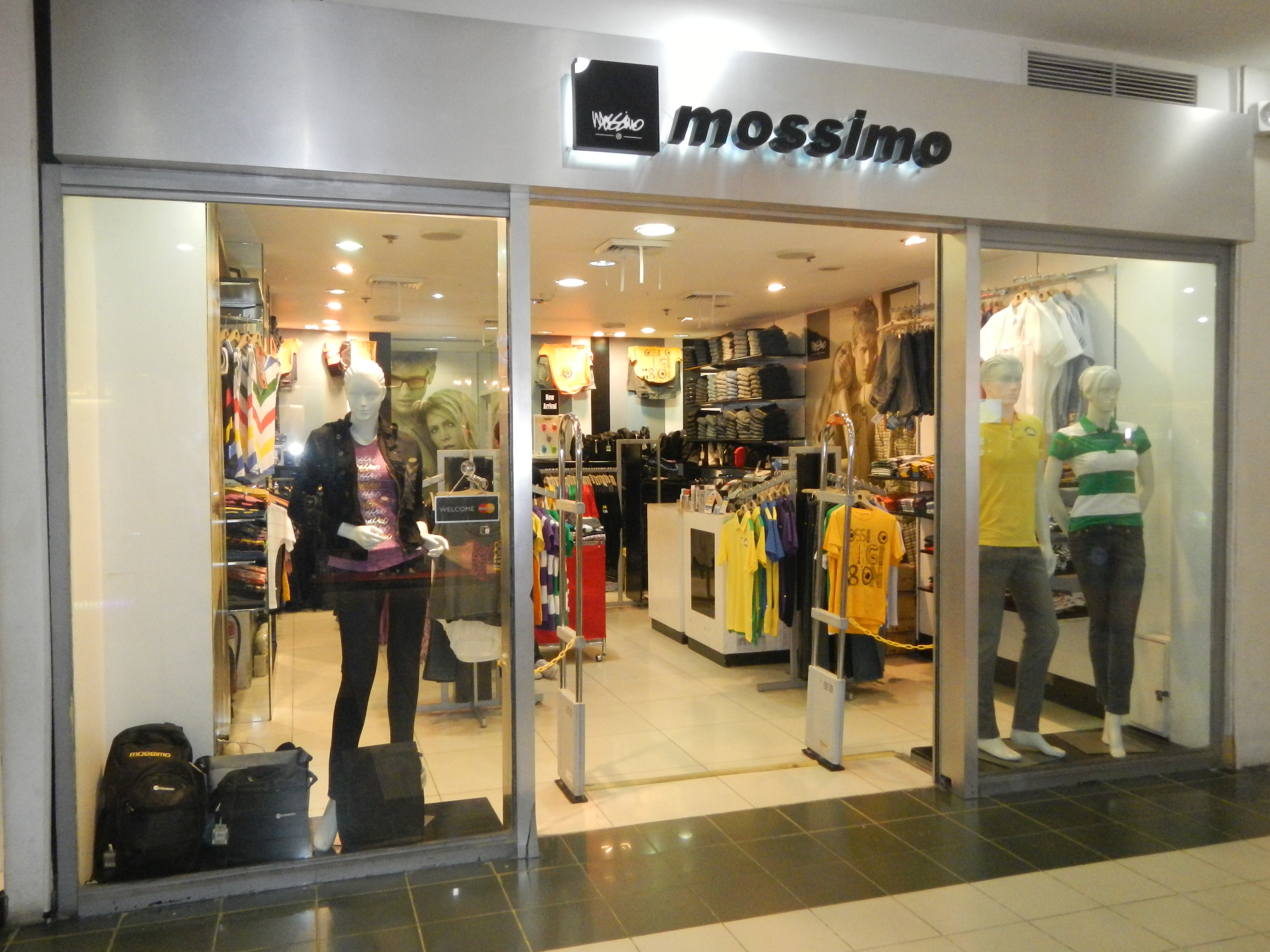
Mossimo store in Cabanatuan, Philippines

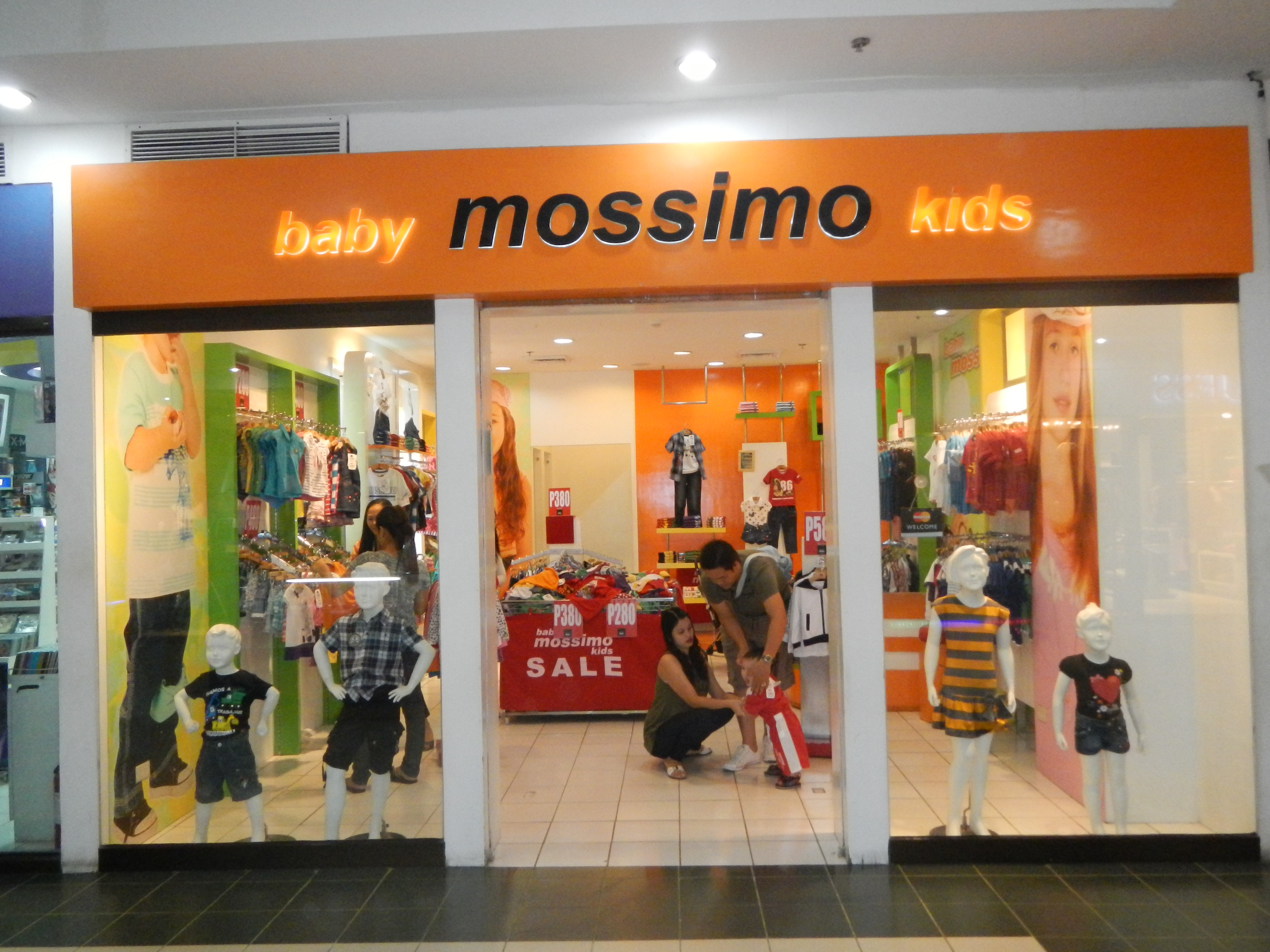
Baby and kids store

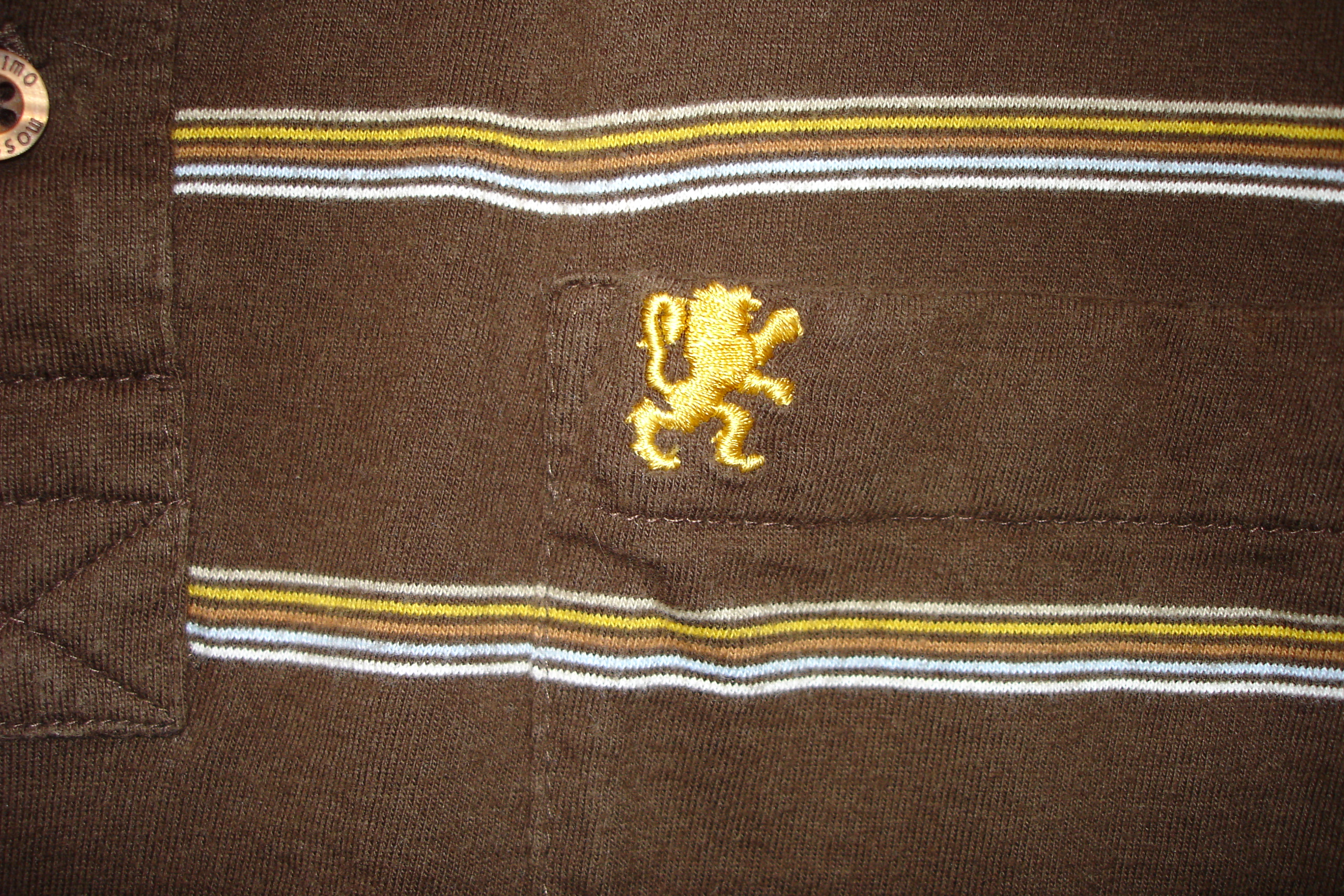
Embroidery
