= Michael Center =

American college tennis coach

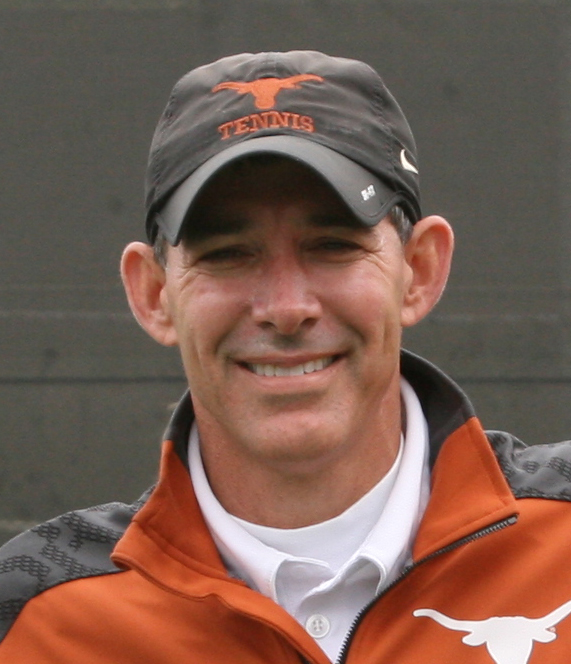
- Center in 2014

Biographical details
- Born: 1965 (age 60–61); Manhattan, Kansas, U.S.
- Education: University of Kansas

Playing career
- 1983–1986: Kansas

Coaching career (HC unless noted)
- 1989–1992: Kansas (women's)
- 1992–1998: Kansas
- 1996–1998: Stanford (assistant)
- 1998–2000: TCU
- 2000–2019: Texas

Accomplishments and honors

Championships
- 5× Big 12 Conference

Michael Center (born 1965) is a former American college tennis coach, motivational speaker, and author. He is best known for his tenure as the head coach of the University of Texas men’s tennis program, where he guided the Longhorns to five Big 12 championships, three appearances in the NCAA tournament national semifinals, and a national finals berth in 2008. Center later became an author and speaker, sharing his personal experiences of downfall and redemption following his involvement in the 2019 Varsity Blues scandal.

== Career ==
Michael Center won singles titles in Kansas before coaching the University of Kansas men’s and women’s tennis teams to four Big Eight championships from 1989 to 1996. He later served as head coach of the Texas Longhorns men’s tennis program from 2001 to 2018, leading the team to five Big 12 championships, three NCAA semifinal appearances, and a national finals berth in 2008.

=== Scandal and sentencing ===
In 2020, Center pleaded guilty to conspiracy charges in the Varsity Blues admissions scandal. He was sentenced to six months in prison, fined $20,000, ordered to forfeit $60,000, and placed under supervised release. Investigators found he had accepted a $100,000 bribe from Rick Singer in 2015 to falsely designate a student as a tennis recruit.

== Later career ==
In 2025, Center published a memoir, Breaking Serve: From Championship Coach to Prison, and the Journey Back, co-written with KU graduate Jeff Cravens. The book recounts his arrest and prison sentence during the 2019 Varsity Blues scandal and reflects on resilience and recovery. He later returned to consulting and motivational speaking.

== Personal life ==
Center lives in Austin, Texas, with his wife Allison. They have two sons.

== See also ==
- Texas Longhorns men's tennis
- University of Texas at Austin
- Varsity Blues scandal
- University of Kansas
- Big 12 Conference
