= Julie Buxbaum =

American lawyer, and novelist

- Born: 1977 (age 48–49)
- Citizenship: United States
- Education: University of Pennsylvania; Harvard Law School (JD)
- Occupations: Lawyer, novelist
- Writing career
- Notable works: The Opposite of Love; After You; What to Say Next; Tell Me Three Things; Hope and Other Punchlines; Admission

Julie Buxbaum (born 1977) is an American lawyer and novelist, who specializes in young adult novels. Her first two novels were written for adults, but Buxbaum has told interviewers she enjoys writing for a younger audience to connect with the sense of freedom open to younger readers.

Buxbaum's undergraduate degree is from the University of Pennsylvania, and she earned her J.D. degree at Harvard Law School.

Kirkus Reviews characterized her 2009 first novel, The Opposite of Love, as a "proposed merger of literary fiction with chick lit [that] contravenes the conventions of both genres." The Hollywood Reporter wrote that Anne Hathaway had been tentatively cast in a movie version of the book.

Several of her young adult novels revolve around topical events. The primary characters of Hope and Other Punchlines are both deeply affected by being born around the time of the terrorist attacks on September 11, 2001. The hero of Admission is embarrassed to learn their parents are accused of using bribery to get them into an elite college, inspired by the Varsity Blues college admissions scandal.

== Bibliography ==
- Julie Buxbaum (2009). The Opposite of Love. Bantam Trade. ISBN 9780385341233.
- Julie Buxbaum (2010). After You. Dial Press. ISBN 9780385341257.
- Julie Buxbaum (2017). What to Say Next. Random House Children's Books. ISBN 9780553535709.
- Julie Buxbaum (2017). Tell Me Three Things. Random House Children's Books. ISBN 9780553535679.
- Julie Buxbaum (2019). Hope and Other Punchlines. Random House Children's Books. ISBN 9781524766771.
- Julie Buxbaum (2020). Admission. Random House Children's Books. ISBN 9781984893642.
