= Lamont Smith (basketball) =

American basketball coach

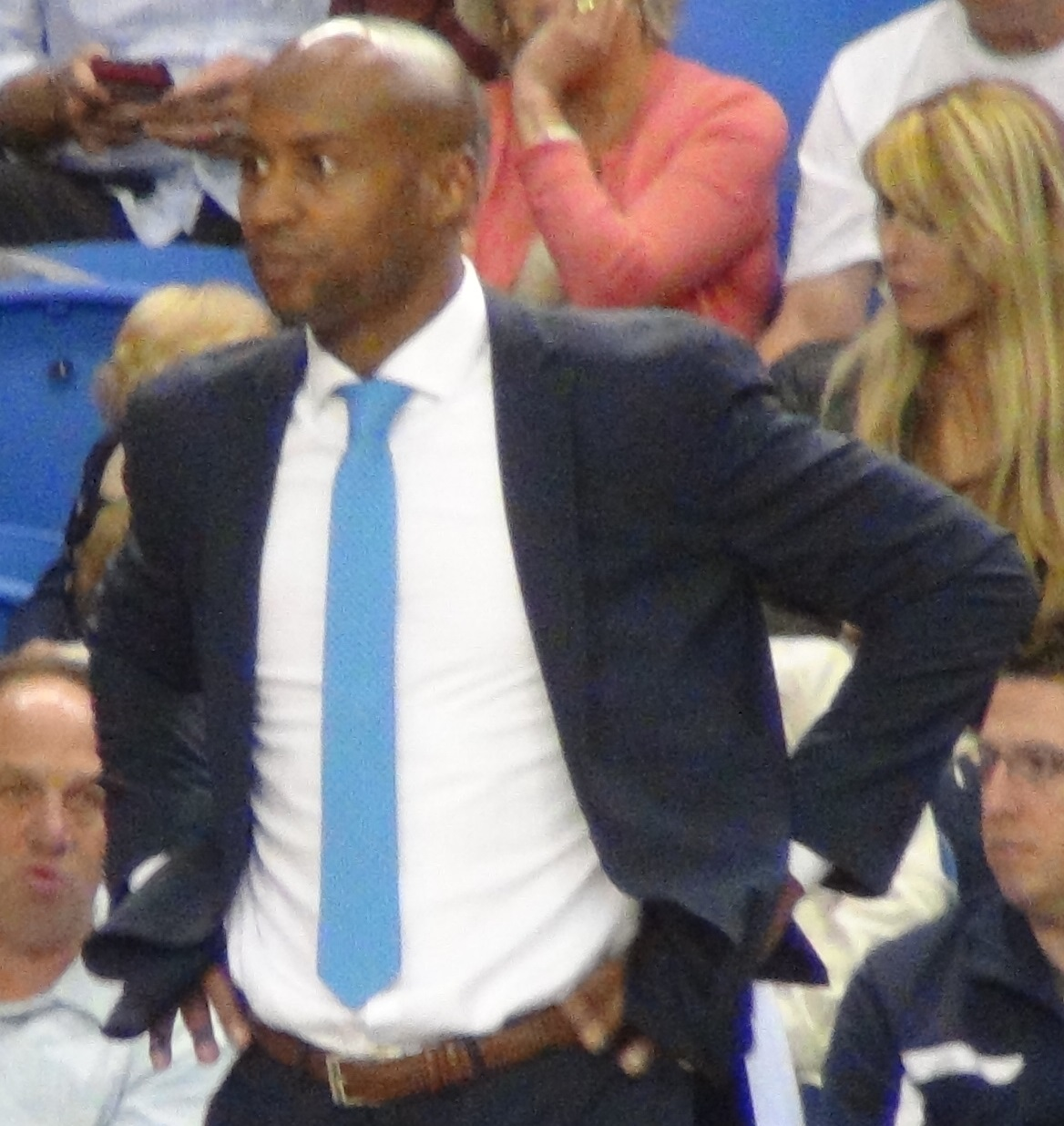
- Smith in 2017

Biographical details
- Born: October 19, 1975 (age 51); The Colony, Texas, U.S.

Playing career
- 1995–1999: San Diego

Coaching career (HC unless noted)
- 1999–2001: Saint Louis (asst.)
- 2001–2007: Saint Mary's (asst.)
- 2007–2008: Santa Clara (asst.)
- 2008–2012: Arizona State (asst.)
- 2012–2013: Washington (asst.)
- 2013–2015: New Mexico (asst.)
- 2015–2018: San Diego
- 2018–2019: UTEP (asst.)

Head coaching record
- Overall: 40–52 (.435)

Allen Lamont Smith (born October 19, 1975) is an American former college basketball coach, who was most recently an assistant coach at the University of Texas at El Paso for the UTEP Miners men's basketball team. He was previously the head coach at his alma mater University of San Diego, which he left in March 2018. Smith resigned from UTEP in March 2019 after the University of San Diego revealed that Smith was accused of accepting a bribe in the 2019 college admissions bribery scandal.

== Early life ==
Born and raised in The Colony, Texas, Smith played for the San Diego Toreros from 1995 to 1999. He earned team defensive player of the year honors in 1997 and 1999. Smith graduated from the University of San Diego in 1998 with a bachelor's degree in communications.

== Coaching career ==
Smith began his coaching career as a graduate assistant at Saint Louis. He was an assistant coach at Saint Mary's from 2001 to 2007, when he took an assistant gig at Santa Clara University. Smith was at Santa Clara for one season, and he left to fill an assistant position at Arizona State. At Arizona State, he helped develop James Harden and the Sun Devils experienced two 20-win seasons in his four years with the team. Smith became an assistant coach at the University of Washington in 2012 and spent one season on the bench with the Huskies. From 2013 to 2015 Smith served as an assistant coach at the University of New Mexico.

On April 1, 2015, Smith was hired as head coach of the San Diego Toreros. He takes over for the fired Bill Grier. "We're irrelevant right now in terms of basketball in this city," said Smith. San Diego went 9–21 in his first season of 2015–16 and improved to 13–18 in 2016–17. As of the last game he coached on February 24, 2018, San Diego was 18–12 (9–9 WCC), the most successful record during his tenure.

== Legal issues ==
San Diego placed Smith on administrative leave on February 26, 2018, a day after Smith was arrested at the Oakland International Airport on charges of domestic violence, assault with force likely to commit great bodily injury, and false imprisonment. The arrest was shortly before the team's flight back to San Diego following a win over San Francisco on February 24. Smith was released from jail on a reported $115,000 bail.

On March 7, 2018, Smith resigned after three seasons as San Diego's head coach, just hours after the domestic violence charges against him were dropped. A month later, on April 11, he was hired by Rodney Terry to be an assistant coach for the UTEP Miners men's basketball team.

Smith resigned from UTEP on March 20, 2019, after the University of San Diego revealed that Smith was accused of accepting a bribe in the 2019 college admissions bribery scandal for allegedly illegally helping a Beverly Hills real estate developer's children gain admission to the university. On November 13, 2020, Martin Fox was sentenced to three months in prison, three months of home confinement, 250 hours of community service, forfeiture of $245,000 and an additional fine of $95,000 after pleading guilty to bribing Smith. In March 2022, it was reported that of all of the coaches implicated in the 2019 college admissions scandal, which included Smith, Jovan Vavic was the only one of these coaches to challenge the charges brought against them in court, and, unlike Smith, the only coach to remain a defendant in the case as well. Unlike Martin Fox and other plaintiffs, Department of Justice does not list Smith as among those who were charged during the admission scandal's investigation.

== Head coaching record ==
Record table
Season	Team	Overall	Conference	Standing	Postseason
San Diego Toreros (West Coast Conference) (2015–2018)
2015–16	San Diego	9–21	4–14	9th	
2016–17	San Diego	13–18	6–12	7th	
2017–18	San Diego	18–12	9–9	T–4th	
San Diego Toreros:		40–51 (.440)	19–35 (.352)		
Total:		40–51 (.440)			
National champion Postseason invitational champion Conference regular season champion Conference regular season and conference tournament champion Division regular season champion Division regular season and conference tournament champion Conference tournament champion
