= Critical Mass (film) =

2000 low budget action film directed by Fred Olen Ray

- Promotional release poster
- Directed by: Fred Olen Ray (as Ed Raymond)
- Written by: Sean McGinly
- Produced by: Alison Semenza; Jim Wynorski
- Starring: Treat Williams; Udo Kier; Lori Loughlin; Blake Clark; Doug McKeon
- Cinematography: Theo Angell
- Edited by: Randy Carter
- Music by: Neal Acree
- Production companies: Mass Productions; Phoenician Entertainment
- Distributed by: Artisan Entertainment; New City Releasing; VCL Communications
- Release date: July 4, 2001; (Argentina)
- Running time: 95 minutes
- Country: United States
- Language: English

Critical Mass is a 2001 action film directed by Fred Olen Ray (credited as "Ed Raymond") and released direct-to-video. It stars Treat Williams, Lori Loughlin, and Udo Kier. The film features scenes taken straight from other films such as Terminator 2: Judgment Day and Universal Soldier spliced into newly filmed scenes to make up its action sequences.

== Plot ==
The film centers around a group of terrorists who take over a nuclear power plant and a security guard at the plant who tries to stop them.

== Cast ==
- Treat Williams as Mike Jeffers
- Udo Kier as Samson
- Lori Loughlin as Janine
- Blake Clark as Sheriff Borden
- Doug McKeon as Breem
- Andrew Prine as Senator Cook
- Richard McGonagle as Alan Gould
- Shanna Moakler as Alexandra
- T.J. Thyne as Karl Wendt
- Charles Cyphers as Henderson
- Jack Betts as Attorney General Ames

== Reception ==
Website Cool Target called it "enjoyable action nonsense" and stated: "Recycled footage to this extent is just lazy and kind of insulting but if you can get past this, Critical Mass is an enjoyably amusing low rent shoot-em up." Moria.co gave the film only one star out of five, calling it "yet another version on Die Hard (1988) and the basic plot template it created of a lone individualistic hero inside a large building/facility single-handedly fending off a terrorist plot."
