= Douglas Hodge (businessman) =

American businessman (born 1957)

- Born: Douglas M. Hodge; 1957 (age 68–69); New York, New York
- Education: Dartmouth College (BA in Economics, 1979); Harvard University (MBA, 1984)
- Known for: CEO of PIMCO; guilty of fraud in the 2019 college admissions bribery scandal
- Criminal penalty: nine months in prison

Douglas M. Hodge (born in 1957) is an American businessman. He is the former CEO of Pacific Investment Management Company (PIMCO), the world's largest bond manager. He pleaded guilty in October 2019 to the felony of conspiring to commit fraud and money laundering. In February 2020 he was sentenced to nine months in federal prison, and to pay a $750,000 fine and serve 500 hours of community service, for his participation in the 2019 college admissions bribery scandal.

== Early life ==
Hodge was born in New York, New York, and grew up in suburban Boston and Connecticut. He received an undergraduate degree from Dartmouth College (BA in Economics, 1979), and an MBA from Harvard Business School (1984).

== Work career ==
Hodge worked first as a bond trader at Salomon Brothers from 1984 to 1989.

He joined Pacific Investment Management Company (PIMCO) in 1989. Hodge initially worked for the company as a senior account manager and as a global product manager. He was in charge of the Asia-Pacific region from the company's Tokyo office from 2002 to 2009. In 2009, CEO Mohamed El-Erian named Hodge chief operating officer, telling him—according to Hodge: "You're the person I trust."

Hodge was chief operating officer from 2009 to 2014. In October 2012 he gave a speech at the Securities Industry and Financial Markets Association (SIFMA) Annual Meeting, entitled "Restoring Trust in the New Normal", in which he lamented that the financial industry had squandered the trust of the public with a series of scandals in the industry, with some in the industry having been guilty of "downright dishonesty". He concluding by saying that for the industry to restore trust,

"it starts at the top, with us, the leaders of the financial industry. Both as firms and as individuals, we need to personify trustworthy values... Willful violations of the rules should not be tolerated... [What is needed is] a stronger emphasis on ethics and integrity."

Hodge was chief executive officer of PIMCO, the world's largest bond manager, from 2014 to 2016. In 2014 it was reported that he had received an annual bonus of $45 million. He was also on PIMCO's executive committee, and on the global executive committee for Allianz Asset Management, the governing body of asset management for the Allianz Group. He retired in 2017.

He also served as an executive committee member and on the board of directors of the Securities Industry and Financial Markets Association (SIFMA). He was also a board trustee of The Thacher School in Ojai, California, since 2011, until March 15, 2019, when the school's Board of Trustees asked for his resignation.

== College admissions bribery scandal ==
In March 2019 Hodge appeared in US federal district court in Boston to face charges of conspiracy to commit mail fraud and honest services fraud, asserting that he allegedly paid over a half a million dollars in bribes so that three of his children would be admitted into Georgetown University and the University of Southern California (USC), as part the 2019 college admissions bribery scandal. He did not enter a plea. He was released on $500,000 bond. Assistant US Attorney Eric S. Rosen told the court Hodge was a flight risk with “unlimited resources,” and facing a maximum prison term of 20 years if convicted.

The allegations detailed how Hodge paid entities controlled by William “Rick” Singer (who has entered a guilty plea admitting that he was the ringleader of the scheme) and corrupt school officials, to bribe coaches and college officials to get them to present Hodge's children as sports team recruits, despite them not having the requisite athletic ability. Recruits had a better chance of being admitted, as compared to non-recruits with similar academic credentials.

Hodge first began paying Singer in 2008, when he wanted to have Georgetown University admit one of his daughters. Hodge's daughter then submitted an application to Georgetown asserting she had won a number of United States Tennis Association (USTA) tournaments, while in fact she had never played in a USTA match. The daughter was accepted to Georgetown with assistance from the tennis coach, who was also criminally charged, and she never played tennis at the university.

In 2013 Hodge used Singer again, this time to help another daughter get into USC. She was falsely presented to a USC committee as a soccer recruit who had played on a national champion tournament team, was co-captain of a Japan national team, and was an All-American. She was admitted into USC, but did not ever play soccer.

Also according to the affidavit, in December 2014 Hodge asked Singer by e-mail if his son, who was in high school, was “really qualified” for USC. He added: “He would go there in a heartbeat!!” Singer responded: “No but I can try to work a deal ... maybe Basketball or Football will give me a spot since their kids are not that strong.” The next month Hodge's wife e-mailed Singer that she could not find photos of the son playing football, but had pictures of his brother playing football. Singer forwarded the note to a then-USC assistant soccer coach (who is now criminally charged), writing: “See below — I am sure there is a tennis one too. The boys look alike so I thought a football one would help too?” Two days later, Hodge e-mailed a different USC athletic department official (who is now criminally charged): “We are preparing [my son's] 'sports resume' as you requested and should be able to send it on to you early next week.” His athletic profile during the admissions process stated falsely that he played varsity football as a sophomore through his senior season, was the varsity team's captain, and that he had twice been a New Hampshire “Independent Schools All-American Selection,” when in fact he had only played freshman football. The son was admitted to USC as a purported football recruit, but never joined the football team.

Singer wrote to Hodge in an e-mail: “Obviously we have stretched the truth but this is what is done for all kids. Admissions just needs something to work with to show he is an athlete,” the affidavit said.

Also according to the affidavit, in August 2018 Hodge called Singer to ask about getting his youngest son into Loyola Marymount University. The FBI had a court-ordered wiretap, and listened in, as Hodge told Singer: “We don't have to talk in code. We know how this works.”

According to the affidavit, in November 2018 in a taped call Singer told Hodge that his charitable foundation was being audited. Hodge assured Singer that “I'm not going off script here... That foundation has — its stated mission is to help underserved kids basically get into — you know, through — get through college. And that's all I'm going to say.” he paid a total of $850,000 to Singer.

The charges provide for sentences of a maximum of 20 years in prison, three years of supervised release, and a fine of $250,000 or twice the gross gain or loss, whichever is greater.

He pleaded guilty in October 2019 to conspiring to commit fraud and money laundering. In February 2020 he was sentenced to nine months in federal prison, and to pay a $750,000 fine and serve 500 hours of community service, as a result of the charges. He was imprisoned in the Federal Correctional Institution, Otisville and was released on 03/19/2021.

In February 2020, the Wall Street Journal newspaper published an Opinion piece written by Hodge titled, "I Wish I'd Never Met Rick Singer."
