= Operation Varsity Blues: The College Admissions Scandal =

2021 documentary film

- Promotional poster
- Directed by: Chris Smith
- Produced by: Chris Smith; Jon Karmen; Youree Henley
- Starring: Matthew Modine
- Distributed by: Netflix
- Release date: March 17, 2021
- Running time: 103 minutes
- Country: United States
- Language: English

Operation Varsity Blues: The College Admissions Scandal is an American documentary film about the 2019 college admissions bribery scandal. The movie stars Matthew Modine as Rick Singer and features reenactments as well as interviews with real people involved in the scandal.

== Cast ==
- Matthew Modine as Rick Singer
- Roger Rignack as John B Wilson
- Jillian Peterson as Lead FBI Agent
- Wallace Langham as Gordon Caplan
- Jeff Rector as Devin Sloane
- Courtney Rackley as Jane Buckingham
- Josh Stamberg as Bill McGlashan
- Jeremy Sless as Guidance Counselor

== Production ==
Production took place in 2020 with delays due to the COVID-19 pandemic.

== Release ==
The documentary was released on Netflix on March 17, 2021. The documentary was the seventh-most-watched film on the platform that week.

== Reception ==
=== Critical response ===
On Rotten Tomatoes the documentary holds an approval rating of 88% based on 51 reviews. Actor Matthew Modine's performance was well received, with Salon writing that his performance was a "convincing interpretation of Singer's intense physicality." Clarie McNear of The Ringer thought the documentary was "delicious" although it failed "to cover much new ground." Kelly Lawler of USA Today wrote that the documentary "lacks any uniqueness in its staid narrative."

=== Legal ===
On April 6, 2021, Netflix was sued for defamation by John B. Wilson and his family. The Wilson family alleged that the documentary misrepresented them by portraying them as guilty and complicit in the scandal. Wilson was convicted at trial. The First Circuit partially overturned the verdict on appeal. Wilson claims that before the release of the Netflix documentary, he provided them with evidence that proved his children earned their spot in their respective colleges. However, Netflix disregarded Wilson’s evidence, and portrayed him and his family as complicit in the scandal. In 2024, Wilson also filed a $75 million lawsuit against the University of Southern California for fraud and deceit.
