= Gamal Aziz =

Egyptian-American businessman

- Gamal Abdelaziz
- Born: 1957 or 1958 (age 68–69); Egypt
- Education: University of Cairo (bachelor's degree in business)
- Occupations: Former President and Chief Operating Officer of Wynn Resorts; Former President and Board Member of Wynn Macau; Former CEO of MGM Resorts International
- Children: 3

Gamal Aziz, also known as Gamal Abdelaziz (Arabic: جمال عزيز, born 1957 or 1958), is an Egyptian-American businessman. Aziz is the former president of Wynn Macau Limited and chief operating officer of Wynn Resorts Development. He was also the former president and COO of MGM Resorts International.

Aziz was one of the individuals accused in the 2019 college admissions Varsity Blues case. In May 2023, the First Circuit Court of Appeals issued a ruling clearing Aziz of all charges.

== Career ==
Aziz was born in Egypt, grew up in Cairo, Egypt, and resides in Las Vegas, Nevada. He earned a bachelor's degree in business at the University of Cairo.

He held senior executive positions at Caesars Palace in Las Vegas, the Plaza Hotel in New York City, the Westin Hotel in Washington, D.C., and the St. Francis in San Francisco.

Aziz helped Steve Wynn open the Bellagio, the most expensive US hotel ever built, as that hotel's senior vice president, a post he held from 1998 to 2000. He oversaw the food and beverage division.

Aziz was next president and chief operating officer of the 5,000-room, 10,000-employee resort MGM Grand, the largest hotel by rooms in the US, joining it in 2001. He was then president and chief operating officer of MGM Resorts International, and then MGM Hospitality in September 2010. In that position he helped finalize 27 hotel projects in leisure markets around the world.

In January 2013 Aziz was appointed president and chief operating officer of Wynn Resorts Development LLC, overseeing expansion opportunities. He next became president of Wynn Macau, Ltd., reporting directly to Wynn. In December 2015 Ecole hôtelière de Lausanne (EHL), a hotel and hospitality school, appointed him to its international advisory board. He resigned in September 2016 as president and as a board member of Wynn Macau.

Aziz has been CEO of Legacy Hospitality Group since January 2017, according to his LinkedIn page.

In March 2019, Aziz and others were named in a criminal complaint filed by the U.S. Justice Department and charged with conspiracy to commit mail fraud and honest services mail fraud as part of the 2019 college admissions Varsity Blues case. He was convicted in October 2021 and sentenced to serve one year and a day in prison, pay a $250,000 fine and perform 400 hours of community service, but the conviction was overturned on appeal. A three-panel judge issued the reversal after finding that a lower court had made missteps during Aziz’s trial. The Los Angeles Times reported that the 3-0 decision was a result of the charges against Aziz being “based on misapplications of the law, unsupported by the evidence presented at trial, or tainted by the introduction of evidence about other Singer clients whom Abdelaziz… had nothing to do with.” Circuit Judge Sandra Lynch commented that the way the evidence was presented created “an unacceptable risk that the jury convicted Abdelaziz and Wilson based on others’ conduct rather than their own.” As a result of the ruling, Aziz, who was permitted to remain free from prison pending appeals, became the only accused parent in the college admissions scandal to avoid punishment.
