= Bill McGlashan =

American investor and businessperson

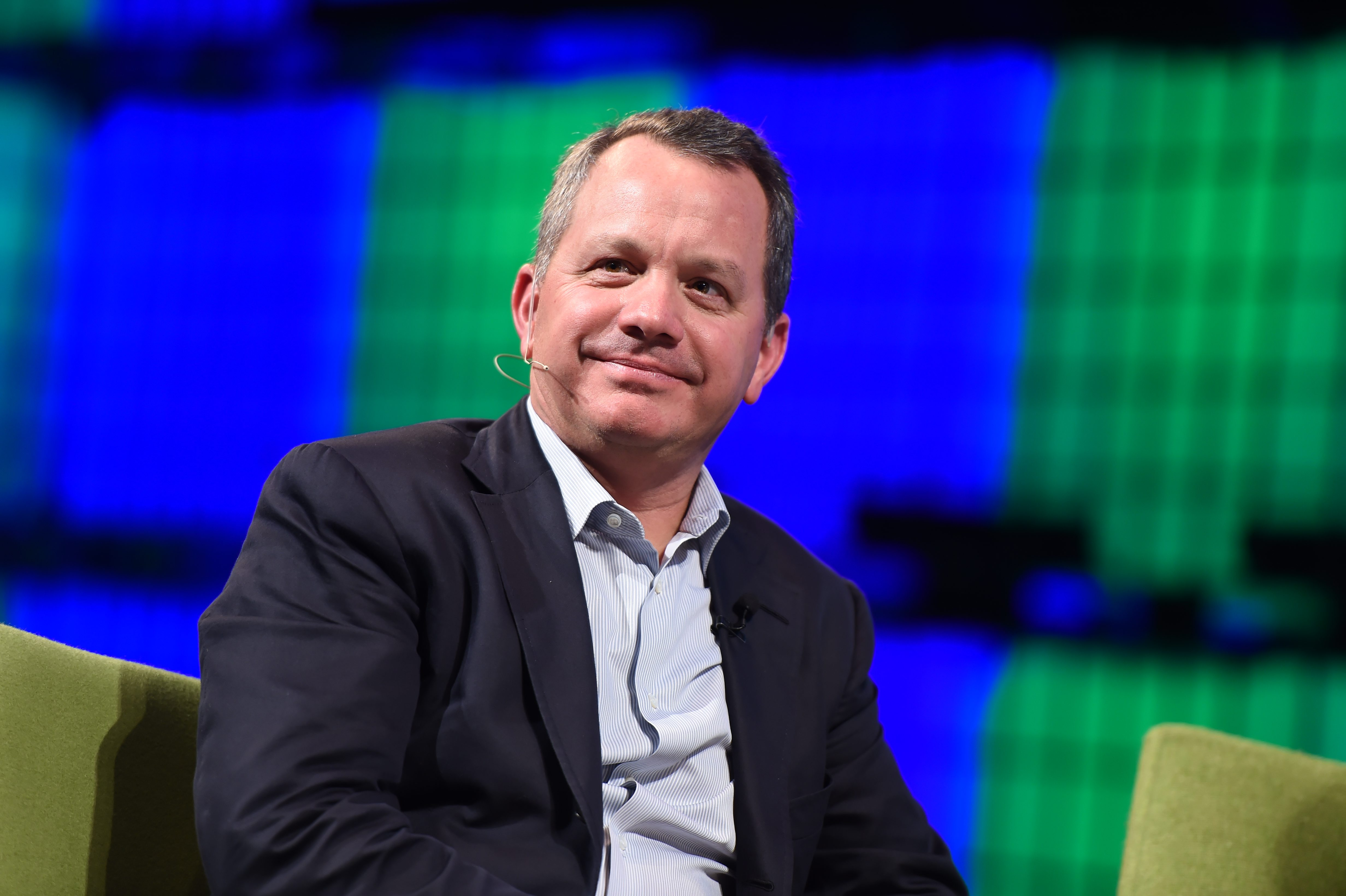
- McGlashan in 2014
- Born: November 20, 1963 (age 62)
- Education: Yale University (BA); Stanford University (MBA)
- Occupations: Founder and Ex-Managing Partner, TPG Growth
- Spouse: Marie Rasic McGlashan
- Children: 3

William E. McGlashan Jr. (born November 20, 1963) is an American businessman and former private equity investor. McGlashan founded TPG Growth, the growth equity and smaller buyout investment arm of TPG Capital, a global private equity investment firm. He is also a founder and was the initial-CEO of The Rise Fund, a social impact fund he co-founded with Bono and Jeffrey Skoll.

McGlashan is a co-founder and a former board member of STX Entertainment, an American film and television studio launched in 2014 with Robert Simonds, and a cofounder and director of Evolution Media Capital.

McGlashan was arrested on March 12, 2019, after being caught on FBI audio recordings, for participating in a college admissions bribery scandal. He was then fired for cause by TPG. He pled guilty in February 2021 to paying William "Rick" Singer to fix his son's test score. In May 2021, McGlashan was ordered to undergo a sentence which includes three months in prison and a $250,000 fine.

== Education ==
McGlashan earned a B.A. with honors from Yale University and an M.B.A. from the Stanford Graduate School of Business.

As a Stanford University business student in the late 1980s, McGlashan co-founded the World Service Project. The project's goal was to offer administrative and practical support to projects with a new model of multinational teams in such areas as environmental preservation and hunger prevention. The organization received support from U.S. Senators and Representatives, The Rockefeller Foundation, the U.S. Peace Corps and Nobel laureate Oscar Arias Sanchez.

== Career ==
Before joining TPG Capital in 2004, McGlashan was chairman and CEO of the micro-cap company Critical Path. He joined the email service company in April 2001, three months into an accounting scandal that caused Critical Path's stock to drop 75 percent, prompted two dozen shareholder lawsuits, and resulted in criminal charges against four executives. McGlashan was credited with keeping Critical Path out of bankruptcy, eliminating 87 percent of its debt, and settling the lawsuits within three months for $17.5 million, compared to the potential claim total of $240 million and delaying its NASDAQ delisting until shortly after his departure for failing to meet the minimum $15 million market capitalization requirement.

Previously, McGlashan co-founded and was CEO of Vectis Group, a venture capital firm that invested in emerging markets. Prior to Vectis Group, McGlashan co-founded and served as CEO of Generation Ventures, which focused on developing new healthcare and technology companies in China. In 1994, he co-founded and served as President of Pharmanex, Inc. In 1998, Pharmanex was sold to Nu Skin, an herbal supplement company. Earlier in his career, McGlashan was a senior associate with Bain Capital and Information Partners.

In 2013, McGlashan relocated temporarily with his family to Mumbai, India, to manage investments in India and Asia. He was said to be “the first global head of a premier bulge bracket (private equity) house physically making such a ‘transformative’ relocation”.

=== Board positions ===
McGlashan was active on a number of boards, including Fender Musical Instruments Corporation. (as chairman), XOJET (as chairman), Creative Artists Agency, HotSchedules, Elevance Renewable Sciences, Ride, e.l.f. Cosmetics, Brava, Seasoned, and Common Sense Media. He has also been a board member at Survey Monkey, SuccessFactors, Schiff Nutrition International, AgraQuest, and WIL Research Laboratories.

=== Non-profit organizations ===
Among non-profits, McGlashan has had board of director roles at Common Sense Media and is active with the Young Presidents’ Organization and the World Economic Forum, and had served on the Stanford Graduate School of Business Advisory Council. He is also the founder of The Rise Fund, a social impact fund started by TPG Growth in partnership with Elevar Equity. McGlashan was recognized for The Rise Fund, a $2 billion impact-investing initiative, in the 2017 Vanity Fair New Establishment list. Shortly before it launched, The Rise Fund scored a major investment from U2 lead singer Bono, who would also become McGlashan's Rise Fund business partner.

== Personal life ==
McGlashan is married to Marie Rasic McGlashan; together they have three children. The couple donated to Dominican Sisters Vision of Hope in 2017 and 2018. They have also donated to the Marin Agricultural Land Trust. He is the nephew of the former Marin County supervisor Charles McGlashan, who died in 2011.

=== Legal issues ===
On March 11, 2019, McGlashan, along with numerous others was arrested for his role in the 2019 college admissions bribery scandal. After a lengthy FBI investigation, the U.S. Department of Justice charged McGlashan with falsifying his son's test scores and attempting to secure his son's admission into the University of Southern California by bribing officials into enhancing his son's academic and athletic abilities in a sport he never played so his son's application would be more competitive and be eligible for the school's "side door" admission. A report by CNN stated that "McGlashan allegedly paid $50,000 to the charitable arm of the college prep group with the understanding that the company would correct his son's answers on the ACT." The allegation against McGlashan resulted in his being fired by TPG. However, McGlashan claims he was "initially put on leave” and “already had resigned” prior to being terminated for cause. However a recent Axios article recently stated, “It seems that McGlashan just can't avoid lying: There's no way he didn't know why his bosses wanted to fire him rather than allowing him to resign.”

On February 10, 2021, McGlashan accepted a plea deal, pleading guilty to one count of wire fraud, conditional on being allowed to appeal the judge's decision to not dismiss the wire fraud charge against him. He was sentenced to three months in prison and was also ordered to pay a $250,000 fine. Despite being given the option to withdraw his plea, McGlashan issued an apology to the court and voluntarily reported to prison on June 9, 2021, serving out his sentence. McGlashan unsuccessfully appealed the judge's decision in August 2023.
