= 1984 in science fiction =

The year 1984 was marked, in science fiction, by the following:

== Events ==
- The Janusz A. Zajdel Award, for Polish science fiction and fantasy, is established
- The 42nd annual Worldcon, L.A. con II, was held in Anaheim, USA

== Births and deaths ==
=== Births ===
- C. M. Kösemen

=== Deaths ===
- A. Bertram Chandler

== Literary releases ==
=== Novels ===
- Clay's Ark, by Octavia E. Butler
- Heretics of Dune, by Frank Herbert
- Native Tongue, by Suzette Haden Elgin
- Neuromancer, by William Gibson
- The Planiverse, by A.K. Dewdney

=== Comics ===
- 2001 Nights, by Yukinobu Hoshino, begins serialization in Monthly Super Action
- The first appearance of Bucky O'Hare, created by Larry Hama and Michael Golden in Echo of Futurepast #1

== Movies ==
- The Adventures of Buckaroo Banzai Across the 8th Dimension, dir. by W.D. Richter
- Dune, dir. by David Lynch
- Nausicaä of the Valley of the Wind, dir. by Hayao Miyazaki
- The Terminator, dir. by James Cameron

== Television ==
- Voltron

== Video games ==
- Elite
- The Hitchhiker's Guide to the Galaxy

== Other media ==
- Mekton - Role-playing game

== Awards ==
=== Hugos ===
- Best novel: Startide Rising, by David Brin
- Best novella: Cascade Point, by Timothy Zahn
- Best novelette: "Blood Music", by Greg Bear
- Best short story: "Speech Sounds", by Octavia E. Butler
- Best related work: The Encyclopedia of Science Fiction and Fantasy through 1968, Vol 3: Miscellaneous by Donald H. Tuck
- Best dramatic presentation: Return of the Jedi, dir. by Richard Marquand; written by Lawrence Kasdan and George Lucas; story by George Lucas
- Best professional editor: Shawna McCarthy
- Best professional artist: Michael Whelan
- Best Semiprozine: Locus, ed. by Charles N. Brown
- Best fanzine: File 770, ed. by Mike Glyer
- Best fan writer: Mike Glyer
- Best fan artist: Alexis Gilliland

=== Nebulas ===
- Best novel: Neuromancer, by William Gibson
- Best novella: PRESS ENTER ■, by John Varley
- Best novelette: "Bloodchild", by Octavia E. Butler
- Best short story: "Morning Child", by Gardner Dozois

=== Other awards ===
- BSFA Award for Best Novel: Mythago Wood, by Robert Holdstock
- Locus Award for Best Science Fiction Novel: Startide Rising, by David Brin
- Saturn Award for Best Science Fiction Film: The Terminator
