= McCaughan =

- Language: Irish

Origin
- Meaning: son of Eachán
- Region of origin: Ireland

Other names
- Variant forms: Eachaidh; Eachán; Mac Eacháin; Gahan; MacGaffin; McGaffin; MacGahan; McGahan

McCaughan is a surname of Irish origin. It is an Anglicised form of the Irish language Mac Eacháin, meaning "son of Eachán". The personal name Eachán is diminutive of the personal name Eachaidh, which is derived from each, meaning "horse".

== People ==
- Brandon McCaughan – (born 2003) – Irish racing driver.
- Charles McCaughan – American – actor and director.
- Chris McCaughan – (born 1977) – American – guitarist and vocalist in the band The Lawrence Arms.
- Darren McCaughan – American baseball player
- Mac McCaughan – founding member of the rock band Superchunk, and co-founder of Merge Records.
- Patrick Kinney McCaughan – (1844-1903) – New Zealand politician.
