= Mac Eacháin =

- Language: Irish

Origin
- Meaning: son of Eachán
- Region of origin: Ireland

Other names
- Variant forms: Eachaidh, Eachán, Gahan, McCaughan, McGaffin/MacGaffin, McGahan/MacGahan

Mac Eacháin is an Irish language surname. It is the patronymic form of the personal name Eachán. The personal name Eachán is diminutive of the personal name Eachaidh, which is derived from each, meaning horse.

Anglicised forms of the surname include McGahan (or MacGahan), Gahan, McCaughan, and McGaffin (or MacGaffin).
