= McGiffin =

McGiffin is a surname. Notable people with the surname include:

- Carol McGiffin (born 1960), English television and radio presenter
- Peter McGiffin, Australian cricket coach
- Philo McGiffin (1860–1897), United States Navy officer
- Roy McGiffin (1890–1918), Canadian ice hockey player

== See also ==
- McGaffin
- McGuffin
