= Clay's Ark =

1984 novel by Octavia E. Butler

- First edition
- Author: Octavia Butler
- Cover artist: Lee Wade
- Series: Patternist series
- Genre: Science fiction
- Published: New York City
- Publisher: St. Martin's Press
- Publication date: 1984
- Pages: 201
- ISBN: 9780312143213
- OCLC: 9896664
- Preceded by: Wild Seed (novel)

Clay's Ark (1984) is a novel by American science fiction author Octavia E. Butler. The last published of her Patternist series, the novel serves as a prequel that accounts for the arrival of the Clay Ark disease that leads to the evolution of clayarks, the mutants that threaten human survival in the series debut novel, 1976's Patternmaster, and 1978's Survivor, which Butler later disavowed.

== Plot ==
The novel is set in a near-future dystopia in which most people must live in gated communities or in armed nomadic groups called "car families". The novel traces the experiences of Blake Maslin, a physician living in Southern California, and his sixteen-year-old twin daughters, Rane and Keira. Traveling across the Mojave desert, the three are kidnapped by Eli Doyle, the only survivor of Clay's Ark, a spaceship that made an emergency crash landing in the desert on its return from the first human mission to another planet. Eli is infected with an alien microorganism that gives him heightened sensory and physical powers, but also directs his actions toward its own survival and transmission. He has assembled a "family" on a small isolated ranch, hoping to slow or stop the microorganism's transmission, but the urge to reproduce is so strong that he seeks out other humans to add to his family. Many infected young men or older women die of the disease, but infected women survive to give birth to sphinx-like offspring—intelligent quadrupeds with extraordinary speed. The mutants, eventually (in novels set later in the series) called clayarks, see uninfected humans as food but can also spread the microorganism through their bite. Blake, Rane, and Keira are infected and Eli expects them to join in the reproductive project of the community. Blake and his daughters flee, only to be captured by a "car family" with much more violent tendencies. Blake and Rane, drawn by the microorganism to seek out food and sex, are fatally injured by the "car family." Rane is decapitated, but Blake manages to escape long enough to infect a long-haul truck driver, making inevitable the spread of the disease through the rest of the country and eventually the world. Keira, having been cured of leukemia by the microorganism, reluctantly agrees to participate and returns with Eli to the ranch family, pregnant with her own mutant child.

== Characters ==
Major Characters

- Eli Doyle - The only survivor of Clay's Ark, the first crewed spaceship to reach another planet. He is a carrier of an alien virus. Eli is also a geologist.
- Blake Maslin - Keira's father, a doctor.
- Keira Maslin - The protagonist. She is battling leukemia.
- Rane Maslin - Keira's twin sister.

Minor Characters

- Andrew Zeriam - Lorene's boyfriend who commits suicide
- Badger - Clay Ark enemy
- Christian - Meda's brother
- Clay Dana - Inventor of the spaceship, a minor character from Mind of My Mind who had developed psychokinesis.
- Gabriel Boyd - Meda's father
- Grove Kenyon - A doctor in Clay Ark
- Gwyn - Meda's sister-in-law
- Ingraham - Lupe's husband Eli's friend who is affected with the Clay Ark disease
- Jacob - Eli and Meda's Clay Ark son
- Jorah - Blake's dead wife
- Joseph - Meda and Eli's Clay Ark son
- Lorene - Meda's sister-in-law
- Lupe - Ingraham's wife
- Meda Boyd - Eli's lover
- Smoke - Clay Ark enemy
- Stephen Kaneshiro - The newest male member of the Clay Ark community
- Zera - Lorene and Andrew Zeriam's Clay Ark daughter

== Reception ==
Kirkus Reviews praised the novel's "strong, supple narrative with tense action."

Joy Sanchez-Taylor argues that the novel and other of her works such as Fledgling hover between parasitism and mutualistic symbiosis since the aliens may confer powers, but at a price.

== Proposed film adaptation ==
On December 2, 2010, Deadline reported that Aron Warner was producing the feature film adaptation of the novel with Craig Fernandez writing the screenplay.

== Sources ==
- Sanchez-Taylor, Joy (November 2017), "Fledgling, Symbiosis, and the Nature/Culture Divide", Science Fiction Studies, 44 (3): 486–505, doi:10.5621/sciefictstud.44.3.0486.
