= The Evening and the Morning and the Night =

1987 short story by Octavia Butler

"The Evening and the Morning and the Night" is a science fiction novelette by American writer Octavia Butler. It was first published in Omni in May 1987, and subsequently republished in The Year's Best Science Fiction (fifth edition); in Best New SF 2; in Omni Visions One; in The Penguin Book of Modern Fantasy By Women; in Dark Matter: A Century of Speculative Fiction from the African Diaspora; in Daughters of Earth: Feminist Science Fiction in the Twentieth Century; in Crucified Dreams; in Butler's collection Bloodchild and Other Stories, and as a chapbook from Pulphouse Publishing.

== Synopsis ==
Decades after the introduction of a cancer cure, the children of its users develop "Duryea-Gode Disease" (DGD), a genetic disease whose symptoms include dissociative states, obsessive self-mutilation, and violent psychosis. DGD patients can delay the onset of symptoms by means of rigid dietary restrictions. However, the intense social isolation they face, as well as the knowledge that the eventual onset of symptoms is inevitable, makes some of the second-generation patients wonder whether these efforts are worth it.

Lynn Mortimer, the female protagonist, is a double DGD (she has the disease from both her parents), and learns how to deal with the disease and the oppression that she felt since she was growing up. She witnesses what DGDs are capable of when she visits Dilg, a retreat center where out-of-control DGDs are placed. At Dilg, instead of being restrained, the patients are engaged in making art and inventing technology.

In an afterword to the story, Butler described constructing DGD from the symptoms of three other genetic diseases: Huntington's disease, phenylketonuria, and Lesch-Nyhan disease, to which she added reactivity to pheromones and the delusion of being trapped in one's own flesh.

== Themes ==
"The Evening and the Morning and the Night" presents an atmosphere governed by social exclusion due to the affliction of DGD. A DGD patient's requirement to wear an emblem marks them as a liability to standard social constructs. Since DGD is an illness that facilitates self-mutilation and maniacal episodes of violence, people tend to stay away from those affected by the disease. This distance created by others not affected by this disease naturally causes prejudice and marginalization. Ultimately, the emblem DGD carriers wear signifies a population oppressed not only by their own genetic mutation, but also by the rest of society. Society thinks people with DGD can be problematic. Normal and sick humans are put in different groups, each with their own people. Each of the groups feel better interacting with their members. By law people with DGD are removed from their city and placed in a facility where disease sufferers are entrapped into their own world and labeled as if they were delinquents.

"So they had trusted God and the promises of modern medicine and had a child. But how could I look at what had happened to them and trust anything?" “Dilg is the retreat you try to send your out-control DGD relatives to”.

— Butler, "The Evening and the Morning and the Night," (402)

== Reception ==
Evening won the 1987 Science Fiction Chronicle Reader Award and was nominated for the Theodore Sturgeon Award, the Nebula Award for Best Novelette and the Locus Award for Best Novelette.

Jo Walton has described Evening as "chilling and astonishing", while John Clute calls it "harrowing".
