= McGahan =

MacGahan, McGahan
Origin
- Language: Gaelic
- Meaning: son of Eachán
- Region of origin: Ireland

Other names
- Variant forms: Eachaidh; Eachán; Gahan; McCaughan; Mac Eacháin; MacGaffin; McGaffin

MacGahan and McGahan are Northern Irish surnames. They are Anglicised forms of the Irish language Mac Eacháin, meaning "son of Eachán". The personal name Eachán is a diminutive of the personal name Eachaidh, which is based upon the Gaelic each, meaning "horse".

== People surnamed McGahan or MacGahan ==
- Andrew McGahan (1966–2019), Australian novelist
- Anna McGahan (born 1988), Australian actress and playwright
- Bronwyn McGahan (born 1972), Irish Sinn Féin politician
- Hugh McGahan (born 1961), New Zealand rugby league footballer
- Jamie McGahan (born 1959), Scottish cyclist
- Matt McGahan (born 1993), New Zealand rugby union footballer
- Januarius MacGahan (1844–1878), American journalist and war correspondent
- Paul McGahan (born 1964), New Zealand rugby union footballer
- Thomas McGahan (1845–1932), Australian politician
- Tony McGahan, (born 1972), Australian rugby union coach
- Walter G. McGahan (1902–1981), New York politician
- Holly McGahan (born 2002), New Zealand Teacher
