= Gaughan =

The surname Gaughan is the anglicized version of the Old Irish name O'Gaibhtheachain. The great gaelic scholar and genealogist Duald Mac Firbis (Dubhaltach Mac Fhirbhisigh), in his magnum opus Leabhar na nGenealach (Book of Genealogies), traced the family back as far as the race of Conn in the second century AD by way of Aongus Fionn (Aongus the Fair), the son of King Amhalgaidh of Connacht. In the Annals of the Four Masters, it is recorded that King Amhalgaidh died in 449 AD. Other derivatives of O'Gaibhtheachain are: O'Gaughan, Gaughen, Gavan, and McGahan.

== Family Crest ==
As in most coats of arms, this crest's components reflect the character of its people. In the Gaughan coat of arms, the blue symbolizes their loyalty and thirst for truth, while the white represents their love of peace and serenity. The fish signify charity towards others and a truthful conscience. Furthermore, they are also associated with a desire for Jesus Christ to be one's spiritual nourishment. The ornate helmet included in the coat of arms indicates that they were men of high rank or gentlemen.

== Sept History ==
The Gaughan "Sept" originated in the territory of Calry in the Barony of Tirawley in County Mayo and its members have lived there since at least the 5th century. Duald Mac Firbis's book, The Genealogies, Tribes, and Customs of Hy-Fiachrach, commonly called O'Dowda's country, which is the part of his Leabhar na nGenealach that focuses on the early history, lands and septs of the modern-day counties of Mayo, Sligo and South Galway (Hy-Fiachrach), contains an epic 231-quatrain poem that begins with the line "Many a branch of the race of Conn" and has a verse that reads:

"The O'Mollinas who refused not anyone,/(and) the Gaughans of the sharp spears,/Distributing lances to the troops,/Were the two chiefs of the Plain of Calry."

The genealogy of the Gaughans in Mac Firbis's "Genealogies" shows a direct line from "Conn of the Hundred Battles," the second-century High King of Ireland, down through Eochaidh Muighmheadhoin, the High King of Ireland in the fourth century and Fiachra, who was not only the founder of the Hy-Fiachrach (the descendants of Fiachra) but also the father of King Amhalgaidh in the fifth century who gave his name to the Barony of Tirawley in County Mayo (Tir Amhalgaidh).

In his History of the County Mayo to the Close of the Sixteenth Century, H. T. Knox mentioned the O'Gaughans three times. The first mention stated that sometime before 1154, an ancestor of the O'Dowda family was killed at Bearna Domnaill in Moyheleog by the O'Gaughans. This was probably in a conflict for territorial control of the Moy Valley, a broad region in North Mayo, which now includes towns like Ballina and Crossmolina and extends towards Belmullet.

Knox added a second incident from the Annals of the Four Masters, that "In 1180, Aedh O'Caithniad, lord of Erris, was treacherously slain by O'Callaghan at Kilcommon. Auliff O'Toghda (O'Dowda), chief of Bredagh, was killed by O'Gaughan, chief of Moyheleog. Murrough O'Lachtna was drowned in Lough Conn." Knox followed this short presentation of the three deaths ironically with the words, "Thus we get an occasional glimpse of what went on when the chiefs were not engaged on a larger scale."

The third mention in the Annals, dating from 1269, stated that "Flaherty O'Mollina, Chief of half the territory of Calry of Moyheleog, was slain by Gaughan, Chief of the other half."

== Emigration ==
During the numerous periods of massive famine in 19th-century Ireland, there was large scale emigration from County Mayo to both England and the United States. Probably the largest, single mass emigration of the Gaughans to the United States took place in 1883-1884, after the 1879-1881 "Forgotten Famine," through an assisted emigration scheme organized by James Hack Tuke, a Quaker who had also helped bring food and other assistance into Mayo during the Great Famine that lasted from 1845-1852. The emigration scheme also became known as the Blacksod Bay Assisted Emigration Sailings. On the website dedicated to those sailings, the names of 136 men, women and children of the Gaughan Family are listed along with the names of the ships they took and their ports of destination.

== The Irish War of Independence ==
Roll calls in the Irish Military Service Pension Collection of the Irish Military Archives show that 36 Gaughan men from the Barony of Erris in County Mayo alone served as volunteers during the Irish War of Independence: 11 in the Shraigh Company, nine in the Doohoma Company, four in the Tirrane Company, three in the Binghamstown Company, two each in the Dooyork, Doolough, Barahane and Corclough West companies, and one in the Belmullet Company. A plaque was installed at the end of March 2024 near the footbridge in Belmullet to commemorate the Gaughan Volunteers and hundreds of other men from Erris who fought for Irish Independence from England between 1919 and 1921.

In his book, Independence, the Struggle for Freedom in Erris, which contains copies of the roll calls, Thomas Gruddy wrote, "As my research progressed, it became clear to me that these ancestors of mine, as with so many of their comrades, did not have an easy life subsequent to their involvement in the local resistance. Many were forced to emigrate, endured much hardship and in some cases died at a young age... the very act of volunteering in the first place took courage. This is evidenced by the relatively low number of volunteers in the Belmullet town area, which was the centre of British administration in Erris."

The Cumann na mBan women's paramilitary and auxiliary organisation played an active role alongside the male volunteers during the War of Irish Independence, acting as couriers, collecting intelligence, scouting, providing safe houses and much more.

In her military pension application, Elizabeth Gaughan of Ballina presented evidence of her time as a member of 1 Battalion, North Mayo Brigade, Cumann na mBan under the command of Miss King, Mrs M Byrne and Mrs M Hickey. During the War of Independence (January 1919 – July 1921), she was engaged in drilling; parades; first-aid training; storing revolvers and ammunition for Jack Doherty and Joe Jordan after attacks on police in Knox Street, Ballina (late 1920) and Beckett’s Mill; dispatch work; procuring food and clothing for IRA men on the run and transporting revolvers and ammunition from Ballina to Corballa. During the Truce period, Elizabeth Gaughan stated that she procured food supplies and camping equipment for IRA training camps. Taking the anti-Treaty side in the Civil War, she transported ammunition from Central Hospital, Ballina to Corballa; reported on the movements of National Army troops; distributed monies on behalf of the Prisoners Dependents Fund and carried a dispatch from Ballina to Dublin.

== Notable people with the surname Gaughan ==
- Bernadette Strachan, née Gaughan, English author of popular women's fiction
- Billy Gaughan (1892–1956), English footballer
- Brendan Gaughan, American stock car driver
- Dick Gaughan, Scottish musician, singer, and songwriter
- Jack Gaughan, American Science Fiction Artist and illustrator
- Jack Gaughan Award for Best Emerging Artist
- Jackie Gaughan, casino owner and operator from the early 1950s in Las Vegas, Nevada
- John Gaughan, manufacturer of magic acts and equipment for magicians based in Los Angeles, California
- Kevin Gaughan, attorney and an advocate of government reform
- Michael Gaughan (businessman), casino owner and operator in Las Vegas, Nevada
- Michael Gaughan (Irish republican), Provisional Irish Republican Army (IRA) hunger striker
- Norah Gaughan, American knitting designer and author
- Norbert Felix Gaughan, American Catholic bishop
- Patricia Anne Gaughan, a United States federal judge

== See also ==
- Gaughran (disambiguation)
- Gahan (disambiguation)
