= Gaughran =

Gaughran is a name of Irish origin, and may refer to:

- Gaughran House (1900) in San Francisco, California, U.S.

== People with the surname Gaughran ==
- Benny Gaughran (disambiguation), multiple people
- David Gaughran, Irish novelist and public speaker
- Greg Buckingham (1945–1990) American competition swimmer
- James Gaughran (born 1932) American water polo player, and competitive swimmer
- Jim Gaughran (born 1957) American attorney and politician
- Laurence Gaughran (1842–1928) Irish Roman Catholic Bishop of Meath, Ireland

== See also ==
- Gaughan (surname)
- Gahan (disambiguation)
