= McGahn =

McGahn is a surname. Notable people with the surname include:

- Don McGahn (born 1968), American lawyer and White House Counsel and Assistant to the President
- Joseph McGahn (c. 1917 – 1999), American obstetrician and politician

== See also ==
- Bryan McGan (1848-1894) Australian cricketer
- McGahan
- Gahn
