= Unexpected Stories =

Speculative fiction collection by Octavia Butler

- Author: Octavia Butler
- Language: English
- Publisher: Open Road Media
- Pages: 95
- ISBN: 9781497601376

Unexpected Stories is a collection of two short speculative fiction works by Octavia Butler that was posthumously published in 2014. The collection includes A Necessary Being and Childfinder.

== Plot ==
=== A Necessary Being ===
Tahneh of the Rohkhon people is a Hao, a type of humanoid creature with blue skin and tall stature. Hao are considered to be natural leaders in the caste system of the story. Tahneh is the only Hao in her tribe; she has been unable to produce a Hao heir.

She receives a report that a young male Hao is traveling through Rohkhon territory. Her advisors encourage her to capture the boy and forcibly assimilate him, grooming him to be their next leader. Tahneh has reservations about the traditional methods of kidnapping Hao youth; she reminisces about her own father, a Hao man who was kidnapped and hobbled so he could never return to his birth tribe.

Diut, the young Hao, is captured by the Rohkhon. He escapes, fleeing through the Rokhon city and taking hostages. Tahneh and Diut fight, but refuse to kill each other. Tahneh proposes joining their two tribes and relocating to Rokhon to Diut's homeland. Diut accepts this offer.

=== Childfinder ===
A Black woman named Barbara has psionic abilities. Barbara is a childfinder who is assigned to find children with the capacity to develop psionic abilities. She splits away from the psionic organization that employed her due to racial tension, leaving them without a childfinder. Barbara uses her powers to train Black children and to snuff out the powers of white children. She is confronted by a white woman named Eve, but Barbara's students fight off Eve and her allies. Barbara erases her own memories of the existence of psionic abilities in order to prevent the organization from getting information about her students. In a postscript, a historian stated that psionic people died out from a natural disease rather than internal struggles, lamenting the passing of their utopian society.

== Major themes ==
A Necessary Being explores the issue of race through an allegorical caste system in which all characters have skin that is either yellow, green, or blue.

== Background ==
The events of A Necessary Being take place before the events of Survivor, the third book in Butler's Patternist series.

== Publication history ==
Butler wrote Childfinder and sold it to author Harlan Ellison in 1970. It was her first sale. It was originally meant to be published in Ellison's anthology The Last Dangerous Visions, but this work never came to fruition in their lifetimes. Childfinder remained unpublished for forty years.

In 2014, Butler's agent Merrilee Heifetz announced that she had discovered two new unpublished stories by Butler. This discovery was aided by archivists at Huntington Library in San Marino, California, where Butler's papers are kept. The stories were later collected and published as Unexpected Stories by Open Road Integrated Media.

== Reception ==
Publishers Weekly gave the collection a starred review, calling the stories "superb examples of [Butler's] craft". Kirkus Reviews gave the collection a positive review, noting that Butler's prose is not as sharp as her later works, but finding that it is a "small but important addition to [Butler's] ouevre".
