= Patternist series =

Novel series by Octavia E. Butler

First combined publication (Warner Books)

The Patternist series (also known as the Patternmaster series or Seed to Harvest) is a group of science fiction novels by Octavia E. Butler that detail a secret history continuing from the Ancient Egyptian period to the far future that involves telepathic mind control and an extraterrestrial plague. A profile of Butler in Black Women in America notes that the themes of the series include "racial and gender-based animosity, the ethical implications of biological engineering, the question of what it means to be human, ethical and unethical uses of power, and how the assumption of power changes people."

Butler's first published novel, 1976's Patternmaster, was the first book in this series to be released. From 1977 until 1984, she published four more Patternist novels: Mind of My Mind (1977), Survivor (1978), Wild Seed (1980) and Clay's Ark (1984). Until Butler began publishing the Xenogenesis trilogy in 1987, all but one of her published books were Patternist novels (1979's Kindred was the exception).

Butler later expressed a dislike for the novel Survivor, and declined to bring it back into print.

== Plot summaries ==
=== Patternmaster (1976) ===
This was the first book to be published but the last in the series' internal chronology. It takes place in a far future in which the human race has been sharply divided into the dominant Patternists, their enemies the "diseased" and animalistic Clayarks, and the enslaved "mutes," regular humans without any enhanced abilities. The Patternists, bred for intelligence and psychic abilities, are networked telepaths. They are ruled by the most powerful telepath, known as the Patternmaster. It tells the coming-of-age story of Teray, a young Patternist who learns he is a son of the Patternmaster. Teray fights for position within Patternist society and eventually for the role of Patternmaster. The novel explores the creation and maintenance of social and genetic hierarchies. For Gregory Jerome Hampton, Patternmaster "presents several questions about how race works in a social structure and how gender works in the function of race."

=== “A Necessary Being” (2014) ===
“A Necessary Being,” a short story found in Butler's papers written in the early 1970s but posthumously published in her Unexpected Stories collection, deals with the world explored in the repudiated Survivor before the humans arrive from Earth.

=== Mind of My Mind (1977) ===
Doro, a being who survives by transferring his consciousness from one body to another, using a breeding program has created a society of networked telepaths that he struggles to control. By the conclusion, Doro's millennia-long breeding program has succeeded, but he is killed in the process, and the first patternmaster takes his place as leader of the patternists, establishing control over the fictional city of Forsyth, California, which is still the seat of their power during the time of Patternmaster.

=== Survivor (1978) ===
Butler would later disown this work and would not allow reprints of it. As the Clay's Ark disease ravages the Earth, one group of baseline humans escapes Earth to a new planet. The story follows the group, including the protagonist Alanna, as they try to co-exist with the warring tribes of the native alien species.

=== Wild Seed (1980) ===
In terms of internal chronology, the series begins with the second to last published. During the 17th and 18th centuries, the immortals Doro (a man born in Africa thousands of years ago), encounters Anyanwu, a shape-shifting healer with perfect control over her body. They struggle to live together over generations as Doro attempts to create a new race via selective breeding program.

=== Clay's Ark (1984) ===
This novel, the last book of the series to be published, deals with a colony of people who have been mutated by a disease brought by astronauts brought to Earth from space. The group struggles to keep itself isolated enough to keep the disease from spreading throughout humanity.

== Themes ==
Butler on her goals in the series:

"I was trying to tell a good story about a strange community of people. I find myself doing that over and over again. That's not all I was trying to do. In each book, I was trying to do something a little different. But overall to gather these people and start this community that didn't work very well, if you noticed. There are people who think that they've won, so everything's fine. But they were really not very nice, the Patternists. When you get to Patternmaster, you'll see that. Really they were pretty awful. You wouldn't want to live in that society. And why were they so awful? Well, they were so awful because they had, shall we say, a bad teacher. And it didn't really occur to me until I had been working on the series for a while that I might have been making some comment on Black America. Once the thought came to me, I realized that I probably was commenting on Black America. Then I had to ask myself how I felt about that – that I was perhaps making a comment on learning the wrong thing from one's teachers. I realized that maybe it was something that I needed to think about and maybe it was something that I needed to say, so I certainly wasn't going to stop saying it or deny having said it."

== Omnibus ==
Wild Seed, Mind of My Mind, Clay's Ark, and Patternmaster were posthumously published together in this internally chronological order in the omnibus volume Seed to Harvest in 2007.
