= Benny Gaughran =

Benny Gaughran may refer to:

- Benny Gaughran (footballer, born 1915) (1915–1977), Irish soccer player
- Benny Gaughran (Gaelic footballer) (born 1945), his son, solicitor and Gaelic footballer

== See also ==
- Gaughran (disambiguation)
