= David Gaughran =

- Born: Dublin, Ireland
- Education: University College Dublin
- Occupations: Novelist, Public Speaker
- Writing career
- Language: English
- Years active: 2011-Present
- Genres: Non-Fiction, Historical Fiction
- Notable works: Let's Get Digital, Amazon Decoded
- Notable awards: Kate Wilhelm Solstice Award
- Website: davidgaughran.com

David Gaughran is an Irish indie publishing advocate and for his workshops, blog, and books: Let’s Get Digital, Let’s Get Visible, Amazon Decoded, Strangers to Superfans, BookBub Ads Expert, and Following. The Science Fiction and Fantasy Writers of America President Mary Robinette Kowal said, “David Gaughran has been doing yeoman’s work for years, alerting indie writers about predatory schemes and warning them about changes in independent publishing.”

Under his name, David M. Gaughran, he also writes historical fiction.

== Career ==
Gaughran has been featured in The Daily Telegraph, The Irish Times, The Guardian, The Irish Examiner, The Sunday Times, Huffington Post, Business Insider, Forbes, Mashable, The New York Observer, Newsweek Polska, il Giornale, The Star (Malaysia). He is a speaker for self-publishing and self-promotion, advocating for writers to publish and market their books. He's known for his outspoken view of the publishing industry, blogging about topics such as the tech hearings and what it means for independent publishers. Journalist Dawn Chmielewski covered the Amazon e-book pricing dispute and notes Gaughran's author interview supporting the retailer effort to keep prices low and build a healthy reading culture as "a piece worth reading." He was also featured in TechCrunch for discussing fake reviews on Amazon and the Techdirt exposé about services provided by Author Solutions. His reporting on the black hat tactic of "book stuffing" was featured in Pajiba.

== Awards ==
In May 2020 David Gaughran received the Kate Wilhelm Solstice Award, given by the Science Fiction and Fantasy Writers of America (SFWA) “for distinguished contributions to the science fiction and fantasy community.”

The Solstice Award was created in 2008 by the SFWA to acknowledge individuals, living or dead, who have had a significant impact on the science fiction or fantasy landscape, focusing on those who have consistently made a significant, positive difference to the speculative fiction field.

Previous winners include Octavia E. Butler, Alice B. Sheldon (AKA James Tiptree Jr.), Tom Doherty, Carl Sagan, Stanley Schmidt, Michael Whelan, Kate Wilhelm, Terri Windling, Donald A. Wollheim, John Clute, Sir Terry Pratchett, Toni Weisskopf, Gardner Dozois, Sheila Williams, and Neil Clarke (editor) and Nisi Shawl.

== Novels as David M. Gaughran ==
- Mercenary ISBN 978-91-87109-36-2
- Liberty Boy ISBN 978-91-87109-39-3
- A Storm Hits Valparíso ISBN 978-91-87109-04-1

== Self-published non-fiction ==
Non-fiction works about the publishing industry and self-publishing:

- Let's Get Visible: How To Get Noticed And Sell More Books (2013) ISBN 978-91-87109-16-4
- Strangers To Superfans: A Marketing Guide to the Reader Journey (2018) ISBN 978-91-87109-30-0
- BookBub Ads Expert: A Marketing Guide to Author Discovery (2019) ISBN 978-91-87109-32-4
- Let's Get Digital: How To Self-Publish, And Why You Should (2020, fourth edition) ISBN 978-91-87109-48-5
- Amazon Decoded: A Marketing Guide to the Kindle Store (2020) ISBN 978-91-87109-416
- Following: A Marketing Guide to Author Platform

== A Storm Hits Valparíso ==
David M. Gaughran's debut historical novel released in 2011 and is based around the South American Wars of Independence and the successful campaign of José de San Martín to liberate Argentina, Chile, and Peru from the Spanish Empire.

== Mercenary ==
His second historical fiction release in 2014 follows a real historical figure named Lee Christmas - a mercenary who was active during the growth of the banana industry in Honduras and subsequent U.S. intervention. Mercenary was recommended by Wall Street Journal bestselling author Michael Wallace, and Donald Barker at Reedsy Discovery called it a "story lifted straight out of history."

== Liberty Boy ==
Gaughran's third historical novel released in 2016 and surrounds the aftermath of the 1803 Rising in Dublin, Ireland and the execution of Robert Emmet, who was hanged and then beheaded on Thomas Street, Dublin in September 1803. Cindy Vallar at Historical Novels Review called it, a "tale of an overlooked rebellion, told from the perspective of the streets, with dialogue that is more heard than read and unexpected twists.”
