= Mind of My Mind =

1977 novel by Octavia E. Butler

- First edition (US)
- Author: Octavia Butler
- Cover artist: Jan Esteves
- Language: English
- Series: Patternist
- Genre: Science fiction
- Publisher: Doubleday (US); Sidgwick & Jackson (UK)
- Publication date: 1977
- Pages: 169
- ISBN: 978-0-385-12600-7
- OCLC: 2984449
- Preceded by: Patternmaster
- Followed by: Survivor

Mind of My Mind (1977) is a science fiction novel by American writer Octavia E. Butler. Mind of My Mind is the prequel to Butler's novel Patternmaster, and is the second novel in the Patternist series.

== Plot ==
This second novel in the series recounts the story of how the Patternist society originated. The novel is set in Forsyth, California, a city near Los Angeles, in the 1970s. The leader of the telepathic humans that later became known as the Patternists, was a man originally from Africa named Doro. Doro is about 4,000 years old and immortal. Since Doro does not have physical immortality, he must move his essence to different bodies as time goes on for his continued survival. Doro indirectly 'procreates' by controlling, selectively interbreeding and sometimes possessing the bodies of people who are telepathically sensitive (destroying the host's individual consciousness in the process), in an effort to make a group of psychically gifted superhumans he can achieve power through, who will also make him feel less alone in the world. The story is focused on one of Doro's daughters, named Mary, who is a young, poor biracial woman. Doro's hope is that his daughter Mary will connect with other telepaths and ultimately become an exceptional telepath who is able to link with other telepathic people.

In the midst of Mary's status change from a "latent" to an "active" telepath, she makes the first ever Pattern as a result of her attaching mentally onto six other active telepathic people. Two years later, after Mary has added 1,500 people to her community of Patternists, Doro thinks Mary has acquired too much power and demands that she stop acquiring telepaths. This creates a conflict, as Mary will destroy herself and as a result all Patternists if she discontinues the expansion of her Patternist community. With support from her people, Mary gains the strength to fight and ultimately kill Doro by adding him to the 'pattern' and draining his life energy. There are many Patternist casualties in the fight; however, Mary is ultimately able to continue to grow and protect the Patternist society she has created.

However, those who have read Patternmaster and Clay's Ark know that in a short time, the Clayark virus brought from an alien world will create mutated animalistic beings who cannot be telepathically manipulated and are compelled to infect others, leading to a dystopian future world where the two groups battle for control, and ordinary humans will have to choose between serving the feudal Patternist society or being absorbed by the anarchist Clayarks.

== Characters ==
- Mary: A young biracial woman from a poor neighborhood with a latent paranormal ability. Strong willed and independent. Daughter of Doro. Mary must overcome her Patternist father/lover. During Mary's transition from "latent" to "active" telepath, Mary creates the first Pattern by mentally latching onto six active telepaths. Mary eventually adds fifteen hundred people to her Patternist community. Mary's father Doro thinks that she has too much power and orders her to cease her additions of Patternists; Mary then kills her father.
- Doro: A four-thousand-year-old immortal originally from a region near the Nile River in Africa that he says was later called Nubia. Doro is the father (both literally and figuratively) of the telepathic group of humans who become the Patternists. Doro is eventually killed by his daughter Mary.
- Emma: A distant relative of Mary, previously known in Wild Seed as Anyanwu. She is immortal, a healer, and a shape-shifter. Emma agrees to let Mary and her mother, Rina, move into an apartment she owned to ensure that Mary makes it to adulthood at the request of Doro.
- Rina: Mary's mother. She is a sex-worker and an alcoholic. Doro uses Rina for his "breeding program" in hopes of creating a telepath better than all the previous ones he has sired. Having Mary has adverse effects on her mind.
- Karl: Mary's husband and an active telepath, Doro's strongest telepath until Mary goes through her transition.
