= Speech Sounds =

Science fiction short story by Octavia E. Butler

- Short story by Octavia Butler
- Genre: Science fiction

Publication
- Publisher: Asimov's Science Fiction
- Publication date: 1983

"Speech Sounds" is a science fiction short story by American writer Octavia E. Butler. It was first published in Asimov's Science Fiction Magazine in 1983. It won Butler her first Hugo Award for Best Short Story in 1984. The story was subsequently collected in Butler's anthology Bloodchild and Other Stories and in the science fiction anthology Wastelands: Stories of the Apocalypse.

== Plot summary ==
The world has been decimated by a mysterious pandemic: most survivors have lost at least one form of previously expressed communication, such as being unable to speak, understand speech, read, write or remember things well. People have also become prone to violence triggered by resentment of their own impairments and harbor jealousy toward the very few who are still able to communicate the old way and who, therefore, hide this ability.

Valerie Rye lives in Los Angeles; the disease has killed her parents, husband, sister, and children. Wracked by pain and loneliness, she decides to take a bus to Pasadena to join her brother, who is probably still alive. A fight breaks out on board, triggered by two passengers for trivial reasons. The bus stops and Rye disembarks as the violence escalates. An armed man in an LAPD uniform intervenes and restores order, and then invites Rye to get into his car. Rye initially refuses for fear of the weapon and baffled by the uniform, knowing full well that the police have long been disbanded. However, she is reassured by the gestures of the man, whose singling out of her has made her a target for the other passengers, so she accepts his offer. With difficulty, having lost the ability to read and write and, therefore, to interpret the road map, Rye manages to make the man understand that she wants to go towards Pasadena. Rye was a former teacher and loved reading, and feels a murderous jealousy upon realizing that the man still knows how to read, but manages to repress it. Rye in turn reveals to the man that she can speak. They exchange name signs, her a pin of a bushel of grain and him a small black rock. Rye chooses to refer to him as Obsidian as it is a name she can better remember, while humorously considering he is as likely to think of her name as Wheat instead of Rye. The two share an intimate moment and have sex once the man is able to assuage Rye’s concerns about pregnancy. Rye asks the man to return to Los Angeles with her, and he reluctantly agrees.

Along the way, a woman runs out in front of their car, chased by a man brandishing a knife. “Obsidian” intervenes, but he is unable to prevent the woman's killing and shoots the man. “Obsidian” clumsily checks on the wounded man, who grabs the holstered gun and kills “Obsidian” before Rye’s own shot kills the man. Two crying children come out of a nearby house, apparently the dead woman's children. Rye intends to ignore the children, but her sense of responsibility takes over. The two children are able to speak, and Rye, now hopeful for the future, welcomes them.

== Themes ==
Communication

Everyone has to use symbols that represent their name as forms of identification. Rye uses a pin in the shape of a stalk of wheat (the closest thing to "rye"), and Obsidian uses a black rock. We learn that "Rye" is actually our protagonist's last name; her first name is Valerie. Rye, going by just her last name, represents the limitations of communication in society. We also do not know if "Obsidian" is actually his name; Rye assumes it from the black rock token he shows her. The limited nonverbal communication in society causes most people to harbor intense jealousy, rage, and aggression. The fight on the bus was initiated by one wrong look. There is even a hierarchical aspect in the abilities still retained among everyone; left-handed people are seen as more intellectual and less prone to aggression and irrationality.

The entire story is guided by gestures, from the mock throwing of punches between the men on the bus to Obsidian's gentle touch with Rye in the car. Some male bus passengers use obscene gestures in the first half of the story, a lot of which now represent the new society's versions of curse words.

Survival

The frustrations of wide swaths of the world population suddenly losing previous forms of communication has led to societal breakdown resembling a post-apocalyptic society. Rye carries a gun with her at all times for this reason. Rye has learned to be a quick thinker, knowing exactly what to do when the fight on the bus breaks out, like stopping herself from getting hurt and getting off the bus as soon as she could. Any sense of normalcy and protection has diminished; any sort of transportation can be used as weapons (hence the lack of cars and Rye's surprise when a bus turned up), and organizations such as the LAPD have ceased to exist. When she first encounters Obsidian, dressed in an LAPD officer’s uniform, she was wary of his intentions, fearing he might harm her. The children Rye saves at the end of the story have also learned to protect themselves at a young age. When Rye attempts to retrieve the body of the woman, the sister of the pair tells her "No! Go away!," and the brother reprimands her for speaking out loud to a stranger; he is aware that if people know they can speak, they can be in serious danger.
