= Survivor (Butler novel) =

1978 novel by Octavia E. Butler

- First edition (US)
- Author: Octavia Butler
- Language: English
- Series: Patternist series
- Genre: Science fiction
- Publisher: Doubleday (US); Sidgwick & Jackson (UK)
- Publication date: 1978
- Publication place: United States
- Media type: Print
- Pages: 185
- ISBN: 0-385-13385-5
- OCLC: 3480629
- Dewey Decimal: 813/.5/4
- LC Class: PZ4.B98674 Su PS3552.U827
- Preceded by: Mind of My Mind
- Followed by: Wild Seed

Survivor is a science fiction novel by American writer Octavia E. Butler. First published in 1978 as part of Butler's "Patternist series", Survivor is the only one of Butler's early novels not to be reprinted after its initial editions. Butler expressed dislike for the work, referring to it as "my Star Trek novel."

A new edition including the short story "A Necessary Being" will be published September 2026.

== Plot introduction ==
Survivor follows the early contact between the Missionaries, a group of human colonists fleeing a plague on Earth, and the Kohn, intelligent natives of the planet on which the Missionaries have arrived. In particular, the novel focuses on Alanna, the adopted daughter of the Missionaries' leader, as she attempts to prevent the Missionaries' destruction or assimilation at the hands of a dominant local culture. During the course of the novel, Alanna's experiences assimilating and negotiating with the Kohn draw upon her earlier, similar experience joining the Missionaries themselves, and Alanna's ability to interact with the various cultures becomes the key to their survival.

== Plot summary ==
Although set within the broader plot of the Patternist series, the entire plot of Survivor is largely separated from the events of the other books in the series.

Butler begins the novel in medias res, during the "rescue" of the main character, Alanna, from the "Tehkohn," a group of extraterrestrials. Although the main narrative follows Alanna's perspective after the rescue, Butler also inserts a series of flashbacks, some of them from the perspective of other characters. Through this literary device, the readers learn about Alanna's past gradually, even as they follow the efforts of the other characters to discover that past as well.

Eventually, the narrative reveals Alanna's background. The novel is set in the indeterminate future, sometime after the events that Butler would later describe in her novel Clay's Ark and before the events of Patternmaster. At the time of Survivor, humanity is threatened by the "Clayark plague," an extraterrestrial disease that has destroyed half of the Earth's population, either by killing them or by mutating them and their children into the bestial "Clayarks." Humanity survives in an embattled state, supported somewhat by the "Patternists," a group of mutant humans previously living in secret. (The development of the Patternists is described in more detail in Wild Seed and Mind of My Mind, and a later stage of their conflict against the Clayarks is described in Patternmaster.)

Prior to the main events of the novel, Alanna's parents died saving her from a Clayark attack. After several years living as a feral child, Alanna was captured by a group of Missionaries, a Christian religious sect dedicated to maintaining humanity as God's chosen form in the face of Clayark and Patternist competition. Although some of the Missionaries distrusted Alanna, either because of her wild upbringing or because of her African American and Asian ancestry, she adapted quickly, and became the foster daughter of the group's leader, Jules Verrick, and his wife Niela. Some time later, the Missionaries receive an opportunity to flee Earth on a Patternist starship as part of a program to seed humanity on other planets in order to preserve the species from the Clayark plague.

After arrival on the planet, the Missionaries encountered the Kohn, intelligent inhabitants of the planet. Although the Kohn had fur, camouflage abilities, and claws, they were broadly humanoid, and the local tribe—the Garkohn—assisted the Missionaries in developing their settlement. Shortly thereafter, the settlement was raided by the Tehkohn, a rival group of Kohn, and several Garkohn and Missionaries were captured, including Alanna.

Eventually, the story reveals that just as Alanna once altered her behavior to fit in among the Missionaries and "survive," she also was successful in joining the Tehkohn, ultimately marrying their leader, Diut, and bearing a child. Through her experiences with the Tehkohn, Alanna has learned that the Garkohn have addicted the Missionaries to a plant under their control and intend to assimilate the physically weaker Missionaries and use their technology against the Tehkohn.

Aware that she will lose the humans' trust if they realize she is in a relationship with a native, Alanna plays a dangerous game, but is ultimately largely successful, leading the Missionaries to trust (reluctantly) the Tehkohn long enough to escape the influence of both native nations with the Tehkohn's help. At that point, Alanna reveals her relationship to the other humans, is disowned by her father, and returns to live with the Tehkohn.

== Characters ==
=== Alanna ===
Alanna serves as the novel's lead character, as well as the narrator for most of the novel. Within the novel, Alanna reveals her past in stages, both to the other characters, and, through her woven narrative, to the reader. Orphaned during an attack by the bestial Clayarks, Alanna lived for several years as a feral child, before being found by the "Missionaries" — a Christian group dedicated to preserving humanity in the face of the Clayark threat. A social chameleon, Alanna is able to adapt to the Missionaries' social norms, becomes a member of their group, and is adopted by Jules Verrick, the leader of the Missionaries.

Later, after Verrick's group leaves Earth and encounters the extraterrestrial "Kohn," Alanna is captured by the "Tehkohn," one of two rival Kohn tribes. Again, she is able to adapt, and becomes a member of the Tehkohn, ultimately marrying Diut, the Tehkohn's leader or Hao. After her return to the Missionaries, Alanna uses her membership in both groups and her ability to function as a social chameleon to free the Missionaries from the control of the two Kohn tribes. However, her father is ultimately unable to accept her relationship with Diut and Alanna returns to the Tehkohn, her new people.

According to Butler, Alanna was her first attempt at writing "a character as big as I am . . . not necessarily fat, but she's very tall and androgynous-looking."

=== Diut ===
Diut is a Tehkohn Hao. The Kohn have a natural hierarchy that is based on shades of blue. The darker the shade of blue of their fur, the higher their rank or status within the community. A "Hao" is a Kohn with a very dark shade of blue. The Kohn use their colors to communicate many different things. This dark shade garners obedience from all Kohn, Tehkohn and Garkohn.

As a result, Diut has been literally born to lead, and is not accustomed to having his instructions refused. Alanna's strangeness and her willingness to disagree with him initially lead to conflict, but by the time of Alanna's "rescue," have led the two into an apparently stable romantic relationship.

At the beginning of Survivor, Diut has already realized that the Garkohn hope to assimilate the Missionaries into their tribe, addicting the Missionaries to a local drug and using the Missionaries' technology to gain an advantage over the Tehkohn. Because of his love for Alanna, Diut agrees to assist the Missionaries in escaping to an area where they will be free to set up their own society, rather than capturing them or killing them to prevent the Garkohn from using them.

=== Jules Verrick ===
Jules Verrick is the leader of the Missionaries. Formerly a slave to the telepathic branch of humanity known as the "Patternists," Jules has the strength of will to protect the Missionaries from and the sensitivity to adopt Alanna, notwithstanding other Missionaries' concerns about the cross-racial adoption. Although Jules does not realize the threat presented by the Missionaries' Garkohn allies at the beginning of the novel, he is strong-willed and flexible enough to defeat the physical addiction that the Garkohn have forced upon him and to ally with Diut and the Tehkohn once he recognized the threat. Despite this flexibility and his apparent love for Alanna, Jules is unable to accept Alanna's relationship with Diut, who he continues to perceive as a "non-human." As a result, he and Alanna separate at the end of the novel, with uncertain prospects for any reunion.

== Major themes ==
As with many of Butler's other works, several writers have considered the themes of race in Survivor. Within the novel, Butler deliberately delays revealing Alanna's ethnic background, revealing her African-American and Asian ancestry only in a flashback after the character has been established. (Butler uses a similar technique with her protagonists in Dawn and Parable of the Sower.)

Numerous writers have analyzed Survivor as a metaphor for race, particularly for the experiences of African Americans during the time period in which the novel was written and published, and as a metaphor for racial relations. Alanna, herself a combination of her African American and Asian parents, is placed in a position of having to negotiate with and integrate into three groups: the predominantly white Missionaries, and two groups of Kohn, Canaan natives who are literally "people of color" - who determine their social status and hierarchies primarily through the color of their fur.

Like many of Butler's works, Survivor also contains a strong theme of assimilation. At the beginning of the novel, Alanna has joined the Missionary community and learned to live as a member of that community without losing the skills and traits that she learned from her parents or from her feral youth. Later, this same ability to assimilate while maintaining her own identity allows Alanna to become a full member of the Tehkohn, and to use this membership to assist the Missionaries in evading their own (forced) assimilation into Garkohn society.

== Allusions/references to other works ==
Survivor contains numerous references that ground it within Butler's Patternist series of novels. Although Alanna never describes meeting either the mutated Clayarks or their main opponents, the "Patternist" psychics, the events in Survivor describe an earlier stage of the same conflict described in Butler's earlier novel, Patternmaster.

== Literary significance and criticism ==
Butler called Survivor the least favorite of her works, criticizing its premise as an offensive science fiction cliché:

When I was young, a lot of people wrote about going to another world and finding either little green men or little brown men, and they were always less in some way. They were a little sly, or a little like "the natives" in a very bad, old movie. And I thought, "No way. Apart from all these human beings populating the galaxy, this is really offensive garbage." People ask me why I don't like Survivor, my third novel. And it's because it feels a little bit like that. Some humans go up to another world, and immediately begin mating with the aliens and having children with them. I think of it as my Star Trek novel.

The latest English reprint of the novel took place 1981, three years after its first publication. Translations into other languages appear until 1994. A new English edition will be published September 2026.
