= Lilith's Brood =

Book collection by Octavia E. Butler

- First combined edition publ. GuildAmerica Books
- Dawn; Adulthood Rites; Imago
- Author: Octavia E. Butler
- Cover artist: Pat Morrissey
- Country: United States
- Language: English
- Genre: Science fiction
- Publisher: Grand Central Publishing
- Published: 1987–1989
- No. of books: 3

Lilith's Brood, previously known as the Xenogenesis Trilogy, is a collection of three science fiction works by Octavia E. Butler: Dawn, Adulthood Rites, and Imago.

The books were previously collected in the now out-of-print omnibus edition Xenogenesis. The collection was republished under the current title of Lilith's Brood in 2000. A 2025 collection of the books published by the Library of America combines the series names as Lilith's Brood: The Xenogenesis Trilogy.

== Synopsis ==
=== Dawn (1987) ===
The first novel in the trilogy, Dawn, begins with Lilith Iyapo, a Black human woman, alone in what appears to be a prison cell. She has memories of this happening before, with an enigmatic voice that asks strange questions. She has no idea who this is or what they want. She remembers a nuclear war and an earlier traffic accident in which her husband and child had been killed.

The truth emerges in stages. The same questions are asked. She is then visited by humanoid beings whose appearance terrifies her, even though they behave well. She learns that the nuclear war had left the Earth uninhabitable. Humans are all but extinct. The few survivors were plucked from the dying Earth by an alien race, the Oankali. Lilith has awakened 250 years after the war on a living Oankali ship.

At first, she is repulsed by the alienness of her saviors/captors. The Oankali have sensory tentacles all over their bodies, including locations of human sensory organs, with which they perceive the world differently than humans. Stranger still, the Oankali have three sexes: male, female, and ooloi. While all Oankali have the ability to perceive genetic biochemistry, ooloi can consciously manipulate this biochemistry. Ooloi can mutate other beings and build offspring from their mates' genetic material.

Lilith eventually bonds to Nikanj, an ooloi. The Oankali have made Earth habitable and obtain Lilith's help in Awakening and training humans to survive on the changed Earth. In exchange, the Oankali want to interbreed with the humans to blend the human and Oankali races, a biological imperative they compare to a human's need to breathe. They perceive the interbreeding as mutually beneficial; in particular, it will solve what the Oankali think is the humans' fatal combination of intelligence and hierarchical tendencies. They are particularly attracted to humans' "talent" for cancer, which they will use to reshape themselves. The humans rebel against Lilith and the proposed "gene trade," and kill Joseph, Lilith's new mate. This group is sent to Earth without her. Nikanj uses Joseph's collected DNA to impregnate Lilith with the first Oankali/human child.

=== Adulthood Rites (1988) ===
The second book, Adulthood Rites, takes place years after the end of Dawn. Humans and Oankali live together on Earth, but not in complete peace. Some humans have accepted the bargain and live with the Oankali, giving birth to hybrid children called "constructs." Others, however, have refused the bargain and live in separate, all-human, "resister" villages. The ooloi have made all humans infertile, so the only children born are those made with ooloi intervention. This creates a great deal of tension and strain as the humans consider their lives meaningless without reproduction, especially as they see themselves being outbred by the Oankali-human constructs. Desperate humans often steal human-looking construct children to raise as their own.

The main character of this book, Akin, is the first male construct born to a human mother (Lilith). Akin has more human in him than any construct before him. Adulthood Rites focuses on Akin's struggle with his human and Oankali heritage. As a human, he understands the desire to fight for the survival of humanity as an independent race. As an Oankali he understands that the combination of the species is necessary and that humans would destroy themselves again if left alone. Akin is kidnapped by the resisters as an infant, when the only evidence of his construct status is a tentacle-like tongue through which he samples his world in the Oankali manner of identifying DNA. The Oankali allow the resisters to keep him for a sustained period of time so that he might understand his human nature more fully, but at the cost of the connection to his paired sibling that would have happened had he stayed with his family. His isolation is hugely painful to them both, and he is taken to the orbiting ship to experience whatever healing he and his insufficiently paired sibling can be granted. During that time, he travels around the ship with an Akjai, an Oankali who has no human DNA.

Through these experiences, he realizes that humans, too, need an Akjai group, and his conviction ultimately persuades the Oankali. Humans will be given Mars, modified sufficiently to (barely) support human existence, despite the Oankali certainty that the Mars colony will destroy itself eventually. Akin returns to tell the resisters and begin gathering them up to have their fertility restored before transport to their new world.

=== Imago (1989) ===
The final book of the trilogy, Imago, is the shortest and the only one written from the first-person perspective. Imago shows the reader what has been hinted at for the last two books: the full potential of the new human-Oankali hybrid species. The story is in the first person from the perspective of Jodahs, the first ooloi construct, and a child of Lilith. Through its unique heritage, it has unlocked latent genetic potential of humans and Oankali. Part of the story is about Jodahs and another child of Lilith, Aaor. Both children are uncomfortable metamorphosing into the ooloi third sex, as both had previously thought themselves male and female, respectively. Through the novel, Jodahs comes to term with its own sex and helps Aaor with its metamorphosis.

Akin's proposal for a Mars colony in the previous book has been realized, providing an opportunity for humans who wish to live independently from the Oankali. Many humans have already migrated there, though the most hateful and barbaric of them still resist so that the Oankali render them unconscious and store them on the ship for genetic material. In an effort to contact human resisters for the Mars colony, Jodahs encounters a previously unknown group of humans: in a mountain village where sterile humans gathered but found one girl who turned out to be fertile, surviving from generation to generation through incest that resulted in compounding genetic damage—neurofibromatosis. The novel focuses on Jodahs's mission to heal them, make peace with them, and integrate them into the Oankali way with the other humans. When, for instance, Jodahs and Aaor are captured, they heal the guards of their disease and deformities, demonstrating their goodwill and softening resistance to them. The novel ends with the humans more willingly acquiescing to the Oankali.

== Background ==
In her 2000 interview with Charles Brown, Butler identified the Cold War under the Reagan Administration as a main motivator for the trilogy: "I was pretty despairing when I began the Xenogenesis books. This was back during the first Reagan administration, when the guy was talking about ‘winnable’ nuclear wars, ‘limited’ nuclear wars and all that. It scared me that we were electing someone who was talking that way. What if he meant it?"

Butler later expanded her explanation in an interview with Joshunda Sanders:

“I thought there must be something basic, something really genetically wrong with us if we're falling for this stuff [Reagan’s rhetoric]. And I came up with these characteristics. The aliens arrive after the war and they tell us that we have these two characteristics that don't work and play well together. They are intelligent, and they tell us we're the most intelligent species they've come across. But we're also hierarchical. And I put this after the big war because it's kind of an example. We've one-upped ourselves to death, just our tendency to one-up each other as individuals and groups, large and small.”

== Themes ==
What I intended to do when I began the novels...was change [human] males enough so that the hierarchical behavior would no longer be a big problem.

— Octavia E. Butler, in "'Radio Imagination': Octavia Butler on the Poetics of Narrative Embodiment."

Throughout the Xenogenesis trilogy themes of sexuality, gender, race, and species are explored. The Oankali believe that the human species has an inevitably self-destructive "Contradiction" between their high intelligence and their hierarchical nature. According to the Oankali, this is what caused the war that almost ended the human race, and this is why they cannot leave humans alone. Lilith and the Oankali-human hybrids are constantly battling with this inner conflict. According to Tor.com's Erika Nelson, the trilogy parallels the story of African slaves in America and the conflict that later generations of African Americans feel regarding their integration into American society. The human-Oankali hybrids feel that they have somehow betrayed their human side by integrating into Oankali society, but at the same time, because of the vast power imbalance, they never really had another viable option. In addition to allegorizing slavery, the trilogy more generally is written "in the context of colonization," as Nelson puts it, raising broad questions of coercion and agency. The relationship between the Oankali and the humans speaks to a range of imperialist relationships, from slavery to internment camps to eugenics. The series also draws upon elements of the myth of Lilith, the first wife of Adam.

The series also heavily explores themes of consent and coercion.

In addition to the social themes, the possible results of developing genetic science and biologically based technology are shown by the Oankali's genetic mastery. Joan Slonczewski, a biologist, published a review of the series in which she discusses the biological implications of the ooloi and how they can, through genetic engineering, achieve positive effects from "bad" genes such as a predisposition for cancer. Biological determinism is another ongoing thematic concern in the trilogy that links Butler's use of social and scientific themes; because the Oankali believe above all in a species' innate biological tendencies, characters must constantly negotiate between their supposed biological capacities and the limits of their individual will.

== Reception ==
Orson Scott Card commends the Xenogenesis trilogy as "more satisfying as hard science fiction" than Butler's earlier Patternist novels, specifically in that they show "how much power her storytelling has gained" in the intervening years.

In terms of each novel, Adele Newson praises the prose of Dawn, as "engaging" and having "a single-minded intensity." She highlights the relationship among the novel's main characters, Lilith and Joseph, as being unusual for science fiction to the point of being "refreshing" and "sensuous." Calling Lilith "the epitome of heroic womanism," Newson argues that "Lilith's life, like that of the black woman's, is a metaphor for the quest which would resolve the problem of her being both revered and despised by those with whom she inhabits society. In contrast, Newson finds the story's development in Adulthood Rites "disappointing": Lilith, she points out, "does little more than sulk silently away" and the story relies so much on "laborious" dialogue that it becomes "more or less a treatise in on the contradictory and often violent nature of humankind."

Similarly, Ted White from The Washington Post finds Imago verbose and "wandering" and concludes that, as an end to the trilogy, it is "anticlimactic."

Each of the three novels originally was nominated for the Locus Award for Best Science Fiction Novel in the year it was published (1987, 1988, and 1989), though none of the books won the award.

== Adaptations ==
In September 2015, it was announced that producer Allen Bain had optioned the rights to make Dawn for television. On February 26, 2020, Amazon Studios acquired the streaming rights with Victoria Mahoney writing and directing the pilot episode based on Dawn, and will produce the series with Bain, Pearl, and Carter's Bainframe, Ava DuVernay's Array Filmworks and Charles D. King's MACRO.
