= Octavia E. Butler =

American science fiction writer (1947–2006)

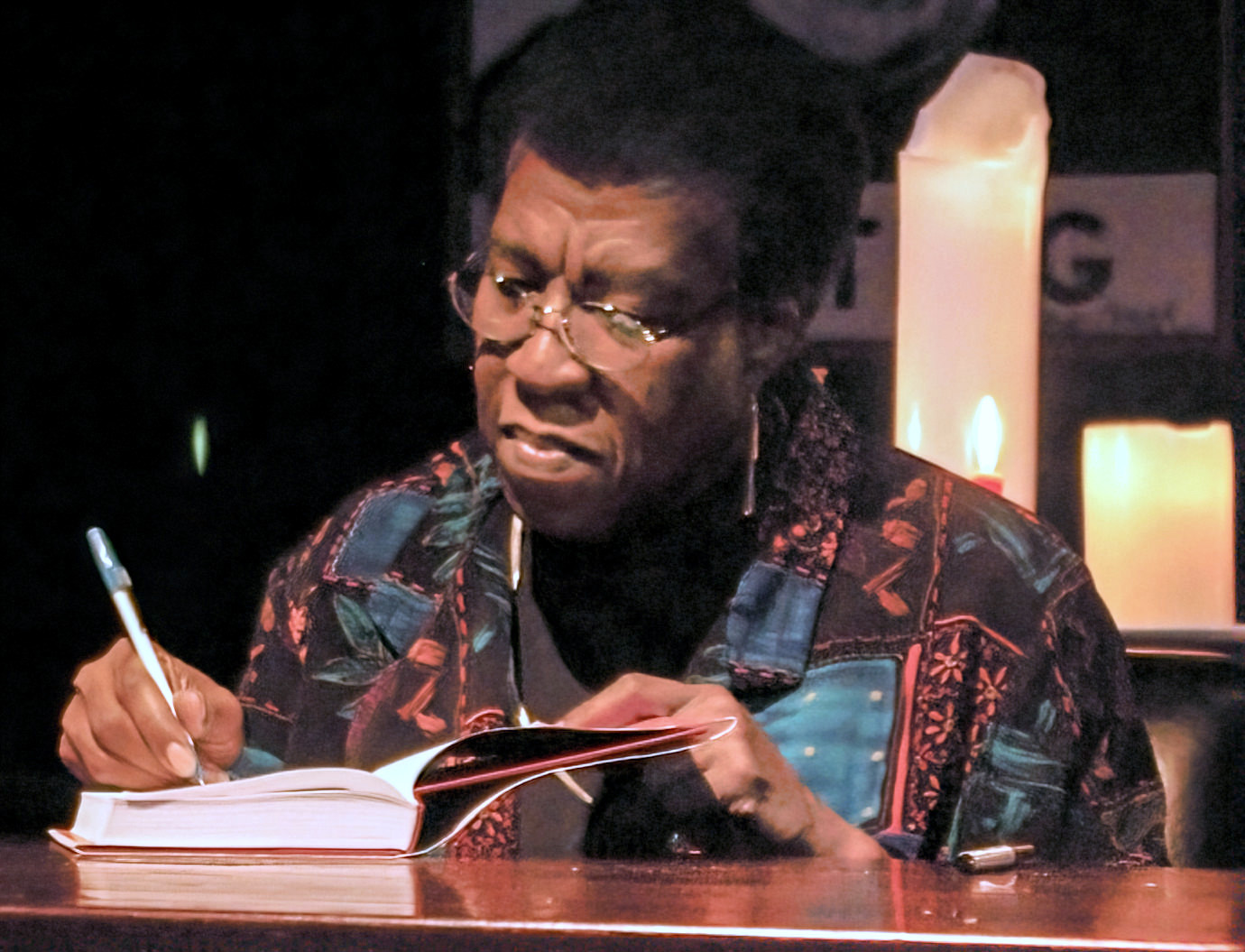
- Butler signing a copy of Fledgling in 2005
- Born: Octavia Estelle Butler; June 22, 1947; Pasadena, California, U.S.
- Died: February 24, 2006 (aged 58); Lake Forest Park, Washington, U.S.
- Education: Pasadena City College (AA); California State University, Los Angeles; UCLA Extension
- Occupation: Writer
- Writing career
- Period: 1970–2006
- Genre: Science fiction
- Notable awards: MacArthur Fellow; Hugo Award; Nebula Award; See list
- Website: Official website

Octavia Estelle Butler (June 22, 1947 – February 24, 2006) was an American science fiction and speculative fiction author who won Hugo, Locus, and Nebula awards. In 1995, Butler became the first science-fiction writer to receive a MacArthur Fellowship.

Born in Pasadena, California, Butler was raised by her widowed mother. She was extremely shy as a child, but Butler found an outlet at the library reading fantasy, and in writing. She began writing science fiction as a teenager. Butler attended community college during the Black Power movement in the 1960s. While participating in a local writer's workshop, she was encouraged to attend the Clarion Workshop which focused on science fiction.

Butler sold her first stories soon after, and by the late 1970s had become sufficiently successful as an author to be able to write full-time. Her works are widely read, with several series remaining popular well after her death including Parable of the Sower, the Patternist series, and the Xenogenesis trilogy -- all of which deal with themes that critique authority and social order, and follow main characters surviving despite being challenged by societal norms.

Butler's books and short stories drew the favorable attention of critics and the public, and awards soon followed. She also taught writer's workshops, and spoke about her experiences as an African American, using such themes in science fiction. Subsequent science fiction authors working in subgenres like Afrofuturism, often credit Butler as important influences. She eventually relocated to Washington. Butler died of a stroke at the age of 58. Her papers are held in the research collection of the Huntington Library in San Marino, California.

== Early life ==
Octavia Estelle Butler was born on June 22, 1947, in Pasadena, California, a city northeast of downtown Los Angeles. She was the only child of Octavia Margaret Guy, a housemaid, and Laurice James Butler, a shoeshiner. Butler's father died when she was three years old. She was raised by her mother and maternal grandmother in what she would later recall as a strict Baptist environment.

Growing up in Pasadena, Butler experienced limited cultural and ethnic diversity in the midst of de facto racial segregation in the surrounding area. She accompanied her mother to her cleaning work where, as workers, the two entered white people's houses through back doors. Her mother was treated poorly by her employers.

I began writing about power because I had so little.

— Octavia E. Butler, in Carolyn S. Davidson's
"The Science Fiction of Octavia Butler"

From an early age, an almost paralyzing shyness made it difficult for Butler to socialize with other children. Her awkwardness, paired with a slight dyslexia that made schoolwork a torment, made Butler an easy target for bullies. She believed that she was "ugly and stupid, clumsy, and socially hopeless." As a result, she frequently spent her time reading at the Pasadena Central Library. She also wrote extensively in her "big pink notebook".

Hooked at first on fairy tales and horse stories, Butler quickly became interested in science fiction magazines, such as Amazing Stories, Galaxy Science Fiction, and The Magazine of Fantasy & Science Fiction. She began reading stories by John Brunner, Zenna Henderson, and Theodore Sturgeon.

Why aren't there more SF [science fiction] Black writers? There aren't because there aren't. What we don't see, we assume can't be. What a destructive assumption.

— Octavia E. Butler, in "Octavia E. Butler: Telling My Stories"

At the age of 10, Butler begged her mother to buy her a Remington typewriter, on which she "pecked [her] stories two fingered." At 12, she watched the film Devil Girl from Mars (1954) and concluded that she could write a better story. She drafted what would later become the basis for her Patternist novels. Until then unaware of the obstacles that a black female writer could encounter, she became unsure of herself for the first time at the age of 13, when her well-intentioned Aunt Hazel said: "Honey ... Negroes can't be writers." But Butler persevered in her desire to publish a story, and even asked her junior high school science teacher, William Pfaff, to type the first manuscript she submitted to a science fiction magazine.

After graduating from John Muir High School in 1965, Butler worked during the day and attended Pasadena City College (PCC) at night. As a freshman at PCC, she won a college-wide short-story contest, earning her first income ($15) as a writer. She also got the "germ of the idea" for what would become her novel Kindred. An African-American classmate involved in the Black Power movement loudly criticized previous generations of African Americans for being subservient to whites. As Butler explained in later interviews, the young man's remarks were a catalyst that led her to respond with a story providing historical context for the subservience, showing that it could be understood as silent but courageous survival. In 1968, Butler graduated from PCC with an associate of arts degree with a focus in history.

== Rise to success ==
Who am I? I am a forty-seven-year-old writer who can remember being a ten-year-old writer and who expects someday to be an eighty-year-old writer. I am also comfortably asocial—a hermit. ... A pessimist if I'm not careful, a feminist, a Black, a former Baptist, an oil-and-water combination of ambition, laziness, insecurity, certainty, and drive.

— Octavia E. Butler, reading her description of herself included in Parable of the Sower, during a 1994 interview with Jelani Cobb

Although Butler's mother wanted her to become a secretary in order to have a steady income, Butler continued to work at a series of temporary jobs. She preferred less demanding work that would allow her to get up at two or three in the morning to write. Success continued to elude her. She styled her stories after the white-and-male-dominated science fiction she had grown up reading. She enrolled at California State University, Los Angeles, but switched to taking writing courses through UCLA Extension.

During the Open Door Workshop of the Writers Guild of America West, a program designed to mentor minority writers, her writing impressed one of the teachers, noted science-fiction writer Harlan Ellison. He encouraged her to attend the six-week Clarion Science Fiction Writers Workshop in Clarion, Pennsylvania. There, Butler met the Black science fiction writer Samuel R. Delany, who became a longtime friend. She also sold her first stories: "Childfinder" to Ellison, for his unpublished anthology The Last Dangerous Visions (eventually published in Unexpected Stories in 2014); and "Crossover" to Robin Scott Wilson, the director of the Clarion workshop, who published it in the 1971 Clarion anthology.

For the next five years, Butler worked on the novels that became known as the Patternist series: Patternmaster (1976), Mind of My Mind (1977), and Survivor (1978). In 1978, she was able to stop working at temporary jobs and live on her income from writing. She took a break from the Patternist series to research and write a stand-alone novel, Kindred (1979). She finished the Patternist series with Wild Seed (1980) and Clay's Ark (1984).

Butler's rise to prominence began in 1984 when "Speech Sounds" won the Hugo Award for Short Story and, a year later, "Bloodchild" won the Hugo Award, the Locus Award, and the Science Fiction Chronicle Reader Award for Best Novelette. In the meantime, Butler traveled to the Amazon rainforest and the Andes to do research for what would become the Xenogenesis trilogy: Dawn (1987), Adulthood Rites (1988), and Imago (1989). These stories were republished in 2000 as the collection Lilith's Brood.

During the 1990s, Butler completed the novels that strengthened her fame as a writer: Parable of the Sower (1993) and Parable of the Talents (1998). In addition, in 1995, she became the first science-fiction writer to be awarded a John D. and Catherine T. MacArthur Foundation fellowship, an award that came with a prize of $295,000.

In 1999, after her mother's death, Butler moved to Lake Forest Park, Washington.The Parable of the Talents had won the Science Fiction Writers of America's Nebula Award for Best Novel, and she had plans for four more Parable novels: Parable of the Trickster, Parable of the Teacher, Parable of Chaos, and Parable of Clay. However, after several failed attempts to begin The Parable of the Trickster, she decided to stop work in the series.

In later interviews, Butler explained that the research and writing of the Parable novels had overwhelmed and depressed her, so she had shifted to composing something "lightweight" and "fun" instead. This became her last book, the science-fiction vampire novel Fledgling (2005).

== Writing career ==
=== Early stories, Patternist series, and Kindred: 1971–1984 ===
Butler's first work published was "Crossover" in the 1971 Clarion Workshop anthology. She also sold the short story "Childfinder" to Harlan Ellison for the anthology The Last Dangerous Visions. "I thought I was on my way as a writer", Butler recalled in her short-fiction collection Bloodchild and Other Stories, which contains "Crossover." "In fact, I had five more years of rejection slips and horrible little jobs ahead of me before I sold another word."

Starting in 1974, Butler worked on a series of novels that would later be collected as the Patternist series, which depicts the transformation of humanity into three genetic groups: the dominant Patternists, humans who have been bred with heightened telepathic powers and are bound to the Patternmaster via a psionic chain; their enemies the Clayarks, disease-mutated animal-like superhumans; and the Mutes, ordinary humans bonded to the Patternists.

The first novel, Patternmaster (1976), eventually became the last installment in the series' internal chronology. Set in the distant future, it tells of the coming-of-age of Teray, a young Patternist who fights for position within Patternist society and eventually for the role of Patternmaster.

Next came Mind of My Mind (1977), a prequel to Patternmaster set in the 20th century. The story follows the development of Mary, the creator of the psionic chain and the first Patternmaster to bind all Patternists, and her inevitable struggle for power with her father Doro, a parapsychological vampire who seeks to retain control over the psionic children he has bred over the centuries.

To survive,
Know the past.
Let it touch you.
Then let
The past
Go.

— From "Earthseed: The Books of the Living," Parable of the Talents.

The third book of the series, Survivor, was published in 1978. The titular survivor is Alanna, the adopted child of the Missionaries, fundamentalist Christians who have traveled to another planet to escape Patternist control and Clayark infection. Captured by a local tribe called the Tehkohn, Alanna learns their language and adopts their customs, knowledge which she then uses to help the Missionaries avoid bondage and assimilation into a rival tribe that opposes the Tehkohn. Butler would later call Survivor the least favorite of her books, and withdraw it from reprinting.

After Survivor, Butler took a break from the Patternist series to write what would become her best-selling novel, Kindred (1979), as well as the short story "Near of Kin" (1979). In Kindred, Dana, an African-American woman, is repeatedly transported in time between 1976 Los Angeles and an early 19th-century plantation on the Eastern Shore of Maryland. There she meets ancestors: Alice, a free black woman forced into slavery later in life, and Rufus, the white son of a planter who also becomes a slaveholder. In "Near of Kin", the protagonist discovers a taboo relationship in her family as she goes through her mother's things after her death.

In 1980, Butler published the fourth book of the Patternist series, Wild Seed, whose narrative became the series' origin story. Set in Africa and America during the 17th century, Wild Seed traces the struggle between the four-thousand-year-old parapsychological vampire Doro and his "wild" child and bride, the three-hundred-year-old shapeshifter and healer Anyanwu. Doro, who has bred psionic children for centuries, deceives Anyanwu into becoming one of his breeders, but she eventually escapes and uses her gifts to create communities that rival Doro's. When Doro finally tracks her down, Anyanwu, tired by decades of escaping or fighting Doro, decides to commit suicide, forcing him to admit his need for her.

In 1983, Butler published "Speech Sounds", a story set in a post-apocalyptic Los Angeles where a pandemic has caused most humans to lose their ability to read, speak, or write. For many, this impairment is accompanied by uncontrollable feelings of jealousy, resentment, and rage. "Speech Sounds" received the 1984 Hugo Award for Best Short Story.

In 1984, Butler released the last book of the Patternmaster series, Clay's Ark. Set in the Mojave Desert, it focuses on a colony of humans infected by an extraterrestrial microorganism brought to Earth by the one surviving astronaut of the spaceship Clay's Ark. As the microorganism compels its hosts to spread it, the infected humans kidnap others to infect them and, in the case of women, give birth to the mutant, sphinx-like children who will be the first members of the Clayark race.

=== Bloodchild and the Xenogenesis trilogy: 1984–1989 ===
Butler followed Clay's Ark with the critically acclaimed short story "Bloodchild" (1984). Set on an alien planet, it depicts the complex relationship between human refugees and the insect-like aliens who keep them in a preserve to protect them, but also to use them as hosts for breeding their young. Sometimes called Butler's "pregnant man story," "Bloodchild" won the Nebula, Hugo, and Locus Awards, and the Science Fiction Chronicle Reader Award.

Three years later, Butler published Dawn, the first installment of what would become known as the Xenogenesis trilogy. The series examines the theme of alienation by creating situations in which humans are forced to coexist with other species to survive and extends Butler's recurring exploration of genetically altered, hybrid individuals and communities. In Dawn, protagonist Lilith Iyapo finds herself in a spaceship after surviving a nuclear apocalypse that destroys Earth. Saved by the Oankali aliens, the human survivors must combine their DNA with an ooloi, the Oankali's third sex, in order to create a new race that eliminates a self-destructive flaw in humans: their aggressive hierarchical tendencies. Butler followed Dawn with "The Evening and the Morning and the Night" (1987), a story about how certain females with "Duryea-Gode Disease", a genetic disorder which causes dissociative states, obsessive self-mutilation, and violent psychosis, are able to control others with the disease.

Adulthood Rites (1988) and Imago (1989), the second and the third books in the Xenogenesis trilogy, focus on the predatory and prideful tendencies that affect human evolution, as humans now revolt against Lilith's Oankali-engineered progeny. Set thirty years after humanity's return to Earth, Adulthood Rites centers on the kidnapping of Lilith's part-human, part alien child, Akin, by a human-only group who are against the Oankali. Akin learns about both aspects of his identity through his life with the humans as well as the Akjai. The Oankali-only group becomes their mediator, and ultimately creates a human-only colony on Mars. In Imago, the Oankali create a third species more powerful than themselves: the shape-shifting healer Jodahs, a human-Oankali ooloi who must find suitable human male and female mates to survive its metamorphosis and who finds them in the most unexpected of places, in a village of renegade humans.

=== The Parable series: 1993–1998 ===
In the mid-1990s, Butler published two novels later designated as the Parable (or Earthseed) series. The books depict the struggle of the Earthseed community to survive the socioeconomic and political collapse of 21st-century America due to poor environmental stewardship, corporate greed, and the growing gap between the wealthy and the poor. The books propose alternate philosophical views and religious interventions as solutions to such dilemmas.

The first book in the series, Parable of the Sower (1993), introduces the fifteen-year-old protagonist, Lauren Oya Olamina, and is set in a dystopian California in the 2020s. Lauren, who lives with a syndrome causing her to literally feel any physical pain she witnesses, struggles with the religious beliefs and physical isolation of her hometown Robledo. She forms a new belief system, Earthseed, which posits a future for the human race on other planets. When Robledo is destroyed and Lauren's family and neighbors killed, she and two other survivors flee north. Recruiting members of varying social backgrounds along the way, Lauren relocates her new group to Northern California, naming her new community Acorn.

Butler's 1998 follow-up novel, Parable of the Talents, is set some time after Lauren's death and is told through the excerpts of Lauren's journals, as framed by the commentary of her estranged daughter, Larkin. It details the invasion of Acorn by right-wing fundamentalist Christians, Lauren's attempts to survive their religious "re-education," and the final triumph of Earthseed as a community and a doctrine.

Between her Earthseed novels, Butler published the collection Bloodchild and Other Stories (1995), which includes the short stories "Bloodchild," "The Evening and the Morning and the Night," "Near of Kin," "Speech Sounds," and "Crossover," as well as the non-fiction pieces "Positive Obsession" and "Furor Scribendi".

=== Late stories and Fledgling: 2003–2005 ===
After several years of writer's block, Butler published the short stories "Amnesty" (2003) and "The Book of Martha" (2003), and her second standalone novel, Fledgling (2005). Both short stories focus on how impossible conditions force an ordinary woman to make a distressing choice. In "Amnesty", an alien abductee recounts her painful abuse at the hand of the unwitting aliens and upon her release, by humans, and explains why she chose to work as a translator for the aliens now that the Earth's economy is in a deep depression. In "The Book of Martha", God asks a middle-aged African-American novelist to make one important change to fix humanity's destructive ways. Martha's choice—to make humans have vivid and satisfying dreams—means that she will no longer be able to do what she loves in writing fiction. These two stories were added to the 2005 edition of Bloodchild and Other Stories.

Butler's last publication during her lifetime was Fledgling, a novel exploring the culture of a vampire community living in symbiosis with humans. Set on the West Coast, it tells of the coming-of-age of a young female hybrid vampire named Shori, whose species is called Ina. The only survivor of a vicious attack on her families that left her an amnesiac, she must seek justice for her dead, build a new family, and relearn how to be an Ina. Scholars like Susana M. Morris read Fledgling as a powerful disruption of the vampire genre—a genre which tends to feature pale vampire heroes with paternalist tendencies that privilege whiteness. Butler disrupts this narrative by centering Shori, the protagonist of Fledgling, a petite Black female Ina.

== Later years and death ==
During her last years, Butler struggled with writer's block and depression, partly caused by the side effects of medication for high blood pressure. She continued writing and taught at Clarion's Science Fiction Writers' Workshop regularly. In 2005, she was inducted into Chicago State University's International Black Writers Hall of Fame.

Butler died outside of her home in Lake Forest Park, Washington, on February 24, 2006, aged 58. Contemporary news accounts were inconsistent as to the cause of her death, with some reporting that she had a fatal stroke and others indicating that she died of head injuries after falling and striking her head on her cobbled walkway. Another interpretation, backed by Locus magazine, is that a stroke caused the fall and the subsequent head injuries.

Butler maintained a longstanding relationship with the Huntington Library and bequeathed her papers, including manuscripts, correspondence, school papers, notebooks, and photographs, to the library in her will. The collection, comprising 9,062 pieces in 386 boxes, 1 volume, 2 binders and 18 broadsides, was made available to scholars and researchers in 2010. Butler donated one of her typewriters, an Olivetti Studio 46, to Smithsonian Institution's Anacostia Community Museum for a 2003–2004 exhibition celebrating Black American literature.

== Themes and style ==
=== Critique of present-day hierarchies ===
In multiple interviews and essays, Butler explained her view of humanity: inherently flawed by an innate tendency towards hierarchical thinking which leads to tribalism, caste, intolerance, violence and, if not checked, the ultimate destruction of our species.

"Simple peck-order bullying", she wrote in her essay "A World without Racism", "is only the beginning of the kind of hierarchical behavior that can lead to racism, sexism, ethnocentrism, classism, and all the other 'isms' that cause so much suffering in the world." Her stories, then, often replay humanity's domination of the weak by the strong as a type of parasitism. These "others", whether aliens, vampires, superhuman, or slave masters, find themselves defied by a protagonist who embodies difference, diversity, and change, so that, as John R. Pfeiffer notes, "In one sense [Butler's] fables are trials of solutions to the self-destructive condition in which she finds mankind."

Embrace diversity
Unite—
or be divided,
robbed,
ruled,
killed
By those who see you as prey.
Embrace diversity
Or be destroyed.

— From "Earthseed: The Books of the Living," Parable of the Sower.

=== Remaking of the human ===
In his essay on the sociobiological backgrounds of Butler's Xenogenesis trilogy, J. Adam Johns describes how Butler's narratives counteract the death drive behind the hierarchical impulse with an innate love of life (biophilia), particularly of different, strange life. Specifically, Butler's stories feature gene manipulation, interbreeding, interracial marriage and miscegenation, symbiosis, mutation, alien contact, intersectionality, contamination, and other forms of hybridity as the means to correct the sociobiological causes of hierarchical violence. As De Witt Douglas Kilgore and Ranu Samantrai note, "in [Butler's] narratives the undoing of the human body is both literal and metaphorical, for it signifies the profound changes necessary to shape a world not organized by hierarchical violence." The evolutionary maturity achieved by the bioengineered hybrid protagonist at the end of the story, then, signals the possible evolution of the dominant community in terms of tolerance, acceptance of diversity, and a desire to wield power responsibly.

=== Survivor as hero ===
Butler's protagonists are disenfranchised individuals who endure, compromise, and embrace radical change in order to survive. As De Witt Douglas Kilgore and Ranu Samantrai note, her stories focus on minority characters whose historical background makes them already intimate with brutal violation and exploitation, and therefore the need to compromise to survive. Even when endowed with extra, paranormal abilities, these characters are forced to experience unprecedented physical, mental, and emotional distress and exclusion to ensure a minimal degree of agency and to prevent humanity from achieving self-destruction. In many of her stories, their acts of courage become acts of understanding, and in some cases, love, as they reach a crucial compromise with those in power. Ultimately, Butler's focus on disenfranchised characters serves to illustrate both the historical exploitation of minorities and how the resolve of one such exploited individual may bring on critical change.

=== Creation of alternative communities ===
Butler's stories feature mixed communities founded by African protagonists and populated by diverse, if similar-minded individuals. Members may be humans of African, European, or Asian descent, extraterrestrial (such as the N'Tlic in Bloodchild), from a different species (such as the vampiric Ina in Fledgling), and cross-species (such as the human-Oankali Akin and Jodahs in the Xenogenesis trilogy). In some stories, the community's hybridity results in a flexible view of sexuality and gender (for instance, the polyamorous extended families in Fledgling). Thus, Butler creates bonds between groups that are generally considered to be separate and unrelated, and suggests hybridity as "the potential root of good family and blessed community life".

Kindred (1979) is one of the only works of 20th-century American literature to feature a married interracial couple. As Farah Peterson comments, in an American society gripped by racism, it took "a fantasy novelist... to imagine how one of these marriages would work in practice" and write the possibility of such a relationship into literary history.

=== Relationship to Afrofuturism ===
Charlie Rose: "What then is central to what you want to say about race?"

Butler: "Do I want to say something central about race? Aside from, 'Hey we're here!'?"

— From Butler's interview on Charlie Rose. Thursday, June 1, 2000.

Butler was known for blending science fiction with African American spiritualism.

Butler's work has been associated with the genre of Afrofuturism, a term coined by Mark Dery to describe "speculative fiction that treats African-American themes and addresses African-American concerns in the context of 20th-century technoculture". Some critics, however, have noted that while Butler's protagonists are of African descent, the communities they create are multi-ethnic and, sometimes, multi-species. As De Witt Douglas Kilgore and Ranu Samantrai explain in their 2010 memorial to Butler, while keeping "an afro-centric sensibility at the core of narratives", her "insistence on hybridity beyond the point of discomfort" and grim themes deny both the ethnocentric escapism of afrofuturism and the sanitized perspective of white-dominated liberal pluralism.

Wild Seed, of the Patternist series, is considered to particularly fit ideas of Afrofuturist thematic concerns, as the narrative of two immortal Africans Doro and Anyanwu features science fiction technologies and an alternate anti-colonialist history of seventeenth-century America.

=== Point of view ===
Butler began reading science fiction at a young age, but quickly became disenchanted by the genre's unimaginative portrayal of ethnicity and class as well as by its lack of noteworthy female protagonists. She determined to correct those gaps by, as De Witt Douglas Kilgore and Ranu Samantrai point out, "choosing to write self-consciously as an African-American woman marked by a particular history"—what Butler herself referred to as "writing myself in." Butler's stories, therefore, are usually written from the perspective of a marginalized black woman whose difference from the dominant agents increases her potential for reconfiguring the future of her society.

=== Audience ===
Publishers and critics have labelled Butler's work as science fiction. While Butler enjoyed the genre deeply, calling it "potentially the freest genre in existence," she resisted being branded a genre writer. Her narratives have drawn attention of people from varied ethnic and cultural backgrounds. She claimed to have three loyal audiences: black readers, science-fiction fans, and feminists.

== Critical reception ==
The New York Times regarded her novels as "evocative" and "often troubling" explorations of "far-reaching issues of race, sex, power". Writing in The Magazine of Fantasy & Science Fiction, Orson Scott Card called her examination of humanity "clear-headed and brutally unsentimental", and The Village Voice's Dorothy Allison described her as "writing the most detailed social criticism" where "the hard edge of cruelty, violence, and domination is described in stark detail". Locus regarded her as "one of those authors who pay serious attention to the way human beings actually work together and against each other, and she does so with extraordinary plausibility." The Houston Post ranked her "among the best SF writers, blessed with a mind capable of conceiving complicated futuristic situations that shed considerable light on our current affairs."

Some scholars have focused on Butler's choice to write from the point of view of marginal characters and communities and thus "expanded SF to reflect the experiences and expertise of the disenfranchised". While surveying Butler's novels, critic Burton Raffel noted how race and gender influence her writing: "I do not think any of these eight books could have been written by a man, as they most emphatically were not, nor, with the single exception of her first book, Pattern-Master (1976), are likely to have been written, as they most emphatically were, by anyone but an African American." Robert Crossley commended how Butler's "feminist aesthetic" works to expose sexual, racial, and cultural chauvinism because it is "enriched by a historical consciousness that shapes the depiction of enslavement both in the real past and in imaginary pasts and futures."

Butler's prose has been praised by critics including the Washington Post Book World, where her craftsmanship has been described as "superb", and by Burton Raffel, who regards Butler's prose as "carefully, expertly crafted" and "crystalline, at its best, sensuous, sensitive, exact, not in the least directed at calling attention to itself".

== Influence ==
In interviews with Charles Rowell and Randall Kenan, Butler credited the struggles of her working-class mother as an important influence on her writing. Because Butler's mother received little formal education herself, she made sure that young Butler was given the opportunity to learn by bringing her reading materials that her white employers threw away, from magazines to advanced books. She also encouraged Butler to write. She bought her daughter her first typewriter when she was 10 years old, and, seeing her hard at work on a story casually remarked that maybe one day she could become a writer, causing Butler to realize that it was possible to make a living as an author. A decade later, Mrs. Butler would pay more than a month's rent to have an agent review her daughter's work. She also provided Butler with the money she had been saving for dental work to pay for Butler's scholarship so she could attend the Clarion Science Fiction Writers Workshop, where Butler sold her first two stories.

A second person to play an influential role in Butler's work was the American writer Harlan Ellison. As a teacher at the Open Door Workshop of the Screen Writers Guild of America, he gave Butler her first honest and constructive criticism on her writing after years of lukewarm responses from composition teachers and baffling rejections from publishers. Impressed by her work, Ellison suggested she attend the Clarion Science Fiction Writers Workshop and even contributed $100 towards her application fee. As the years passed, Ellison's mentorship became a close friendship.

Butler herself has been highly influential in the legacy of science fiction, particularly for people of color. In 2015, writers adrienne maree brown and Walidah Imarisha co-edited Octavia's Brood: Science Fiction Stories from Social Justice Movements (AK Press), a collection of 20 short stories and essays about social justice, inspired by Butler. In 2020, brown and Toshi Reagon, creator of an opera adaptation of Parable of the Sower, began collaborating on a podcast called Octavia's Parables.

== Adaptations ==
Parable of the Sower was adapted as Parable of the Sower: The Opera, written by American folk/blues musician Toshi Reagon in collaboration with her mother, singer and composer Bernice Johnson Reagon. The adaptation's libretto and musical score combine African-American spirituals, soul, rock and roll, and folk music into rounds to be performed by singers sitting in a circle. It was first performed as part of The Public Theater's 2015 Under the Radar Festival in New York City.

Kindred was adapted as a graphic novel by author Damien Duffy and artist John Jennings. The adaptation was published by Abrams ComicsArts on January 10, 2017. To visually differentiate the time periods in which Butler set the story, Jennings used muted colors for the present and vibrant ones for the past to demonstrate how the remnants and relevance of slavery are still with us. The graphic novel adaptation debuted as number one New York Times hardcover graphic book bestseller on January 29, 2017. After the success of Kindred, Duffy and Jennings also adapted Parable of the Sower as a graphic novel. They also plan on releasing an adaptation of Parable of the Talents.

Dawn is currently being adapted for television by producers Ava DuVernay and Charles D. King's Macro Ventures, alongside writer Victoria Mahoney. There is no projected release date for the adaptation yet. A television series based on Wild Seed is also in the works for Amazon Prime Video with a screenplay co-written by Nnedi Okorafor and Wanuri Kahiu.

In 2021, FX ordered an eight-episode miniseries, Kindred, based on Butler's book of the same name. The show was developed by Branden Jacobs-Jenkins and premiered on December 13, 2022.

== Awards and honors ==
- 1980: Creative Arts Award, L.A. YWCA.
- 1984: Hugo Award for Best Short Story – "Speech Sounds"
- 1984: Nebula Award for Best Novelette – "Bloodchild"
- 1985: Locus Award for Best Novelette – "Bloodchild"
- 1985: Hugo Award for Best Novelette – "Bloodchild"
- 1985: Science Fiction Chronicle Award for Best Novelette – "Bloodchild"
- 1988: Science Fiction Chronicle Award for Best Novelette – "The Evening and the Morning and the Night"
- 1995: John D. and Catherine T. MacArthur Foundation "Genius" Grant
- 1995: Bloodchild, a New York Times Notable Book
- 1997: Honorary Degree in Humane Letters, from Kenyon College
- 1998: James Tiptree Jr. Award Honor List– Parable of the Talents
- 1999: Los Angeles Times Bestseller – Parable of the Talents
- 1999: Nebula Award for Best Novel – Parable of the Talents
- 2001: Arthur C. Clarke Award Shortlist – Parable of the Talents
- 2000: Lifetime Achievement Award in Writing from the PEN American Center
- 2005: Langston Hughes Medal of The City College
- 2010: Inducted by the Science Fiction Hall of Fame
- 2012: Solstice Award.
- 2018: The International Astronomical Union named a mountain on Charon (a moon of Pluto) Butler Mons to honor the author, after a public suggestion period and nomination by NASA.
- 2018: Google featured her in a Google Doodle in the United States on June 22, 2018, which would have been Butler's 71st birthday.
- 2019: Asteroid 7052 Octaviabutler, discovered by American astronomer Eleanor Helin at Palomar Observatory in 1988, was named in her memory. The official naming citation was published by the Minor Planet Center on August 27, 2019 (M.P.C. 115893).
- 2019: Los Angeles Public Library opened the Octavia Lab, a do-it-yourself maker space and audiovisual space named in Butler's honor.
- 2021: Inducted into the National Women's Hall of Fame.

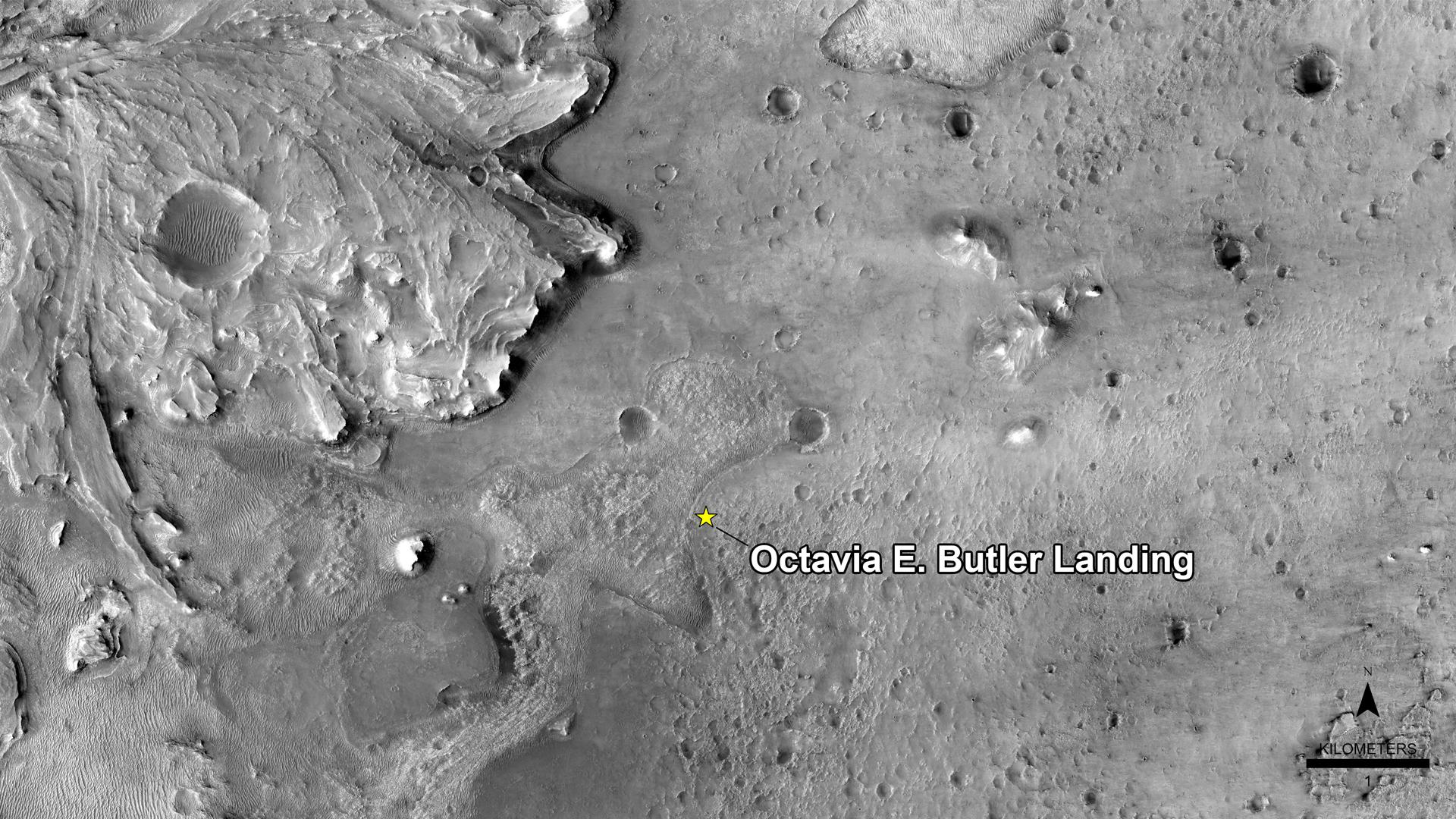
Mars Perseverance rover – Octavia E. Butler Landing in Jezero Crater

- 2021: NASA named the Mars landing site of the Perseverance rover the "Octavia E. Butler Landing" in her honor.
- 2022: Awarded the first-ever Infinity Award by the Science Fiction and Fantasy Writers Association, given to those who have died before they could be considered for a Grand Master award.
- 2022: The school Butler attended for middle school changed its name to Octavia E. Butler Magnet.
- 2023: In February 2023, a bookstore named Octavia's Bookshelf opened in Pasadena, California.

== Memorial scholarships ==
In 2006, the Carl Brandon Society established the Octavia E. Butler Memorial Scholarship in Butler's memory, to enable writers of color to attend the annual Clarion West Writers Workshop and Clarion Writers' Workshop, descendants of the original Clarion Science Fiction Writers' Workshop in Clarion, Pennsylvania, where Butler got her start. The first scholarships were awarded in 2007.

In March 2019, Butler's alma mater, Pasadena City College, announced the Octavia E. Butler Memorial Scholarship for students enrolled in the Pathways program and committed to transfer to four-year institutions.

The memorial scholarships sponsored by the Carl Brandon Society and Pasadena City College help fulfill three of the life goals Butler had handwritten in a notebook from 1988:

"I will send poor black youngsters to Clarion or other writer's workshops

"I will help poor black youngsters broaden their horizons

"I will help poor black youngsters go to college"

== Works ==
A complete bibliography of Butler's work was compiled in 2008 by Calvin Ritch.

=== Novels ===
==== Patternist series ====
1. Wild Seed (Doubleday, 1980)
2. Mind of My Mind (Doubleday, 1977)
3. Clay's Ark (St. Martin's Press, 1984)
4. Survivor (Doubleday, 1978)
5. Patternmaster (Doubleday, 1976)
- Omnibus edition (excluding Survivor and A Necessary Being): Seed to Harvest (Grand Central Publishing, 2007)

==== Xenogenesis, or Lilith's Brood series ====
1. Dawn (Warner, 1987)
2. Adulthood Rites (Warner, 1988)
3. Imago (Warner, 1989)
- Omnibus editions:
  - Xenogenesis (Guild America Books, 1989)
  - Lilith's Brood (Warner, 2000)

==== Parable, or Earthseed series ====
1. Parable of the Sower (Four Walls, Eight Windows, 1993) (Note: Parable of the Sower is a sci-fi novel about California burning in 2024. The Eaton Fire in January 2025 at Altadena is near Octavia Butler's hometown of Pasadena.)
2. Parable of the Talents (Seven Stories Press, 1998)

==== Stand-alones ====
- Kindred (Doubleday, 1979)
- Fledgling (Seven Stories Press, 2005)

=== Short stories ===
Collections:

- Bloodchild and Other Stories (Four Walls, Eight Windows, 1995; Seven Stories Press, 2005), collection of 4 short stories (1 added in 2005), 3 novelettes (1 added in 2005) and 2 essays:
  "Bloodchild" (novelette), "The Evening and the Morning and the Night" (novelette), "Near of Kin", "Speech Sounds", "Crossover", "Positive Obsession" (essay), "Furor Scribendi" (essay), "Amnesty" (novelette, added in 2005), "The Book of Martha" (added in 2005)
- Unexpected Stories (2014), collection of 1 short story and 1 novelette:
  "Childfinder", "A Necessary Being" (novelette)

=== Non-fiction ===
Essays and speeches

- "Lost Races of Science Fiction", Transmission (Summer 1980): pp. 16–18
- "Birth of a Writer", Essence 20 (May 1989): 74+. Reprinted as "Positive Obsession" in Bloodchild and Other Stories
- "Free Libraries: Are They Becoming Extinct?", Omni 15.10 (August 1993): 4
- "Journeys", Journeys 30 (Oct 1995). Part of an edition from PEN/Faulkner Foundation, a talk given by Butler at the PEN/Faulkner Awards for Fiction in Rockville, MD at Quill & Brush. Reprinted as "The Monophobic Response" (the title that Butler preferred), in Dark Matter: A Century of Speculative Fiction from the African Diaspora, ed. Sheree R Thomas (New York: Aspect/Warner Books, 2000), pp. 415–416.
- "Devil Girl from Mars: Why I Write Science Fiction", Media in Transition (MIT), February 19, 1998; Transcript October 4, 1998)
- "Brave New Worlds: A Few Rules for Predicting the Future", Essence 31.1 (May 2000): 164+
- "A World without Racism": "NPR Essay - UN Racism Conference", NPR Weekend Edition Saturday (September 1, 2001)
- "Octavia Butler's Aha! Moment", O, The Oprah Magazine 3.5 (May 2002): 79–80

=== Incomplete novels and projects ===
Several of Octavia's works were not completed:

- "I Should Have Said..." (memoir, 1998)
- "Paraclete" (novel, 2001)
- "Spiritus" (novel, 2001)
- "Parable of the Trickster" (novel, 1990s-2000s)

=== Unpublished/not-in-print stories and novels ===
- "To the Victor" (Story, 1965, under pen name Karen Adams, winning submission for a competition at Pasadena City College)
- "Loss" (Story, 1967, 5th place in national Writer's Digest short story contest)
- Blindsight (Novel: 1978, started; 1981, first draft; 1984, second draft)

== See also ==
- Afrofuturism
- Black science fiction
- Feminist science fiction
- Speculative fiction
- Women in speculative fiction
