= Patternmaster =

1976 novel by Octavia E. Butler

- First edition
- Author: Octavia Butler
- Cover artist: Steve Quay and Tim Quay
- Series: Patternist
- Publisher: Doubleday
- Publication date: July 1976
- Pages: 186
- ISBN: 0-385-12197-0
- Followed by: Mind of My Mind

Patternmaster (1976) is a science fiction novel by American author Octavia E. Butler. Patternmaster, the first book to be published but the last in the series' internal chronology, depicts a distant future where the human race has been sharply divided into the dominant Patternists, their enemies the "diseased" and animalistic Clayarks, and the enslaved human mutes. The Patternists, bred for intelligence and psychic abilities, are networked telepaths. They are ruled by the most powerful telepath, known as the Patternmaster. Patternmaster tells the coming-of-age story of Teray, a young Patternist who learns he is a son of the Patternmaster. Teray fights for position within Patternist society and eventually for the role of Patternmaster.

== Plot ==
The novel begins with the Patternmaster, Rayal, in bed with Jansee, his lead wife and sister. For a year, there have been no major attacks from the "Clayarks", mutated humans the Patternists have been in constant battle against. Rayal and Jansee have two sons: Teray, the youngest, who is away at Redhill School, and Coransee. Patternists can connect with their children telepathically, and Jansee is concerned about her sons. To check on them, she thinks of sending a 'mute', a human without paranormal powers. Rayal disagrees, leading the couple to argue. Aside from Jansee, Rayal killed all of his siblings to become Patternmaster and lead the telepathic race through the powerful connections between the Patternists, known as the Pattern. The peaceful year ends as the Clayarks attack the Patternists. They shoot and kill Jansee and greatly injure Rayal, who then has to use his powers to save his own life instead of killing the Clayarks.

Many years later, Teray leaves the Redhill School with his wife, Iray. As the couple is leaving, they encounter two Patternists: Joachim, a Housemaster to whom Teray is apprenticed, and Jer, an outsider. The two inform Teray of the recent Clayark raid and tell him of their plans to visit Coransee on their way to Joachim's House. Coransee challenges Teray and tries to read his thoughts. Although apprentices cannot legally be traded, Coransee negotiates with Joachim to trade the talented artist Laro for Teray—who is revealed to be Coransee's brother. At dinner, the couple learns that the deal has been successful and that Teray will be an outsider. Outsiders cannot be married or have children and do not control where they live. Joachim promises to try to fix the situation.

After Joachim leaves, Coransee shows up at Teray and Iray's door, telepathically fighting and nearly killing Teray. Coransee informs him that they are full brothers and asks Teray, being his only threat as Patternmaster, if he wants to control the Pattern. Teray only wants his freedom and his own House. Teray refuses Coransee's deal, because he wishes to implant controls on him, and is subsequently made an outsider in charge of the mutes. Iray is no longer Teray's wife and helps him by becoming part of Coransee's household. Teray meets a mute woman named Suliana, badly beaten by an outsider named Jason, and calls in the resident healer, Amber, to heal her injuries. Teray plans to run away by educating himself about relevant terrains. Teray encounters a Clayark, but allows him to live and leave. Joachim brings a journeyman named Michael and others to Coransee's House to investigate two charges against him in an attempt to help Teray escape. Coransee escapes the charges by turning things around on Joachim, who could be charged for illegally trading an apprentice. Teray and Amber make plans to escape to Forsyth, where Michael has offered him sanctuary.

Teray tells Iray of his plans, but she is now committed to Coransee and cannot leave. Teray and Amber leave, and she teaches him a quicker way to kill the Clayarks. Teray asks Amber to be his lead when he has his own House, but she declines, wanting to have her own House. Coransee and a party of ten find the pair. Coransee wants to take Teray to Forsyth to be judged by Rayal. On their travels, Teray and Amber discover that she is pregnant with his child, and Coransee tries to force them to break their link. Coransee and Teray telepathically fight again, and because Coransee lowers his defenses, Teray kills him. Teray links with the other Patternists while preparing to lead them to the Patternmaster's House. After they kill thousands of Clayarks, Teray finds Rayal in the Pattern. Rayal informs Teray that he has been waiting for him for years and has planned for Teray to succeed him, because of his healer skills.

== Themes ==
=== Class division and society ===
Butler creates a society in the Pattern where classes are distinctly ordered and defined. In the highest tier of society, are the Patternists headed by the Patternmaster, Rayal. Below the Patternmaster are Housemasters who control houses, or small communities. Within the houses, there are apprentices. Apprentices are Housemasters in training and have more freedom and power than lowlier people in the house. Outsiders are generally not allowed to become Housemasters and are usually relegated to servants and sometimes slaves. The Patternmaster's House includes journeymen who share equivalence with officials, but have limited power. Independents like the character Amber function outside the House and work in any House they choose.

Others like mutes have no power or status in society. They serve as workers and caregivers to Patternists. However, Patternists and mutes share a commonality: they fear Clayarks, who are horribly mutated humans who have human heads, but catlike animal bodies. Clayark society's sole focus is ensuring that their community has enough food and supporting the increasing numbers in their community. This is the only point of interest that Patternists and mutes share in trying to cripple their enemies.

=== Power and responsibility ===
In the Pattern community, Patternists have more power than the mutes. There is also a hierarchy within the Patternist community. The Patternmaster, Rayal, holds the most power as he controls the Pattern. He allows his sons to quarrel in a power struggle, hoping that his son Teray will emerge victorious. Coransee uses his strengths to become Housemaster and self-proclaims himself as rightful heir. Coransee likes power, but does not want the responsibility. As a contrast, Butler presents Amber who seeks a balance between the two. In her profession as a healer, she sees qualities in power and responsibility. Teray becomes a muteherd (the role of directing the mutes of a House) and he understands that although his power in the household is small, he takes his responsibility seriously. Teray's strength along with his greater sense of responsibility than his brother, makes him the likelier and worthier candidate to become the Patternmaster, which he eventually accomplishes.

=== Communication and community versus the individual ===
The reason that Patternists have control over mutes is their ability to mentally communicate with other Patternists. A Patternist's position in society is often linked to how strong they are able to telepathically connect with other characters. Characters like Amber and Teray have better communication skills because of their empathy and ability to heal. Butler also makes the distinction of the strength of the community over the individual in the contrast of the characters Joachim and Coransee. Coransee does not seek mental connections with others in the community unless seeking an opportunity to control others; however, Joachim values other Patternists in the community. Coransee's choice of individualism makes him quite a powerful character, but his choice to not seek connections with the community ultimately costs him the role as the Patternmaster. The role of Patternmaster is ultimately given to Teray because he accepts and understands the value of community and is able to triumph as Patternmaster.

== Reception ==
Patternmaster was generally well received by critics. Publishers Weekly noted, "The author carefully spells out the ground of her unique world, and the ensuing story of live, chase and combat is consistently attention-holding." A contributor to Kirkus Reviews called the novel, "fine, old-fashioned [science fiction]," and that it represents "escape fiction in the best Patterned tradition."

Some say the Patternmaster as one of the weaker novels in the series because of Butler's inexperience. T.G. Wagner from SF Reviews.net says that "Butler has yet to get a handle on how best to deliver the subtextual social commentary that would give the series its depth." In 1992, Orson Scott Card rejects Patternmaster as ‘‘more magic romance than hard science fiction," but also praises her work for making the characters realistic and "touching on issues of freedom and slavery, power and responsibility that have made all her writings such vibrant studies of the ethics of power and submission."
