= Bloodchild and Other Stories =

Short story collection by Octavia E. Butler

- First edition
- Author: Octavia E. Butler
- Genre: Science fiction, horror
- Publisher: Four Walls Eight Windows, Seven Stories Press
- Publication date: Aug/Sep 1995
- Media type: Print (hardcover, trade paperback)
- Pages: 144
- ISBN: 1-56858-055-X (1st ed.)

Bloodchild and Other Stories is the only collection of science fiction stories and essays written by American writer Octavia E. Butler. Each story and essay features an afterword by Butler. "Bloodchild", the title story, won the Hugo Award and Nebula Award. It was first published in 1995. The 2005 expanded edition contains the additional stories "Amnesty" and "The Book of Martha".

== Stories ==
=== "Bloodchild" ===
"Bloodchild" was the winner of the 1984 Nebula Award for Best Novelette, the 1985 Hugo Award for Best Novelette, the 1985 Locus Award for Best Novelette, and the 1985 Science Fiction Chronicle Award for Best Novelette. It was published in Isaac Asimov's Science Fiction Magazine in 1984, in Bloodchild and Other Stories, Four Walls Eight Windows in 1995, and by Seven Stories Press in 1996 and 2005.

Gan, the young male Terran chosen by the lead female Tlic, T’Gatoi, accepts his impending fate of being a host for her eggs and offers his body out of love, rage and desperation:

"I knew what to do, what to expect. I had been told all my life. I felt the familiar sting, narcotic, mildly pleasant. Then the blind probing of her ovipositor. The puncture was painless, easy."

— Butler, "Bloodchild," 27.

"Bloodchild" describes the unusual bond between a race of lifeforms called the Tlic and a colony of humans who have escaped Earth and settled on the Tlic planet. When the Tlic realize that humans make excellent hosts for Tlic eggs, they establish the Preserve to protect the humans, and in return require that every family choose a child for implantation.

==== Summary ====
The story is set when society is ruled by an insect-like species called the Tlics. Gan, the narrator, lives on the preserve, a protected community, where all humans or “Terrans” live. Here, each family must volunteer one child to bear the eggs of a Tlic. Gan was chosen by the Tlic T'Gatoi before he was born, which in his eyes was an honor. However, Gan starts to grow contempt and fear for T'Gatoi after he watches her perform a bloody Caesarean section on Lomas who is the human host of T'khotgif's eggs; she seems to care more for the Tlic larva than for the Terran man who was bleeding and in serious condition. After the graphic surgery was finished, T'Gatoi walked in on Gan with an illegal gun in his hand about to end his own life, realizing he had no choice but to hold T'Gatoi's children if he lived. She asked Gan if he preferred that she impregnate his sister, Xuan Hoa, instead. But out of a mix of jealousy, protectiveness, and love for his sister, he agrees to bear T'Gatoi children, under the conditions that she lets him keep the gun. She agrees and promises to take care of him.

==== Butler's inspiration ====
In many interviews and in the afterword of "Bloodchild" Butler reveals the motivation behind her writing. She wrote the story to simply explore her fears behind the parasitic botfly that she discovered while in the Amazon. She also aimed to depict a human male's experience of pregnancy "my pregnant man story" including the physical risks and the development of maternal feelings towards his alien offspring. This resulted in the creation of a story about a loving symbiotic relationship between two very different species, which Butler emphasizes is not about slavery despite some critics' interpretations. Lastly, Butler wanted to address the theme of "paying the rent" in human emigration into space, and the need for a quid pro quo or "accommodation" rather than repeating colonialist tropes in traditional science fiction.

==== Themes ====
Butler's short story "Bloodchild" disrupts many conventional categories of identity through hinting at the idea of race, gender and sexuality. She uses the concept of a human boy becoming impregnated by a female creature to reverse the roles and give the reader a point of view on birth that is different from the conventional way of thinking. It's unconventional to show a female Tlic in power over a submissive boy, especially because she is in a higher power over the other Tlics. Though T'Gatoi is in power, in a place that is conventionally held by a man, she still keeps what may be identified as feminine traits, such as kindness, empathy and understanding. Conversely, the male humans in the story sometimes exhibit a revulsion to taking on what they perceive as a female role, and experience relations with Tlics as oppression despite their own role as colonizers. The mix of unconventional ideas of gender and power go against simple binaries to reveal how identity is simply constructed through systems of control. These binaries are not innate but created by society.

==== Critical reception ====
María Ferrández San Miguel views the relationships between the Terrans and Tlics as a form of continuous traumatic stress (CTS). Ferrández cites a 2013 article from the Journal of Peace Psychology on CTS research by mental health professionals who investigated the impact of apartheid in South Africa during the 1980s. The Terrans' residence in the Preserve creates a perceived threat to their survival, leading to a symbiotic relationship between the two species rooted in fear.

Critic Jane Donawerth observes that "in this short story... the conventional adolescent male narrator/hero is punished by rape, incest, reproductive exploitation by the dominant race, and anticipation of a painful caesarean birth—and he is expected to like it, as women in many cultures have been expected to comply with their oppression." Specifically, the narrator takes on the role of black female slaves in the United States, who were "forced to carry the offspring of an alien race." Kristen Lillvis further argues that this reference to historical reproductive slavery allows the male narrator to have "access to the power of maternal love" that follows the "tradition of nonphallic maternal authority that developed out of black women's experiences during slavery."

=== "The Evening and the Morning and the Night" ===
Winner of the 1987 Science Fiction Chronicle Reader Award, and nominated for the 1987 Nebula Award for Best Novelette, The Evening and the Morning and the Night explores a world where a genetic disease has caused the appearance of a new social caste. Decades after the introduction of a successful cancer cure, it is revealed that the children of its users develop "Duryea-Gode Disease", a dangerous genetic disorder that causes "drift", a dissociative state characterized by violent psychosis and self-harm. The onset of symptoms is inevitable but can be delayed by restricting one's self to a minimal diet. The incredible violence caused by DGD patients experiencing drift has caused people with this disease to be shunned by society.

The short story follows Lynn, a second generation DGD patient as she visits Dilg, a retreat specifically designed to safely house DGD patients experiencing drift and bring them under control by encouraging creative behavior and artistic expression.

=== "Near of Kin" ===
Published in Chrysalis 4 in 1979; in Bloodchild and Other Stories, Four Walls Eight Windows in 1995; by Seven Stories Press in 1996 and 2005.

"Near of Kin" relates a discussion between a girl and her uncle. Having recently lost her mother, the girl confides in her uncle about the lack of relationship that she had with her mother, as she was left to be raised by her grandmother. The girl and her uncle talk around a family secret that the girl felt was the justification of her abandonment. She compares her looks and personality with that of her uncle, seeking confirmation that she was his child. With this knowledge, the girl finds understanding for her abandonment and neglect.

In her afterword, Butler explains that the influences for "Near of Kin" come from her Baptist background and incestuous Bible stories such as those of Lot's daughters, Abraham's sister-wife, and the sons of Adam having sex with the daughters of Eve.

=== "Speech Sounds" ===
Winner of the 1984 Hugo Award for Best Short Story, "Speech Sounds" explores a universe where a virus has eradicated speech.

=== "Crossover" ===
Published in Clarion in 1971, "Crossover" tells the tale of a lonely woman who is employed in an unsatisfactory factory job and grappling with alcohol dependency. During the three-month imprisonment of her partner, the protagonist pondered the possibility of suicide, but ultimately did not follow through with it. Instead, her behavior becomes increasingly self-destructive as she resorts to alcohol as a means of coping and escaping the reality of her life. The protagonist's frequent visits to the liquor store are indicative of her reliance on alcohol to ease her struggles.

In the afterword, Butler explains how the characters in "Crossover" were influenced by her old, dull jobs and the strange people she met while doing them, as well as her own fears of failing as a writer.

=== "Amnesty" ===
Published on SciFi.com, January 22, 2003; later included in Bloodchild and Other Stories, Seven Stories Press in 2005.

In "Amnesty", Noah, the main character, meets with prospective human employees for the Communities, an alien species that has taken over Earth's desert areas. Noah, who was abducted by the Communities when she was a child, attempts to convince the humans to overcome their fear of the aliens so they can prosper alongside them. During her pitch, Noah compares her experiences with both the Communities and the humans. Despite being treated as a lab experiment by the aliens, Noah stated that she never once faced as much cruelty as she did once her own government captured her after being released by the Communities. As a result of her experiences with both aliens and humans, Noah has become one of thirty "translators" to participate in the enfolding process which allows communication with the Communities and also enforces a bond between humans and aliens.

In her afterword to "Amnesty", Butler explains that the story was inspired by Dr. Wen Ho Lee's wrongful imprisonment for espionage by the US government.

One of the main themes of "Amnesty" is fear, mostly the fear the humans have of the alien Communities. Claire Curtis discusses this fear as a natural and rather overwhelming feeling. She states that humans do things simply out of fear, whether it's fear for others, fear for ourselves, fear of the unknown or, more importantly, fear of the known. "Amnesty" explores the idea that people are so afraid of the Communities simply because humans know nothing of who the aliens are, how they function, or what their intentions are. It is because of fear that humans turn to destruction rather than collaboration. Elisa Edward also discusses how the human race is fearful of their existence and how fear is turned into anger and frustration towards the Communities.

One of the most discussed themes in "Amnesty" is the use of violence by both the alien Communities and the U.S. government against Noah. However, the alien communities stopped using violence against humans once they learned more about them. Elisa Edwards points out the U.S. government's violent behavior towards the alien Communities' "collaborators". As she explains, violence is acceptable when it is used for "the greater good for mankind." She discusses this violent behavior as means for the U.S. government to protect humanity and to ensure its survival. Noah, who was considered a traitor and a collaborator, had to endure physical and psychological torture in the hands of the U.S. government because it was willing to act unethically towards humans in order to destroy their enemies.

Another theme that defines many aspects within the short story "Amnesty" is the human need for dominance, which Sarah Outterson describes as the main issue faced by the human race. There is never a concern for learning, or collaboration between the two species, just the overwhelming fear of the "imminent destruction of the human race as they know it."

=== "The Book of Martha" ===
Published on SciFi.com, May 21, 2003; later included in Bloodchild and Other Stories, Seven Stories Press in 2005.

"The Book of Martha" is a story about trying to create a perfect world. God gives a woman named Martha the task of helping humans become less destructive. Although afraid of making mistakes and resentful of God for the way he had designed the world, Martha eventually starts to create ways that she can help humanity. God shoots down some of her early ideas, explaining the unintended consequences, but Martha ultimately resolves to give people vivid, life-like dreams every night, for a more fulfilling life. She later adds that once the people wake up from these dreams, they become aware of their potential. This is bittersweet for Martha because, as a novelist, she knows that people will no longer read books for pleasure, since they will be seeking pleasure in their dreams. She is willing to risk her career, and the life that she has made for herself from writing novels, just so that everyone in the world can have some sort of fantasy that would make them better people.

In the afterword to "The Book of Martha", Butler realizes that everyone has a different idea of perfection, making the task from God seemingly impossible. Each person's utopia would be another person's hell due to the different wants and desires. Butler wrote "The Book of Martha" to express her belief that utopias can only exist in our individual dreams.

In "The Book of Martha", Butler questions society's authority over individuals' interpretations of God. Her story strongly focuses on religion and how it "polices the borders of social value and disvalue" by raising certain members of society above others. Butler's de-gendering of God throughout "The Book of Martha" is evidence of the inequality in the perception of God by society. Butler writes to encourage minorities to question society's approach to labeling groups by color, class, and gender.

== Essays ==
=== "Positive Obsession" ===
"Positive Obsession" was first published in 1989 under the title "Birth of a Writer" in Essence magazine. It is an autobiographical essay structured as a series of memories and reflections. In it, Butler describes how she became a successful science fiction and fantasy writer against many odds and in great part due to her mother's encouragement.

Butler begins her narrative with a vignette in which her mother tricks her six-year-old self into reading at bedtime. A few years later, she began telling herself stories whenever she had no stories to read; she then began to write these stories down.

She then recalls two moments when the restrictions of American racial segregation challenged her passion for reading and writing. When she was ten, her fear of entering a white-owned bookstore was surpassed by her desire to own her first new book. At thirteen, she doggedly refused to give in to her aunt's view that writing was not a viable job for a black person in America.

Next, Butler recounts the effects of her extreme shyness, which was partly brought on by low self-esteem and other children's bullying, and which many adults mistook as slowness. Writing became Butler's means to hide from the world and also to reimagine herself.

Butler shifts from her own struggles as a youth to explain her mother's passion for learning. She was put to work at a young age and so wanted her daughter to have the education she had been denied. One way she did this was to recover all types of books out of the trash of her white employers to give to her daughter.

Butler then identifies her desire to sell a story as her own "positive obsession"—her means to do what she wants to do. She remembers how, as a young adult, she attempted to navigate the publication process but could not understand why her stories were rejected; how an agent took advantage of her ignorance and swindled her mother by asking for compensation to read one of her stories; how, though she was attending college, she had trouble getting appropriate feedback for her writing from her teachers.

Her vindication finally comes when one of her short stories wins the first prize in a school contest. After college, she supports herself by working low-paying jobs and getting up at two in the morning to write even though she was full of self doubt about her talent. When she becomes a published writer, she uses her money to pay the mortgage on her mother's house.

Butler concludes the piece by noting that now that she is a successful science fiction and fantasy writer, she is often interrogated on the usefulness of her writing to black people; for her, the answer to this constant questioning is obvious: science fiction as a genre that proposes alternative realities and behaviors, discusses the potential consequences of scientific and technological progress, and critiques socio-political organization, may allow blacks to imagine themselves as other than they have been defined by American society and history.

=== "Furor Scribendi" ===
This essay was originally published in L. Ron Hubbard Presents Writers of the Future, Vol. IX. Los Angeles: Bridge Publications, 1993. "Furor Scribendi" is written as practical advice to new writers on the habits that lead to publication. As Butler comments on how solitary and frustrating writing for publication is, she suggests developing a set of specific writing practices: 1. Read every day; 2. Take writing classes and workshops; 3. Write every day; 4. Revise thoroughly; 5. Submit your work for publication even if you get rejected often; 6. "Persist." This last habit, Butler contends, is more important to a writer than talent, inspiration, or even imagination.

The Afterword to "Furor Scribendi", which Butler translates as "A Rage for Writing" or "Positive Obsession", reveals that Butler considered persistence as her true "talent" or "habit" as a writer.

== Reception ==
Reviewers of this short story collection were generally impressed by the quality and "its diversity of subject matter." Janet St. John concluded that "although this book is little 'compact' in size, its ideas are splendidly large" and that "Butler's imagination is strong --- so is her awareness of how to work real issues subtly into the text of her fiction." The reviewers also discovered, across her stories "whether she is dealing with the role of medical science, biological determinism, the politics of disease, or complex interrelations of race, class, and gender, [that] Butler's dystopian imagination challenges us to think the worst in complex ways while simultaneously planting utopian seeds of hope."

J. Miller from the American Book Review observed that "Octavia Butler's works is science fiction at its best. The fictions in Bloodchild and other stories get us off the beaten track and encourage us to think differently about the way we live, the way we treat ourselves and each other. This makes Octavia Butler not just a good science-fiction writer, but also one of the most interesting and innovative political writers around today." Janet St. John saw Butler as "making writing a habit," and she supplemented our understanding of that with "her first hand analysis and discussion of the impetus and influence in her own work". She explained that the "enlightening" and "inspirational" afterwords that follow each story or novella contain "a refreshing look into Butler's writing process and helps to clarify what excites and motivates." As Gerald Jonas of The New York Times views it, "Bloodchild and other stories is a fine example of how science fiction, by subverting expectations, can jar us into a new appreciation of familiar truths."
