= McGaffin =

Family name

MacGaffin, McGaffin
- Language: Irish

Origin
- Meaning: Son of Eachán
- Region of origin: Northern Ireland

Other names
- Variant forms: Eachán; Mac Eacháin;

MacGaffin and McGaffin are Northern Irish surnames. They are Anglicisations of the Irish language Mac Eacháin, meaning "son of Eachán". The personal name Eachán is a diminutive of the personal name Eachaidh, which is based upon the Gaelic each, meaning "horse".
