= Gahan =

- Language: Irish

Origin
- Meaning: Descendant of Gaoithín
- Region of origin: Ireland

Other names
- Variant forms: Ó Gaoithín, Gaoithin, Wynne, Wyndham Guiheen, Guihan

Gahan is a surname of Irish origin. It derives from the Irish language name Ó Gaoithín, meaning "descendant of Gaoithín". The Ó Gaoithín were historically chiefs of Síol Éalaigh and today are most prevalent in south-eastern Ireland, particularly in the counties of Wexford and Carlow. Connacht Ó Gaoithíns were typically anglicised as Wynne or Wyndham and are of an unrelated origin to the Leinster Ó Gaoithíns.

People with this surname include:

- Arthur Burton Gahan (1880–1960), American entomologist.
- Charles Joseph Gahan (1862–1939), Irish entomologist.
- Dave Gahan (born 1962) (not his birth name), British singer.
- George Thomas Gahan (1912–1980), Australian politician and boxer.
- Gordon Gahan (1945–1984), American photographer.
- Graeme Gahan (1942–2018), Australian rules footballer.
- John Harvey Gahan (1888–1958), Canadian violinist.
- Matthew Gahan (born 1975), Australian baseball player.
- Thomas Gahan (1847–1905), American politician.
- Tracy Gahan (born 1980), Australian basketball player.
- William Gahan (1732–1804), Irish priest.
- Gahan Wilson (1930–2019), American horror–fantasy cartoonist and illustrator

== See also ==
- Gaughran (disambiguation)
