= Alexis Pauline Gumbs =

American writer (born 1982)

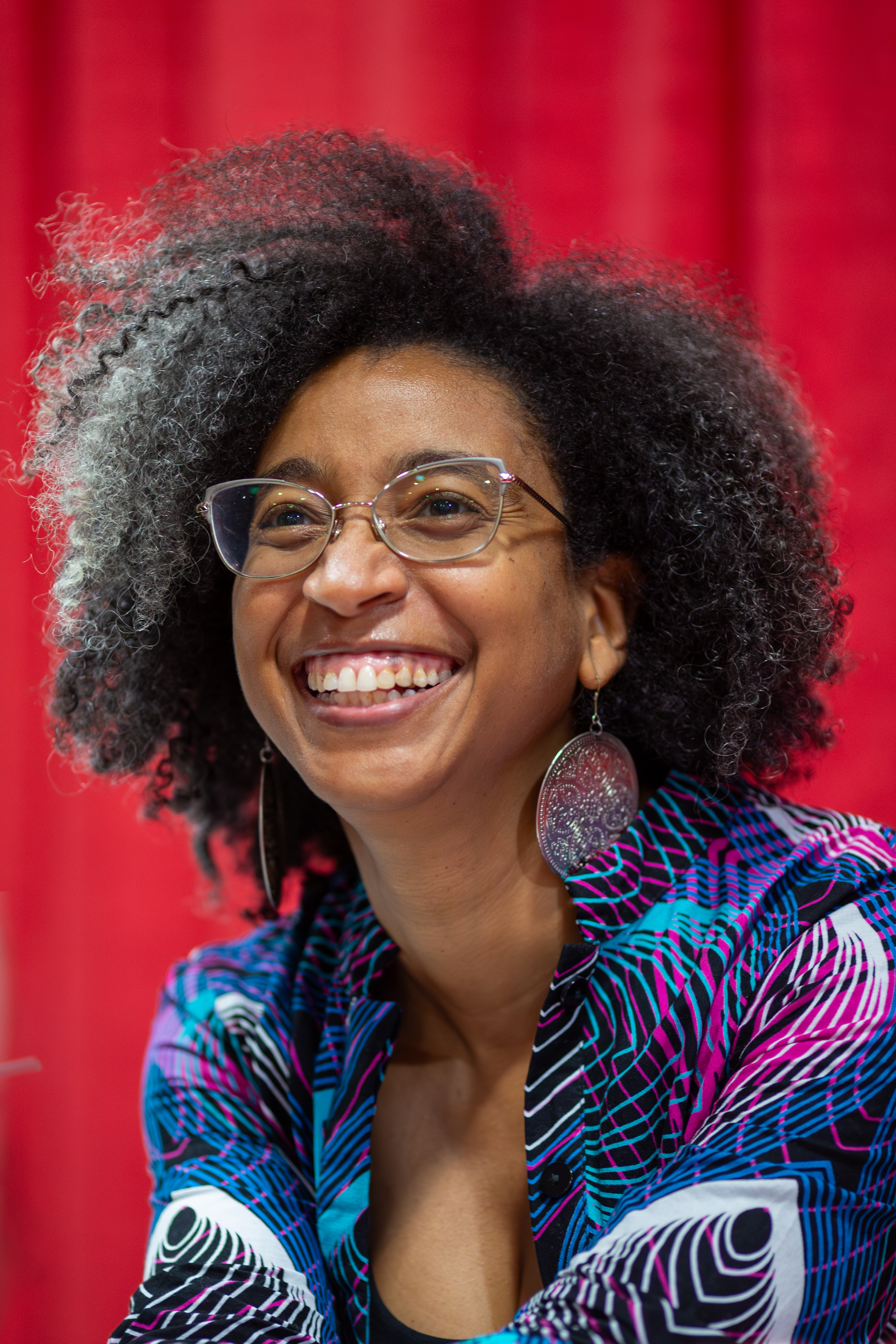
- Gumbs at the 2024 National Book Festival
- Born: 1982 (age 43–44); Summit, New Jersey, U.S.
- Education: Barnard College (2004); Duke University (2010)
- Occupation: Author
- Writing career
- Notable works: Spill: Scenes of Black Feminist Fugitivity; M Archive: After the End of the World; Undrowned
- Website: alexispauline.com

Alexis Pauline Gumbs (born 1982) is an African-American writer, scholar, poet, activist, and educator based in Durham, North Carolina. Gumbs' work focuses on queer women of color and has been described as a “Black feminist love evangelist.” Gumbs describes herself (Note: Gumbs uses both she/her and they/them pronouns. This article uses she/her for consistency.) as a "queer Black troublemaker." In her experimental triptych Spill, M Archive, Dub, Gumbs explores Black feminist theory and the struggle against ecological extraction.

== Early life and education ==
Alexis Gumbs was born in 1982 in Summit, New Jersey.

Gumbs graduated from Barnard College in 2004. She holds a PhD in English, African and African-American studies, and women and gender studies from Duke University.

== Career ==
Gumbs is the founder and director of Eternal Summer of the Black Feminist Mind and founder of BrokenBeautiful Press. She was the dramaturge for Sharon Bridgforth's "Dat Black Mermaid Man Lady". She and Ṣangodare co-founded the Black Feminist Film School.

Gumbs has spent the majority of her career as an independent writer and scholar outside of formal academic institutions. Gumbs teaches online seminars, writes blog posts, and runs webinars through her website Brilliance Remastered. She has participated in conversations about how intellectual work can be more path-breaking and widely accessible outside of the academy.

She characterizes her writing as defying genre categorization. Her writing and activism are influenced by the work of her grandmother, Lydia Gumbs, who designed the flag of Anguilla during the country's 1967 revolution, as well as Audre Lorde, June Jordan, M. Jacqui Alexander, and Dionne Brand. Gumbs attributes her desire to attend Barnard College partially to June Jordan, Zora Neale Hurston, Ntozake Shange, and Edwidge Danticat.

She featured in the documentary The Revival: Women and the Word in 2016. She was a creative writing fellow of the National Endowment for the Arts and Whiting Award for Nonfiction winner in 2022. She was awarded a Windham Campbell Prize for poetry in 2023. She was formerly the creative writing editor at Feminist Studies.

From 2017 to 2019, Gumbs was the visiting Winton Chair in the Liberal Arts in the University of Minnesota's Department of Theater Arts and Dance. From 2023 to 2024 she was the visiting Sterling Brown Chair at Williams College.

== Works ==
She wrote a short story for Octavia’s Brood: Science Fiction Stories from Social Justice Movements (2015), edited by adrienne maree brown and Walidah Imarisha.

Gumbs co-edited Revolutionary Mothering: Love on the Frontlines (2016) with Mai’a Williams and China Martens. This book focuses on the activity of mothering.

Spill: Scenes of Black Feminist Fugitivity (2017) is the first book in a trilogy and is a poetry collection in dialogue with Hortense Spillers’ Black, White, and in Color anthology. The poems explores how Black women can use poetry for liberation.

M Archive: After the End of the World (2018), the second book in the trilogy, centers on concepts of Black life and Black metaphysics from a feminist perspective and is in conversation with Pedagogies of Crossing by M. Jacqui Alexander. She invites readers to be mindful of ongoing societal issues like environmental degradation, anti-Black racism, and corrupt capitalist systems through recognizing Indigenous knowledge systems and Black writers' work. In the format of a “speculative documentary,” Gumbs highlights the ideologies of feminist theory, rooted in the metaphysical, to demonstrate the unsustainable nature of modern life and the issues with relying on digital archives.

In DUB: Finding Ceremony (2020), the third book of Gumbs’ trilogy, she encourages readers to think critically about the connection between the individual and the collective, using marine life as a metaphor for the Black social condition. Gumbs draws on Jamaican writer Sylvia Wynter as well as dub music for inspiration. It emphasizes interspecies relations and Black feminist theory.

Undrowned: Black Feminist Lessons from Marine Mammals (2020) reflects on marine mammal behavior's ideological and cultural significance to discuss how society undervalues Black women and humans' connection to nature. Gumbs divides her book into twenty sections, with the first nineteen using different marine mammals' behaviors to help Black women navigate the struggles of modern American life.

In 2024, she published Survival Is a Promise, a biography of Audre Lorde.

She wrote the foreword for This Unruly Witness: June Jordan's Legacy (2025), edited by Darrell M. Callier, Dominique C. Hill, Lauren Muller, and Becky Thompson.
