= Multiracial feminist theory =

Aspect of feminist scholarship

Multiracial feminist theory is a theoretical framework that emerged from the scholarship and activism of women of color (WOC), gaining prominence during the second-wave feminist movement. Multiracial feminism has been described as a "liberation movement spearheaded by women of color" that focuses primarily on intersectional analysis and an international and multiracial approach to oppression.

== Overview ==
Multiracial feminist theory is rooted in critiques of "normative accounts" of the second-wave feminist movement, which are criticized for predominantly focusing on the experiences of white and middle-class women and failing to acknowledge women of color's contributions to women's liberation movements.

This theory maintains that mainstream accounts of feminist activism do not adequately address the overlap between racism and misogyny in how women of color navigate oppression. This body of scholarship "does not offer a singular or unified feminism but a body of knowledge situating women and men in multiple systems of domination".

Scholars and communities of women refer to multiracial feminist theory using different terms. For instance, Professor Chela Sandoval uses the term "U.S. Third World Feminisms," which aims to map out how social efforts of U.S. and global political opposition intersect.

== History ==
First gaining momentum in the 1970s, multiracial feminism developed as a movement that analyzed race, class, and gender as interlocking identities that confer both privilege and oppression. Becky Thompson, Seung-kyung Kim, Carole McCann and other scholars have noted how second-wave feminism was inspired by other political movements in the 1960s and 1970s, such as the Black Power, New Left, and Civil Rights movements.

Feminists who came together in the movement believed that sexism was not the sole root of women's oppression and that "cross-racial struggle made clear the work that white women needed to do in order for cross-racial sisterhood to really be powerful."

Many organizations that identify with multiracial feminism are focused on a distinct intersection of identities. Examples include Hijas de Cuauhtémoc, a Chicana feminist group, and the Los Angeles-based Asian Sisters (later Asian Women's Center), who formed in the 1970s response to a drug abuse outbreak among young Japanese-American women.

== Application ==
A fundamental tenet of multiracial feminist theory is the requirement of intersectionality to broaden contemporary feminist discourse.

Family study, formation, and power relations have been extensively examined using a multiracial feminist approach, revealing a hidden power dynamic between "advantaged families and disadvantaged families." Advantaged families have been shown to rely on the labor and disadvantage of poorer families, women, women of color, minorities, and immigrants.

Women of color provide an "outsider within" perspective as they are active participants in dominance while simultaneously being oppressed by it. In understanding multiracial feminism, interlocking forms of oppression persist to marginalize groups of people. While some individuals remain oppressed, others are privileged.

Patricia Hill Collins defines the term Matrix of Domination to refer to how various forms of oppression operate differently depending on one's social location. In reference to this term, individuals will have varying experiences with gender, class, race, and sexuality based on their social position relative to structural powers. In terms of interlocking oppressions, this results in different social groups experiencing varying degrees of subordination and privilege.

== Activism ==
Although women of color are rarely credited as being prominent in the second-wave feminist movement, multiracial feminism was evident in the 1970s, 1980s, and continues today.

In the 1970s, women of color worked alongside hegemonic, white feminist groups but found them to be largely centered on the white, middle-class feminist issues of the time. With the help of white, anti-racist women, women of color gave rise to multiracial feminist theory and led to the development of organizations created by and for women of color.

Multiracial feminists of the 1980s challenged white feminism by articulating the individual experiences of women of color, immigrants, and "third-world women" who had been largely marginalized. This was mainly achieved through multiracial feminist writings, some of which date back to the 1960s.

=== Online activism ===
There has been a consistent presence of multiracial feminists, journalists, and scholars utilizing online media to theorize and write about intersectionality and the multiracial experience as it relates collaboratively to class, gender, and race.

In 2020, journalist Janell Hobson published a critique of white feminist activism in Ms. magazine, stressing the exclusion of women of color from contemporary feminist discourse and arguing for the necessity of feminists to "reclaim solidarity" by acknowledging race and gender as intertwined issues. Similarly, Lara Witt, writing for Rewire News Group, drew upon her own experience of privilege and oppression to understand her role as a multiracial feminist addressing racism against Black, Hispanic, and Indian people.

Also in 2020, Mikki Kendall’s book, Hood Feminism, called attention to the valorization of "fierce" women by white feminism, noting: "The women most likely to be called fierce are also the most likely to be facing the greatest social risks."

==== Recent Developments (2022–2025) ====
Since 2022, digital activism informed by multiracial feminism has seen a noticeable shift toward transnational analysis and critiques of technology.

- Transnational Intersectional Focus: Online activism has expanded to include global solidarity campaigns, such as documenting feminist organizing in the Global South and supporting international movements like the #WomanLifeFreedom movement. Research suggests that a feminist identity is a consistent predictor of engaging in transnational online petition signing.
- Critique of Artificial Intelligence (AI): A significant modern focus involves applying intersectional analysis to critique technology and governance. Scholars and activists highlight how algorithmic bias in AI systems can perpetuate and deepen discrimination against women and racially marginalized groups. This work emphasizes the need for AI governance frameworks rooted in feminist principles of fairness and accountability.
- Youth-Led Activism and Counter-Narratives: Platforms like Instagram and TikTok are crucial for young activists. The work of young Black activists, such as Marley Dias, demonstrates how social media is used to promote Black Feminist Thought and racial justice by creating digital counter-narratives that challenge systemic marginalization and foster cultural resilience.
- Digital Commodification and Exclusion: Critics analyze the inherent tensions in digital activism, noting how the emphasis on creating visually appealing content and demonstrating specific "know-how" for online participation can lead to new class- and race-based exclusions. Furthermore, the commodification and aestheticization of anti-racist discourse by platform algorithms risk depoliticizing the message.

== Organizations ==
Representative organizations include:

- Combahee River Collective, a Black feminist group that started in 1974 and influenced the inclusion of multiracial feminism in second-wave feminism. They created a Black Feminist Statement to express their political views and desired changes.
- Women of All Red Nations (WARN), a feminist group created by Native American women in 1974 to fight the promotion and practice of sterilization in Native communities.
- Hijas de Cuauhtémoc. In 1971, a group of Chicanas created one of the earliest feminist organizations of the second wave, motivated by sexual harassment within the Chicano Movement. The revolutionary group was named after the Mexican underground newspaper, Hijas de Cuauhtémoc. Some of the founders also launched the first Chicana feminist journal, Encuentro Feminil.

== Notable proponents ==
Key figures who have contributed to multiracial feminist theory include:

- Maxine Baca Zinn, a sociologist recognized as one of the "foremothers of multiracial feminism." Working alongside other feminist theorists like Bonnie Thornton Dill, Patricia Hill Collins, and Lynn Weber, Baca Zinn's hypotheses emphasize the necessity of intersectional analysis in contemporary feminism.
- Bonnie Thornton Dill, a dean and professor at the University of Maryland. She has received numerous awards for mentoring, including the Jessie Bernard Award from the American Sociological Association.
- Becky Thompson, Ph.D., a human rights activist and feminist activist focusing on anti-racism, gender, and class issues.
- Patricia Hill Collins, known for her article "Learning from the Outsider Within," published in 1986. She is a professor of race studies and feminist studies at the University of Maryland.
- bell hooks, an American author, professor, feminist, and social activist. The focus of hooks' writing was to explore the intersectionality of race, capitalism, gender, and their capacity to produce and perpetuate systems of oppression and class domination.
- Audre Lorde an American writer, feminist, womanist, librarian and civil rights activist. She was a self-described "black, lesbian, mother, warrior, poet" who "dedicated both her life and her creative talent to confronting and addressing injustices of racism, sexism, classism, and homophobia."

== Criticism ==
Multiracial feminism is still considered a relatively recent concept in quantitative research and has struggled to gain momentum. Some criticisms have been raised questioning whether multiracial feminist theory can produce measurable results due to a lack of "existing survey tools" by which to quantify or examine those experiences. However, Catherine Harnois writes in her book, Feminist Measure in Survey Research, that multiracial feminism may be more beneficial to feminist discourse than once assumed.

== See also ==
- Feminist theory § History of feminist theory
- Intersectionality § Historical background
- Feminism and racism
