= Take-home naloxone program =

A take-home naloxone program is a governmental program that provides naloxone drug kits to those that are at risk of an opioid overdose. Naloxone is a medication that was created to reverse opioid overdoses. As an opioid antagonist, it binds to the μ-opioid receptors blocking the opioid's effects. Naloxone quickly restores normal respiration. The ongoing opioid epidemic has caused many public health authorities to expand access to naloxone.

== History ==
Naloxone was created in a laboratory, patented in 1961, and approved by the FDA a decade later. It was first proposed in the 1990s for community-based provisions of take-home naloxone rescue kits (THN) to opioid users, which involved training opioid users, along with their family or friends, in awareness, emergency management, and administration of naloxone. Police have been carrying naloxone in their squad cars since the mid-2000s. Paramedics have been carrying it since the release, however EMT's have started carrying it since the earlier 2000s. In 2010, there were 30 states with programs for take-home naloxone. In 2016, almost every state enacted legislation addressing this epidemic, and reinstated it in 2017.

== Administration ==
There are three ways to administer naloxone. The first method is intravenous, working within two minutes. The second is through the nose (intranasal), or it could be injected into the muscles (intramuscular) which works within 5 minutes. Most likely, more than one dose will be needed. The effects only last about half an hour. Naloxone is administered from home kits either by nasal spray or injection into the thigh.

== Effectiveness ==
A systematic review of previous nine studies found that naloxone successfully reversed overdose used by participants in all but one study. The curriculum for training participants included recognizing an overdose, how to prevent one, how to appropriately respond to an overdose, and administer naloxone correctly and safely. The researchers found that the amount of time to train participants varied in the studies, some taking 10 minutes to hours. Eleven studies reported 100% survival rate, and the remaining articles reported 83% to 93% survival rates. Multiple articles' results suggest that programs trained laypersons to respond to and treat opioid overdoses correctly, which resulted in thousands of lives being saved.

Another systematic review utilized the Bradford Hill criteria, They found that twenty-one of the twenty-two studies they used to meet the Bradford-Hill criterion were cost-effective, and ongoing projects were able to access and train high-risk populations, which resulted in a low amount of adverse withdrawal effects. The programs reduced the number of deaths-by-overdose among the participants and their acquaintances. The review also found no evidence of increased heroin usage among the compiled studies. In fact, they found that a few studies had participants that reduced their drug usage, or in other studies that it had not changed. A limitation of their study was noted that the majority (90%) of reversed overdoses were heroin-induced when a study recruited methadone users specifically. Take-home naloxone programs have also been implemented overseas in Europe, Asia, and Australia, but studies of these programs used uncontrolled study designs.

== CDC Reports ==
=== Prevention program report ===
According to the CDC, deaths from drug overdoses have more than doubled since 1999 in the U.S. 43, 982 deaths-by-overdose, whether unintentional, intentional, or undetermined intent were reported during 2013. Of these, 37% were from opioid prescriptions, and 19% were from heroin. The number of programs providing laypersons with training and take-home naloxone kits has been increasing since 1996. 136 of 140 organizations completed a survey for the Harm Reduction Coalition (HRC) in July 2014 that were known to provide naloxone take-home kits to laypersons in the United States. Between 1996 and June 2014, 152,283 people have received naloxone kits, and 26,463 reversals have been reported. People who received the kits were characterized as follows: about 82% as drug-users, 11.7% family/friends, 3.3% service providers, or 3.4% unknown. The HRC created a database of organizations, such as public health departments, pharmacies, substance use treatment facilities and more, who provide naloxone kits. Sixty-eight organizations reported that approximately 83% of laypersons who said they administered naloxone were users, approximately 10% were family and friends, under 1% were service providers, and 7% were unknown. According to forty-two organizations, 81.6% of the reversed overdoses involved heroin, and 14.1% were prescribed opioids. 90 organizations reported having distributed 140,053 vials, including refills, the year prior. Three operational organizations did not respond, and the remaining forty-three reported not yet distributing naloxone take-home kits. Sixty-nine organizations reported providing injectable naloxone only. Fifty-one organizations reported providing intranasal naloxone only. While sixteen organizations reported providing both. There were 111,602 injectable naloxone vials distributed in total, and 28,446 intranasal vials of naloxone. Of the responding organizations, approximately 30% reported trouble sustaining competent supply, while 54% reported deficient resources to sustain supplies to disperse kits. These numbers have increased substantially from a survey conducted in 2010. There used to be only 43 organizations, now there are 644 local sites providing naloxone instead of only 188. This is a 243% increase. In conclusion, the CDC has determined that these programs are safe and cost-effective. In fact, international health organizations recommend providing take-home naloxone kits.

=== Harm reduction coalition report ===
This report supports what the Center for Disease Control (CDC) reported. As previously stated, 644 local, community-based opioid overdose prevention programs have been reported operating by June 2014. These programs provide training and take-home naloxone kits to laypersons who may experience an overdose situation. From the 644 programs, 26,463 overdose reversals have been reported after training and equipping 152,283 people to reverse the overdose. This is a significant increase from 2010 by 99,251 people and up 16,292 saved lives. Forty-three thousand, nine-hundred eighty-two deaths were reported in 2013, of which eight thousand two hundred fifty-seven were from heroin overdoses and sixteen thousand two hundred thirty-five were from prescription opioids. Since 2014, when this article was published, 30 states and D.C. have programs, but with that, there are still 20 states without programs. The HRC published this article in hopes to encourage states that do not have programs to convince them that the programs are valuable.

=== Preventing opioid overdose report ===
This report states that 174 people are dying from opioid overdoses every day in the United States. As programs have been conducted and studied in urban cities, which have been deemed successful, this report is to determine the feasibility of take-home naloxone programs in rural settings. West Virginia University Injury Control Research Center (WVU ICRC) researchers questioned whether these programs would work in rural areas as it does in the cities. The researchers worked with WVU's Clinical and Translational Science Institute and the state's regional Substance Abuse Task Force to conduct the study in rural West Virginia (WV). Specific details were not reported in this article, however, they did conclude that it would be adaptable to rural WV prescription opioid users. These findings were brought to legislators, key health care and injury prevention professionals, substance abuse treatment and recovery specialists, and state advisory groups and coalitions who were pressured to start pilot programs which lead to the ICRC organizing a state-level, momentous meeting with others from organizations including the Director of Project Lazarus from North Carolina to provide more data. They agreed on the need to take part in the take-home naloxone initiatives in West Virginia. Programs and bills were created to distribute naloxone to laypersons across the state.

== Good samaritan laws ==
In 2015, a majority of the 52,000 overdose deaths were due to opioids in America. Almost every state enacted legislation addressing this epidemic and reinstated it in 2017. Until recently, access to naloxone has been limited until there were specific statutory protections for non-medical professionals to obtain and administer the drug. It is prohibited, however, to give this medication to anyone who is not an at-risk drug user. Before prescriptions for naloxone can be written, there needs to be a decent doctor-patient relationship established.

Versions of Good Samaritan laws or 911 drug immunity laws were enacted in 40 states and D.C. When experiencing or observing an overdose, there is immunity from arrest, charge, or prosecution for specific controlled substance possession and paraphernalia offenses. Some state laws have increased immunity which covers violations of pretrial, probation, or parole conditions and violations of protection or restraining orders. Be advised that these laws vary by state, some state immunity laws are more limited than others. When a possible overdose is reported, the caller must have the reasonable belief that an overdose is occurring and that they are calling in good faith, which is regularly included in the law to exclude seeking help during the execution of a search warrant or arrest. Another point is that some laws do not consider immunity as grounds to prevent the collection of evidence for a different crime(s). Additional requirements are that one must remain at the emergency until help arrives and cooperating with emergency personnel.

Those who may not qualify for Good Samaritan immunity might be able to enter into a drug diversion program or drug treatment court. Most states have these types of statutory programs, as well as other programs which were created by local jurisdictions. Funding for these has been increasingly provided by the states. At least 12 states funded, authorized, or expanded medication-assisted treatment opportunities during 2015 for those involved in the justice system.

== Emergency responders ==
A study published by Massachusett in 2014 looked into when how first-responders interacted with opioid overdoses and needing to use naloxone in the field. Paramedics were the only ones legally allowed to use the overdose reversal drug when it was patented. The rise in overdoses was driven by analgesic medications. Programs for take-home naloxone have started, with reports of lowered overdose deaths. Within the last decade, access has expanded to EMTs and police officers. Emergency first-responders administer naloxone intranasally. Before 2013, only eight states allowed EMTs to be able to administer naloxone, then five more states changed the policies or laws, totaling thirteen states in 2013. This was a much-needed improvement because paramedics are outnumbered by EMTs nationwide. Boston EMS was approved to train EMTs to carry and administer intranasal naloxone in 2005. This expanded to allow municipal EMS in 2012. In 2010, Revere, MA became the first fire department to join the Overdose Education and Naloxone Distribution (OEND) pilot program, which required them to report every overdose outcome. Firefighters administered naloxone 114 times in the following three years. Also in 2010, the Quincy, MA police department became the first to join the program. They administered naloxone 201 times between 2010 and 2013. Each kit's expense was approximately forty-three dollars. New hires and continuous educational training costs have been incorporated into the education programs. Unfortunately, there was no evidence yet to determine if the programs have effectively reduced the fatal opioid overdoses.
