= Adrienne maree brown =

American writer and activist (born 1978)

adrienne maree brown
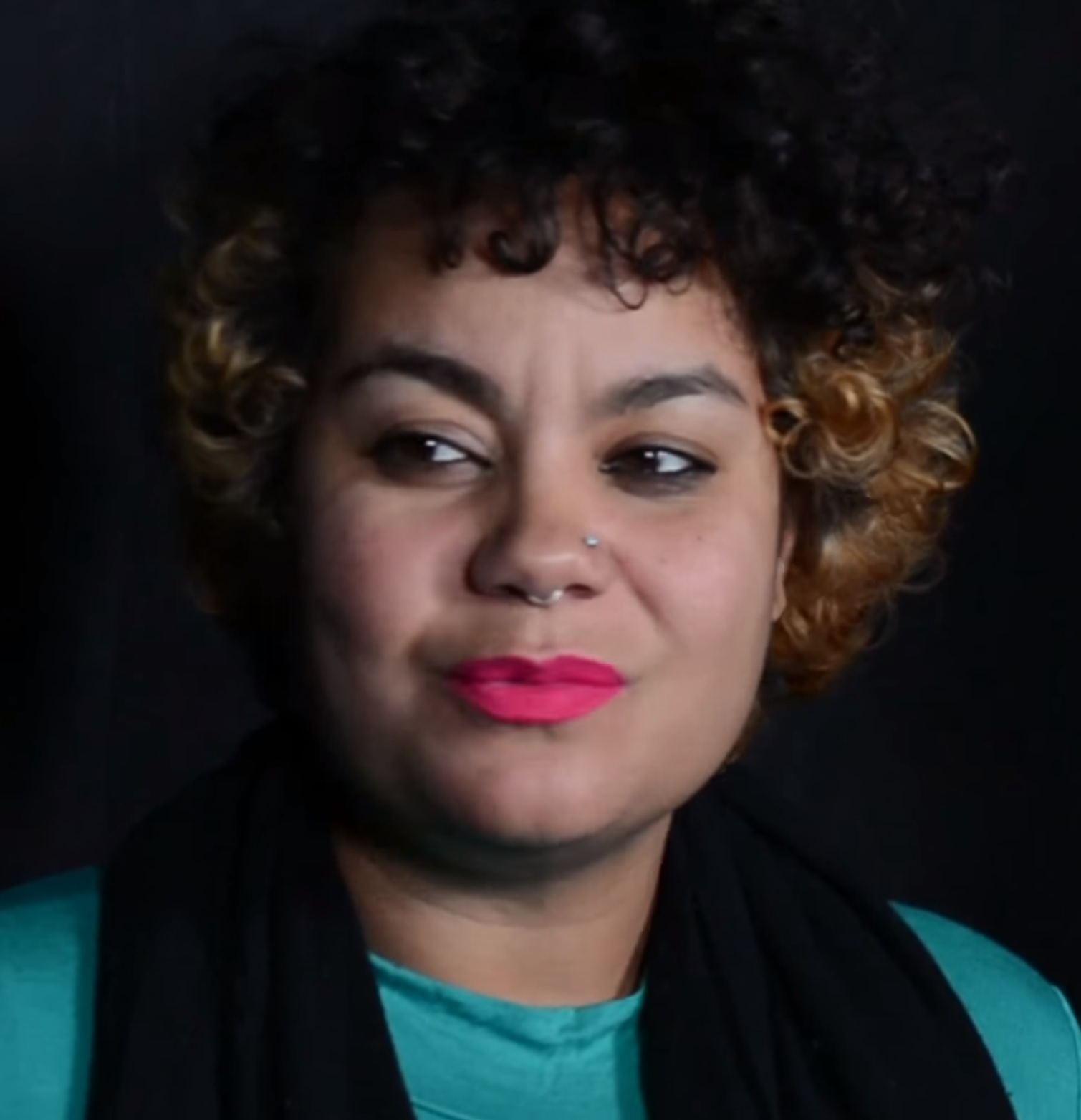
- Brown in 2015
- Born: September 6, 1978 (age 48); El Paso, Texas, US
- Education: Columbia University
- Occupation: Writer
- Writing career
- Genres: Afrofuturism, science fiction, non-fiction; creative non-fiction
- Subjects: Activism; Community Organizing; Afrofuturism; Black Feminism; Facilitation; Social Justice; Climate Justice
- Website: adriennemareebrown.net

Adrienne Maree Brown, often styled adrienne maree brown (born September 6, 1978), is an American writer, activist and facilitator. From 2006 to 2010, she was executive director of the Ruckus Society. She also co-founded and directed the United States League of Young Voters. Brown describes her thought as postnationalism, and others have described it as Black feminism or womanism. She also supports, among others, the Black Lives Matter and prison abolition movements.

Much of her work as a writer is based on the writings of science-fiction author Octavia E. Butler. Her first book, Emergent Strategy, was published in 2017. Other books include Pleasure Activism: The Politics of Feeling Good, published in 2019, and We Will Not Cancel Us, published in 2020. Brown also runs podcasts and has released a music project. Additionally, she works as a doula.

== Life and activism ==
=== Early life ===
Brown was born on September 6, 1978, in El Paso, Texas, to a mixed-race couple who met at Clemson University in South Carolina. She is the eldest of three children. Her father was in the military and she spent much of her childhood abroad in Germany (see United States military deployments), as well as in Georgia, New York, and California. As mixed-race children, Brown and her sisters experienced racism in school.

Brown attended Columbia University where she studied African American Studies, political science, and voice. She was at the university when Amadou Diallo was killed by police officers in 1999. She cites this time as being pivotal to the development of her political consciousness, especially regarding issues of policing and race. She is pansexual and has recounted experiences with homophobia and sexual assault.

After graduating from Columbia, brown began working with the Harm Reduction Coalition in Brooklyn, and served as a social justice facilitator at the Social Forum. She moved to Detroit in 2009 after being invited to consult with Detroit Summer in 2006, and after dating Detroit-based rapper Invincible.

=== Activism in Detroit and onwards ===
From 2006, brown worked with social justice organizations in Detroit. In 2006, brown served as a consultant with Detroit Summer, based out of the Boggs Center. From this, brown developed a strong relationship with Grace Lee Boggs, whom she counts as a mentor. Brown was a major figure within the Allied Media Conference as a host and facilitator. Between 2006 and 2010, brown also worked as the executive director of the Ruckus Society. She co-founded and directed the League of Young/Pissed Off Voters. Of her work in Detroit, brown wrote, "Our actions have to be towards the world we want. We need to be guerilla gardening and turning people's heat and water on. We need to be the guerillas putting up solar panels in the hood. That's what Detroit has taught me."

Brown has supported Democratic candidates in presidential elections, encouraging her readers to vote for Joe Biden and Barack Obama. Brown describes her thought as postnationalism. Others have described it as Black feminism or womanism. She has also expressed support for the Black Lives Matter movement. In her book We Will Not Cancel Us, she expresses support for the prison abolition movement.

== Works ==
=== Journalism ===
Brown is currently a contributor to YES!, a magazine focused on solutions journalism. Brown previously contributed to Detroit-based newspaper The Michigan Citizen and was a sex columnist for Bitch magazine.

=== Books and contributions to books ===
Brown has published extensively on sex, healing, self-care, trauma, and science fiction. Much of her work as a writer is based on the writings of science-fiction author Octavia E. Butler. Her own writing style has been said to belong to the Afrofuturism genre.

In 2010, she published the Octavia Butler Strategic Reader with Alexis Pauline Gumbs. In 2013, she received a Detroit Knight Arts Challenge Award to run a series of Octavia Butler-based science fiction writing workshops. In 2015, she collaborated with Walidah Imarisha and Sheree Renee Thomas to edit and release Octavia's Brood: Science Fiction Stories from Social Justice Movements, a collection of 20 short stories and essays about social justice inspired by Butler.

Her first book, Emergent Strategy, which examines sustainable social change, was released in 2017 by AK Press to critical acclaim. Brown defines emergence as "the way complex systems and patterns arise out of a multiplicity of relatively simple interactions" and describes emergent strategy as a "life-code" which is effective both in organizing and personal life.

Emergent Strategy has given way to a series of books published by AK Press on sustainable transformative justice, including the November 2020 release We Will Not Cancel Us And Other Dreams of Transformative Justice and Holding Change: The Way of Emergent Strategy Facilitation and Mediation, released May 2021. The 2020 book We Will Not Cancel Us considers questions of harm, accountability, and transformative justice, speaking primarily to an audience of activists and others organizing around prison abolition.

Brown has contributed to anthologies focused on justice, transformation, and feminism, including How to Get Stupid White Men Out of Office: The Anti-Politics, Un-Boring Guide to Power (2004), Dreaming in Public: Building the Occupy Movement (2012), Dear Sister (2014), and Feminisms in Motion (2018), How We Fight White Supremacy (2019), and Beyond Survival (2020).

In Beyond Survival (2020), brown writes "What Is/Isn't Transformative Justice" (2020), where she asks for transformative justice rather than "public takedowns" of individuals who engage in wrongful behaviour. Brown expresses unease over takedowns occurring online in which persons who commit relatively small harm such as "saying something messed up" or significant harm such as sexual assault are publicly torn to shreds. Brown claims this process cultivates a "fear-based adherence to reductive common values". What is needed instead, she writes, is transformative justice: "justice practices that go all the way to the root of the problem and generate solutions and healing there, such that the conditions that create injustice are transformed". To pivot towards transformative justice, brown offers three solutions.

First, brown asks that we listen to others who have wronged us, using "why?" as a framework. She says that it is gratuitous to categorize such people as "shady, evil, or psychotic". According to her "the percentage of psychopaths in the world is just not high enough to justify the ease with which we assign that condition to others". By asking "why?", brown says that we are humanizing those who have harmed us. By posing this question we may understand that grief, abuse, trauma, mental illness, difference, socialization, childhood, scarcity, and loneliness explain peoples’ actions.

Second, brown proposes that we ask ourselves "what can/we learn from this?" when we have been harmed by others. According to brown, "If the only thing [we] can learn from a situation is that some humans do bad things, it’s a waste of [our] precious time – [we] already know that". Therefore, we must ask ourselves "What can this situation teach me about how to improve our society?". In this respect, brown uses the example of the Bill Cosby sexual assault cases. Had we believed the first woman who came forward and told her story about Cosby, potentially forty other rapes could have been prevented. Thus, brown stresses the need to identify perpetrators of harms, to prevent them from re-offending, and "ensure they experience interventions that transform them".

Third, brown suggests that we ask ourselves "how can my real-time actions contribute to transforming this situation (versus making it worse)?" In real-time, there is space for silence, reflection, growth, and resting, which is absent on social media. Brown suggests trying to get mediation support, thinking of the community, and seeking justice, to address conflict.

Brown's anthology Pleasure Activism: The Politics of Feeling Good was released in February 2019, According to Catherine Lizette Gonzalez, on the news site ColorLines, the book "demonstrates how activists can tap into emotional and erotic desires to organize against oppression". The book appeared in April 2019 on The New York Times Best Seller list for paperback nonfiction, where it reached number six.

==== Fiction ====
In September 2021, brown published the novella Grievers, her first long-form work of fiction. It eventually became a trilogy:

- Grievers (2021)
- Maroons (2023)
- Ancestors (2025)

=== Music ===
On March 25, 2021, brown released an EP titled The Sabbatical Suite. It consists of five songs written on sabbatical in 2020, over beats by her musician friend J-Mythos. She has called it "a small odd intimate music project". She also provided background vocals on the 2023 album Javelin by Sufjan Stevens.

=== Podcasts ===
Alongside her sister Autumn Brown, brown runs the podcast How to Survive the End of the World, which seeks to learn "from the apocalypse with grace, rigor and curiosity" and was in its 5th season as of 2021. In June 2020, brown and Toshi Reagon began hosting the podcast Octavia's Parables, which gives an in-depth dive into Octavia E. Butler's Parable of the Sower and Parable of the Talents. On June 23, 2022, brown appeared on On Being with Krista Tippett on an episode called "We are in a time of new suns".

== Work as a doula ==
Brown also works as a doula. She identifies as a "radical doula", because she sees it as part of her activism.

== Bibliography ==
=== Non-fiction ===
- Emergent Strategy: Shaping Change, Changing Worlds (AK Press, 2017) ISBN 9781849352604
- Holding Change: The Way of Emergent Strategy Facilitation and Mediation (AK Press, 2021) ISBN 9781849354189
- We Will Not Cancel Us And Other Dreams of Transformative Justice (AK Press, 2020) ISBN 9781849354226
- Loving Corrections (AK Press, 2024) ISBN 9781849355544

=== Fiction ===
- Grievers (AK Press, 2021) ISBN 9781849354523
- Maroons (AK Press, 2023) ISBN 9781849354806
- Ancestors (AK Press, 2025) ISBN 9781849355520

=== Edited collections ===
- How to Get Stupid White Men Out of Office: The Anti-Politics, Un-Boring Guide to Power (Soft Skull, 2004) co-edited with William Upski Wimsatt ISBN 9781932360080
- Pleasure Activism: The Politics of Feeling Good (AK Press, 2019) ISBN 9781849353267
- Octavia's Brood: Science Fiction Stories from Social Justice Movements (AK Press, 2015) co-edited with Walidah Imarisha and Sheree Renee Thomas, ISBN 9781849352093
- Octavia Butler Strategic Reader (Allied Media Conference, 2010), co-edited with Alexis Pauline Gumbs

=== Audio ===
- The Sabbatical Suite (2021)
- End of the World Show (2017- current)
- Octavia's Parables (2020- current)

=== Contributions ===
- Dreaming in Public: Building the Occupy Movement (World Changing, 2012) ISBN 9781780260846
- Dear Sister, "awakening" (AK Press, 2014) ISBN 9781481451420
- Joyful Militancy: Building Thriving Resistance in Toxic Times (AK Press, 2017) ISBN 9781849352888
- Feminisms in Motion, "Love Is on Everyone's Lips" (AK Press, 2018) ISBN 9781849353342
- How We Fight White Supremacy (Bold Type Books, 2019) ISBN 9781568588681
- Beyond Survival, "What Is/Isn't Transformative Justice?" (AK Press, 2020) ISBN 9781849353625
- Ursula K. Le Guin A Larger Reality, "A Compilation of Poems, Stories, Essays, Talks and Illustrations by Ursula K. Le Guin" (Winter Texts, 2025) ISBN 9781737370642

== Awards and nominations ==
- Kresge Literary Arts Fellow (2013)
- Knights Arts Challenge winner (2013, 2015)
