= Opioid epidemic =

Deaths due to abuse of opioid drugs

The opioid epidemic, also referred to as the opioid crisis, is the rapid increase in the overuse, misuse or abuse, and overdose deaths attributed either in part or in whole to the class of drugs called opiates or opioids since the 1990s. It includes the significant medical, social, psychological, demographic and economic consequences of the medical, non-medical, and recreational abuse of these medications.

Fentanyl. 2 mg (white powder to the right) is a lethal dose in most people. US penny is 19 mm (0.75 in) wide.

Opioids are a diverse class of moderate to strong painkillers, including oxycodone (commonly sold under the trade names OxyContin and Percocet), hydrocodone (Vicodin, Norco), and fentanyl (Abstral, Actiq, Duragesic, Fentora), which is a very strong painkiller that is synthesized to resemble other opiates such as opium-derived morphine and heroin. The potency and availability of these substances, despite the potential risk of addiction and overdose, have made them popular both as medical treatments and as recreational drugs. Due to the sedative effects of opioids on the respiratory center of the medulla oblongata, opioids in high doses present the potential for respiratory depression and may cause respiratory failure and death.

Opioids are highly effective for treating acute pain, but there is strong debate over whether they are suitable for treating chronic or high impact intractable pain, as the risks may outweigh the benefits.

== North America ==
=== United States ===
From 1999 to 2021 it is estimated 645,000 Americans have died from opioid use. The number of overdose deaths involving opioids in 2021 was ten times what it was in 1999. What the U.S. Surgeon General dubbed "The Opioid Crisis" was theorized to have been caused by the over-prescription of opioids in the 1990s, which led to the CDC Guideline for Prescribing Opioids for Chronic Pain, 2016 and the resulting impact on medical access to prescription opioids "outside of active cancer treatment, palliative and end of life." Opioids initiated for post-surgical pain management have long been debated as one of the causative factors in the opioid crisis, with misuse/abuse estimated at 4.3% of people continuing opioid use after trauma or surgery.

When people continue to use opioids beyond what a doctor prescribes, or when opioids are over-prescribed, whether to minimize pain or induce euphoric feelings, it can mark the beginning stages of an opiate addiction, with a tolerance developing and eventually leading to dependence, when a person relies on the drug to prevent withdrawal symptoms. Writers have pointed to a widespread desire among the public to find a pill for any problem, even if a better solution might be a lifestyle change, such as exercise, improved diet and stress reduction. Opioids are relatively inexpensive, and alternative interventions, such as physical therapy, may not be affordable.

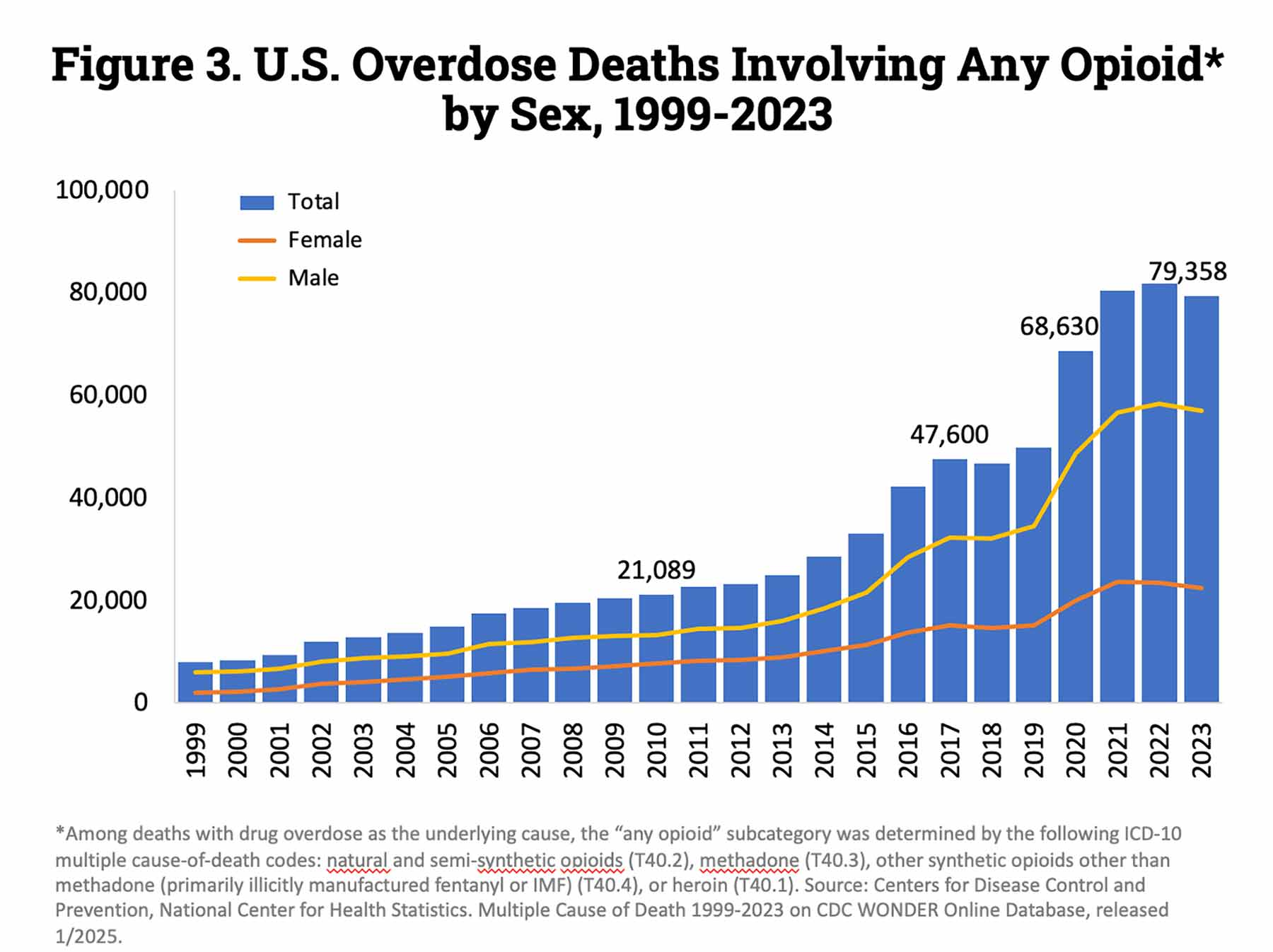
Opioids were involved in 80,411 overdose deaths in 2021, up from around 10,000 in 1999.

In 2017, around 100 million people or a third of the U.S. population was estimated to be affected by chronic pain at any given time. This led to a push by drug companies and the federal government to expand the use of painkilling opioids. In the 1990's, initiatives like the Joint Commission began to push for more attentive physician response to patient pain, referring to pain as the fifth vital sign. This exacerbated the already increasing number of opioids being prescribed by doctors to patients.

Between 1991 and 2011, painkiller prescriptions in the U.S. tripled from 76 million to 219 million per year. In 2016, more than 289 million prescriptions were written for opioid drugs. This was exacerbated by the aggressive and misleading marketing of drug makers, e.g. Purdue Pharma. Purdue trained its sales representatives to convey to doctors that the risk of addiction from OxyContin was "less than one percent."

Mirroring the growth of opioid pain relievers prescribed was an increase in the admissions for substance abuse treatments and opioid-related deaths. This illustrates how legitimate clinical prescriptions of pain relievers were diverted through an illegitimate market, leading to misuse, addiction, and death. With the increase in volume, the potency of opioids also increased. By 2002, one in six drug users were being prescribed drugs more powerful than morphine. By 2012, the ratio had doubled to one in three. The most commonly prescribed opioids have been oxycodone and hydrocodone.

The epidemic has been described as a "uniquely American problem". The structure of the US healthcare system, in which people not qualifying for government programs are required to obtain private insurance, favors prescribing drugs over more expensive therapies. According to Professor Judith Feinberg in 2017, "Most insurance, especially for poor people, won't pay for anything but a pill." Prescription rates for opioids in the US are 40 percent higher than the rate in other developed countries, such as Germany or Canada.

While the rates of opioid prescriptions increased between 2001 and 2010, the prescription of non-opioid pain relievers (aspirin, ibuprofen, etc.) decreased from 38% to 29% of ambulatory visits in the same time period, and there has been no change in the amount of pain reported in the U.S. This has led to differing medical opinions, with some noting that there is little evidence that opioids are effective for chronic pain not caused by cancer. In the years preceding 2024, access to prescription opioids tightened somewhat as safety-related prescribing guidelines were enhanced.

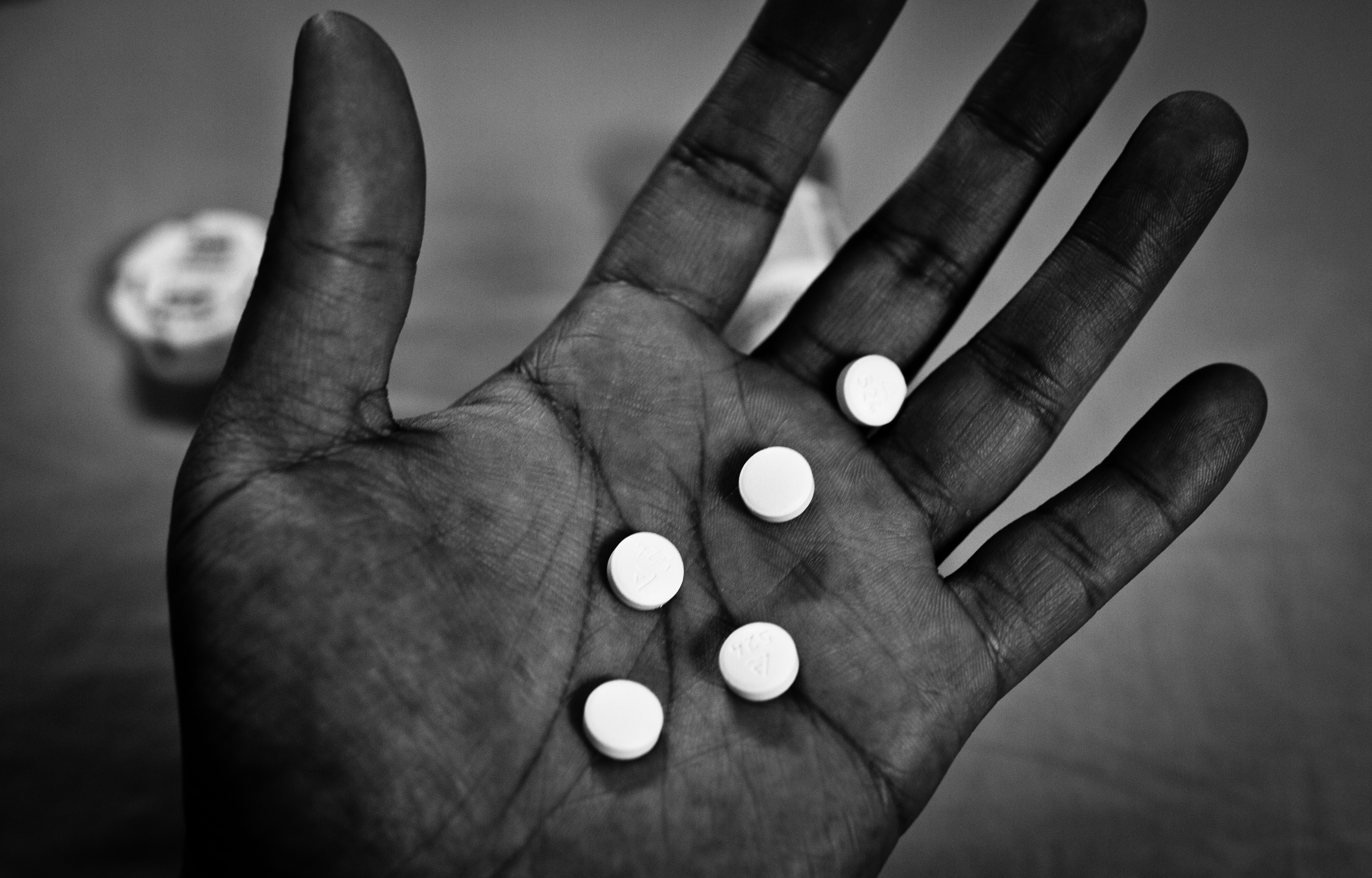
Hydrocodone, one of the most popular opioids

The opioid epidemic affects women and men differently. For instance, women are more likely than men to report recent and non-recent prescription opioid use. Women are also more likely to have chronic pain than men are. In cases of domestic abuse and rape, women are prescribed pain medicine more than men. During pregnancy, women may use prescription opioids to help with pregnancy pain, especially with post-pregnancy pain. The number of women who died from opioid pain relievers increased 5 times from 1999 to 2010. To help stop the spread of opioid abuse in women, it is advised that women are educated on the drugs that they are taking and the possible risk of addiction. Alternatives should always be used when possible in order to prevent addiction.

Most research gone into understanding the epidemic is mostly focused on females, specifically anticipated mothers. Women are at the greatest risk for opioid addiction compared to men. Usually, opioid misuse in women stems from unused prescription drug hoarding, the dependence of the drugs and higher pain levels compared to men. Women are less likely to report opioid misuse in contrast to the male population. Analyzers of the epidemic stress that their main concern is the female victims, and studies tend to neglect the male population, when over 70% of prescription drug intake and overdose, happen to males.

Adolescents can become easily addicted to opioids. Even before their teenage years, children go through the rapid growth of their reward center, the Mesolimbic pathway. The development of the Mesolimbic pathway allows children to be easily satisfied by small rewards to encourage learning, motivation, and acceptable behavior. This growth peaks in their adolescent years, and they start to feel a need for larger, more meaningful rewards, such as psychoactive substances which produce reward signals through direct receptor binding. Teens have an underdeveloped prefrontal cortex which governs impulse control and decision making. The combination of underdeveloped prefrontal cortex and a rundown reward system can lead to adolescents with addictive seeking behaviors and higher susceptibility to the neurological changes developed in substance use disorder (SUD). The Centers for Disease Control and Prevention estimates that In 2018, over 53 million people aged 12 years and older in the United States, reported the misuse of prescription drugs.

A 2020 review of the opioid epidemic in pediatrics stated that there were 4,094 opioid overdose deaths in people ages 14–24 in 2017. Teens commonly use opioids as recreational drugs, instead of what they are supposed to be used for, pain management. Centers for Disease Control and Prevention says that for every opioid death of a teen there are 119 emergency visits and 22 treatment admissions related to opioid abuse. Half a million teenagers in 2014 were reported as non medically prescribed opioid users and a third of those as having a substance use disorder (SUD).

Family is widely discussed as an influence for factors affecting adolescent opioid misuse behavior and in the treatment of adolescent opioid misuse. Family involvement has been shown to be effective in decreasing substance use in adolescents by addressing family risk factors that may be contributing to an adolescent's substance use. Easy accessibility is a risk factor. The late 1990s, increases in opioid recommendations from pharmaceutical companies created an abundance of prescription painkillers in adult households. If family members are taking opioids for pains or have taken them in the past and did not dispose of them correctly or do not protect them properly, it can make it easy for adolescents to get their hands on them.

Proper disposal of these drugs is crucial to reducing adolescent misuse. A national insurance cohort reviewed almost 90,000 opioid prescribed patients, 13–21 years old, and found that 5% continued to fill their prescription 90 days or more after surgery. Medicine take-back programs are the most recommended and regulated disposal method by the United States Drug Enforcement Agency, although, it is not guaranteed that the prescribed patient will comply with this recommendation. There are eight different at-home drug disposal products on the market but none of them is federal agency approved or in the process of being evaluated. The main concern of proper opioid disposal is trash and sewage disposal that create pharmaceutical pollution and still grants access for adolescents with substance use disorders.

Youth are at a heightened risk of developing opioid addictions, and treating youth opioid use disorder is more difficult than it is for older individuals. A systematic review of the epidemiological literature has found that adolescents and young adults consistently have shorter retention times in medication treatments for opioid use disorder than do older adults. This is why it is important for schools to implement effective strategies and programs to teach young children about the dangers and consequences of opioid misuse. Although the retention time of adolescents is much lower than adults, educating them from a younger age on opioid misuse should help keep children away from these drugs.

In 2018, there was a lack of appropriate treatments and treatment centers across the nation. In 2018, big cities like New York City were lacking in treatment services and health offices as well as small rural areas. Another reason the opioid epidemic is hard to combat is due to available housing being limited to recovering addicts. Having limited housing makes it easy for recovering substance users to return to the environments and relationships that promoted drug misuse.

Jobs for recovering addicts can be difficult to find. Individuals with substance use disorders that have criminal records have a more difficult time finding jobs once they leave recovery. Having to combat job insecurity can lead to stress, which can cause someone to relapse. "Wraparound services", or programs that provide services for patients who have just come out of rehabilitation centers or programs, are rare to non-existent, and are a contributing reason as to why the opioid epidemic has gone on for so long.

==== Public policy response ====
The 2019 lawsuit filed by the state of Oklahoma against Purdue Pharma was the first significant step in prompting public action toward ending the opioid epidemic. The state of Oklahoma argued that Purdue Pharma helped start the opioid epidemic because of assertive marketing and deceptive claims on the dangers of addiction. One of the marketing strategies was to redefine "substance use disorder" as "pseudo addiction".

In 2019, Purdue Pharma agreed to settle and pay 270 million dollars to the state of Oklahoma that would go towards addiction research and treatment. The settlement could indicate a win for other states that have taken legal action against similar opioid manufacturers. Specifically, states like California are raising similar claims that Purdue Pharma marketed the drug Oxycontin as a safe and effective treatment, which led to the opioid crisis leaving thousands dead in California from opioid overdoses.

==== Treatment within legal landscape ====
Title II of the Comprehensive Drug Abuse Prevention and Control Act of 1970, otherwise known as the Controlled Substance Act, established five drug schedules to regulate and control their manufacture and distribution. In 2017, President Donald Trump officially declared the opioid crisis a "public health emergency." In 2018, the United States federal government enacted the SUPPORT Act which aims to help Americans gain access to opioid addiction treatment and help and reduce the amount of opioids prescribed.

Other efforts include enacting legislation that provides funds from the Department of Health and Human Services to help support the creation and use of Syringe Services Programs. From 2019, legislatures have started to advocate for the implementation of supervised injection sites as another way to help the opioid crisis and reduce harm. In 2021, the United States Court of Appeals for the Third Circuit held that supervised injection sites violate the Federal Crack House Statute.

==== Safe injection sites ====
Safe injection sites, also known as supervised injection sites are designated facilities where individuals can use pre-obtained drugs under the supervision of trained medical staff. These sites are designed to reduce the health and societal impacts of drug use by providing a controlled, hygienic environment for drug consumption. The primary goal is to prevent overdose deaths through immediate medical intervention and to reduce the transmission of infectious diseases such as HIV and Hepatitis, by offering sterile injection equipment. These sites often provide a range of services, including access to addiction treatment, healthcare, and social support systems, acting as critical points of contact for individuals who might otherwise be disconnected from the healthcare system.

The concept of safe injection sites first emerged in Europe during the 1980s, with Switzerland opening the first such facility in 1986. This initiative was driven by rising heroin use and its associated public health crises. Over time, numerous studies have documented the benefits of these sites, including reductions in overdose deaths, lower rates of disease transmission, and improvements in public safety. These findings have contributed to the gradual adoption of safe injection sites in various countries.

In the United States, the opioid crisis has reached unprecedented levels, prompting a growing interest in harm reduction strategies such as safe injection sites. Despite facing significant legal and political challenges, several cities have taken steps toward implementing these facilities. The initiative has faced considerable opposition and legal hurdles, reflecting the contentious nature of the issue.

In 2021, New York City became the first city in the US to open authorized overdose prevention centers. Other cities, including Seattle and Denver, have explored or implemented similar measures, reflecting a growing recognition of the need for innovative approaches to address the opioid crisis. These initiatives often receive support from public health advocates and some local governments, who argue that safe injection sites are a pragmatic and humane response to a complex public health issue.

In 2023, the U.S. government took a significant step towards evaluating the effectiveness of safe injection sites. It approved funding for a study with a $5 million grant from the National Institute on Drug Abuse to measure the impact of these sites on overdose prevention, health care costs, and community safety. The study, conducted by New York University and Brown University, focused on two sites in New York City and one in Providence, Rhode Island. Researchers enrolled 1,000 adult drug users to assess the sites' effectiveness in reducing overdoses and estimating potential savings for the healthcare and criminal justice systems.

According to medical professionals, supervised injection sites are effective in reducing overdose deaths and the transmission of infectious diseases. These sites have been legally operating in Europe, Canada, and Australia since 1986, and have been associated with significant public health benefits. For example, a 2022 study of a supervised injection site in Vancouver, Canada, found a 26% net reduction in overdose deaths in the area surrounding the site. Despite these benefits, the U.S. Department of Health and Human Services has stopped short of supporting supervised injection sites, and legal challenges have hindered their implementation in many cities .

In 2024, the city of Providence, Rhode Island, approved the state's first safe injection site. This site, set to operate openly, became the only such facility in the U.S. outside of New York City. The approval came more than two years after Rhode Island authorized overdose prevention centers, highlighting the state's commitment to innovative harm reduction strategies. The Providence Center, run by the nonprofit Project Weber/RENEW and VICTA, aims to provide comprehensive services, including drug-related resources, case management, and housing support. This initiative reflects a broader trend of states and cities exploring the potential of safe injection sites to address the opioid crisis, despite facing resistance and legal challenges.

Despite the documented benefits and support from certain quarters, the establishment of safe injection sites in the US remains highly controversial. Opponents argue that these sites may enable drug use and attract crime, while proponents contend that the evidence from other countries demonstrates significant public health benefits.

=== Canada ===
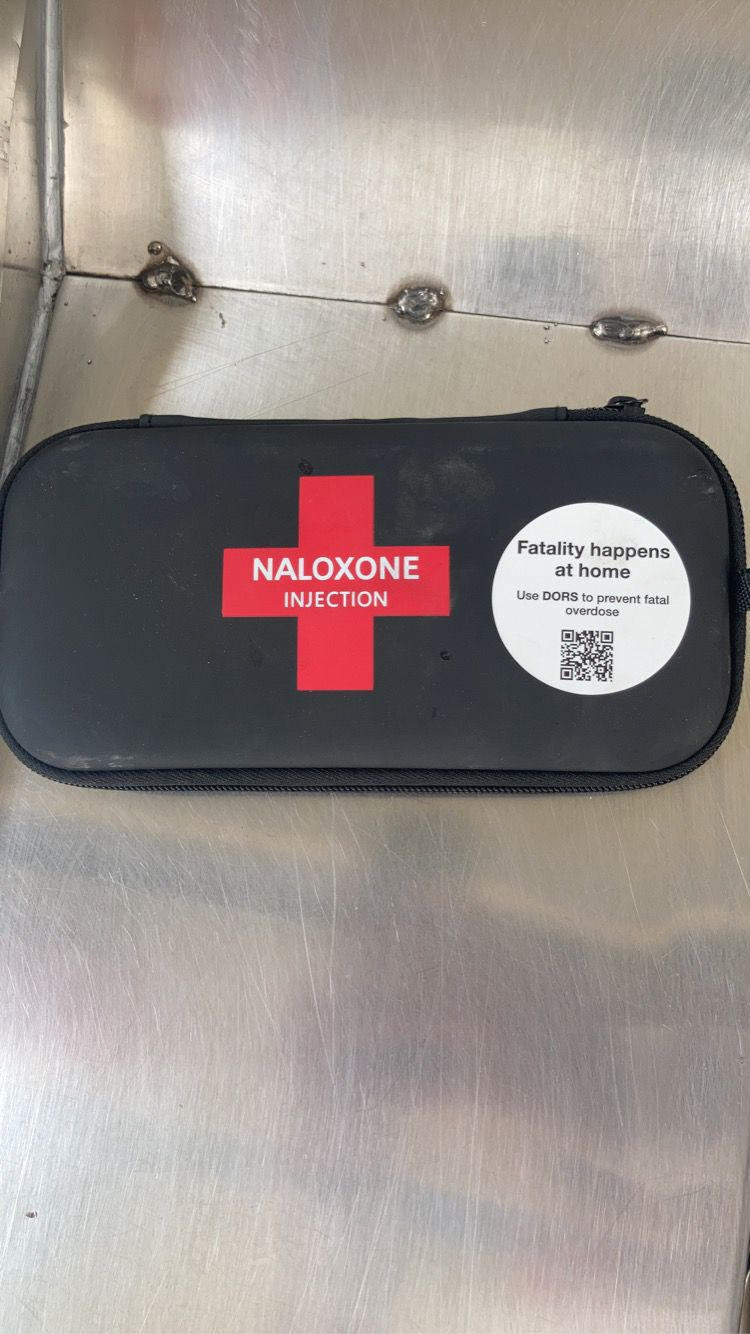
A Naloxone injection kit at a train station in Calgary, Canada

In 1993, an investigation by the chief coroner in British Columbia identified an "inordinately high number" of drug-related deaths, of which there were 330. In 2016, there were 2,861 opioid related deaths in Canada. In 2017, there were 1,473 deaths in British Columbia and 3,996 deaths in Canada as a whole. Between 2016 and 2022 Canada saw a two and a half fold increase in the per capita rate of opioid related deaths, reaching 20.3 per 100,000 population per year, with 1,904 deaths reported in the first 3 months of 2023 alone.

In 2015, Canada was identified as the second-highest per-capita user of prescription opioids, behind the United States. In Alberta, emergency department visits as a result of opiate overdose, attributable to both prescription and illicit opioids, specifically fentanyl and fentanyl analogues, rose 1,000% in the previous five years. The Canadian Institute for Health Information found that while a third of overdoses were intentional overall, among those ages 15–24 nearly half were intentional. In 2017, there were 3,987 opioid-related deaths in Canada, 92% of these deaths being unintentional. The number of deaths involving fentanyl or fentanyl analogues increased by 17% compared to 2016.

Between April and December 2020, there was an 89% increase in opioid related deaths in comparison to 2019. Saskatoon, Saskatchewan experienced a record month in opioid overdoses in May 2020 caused, authorities explained, by a combination of ever-amplifying toxic drugs and the COVID-19 pandemic's quarantine keeping individuals from family and needed mental health services. Over 28,800 Emergency Medical Services (EMS) responded to possible opioid related health crises between January and December 2020 after the COVID-19 pandemic began. In May 2020, Medavie Health Services provided over 250 ambulance services for overdoses, administering the opioid antagonist nasal spray Narcan (naloxone) in record numbers.

North America's first safe injection site, Insite, opened in the Downtown Eastside (DTES) neighborhood of Vancouver in 2003. Safe injection sites are legally sanctioned, medically supervised facilities in which individuals are able to consume illicit recreational drugs, as part of a harm reduction approach towards drug problems, which includes information about drugs and basic health care, counseling, sterile injection equipment, treatment referrals, and access to medical staff, for instance in the event of an overdose. In 2017, Health Canada licensed 16 safe injection sites nationally. In Canada, about half of overdoses resulting in hospitalization were accidental, while a third were deliberate overdoses.

In 2012, OxyContin was removed from the Canadian drug formulary, and medical opioid prescription was reduced. This led to an increase in the illicit supply of stronger and more dangerous opioids such as fentanyl and carfentanil. In 2018, there were around one million users at risk from these toxic opioid products. In 2012 in Vancouver, Jane Buxton of the British Columbia Centre for Disease Control joined the Take-home naloxone program to provide at risk individuals medication that quickly reverses the effects of an overdose from opioids.

== Outside North America ==
In 2023, opioid seizures by authorities in Africa accounted for half of the global seizures of opioids, particularly tramadol. In the 2010s, opioids became a serious problem outside the U.S., mostly among young adults. According to an epidemiologist at Columbia University: "Once pharmaceuticals start targeting other countries and make people feel like opioids are safe, we might see a spike [in opioid abuse]. It worked here. Why wouldn't it work elsewhere?"

Many deaths worldwide from opioids and prescription drugs are from sexually transmitted infections passed through shared needles. This has led to a global initiative of needle exchange programs and research into the varying needle types carrying STIs. Some worry that the epidemic could become a worldwide pandemic if not curtailed. In 2017, prescription drug abuse among teenagers in Canada, Australia, and Europe was comparable to U.S. teenagers.

In 2017, in Lebanon and Saudi Arabia, and in parts of China, surveys found that one in ten students had used prescription painkillers for non-medical purposes. Similar high rates of non-medical use were found among the young throughout Europe, including Spain and the United Kingdom. In 2017, 1,049 people had a death related to opioids in Spain.

While strong opiates are heavily regulated within the European Union, there is a "hidden addiction" with codeine. Codeine, though a mild painkiller, is converted into morphine in the liver. "It's a hidden addiction,' said Dr Michael Bergin of Waterford Institute of Technology, Ireland. 'Codeine abuse affects people with diverse profiles, from children to older people across all social classes."

=== Asia ===
==== Myanmar ====
In May 2020, Myanmar and the U.N. Office of Drugs and Crime (UNODC) announced that, over the previous three months, police had confiscated illicit drugs with a street value estimated at hundreds of millions of dollars. Most was methamphetamine. They also seized 3,750 liters (990 US gallons) of the potent opiate liquid methylfentanyl.

==== Iran ====
In 2022, Iran had the highest rate of nonmedical opium use in the world. Proximity to opiates produced in Afghanistan and Pakistan make Iranian society vulnerable to opiate addiction in the past, however since the Taliban since coming into power in Afghanistan has cracked down on opium poppy cultivation and opioid use, potentially lowering the risk of the neighbouring countries sourcing a supply.

=== Oceania ===
==== Australia ====
In Australia, approximately 60% of drug related deaths are attributed to opioids; a vast majority of which are legal pharmaceuticals such as oxycodone (commonly as Targin ER or Endone) and codeine (Panadeine, Nurofen Plus) rather than illicit heroin or fentanyl. Monash University has claimed that opioids are over-prescribed in Australia, and cited a clinical trial which found that patients with chronic low-back pain or that of the neck experienced a minimal or no difference between oxycodone and placebo in terms of pain management.

Daily in Australia, hospitals receive approximately 150 patients who are experiencing opioid-related health issues, with 3 dying. In 2016-17, 15.4 million prescriptions of opioids were given to 3.1 million Australians; an increase in prescriptions, but generally for lower oral morphine equivalent than in prior years.

Possession of illicit opioids such as heroin and fentanyl, as well as diverted pharmaceutical opioids, is decriminalized in the Australian Capital Territory. Supervised injection sites, pill testing, and opioid-assisted therapy for opioid use disorder are available in varying parts of the country.

=== Europe ===
In 2017, in Europe, prescription opioids accounted for three‐quarter of overdose deaths, which represented 3.5% of total deaths among 15-39-year-olds. While deaths from overdoses related to illicit fentanyl and oxycodone are relatively rare in Europe, fatal outcomes from opioid intoxications have seen a moderate increase since 2015. In continental Europe, the rise of deaths as a result of opioid/opiate use had been partly due to chronic illnesses of addicts 40 years and older, but some of the recent deaths were experienced by younger users experimenting with 'designer drugs'. Generally speaking, the use of fentanyl by addicts in Europe has been rare as of 2022, but at the same time general deaths from opioid use have increased by 177% since 2019. As in other parts of the Western world, the COVID-19 pandemic has brought a reduced availability of therapies for addicts, but at the same time increased the availability of synthetic opioids on the black market.

==== United Kingdom ====
From January to August 2017, there were 60 fatal overdoses of fentanyl in the UK. In England, opioid prescribing in general practice mirrors general geographical health inequalities. In July 2019, two Surrey GPs working for a Farnham-based online pharmacy were suspended by the General Medical Council for prescribing opioids online without appropriate safeguards. Public Health England reported in September 2019 that half the patients using strong painkillers, antidepressants and sleeping tablets had been on them for more than a year, which was generally longer than was "clinically" appropriate and where the risks could outweigh the benefits. They found that problems in the UK were less than in most comparable countries, but there were 4,359 deaths related to drug poisoning, largely opioids, in England and Wales in 2018 – the highest number recorded since 1993.

Public Health England reported in September 2019 that 11.5 million adults in England had been prescribed benzodiazepines, Z-drugs, gabapentinoids, opioids, or antidepressants in the year ending March 2018. Half of these had been prescribed for at least a year. About 540,000 had been prescribed opioids continuously for three years or more. Prescribing of opioids and Z-drugs had decreased, but antidepressants and gabapentinoids had increased, gabapentinoids by 19% between 2015 and 2018 to around 1.5 million.

It was reported that in 2021/2022, 1.80 million patients were prescribed dependency-forming medicines in the most deprived areas in England, 1.66 times more than the number prescribed these medicines in the least deprived areas. This pattern had been consistent since 2015/2016.

==== France ====
A study of prescription opioid use in France over 2004-2017 found that the use of strong prescription opioids more than doubled over the period. There was a large increase in the use of oxycodone for chronic non-cancer pain, by nearly 20-fold. Prescription opioid-related hospitalizations increased from 15 to 40 per 1,000,000 population (+167%, 2000–2017). Heroin and methadone hospitalisations were much lower, increasing from 2.6 to 6.9 per 100,000, with all of the increase due to methadone use rather than heroin. Opioid-related deaths, including drugs of abuse, rose from 1.3 to 3.2 per 1,000,000 population (+146%, 2000–2015).

=== Africa ===
==== West Africa ====
There were 4 million people misusing opioids in Nigeria in 2025, driven by unlicensed, highly addictive opioids illegally exported from India. A 2024 BBC investigation exposed Aveo Pharmaceuticals, a Mumbai-based company, as a key supplier of Tafrodol and similar pills, which contain tapentadol, a potent opioid, and carisoprodol, a highly addictive muscle relaxant banned in Europe. This combination has led to severe addiction, overdoses, and painful withdrawal symptoms.

The rise of these opioids followed tramadol restrictions in Nigeria and India, creating a demand for new alternatives. These combination pills are now cheap and widely available on the streets of Ghana, Nigeria, and Ivory Coast, devastating the lives of millions of young people and prompting local leaders to form vigilante groups to seize and destroy the drugs.

== Accessibility of prescribed opioids ==
The worry surrounding the potential of a worldwide pandemic has affected opioid accessibility in countries around the world. Approximately 25.5 million people per year, including 2.5 million children, die without pain relief worldwide, with many of these cases occurring in low and middle-income countries. The current disparity in accessibility to pain relief in various countries is significant. The U.S. produces or imports 30 times as much pain relief medication as it needs, while low-income countries such as Nigeria receive less than 0.2% of what they need. 90% of all the morphine in the world is used by the world's richest 10%.

America's opioid epidemic has resulted in an "opiophobia" that is stirring conversations among some Western legislators and philanthropists about adopting a "war on drugs rhetoric" to oppose the idea of increasing opioid accessibility in other countries, in fear of starting similar opioid epidemics abroad. The International Narcotics Control Board (INCB), a monitoring agency established by the U.N. to prevent addiction and ensure appropriate opioid availability for medical use, has written model laws limiting opioid accessibility that it encourages countries to enact. Many of these laws more significantly impact low-income countries; for instance, one model law ruled that only doctors could supply opioids, which limited opioid accessibility in poorer countries that had a scarce number of doctors.

In 2018, deputy head of China's National Narcotics Commission Liu Yuejin criticized the U.S. market's role in driving opioid demand.

In 2016, it was reported that while Mexican cartels are the main source of heroin smuggled into the U.S., Chinese suppliers provide both raw fentanyl and the machinery necessary for its production. In 2016 in British Columbia, police discovered a lab making 100,000 fentanyl pills each month, which they were shipping to Calgary, Alberta. 90 people in Calgary overdosed on the drug in 2015. In 2016 in Southern California, a home-operated drug lab with six pill presses was uncovered by federal agents. Each machine was capable of producing thousands of pills an hour.

In 2018, a woman died in London after getting a prescription for tramadol from an online doctor based in Prague who had not considered her medical history. Regulators in the UK admitted that there was nothing they could do to stop this from happening again. A reporter from The Times was able to buy opioids from five online pharmacies in September 2019 without any contact with their GP by filling in an online questionnaire and sending a photocopy of their passport.

== Alternative for opioids ==
Alternative drug options for opioids include over the counter pain medication such as Ibuprofen, Tylenol (acetaminophen/paracetamol), and Aspirin or steroid options. A German study comparing legal opioid use between different countries concluded that a high consumption of oxycodone could be attributed to the non-availability of the drug metamizole, a non-opioid pain reliever which is heavily used in some countries such as Germany and Austria, but which is banned in others such as the US and Canada.

Along with drug alternatives, many other alternatives can provide relief through physical activities. Physical therapy, acupuncture, injections/nerve blocks, massages, and relaxation techniques are physical activities that have been found to help with chronic pain. New pain management drugs like cannabis and cannabinoids have also been found to help treat symptoms of pain. Many treatments like cancer treatments are using these drugs to help manage pain.

An alternative for opioid addiction are opioid receptor agonists or full opioid receptor agonist drugs like methadone, which is also a analgesic and can be used in the treatment of pain in opioid tolerant patients as an extremely safe treatment of choice in hospital settings. Methadone is an opioid, and treatment of pain (over NSAIDs for example) in this form does include opioids; it is, however, an alternative to opioid addiction as a somewhat effective method of eventually reducing opioid use. On the other hand (of methadone, and in opioid addiction treatment), buprenorphine (commonly known as subutex, suboxone) is an easier opioid to taper from, is an alternate opioid with a lower potential for abuse, comes with many contraindications and restrictions.

== Signs of addiction ==
People that are addicted to opioids can have many changes in behavior. Some of the common signs or symptoms of addiction include spending more time alone, losing interest in activities, quickly changing moods, sleeping at odd hours, getting in trouble with the law, and financial hardships. People that notice any of these behaviors in a peer or in oneself, are usually advised to consult a physician.

== Treatment and prevention of addiction ==
Opioid use disorder can be treated in a number of different ways: Medication assisted treatment pathways offer methadone, Suboxone (Buprenorphine/naloxone) and Vivitrol (naltrexone), though naltrexone has poor treatment outcomes due to low patient retention. According to the 2017 Surgeon General's report, medication (buprenorphine/methadone) assisted therapies (MAT's) remain the gold standard in evidence-based care for opiate addiction, with the highest reduction in morbidity, mortality, and general negative outcomes achieved through long term opioid replacement therapy. The report makes recommendations concerning expanding access to MAT in order to combat the opioid epidemic. Social stigma regarding medication-assisted treatment in nations like the USA have been a major barrier in implementing evidence based treatments for opiate addiction.

Cognitive behavioral therapies and counseling are proven effective (though less efficacious on their own than medication assisted therapies) as well as digital care programs to increase abstinence rates.

An emerging area in opioid risk prevention is the use of genetic tests intended to inform prescribing decisions. In 2024, the U.S. Food and Drug Administration (FDA) authorized AvertD, a genetic test designed to identify elevated risk of Opioid use disorder in opioid-naïve adults being considered for short-term opioid prescriptions. The test analyzes a panel of genetic variants associated with addiction risk to generate a probabilistic risk classification intended to support clinical decision-making rather than provide a diagnosis.

Researchers and clinicians have debated the potential role of genetic risk prediction in addiction medicine. Some argue that such tools could help physicians better assess risks when prescribing opioids, particularly in contexts such as post-surgical pain management. Others have raised concerns about the current predictive accuracy of genetic risk scores, the possibility of unequal performance across ancestry groups, and the risk that genetic risk classification could contribute to undertreatment of pain or reinforce stigma surrounding substance use disorders.

=== Anti-opioid advertisements ===
A number of methods for the prevention of opioid addiction have been used and suggested. One method is the creation of anti-opioid advertisements. In the 1990s, advertisements depicting drug-seeking people purposefully slamming their arms into doors and crashing their cars, were unsuccessfully targeted at teens. These ads were unsuccessful because they emphasized the risk of danger, pain, and death caused by opioids. While this tactic would make adults acknowledge the risks and stop using opioids, for many teenagers, the perceived danger adds to the appeal, as smoking becomes a form of rebellion against authoritative adults.

When ads were created that instead channeled teenage rebellion toward resisting the tobacco industry's manipulative tactics, the numbers of teens smoking went down. The makers of these ads feel that since the internet allows teenagers to view gruesome things anyway, it is perfectly acceptable to subject them to images of self-mutilation in order to protect their lives. It is felt that thirty seconds of gruesomeness is a small price to pay for sparing a lifetime (however short) of opioid abuse and its accompanying poverty and crime.

These advertisements, which started in the 1980s, are continuing to play on television today, utilizing donated advertisement time. The goals of the most recent advertisements are to show teenagers that addiction can begin after only five days, and that feeding this addiction can consume a person's entire life.
