= Left Turn =

- January/February 2011 cover of Left Turn
- Editorial collective: Walidah Imarisha; Vasudha Desikan; Tej Nagaraja; Rami El-Amine; Pranjal Tiwari; Morrigan Phillips; Max Uhlenbeck; Jordan Flaherty
- Frequency: Bimonthly
- Founder: Bilal El-Amine
- Founded: 1999
- First issue: April 2001
- Final issue: December 2011
- Country: United States
- Based in: New York City
- Language: English
- Website: leftturn.org

Left Turn was a bimonthly activist news magazine that focused on international social justice movements. Based in New York City and produced by an all volunteer editorial collective, the magazine promoted anti-imperialism and anti-authoritarianism.

Left Turn had its roots in the anti-capitalist wing of the Global Justice Movement and was founded in the wake of the anti-WTO protests in Seattle in 1999 by a small group of socialists.

The magazine's tagline, "Notes from the Global Intifada", was inspired by the then ongoing Palestinian intifada. The magazine supported grassroots activists with the Palestine Solidarity Movement. The magazine ceased print publication after the August 2011 issue, but continues to operate a website.
