= Spill: Scenes of Black Feminist Fugitivity =

First edition (publ. Duke University Press Books)

Spill: Scenes of Black Feminist Fugitivity is a 2017 book of prose and poetry by Alexis Pauline Gumbs. It is a labor of love, and an experimental and poetic work of literary criticism based on the work of Hortense Spillers and the literary archive of freedom-seeking black women. Containing the first syllable of Spillers’ last name, it is an ode to Hortense, the individual, as much as it nurtures–and is nurtured by–black femme folk across vast spatiotemporal locations. The subtitle, "Scenes of Black Feminist Fugitivity" nods to Saidiya Hartman’s Scenes of Subjection: Terror, Slavery, and Self-making in Nineteenth Century America. The work pays homage to not just Saidiya, and not just Hortense, in fact not any singular "I" understood within a Cartesian "Cogito ergo sum" that would subordinate the collective to the individual. "When I turned these phrases, doors opened and everyone came through," Gumbs writes of her engagement with Spillers’ work, "all the black women writers Spillers wrote about and didn’t write about. All the characters those black women writers acknowledged and ignored." Gumbs converses with black study and black womanhood: past, present, and future.

== Interventions ==
By introducing the concept of writing "with" black women as opposed to writing "about" or "to" an audience, Spill is testament to the fact that an academic book can be written whilst citing one black woman directly in the text. This is a key intervention, performance, and achievement. Every in-text citation references Spillers’s Black, White, and in Color: Essays on American Literature and Culture. After Spill’s endnotes, Gumbs lists a bibliography of "Indirect References and Suggested Reading", composed entirely of women of color authors—most of whom are black. If nothing else, the following message is clear: read and cite black women. By engaging Spillers through poetry, an omnitemporal, omnipresent black womanhood emerges on the page.

== Reception ==
Hortense Spillers stated in public conversation: "Nobody else is like Alexis. ...There is really nothing else like this book in my experience as a student, a scholar, a reader, a teacher. The kind of conversation that the text is setting up between poetry and prose, and between a poetic posture and a scholarly posture, I don't think I've ever seen that."

The Los Angeles Review of Books calls it "a 'poetilitical praxis,' an unflinching look at what pain has wrought and what fruit might yet be born."

Spill was nominee in the 29th Lambda Literary Awards, held on June 12, 2017, in the category of LGBTQ Non-Fiction.

The book was also reviewed by Bitch magazine.
