= White feminism =

Form of feminism limited to white women

White feminism is a term which is used to describe expressions of feminism which are perceived as focusing on white women while failing to address the existence of distinct forms of oppression faced by ethnic minority women and women lacking other privileges. Whiteness is crucial in structuring the lived experiences of white women across a variety of contexts. The term has been used to label and criticize theories that are perceived as focusing solely on gender-based inequality. Primarily used as a derogatory label, "white feminism" is typically used to reproach a perceived failure to acknowledge and integrate the intersection of other identity attributes into a broader movement which struggles for equality on more than one front. In white feminism, the oppression of women is analyzed through a single-axis framework, consequently erasing the identity and experiences of ethnic minority women in the space. The term has also been used to refer to feminist theories perceived to focus more specifically on the experience of white, cisgender, heterosexual, able-bodied women, and in which the experiences of women without these characteristics are excluded or marginalized. This criticism has predominantly been leveled against the first waves of feminism which were seen as centered around the empowerment of white middle-class women in Western societies.

While the term white feminism is relatively recent, the critics of the concepts it represents date back to the beginning of the feminist movement, especially in the United States. The label has recently increased in use, as intersectional theory has entered more mainstream national conversations in the US (Note: Intersectional theory, which examines overlapping systems of oppression in society including race, ethnicity, sexuality, gender, and gender identity, was developed by prominent critical race theorist Kimberlé Crenshaw.) since the late 2010s. Others question the label, claiming it is used to attack white feminists, whether or not they are inclusionary of minority women.

== Origins ==
At its origin, feminism in Western societies was represented by white educated women primarily focusing on the right to vote and political representation. An example of this focus is found in Mary Wollstonecraft's text, A Vindication of the Rights of Woman published in 1792, where Wollstonecraft advocates for moral and political equality between men and women, however only addressing members belonging to the middle-class. Similarly, in France, Olympe de Gouges advocated for women's rights in her Declaration of the Rights of Woman and of the Female Citizen as early as 1791. White feminism aligns itself to white supremacy by attempting to hide white women's participation and function in white supremacy by seeing them as victims because of their gender but not holding white women accountable for their part in it when women of color are excluded.

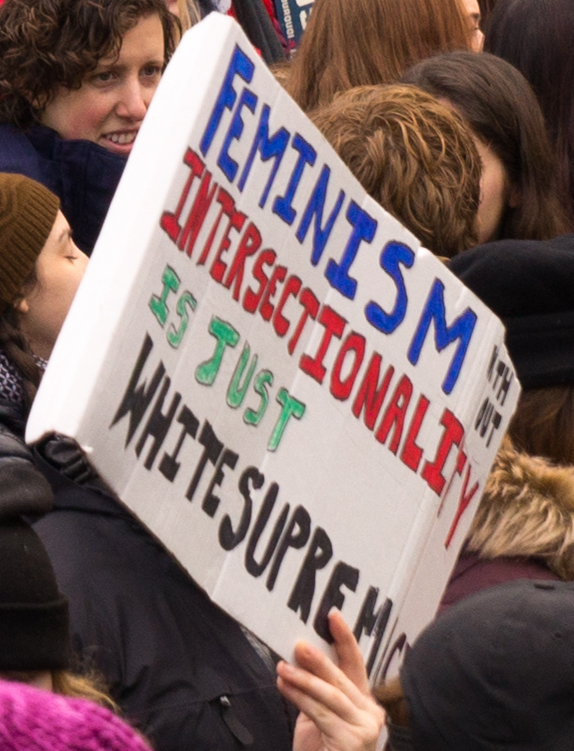
"Feminism without intersectionality is just white supremacy"

== Intersectionality ==
Kimberlé Crenshaw, Columbia scholar and Professor of Law at the University of California, Los Angeles, has championed Black feminism movements and provided the foundational framework for the idea of intersectionality. In Crenshaw's words, intersectionality is "a lens through which you can see where power comes and collides, where it interlocks and intersects". In her 1989 article, "Demarginalizing the intersection of race and sex: a black feminist critique of antidiscrimination doctrine, feminist theory, and antiracist politics", Crenshaw illuminates the compounded nature of Black women's experience of discrimination and injustice. As race and gender intersect, Black women are subjected to racist and misogynistic treatment, simultaneously. This article serves as the foundational literature for implementing a multi-axis framework analysis of race and gender. Crenshaw argues that historically, Black women have been excluded from both the Civil Rights Movement as well as Feminist movements, despite their unique presence in both identities. The intersection of non-white ethnicity and female gender identity compounds the harmful, unjust, discriminatory actions against members of these groups; women of color. Applying a single-axis framework of analysis, Black women in the twentieth century were excluded from social justice campaigns as white women dominantly represented the feminist movements while Black men represented the Civil Rights Movement.

Crenshaw's application of an intersectional lens to analyze the experience of Black women remains relevant and useful in considering the presence of white feminism in activist movements today. Without this lens, women of color are "theoretically erased" from both feminist and antiracist analyses. Intersectionality has been increasingly embraced by feminist movements around the world as a direct challenge to white feminism's shortcomings. According to Bonu Rosenkranz, systems like racism, colonialism, and economic injustice are linked to gender-based violence through movements like Ni Una Menos, feminist strikes, and rallies in places like Asia, the Middle East, and Latin America. In contrast to white feminism's emphasis on gender and individual oppression, these initiatives prioritize the experiences of marginalized women and place a strong emphasis on collective action and structural critique.

According to academics Ashlee Christoffersen and Akwugo Emejulu, many feminist groups, particularly in the UK, have embraced the terminology of intersectionality without making the structural adjustments it calls for. According to their research, intersectionality is frequently applied in an "additive" way, treating characteristics like race, class, and transgender status as distinct things rather than as interconnected oppressive systems. As a result of this strategy, trans women and nonbinary individuals have been excluded from feminist organization, exposing the shortcomings of white feminism's intersectional participation. Christoffersen and Emejulu claim that this type of feminism frequently revolves around a universalized concept of "womanhood" that favors middle-class, cisgender, white, able-bodied women.

== First-wave feminism (1848–1960s) ==
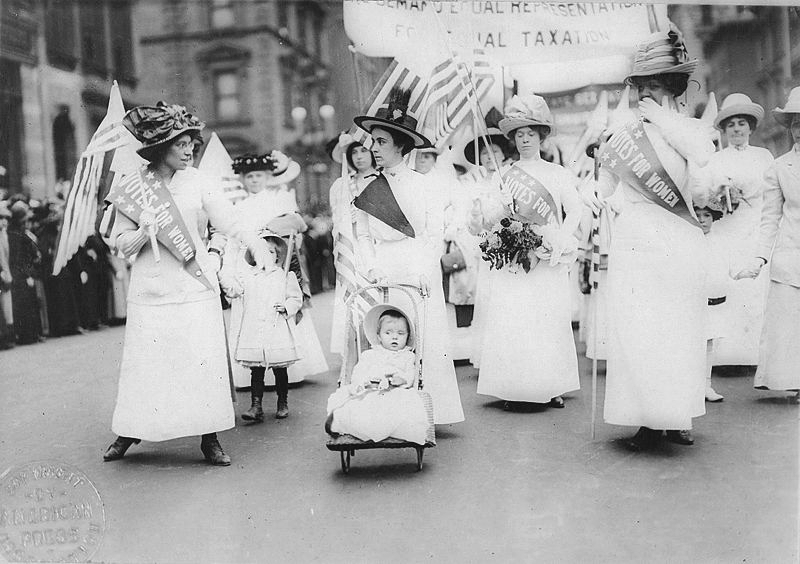
Women's suffrage parade in New York City, May 6, 1912.

The first wave of feminism began in the late nineteenth century, and focused on the equality of political and economic rights. The rights women were fighting for were women's suffrage, access to education, ability to hold political office, equality in the workforce, and legal rights in marriage. This wave officially started with the 1848 Seneca Falls Convention in Seneca Falls, New York, towards the end of the Industrial Revolution. Elizabeth Cady Stanton was one of the main organisers of this convention and went on to oppose the Fifteenth Amendment to the U.S. Constitution. The goal of this wave was to open up opportunities for women, with a focus on suffrage. It was a movement predominantly organized and defined by middle-class, educated white women, and therefore concentrated mostly on issues pertaining to them.

While some women of color were part of the first-wave feminist movement, such as the Indian suffragette Sophia Duleep Singh, on the whole the first suffragist movements remained primarily white; for example, there has been no historical evidence pertaining to the participation of Black British women in UK suffrage movement. In 1893, New Zealand became the first region in the British Empire to grant women of all ethnicities the right to vote; this was met with anger from some suffragists, including Millicent Fawcett, who expressed displeasure that Māori women in New Zealand were able to vote, while women in Britain were not. American suffragettes Susan B. Anthony and Elizabeth Cady Stanton fought for white women to get the right to vote in the United States, which led to white women gaining the right to vote before Black American men had their right to vote protected by the Voting Rights Act of 1965.

Nevertheless, their "History of Woman Suffrage", is a clear example of white feminism as it widely disregards the role of Black women while focusing on white figures of the movement. While 1920 is celebrated as the beginning of women's voting rights in the United States, African American women were still evicted from voting polls in the Jim Crow South. At that time, African Americans were excluded from the feminist movement. In fact, the Black suffragist Mary Church Terrell was denied the help of white activists. Although women of color are not commonly referenced in the feminist literary space, they were still active during the origins of feminism. For example, as early as 1851, Sojourner Truth, a former slave, delivered a speech "Ain't I a Woman" in which she calls for what would be later on described as intersectionality.

== Second-wave feminism (1960s–1980s) ==
Second-wave feminism began in the 1960s and lasted through the 1980s. This time period focused on women in the work environment, owning sexuality, reproductive rights, domestic violence, and rape. Although second-wave feminism was similarly shaped by middle-class, educated white women, it also saw the emergence of women of color into the discussion. In 1973, African American feminists convened at the National Black Feminist Organization, discussing the same issues that the rest of the feminist movement was addressing. Although a separate organization, it gave both white and African American feminists alike a common ground. In this way, the second wave also began to incorporate women of color, whereas the first wave focused mostly on white, cisgender, middle-class women.

The Second Sex by Simone de Beauvoir, stands as one of the most striking examples of the essentialization of women in the figure of the white bourgeoise mother and hence disregard for other forms of oppression such as race or sexuality. Nevertheless, this book has appeared as a landmark which has enabled other more complex theories to emerge. During the second and third-wave feminist periods, women of color emerged into the feminist literary space, arguing that feminist movements were essentializing the experiences of women. Among such feminists were bell hooks. bell hooks is recognized for writing about the struggles that Black women experienced as well as emphasizing that the feminist movement was exclusionary towards those women by virtue of its inattention to the interactions between race, gender, and class. hooks argued that white women should recognize the fact that they, like ethnic minority men, occupied a position of being both oppressed while also being oppressors. In an attempt to shun the critiques addressed by scholars from minorities exposing second-wave feminism, the latter sought to divert attention by exposing the exclusionary practices of second-wave feminism. This has been criticized by many scholars which have labeled it under several names such as missionary, imperialist, or western feminism.

== Third-wave feminism (1990s–2010) ==
Led by Generation X, third-wave feminism began in the 1990s when issues surrounding sexuality, such as pornography were brought to the forefront. One of the reasons for the split in the second wave was due to differences regarding how women should embrace their sexuality, leading to different views on sex work and pornography. Third-wave feminists coined the term "riot grrls" which represented strong, independent and passionate feminists in this time period. "Grrls" were typically described as angry feminists fighting against sexism. The third wave was inspired by the post-modern society, in which women worked to reclaim their own power over derogatory words men have used to shame them, like 'whore' and 'slut'. The third wave was also created in order to address social issues the current generation was facing. This also worked to advocate for women's sexual liberation and expression of gender identity. This wave also included even more women of color and women from different classes than previous waves. When comparing the second and third wave, the third wave highlighted intersectionality.

== 21st century intersectional feminism, or fourth-wave (2010–present) ==
During third-wave feminism and at the start of fourth-wave feminism after 2010, feminists sometimes emphasize intersectional perspectives in their work. Despite this, some have argued that feminist media continues to overrepresent the struggles of straight, cisgender, able-bodied, middle class, white women. Nevertheless, in recent years, authors like Kimberlé Crenshaw have developed the theory of intersectionality, a clear opposition to white feminism. Rather than analyzing society from a unique perspective of race or gender, she calls for a more complex analysis of systems of oppression using multiple and overlapping lenses such as race, gender, sexuality, etc.

An example of a view of feminism that claims that women's issues can be separated from issues of class, race, and ability in present-day can be seen in the work of Emily Shire, politics editor at Bustle and an op-ed contributor for The New York Times. Shire argues that feminism excludes some women who do not share political viewpoints when it takes positions on Israel and Palestine, efforts to raise the minimum wage, and efforts to block the construction of oil pipelines. Shire's position contrasts with intersectional feminist activists who view pay equity, social justice, and international human rights as essential and inseparable commitments of feminism, as articulated in the Day Without a Woman platform that "[recognizes] the enormous value that women of all backgrounds add to our socio-economic system – while receiving lower wages and experiencing greater inequities, vulnerability to discrimination, sexual harassment, and job insecurity". While Shire advocates for a feminism that achieves inclusivity by avoiding political positions so as to not alienate women who disagree with those positions, organizers of the Women's March hold the principle that "women have intersecting identities" necessitating a movement that focuses on a "comprehensive agenda".

This notion of detaching feminism from broader political or structural concerns is precisely what Serene Khader critiques in her book Faux Feminism, where she questions the limitations of a feminism centered on individualism rather than systemic change. Khader challenges white feminism's emphasis on individual empowerment by presenting the Individualism Myth, which holds that feminist advancement is determined by the degree of freedom enjoyed by individual women. She contends that this approach perpetuates a model in which wealthy women rise by depending on the underappreciated labor of less privileged women, frequently women of color, while ignoring structural inequity. White feminism can conceal the ways in which institutions and men contribute to gender inequality by emphasizing individual choice over structural change. It also ignores the ways in which capitalism and patriarchy collectively influence women's lives.

Another example of controversy stems from the beliefs of some feminists that the Islamic practices of women wearing hijabs, burqas, and niqābs are oppressive towards women. This has been labeled white feminism. Many Muslim women have spoken out in defense of their religious dress practices. One example of this belief was seen in the Islamic scarf controversy in France where it was argued by many French feminists that the Islamic veil threatens women's autonomy, while many Muslim women say that it is a choice and that denying the choice only restricts a woman's freedom. They say that some wear it as a personal commitment; others reject the notion that the veil is a religious sign. Some Muslim women see the burqa as freeing, because it enables them to be in the public sphere while still observing moral and religious requirements.

In her article, "Do Muslim Women Really Need Saving?" Lila Abu-Lughod states that Muslims find comfort through their burqas, as they provide "mobile homes." The widespread white feminist belief that Muslim women must be "saved" from their religious or cultural customs is contested by Abu-Lughod. She contends that this perspective, which treats Western ideas of emancipation as universal, is an example of cultural imperialism. Veils can represent faith, identity, or individual freedom rather than oppression for many Muslim women. Abu-Lughod advocates for acknowledging these women's agency and paying attention to how they personally define freedom instead of presenting them as passive. Instead of enforcing a single ideal, she advocates for feminism that values cultural diversity.

Trans-exclusionary radical feminism has also been a topic of discussion. Feminism requires fighting for women's rights, but trans-exclusionary radical feminists do not see trans women as women. Many of them argue against trans women changing their sex on legal documents, say that lesbian as an identity is disappearing, that trans men are not men, and that gay children need protection when they think they are transgender. Critics, especially within the LGBT community, have expressed their discontent with these arguments. They feel that privileged white women who make these arguments will make trans women, especially trans women of color, more at risk for discrimination and that they fail to consider many other factors that trans women have to deal with.

Furthermore, critics note that lesbian women are also excluded from feminist movements, alongside masculine-representing women. What has also been a topic of discussion is that hijabis are often forced to wear hijabs. This perspective shifts the focus to the systemic oppression and these women being the victims, rather than being a part of the oppression.

== See also ==
- Tapada limeña
- Feminism and racism
- Feminism
- Femonationalism
- Homonationalism
- Multiracial feminism
- Intersectionality
