= The Revival: Women and the Word =

- Directed by: Sekiya Dorsett
- Produced by: Jade Foster and Andrea Boston
- Cinematography: Charla Harlow and Alexis Casson
- Edited by: Patrick Flynn
- Release date: July 15, 2016 (Outfest Film Festival)
- Running time: 82 minutes
- Country: United States

The Revival Women and the Word is a 2016 documentary film directed by Sekiya Dorsett, a queer filmmaker who works to give voice to issues of equality. This documentary chronicles a US tour group of black lesbian poets and musicians who are traveling performing making history as queer women of color. Their journey is to bring together their community and include interviews from leading black feminist and queer thinkers including Alexis Pauline Gumbs, Nikky Finney, and Alexis De Veaux. This documentary tackles themes such as gender, race, and sexuality. This film works to represent community and provide a special insight to the experience of queer women of color performers. Additionally, this film works to empower and raise the voices of the marginalized.

== Background ==
Four years ago in 2012, 50 friends mostly queer and black identified gathered in a small living room in Washington, D.C. for a poetry event called The Revival. The host, a queer black woman, Jade Foster, dreamed of building a safe space where queer women and allies could celebrate being black, women, and carriers of the word. The word short for the creating of poetry. That same year in 2012, the event evolved into a nine-day tour that went to eight cities. The project was powerful and touched thousands of lives, and connected five exceptional women who are all performers. The documentary is the story of how that dream of Jade Foster came to be and came into fruition.

== Synopsis ==
The documentary tells the story of how poet Jade Foster recruited a group of five dynamic poets and musicians to become a part of a movement that builds community among queer women of color, upholds literary arts excellence, and occupies living rooms across the country. The film follows Foster, Be Steadwell, Jonquille Rice, T'ai Freedom Ford and Eli Turner on a road trip as part of the Revival tour, wherein these queer black poets perform their work in various cities across the country. The movie starts in Brooklyn, before the first performance of what is dubbed the Revival tour. Within the film it takes you on a journey of their personal narratives while interweaving black feminist thinkers. Foster delivers powerful poetry throughout the film that speaks of both her own identity and her community. Ford brings up her mother's history of addiction within the film. Some of the black feminist thinkers include author Alexis De Veaux, tells of the period of time in the mid-1970s when she offered a space for poetry in her own Brooklyn living room. Her personal narrative tells of the struggle black queer women performing poetry had attempting to navigate their identity and create safe spaces. The film does not shy away from the police brutality happening within the US by including black feminist poet Nikki Finney who plays a huge role in connecting the historical oppression of black people in the past to the current oppression black bodies currently face within the US. Additionally, the film brings up the harm done to black queer bodies and they present their stories as a way to challenge this oppression of black queer bodies. One of the most important aspects of this movie is how it presents the identity of these queer black women as one whole thing. Not three, separated by gender, race and sexuality. This is the very definition of intersectionality. They show the lives of these five women to provide context of the experience of black queer women poets, musicians, authors, thinkers, feminists, activists, educators, and performers across the country.

== Cast ==
- Jade Foster
- Be Steadwell
- Jonquille Rice
- T'ai Freedom Ford
- Elizah Turner

Other featured feminist voices include activist Farah Tanis, writer Alexis De Veaux, writer Alexis Pauline Gumbs, and poet Nikky Finney.

== Awards and reception ==
This film is a documentary that takes on the necessary task to bring marginalized voices and experiences from the periphery to the center. The documentaries main goal is to empower communities around the U.S. whilst telling their own stories. For those reasons the film has been recognized by multiple film festivals including: Frameline Film Festival, Outfest Los Angeles LGBT Film Festival, NewFest New York LGBT Film Festival, Urbanworld Film Festival, and Twist: Seattle Queer Film Festival.
