= Feminism and racism =

Women bases intertwined concepts

Feminism and racism are highly intertwined concepts in intersectional theory, focusing on the ways in which women of color in the Western World experience both sexism and racism.

According to the Western feminist movement, which seeks to end gender oppression, women of color have experienced racism both within and outside of feminist movements and have also experienced sexism within various anti-racism and civil rights movements. For instance in the United States racism and sexism have affected female activists of Black, Hispanic, Native American, and Asian descent in different ways, highlighting the need for a political movement that is aware of the intersection of race and gender oppression.

These experiences of racism and sexism have prevented women of color from fully partaking in such movements, but they have also led to the creation of unique forms of feminism, such as Black feminist theory and multiracial feminism, that actively work against both gender and race oppression. Similarly, transnational feminism seeks to address women's rights outside of the Western world and looks to address issues like racism, oppressive gender roles, and femicide that impact women globally.

== Intersectionality ==
Intersectionality posits that identities are combined in a way that prevents any instance of oppression from being pinned on any individual identity one holds. It is argued that the combined societal effect of one's identity is greater than the sum of the individual effects. For example, because Black women and other women of color are marginalized by both race and gender, they are "two steps removed from [the] white male norm". Therefore, this marginalization is greater than racism and sexism individually. Importantly, women of color are well aware of experiencing multiple forms of marginalization, while white women and men of color may be less aware, depending on their own identities.

Another perspective is that of multiple jeopardy, which states that women of color, specifically Black women, are at risk for multiple forms of oppression, including race, gender, and class. Originally viewed as a "double jeopardy" focused on race and gender oppression, the concept of multiple jeopardies suggests that oppression is multiplicative rather than additive, stating that different forms of oppression can vary in significance depending on the context. For example, within the feminist movement, women of color may simultaneously prioritize race, as it distinguishes them and exposes them to greater risk of racial discrimination, as well as gender.

== Racism in the Feminist Movement in the United States ==
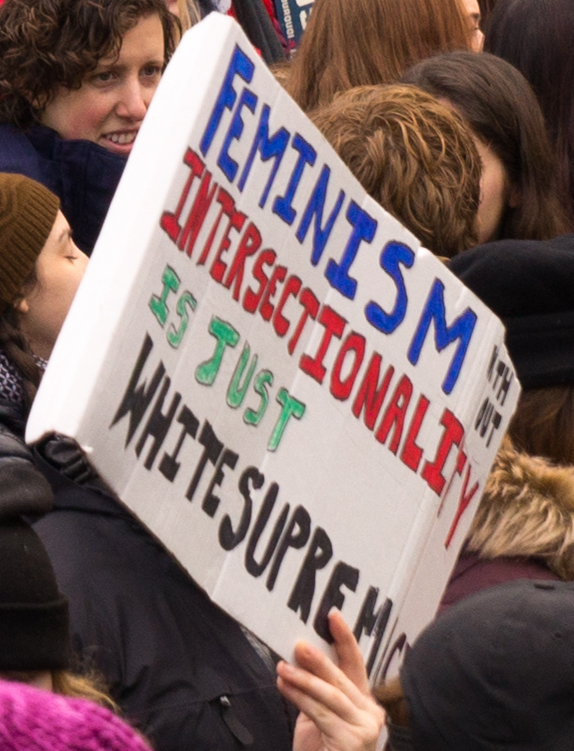
Protest Sign demonstrating the importance of intersectionality in the feminist movement

Because women of color are often marginalized by both their race and gender, they may be excluded from or treated differently within feminist and anti-racist movements. Mainstream feminist theory (in the United States and other developed nations) was conceived from the perspectives of white women who often failed to consider the needs of women of color and tended to overgeneralize their platforms to speak for "all" women.

While the entire feminist movement is based on an idea of "sisterhood," this notion was often restricted to white, middle-class women, many of whom did not expand their focus outside of their own socio-political needs. Therefore, race was rarely considered to be a pressing topic in the mainstream movement. This exclusionary tendency is sometimes referred to as "white feminism"; which may be defined as advocacy for equal rights on behalf of white women without consideration for the wants and needs of women of color.

According to Kimberle Crenshaw of the Stanford Law Review, feminism and anti-racist ideals rarely interact within their respective movements. Thus, these movements often create an "either/or" standard when it comes to one's identity (either, for example, a person of color or a woman) they may neglect to account for the unique issues and experiences faced by women of color.

For example, Women's suffrage movement leaders Susan B. Anthony and Elizabeth Cady Stanton worked with Frederick Douglass and other activists in the American Equal Rights Association (AERA) in 1866 in an effort to win rights for both women and African Americans, but this organization was still viewed as exclusionary to Black women due to its separate treatment of race and gender. The organization dissolved within three years of being founded due to "heated arguments" over the 15th Amendment, which gave Black men the right to vote. Many white suffragettes, particularly in the Southern U.S., harboured resentment against Black Americans, specifically men, after the 15th Amendment was passed. Despite the fact that leading suffragettes initially fought for equal rights alongside Black male activists in AERA, the resentment among white suffragettes led to renewed racism in the women's suffrage movement.

By dismissing the needs and experiences of women of color, the mainstream feminist movement also denies specific forms of resistance that operate within the specific constraints present in the social location of being a woman of color. Therefore, the marginalization of women of color cannot be assumed to be covered by the feminist and anti-racist movements, even when the two are combined.

=== Black women ===
When feminist theory was still in its formative stages, white theorists frequently compared gender oppression to the enslavement of Black individuals in order to mobilize (primarily white) women.^{: 44} At this time, abolitionist movements were already formed and active, and early white feminists used this existing work as a blueprint for their own movement.^{: 44} Specifically, slavery was used as a comparison to highlight the ways in which white men felt entitled to women's work. For example, Simone de Beauvoir's influential work The Second Sex (1948), insinuates that the autonomy and power of women was more systematically oppressed than that of slaves. While this comparison helped to start the feminist movement, it ultimately diminishes the complexities of racial oppression (such as the fact that slaves were considered to be non-human) and implies that white women were exempt from their own perpetration of racism despite their role in perpetuating slavery. However, not all white feminists disregarded race from their own perceptions of feminism, and many became involved with the abolitionist movements of the time.^{: 44}

Given that race-based movements required solidarity across gender lines, it was difficult for many white feminists who saw all men as their oppressors to support mixed-gender abolitionist movements which led to the belief that Black women were not "true" feminists. Similarly, Latina women have historically participated in various mixed-gender political organizations that focus on issues specific to them (such as immigration and worker's rights) and were also faced with backlash for working alongside men. By acting as though Black and Latina women's work in mixed-gender movements were separate from feminism because they were associated with men as well as women, the white feminists who shared these beliefs suggested that experiences of sexism were more important than experiences of racism, a mindset that has persisted throughout time.

During the first wave of demands for suffrage, white women worked together with Black men and women with the goal of securing a universal right to vote. However, when it became clear that the right to vote would only be given on the basis of either race or gender (i.e., only to white women or only to Black men), white women began to use racist tactics to argue against Black men's suffrage.^{: 59} This highlights the idea that, while white women have historically based their movement on gaining equality for "all" women, they have continually forgotten Black women, who sit at the intersection of both race and gender oppression. The assumption that white women speak for all women and therefore experience all forms of gender oppression ignores the diversity of experiences from those who are less privileged, specifically by neglecting to consider how gender oppression occurs among women of color.

For example, see some of the reactionary movements regarding birth control and abortion, often championed by white women. These movements ignore the fact that women of color have been denied the right to have children at will, thanks to factors such as forced sterilizations and welfare policies. In a similar fashion, calls for perpetrators of gendered violence to be held accountable have historically focused on white women's experiences of violence, with less attention paid to women of color's perpetrators, especially when such violence comes from white men. Therefore, because the goals of the mainstream feminist movement often refuse to acknowledge the history of racism, including its own participation in race-based oppression, women of color are less likely to feel wholly accepted by the movement.

Additional avenues through which mainstream feminism has perpetuated racism include class-based movements and ethnocentrism. Class-based movements, such as for socialism or communism, are theoretically designed to reach across both race and gender divisions. Still, such movements have primarily been run by white, middle-class men and women. However, these movements have historically rejected participation from Black women by, for instance, denying them membership to various unions. For example, when white women campaigned to take a greater part in the paid labor force, their advocacy was facilitated by the underpaid labor of women of color who were able to take care of household duties while white women began working. Furthermore, the Western feminist viewpoint has often argued in support of the imperialism of developing nations to expand the reach of "modern" feminism. However, this mindset ignores differences between cultures and how feminist movements vary within specific settings. By considering Western feminism to be the universal ideal, the work of women of color, which seeks a form of gender equality that is culturally competent, is erased.

=== Asian American women ===
Asian American women have been politically active since the civil rights and feminist movements in the 1960s. However, they have often had a limited presence due to the small numbers and significant diversity among them. This has made it difficult to have a single collective force representing Asian American women with the same shared issues. As a result, most feminist groups specific to Asian American women began at the grassroots level, outside of the predominantly white feminist movement. This has contributed to the perception that, for various reasons, Asian American women have had a minimal level of participation in the feminist movement.. Another significant factor contributing to low participation rates are the stereotypes surrounding Asian American women, which fail to account for their diverse cultural values and paint them as submissive and passive. Similar to the issues surrounding Black women in the feminist movement, Asian American women face issues specific to their own racial and gender identities which are often ignored because the mainstream feminist movement is so heavily based on American/Western culture. For these reasons, Asian American immigrant women may find it difficult to take part in American feminism, especially if English is not their first language. Therefore, a large majority of Asian American feminists work within smaller, Asian American-focused organizations, in which there is a shared element of ethnicity alongside gender.

=== Native American women ===
Similar to Black and Asian American women, Native American women have a unique set of challenges that are often unacknowledged by the mainstream feminist movement. Native American groups are primarily focused on issues surrounding land use and colonialism, but the presence of sexism has consistently been an issue for women activists as well. Native American sovereignty is seen as being central to gender equality, as colonization played a major role in bringing European gender differentials into Native American tribes. In this sense, even while primarily fighting for decolonization, Native American women are also fighting against gender oppression, especially in the form of white European gender roles. Indeed, fighting sexism has always been a focus for Native American women, regardless of whether or not they identify as feminists. However, because the feminist movement in the United States advocates for reforming the current social system rather than abolishing it, Native American women who are firmly anti-colonial have a difficult time identifying as part of the mainstream movement, although Native American feminists do exist.

=== Individual cases ===
In France, there is a femonationalist music band named Les Brigandes. This group wrote a song claiming that the French government failed to protect white Frenchwomen from being sexually assaulted by darker skinned male immigrants, from countries where gender equality did not exist.

== Feminism and the United States Anti-Racism Movement ==
In Antebellum and Postbellum American feminism, which was very much influenced by the Enlightenment and contemporary politics, there was a growing sentiment that women, as well as enslaved people, deserved the same inalienable Enlightenment rights as men of that period. Moreover, in its early days, feminism was very closely associated with abolitionism, as many feminists used tactics favored by abolitionists and temperance advocates, including petitions and political newspapers (such as Amelia Bloomer's Lily 1849–1856 and Pauline Wright Davis's Una 1853–1854). Many feminists also participated in meetings of The American Anti-Slavery Society (1833) and formed their own women-run abolitionist organizations such as the Philadelphia Female Anti-Slavery Society and the National Female Anti-Slavery Society in 1837.

Anti-racism movements, from abolition to modern civil rights, have been politically active for longer than the gender equality movement that would become modern-day feminism. For example, during the abolitionist movement, Black women were crucial in fighting for the womanhood that was denied to them as enslaved individuals. Given that such movements arose before feminism, Black women in particular had already participated in various forms of activism for much longer, they were better equipped to create their own more advanced activist roles than they were generally allowed to hold in the (white) movements for gender equality. During the civil rights movement, vital duties included mobilizing followers and raising money, both of which were often done on a community level by Black women of various backgrounds. However, the work of Black women leaders in the civil rights movement has consistently been forgotten or ignored, especially compared to men who held traditional beliefs regarding gender roles. While male leaders often received a majority of media attention, the critically important work of Black women usually remained in the background.

Of the few Black women who were able to work their way into leadership positions in organizations led by white people, widespread racism made open involvement even more precarious, since Black women were often denied union membership and were at a higher risk of being fired due to racial and/or gender discrimination. Furthermore, losing a job due to political involvement was riskier for Black women, since employers were less likely to hire them in the first place.

== Transnational feminism ==
Transnational feminism is a feminist theory developed in response to Western Feminism, to explain and address women's rights concerns such as racism, sexism, and class inequality on a worldwide scale. Furthermore, transnational feminism tries to investigate how overlapping identities, such as race and country, combine to generate specific women's rights challenges for women living outside of the Western world.

== Potential solutions ==
Two main problems regarding coalition building between the feminist and anti-racism movements are differing ideological beliefs and goals, as well as the unequal power relations between groups (which often place women of color at the bottom of the power hierarchy). In addition, Black feminism must work to be palatable to white feminism to access shared resources, meaning that experiences that are wholly unique to the Black community are ignored, due to unequal power relations. Despite this, these challenges do not completely prevent coalition work. While shared oppression alone is not enough to ensure solidarity, women of color and other activists have individually continued to put in the work needed to promote a movement that promotes both gender and racial equality. Women of color have come together in response to racism from the mainstream feminist movement, by both emphasizing a shared difference from white women and acknowledging the differences within their own experiences. Recognizing how the experiences and history of white women have been prioritized within the feminist movement is crucial to highlighting the need for continued activism and coalition building.

Women of color have historically been the primary voices advocating for a racial perspective in the feminist movement, and a gendered perspective in the anti-racism movement, as those with privileged identities did not consider reaching out into the margins. Since they understand the need to fight for multiple avenues of equality at the same time, those with multiple marginalized identities are more suited for this coalition work. The shared identity required for a racially inclusive feminist movement is shaped by recognizing how gender and race oppression are similar, and shaped by shared dominant groups, even if the individual identities of members do not exactly match. In addition, having a global perspective of social issues and shared oppression is useful moving forward, given how intertwined various forms of oppression are. Organizations specific to women of color were not formed as a reaction to the predominantly white second-wave feminist movement but grew alongside it. During second-wave feminism, mainstream national organizations, such as the National Organization for Women would actively resist incorporating the needs of women of color into their movement. From this, white feminists are seen as the "normal" feminists, while the feminism engaged in by women of color is considered to be a separate form or subset. Pushed aside by popular movements, women of color often resorted to making their own branches or unique organizations to openly work towards both gender and racial equality.

Reacting to the racism prevalent in the mainstream feminist movement and the sexism in anti-racism movements, Black women have proposed their own feminist ideology. This framework aims to make Black women and their experiences visible, create their own goals for the movement, challenge intersecting oppressions (specifically, racism, sexism, and classism), and highlight the strengths of being a Black woman. Black lesbian women were crucial in writing about Black feminist theory, as many activists within this group were critically examining the links between race, class, gender, and sexual oppression. In 1973, the National Black Feminist Organization was formed, but there was never a large movement following the first convention due to limited resources among the Black women who had the time and money to organize, especially compared to the predominantly white National Organization of Women. Womanist has also been proposed as an alternative to Black feminism. The usage of this term began in the 1980s, and although it is not very widespread, it was designed to allow more freedom of expression for feminists of color and highlight the unique history of Black women. womanism exists in contrast to (white) feminism, under the assumption that the mainstream feminist movement will continue to uphold white supremacy, and unlike typical feminism, womanism acknowledges the need to support Black men and lesbians to achieve equality on multiple fronts. In comparison, Black feminism considers how "traditional" feminist issues (e.g., political rights, reproductive justice) impact Black women specifically, calling out the implicit whiteness of the mainstream feminist movement.

A third proposed solution is multiracial feminism. Multiracial feminism was formed directly by women of color, in response to the need for an analysis of gender dynamics that considers race and the intersection of these identities. This movement acknowledges important identity-based differences that shape unique experiences, while still highlighting the universal experiences of women, and is prominent among Black, Latina, Asian American, and Native American feminists. Key features of multiracial feminism include recognizing the intersection of gender, race, and class; noting the power hierarchies present in such social identities, and how an individual can be both oppressed and privileged (e.g., white women are oppressed via gender, but privileged via race); and acknowledging the various forms of agency present given different social and resource constraints. In the early 1980s, multiracial feminism began to peak as the general second-wave feminist movement began to slow down, and many of the mainstream feminists began to join the anti-racism movement and acknowledge the relationship between race and gender. With the addition of white women into multiracial feminism, the movement needed to call for white women to learn and listen about women of color's lived experiences, and to recognize that women of color are not a homogeneous group.

== See also ==
- Feminism of the 99%
- Femonationalism
- Homonationalism
- Intersectionality
- Multiracial feminist theory
- Misogynoir
- Second wave feminism
- White feminism
- Asian feminist theology
