= Methylfentanyl =

Methylfentanyl may refer to:

- 3-Methylfentanyl
- α-Methylfentanyl
- β-Methylfentanyl
