= Walidah Imarisha =

American writer, activist, and educator

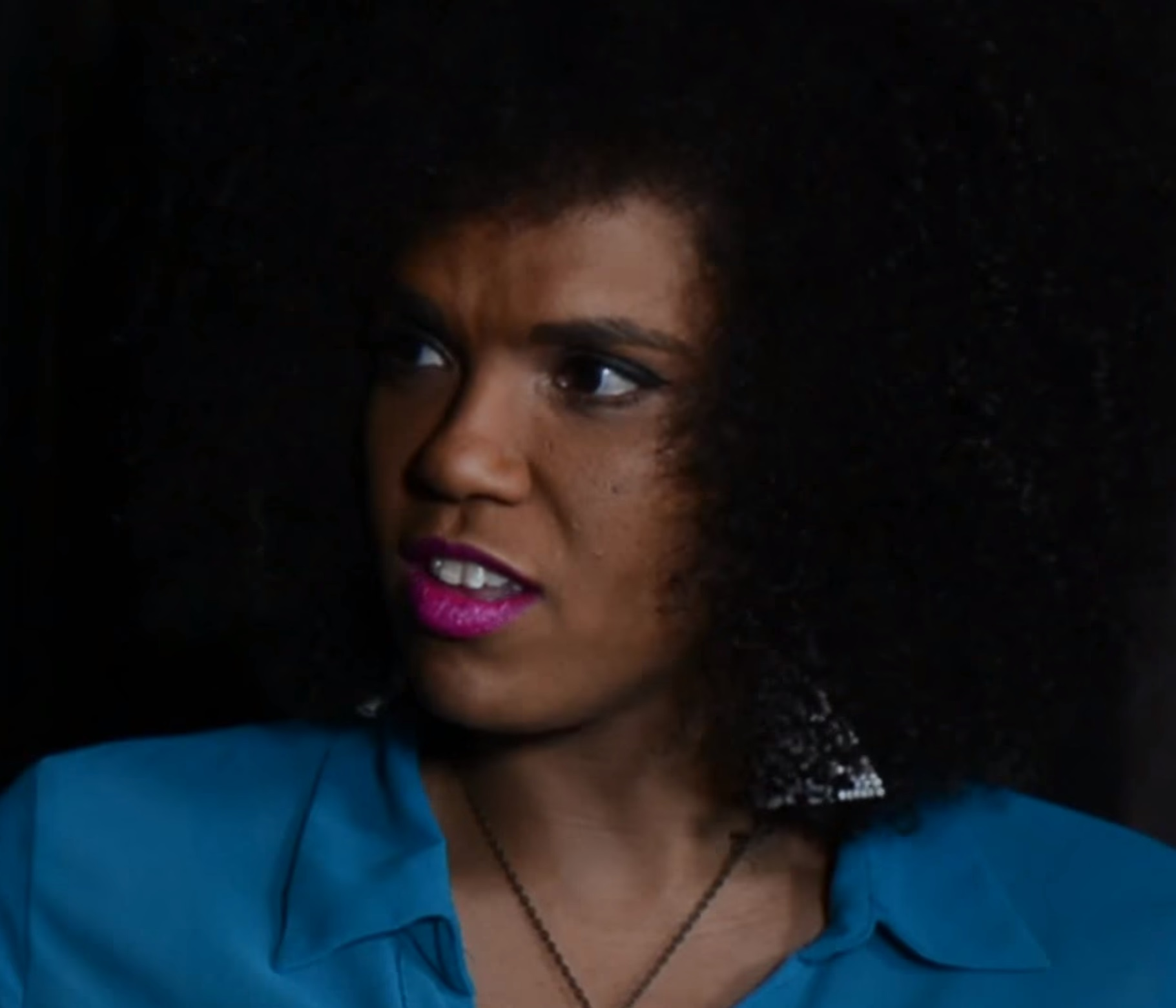
- Imarisha discusses Octavia's Brood on The Laura Flanders Show in 2015
- Occupations: Writer, activist
- Writing career
- Genre: Visionary fiction

Walidah Imarisha (Amharic: ወሊዳ ኢማሪሻ) is an American writer, activist, educator and spoken word artist.

== Career ==
=== Writing ===
Imarisha is co-editor, with Adrienne Maree Brown, of Octavia's Brood: Science Fiction Stories From Social Justice Movements, named after the legendary science fiction writer Octavia Butler. She also co-edited Another World Is Possible, the first anthology out in response to the 9/11 attacks.

Imarisha is the author of the poetry collection Scars/Stars (Drapetomedia, 2013) and the nonfiction book focused on criminal justice issues, Angels with Dirty Faces: Dreaming Beyond Bars (AK Press/IAS, 2016), which won the 2017 Oregon Book Award for Creative Nonfiction. She was a member of the poetry duo Good Sista/Bad Sista, and appeared on Puerto Rican punk band Ricanstruction's second album, Love and Revolution. Her words have been featured in Total Chaos: The Art And Aesthetics of Hip Hop, Letters From Young Activists, Daddy, Can I Tell You Something, Word Warriors: 35 Women Leaders in the Spoken Word Revolution, The Quotable Rebel, Near Kin: A Collection of Words and Art Inspired by Octavia Butler, Joe Strummer: Punk Rock Warlord, Stories for Chip: A Tribute to Samuel R. Delany, and Life During Wartime: Resisting Counterinsurgency.

Imarisha was also one of the founders, and the first editor, of the political hip hop publication AWOL Magazine. She served on the editorial board for the national Left Turn Magazine, and was the director and co-producer of the Katrina documentary Finding Common Ground in New Orleans.

==== "Visionary Fiction" ====
Imarisha (together with Octavia's Brood co-editor Adrienne Maree Brown) describes her genre of fiction as "visionary fiction":

We believe that radical science fiction is actually better termed visionary fiction because it pulls from real life experience, inequalities and movement building to create innovative ways of understanding the world around us, paint visions of new worlds that could be, and teach us new ways of interacting with one another. Visionary fiction engages our imaginations and hearts, and guides our hands as organizers."

=== Teaching ===
Walidah has taught in Stanford University's Program of Writing and Rhetoric, Pacific Northwest College of the Arts' Master's in Critical Studies Program, Portland State University's Black Studies Department, Oregon State University's Women Gender Sexuality Studies Department, and Southern New Hampshire University's English Department. She presented all over Oregon as a public scholar with Oregon Humanities' Conversation Project for six years on topics such as Oregon Black history, alternatives to incarceration, and the history of hip hop.

=== Organizing ===
Walidah spent six years on the board of the Central Committee for Conscientious Objectors, and helped to found the Human Rights Coalition, a group of prisoners' families and former prisoners with three chapters in Pennsylvania.
