= National Harm Reduction Coalition =

American harm reduction advocacy group

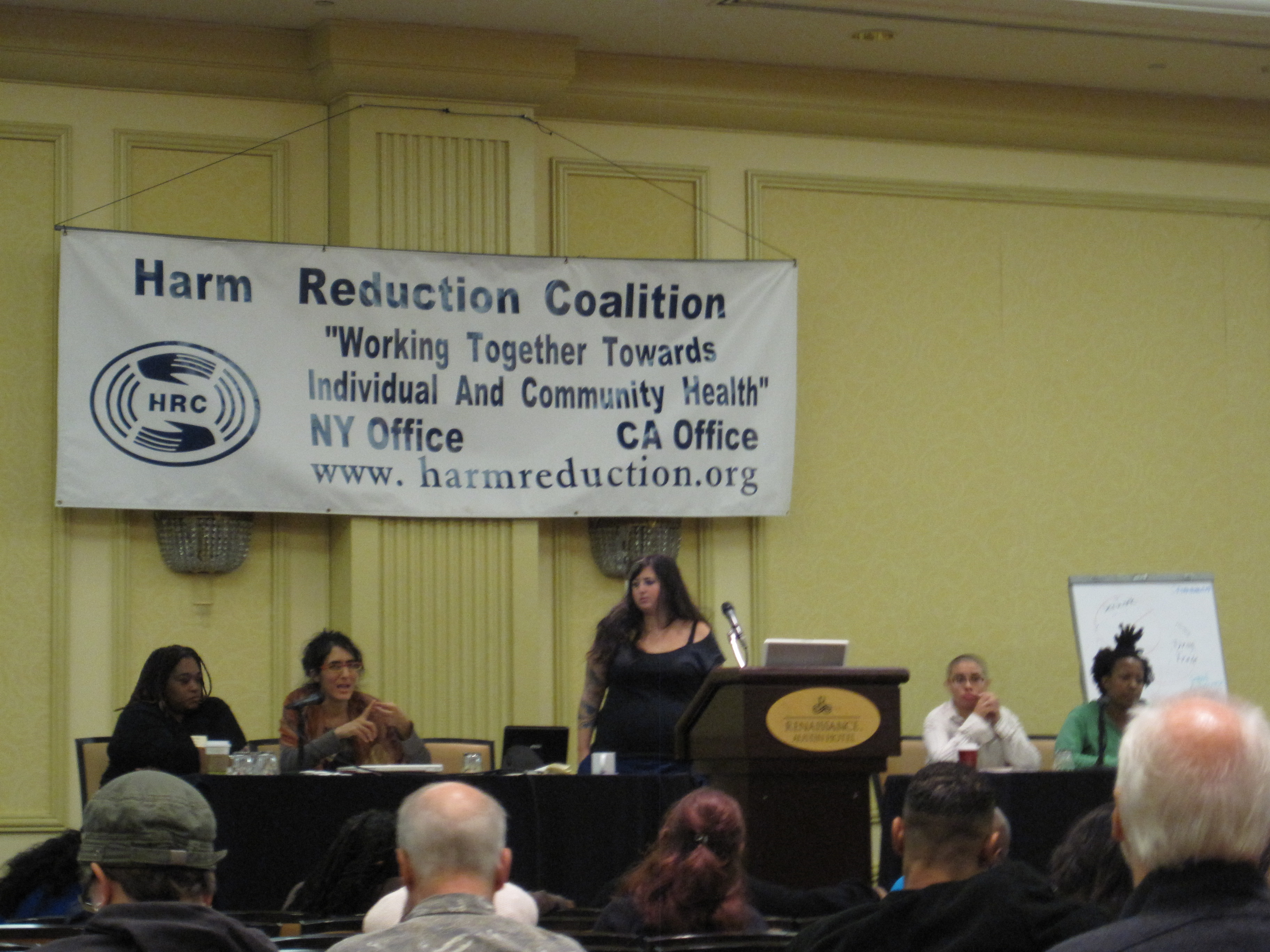
Panelists at a 2010 Harm Reduction Coalition conference

The National Harm Reduction Coalition, previously known as the Harm Reduction Coalition, is an American advocacy organization for people who use drugs, inspired by harm reduction principles.

== History ==
The NHRC emerged from a Harm Reduction Working Group (HRWG) organized in 1993 by Francie and Stephanie Comer, Dan Bigg, George Clark (head of San Francisco's needle exchange), and Dave Purchase. Many of the attendees at the first meeting had worked with (or founded) needle exchanges in different cities, including Los Angeles, San Francisco, Philadelphia and New York. Many were current or former injection drug users. Several of the HRWG's original participants had also been involved with ACT UP.

The HRC itself was founded in San Francisco in 1994, moving to New York City soon after. 700 people attended the HRC's first conference, held in Oakland in 1996. The HRC was initially led by George Clark. Allan Clear was the NHRC's executive director from 1995 until 2016, when he left to take a job in the New York State government. Clear was replaced by Monique Tula, formerly Vice President of Programs at AIDS United. Laura Guzman, an Argentinian-American lawyer who had worked for the HRC since 1995, became the executive director in 2023.

In 2020 the HRC rebranded as the National Harm Reduction Coalition and revamped its website.

The NHRC's 2022 conference was funded by the R Street Institute, according to tax documents.

== Sources ==
- Szalavitz, Maia. Undoing Drugs: How Harm Reduction is Changing the Future of Drugs and Addiction. Hachette Books. 2022.
