= Becky Thompson =

Scholar

- Occupations: Scholar, human rights activist, poet, and yoga teacher
- Awards: Rockefeller Foundation Post-Doctoral Fellowship; Gustavus Myers Outstanding Book Award

Academic background
- Education: University of California, Santa Cruz; Brandeis University; University of Southern Maine
- Website: beckythompsonyoga.com

Becky Thompson is a United States-based scholar, activist, poet, and yoga teacher. She is a professor of sociology in the College of Social Sciences, Policy and Practice at Simmons University. She also teaches yoga at the Dorchester YMCA in Boston. Since 2015 she has worked in Greece as a human rights advocate with people from Syria, Afghanistan, Palestine, Somalia.

She has written and edited several books including Teaching with Tenderness, Survivors on the Yoga Mat, and A Promise and a Way of Life. She has received the Ex Ophidia Poetry Prize and the Gustavus Myers Outstanding Book Award.

Thompson has taught seminars for the International Women's Partnership for Peace and Justice in Chiang Mai, Thailand.

== Education ==
After obtaining her bachelor's degree in sociology from the University of California, Santa Cruz, in 1982, Thompson enrolled at Brandeis University and received her master's and doctoral degrees in sociology in 1986 and 1991, respectively.

From 1992 till 1993, she served as a Rockefeller Foundation postdoctoral fellow in African-American studies at Princeton University.

She earned her MFA in creative writing from the Stonecoast Program in 2021.

== Career ==
=== Teaching ===
Thompson started her academic career with the University of Massachusetts as a lecturer in sociology and women's studies from 1987 to 1989. She then held an appointment at the University of Memphis as assistant professor of sociology before becoming Wesleyan University faculty in African-American studies from 1994 to 1996. From 1996 to 2005 she served as adjunct faculty at the Union Institute of Graduate Studies. In 1996 she also joined the Simmons College faculty, where she became a full professor in 2007. From 2008 to 2010, she served as a professor of women's and ethnic studies at the University of Colorado. Thompson has also held visiting appointments at several institutes, including at China Women's University in 2018 and Duke University in 2002–2003.

Thompson served as the coordinator of the "Teaching Race, Teaching Gender" Speakers Series at Duke University from 2002 till 2003, was the program director for the Women's and Ethnic Studies Program at the University of Colorado from 2008 till 2009, and was the chair of the Department of Sociology at Simmons College from 2012 till 2014. Between 2020 and 2021, she served as an anti-racism consultant at Northeastern University.

=== Scholarship ===
Thompson has authored her books on a variety of topics with a feminist social justice focus. Thompson's first book of poetry was entitled Zero is the Whole I Fall into at Night. Her scholarly books include A Hunger So Wide and So Deep and Survivors on the Yoga Mat. Her book Teaching with Tenderness: Toward an Embodied Practice follows in the tradition of bell hooks’ Teaching to Transgress and Paulo Freire's Pedagogy of the Oppressed. Thompson has also co-edited anthologies on various subjects, including poetry by refugees, multiracial education, HIV/AIDS in the Black diaspora, and racial identity.

Thompson's works have been recognized by the Rockefeller Foundation, the National Endowment for the Humanities, and the American Association of University Women.

== Awards and honors ==
- 1992: Rockefeller Foundation Post-Doctoral Fellowship in Afro-American Studies, Princeton University
- 1994: Gustavus Myers Outstanding Book Award for Beyond a Dream Deferred: Multicultural Education and the Politics of Excellence (co-edited with Sangeeta Tyagi)
- 2009: University of Colorado Mosaic Outstanding Teaching Award
- 2021: Ex Ophidia Press Poetry Book Prize for To Speak in Salt

== Bibliography ==
=== Books ===
- Beyond A Dream Deferred: Multicultural Education and the Politics of Excellence (1993) ISBN 9780816622696
- A Hunger So Wide and So Deep: American Women Speak Out on Eating Problems (1994) ISBN 9781452902777
- Names We Call Home: Autobiography on Racial Identity (1996) ISBN 9780415911627
- Mothering Without A Compass: White Mother's Love, Black Son's Courage (2000) ISBN 9780816636358
- A Promise and a Way of Life: White Antiracist Activism (2001) ISBN 9780816636334
- Fingernails Across the Chalkboard: Poetry and Prose on HIV/AIDS from the Black Diaspora (2007) ISBN 9780883782743
- When the Center Is on Fire: Passionate Social Theory for Our Times (2008) ISBN 9780292717763
- Zero is the Whole I Fall Into at Night (2011) ISBN 9781599483344
- Survivors on the Yoga Mat: Stories for Those Healing from Trauma (2014) ISBN 9781583948262
- Teaching with Tenderness: Toward an Embodied Practice (2017) ISBN 9780252041167
- Making Mirrors: Righting/Writing by and for Refugees (2019) ISBN 9781623719784

=== Selected poetry and poetry reviews ===
- "Teaching poetry in Khora". Anchor Magazine, vol. 8, no. 80, 2017.
- "The lotus grows out of the mud". Nonviolence Magazine, Spring/Winter 2018.
- “Ahmed talks to his 13-year-old brother". CURA, no. 20, Spring 2019.
- “n the Slip Between Coasts; Cartography in Greece”. Feminist Studies, vol. 46, no. 2, 2020.
- “Three Poems". Sonora Review, January 2021.
- “Haiku Questions”. Pensive: A Global Journal of Spirituality and the Arts, 2021.
