= Fledgling (Butler novel) =

2005 vampire novel by Octavia E. Butler

- Paperback cover of Fledgling
- Author: Octavia E. Butler
- Cover artist: Jon Gilbert
- Language: English
- Genre: Science fiction novel
- Publisher: Seven Stories Press
- Publication date: 8 September 2005
- Publication place: United States
- Media type: Print (Hardback)
- Pages: 352 (hardcover first edition)
- ISBN: 1-58322-690-7 (hardcover first edition)
- OCLC: 58055361
- Dewey Decimal: 813/.54 22
- LC Class: PS3552.U827 F47 2005

Fledgling is a science fiction vampire novel by American writer Octavia E. Butler, published in 2005. It was the author's final book published before her death in 2006.

== Plot ==
The novel tells the story of Shori, a 53-year-old member of the Ina species, who appears to be a ten-year-old African-American girl. The Ina are nocturnal, long-lived, and derive sustenance by drinking human blood. Though they are physically superior to humans, both in strength and ability to heal from injury, the Ina depend on humans to survive. Their relationships are mutualistic: the Ina's venom provides a significant boost to their humans' immune systems and extends their lives up to 200 years. However, withdrawal from this venom will lead to the human's death.

The story opens as Shori awakens with no knowledge of who or where she is, in a cave and suffering from critical injuries. Although she is burned and has skull trauma, she kills and eats the first creature that approaches her. Eating this creature allows her to heal quickly enough to walk and explore on her own. She runs into the ruins where a construction worker named Wright picks her up on the side of the road; Shori bites Wright because she finds his scent irresistible, and they begin their relationship.

While staying at Wright's uncle's cabin, Shori realizes she's in need of more blood, so she feeds on other inhabitants in the town and develops a relationship with an older woman named Theodora. Shori and Wright return to the burned-out, abandoned village near where she woke up to learn more about her past. They eventually meet Iosif, Shori's father, who tells her the burned-out town was once her home where she had lived with her mother and sisters. They also learn that Wright and Shori's mutually beneficial relationship makes Wright Shori's symbiont. Further, Shori's dark skin is the result of a genetic modification: the Ina were experimenting to make their kind resistant to daylight. All other Ina are white-skinned.

Later, before Shori is able to move in with Iosif, his settlement is burned down as Shori's home was. Shori and Wright meet the only two human symbionts who survived, Celia and Brook. Shori adopts Celia and Brook as her own symbionts to save their lives. Their bonding is initially uncomfortable for all of them, however, as symbionts become addicted to the venom of one particular Ina. The four flee to another house that Iosif owns. While at this new house during the day, they are attacked by several men with gasoline and guns. Because of the genetic enhancements made on Shori, she is awake and they are able to escape.

The group travels to the settlement of the Gordon family (old friends of Iosif), where they are welcomed and guarded by human symbionts during the day. The attackers also raid the settlement, but Shori and the human symbionts are able to fight back. They capture three attackers alive. The Gordon family interrogates the intruders and finds that they are the same attackers who killed Shori's parents and have been sent by the Silks, another Ina family. The Gordons suspect the attacks on Shori are motivated by disdain for the genetic experimentation that created her.

After failing to get a confession from the Silks, the Gordon family calls a Council of Judgment on Shori's behalf. Thirteen Ina families and their symbionts come to the Gordon settlement to discuss the Silks' attack on Shori. During the council, the Silk representative, Katharine Dahlman, sends one of her symbionts to kill Theodora, Shori's symbiont. This attack succeeds. Thus, in addition to issuing a punishment upon the Silks, the Council must also punish Katharine Dahlman. The Silks' sons are taken from them to be adopted by other Ina families, ensuring that the Silk line will die out. Katharine Dahlman is sentenced to have her legs amputated. She refuses this punishment and attempts to kill Shori, who fights back and fatally wounds her. Katharine is killed by being decapitated and burned. After regaining consciousness, Shori decides to join the Brathwaite family and learn the ways of the Ina to create her own family.

== Main themes ==
=== Vampire figure ===
"We Ina don't handle loss as well as most humans do. It's a much rarer thing with us, and when it happens, the grief is ... almost unbearable."

— Butler, Fledgling, 265.

One of the most commented aspects of Fledgling is its unusual type of vampire, the result of Butler's fusion of vampire fiction with science fiction. While the Ina are simply another species coexisting with humanity, the traditional vampire's monstrosity and abnormality routinely symbolizes deviant sexuality and decadence, serves as a foil for humanity, or is a projection of repressed sexual desire or fear of sexual or racial contamination.

Biological rather than supernatural, the Ina do not turn humans into vampires. They are not ruthless, threatening, predatory, intimidating, or generally antagonistic to humans. Instead, they create close-knit Ina-human communities where they cohabitate with selected humans in symbiotic relationships. In fact, as Pramrod Nayar notes, Butler creates an alternate history where humans and Ina have always coexisted in "non-hierarchic, interdependent and unified ecosystems".

Aside from their unusual relationships with humans, the Ina are quite ordinary. Steven Shaviro describes them as having "a culture, with laws and customs, kinship groups, a religion and ethics and a politics, and disputes and power struggles about all these things—just as any group of human beings does". Butler even renders the Ina less than perfect in that they are prone to the intolerance and bigotry usually reserved for humans.

=== Race ===
Some critics view Butler's decision to endow her protagonist with a larger dose of melanin than what is normal for the Ina as a metaphor for how the concept of race is created. Ali Brox, for example, points out that Shori is not just "made black" biologically, but also socially when Ina fixate on her difference. Thus, Shori's skin color forces her to defend herself from a hostile world before she has even learned about institutionalized hierarchies.

Ina bias against humans also serves as a comment on the history of human bigotry, specifically the prejudices of whites against blacks. As Sanchez-Taylor explains, "[t]he displacement of the notion of race into a species conflict allows Butler to have a black protagonist and have a discussion of intolerance without the need to partake in the history of human racism". In Fledgling, this racial discussion takes on a hopeful tone when the majority of the Ina acknowledge Shori as one of their own.

Additionally, endowing Shori with a specific racial identity serves to deconstruct negative stereotypes of blackness. As a black protagonist, she becomes the vehicle through which Butler articulates the lack of Black in the vampire genre and challenges traditional notions of white males as heroes. Moreover, because her blackness was conceived as an evolutionary advantage, it inverts racist notions of blackness as a biological contaminant that leads to degeneracy.

The vampire protagonist of Fledgling is even more unusual, as she has been genetically enhanced. While the Ina are stereotypically white, as is traditional for vampires, Shori's genetic makeup includes human melanin, which renders her skin brown, a necessary trait for her kind to be able to survive exposure to the sun. Sanchez-Taylor suggests that Butler's choice in making Shori dark-skinned aligns Fledgling's narrative with the Afrofuturist idea of defying the predominantly white vampire stereotype, such as those represented in Bram Stoker's or Anne Rice's novels. Such characters traditionally symbolize white masculinity; instead, Butler replaces them with a black, female main character.

Additionally, Shori is portrayed as less intimidating than stereotypical vampires. As Melissa Strong notes, Shori's diminutive size makes her seem non-threatening. Her treatment of symbionts is kind and understanding: instead of considering her symbionts as victims or pawns, Shori's relationship with them reflects mutuality and balance.

When Shori awakes at the beginning of the novel she discovers that she is covered in scars: "My skin was scarred, badly scarred over every part of my body that I could see. The scars were broad, creased, shiny patches of mottled red-brown skin." This description recalls the scars on the bodies of enslaved Africans in the Americas, due to the wounds inflicted by slave masters. LaMonda Horton-Stallings describes Shori's memory loss at the beginning of Fledgling as invoking the erasure of physical and collective memory through Transatlantic slavery. At the beginning of the novel we do not know the race of the narrator, and she has forgotten about the social concept of race, which is first raised in the book when Wright asks Shori: "Ordinary sun exposure burns your skin even though you're black?" (37) Shori responds: "'I'm...' I stopped. I had been about to protest that I was brown, not black, but before I could speak, I understood what he meant." (37) This immediately triggers another memory, and Shori tells Wright, "I think I'm an experiment. I think I can withstand the sun better than... others of my kind." In this sequence the concept of human racial categories is connected with the theme of genetic experimentation and racial difference among the Ina.

=== Speciesism as an allegory of racism ===
Milo Silk, to Shori at the Council of Judgment: "You're not Ina! ...You're not! And you have no more business at this Council than a clever dog!"

— Butler, Fledgling, 238.

Several scholars have noted how Ina discrimination against Shori doubles as commentary on human racist practices. According to Steven Shaviro, racism is the major factor in the conflict between Shori and Ina speciesists such as the Silk family, who view humans as enemies who have annihilated Ina throughout history. These Ina maintain that Ina and human must remain separate species with the Ina as the dominant partner. They consider Shori to be somehow biologically different to the rest of the Ina population, as not even belonging to the same species as them. They refuse to see the shared characteristics between Shori and the rest of the Ina; instead, they deride her because of her difference.

What rewrites these Ina's speciesism as racism, according to Shaviro, is that the genes that make Shori "part human" are also the genes that make her black, as opposed to their "almost grotesquely albino" skin tone. In fact, as Shari Evans notes, the racial insult Russell Silk hurls at Shori during the Council of Judgment ("murdering black mongrel bitch") negates the Ina's avowed difference from human prejudice and instead evokes white supremacy. These human-hating Ina, therefore, commit the equivalent of a hate-crime by destroying all of Shori's family, fueled by an ideology of racial purity and superiority that is not much different than that of Nazis or the Ku Klux Klan. As Ali Brox explains, Shori's hybridity becomes the focus of their hatred because it exposes the falsity of their claims to purity and reminds them of their past abject condition at the hands of humans.

=== Hybridity ===
Fledgling's protagonist is a genetically manipulated creature who combines Ina and human DNA. Her hybridity is perceived as a threat by Ina speciecists, who insist that the separation of Ina and human is essential to maintain the purity of the Ina species. As Ali Brox argues, Shori's existence "opens up a space of cultural uncertainty and instability" that forces Ina families such as the Silks, who suffer the delusion that there is a "pure" and "superior" Ina race, to admit they were once weak, oppressed, and killed by humans. These Ina are hostile towards Shori and interpret her hybridity as a sign of degeneracy. As Gates points out, because her body is a sign of Ina-human miscegenation "[s]he is called at various times a dog, a dirty little nigger bitch, a murdering black mongrel bitch, and more".

Butler's narrative, however, shows that Shori's hybridity is, in fact, an evolutionary advantage. First, it allows her to be awake during the day, which permits her to survive multiple attacks on herself and her symbionts. Second, it makes her venom very powerful, which makes her scent extremely attractive to male Ina and also allows her to collect symbionts easily, making her kind more adaptable than the average Ina. In addition, Shori's hybridity also symbolizes an enhanced or "correct" type of mutualistic symbiosis, as she literally embodies human and Ina DNA working together. Thus, Butler connects hybridity to the survival of not just the Ina, but also of humanity. As Pramrod Nayar contends, in Fledgling hybridity means to take on the qualities of the other race and thus becomes a "companionate species" of others in order to survive.

=== Mutualistic symbiosis ===
Shori reflecting on the pluralistic communities created by Ina/human symbiosis:

"I wanted that—a home in which my symbionts enjoyed being with me and enjoyed one another and raised their children as I raised mine. That felt right, felt good."

— Butler, Fledgling, 127.

In Fledgling, humans and Ina are bonded into a form of mutualistic symbiosis, a type of relationship that Shari Evans connects to the concept of "partnership" as defined in Butler's Parable of the Talents: "offering the greatest possible benefit while doing the least possible harm". While in the Parable novels the purpose of partnership is to ameliorate the negative effects of beings or processes that cannot be resisted or avoided, in Fledgling mutualistic symbiosis serves to challenge the idea that the Ina are a superior species by making Ina and humans interdependent on each other. As Susana Morris explains, even though the Ina can satisfy their need for companionship, physical contact, and sexual pleasure with one another, they also must have a deep emotional connection with their symbionts in order to survive.

Likewise, humans crave intimacy with one particular Ina after they have been infected by her or his venomous bite, and may die when they lose their Ina. Butler devotes several moments in the novel to portray the discomfort this required loss of agency causes in the human symbionts. Nevertheless, Fledgling is the first time that Butler illustrates a co-dependent relationship from the point of view of the dominating partner, unlike in previous works such as her novel Dawn or her celebrated short story Bloodchild.

Scholars have linked Fledgling's mutualistic symbiosis to various theoretical positions. Pramrod Nayar sees it as a fictional depiction of the relationship that professor Donna Haraway defines as "companion species" in "Encounters with Companion Species: Entangling Dogs, Baboons, Philosophers, and Biologists". Joy Sanchez-Taylor and Shari Evans recognize it as a form of social commentary: human beings must move away from parasitic, hierarchical relationships and toward symbiosis with each other and other species. Critic Susana Morris connects Fledgling's symbiotic relationships to the Afrofuturistic feminist desire to portray liberation from current forms of hegemonic dominance. Thus, the "cooperation, interdependence, and complex understandings of power" that mutualistic symbiosis represents becomes Butler's "futurist social model, one that is fundamentally at odds with racism, sexism, and sectarian violence".

=== Alternative sexualities ===
Wright, to Shori, when she commands him to seek safety for himself and the rest of her symbionts even if it means leaving her in danger:

"That is the most unromantic declaration of love I've ever heard. Or is that what you're saying? Do you love me, Shori, or do I just taste good?"

— Butler, Fledgling, 139

Fledgling challenges traditional expectations of sexual categorization and proposes alternative ways for individuals to relate to one another by having Ina sexual norms override human norms. Ina-human sexual relationships are polyamorous, with one Ina as the primary partner of several male and female human symbionts. Also, symbionts often engage in same-sex and/or opposite-sex relationships with other symbionts. Further, the Ina mate in family-based groups—a group of sisters mating with a group of brothers from a different family. An Ina household, therefore, blurs the boundaries between familial and erotic love by having its members involved with each other sexually.

Butler highlights the strangeness of the Ina sexual arrangements through the reactions of Shori's first symbiont, Wright. According to Melissa Strong, Wright responds to Shori's sexuality with biphobia; for him, proper sexuality has clear categories: male and female, heterosexuality and homosexuality.

Ultimately, Butler's inclusion of alternative sexualities serves to erode rigid hierarchies. Strong explains that the fusing of family and sexual relations destabilizes the traditional relationship between slave and master. Similarly, Susana Morris argues that, in the spirit of Afrofuturistic feminism, Fledgling's queer sexualities "uncouple dominance from power", so that the patriarchal hold over those marginalized is replaced by "coalition and power sharing".

=== Difference as means of survival ===
Fledgling is typical of Butler's work in that her protagonist's difference from the Ina norm marks her as an evolutionary step in the right direction, both in biological and in cultural terms. Biologically, her dark skin and ability to stay awake during the day allows her to save herself, her loved ones, and an entire Ina community from a series of attacks occurring during daylight. Culturally, her blackness symbolizes her closeness to humans, a trait that is portrayed as desirable for a proper Ina-human relationship. As Shari Evans explains, Shori's amnesia, which the Ina treat like a disability, in fact gives her an advantage. Her memory loss leads her to question her belief in the underlying arrangements forming Ina society that are normally left unchallenged. In addition, Shori must re-create her relationship to herself and her culture; this gives her an advantage, because she is able to decide what kind of Ina she will become with the support of her symbionts. Unburdened by cultural memory, Shori has the ability to choose what she wants to remember and how she wants to portray herself, using her own sense of morality.

Likewise, Pramrod Nayar believes that Shori's loss is what makes her the best of all possible Ina, and therefore a symbol of the future. Butler proposes that vampires should become less vampiric by attaining more human qualities such as emotional attachments and sense of community. Meanwhile, humans should also lose certain aspects of themselves as well, such as their vulnerability to disease and tendency to be sexually possessive. Only by losing their weak characteristics and gaining stronger ones, the human and vampire species are able to evolve and improve. Fledgling creates a progressive plan by converting Ina and human into a companionate species through the adoption of qualities of the Other.

=== Agency ===
If we found the people who had murdered both my male and female families, I wanted to kill them, had to kill them. How else could I keep my new family safe?"

— Butler, Fledgling, 105.

Fledgling explores the complexities of self-determination through its protagonist's struggle to regain control of her life and through the dependence created by Ina-human symbiosis. Shori is a typical Bildungsroman protagonist who begins with little agency and ends in charge of her life. As Florian Bast argues, Butler's novel is a typical African American narrative where the victim of a racially motivated crime is in a quest for the truth about her former self, about the agony that she has endured, and about her assailants' identity. By the end of the story, Shori has conquered both her own ignorance and the speciesist discrimination that seeks to define her thanks to her personal strength and the help of her symbionts and Ina family and friends. She is ready to become a full-fledged member of Ina society. Shari Evans also notes that Shori's amnesia allows her to decide for herself, with the aid of her symbionts, what type of Ina she will become.

In contrast, the symbiotic partnership between Ina and humans challenges traditional ways of thinking about agency, especially because the relationship is hierarchical, with the Ina as the masters of their symbionts. Wright, for example, begins the story as a free agent but his "happily ever after" ending with Shori requires that he give up some of his agency. In addition, the agency of both the Ina and the humans is restricted by biological realities, as the addictive relationship created by chemicals in the Ina saliva when they bite their symbionts cannot be undone. For the Ina, this chemical bond means they need to be in constant physical contact with their symbionts. For the symbionts, it means that they are physically dependent on their Ina, as they could die if their Ina dies, and that they are bound to follow their Ina's commands.

These complications of agency, Bast argues, mean that Fledgling is "openly asking whether the highest degree of agency is automatically the most desirable state of being or whether there is a higher potential for happiness in choosing a specific kind of dependence".

=== Childhood ===
Shori's depiction in Fledgling complicates normative notions of childhood as inherently innocent or devoid of sexual desire. Throughout the novel we learn that Shori is a 53 year old Ina that looks like a 10 year old girl. Her petite stature is constantly articulated throughout the novel, potentially raising discomforts for attentive readers as pedophilia might come to mind---particularly when she has sexual encounters with her adult human symbionts. Scholars such as Habiba Ibrahim have turned to Fledgling as a commentary on Enlightenment notions of childhood innocence and how such ideologies do not apply to Black children, and certainly not to Black girls. In other words, childhood is not a luxury Black children are bestowed. Ibrahim tells us, "The relegation of all slaves to the ranks of quasi-childhood was part and parcel of the Enlightenment-era tendency to distinguish reasoning subjects from irrational beings" (320). Through this reading, Shori emerges as an exemplar of disrupting normative Enlightenment conceptualizations of 'the child'.

== Backgrounds ==
In an interview with Juan Gonzalez and Amy Goodman for Democracy Now!, Butler explained that she had written Fledgling as a diversion after becoming overwhelmed by the grimness of her Parable series. To distract herself, she had read vampire fantasy novels, which tempted her to try writing one. As she explained in an interview with Allison Keyes, it took her a while to find the focus of the novel until a friend suggested that what vampires wanted, besides human blood, was the ability to walk in the sun. She then decided to create vampires as a separate species and have them engineer the capacity to withstand sunlight by adding human melanin to their DNA.

Though Fledgling is unique on its take on what motivates vampires, it is not the first story to have a black vampire as its protagonist. In the 1970s, the films Blacula and Scream Blacula Scream depicted a black vampire as the nemesis of white supremacists. In the 1990s, the Blade film series, based on a Marvel Comics character, introduced a black human-vampire superhero who can tolerate sunlight. In addition, according to scholars Joy Sanchez-Taylor and Susana M. Morris, Fledgling belongs to a flourishing tradition of Afrofuturistic black vampire fiction, as represented by Jewelle Gomez's novel The Gilda Stories, as well as by the series African Immortals by Tananarive Due and The Vampire Huntress Legend by Leslie Esdaile Banks.

== Reception ==
Fledgling received mostly positive feedback. Novelist Junot Diaz declared it his "book of the year", calling it "[a] harrowing meditation on dominance, sex, addiction, miscegenation and race that completely devours the genre which gave rise to it". Butler scholar Sandra Y. Govan pronounced it "[a]n extremely well-crafted science fiction story... [that] engages us and is exciting because it invokes and riffs upon vampire myth and legend while wearing a number of masks—murder mystery, crime novel, coming-of-age, innocence-to-experience, initiation, quest tale, and outsider/survivor novel".

Many critics also praised Butler's exploration of innovative and transgressive topics and themes. The New York Times declared Fledgling "a captivating novel that tests the limits of 'otherness' and questions what it means to be truly human." Susanna Sturgis from Women's Review of Books pointed out that "[t]he vampire premise is perfectly suited to themes that Butler has been exploring since her earliest novels: interdependence, freedom and unfreedom, and the cost of human survival". Susan Salter Reynolds of the Los Angeles Times praised Butler's ability to address controversial topics in a way that leaves the reader open to them: "[t]he idea of an ordinary man picking up an apparent 10-year-old girl, taking her home and having sex with her is beyond the bounds of civilized behavior. Yet somehow, Butler, with her quiet, spare language, helps us overcome this and many other cross-cultural hurdles in the book."

Reviewers also commented favorably on Butler's reinvention of the vampire figure, with Ron Charles of The Washington Post arguing that "Fledgling doesn't just resurrect the pale trappings of vampire lore, it completely transforms them in a startlingly original story about race, family and free will." While reviewing the novel for the journal Gothic Studies, Charles L. Crow noted that "[while] Fledgling may be the least Gothic of Butler's fictions.... Butler makes unsettling demands of the reader, as always, and we must at the beginning accept as narrator and heroine a vampire whose first act is to kill and eat a man who is trying to help her."

Even though many found Fledgling's plot skillfully rendered and gripping, a few reviewers described the novel as slow-paced and not very engaging. Rob Gates argues that "Fledgling is certainly not a perfect book. The pacing in the second half of the book is quite slow at times, and the dynamics of the Ina trial did not sustain my interest well." Reviewer Rachel Shimp claims that "Butler's sparse prose is meted out at times as painstakingly as it must feel for Shori each time she's flooded with a new memory. The slow pace of the book works with her character-in-progress, but it builds to a climax you see coming midway through. It's the only disappointing thing about Fledgling, which otherwise offers a unique vision of the modern vampire, and a kick-ass heroine to boot."

== Sequels ==
The Octavia E. Butler Papers at the Huntington Library include multiple drafts for potential sequels of Fledgling which continue to follow Shori and her growing family as they navigate their relationships and both human and Ina societies. New characters would have included additional human symbionts, the newest of whom, Darya, has a history of trauma and abuse. Possible conflicts may have included a return of the Silk family, seeking revenge on Shori. Possible versions included "Asylum" or "Shadow Rise" (alternatively "Shadow Memory"). In a journal entry in December 2005, Butler wrote, "I don't want to spend the last years of my life writing Shori stories but a Shori story is what I have now."

== Television adaptation ==
In July 2021, HBO gave production a pilot order to a television adaptation of the novel. Issa Rae and J.J. Abrams were to be executive producers of the project. The adaptation is being written by Sonya Winton-Odamtten and Jonathan I. Kidd, who were also involved with Lovecraft Country. The pilot is being developed by Warner Bros. Television, with Rae’s production company HOORAE and Abrams’ Bad Robot also producing. Co-executive producers include Rachel Rusch Rich and Sara Rastogi.
