= Casanegra =

Casanegra may refer to:

- Casanegra (novel)
- Casanegra (film)
