= Jonathan I. Kidd =

Television producer and writer

Jonathan I. Kidd is a television producer and writer, With his writing partner, Sonya Winton-Odamtten, he has worked on the shows NCIS New Orleans, The Whole Truth, Touch, and Oasis. He is a co-executive producers of HBO's Lovecraft Country.

== Life and education ==
Kidd currently resides in California, but was born in Mansfield, Ohio. Kidd went to The University of Michigan, where he earned his Bachelor's degree in African American Studies, and English. Kidd obtained his Master's in Philosophy, and a Doctoral degree from Yale University, in African-American Studies and English.

== Theater ==
In 2001 Kidd helped found the non-profit theater company Adam, Eve, & Steve Productions (AES) while at Yale. They directed and produced numerous successful theater productions and took a hiatus from their studies in 2003-2004 to complete the documentary "Battleground for a New Generation," focusing on youth mobilization during the Presidential election.

In 2012, Kidd's autobiographical essay, "One Day A DJ Saved My Life," was published as one of 25 essays by gay men of color to be featured in the anthology titled For Colored Boys Who Have Considered Suicide When the Rainbow is Still Not Enough: Coming of Age, Coming Out, and Coming Home, curated by Keith Boykin.

== Career ==
Kidd started his television writing career when he got accepted into the Warner Brothers Television Writers Workshop in 2010. He achieved success with various shows, including ABC's The Whole Truth, Fox's Touch, and Amazon's Oasis. Notably, they sold several spec pilots, including: The 4th Reich (Showtime) with Robert De Niro and Jane Rosenthal attached to executive produce, Rodeo Drive (Warner Horizon), Southern Gothic (Lifetime) and Trader (HBO) with Tika Sumpter attached to star in and executive produce.

In 2016, Kidd's NCIS New Orleans episode "Rock-a-Bye-Baby" was nominated for a GLAAD Award and in 2021, they received an Emmy nomination for Outstanding Drama Series for Lovecraft Country.

In 2019, Kidd signed an overall deal with HBO, continuing their work as the Co-Executive Producers of the award-winning HBO series Lovecraft Country.

Kidd's ongoing collaboration with HBO has been punctuated by achievements, including being finalists of the Ray Bradbury Nebula Award for Dramatic Presentation in 2021, joining the Advisory Council of WarnerMedia Access Writers Program, joining the LA Theatre Works Board of Directors, and securing a pilot order from HBO for their series adaptation of Octavia Butler's final novel, Fledgling, featuring Issa Rae and J.J. Abrams among the executive producers. Currently Kidd is in the development, writing, and Executive Producing a new limited series, Say Their Names, inspired by the Los Angeles serial killer, the Grim Sleeper, and intricately explores the life of activist Margaret Prescod.

== Philanthropy ==
Beyond this professional and theatric endeavors, Kidd was engaged in philanthropy initiatives, like the "Feed Black COVID-19 Health Workers Challenge." Collaborating with Frontline Foods, the duo enlisted over 40 Black Hollywood writers, extending support to healthcare workers in underserved Black communities nationwide.

Kidd created "The Dr. Jonathan I. Kidd Senior Prize" to honor his educational passion. Kidd was a Walter Rodney Essay Competition winner and an AAS/English major at UM before earning a dual Ph.D. in African American Studies and English from Yale University. He utilized his pedagogical foundations to embark upon a successful career as a television writer and producer. With this prize, Kidd wishes to recognize LSA students who complete a significant senior project and to honor students enrolled in DAAS courses who demonstrate intellectual curiosity, a record of academic excellence, and a commitment to giving back to the African diaspora.

== Filmography ==
=== Television ===
Year	Show	Writer	Producer	Credit(s)	Episode(s)	Notes
2020	Lovecraft Country	Yes	Yes	Co-Executive Producer	"Strange Case"	Season 1, Episode 5
2020	Lovecraft Country	Yes	Yes	Co-Executive Producer	"Rewind 1921"	Season 1, Episode 9
2019	Treadstone	No	Yes	Supervising Producer	"The Berlin Proposal"	Season 1, episode 3
2019	Treadstone	No	Yes	Supervising Producer	"The Kwon Conspiracy"	Season 1, Episode 2
2019	Treadstone	No	Yes	Supervising Producer	"The Cicada Protocol"	Season 1, Episode 1
2018	Trader	Yes	Yes	Executive Producer/ Creator		Sold to HBO (Undeveloped)
2017	Oasis	Yes	Yes	Co-Executive Producer	Mini Room	(Unreleased) Based on the film
2015	Wicked City	Yes	Yes	Co-Producer	"Blizzard of Ozz"	Season 1, Episode 6
2015	NCIS New Orleans	Yes	No	Executive Story Editor	"Rock-a-Bye-Baby"	Season 1, Episode 20
2015	NCIS New Orleans	Yes	No	Executive Story Editor	"La Carnaval De la Mort"	Season 1, episode 15
2014	NCIS New Orleans	Yes	No	Executive Story Editor	"Chasing Ghosts"	Season 1, Episode 9
2014	Killer Women	Yes	No		"In and Out"	Season 1, Episode 5
2013	The 4th Reich	Yes	Yes	Co-Executive Producer	Written on Spec "Pilot"	Sold to Showtime (Undeveloped)
2012	Touch	Yes	No	"Story By" Credit		Season 1
2011	Memphis Beat	Yes	No	"Written by"	"Body of Evidence"	Season 2, Episode 7
2010	The Whole Truth	No	No	"Story By" Credit	"The End"	Season 1, Episode 13
2010	The Whole Truth	Yes	No	"Written by"	"Perfect Witness"	Season 1, Episode 10
2010	The Whole Truth	Yes	No	"Teleplay" Credit	"When Cougars Attack"	Season 1, Episode 5

=== Theater ===
Title	Playwright	Directed	Produced
There Must Be a God Somewhere	Yes	No	Yes - (Adam, Eve, and Steve Productions)
Shaka	Jan Henson Dow and Robert Schroeder	No	Yes - (Adam, Eve, and Steve Productions)
Matri-focal Concentric Zones of Violence Revisited: Part One	Sonya Winton-Odamtten	Yes	Yes - (Adam, Eve, and Steve Productions)
