= The Good House =

The Good House may refer to:

- The Good House (film), a 2021 comedy-drama starring Signourney Weaver and Kevin Kline

- The Good House, the 2013 novel by Ann Leary and on which the 2021 film is based

- The Good House (novel), a 2003 horror novel by Tananarive Due
