= Eso Won Books =

Independent Black-Owned Bookshop in Los Angeles

Coordinates: 34°0′18.7″N 118°19′54.08″W

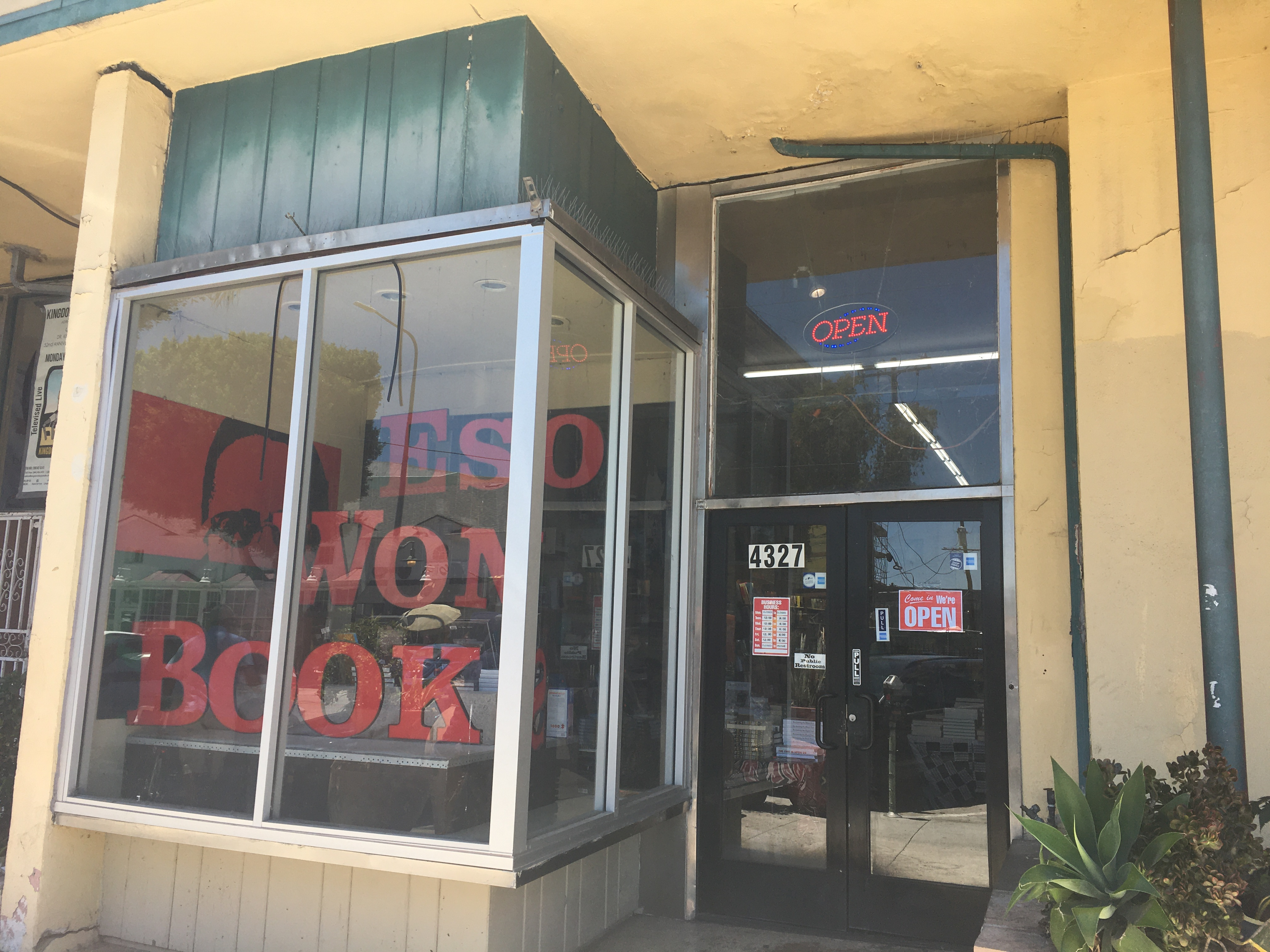
- Eso Won Books, 2021
- Industry: Bookseller, retail
- Founded: 1988; 38 years ago
- Founder: James Fugate, Tom Hamilton
- Headquarters: Los Angeles, California, United States
- Number of locations: 1 store
- Area served: Los Angeles metropolitan area
- Products: New books primarily about and written by African Americans
- Owner: James Fugate, Tom Hamilton
- Website: www.esowonbookstore.com

Eso Won Books, an independent bookstore located at 4327 Degnan Boulevard in the Historic Leimert Park Village neighborhood of South Los Angeles, was one of the largest Black-owned bookstores in the United States. In 2021, Publishers Weekly awarded the business Bookstore of the Year.

== Description ==
Eso Won Books was an 1,800-sq-ft bookstore with an inventory mix of African-American classic and contemporary titles, including a children's section. The bookstore regularly hosted author events and community gatherings. It closed in 2022.

== History ==
Eso Won Books started in the summer of 1988 in Los Angeles. Eso Won, which means “water over rocks” in the Ethiopian Amharic language, was originally named Eso Won Books on Wheels.

James Fugate and Tom Hamilton, founders and co-owners, said their goal was to sell books at community events, such as the Los Angeles Times Book Fair, and be "seen as not just a Black bookstore for Black people, but a Los Angeles bookstore in which everyone is welcome."

Eso Won Books hosted author signings with Muhammad Ali and his biographer Howard Bingham, historian Yosef Ben-Jochannan, Octavia Butler, John Henrik Clarke, Johnnie L. Cochran, Jr., poet Nikki Giovanni, Berry Gordy, Jr., Patti LaBelle, Wynton Marsalis, Gloria Naylor, Sonia Sanchez, Kwame Ture (Stokely Carmichal), and Alice Walker.

== Recognition ==
Ta-Nehisi Coates, author of Between the World and Me, remarked in one interview that Eso Won Books is "my favorite bookstore" and was also on his first book tour.

== In popular culture ==
- Issa Rae's Insecure TV series season 3 (2018), episode "Fresh-Like" includes a scene in Leimert Park outside Eso Won Books.
- Casanegra: A Tennyson Hardwick Story, a 2007 mystery novel by actor Blair Underwood and writers Tananarive Due and Steven Barnes, includes mentions of recognizable Los Angeles features such as the restaurant chain Roscoe's House of Chicken and Waffles and Eso Won Books.

== See also ==
- Books in the United States
- African-American bookstores
