= The Between =

Novel by Tananarive Due

- Author: Tananarive Due
- Language: English
- Genre: Horror
- Publisher: HarperCollins
- Publication date: 1995
- Publication place: United States
- Media type: Print (paperback)
- Pages: 288 pp
- ISBN: 0-06-092726-7
- OCLC: 34760437

The Between is a 1995 horror novel by Tananarive Due and her debut novel. It follows a middle-class African-American husband and father who has lived with the belief that he cheated death as a child. When his family becomes the target of racist threats, he suffers a psychological breakdown intertwined with supernatural elements that blur the boundary between reality and death. It was nominated for the 1996 Bram Stoker Award.

== Critical reception ==
James Polk, reviewing for The New York Times, wrote, "Part horror novel, part detective story and part speculative fiction, The Between is a mix of genres. Yet it is no hybrid. It is a finely honed work that always engages and frequently surprises."

== Development of novel ==
The lengthy autobiographical essay by Due elucidates the history and context of her first novel The Between among many other works and details of her life.
