= Ember Award =

Annual literary award for speculative fiction

- Awarded for: Individuals, for their extended bodies of work which have not historically been recognized by awards entities
- Country: United States
- Presented by: FIYAH Literary Magazine
- First award: 2020; 6 years ago
- Most recent winner: Martha Wells
- Website: ignyteawards.fiyahlitmag.com

The Ember Award, also known as The Ember Award for Unsung Contributions to Genre, is a literary award given annually as part of the Ignyte Awards.

== Winners and finalists ==
* Winners

Year	Winners & Finalists	Ref.
2020	LeVar Burton*	
2020	Keidra Chaney	
2020	Tananarive Due	
2020	Malon Edwards	
2020	Nisi Shawl	
2021	Dhonielle Clayton*	
2021	K. Tempest Bradford	
2021	Clarion West Writers Workshop	
2021	Tananarive Due	
2021	Michi Trota	
2022	Tananarive Due*	
2022	Maurice Broaddus	
2022	Malinda Lo	
2022	Julia Rios	
2022	Sheree Renée Thomas	
2023	Afronauts Podcast*	
2023	Maurice Broaddus	
2023	Alex Brown	
2023	Chen Ruoxi	
2023	Kate Elliott	
2024	Sheree Renée Thomas*	
2024	Kate Elliott	
2024	Kwame Mbalia	
2024	DaVaun Sanders	
2024	A. C. Wise	
2025	Sonia Sulaiman*	
2025	Charlie Jane Anders	
2025	Indrapramit Das	
2025	Renay	
2025	Nisi Shawl	
2026	Martha Wells*	
2026	Maurice Broaddus	
2026	Karen Lord	
2026	Dave Ring	
2026	Arley Sorg	
