= Blood Colony =

2008 novel by Tananarive Due

- Author: Tananarive Due
- Language: English
- Series: African Immortals #3
- Genre: Science fiction, Horror
- Publication date: 2008
- Publication place: United States
- Preceded by: The Living Blood

Blood Colony is a novel by writer Tananarive Due. It is the third book in Due's African Immortals series. It is preceded by My Soul to Keep 1997 and The Living Blood (2001). It got nominated for the Hurston/Wright Legacy Award in 2009.

== Premise ==
A hidden African clan of immortals possesses blood with the power to heal almost any ailment, including HIV/AIDS. The story centers on Fana Wolde, a unique young immortal born with extraordinary abilities. When her mortal best friend is imprisoned, Fana escapes her protected home and joins the Underground Railroad, a network distributing the life-saving blood. However, she becomes the target of a violent, age-old sect tied to the Vatican. Fana must confront these deadly forces as her people search for her and race to uncover the sect's origins, with the lives of everyone she loves at stake.
