= The Reformatory =

2023 novel by Tananarive Due

- Author: Tananarive Due
- Language: English
- Genre: Historical fiction, horror, literary fiction
- Set in: Gracetown, Florida
- Publisher: Saga Press, Simon & Schuster
- Publication date: October 31, 2023
- Publication place: United States
- Media type: Print
- Pages: 576
- Awards: 2023 Bram Stoker Award for Best Novel; 2024 World Fantasy Award for Best Novel
- ISBN: 9781982188344

The Reformatory is a 2023 novel by Tananarive Due which combines elements of horror, historical fiction, and literary fiction. It is loosely based on the Dozier School for Boys and the atrocities committed there. The novel received critical acclaim, including winning the 2023 Bram Stoker Award for Best Novel and 2024 World Fantasy Award for Best Novel.

== Plot ==
In 1950, twelve-year-old Robert Stephens Jr. lives with his sister Gloria in Gracetown, Florida. Many children in Gracetown are able to sense “haints”, an ability they gradually lose with age. The children’s mother has died of cancer. Their father was falsely accused of raping a white woman and has been driven out of town. Robert and Gloria are left in the care of the octogenarian Ms. Lottie.

Robert has a minor scuffle with a white teenager who made advances towards Gloria. Robert is sentenced to six months at the Gracetown School for Boys after a sham trial. The reformatory has a reputation for cruelty; many young men imprisoned there have died in incidents including fires, beatings, and neglect. At the reformatory, Robert sees the ghosts of several young prisoners. Despite this, he is comforted by the spirit of his deceased mother. He befriends Blue and Redbone, two other young inmates. Redbone and Robert are whipped by the sadistic Warden Haddock for discussing escape.

Meanwhile, Gloria and Ms. Lottie hire a lawyer from the NAACP to appeal Robert’s sentence. In retaliation, the KKK threatens a majority-Black neighborhood in Gracetown and burns down the Stephens family cabin.

Haddock realizes that Robert can see haints. He asks Robert to help him trap the spirits in exchange for early release. Haddock is concerned that the presence of ghosts will further damage the reformatory’s reputation. Using various hoodoo techniques, Haddock teaches Robert to imprison spirits in the “haint jar”, which is stored in the warden’s office. Haddock orders Robert to catch the ghost of a young man who died in a fire in 1920; Robert realizes that this ghost is his friend Blue. Blue tells Robert that Warden Haddock set the fire that killed Blue and many other boys. They do not want to move to the afterlife until the warden has paid for his crimes. Blue tells Robert that Warden Haddock has pictures of sexual abuse and torture hidden in his desk; he asks Robert to expose the warden.

On visitation day, Gloria and Ms. Lottie pass a plan to Robert: they plan to break him out of the reformatory. Robert plans to escape with Redbone. However, the warden locks up Redbone to punish Robert for failing to catch enough haints. Redbone is then killed by an older boy.

On the day of the escape, Blue sets fire to the kitchens as a distraction. Robert breaks into Haddock’s office, stealing the haint jar and the incriminating photographs. Haddock soon realizes what Robert has done and pursues him. Robert releases the ashes into a creek, freeing the trapped spirits. Blue and the other spirits released from the jar kill Haddock by turning his own hunting dog against him. Robert and Gloria escape to Chicago, where they reunite with their father.

== Major themes ==
Writing for the Los Angeles Review of Books, Melanie Marotta stated that the novel "centers on family dynamics and systemic racism and ends up fitting firmly within the neo-slave narrative genre." Marotta defines this subgenre as "a contemporary genre in which Black authors reenvision American enslavement while providing their protagonists with some agency over their lives—something that does not happen in a formerly enslaved person’s story." In some cases, authors in this genre include ghosts "to impress on the characters and readers alike that the United States’ past may not be erased; it continues to haunt and recall the enormity of systemic racism." Marotta writes that Due invokes the slave narrative by alluding to works such as Narrative of the Life of Frederick Douglass, an American Slave. Due invokes Douglass by "loosely disguis[ing]" the Reformatory as a plantation, with Warden Haddock acting as the enslaver. Due also invokes Ralph Ellison's novel Invisible Man through the character of David R. Loehmann, a Jewish social worker. Marotta further comments that the novel's characters are "entangled with one another through the ongoing power of enslavement and systemic racism".

The same review commented that the novel explores the corruption of the American justice system and the town of Gracetown itself. Lyle McCormack, the teenager whom Robert kicked to protect Gloria, is a member of a powerful local white family which has become wealthy due to slavery. The McCormack family has "monetized the Black body, an act of dehumanization that did not end with emancipation as it continued into the 20th century." The review notes that after the fire in which Blue died, the reformatory serves as a "synecdoche for the town itself." Miss Anne believes that she is a supporter of racial equality, but Gloria "calls attention to Anne’s hypocrisy, repeatedly reminding her that her family once owned people." The character of Miz Lottie concludes that "'Maybe it’s a curse on us—a town named for Grace that don’t act like no godly place.'"

== Style ==
After Robert's sentencing to the reformatory, the novel unfolds through two points of view. In one, Robert's perspective is presented from inside the reformatory. In the second, Gloria and other characters work to free him from imprisonment.

== Background ==
The novel is dedicated to the real-life Robert Stephens, Due's great-uncle who died at the Dozier School for Boys in 1937 at the age of fifteen. In 2013, Due learned of her great-uncle's existence when she received a call from the Florida state attorney general's office informing her that she likely had a relative buried at the school. This inspired her to write The Reformatory, a process which took seven years.

== Reception ==
In a starred review, Kirkus Reviews praised the novel and stated that it reminds readers "that racism forges its own lasting, unbearable nightmares". The review also called the novel "at once an ingenious ghost story, a white-knuckle adventure, and an illuminating if infuriating look back at a shameful period in American jurisprudence that, somehow, doesn’t seem so far away." In a starred review, Melanie Marotta of the Los Angeles Review of Books concluded that "Due’s latest effort will appeal not only to die-hard Due fans but also to conscientious readers determined to bring American enslavement and racism to the forefront of US history." Becky Spratford of Library Journal also gave the novel a starred reviewed, calling it "a masterpiece of fiction whose fear actively surrounds its readers, while the novel speaks to all situations where injustice occurs and compels its audience to act. " Felecia Willington Radel of USA Today gave the novel four stars out of four, praised the portrayal of injustice and hopefulness in the novel, and particularly praised the sibling relationship between Robert and Gloria.

Writing for Locus, Alex Brown praised the novel for its setting. Brown states that when "people write about the history and legacy of slavery in the South, they often talk about Georgia, Mississippi, Alabama, Louisiana, and the Carolinas. Florida, not so much. My ancestors were enslaved in Florida, and the state holds a lot of importance to this day in my family, so Due’s Gracetown stories have always appealed to me on a personal level." Brown concludes that the novel "is peak Tananarive Due. If you like your horror with strong social commentary and deep connections to real history, you need this novel." Also writing for Locus, Paula Guran states that "nothing is more horrific than real life," speaking of the book's atrocities which are based on historical events. Guran calls the novel a "must read", concluding that "The Reformatory resonates with today’s many injustices. Evil never exists only in a villain like Haddock, but in society as a whole. Due reminds us to recognize this and do something about it."

In a review for NPR, Gabino Iglesias writes that Due "delivers here a historical fiction narrative that manages to destroy readers with the ugliness of unabashed racism while also making every hero in the book Black and celebrating Black excellence..." Iglesias also praised the combination of the historical and the fantastical in the book's mixture of genres. Tobias Carroll of Reactor writes that the novel "feels suffused with a very contemporary urgency" despite its "1950s setting". Carroll praised the way in which all of the characters, including the spirits, had their own personal agendas which do not always align neatly. Carroll categorized the work as "a novel that functions on a number of different levels—and succeeds at them all."

== Awards ==
Year	Award	Category	Result	Ref.
2023	Booklist Editors' Choice	Adult Books	Selected	
2023	Bram Stoker Award	Novel	Won	
2023	Goodreads Choice Awards	Horror	Finalist–14th	
2023	Los Angeles Times Book Prize	Ray Bradbury Prize	Won	
2023	Shirley Jackson Award	Novel	Won	
2024	BCALA Literary Awards	Fiction	Honor	
2024	Chautauqua Prize	—	Won	
2024	Dragon Awards	Horror Novel	Nominated	
2024	Locus Award	Horror Novel	Finalist–4th	
2024	Mark Twain American Voice in Literature Award	—	Longlisted	
2024	RUSA CODES Reading List	Horror	Shortlisted	
2024	World Fantasy Award	Novel	Won	
