= Brandon Massey =

American writer (born 1973)

- Born: June 9, 1973 (age 53) Waukegan, Illinois, U.S.
- Occupation: Writer
- Genre: Thriller

Brandon Massey (born June 9, 1973) is an American writer of thriller fiction, specializing in the horror and suspense genres. He is the author of several published novels, short story collections, and is the editor of three anthologies. Massey lives with his family near Atlanta, Georgia. He is a winner of the Gold Pen Award for Best Thriller from the Black Writers Alliance.

== Early life ==
Massey was born in Waukegan, Illinois, and grew up in Zion, a suburb north of Chicago.

== Work ==
Many of Massey's works are set in and around Atlanta, Georgia and in the Deep South. His novels frequently incorporate elements of horror, suspense, and the supernatural. Massey's stories involve contemporary African-American life in both urban and southern gothic settings.

"I became addicted to that adrenaline rush that you get when you're watching a horror movie, or reading a chilling novel. And when I got serious about writing, I was drawn to create these kind of stories, to experience that rush and share it with others."

== Publishing ==
Several of Massey's earliest novels were published by Kensington Books under its Dafina imprint. His subsequent works have been published by Dark Corner Publishing, his own independent publishing company based in Atlanta.

== Bibliography ==
- Thunderland (1999)
- Dark Corner (2004)
- Dark Dreams (As Editor) (2004)
- Within the Shadows (2005)
- Dark Dreams II: Voices From the Other Side (As Editor) (2006)
- Twisted Tales (2006)
- The Other Brother (2006)
- Vicious (2006)
- Dark Dreams III: Whispers in the Night (As Editor) (2006)
- The Last Affair (2007) (written under the pen name Rachee)
- Don't Ever Tell (2008)
- The Ancestors (2009) (Collection of African-American horror short stories by Brandon Massey, Tananarive Due, and L.A. Banks)
- Covenant (2010)
- Darker The Night: Collection (2011)
- Darkness To Come (2013)
- In The Dark (2014)
- Frenzied (2017)
- Nana (2018)
- The Quiet Ones (2020)
- No Stone Unturned (2022)
- The Exes (2022)
- The Landlord (2023)
- Bad Influence (2024)
- Good Intentions (2025)
- Backwoods (2025)
