= The Living Blood =

2001 novel by Tananarive Due

- Book Cover for The Living Blood
- Author: Tananarive Due
- Language: English
- Series: African Immortals #2
- Genre: Science fiction, Horror
- Publisher: Pocket Books
- Publication date: 2001
- Publication place: United States
- Media type: Print (paperback)
- Preceded by: My Soul to Keep
- Followed by: Blood Colony

The Living Blood is a 2001 novel by writer Tananarive Due. It is the second book in Due's African Immortals series. It is preceded by My Soul to Keep (1997), and is followed by Blood Colony (2008). It won the American Book Award in 2002.
