= My Soul to Keep =

1997 novel by Tananarive Due

- Author: Tananarive Due
- Language: English
- Series: African Immortals #1
- Genre: Science Fiction, Horror
- Publisher: HarperCollins
- Publication date: 1997
- Publication place: United States
- Media type: Print (paperback)
- Pages: 346 pp
- ISBN: 978-0-06-018742-2
- Followed by: The Living Blood

My Soul to Keep is a 1997 novel by American writer Tananarive Due. It is the first book in Due's African Immortals series and was followed by The Living Blood (2001). The third book in the series, Blood Colony, was published in 2008.

== Summary ==
Jessica, a reporter, is in a happy marriage to David, a professor. After close friends and family begin dying around her, Jessica feels David is hiding something. David reveals that he is immortal and has been for centuries. Jessica's recent investigations into deaths at nursing homes revealed the death of his own daughter, Rosalie. The coinciding tragedies were David's attempts to keep his past lives hidden and protect Jessica.

== Adaptation ==
In 2004, it was announced that a film version of this book is in production with actor Blair Underwood.

== Reviews ==
- Joy R. Sewing, "'My Soul to Keep' satisfies after good scare", Houston Chronicle (1997)
- Review on DarkEcho by Paula Guran
- Nehanda Imara, "What Price Eternity?", Metroactive Books (1997)
