= Patricia Stephens Due =

Civil rights activist

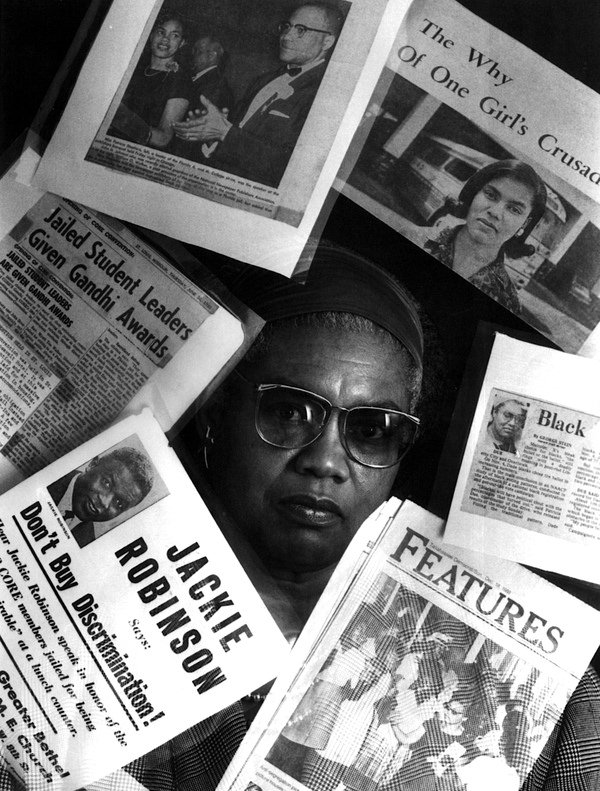
- Patricia Stephens Due with articles about her civil rights involvement, circa 2000
- Born: Patricia Stephens; December 9, 1939; Quincy, Florida, U.S.
- Died: February 7, 2012 (aged 72); Smyrna, Georgia, U.S.
- Occupation: Civil rights activist
- Known for: Tallahassee jail-in

Patricia Stephens Due (December 9, 1939 – February 7, 2012) was one of the leading African-American civil rights activists in her home state of Florida. Along with her sister Priscilla and others trained in nonviolent protest by CORE, Due spent 49 days in one of the nation's first jail-ins, refusing to pay a fine for sitting in a Woolworth's "White only" lunch counter in Tallahassee, Florida in 1960. Her eyes were damaged from tear gas used by police on students protesting such arrests, so she wore dark glasses for the rest of her life. She served in many leadership roles in CORE and the NAACP, fighting against segregated stores, buses, theaters, schools, restaurants, and hotels, protesting unjust laws, and leading one of the most dangerous voter registration efforts in the country in northern Florida in the 1960s.

With her daughter, Tananarive, Due wrote Freedom in the Family: a Mother-Daughter Memoir of the Fight for Civil Rights, documenting the struggle she participated in, initially as a student at Florida A&M University, and later working for civil rights organizations and Florida communities, sometimes in partnership with her husband, civil rights attorney John D. Due Jr.

== Early life and education ==
Patricia Stephens was born on December 9, 1939, in Quincy, Florida to Lottie Mae Powell and Horace Walter Stephens. Due's parents were both involved in civic activities. Stephens' stepfather was a high school civics teachers in the segregated Everglades Vocational High School, and Lottie registered people to vote and conducted petition drives. Patricia was the second of three children.

=== Florida A&M University (FAMU) ===
At Florida A&M University, Patricia Stephens Due's academic progress was disrupted because of her devotion to non-violent protest. Due enrolled at FAMU in 1957. Due to her many arrests and pressure from state authorities, Patricia was suspended from FAMU multiple times. While on campus, Patricia served as a CORE field secretary, overseeing voter registration drives across ten counties in North Florida. As a result of her involvement, more Black individuals registered to vote there than any other region in the South.

In 1963, after her jail-in, Patricia married John D. Due Jr., a FAMU law student who became a prominent civil rights attorney. The couple gained the nickname "Mr. and Mrs. Civil Rights" because of their commitment to advancing the well-being of Black Americans. They even spent their honeymoon participating in the 1963 March on Washington. The couple had three daughters: Tananarive, Johnita and Lydia.

After ten years from her initial enrollment, Patricia graduated from FAMU with a bachelor's degree in 1967. Decades later, the university honored her with an honorary Doctor of Humane Letters degree in 2006, recognizing her five decades of activism.

== Activism and organizational leadership ==
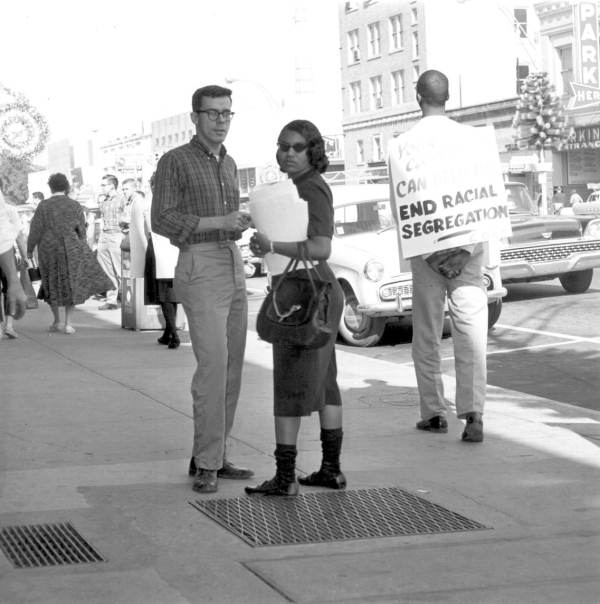
Patricia Stephens (in sunglasses) in a boycott and picketing of downtown stores: Tallahassee, Florida. December 1960.

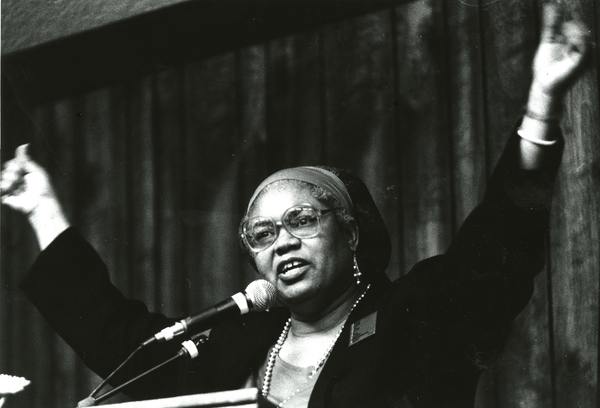
Patricia Stephens Due at the memorial service for Judy Benninger [Brown] in Gainesville, Florida, June 1991.

Due and her sister Priscilla started fighting segregation when Due was 13 by insisting on being served at the "WHITE" window of their local Dairy Queen (name of business: The Polar Bear) in Belle Glade, instead of the "COLORED" window.

=== Congress of Racial Equality (CORE) ===
During the summer of 1959, the sisters attended a nonviolent resistance workshop organized by the Congress of Racial Equality (CORE) in Miami. Following the Miami Interraction Action Institute workshop, Patricia and Priscilla Stephens co-founded the Tallahassee CORE chapter. The Stephens sisters had help from Daisy Young, the NAACP advisor on FAMU's campus. Young assisted the sisters by recruiting white students from Florida State University and allowing them to attend an Inter-Civic Council meeting to spread the word about CORE. On November 7, 1959, the eighteen active members of CORE completed their first project, testing the seating policy on city buses. After sitting at the front of the bus, they realized the Tallahassee bus boycott had been mostly successful. Patricia and other CORE members would complete several other projects, such as attempting to purchase interstate bus tickets in the whites-only waiting rooms of the Greyhound and Trailways bus stations, leading up to the Woolworth lunch counter sit-ins.

=== Woolworth Sit-ins ===
Patricia and other students affiliated with CORE, following the February 1, 1960 Greensboro lunch counter sit-ins, sat down at the Tallahassee Woolworth's variety counter on February 20, 1960. The students refused to leave, and all 11 students were charged with unlawful assembly and disturbing the peace by riotous conduct. A local minister, Rev. Daniel Speed, a leader of the Inter-Civic Council, later bailed out the students. Despite the arrests, the sit-ins continued. On March 12, 1960, twelve CORE members created an interracial sit-in, and were eventually arrested. Witnessing the arrest, Patricia helped organize 1000 students to march from the FAMU campus toward downtown Tallahassee, but were stopped by police officers with teargas. Due, who had been leading the marchers, experienced a police officer throwing tear gas in her face. As a result, she suffered permanent eye damage.

The twelve students arrested on February 20 were tried and found guilty on March 17, 1960, including Due. Eight refused to pay the $300 fine, deciding instead to go to jail. These students were the first in the country to accept a jail sentence rather than pay their fines. Those eight students served 49 days at the Leon County Jail: FAMU students Patricia and Priscilla Stephens, John Broxton, Barbara Broxton and William Larkins, and three other students—Clement Carney, Angelina Nance, and 16-year-old high school student Henry Marion Steele (son of activist pastor Rev. C.K. Steele).

The "jail-in" gained nationwide attention, and the students received a supportive telegram from Martin Luther King Jr. Due sent a letter to baseball pioneer Jackie Robinson, who published it in a column he wrote. Robinson later sent the jailed students diaries so they could write down their experiences. The correspondence between CORE officials and the Stephens sisters began to appear in the CORE-LATOR and in numerous black-owned newspapers in the North. After the jail-in, Due and the others were invited by Robinson to travel the country, participating in speaking tours to publicize the civil rights movement. She met with leaders such as Eleanor Roosevelt and author James Baldwin, and was jailed on numerous occasions as a leader in the movement.

=== Letter from Leon County ===
During Due's 49-day jail-in at Leon County jail, she wrote Letter from Leon County Jail which gained traction in the broader civil rights movement.This letter, smuggled out by visiting ministers, became one of the earliest public letters advocating for civil rights written from jail, predating Martin Luther King Jr.'s famous Letter from Birmingham Jail. In her correspondence, Due detailed her involvement in several Congress of Racial Equality (CORE)-sponsored events, including a practice sit-in at Woolworth's lunch counter, the February 20 sit-in at the same location, her arraignment, and the subsequent trial for the sit-in. The letter was not merely a recounting of events but also a call to action. Due implored readers to join the fight against segregation and racial injustice, emphasizing the moral imperative of advocacy for civil rights. The letter was published in 1962 in Freedom Ride, and later reprinted in a 1970 series titled, The Black Man and The Promise of America.

The letter gained significant attention nationally and contributed to the growing momentum of the civil rights movement. It highlighted the strategy of "Jail, No Bail," which CORE and other activists increasingly adopted as a tactic to draw attention to their cause. This approach involved refusing to pay fines for civil disobedience, opting instead to serve jail time as a form of protest against unjust laws.

== Death ==
Patricia Stephens Due died at age 72 in Smyrna, Georgia in 2012. Due died due to thyroid cancer.

== Bibliography ==
- Freedom in the Family: a Mother-Daughter Memoir of the Fight for Civil Rights with Tananarive Due (Ballantine, 2003)

== Honors ==
- Due received the Eleanor Roosevelt Award for Outstanding Leadership, the Gandhi Award for Outstanding Work in Human Relations, and the Florida Freedom Award from the NAACP. She was also awarded an honorary doctorate from her alma mater, Florida A&M University.
- In 2008, the National Hook-Up of Black Women Inc. honored Due at its national convention.
- In 2017, Due was inducted into the Florida Civil Rights Hall of Fame.

== Legacy ==
- In February 2010, Florida A&M University (FAMU) students gathered on campus to re-enact the sit-ins, jail-in, and protest march that had occurred 50 years previously in Tallahassee.
- The John Due and Patricia Stephens Due Freedom Endowed Scholarship provides $1000 annually to a FAMU student who plans to use the legacy of the civil rights movement to do his or her part to make a better nation.
- Patricia Due was honored by Tallahassee Mayor John R. Marks, who issued a proclamation declaring May 11, 2011 as Patricia Stephens Due Day.

== Interviews ==
- Patricia Stevens Due and Tananarive Due on NPR, Fresh Air from WHYY, January 16, 2003 (Audio)

== Works about Patricia Stephens Due ==
- Letter from Leon County Jail: Patricia Stephens Due and the Tallahassee, Florida Civil Rights Movement; Master's thesis by Marna Rinaldo Weston, June 2005, available through Florida State University theses listings.
