= The Vampire Huntress Legend Series =

- 12
- Author: Leslie Esdaile Banks (pen name: L.A. Banks)

The Vampire Huntress Legend Series (VHLS) is a twelve book series written by Leslie Esdaile Banks under the pen name L.A. Banks. The series centers around a twenty-something woman named Damali Richards, who is a spoken word artist but is also the Neteru, a human who is born once every thousand years to fight the Dark Realms. Her most dangerous and most constant enemy from the Dark Realms are vampires. The cover art for the series was done by Vince Natale, while some first editions contain inside illustrations by Eric Battle.

Originally a single book, the first book in the series was 750 pages. Her editor, her agent and Banks herself decided to cut the book's length by half. Her editor suggested making the series a trilogy, so Banks extended the story. They decided to do four books and complete the series, but her editor suggested keeping main character Carlos. Eventually it became a six-book contract, then nine, and finally ended at 12.

== Minion ==
The first book in the series, Minion, introduces Damali - a young twenty-year-old African American woman who is “Neteru” (the huntress). Damali is a very influential spoken word artist who writes and produces all her material (a lot of which is based on her own life experiences). Damali was orphaned at an early age and her experiences in foster care led her to escape, starting her journey as a vampire huntress. Damali's guardian team is introduced, consisting of Marlene, Nafes Shabazz, Big Mike, Jose, JL and Rider. Every member of the group possesses some sort of paranormal abilities.

Damali's team encounter an unusual breed of vampires, who differ from the "regular" ones in appearance and exude an odor so strong that it makes some of the team members physically sick. The protagonists eventually find out that these creatures are hybrids created by the evil vampire Fallon Nuit, who refers to them as "minions".

Carlos Rivera is a young Hispanic drug lord seeking vengeance for his murdered friends and family, unaware that he is being led into a trap by none other than Fallon Nuit who sees plenty of potential evil and wants him to join his cause as a vampire.

In order to save himself, Damali and the guardian team, Carlos forms an alliance with second highest council of the dark side.

== Complete series ==
=== The Vampire Huntress Legend Series (12 Book Series) ===
- Minion (Book 1) (2003)
  - Minion: Special Huntress Edition (mass market) (2004)
- The Awakening (Book 2) (2004)
- The Hunted (Book 3) (2004)
- The Bitten (Book 4) (2005)
- The Forbidden (Book 5) (2005)
- The Damned (Book 6) (2006)
- The Forsaken (Book 7) (2006)
- The Wicked (trade paperback) (Book 8) (February 2007)
- The Cursed (trade paperback) (Book 9) (July 2007)
- The Darkness (trade paperback) (Book 10) (February 2008)
- The Shadows (trade paperback) (Book 11) (July 2008)
- The Thirteenth (trade paperback) (Book 12) (February 2009)

The Darkness (10), The Shadows (11), and The Thirteenth (12) are known as The Armageddon Finale to The Vampire Huntress (trademark) Legend Series.

The first print, first edition copies of The Damned came with a limited poster illustrated by Eric Battle.

=== Anthologies ===
- “Make It Last Forever” In Stroke Of Midnight (2004)

(Rider and Tara's Story)

- “Ride the Night Wind” In Love at First Bite (2006)

(Jose Ciponte and Juanita DeJesus' Story)

== Other media ==
=== Official Website Content ===
Additional between the books chapters can be found in:

- Mass Market paperback copies of The Forsaken. - That First Kiss
- Some first edition copies of The Cursed - Between Man and Wife
- The Vampire Huntress Legend Series Sampler - Nothing Like the First Time (Prequel)
  - It was given away at large bookselling chains around the release of The Damned. In a December 2006 blog post, L.A. Banks referred to the VHLS sampler as a "little red sampler that came out last December", bringing its original release date into question as most sources list the release date as January 1, 2006.
- Atlantis Rising PDF - Released alongside The Thirteenth on the Publishers Website.
  - This chapter was written as a sort of parting between the books chapter by L.A. Banks as the series was ending. It takes place mid-chapter nine.
  - Download available on the Internet Archive: Atlantis Rising

=== Films ===
The first two books were optioned by Gotham Beach Entertainment and Griot Entertainment.

Jan Harrison of Moontide Pictures LLC ultimately ended up with the movie rights, going as far as writing a script for the movie and assuring fans that they'd be happy with the script.

=== Comics ===
Dynamite Entertainment is released a four part limited series which continues the Vampire Huntress stories during the post-armageddon. A four part graphic novel containing all four partas as well as concept sketches and an interview with the author where she implied that she was intending to make more comics.

- L.A. Banks' Vampire Huntress: Dawn and Darkness Book One: Ashes to Ashes
  - L.A. Banks' Vampire Huntress: Dawn and Darkness Book One: Ashes to Ashes (Virgin art cover)
  - L.A. Banks' Vampire Huntress: Dawn and Darkness Book One: Ashes to Ashes (Negative art cover - limited to 125 copies)
- L.A. Banks' Vampire Huntress: Dawn and Darkness Book Two: Dust to Dust
- L.A. Banks' Vampire Huntress: Dawn and Darkness Book Three: Bygones to Blood
- L.A. Banks' Vampire Huntress: Dawn and Darkness Book Four: Ride or Die
- L.A. Banks' Vampire Huntress: Dawn and Darkness Volume One (Four part graphic novel)

== Other ==
- Secret Desires
  - A a 347 page, special collector's edition of short vignettes that gathers together all the Between Books episodes in The Vampire Huntress Legends series, between book 5, The Forbidden, and before book 6, The Damned. Published via Cafepress in December 2005.
- Exotic Contraband: LA Banks' Vampire Huntress Legend Concept Art Book
  - Sold by The Devil's Candy Store at Comic Con 2008 (July 23–27. Only 250 signed, limited edition art books were made. Featuring art from more than 12 artists. Banks authorized the leftover copies to be sold on the Devil's Candy Store website.
