= Lovecraft Country (TV series) =

2020 American horror drama television series

- Genre: Black horror; Period drama; Supernatural horror; Science fiction
- Based on: Lovecraft Country by Matt Ruff
- Developed by: Misha Green
- Showrunner: Misha Green
- Starring: Jurnee Smollett; Jonathan Majors; Aunjanue Ellis; Courtney B. Vance; Wunmi Mosaku; Abbey Lee; Jamie Chung; Jada Harris; Michael K. Williams
- Music by: Laura Karpman and Raphael Saadiq
- Ending theme: "Sinnerman" by Alice Smith
- Country of origin: United States
- Original language: English
- No. of seasons: 1
- No. of episodes: 10

Production
- Executive producers: Misha Green; J. J. Abrams; Jordan Peele; Yann Demange; David Knoller (pilot); Bill Carraro; Ben Stephenson; Daniel Sackheim
- Producers: Christina Varotsis; Dana Robin
- Cinematography: Tat Radcliffe; Robert McLachlan; Michael Watson
- Editors: Marta Evry; Chris Wyatt; Joel T. Pashby; Bjørn T. Myrholt; Ian S. Tan; Sean Albertson; Paul Harb
- Camera setup: Single-camera
- Running time: 53–68 minutes
- Production companies: Afemme; Monkeypaw Productions; Bad Robot; Warner Bros. Television

Original release
- Network: HBO
- Release: August 16 – October 18, 2020

Lovecraft Country is an American Black horror historical fantasy drama television series developed by Misha Green based on and serving as a continuation of the 2016 novel by Matt Ruff. Starring Jurnee Smollett and Jonathan Majors, it premiered on August 16, 2020, on HBO. The series is produced by Monkeypaw Productions, Bad Robot, and Warner Bros. Television. The series is about a young Black man who travels across the segregated United States in the 1950s in search of his missing father, learning of dark secrets plaguing a town on which famous horror writer H. P. Lovecraft supposedly based the location of many of his fictional tales. In 2021, while a second season, Lovecraft Country: Supremacy, was in development, HBO cancelled the series.

== Premise ==
Lovecraft Country follows "Atticus Freeman as he joins up with his friend Letitia and his Uncle George to embark on a road trip across 1950s Jim Crow America in search of his missing father. This begins a struggle to survive and overcome both the racist terrors of white America and the terrifying monsters that could be ripped from a Lovecraft paperback".

The episodes "I Am." and "Jig-a-Bobo" establish that the Lovecraft Country novel exists in the continuity of the series as a novel written by George Freeman II, fictionalizing the events of the series which are retrieved from the future by his father, Atticus Freeman, in an attempt to change the story's narrative conclusion.

== Cast and characters ==
=== Main ===
- Jurnee Smollett as Letitia "Leti" Lewis, an old friend and love interest of Atticus, who is a skilled photographer
- Jonathan Majors as Atticus "Tic" Freeman, a young man who served in the Korean War. Majors also portrays George Freeman II, Tic's future son, in photographs.
- Aunjanue Ellis as Hippolyta Freeman, Atticus's aunt and a star-gazer with an itch for adventure
- Courtney B. Vance as George Freeman, Atticus's warm, funny and well-read uncle. Vance also portrays another George from an alternate timeline in "I Am.".
- Wunmi Mosaku as Ruby Baptiste, Leti's estranged older half-sister. Mosaku also portrays Christina Braithwhite having taken Ruby's form.
- Abbey Lee as Christina Braithwhite, the sole daughter of the leader of the secret society known as the Order of the Ancient Dawn
- Jamie Chung as Ji-Ah, a seemingly naïve Korean nursing student whom Atticus had an affair with. She is also possessed by a kumiho.
- Jada Harris as Diana Freeman, George and Hippolyta's daughter as well as Atticus's younger cousin and Montrose's niece
- Michael K. Williams as Montrose Freeman, Atticus's hard-headed and secretive father

=== Recurring ===
- Jordan Patrick Smith as William, Christina's former henchman and lover, whose form she assumes
- Joaquina Kalukango as Hanna, Atticus's slave ancestor, a former cleaning woman in Titus Braithwhite's mansion
- Jamie Neumann as Dell / Hillary, whose form Ruby assumes
- Erica Tazel as Dora Freeman, Atticus's mother, Montrose's wife and George's lover / sister-in-law
- Mac Brandt as Seamus Lancaster, an Order of the Ancient Dawn leader and Chicago police captain
- Deron J. Powell as Tree, a man who attended high school with Leti and Atticus
- Lucius Baston as Phil Hodges, the locksmith
- Regina Taylor as Hattie
- Rhyan Hill as Emmett "Bobo" Till
- Sibongile Mlambo as Tamara
- Jonathan Pawlowski as Burke

=== Guest ===
- Jamie Harris as Eustice Hunt, the sheriff of Devon County
- Demetrius Grosse as Marvin Baptiste, Leti's half-brother
- Tony Goldwyn as Samuel Braithwhite, the arrogant leader of a secret society
- Shangela as Lena Horne
- Monét X Change as Dinah Washington
- Darryl Stephens as Billie Holiday
- James Kyson as Byung-Ho
- Monique Candelaria as Yahima, two-spirit
- Matthew Alan as Deputy Eastchurch
- Michael Rose as Titus Braithwhite

== Episodes ==
No.	Title	Directed by	Teleplay by	Original release date	U.S. viewers (millions)
1	"Sundown"	Yann Demange	Misha Green	August 16, 2020	0.760
After arriving in Chicago, Korean War veteran Atticus Freeman discovers a letter from his missing father, Montrose, inviting him to discover his family legacy in Ardham, Massachusetts. Atticus, his uncle George (who writes a Green Book–style Black travel guide), and his friend Leti set off on a road trip to Devon County, Massachusetts. A group of murderous white men chase them out of the first town they stop in, but they escape thanks to the intervention of an unknown white woman, who somehow causes the mob's car to flip over. Soon after, they encounter the racist sheriff of Devon County, Eustice Hunt, who is eager to enforce the county's sundown law. Just after sunset, the sheriff's deputies force the travelers into the woods with the intent to lynch them, but the entire group is attacked by vicious monsters called shoggoths. Atticus, George and Leti fight their way out, while the police officers perish. The shoggoths are called away by a whistle. In the morning, the trio stumbles out of the woods to find an enormous mansion, where they are welcomed by a mysterious white man, William, who greets them warmly.
2	"Whitey's on the Moon"	Daniel Sackheim	Misha Green	August 23, 2020	0.867
William explains that the mansion is Ardham Lodge, designed by Titus Braithwhite, a slave trader and the founder of an occult secret society of wizards called the Sons of Adam. George realizes that Atticus is a descendant (through implied rape) of Titus and thus a premier member of the Sons. Because of this powerful heritage, Samuel Braithwhite, the current owner of the Lodge and leader of the Sons, plans to use – and potentially sacrifice – Atticus in an upcoming ritual. The white woman who helped the group earlier is revealed to be Samuel's daughter, Christina, who has a whistle that controls the monsters. After telling Atticus that not all white people are bad, she traps the travelers in their respective rooms with magic force fields. They eventually break out and rescue Montrose, who George had earlier deduced was being held captive in a nearby village. Samuel stops them, shooting and killing Leti and seriously wounding George. Atticus agrees to cooperate in the ritual to save their lives, but the magic backfires as a black woman in a 19th-century dress appears (implied to be Atticus's slave ancestor), turning Samuel and the other Sons to stone and burning down the mansion. Atticus escapes, only to discover that although Leti has been resurrected, George has succumbed to his wounds.
3	"Holy Ghost"	Daniel Sackheim	Misha Green	August 30, 2020	0.747
Three weeks after George's funeral, Leti uses an unexpected inheritance from her deceased mother to buy a dilapidated Victorian mansion in an all-white neighborhood on Chicago's North Side, filling it with black renters together with her half-sister Ruby. The white neighbors harass them and burn a cross on the lawn. A white supremacist police officer, Captain Lancaster, threatens Leti. Inside the house, supernatural activity flares up. Leti learns that the previous owner was a white scientist, Hiram Epstein. With the help of Lancaster, he kidnapped, experimented on, and killed eight black people before burying them under the house. All nine spirits are trapped there. With the help of a medium and the black spirits, Leti banishes Epstein's malevolent ghost. Later, Atticus finds Christina Braithwhite in Chicago; she survived the fire. Atticus has deduced that she was secretly the source of the "inheritance" and had steered Leti to the house. Christina explains that the house was built by Horatio Winthrop, a Sons of Adam member banished after stealing pages from The Book of Names in the 1800s, and that Epstein was a follower of Winthrop's. She asks Atticus to help her find the missing pages, which could help decipher "the language of Adam". Atticus attempts to shoot her, but he is not able to pull the trigger.
4	"A History of Violence"	Victoria Mahoney	Teleplay by : Misha Green; Story by : Wes Taylor	September 6, 2020 (Note: "A History of Violence" was released on September 4, 2020 on HBO's website.)	0.630
Montrose learns that Titus Braithwhite's pages from the Book of Names are stored in a vault in a museum in Boston where Braithwhite donated a wing dedicated to his career as an explorer. Montrose tries to hide this information from Tic, as he wants his son to stop pursuing magic, but he eventually relents and goes with Tic and Leti to the museum. They break into the vault after hours and find a desiccated corpse bent over the pages. When Tic tries to take them, the corpse reanimates into an Arawak Two-Spirit named Yahima. Yahima tells Tic that Braithwhite kidnapped them and locked them in the vault after they translated the pages for him. They agree to leave with the Chicago travelers, but the vault begins to flood, and the four barely escape. Upon returning to Chicago, Montrose murders Yahima to keep them from revealing more information about the pages. Meanwhile, Sheriff Lancaster and Christina vie over control of the Chicago Sons of Adam lodge, William seduces Ruby, and Hippolyta and Diana go in search of answers about George's death.
5	"Strange Case"	Cheryl Dunye	Misha Green and Jonathan I. Kidd & Sonya Winton-Odamtten	September 13, 2020	0.744
After sleeping with William, Ruby wakes up as a white woman and William reveals to her his metamorphosis potion. Montrose tells Atticus that he has taken care of Yahima and destroyed the pages, causing his son to nearly beat him to death. Leti tells Atticus that she is afraid of his anger, but the two later reconcile and have sex. Montrose goes to Sammy's apartment and has sex with him. As Tic works on deciphering the "Language of Adam" from Leti's photos, Leti warns him that the use of magic is inherently evil and will corrupt him. Ruby decides to keep using the potion for its privilege and gets a job as an associate manager at the department store under the name of Hillary. William tells her that she must perform a "favor" for Christina by planting a runic stone in Captain Lancaster's office. While doing so, she discovers an imprisoned man who has been tortured and learns that Captain Lancaster has a partially black body. Later, Ruby witnesses her white boss, Paul, attempt to sexually assault Tamara. After Christina tells Ruby to embrace power, Ruby rapes Paul with a stiletto heel. Ruby confronts William and asks what he and Christina do in the basement and William metamorphoses into Christina. As Atticus works on the language, he translates something that causes him to call his former lover, Ji-Ah, in South Korea.
6	"Meet Me in Daegu"	Helen Shaver	Misha Green and Kevin Lau	September 20, 2020	0.737
In 1949 South Korea, Ji-Ah studies to be a nurse and lives with her mother who demands she pick up men to have sex with. Ji-Ah brings home a man and kills him with her tentacle-like "Nine Tails" that project out of her body. It is revealed that Ji-Ah is possessed by a kumiho, the "Nine-tailed Fox" spirit and she must kill 100 men to be human again. Her stepfather was raping her, and her mother had a shaman send the kumiho to possess her daughter to kill him. In 1950, the Korean War begins and Ji-Ah works as a nurse. To smoke out a Communist spy, the Americans arrest the nurses and Atticus executes one of the nurses. Ji-Ah's friend Young-Ja reveals herself to be the spy. Ji-Ah decides to seduce Atticus with the intention of killing him, but falls in love with him instead. Ji-Ah believes she can control her "Tails", but while having sex with Atticus, her "tails" emerge and attack him. She has a vision of his future and tells him he will die if he returns to America. Atticus ends the relationship. Ji-Ah and her mother consult the shaman who tells them that many more will die.
7	"I Am."	Charlotte Sieling	Misha Green and Shannon Houston	September 27, 2020	0.755
Hippolyta visits the ruins of the Ardham Lodge and discovers that George had been there. She works out how to use the orrery and finds a key hidden within. Christina shows Ruby the corpse of William (who was killed by Lancaster) and Dell, and asks for her help. Leti and Atticus discover that they are both having dreams of Hanna (Atticus's slave ancestor) and deduce that she escaped with the Book of Names. Atticus discovers his father's homosexuality while Leti finds she is pregnant. Atticus goes to St. Louis to contact a relative and is told the Book of Names was lost in the Tulsa race massacre of 1921. Hippolyta goes to the Winthrop observatory and uses the key. Leti finds the orrery and tells Atticus where Hippolyta has gone. Atticus saves Hippolyta from two of Lancaster's policemen, but in the struggle, a portal to another dimension is opened. Atticus and Hippolyta both fall through. Hippolyta discovers she has the power to be whoever she wants. She befriends Josephine Baker in 1920s Paris, becomes a Dahomey Amazon, defeats a group of Confederate soldiers and meets George again, finally embracing her true identity as a "discoverer". Atticus returns from the other dimension.
8	"Jig-a-Bobo"	Misha Green	Misha Green and Ihuoma Ofordire	October 4, 2020	0.627
Atticus, Leti, Ruby, Montrose and Diana attend the memorial for Emmett Till (who was a friend of Diana's). Diana, distressed at being abandoned by Hippolyta, is stopped by Lancaster who demands she give him the orrery and when she refuses, he casts a spell that leads to two malevolent spirits, Topsy and Bopsy, to haunt her. Atticus gives Christina the key to the orrery / time machine in exchange for learning how to cast spells. Christina is planning to sacrifice Atticus at the fall equinox to be immortal. Ruby grows closer to Christina, but is hurt when she tells her that she does not care about Till's lynching. Ji-Ah arrives in Chicago but her presence angrily upsets Leti and causes the latter to disown Atticus. Montrose and Atticus reconcile. Atticus says he visited the future while at the Winthrop observatory and will have a son by Leti named George who will write the book Lovecraft Country. Leti trades the negatives of her photos in exchange for Christina casting a spell. Montrose and Atticus cast a spell to protect them, but nothing happens. Two men kill Christina in the same manner as Till and dump her corpse into Lake Michigan, but she revives. A suddenly more appreciative Ruby tells Leti of her relationship with William / Christina. Diana is attacked by Topsy and Bopsy and collapses. Lancaster attempts to enter Leti's house to find the orrery, but when he cannot, he and his policemen shoot up the house. A policeman tries to shoot Atticus, but a shoggoth appears who kills the policemen and tears off Lancaster's arm. Leti observes that Atticus's spell worked after all.
9	"Rewind 1921"	Jeffrey Nachmanoff	Misha Green & Jonathan I. Kidd & Sonya Winton-Odamtten	October 11, 2020	0.671
Hippolyta returns to Chicago to find Atticus, Leti and Montrose struggling to keep Diana alive after her being cursed by Lancaster. Ruby summons Christina, who uses Hippolyta's blood to "reset" the curse but warns that because Lancaster was the only one who knew the curse, it cannot be fully lifted. Christina visits and taunts a dying Lancaster and convinces Ruby to aid her in her quest for immortality, even after Ruby learns that the spell will kill Tic. The others decide to use Hiram's multiverse machine to travel back in time to 1921 Tulsa, where Tic's mother's family held the Book of Names before it was destroyed in the Tulsa race massacre. Upon arriving in 1921, Tic, Leti and Montrose witness a young Montrose being beaten by his father. The adult Montrose flees. Tic goes looking for Montrose and finds him watching his younger self rebuke a potential love interest of his (Thomas) due to him struggling with internalized homophobia and the external oppression at the time, before the pair of them, as well as young George and Dora, are set upon by a white mob, who succeed in killing Thomas. Tic comes to everyone else's rescue. Leti is saved from attackers by Tic's mother's family, who hide her in their house as it is attacked by another mob, and Leti convinces Tic's great-grandmother to hand over the Book of Names by promising to safeguard her family and their legacy. The trio flee the burning city and return to 1955 through the portal.
10	"Full Circle"	Nelson McCormick	Teleplay by : Misha Green; Story by : Misha Green & Ihuoma Ofordire	October 18, 2020	0.881
Letitia brings the book of names to the group. They open it and Tic and Letitia collapse. They enter an ancestral realm that looks like Tic's Mother's home surrounded by fire. Tic's Mother warns him he will have to be a hero and sacrifice himself. They are able to lift Diana's curse but her arm remains withered. Tic and Letitia go to Titus's vault and use the book of names to summon him. They take a piece of his flesh to use in a spell to bind Christina. Tic meets with Ji-ah, he apologizes and tells her he considers her family. Letitia asks Ruby to help them get a piece of Christina's body for the spell. The group travel to Ardham to try and stop Christina, enjoying a sing-a-long on the way. Christina's followers surround Tic and strap him to an altar. Letitia and Ruby are preparing the spell when Ruby is revealed to be Christina in disguise. They fight and Christina pushes Letitia from a tower. Christina performs the ceremony, covering herself in Tic's blood. Letitia tries to kill Christina to save him but thanks to the ceremony she is now immortal. Letitia tries to cast the binding spell but without a piece of Christina's body it doesn't work. Ji-Ah uses her tails to connect Tic and Christina. The binding spell works and Christina is bound from ever performing magic, along with all other white people. Tic dies from blood loss. Diana uses her new mechanical arm (courtesy of her mother) to victoriously murder Christina, who is trapped by rubble and finally helpless.

== Production ==
=== Development ===
On May 16, 2017, it was announced that HBO had given a series order to Lovecraft Country. Executive producers include Misha Green, Jordan Peele, J. J. Abrams, and Ben Stephenson. Additionally, Green serves as the series' showrunner and wrote the pilot episode. Production companies involved in the series include Monkeypaw Productions, Bad Robot, and Warner Bros. Television. It was reported that Peele originally brought the project to Bad Robot and enlisted Green to develop the show.

On March 5, 2018, it was announced that Yann Demange would direct and executive produce the pilot episode.

=== Casting ===
On April 26, 2018, it was announced that Jurnee Smollett had been cast as the series' female lead. On May 2, 2018, it was reported that Jonathan Majors had joined the main cast as the series' male lead. A day later, it was reported that Wunmi Mosaku had also been cast as a series regular. On June 19, 2018, it was announced that Aunjanue Ellis and Elizabeth Debicki had been cast as series regulars and that Courtney B. Vance had joined the series in a recurring capacity. On October 10, 2018, it was reported that Michael Kenneth Williams had been cast in a leading role. On June 14, 2019, it was reported that Abbey Lee had replaced Debicki in the role of Christina Braithwaite, while Jamie Chung and Jordan Patrick Smith had been cast in recurring roles. On June 20, 2019, it was announced that Jamie Neumann, Erica Tazel, and Mac Brandt had been cast in recurring capacities. In July 2019, Tony Goldwyn joined the cast.

=== Filming ===
Principal photography for the series began on July 16, 2018, in Chicago, Illinois. Filming also reportedly took place at the Chicago Cinespace Film Studios in Elburn, Illinois and White Pines State Park in Mount Morris, Illinois, at Blackhall Studios in Atlanta, Georgia and Macon, Georgia.

=== Music ===
Laura Karpman composed the music for the show. Due to the COVID-19 pandemic, Karpman and her composing team had to score the show individually from their residences in eastern Europe, with Karpman adding some music tracks of her playing piano, keyboards, and other instruments. Karpman reflected on how difficult it was composing the show with the pandemic's restrictions, due to not being able to have immediate interaction with the musicians. She felt satisfied with the finished result.

=== Cancellation ===
While a second season had yet to be officially greenlit for production, by February 2021, HBO's president of programming Casey Bloys announced that Misha Green had begun writing and was in early planning stages. On July 2, 2021, HBO announced that the series would not be returning for a second season. In James Andrew Miller's book Tinderbox: HBO's Ruthless Pursuit of New Frontiers, several writers of the show alleged that the cancellation was due to Green's creation of a hostile work environment.

== Release ==
Lovecraft Country premiered on August 16, 2020, on HBO and HBO Max, and consists of ten episodes.

=== Home media ===
The complete series was released on February 16, 2021, on Blu-ray and DVD.

== Reception ==
=== Critical response ===
Lovecraft Country has received positive reviews. On review aggregator website Rotten Tomatoes, the series holds an approval rating of 88% based on 367 reviews, with an average rating of 8.05/10. The site's critics consensus reads: "Anchored by Jurnee Smollett-Bell and Jonathan Majors' heroic performances, Misha Green's Lovecraft Country is a thrilling take on Lovecraftian lore that proves the Elder Gods aren't the only thing that goes bump in the cosmos." On Metacritic, the series has a weighted average score of 79 out of 100, based on 42 critics, indicating "generally favorable reviews".

Writing for The A.V. Club, Shannon Miller lauded the show's ability to balance Lovecraft's more problematic political views with "an appreciation for [his] unparalleled vision". Brian Tallerico of RogerEbert.com pointed to the show's use of genre storytelling "to peel back layers of American history to reveal the systemic problems underneath it", while also describing it as "marvelously entertaining". Hugo Rifkind of The Times described the show as "brutal and righteously furious". The Chicago Tribune's Michael Phillips, in reference to earlier, less successful attempts at adaptation of Lovecraft's works, said the show "succeeds where others have not" and commended the show on its themes, despite calling the five episodes available for early review "uneven". The New York Times's Mike Hale credited Green's "impressively seamless job... in wielding the cultural metaphors" as part of the show's strength. In a review for The Dispatch, Alec Dent praised the show's success at "examin[ing] racism in America's past through an unexpected genre", calling it a good reminder that "oftentimes true evil takes a normal guise". In a more critical review, Daniel D'Addario of Variety wrote that "the violence of Lovecraftian horror is so extreme [...] that even the most evil impulses of humanity seem an inadequate counterweight".

In an analysis of the series, Maya Phillips of The New York Times criticized it for "exploiting [the past] for the purposes of its convoluted fiction", despite a promising premise. She accused the show's creators of using historical events purely "to get points for relevance", notable examples of this being the funeral of Emmett Till and the Tulsa race massacre, both of which are featured in the show.

=== Awards and nominations ===
Year	Award	Category	Nominee(s)	Result	Ref.
2021	American Film Institute Awards	Top 10 TV Programs of the Year	Lovecraft Country	Won	
2021	Art Directors Guild Awards	Excellence in Production Design for a One-Hour Period or Fantasy Single-Camera Series	Kalina Ivanov (for "I Am")	Nominated	
2021	BET Awards	Best Actress	Jurnee Smollett	Nominated	
2021	Bram Stoker Award	Superior Achievement in a Screenplay	Misha Green (for "Sundown")	Nominated	
2021	Bram Stoker Award	Superior Achievement in a Screenplay	Misha Green and Ihuoma Ofordire (for "Jig-a-Bobo")	Nominated	
2021	British Academy Television Awards	Best International Programme	Lovecraft Country	Nominated	
2021	Cinema Audio Society Awards	Outstanding Achievement in Sound Mixing for Television Movie or Limited Series	Amanda Beggs, Marc Fishman, Mathew Waters, Brad Hacknell, Miguel Araujo and Brett Voss (for "Sundown")	Nominated	
2021	Costume Designers Guild Awards	Excellence in Period Television	Dayna Pink (for "I Am")	Nominated	
2021	Critics' Choice Super Awards	Best Actor in a Horror Series	Jonathan Majors	Nominated	
2021	Critics' Choice Super Awards	Best Actor in a Horror Series	Michael K. Williams	Nominated	
2021	Critics' Choice Super Awards	Best Actress in a Horror Series	Wunmi Mosaku	Nominated	
2021	Critics' Choice Super Awards	Best Actress in a Horror Series	Jurnee Smollett	Won	
2021	Critics' Choice Super Awards	Best Horror Series	Lovecraft Country	Won	
2021	Critics' Choice Super Awards	Best Villain in a Series	Abbey Lee	Nominated	
2021	Critics' Choice Television Awards	Best Actor in a Drama Series	Jonathan Majors	Nominated	
2021	Critics' Choice Television Awards	Best Actress in a Drama Series	Jurnee Smollett	Nominated	
2021	Critics' Choice Television Awards	Best Drama Series	Lovecraft Country	Nominated	
2021	Critics' Choice Television Awards	Best Supporting Actor in a Drama Series	Michael K. Williams	Won	
2021	Critics' Choice Television Awards	Best Supporting Actress in a Drama Series	Wunmi Mosaku	Nominated	
2021	Golden Globe Awards	Best Television Series – Drama	Lovecraft Country	Nominated	
2021	Hollywood Critics Association TV Awards	Best Actor in a Broadcast Network or Cable Series, Drama	Jonathan Majors	Nominated	
2021	Hollywood Critics Association TV Awards	Best Actress in a Broadcast Network or Cable Series, Drama	Jurnee Smollett	Nominated	
2021	Hollywood Critics Association TV Awards	Best Cable Series, Drama	Lovecraft Country	Nominated	
2021	Hollywood Critics Association TV Awards	Best Supporting Actor in a Broadcast Network or Cable Series, Drama	Courtney B. Vance	Nominated	
2021	Hollywood Critics Association TV Awards	Best Supporting Actor in a Broadcast Network or Cable Series, Drama	Michael K. Williams	Won	
2021	Hollywood Critics Association TV Awards	Best Supporting Actress in a Broadcast Network or Cable Series, Drama	Wunmi Mosaku	Nominated	
2021	Hollywood Music in Media Awards	Best Original Score in a TV Show/Limited Series	Laura Karpman and Raphael Saadiq	Nominated	
2021	Hollywood Music in Media Awards	Best Original Song in a TV Show/Limited Series	Laura Karpman, Raphael Saadiq and Janai Brugger (for "Tulsa, 1921 – Catch the Fire")	Nominated	
2021	Make-Up Artists and Hair Stylists Guild Awards	Best Special Make-Up Effects in a Television Series, Limited or Miniseries or New Media Series	Carey Jones and Heather Beauvais	Nominated	
2021	MTV Movie & TV Awards	Most Frightened Performance	Jurnee Smollett	Nominated	
2021	NAACP Image Awards	Outstanding Actor in a Drama Series	Jonathan Majors	Nominated	
2021	NAACP Image Awards	Outstanding Actress in a Drama Series	Jurnee Smollett	Nominated	
2021	NAACP Image Awards	Outstanding Directing in a Drama Series	Cheryl Dunye (for "Strange Case")	Nominated	
2021	NAACP Image Awards	Outstanding Directing in a Drama Series	Misha Green (for "Jig-a-Bobo")	Nominated	
2021	NAACP Image Awards	Outstanding Drama Series	Lovecraft Country	Nominated	
2021	NAACP Image Awards	Outstanding Guest Performance in a Comedy or Drama Series	Courtney B. Vance	Nominated	
2021	NAACP Image Awards	Outstanding Supporting Actor in a Drama Series	Michael K. Williams	Nominated	
2021	NAACP Image Awards	Outstanding Supporting Actress in a Drama Series	Aunjanue Ellis	Nominated	
2021	Primetime Emmy Awards	Outstanding Lead Actor in a Drama Series	Jonathan Majors (for "Sundown")	Nominated	
2021	Primetime Emmy Awards	Outstanding Lead Actress in a Drama Series	Jurnee Smollett (for "Holy Ghost")	Nominated	
2021	Primetime Emmy Awards	Outstanding Drama Series	Misha Green, J.J. Abrams, Jordan Peele, Bill Carraro, Yann Demange, Ben Stephenson, Rachel Rusch Rich, Jonathan I. Kidd, Sonya Winton-Odamtten, Matt King and Dana Robin	Nominated	
2021	Primetime Emmy Awards	Outstanding Supporting Actor in a Drama Series	Michael K. Williams (for "Rewind 1921")	Nominated	
2021	Primetime Emmy Awards	Outstanding Supporting Actress in a Drama Series	Aunjanue Ellis (for "I Am.")	Nominated	
2021	Primetime Emmy Awards	Outstanding Writing for a Drama Series	Misha Green (for "Sundown")	Nominated	
2021	Primetime Creative Arts Emmy Awards	Outstanding Casting for a Drama Series	Kim-Taylor Coleman and Meagan Lewis	Nominated	
2021	Primetime Creative Arts Emmy Awards	Outstanding Cinematography for a Single-Camera Series (One Hour)	Tat Radcliffe (for "Sundown")	Nominated	
2021	Primetime Creative Arts Emmy Awards	Outstanding Fantasy/Sci-Fi Costumes	Dayna Pink, Zachary Sheets and Terry Anderson (for "I Am.")	Nominated	
2021	Primetime Creative Arts Emmy Awards	Outstanding Guest Actor in a Drama Series	Courtney B. Vance (for "Whitey's on the Moon")	Won	
2021	Primetime Creative Arts Emmy Awards	Outstanding Prosthetic Makeup	J. Anthony Kosar and Anna Cali (for "Sundown")	Nominated	
2021	Primetime Creative Arts Emmy Awards	Outstanding Main Title Design	Patrick Clair, Raoul Marks and Ken Taylor	Nominated	
2021	Primetime Creative Arts Emmy Awards	Outstanding Music Composition for a Series (Original Dramatic Score)	Laura Karpman and Raphael Saadiq (for "Rewind 1921")	Nominated	
2021	Primetime Creative Arts Emmy Awards	Outstanding Music Supervision	Liza Richardson (for "Strange Case")	Nominated	
2021	Primetime Creative Arts Emmy Awards	Outstanding Sound Editing for a Comedy or Drama Series (One-Hour)	Tim Kimmel, John Matter, Paula Fairfield, Bradley Katona, Brett Voss, Jeff Lingle, Jason Lingle, Jeffrey Wilhoit and Dylan Tuomy-Wilhoit (for "Sundown")	Won	
2021	Primetime Creative Arts Emmy Awards	Outstanding Sound Mixing for a Comedy or Drama Series (One-Hour)	Marc Fishman, Mathew Waters and Amanda Beggs (for "Sundown")	Nominated	
2021	Primetime Creative Arts Emmy Awards	Outstanding Special Visual Effects in a Season or a Movie	Kevin Blank, Robin Griffin, Francois Dumoulin, Pietro Ponti, Grant Walker, J.D. Schwalm, Robert C. Rhodes, Kevin McCalister and Paige Prokop	Nominated	
2021	Primetime Creative Arts Emmy Awards	Outstanding Stunt Performance	Janeshia Adams-Ginyard (for "I Am.")	Nominated	
2021	Saturn Awards	Best Actor on Television	Jonathan Majors	Nominated	
2021	Saturn Awards	Best Horror Television Series	Lovecraft Country	Nominated	
2021	Screen Actors Guild Awards	Outstanding Performance by an Ensemble in a Drama Series	Jamie Chung, Aunjanue Ellis, Jada Harris, Abbey Lee, Jonathan Majors, Wunmi Mosaku, Jordan Patrick Smith, Jurnee Smollett and Michael K. Williams	Nominated	
2021	Screen Actors Guild Awards	Outstanding Performance by a Stunt Ensemble in a Comedy or Drama Series	Lovecraft Country	Nominated	
2021	Television Critics Association Awards	Outstanding Achievement in Drama	Lovecraft Country	Nominated	
2021	Visual Effects Society Awards	Outstanding Compositing in an Episode	Viktor Andersson, Linus Lindblom, Mattias Sandelius, Crawford Reilly (for "Strange Case"; Chrysalis)	Won	
2021	Visual Effects Society Awards	Outstanding Created Environment in an Episode, Commercial, or Real-Time Project	Patrice Poissant, Pauline Lavelle, Mohamed Abdou Elhakim, Alan Lam (for "Tulsa 1921")	Nominated	
2021	Visual Effects Society Awards	Outstanding Effects Simulations in an Episode, Commercial, or Real-Time Project	Federica Foresti, Johan Gabrielsson, Hugo Medda, Andreas Krieg (for "Strange Case"; Chrysalis)	Won	
2021	Visual Effects Society Awards	Outstanding Visual Effects in a Photoreal Episode	Kevin Blank, Robin Griffin, Pietro Ponti, Francois Dumoulin (for "Jig-a-Bobo")	Nominated	
2021	Women Film Critics Circle	Outstanding Series	Lovecraft Country	Won	
2021	Writers Guild of America Awards	New Series	Misha Green, Shannon Houston, Jonathan Kidd, Kevin Lau, Ihuoma Ofordire, Wes Taylor and Sonya Winton	Nominated	
