= Sonya Winton-Odamtten =

American professor, writer and television personality

Sonya Winton-Odamtten is an American playwright, executive producer, documentarian, professor, and television writer. She is for known her work as a writer on shows like NCIS New Orleans, The Whole Truth, Touch, and Oasis (Pilot), and as a co-executive producer of Lovecraft Country.

== Early life and education ==
Winton-Odamtten grew up in Los Angeles, California. She later earned her Bachelor of Arts with honors from Spelman College, majoring in political science. Subsequently, she received her Master's in Public Administration from Columbia University School of International and Public Affairs as well as a Master of Arts and a Master of Philosophy in African American studies and political science from Yale University. She later earned her doctorate in African-American studies and political science from Yale University.

== Theater ==
In 2001, Winton-Odamtten helped found the non-profit theater company Adam, Eve, & Steve Productions (AES) while at Yale. She directed and produced numerous theater productions and took a hiatus from her studies in 2003-2004 to complete the documentary Battleground for a New Generation.

== Career ==
Transitioning from academia and theater to television, Winton-Odamtten attended the Warner Brothers Television Writers Workshop in 2010.

In 2016, Winton-Odamtten NCIS New Orleans episode "Rock-a-Bye-Baby" was nominated for a GLAAD Award and, in 2021, she received an Emmy nomination for Outstanding Drama Series for Lovecraft Country.

In 2019, Winton-Odamtten signed an overall deal with HBO, continuing her work as a co-executive producers of the HBO series Lovecraft Country. She was a finalist for the Ray Bradbury Nebula Award for Dramatic Presentation in 2021, joined the Advisory Council of WarnerMedia Access Writers Program, joined the LA Theatre Works Board of Directors, and received a pilot order from HBO for their series adaptation of the novel Fledgling. She was also engaged in the development, writing, and executive producing the limited series Say Their Names.

== Philanthropy ==
Winton-Odamtten was involved in the initiative "Feed Black COVID-19 Health Workers Challenge". After partnering with Frontline Foods, she helped recruit over 40 other African-American Hollywood writers in order to support healthcare workers in underserved African-American communities around the country. The outreach helped to feed hospital, nursing home, and health clinic staffs in Downtown Los Angeles, St. Louis, New York, Dallas, Houston, Durham, Chicago, Pittsburgh, Providence, Inglewood, Boston, Memphis, and Minneapolis-St. Paul.

== Filmography ==
=== Television ===
Year	Show	Writer	Producer	Credit(s)	Episode(s)	Notes
2020	Lovecraft Country	Yes	Yes	Co-Executive Producer	"Strange Case"	Season 1, episode 5
2020	Lovecraft Country	Yes	Yes	Co-Executive Producer	"Rewind 1921"	Season 1, episode 9
2019	Treadstone	No	Yes	Supervising Producer	"The Berlin Proposal"	Season 1, episode 3
2019	Treadstone	No	Yes	Supervising Producer	"The Kwon Conspiracy"	Season 1, Episode 2
2019	Treadstone	No	Yes	Supervising Producer	"The Cicada Protocol"	Season 1, episode 1
2018	Trader	Yes	Yes	Executive Producer/ Creator		Sold to HBO (Undeveloped)
2017	Oasis	Yes	Yes	Co-Executive Producer	Mini Room	(Unreleased) Based on the film
2015	Wicked City	Yes	Yes	Co-Producer	"Blizzard of Ozz"	Season 1, episode 6
2015	NCIS New Orleans	Yes	No	Executive Story Editor	"Rock-a-Bye-Baby"	Season 1, episode 20
2015	NCIS New Orleans	Yes	No	Executive Story Editor	"La Carnaval De la Mort"	Season 1, episode 15
2014	NCIS New Orleans	Yes	No	Executive Story Editor	"Chasing Ghosts"	Season 1, Episode 9
2014	Killer Women	Yes	No		"In and Out"	Season 1, Episode 5
2013	The 4th Reich	Yes	Yes	Co-Executive Producer	Written on Spec "Pilot"	Sold to Showtime (Undeveloped)
2012	Touch	Yes	No	"Story By" Credit		Season 1
2011	Memphis Beat	Yes	No	"Written by"	"Body of Evidence"	Season 2, Episode 7
2010	The Whole Truth	No	No	"Story By" Credit	"The End"	Season 1, Episode 13
2010	The Whole Truth	Yes	No	"Written by"	"Perfect Witness"	Season 1, episode 10
2010	The Whole Truth	Yes	No	"Teleplay" Credit	"When Cougars Attack"	Season 1, Episode 5

=== Theater ===
Title	Playwright	Directed	Produced
"There Must Be A God Somewhere"	Jonathan I. Kidd	Yes	Yes - (Adam, Eve, and Steve Productions)
"Shaka"	Jan Henson Dow and Robert Schroeder	No	Yes - (Adam, Eve, and Steve Productions)
"Matri-focal Concentric Zones of Violence Revisited: Part One"	Sonya Winton-Odamtten	No	Yes - (Adam, Eve, and Steve Productions)

=== Acting ===
Year	Show	Role	Episode	Notes
1988	The Facts of Life	"Annie"	"On the Edge"	Season 9, episode 21
1987	227	"Carla Brown"	"Got a Job"	Season 2, episode 13
