= Leslie Esdaile Banks =

American writer

- Born: Leslie Ann Peterson; December 11, 1959; Philadelphia, Pennsylvania, U.S.
- Died: August 2, 2011 (aged 51); Philadelphia, Pennsylvania, U.S.
- Education: Wharton School of the University of Pennsylvania (Bachelor's degree); Temple University (Master's degree)
- Occupation: Writer
- Spouse(s): Michael Esdaile, Aldean Banks
- Children: 1
- Writing career
- Pen name: Leslie Esdaile, Leslie E. Banks, Leslie Banks, Leslie Esdaile Banks, L. A. Banks
- Language: English
- Period: 1996–2010
- Genres: African American literature, crime suspense, dark fantasy/horror, non-fiction, romance, women's fiction
- Notable awards: Essence Literary Awards Storyteller of the Year (2008); Best 50 Women in Business Award for the State of Pennsylvania (2008); Romantic Times Career Achievement Award for Paranormal Fiction (2009)
- Website: leslieesdailebanks.com

Leslie Ann Esdaile Banks (née Peterson; December 11, 1959 – August 2, 2011) was an American writer under the pen names of Leslie Esdaile, Leslie E. Banks, Leslie Banks, Leslie Esdaile Banks and L. A. Banks. She wrote in various genres, including African-American literature, romance, women's fiction, crime suspense, dark fantasy/horror, and non-fiction.

She won several literary awards, including the 2008 Essence Literary Awards Storyteller of the Year.

== Biography ==
Leslie Ann Peterson was born and raised in Philadelphia, Pennsylvania. She married Michael Esdaile,; they had one child, a daughter, Helena Esdaile. The couple divorced, and she remarried, to Al Banks, in 2000.

She attended the University of Pennsylvania Wharton School, where she earned her undergraduate degree, and then attended Temple University's School of Communications and Theater, earning her master's in fine arts. Before she began writing full-time, she worked at The Women's Opportunities Resource Center, where she helped develop micro-entrepreneurial career curriculums for women of low income in Philadelphia.

Banks contributed to magazines and newspaper columns, and wrote commercial fiction for five major publishers: St. Martin's Press (NYC), Simon & Schuster (NYC), Kensington Publishing (NYC), BET/Arabesque (NYC), and Genesis Press (MS). She became the New York Times and USA Today bestselling author, received the 2008 ESSENCE Magazine Storyteller of the Year award, as well as the 2009 Romantic Times Booklover's Convention Career Achievement Award for Paranormal Fiction. Books 1 and 2 of The Vampire Huntress Legend Series (Minion and The Awakening, respectively), have been optioned for Hollywood films by GothamBeach Entertainment and Griot Entertainment. Originally a nine-book series, The Vampire Huntress Legend Series has been expanded to twelve (the last being called "The Thirteenth").

In addition, Banks wrote the book series for the network cable series "Soul Food," as well as the novelization of the movie "Scarface."

== Illness and death ==
In June 2011, it was announced on Banks' website that she had been diagnosed with late-stage adrenal cancer. It was revealed that due to the extreme costs of her medical care, her family opened up a charitable fund in her name in one of the local Pennsylvania banks. The literary community also rallied around the ailing author, with several supporters starting a series of auctions where the proceeds went towards Banks' medical care. Authors including P. N. Elrod, Heather Graham and Charlaine Harris donated books and services to raise funds for Banks, as did others in the literary community.

Banks' official website was updated to reflect her death from cancer on August 2, 2011, at the age of 51. She is survived by her daughter, Helena Esdaile.

== Bibliography ==
=== As Leslie Esdaile ===
==== Romance novels ====
- Sundance (1996)
- Slow Burn (1997)
- Love Notes (2001)
- Love Lessons (2001)
- River of Souls (2001)
- Love Potions (2002)
- Still Waters Run Deep (2002)
- Tomorrow's Promise (2002)
- Through the Storm (2002)
- Sister Got Game (2004)
- Keepin' It Real (2005)
- Take Me There (2006)
- Better Than (June 2008)

==== Romance novellas ====
- "Home For The Holidays" in Midnight Clear (et al.) (2000) (*)
- "Time Enough for Love" in After the Vows (et al.) (2001) (*)
- "Valentine's Love" in Candlelight and You (et al.) (2003) (*)
- "Shameless" in Sisterhood of Shopaholics (et al.) (2003) (*)
- "A 'No Drama' Valentine's" in Valentin's Day Is Killing Me (et al.) (2006) (*)

==== Alexis Grant ====
Men of the Delta Force Series

- Sizzle & Burn
- Locked at Loaded

==== Non-fiction ====
- How to Write A Romance for The New Market (1999) (*)

=== As Leslie E. Banks ===
==== Drama, TV adaptation novels ====
- Soul Food: For Better, For Worse (October 1, 2002)
- Soul Food: Through Thick and Thin (March 1, 2003)
- Soul Food: No Mountain High Enough (September 30, 2003)

=== As Leslie Banks ===
==== Non-fiction ====
- "Light at the End of the Tunnel" in Chicken Soup for the African American Soul (2004) (*)

=== As Leslie Esdaile Banks ===
==== Crime and suspense ====
- Betrayal of the Trust (2004)
- Blind Trust (2005)
- Shattered Trust (2006)
- No Trust (final book) (2007)

=== As L. A. Banks ===
==== Crime and suspense ====
- Scarface, The Beginning, Volume 1 (2006)
- Scarface, Point of No Return, Volume 2 (TBD)

==== Paranormal ====
===== The Vampire Huntress Legend Series =====
1. Minion (trade paperback) (2003) (mass market) (2004)
2. The Awakening (trade paperback) (2004) (mass market) (2004)
3. The Hunted (trade paperback) (2004) (mass market) (2005)
4. The Bitten (trade paperback) (2005) (mass market) (2005)
5. The Forbidden (trade paperback) (2005) (mass market) (2006)
6. The Damned (trade paperback) (2006) (mass market) (2007)
7. The Forsaken (trade paperback) (2006) (mass market) (2007)
8. The Wicked (trade paperback) (2007) (mass market) (2008)
9. The Cursed (trade paperback) (2007) (mass market) (2008)
10. The Darkness (trade paperback) (2008) (mass market) (2008)
11. The Shadows (trade paperback) (2008) (Book 11) (2009)
12. The Thirteenth (trade paperback) (2009)

NOTE: The Darkness (10), The Shadows (11), and The Thirteenth (12) are called The Armageddon Finale to The Vampire Huntress Legend Series.

====== Vampire Huntress Graphic Novel Books ======
1. The Hidden Darkness #1 (2010)
2. The Hidden Darkness #2 (2010)
3. The Hidden Darkness #3 (2010)
4. The Hidden Darkness #4 (2010)

==== Neteru Academy ====
1. Shadow Walker: A Neteru Academy Novel (2010)

===== Betrayal of the Trust Books =====
1. Betrayal of the Trust (2004)
2. Blind Trust (2005)
3. Shattered Trust (2006)
4. No Trust (2007)

===== Crimson Moon novels =====
1. Bad Blood (2008)
2. Bite The Bullet (2008)
3. Undead on Arrival (2009)
4. Cursed to Death (2009)
5. Never Cry Werewolf (2010)
6. Left for Undead (2010)

===== Dark Avengers Series =====
1. Finders Keepers (2008)
2. Loser's Weepers (2008)

The Dark Series

1. Surrender the Dark (2011)
2. Conquer the Dark (2011)

===== Paranormal novellas =====
Anthology or collection	Contents	Publication date	Editor	Comments
Stroke of Midnight	Make It Last Forever	2004	Sherrilyn Kenyon Amanda Ashley L.A. Banks Lori Handeland	New York Times bestseller extended list 2004
Dark Dreams	If The Walls Could Talk	2004	Brandon Massey	
Death's Excellent Vacation	Seeing Is Believing	2010	Charlaine Harris Toni L. P. Kelner	
Voices from the Other Side: Dark Dreams 2	Natural Instinct	2006	Brandon Massey	
Love at First Bite	Ride the Night Wind	2006	et al.	
My Big Fat Supernatural Wedding	Spellbound	2006	P.N. Elrod	
Vegas Bites		2006	L.A. Banks, et al.	
Creepin'	Payback is a Bitch	2007	Monica Jackson	
Dark Delicacies 2	What the Devil Won't Take	2007	Del Howison Jeff Gelb	
On the Line		2007	Donna Hill Vincent Alexandria L.A. Banks	
Hotter Than Hell	Equinox	2008	Kim Harrison Martin H. Greenberg	
The Darker Mask		2008	Gary Phillips Christopher Chambers	
The Ancestors	Ev'ry Shut Eye Ain't Sleep	2008	L.A. Banks, Tananarive Due, and Brandon Massey	ISBN 978-0-7582-2382-1

== Articles ==
- Fiction Factor – Building Characters Through Realism
- Authors Supporting Authors Positively
