= The Good House (novel) =

Book by Tananarive Due

- Author: Tananarive Due
- Language: English
- Genre: Science fiction, horror
- Publisher: Atria Books
- Publication date: 2003
- Publication place: United States
- Media type: Print (paperback)
- Pages: 496
- ISBN: 978-0-7434-4901-4
- OCLC: 56076151

The Good House is a horror novel by American writer Tananarive Due, first published in 2003 by Atria Books. The story follows Angela Toussaint as she returns to her late grandmother's home in Sacajawea, Washington.

== Plot summary ==
The story is told out of chronological order; this plot summary reproduces the novel in chronological order for clarity.

Marie Toussaint is a practitioner of Vodún living in New Orleans in the early 20th century. She marries Philippe Toussaint and has a daughter named Dominique. After Philippe is lynched, she and Dominique and move to the rural town of Sacajawea, Washington. Marie becomes the common-law wife of pharmacist Elijah Good; when he dies three years later, she inherits his home. The locals refer to this manor as the Good House. Marie’s home is repeatedly attacked by racist townspeople. She attempts to summon an evil spirit for revenge. Her patron Papa Legba cautions against this. Marie defies Papa Legba, using a stolen word of power that belongs only to him. Marie accidentally awakens a bacá, an evil spirit which becomes determined to exterminate her family line. Due to her defiance, she loses the protection of Papa Legba.

When a local girl named Maddie becomes ill, her family comes to Marie for help. Marie concludes that the girl has been possessed by the bacá. She exorcises the spirit, which attaches itself to Dominique. Maddie is freed, but Dominique faces a life of mental illness. Years later, Dominique has a daughter, Angela (Angie), before taking her own life. Angie is raised by Marie in the Good House.

As an adult, Angie marries Tariq Hill and has a son, Corey. Marie dies while Corey is still a toddler, leaving the family disconnected from Marie's spiritual practices. By 2001, Angie and Tariq have separated. A teenage Corey reluctantly spends the summer in Sacajawea with his mother and father, who are attempting to repair their relationship.

Corey meets Sean Leahy, who becomes his best friend in Sacajawea. He also experiences racism from local citizens, including fellow teenager Beau Crier. Corey finds a manuscript from Grandmama Marie which contains advice on practicing magic. Corey attempts a summoning spell. This spell returns a long-lost ring which once belonged to Grandmama Marie. The spell also seems to attract an odd girl who calls herself Becca. Becca attempts to seduce Corey, but Sean cautions his friend against her. Corey realizes he has awakened the bacá. He attempts a cleansing ritual to restore Papa Legba’s word of power, but the effort is interrupted by Becca and Beau. Becca claims that Beau has raped her. Corey casts a curse that kills Beau. Becca vanishes, and Corey is horrified by what he has unleashed.

The next day, Angie and Tariq host an Independence Day party at the Good House. During the party, Corey returns Grandmama Marie’s ring to his mother. Minutes later, he dies by shooting himself in the head in the wine cellar. His death devastates the family.

Two years later, Angie is divorced and living in Los Angeles, where she works as a talent agent. She receives an offer from an investor to purchase the Good House. Angie's friend and client Naomi Price urges her to return before deciding whether or not to sell it. Angie and Naomi travel to Sacajawea. Angie reconnects with Myles Fisher, a high school boyfriend. During their visit, Naomi’s dog disappears, convincing her that something sinister lingers in the house. She leaves, warning Angie to do the same.

Meanwhile, Sacajawea is rocked by inexplicable acts of violence. Sean’s father dies by walking in front of a truck; the town's mayor murders his own son. In Los Angeles, Tariq experiences blackouts, drug binges, and violent mood swings as he becomes possessed by the bacá. Tariq murders Naomi and plans to kill Angie.

Angie realizes that the bacá is responsible for Corey’s death and the spreading violence. She consults Marie’s writings and embraces the spiritual traditions her grandmother once practiced. Tariq kills Myles and attacks Angie. Using the patterns on Grandmama Marie's ring, Angie casts a spell to return Papa Legba’s stolen word. With Papa Legba's help, she banishes the bacá. Marie sees a vision of Grandmama Marie, who tells Angie that she is being given a second chance.

Angie is sent back in time to before Corey's death. She changes the past so that Becca never seduces Corey. Angie decides to divorce Tariq and focus on raising her son.

== Reviews ==
- Horror Books: The Old Horror and the New Dark Fantasy By MARK ATHITAKIS, The New York Times, October 31, 2004
- Black Girl Nerds: The Good House by Tananarive Due
