= Casanegra (novel) =

Novel by Blair Underwood, Tananarive Due, and Steven Barnes

Casanegra: A Tennyson Hardwick Story
- Author: Blair Underwood, Tananarive Due, Steven Barnes
- Language: English
- Series: Tennyson Hardwick #1
- Genre: Mystery fiction
- Publisher: Atria Books
- Publication date: June 19, 2007
- Publication place: United States
- Media type: Print, ebook, audiobook
- Pages: 308 pp (1st ed hardcover)
- ISBN: 9780743287319
- OCLC: 77004238
- Dewey Decimal: 813/.6
- LC Class: PS3621.N383 C37 2007
- Followed by: In the Night of the Heat

Casanegra: A Tennyson Hardwick Story is a 2007 mystery novel by actor Blair Underwood and writers Tananarive Due and Steven Barnes. The book was released on June 19, 2007, through Atria Books and is the first book in the Tennyson Hardwick series. Casanegra follows the adventures of Tennyson Hardwick, an actor and former gigolo. A sequel, In the Night of the Heat, was released in 2009, followed by two more, From Cape Town with Love (2010) and South by Southeast (2012).

Underwood has expressed interest in filming an adaptation of Casanegra with himself potentially starring as the character of Tennyson Hardwick.

== Synopsis ==
Tennyson "Ten" Hardwick is an actor trying to make it big in Hollywood, which is made difficult by his past as a gigolo who sold his body to anyone willing to pay the right price. This past has caused a distance between Tennyson and his family, especially his LAPD captain of a father. However overcoming his past proves to be harder than he imagined after Tennyson finds himself the prime suspect for the murder of Afrodite, a rapper and former client of his.

== Development ==
Underwood came up with the book's concept after working on a project with Diana Ross that would have had the two acting as a client and her gigolo. The project never came to fruition, but Underwood continued to work on the concept until he approached Due with the idea of writing a novel based upon a gigolo. The first draft of Casanegra was written by Due and subsequent drafts were co-written with Underwood and Barnes. The team drew on Walter Mosley and Zane for some of the book's influences and included several recognizable Hollywood features such as the restaurant chain Roscoe's House of Chicken and Waffles and the African-American-owned bookstore Eso Won Books.

== Reception ==
Critical reception was mostly positive. Entertainment Weekly and Publishers Weekly both gave mostly positive reviews for Casanegra, with Publishers Weekly praising the book as a "seamlessly entertaining novel".
