= Tananarive Due =

American author and educator (born 1966)

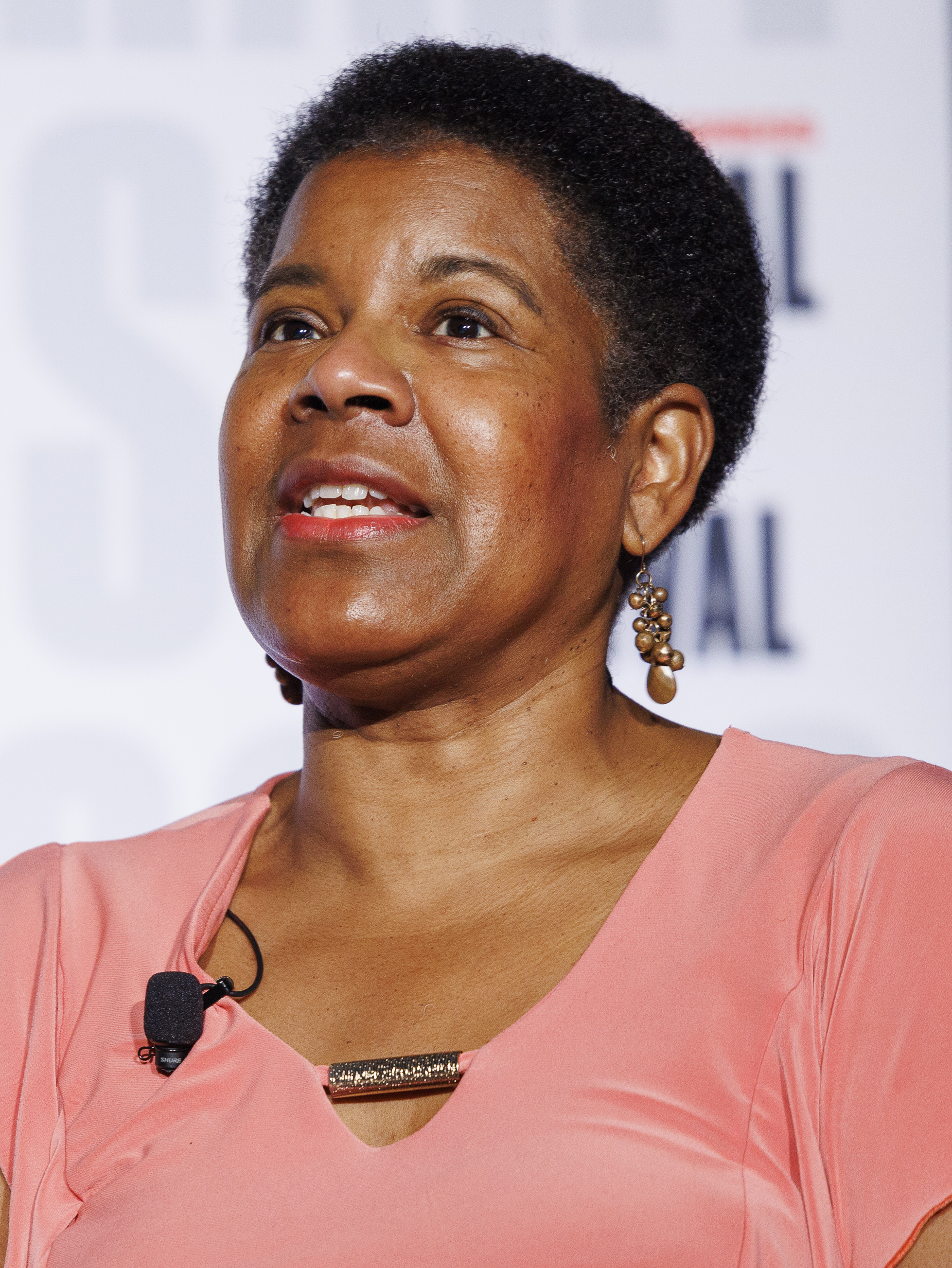
- Due at the 2023 National Book Festival
- Born: Tananarive Priscilla Due; January 5, 1966 (age 60); Tallahassee, Florida, United States
- Education: Medill School of Journalism (BS); University of Leeds (MA)
- Occupations: Writer; educator
- Spouse: Steven Barnes
- Writing career
- Notable work: The Reformatory (2023)
- Notable awards: American Book Award (2002); Bram Stoker Award (2023); Shirley Jackson Award (2023); Los Angeles Times Book Prize (2023)
- Movement: Afro-Surrealism
- Website: tananarivedue.com

Tananarive Priscilla Due (/təˈnænəriːv ˈdjuː/ tə-NAN-ə-reev DEW) (born January 5, 1966) is an American author and educator. She is also known as a film historian with expertise in Black horror. Due teaches a course at UCLA called "The Sunken Place: Racism, Survival and the Black Horror Aesthetic", which focuses on the Jordan Peele film Get Out.

== Early life and education ==
Due was born in Tallahassee, Florida, the oldest of three daughters of civil rights activist Patricia Stephens Due and civil rights lawyer John D. Due Jr. Her mother named her after the French name for Antananarivo, the capital of Madagascar.

Due earned a B.S. in journalism from Northwestern University's Medill School of Journalism and an M.A. in English literature, with a focus on Nigerian literature, from the University of Leeds. At Northwestern, she lived in the Communications Residential College.

== Career ==
Due was working as a journalist and columnist for the Miami Herald when she wrote her first novel, The Between, in 1995. This, like many of her subsequent books, was part of the supernatural genre. Due won the American Book Award for her novel The Living Blood (2001).

Due also wrote The Black Rose, a historical novel about Madam C. J. Walker (based in part on research conducted by Alex Haley before his death), and Freedom in the Family, a nonfiction work co-authored with Patricia Stephens Due about the civil rights movement. She contributed to the humor novel Naked Came the Manatee, a mystery thriller parody to which various Miami-area authors contributed chapters. Due also authored the African Immortals novel series and co-authored the Tennyson Hardwick novels with Blair Underwood and Steven Barnes.

Due was a member of the affiliate faculty in the creative writing MFA program at Antioch University Los Angeles and an endowed Cosby chair in the humanities at Spelman College in Atlanta.

She developed a course at UCLA called "The Sunken Place: Racism, Survival and the Black Horror Aesthetic" after the release of the 2017 film Get Out. The first course went viral and included a visit from Jordan Peele.

Due was featured in the 2019 documentary film Horror Noire: A History of Black Horror, produced by Shudder.

Her novel, The Reformatory, was published by Saga Press in 2023. It was nominated for numerous awards. It won the 2023 Bram Stoker Award, 2023 Shirley Jackson Award, 2023 Los Angeles Times Book Prize, and 2024 World Fantasy Award.

== Personal life ==
Due is the daughter of civil rights activists Patricia Stephens Due and civil rights attorney John D. Due Jr. She has two sisters, Johnita and Lydia.

Due is married to author Steven Barnes, whom she met in 1997 at a Clark Atlanta University panel on "The African-American Fantastic Imagination". The couple lives in Los Angeles with their son, Jason.

== Bibliography ==
=== Novels ===
- The Between (1995)
- The Black Rose (2000)
- The Good House (2003)
- Joplin's Ghost (2005)
- The Ancestors (with L.A. Banks and Brandon Massey, 2008)
- Devil's Wake (with Steven Barnes, 2012)
- Domino Falls (with Steven Barnes, 2013)
- The Reformatory (2023)
- Mazywood (2026)

==== African Immortals series ====
- My Soul to Keep (1997)
- The Living Blood (2001)
- Blood Colony (2008)
- My Soul to Take (2011)

==== The Tennyson Hardwick novels ====
- Casanegra (with Blair Underwood and Steven Barnes, 2007)
- In the Night of the Heat (with Blair Underwood and Steven Barnes, 2008)
- From Cape Town with Love (with Blair Underwood and Steven Barnes, 2010)
- South by Southeast (with Blair Underwood and Steven Barnes, 2012)

=== Short story collections ===
- Ghost Summer: Stories (2015)
- The Wishing Pool and Other Stories (2023)

=== Graphic novels ===
- The Keeper (with Steven Barnes, illustrated by Marco Finnegan, 2022)

=== Other books ===
- Naked Came the Manatee (as contributor, 1996)
- Freedom in the Family: A Mother-Daughter Memoir of the Fight for Civil Rights (with Patricia Stephens Due, 2003)
- Black Panther: Sins of the King (with Steven Barnes, Geoffrey Thorne, Mohale Mashigo, and Ira Madison III, 2024)

=== Short stories ===
- "Like Daughter", Dark Matter: A Century of Speculative Fiction from the African Diaspora (2000)
- "Patient Zero", The Year's Best Science Fiction: Eighteenth Annual Collection (2001)
- "Trial Day", Mojo: Conjure Stories (2003)
- "Aftermoon", Dark Matter: Reading the Bones (2004)
- "Senora Suerte", The Magazine of Fantasy & Science Fiction (2006)
- "Enhancement", Whose Future Is It?: Cellarius Stories, Volume I (2018)

== Awards and recognition ==
| Year | Work | Award | Category | Result | Ref. |
|---|---|---|---|---|---|
| 1995 | The Between | Bram Stoker Award | First Novel | Nominated | |
| 1997 | My Soul to Keep | Bram Stoker Award | Novel | Nominated | |
| 2001 | The Living Blood | International Horror Guild Award | Novel | Nominated | |
| 2002 | The Living Blood | American Book Award | — | Won | |
| 2003 | The Good House | International Horror Guild Award | Novel | Nominated | |
| 2009 | "Ghost Summer" | Carl Brandon Award | Kindred Award | Won | |
| 2009 | In the Night of the Heat | NAACP Image Award | Fiction | Won (Note: With Steven Barnes and Blair Underwood) | |
| 2015 | "Herd Immunity" | Theodore Sturgeon Memorial Award | — | Finalist | |
| 2016 | Ghost Summer: Stories | British Fantasy Award | Collection | Won | |
| 2016 | Ghost Summer: Stories | NAACP Image Award | Fiction | Nominated | |
| 2020 | —N/a | Ignyte Award | Ember Award | Finalist | |
| 2020 | "Black Horror Rising" | Ignyte Award | Creative Nonfiction | Won | |
| 2021 | —N/a | Ignyte Award | Ember Award | Finalist | |
| 2022 | —N/a | Ignyte Award | Ember Award | Won | |
| 2023 | Africa Risen | Locus Award | Anthology | Won (Note: The award was jointly awarded to all authors included in the anthology.) | |
| 2023 | "Incident at Bear Creek Lodge" | Locus Award | Novelette | Finalist | |
| 2023 | "Incident at Bear Creek Lodge" | World Fantasy Award | Short Fiction | Won | |
| 2023 | The Keeper (Note: Co-authored with Steven Barnes; illustrated by Marco Finnegan) | Locus Award | Illustrated and Art Book | Finalist | |
| 2023 | The Keeper | NAACP Image Award | Fiction | Nominated | |
| 2023 | "Rumpus Room" | Bram Stoker Award | Long Fiction | Nominated | |
| 2023 | The Reformatory | Booklist Editors' Choice | Genre Fiction | Selected | |
| 2023 | The Reformatory | Bram Stoker Award | Novel | Won | |
| 2023 | The Reformatory | Goodreads Choice Awards | Horror | Nominated | |
| 2023 | The Reformatory | Los Angeles Times Book Prize | Ray Bradbury Prize | Won | |
| 2023 | The Reformatory | Shirley Jackson Award | Novel | Won | |
| 2024 | The Reformatory | BCALA Literary Awards | Fiction | Honor | |
| 2024 | The Reformatory | Chautauqua Prize | — | Won | |
| 2024 | The Reformatory | Dragon Awards | Horror Novel | Nominated | |
| 2024 | The Reformatory | Locus Award | Horror Novel | Finalist | |
| 2024 | The Reformatory | Mark Twain American Voice in Literature Award | — | Longlisted | |
| 2024 | The Reformatory | RUSA CODES Reading List | Horror | Shortlisted | |
| 2024 | The Reformatory | World Fantasy Award | Novel | Won | |
| 2024 | "Suppertime" | Locus Award | Short Story | Finalist | |
| 2024 | The Wishing Pool and Other Stories | Locus Award | Collection | Finalist | |
| 2025 | "A Stranger Knocks" | Ignyte Award | Novelette | Finalist | |
| 2025 | "A Stranger Knocks" | Locus Award | Novelette | Finalist | |

== See also ==
- List of horror fiction writers
