= List of writing genres =

Writing genres (more commonly known as literary genres) are categories that distinguish literature (including works of prose, poetry, drama, hybrid forms, etc.) based on some set of stylistic criteria. Sharing literary conventions, they typically consist of similarities in theme/topic, style, tropes, and storytelling devices; common settings and character types; and/or formulaic patterns of character interactions and events, and an overall predictable form.

A literary genre may fall under either one of two categories: (a) a work of fiction, involving non-factual descriptions and events invented by the author; or (b) a work of nonfiction, in which descriptions and events are understood to be factual. In literature, a work of fiction can refer to a flash narrative, short story, novella, and novel, the latter being the longest form of literary prose. Every work of fiction falls into a literary subgenre, each with its own style, tone, and storytelling devices.

Furthermore, these genres are formed by shared literary conventions that change over time as new genres emerge while others fade. Accordingly, they are often defined by the cultural expectations and needs of a particular historical and cultural moment or place.

According to Alastair Fowler, the following elements can define genres: organizational features (chapters, acts, scenes, stanzas); length; mood; style; the reader's role (e.g., in mystery works, readers are expected to interpret evidence); and the author's reason for writing (an epithalamion is a poem composed for marriage).

== History ==
Genres are formed by shared literary conventions that change over time as new genres emerge while others fade. As such, genres are not wholly fixed categories of writing; rather, their content evolves according to social and cultural contexts and contemporary questions of morals and norms.

The most enduring genres are those literary forms that were defined and performed by the Ancient Greeks; definitions sharpened by the proscriptions of modern civilization's earliest literary critics and rhetorical scholars, such as Plato, Aristotle, Socrates, Aeschylus, Aspasia, Euripides, and others. The prevailing genres of literary composition in Ancient Greece were all written and constructed to explore cultural, moral, or ethical questions; they were ultimately defined as the genres of epic, tragedy, and comedy. Aristotle's proscriptive analysis of tragedy, for example, as expressed in his Rhetoric and Poetics, saw it as having 6 parts (music, diction, plot, character, thought, and spectacle) working together in particular ways. Thus, Aristotle established one of the earliest delineations of the elements that define genre.

== Fiction genres ==
- By age
  - Children's: stories, books, magazines, and poems that are created for children.
  - Fratire: 21st-century fiction literature written for and marketed to young men in a politically incorrect and overtly masculine fashion.
  - Lad lit: Male-authored popular novels about young men and their emotional and personal lives (term used from the 1990s to the early 2010s)
  - Chick lit
  - New adult fiction: developing genre of fiction with protagonists in the 18–29 age bracket.
  - Young adult
- Battle royal
- Classic (or literary fiction): works with artistic/literary merit that are typically character-driven rather than plot-driven, following a character's inner story. They often include political criticism, social commentary, and reflections on humanity. These works are part of an accepted literary canon and widely taught in schools.
- Coming-of-age
  - Bildungsroman: works that focus on the psychological and moral growth of a character from youth into adulthood.
- Electronic literature: literary works where digital capabilities such as interactivity, multimodality or algorithmic text generation are used aesthetically.
- Encyclopedic
- Epic: a narrative defined by heroic or legendary adventures presented in a long format.
  - Epic poetry: narrative poetry about extraordinary feats occurring in a time before history, involving religious underpinnings and themes.
- Fabulation: A class composed mostly of 20th-century novels that are in a style similar to magical realism, and do not fit into the traditional categories of realism.
- Folklore (folktale)
  - Animal tale
  - Fable: short story that anthropomorphizes non-humans to illustrate a moral lesson
  - Fairy tale
  - Ghost story
  - Legend: story, sometimes of a national or folk hero, that has a basis in fact but also includes imaginative material
  - Myth: traditional narrative, often based in part on historical events, that reveals human behavior and natural phenomena by its symbolism; often pertaining to the actions of the gods.
  - Parable
  - Personal narrative
  - Urban legend
- Gaucho literature
- Generative literature: Computationally or mechanically generated literary works
- Historical: works that take place in the past—which can be real, imagined, or a combination. Many such works involve actual historical figures or historical events within historical settings.
  - Alternate history: fiction in which one or more historical events occur differently than how they transpired in reality. Example: The Man in the High Castle (1962).
  - Historical fantasy
  - Historical mystery
  - Historical romance
    - Regency romance
  - Nautical fiction
    - Pirate novel
- Metafiction (aka romantic irony in the context of Romantic literature): uses self-reference to draw attention to itself as a work of art while exposing the "truth" of a story.
  - Metaparody
- Nonsense
  - Nonsense verse
- Paranoid
- Pastoral
- Philosophical
- Pop culture: fiction written with the intention of being filled with references from other works and media. Stories in this genre focused solely on using pop culture references.
- Postmodern
- Realist: works that are set in a time and place that are true to life (i.e. that could actually happen in the real world), abiding by real-world laws of nature. They depict real people, places, and stories to be as truthful as possible.
  - Hysterical
- Religious or inspirational
  - Christian
  - Islamic
  - Theological: fiction that explores the theological ideas that shape attitudes towards religious expression.
  - Visionary
- Satire: usually fiction and less frequently in non-fiction, in which vices, follies, abuses, and shortcomings are held up to ridicule, with the intent of shaming individuals, corporations, government, or society itself into improvement.
  - Horatian
  - Juvenalian
  - Menippean
- Social and political fiction
  - Libertarian sci-fi
  - Social sci-fi
  - Political thriller
- Theatre-fiction
- Thriller (or suspense): typically dark and suspenseful plot-driven fiction involving a person or group facing imminent harm, and the attempts made to evade that harm. Thrillers regularly use plot twists, red herrings, and cliffhangers, and seldom include comedic elements.
  - Conspiracy
  - Erotic
  - Legal
  - Financial
  - Political
  - Psychological
  - Romantic suspense
  - Techno-thriller
- Urban: fiction set in an urban environment.
- Sports Fiction: literary genre revolving around athletic activities and sports.
- Fan Fiction: non-canon fiction written about other content or stories, usually written by different author.
- Western: works that follow cowboys, settlers, and outlaws exploring the American frontier and Old West, typically in the late-19th to early-20th century.
  - Florida
  - Northern
  - Space
  - Western romance
  - Weird West

=== Action and adventure ===
Action fiction and adventure fiction. The hero's journey is the most popular narrative structure of an adventure novel.

- Adventure fantasy
  - Heroic fantasy
  - Lost world
  - Sword-and-sandal
  - Sword-and-sorcery
  - Sword-and-soul
  - Wuxia
- Nautical
  - Pirate
- Robinsonade
- Spy: fiction involving espionage and establishment of modern intelligence agencies.
  - Spy-Fi: spy fiction that includes elements of science fiction.
- Subterranean
- Superhero
- Swashbuckler: fiction based on a time of swordsmen, pirates and ships, and other related ideas, usually full of action.
  - Picaresque

=== Comedy ===
Comedy (including comic novel, light poetry, and comedic journalism): usually a fiction full of fun, fancy, and excitement, meant to entertain and sometimes cause intended laughter; but can be contained in all genres.

- Burlesque
- Fantasy
- Comedy horror
- Conte
- Parody
  - Metaparody
- Sci-fi
- Surreal comedy
- Tall tale: humorous story with blatant exaggerations, such as swaggering heroes who do the impossible with nonchalance.
- Tragicomedy: a work containing elements of both comedy and tragedy.

=== Crime and mystery ===
Crime fiction (including crime comics) centers on a crime(s), how the criminal gets caught and serves time, and the repercussions of the crime

- Caper: fiction told from the point of view of the criminals rather than the investigator. Well-known writers in this genre include W. R. Burnett, John Boland, Peter O’Donnell, and Michael Crichton.
- Giallo
- Legal thriller
- Lesbian crime fiction
- Mystery: fiction that follows a crime (e.g., a murder, a disappearance) as it is committed, investigated, and solved, as well as providing clues and revealing information/secrets as the story unfolds.
  - Cozy mystery: mystery fiction that contain no sex, violence, or profanity. Well-known writers in this genre include Dorothy L. Sayers and Elizabeth Daly.
  - City mysteries
  - Detective: fiction that follows a detective or other investigator (professional, amateur, or retired) as they investigate or solve a mystery/crime. Detective novels generally begin with a mysterious incident (e.g., death). One of the most popular examples is the Sherlock Holmes stories; well-known detective novelists include Agatha Christie and Raymond Chandler.
    - Gong'an
    - Girl detective
    - Inverted detective story (aka howcatchem)
    - Occult detective
    - Hardboiled
    - Historical mystery
    - Locked-room mystery
    - Police procedural: mystery fiction that feature a protagonist who is a member of the police force. Well-known novelists in this genre include Ed McBain, P. D. James, and Bartholomew Gill.
    - Whodunit: mystery fiction that focuses on the puzzle regarding who committed the crime.
- Noir
  - Nordic noir
  - Tart Noir

=== Speculative fiction ===
==== Fantasy ====
Fantasy (including comics and magazines) is a speculative fiction that use imaginary characters set in fictional universes inspired by mythology and folklore, often including magical elements, magical creatures, or the supernatural. Examples: Alice’s Adventures in Wonderland (1885) and the Harry Potter books.

- Action-adventure
  - Heroic
  - Lost world
  - Subterranean
  - Sword-and-sandal
  - Sword-and-sorcery
  - Wuxia
- Contemporary
  - Occult detective fiction
  - Paranormal romance
  - Urban
- Cozy
- Dark
- Fairytale
- Fantastique
- Fantasy comedy
  - Bangsian
- Fantasy of manners
- Gaslamp
- Gothic
- Grimdark
- Hard
- High
- Historical
- Isekai
- Juvenile
- Low
- Magic realism: works that depict the real world, but with magical elements that are considered normal in the world in which the story takes place.
- Mythic: fiction that is rooted in, inspired by, or that in some way draws from the tropes, themes, and symbolism of myth, legend, folklore, and fairy tales.
  - Mythopoeia: fiction in which characters from religious mythology, traditional myths, folklore, and/or history are recast into a re-imagined realm created by the author.
  - Mythpunk
- Romantic
- Science: science fiction based in elements of fantasy.
  - Dying Earth
  - Planetary romance
  - Sword and planet
- Shenmo
- Superhero
- Supernatural
- Weird fiction
  - New weird
- Weird West
- Xenofiction

==== Horror ====
Horror (including comics and magazines) involves fiction in which plot and characters are tools that elicit a feeling of dread and terror, as well as events that often evoke fear in both the characters and the reader. Horrors generally focus on themes of death, demons, evil spirits, and the afterlife.

- Body (aka biological): intentionally showcases grotesque or psychologically disturbing violations of the human body (including organ transplantation). Example: Frankenstein (1818).
- Comedy
  - Zombie comedy
- Erotic (sometimes monster erotica)
  - Ero guro
- Ghost stories and ghostlore
- Gothic (aka gothic romanticism; and dark romanticism): fiction mixing themes of horror, romance, and death
  - American
  - Southern
  - Southern Ontario
  - Space
  - Suburban
  - Tasmanian
  - Urban
- Japanese
- Korean
- Lovecraftian (or Cosmic)
- Monster literature
  - Jiangshi fiction
  - Werewolf fiction
  - Vampire literature
- Psychological
- Splatterpunk
- Techno
- Weird fiction
- Weird menace
- Weird West
- Zombie apocalypse

==== Science fiction ====
Science fiction (including comics, magazines, novels, and short stories) is speculative fiction with imagined elements that are inspired by natural sciences (physics, chemistry, astronomy, etc.) or social sciences (psychology, anthropology, sociology, etc.). Common elements of this genre include time travel, space exploration, and futuristic societies. (Sci-fi was originally regarded as scientific romance.)

- Apocalyptic and post-apocalyptic
- Afrofuturism
  - Africanfuturism
- Christian
- Comedy
- Utopian and dystopian
  - Dystopian: fiction set in a society that the author views as being worse than the one in which they live in at the time of writing. Example: Brave New World (1932) and Fahrenheit 451 (1952).
    - Cyberpunk: juxtaposes advanced technology with less-advanced, broken down society. Derivatives of cyberpunk include:
      - Biopunk
      - Dieselpunk
      - Japanese cyberpunk
      - Nanopunk
      - Solarpunk
      - Steampunk: blends technology with steam-powered machinery.
  - Utopian: (often satirical) fiction set in a utopia; a community or society that possesses highly desirable or perfect qualities.
- Feminist
- Gothic
- Isekai
- Hard
  - Climate fiction
  - Parallel world
- Libertarian
- Mecha
  - Mecha anime and manga
- Military
- Soft
  - Anthropological
  - Social
- Space opera: fiction that takes place in outer space and centers around conflict, romance, and adventure.
- Space Western: fiction that blends elements of sci-fi with those of the western genre.
- Spy-Fi: spy fiction that includes elements of science fiction
- Subterranean
- Tech noir
- Techno-thriller

==== Science fantasy ====
Science Fantasy or Sci-Fan, is a hybrid genre within speculative fiction that simultaneously draws upon or combines tropes and elements from both science fiction and fantasy. In a conventional science fiction story, the world is presented as being scientifically logical, while a conventional fantasy story contains mostly supernatural and artistic elements that disregard the scientific laws of the real world. The world of science fantasy, however, is laid out to be scientifically logical and often supplied with hard science-like explanations of any supernatural elements.

- Science fantasy: sci-fi inspired by mythology and folklore, often including elements of magic.
  - Dying Earth
  - Planetary romance
  - Sword and planet

==== Superhero ====
Superhero is a subgenre of speculative fiction examining the adventures, personalities and ethics of costumed crime fighters known as superheroes, who often possess superhuman powers and battle similarly powered criminals known as supervillains. The genre primarily falls between hard fantasy and soft science fiction in the spectrum of scientific realism. It is most commonly associated with American comic books, though it has expanded into other media through adaptations and original works.

- Superhero
  - Heroic fantasy
  - Cape punk
  - Heroic noir

=== Romance ===
Romantic fiction primarily focuses on a love story between two people, usually with an optimistic, emotionally satisfying ending. Also Romance (literary fiction) – works that frequently, but not exclusively, takes the form of the historical romance.

- Amish
- Chivalric
  - Fantasy: One example is The Princess Bride.
- Contemporary
  - Gay
  - Lesbian
  - Medical
- Erotic
  - Thriller
- Romantic fantasy
- Historical
  - Regency
- Inspirational: combines explicitly Christian themes with the development of a romantic relationship.
- Paranormal
  - Time-travel
- Romantic suspense
- Western
- Young Adult

== Nonfiction genres ==
- Academic
  - Literature review: a summary and careful comparison of previous academic work published on a specific topic
  - Monograph: a specialist book on one topic
  - Research article or research paper
  - Scientific: scholarly publication reporting original empirical and theoretical work in the natural or social sciences.
  - Technical report
  - Textbook: authoritative and detailed factual description of a thing
  - Thesis (or dissertation): a document submitted in support of candidature for an academic degree or professional qualification presenting the author's research and findings.
- Bibliography: an organized listing of books or writings
  - Annotated bibliography: a bibliography that provides a summary for each of its entries.
- Biography: a written narrative of a person's life; an autobiography is a self-written biography.
  - Diary
  - Memoir: a biographical account of a particular event or period in a person's life (rather than their whole life) drawn from personal knowledge or special sources (such as the spouse of the subject).
  - Misery literature
  - Slave narrative
    - Contemporary
    - Neo
- Catalogue raisonné
- Consilia: medieval practical medical textbook
- Cookbook: a kitchen reference containing recipes.
- Compendium / Body of knowledge
- Creative nonfiction: factual narrative presented in the form of a story so as to entertain the reader.
  - Personal narrative: a prose relating personal experience and opinion to a factual narrative.
- Essay: a short literary composition, often reflecting the author's outlook or point of view.
  - Position paper
- Journalistic writing: reporting on news and current events
  - Arts
  - Business
  - Data-driven
  - Entertainment
  - Environmental
  - Fashion
  - Global
  - Medical
  - Political
  - Science
  - Sports
  - Technical
  - Trade
  - Video games
  - World
- Non-fiction novel
- Reference work: publication that one can refer to for confirmed facts, such as a dictionary, thesaurus, encyclopedia, almanac, or atlas.
- Self-help: a work written with information intended to instruct or guide readers on solving personal problems.
- Obituary
- Travel: literature containing elements of the outdoors, nature, adventure, and traveling.
  - Guide book: book of information about a place, designed for the use of visitors or tourists
  - Travel blog
- True crime

== Literary fiction vs. genre fiction ==
Literary fiction is a term that distinguishes certain fictional works that possess commonly held qualities to readers outside genre fiction. Literary fiction is any fiction that attempts to engage with one or more truths or questions, hence relevant to a broad scope of humanity as a form of expression. Genre fiction is fiction written to appeal to fans of a specific genre. There are many sources that help readers find and define literary fiction and genre fiction.

- Academic novel (aka campus novel)
  - School story
  - Varsity novel
- Adventure fiction
- Bestiary
  - Medieval bestiaries
- Echtra – pre-Christian Old Irish literature about a hero's adventures in the Otherworld or with otherworldly beings.
  - Lost world
  - Nautical fiction
  - Picaresque novel – depicts the adventures of a roguish, but "appealing hero", of low social class, who lives by his wits in a corrupt society.
  - Robinsonade – a "castaway narrative".
  - Subterranean fiction
- Apocalyptic literature – details the authors' visions of the end times as revealed by an angel or other heavenly messenger.
- Bildungsroman – "coming of age" story. The German word "Bildung" can mean both "education" and "self-development."
- Crime fiction
  - Campus murder mystery
- Historical fiction
  - Biographical novel
  - Historical romance
  - Historical mystery
  - Neo-slave narrative
  - Plantation tradition
  - Regency novel
- Literary nonsense
  - Nonsense verse
- Mathematical fiction
- Nonfiction novel
- Novel of manners
  - Regency romance
- Occupational fiction
  - Legal thriller
  - Musical fiction
  - Sports fiction
- Romance novel
  - Medical romance
- Political fiction
- Sad girl fiction, noted in the 2020s
- Speculative fiction
  - Science fiction
    - Quantum fiction
  - Prehistoric fiction
- Travel literature
  - Immram – Old Irish tales concerning a hero's sea journey to the Otherworld
  - Milesian tale – a travelogue told from memory by a narrator who every now and then relates how he encountered other characters who told him stories that he incorporated into the main tale.
- Religious fiction
  - Christian fiction
    - Christian science fiction
    - Contemporary Christian fiction
  - Islamic fiction
  - Jewish fiction
- Saga
  - Family saga
- Speculative fiction
  - Fantasy
    - By setting
      - Epic / high fantasy
      - Hard fantasy
      - Historical fantasy
        - Prehistoric fantasy
        - Medieval fantasy
        - Wuxia
      - Low fantasy
      - Urban fantasy
        - Paranormal romance
    - By theme
      - Comic fantasy
      - Contemporary fantasy
      - Dark fantasy
      - Fantasy of manners
      - Heroic fantasy
      - Magic realism
      - Mythic
      - Paranormal fantasy
      - Shenmo fantasy
      - Superhero fantasy
      - Sword and sorcery
  - Horror
    - Body horror
      - Splatterpunk
    - Erotic
    - Gothic fiction
      - Southern Gothic
    - Psychological
    - Supernatural / paranormal
      - Cosmic (Lovecraftian)
      - Ghost story
      - Monster literature
        - Jiangshi fiction
        - Vampire fiction
        - Werewolf fiction
      - Occult detective
  - Science fiction
    - Alien invasion
    - Post-apocalyptic
    - Cyberpunk derivatives
      - Cyberpunk
        - Biopunk
        - Nanopunk
        - Postcyberpunk
      - Steampunk
        - Atompunk
        - Clockpunk
        - Dieselpunk
    - Solarpunk, aka Hopepunk
    - Dystopian
    - Hard science fiction
    - Military science fiction
    - Parallel universe, aka alternative universe
      - Alternative history
    - LitRPG
    - Scientific romance
    - Social science fiction
    - Soft science fiction
    - Space opera
    - portal fantasy aka Isekai and Accidental travel
  - Speculative cross-genre fiction
    - Bizarro fiction
    - Climate fiction (cli-fi)
    - Dying Earth
    - Science fantasy
      - Planetary romance
        - Sword and planet
    - Slipstream
    - Weird fiction
      - New Weird
- Suspense fiction
  - Crime fiction
  - Detective fiction
  - Gong'an fiction
  - Mystery fiction
- Thriller
  - Mystery fiction
  - Legal thriller
  - Medical thriller
  - Political thriller
    - Spy fiction
  - Psychological thriller
  - Techno-thriller
- Tragedy
  - Melodrama
- Urban fiction
- Westerns
- Women's fiction
  - Chick lit
  - Class S
  - Femslash
  - Matron literature
  - Romance novel
  - Yaoi
  - Yuri
- Workplace tell-all
- General cross-genre
  - Historical romance
  - Juvenile fantasy
  - LGBT pulp fiction
    - Gay male pulp fiction
    - Lesbian pulp fiction
    - Lesbian erotica fiction
  - Paranormal romance
  - Romantic fantasy
  - Tragicomedy
- Other
  - Dime novel

== Other nonfiction genres ==
These are genres belonging to the realm of nonfiction. Some genres listed may reappear throughout the list, indicating cross-genre status.

- Biography
  - Memoir
    - Autobiography
      - Slave narrative
      - Spiritual autobiography
    - Bildungsroman
      - Contemporary slave narrative
      - Neo-slave narrative
- Commentary
- Creative nonfiction
- Critique
  - Canonical criticism
  - Form criticism
  - Higher criticism
  - Historical criticism
  - Lower criticism
  - Narrative criticism
  - Postmodern criticism
  - Psychological criticism
  - Redaction criticism
  - Rhetorical criticism
  - Social criticism
  - Source criticism
  - Textual criticism
- Cult literature
- Diaries and journals
- Didactic
  - Dialectic
  - Rabbinic
  - Aporetic
  - Elenctic
- Dream vision
- Erotic literature
- Essay, treatise
- History
  - Genealogy
  - Narrative
  - People's history
  - Popular history
  - Official history
  - Narrative history
  - Whig history
- Lament
- Law
  - Ceremonial
  - Family
  - Levitical
  - Moral
  - Natural
  - Royal decree
  - Social
- Letter
- Manuscript
- Philosophy
  - Metaphysics
  - Socratic dialogue
- Poetry
  - Occasional poetry
- Polemic
- Religious text
  - Apocalyptic
  - Apologetics
  - Chant
  - Confession
  - Covenant
  - Creed
  - Daily devotional
  - Epistle
    - Pauline epistle
    - General epistle
    - Encyclical
  - Gospel
  - Homily
  - Koan
  - Lectionary
  - Liturgy
  - Mysticism
  - Occult literature
  - Prayer
  - Philosophy
    - Philosophical theology
    - Philosophy of religion
    - Religious epistemology
  - Prophecy
    - Blessing/Curse
    - Messianic prophecy
    - Divination
    - Oracle
      - Woe oracle
    - Prediction
    - Vision
  - Revelation
    - Natural revelation
    - Special revelation
  - Scripture
    - Buddhist texts
      - Lotus Sutra
      - Tripitaka
    - Christian literature
      - Apocrypha
      - Christian devotional literature
      - Christian tragedy
      - Encyclical
      - New Testament
      - Old Testament
      - Patristic
        - Ante-Nicene
        - Post-Nicene
      - Psalms
        - Imprecatory psalm
      - Pseudepigrapha
    - Hindu literature
      - Bhagavad Gita
      - Vedas
    - Islamic literature
      - Haddith
      - Quran
    - Jewish literature
      - Hebrew poetry
  - Song
    - Dirge
    - Hymn
  - Sutra
  - Theology
    - Apologetics
    - Biblical theology
    - Cosmology
    - Christology
    - Ecclesiology
    - Eschatology
    - Hamartiology
    - Pneumatology
    - Mariology
    - Natural theology
    - Soteriology
    - Theology proper
  - Wisdom literature
- Scientific writing
- Testament
- True crime
