= Fictional religion =

Fictional belief system

A "赤", the kanji figure for red, the symbol of Matrixism, a fictional religion

A fictional religion, hypothetical religion, imaginary religion or invented religion refers to a fictional belief system created for the purposes of literature, film, or video game. Fictional religions can be complex and inspired by or build on existing religions. Two of the better known and influential examples are the Cthulhu Mythos of H. P. Lovecraft and the religion of Middle Earth created by J. R. R. Tolkien.

Some fictional religions have gained real followers in the real world and some works of fiction have inspired new religious movements (for example, Matrixism); others have been intended from the beginning as parody religions (for example, the Church of the Flying Spaghetti Monster).

== In speculative fiction ==
Religious themes have long been a significant theme of fiction. One of those themes is that of a fictional religion: a fictional belief system created for the purposes of literature, film or games. Many fictional religions are found in the speculative fiction, in particular, in science fiction and fantasy genres. Sometimes, they are intended for satirical purposes, and at other times, they are "thoughtful extrapolations in the sociology of religion" or "earnest visions of better [religions]". Brian Stableford, referring to "hypothetical" or "imaginary" religions in science fiction, notes that their accounts "inevitably raise questions similar to those addressed by sociologists and psychologists of religion, sharpened by the dissatisfaction writers usually feel with regard to the imperfections of their own religious culture". Stableford suggests that the tradition of speculative fiction (or specifically, utopian fiction) designing "better religious cultures and organizations" can be traced at least to Thomas More's Utopia (1516). Stableford also suggests that "the most striking and memorable images of fictional religion" are those that are horrific or comic, noting for example that portrayal of theocracies in speculative fiction is usually negative and used to contrast such societies with liberal ones; the latter are usually more positively framed, citing the example of The Culture series by Iain M. Banks.

Religious themes have been often found in works of science fiction. In American science fiction, fictional religions were a trope that Stableford argues was introduced with some delay, as some writers, particularly in the early 20th century, did not want to offend the readers with themes that were considered morally suspect. By 1940s and 1950s this started to change, for example with Robert A. Heinlein's "If This Goes On—" (1940) and Sixth Column (1941), and Fritz Leiber's Gather, Darkness! (1943). Heinlein stories juxtapose "evil fake religion" against a "well-intentioned fake religion", while Leiber's story portrays a "virtuous fake Satanism as a remedy for an evil fake godliness". In some stories from that period, criticism of religion can be seen in stories in which humans use invented religion to influence (educate or control) more primitive alien societies (ex. L. Sprague de Camp's "Ultrasonic God", 1951 and Robert Silverberg and Randall Garrett's The Shrouded Planet, 1957). Bene Gesserit, a secretive organization from Frank Herbert's Dune (1965), have "planted myths and rituals in a variety of cultures, just in case a stranded Bene Gesserit would need to control them". The concept of fictional religions can also be found in non-American science fiction works; for example in Polish short story by Jacek Dukaj, "Crux", where formation of a new religion is shown, one mixing Christian themes with the Polish Sarmatism ideology.

In addition to fictional religions of the humans, some works discuss the concept of alien religions. Works featuring alien religions or institutions include, among others, George R.R. Martin's A Song for Lya (1974) and Dan Simmons' Hyperion (1989); alien missionaries visit Earth in, among others, David G. Compton's The Missionaries (1972). Some works feature religions in the context of "instrumentality of future tyranny", such as in James E. Gunn’s This Fortress World (1955). Others feature religions formed or evolved in the post-apocalyptic conditions (Walter M. Miller’s A Canticle for Leibowitz, 1960), or in settings of interstellar civilizations (Simmons' Hyperion, or Frank Herbert and Bill Ransom’s series that begun with The Jesus Incident, 1979) or featuring artificial intelligence (Clifford D. Simak’s Project Pope, 1981). Greg Egan’s ‘‘Oceanic’’ (1998) describes conflict between fictional future religious faiths in a posthuman context. Fremen from Frank Herbert's Dune practice "a future form of Islam". Kurt Vonnegut's Cat's Cradle (1963) features a humorous fictional religion, bokonism, and is often cited as a classic in the genre's satirical criticism of religion. Conversely, some fictional religions are sympathetic to real-life religions: the Star Wars cosmology has been read as coded Christian theology. Others are explicitly pro-religious: in some Christian science fiction, such as C.S. Lewis' Space Trilogy series beginning with Out of the Silent Planet (1938), the religious practices on Mars and Venus are invented, but dovetail into and endorse Christian belief. Orson Scott Card has criticized the science fiction genre for oversimplifying religion, which he claims is always negatively depicted as "ridiculous and false".

In fantasy novels, individual belief in a deity or deities is generally treated favorably. By contrast, the organized religions that are part of the fantasy world are often depicted as corrupt: for example "omnianism" in Terry Pratchett's Small Gods; other novels treating organized religion in this way include Ursula K. Le Guin's Earthsea series. Fantasy works that tie to the real world often portray known organized religions as power-hungry and lament the thinning of religious diversity, associated with the concept of the Golden Age (e.g. the fantasy works of Thomas Burnett Swann). Several fictional religions are featured in George R. R. Martin's A Song of Ice and Fire series (also known as the Game of Thrones series; 1996-) and represent an example of complex world building. The fictional post-Christian religion from Pratchett's Nation has been described as "complex and contradictory - as any real religion", and the use of fictional religion is said to "render the topic of religion more accessible (and perhaps less controversial)" to the reader, who is "encouraged to think about both the merits and the problematic dimensions of religion" in general, without being distracted by considering those issues in terms of real-world religions.

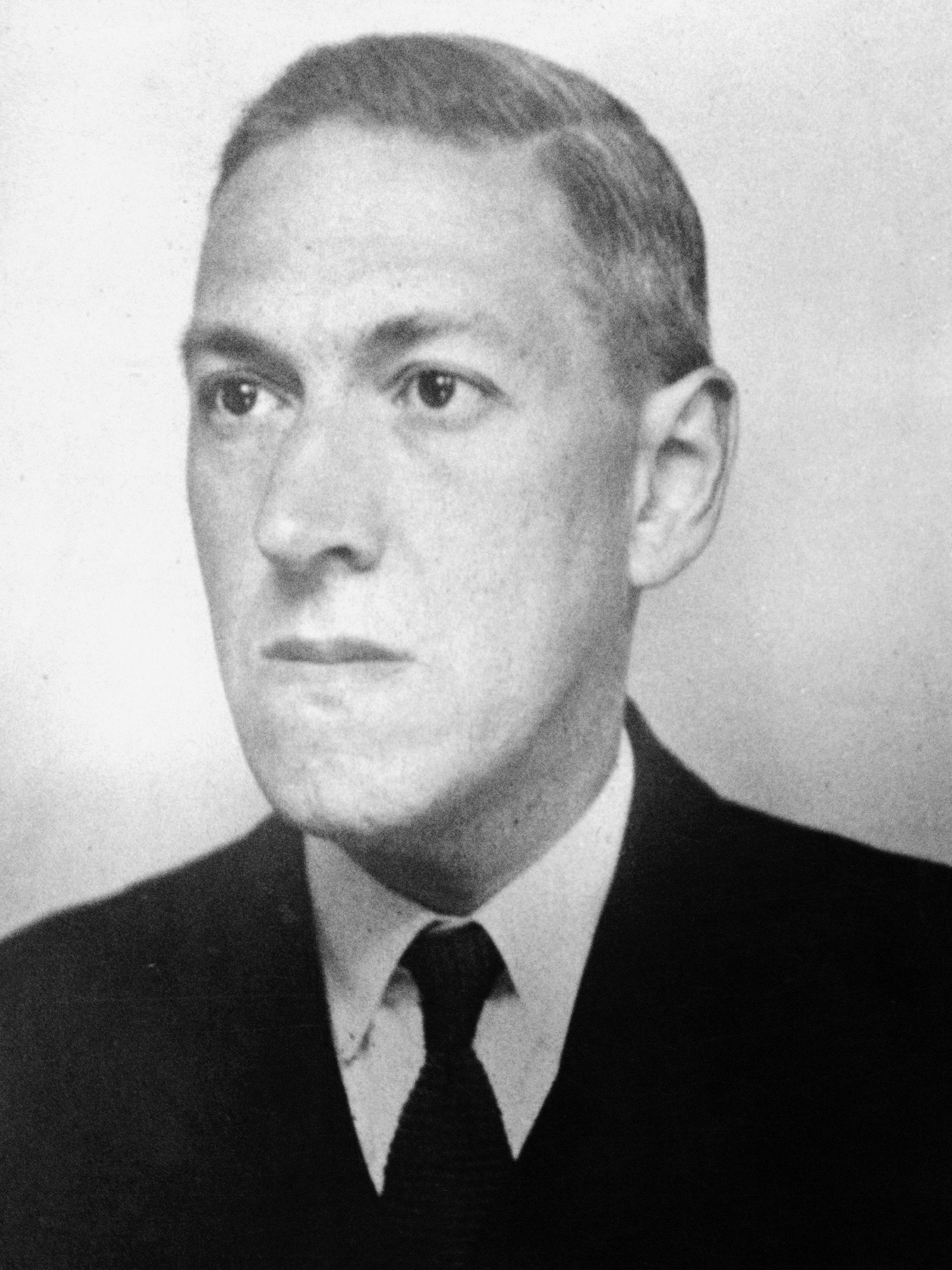
H. P. Lovecraft, the creator of the Cthulhu Mythos

Significantly associated with the horror genre, the Cthulhu Mythos of H. P. Lovecraft has been described as "something like the official fictional religion of fantasy, science fiction, and horror, a grab bag for writers in need of unthinkably vast, and unthinkably indifferent, eldritch entities".

Fictional religion can also be found in games, whether role-playing or video. M. A. R. Barker, a linguist and game designer (creator of the Tékumel setting), wrote an article Create a Religion In Your Spare Time for Fun and Profit (1980) which presented his detailed guidelines for the construction of fictional religion for games, effectively recommending that any fictional religion that is to be taken seriously by the readers (or players) has to be crafted with the "anthropologist's level of realism". Some fictional religions in role-playing games have been controversial due to accusations of encouraging occultism (see also: religious objections to Dungeons & Dragons). In video games, the portrayal of alien religions in the Mass Effect series (related to characters of Mordin Solus and Thane Krios) has been praised as "relatable and touching." Thane, in particular, has been praised for pioneering characterization as an openly religious video game character. It has been suggested that players' positive reception of Thane and his religion is related to the fact that they are clearly recognized as alien by players, which does not invite comment on real world religions and spirituality, whereas the same cannot be said of a more critically received character in the series, human Ashley William and her religiosity.

== In the real world ==
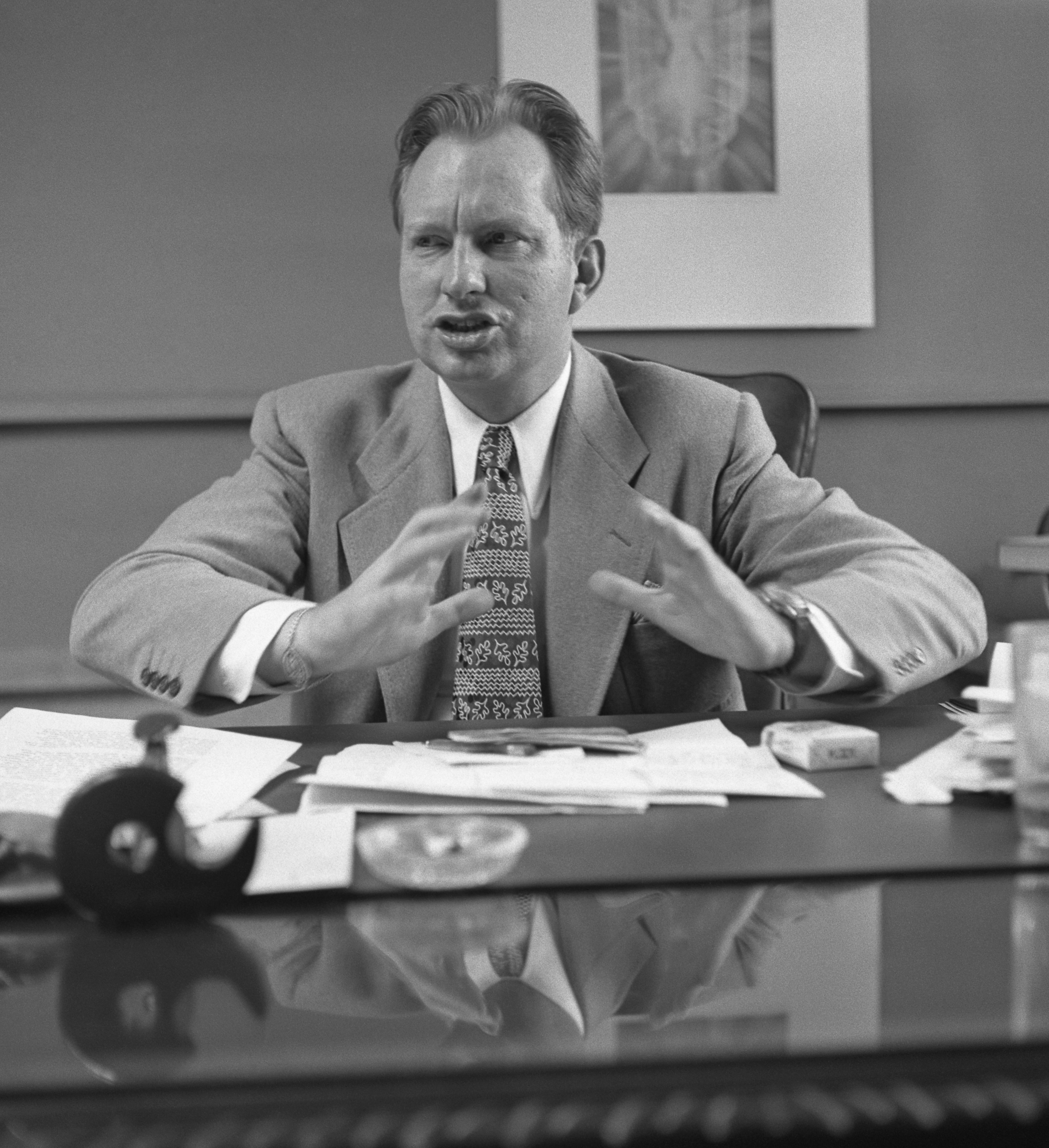
L. Ron Hubbard, founder of the Church of Scientology

Stableford notes that "thinkers and writers who could not set aside their own propensity for faith" created not just literary images, but real world new cults, of various popularity. Some existing religions (new religious movements) more or less openly announce their "invented" status, and a number of them have been inspired by works of fiction or pop culture, or even incorporate elements of published fiction; some of them have been also called "fiction-based religions" as well as "parody religions". The Church of Scientology mythology written by L. Ron Hubbard draws heavily on pulp SF tropes. Discordianism, founded in 1957, incorporates into its canon Robert Anton Wilson and Robert Shea’s Illuminatus! Trilogy. Founded in 1968, the Church of All Worlds' name is inspired by a fictional religion of the same name in the science fiction novel Stranger in a Strange Land (1961) by Robert A. Heinlein; the church's mythology includes science fiction to this day. The Church of the SubGenius, also commonly classified as a parody religion, celebrates several holidays in honor of characters from fiction and popular culture, such as Monty Python, Dracula, and Klaatu and its mythology is influenced by, among others, the Cthulhu Mythos of H. P. Lovecraft. Octavia E. Butler's fictional religion of Earthseed (introduced in the Parable of the Sower, 1993) has also led to some real-world new religious movements. Star Wars-inspired Jediism, emerging around 2001 and espousing "the values of the monastic, honour-bound and ethical Jedi Order", and Matrixism, founded in 2004 and inspired by Lana & Lilly Wachowski's The Matrix film series, are some of the most recent examples of this type of interaction between fiction and religion. As claimed by Carole Cusack: "Jediism and Matrixism embrace the notion that the values depicted in cinematic science fiction are more ‘real’ and provide a more meaningful basis for life than existing ‘real life’ religions".

== See also ==
- Culture jamming
- Devil in the arts and popular culture
- God game
- Hell in the arts and popular culture
- List of angels in fiction
- List of demons in fiction
- List of fictional deities
- List of fictional religions
- Inspirational fiction
- Paganism in Middle-earth
- Reincarnation in popular culture
- Religion in Futurama
- Religion in The Chronicles of Narnia
- Religious debates over the Harry Potter series
- Theological fiction
