= List of fictional religions =

Fictional religions are religions that exist only in works of fiction.

== B ==
- Bajoran religion (faith in the Prophets of Bajor) – Star Trek: Deep Space Nine
- Bene Gesserit – Dune novels by Frank Herbert
- Bokononism – Cat's Cradle by Kurt Vonnegut
- Brotherhood of Steel - Fallout.

== C ==
- Carpathianism– Left Behind series by Tim LaHaye
- The Chantry - Dragon Age
- Chaos Gods – Warhammer
- Children of the Cathedral - Fallout.
- Church of All Worlds – Stranger in a Strange Land by Robert A. Heinlein (Note: Inspired a real-life religious group of the same name.)
- Church of the Broken God – SCP Foundation
- Church of Humanity – Marvel Comics
- Church of the Papal Mainframe – Doctor Who
- Church of Science (aka Scientism) – in Foundation by Isaac Asimov
- Covenant Religion – Halo (Note: Also known as The Great Journey.)
- Cthulhu Mythos cults – in the works of H. P. Lovecraft
- Cult of Gozer – Ghostbusters
- Cult of Skaro – Doctor Who

== D ==
- Drowned God – A Song of Ice and Fire by George R. R. Martin

== E ==
- Earthseed – Parable of the Sower and Parable of the Talents by Octavia Butler
- Esoteric Order of Dagon – in the works of H. P. Lovecraft
- Eywa – Avatar

== F ==
- Faith of the Seven – A Song of Ice and Fire series by George R. R. Martin
- First Amalgamated Church – Futurama

== J ==
- Jediism – Star Wars

== H ==
- He Who Walks Behind the Rows – Children of the Corn by Stephen King

== L ==
- Lords of Kobol – Battlestar Galactica

== M ==
- Many-Faced God – A Song of Ice and Fire series by George R. R. Martin
- Meyerism – The Path
- Missionaria Protectiva (aka Panoplia Prophetica) – Dune novels by Frank Herbert
- Muad’Dib – Dune novels by Frank Herbert

== O ==
- Old Gods – A Song of Ice and Fire series by George R. R. Martin
- Oprahism – Futurama
- Orange Catholic Bible – Dune novels by Frank Herbert
- Order of Wen the Eternally Surprised (aka History Monks) – Discworld novels by Terry Pratchett

== Q ==
- Qun - Dragon Age.

== R ==
- R’hllor, the Lord of Light – A Song of Ice and Fire series by George R. R. Martin
- Robotology – Futurama

== S ==
- Siari – Mass Effect
- Shuten Order – Shuten Order

== U ==
- Unitology – Dead Space.

== Z ==
- Zensufi – Dune novels by Frank Herbert
- Zensunni – Dune novels by Frank Herbert

== See also ==
- Parody religion
- List of fictional clergy and religious figures
- List of fictional deities
- List of religions
