= Leigh Bale =

American novelist

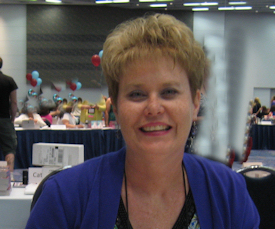
- Born: United States
- Education: University of Nevada, Reno (BA)
- Occupation: Novelist
- Spouse: Steven Bale (m. 1981)
- Writing career
- Period: 2006–present
- Genres: Romance, Contemporary, Inspirational, Historical
- Website: www.leighbale.com

Leigh Bale is an American author of historical, contemporary romance novels. She lives in Nevada with her professor husband. She is a Publishers Weekly Bestselling author.

== Biography ==
Leigh Bale was raised in small rural towns throughout the Western United States. Bale earned a Bachelor of Arts in history, graduating with honours from the University of Nevada-Reno. She is the daughter of a retired U.S. forest ranger and wrote her first novel using an electric typewriter, without formal plotting or structure. Bale writes in a variety of subgenres including contemporary romance, medieval romance, romantic suspense, and faith-based fiction. She has worked as a bookkeeper and administrative assistant.

Her stories have received recognition such as the Romance Writers of America Golden Heart Award (writing as Lora Bale) and the Gayle Wilson Award of Excellence. Recently, Bale has written a Forest Ranger series, a set of romantic stories centered around the life and work of a forest ranger. Her father is a conservationist rather than a preservationist and has served as her consultant for these books. Her contemporary books have received four star reviews from Romantic Times magazine. With a B.A. degree in history, Bale has also written romantic historical novels.

== Published works ==
=== Book list (as of June 21, 2018) ===
- The Healing Place – December 2007 (available in Hardcover & French)
- The Forever Family – August 2009 (reissued August 2018)
- The Road to Forgiveness – May 2010 (reissued October 2014)
- A Doctor for the Nanny – November 2015 (Lone Star Cowboy League – Series Book #2)

==== The Forest Rangers – Series ====
1. The Forest Ranger's Promise – May 2011 (available in hardcover)
2. The Forest Ranger's Child – June 2012
3. The Forest Ranger's Husband – November 2011
4. Falling for the Forest Ranger – January 2013
5. Healing the Forest Ranger – May 2013
6. The Forest Ranger's Return – February 2014
7. The Forest Ranger's Christmas – October 2014 – Publishers Weekly bestseller 10/7/14
8. The Forest Ranger's Rescue – March 2015

==== Men of Wildfire – Series ====
1. Her Firefighter Hero – May 2016
2. Wildfire Sweethearts – April 2017
3. Reunited by a Secret Child – April 2018

==== Colorado Amish Courtships – Series ====
1. Runaway Amish Bride – September 2018 – Publishers Weekly bestseller 8/31/18
2. His Amish Choice – November 2018

==== Romantic suspense – inspirational ====
- Broken Trust – December 2013 (ebook only)

==== Historical romance ====
- The Heart's Warrior – 2008 (reissued July 2013)
- My Heart Belongs to You – September 2014 (available in ebook & print copy)
- The Silken Cord – January 2013 (inspirational; ebook only)
- Medieval Romance Trilogy – October 2014 (ebook only)

== Personal information ==
Bale's daughter was diagnosed with an inoperable brain tumor at the young age of seven years. Bale's first published novel, The Healing Place, centers around a child suffering from an inoperable brain tumor. Previously titled When Angels Fall and written under the name of Lora Bale, The Healing Place won the Romance Writers of America Golden Heart for best inspirational in 2006 and was sold to one of the final round judges and published the following year by Harlequin Steeple Hill. While this book is a fictional story, Bale lived the research and the novel incorporates elements inspired by her family's experience during her daughter's illness.
