= Sparrow and Vine =

Romance novel by Sophie Lark

- Book cover
- Author: Sophie Lark
- Language: English
- Genre: Contemporary romance
- Pages: 400
- ISBN: 9781464242281

Sparrow and Vine is a contemporary romance novel by Sophie Lark. The book follows Sadie Sparrow, who enters a marriage of convenience with her rival Monroe Beaumont in order to inherit her family home and winery.

Although scheduled for release in April 2025, Sparrow and Vine was canceled by its publisher Bloom Books a month before publication after quotations from the book drew criticism on social media from early readers.

== Plot ==
According to Bloom Books, Sparrow and Vine was intended to be the first book in an "arranged marriage series about a woman who has to marry a man from a rival family in order for them to secure their portion of an inheritance."

The book follows Sadie Sparrow, who agrees to marry her domineering "worst enemy" Monroe Beaumont in order to inherit the family winery, Sparrow and Vine.

== Publication history ==
Sparrow and Vine was scheduled for publication by Bloom Books in April 2025. In March, readers with advance copies of the novel began to criticize it on social media, posting quotations from the book and giving it one-star reviews on Goodreads.

In one quotation, a character says "I don’t want to sound ignorant… But shouldn’t there be a crew of people with questionable work visas picking these grapes for us?", which some readers perceived as racist or insensitive to undocumented workers. In another quotation, a character says: "I was inspired by Elon Musk. I use his five step design process," which drew criticism due to Musk's association with Donald Trump and his work for the Department of Government Efficiency.

Following the controversy, Bloom announced that it would cancel the publication of Sparrow and Vine, as well as subsequent books in the series. Lark released an apology on Instagram, saying that she was pausing the series for rewrites "to ensure that my work doesn’t contribute to harm". According to Lark, Bloom editors had suggested removing the controversial lines, but she ultimately decided to keep them in the book. Lark also said that she had intended "to craft and demonstrate a flawed main character", but that "a lot in the world has changed" since she had written the book in summer 2024, "particularly in regard to the fate of immigrants worldwide and certain public figures."

== Reception ==
Sarah Barrett, discussing the Sparrow and Vine controversy for The Mary Sue, said that the quotations were "truly tone deaf", but that Lark's apology seemed "heartfelt".

In The New York Times, Alexandra Alter wrote that the controversy over Sparrow and Vine showed "how politics has infused almost every aspect of culture, even the often-escapist world of romance fiction." She added that the incident exemplified "the influence that readers can exert over authors and publishers, and how negative campaigns on social media can torpedo a book before it hits stores."
