= Urban Christian fiction =

Urban Christian fiction is an Imprint of the Kensington Publishing Corp.

It publishes Christian fiction and urban fiction in which stories of emotion and conflict are mixed with God, faith and the urban church. Some of the themes and topics cross over into theological fiction.

The stories usually portray African-American or Latino characters who have God at the center of their lives. Violence and sex is not normally included, but may appear whenever necessary for the story line.

Urban Christian fiction is classified as part of the African-American Christian Market (AACM), where the best-selling topics are fiction, books on dating, dramatic testimony, and single parenting.

== See also ==
Christian novel
