= Religious fiction =

This article is an index of pages on religious fiction, genres of fiction which deal with various religious or spiritual themes and topics.

== Genres by belief ==
- Christian fiction
- Islamic fiction
- Jewish fiction
- Visionary fiction

== Genres by format ==
- Inspirational fiction
- Klerykal fiction
- Theological fiction

== See also ==
- Christianity in Middle-earth
