= Monster literature =

Literature genre

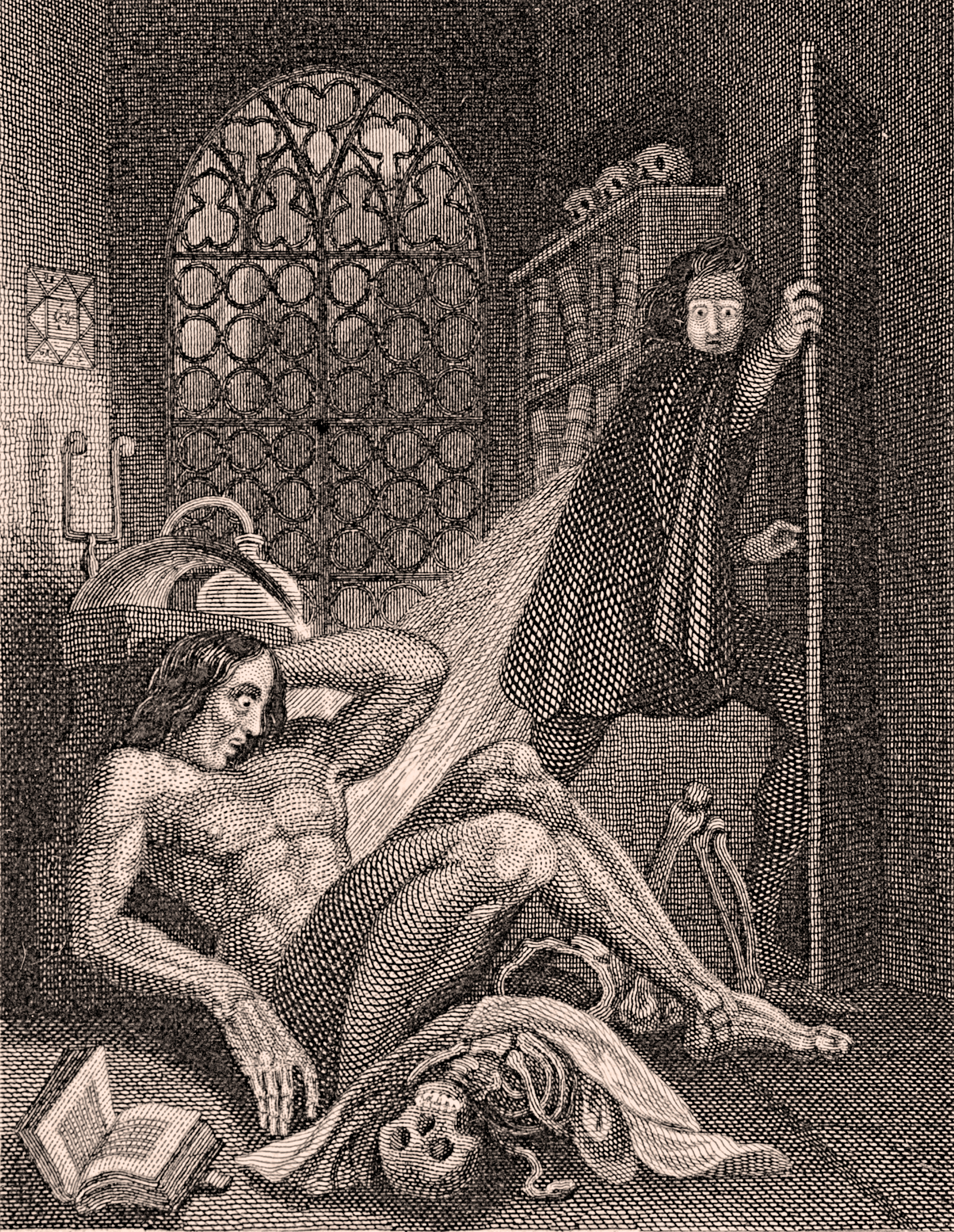
Victor Frankenstein becoming disgusted at his creation. Frankenstein is a prominent example of monster literature.

Monster literature is a genre of fiction that uses the figure of the monster to create an atmosphere of horror or terror, explore themes of good and evil, or embody moral dilemmas and societal concerns. Works of monster literature can often be additionally categorized as works of horror fiction, science fiction, or fantasy, while jiangshi fiction, monster erotica, vampire literature, and werewolf fiction can be considered subgenres of monster literature.

== History ==
=== Precursors and early examples ===
The world’s oldest surviving literary work, the Epic of Gilgamesh features multiple monstrous antagonists, including Humbaba and the Bull of Heaven. Monsters appear frequently in classical literature, including Homer’s Odyssey which features the cyclops Polyphemus, the sirens, and the multi-headed Scylla. Monstrous figures such as Grendel and the dragon are depicted in the epic poem Beowulf, which is contained in the Nowell Codex dating from between AD 975 and 1025.

Classical texts from across Asia also prominently depict monsters, including the Ramayana, Wu Cheng'en's Journey to the West, and the One Thousand and One Nights.

=== 19th century ===
Although the Gothic novel existed since the publication of Horace Walpole’s 1764 novel The Castle of Otranto, an association between Gothic fiction and the monster developed in the 19th century through the publication of works like Sheridan Le Fanu’s Carmilla (1872), Robert Louis Stevenson’s Strange Case of Dr Jekyll and Mr Hyde (1886), and Bram Stoker’s Dracula (1897).

The creature in Mary Shelley’s Frankenstein (1818) has been cited as one of the most influential literary monsters from this period. Anne K. Mellor called it “our culture’s most penetrating literary analysis of the psychology of modern “scientific” man, of the dangers inherent in scientific research, and of the horrifying but predictable consequences of an uncontrolled technological exploitation of nature and the female”, while academic Fred Botting writes in Making monstrous: Frankenstein, criticism, theory, that "Frankenstein's brood of monsters is still at very much at large in popular culture, proliferating on cinema screens and in science fiction stories. As well as being assimilated and reconstructed in these texts, 'Frankenstein' has entered common parlance to describe the uncontrollable product of science or a mad scientist".

=== I Am Legend ===
In Richard Matheson's I Am Legend (1954), Robert Neville is the last human alive on Earth. He secludes himself in his home, fortified with iron doors, mirrors, and garlic to keep away the infected vampire-like beings that remain after a mysterious infection has spread among the living creatures on earth. These infected beings, like vampires, only appear at night and taunt Neville with sexual promiscuity to come out of his home so they can suck his blood. Neville struggles with loneliness and a sense of desolation after losing his wife and daughter in a plane crash while trying to escape the epidemic, and combats these emotions with a constant stream of alcohol. Neville frequently reminisces about his most gut wrenching experiences, such as killing his own dog after she became infected. The reader is constantly sympathizing with Neville, as he is portrayed as helpless and isolated, lacking any real chance of living a pleasant life. The reader feels an overwhelming sensation of hopelessness, sadness, and sympathy for Neville.

=== 21st century ===
The novels in Stephenie Meyer’s Twilight series, beginning with Twilight (2005), have been among the most popular books featuring traditional folkloric monsters (specifically, vampires and werewolves) to be published in the 21st century. Twilight has been translated into 37 different languages, was the highest-selling book of 2008, and in 2019 BBC news included the series on a list of the 100 most inspiring novels of all time. In a 2011 article, scholar Fleur Diamond noted that Twilight belongs to “a growing publishing sub-category of Young Adult supernatural romance in which young female characters claim a sexuality that transgresses heterosexual norms by forming erotic ties with human–creature hybrids”. The monster as a figure of desire is a common feature of paranormal romance, in which vampires, shapeshifters, or other supernatural beings may desire and be desired in turn by a human protagonist.

As described by Tsing et al. in their 2017 book Arts of Living on a Damaged Planet: Ghosts and Monsters of the Anthropocene, an understanding of monsters as figures situated in the Anthropocene, a time in which human impact has become a planetary force of change, has emerged. They write that “[in] this time of massive human transformation of multispecies life and their uneven effects…monsters are the wonders of symbiosis and the threats of ecological description.”. A literary example of this is Jeff VanderMeer’s Southern Reach Series. Throughout this series’ first novel Annihilation (2014), the protagonists overhear a moaning sound, leading one to posit that the moaning creature “was, or had once been, human.” In a 2018 article published in Orbis Litterarum, Gözde Ersoy invokes philosopher Slavoj Žižek's concept of “inhuman monsters” to argue that VanderMeer's work represents a "new phase in our relationship with the monstrous", decentering humanity in the narrative in order to blur the boundary between humans and the environment.

== Scholarship ==
Although the term “monster literature” has been in use from the mid-twentieth century, (Note: For example, Peter Clemoes’ 1954 publication The Anglo-Saxons: Studies in Some Aspects of Their History and Culture, Presented to Bruce Dickins refers to Beowulf as an instance of “monster literature”.), scholarship around the monster as a literary figure began to coalesce after medieval scholar Jeffrey Jerome Cohen coined the term “monster theory” in 1996 to describe an understanding of the monstrous in fiction as a reflection of the cultural fears of the society which produced it.

Themes of monster literature that have been recognized by scholars include abjection, duality, and isolation. In the introduction to Thinking Monstrosity in Western and Global Literatures and Creative Media, Nizar Zouidi writes: “Monsters are very similar to us...In this sense, they exist on the verge of humanness, threatening to swallow it...or contaminate it.” This relates to Julia Kristeva’s theory of abjection, specifically the notion of the monster as a site of the repulsive “other”.

The double is of thematic concern in some works of monster literature, such as in the Strange Case of Dr Jekyll and Mr Hyde, in which Robert Louis Stevenson writes in regards to the titular Dr. Jekyll and his monstrous alter ego Hyde: “man is not truly one, but truly two”.

Isolation has been identified in monster literature as both a cause and a symptom of monstrousness. For example, in regards to the relationship between monstrousness and isolation in the works of H.P. Lovecraft, editor Stefan Dziemianowicz wrote in 1991 that "Lovecraft's work has been characterized as almost pathological in its use of characters alienated from normal human society”'. The monster may also present as a figure of fantasy-fulfillment, delivering the protagonist from social isolation. Heather Duerre Humann identifies Twilight's vampiric deuteragonist Edward Cullen with the Byronic hero, "intelligent, arrogant, and isolated".

== See Also ==
- Dark romanticism
- Gothic fiction
- Horror fiction
- Monster movie

== Notes ==
=== Bibliography ===
- Cohen, Jeffrey Jerome (1996). Monster Theory: Reading Culture. University Of Minnesota Press. ISBN 978-0816628551.
- Kristeva, Julia (1982). Powers of Horror: An Essay on Abjection. Columbia University Press. ISBN 9780231053471.
- Tsing, Anna Lowenhaupt; Bubandt, Nils Jerome; Gan, Elaine; Swanson, Heather Anne, eds. (2017). Arts of Living on a Damaged Planet: Ghosts and Monsters of the Anthropocene. University Of Minnesota Press. ISBN 9781517902377.
- Žižek, Slavoj (2013). The Neighbor: Three Inquiries in Political Theology. The University of Chicago Press. ISBN 9780226045207.
