= Metaparody =

Form of humor consisting of parodying the parody

Metaparody is a form of humor or literary technique consisting "parodying the parody of the original", sometimes to the degree that the viewer is unclear as to which subtext is genuine and which subtext parodic. The American literary critic Gary Saul Morson has written extensively on the topic:

In texts of this type, each voice may be taken to be parodic of the other; readers are invited to entertain each of the resulting contradictory interpretations in potentially endless succession. In this sense such texts remain fundamentally open... readers may witness the alternation of statement and counterstatement, interpretation and antithetical interpretation, up to a conclusion which fails, often ostentatious, to resolve their hermeneutic perplexity. (Morson 1989)
