= Orbis Litterarum =

Academic literary journal

- Discipline: Literature
- Language: Danish; English; French; German
- Edited by: Christian Benne; Sofie Kluge; Mads Rosendahl Thomsen

Publication details
- History: 1943–present
- Publisher: Wiley
- Frequency: Bimonthly
- Open access: Hybrid
- Impact factor: 0.2 (2022)

Standard abbreviations
- ISO 4: Orb. Litt.

Indexing
- ISSN: 0105-7510 (print); 1600-0730 (web)
- OCLC no.: 506653289

Links
- Journal homepage; Online access; Online archive

Orbis Litterarum is a bimonthly peer-reviewed academic journal covering general and comparative literature research and literary criticism. It is published by Wiley and the editors-in-chief are Christian Benne (University of Copenhagen), Sofie Kluge (University of Southern Denmark), and Mads Rosendahl Thomsen (Aarhus University). The journal was established in 1943 and temporarily ceased publication between 1951 and 1953. The journal publishes articles written in Danish, English, French, and German.

== Abstracting and indexing ==
The journal is abstracted and indexed in:

- Arts and Humanities Citation Index
- Current Contents/Arts & Humanities
- EBSCO databases
- International Bibliography of Periodical Literature
- Modern Language Association Database
- ProQuest databases
- Répertoire International de Littérature Musicale
- Scopus

According to the Journal Citation Reports, the journal has a 2022 impact factor of 0.2.
