= Parable of the Talents (novel) =

1998 novel by Octavia E. Butler

- Cover of first edition (hardcover)
- Author: Octavia E. Butler
- Language: English
- Series: Parable duology
- Genre: Dystopian, science fiction
- Publisher: Seven Stories Press
- Publication date: 1998
- Publication place: United States
- Media type: Print (Hardcover & Paperback)
- Pages: 365 (first edition, hardback)
- ISBN: 1-888363-81-9 (first edition, hardback)
- OCLC: 39478160
- Dewey Decimal: 813/.54 21
- LC Class: PS3552.U827 P38 1998
- Preceded by: Parable of the Sower

Parable of the Talents is a science fiction novel by the American writer Octavia E. Butler, published in 1998. It is the second in a series of two, a sequel to Parable of the Sower. It won the Nebula Award for Best Novel.

== Plot ==
Parable of the Talents is told from the points of view of Lauren Oya Olamina, her daughter Larkin Olamina/Asha Vere, and Lauren's husband Taylor Franklin Bankole. The novel consists of journal entries by Lauren and Bankole and passages by Asha Vere. In 2032, five years after the events of the previous novel Parable of the Sower, Lauren has founded a new community called Acorn, located in the hills of Cape Mendocino. The community is centered around her religion, Earthseed, which is predicated on the belief that humanity's destiny is to travel beyond Earth and live on other planets in order for humanity to reach adulthood.

The novel is set against the backdrop of a dystopian United States that has come under the grip of a Christian fundamentalist denomination called "Christian America" led by President Andrew Steele Jarret. Seeking to restore American power and prestige, and using the slogan "Make America Great Again", Jarret embarks on a crusade to cleanse America of non-Christian faiths. Slavery has resurfaced with advanced "shock collars" being used to control slaves. Virtual reality headsets known as "Dreamasks" are also popular since they enable wearers to escape their harsh reality.

During the course of the novel, Acorn is attacked and taken over by Christian American "Crusaders" and turned into a re-education camp. For the next year and a half, Lauren and the other adults are enslaved and forced to wear "slave collars". Their Christian American captors exploit them as forced labor under the pretext of "reforming" them. Lauren and several of the women are also regularly raped by their captors, who regard them as "heathen". In 2035, Lauren and her followers eventually rebel and kill their captors. To avoid retribution, they are forced to disperse into hiding. By 2036, President Jarret is defeated after a single term due to public dissatisfaction with the "Alaska–Canada War" and revelations of his role in witch burnings.

Lauren looks for Larkin for over a year, travelling throughout Northern California and Oregon in her search. At the same time, she decides to re-establish Earthseed by teaching individuals about the religion during her travels and training them to educate others. She gains a significant following among the affluent in Portland, Oregon, and one of her more ardent supporters helps her publish Earthseed: The First Book of the Living online, which contains the verses she wrote defining the religion. This launches both Earthseed and her influence nationwide. At the same time, as she is hopeful for the future of humanity amongst the stars, she gradually abandons hope that she will find Larkin and gives up her search.

Meanwhile, Larkin is adopted by an African American Christian America family and renamed "Asha Vere Alexander" after a popular Dreamask hero. Unloved and abused by her adoptive parents, Asha grows up never knowing who her biological parents are. As an adult, Asha reunites with her uncle Marcos "Marc" Duran, who was believed to have perished in the events of the previous novel and has since become a Christian America minister. With Uncle Marc's help, Larkin becomes an academic historian but leaves the Christian faith.

Unknown to Asha, Uncle Marc had previously re-established contact with his long-lost half-sister Lauren. Marc claimed that the "Crusaders" were rogue elements who do not represent Christian America. He tells Asha that her mother is dead, and never told Lauren he had found her daughter. With Jarret's legacy in disgrace, Lauren's Earthseed religion grows in popularity in a post-war United States and throughout the rest of the world, funding scholarships for needy university students and encouraging humanity to leave Earth and settle in other worlds.

After Asha learns that Lauren is her biological mother, she manages to meet with her. Though Asha is unable to forgive her mother for choosing to dedicate her life to Earthseed instead of continuing to look for her, Lauren tells her daughter that her door is always open. After learning that her half-brother Uncle Marc hid the fact that Asha was related to Lauren, Lauren severs all ties with her estranged brother, which further strains her relationship with Asha. They talk occasionally over the next 23 years but never truly bond as Asha decided "She never really needed us, so we didn't let ourselves need her." Lauren dies at the age of 81 after watching the first shuttles leaving Earth for the starship Christopher Columbus, which carries settlers in suspended animation to the first human colony on another world.

== Reception ==
Parable of the Talents won the 2000 Nebula Award for Best Novel. The academic Jana Diemer Llewellyn regards it as an indictment of religious fundamentalism and compares the novel to Joanna Russ' The Female Man and Margaret Atwood's The Handmaid's Tale. In 2017, Los Angeles Times op-ed editor Abby Aguirre likened the religious fundamentalism and authoritarianism of President Jarret to the "Make America Great Again" rhetoric of the Trump administration. In 2020, amid an uptick in interest in Butler's writing that some attributed to the COVID-19 pandemic, Parable of the Sower appeared on The New York Times Best Seller list. In 2025, LA Taco writer Marina Watanabe said that modern Los Angeles resembles the fictionalized version of it that Butler presents in Parable of the Sower, citing the fire that burned much of Altadena in early 2025 and "a right-wing demagogue [rising] to power with the slogan: 'Make America Great Again.'"

An opera version of Parable of the Sower, co-written by Toshi Reagon and Bernice Johnson Reagon, debuted in 2023.

== Proposed third Parable novel ==
Butler had planned to write several more Parable novels, tentatively titled Parable of the Trickster, Parable of the Teacher, Parable of Chaos, and Parable of Clay. Parable of the Trickster was the most developed and would have focused on the community's struggle to survive on a new planet, Bow. She began this novel after finishing Parable of the Talents and mentioned her work on it in several interviews, but at some point encountered writer's block that led to numerous false starts. She eventually shifted her creative attention, resulting in Fledgling, her final novel. The various false starts in the novel can now be found among Butler's papers at the Huntington Library, as described in an article in the Los Angeles Review of Books.

== See also ==
- List of science fiction novels
- Works by Octavia Butler
