= Matrixism =

Purported religion inspired by the Matrix film series

- A "赤", the kanji figure for red, the symbol of Matrixism
- Formation: 2004 (summer)
- Founder: Anonymous
- Type: New religious movement
- Purpose: Belief inspired by The Matrix film series
- Members: 300 claimed (May 2005); "over sixteen hundred" claimed (per group's own website)

Matrixism, or The Path of the One, is a purported religion inspired by Lana & Lilly Wachowski's The Matrix film series. Conceived by an anonymous group in the summer of 2004, it claimed to have attracted 300 members by May 2005, and the religion's GeoCities website claimed "over sixteen hundred members". There was some debate about whether followers of Matrixism are indeed serious about their practice; however, the religion (real or otherwise) received some attention in the media.

== History ==
Matrixism, also referred to as "The path of the One," was primarily introduced in 2004. A Yahoo GeoCities website created by an anonymous author served as the basis for the religion. Matrixism is inspired by the Matrix trilogy and its associated stories (including The Animatrix). However, these stories are not the sole foundation. The ideals of Matrixism can be traced back to the early 20th century to The Promulgation of Universal Peace, the record of talks by `Abdu'l-Bahá during his journeys to the West in the United States. Nor is this the first time a book of his inspired a religious community to form.

== Tenets ==
Matrixism comprises four main beliefs, collectively known as "The Four Tenets of Matrixism". Briefly these were: belief in a messianic prophecy, use of psychedelic drugs as sacrament, a perception of reality as multi-layered and semi-subjective, and adherence to the principles of at least one of the world's major religions. The Matrixism website singles out April 19 as a holiday – otherwise known as Bicycle Day – marks the anniversary of Albert Hofmann's 1943 experiment with LSD.

== Symbology ==
The adopted symbol for Matrixism was the Japanese kanji symbol for "red". This symbol was used in the video game Enter the Matrix. The color is a reference to the red pill, which symbolizes acceptance of and the ability to see truth, as established early in the first Matrix film.

== See also ==
- Baháʼí Faith
- New religious movements
- Parody religion
- Religion and the Internet
- Cybersectarianism
- Religious satire
