= Visionary fiction =

Genre of fiction with New Age or mystical themes

Visionary fiction is a fiction genre with New Age or mind, body, spirit themes and perspectives, including consciousness expansion, spirituality, mysticism, and parapsychology. It is classed as a subtype of speculative fiction. Examples include the novels The Celestine Prophecy, The Alchemist, and Illusions: The Adventures of a Reluctant Messiah. The Book Industry Study Group's BISAC subject heading FIC039000 is "FICTION / Visionary & Metaphysical".

Although similar themes and content occur in the literature of numerous cultures in many ages, the term "visionary fiction" was suggested by Renée Weber, professor of philosophy at Rutgers University, and used by John Algeo in a 1982 article describing recent examples and earlier precursors. By the year 2000 it had recognition as a distinct genre. Contemporary authors have formed organizations like the Visionary Fiction Alliance to clearly define what the genre is and what works belong to this category, advocate the use of this term for all fiction of the determined type, and promote authorship and readership of this form of fiction.

== Definitions ==
While the basic definition of visionary fiction—the literary form that illustrates and demonstrates the process of growth in human consciousness—is now generally accepted, it remains an evolving genre with some controversy over what literature it includes. Following are some of the most frequently cited definitions, sometimes at variance with each other, which illustrate the range, historically and ideologically, of the term's usage.

=== "Visionary" ===
As a literary term, the word visionary is defined thus: "Visionary writing has the qualities of prophecy—perhaps it is apocalyptic in imagery, or it may be predictive in its insights, or it may contain a core of moral truth. Many of the Romantic poets (especially Blake) have been labeled visionary. Note that in its literary sense, visionary writing need not be religious in nature, though it frequently is."

=== Carl Jung ===
In his 1929 lecture, "Psychology and Literature," (also a chapter in Modern Man in Search of a Soul), psychologist Carl Jung divides all works of art into two distinct forms, psychological and visionary. "The psychological work of art always takes its materials from the vast real of conscious human experience—from the vivid foreground of life, we might say." What is currently classified as mainstream or realism. "The latter [visionary] reverses all the conditions of the former [psychological]. The experience that furnishes the material for artistic expression is no longer familiar. It is a strange something that derives its existence from the hinterlands of man's mind—that suggests the abyss of time separating us from pre-human ages, or evokes a superhuman world of contrasting light and darkness." Jung's model would classify all serious imaginative literature, including the classics like Homer, Virgil, and Beowulf, as Visionary Fiction.

=== Flo Keyes ===
In The Literature of Hope in the Middle Ages And Today, Flo Keyes endorses Jung's term, visionary fiction, while detailing the medieval romance's impact on modern Fantasy and Science Fiction: "Jung places greater value on what he calls visionary novels, novels in which fundamental human experiences are tapped and shaped and left to the individual to interpret. These visionary works are stories that break the bonds of everyday human experience."

=== Walidah Imarisha and adrienne maree brown ===
Activists and Authors Walidah Imarisah and adrienne maree brown put together a group of activists to write short stories for Octavia's Brood: Science Fiction Stories from Social Justice Movements. In materials for the book they put forward a different definition of visionary fiction "We believe that radical science fiction is actually better termed visionary fiction because it pulls from real life experience, inequalities and movement building to create innovative ways of understanding the world around us, paint visions of new worlds that could be, and teach us new ways of interacting with one another. Visionary fiction engages our imaginations and hearts, and guides our hands as organizers."

Walidah Imarisha further said visionary fiction "allows us to imagine possibilities outside of what exists today. The only way we know we can challenge the divine right of kings is by being able to imagine a world where kings no longer rule us—or do not even exist. Visionary fiction offers social justice movements a process to explore creating those new worlds....This term reminds us to be utterly unrealistic in our organizing, because it is only through imagining the so-called impossible that we can begin to concretely build it. When we free our imaginations, we question everything".

=== Michael Gurian ===
American author and social philosopher Michael Gurian, one of the first to promote the genre on the web, wrote: "'Visionary fiction' is fiction in which the expansion of the human mind drives the plot. Where science fiction is characterized by storytelling based in expanded use of science to drive narrative, visionary fiction is characterized by storytelling based in expanded use of mental ability to drive narrative."

=== Visionary Fiction Alliance ===
The Visionary Fiction Alliance defines the term thus: "Visionary Fiction embraces spiritual and esoteric wisdom, often from ancient sources, and makes it relevant for our modern life. These gems of wisdom are brought forth in story form and in a way that readers can experience the wisdom from within themselves. It emphasizes and envisions humanity's transition into evolved consciousness. While there is a strong theme, it in no way proselytizes or preaches. Visionary is a tone as well as a genre. The ‘visionary’ element can technically be present in any genre and set in any time."

=== Hal Zina Bennett ===
Visionary Fiction pioneer, Hal Zina Bennett describes the genre thus: "Visionary fiction often deals with the stuff that happens at the edge between inner and outer, glimpsing those moments when the ‘thin veil’, the boundary between inner and outer worlds, dissolves or is at least briefly drawn away. Every moment of our lives there's some of that interchange between inner and outer, of course. Our ‘visionary fiction’ focuses on that phenomenon itself. Stories written in this genre draw our attention to how our visions inform us and impact our lives... The ‘vision’ part of visionary fiction is the vehicle that carries us to the filmy veil separating our ability to know from what we can't know." Visionary fiction, he concludes, generally acknowledges something bigger, limitless, actually, beyond what Aldous Huxley called the ‘phenomenological’ world.

=== Edward J. Ahearn ===
Edward J. Ahearn's definition in Visionary Fictions: Apocalyptic Writing from Blake to the Modern Age, is summarized thus on the book's jacket cover: "Visionary writers seek a personal way to explode the normal experience of the ‘real,’ using prophetic visions, fantastic tales, insane rantings, surrealistic dreams, and drug- or sex-induced dislocations in their work. Their fiction expresses rebellion against all the values of Western civilization—personal, sexual, familial, religious, moral, societal, and political. Yet even though they are anti-realistic, they do react to specific aspects of modern reality, such as the recurring promise and failure of social revolution." To some current VF authors, Ahearn's “shock and awe” definition of VF may be extreme although it does provide an antidote against too saccharine an approach.

=== Inspirational fiction ===
The Wikipedia article inspirational fiction mentions Michael Gurian and others as promoting the term visionary fiction and cites it as "possibly a subgenre of inspirational fiction."

== Characteristics ==
An analysis of available sources cites the following characteristics as essential to Visionary Fiction, noting that such elements, like the definition of Visionary Fiction, intentionally remains fluid to accommodate innovation.

=== Growth in consciousness ===
The primary characteristic of VF, according to the Visionary Fiction Alliance: "Growth of consciousness is the central theme of the story and drives the protagonist, and/or other important characters." In "The Altered State of Visionary Fiction," Monty Joynes writes: "For me, the Visionary Fiction genre includes novels that deal with shifts in awareness that result in metaphysical understanding by the central characters. The plot of the novel is generally more concerned with internal experiences than with external." Michael Gurian also makes it preeminent: "Visionary fiction is fiction in which the expansion of the human mind drives the plot." All commentators on the basic nature of VF seem to agree that growth in consciousness is the hallmark of Visionary Fiction. In any credible story, the characters must change, but in VF this change is from the inside out rather than from outside in. Growth in consciousness dictates that Visionary Fiction be optimistic. With realism, birth inevitably results in death. In VF, death tends to rebirth at a higher level.

=== Reader experience ===
Visionary Fiction author Jodine Turner writes: "Visionary Fiction is like the legendary Celtic Immram (the mythical heroes’ quest). The drama and tension of the characters’ adventures is one layer of the tale. All of the usual elements of suspense, conflict, even romance and mystery, are interwoven in the plot. The other layer, deeper and more archetypal, is that mystical inner journey of spiritual awakening. In Visionary Fiction, esoteric wisdom is embedded in story so that the reader can actually experience it, instead of merely learning about it." And author Margaret Duarte seconds this notion: "What separates VF from other speculative fiction is intention. Besides telling a good story, VF enlightens and encourages readers to expand their awareness of greater possibilities." Visionary Fiction renders the reading experience interactive. Readers have progressed beyond where they can just be told (the authority paradigm); instead, the visionary model gives them the bare essentials and invites them to try it (the Gnostic or experiential model). The best VF is multi-layered to suit readers at different awareness levels.

=== Spiritual component ===
The VF Alliance definition states: "[Visionary Fiction] embraces spiritual and esoteric wisdom, often from ancient sources, and makes it relevant for our modern life." Clearly differentiating itself from conventional religion and its associated genre, religious fiction, Visionary Fiction's spirituality is all-inclusive with an appeal that, according to the Visionary Fiction Alliance, "is universal in its worldview and scope." Since it lacks this universal ingredient, spiritually-oriented fiction that highlights a single issue,(recovery, women's’ rights, political reform), is not generally considered Visionary Fiction.

VF's spiritual focus does not require it to have a "feel good" flavor. While Edward Ahearn's dark apocalyptic leaning in his definition may be extreme, it serves to remind that the spiritual conflicts addressed in VF are serious, existential, and often life-threatening in the process of becoming life changing.

=== Paranormal perceptions ===
The word visionary indicates an ability to perceive beyond the normal purview. Growth in consciousness implies transcending the five senses when assigning validity to an extrasensory experience. Monty Joynes states, "The work is also ‘visionary’ in the aspect that the authors sometimes (or often) employ non-rational means such as dreams or extrasensory perceptions to develop the content of the book." Michael Gurian is more emphatic about the inclusion of this element, stating that in VF such extraordinary phenomena "not only happen, but drive the plot and its characters (i.e. without these experiences, there would be no plot or character)." The VF Alliance maintains that VF "oftentimes uses reincarnation, dreams, visions, paranormal, psychic abilities, and other metaphysical plot devices." In his article "Visionary Fiction: Rediscovering Ancient Paths to Truth," Hal Zina Bennett addresses the use of paranormal elements in VF more mythically: "Like a shaman's stories of the spirit world, where the spirits of animals, trees, sky, or the stars teach us how to live, visionary fiction introduces us to a reality beyond physical reality. They often carry us deep into a consciousness once thought to be the domain of seers, visionaries, oracles and psychics. The magic of this genre is the magic of human consciousness itself, our ability to see beneath the surface and create new visions of what our lives can be." The use of a paranormal element does not make fiction automatically visionary. A detective story with a mentalist as the crime solver might only be considered visionary if it demonstrates how the psychic's gift produces a higher state of consciousness.

== Distinguishing visionary fiction ==
Determining what is and what is not visionary fiction suffers all the ills of any classification system with the definition of genre in fiction being especially problematic. For the last century, the library profession has held fiction in endemic disdain, and both the Dewey Decimal Classification system and the Library of Congress Classification system assign all fiction to a narrow range of numbers without any further breakout into fiction type. Largely as a response to seller and buyer demand, an ad hoc fiction genre system emerged during the 20th century, although some of its labels remain loosely defined or duplicative. Nevertheless, in recent years visionary fiction has emerged sufficiently into a recognizable genre that it can now be distinguished from its ancestors and close relatives.

=== Mainstream fiction (realism) ===
As noted above, Carl Jung divided all serious literature between psychological and visionary. He further explains the fiction type he designated psychological, and thus not-visionary, as taking "its materials from the vast realm of conscious human experience—from the vivid foreground of life." Flo Keyes elaborates: "In these works, the psychological components of the characters and their behavior have already been scrutinized by the author, and little room has been left for interpretation by the reader… Mainstream fiction as described here would encompass everything from Madame Bovary to the latest Danielle Steel novel, all of which concentrate on revealing our psychological motivations and responses to us rather than letting us discover them for ourselves in our reactions to what we have read." Today, we would substitute mainstream or realistic for psychological, and all such works are easily recognized as beyond the pale of visionary fiction.

=== Science fiction/fantasy ===
Works of fantasy by definition go apart from the world of the senses for story material, and thus are not mainstream or realistic. And, many works of speculative fiction/fantasy (paranormal, supernatural, utopian, dystopian, apocalyptic, post-apocalyptic, science fiction, magical realism, alternative history) have substance beyond the sensational and purpose beyond entertainment, some enough to be classified as VF. A rule of thumb to differentiate is given by author Margaret Duarte: "What separates VF from other speculative fiction is intention. Besides telling a good story, VF enlightens and encourages readers to expand their awareness of greater possibilities." Comparing Science Fiction to VF, Michael Gurian says: "Visionary fiction is not science fiction, yet if a skeptic needs ‘scientific proof’ of the reality of the visionary landscape, it can be connected to the new neural sciences—neurobiology, neuropsychology, neurophysics. All visionary fiction is driven by new and uncanny experiences (mystical, spiritual and paranormal) in the neural web. The new sciences have shown us over the last three decades how vast and limitless is the increasing power of the human mind. As in so many eras of human life, where our science goes our literature follows."

=== Religious/spiritual/new age fiction ===
Since visionary fiction concerns itself with consciousness and its evolution, it requires a spiritual component. However, as Gurian notes, it should not be equated with religious fiction: "Religious fiction is a phrase that generally means Christian fiction. The most famous examples would be the Left Behind series. In this kind of fiction, plot is driven by a religious topography. Whether Christian, Jewish, Hindu in base, religious fiction is a footnote to the already written topography of the religion itself."

He says it is also not the same as New Age Fiction: "Where religious literature is pre-structured by a religion, ‘new age literature’ tends to be the opposite: employing loose adventure formats which can be laden with personal wisdom teaching. The topography or structure of the narrative is not very important in new age literature: the teaching is most important."

Neither is it spiritual fiction: "I make a distinction between ‘spiritual fiction’ and ‘visionary fiction’ that others may find to be too fine.... In spiritual fiction (as in new age literature), spirituality rather than mental ability drives the plot," Gurian maintains.

Given its spiritual component, VF works are often found in some combination with spiritual and new age fiction. Gurian recognizes this and qualifies himself by noting that "a lot of visionary fiction is very spiritual" and acknowledging that "in the publishing market, visionary fiction, spiritual fiction, new age fiction and even new age nonfiction all blur together for marketing purposes." He predicts a clearer "distinction to be made over the next decades between novels that are written for the purpose of teaching spirituality and novels that are written about our growing mental abilities per se, with the story itself breaking new ground." A rule of thumb to distinguish spiritual from visionary fiction: if the novel's spiritual focus is passive, that is, it features an external power (an institution, dogma, charismatic leader, practice, or talisman) that affects the individual, it is religious/New Age/spiritual fiction. If the focus is active with the spiritual power generated and motivated from within the individual and flowing outward to positively affect the environment, it is visionary fiction.

=== Metaphysical fiction ===
Although BISAC groups Visionary & Metaphysical together as a single Main Subject Category under Fiction, the genres are not identical.

Metaphysical Fiction was originally identified with Philosophical fiction, "in which a significant proportion of the work is devoted to a discussion of the sort of questions normally addressed in discursive philosophy. These might include the function and role of society, the purpose of life, ethics or morals, the role of art in human lives, and the role of experience or reason in the development of knowledge." Novels by Albert Camus, Hermann Hesse, Philip K. Dick, Ayn Rand, and Umberto Eco are categorized as such.

Still there is a distinction, which author Talia Newland makes: "Sometimes the terms are used synonymously but my understanding is that visionary fiction is more obviously ‘spiritual’ in nature, and that an individual's movement towards self-actualization is a primary theme. In metaphysical fiction, though the philosophy underlies the story, the story takes precedence over expression of the philosophy; in visionary fiction the expression of the philosophy is more important than the story. According to Karen Rider, "Metaphysical Fiction encompasses topics like energy healing, past lives, intuition...events or experiences that we may be able to subjectively experience or sense but cannot objectively measure or explain. In the narrative, metaphysical phenomenon is part of ordinary human experience in ways that create conflict for the characters, propelling the story forward to find out how will the character deal with these events." Again the active/passive focus rule above can be used to differentiate the Metaphysical Fiction from VF although more genre-crossing can be expected.

A June 2014 article on the Visionary Fiction Alliance website widely supported BISAC's marriage of the two genres into the single category: Visionary & Metaphysical.

== Publishing and marketing ==
=== Publishing history ===
Prior to the 20-teens, visionary fiction as a genre experienced difficulty gaining a reputation as marketable with traditional publishers and thus dedicated shelf space in libraries and bookstores.

This faltering on the way to popular acclaim may be intrinsic to the genre's content. Speaking of visionary fiction, which necessarily deals with uncomfortable material and challenges the reader to change his level of consciousness, Carl Jung noted, "The reading public for the most part repudiates this kind of writing—unless indeed it is coarsely sensational—and even the literary critic seems embarrassed by it." Because it was not already in demand by agents and publishers, quality writers stayed with more popular genres, while VF and similar genres attracted a disproportionate number of authors (many from other professions) with brilliant ideas but inferior writing skills. A few such works, like James Redfield's Celestine Prophecy, did rocket up the best-seller lists, which may have misled authors to assume that a sublime message trumps amateur writing. Hal Zina Bennet says of such deficiencies: "What happens in most visionary fiction that I’ve read over the years is that it gets burdened down by the author's desire to get readers to believe what he or she believes. Characters disappear in the author's message, which is another way of saying that they are two-dimensional, thinly disguised vehicles that simply recite the author's beliefs." Before 2000 a number of unsuccessful attempts were made to market VF as a distinct genre, most notably at Hampton Roads Publishing of which editor Bob Friedman said, "We tried mightily to get the retailing powers to start a visionary fiction shelf. We came close with Walden, but the suits at B&N, alas, took the position of ‘no one is coming into the store asking for visionary fiction’." In 2003 author and social philosopher Michael Gurian launched the website visionaryfiction.org that defined VF in his terms and expressed his hope "that like-minded writers will create a visionary fiction writers association." His effort failed to get any direct traction when Gurian had relax participation in favor of his professional pursuits. Nevertheless, credit his vision that inspired later efforts: "If this takes off, it opens new avenues for writers over the next generations. I envision a publishing culture in which my children and their children have access to visionary fiction in the same way that I—because of the hard work of previous generations—have access to science fiction."

=== Current status ===
==== BISAC categorization ====
The genre system that evolved ad hoc through the mid-20th century was finally formed into an organized but flexible classification system of Marketing Categories through the work of the Book Industry Study Group founded in 1975. This non-profit organization developed the BISAC (Book Industry Subject and Category) Subject Headings, now considered the industry standard and a requirement for participation in many book listing databases. While it is now considered best practice for publishers, manufacturers, suppliers, wholesalers, and retailers, and has gained ground in some libraries, its use is not yet universal.

In the 2013 edition of BISAC, Visionary Fiction is assigned a first-level Main Subject Category (FIC039000 FICTION / Visionary & Metaphysical), thus giving the genre a specific slot in the coding scheme, which is gaining reflection in bookstore shelving and online classification schemes.

==== Conventional publishers ====
In December 2013 Len Vlahos, executive director of BISG, stated: "BISAC Subject Codes are a voluntary industry standard. Many, if not all, large retailers use the BISAC Codes as a basis for identifying content, but then augment those codes based on their own customer intelligence. The retailers consider this augmentation to be a kind of special sauce. This is, of course, one of the challenges of voluntary standards, but we're still pleased at how widely adopted and used BISAC codes are." The words voluntary and special sauce allow a latitude in categorization that could mean continued obscurity for VF titles if authors and agents continue to be published under other more "popular" categories, as has been the practice.

Barnes and Noble requires BISAC codes for all books, print and electronic, and yet on Barnesandnoble.com, neither Visionary Fiction nor Metaphysical Fiction appears in their category browser. Typing "visionary fiction" into the search box does bring up more than 7,000 results, but several items on the very first page are not even fiction. Thus the tendency to publish titles that are clearly VF labeled as a more popular or generic genre continues. Best-selling VF authors (Coelho, Redfield, etc.) are routinely shelved with Literature and Fiction. Lesser known authors may find themselves in the New Age section among mostly non-fiction titles.

The few traditional publishers that directly solicit and encourage VF works tend to be small and unstable.

==== Online vendors ====
While online vendor, Amazon, claims to adhere to BISAC strictly, its print offerings are usually pre-coded by the publishers with results similar to the above.

EBooks uploaded by the author also face hurdles during the categorization process. As Louisa Locke explains: "The ‘categories’ Amazon offers when you upload your book to KDP are based on BISAC categories.... What authors find confusing is that Amazon converts the BISAC categories into the Amazon browsing-path categories and subcategories that show up in the Kindle store––and the two are not always identical." To find Visionary Fiction listed in Amazon's Categories, requires the path Books> Literature & Fiction> Genre Fiction> Religious and Inspirational> Visionary Fiction. Typing visionary fiction in the Search box brings up an unwieldy 8,000+ results.

Smashwords, like Amazon, professes to follow BISAC, but Visionary Fiction does not appear at all in its listed Categories.

==== Cross genres and subgenres ====
The increased tendency of contemporary authors to cross genres, which increases the complexity of categorization, is especially evident with VF writers. Nevertheless, such hybrids, like Kate Atkinson's Life after Life (historical and visionary), have proved popular and can produce unique effects. Computer-based systems, now used in brick-and-mortar stores and on-line, support multi-category classification and further refinement in grouping, such as key words, thus making the listing of a single title under several genres and subgenres possible.

Since BISAC has not yet supplied the Visionary & Metaphysical Main Category with subcategories as it has done for other genres, all works of the two types are listed under the main heading without further differentiation. Until the BISAC Main Category is further refined, authors may use keywords to indicate subgenres for marketing and reader convenience.

==== Visionary Fiction Alliance ====
The Visionary Fiction Alliance (VFA) actively organizes and promotes the Visionary fiction genre. The VFA began as a web-ring formed in March 2012 by visionary authors Jodine Turner, Saleena Karim, and Shannan Sinclair, who joined forces to promote their genre via the Visionary Fiction Group at goodreads.com. The Visionary Fiction group expanded to 12 authors before the VFA website live in August 2012. By May 2014 the VFA had 36 member authors ranging from seasoned veterans to developing novices; most of these authors created links on VFA which lead to the authors' personal websites.

The stated objective of the VFA reads:

As the world evolves away from the Newtonian model of the five senses to the more evolved quantum model that includes the sense of spirit so resurgent today, Visionary Fiction is rapidly becoming the genre of choice to express that evolution and predict the breath-taking future that might follow the anticipated leaps. Under its broader umbrella are now gathering works previously classified as spiritual, metaphysical, or science fiction. The VFA aims to provide a home base and central clearing house for readers, writers, and researchers dedicated to this endeavor.

Its purposes are stated as such:

1. Increase awareness of the genre
2. Help readers discover, explore, and enjoy Visionary Fiction
3. Mentor new writers who wish to explore this genre
4. Provide resources for writers of Visionary Fiction
5. Be a place where readers can find Visionary Fiction books and engage in discussion with the authors.

== Scholarship ==
=== Major studies of visionary fiction ===
For an art and study ripe with implications for today's evolving personal and social milieu, formal studies of Visionary Fiction are few, even including university research papers. The following existing comprehensive works on the subject are relatively unknown, even to VF authors, although some have recently been highlighted on websites like that of the Visionary Fiction Alliance.

==== Carl Jung ====
Carl Jung, "Psychology and Literature" (1929 lecture), included in the volume Modern Man in Search of a Soul. Rather than the narrow subgenre it is often reduced to, Jung depicts Visionary Fiction as a super-genre that forms one of the two major divisions of artistic production: "I will call the one mode of artistic creation psychological, and the other visionary." Jung's contribution to Visionary Fiction is highlighted in a two-part series "Carl Jung and Visionary Fiction."

==== Flo Keyes ====
Flo Keyes, The Literature of Hope in the Middle Ages And Today (2006). This work explores the influence of medieval literature on modern fantasy literature as well as such literature's social function. Using Jungian theory, including his view of visionary fiction, it examines the connections between the genres and finds common ground among them in plots that often reflect the recurring cycle of life and the elements of psychological rather than literal realism. Works such as Malory's Le Morte D’Arthur, the Witch World series by Andre Norton, and More Than Human by Theodore Sturgeon are examined in depth.

==== Edward J. Ahearn ====
Edward J. Ahearn, Visionary Fictions: Apocalyptic Writing from Blake to the Modern Age (2011). Starting with the stark premise that visionary writers seek to explode the normal experience of the "real", through devices like prophetic visions, fantastic tales, insane rantings, surrealistic dreams, and drug- or sex-induced dislocations in their work, Ahearn explores the work of a wide variety of authors who have contributed to the genre from the late eighteenth century to the present day. Beginning with William Blake, he traces the evolution of the form in texts by authors including Novalis, Lautréamont, Breton, William Burroughs, and contemporary feminists Monique Wittig and Jamaica Kincaid, among others.

==== Paul Maltby ====
Paul Maltby, The Visionary Moment: A Postmodern Critique (2002). This study aims to debunk any objective base for the visionary experience in general. It critiques the metaphysics and ideology of the visionary moment as a convention in twentieth-century American fiction, from the standpoint of postmodernism. Draws on the works of Don DeLillo, Jack Kerouac, Saul Bellow, Flannery O’Connor, Alice Walker, and William Faulkner. In turn his book has been castigated as a postmodern critique that "hardly deserves the name. Maltby's critique really issues from a particularly straitjacketed form of social constructionism."

=== Additional studies ===
Increased interest in Visionary Fiction as a genre has prompted multiple articles and commentary on the web since 2000, with activity surging since 2012. Weighing in with posts or interviews are prominent authors Hal Zinna Bennett, Monty Joynes, Dean Koontz, and Peggy Payne. Studies into the visionary writing component in the Bible, Jewish and Christian literature, medieval epics (Keyes), romantic prose/poetry (Ahearn) as well as modern authorship appear on the web.

=== University courses ===
While some university programs, such as the James Gunn's Center for the Study of Science Fiction at Kansas University, have long adopted a visionary stance to the study of genre literature, courses in Visionary Fiction proper remain scarce with the subject normally addressed in general literature courses. However, this is changing as demonstrated by recent course descriptions such as "Women's Visionary Literature" at Penn State, and "Visionary Literature: From Dante to Bob Dylan" at Canada's York University Educators like Dr. Mary Mackey, herself a best-selling Visionary author, continue to contribute to VF scholarship.

== Awards and community ==
=== Awards ===
While a comprehensive contest that evaluates and awards Visionary Fiction offerings has not yet been established, various organizations bestow awards for VF as a category, usually chosen or submitted from a select field of authors. Additionally, titles that are mainly VF have received awards under categories other than VF in contests that did not have VF as a category.

A limited sampling:

Conducted annually, the Independent Publisher Book Awards honor the year's best independently published titles from around the world. Visionary Fiction is one of its categories. In 2014 the "IPPY" Award for VF went to Mystic Tea, by Rea Nolan Martin (Wiawaka Press). The Coalition of Visionary Resources (COVR) offers an annual award for Visionary Fiction.

Pope Annalisa by Peter Canova received the Nautilus Book Award Gold Medal for Visionary Fiction. Jeffrey Small's debut novel The Breath of God won the 2012 Nautilus Book Award Gold Medal for best fiction and was hailed as "visionary fiction" by Library Journal. Kate Atkinson's Life after Life: a Novel, an innovative tale of reincarnation in World War II Britain, won the 2013 Goodreads Choice Awards for Historical Fiction.
