= Theological fiction =

Fiction dealing with religious belief

Theological fiction is fictional writing which shapes or depicts people's attitudes towards theological beliefs. It is typically instructional or exploratory rather than descriptive, and it engages specifically with the theoretical ideas which underlie and shape typical responses to religion. Theological fiction, as a concept, is used by both theists and atheists, such as in fictional pantheons and cultures in theological fantasy literature.

== Theological and religious fiction ==
The subject matter of theological novels often overlaps with philosophical novels, particularly when it deals with issues from natural theology (also called philosophy of religion). For example, Roger Olson notes that the problem of evil is a feature of some significant theological fiction.

Theological fiction also overlaps with religious fiction or Christian novels (also called inspirational fiction), especially when dealing with complex ideas such as redemption, salvation and predestination, which have a direct bearing on attitudes towards religious practices. Some authors try to distinguish a theological novel as one which denotes a more idea driven plot, rather than a novel which is about people who happen to be interacting with religion, but the distinction often proves difficult to sustain when ideas and actions are closely interwoven, each influencing the other.

== Theological short stories ==
Examples of the genre (also called novellae) include:

- Candide (1759) by Voltaire
- Book of Judith (1st Century BC) by Anonymous
- "Hell Is the Absence of God" (2001) by Ted Chiang

== Theological long fiction ==
Examples of theological long fiction include:

- Philosophus Autodidactus (originally Hayy ibn Yaqdhan) (12th century) by Ibn Tufail
- Theologus Autodidactus (originally The Treatise of Kāmil on the Prophet's Biography) (1268) by Ibn al-Nafis
- Divine Comedy (1320) by Dante Alighieri
- The Marrow of Modern Divinity (1645) by Edward Fisher
- Paradise Lost (1667) by John Milton
- The Pilgrim's Progress (1678) by John Bunyan
- The Betrothed (1827) by Alessandro Manzoni
- The Brothers Karamazov (1880) by Fyodor Dostoevsky
- Quo Vadis (1895) by Henryk Sienkiewicz
- Lord of the World (1907) by Robert Hugh Benson
- Under the Sun of Satan (1926), The Diary of a Country Priest (1936) by Georges Bernanos
- Death Comes for the Archbishop (1927) by Willa Cather
- The Bridge of San Luis Rey (1927) by Thornton Wilder
- Descent into Hell (1937) by Charles Williams
- Brighton Rock (1938), The Power and the Glory (1940), The Heart of the Matter (1948), The End of the Affair (1951) by Graham Greene
- Brideshead Revisited (1945) by Evelyn Waugh
- The Screwtape Letters (1942), The Great Divorce (1945), The Lion, the Witch and the Wardrobe (1950) by C. S. Lewis
- The Violent Bear It Away (1960) by Flannery O'Connor
- Silence (1966) by Shūsaku Endō
- Gilead (2004) by Marilynne Robinson
- The Shack (2007) by William P. Young

== Linked series of theological fiction ==
Individual stories can be linked in series to constitute a composite novel or a short story cycle, where a group of stories interact to convey a richer or fuller story than any of the single elements can.

Examples of linked series of theological fiction include:

- The Journey Series by Richard P Belcher. It comprises 20 novels exploring Calvinist Theology.

== See also ==
- Christian novel
- Fictional religion
- Klerykal fiction
- List of Christian novels
- List of Catholic authors
- Religious fiction
