= Western romance literature =

Literary genre

- Cultural origins: America
- Formats: Novel, magazine and film
- Authors: Zane Grey, James Fenimore Cooper, Catharine Sedgwick

Related genres
- Romance fiction, Western fiction

Western romance literature denotes a genre subset of romance literature, sometimes referred to as cowboy romance. Works within this category typically adhere to the characteristics of romance but take place in a western setting, frequently the American frontier. Though often historical, the genre is not restricted to romantic works set in the period of American settlement but extends to contemporary romantic works that centre around cowboys or other tropes of the Western genre.

The genre originated in the 1800s, popularised by the works of Bret Harte, Zane Grey and Catharine Sedgwick who wrote love stories about cowboys and their heroines, and often their conflict with Native Americans. The genre gained mass readership in the 1950s with the rise of ranch romance magazines and in modern day, the Western romance pulp fiction novel like that published by Mills and Boon or Harlequin.

These stories typically follow the romance of a cowboy, ranch hand or bull rider and his heroine, contrasting the fragility of love with the severity of the harsh landscape. They're usually set on the American frontier, rurally, in a ranch or on a farm. The genre also appears throughout original and adapted films, such as Last of the Mohicans (1992), Brokeback Mountain (2006), The Longest Ride (2015) and Shane (1953).

== 1800s-1950s ==
=== Wister, Grey, Harte, Cooper and male writers ===
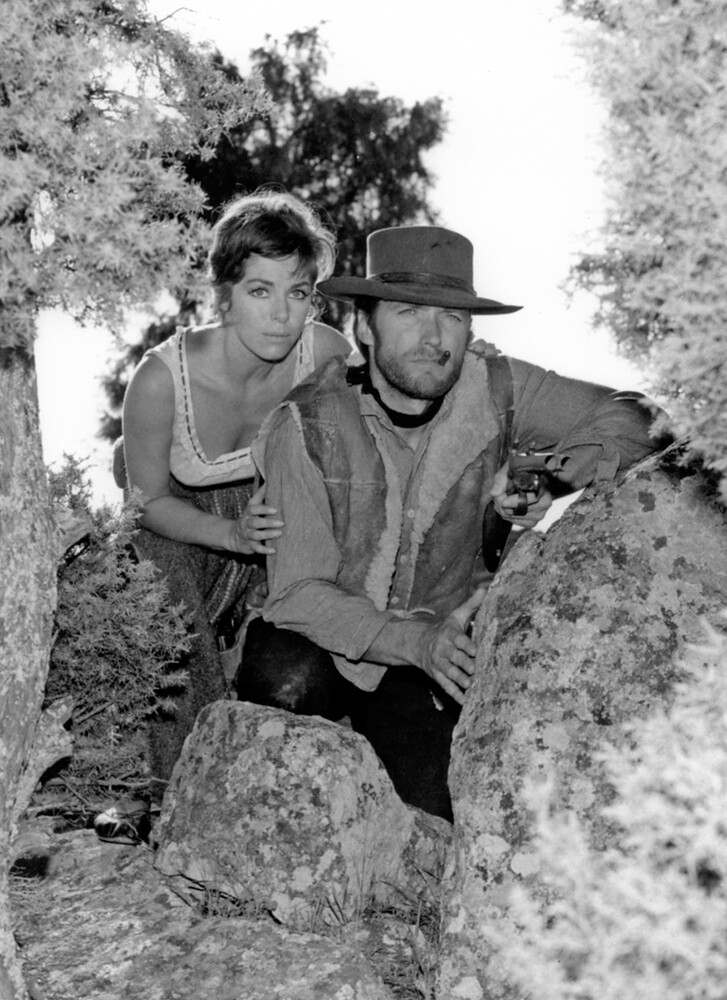
Marianne Koch and Clint Eastwood in Sergio Leone's A Fistful of Dollars (1964).

The Western romance genre dates back to the early 1800s with the rise of the classic cowboy and the pursuit of his heroine. Authors such as Zane Grey, Bret Harte and James Fenimore Cooper dominated this period.

Before the genre peaked in the early 1900s, authors such as Owen Wister and Sir Walter Scott paved the way for the rise of the Western romance genre. Grey was influenced by the likes of Wister, specifically by Wister's most famous novel, The Virginian (1902). It celebrated romance on the American frontier and oscillated, (as is characteristic of the genre) between the beauty of a woman's love and the treachery and violence of the landscape. Wister's work was characterised by his intermeshing of romance conventions with social realism, incorporating ideas of class and heritage to reflect the concerns of his time

It was within their work that the “Indian killing, heroine rescuing” cowboy came to be. Grey became known for his work in this genre (under the publisher, Harper's) and the hugely successful Western Romantic novel Riders of the Purple Sage (1912). The novel centres around a cowboy named Lassister and his relationship with his virginal heroine, Jane, set against the backdrop of the severe American frontier. According to Danney Goble, it was “Grey's combination of brutal violence and saccharine romance - a heady mixture all but unknown to his predecessors in the writing of frontier fiction – [that] established his claim to a gold mine which he exploited time and again”. Many critics suggest Grey's romances offered a vision of hope in America, the triumph of good over evil, the unity of the cowboy and his heroine and the prevailing of traditional values in a world rocked by war and social upheaval.

James Fenimore Cooper was another influential writer of Western romance fiction in the 19th century as was Bret Harte, both having become known for furthering the myth of the idealised cowboy in Romantic literature. Cooper has been credited as the father of Western literature, and a pioneer in Western romance writing specifically. His 1826 novel, The Last of the Mohicans (the second instalment of three in The Leather Stocking Tales) is considered one of the most beloved works within the genre. In fact, the 1993 film adaptation also gained great success. The Last of the Mohicans created the framework for Western romance literature from then on, establishing tropes like the ‘captive heroine’, adhering to ideologies of 19th century America that praised progress and reflected a changing relationship with Native Americans.

=== Portrayal of Native Americans ===
According to Cheri Ross, the portrayal of Native Americans in traditional Western romances is fundamentally racist and tinged with white American patriotism. The Indian is conventionally the clear villain, often the captor of the cowboy's heroine and portrayed as savage and violent. However, as writer Ernest Stromberg has pointed out, the depiction of Native Americans in Western romance has changed over time. Western romance films from the 1990s such as Dances with Wolves were revered for their positive portrayal of Native Indian characters. In the case of Dances with Wolves, many critics noted that the American Indians were portrayed as multi-dimensional characters, imbued with audience's sympathy and worked to demystify the white depiction of Western expansion. The film was not only critically praised but achieved commercial success too. Although, as Stromberg notes, Dances With Wolves does adhere to old-fashioned conventions of romance as the story is led by two white protagonists.

=== Sedgwick, Grey and early feminist approaches to the genre ===
Though male writers dominated the Western romance genre during its early iteration, female writers like Catharine Sedgwick had success too. Sedgwick is best known for her novel Hope Leslie (1827) and its experimentation with the popular form. Sedgwick's novels both adhered to conventions of Romantic literature and the marriage plot yet offered unconventional portrayals of women and American Indians, through a non-racist lens.

Western romance has been popular with female audiences since its inception. It was written of Zane Grey's Riders of the Purple Sage that “the publisher initially rejected the manuscript because of its harsh treatment of polygamy and the Mormon hierarchy, but the reluctance was overcome after an enthusiastic reading by the publisher’s wife”. Contrastingly, feminist scholars such as Madelon E. Heatherington have criticised early Western romance writers such as Owen Wister and Zane Grey for their stereotypical female characters and adherence to a binary between good, pure female characters and bad, unlikeable female characters.

According to Goble, Zane Grey's heroines tended to differ from the typical portrayal of a love interest in the 20th century, namely lacking the autonomy women of this time were gaining. His love interests were largely depicted to be reliant on their hero and morally pure. In Riders of the Purple Sage, among many of Grey's other works, the heroine's beauty and virtue contrasts the savage frontier. Recurringly throughout his writing, Grey envisioned a delicate ranch woman who, through such virtue, attempted to tame her mannish hero. His heroine, Patricia Edgerton of The Deer Stalker (1925) rejected modernity and the ‘New Woman’ in her dress and attitudes, forgoing styles that had become popular at the turn of the century, such as short hair and smoking. Critics such as Gobble argue Grey's heroines were thus reflections of the simple, enduring, old world values of the West, rather than reflections of modern women.

== 1950s - Contemporary works ==
=== Ranch romances ===
The 1950s saw the rise of pulp Western romances in magazine form known as ranch romances or rangeland love stories. In keeping with the genre, these magazines generally depicted love stories centering around cowboys and their heroines. Ranch romances remained popular during the Great Depression and continued to be published into the 1970s. Though ranch romances were predominantly written by men, they were distinct for their heroines known as “your sister”. These women embodied a departure from traditional female roles through their independence and courage while maintaining their femininity.

=== Contemporary pulp Western romances ===
During the 1970s the consumption of Western romance shifted from magazine to novel form. Publishers, Harlequin and Mills & Boon published novels for their predominantly female readership focusing on female desire and fantasy. Western romance as a genre flourished within the structure of the pulp fiction novel, generally written simply for easy reading. Cowboy romances such as these are extremely popular for their “rugged individualism…unadorned masculinity…and ultimate heroism” as William W Savage Jr. notes in his book, The Cowboy Hero: His Image in American History and Culture. Cowboys have traditionally been perceived as All American, associated with courage and old world chivalry. While these pulp novels have been criticised for their overt sexualisation of both male and female characters, gaining the title “bodice rippers”, other scholars have defended pulp Western romances for their female heroines and female driven plots.

=== Feminism in Contemporary Pulp Western romances ===
There has been some contention over the portrayal of women in contemporary Western romance novels. Scholars such as Lee Tobin-McLain have criticised historical romances in general for their, at times, glorified depiction of sexual violence. The genre earned the title of “bodice ripper” in the early 1980s among a group of feminist writers led by Janice Radway. Radway criticised the genre for its frequent depiction of aggressive male heroes and submissive heroines.

On the contrary, other scholars have noted that works within the genre, especially the novels published by Mills and Boon, are female led, praising them for their focus on female desire and fantasy. Mills and Boon romances generally emphasise the heroine's journey, her fears, motivations and aspirations and are typically written from a female perspective. In this way they differ from pure Western works which almost exclusively centre around a male protagonist and written for a male audience. What's more, Tobin-McClain himself notes it is increasingly rare for recent Western romance novels to depict such violence.

=== Australian and Canadian rural romances ===
Western romance literature extends beyond American settings. Canadian and Australian rural romance literature has also become increasingly popular, paralleling the American frontier and adhering to the same tropes and imagery. Australian outback romances centre around the heroine, her love interest and the severity of the unconquered landscape. They range in setting from the early colonisation of Australia to contemporary stories set on farms and ranches. According to Lauren O’Mahoney, these types of Western romances tend to be much darker. They emphasise a sense of mortality that is echoed in the severity of the outback where the closeness of death is constantly apparent. Tragedy is a far more prevalent element of Australian rural romances in which suicide, forbidden love and hopelessness are key tropes, as illustrated in Rachel Treasure's iconic Australian rural romance novel, Jillaroo (2002).

=== Hybridity of genre ===
The Western romance genre is by its nature a hybrid of Western and romantic literature and it is often categorized as a subset of the former or latter. The Western genre is highly distinct, containing its own specific tropes, iconography, themes and style. Works classified as Westerns often bleed into many genres, categorised by sub genres such as frontier drama, melodrama, comedy, musical and romance.

Cheri Ross surmises the conventions of traditional, early works within the genre as established by 1824. Such Western romances stories tended to adhere to categories which blend the two wider genres: often led by a patriotic American ideology, a clear division between good and evil characters, a submissive heroine in need of rescue (held captive by the villainous American Indians) and the unity of the cowboy and his heroine at the narrative's conclusion.

Western romances can be categorized into even more specific sub-genre classifications. These include the traditional Western romance which often incorporates tropes like saloons and bank robberies, contemporary Western romances set in modern-day on a ranch or farm and Amish or faith based Western romances.

=== Original and adapted films ===
The Western romance genre extends beyond literature, to a wide range of films. Western romance films had their beginning in popular movies such as Shane (1953), which took place in a traditional, rural setting. Director, Sergio Leone is often regarded as having invented the Spaghetti Western film, his Westerns generally intersecting romance and drama. His most famous Western romance films include The Good the Bad and the Ugly (1966) and Once Upon a Time in the West (1968). In the 1980s and 1990s the genre had great resurgence with the success of The Last of the Mohicans (1992) and Dances with Wolves (1990). In contemporary cinema, Western romances have been known to experiment with traditional conventions of romance. Films including Brokeback Mountain (2005), Desert Hearts (1985) and Midnight Cowboy (1969) centre around same sex romances (though in the third example it is only implied). In films such as Brokeback Mountain, the unconventional same sex love plot contrasts the severity of the American West and conservative society in 1950s America. Their romance represents the division between freedom and civilization, typical of Western romance stories.
