= Contemporary romance =

Literary genre

Contemporary romance is a subgenre of contemporary and romance novels that have been published after 1945 and the Second World War. Contemporary romance is generally set contemporaneously with the time of its writing. The largest of the romance novel subgenres, contemporary romance novels usually reflect the mores of their time. Heroines in the contemporary romances written before 1970 usually quit working when they married or had children, while those novels written after 1970 usually have, and keep, a career. As contemporary romance novels have grown to contain more complex plotting and more realistic characters, the line between this subgenre and the genre of women's fiction has blurred.

Most contemporary romance novels contain elements that date the books, and the majority of them eventually become irrelevant to more modern readers and go out of print. Those that survive the test of time, such as the works of Jane Austen are often reclassified as historical romances. In a 2014 survey of romance readers, contemporary romance made up 41% of print and 44% of eBook sales compared to other romance subgenres.

== Subgenres ==
Contemporary romance novels may, in turn, be categorized into several subgenres, sometimes mixing with other main subgenres of romance novels.

Subgenres include:

- General contemporary romance
- Contemporary romantic suspense
- Christian romance
- Contemporary fantasy romance
- Contemporary paranormal romance
- Medical romance
- Cowboy contemporary romance
- Glamour and jet set
- Humorous contemporary romance
- International lovers
- Love in the workplace
- Vacation love
- Lesbian romance
- Male/Male romance
- Amnesia, that is memory loss, often includes some former relationship
- "Bonkbusters", a subgenre of commercial romance novels from the 1970s and 1980s.

=== Contemporary romantic suspense ===
The subgenre of contemporary romantic suspense consists of literary works that feature both elements of romance and suspense.

=== Christian romance ===
This subgenre is also referred to as inspirational romance, often including themes and characters dealing with the Christian faith.

=== Contemporary paranormal romance ===
The subgenre of contemporary paranormal romance consists of literary works that feature both elements of romance and the supernatural.

=== Medical romance ===
Medical romance novels may generally be regarded as a subcategory of contemporary romance, as well as of medical fiction, but has their type of setting and characters, although they yet can be as multifarious as any other subgenre. The setting usually involves a medical workplace, often the emergency department, but also airborne medicine, family medicine and obstetrics and gynecology.

Regarding characters, the central male protagonists (heroes) are almost always medical doctors, mostly emergency physicians, primary care physicians or surgeons, and sometimes obstetricians/neonatologists or pediatricians. The female protagonists (heroines) are mostly medical doctors but also often nurses, working in primary care, obstetrics/neonatology, training or residency programs, surgery, anesthesiology or emergency medicine. The doctors are almost always ingenious, the men usually tallish, husky and chiseled, while nurses are strong but caring.

Patients bring a lot of potential for subplots. They mostly get completely recovered, regardless of the severity of their injury or disease. Romantic practitioner-patient relationships are rarely broached in many mainstream works due to an unbalanced power dynamic and the patient's own health concerns, but are more common in other works such as fanfiction.

The plot often includes pregnancy and children.

=== Lesbian romance ===
This subgenre is an important part of literature and has been prevalent since the mid-1700s. The lesbian romance genre is often a subgenre of broader genres such as BDSM romance, paranormal romance, coming-of-age romance, fantasy romance, and inspirational romance.

== Critical reception ==
Contemporary romance novels have twice been chosen by Kelly Ripa to be featured in her Reading with Ripa book club.

== See also ==
- Romance novel
