= Parable of the Sower (novel) =

1993 novel by Octavia E. Butler

- Cover of first edition (hardback)
- Author: Octavia E. Butler
- Language: English
- Series: Parable duology
- Genre: Post-apocalyptic fiction Dystopian fiction
- Publisher: Four Walls Eight Windows
- Publication date: 1993
- Publication place: United States
- Media type: Print (hardback and paperback)
- Pages: 299 (first edition, hardback)
- ISBN: 0-941423-99-9 (first edition, hardback)
- OCLC: 28255529
- Dewey Decimal: 813/.54 20
- LC Class: PS3552.U827 P37 1993
- Followed by: Parable of the Talents

Parable of the Sower is a 1993 speculative fiction novel by American writer Octavia E. Butler. It is set in a post-apocalyptic Earth heavily affected by climate change and social inequality. The novel follows Lauren Olamina, a young woman who can feel the pain of others and becomes displaced from her home. Several characters from various walks of life join her on her journey north and learn of a religion she has envisioned and titled Earthseed. The main tenets of Earthseed are that "God is Change" and believers can "shape God" through conscious effort to influence the changes around them. Earthseed also teaches that it is humanity's destiny to inhabit other planets and spread the "seeds" of the Earth.

Parable of the Sower was the winner of multiple awards, including the 1994 New York Times Notable Book of the Year, and has been adapted into an opera and a graphic novel. Parable of the Sower has influenced music and essays on social justice as well as climate change. In 2021, it was picked by readers of The New York Times as the top science fiction nomination for the best book of the last 125 years.

Parable of the Sower is the first in an unfinished series of novels, followed by Parable of the Talents in 1998. Butler died before she could complete the third novel in the series, Parable of the Trickster.

== Plot ==
Beginning in 2024, when society in the United States has grown unstable due to climate change, growing wealth inequality, and corporate greed, Parable of the Sower takes the form of a journal kept by Lauren Oya Olamina, an African American teenager. Her mother abused intellectual performance-enhancing drugs during her pregnancy and left Lauren with "Hyper-empathy" or "sharing": the uncontrollable ability to feel the sensations she witnesses in others, particularly the abundant pain in her world.

Lauren grows up in the remnants of a gated community in the fictional town of Robledo, California, twenty miles from Los Angeles, where she and her neighbors struggle but are separate from the abject poverty of the world outside. Outside of the community are numerous homeless and mutilated individuals who resent the community members for their relative affluence. Public services such as police or firefighters are untrustworthy, exploiting their positions for profit and making little effort to help. Lauren's father, a Baptist pastor and college professor, holds the community together through Baptist religion, mutual aid, and careful use of resources, such as making bread from acorns. However, Lauren is increasingly certain that despite all efforts, society will continue to deteriorate and the community will no longer be safe; Lauren secretly prepares to travel north, as many do in search of rare paid jobs. The newly elected radical, authoritarian President Donner loosens labor protections, creating a rise in company towns owned by foreign businesses. Lauren privately develops her own new belief system based on the belief that "God is Change" is the only lasting truth, and that humanity should "shape God" in order to aid themselves. She comes to call this religion Earthseed.

Lauren's younger half-brother, Keith, rebelliously runs away to live outside the walls of the community. For a time, he survives by joining a group of ruthless thieves who value him for his rare literacy, but he is eventually found dead after torture. Later, Lauren's father disappears while leaving the community for work and is accepted as dead.

In 2027, when Lauren is eighteen, the community's security is breached in an organized attack by outsiders: most of the community is destroyed, looted, and murdered, including Lauren's family. She travels north, disguised as a man, with Harry Balter and Zahra Moss, two survivors from her community. Society outside the community walls has reverted to chaos due to resource scarcity and poverty. U.S. states have become akin to city-states with strict borders. Money still has value, but travelers constantly fear attacks for resources or by pyromaniac drug-users, cannibals, and wild dogs. Interracial relationships are stigmatized, women fear sexual assault, and slavery has returned in the form of indentured servitude.

Lauren gathers runaway servants and other vagabonds and begins to share her Earthseed religion. She meets other "sharers", some of which had their sensitivities exploited in their servitude. Along this route, Lauren meets Travis and Natividad, former servants who travel with their infant son Dominic. They meet Allie and Jill Gilchrist in their home after it was destroyed by a fire. One of the sisters goes on to adopt an orphaned boy, Justin Rohr, who the group finds on the road near his deceased mother. Grayson Mora, a runaway slave, joins the group reluctantly with his young daughter Emery.

Earthseed develops into a collection of texts titled Earthseed: The Books of the Living. She believes that humankind's destiny is to travel beyond the deteriorating Earth and live on other planets, forcing humankind into its adulthood, and that Earthseed is preparation for this destiny. Lauren's group meets an older doctor, Bankole, who reminds Lauren of her father. Bankole joins the group and Lauren finds herself attracted to him even though he is nearly 40 years older than she. They begin a sexual relationship and agree to marry. Bankole takes the group to the land he owns in northern California near Cape Mendocino, where the group settles and Lauren founds the first Earthseed community, Acorn.

The novel concludes with an excerpt from the Biblical Parable of the Sower.

== Sequel novels ==
The sequel to Parable of the Sower, Parable of the Talents, was published in 1998.

Butler began to write a third Parable novel, tentatively titled Parable of the Trickster, which would have focused on an Earthseed community's struggle to survive on a new planet. Along with the third novel, Butler was planning several others titled Parable of the Teacher, Parable of Chaos, and Parable of Clay. She began Parable of the Trickster after finishing Parable of the Talents, and mentioned her work on it in a number of interviews, but at some point encountered writer's block. She eventually shifted her creative attention, resulting in Fledgling (2005), her final novel. The various false starts for the novel can now be found among Butler's papers at the Huntington Library, as described in an article at the Los Angeles Review of Books. Butler died in 2006, leaving the series unfinished.

== Publication and award history ==
Published by Four Walls Eight Windows in 1993, by Women's Press Ltd. in 1995, by Warner in 1995 and 2000, and by Seven Stories Press in 2017.

- 2020 – became a New York Times best seller on September 3, 2020, appearing on the Trade Paperback Fiction list.
- 1995 – nominated for Nebula Award for Best Novel
- 1994 – New York Times Notable Book of the Year

== Adaptations ==
Parable of the Sower was adapted into an opera by American folk/blues musician Toshi Reagon in collaboration with her mother, singer and composer Bernice Johnson Reagon. The adaptation's libretto and musical score combine African-American spirituals, soul, rock and roll, and folk music. An early concert version of the opera was performed as part of The Public Theater's Under the Radar Festival in New York City in 2015. The finished version had its world premiere in Abu Dhabi in November 2017 and has been performed in cities such as Boston, New York City, Los Angeles, Singapore, and Amsterdam.

In 2020, Parable of the Sower was adapted into a graphic novel by Damian Duffy and John Jennings, the team which had previously adapted Butler's novel Kindred, and published by Abrams ComicArts. The graphic novel was named to the Black Lives Matter Reading Lists compiled by the Graphic Novels & Comics Round Table and the Black Caucus of the American Library Association, and was also included in the top ten of the Graphic Novels & Comics Round Table's 2020 list of Best Graphic Novels for Adults. It went on to win the 2021 Ignyte Award for Best Comics Team and the 2021 Hugo Award for Best Graphic Story.

== In popular culture ==
In 2015, adrienne maree brown and Walidah Imarisha co-edited Octavia's Brood: Science Fiction Stories from Social Justice Movements, a collection of 20 short stories and essays about social justice inspired by Butler. In June 2020, Brown and Toshi Reagon began hosting the podcast Octavia's Parables, which gives an in-depth dive into Parable of the Sower and Parable of the Talents.

The book is read by characters in the 2024 post-apocalyptic film 40 Acres.

== See also ==
- Climate fiction
