= Earthseed =

Fictional religion in Octavia Butler's works

Earthseed is a fictitious religion based on the idea that "God is Change". It is the creation of Octavia E. Butler, as revealed by her character Lauren Oya Olamina in the books Parable of the Sower and Parable of the Talents (the third book of the trilogy, Parable of the Trickster, was not completed before Butler's death).

== Background ==
Parable of the Sower is a futuristic, dystopian, science fiction novel. In its reality, the United States has fragmented into states and/or city-states warring for the few remaining resources. Life is cheap, and the economy is becoming reborn as company towns.

The main character in Parable of the Sower, Lauren Olamina, is the daughter of a Baptist minister who serves their walled-in neighborhood. Because of her mother's addiction to a prescription drug, Olamina suffers from "hyperempathy", which causes her to share pain and pleasure with any living human she sees. When her community is attacked, burned, and looted, seventeen-year-old Olamina barely escapes with her life. She travels, at great danger, into Northern California in search of a haven where she and others can build the first Earthseed community.

The beliefs of Earthseed are recorded in the fictional book Earthseed: The Books of the Living. Olamina writes in short, poetic passages. Portions of this text are presented at the beginning of each section, some chapters, and occasionally throughout the text. The philosophy of Earthseed also underlies the motivations of some of the characters in these novels.

== Central tenets ==
The word "Earthseed" comes from the idea that the seeds of all life on Earth can be transplanted, and through adaptation will grow, in many different types of situations or places. "The Books of the Living" is chosen in direct contrast to many other religions' use of the phrase "The Books of the Dead". Earthseed is a religion of the present and the future, of the living, not of the dead or the past.

Although Olamina is raised as a Baptist, she does not feel comfortable with "her father's God." Instead, she develops ideas that seem to better fit the reality she knows.

Because "God is Change", humans are able to direct God's malleability. Believers are enjoined to "shape God". By shaping themselves, they can save themselves. Believers are to accept the central tenet that "God is Change" primarily so that they will recognize their own power to affect and direct Change/God. Only by conscious effort can they avoid being God's victims.

Earthseed also promotes the belief that "The Destiny of Earthseed / Is to take root among the stars" (The Parable of the Sower, Octavia E. Butler). The Destiny is necessary because, eventually, we will outgrow Earth (i.e., use up its natural resources).

The central verse of Earthseed is given in the following:

Consider: Whether you're a human being, an insect, a microbe, or a stone, this verse is true.

All that you touch
You Change.

All that you Change
Changes you.

The only lasting truth
Is Change.

God
Is Change.

— Octavia E. Butler, Parable of the Sower

The central paradox of Earthseed is:

Why is the universe?
To shape God.

Why is God?
To shape the universe.

— Octavia Butler, Parable of the Sower

== Influence ==
While fictitious, the religion has inspired several real-world movements. The Terasem Movement seeks the development of humanity through technology, and to bridge the gap between science and religion. Terasem comes from the Latin Terra ('earth') and sēmen ('seed'). Like the fictional Earthseed, Terasem Movement attempts to "shape God", but through technology.
