= Little Prince =

Little Prince may refer to:

- The Little Prince, French writer and aviator Antoine de Saint-Exupéry's most famous novella and the eponymously named character within the story, or other versions of the story adapted for various media, including:
  - The Little Prince (1974 film), a 1974 musical film directed by Stanley Donen
  - The Little Prince, a 1979 animated short by Will Vinton
  - Little Prince (2008 film), a 2008 South Korean film directed by Choi Jong-hyun
  - The Little Prince (2015 film), a 2015 animated fantasy film directed by Mark Osborne
  - The Little Prince (play), a theatrical adaptation
  - The Little Prince (opera), a 2003 opera in two acts by Rachel Portman to an English libretto by Nicholas Wright
  - The Adventures of The Little Prince (TV series), an anime series
  - The Little Prince (2010 TV series)
  - The Little Prince and the Aviator, a 1981 musical theatre adaptation
  - List of The Little Prince adaptations, a listing of The Little Prince story adapted into various media
- Petit-Prince (moon) (English: Little Prince), a small moon orbiting asteroid 69 Eugenia, named jointly in honour of the French Empress Eugénie's son, the Prince Imperial, and as allusion to the eponymously named Saint-Exupéry novella The Little Prince
- Little Prince (chief) (also named: Tastanaki Hopayi and Tustanagee Hopae, died 1832), chieftain and longtime representative of the Muscogee (Lower Creeks) tribe in the United States
- "Little Prince" (Miami Vice), episode of the 1980s undercover cop television series Miami Vice
- "The Little Prince" (Lost), 2009 episode in the fifth season of the American television series Lost
- The Little Prince (EP), a 2016 extended play (EP) by South Korean singer Kim Ryeowook, a member from boy band Super Junior
- The Little Prince (Fear the Walking Dead), an episode of the television series Fear the Walking Dead
- Little Prince (sculpture), a 1995 copper and steel sculpture by Ilan Averbuch

== See also ==
- The Happy Prince (disambiguation)
- Little Princess (disambiguation)
- Petit Prince (disambiguation)
- Prince (disambiguation)
