= Geoff Sewell =

New Zealand singer (born 1972)

Geoffrey David Sewell
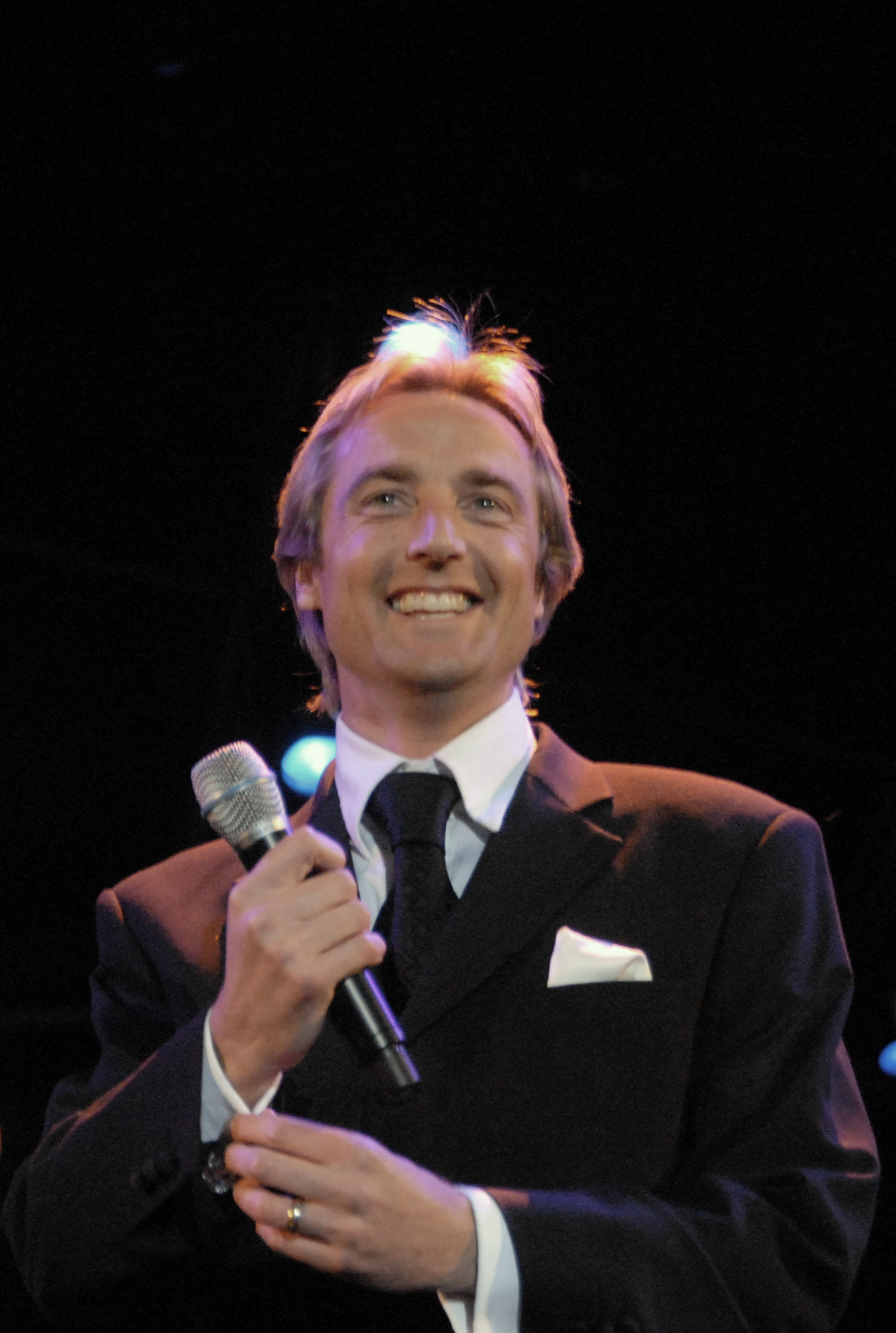

Background information
- Born: 13 March 1972 (age 54)
- Origin: New Zealand
- Genres: Classical music, opera, Pop-Opera
- Occupations: Recording artist, entrepreneur, ceo of Incognito Artists
- Instrument: Voice (Tenor)
- Label: Incognito Artists
- Formerly of: Amici Forever
- Website: www.geoffsewell.co.uk

Geoffrey David Sewell (born 13 March 1972) is a classical crossover singer, impresario, and entrepreneur from New Zealand. He is the founder and CEO of London-based entertainment company Incognito Artists, as well as co-creator of pop-opera band Amici Forever.

== Early life and education ==
Sewell was born in Wellington. His older sister Julie died when she was 22. Sewell credits her loss as his inspiration to pursue his dreams of a singing career.

He was educated at Plimmerton Primary School in Wellington, Havelock North Intermediate and Havelock North High School, Hawke's Bay. He was a boy soprano in the school choir, and later took singing lessons from New Zealand opera singer Geoffrey De la Tour while working in Wellington as a chartered accountant. He gained a Bachelor of Commerce degree at the Victoria University of Wellington. Sewell attended the Boston Conservatory of Music in the United States, studying opera and musical theatre.

== Career ==
Sewell worked as a chartered accountant in New Zealand with the National Bank and later in London at Salomon Smith Barney. He worked part-time at recruitment companies Robert Walters and Joslin Rowe in London, while also performing in the West End, before leaving to start up his own company.

Sewell, his wife Simone Lanham and creative manager Tim Rogers created Incognito Artists in London in 2000. Sewell is Global CEO and tenor of the company, which creates surprise performances and full concerts.

Sewell moved to London, England, in 1997 after completing his studies at the Boston Conservatory of Music in the United States. After arriving in London, he performed on the West End and got into the music business with his wife. He founded the group Tenors Incognito and then other variations of the group before ultimately the duo founded the classical crossover group Amici Forever in 2002. The original line-up consisted of two tenors (Sewell, David Habbin), a baritone-bass (Nick Garrett), and two soprano singers (Jo Appleby, Tsakane Valentine).

Sewell has had three No.1 albums with Amici's The Opera Band and Defined, and his own solo debut, Believe, reaching over 3.5 million album sales worldwide. He toured New Zealand with Incognito Artists and achieved a No.1 selling DVD with his Live in Concert DVD. He has toured and had chart success in the United Kingdom, America, Japan, Singapore, Australia and New Zealand.

With Amici Forever, he was nominated for a Classical Brit Award in the UK for best album.

He has sung for the late Queen Elizabeth II, King Charles III, Princes William and Harry and members of the Royal Family at the Royal Albert Hall, Windsor Castle and other venues; Nelson Mandela; and various celebrities such as Elton John, Leonardo DiCaprio and Victoria and David Beckham.

Despite the success of Amici Forever, Sewell left the group suddenly after his eldest daughter Sienna was diagnosed with an autism spectrum disorder (ASD) in 2006. He sidelined his music career for a couple years before releasing his solo album debut, Believe, produced by Nick Patrick, in 2008. Sewell then publicised autism awareness; he released Believe on the date of his daughter's fifth birthday, and discussed treating autism in media interviews.

He is an ambassador of the St. James Theatre in London, which opened in September 2012.

== Sporting anthems ==
He has performed the national anthems at the FA Cup Final, the Champions League Final, the Rugby World Cup, the Rugby League World Cup final, the Six Nations, various rugby fixtures at Twickenham, at the ASB Tennis Classic in Auckland, NZ and on centre court at Wimbledon.

== Awards ==
With Amici Forever, Sewell was nominated for a Classical Brit Award in the UK for best album. Sewell has won various accolades for his performance and philanthropic activities during his career, including Air NZ New Zealander of the Year runner up, International Young Chartered Accountant of the Year and the youngest ever NZ Chartered Accountant to be awarded Fellowship status, FCA. In October 2018, he was presented with the International Achievement Award from the Variety Artists Club of New Zealand.

== Charity work ==
Sewell established The Geoff & Simone Sewell Foundation 2010 (NZ) helping families in New Zealand to treat their children affected by autism. Sewell and Lanham believe recovery is possible using child-centric, appropriate healing interventions because of their own experience with their daughter.

Sewell personally supports charitable organisations Treating Autism (UK), the Autism Trust (UK) and the National Society of Epilepsy (UK), as well as orchestrating hundreds of appearances and contributions to charitable events around the world as part of Incognito Artists since 2000.

== Discography ==
=== Albums ===
List of albums, with Australian chart positions
| Title | Album details | Peak chart positions | |
| Title | Album details | NZ | AUS |
|---|---|---|---|
| Believe | Released: April 2008; Format: CD; Label: Sewell Music, Sony (8869-729321-2) | 2 | 13 |
| Live, Love, Sing ! | Released: April 2014; Format: CD; Label: Sewell Music | 4 | — |

== Concerts ==
- FA Cup Final, Cardiff, Wales 2002
- Champions League Final, Manchester, England 2003
- Amici Forever – numerous tours of the UK, Australia, America, New Zealand, Singapore, Japan – 2003, 2004, 2005, 2006
- Geoff Sewell and Incognito Artists tour of New Zealand, 2009
- Christmas in the Park Auckland, NZ 2007
- Classical Proms Christchurch, NZ 2008
- Serenata, Classical Festival, Dorset, England 2010
- Charity concert for Project K, Craggy Range, Hawke's Bay, NZ 2011
- Geoff Sewell and Bravo Amici, Lynn University, Boca Raton, USA 2012
- Geoff Sewell and Bravo Amici, Lynn University, Boca Raton, USA 2013
- ASB Tennis Classic, Auckland, NZ 2013
- Geoff Sewell and Incognito Artists, St James Theatre – April, May, July, September, October; London 2013
- Geoff Sewell and Bravo Amici, Moscow 2013
- Bravo Amici, 16 tour dates in Florida, 2014
