= List of The Little Prince adaptations =

This list of The Little Prince adaptations is based on the novella of the same name (original title: Le Petit Prince) by the French writer, poet and aviator Antoine de Saint-Exupéry.

The illustrated book was first published in 1943. The novella is both the most read and most translated book in the French language, and was voted the best book of the 20th century in France. Translated into more than 250 languages and dialects (including braille), selling close to two million copies per year with sales totalling more than 140 million copies worldwide, it has become one of the best-selling books ever published.

Due to the story's wide appeal, the novella has been adapted into various media over the decades, including audio recordings, graphic novel, movie musicals, movie screen, animated series, live stage theatre, ballet and opera.

== Audio adaptations ==
=== Vinyl record ===
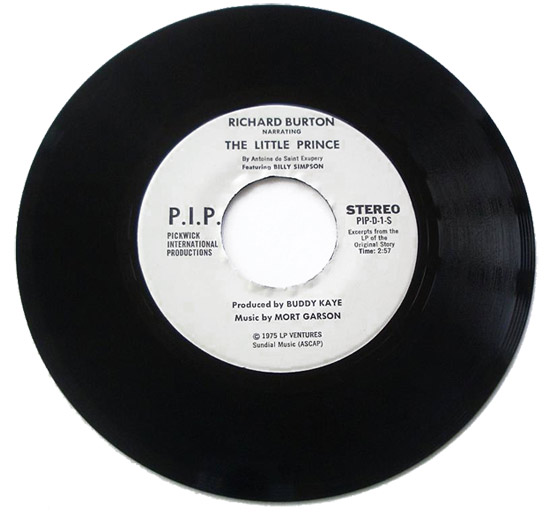
A short recording by Richard Burton narrating The Little Prince, excerpted from the longer 33 1/3 RPM vinyl record album. Burton won the Best Children's Album Grammy Award for his narration (1975).

- 1954: An audio adaptation, as a vinyl record, was made with the French actor Gérard Philipe in the role of The Narrator, Georges Poujouly as The Prince, Pierre Larquey in the role of The Lamplighter, Michel Roux in the role of The Serpent, Jacques Grello in the role of The Fox, and Sylvie Pelayo in the role of The Rose.
- 1956: A German adaptation on a Philips label double LP record album, narrated by Hardy Krüger
- 1972: An adaptation with Jean-Louis Trintignant in the role of narrator and Eric Damain in the role of The Prince
- 1972: An adaptation with Peter Ustinov reading all roles. (Argo ZSW 520-1)
- 1973: An adaptation with Marcel Mouloudji in the role of narrator and Eric Rémy in the role of The Prince.
- 1975: Actor Richard Burton won the Grammy Award for Best Album for Children for his narration of The Little Prince, featuring Jonathan Winters, Claudine Longet, and Billy Simpson. It was produced by Buddy Kaye with music by Mort Garson.
- 1978: A phono adaptation with Jean-Claude Pascal in the role of narrator was released.
- 1983: songs from the German version, Der kleine Prinz, by Kurt Demmler, and later produced in 1985 as a double LP on the Amiga label
- 1990: A phono adaptation with Pierre Arditi in the role of narrator and Benjamin Pascal in the role of The Prince was released.
- 1996: A Digital Quebec production with a musical score by Robert Normandeau was released. Actor Michel Dumont (as the Narrator–Aviator) is surrounded by an array of characters, including a young Martin Pensa who embodies the title role.

=== Radio broadcasts ===
- 1953: An adaptation by Jon Farrell, with incidental music composed by James Bernard, was broadcast on the BBC Light Programme on 20 December 1953.
- 1956: Raymond Burr starred in a radio adaptation of The Little Prince on The CBS Radio Workshop.
- 1974: Jon Farrell's adaptation, with Nigel Stock as Narrator and Gwyn Guthrie as The Little Prince, was broadcast on 13 April 1974 on BBC Radio 4 with incidental music by Wilma Paterson.
- 1999: BBC Radio 4 broadcast, on Christmas Day 1999 (and subsequently repeated), a dramatization by Bonnie Greer of a new translation into English of The Little Prince. Produced by Pam Fraser Solomon, and with music composed by Keith Waithe, the dramatization starred Robert Powell as the aviator and narrator, Garrett Moore as The Little Prince, and Bernard Cribbins as The King, The Drunkard, and The Lamplighter. It was repeated in May 2002. An audio cassette recording is available in the BBC Radio Collection series.

=== Cassette tape and CD ===
- 1959: An audio cassette adaptation in German, with Will Quadflieg in the role of narrator.
- 1994: Adapted to a CD, by Matthew Mancini and others, with music by Fabio Concato, directed by Marco Carniti, on the EMI label from Milan, Italy in 1994
- 1996: Marc André Coallier narrated Le Petit Prince, supported by Marc-André Grondin, Sophie Stanké, Paul Buissoneau, Ghislain Tremblay, Gaston Lepage, Jean-Pierre Gonthier and Gilbert Lachance. The accompanying music was performed by Alexandre Stanké.
- 1998: A CD adaptation is directed by Romain Victo-Pujebet, with rumors of Philippe Leroy, Lella Costa with original music by Olivier Priszlak, released in Paris by Gallimard and in Milan by Pontaccio.
- 1999: An audiobook adaptation on the Patmos label, read by Ulrich Mühe, wins a Preis der deutschen Schallplattenkritik award in 2000 (ISBN 3-491-24058-1).
- 2009: Hörbuch von Rausch (Ecstasy Audiobook) adaptation of Der kleine Prinz, with a new translation narrated by Jan Josef Liefers

== Film and television ==
- 1966: A Soviet–Lithuanian film adaptation Mažasis princas (Russian: Маленький принц), was made by Arūnas Žebriūnas.
- 1966: The German DDR network broadcasts a TV movie of Der Kleine Prinz by Konrad Wolf
- 1974: The first English film musical adaptation, titled The Little Prince, directed by Stanley Donen for Paramount Pictures, debuted to mixed reviews The film is notable chiefly in that it marked the third last "Lerner and Loewe" collaboration (referring to lyricist and librettist Alan Jay Lerner and composer Frederick Loewe), which was also their final musical. The authors were dissatisfied with the film's Hollywood treatment, with Loewe subsequently refusing to visit London to supervise the arrangement and recording of its musical score. The film was unsuccessful at the box office, but has become somewhat of a cult classic, featuring Bob Fosse, who choreographed his own dance sequences as The Snake, and Gene Wilder who played The Fox.
- 1978: The Adventures of the Little Prince, a Japanese animated series based on the book, aired in Europe and North America in the 1970s and 1980s. The show was made by the Knack animation studio and first aired in Japan in 1978 under the title Hoshi no Ōjisama Puchi Puransu (星の王子さま プチ・プランス; Prince of the Stars: Petit Prince). In it, the little prince often traveled to Earth to help people. During the 1980s, the English-language version was aired in the United States on ABC and then Nickelodeon, as internationally produced animation often was. The English version featured Julie Dees (later voiced by veteran voice actress Katie Leigh) in the role of the Little Prince and is available on DVD from Koch Vision.

1978: A Russian animated series Приключения Маленького принца (The Adventures of the Little Prince) is produced by Franklin Kofod.

- 1979: A Claymation short film adaptation titled The Little Prince was created by Will Vinton written by Susan Shadburne, featuring Cliff Robertson as the narrator-pilot.
- 1990: A 60-minute German ZDF animated film, Der Kleine Prinz, is produced by Theo Kerp, featuring the voices of Sabine Bohlmann, Joachim Hoeppner, and Cornelia Froboess.

1990: A French film adaptation is released as Le Petit Prince by Jean-Louis Guillermou, with Guy Gravis, Daniel Royan and Alexandre Warner.

- 2004: An operatic adaptation based on the music of Rachel Portman (featuring Willard White and Lesley Garrett) was broadcast on the UK's BBC Two television network on 27 November 2004, as a studio-filmed production starring Joseph McManners as The Prince and Teddy Tahu Rhodes as The Pilot, and later released as a DVD.
- 2010: Le Petit Prince is the title of a 2010 French animated television series of 52 episodes of 26 minutes each by Method Animation. The Little Prince is voiced by Gabriel Bismuth-Bienaimé, and The Rose by Marie Gillain.
- 2011: Oliver d'Agay of the Saint-Exupéry–d'Agay Estate, responsible for author's intellectual property and head of the Antoine de Saint-Exupéry Youth Foundation, reached an agreement with the author's original French publisher and others on creating updated adaptations of The Little Prince story. In the new adaptations, The Prince is made more attuned to children of the 21st century and include a new 3D animated movie, as well as the aforementioned new animated TV series in 52 parts, a new video game, and 100 serial print story editions. The TV series is produced in collaboration with France Télévisions, TV5 Monde, the Swiss Télévision Suisse Romande (TSR) and the Italian Rai Fiction, and licensed for distribution in many countries worldwide. The animated movie is titled as Le Petit Prince 4D, produced by nWave Pictures, with effects by Parc du Futuroscope.

2011: Der kleine Prinz is produced for DVD in Berlin, directed by Lorenz Christian Köhler.

- 2012: The Little Prince TV series was translated into Scottish Gaelic.
- 2015: The Little Prince was released in 2015 as an animated film. The film is directed by Mark Osborne with its script written by Irena Brignull and Bob Persichetti. The film stars James Franco, Rachel McAdams and Jeff Bridges.

2015: In the Turkish TV drama Eve Dönüş, it's mentioned that The Little Prince is a favorite book of 7-year-old Elif; as such, Pinar/Leyla is shown reading it to Elif at bedtime in episodes 1, 3 and 9, while it's also referenced during episodes 6, 7 and 8.

- 2023: A 2D-animated spin-off series The Little Prince & Friends produced by the studio who produced the original CGI series Method Animation and the Saint-Exupéry-d’Agay Estate. It premiered first in Italy on Rai Yoyo before premiering in its home country of France on September 1, 2023 on France 5.

== Ballet ==
The novella has been transformed into ballet productions on a number of occasions, including in:

- 1982: Malenkiy prints ballet with the music of Belarusian composer Yevgeniy Glebov is performed for the first time in Helsinki; next year it was also staged in the Bolshoi Theatre in Moscow, with Nina Ananiashvili in the cast.
- 1985: Der Kleine Prinz ballet is performed by the Gregor Seyffert Company Anhalt Theatre in Dessau, Germany
- 1987: The Los Angeles Chamber Ballet produced The Little Prince for two performances at the Orange County Performing Arts Center in Costa Mesa, California, choreographed the previous year by Victoria Koenig, Raiford Rogers, Patrick Frantz and Stanley Holden, with a musical score by Lloyd Rodgers.
- 2010: The Ballet d’Europe performed The Little Prince in a new ballet choreographed by Florencia Gonzalez and performed by nine dancers, with a score by René Aubry.
- 2012: Les Grands Ballets Canadiens produced the story as ballet, performed at Montreal's Place des Arts venue and choreography by Didy Veldman. It received a mixed reviews in the Toronto Globe and Mail, being said to suffer from "choreographic sameness and evenness of tone."
- 2014: The Hurjaruuth Dance Theater in Helsinki, Finland created a new production, with direction by Arja Pettersson, expressing the story's elements of friendship, loneliness, the search for happiness and the thrill of life in general, and also depicting adult idiosyncrasies.
- 2015: The National Ballet of Canada of Toronto, Ontario, Canada announced a future full-length adaptation of the story premiering in its 2015–16 season, to be choreographed by Guillaume Côté, with its score composed by Kevin Lau and its libretto written by Adam Gopnik.

== Graphic novel ==
- 2008: French artist Joann Sfar drew a graphic novel adaptation of The Little Prince that was released in 2008 by Éditions Gallimard in France.
- 2012–2015: see The Little Prince (2010 TV series)#Book series

== Operas and musical productions ==
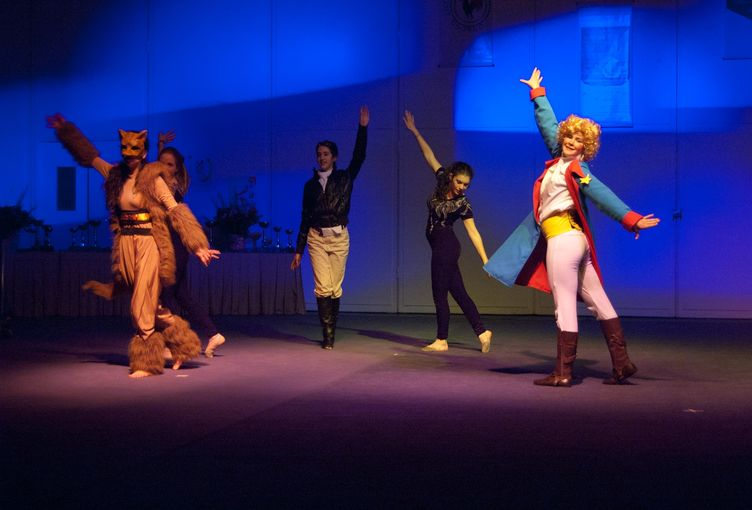
One of numerous live stage musical adaptations of Saint-Exupéry's child and adult fable, this one at the Lycée Antoine de Saint-Exupéry in Santiago, Chile (2011)

- 1964: Russian operatic composer Lev Knipper wrote a three-part symphony in 1962, his skazka (tale) entitled Malen′kiy Prints (The Little Prince), which was first performed in Moscow in 1978.
- 1981: A musical theatre adaptation entitled The Little Prince and the Aviator, co-produced by lawyer A. Joseph Tandet who held the rights to The Little Prince, with music composed by John Barry and directed by Jerry Adler. Previews began on 26 December 1981 at the Alvin Theatre. Choreographed by Billy Wilson, it starred Michael York as The Aviator and Anthony Rapp as The Prince, with Ellen Greene in a supporting role. The musical deviates from Saint-Exupéry's original story in that the aviator, Toni, whose plane crashes in the Sahara Desert, is explicitly in real-life the author (Saint-Exupéry), and the plot alternates flashbacks to actual events in his life with his interaction with the fictional Little Prince, a refugee from Asteroid B-612. After 16 preview shows the stage production closed on 17 January 1982, prior to its New York City Broadway debut.
- 1985 : Der Kleine Prinz opera with music by Michael Horwath and libretto by Barbara Hass, at the Theater des Westens
- 1987: Le Petit Prince as an opera by Vlad Opran, libretto by the composer; played at Romanian National Opera, Bucharest, published by Editura Muzicala in 1993.
- 2002: Le Petit Prince as a musical comedy by Richard Cocciante.
- 2003: Rachel Portman composed an English opera, The Little Prince, based on the book that had its stage premiere in 2003 at the Houston Grand Opera in Houston, Texas, starring Nate Irvin as The Prince and Teddy Tahu Rhodes in the role of The Pilot, receiving widespread critical acclaim. It was broadcast on the UK's BBC Two television network on November 27, 2004, as a studio-filmed production starring Joseph McManners as The Prince and Teddy Tahu Rhodes as The Pilot, and later released as a DVD by the BBC.
- 2003: Opera composer Nikolaus Schapfl composes, Der Kleine Prinz in German, after first obtaining the rights from the author's heirs in 1998. The opera is in two acts and calls for 11 soloists, chorus and orchestra. As of 2007, it has been performed 25 times in seven other European cities by five different orchestras and ensembles. In 2005, it was broadcast by Bavarian Classic Radio.
- 2004: An operatic version of The Little Prince was directed by Francesca Zambello and broadcast on the UK's BBC Two television network on 27 November 2004, as a studio-filmed production starring Joseph McManners as The Prince and Teddy Tahu Rhodes as The Pilot, and later released as a DVD by the BBC.
- 2015: A German musical version of "The Little Prince", produced by 3for1 Trinity Concerts GmbH in Lorsch, Germany, premiered at the Musical Theater Niedernhausen (Wiesbaden) on December 12/2015. The music of "Der kleine Prinz-Das Musical" was written by American soprano Deborah Sasson, the libretto and the lyrics are by Jochen Sautter, who also directed and choreographed the show. www.derkleineprinz.eu The role of the prince was created by the young tenor Moritz Bierbaum, the role of the pilot by French Canadian bass baritone Benoit Pitre. The show toured Germany, Austria, Switzerland and Italy and received raving reviews.
- 2016: A musical version of The Little Prince was produced by Theatre Calgary in Calgary, Alberta, Canada in association with Lamplighter Drama (London, UK), as adapted by Nicholas Lloyd Webber (son of Andrew Lloyd Webber) and James D. Reid, with Sarah Caraher at the Prince, Adam Brazier as the Pilot, and Louise Pitre as the Snake. This production has received the full endorsement of the Saint-Exupéry Estate.
- 2022: A stage musical for The Little Prince,, with a libretto by Chris Mouron and original music by Terry Tuck ran on Broadway at the Broadway Theatre from March 30 to May 8, 2022 as part of an international tour that included runs in Paris, Sydney, and Dubai. It was directed and choreographed by Anne Tournié, with Mouron as co-director.

== Live theatre dramas ==
- 1950: The first German theatrical adaptation of Der Kleine Prinz is created by puppeteer Rudolf Fischer.
- 1971: An Italian theatrical adaptation is produced by Remo Rostagno and Bruna Pilgrims as Il piccolo principe di Saint-Exupéry, letto, interpretato e riscritto da un gruppo di bambini di undici anni (The Little Prince by Saint-Exupéry, read, interpreted and rewritten by a group of children of eleven years of age).
- 1987: Adapted to live theatre in English by David Zucker, produced by Esquire Jauchem and Peter Ellenstein as The Little Prince, featuring David Morse and Bridget Hoffman, at the Cast Theatre and Burbage Theatre in Los Angeles, California, United States* Zucker's adaptation was previously produced by Boston Repertory Theatre Multiple times in the 1970s-1980s.
- 1988: It has also been adapted to "The night I wanted to go to the sky" by Kuo Pao Kun in Singapore.
- 1994: Adapted to live theatre in Italian as Il piccolo principe, featuring Maria Antonietta and Giuseppina Canapa, at the Aperto Theater in Osimo, Ancona, Italy
- 2000: A play adaptation of The Little Prince was written by Rick Cummins and John Scoullar.
- 2002: The French-language musical, Le Petit Prince, by composer Riccardo Cocciante, ran at the Casino de Paris from October 2002 to January 2003. Daniel Lavoie played The Pilot while Jeff Tetedoie played The Prince. It was reprised at the Shanghai Oriental Art Centre in July 2007, and in the Hong Kong Cultural Centre in January 2008 with lyrics by Elizabeth Anais.
- 2002: Adapted to a live theatre play by Anja Pirling, herself playing the central part of "The little prince". Opening night in the Circus Krone Munich, then touring for 6 years in more than 140 cities (concert halls and theatres with up to 2000 seats) in Germany.
- 2005: Peter Joucla adapted and directed a version for Tour de Force Theatre which toured Germany between October and December 2005, produced by American Drama Group Europe.
- 2008: The Little Prince was staged as a solo play by Indian actress Rashi Bunny directed by Arvind Gaur and adapted to Hindi by Capt. Rigved (2008–09)

2008: The Hampstead Theatre in London, England produced a theatre adaptation of The Little Prince, which ran from December 2008 to January 2009.
2008: A French theater adaptation with interactive video is produced by the group Theatre Trois Hangars, staged by Jean-Louis Kamoun with Nils Kasch (as The Prince ), Julien Asselin (The Aviator), Nans Combes (all other characters) and Olivier Durand (video).

- 2011: The Portuguese drama company Byfurcação produces a theatrical adaptation under the title O Principezinho na Quinta da Regaleira.

2011: The Oxford University Dramatic Society scheduled a tour of a new translation and adaptation of the book to the Edinburgh Fringe Festival in August 2011.
2011: Serbian director Srdjan Simic produces a Russian language adaptation in Moscow, Маленького принца, based on The Little Prince, in which the story is set in Kosovo.

- 2012: The Dragonfly Theatre Co. put on an original adaptation in Ho Chi Minh City, Vietnam, in November 2012.
- 2015: Bossy Flyer created an acrobatic theatre adaptation called Flight. Adapted and directed by Ezra LeBank, Flight premiered at the 2015 Edinburgh Festival Fringe, and was performed Off-Broadway at the Barrow Street Theatre in New York City in September 2016.
- 2016: Christine Lesiak created a radical, site-specific adaptation titled The Object of Constellations, in which the character of the pilot is recast as a female astronomer. It premiered April 2016 in Edmonton, Alberta, Canada, at the astronomical observatory of the University of Alberta.
- 2017: Théâtre du Rêve staged a new French-language adaptation by Carolyn Cook in Atlanta, Georgia.

== Music and cultural references ==
- 1974: Rock band Genesis's initial concept for their 1974 album (that became The Lamb Lies Down on Broadway) was initially The Little Prince.
- In 1975, Yehonatan Geffen wrote a song called The Little Prince, telling about a soldier who served alongside him and was killed during a combat exercise. The song contains numerous allusions to the book.
- 1979: The Russian rock band Mashina Vremeni played a concert program in 1979–80, called The Little Prince and included intersong quotations from the book. The whole concept of the program (the live version was released in 2000) was based on the story and the philosophy of the book.
- 1994: Le Petit Prince à La Geode, a multimedia show with music by Giuseppe Verdi and Claude Debussy, was produced by Gianni Ravens and Pierre Goismier at the Géode Music Hall in Paris, France
- 1997: An orchestral suite is conducted by Nicholas Schapfl, in Shanghai, China
- 1999: Jana Kirschner, a lead slovak singer has a song "Fox", named after a character from the book. The lyrics of the song deal with the relationship between The Little Prince and The Fox.
- 2002: The cover art of the Japanese band P-MODEL's album Perspective was inspired by the book; the album also includes the song A Large Snake (うわばみ, Uwabami), whose lyrics (written by P-MODEL member Susumu Hirasawa), also reference the book.

2002: The U.S. screamo band The Saddest Landscape takes their name from the closing passage of The Little Prince, and one of their songs, "Forty Four Sunsets", refers to one of the book's episodes.

- 2006: French singer Mylène Farmer has recorded a song, "Dessine-moi un Mouton" ("Draw me a sheep"), which alludes to The Little Prince.

2006: Singer–pianist Regina Spektor has a song entitled "Baobabs", which refers to The Little Prince and the effect it has on its readers. The song entitled "Baobabs" was included in their special edition vinyl album, Begin to Hope, released in June 2006.

- 2008: The Taiwanese female group band S.H.E released a song entitled "Planet 612", which pays tribute to The Little Prince.
- 2010: JimmyThumP/OneRoomSong composed a Vocaloid song entitled "Little Traveler", that is based on the story.
- 2012: sasakure.UK composed a song entitled "to asteroid B-612", that is based on the story.
- 2015: Prog band Riverside drew inspiration from The Little Prince when writing opening track Lost (Why Should I Be Frightened By a Hat?) on their album Love, Fear and the Time Machine.
- 2016: The South Korean singer Kim Ryeowook of idol group Super Junior released his first solo minialbum entitled "The Little Prince" which features the lead single of the same name.
- 2019: South Korean alt-rock band Onewe released "Regulus", which is written from the perspective of The Little Prince's title character.

== Other cultural references ==
- 1970s: Actor James Dean's fondness for the work extended to his memorizing most of its passages. The nickname of his 1955 Porsche 550 Spyder, "The Little Bastard", is a play on words of his favorite book. A stylized sculpture in memorial to Dean was built in Cholame, California during the late 1970s. It carries a plaque quoting the Little Prince that reads: "What is essential is invisible to the eye", a phrase which Dean reportedly quoted often.
- Little Prince (sculpture), Portland, Oregon.
- Museum of The Little Prince in Hakone, Japan
- 2024: The Little Prince was present in an animation that was part of the opening ceremony of the 2024 Paris Olympics. It shows the Little Prince on an asteroid with a fox and a rose.

== Games ==
- 2003: The boardgame, Der Kleine Prinz, designed by Kai Haferkamp and published by Kosmos, is a semi-cooperative game, somewhat like Cranium, wherein the players try to help the little prince "tame the fox" by performing activities and guessing games.
- 2011: The video games Kingdom Hearts and Super Mario Galaxy have many similarities to the descriptions and pictures from the original book.
- 2013: Another tabletop game, The Little Prince: Make Me A Planet, designed by Antoine Bauza (author of famous board game 7 Wonders) and Bruno Cathala, is a competitive game whose players collect sets of themed pieces to build their own planet and then score it according to the numbers of sheep, roses, lamp posts, etc. their characters managed to collect.
- 2014: OneShot contains several references to the book and its characters, especially inside the Solstice expansion.
- 2015: The Little Prince 2: Kingdom's Rights is a free computer flash game based on the story.
- 2021: Sky: Children of the Light, developed by thatgamecompany, held a seasonal event based on the story in honor of the original book's 75th anniversary.
- 2023: The character Demian in Limbus Company primarily takes inspiration from the eponymous character in Demian, but also references The Little Prince in both character design and quotes.
- 2026: Infinity Nikki's seasonal event For The Child You Once Were is based on the story.
