= In Dreams (Joseph McManners album) =

Studio album by Joseph McManners
- Released: 5 December 2005
- Recorded: 2005
- Genre: Classical
- Length: 45:46
- Label: Sony BMG
- Producer: Nick Patrick

Professional ratings
Review scores
Source	Rating
Newsround	link
The Korea Times	(favourable) link
Sound Generator	(7/10) link
MusicWeb	(favourable) link

In Dreams is the debut album by Joseph McManners and it was released on 5 December 2005 by Sony BMG following a £2 million 4-album record deal. The album features covers of mostly solo renditions of classical songs but it also features a duet with Jo Appleby.

== Background ==
The album, produced by Nick Patrick, is a collection of songs McManners particularly likes or ones that have special meaning to him. For example, the songs "Bright Eyes" and "Walking in the Air" were included because of their sentimental value. They remind him of how he used to watch Watership Down and how he used to watch The Snowman each Christmas Day with his mother. "Where is Love" and "The Little Prince Song" are important because they were key elements to the start of his career.

About the name of the album McManners said:

I called the album In Dreams as I felt it really sums up what the album is all about. All the songs are very reflective and thought provoking. Also the title refers to my own dreams of always wanting to be a singer.

The album was recorded in Prague in the Czech Republic and the music was provided by the Prague Philharmonic Orchestra.

== Critical recognition ==
The album received a nomination for "Album of the Year" at the 2006 Classical Brit Awards and McManners' rendition of "Bright Eyes" from the album has debuted at "number one" in Asian airplay, ahead of James Blunt and Prince.

== Track listing ==
#	Title	Originally from	Songwriter(s)	Music by	Notes
1	"Bright Eyes"	Watership Down		Mike Batt	
2	"Pie Jesu"		John Rutter	John Rutter	
3	"In Dreams"	The Lord of the Rings: The Fellowship of the Ring		Howard Shore	
4	"Psalm 23"	The Vicar of Dibley		Howard Goodall	
5	"Walking in the Air"	The Snowman		Howard Blake	
6	"Panis angelicus"		César Franck	César Franck	
7	"Circle of Life"	The Lion King		Elton John	Duet with Jo Appleby
8	"Lullaby"		Johannes Brahms	Johannes Brahms	
9	"Music of the Angels"	Sonata Pathétique		Beethoven/Saggese	
10	"Candlelight Carol"		John Rutter	John Rutter	
11	"Morning Has Broken"			Cat Stevens	
12	"Where is Love?"	Oliver!		Lionel Bart	
13	"The Little Prince Song"	The Little Prince		Rachel Portman	

Information was retrieved from McManners' official website.
