= Sean Lavery =

Sean Lavery may refer to:

- Sean Lavery (priest)
- Sean Lavery (dancer)
