= List of Robert Plant concert tours =

Led Zeppelin singer Robert Plant has performed solo tours since 1981.

== 1980s ==
- Principle of Moments Tour - June 22, 1983 to February 26, 1984.

The Shaken 'N' Stirred Tour was a concert tour by Robert Plant, the former lead singer of the British rock group Led Zeppelin, in North America and the United Kingdom in 1985. The tour started on June 9, 1985, in Vancouver, British Columbia, and ended on August 10, 1985, in London.

Date	City	Country	Venue
North America
June 9, 1985	Vancouver	Canada	Pacific Coliseum
June 10, 1985	Vancouver	Canada	Pacific Coliseum
June 11, 1985	Tacoma, Washington	United States	Tacoma Dome
June 14, 1985	Daly City, California	United States	Cow Palace
June 15, 1985	Daly City, California	United States	Cow Palace
June 17, 1985	Inglewood, California	United States	The Forum
June 18, 1985	Costa Mesa, California	United States	Pacific Amphitheatre
June 19, 1985	Phoenix, Arizona	United States	Arizona Veterans Memorial Coliseum
June 22, 1985	Houston	United States	The Summit
June 23, 1985	Austin, Texas	United States	Frank Erwin Center
June 24, 1985	Dallas	United States	Reunion Arena
June 26, 1985	Memphis, Tennessee	United States	Mid-South Coliseum
June 27, 1985	Atlanta	United States	Omni Coliseum
June 29, 1985	Tampa, Florida	United States	Expo Hall
June 30, 1985	Pembroke Pines, Florida	United States	Hollywood Sportatorium
July 5, 1985	Indianapolis	United States	Market Square Arena
July 6, 1985	Cincinnati	United States	Riverfront Coliseum
July 8, 1985	Saint Paul, Minnesota	United States	St. Paul Civic Center
July 10, 1985	Rosemont, Illinois	United States	Rosemont Horizon
July 12, 1985	Detroit	United States	Joe Louis Arena
July 13, 1985	Philadelphia	United States	JFK Stadium (Live Aid)
July 15, 1985	Richfield, Ohio	United States	Richfield Coliseum
July 17, 1985	Toronto	Canada	Canadian National Exhibition
July 19, 1985	Buffalo, New York	United States	War Memorial Auditorium
July 20, 1985	Pittsburgh	United States	Civic Arena
July 22, 1985	Saratoga, New York	United States	Saratoga Performing Arts Center
July 23, 1985	East Rutherford, New Jersey	United States	Meadowlands Arena
July 25, 1985	Worcester, Massachusetts	United States	The Centrum
July 26, 1985	Worcester, Massachusetts	United States	The Centrum
July 27, 1985	New Haven, Connecticut	United States	New Haven Coliseum
July 29, 1985	Hampton, Virginia	United States	Hampton Coliseum
July 30, 1985	Landover, Maryland	United States	Capital Centre
August 1, 1985	Philadelphia, Pennsylvania	United States	The Spectrum
August 2, 1985	Philadelphia, Pennsylvania	United States	The Spectrum
August 5, 1985	New York City, New York	United States	Madison Square Garden
Europe
August 8, 1985	Birmingham	England	National Exhibition Centre
August 10, 1985	London	England	Wembley Arena

== 1990s ==
- Manic Nirvana Tour - May 1, 1990 to January 10, 1991.
- Fate of Nations Tour - May 1, 1993 to January 28, 1994.
- Priory of Brion Tour - July 23, 1999 to December 20, 2000.

== 2000s ==
- Dreamland Tour - May 22, 2002 to August 23, 2003.
- Mighty ReArranger Tour - 2005.

== 2010s ==
=== 2013 ===
The 2013 tours were billed as "Sensational Space Shifters – Robert Plant, the voice of Led Zeppelin".

Date	City	Country	Venue
Spring 2013 Singapore Show
21 April 2013	Singapore	Singapore	Timbre Rock & Roots Festival
Spring 2013 Australia & New Zealand Tour
23 April 2013	Perth	Australia	West Coast Blues & Roots Festival
26 April 2013	Adelaide	Australia	Entertainment Centre
28 April 2013	Sydney	Australia	Entertainment Centre
30 April 2013	Byron Bay	Australia	Bluesfest
31 April 2013	Hunter Valley	Australia	Newcastle Entertainment Centre
3 April 2013	Melbourne	Australia	Rod Laver Arena
5 April 2013	Launceston	Australia	Silverdome
9 April 2013	Wellington	New Zealand	TSB Bank Arena
11 April 2013	Auckland	New Zealand	Vector Arena
Summer 2013 US Tour
20 June 2013	Dallas	United States	Palladium
21 June 2013	Houston	United States	Bayou Music Center
23 June 2013 (Note: The show on 23 June 2013 was a part of Austin City Limits.)	Austin	United States	Moody Theater
26 June 2013	Los Angeles	United States	Shrine Auditorium
28 June 2013	Santa Barbara	United States	County Bowl
29 June 2013	Berkeley	United States	Berkeley Greek
2 July 2013	Jacksonville	United States	Britt Festival
4 July 2013	Quincy	United States	High Sierra Festival
6 July 2013	Woodinville	United States	Chateau Ste. Michelle Winery Amphitheatre
7 July 2013	Portland	United States	Portland Blues Festival
10 July 2013	Morrison	United States	Red Rocks Amphitheatre
12 July 2013	Chicago	United States	Petrillo Music Shell (Taste of Chicago)
13 July 2013	Memphis	United States	Live in the Garden
14 July 2013	Louisville	United States	Forecastle Festival
17 July 2013	New Orleans	United States	Mahalia Jackson Theater
19 July 2013	Alpharetta	United States	Verizon Wireless Amphitheatre
20 July 2013	Cary	United States	Koka Booth Amphitheatre
22 July 2013	Vienna	United States	Wolftrap
24 July 2013	Uncasville	United States	Mohegan Sun Arena
25 July 2013	Boston	United States	Bank of America Pavilion
27 July 2013	Brooklyn	United States	Prospect Park
Summer 2013 UK & Ireland Tour
29 August 2013	Bristol	England	Colston Hall
31 August 2013	Stradbally	Ireland	Electric Picnic Festival 2013
2 September 2013	Wolverhampton	England	Wolverhampton Civic Hall
Autumn 2013 UK Shows
29 October 2013	Manchester	England	O_{2} Apollo Manchester
31 October 2013 (Note: The show on 31 October was a part of Bluesfest 2013.)	London	England	Royal Albert Hall

=== 2014 ===
The 2014 tours were billed as "Sensational Space Shifters – Robert Plant, the voice of Led Zeppelin".

Date	City	Country	Venue
Spring-Summer 2014 Europe (& North Africa) Tour
26 April 2014	New Orleans	United States	New Orleans Jazz Heritage Festival
5 June 2014	Rabat	Morocco	Mawazine Festival
8 June 2014	Landgraaf	Netherlands	Pinkpop Festival
10 June 2014	Gothenburg	Sweden	Lisebergshallen
12 June 2014	Bergen	Norway	Bergen Fest
14 June 2014	Rättvik	Sweden	Dalhalla
16 June 2014	Tallinn	Estonia	Saku Arena
19 June 2014	Odense	Denmark	The Funen Village
20 June 2014	Hamburg	Germany	Stadtpark
22 June 2014	Paris	France	Le Bataclan
23 June 2014	Cologne	Germany	E-WERK
25 June 2014	Cork	Ireland	The Marquee
28 June 2014	Pilton	England	Glastonbury Festival (Note: Plant's live performance on 28 June 2014 at the Glastonbury Festival was scheduled at 17:30-18:45.)
Summer 2014 Europe Festivals Tour
1 July 2014	Vienne	France	Vienne Jazz Festival
3 July 2014	Werchter	Belgium	Rock Werchter
5 July 2014	Cognac	France	Cognac Blues Passions
6 July 2014	Belfort	France	Eurockeennes Festival
8 July 2014	Montreux	Switzerland	Montreux Jazz Festival
9 July 2014	Zürich	Switzerland	Live at Sunset
11 July 2014	Pistoia	Italy	Pistoia Blues Festival
12 July 2014	Rome	Italy	Cavea
14 July 2014	Piazzola sul Brenta	Italy	Anfiteatro Camerini
16 July 2014	Berlin	Germany	Zitadelle
17 July 2014	Dresden	Germany	Garten Junge Garde
19 July 2014	Ostrava	Czech Republic	Colours of Ostrava
Summer 2014 Spain Tour – cancelled due to "scheduling conflicts"
~~24 July 2014~~	~~Bilbao~~	Spain	~~Guggenheim Museum~~
~~26 July 2014~~	~~Cartagena~~	Spain	~~Festival La Mar de Músicas~~
~~27 July 2014~~	~~Málaga~~	Spain	~~Plaza de Toros~~
~~29 July 2014~~	~~Madrid~~	Spain	~~Palacio Vistalegre~~
~~31 July 2014~~	~~Tarragona~~	Spain	~~Cap Roig festival~~
Summer 2014 Europe Festivals Tour (final date)
9 August 2014	Glastonbury	England	Glastonbury Extravaganza
Summer 2014 Japan Festivals Shows
16 August 2014	Tokyo	Japan	Summer Sonic Festival
17 August 2014	Osaka	Japan	Summer Sonic Festival
Summer 2014 London Show
8 September 2014	London	England	Roundhouse
Autumn 2014 North-America Tour
25 September 2014	Port Chester	United States	Capitol Theater
27 September 2014	New York City	United States	Brooklyn Academy of Music
28 September 2014	New York City	United States	Brooklyn Academy of Music
30 September 2014	Toronto	Canada	Massey Hall
2 October 2014	Chicago	United States	Riviera Theatre
4 October 2014	Denver	United States	The Fillmore Auditorium
7 October 2014	Los Angeles	United States	Hollywood Palladium
Autumn 2014 United Kingdom & Ireland Tour
9 November 2014	Newport	England	Newport Centre
10 November 2014	Bournemouth	England	O2 Academy
12 November 2014	London	England	London Roundhouse
14 November 2014	Hull	England	Hull City Hall
15 November 2014	Glasgow	Scotland	O2 Academy
17 November 2014	Leeds	England	O2 Academy
18 November 2014	Newcastle	England	O2 Academy
20 November 2014	Cambridge	England	Corn Exchange
21 November 2014	Wolverhampton	England	Civic Hall
23 November 2014	Belfast	Northern Ireland	Ulster Hall
24 November 2014	Dublin	Ireland	Olympia
26 November 2014	Blackpool	England	Blackpool Tower
27 November 2014	Llandudno	Wales	Cymru Arena

=== 2015 ===
Date	City	Country	Venue
Winter-Spring 2015 South-America Tour
13 March 2015	Mexico City	Mexico	Vive Latino - Foro Sol
15 March 2015	Santiago	Chile	Lollapalooza Chile - Parque O'Higgins
16 March 2015	Santiago	Chile	Caupolican
19 March 2015	Asunción	Paraguay	Asunciónico Festival – Jockey Club Asunción
21 March 2015	Buenos Aires	Argentina	Lollapalooza Argentina - Hipódromo de San Isidro
24 March 2015	Buenos Aires	Argentina	Citibank Hall
26 March 2015	Belo Horizonte	Brazil	Chevrolet Hall
28 March 2015	São Paulo	Brazil	Lollapalooza Brazil - Autódromo de Interlagos
Spring 2015 US Tour
25 April 2015	Washington, D.C.	United States	Kennedy Center
24 May 2015	Quincy	United States	Sasquatch! Festival
25 May 2015	Bend	United States	Les Schwab Amphitheater
27 May 2015	Salt Lake City	United States	The Depot
28 May 2015	Las Vegas	United States	Brooklyn Bowl
30 May 2015	Napa	United States	BottleRock Napa Valley Festival
31 May 2015	Santa Barbara	United States	Santa Barbara Bowl
2 June 2015	Los Angeles	United States	Greek Theatre
12 June 2015	Memphis	United States	Mud Island Amphitheatre
14 June 2015	Manchester	United States	Bonnaroo Music Festival
15 June 2015	Cary	United States	Koka Booth Amphitheatre
17 June 2015	Philadelphia	United States	Mann Center
Summer 2015 Europe Tour
10 July 2015	Gloucestershire	United Kingdom	Forest Live
11 July 2015	Staffordshire	United Kingdom	Forest Live
14 July 2015	Stockholm	Sweden	Gröna Lund Tivoli
16 July 2015	Molde	Norway	Moldejazz Festival
18 July 2015	Pori	Finland	Pori Jazz Festival
19 July 2015	Salacgriva	Latvia	Positivus Festival
21 July 2015	Słupsk	Poland	The Rock Legends Festival — Charlotta Valley Amphitheatre
23 July 2015	Brno	Czech Republic	Hala Rondo
25 July 2015	Nyon	Switzerland	Paleo Festival
27 July 2015	Lyon	France	Les Nuits de Fourvière festival — Théâtres Romains de Fourvière
29 July 2015	Frankfurt	Germany	Jahrhunderthalle
31 July 2015	Notodden	Norway	Notodden Blues Festival
8 August 2015	Landerneau	France	Fête du Bruit Festival
9 August 2015	Lokeren	Belgium	Lokerse Feesten
11 August 2015	Munich	Germany	Zenith
12 August 2015	Colmar	France	Foire aux Vins d'Alsace Festival
Summer 2015 North-America Tour
10 September 2015	Rochester Hills	United States	Meadowbrook Music Festival
11 September 2015	Arrington	United States	Lockn Festival
15 September 2015	Toronto	Canada	Molson Canadian Amphitheatre
17 September 2015	Port Chester	United States	The Capitol Theatre
18 September 2015	New York City	United States	Hammerstein Ballroom
20 September 2015	Boston	United States	Leader Bank Pavilion
22 September 2015	Indianapolis	United States	Murat Theatre
23 September 2015	Chicago	United States	FirstMerit Bank Pavilion

=== 2016 ===
Date	City	Country	Venue
Spring 2016 North America Tour
4 March 2016	Ockeechobee	United States	Okeechobee Music & Arts Festival
6 March 2016	St. Augustine	United States	St. Augustine Amphitheatre
7 March 2016	Mobile	United States	Saegner Theatre
9 March 2016	Jackson	United States	Thalia Mara Hall
10 March 2016	Baton Rouge	United States	River Center Theatre
11 March 2016	Shreveport	United States	Shreveport Municipal Auditorium
13 March 2016	Tulsa	United States	Cain's Ballroom
15 March 2016	Dallas	United States	The Bomb Factory
17 March 2016	San Antonio	United States	Tobin Center for the Performing Arts
18 March 2016	Midland	United States	Wagner Noël Performing Arts Center
20 March 2016	Austin	United States	ACL Live at Moody Theater
21 March 2016	Austin	United States	ACL Live at Moody Theater
Summer 2016 Europe Tour
1 July 2016	Werchter	Belgium	Rock Werchter
2 July 2016	Hérouville-Saint-Clair	France	Festival Beauregard
4 July 2016	Istres	France	Les Nuits Festival
7 July 2016	Lisbon	Portugal	NOS Alive
9 July 2016	Barcelona	Spain	Cruïlla
10 July 2016	Bilbao	Spain	Bilbao Arena
12 July 2016	Gijón	Spain	Palacio de Deportes
14 July 2016	Madrid	Spain	Noches del Botanico
16 July 2016	Marbella	Spain	Starlite Festival
~~18 July 2016~~	~~Nice~~	~~France~~	~~Jazz Festival~~ – CANCELLED
20 July 2016	Milan	Italy	Street Music Art (Assago Summer Arena)
22 July 2016	Naples	Italy	Arena Flegrea
24 July 2016	Taormina	Italy	Teatro Antico di Taormina
27 July 2016	Plzeň	Czech Republic	Amfiteátr Lochotín
28 July 2016	Vienna	Austria	Arena Wien
30 July 2016	Pula	Croatia	Arena
2 August 2016	Meersburg	Germany	Meersburg Schlossplatz
3 August 2016	Avenches	Switzerland	Rock Oz'Arènes
5 August 2016 (Note: The show on 5 August 2016 was a part of the Wilderness Festival.)	Chalbury	England	Cornbury Park
Autumn 2016 Lampedusa Concerts for Refugees tour (with Emmylou Harris, Steve Earle, Patty Griffin, Buddy Miller, The Milk Carton Kids...)
11 October 2016	St. Louis	North America	
12 October 2016	Milwaukee	North America	
13 October 2016	Chicago	North America	
14 October 2016	Toronto	North America	
16 October 2016	Boston	North America	
18 October 2016	New York City	North America	
19 October 2016	Philadelphia	North America	
21 October 2016	Washington, D.C.	North America	

=== 2017 ===
Date	City	Venue
Autumn 2017 Britain and Ireland Tour
16 November 2017	Plymouth	Pavilions
17 November 2017	Bristol	Colston Hall
20 November 2017	Wolverhampton	Civic
22 November 2017	Llandudno	Venue Cymru
24 November 2017	Newcastle	City Hall
25 November 2017	Liverpool	Olympia
27 November 2017	Glasgow	SEC Armadillo
28 November 2017	Perth	Concert Hall
30 November 2017	Manchester	O2 Apollo
2 December 2017	Belfast	Ulster Hall
3 December 2017	Dublin	Bord Gáis Energy Theatre
6 December 2017	Sheffield	City Hall
8 December 2017	London	Royal Albert Hall
11 December 2017	Portsmouth	Guildhall
12 December 2017	Birmingham	Symphony Hall

=== 2018 ===
Date	City	Venue
Summer 2018 US Tour in support of Carry Fire
June 8, 2018	Atlanta	Cadence Bank Amphitheatre
June 10, 2018	Richmond, Virginia	Virginia Credit Union Live!
June 12, 2018	Columbia, Maryland	Merriweather Post Pavilion
June 13, 2018	Forest Hills, Queens	Forest Hills Stadium
June 15, 2018	Toronto	Budweiser Stage
June 17, 2018	Chicago	Jay Pritzker Pavilion
June 19, 2018	Vail	Gerald R. Ford Amphitheater
June 21, 2018	Berkeley, California	Hearst Greek Theatre
June 23, 2018	Stateline, Nevada	Lake Tahoe Outdoor Arena
June 24, 2018	Pasadena	Arroyo Seco Music and Arts Festival
June 26, 2018	Troutdale, Oregon	Edgefield
June 27, 2018	Redmond, Washington	Marymoor Park Amphitheatre
June 29, 2018	Vancouver	Vancouver International Jazz Festival

== Sources and external links ==
- Robert Plant Official Website / News
- Robert Plant Official Website / On The Road
- led-zeppelin.org / Post "Robert Plant announces North American tour dates" on Friday, 15 August 2014, 11:49
- ledzepconcerts.com / Robert Plant Concert Dates Past & present versions
