= Maswanganyi =

Maswanganyi is a surname. Notable people with the surname include:

- Elvis "DJ Mujava" Maswanganyi (born c. 1985), South African DJ
- Joe Maswanganyi (born 1966), South African politician
- Patrick Maswanganyi (born 1998), South African soccer player
- Shaun Maswanganyi (born 2001), South African track and field athlete
- Tsakane Valentine Maswanganyi (born 1979), South African classical soprano
