= The Little Prince (play) =

Play adapted by Rick Cummins and John Scoullar

The Little Prince is a play based on the book of the same name by Antoine de Saint-Exupéry, adapted by Rick Cummins and John Scoullar before 2000. Rick Cummins wrote the music, and John Scoullar wrote the script and lyrics. There are several changes from the book, including the omission of the drunkard (tippler), switchman and merchant characters; the removal of a great deal of the narration from the aviator; significant changes to the rose scenes; and a large change in the order of events.

== Musical numbers ==
This version of The Little Prince for theater is not only a play but a musical, also, with many lengthy musical numbers. Two songs to note are the song of the Fox, "Day after Day", and the Aviator's first song, "I Fly". The longest song in the script has to be the Rose and Prince number, which goes by the title of "What a Beautiful day".

Although the play has an entire orchestra performing, it does not necessarily require one in the background for the full effect. A nicely-tuned piano and a strong chorus will have the same effect as a full orchestra.

== See also ==
- List of The Little Prince adaptations, a listing of The Little Prince story adapted into various media.
- The Little Prince (1974 film), a 1974 musical film directed by Stanley Donen
- The Little Prince (2015 film), a 2015 animated fantasy film directed by Mark Osborne
- The Little Prince (opera), an opera in two acts by Rachel Portman to an English libretto by Nicholas Wright
- The Adventures of The Little Prince (TV series), an anime series
- The Little Prince and the Aviator, a 1981 musical theatre adaptation
- Antoine de Saint-Exupéry category listing of articles
