= David Habbin =

David Habbin is a tenor from Ringwood, Hampshire, England, who achieved international acclaim as a founding member of the pop opera band, Amici Forever.

== Biography ==
Habbin spent several years performing and writing with rock and pop bands, including The Flaming Softies, Wildlife and Prima Shock before he began vocal training with international operatic tenor Jon Andrew and secured funding to study acting and music theatre at Mountview Theatre School in North London.

After completing his studies there, he performed in the roles of Marius and Combeferre in Les Misérables at the Palace Theatre; had a role in a British feature movie, Julie and the Cadillacs; and starred in the role of Tony in West Side Story, directed by the librettist, playwright and co-creator of West Side Story Arthur Laurents, in London in the original West End revival and in the subsequent tour throughout the United Kingdom for over 600 performances.

Habbin then went on to consolidate his operatic training for two years at the Royal Northern College of Music in Manchester, and has since performed with various UK opera companies in several roles, including Alfredo in La Traviata, Lt. Pinkerton in Madame Butterfly, Ernesto in Don Pasquale, Almaviva in The Barber of Seville, Alfred in Die Fledermaus and Fenton in Falstaff.

Habbin also worked with Glyndebourne Festival Opera for their Summer Festival and their touring company, before joining Amici Forever.

Habbin starred in the 2008 performances of White Christmas for Raymond Gubbay with Jacinta Whyte at Royal Albert Hall. Most recently he appeared in Carrie at the Southwark Playhouse and in Brigadoon with John Wilson at the RTE Concert Hall in Dublin.

== Discography ==
with Amici Forever

- The Opera Band (2004)
- Defined (2005)
