= The Adventures of the Little Prince =

The Adventures of the Little Prince may refer to:

- The Little Prince, French aviator Antoine de Saint Exupéry's most famous novella
- The Adventures of the Little Prince (TV series), anime series based on the book by Antoine de Saint-Exupéry
