= Little Princess =

Little Princess may refer to:

- A Little Princess, a 1905 children's novel by Frances Hodgson Burnett
  - A Little Princess (musical), a 2004 musical adaptation by Andrew Lippa
  - A Little Princess (1917 film), starring Mary Pickford
  - The Little Princess (1939 film), starring Shirley Temple
  - A Little Princess (1973) TV serial), starring Deborah Makepeace
  - A Little Princess (1986 TV serial), starring Amelia Shankley and Maureen Lipman
  - A Little Princess (1995 film), starring Liesel Matthews and Eleanor Bron
  - Sarah... Ang Munting Prinsesa, a 1995 Filipino film adaptation starring Camille Prats, Angelica Panganiban and Jean Garcia
  - A Little Princess (1997 film), starring Anastasia Meskova
  - Shōkōjo Seira, a 2009 Japanese film adaptation
- Little Princess (automobile), a cyclecar built by the Princess Cyclecar Company
- Little Princess (British TV series), a children's animated television series
- Little Princess (album), a 2009 album by Tim Sparks
- "The Little Princess", a religious tract published by Chick Publications
- The Little Princesses, a non-fiction book by Marion Crawford about her time as governess for Princess Elizabeth
- Little Princess (Philippine TV series), a Filipino television drama romance series starring Jo Berry

== Games ==
- Little Princess: Maru Oukoku no Ningyou Hime 2, a 1999 RPG from the Marl Kingdom series

== See also ==
- Princess (disambiguation)
- Little Prince (disambiguation)
