= IWC Schaffhausen =

Swiss luxury watch manufacturer

IWC International Watch Co. AG
- Trade name: IWC Schaffhausen
- Type: Subsidiary
- Industry: Watchmaking
- Founded: 1868; 158 years ago
- Founder: Florentine Ariosto Jones
- Headquarters: Schaffhausen, Switzerland
- Area served: Worldwide
- Products: Watches
- Number of employees: 1,500
- Parent: Richemont
- Website: www.iwc.com

IWC International Watch Co. AG is a Swiss luxury watch manufacturer located in Schaffhausen, Switzerland. Originally founded in 1868, the company was transferred to the Rauschenbach family in 1880 after bankruptcy and has been a subsidiary of the Swiss Richemont Group since 2000.

== History ==
American watchmaker Florentine Ariosto Jones, who was previously a director of E. Howard & Co., founded the company in 1868.

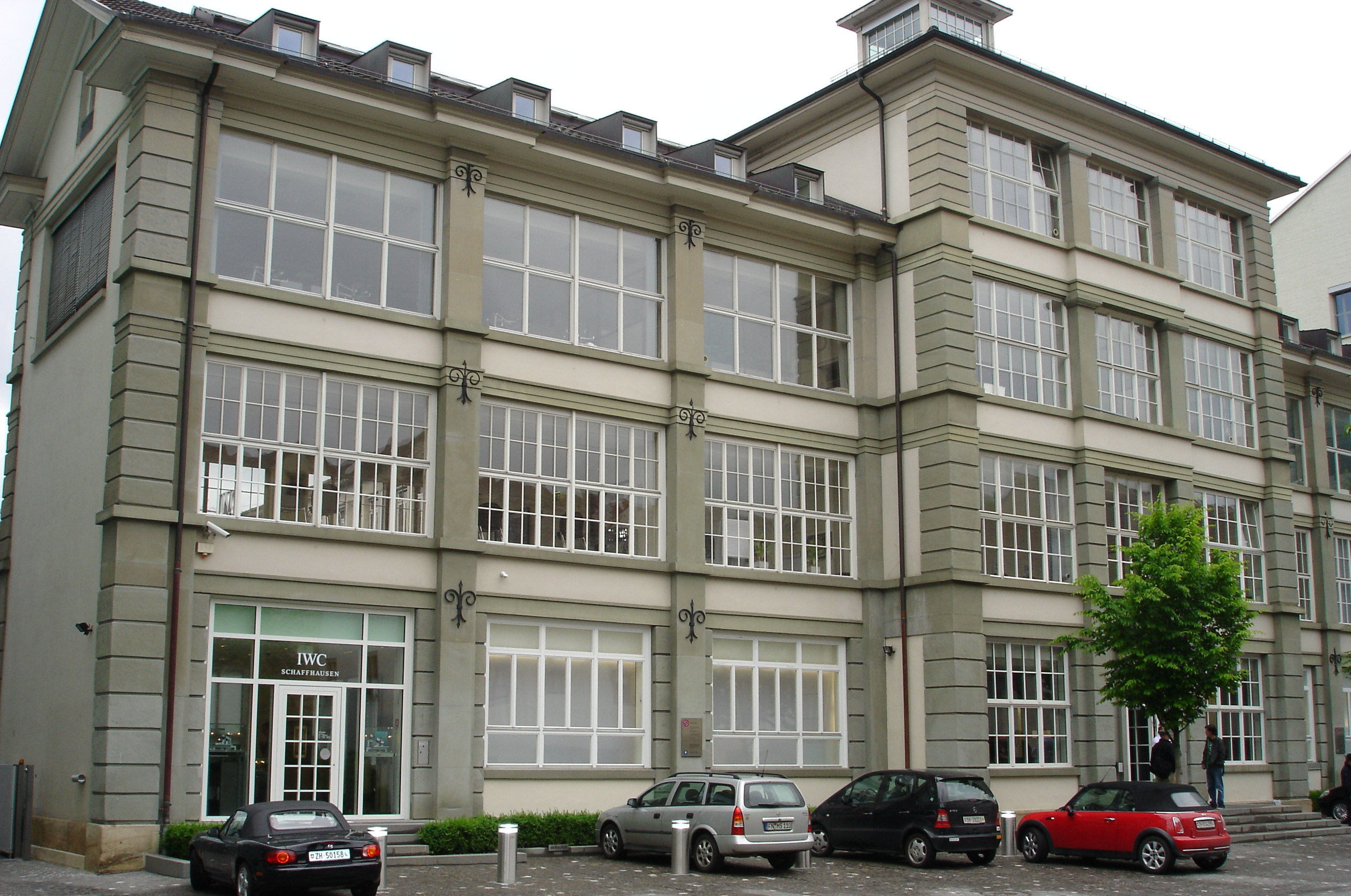
IWC factory in Schaffhausen

From the second half of the thirties to the end of World War II, IWC was one of five watch manufacturers that built B-Uhren (lit. 'observer watches') for the Luftwaffe, air force of the Nazi Germany. The company was also one of twelve manufacturers (known to collectors as the 'Dirty Dozen') which provided watches to the British War Office, under the W.W.W. specification, resulting in the Mark X.

On 1 April 1944, Schaffhausen was bombed by the United States Army Air Forces.

After World War II, IWC was forced to change its focus. All of Eastern Europe had fallen under the Iron Curtain, and the economy of Germany was in shambles. As a result, old contacts and connections with other countries in Europe and the Americas as well as Australia and the Far East were revived and intensified or established.

IWC created Caliber 89 movement. It measured 27.1 mm and featured a center-seconds hand, 17 jewels, overcoil balance spring, and the option of hacking seconds. It beat at a frequency of 2.5 Hz or 18,000 vph.

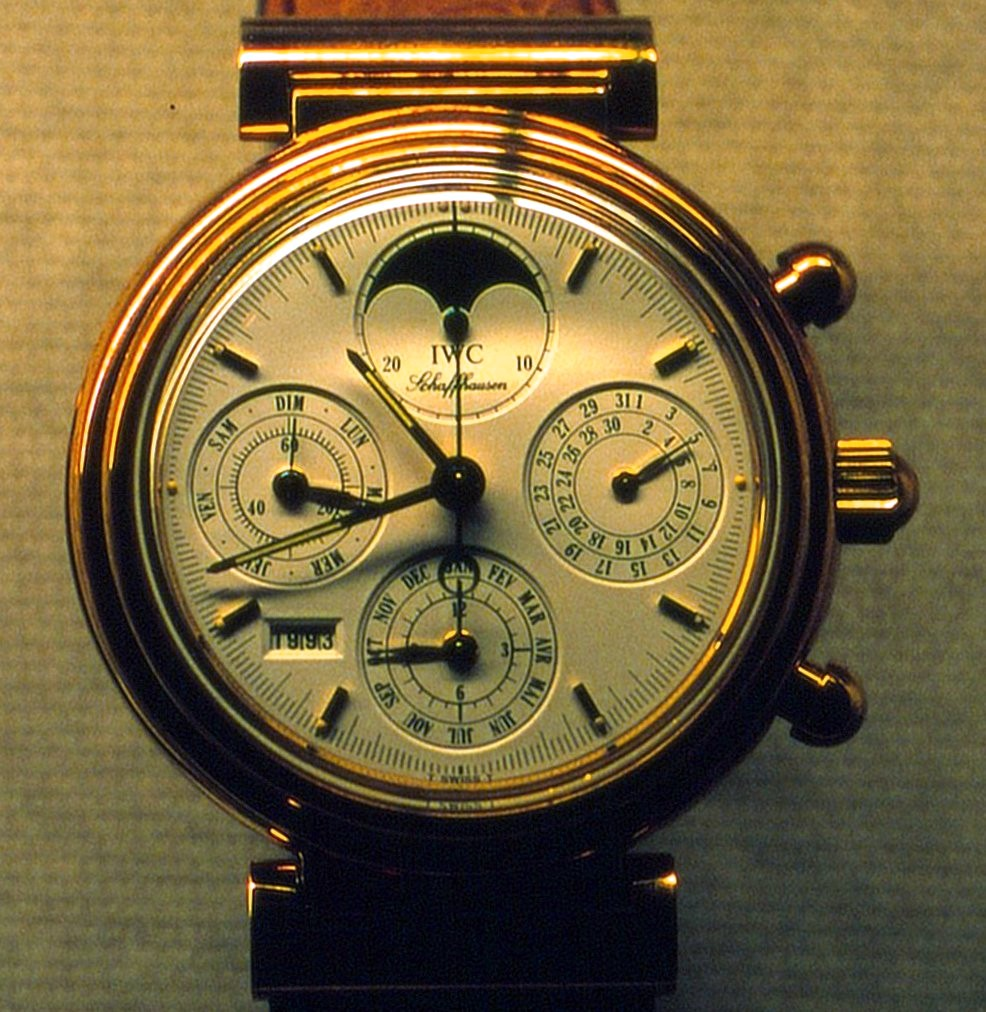
The IWC Da Vinci (Musée International d'Horlogerie, La Chaux-De-Fonds, Switzerland)

IWC developed its titanium bracelets first in 1980 in collaboration with Porsche Design team.

The IWC ref.3750 and 3755 was released in 1986; ref.3770 was released in 1990.

In 1991, IWC director Günter Blümlein founded the LMH Group.

The Portugieser Eternal Calendar, introduced in 2024, was ranked by Aiguille d’Or in 2024 as the overall best watch of the year. It achieved a Guinness World Record for being the most precise lunar phase wristwatch, deviating by one day every 45 million years. The accuracy is achieved through a reduction gear.

== Watch manufacturing ==
=== IWC movements ===
Manufacture in-house movements include the Caliber 50000/52000, Caliber 80000/82000/89000, which feature the Pellaton winding system, using pawls rather than direct gearing between the rotor and barrel, and the pocket watch movements used in the Portuguese F.A. Jones and other IWC pocket watches.

In response to ETA SA's cut in supply of ébauche movements, IWC developed their new manufacture automatic and chronograph movements, Caliber 32000, Caliber 69000 as in-house designed replacements and are widely used in the Pilot, Portuguese and Ingenieur collections. Richemont Group's Montblanc MB 25.10 movement was also based on IWC's 69370.

=== Environmental rating ===
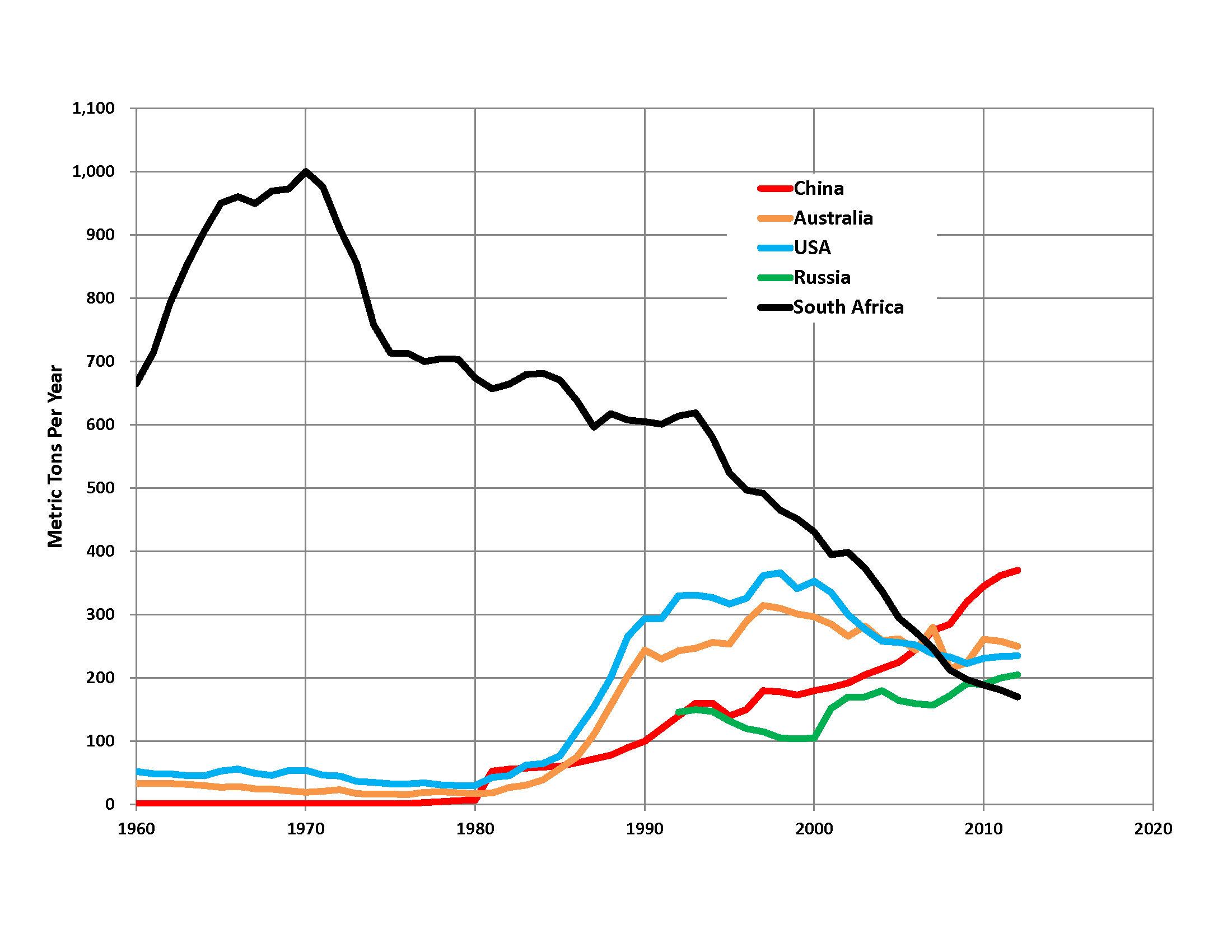
Top 5 gold producing nations

In December 2018, World Wide Fund for Nature (WWF) released an official report giving environmental ratings for 15 major watch manufacturers and jewelers in Switzerland. IWC received a passing rating among 4 other manufacturers. In jewelry and watchmaking industry, there are general concerns over the lack of transparency in manufacturing activities and the sourcing of precious raw materials such as gold, which is a major cause of environmental issues such as pollution, soil degradation and deforestation.

== Charity auctions ==
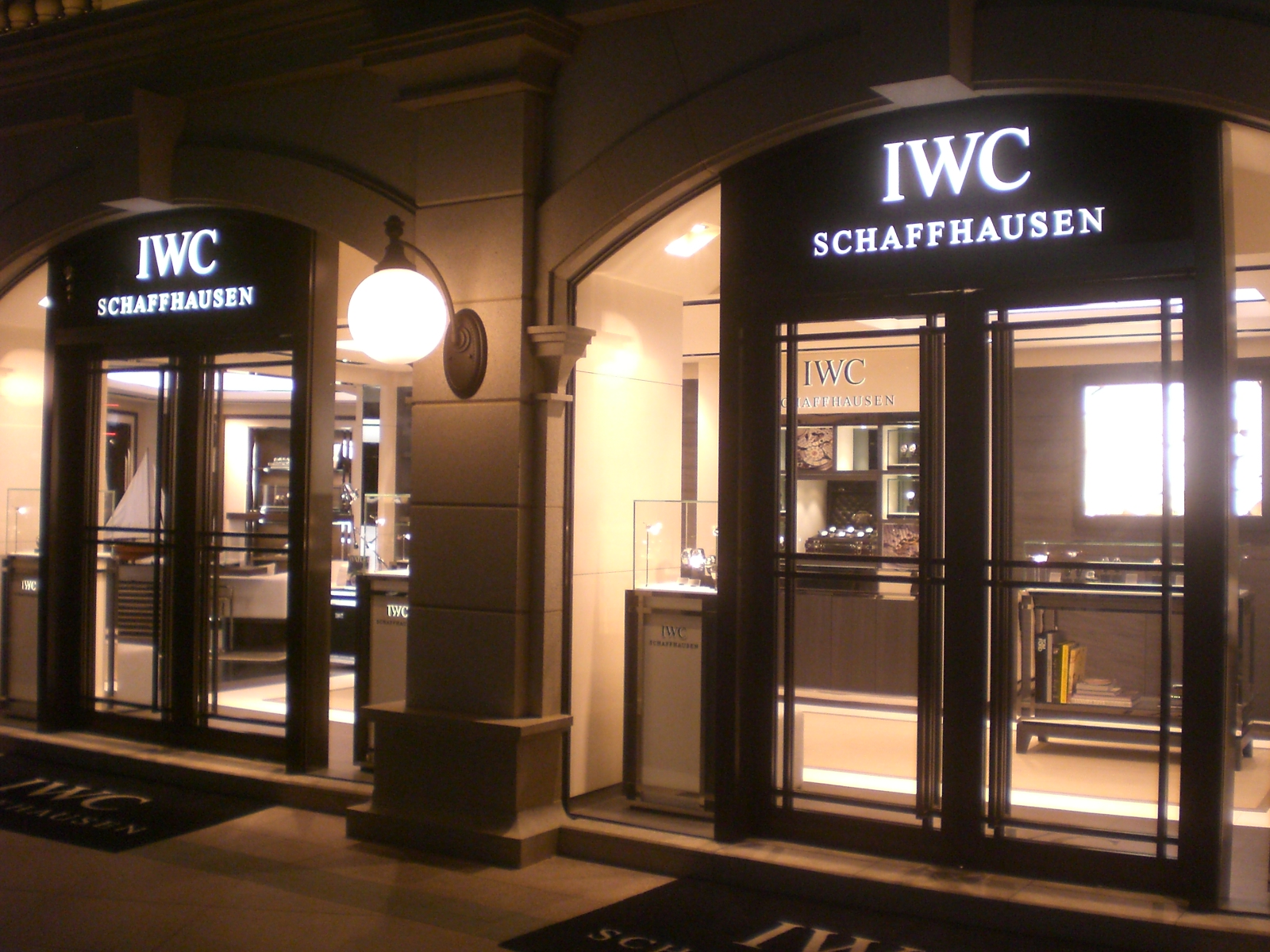
The IWC Flagship Store in Hong Kong

Since 1997, IWC has been offering special edition "Le Petit Prince" and "Antoine de Saint-Exupéry" watches for online auction to support the Antoine de Saint-Exupéry Youth Foundation. The proceeds help disadvantaged young people around the world realize their dreams through educational and cultural projects.

IWC also has long-standing partnerships with the Laureus Sport for Good Foundation since its inception in 2005. Once a year during the Laureus Charity Night in Zurich, one Laureus-themed watch donated by IWC is auctioned with proceeds directly benefiting the foundation's work in using sport to end violence, discrimination, and disadvantage for children and young people.

== See also ==
- List of watch manufacturers
