= The Adventures of the Little Prince (TV series) =

Japanese anime television series (1978–79)

- Poster from the first DVD box of the series depicting the main characters

星の王子さま プチ・プランス (Hoshi no Ōjisama Puchi Puransu)
- Genre: Adventure
- Anime television series
- Directed by: Kōji Yamazaki; Takeyuki Kanda
- Produced by: Hiromichi Mogaki; Hiroshi Hashioka
- Music by: Kunihiro Kawano
- Studio: Knack Productions
- Licensed by: NA: Discotek Media
- Original network: ANN (ABC, TV Asahi)
- English network: CA: TVOntario Knowledge Network; NZ: TV One; US: Nickelodeon; ZA: TV2 Bop TV
- Original run: July 4, 1978 – March 27, 1979
- Episodes: 39 (Note: In Japan, the last 4 episodes were not broadcast on TV and were released directly on home video. Only 26 of the 39 episodes were dubbed into English.)

The Adventures of the Little Prince is an anime series based on the book by Antoine de Saint-Exupéry. Made by the animation studio Knack Productions, the series, originally titled The Prince of the Stars: Le Petit Prince (星の王子さま プチ・プランス, Hoshi no Ōjisama Puchi Puransu), aired in Japan on the TV Asahi network from July 1978 to March 1979. Dubbed into English, the series premiered in the United States in 1982 on ABC, eventually being rerun on Nickelodeon from June 1, 1985, to December 29, 1989. It was also broadcast on TVOntario throughout the 1980s beginning in 1985, a station that would later pick up the dub of the 2010 French adaptation. Yoshikazu Yasuhiko, of Mobile Suit Gundam fame, was involved in this series as a director.

In total, there were 26 episodes aired in English, with 39 episodes made for the original Japanese run. Discotek Media picked up the North American license for the anime in 2017. In May and December of that same year, Discotek Media uploaded a Japanese language (with English subtitles) of the first episode on YouTube, and all 39 episodes of the Japanese language version (with English subtitles) on Crunchyroll.

According to The Anime Encyclopedia by Jonathan Clements and Helen McCarthy, only the first 35 episodes were actually aired on Japanese TV; the remaining four episodes were unreleased until the series was reissued on video.

== Plot ==
The series followed the Little Prince as he travels on a comet from his home planet, B-612, to Earth. He lands in Europe and embarks on a journey across the continent, where he helped local people.

The premise was altered for the English version. It had the Little Prince traveling to Earth and planets that resembled it and returning home at the end of each episode, and helped people at the various places he went to. In addition to the premise, episode plots were also altered. After Discotek Media acquired the anime license in North America, all 39 episodes can now be watched on Crunchyroll in Japanese with English subtitles.

== Episodes ==
No.	Title (Note: Translated episode titles are taken from Crunchyroll.)	English title	Original release date
1	"My Home, a Tiny Planet" "Furusato no chisana hoshi" (ふるさとの小さな星)	"Somewhere in Space"	July 4, 1978
2	"Friendship in the Desert" "Sabaku no yūjō" (砂漠の友情)	"A Small Alien"	July 11, 1978
3	"Earth, the Green Planet" (みどりの星・地球)	N/A	July 18, 1978
4	"Morning Shining with Life" (命かがやく朝)	"Visit to Another Planet"	July 25, 1978
5	"Light of the Heart" (心のともしび)	"A Light in the Storm"	August 1, 1978
6	"Even So, Stars Twinkle" (それでも星はまたたく)	"The Star Gazer"	August 8, 1978
7	"The Castle Floating on the Sea" (海に浮かぶ城)	N/A	August 15, 1978
8	"On the Bank of the Lake" (湖のほとりで)	"The Wolf Pack"	August 22, 1978
9	"Small Promise" (小さな約束)	"The Wishing Stone"	August 29, 1978
10	"Sound of the Flute Across the Lake" (湖をわたる笛の音)	"Play it Again, Sean!"	September 5, 1978
11	"Dandelions and the Girl" (タンポポと少女)	"What Makes Mitzi Mean?"	September 12, 1978
12	"Hero from the Mountain" (山から来た英雄)	"Too Big for This World"	September 26, 1978
13	"Red Roses Tie Together Two Hearts" (心を結ぶ赤いバラ)	"Always Listen to a Fox"	October 3, 1978
14	"The Rose Captain" (バラの船長さん)	"Last Voyage of the Rose"	October 10, 1978
15	"The Rainbow, the Boy and the Bandits" (虹と少年と盗賊と)	"Rob the Rainbow"	October 17, 1978
16	"Sea of Flying Gulls" (カモメとぶ海)	"On Wings of Love"	October 24, 1978
17	"Nature's Friendship" (大自然の友情)	"A Different World"	October 31, 1978
18	"Violets in the Attic" (屋根裏のスミレ)	"The Chimney Sweep"	November 7, 1978
19	"Nostalgic Telescope" (なつかしい遠メガネ)	"The Magic Case"	November 14, 1978
20	"Star in the Palm of My Hand" (手のひらの星)	"Hitch Onto Halley's Comet"	November 21, 1978
21	"The Exhilarating Wooden Horse Race" (爽快！木馬レース)	"The Winning Ride"	November 28, 1978
22	"Father and Son in the Storm" (嵐の中の父と子)	"Shipwreck!"	December 5, 1978
23	"Grandfather Simon's Presents" (シモンじいさんの贈り物)	"The Greatest Gift"	December 19, 1978
24	"The Man Who Digs for a Dream" (夢を掘る男)	"The Perfect Planet"	January 9, 1979
25	"Fly Over the Mountain Range in a Balloon!" (飛べ気球！山脈をこえて)	"Higher Than Eagles Fly"	January 16, 1979
26	"Little Flowers on Mount Rowen" (ローエン山の小さな花)	"Erase All Beauty"	January 23, 1979
27	"Run, Steam Locomotive!" (走れ！機関車)	N/A	January 30, 1979
28	"Lullabye Plant of Love" (愛のララバイ草)	N/A	February 6, 1979
29	"When the Aurora Glows" (オーロラの輝くとき)	"To Be a Man"	February 13, 1979
30	"The Adventure of the SS Dream (Part 1)" (ドリーム号の冒険 ―前編―)	N/A	February 20, 1979
31	"The Adventure of the SS Dream (Part 2)" (ドリーム号の冒険 ―後編―)	N/A	February 27, 1979
32	"I Want to Go Back to My Planet" (星へ帰りたい)	N/A	March 6, 1979
33	"Fly, SS Shooting Star!" (飛べ流星号！)	N/A	March 13, 1979
34	"The Vanished Village at the Bottom of the Lake" (湖底に消えた村)	N/A	March 20, 1979
35	"Bridge of Friendship" (友情の橋)	N/A	March 27, 1979
36	"Sculptor of the Forest" (森の彫刻師)	N/A	TBA
37	"Hero Hills" (勇者の丘)	N/A	TBA
38	"The Violin that Sings in the Heart" (心にうたうヴァイオリン)	"The Dancing Bear"	TBA
39	"Goodnight, Prince" (おやすみなさい王子さま)	N/A	TBA

== Voices ==
Character	Japanese voice	English voice
Little Prince	Taiki Matsuno	Julie Dees, Katie Leigh
Rose Girl	Yoshiko Matsuo	Janet Waldo
Swifty (Bird)	Hiroshi Masuoka	Hal Smith
Saten	Keiko Yokozawa	
Boss	Kazue Takahashi	
Peter	Kaoru Kurosu	
Old Man	Minoru Yada	
Danya		Janet Waldo
Narrator	Masaaki Yajima	Robert Ridgely, Jack Angel

=== Additional English voices ===
- Jack Angel
- Peter Cullen
- Walker Edmiston
- Robert Ridgely
- Janet Waldo
- Pamela Ziolowski

== DVD releases ==
In September 2005, Koch Vision released a 4-disc DVD of the entire English series in Region 1. Koch Vision has subsequently begun releasing the series in Volumes each containing 3 or 4 episodes each, which sell at a lower cost than the complete series.

Discotek Media released all 26 episodes of the English dub on DVD on October 31, 2017. Later on December 6, Discotek Media uploaded the first episode of the Japanese version with English subtitles to YouTube, and on May 16, 2019, the entire Japanese version was added to Crunchyroll. The anime later made its debut on Retrocrush.

DVD name	Ep #	Release date
The Complete Animated Series	26	September 6, 2005
The complete English language series	26	October 31, 2017

In September 2019, the English dub of the series was made available on Amazon Prime.

== See also ==
- List of The Little Prince adaptations, a listing of The Little Prince story adapted into various media.
- The Little Prince (1974 film), a 1974 musical film directed by Stanley Donen
- The Little Prince (2015 film), a 2015 animated fantasy film directed by Mark Osborne
- The Little Prince (play), a theatrical adaptation
- The Little Prince (opera), an opera in two acts by Rachel Portman to an English libretto by Nicholas Wright
- The Little Prince and the Aviator, a 1981 musical theatre adaptation
- Antoine de Saint-Exupéry category listing of articles
