= Glastonbury Extravaganza =

Performing arts festival in Somerset, England

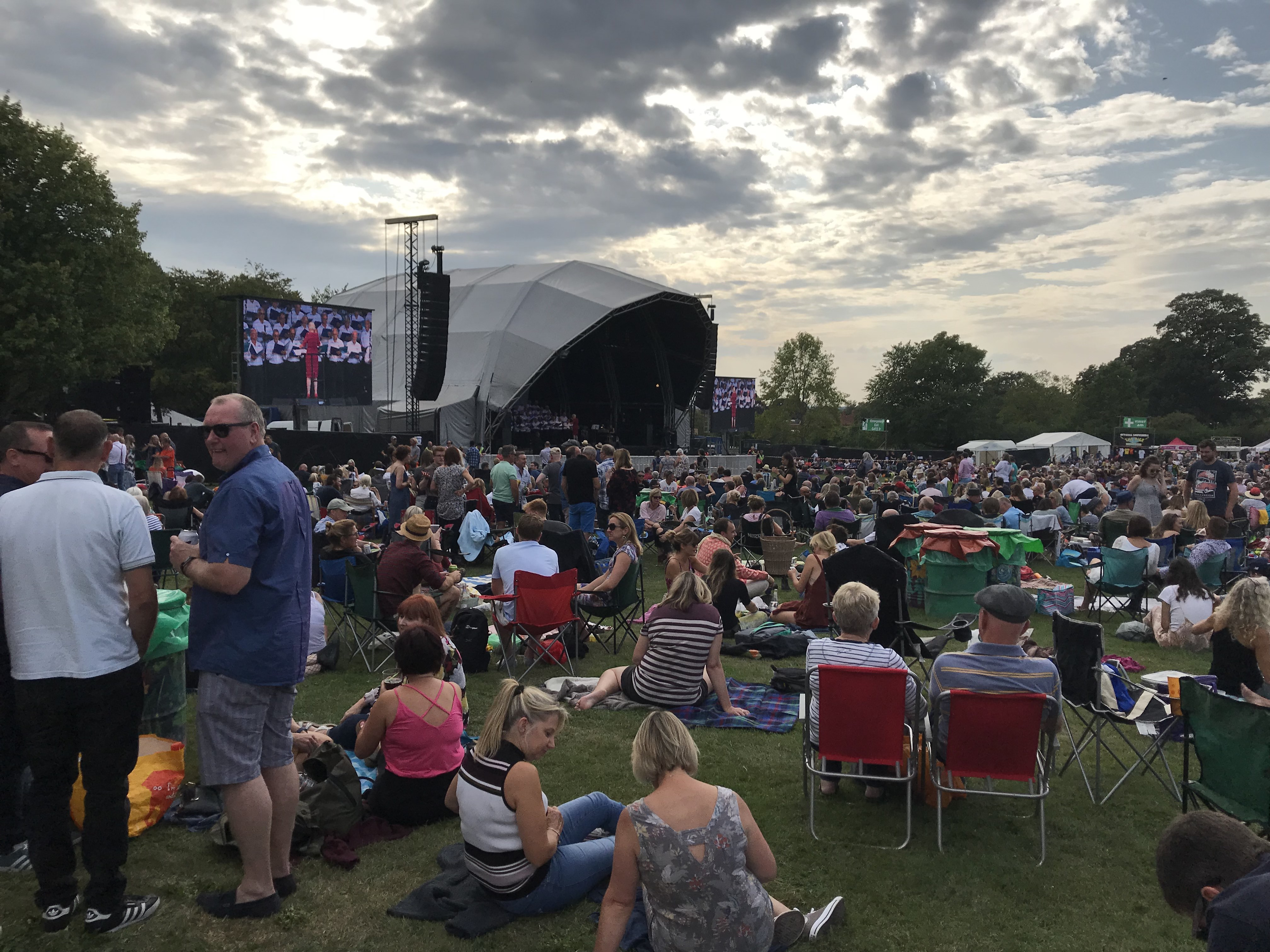
- Glastonbury Extravaganza in the early evening
- Genre: Music festival
- Frequency: Mostly annually, with some fallow years.
- Locations: Glastonbury Abbey, England
- Coordinates: 51°08′43.8″N 02°42′51.84″W
- Years active: 30 years
- Inaugurated: 1996
- Founder: Michael Eavis
- Most recent: 2023
- Next event: 2024
- Participants: See performers
- Attendance: 10,000
- Organiser: Glastonbury Festivals Ltd.
- Website: glastonburyabbey.com

Glastonbury Extravaganza (also known as Glastonbury Abbey Extravaganza and previously as Glastonbury Classical Extravaganza) is an annual music event held in the grounds of Glastonbury Abbey in Glastonbury, England since 1996. The event is held as a thank you to local people from Glastonbury Festival organiser Michael Eavis.

The event started life as a classical music concert – expanding out to three days and moving into a mix of classical, pop and rock music. Since 2013 it has returned to a single Saturday night format, but retained a popular music theme. The current format of the event is that the grounds open at 16:30, a local choir opens the proceedings at around 17:00 followed by a number of acts leading up to the headliner, followed by a firework display to close the evening at around 22:00. People bring their own food and drink to set up picnics, and there are a number of award winning Street Food trucks in the Abbey grounds, some of which also trade at the famous Glastonbury Festival. Extravaganza is one of three events organised by Eavis each year. The other events are the major Glastonbury Festival and the small-scale Pilton Party, held in Pilton.

== Performers ==
Year	Date	Headline Artist	Support Act(s)
1996			Pendyrus Male Choir
1997			Pendyrus Male Choir
1998			
1999			
2000			Pendyrus Male Choir
2001	Saturday 18 August 2001		Pendyrus Male Choir
2002			Pendyrus Male Choir
2003	Saturday 2 August 2003	Jools Holland and his Rhythm and Blues Orchestra	
2004	Friday 30 July 2004	Van Morrison	Pendyrus Male Choir
	Saturday 31 July 2004	The Royal Philharmonic Orchestra	
	Sunday 1 August 2004	Jools Holland and his Rhythm and Blues Orchestra	
2005	Friday 5 August 2005	Joss Stone	
	Saturday 6 August 2005	Nigel Kennedy, and The Royal Philharmonic Orchestra	
	Sunday 7 August 2005	The Rat Pack 'Live from Las Vegas'	
2006	Friday 4 August 2006	Jools Holland and his Rhythm and Blues Orchestra	
	Saturday 5 August 2006	The Royal Philharmonic Orchestra	
	Sunday 6 August 2006	The Rat Pack 'Live from Las Vegas'	
2007	Friday 10 August 2007	Van Morrison	Corinne Bailey Rae
	Saturday 11 August 2007	Charles Hazlewood conducting the Royal Philharmonic Orchestra	
	Sunday 12 August 2007	Ray Davies of The Kinks	Paolo Nutini
2008	Friday 8 August 2008	Squeeze	Lulu
	Saturday 9 August 2008	The Feeling	Kate Nash
2009	Saturday 8 August 2009	Status Quo	Bjorn Again
	Sunday 9 August 2009	Aled Jones with the Royal Philharmonic Orchestra	Jo Appleby, Andrew Rees, The Corelli Quartet
2010	Saturday 7 August 2010	Madness	Steve Harley and Cockney Rebel
	Sunday 8 August 2010	Royal Philharmonic Orchestra	Nicola Benedetti, Andrew Rees, Jo Appleby, RaVen Quartet
2011	Saturday 6 August 2011	Status Quo	Bootleg Beatles
	Sunday 7 August 2011	Katherine Jenkins, accompanied by the National Symphony Orchestra	Wynne Evans, The National Symphony Orchestra, Mendip Male Voice Choir
2012	Fallow Year – no event	The venue slot was instead used for the "Orchestra In A Field" event	
2013	Saturday 11 August 2013	Bryan Ferry and The Bryan Ferry Orchestra	Steve Harley & Cockney Rebel
2014	Saturday 9 August 2014	Sensational Space Shifters featuring Robert Plant	George Ezra, Wildflower
2015	Saturday 8 August 2015	Ray Davies of The Kinks	The Drystones, The Shires
2016	Saturday 6 August 2016	Van Morrison	Jamie Cullum
2017	Saturday 5 August 2017	Brian Wilson of the Beach Boys performing 'Pet Sounds'	Black Dyke Band, Corinne Bailey Rae
2018	Saturday 4 August 2018	Tom Odell	Glastonbury Brass
2019	Saturday 3 August 2019	The Specials	The Brue Boys, Lighthouse Family
2020	Saturday 1 August 2020	Cancelled Due to the COVID-19 pandemic	
2021	Saturday 4 September 2021	Van Morrison	The Staves. Tanita Tikaram, Glastonbury Male Voice Choir
2022	Saturday 6 August 2022	Paloma Faith	Seasick Steve
2023	Saturday 5 August 2023	Texas	Lightning Seeds, Wells City Band
2024	Saturday 10 August 2024	Keane	Hot House Flowers
2025	Saturday 9 August 2025	The Script	Freya Ridings, Steve Whalley, Wells Cathedral Oratorio Society

== Withdrawals ==
A number of artists have had to withdraw after the initial line-up was announced due to illness or scheduling conflicts.

Year	Artist
2009	Myleene Klass
2015	Joan Armatrading
2018	Paloma Faith

== Ticketing ==
Vouchers for the event usually go on sale in the December of the year before the event. These are available from the Glastonbury Abbey shop (online and in person). The announcement of who will be performing is then made in early May and the tickets are available from July onwards. The vouchers can only be exchanged for that year’s event.

Historical ticket price information
Year	Adult	Child
2019	£40	£25
2023	£45	£25
2024	£50	£25
