= Petit Prince =

Petit Prince (Little Prince) may refer to:

- Le Petit Prince, the original French title of the famous 1943 novella by writer and aviator Antoine de Saint-Exupéry, and which was released as The Little Prince in English
- Petit-Prince (moon), the moon of asteroid 45 Eugenia
- Petit Prince, a 2021 album by French rapper Larry

== See also ==
- Petit (disambiguation)
- Prince (disambiguation)
- Little Prince (disambiguation)
