= Joseph McManners =

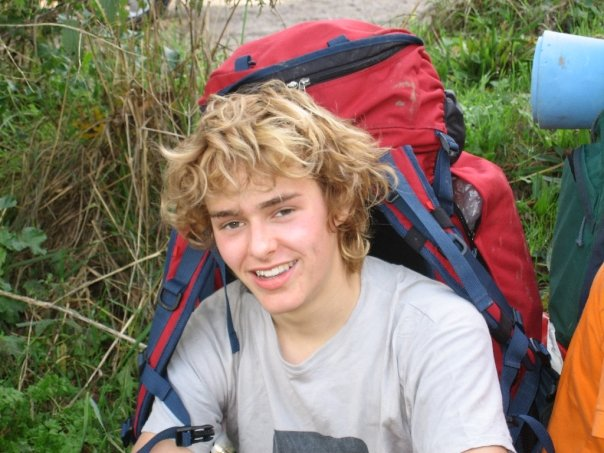
- McManners on a DofE trip, 2009

Background information
- Born: 3 December 1992 (age 33)
- Origin: Canterbury, Kent, England
- Genres: Classical, Opera, Pop
- Occupations: singer-songwriter, musician, actor
- Instruments: Vocals, piano, guitar, violin, percussion
- Years active: 2004–present
- Labels: Sony BMG, unsigned
- Website: www.josephmcmanners.com

Joseph McManners (born 3 December 1992) is an English singer-songwriter, musician and actor.

== Personal life ==
McManners is the son of musician and writer Hugh McManners and Deborah McManners.

== Singing career ==
At the age of eight, McManners heard the song "My Heart Will Go On" from the 1997 film Titanic.

Shortly after he sang the song at a family gathering, he realized that singing was what he wanted to do.

He plays the violin and the piano and is learning to play the guitar. At that age, he sang 'In Dreams', though it is not the version which is featured in The Lord of the Rings with Howard Shore as the composer.

McManners auditioned for the lead role in the BBC's operatic version of "The Little Prince" directed by Francesca Zambello and was chosen from 25000 others to play the part.

During filming for "The Little Prince", he was spotted by executives from Sony BMG, which led to a £2 million STG 4-album record deal.

McManners went to Prague with his producer Nick Patrick in 2005 to record the music for his first album, In Dreams. Most of the music was performed by the Prague Philharmonic Orchestra, and McManners' brother plays violin on "Where is Love". The album was released on 5 December 2005.

His debut album release reached number five in the classical charts within a few days. The album was nominated for "Album of the Year" at the 2006 Classical BRIT Awards and the release of "Bright Eyes" from the same album debuted at number one in Asian airplay.

In 2006, McManners was a guest singer at Liam Lawton's live concert held at the Dublin docklands, an event attended by almost 5,000 people. The orchestral arrangements were done by composer and arranger Nick Ingman.

== Acting career ==
In 2004, McManners starred as Oliver Twist in a local production of the play at Canterbury's Marlowe Theatre opposite Ron Moody who played Fagin in the 1968 film adaptation of the famous novel. He reprised his role as Oliver Twist two years later in the BBC's "Celebrate 'Oliver!'" presented by Shane Richie on 26 December 2005, and he appeared in an episode of BBC's The Sound of Musicals on 4 February 2006 (filmed in 2005).

McManners made his feature film acting debut in Hot Fuzz. He played the part of Gabriel who is described as being an 'angelic schoolboy'. The back-story and sub-plot surrounding his character was cut from the final version and can be found in the bonus material of the DVD. One reporter noted shortly after the film's release in early 2007 that because of McManners' age, he was unable to legally view the film until his 15th birthday later that year.

It was also reported that McManners had turned down an earlier offer in 2005 to star as the young Hannibal Lecter in the Hollywood film about the serial killer's childhood called Hannibal Rising due to school and other commitments.

McManners is now doing a YouTube channel called Climate Action News with Joe McManners.

== Discography ==
=== Albums ===
- In Dreams (2005)

== See also ==
- The Little Prince (opera)
- Hot Fuzz
