= Tsakane Valentine Maswanganyi =

South African classical soprano (born 1979)

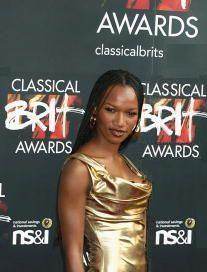

Background information
- Born: 1979 (age 46–47); Soweto, South Africa
- Genres: Classical
- Occupation: Soprano
- Formerly of: Amici Forever

Tsakane Valentine Maswanganyi (born 14 February 1979) is a South African classical soprano. She first came to public notice as a member of the opera band Amici Forever.

== Early life ==
Maswanganyi was born and grew up in a township in Soweto, where she lived with her grandparents for the first eight years of her life. Her grandmother worked as a schoolteacher and her grandfather was a priest. At that time South Africa was still segregated under the laws of apartheid. Maswanganyi stated of that experience, "I'd say my family had the middle-class black person's life in Soweto – which is different from the middle-class person's life in the white community. Soweto has a different spirit. There used to be shootings, but I didn't experience that directly. Sometimes the army would come by in cars and let off tear gas. We'd be playing in the garden and suddenly you'd have to get inside and lock the doors. Sometimes the police would come and start knocking and bashing doors in for no reason. In those days, people were not allowed to have visitors – even your cousins or family – you'd have to have some kind of permission to have people visit you."

At eight years old, Maswanganyi moved to Giyani in northern South Africa to live with her parents. She remained there through her teenage years. While there she attended high school for a few years at Risinga High School, but the Bantu school system did not provide any lessons in music to their pupils. She was, however, an active member of her church choir which was directed by her mother and performed a cappella music in the African choral tradition. As a result, Maswanganyi had very little exposure to classical music and was unable to read music when she entered University of Pretoria with the aspirations of pursuing a degree in music. Her lack of experience prevented her from being accepted as a music major. However, a one-year "bridge" course for music at the university enabled her to supplement her lack of musical knowledge and eventually join the program.

== Career ==
In her fourth and final year at the University of Pretoria, Maswanganyi began performing in the opera chorus at the State Theatre in Pretoria. Following graduation, she continued her operatic training at the Pretoria Technikon for three years. She portrayed the title role in a student production of Emmerich Kálmán's Gräfin Mariza during her first year in the program. Her performance led to an invitation to reprise the role for her professional opera debut with the Roodepoort City Opera. Other opportunities soon followed, including recitals given for Nelson Mandela and Thabo Mbeki and a performance for the United Nations delegates at the Earth Summit 2002 in Johannesburg.

After completing her studies at the Pretoria Technikon, Maswanganyi sang the role of Maria in a performance of West Side Story for Spier Opera Company in Cape Town. Soon after she helped form Amici Forever with which she released two successful albums, The Opera Band (2004) and Defined (2005). The group also toured Australia and New Zealand in 2006 and the United Kingdom in both 2006 and 2007.

Maswanganyi is also active as a solo artist on both the concert and opera stages. She has given recitals for Presidents Thabo Mbeki and Nelson Mandela. Some of her operatic roles are Musetta (La bohème), Valencienne (The Merry Widow), Amelia (Amelia al Ballo), Arminda (La finta giardiniera) and Contessa Ceprano (Rigoletto). Some highlights of her career include the title role in Carmen Jones with the London Philharmonic at Royal Festival Hall and Bess in Porgy and Bess at the Cape Town Opera, Deutsche Oper Berlin, and Norwegian National Opera. In April 2011, she portrayed the title role in the world premiere of Bongani Ndodana-Breen's Winnie: The Opera at the State Theatre in Pretoria.

As of 2011, Maswanganyi resides in Italy where she is a voice student of mezzo-soprano Nadiya Petrenko.

== Discography ==
- The Opera Band (2004, Amici Forever)
- Defined (2005, Amici Forever)
