= Princess (US automobile) =

Defunct American motor vehicle manufacturer

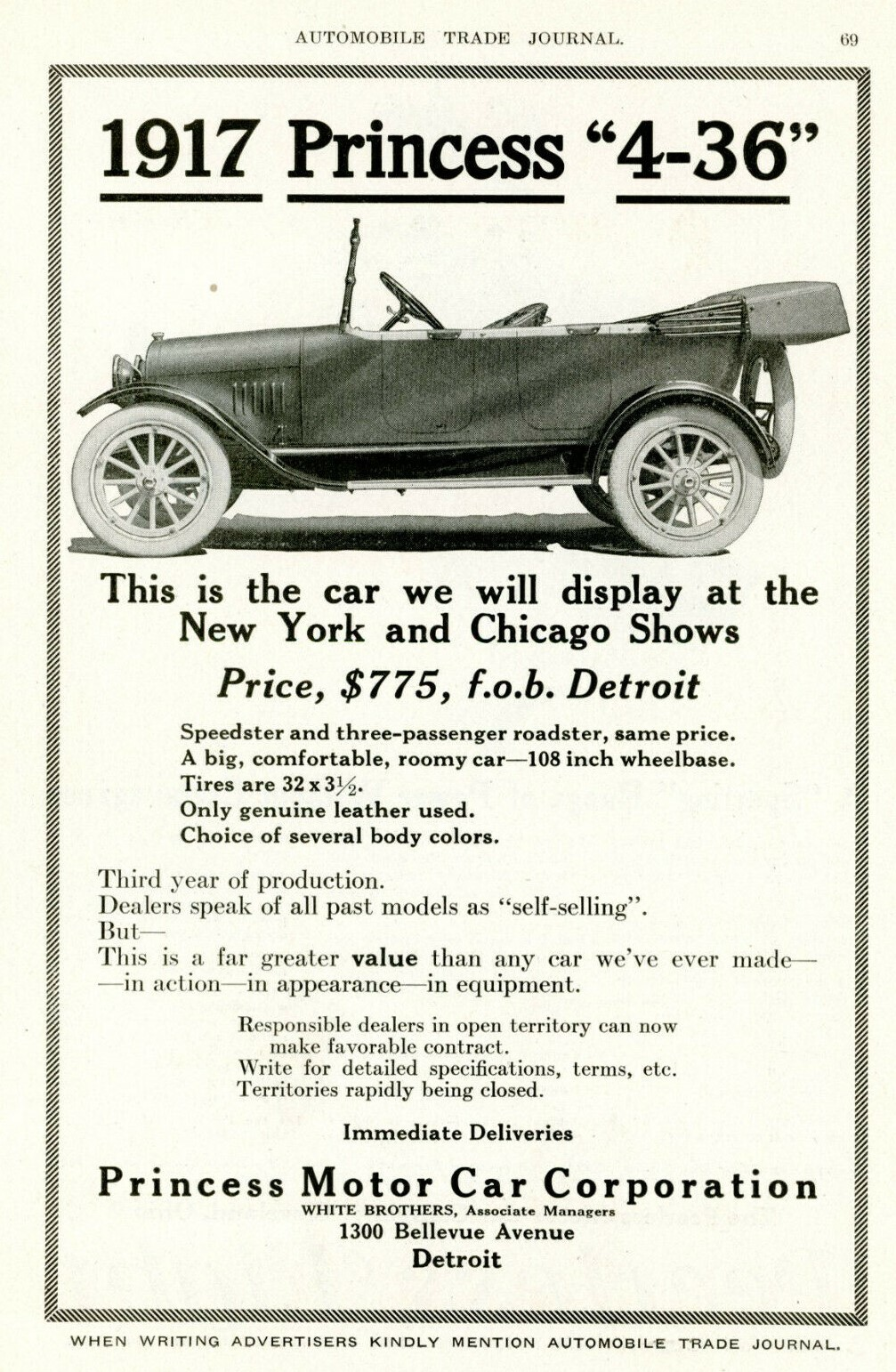
1917 Princess Touring Ad

The Princess was an automobile built in Detroit, Michigan by the Princess Motor Car Company from 1914 until 1918.

== History ==
The original Little Princess was a cyclecar that was altered into a light or small car and renamed the Princess. It was powered by a 1.6-liter Farmer engine.

In 1915, the company bought the Saxon factory and began production of roadster and touring automobiles with a four-cylinder 24hp G B & S engine. Prices were moderate at $775, equivalent to $19,476 in 2025. The company ceased production in 1918.
