= Amici Forever =

Band of four classically trained singers

- Origin: United Kingdom
- Genres: Opera; Pop; Operatic Pop
- Years active: 2002–present
- Labels: Sony/BMG, Arista, RCA
- Members: Lucy van Gasse; Bruno Santino; David Habbin; Tsakane Valentine
- Past members: Nick Garrett; Geoff Sewell; Jo Appleby

Amici Forever is a band of four classically trained singers who mix opera with pop music (operatic pop). The band's first album, The Opera Band (2004), reached number one on the Australian classical charts, number two on the United States (US) classical charts and the top 5 in the United Kingdom (UK) classical charts.

== History ==
The members of Amici Forever met when rehearsing and performing at opera venues around the world. The band currently features a tenor, a baritone, and two soprano singers. In 2002 tenor Geoff Sewell, originally from New Zealand, alongside renowned classical crossover manager Nadia Raibin came up with the idea of an "opera band" mixing traditional opera with contemporary pop. One of the original five members, Nick Garrett, a bass-baritone, left the group in August 2005 to pursue a solo career, shortly after the release of Defined. Tenor Geoff Sewell left the group in February 2006 after his daughter Sienna was diagnosed with an autism spectrum disorder (ASD). This was just after the highly successful tour of Australia and New Zealand. Amici Forever have celebrated two No 1 albums with The Opera Band and Defined in Geoff Sewell's homeland of New Zealand. He was replaced with Brazilian Italian baritone Bruno Santino. On 20 September 2006 it was announced on the Amici Forever website that Jo Appleby would be leaving the group to pursue a career as a solo artist. Lucy van Gasse was introduced as the newest member of Amici in February 2007.

Amici Forever signed with Arista Records and started playing high-profile gigs such as the FA Cup, the UEFA Champions League final in 2003 and the English rugby union final. Nick Patrick, who had produced albums by the Gipsy Kings, Tina Turner and Marvin Gaye produced the band's first album, The Opera Band.

The Opera Band was released on 13 January 2004 and soon reached number 74 in the Billboard 200 album charts and the top 50 of the ARIA Australian album charts. The album has also reached number 2 on the Billboard Classical Crossover and Heatseeker charts. It became number one on the ARIA Australian classical album chart, as well as the top 5 on the UK classical charts. In addition it peaked at #39 in the UK Albums Chart. The album was nominated for "Album of the Year" at the Classical Brit Awards held at the Royal Albert Hall on 26 May 2004 where they also performed the album's signature song 'Prayer in the Night', composed by James Shearman based on Handel's Sarabande, with lyrics by Sam Babenia.

=== Members ===
As of February 2007, the band consisted of:

- Lucy van Gasse (England) (soprano), born in Nailsea, Somerset. She has a Bachelor of Music from Cardiff University and a Master of Music from Royal Welsh College of Music and Drama.
- Tsakane Valentine Maswanganyi (soprano), born in Johannesburg, South Africa. She studied music at Pretoria University and had operatic training at the University of Tshwane. She appeared in performances for Nelson Mandela and Thabo Mbeki and starred as Maria (the lead role) in West Side Story for Spier Opera Company in Cape Town.
- David Habbin (tenor), born in Fordingbridge, Hampshire. He spent several years writing and performing with Pop rock bands. He then began vocal training with international operatic tenor, Jon Andrew. He completed his studies of acting and musical theatre at Mountview Theatre School in North London. He was in performances of Les Misérables and West Side Story on tour and in west London before finishing his operatic training at the Royal Northern College of Music in Manchester. David then performed with different UK opera companies, one of which was the Glyndebourne Festival Opera for their Summer Festival and touring company.
- Bruno Santino (baritone), born in Belo Horizonte, Brazil. Santino originally studied chemical engineering. After being invited to sing in six different choirs, he decided to start learning music instead and began at CEFAR Music School. Bruno won scholarships to the Guildhall School of Music and Drama and completed a master's degree in Music Performance there, as well as a Post Graduate Diploma in Vocal Training with distinction.

== Discography ==
=== Studio albums ===
List of studio albums, with selected chart positions and certifications
Title	Album details	Peak chart positions		Certifications (sales thresholds)
Title	Album details	AUS	NZ	Certifications (sales thresholds)
The Opera Band	Released: 2003; Label: RCA Victor; Format: CD	2	1	ARIA: 2xPlatinum
Defined	Released: 2005; Label: RCA Victor; Format: CD	4	1	ARIA: Gold

=== Video albums ===
List of video albums, with selected chart positions and certifications
Title	Album details	Peak chart positions	Certifications (sales thresholds)
Title	Album details	AUS	Certifications (sales thresholds)
In Concert	Released: 2006; Label: RCA Victor; Format: DVD	15	ARIA: Gold
