= Liam Lawton =

The Reverend Liam Lawton
- Occupation: Singer / Roman Catholic priest
- Years active: 2004–present
- Label: EMI
- Website: liamlawton.com

Liam Lawton is an Irish Catholic singer-songwriter and priest.

== Education ==
He received his theological training at St Patrick's College, Maynooth, where he was influenced by Sean Lavery, the Director of Sacred Music. He was ordained in 1984 and was based in a parish in Carlow. He later worked as a teacher at St Mary's Knockbeg College.

== Musical career ==
Discovered in 2004 by record giants EMI who signed him for a number of albums. His EMI début, Another World, was released in Ireland later that year. This album achieved double platinum status and was followed by his second album Time which also was hugely successful. Time was recorded by Martin Quinn at JAM Studios, Ireland and with the National Philharmonic Orchestra in the city of Prague. Lawton's music has been recognized for its unique quality. His choral music is used by choirs all over the English-speaking world and has been translated into Spanish, German and Swedish.

In the year 2000 his work was recognized in the United States when he was invited to compose a work for the Irish American community in Chicago under the patronage of Mayor Richard Daley and his wife Maggie. This work was performed in Chicago Symphony Center with narrator screen veteran Gregory Peck. In the 10 years of the events existence Liam is the only composer that has been invited to return at least four times and has had such guest artists as John Cusack and John Malkovich narrate his work. Over this time Liam has also toured Sweden and Norway achieving top ten status in the Norwegian Charts.

In 2006, Lawton performed and record his new compositions. Set in Dublin’s docklands this event was the first of its kind to be staged on water in Ireland's capital. The concert which took place over two nights was recorded for high definition DVD/CD release in to the US and Worldwide markets in 2007. This unique special event, with a stunning stage design by Alan Farquharson, featured guests Roisin O'Reilly and boy soprano Joseph McManners, the full Irish Film Orchestra and Chorus along with traditional Irish instruments. The event was attended by almost 5,000 people. The orchestral arrangements were done by the world-renowned composer and arranger Nick Ingman whose films include Shakespeare in Love, Cold Mountain, Billy Elliot and Finding Neverland.
