= Antoine de Saint-Exupéry Youth Foundation =

French philanthropic organization

- Fondation Antoine de Saint-Exupéry pour la Jeunesse
- Abbreviation: FASEJ
- Formation: 2009; 17 years ago
- Founder: Estate of Antoine de Saint-Exupéry (d'Agay family)
- Type: Charitable foundation
- Purpose: Education, youth empowerment, philanthropy, literacy
- Headquarters: Paris, France
- Location: France
- Key people: Olivier de Giraud d'Agay (President)
- Parent organization: Fondation de France
- Website: www.fasej.org/en/

The Antoine de Saint-Exupéry Youth Foundation (French: Fondation Antoine de Saint-Exupéry pour la Jeunesse, FASEJ) is a French international philanthropic organization. Established in 2009 under the auspices of the Fondation de France, it was founded by the family and heirs of the French writer and aviator Antoine de Saint-Exupéry to perpetuate his moral and philosophical legacy.

Conceived as the charitable extension of the author's literary work—most notably his philosophical tale The Little Prince—the foundation is dedicated to supporting educational, cultural, and social projects for disadvantaged youth. Its primary areas of action include combating illiteracy, promoting vocational training, and improving cultural accessibility for people with disabilities.

== History ==
The creation of the foundation is part of the broader structuring of Antoine de Saint-Exupéry's legacy by his heirs. In the late 2000s, the writer's estate, represented by his nephew and godson François d'Agay, and Olivier de Giraud d'Agay, director of the civil society managing the author's copyrights (POMASE), sought to expand the estate's role beyond the legal and financial management of his literary rights.

== Missions and areas of action ==
The FASEJ primarily targets children and young adults growing up in vulnerable or precarious environments. Its philanthropic efforts are structured around three main pillars: formal education, social inclusion through sports and culture, and applied accessibility for the disabled.

=== Education and the fight against illiteracy ===
The foundation finances the construction of schools, vocational training centers, and mobile libraries (bibliobuses) worldwide. Geographically, a significant portion of its funding is directed toward countries historically connected to the Aéropostale aviation routes (Europe, West Africa, and South America), as well as Asia.

Notable initiatives include supporting the NGO SIPAR in Cambodia to improve access to reading and establishing vocational training programs in Morocco. In the region of Tarfaya (formerly Cape Juby, a pivotal location in Saint-Exupéry's life as an airmail station manager), the foundation has funded the training of local youth in aeronautical mechanics and regional tourism.

=== Cultural accessibility and disability ===
To make Saint-Exupéry's literary heritage accessible to all, the FASEJ heavily invests in inclusion projects for visually impaired youth. The foundation coordinates the design, production, and distribution of tactile editions and Braille transcriptions of Saint-Exupéry's works. These specialized books incorporate high-precision relief drawings, allowing blind and visually impaired children to experience the author's famous original watercolors through touch.

== Governance and partnerships ==
The foundation is governed by an executive committee, chaired by Olivier de Giraud d'Agay, which reviews and approves projects submitted by local NGOs and grassroots associations.

The foundation's funding relies heavily on a network of corporate sponsors and charity auctions. Since its inception in 2009, the FASEJ has forged strategic partnerships with major players in the aviation sector (such as Air France) and the luxury watchmaking industry. The Swiss watch manufacturer IWC Schaffhausen serves as one of its primary benefactors; the brand regularly develops limited "Edition Le Petit Prince" aviator watches. Unique, numbered models of these timepieces are frequently auctioned through houses like Sotheby's, with the entirety of the proceeds donated to the foundation's educational projects.

== See also ==
- Antoine de Saint-Exupéry
- The Little Prince
- Fondation de France
