= Little Princess (automobile) =

Defunct American motor vehicle manufacturer

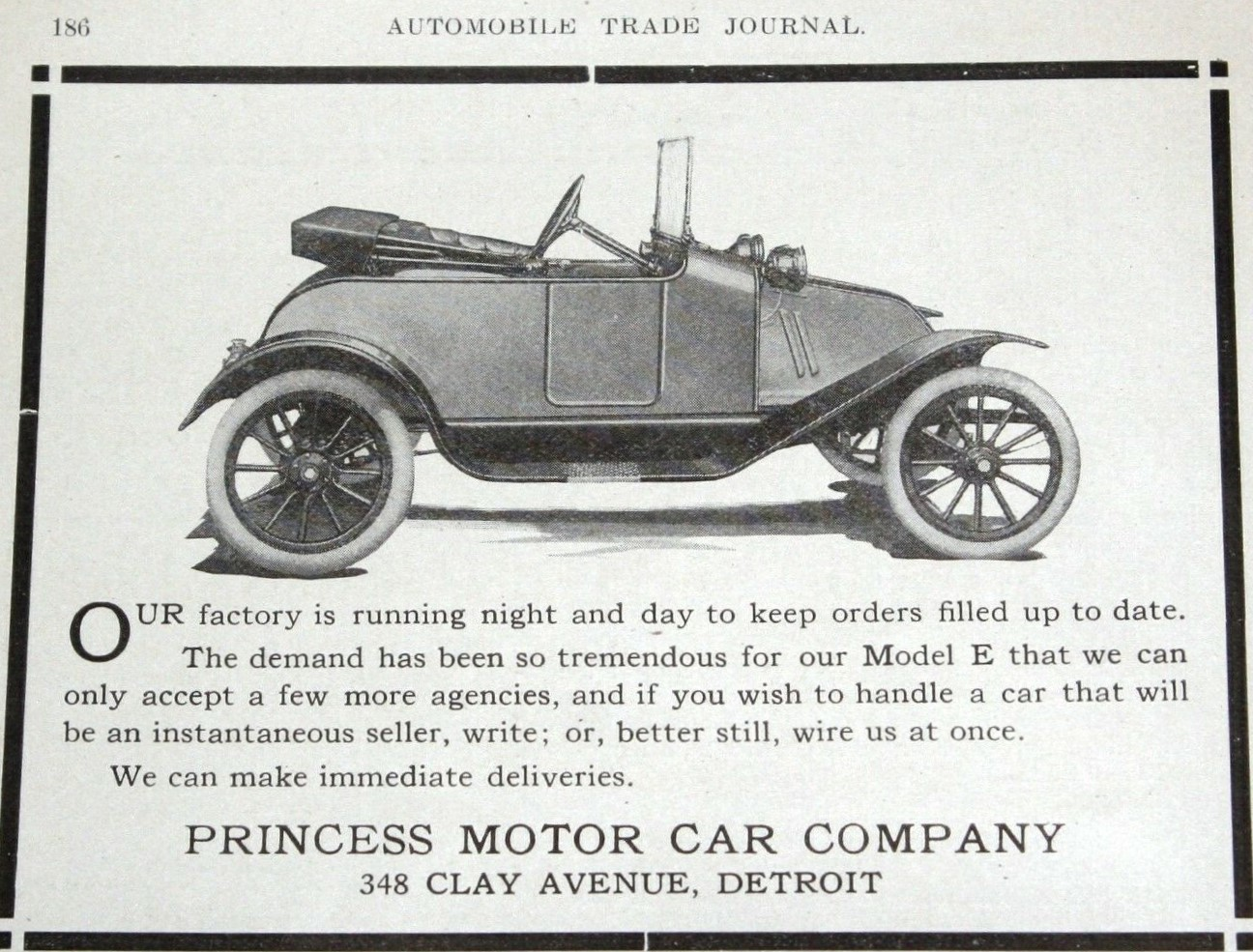
1913 Little Princess Cyclecar

The Little Princess was a cyclecar built in Detroit, Michigan, by the Princess Cyclecar Company from 1913–14.

== History ==
The Little Princess was designed by Englishman C. J. Thornwell who had worked for Wolseley-Siddeley before coming to America. The cyclecar was powered by a four-cylinder 12hp Farmer engine. A planetary transmission was used with a shaft drive making more substantial than chain driven cyclecars. The cyclecar was only sold in 1914 before the design was used to develop the Princess light car.
