= Museum of The Little Prince in Hakone =

Museum in Japan (1999–2023)

Coordinates: 35°16′0.6″N 139°0′47.8″E

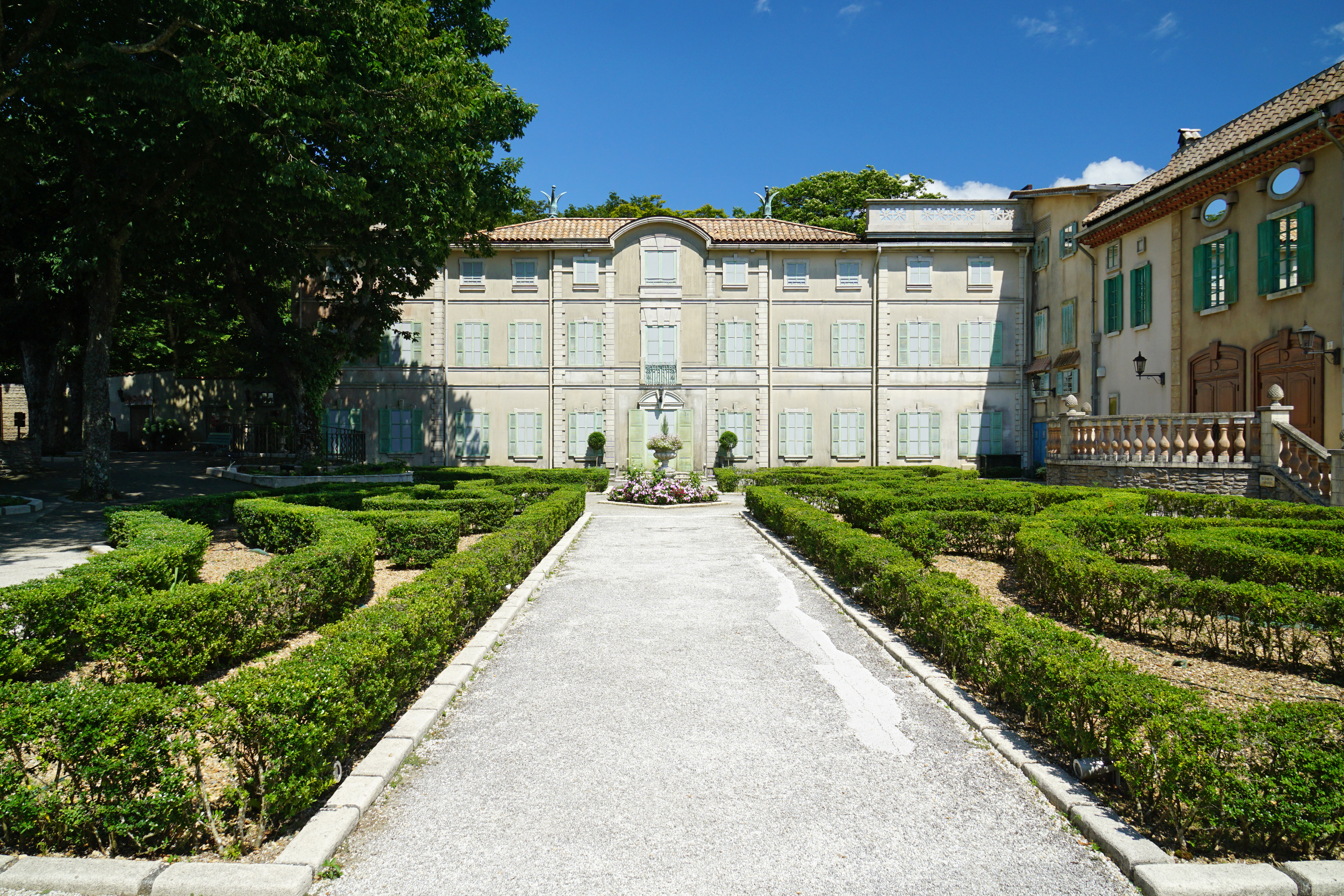
Museum of The Little Prince in Hakone

The Museum of The Little Prince in Hakone (星の王子さまミュージアム, Hoshi no Ōjisama Myūjiamu) (French: Musée du Petit Prince de Saint-Exupéry à Hakone) was a museum in Sengokuhara, Hakone, Kanagawa Prefecture, Japan dedicated to the character in the story The Little Prince by Antoine de Saint-Exupéry. The museum was opened on June 29, 1999 as part of a worldwide commemorative project to celebrate the 100th anniversary of Saint-Exupéry’s birth and closed down permanently on April 1, 2023. In a statement made by the museum, the lack of visitors due to the Covid-19 pandemic and the deterioration of the buildings presented as the reasons for the closure.
