= Nick Garrett (bass-baritone) =

English singer (born 1970)

Nick Garrett is an English bass-baritone. He was a member of the vocal ensemble, The Swingle Singers, and the original bass-baritone in the opera band Amici Forever.

== Biography ==
Garrett was born on 13 April 1970 in London and taught himself to play the piano at age seven. He studied singing, composition, piano and conducting at Trinity College of Music, with further study in singing supported by a grant from the Wolfson Foundation. He then joined The Swingle Singers and toured with them internationally. After leaving The Swingle Singers, he performed in some of the world's leading opera houses, including the Royal Opera House, the English National Opera, the Scottish Opera and the Opéra National de Paris. He has performed over fifty major roles, including Don Giovanni, Figaro, Colline and Scarpia. In 2002, he became one of the founding members of Amici Forever. Garrett left the ensemble in 2005 to continue his solo career and continues to sing on the opera stage as well as recording.

In 2007, Garrett played the Wolf/Cinderella's Prince in Into the Woods. In 2014, he returned to Into the Woods this time playing the Baker.

In 2023, he played Monsieur Firmin in the Greece production of The Phantom of the Opera and reprised the role for the international tour.
