= Sean Lavery (priest) =

Irish priest and musical director

Sean Lavery (1931–1999) was a Roman Catholic priest for the Missionary Society of St. Columban ("The Columbans") and a church music director.

Lavery was born in Lurgan, County Armagh.

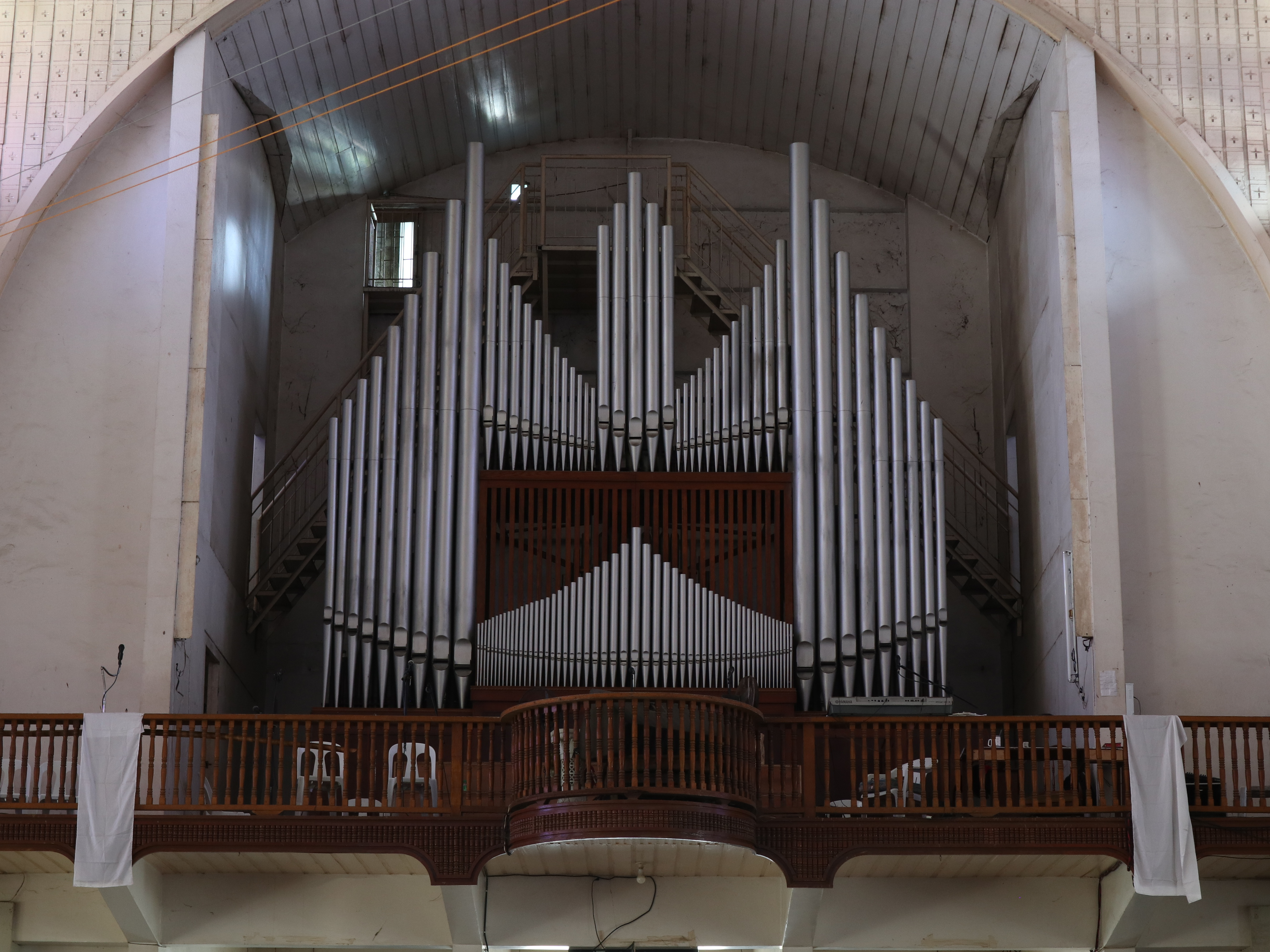
Immaculate Conception Pipe Organ

Shortly after his ordination in 1954, Father Lavery moved to the United States where he graduated from Manhattanville College, New York, with a degree in music. He transferred overseas and was appointed at the Metropolitan Cathedral of the Immaculate Conception in Ozamiz City in the Philippines. He held many posts, such as leading the liturgical and musical development for the diocese. As part of this effort, he commissioned Father Herman Schablitzki S.V.D. in designing of a pipe organ in Germany. The organ was exported from Europe and installed in the cathedral. Assisted by one carpenter and one electrician, Father Schablitzki assembled the organ in six weeks, and was completed on May 31, 1967. The pipe organ was then inaugurated on July 16, 1967. It is one of the few pipe organs in the Philippines. Though hardly intended at the time, this pipe organ has now become one of the singular tourist attractions for Ozamiz City and the Archdiocese of Ozamis.

Fr. Lavery left the Philippines in 1977 to study for his doctorate in sacred music in Rome. In 1980, he was transferred to Ireland where he assumed the post of Director of Sacred Music at St Patrick's College, Maynooth. A prolific composer, Father Lavery was passionate about Gregorian Chant and influenced many future musicians, including Father Liam Lawton, a popular singer/priest in Ireland He was a member of the Irish Church Music Association and was, from the spring of 1984 to the winter of 1987, editor of Jubilius, a Maynooth publication. He resigned his position to do parish work in Jamaica in 1987, where he rebuilt his church after it was destroyed by Hurricane Gilbert.

Father Lavery died in 1999. He was buried at the Columban Father House in Navan, County Meath on 29 March 1999. A church hall in Jamaica whose construction was partly financed by Lurgan people was opened in 2001, it was named "The Father Sean Lavery Faith Hall" in his memory at Savanna -La-Mar.
