= The Happy Prince =

The Happy Prince may refer to:

- The Happy Prince and Other Tales, a collection of stories for children by Oscar Wilde
  - "The Happy Prince" (story), the title story of the collection
- The Happy Prince (Bing Crosby and Orson Welles album), a 1946 studio album of phonograph records by Bing Crosby and Orson Welles of the Oscar Wilde short story "The Happy Prince"
- The Happy Prince, a 1965 opera by Malcolm Williamson based on the short story
- The Happy Prince (The La De Das album), a 1969 album by New Zealand rock band The La De Da's
- The Happy Prince (1974 film), an animated short film adaptation of the short story by Oscar Wilde
- The Happy Prince (2018 film), a British biographical drama film about Oscar Wilde
