= The Opera Band =

Studio album by Amici Forever
- Released: 2003
- Genre: Classical
- Length: 47:46
- Label: RCA
- Producers: Nick Garrett, Nick Patrick, Matt Howe, Rick Blaskey & James Shearman

Amici Forever chronology
The Opera Band (2003)	Defined (2005)

The Opera Band is the debut album by Amici Forever released in 2004.

== Making of the album ==
The members of Amici Forever met when rehearsing and performing at opera venues around the world. Tenor Geoff Sewell, originally from New Zealand, came up with the idea of an "opera band" mixing traditional opera with contemporary pop. The band features two tenors, two soprano singers and a bass-baritone singer.

Amici Forever signed with Arista Records and started playing high-profile gigs such as the FA Cup final and the English rugby union final. Nick Patrick, who had produced albums by the Gipsy Kings, Tina Turner and Marvin Gaye produced the band's first album The Opera Band. The album mixes opera classics such as "Nessun Dorma" with pop standards such as "Unchained Melody" and "Requiem for a Soldier" from the Band of Brothers soundtrack.

== Track listing ==
1. "Prayer in the Night" (based on Handel's "Sarabande")
2. "Senza Catene (Unchained Melody)"
3. "Canto Alla Vita"
4. "Vita Mia"
5. "Requiem for a Soldier "
6. "Whisper of Angels" (based on Faure's "Pavane")
7. "The Pearl Fishers"
8. "Soave Sia Il Vento"
9. "Nimrod: Lux Æterna"
10. "Song to the Moon"
11. "Zadok the Priest"
12. "Nessun Dorma"
13. "Adeste Fidelis"
14. "Olympia: Eternal Flame" (bonus track used as theme to BBC's 2004 Olympic Games coverage)

== Charts ==
=== Weekly chart ===
Chart (2004)	Peak position
Australian Albums (ARIA)	2
New Zealand Albums (RMNZ)	1
Swedish Albums (Sverigetopplistan)	26

=== Year-end chart ===
Chart (2004)	Position
Australian (ARIA Charts)	40

== Certifications ==
Region	Certification	Certified units/sales
Australia (ARIA)	2× Platinum	140,000^{^}
New Zealand (RMNZ)	2× Platinum	30,000^{^}
^{^} Shipments figures based on certification alone.
