= Jo Appleby =

British singer (born 1974)

Jo Abbleby
- Born: Joanne Appleby; 7 April 1974 (age 52); Blackpool, Lancashire, England
- Origin: Thornton, Lancashire, England
- Genres: Pop, crossover, classical
- Occupation: Soprano singer
- Instrument: Singing
- Label: Calibre Productions
- Formerly of: Amici Forever

Jo Appleby (born 7 April 1974) is an English soprano from Thornton, Lancashire, England. She is a former member of operatic pop group Amici Forever.

== Life ==
Jo Appleby was born in Blackpool, Lancashire. She began studying opera, aged nineteen, at the Royal Northern College of Music, where, four years later, she gained an honours degree. She then won a scholarship from the D'Oyly Carte Opera Company before embarking on an operatic career. She spent four years performing with the Glyndebourne Festival Opera and Touring Opera Company, as well as singing at venues such as the Royal Albert Hall and the Royal Festival Hall.

In 2002 she was signed by Sony BMG as an original member of the opera group Amici Forever. She toured with the group until September 2006 when she left to pursue a solo career. Since leaving the group she has toured Australia, Dubai and New Zealand as a soloist with The Morriston Orpheus Male voice choir. In 2007, she was involved in a concert tour of the United Kingdom, and the "It's Magic" Christmas concert. Appleby is performs with the English National Opera at the London Coliseum.
