= Defined (album) =

Studio album by Amici Forever
- Released: 16 December 2005
- Label: RCA Victor

Amici Forever chronology
The Opera Band (2004)	Defined (2005)

Defined is an album by popera group Amici Forever released in 2005.

== Track listing ==
1. "La Fiamma Sacra (The Sacred Flame)"
2. "Nella Fantasia"
3. "The Prayer"
4. "Aranjuez Ma Pensee"
5. "So Far Away"
6. "Nostalgia (La Mia Nostalgia)"
7. "Core'ngrato (Ungrateful Heart)"
8. "Land & Freedom (Terra e Liberta)"
9. "Mon cœur s'ouvre à ta voix"
10. "Recondita Armonia"
11. "Adagio"
12. "Ocean Heart (Oceano Cuore)"
13. "We Are The Champions"

== Australian Tour Edition ==
The 2006 Australian Tour Edition includes Frankie Goes To Hollywood's "The Power Of Love" as Track 13, with Queen's "We Are The Champions" moved to Track 14.

== Charts ==
=== Weekly charts ===
Chart (2005)	Peak position
Australian Albums (ARIA)	4
New Zealand Albums (RMNZ)	1

=== Year-end charts ===
Chart (2005)	Position
Australian Albums (ARIA)	87

== Certifications ==
Region	Certification	Certified units/sales
Australia (ARIA)	Gold	35,000^{^}
^{^} Shipments figures based on certification alone.
