= The Little Prince and the Aviator =

- Music: John Barry
- Lyrics: Don Black
- Book: Hugh Wheeler
- Basis: Novel by Antoine de Saint-Exupéry; The Little Prince
- Productions: 1981 Broadway never officially opened

The Little Prince and the Aviator is a musical with a book by Hugh Wheeler, lyrics by Don Black, and music by John Barry.

Based on the book by Antoine de Saint-Exupéry, the musical deviates from the original in that aviator Toni, whose plane crashes in the Sahara Desert, explicitly is real-life author Saint-Exupéry, and the plot alternates flashbacks to actual events in his life with his interaction with the fictional Little Prince, a refugee from Asteroid B-612.

Undaunted by the critical and commercial failure of the 1974 musical screen adaptation by Lerner and Loewe, A. Joseph Tandet, a co-producer of the movie who owned the rights to the story, proceeded with his plans for a Broadway production. To save money, he decided to forgo an out-of-town tryout.

Previews were originally scheduled to begin on December 31, 1981, at the Alvin Theatre. The first preview was canceled at the last minute, after a change in both director and choreographer late in the rehearsal period; the production actually began previews on January 1, 1982. Late in rehearsals, Robert Kalfin was replaced as director by Jerry Adler and Billy Wilson replaced original choreographer Dania Krupska. The production starred Michael York as the Aviator and Anthony Rapp as the Little Prince, with Ellen Greene in a supporting role and Gordon Greenberg as young Georges. The show closed after twenty previews.

Tandet sued the Nederlander Organization, claiming they had forced him to shut down the production with their demands for more money during its final week. He eventually was awarded $1,000,000, representing two-thirds of his investment.

== Song list ==
Act I

- Par Avion - Toni, Georges and Suzanne
- Power Comes, Power Goes - Snake
- I Pity the Poor Poor Parisiennes - Toni
- Making Every Minute Count - Toni, Georges and Pilots
- Made for Each Other - Toni and Rose
- Wind, Sand, Stars - Toni, Georges and Pilots
- First Impressions - Little Prince
- A Day Will Never Be the Same - Fennec and Pilots
- I've Got You to Thank for All This - Suzanne
- I Don't Regret a Thing - Toni
- We Couldn't We Mustn't We Won't - Toni, Suzanne as a Child and Georges as a Child

Act II

- Watch Out for the Baobabs - Little Prince
- I Like My Misfortunes to Be Taken Seriously - Toni
- The Volcano Song - Little Prince
- More Than Just a Pretty Flower - Rose
- First Impressions (Reprise) - Little Prince
- The Volcano Song (Reprise) - Little Prince
- Playground of the Planets - Little Prince
- It Was You - Georges
- Grain of Sand - Little Prince
- I Don't Regret a Thing (Reprise) - Toni
- Sunset Song - Little Prince
- Little Prince/Stars Will Be Laughing - Toni and Little Prince
