= The Little Prince (opera) =

Opera by Rachel Portman

- Opera by Rachel Portman
- Librettist: Nicholas Wright
- Language: English
- Based on: The Little Prince by Antoine de Saint-Exupéry
- Premiere: 31 May 2003; Wortham Theater Center

The Little Prince, subtitled A Magical Opera, is a children's opera in two acts by Rachel Portman to an English libretto by Nicholas Wright, based on the 1943 book of the same name by Antoine de Saint-Exupéry. It was first performed at Houston Grand Opera on 31 May 2003.

== History ==
The Little Prince was commissioned by Kathryn and David Berg in memory of their friend, Larry Pfeffer.

The original production was jointly produced and co-financed by several opera companies, including the Houston Grand Opera, the New York City Opera, the Boston Lyric Opera, Tulsa Opera, and the Skylight Opera Theatre. The opera premiered at the Houston Grand Opera in May 2003 with Nate Irvin as The Little Prince and Teddy Tahu Rhodes as the Pilot.

It was then performed by the Skylight Opera Theatre in Milwaukee, Wisconsin, and the Boston Lyric Opera with Jeffrey Walter as the Little Prince. Houston Grand Opera had a return engagement in December 2004 with Jeffrey Walter as the Little Prince and Jeffrey Allison. It was then performed at the University of Kentucky opera (April 2005), the New York City Opera (November 2005), Tulsa Opera, and the Santa Fe Opera. The San Francisco Opera and Cal Performances did a joint production at Zellerbach Hall in May 2008. Ithaca College Opera presented a production in February and March 2010.

In the United Kingdom, it was filmed by the BBC following a nationwide talent search for children to play the roles of the Prince, the Rose and a chorus of thirty-six vocalists. Over 25,000 children applied, with over 6,500 taking part in auditions. The television show Blue Peter documented the search for the singers, and filmed their training and rehearsals. The Little Prince was broadcast on BBC Two on 27 November 2004.

In May 2025 Pacific Opera Victoria presented the Canadian première in a new production directed by Brenda Corner. Andrew Love was the Pilot, and Callum Spivack and Jake Apricity Hetherington performed the role of the Little Prince.

== Roles ==
Roles, voice types, premiere cast
| Role | Voice type | Premiere cast, 31 May 2003 Conductor: Patrick Summers |
|---|---|---|
| The Little Prince | boy soprano | Nathaniel Irvin |
| The Pilot | baritone | Teddy Tahu Rhodes |
| The Fox | mezzo-soprano | Marie Lenormand |
| The Rose | soprano | Kristin Reiersen |
| The Water | soprano | Laquita Mitchell |
| The Snake/Vain Man | tenor | Robert Mack |
| Lamplighter/Drunkard (Note: Double as male quartet of Baobos in act 1 and as The Hunters in act 2) | tenor | Scott Scully |
| Businessman | baritone | Aaron Judisch |
| Geographer | baritone | Ethan Watermeier |
| The King | bass | Joshua Winograde |
Children's choir (Stars and Birds)
| Director | | Francesca Zambello |
| Costume and production design | | Maria Björnson |

The opera requires 2 flutes (2nd doubling piccolo), 1 oboe (doubling English horn), 2 clarinets (2nd doubling bass clarinet), 1 bassoon (doubling contrabassoon), 1 trumpet, 1 horn, 1 trombone, 2 percussionists, celesta, harp, string section. A performance lasts for about 1 hour 35 minutes.

== Recordings ==
Following the television broadcast, BBC in conjunction with Sony Classical released a double-CD and DVD of the complete production of The Little Prince in November 2004. Upon release, the CD set entered the classical charts.; the publication includes the 74-page libretto, containing photographs from the opera and illustrations from the original book. It was recorded at Abbey Road Studios.

== Reception ==
Charles Ward of the Houston Chronicle termed the production "unfailingly attractive—simple, communicative, touching" with the production "tantalizingly close to a major operatic success". Bernard Holland of the New York Times wrote, "Charming as Maria Bjornson's sets and costumes are and as nicely handled as Francesca Zambello's direction is, they depend on Nicholas Wright's inventive rhyming to give them life. Lighting (by Rick Fisher) becomes as important as Rachel Portman's music. It is hard to say whose opera this is; it is perhaps collective: modest parts exceeded by their sum." T. J. Medrek of the Boston Herald found the musical setting of the opera "full of warmth, wisdom and generous lyric beauty. But the production by director Francesca Zambello and designer Maria Bjornson is so thoroughly enchanting that, given the choice, there's no question that you should opt for the DVD version."
