= Li Jihong =

Li Jihong (李继宏, born 1980) is a Chinese poet, literary translator and critic. He is known for his literary translations, which includes the Chinese editions of The Kite Runner, Conversations with God, A Thousand Splendid Suns, The Fall of Public Man and many others.

He is the director of a new animation movie of The Little Prince, which is in development by El Pajaro Pictures in Shanghai.

== Biography ==
Li started learning English at 12, but studied it "just to get by on my exams", and in 1995 he "spent 8 Chinese yuan to buy a pirated copy of The Bridges of Madison County in a bookstore in Chaozhou City. This novel changed my attitude towards English."

After his graduation from Department of Sociology, Sun Yat-Sen University with a B.A. in 2003, Li joined Oriental Morning Post in Shanghai as a reporter. In the next year, he was assigned to interview and translate for the Chinese edition of Travel and Leisure. He published his first rendered work, the Chinese version of The Birth of Venus (novel) (维纳斯的诞生) by Sarah Dunant in 2005 and has become a full-time literary translator since 2007.

Li is also a regular contributor to Shanghai Review of Books under the pen name of Chen Yibai (陈一白).

In 2013, Li launched his translations of The Great Gatsby, The Old Man and the Sea, Animal Farm and Le Petit Prince, and announced that he would render a whole series of classics in English and French literature in future. He is the first literary translator who tries to introduce so many classics single-handedly in China. It was reported that the first five works of his translations in this series became bestsellers. His translation of Le Petit Prince has sold over six million copies.

== Works ==
Criticism

Stranger Shores, 陌生的彼岸，2012.

Translations

1、The Birth of Venus (novel) by Sarah Dunant, 维纳斯的诞生, 2005.

2、The Kite Runner by Khaled Hosseini, 追风筝的人, 2006.

3、The Interpretation of Murder by Jed Rubenfeld, 谋杀的解析, 2006.

4、Polar Shift by Clive Cussler, 倒转地极, 2007.

5、In The Company of the Courtesan by Sarah Dunant, 烟花散尽, 2007.

6、The Year of Magical Thinking by Joan Didion, 充满奇想的一年, 2007.

7、A Thousand Splendid Suns by Khaled Hosseini, 灿烂千阳, 2007.

8、The Tent by Margaret Atwood, 帐篷, 2008.

9、The Whitethorn Woods by Maeve Binchy, 山楂林的故事, 2008.

10、The Fall of Public Man by Richard Sennett, 公共人的衰落, 2008.

11、La Caverna de las Ideas by Jose Carlos Somoza, 洞穴, 2009 .

12、Conversations with God (Book One) by Neale Donald Walsch, 与神对话·第1卷, 2009.

13、The Culture of the New Capitalism by Richard Sennett, 新资本主义的文化, 2010.

14、The Poor Charlie’s Almanack, by Peter Kaufman and Charles Munger, 穷查理宝典, 2010 .

15、Conversations with God (Book Two) by Neale Donald Walsch, 与神对话·第2卷, 2010.

16、Conversations with God (Book Three) by Neale Donald Walsch, 与神对话·第3卷, 2011.

17、Friendship with God by Neale Donald Walsch, 与神为友, 2012.

18、The Great Gatsby by F. Scott Fitzgerald,了不起的盖茨比, 2013.

19、The Old Man and the Sea by Ernest Hemingway, 老人与海, 2013.

20、Animal Farm by George Orwell, 动物农场, 2013.

21、Le Petit Prince by Antoine de Saint-Exupéry, 小王子, 2013.

22、Walden By Henry David Thoreau, 瓦尔登湖, 2013.

23、Craftsman by Richard Sennet，匠人，2015.

24、The Moon and Sixpence by W. Somerset Maugham, 月亮和六便士，2016.

25、Pride and Prejudice by Jane Austen，傲慢与偏见，2016.

26、The Sound and the Fury by William Faulkner，喧哗与骚动，2018.

27、Communion with God by Neale Donald Walsch，与神合一，2018.

28、Jane Eyre by Charlotte Bronte，简·爱，2019.

29、On the Road by Jack Kerouac，在路上，2022.

30、Together by Richard Sennett，在一起，2025.
