= Lee Carroll =

American channeller, speaker and author

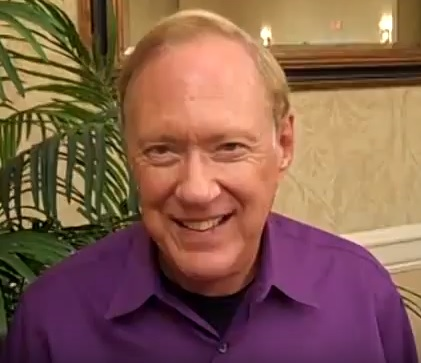
- Lee Carroll in 2013
- Citizenship: United States
- Education: California Western University
- Website: www.kryon.com

Lee Carroll is an American channeller, speaker, and author. Carroll wrote thirteen books on channellings from a teacher called "Kryon of Magnetic Earth", and has co-authored three books on what he terms indigo children, a new generation of children he claims represents an evolution in human consciousness.

== Channelings ==
Originally an economics major who ran a technical audio business for 30 years, Carroll states in his books that he began to channel communication with an entity from "beyond the veil" called "Kryon" in 1989. In his early books Kryon is presented as an entity from the "magnetic service", who is said to be responsible for reconstruction of the magnetic grid of the Earth, the reconstruction of which is necessary in view of the changing spirituality and new evolutionary tasks of humanity. In later books Lee Carroll describes Kryon as an angelic loving entity from the Source (or "Central Sun") who has been with the Earth "since the beginning" and belongs to the same "Family" of the Archangel Michael. The context of using the words "angelic", "archangel" and others is a New Age one, while traditional interpretations of these terms are reevaluated and some connotations are expanded to much metaphilosophical and pan-spiritual meaning. He claims the information he publishes, both printed and online, is intended to help humans "ascend to a higher vibrational level", which, according to his books, is synonymous to overall mental, spiritual and physical evolution.

In his books Carroll provides descriptions of the nature of the channeling process (both his own and that of other channelers, mediums, and clairvoyants), according to which, no channeler is able to convey the received information perfectly, due to bias in individual background and the source being "beyond conventional reality". Carroll says the channeling converted into words or text should not be taken literally, but rather serve as a help to tune one's subtle perception to the original message (which transcends the limits of human perception).

Carroll's Kryon series elaborated a number of popular New Age concepts. Amongst them are co-creating, spiritual contracts, karmic imprints, karmic implants, magnetic layers (strands) of human DNA, karmic groups, synchronicity, ascension, helpers from other star systems etc.

Another topic touched in many of his books is the 2012 transition. According to Lee Carroll, Kryon's message was that the 2012 transition was going to happen on the level of sub-conscious, archetypal energy and open up new avenues to humanity's collective mind.

According to Carroll, Kryon's messages about Earth include, among others, the Earth being a living entity with an individual consciousness, who cooperates with humans. The relationship between the Earth and humans is elaborated based on the "magnetic field" interactions.

Throughout the whole Kryon series, the concept of reincarnation is often discussed. Many of Kryon's "messages" include subtle details of the mechanics of reincarnation, including the value and purpose of human life and death, which are philosophically consonant with the dharmic approaches. The books are written from a Western perspective, however, while Christian and Bible-based spiritual mysticism is present in the wording and expressive style.

His later channelings discuss the Intelligent design premise and directions of future evolution of science and spirituality.

== Coverage in other publications ==
A chapter is dedicated to Lee Carroll and his Kryon channelings in a book by American journalist and film director David Thomas and Matthiew Klinck titled Tuning In: A Journalist, 6 Trance Channelers and Messages from the Other Side. Carroll's Kryon channelings are also discussed in the 2008 documentary Tuning In.

A Spanish journalist, author, and Secretary of the Board of the humanitarian organization Fundación Ananta, Koldo Aldai, discusses Lee Carroll's work and Kryon's messages in his 2004 book Testigos de un nuevo tiempo: Conversaciones con Lee Carroll (Kryon), Miyo, José Argüelles..., where he speaks about the interviews and talks with visionaries, channelers and other representatives of new spiritual ideas of the New Time, as he calls it.

The German yogin and medium Aloka Nama Ba Hal discusses and analyzes Kryon's messages in much detail in his two German books.

Throughout the Kryon series, repeated attention is paid to the role of Jews in evolution of humanity's consciousness. In an interview given in 1999 to the Israeli monthly magazine חיים אחרים (Chaim Acherim -- "Another Life"), Lee Carroll says Kryon's message is that Jews are a special group amongst humans, "a pure karmic group", the chosen people. They supposedly possess inborn particular attributes of consciousness, which are unique to them. That, according to him, is the reason why throughout history those belonging to other nations have often felt sub-conscious envy towards Jews and had tried to exterminate the Jewish people in different ways. In the interview Carroll also speaks of a special role of the land of Israel in the processes which influence the balance of energies (powers) in the world. "What happens with the Jews, that also happens with the world as a whole," Carroll says is one of Kryon's messages.

== Criticism ==
Starting from 2002, some of the French media, like Sud-Ouest, Le Monde de l'éducation, Le Canard enchaîné, Le Nouvel Observateur, M6, and France 2, have presented the activities of Lee Carroll in critical light. In an article in Le Canard Enchaîné, e.g., seeming logical contradictions are shown in the different messages attributed to Kryon by Lee Carroll: "Tout pétri d'amour et de paix qu'il est, Kryeon sait quand même se faire respecter : ainsi il a révélé à Lee Carrol qu'il était déjà intervenu deux fois sur Terre pour procéder à "un ajustement global" : à chaque fois l'humanité s'est éteinte et seuls quelques spécimens ont survécu pour assurer la continuité de l'espèce." Other publications criticize the EMF balancing technique merchandised by associates of Kryon movement, as well as the ideas expressed about the new generation of children, called indigo children.

In The Skeptic's Dictionary, Robert Todd Carroll mentions in an ironic way the Universal Calibration Lattice and EMF Balancing technique popularized by Kryon followers and presented in Lee Carroll's books, as well as critically discusses some of the indigo children ideas evolved in Lee Carroll's works.

The Kryon movement, Lee Carroll, and his books have been mentioned in several published official notes by CIAOSN ("Centre d'information et d'avis sur les organisations sectaires nuisibles", translated into English as "Centre for Information and Advice on Harmful Sectarian Organizations"), which was created following the recommendation of the Royal Commission (House of Representatives, session 1996-1997) of Belgium.

== Bibliography ==
=== Kryon Series ===
1. The End Times: New Information for Personal Peace (1993), 172 pages, ISBN 978-0-9636304-2-1
2. Don't Think Like a Human: Channelled Answers to Basic Questions (1994), 288 pages, ISBN 978-0-9636304-0-7
3. Alchemy of The Human Spirit: A Guide To Human Transition into the New Age (1995), 376 pages, ISBN 978-0-9636304-8-3
4. The Parables of Kryon (1996), 141 pages, ISBN 978-1-56170-663-1
5. The Journey Home: A Kryon Parable, The Story of Michael Thomas and the Seven Angels (1998), 256 pages, ISBN 978-1-56170-552-8
6. Partnering With God: Practical Information for the New Millennium (1997), 400 pages, ISBN 978-1-888053-10-4
7. Letters from Home: Loving Messages from the Family (1999), 456 pages, ISBN 978-1-888053-12-8
8. Passing the Marker: Understanding the New Millennium Energy (2000), 424 pages, ISBN 978-1-888053-11-1
9. The New Beginning: 2002 and Beyond (2002), 384 pages, ISBN 978-1-888053-09-8
10. A New Dispensation: Plain Talk For Confusing Times (2004), 408 pages, ISBN 978-1-888053-14-2
11. Lifting The Veil: The New Energy Apocalypse (2007), 384 pages, ISBN 978-1-888053-19-7
12. The Twelve Layers of DNA (2010), 336 pages, ISBN 978-1-933465-05-0
13. The Recalibration of Humanity (2013 and Beyond), 264 pages, ISBN 1-888053-22-4
14. The New Human (The Evolution of Humanity)(2017), 246 pages, ISBN 978-1-88805320-3

=== Indigo children series ===
- The Indigo Children: The New Kids Have Arrived (with Jan Tober) (1999) Hay House. ISBN 978-1-56170-608-2
- Indigo Celebration: More Messages, Stories, and Insights from the Indigo Children (with Jan Tober) (2001) Hay House. ISBN 978-1-56170-859-8
- The Indigo Children Ten Years Later: What's Happening with the Indigo Teenagers! (with Jan Tober) (2009) Hay House. ISBN 978-1-4019-2317-4

=== Other co-authored books ===
- Great Shift: The Co-Creating a New World for 2012 and Beyond (with Tom Kenyon, Patricia Cori, and Martine Vallée) (2009) Weiser Books. ISBN 978-1-57863-457-6
