= The Little Prince =

1943 novella by Antoine de Saint-Exupéry

- First edition cover
- Author: Antoine de Saint-Exupéry
- Original title: Le Petit Prince
- Translator: (English editions): Katherine Woods; T.V.F. Cuffe; Michael Morpurgo; Irene Testot-Ferry; Alan Wakeman; Janet Hill; David Wilkinson; Gregory Norminton
- Illustrator: Antoine de Saint-Exupéry
- Cover artist: Antoine de Saint-Exupéry
- Language: French
- Genre: Science fantasy
- Publisher: Reynal & Hitchcock (U.S.); Gallimard (France)
- Publication date: April 1943 (U.S.: English & French); 1945 (France: French) (Note: Note that although Saint-Exupéry's regular French publisher, Gallimard, lists Le Petit Prince as being published in 1946, that is apparently a legalistic interpretation possibly designed to allow for an extra year of the novella's copyright protection period, and is based on Gallimard's explanation that the book was only 'sold' starting in 1946. Other sources, such as LePetitPrince.com, record the first Librairie Gallimard printing of 12,250 copies as occurring on 30 November 1945.)
- Publication place: France
- Awards: Le Monde's 100 Books of the Century
- Preceded by: Pilote de guerre (1942)
- Followed by: Lettre à un otage (1944)

The Little Prince (French: Le Petit Prince, pronounced [lə p(ə)ti pʁãs]) is a novella written and illustrated by French writer and aviator Antoine de Saint-Exupéry. It was first published in English and French in the United States by Reynal & Hitchcock in April 1943 and was published posthumously in France following liberation; Saint-Exupéry's works had been banned by the Vichy Regime. The story follows a young prince who visits various planets, including Earth, and addresses themes of loneliness, friendship, love, and loss. Despite its style as a children's book, The Little Prince makes observations about life, adults, and human nature.

The Little Prince became Saint-Exupéry's most successful work, selling an estimated 200 million copies worldwide, which makes it one of the best-selling in history. (Note: The Antoine de Saint-Exupéry Foundation estimated in 2013 that an additional 80 million copies of the story in audio-video formats had been sold worldwide.) By November 2024, the book had been translated into 600 different languages and dialects worldwide. It became the second most translated work ever published, trailing only the Bible. The Little Prince has been adapted to numerous art forms and media, including audio recordings, radio plays, live stage, film, television, ballet, and opera.

== Plot ==
The book begins with the narrator reflecting back on the first drawing he made as a six-year-old of a boa constrictor who had eaten an elephant. Upon showing the picture to grown-ups, he was prompted to create his second drawing of the inside of the boa constrictor to prove the first drawing was not a hat. At this point, he was advised by the grown-up to put away his drawings and pursue something practical. As an adult, he kept his first drawing with him and showed it to new acquaintances to determine if the grown-up was as enlightened as a child. But the adults always reply that the picture was of a hat, so he learns to only talk of "reasonable" things to them, rather than the fanciful.

The narrator becomes an aircraft pilot, and one day, his plane crashes in the Sahara desert, far from civilization. The narrator must fix his airplane before his supply of water runs out. Here, he is greeted by a young boy who is named "the little prince."

The prince asks the narrator to draw a sheep. The narrator first shows him the picture of the elephant inside the snake, which, to the narrator's surprise, the prince interprets correctly. After three failed attempts at drawing a sheep, the frustrated narrator draws a crate, claiming the sheep is inside. Surprisingly, this drawing delights the little prince.

Over the course of days, while the narrator attempts to repair his plane, the prince recounts his life story. He used to live on a house-sized asteroid known on Earth as "B-612". The narrator recounts a story of a Turkish astronomer who, after discovering asteroid B-612, gave a presentation on his findings, but was ignored due to his traditional Turkish clothing. After dressing in European garments, however, namely a suit, his discoveries were accepted. The asteroid has three minuscule volcanoes (two active, and one dormant or extinct) and various plants.

The prince used to clean the volcanoes and weed unwanted seeds and sprigs that infested his soil, pulling out baobab trees that were constantly on the verge of overrunning the surface due to their size. The prince wants a sheep to eat the undesirable plants, but worries it will also eat plants with thorns.

The prince then describes a rose that grew on his asteroid. The rose exaggerated ailments and coughed to have the prince care for her. So, the prince made a screen and a glass globe to protect her from the cold and wind, watered her, and kept the caterpillars from eating her.

Despite falling in love with the rose, the prince also began to feel that she was taking advantage of him, and so he resolved to leave the planet to explore the rest of the universe. Upon saying their goodbyes, the rose apologized for failing to show that she loved him. She wished him well and turned down his desire to leave her in the glass globe, saying she would protect herself. The prince laments that he does not understand how to love his rose while being with her.

After leaving his planet, the prince visited six other planets, each of which was inhabited by one adult:

1. A king who claims that everyone is his subject, who only issues orders that can be followed within reason, such as commanding the sun to set, but only at sunset where it can reasonably do so.
2. A conceited man who only wants to be the most admired person on his otherwise uninhabited planet.
3. A tippler who drinks to forget the shame of drinking.
4. A businessman who is blind to the beauty of the stars and instead endlessly counts and catalogs them in order to "own" them all.
5. A lamplighter on a planet so small that a full day lasts only a minute. He wastes his life following orders to extinguish and relight the lamp post every 30 seconds to correspond with his planet's day and night. The Prince, having mentioned earlier that he loves sunsets, notes that he wishes he could have stayed on this planet the most, as the planet was blessed with 1440 sunsets a day.
6. An elderly geographer who knows nothing about his planet because he has never been anywhere or seen any of the things he records, believing instead that his role is to write down what the explorer sees, of which none exist on his planet. He persuades the prince to visit Earth next.

Landing in a desert, the prince believed that Earth was uninhabited. He then met a snake that claimed to have the power to return him to his home, if he ever wished that.

The prince next met a flower, who said that she had only seen a few men in that part of the world, and that they had no roots, letting the wind blow them around and living hard lives. After climbing the highest mountain he had ever seen, the prince hoped to see the whole of Earth, thus finding the people; however, he saw only the desolate landscape. When the prince called out, his echo answered him, which he interpreted as the voice of someone boring who only repeats words.

The prince encountered a row of rosebushes, becoming downcast at having once thought that his rose was unique and thinking she had lied about being unique. He began to feel that he was not a great prince, as his planet contained only three tiny volcanoes and a flower he now thought of as common. He started weeping until a fox came along.

The fox desired to be tamed and taught the prince how to tame him. By being tamed, something goes from being ordinary or commonplace to being special and unique... but "We only understand what we tame."

From the fox, the prince learns that his rose was indeed special because she was the object of the prince's love and time; he had "tamed" her, and now she was more precious than all of the other roses. Upon their departure, the fox says that important things can only be seen with the heart, not the eyes.

The prince then met two people from Earth:

- A railway switchman who described how passengers constantly rushed from one place to another aboard trains, never satisfied with where they were and not knowing what they were after; only the children among them ever bothered to look out the windows.
- A merchant who spoke about his product, a pill that eliminated the need to drink for a week, saving people 53 minutes.

Eight days after the plane crash, the narrator and the prince are dying of thirst. The prince becomes morose and longs to return home and see his flower. Although losing hope, the prince insists that "Somewhere in the desert there is a well," urging the narrator to continue. And at dawn, the narrator finds the well, saving them.

The prince reminds the narrator that his plane must still be fixed, leaving him there until the work is done. Upon successfully repairing the plane and returning to the prince, the narrator finds the prince talking to the snake, discussing his return home and his desire to see his rose again, worrying that she has been left to fend for herself.

The prince bids farewell to the narrator and states that if it looks as though he has died, it is only because his body is too heavy to take with him to his planet. The prince warns the narrator not to watch him leave, as it will upset him. The narrator, realizing what will happen, refuses to leave the prince's side. The prince tells the narrator that he only needs to look at the stars to think of the prince's laughter and that it will seem as if all the stars are laughing. The prince then walks away and allows the snake to bite him, falling down.

The next morning, the narrator cannot find the prince's body. Managing to repair his airplane, he leaves the desert. The narrator ends his story by addressing the reader directly, requesting to be contacted if one ever encounters a boy like the prince.

== Tone and writing style ==
The story of The Little Prince is recalled in a sombre, measured tone by the pilot-narrator, in memory of his small friend, "a memorial to the prince—not just to the prince, but also to the time the prince and the narrator had together." The Little Prince was created when Saint-Exupéry was "an ex-patriate and distraught about what was going on in his country and in the world." According to one analysis, "the story of the Little Prince features a lot of fantastical, unrealistic elements.... You can't ride a flock of birds to another planet... The fantasy of the Little Prince works because the logic of the story is based on the imagination of children, rather than the strict realism of adults."

An exquisite literary perfectionist, akin to the 19th century French poet Stéphane Mallarmé, Saint-Exupéry produced draft pages "covered with fine lines of handwriting, much of it painstakingly crossed out, with one word left standing where there were a hundred words, one sentence substitut[ing] for a page..." He worked "long hours with great concentration" and, according to the author, it was extremely difficult to start his creative writing processes. Biographer Paul Webster wrote of the aviator-author's style: "Behind Saint-Exupéry's quest for perfection was a laborious process of editing and rewriting which reduced original drafts by as much as two-thirds."

Saint-Exupéry frequently wrote at night, usually starting at about 11 p.m. and accompanied by a tray of strong black coffee. In 1942, he related to his American English teacher, Adèle Breaux, that at such a time of night he felt "free" and able to concentrate, "writing for hours without feeling tired or sleepy", until he instantaneously dozed off. He would wake up later, in daylight, still at his desk, with his head on his arms. Saint-Exupéry stated it was the only way he could work, as once he started a writing project it became an obsession.

A native speaker of French, Saint-Exupéry was never able to achieve anything more than haltingly poor English. Adèle Breaux, his young Northport English tutor, to whom he later dedicated a writing ("For Miss Adèle Breaux, who so gently guided me in the mysteries of the English language"), related her experiences with her famous student as Saint-Exupéry in America, 1942–1943: A Memoir, published in 1971.

== Inspirations ==
=== Events and characters ===
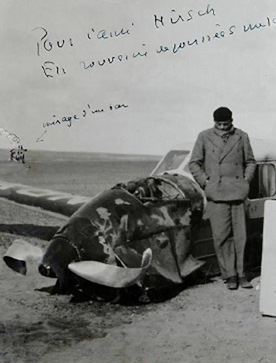
Saint-Exupéry next to his downed Simoun (lacking an all-critical radio) after crashing into the Sahara about 3 am during an air race to Saigon, Vietnam. His survival ordeal was about to begin (Egypt, 1935).

In The Little Prince, its narrator, the pilot, talks of being stranded in the desert beside his crashed aircraft. The account clearly drew on Saint-Exupéry's own experience in the Sahara, an ordeal described in detail in his 1939 memoir Wind, Sand and Stars (original French: Terre des hommes).

On 30 December 1935, at 2.45am, after 19 hours and 44 minutes in the air, Saint-Exupéry, along with his copilot-navigator André Prévot, crashed in the Sahara desert. They were attempting to break the speed record for a Paris-to-Saigon flight in a then-popular type of air race called a raid, that had a prize of 150,000 francs. Their plane was a Caudron C-630 Simoun, (Note: The plane Saint-Exupéry was flying when he crashed at high speed in the Sahara was a Caudron C-630 Simoun, Serial Number 7042, with the French registration F-ANRY ('F' being the international designator for France, and the remainder chosen by the author to represent ANtoine de saint-exupéRY).) and the crash site is thought to have been near to the Wadi Natrun valley, close to the Nile Delta.

Both miraculously survived the crash, only to face rapid dehydration in the intense desert heat. Their maps were primitive and ambiguous. Lost among the sand dunes with a few grapes, a thermos of coffee, a single orange, and some wine, the pair had only one day's worth of liquid. They both began to see vivid hallucinations. By the second and third days, they were so dehydrated that they stopped sweating altogether. Finally, on the fourth day, a Bedouin on a camel discovered them and administered a native rehydration treatment, which saved Saint-Exupéry's and Prévot's lives.

In the novella, the fox, believed to be modelled after the author's intimate New York City friend, Silvia Hamilton Reinhardt, tells the prince that his rose is unique and special, as she is the one he loves. The novella's iconic phrase, "One sees clearly only with the heart" is believed to have been suggested by Reinhardt.

The fearsome, grasping baobab trees, researchers have contended, were meant to represent Nazism attempting to destroy the planet. The little prince's reassurance to the pilot that the prince's body is only an empty shell resembles the last words of Antoine's dying younger brother François, who told the author, from his deathbed: "Don't worry. I'm all right. I can't help it. It's my body".

=== Rose ===
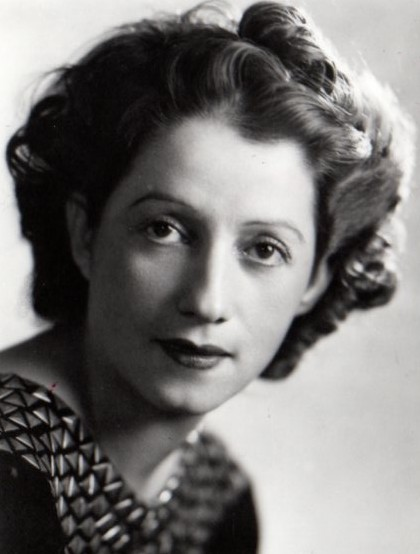
The Rose in The Little Prince was likely inspired by Saint-Exupéry's Salvadoran wife, Consuelo (Montreal, 1942)

Many researchers believe that the prince's kindhearted, but petulant and vain, Rose was inspired by Saint-Exupéry's Salvadoran wife Consuelo de Saint-Exupéry, with the small home planet being inspired by El Salvador where he crashed and stayed to recover while being within view of 3 volcanoes, one of which was Ilamatepec, also known as The Santa Ana Volcano. Despite a tumultuous marriage, Saint-Exupéry kept Consuelo close to his heart and portrayed her as the prince's rose, whom he tenderly protects with a wind screen and places under a glass dome on his tiny planet. Saint-Exupéry's infidelity and the doubts of his marriage are symbolized by the vast field of roses the prince encounters during his visit to Earth.

This interpretation was described by biographer Paul Webster who stated she was "the muse to whom Saint-Exupéry poured out his soul in copious letters ... Consuelo was the rose in The Little Prince. "I should have judged her by her acts and not by her words", says the prince. "She wrapped herself around me and enlightened me. I should never have fled. I should have guessed at the tenderness behind her poor ruses."

=== Prince ===
Saint-Exupéry probably has drawn inspiration for the prince's character and appearance from his own self as a youth, as during his early years friends and family called him le Roi-Soleil ("the Sun King") because of his golden curly hair. The author had also met a precocious eight-year-old with curly blond hair while he was residing with a family in Quebec City in 1942, Thomas De Koninck, the son of philosopher Charles De Koninck. Another possible inspiration for the little prince has been suggested as Land Morrow Lindbergh, the young, golden-haired son of fellow aviator Charles Lindbergh and his wife, Anne Morrow Lindbergh, whom he met during an overnight stay at their Long Island home in 1939. (Note: According to Hoffman, "Anne Morrow Lindbergh's fascination with Saint-Ex was transparent in all she wrote about him, as might be expected when one aviator-writer romantic is writing about another." Saint-Exupéry visited with Anne for two days but spoke with Charles Lindbergh, who arrived home late, for an hour. Besides their vast differences on how Adolf Hitler and the European conflict should be treated, Charles did not speak French, and Saint-Exupéry did not speak English well. Their discussions, passed through Anne's meager French, were somewhat muted. However, the excited conversation between Antoine and Anne soon blossomed "like monster flowers", with each finishing the other's sentences. Ironically, while Saint-Exupéry would later campaign for an early US entry into the war, Lindbergh strongly opposed American involvement in the European war and wanted an arrangement with Hitler, like Stalin's. The meeting between the two future P-38 war pilots was termed "less than a rousing success". Moreover, Charles later became unhappy about his wife's vast esteem for the French adventurer.")

Some have seen the prince as a Christ figure, as the child is sin-free and "believes in a life after death", subsequently returning to his personal heaven. When Life photojournalist John Phillips questioned the author-aviator on his inspiration for the child character, Saint-Exupéry told him that one day he looked down on what he thought was a blank sheet and saw a small childlike figure: "I asked him who he was", he replied. "I'm the Little Prince" was the reply.

One of Saint-Exupéry's earliest literary references to a small prince is to be found in his second news dispatch from Moscow, dated 14 May 1935. In his writings as a special correspondent for Paris-Soir, the author described traveling from France to the Soviet Union by train. Late at night, during the trip, he ventured from his first-class accommodation into the third-class carriages, where he came upon large groups of Polish families huddled together, returning to their homeland. His commentary not only described a diminutive prince but also touched on several other themes Saint-Exupéry incorporated into various philosophical writings:

I sat down [facing a sleeping] couple. Between the man and the woman a child had hollowed himself out a place and fallen asleep. He turned in his slumber, and in the dim lamplight I saw his face. What an adorable face! A golden fruit had been born of these two peasants..... This is a musician's face, I told myself. This is the child Mozart. This is a life full of beautiful promise. Little princes in legends are not different from this. Protected, sheltered, cultivated, what could not this child become? When by mutation a new rose is born in a garden, all gardeners rejoice. They isolate the rose, tend it, foster it. But there is no gardener for men. This little Mozart will be shaped like the rest by the common stamping machine.... This little Mozart is condemned.

— A Sense of Life: En Route to the U.S.S.R.

== Background ==
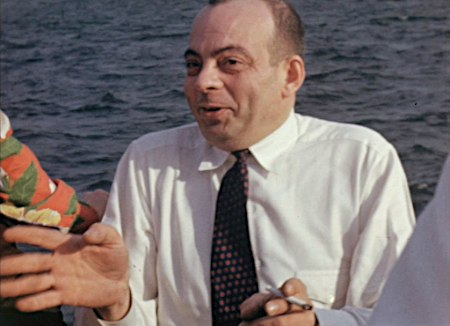
The writer-aviator on Lac Saint-Louis during a speaking tour in support of France after its armistice with Germany. He started his work on the novella shortly after returning to the United States (Quebec, 1942).

Upon the outbreak of the Second World War, a laureate of several of France's highest literary awards and a successful pioneering aviator prior to the war, Saint-Exupéry initially flew with a reconnaissance squadron as a reserve military pilot in the Armée de l'Air (French Air Force). After France's defeat in 1940 and its armistice with Germany, he and Consuelo fled Occupied France and sojourned in North America, with Saint-Exupéry first arriving by himself at the very end of December 1940. His intention for the visit was to convince the United States to quickly enter the war against Nazi Germany and the Axis forces, and he soon became one of the expatriate voices of the French Resistance. In the midst of personal upheavals and failing health, he produced almost half of the writings for which he would be remembered, including a tender tale of loneliness, friendship, love and loss, in the form of a young prince visiting Earth.

An earlier memoir by the author recounted his aviation experiences in the Sahara, and he is thought to have drawn on the same experiences as plot elements in The Little Prince.

He wrote and illustrated the manuscript during the summer and fall of 1942. Although greeted warmly by French-speaking Americans and by fellow expatriates who had preceded him in New York, his 27-month stay would be marred by health problems and racked with periods of severe stress and marital strife. These included partisan attacks on the author's neutral stance towards supporters of both ardent French Gaullist and Vichy France. Saint-Exupéry's American translator (the author spoke poor English) wrote: "He was restless and unhappy in exile, seeing no way to fight again for his country and refusing to take part in the political quarrels that set Frenchman against Frenchman." However, the period was to be both a "dark but productive time" during which he created three important works.

Between January 1941 and April 1943, the Saint-Exupérys lived in two penthouse apartments on Central Park South, then, at the Delamater-Bevin Mansion in Asharoken, Long Island, and still later, a rented brownstone on Beekman Place, again in New York City.

The couple also stayed in Quebec for five weeks during the late spring of 1942, where they met a precocious eight-year-old boy with blond curly hair, Thomas, the son of philosopher Charles De Koninck, with whom the Saint-Exupérys resided. During an earlier visit to Long Island in August 1939, Saint-Exupéry had also met Land Morrow Lindbergh, the young, golden-haired son of the pioneering American aviator Charles Lindbergh and his wife, Anne Morrow Lindbergh.

After returning to the US from his Quebec speaking tour, Saint-Exupéry was pressed to work on a children's book by Elizabeth Reynal, one of the wives of his US publisher, Reynal & Hitchcock. The French wife of Eugene Reynal had closely observed Saint-Exupéry for several months, and noting his ill health and high stress levels, she suggested to him that working on a children's story would help. (Note: Another source states that it was co-publisher Curtice Hitchcock who viewed the author sketches and doodles at a supper party one evening and then suggested writing a children's book to Saint-Exupéry. An additional likely reason for the publisher's encouragement: P. L. Travers, the author of the popular children's books series on Mary Poppins, was at that time working on her third installment that would be published by a Reynal & Hitchcock competitor in 1943, the same year as The Little Prince. Saint-Exupéry's U.S. publisher pressed him to have a competing children's book on the market for Christmas 1942.) The author wrote and illustrated The Little Prince at various locations in New York City but principally in the Long Island north-shore community of Asharoken in mid-to-late 1942, with the manuscript being completed in October.

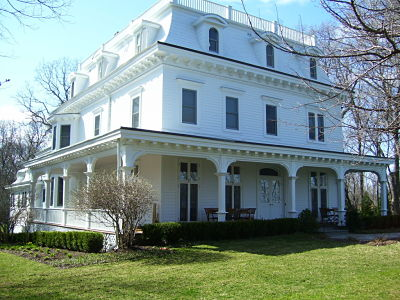
The Bevin House on Long Island, one of the locations in which The Little Prince was written during the summer and fall of 1942.

Although the book was started in his Central Park South penthouse, Saint-Exupéry soon found New York City's noise and sweltering summer heat too uncomfortable to work in and so Consuelo was dispatched to find improved accommodations. After spending some time at an unsuitable clapboard country house in Westport, Connecticut, they found Bevin House, a 22-room mansion in Asharoken that overlooked Long Island Sound. The author-aviator initially complained, "I wanted a hut, and it's the Palace of Versailles." As the weeks wore on, the author became invested in his project and the home would become "a haven for writing, the best place I have ever had anywhere in my life." He devoted himself to the book on mostly midnight shifts, usually starting at about 11 pm, fueled by helpings of scrambled eggs on English muffins, gin and tonics, Coca-Colas, cigarettes and numerous visits by friends and expatriates who dropped in to see their famous countryman. One of the visitors was his wife's Swiss writer paramour Denis de Rougemont, who also modeled for a painting of the Little Prince lying on his stomach, feet and arms extended up in the air. De Rougemont would later help Consuelo write her autobiography, The Tale of the Rose, as well as write his own biography of Saint-Exupéry.

While the author's personal life was frequently chaotic, his creative process while writing was disciplined. Christine Nelson, curator of literary and historical manuscripts at the Morgan Library and Museum which had obtained Saint-Exupéry's original manuscript in 1968, stated: "On the one hand, he had a clear vision for the shape, tone, and message of the story. On the other hand, he was ruthless about chopping out entire passages that just weren't quite right", eventually distilling the 30,000 word manuscript, accompanied by small illustrations and sketches, to approximately half its original length. The story, the curator added, was created when he was "an ex-patriate and distraught about what was going on in his country and in the world."

The large white Second French Empire-style mansion, hidden behind tall trees, afforded the writer a multitude of work environments, but he usually wrote at a large dining table. It also allowed him to alternately work on his writings and then on his sketches and watercolours for hours at a time, moving his armchair and paint easel from the library towards the parlor one room at a time in search of sunlight. His meditative view of sunsets at the Bevin House were incorporated in the book, where the prince visits a small planet with 43 daily sunsets, a planet where all that is needed to watch a sunset "is move your chair a few steps." (Note: Saint-Exupéry was 43 the year the fable was published, and 44 the year he died. He originally wrote the story with 43 sunsets, but posthumous editions often quote '44 sunsets', possibly in tribute.)

=== Manuscript ===
The original 140-page autograph manuscript of The Little Prince, along with various drafts and trial drawings, were acquired from the author's close friend Silvia Hamilton in 1968 by curator Herbert Cahoon of the Pierpont Morgan Library (now The Morgan Library & Museum) in Manhattan, New York City. It is the only known surviving handwritten draft of the complete work. The manuscript's pages include large amounts of the author's prose that was struck-through and therefore not published as part of the first edition. In addition to the manuscript, several watercolour illustrations by the author are also held by the museum. They were not part of the first edition. The institution has marked both the 50th and 70th anniversaries of the novella's publication, along with the centenary celebration of the author's birth, with major exhibitions of Antoine de Saint-Exupéry's literary works. Physically, the manuscript's onion skin media has become brittle and subject to damage. Saint-Exupéry's handwriting is described as being doctor-like, verging on indecipherable.

The story's keynote aphorism, On ne voit bien qu'avec le cœur. L'essentiel est invisible pour les yeux ("One sees clearly only with the heart. What is essential is invisible to the eye") was reworded and rewritten some 15 times before achieving its final phrasing. Saint-Exupéry also used a Dictaphone recorder to produce oral drafts for his typist. His initial 30,000-word working manuscript was distilled to less than half its original size through laborious editing sessions. Multiple versions of its many pages were created and its prose then polished over several drafts, with the author occasionally telephoning friends at 2:00 a.m. to solicit opinions on his newly written passages.

Many pages and illustrations were cut from the finished work as he sought to maintain a sense of ambiguity to the story's theme and messages. Included among the deletions in its 17th chapter were references to locales in New York, such as the Rockefeller Center and Long Island. Other deleted pages described the prince's vegetarian diet and the garden on his home asteroid that included beans, radishes, potatoes and tomatoes, but which lacked fruit trees that might have overwhelmed the prince's planetoid. Deleted chapters discussed visits to other asteroids occupied by a retailer brimming with marketing phrases, and an inventor whose creation could produce any object desired at a touch of its controls. Likely the result of the ongoing war in Europe weighing on Saint-Exupéry's shoulders, the author produced a sombre three-page epilogue lamenting "On one star someone has lost a friend, on another someone is ill, on another someone is at war...", with the story's pilot-narrator noting of The Prince: "he sees all that. . . . For him, the night is hopeless. And for me, his friend, the night is also hopeless." The draft epilogue was also omitted from the novella's printing.

In April 2012 a Parisian auction house announced the discovery of two previously unknown draft manuscript pages that included new text. In the newly discovered material the Prince meets his first Earthling after his arrival. The person he meets is an "ambassador of the human spirit". The ambassador is too busy to talk, saying he is searching for a missing six letter word: "I am looking for a six-letter word that starts with G that means 'gargling' ", he says. Saint-Exupéry's text does not say what the word is, but experts believe it could be "guerre" (or "war"). The novella thus takes a more politicized tack with an anti-war sentiment, as 'to gargle' in French is an informal reference to 'honour', which the author may have viewed as a key factor in military confrontations between nations.

=== Dedication ===
Saint-Exupéry met Léon Werth (1878–1955), a writer and art critic, in 1931. Werth soon became Saint-Exupery's closest friend outside of his Aeropostale associates. Werth was an anarchist, a leftist Bolshevik supporter of Jewish descent, twenty-two years older than Saint-Exupéry.

Saint-Exupéry dedicated two books to him, Lettre à un otage (Letter to a Hostage) and Le Petit Prince (The Little Prince), and referred to Werth in three more of his works. At the beginning of the Second World War while writing The Little Prince, Saint-Exupéry lived in his downtown New York City apartment, thinking of his native France and his friends. Werth spent the war unobtrusively in Saint-Amour, his village in the Jura, a mountainous region near Switzerland where he was "alone, cold and hungry", a place that had few polite words for French refugees. Werth appears in the preamble to the novella, where Saint-Exupéry dedicates the book to him:

To Leon Werth

I ask children to forgive me for dedicating this book to a grown-up. I have a serious excuse: this grown-up is the best friend I have in the world. I have another excuse: this grown-up can understand everything, even books for children. I have a third excuse: he lives in France where he is hungry and cold. He needs to be comforted. If all these excuses are not enough then I want to dedicate this book to the child whom this grown-up once was. All grown-ups were children first. (But few of them remember it.) So I correct my dedication:

To Leon Werth,

When he was a little boy

Saint-Exupéry's aircraft disappeared over the Mediterranean in July 1944. The following month, Werth learned of his friend's disappearance from a radio broadcast. Without having yet heard of The Little Prince, in November, Werth discovered that Saint-Exupéry had published a fable the previous year in the U.S., which he had illustrated himself, and that it was dedicated to him. At the end of the Second World War, which Antoine de Saint-Exupéry did not live to see, Werth said: "Peace, without Tonio (Saint-Exupéry) isn't entirely peace." Werth did not see the text for which he was so responsible until five months after his friend's death, when Saint-Exupéry's French publisher, Gallimard, sent him a special edition. Werth died in Paris in 1955.

=== Illustrations ===
All of the novella's simple but elegant watercolour illustrations, which were integral to the story, were painted by Saint-Exupéry. He had studied architecture as a young adult but nevertheless could not be considered an artist – which he self-mockingly alluded to in the novella's introduction. Several of his illustrations were painted on the wrong side of the delicate onion skin paper that he used as his medium of choice. As with some of his draft manuscripts, he occasionally gave away preliminary sketches to close friends and colleagues; others were even recovered as crumpled balls from the floors in the cockpits he flew. (Note: On one of Saint-Exupéry's flights his aircraft engine started failing. His aircraft mechanic onboard later recalled that Saint-Exupéry was completely calm, "Saint-Ex simply started doodling cartoons which he handed back to me with a big grin.") Two or three original Little Prince drawings were reported in the collections of New York artist, sculptor and experimental filmmaker Joseph Cornell. One rare original Little Prince watercolour would be mysteriously sold at a second-hand book fair in Japan in 1994, and subsequently authenticated in 2007.

An unrepentant lifelong doodler and sketcher, Saint-Exupéry had for many years sketched little people on his napkins, tablecloths, letters to paramours and friends, lined notebooks and other scraps of paper. Early figures took on a multitude of appearances, engaged in a variety of tasks. Some appeared as doll-like figures, baby puffins, angels with wings, and even a figure similar to that in Robert Crumb's Keep On Truckin' of 1968. In a 1940 letter to a friend, he sketched a character with his own thinning hair, sporting a bow tie, viewed as a boyish alter-ego, and he later gave a similar doodle to Elizabeth Reynal at his New York publisher's office. Most often the diminutive figure was expressed as "...a slip of a boy with a turned up nose, lots of hair, long baggy pants that were too short for him and with a long scarf that whipped in the wind. Usually the boy had a puzzled expression... [T]his boy Saint-Exupéry came to think of as "the little prince", and he was usually found standing on top of a tiny planet. Most of the time he was alone, sometimes walking up a path. Sometimes there was a single flower on the planet." His characters were frequently seen chasing butterflies; when asked why they did so, Saint-Exupéry, who thought of the figures as his alter-egos, replied that they were actually pursuing a "realistic ideal". Saint-Exupéry eventually settled on the image of the young, precocious child with curly blond hair, an image which would become the subject of speculations as to its source. One "most striking" illustration depicted the pilot-narrator asleep beside his stranded plane prior to the prince's arrival. Although images of the narrator were created for the story, none survived Saint-Exupéry's editing process.

To mark both the 50th and 70th anniversaries of The Little Prince's publication, the Morgan Library and Museum mounted major exhibitions of Saint-Exupéry's draft manuscript, preparatory drawings, and similar materials that it had obtained earlier from a variety of sources. One major source was an intimate friend of his in New York City, Silvia Hamilton (later, Reinhardt), to whom the author gave his working manuscript just prior to returning to Algiers to resume his work as a Free French Air Force pilot. Hamilton's black poodle, Mocha, is believed to have been the model for the Little Prince's sheep, with a Raggedy Ann type doll helping as a stand-in for the prince. Additionally, a pet boxer, Hannibal, that Hamilton gave to him as a gift may have been the model for the story's desert fox and its tiger. A museum representative stated that the novella's final drawings were lost.

Seven unpublished drawings for the book were also displayed at the museum's exhibit, including fearsome looking baobab trees ready to destroy the prince's home asteroid, as well as a picture of the story's narrator, the forlorn pilot, sleeping next to his aircraft. That image was likely omitted to avoid giving the story a 'literalness' that would distract its readers, according to one of the Morgan Library's staff. According to Christine Nelson, curator of literary and historical manuscripts at the Morgan, "[t]he image evokes Saint-Exupéry's own experience of awakening in an isolated, mysterious place. You can almost imagine him wandering without much food and water and conjuring up the character of the Little Prince." Another reviewer noted that the author "chose the best illustrations... to maintain the ethereal tone he wanted his story to exude. Choosing between ambiguity and literal text and illustrations, Saint-Exupéry chose in every case to obfuscate." Not a single drawing of the story's narrator–pilot survived the author's editing process; "he was very good at excising what was not essential to his story".

In 2001 Japanese researcher Yoshitsugu Kunugiyama surmised that the cover illustration Saint-Exupéry painted for Le Petit Prince deliberately depicted a stellar arrangement created to celebrate the author's own centennial of birth. According to Kunugiyama, the cover art chosen from one of Saint-Exupéry's watercolour illustrations contained the planets Saturn and Jupiter, plus the star Aldebaran, arranged as an isosceles triangle, a celestial configuration which occurred in the early 1940s, and which he likely knew would next reoccur in the year 2000. Saint-Exupéry possessed superior mathematical skills and was a master celestial navigator, a vocation he had studied at Salon-de-Provence with the Armée de l'Air (French Air Force).

=== Post-publication ===
Stacy Schiff, one of Saint-Exupéry's principal biographers, wrote of him and his most famous work, "rarely have an author and a character been so intimately bound together as Antoine de Saint-Exupéry and his Little Prince", and remarking of their dual fates, "the two remain tangled together, twin innocents who fell from the sky". She noted that the novella's mystique was "enhanced by the parallel between author and subject: imperious innocents whose lives consist of equal parts flight and failed love, who fall to earth, are little impressed with what they find here and ultimately disappear without a trace."

Weeks after his novella was first published in April 1943, Saint-Exupéry joined the Free French Forces as a pilot. He was part of a 32-ship military convoy that voyaged to North Africa, where he rejoined his old squadron to fight with the Allies, resuming his work as a reconnaissance pilot despite the efforts of his friends, colleagues and fellow airmen to dissuade him. (Note: Following one of his crashes in a sophisticated single-pilot spy aircraft that resulted in him being grounded, Saint-Exupéry spared no effort in his campaign to return to active combat flying duty. He utilized all his contacts and powers of persuasion to overcome his age and physical handicap barriers, which would have completely barred an ordinary patriot from serving as a war pilot. Instrumental in his reinstatement was an agreement he proposed to John Phillips, a fluently bilingual Life Magazine correspondent in February 1944, where Saint-Exupéry committed to "write, and I'll donate what I do to you, for your publication, if you get me reinstated into my squadron." Phillips later met with a high-level U.S. Army Air Forces press officer in Italy, Colonel John Reagan McCrary, who conveyed the Life Magazine request to General Eaker. Eaker's approval for Saint-Exupéry's return to flying status would be made "not through favoritism, but through exception." The brutalized French, it was noted, would cut a German's throat "probably with more relish than anybody.") After numerous narrow escapes, the pilot was finally lost in action during a July 1944 reconnaissance mission from Corsica to the continent in preparation for the Allied invasion of occupied France, only three weeks before the Liberation of Paris. He was 44 years old when he disappeared. (Note: Various sources state that his final flight was either his seventh, eight, ninth, or even his tenth covert reconnaissance mission. He volunteered for almost every such proposed mission submitted to his squadron, and protested fiercely after being grounded following his second sortie which ended with a demolished P-38. His connections in high places, plus a publishing agreement with Life Magazine, were instrumental in having the grounding order against him lifted. For some time Saint-Exupéry's friends, colleagues, and compatriots were actively working to keep the aging, accident-prone author grounded, out of harm's way.)

=== Reception ===
Many of the book's initial reviewers were flummoxed by the fable's multi-layered story line and its morals, perhaps expecting a significantly more conventional story from one of France's leading writers. Its publisher had anticipated such reactions to a work that fell neither exclusively into a children's nor adults' literature classification. The New York Times reviewer wrote shortly before its publication "What makes a good children's book? ... The Little Prince, which is a fascinating fable for grown-ups [is] of conjectural value for boys and girls of 6, 8 and 10. [It] may very well be a book on the order of Gulliver's Travels, something that exists on two levels"; "Can you clutter up a narrative with paradox and irony and still hold the interest of 8 and 10-year olds?" Notwithstanding the story's duality, the review added that major portions of the story would probably still "capture the imagination of any child." Addressing whether it was written for children or adults, Reynal & Hitchcock promoted it ambiguously, saying that as far as they were concerned "it's the new book by Saint-Exupéry", adding to its dustcover "There are few stories which in some way, in some degree, change the world forever for their readers. This is one."

Others were not shy in offering their praise. Austin Stevens, also of The New York Times, stated that the story possessed "...large portions of the Saint-Exupéry philosophy and poetic spirit. In a way it's a sort of credo." P. L. Travers, author of the Mary Poppins series of children books, wrote in a New York Herald Tribune review: "The Little Prince will shine upon children with a sidewise gleam. It will strike them in some place that is not the mind and glow there until the time comes for them to comprehend it."

British journalist Neil Clark, in The American Conservative in 2009, offered an expansive view of Saint-Exupéry's overall work by commenting that it provides a "…bird's eye view of humanity [and] contains some of the most profound observations on the human condition ever written", and that the author's novella "doesn't merely express his contempt for selfishness and materialism [but] shows how life should be lived."

The book enjoyed modest initial success, residing on The New York Times Best Seller list for only two weeks, as opposed to his earlier 1939 English translation, Wind, Sand and Stars which remained on the same list for nearly five months. As a cultural icon, the novella regularly draws new readers and reviewers, selling almost two million copies annually and also spawning numerous adaptations. Modern-day references to The Little Prince include one from The New York Times that describes it as "abstract" and "fabulistic".

== Literary translations and printed editions ==
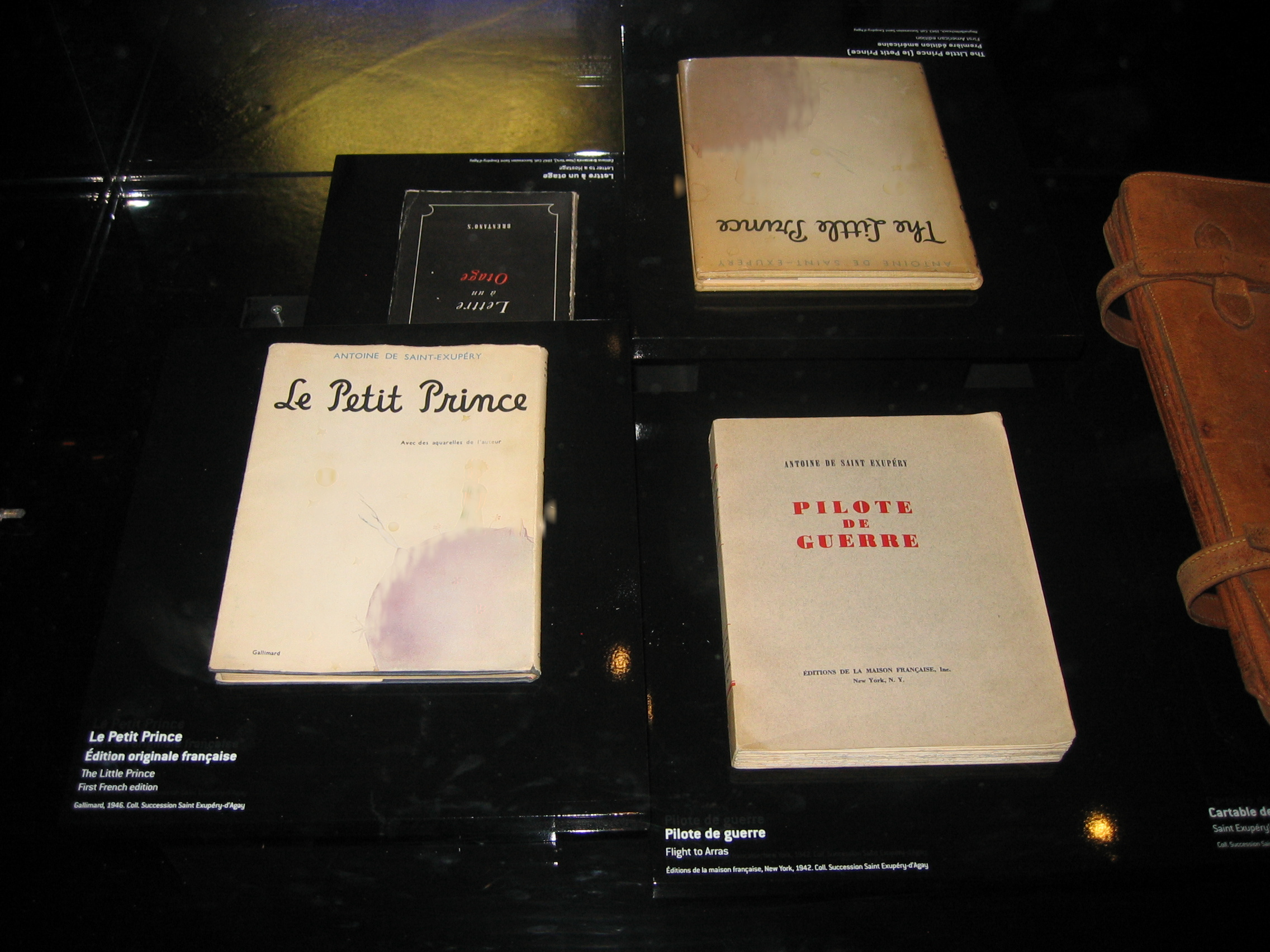
Two editions of The Little Prince (lower left in French and upper right in English, artwork not shown) in the Saint-Exupéry permanent exhibit at the French Air and Space Museum, Le Bourget, Paris (2008)

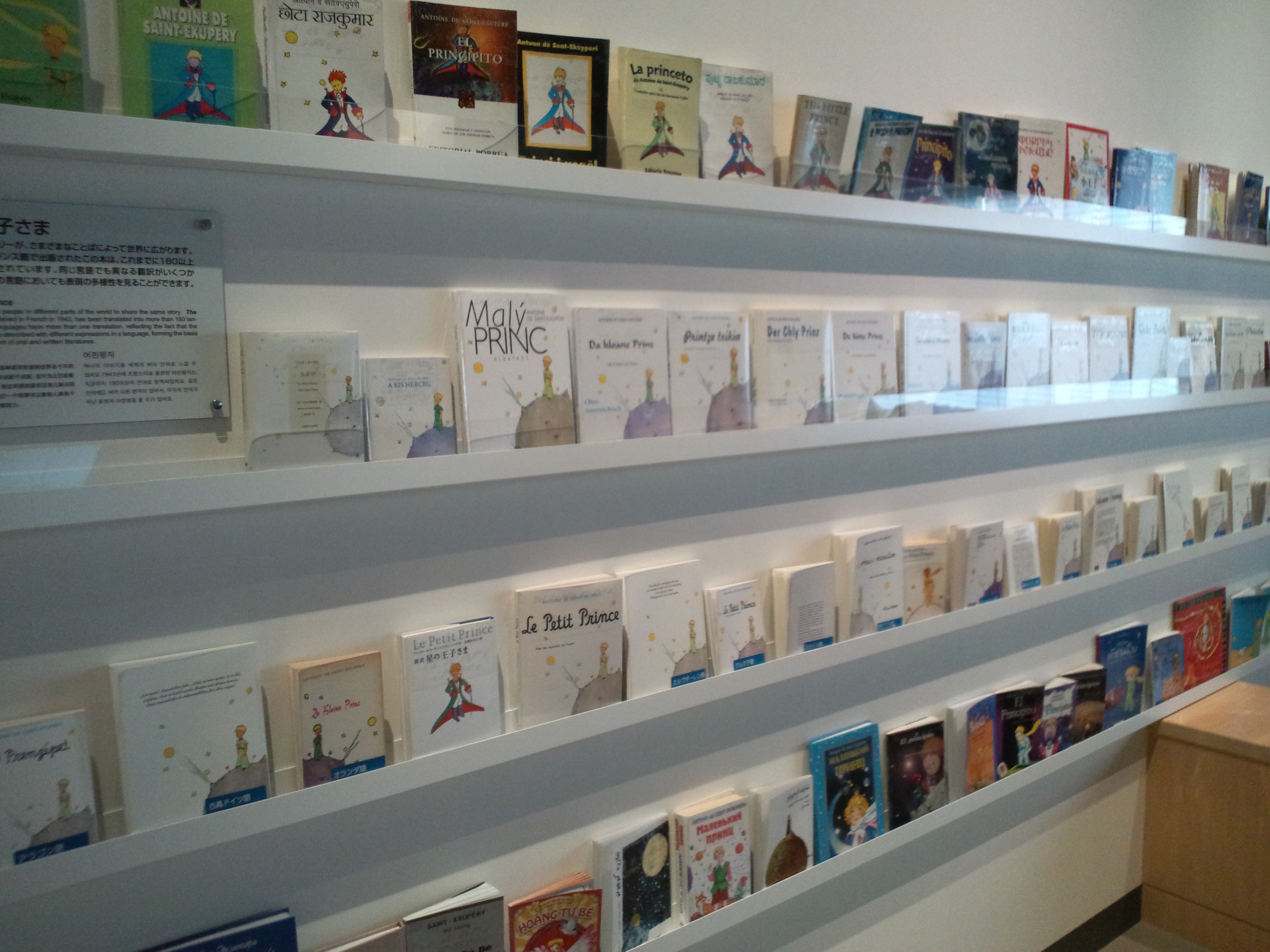
Some of the more than 250 translations of The Little Prince, these editions displayed at the National Museum of Ethnology, Osaka, Japan (2013)

In April 2017, The Little Prince became the world's most translated non-religious book, with translations into 300 languages. This number had risen to 600 by November 2024.

Katherine Woods (1886–1968) produced the first English translation of 1943, which was later joined by several other English translations. Her translation contained some errors. Mistranslations aside, one reviewer noted that Woods's almost "poetic" English translation has long been admired by many Little Prince lovers, who have spanned generations, as her work maintains Saint-Exupéry's story-telling spirit and charm, if not its literal accuracy. As of 2019 at least seven additional English translations have been published:

- Irene Testot-Ferry, (ISBN 0-7567-5189-6, 1st ed. 1995)
- T.V.F. Cuffe, (ISBN 0-14-118562-7, 1st ed. 1995)
- Alan Wakeman, (ISBN 1-86205-066-X, 1st ed. 1995)
- Richard Howard, (ISBN 0-15-204804-9, 1st ed. 2000)
- Ros and Chloe Schwartz, (ISBN 9781907360015, 1st ed. 2010)
- David Wilkinson, (bilingual English-French student edition, ISBN 0-9567215-9-1, 1st ed. 2011)
- Michael Morpurgo, (ISBN 978-1784874179, 1st ed. 2018)
- Guillain Méjane, (translated via the PoesIA project, a convolutional neural network, ISBN 9798621081355, 1st ed. 2020)

The Little Prince was also translated by Bonnie Greer for a BBC radio adaptation in 1999.

- Bonnie Greer, BBC Radio 4, broadcast 25 December 1999.

Each translation approaches the essence of the original with an individual style and focus.

Le Petit Prince is often used as a beginner's book for French-language students, and several bilingual and trilingual translations have been published. As of 2017, it has been translated into more than 300 languages and dialects, including Sardinian, the constructed languages of Esperanto and Klingon, and the Congolese language Alur, as well as being printed in Braille for blind readers. It is also often used as an introduction into endangered varieties with very few speakers like Maya (2001), Aromanian (2006), or Banat Bulgarian (2017). It is one of the few modern books to have been translated into Latin, as Regulus, vel Pueri soli sapiunt in 1961 by Auguste Haury (1910–2002) and as Regulus in 2010 by Alexander Winkler. A translation of the book was published as U'cc priinsâž in Skolt Sámi translated by Skolt Sámi author Kati-Claudia Fofonoff in 2000, a language spoken in Sápmi. At the time, the language was spoken by less than 500 people making it the smallest language with a translation of Le Petit Prince. In 2005, the book was also translated into Toba Qom, an indigenous language of northern Argentina, as So Shiyaxauolec Nta'a. It was the first book translated into that language since the New Testament. It was also translated to a northern Italian dialect, Vogherese. Anthropologist Florence Tola, commenting on the suitability of the work for Toban translation, said there is "nothing strange [when] the Little Prince speaks with a snake or a fox and travels among the stars, it fits perfectly into the Toba mythology".

Linguists have compared the many translations and even editions of the same translation for style, composition, titles, wordings and genealogy. As an example: as of 2011 there are approximately 47 translated editions of The Little Prince in Korean, (Note: In 2009, the director of the Village Petite France (Little France Village) in South Korea stated that there were 350 different editions of Orin Wanja (The Little Prince) in Korean, including editions in Manga.) and there are also about 50 different translated editions in Chinese (produced in both mainland China and Taiwan). Many of them are titled Prince From a Star, while others carry the book title that is a direct translation of The Little Prince. By studying the use of word phrasings, nouns, mistranslations and other content in newer editions, linguists can identify the source material for each version: whether it was derived from the original French typescript, or from its first translation into English by Katherine Woods, or from a number of adapted sources.

The first edition to be published in France, Saint-Exupéry's birthplace, was printed by his regular publisher in that country, Gallimard, only after the German occupation of France ended. (Note: A further complication occurred due to Saint-Exupéry's opinions of French General Charles de Gaulle, whom he held in low regard. Even though both men were working to free France from Nazi occupation, Saint-Exupéry saw de Gaulle with apprehension and consequently provided no public support to the General. In response, de Gaulle struck back at the author by implying that the author was a German supporter, and then had all his literary works banned in France's North African colonies. Saint-Exupéry's writings were, with irony, banned simultaneously in both occupied France and Free France.) Prior to France's liberation new printings of Saint-Exupéry's works were made available only by means of secret print runs, such as that of February 1943 when 1,000 copies of an underground version of his best seller Pilote de guerre, describing the German invasion of France, were covertly printed in Lyon.

Commemorating the novella's 70th anniversary of publication, in conjunction with the 2014 Morgan Exhibition, Éditions Gallimard released a complete facsimile edition of Saint-Exupéry's original handwritten manuscript entitled Le Manuscrit du Petit Prince d'Antoine de Saint-Exupéry: Facsimilé et Transcription, edited by Alban Cerisier and Delphine Lacroix. The book in its final form has also been republished in 70th anniversary editions by Houghton Mifflin Harcourt (in English) and by Gallimard (in French).

A Portuguese translation of the novella in 2007, edited by Eidouro Gráfica e Editora Ltda and presented at the XIII Biannual Book Fair of Rio de Janeiro, Brazil, holds the Guinness World Record for world's largest book published. The impressive tome measures 2.01 m (6 ft 7 in) high and 3.08 m (10 ft 1 in) wide when open, containing 128 pages.

It has been translated into minority languages, such as the Irish language, by Éabhloid publishers in 2015; and the Scots language in 2017 and Shetlandic in 2022, both by Edition Tintenfass.

=== Spanish editions ===
After being translated by Bonifacio del Carril, The Little Prince was first published in Spanish as El principito in September 1951 by the Argentine publisher Emecé Editores. Other Spanish editions have also been created; in 1956 the Mexican publisher Diana released its first edition of the book, El pequeño príncipe, a Spanish translation by José María Francés. Another edition of the work was produced in Spain in 1964 and, four years later, in 1968, editions were also produced in Colombia and Cuba, with translation by Luis Fernández in 1961. Chile had its first translation in 1981; Peru in February 1985; Venezuela in 1986, and Uruguay in 1990. The book is among the few books in the Castilian cant Gacería (as El pitoche engrullón) or the Madrid slang Cheli (as El chaval principeras).

=== Bavarian editions ===
The Little Prince has an adaptation for the inhabitants of Bavaria, Austria and South Tyrol, covering for a large variety of the Bavarian language. The book was adapted by Johannes Limmer and published in 2019. It is called Da gloane Prinz and contains the original pictures of Saint-Exupéry.

=== Chinese editions ===
The Little Prince is one of the most popular and beloved foreign works of literature in China. It is reported that there are more than 70 Chinese translations of the novella. According to the official website of the Succession Antoine de Saint-Exupéry-d'Agay, the version translated by Li Jihong, which was published in January 2013, sold over two million copies in less than four years. Cheng Li-chun published a translation in Taiwan in May 2022.

=== Extension of copyrights in France ===
Due to Saint-Exupéry's wartime death, his estate received the civil code designation Mort pour la France (English: Died for France), which was applied by the French government in 1948. Amongst the law's provisions is an increase of 30 years in the duration of copyright; thus most of Saint-Exupéry's creative works will not fall out of copyright status in France for an extra 30 years.

The book will remain under copyright in the US until 2039 and will remain in copyright in France until 2033 or 2045.

== Adaptations and sequels ==
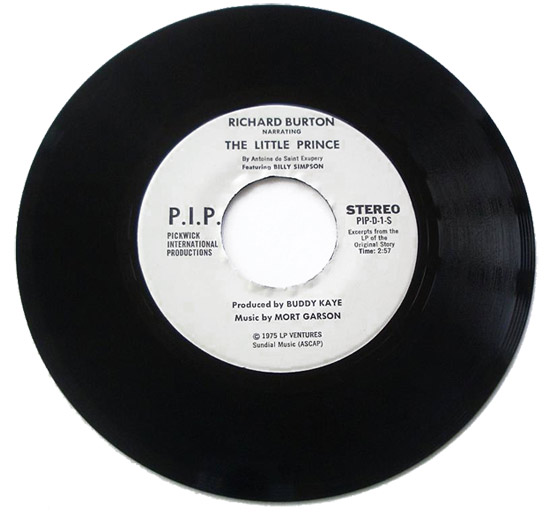
A short 45 RPM demo recording by Richard Burton narrating The Little Prince with music by Mort Garson, excerpted from a longer 33 1/3 RPM vinyl record album. Burton won the Best Children's Album Grammy Award for his narration (1975).

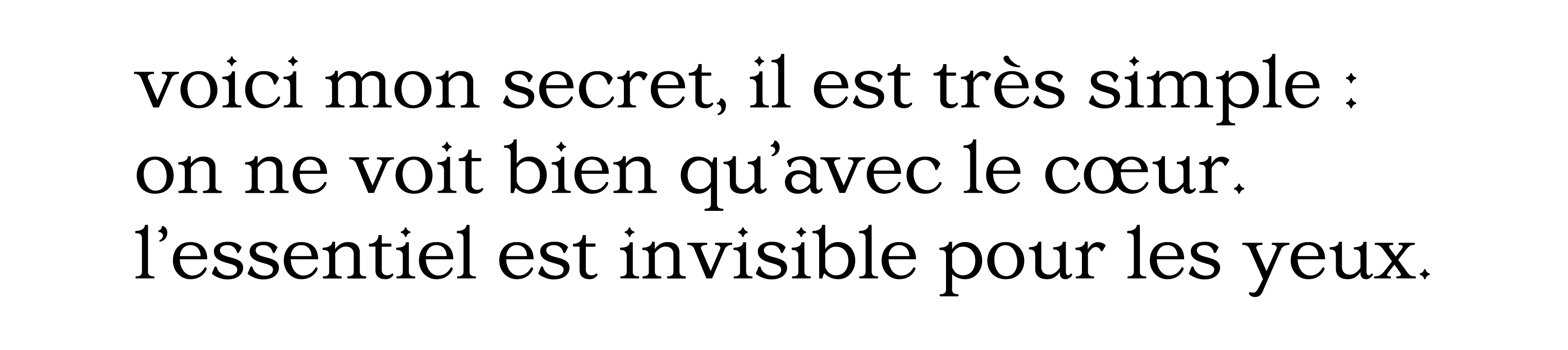
A typeface inspired by The Little Prince designed by Graphic Designer You Lu

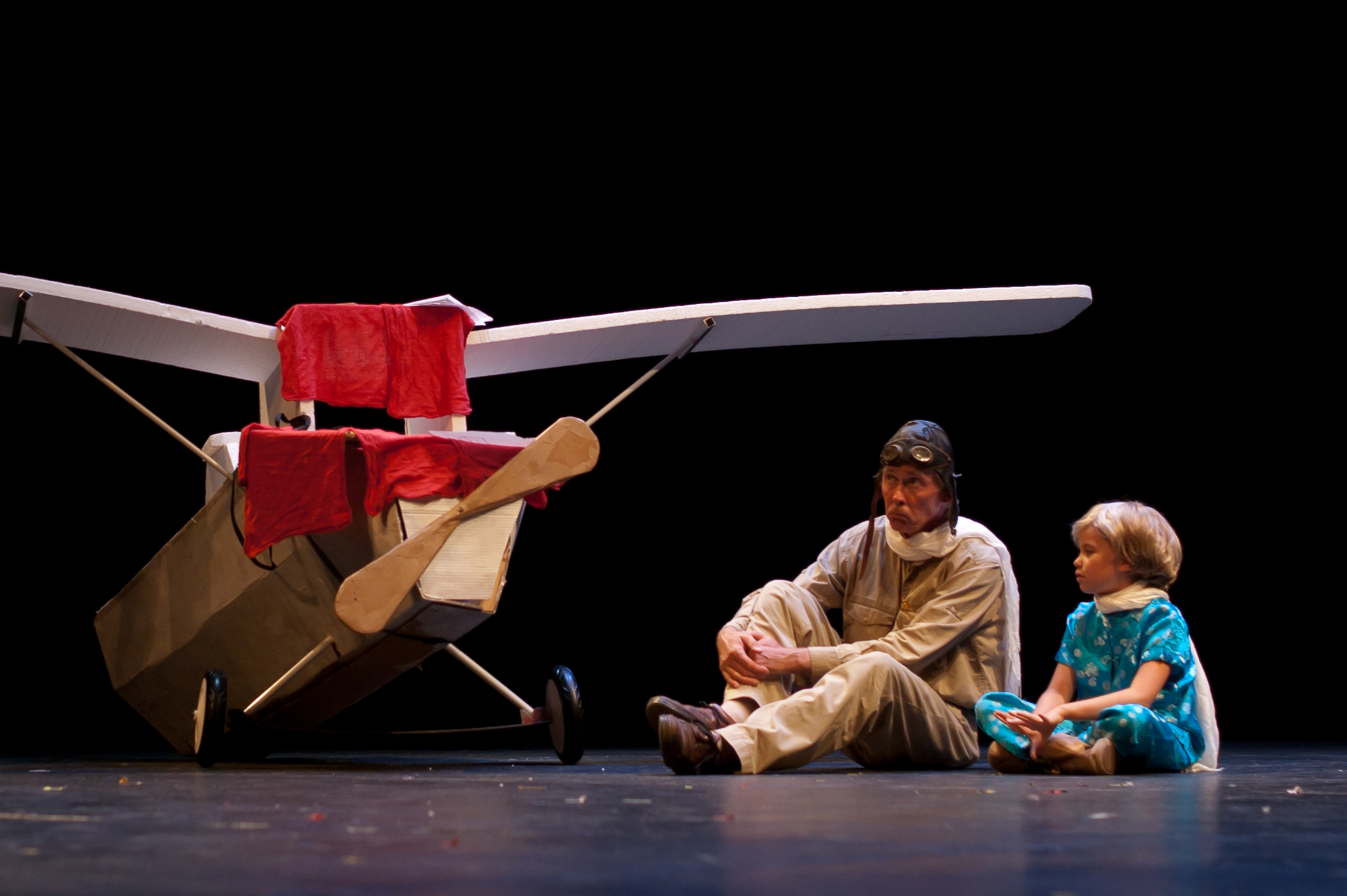
One of numerous stage adaptations of Saint-Exupéry's child and adult fable, this one at the University of Minnesota's Rarig Center Proscenium (2010)

The wide appeal of Saint-Exupéry's novella has led to it being adapted into numerous forms over the decades. Additionally, the title character himself has been adapted in a number of promotional roles, including as a symbol of environmental protection, by the Toshiba Group. He has also been portrayed as a "virtual ambassador" in a campaign against smoking, employed by the Veolia Energy Services Group, and his name was used as an episode title in the TV series Lost.

The multi-layered fable, styled as a children's story with its philosophical elements of irony and paradox directed towards adults, has allowed The Little Prince to be transferred into various other art forms and media, including:

- Vinyl record, cassette and CD: As early as 1954 several audio editions in multiple languages were created on vinyl record, cassette tape and much later as a CD, with one English version narrated by Richard Burton.
- Radio broadcasts: Radio plays were produced in the United States, with Raymond Burr, in 1956, and most recently in the United Kingdom on BBC in a 1999 dramatization by Bonnie Greer, produced by Pam Fraser Solomon.
- Film and TV: The story has been created as a movie as early as 1966 in a Soviet-Lithuanian production, with its first English movie version in 1974 produced in the United States featuring Bob Fosse, who choreographed his own dance sequence as "The Snake", and Gene Wilder as "The Fox". In 1987, a Turkish version was adopted into a direct-to-video film by Remzi Aydın Jöntürk. Starting in 2010, a three-season-long animated series was made that expanded upon the book and was produced by Method Animation. In 2015, a major 3D film, combining computer animation and stop motion animation, was released as The Little Prince in English and Le Petit Prince in French. A 2D-animated spin-off series The Little Prince & Friends was released in 2023 and its produced by the same studio that produce the CGI series Method Animation.
- Stage: The Little Prince's popular appeal has lent itself to widespread dramatic adaptations in live stage productions at both the professional and amateur levels. It has become a staple of numerous stage companies, with dozens of productions created.
- Graphic novel: A new printed version of the story in comic book form, by Joann Sfar in 2008, drew widespread notice.
- Pop-up book: A new printed edition, using the original text (as translated by Richard Howard in 2000) and St. Exupery's original drawings as the basis for elaborate pop-up illustrations, was published by Houghton Mifflin Harcourt (ISBN 978-0-547-26069-3, 1st ed. 2009).
- Opera and ballet: Several operatic and ballet versions of the novella have been produced as early as the Russian Malen'kiy prints by Lev Knipper, first performed in 1978 with a symphony score composed in the 1960s. BalletX performed the world premiere of a full length Little Prince ballet in 2019 in Philadelphia, Pennsylvania, and a revival of it in 2026.
- Concert music: Concert Suite on Le Petit Prince for solo violin, solo harp and chamber orchestra by Jean-Pascal Beintus (premiered by the DSO Berlin with Kent Nagano in 2008)
- Anime: A Japanese animation TV series was made in 1978, Hoshi no Ōjisama: Petit Prince, containing 39 episodes that do not follow the plot of the original novella. Each episode contains an adventure on a planet, usually Earth, where the little prince meets different people each time and makes friends. Some key elements of the original story have been kept. Namely, the little prince's golden hair, his scarf, laughter, his planet name (B-612), the rose and the three volcanoes. The anime had been aired and dubbed into several languages including Arabic, English, French, German, Italian, Polish, Portuguese and Spanish. The English dub's title is The Adventures of the Little Prince.
- Other: a number of musical references, game boards and a video game version of the novella have been released.

In 1997, Jean-Pierre Davidts wrote what could be considered a sequel to The Little Prince, entitled Le petit prince retrouvé (The Little Prince Returns). In this version, the shipwrecked narrator encounters the little prince on a lone island; the prince has returned to seek help against a tiger who threatens his sheep. Another sequel titled The Return of the Little Prince was written by former actress Ysatis de Saint-Simone, niece of Consuelo de Saint-Exupéry.

== Honours and legacy ==
=== Museums and exhibits ===
==== Morgan exhibitions ====
New York City's Morgan Library & Museum mounted three showings of the original manuscript, with its first showing in 1994, on the occasion of the story's 50th anniversary of publication, followed by one celebrating the author's centennial of birth in 2000, with its last and largest exhibition in 2014 honouring the novella's 70th anniversary.

The 1994 exhibition displayed the original manuscript, translated by the museum's art historian Ruth Kraemer, as well as a number of the story's watercolours drawn from the Morgan's permanent collection. Also included with the exhibits was a 20-minute video it produced, My Grown-Up Friend, Saint-Exupéry, narrated by actor Macaulay Culkin, (Note: Although Macaulay Culkin had been earning approximately $8 million per film project at that point, he provided his narration to the museum "for nothing, and we are grateful for his services", according to a Morgan representative.) along with photos of the author, correspondence to Consuelo, a signed first edition of The Little Prince, and several international editions in other languages.

In January 2014, the museum mounted a third, significantly larger, exhibition centered on the novella's creative origins and its history. The major showing of The Little Prince: A New York Story celebrated the story's 70th anniversary. It examined both the novella's New York origins and Saint-Exupéry's creative processes, looking at his story and paintings as they evolved from conceptual germ form into progressively more refined versions and finally into the book's highly polished first edition. It was as if visitors were able to look over his shoulder as he worked, according to curator Christine Nelson. Funding for the 2014 exhibition was provided by several benefactors, including The Florence Gould Foundation, The Caroline Macomber Fund, Houghton Mifflin Harcourt, Air France and the New York State Council on the Arts.

The new, more comprehensive exhibits included 35 watercolor paintings and 25 of the work's original 140 handwritten manuscript pages, with his almost illegible handwriting penciled onto 'Fidelity' watermarked onion skin paper. The autograph manuscript pages included struck-through content that was not published in the novella's first edition. As well, some 43 preparatory pencil drawings that evolved into the story's illustrations accompanied the manuscript, many of them dampened by moisture that rippled its onion skin media. One painting depicted the prince floating above Earth wearing a yellow scarf was wrinkled, having been crumpled up and thrown away before being retrieved for preservation. Another drawing loaned from Silvia Hamilton's grandson depicted the diminutive prince observing a sunset on his home asteroid; two other versions of the same drawing were also displayed alongside it allowing visitors to observe the drawing's progressive refinement. The initial working manuscript and sketches, displayed side by side with pages from the novella's first edition, allowed viewers to observe the evolution of Saint-Exupéry's work.

Shortly before departing the United States to rejoin his reconnaissance squadron in North Africa in its struggle against Nazi Germany, Saint-Exupéry appeared unexpectedly in military uniform at the door of his intimate friend, Silvia Hamilton. He presented his working manuscript and its preliminary drawings in a "rumpled paper bag", placed onto her home's entryway table, offering, "I'd like to give you something splendid, but this is all I have". Several of the manuscript pages bore accidental coffee stains and cigarette scorch marks. The Morgan later acquired the 30,000-word manuscript from Hamilton in 1968, with its pages becoming the centrepieces of its exhibitions on Saint-Exupéry's work. The 2014 exhibition also borrowed artifacts and the author's personal letters from the Saint-Exupéry-d'Gay Estate, (Note: The d'Gay portion of the estate refers to Saint-Exupéry's married sister.) as well as materials from other private collections, libraries and museums in the United States and France. Running concurrent with its 2014 exhibition, the Morgan held a series of lectures, concerts and film showings, including talks by Saint-Exupéry biographer Stacy Schiff, writer Adam Gopnik, and author Peter Sís on his new work The Pilot and The Little Prince: The Life of Antoine de Saint-Exupéry,

Additional exhibits included photos of Saint-Exupéry by Life photojournalist John Phillips, other photos of the author's New York area homes, an Orson Welles screenplay of the novella the filmmaker attempted to produce as a movie in collaboration with Walt Disney, (Note: Orson Welles purchased the movie rights to the story the day after reading the novella in a single sitting. Welles was unable to persuade Walt Disney to assist him in turning his screenplay of the story into a film, with Disney fearing such a screen release would upstage his own screen adaptations of other stories.) as well as one of the few signed copies extant of The Little Prince, gifted to Hamilton's 12-year-old son. (Note: The signed copy is inscribed "For Stephen, to whom I have already spoken about The Little Prince, and who perhaps will be his friend".)

==== Permanent exhibits ====
- In Le Bourget, Paris, France, the Air and Space Museum of France established a special exhibit honoring Saint-Exupéry, and which displays many of his literary creations. Among them are various early editions of The Little Prince. Remnants of the Free French Air Force P-38 Lightning in which he disappeared, and which were recovered from the Mediterranean in 2004, are also on view.
- In Hakone, Japan there was the Museum of The Little Prince featuring outdoor squares and sculptures such as the B-612 Asteroid, the Lamplighter Square, and a sculpture of the Little Prince. The museum grounds additionally featured a Little Prince Park along with the Consuelo Rose Garden. The museum permanently closed in March 2023.
- In Gyeonggi Province, South Korea, there is an imitation French village, Petite France, which has adapted the story elements of The Little Prince into its architecture and monuments. There are several sculptures of the story's characters, and the village also offers overnight housing in some of the French-style homes. Featured are the history of The Little Prince, an art gallery, and a small amphitheatre situated in the middle of the village for musicians and other performances. The enterprise's director stated that in 2009 the village received a half million visitors.

==== Special exhibitions ====
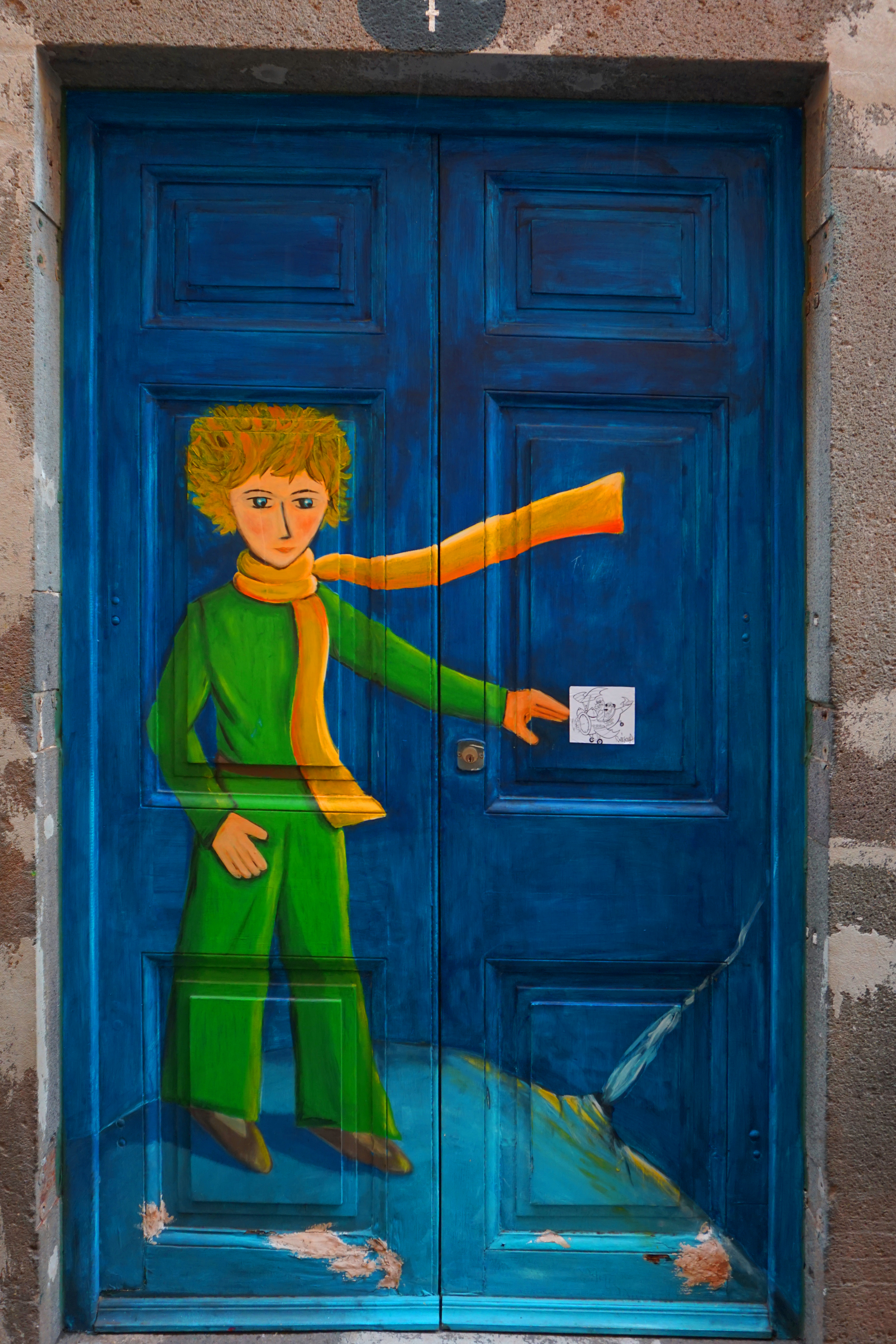
- The Little Prince as part of a street art project in Funchal (Madeira)
  In 1996 the Danish sculptor Jens Galschiøt unveiled an artistic arrangement consisting of seven blocks of granite asteroids 'floating' in a circle around a 2-metre tall planet Earth. The artistic universe was populated by bronze sculpture figures that the little prince met on his journeys. As in the book, the prince discovers that "the essential is invisible to the eye, and only by the heart can you really see". The work was completed at the start of 1996 and placed in the central square of Fuglebjerg, Denmark, but was later stolen from an exhibition in Billund in 2011.
- During 2009 in São Paulo, Brazil, the giant Oca Art Exhibition Centre presented The Little Prince as part of The Year of France and The Little Prince. The displays covered over 10,000 square metres on four floors, examining Saint-Exupéry, The Little Prince and their philosophies, as visitors passed through theme areas of the desert, different worlds, stars and the cosmos. The ground floor of the exhibit area was laid out as a huge map of the routes flown by the author and Aeropostale in South America and around the world. Also included was a full-scale replica of his Caudron Simoun, crashed in a simulated Sahara Desert.
- In 2012 the Catalan architect Jan Baca unveiled a sculpture in Terrassa, Catalonia showing the Little Prince along with the sentence, "It is only with the heart that one can see rightly; what is essential is invisible to the eye".
- In February 2022, nearly eight decades after it was written, "The Little Prince" arrived in Paris. The exhibit began on February 17 and ended on June 26. It contained 600 items, including photographs, poems, and newspaper clippings relating to "The Little Prince."
- From 12 February – 14 March 2026, A2Z Art Gallery, Paris, exhibited One Rose, A Thousand Worlds which examined The Little Prince's legacy through the contemporary art of 17 French and Asian artists.

=== Places ===
==== Playground ====
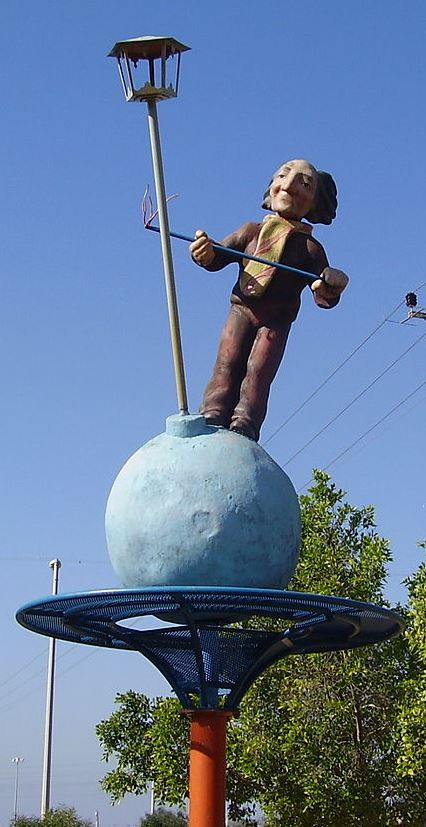
Sculpture of the lamplighter in a "story playground" themed after The Little Prince in Holon, Israel

- One of the "story playgrounds" – a series of playgrounds themed after famous children's stories in Holon, Israel – is themed after The Little Prince. It features sculptures and play structures depicting scenes and characters from the book.

==== Schools ====
- L'école Le Petit Prince is the public elementary school in the small community of Genech in northern France, dedicated in 1994 upon the merger of two former schools. With nine classrooms and a library, its building overlooks the village's Place Terre des Hommes, a square also named in tribute to Saint-Exupéry's 1939 philosophical memoir, Terre des hommes.
- A K–6 elementary school on Avro Road in Maple, Ontario, Canada, was also opened in 1994 as L'école élémentaire catholique Le Petit Prince. Its enrollment expanded from 30 students in its first year to some 325 children by 2014. One of Saint-Exupéry's colourful paintings of the prince is found on its website's welcome page.

==== Avenue ====
- In southern Brazil, in the city of Florianópolis, there is the Avenida Pequeno Príncipe (Little Prince Avenue in Portuguese), whose name is a tribute to Saint-Exupéry, who passed through the city during his aviator career, an event that became part of the local culture.
- At 972 Fifth Avenue in New York City, a bronze statue was unveiled of the Little Prince by French Minister for Europe and Foreign Affairs Catherine Colonna in September 2023. The project to create the sculpture was initiated by the American Society of Le Souvenir Français, in partnership with the Antoine de Saint-Exupéry Youth Foundation. The sculpture sits outside the headquarters of the Cultural Services of the French Embassy, overlooking the pedestrians on Fifth Avenue. The four-foot-tall sculpture, created by Jean-Marc de Pas, was carved from clay and cast in bronze in one single piece in his studio in Normandy.

=== Insignia and awards ===
- Prior to its decommissioning in 2010, the GR I/33 (later renamed as the 1/33 Belfort Squadron), one of the French Air Force squadrons Saint-Exupéry flew with, adopted the image of the Little Prince as part of the squadron and tail insignia of its Dassault Mirage fighter jets. Some of the fastest jets in the world were flown with The Prince gazing over their pilots' shoulders.
- The Little Prince Literary Award for Persian fiction by writers under the age of 15, commemorating the title of Saint-Exupéry's famous work, was created in Iran by the Cheragh-e Motale'eh Literary Foundation. In 2012, some 250 works by young authors were submitted for first stage review according to the society's secretary Maryam Sistani, with the selection of the best three writers from 30 finalists being conducted in Tehran that September.
- Several other Little Prince Awards have also been established in Europe, meant to promote achievement and excellence in a variety of fields such as in assistance to autistic children, child literacy, children's literature (by adults), Puppetry theatre and theatre arts.

=== Numismatics and philatelic ===
- Before France adopted the euro as its currency, Saint-Exupéry and drawings from The Little Prince were on the 50-franc banknote; the artwork was by Swiss designer Roger Pfund. Among the anti-counterfeiting measures on the banknote was micro-printed text from Le Petit Prince, visible with a strong magnifying glass. Additionally, a 100-franc commemorative coin was also released in 2000, with Saint-Exupéry's image on its obverse, and that of the Little Prince on its reverse.
- Philatelic tributes have been printed in at least 24 countries as of 2011.

=== Astronomy ===
- The B612 Foundation is a private foundation created to track Near-Earth objects that might pose a threat to Earth, and is dedicated to protecting the planet from asteroid strikes, similar to the Tunguska event of 1908. The private foundation was founded by a group of U.S. scientists and astronauts, including Clark Chapman, Piet Hut, Rusty Schweickart and Ed Lu in October 2002. The non-profit organization is named in honour of the prince's home asteroid.
- An asteroid discovered in 1975, 2578 Saint-Exupéry, was also named after the author of The Little Prince.
- Another asteroid discovered in 1993 was named 46610 Bésixdouze, which is French for "B six twelve". The asteroid's number, 46610, becomes B612 in hexadecimal notation. B-612 was the name of the prince's home asteroid.
- In 2003 a small asteroid moon, Petit-Prince, discovered earlier in 1998, was named in part after The Little Prince.

=== Professional wrestling ===
French professional wrestler Daniel Dubail was billed as Le Petit Prince. Pakistani-British professional wrestler Mohammed Allam was billed as The Little Prince.

=== The Little Prince Day ===
Since 2020, June 29 is International Little Prince Day. This date was chosen to commemorate the birth of Antoine de Saint-Exupéry, which occurred on June 29, 1900. The Antoine de Saint-Exupéry Foundation started the initiative striving to promote the humanist values carried by the book published in 1943. Mark Osborne was one of the first personalities to participate in the Little Prince Day 2020.

=== Merchandise and collaboration ===
In 2023, The Little Prince inspired a collaboration with Chinese toy brand Pop Mart and artist Hideaki Kawashima's Hirono series. Titled "Pop Mart x Le Petit Prince – La Nouvelle Série de Figurines par Hirono", the collection features reinterpretations of characters from the novella, including the Little Prince, the Rose, and the Fox. The figurines depict scenes such as the Little Prince standing atop his asteroid B612 and interacting with the Fox under a starry sky. The collaboration was marketed as a celebration of the story's themes of love, friendship, and exploration.

The Montblanc Luxury Writing Instrument Company created three series of luxury fountain pens based on the Little Prince series, including the Le Petit Prince, the Le Petit Prince Aviator and the Le Petit Prince and Planet pens in various models.

== See also ==
- List of The Little Prince adaptations, a listing of The Little Prince story adapted into various media.
- The Little Prince (1974 film), a 1974 musical film directed by Stanley Donen
- The Little Prince (play), a theatrical adaptation
- The Little Prince (opera), an opera in two acts by Rachel Portman to an English libretto by Nicholas Wright
- The Adventures of The Little Prince (TV series), an anime series
- The Little Prince and the Aviator, a 1981 musical theatre adaptation
- Eloise at the Plaza, a 2003 TV film in which many references to The Little Prince can be identified
- The Little Prince (TV series), a 2010 TV series
- The Little Prince (2015 film), a 2015 animated film directed by Mark Osborne
- Le Monde's 100 Books of the Century
- Invisible Essence: The Little Prince, a 2018 documentary film about the book
