= Indigo (film) =

- Film poster for Indigo
- Directed by: Stephen Deutsch (as Stephen Simon)
- Written by: James Twyman; Neale Donald Walsch
- Produced by: Stephen Deutsch (as Stephen Simon)
- Starring: Neale Donald Walsch; Dane Bowman
- Edited by: Sherril Schlesinger
- Music by: Emilio Kauderer
- Distributed by: Monterey Home Video
- Release date: December 5, 2003
- Running time: 89 minutes
- Country: United States
- Language: English
- Budget: $500,000
- Box office: $1.2 million (US)

Indigo is a 2003 American fantasy drama film produced and directed by Stephen Deutsch (credited as Stephen Simon). The film deals with the supposed phenomenon of "indigo children" — a set of children alleged to have certain "special psychological and spiritual attributes". Its release was sponsored by the Spiritual Cinema Circle, a DVD club that mails spiritually themed films to subscribers each month.

== Plot ==
At the beginning of the story Ray Talloway (Neale Donald Walsch) is a construction manager whose business is near bankruptcy. His semi-estranged daughter Cheryl (Sarah Rutan) quarrels with him on the slightest pretext, while her husband Alex (Gregory Linington) is one of a small group of minor criminals. Cheryl and Alex have one daughter, Grace (shared role by Meghan McCandless as older Grace and Angelina Hess as younger Grace), who is the indigo child of the story, and who eventually reunites the family.

One night, Alex takes Cheryl to a "party" that promises something exciting to happen to the participants (presumably overuse of drugs). Cheryl is worried by leaving Grace alone in the car; therefore, Alex leaves to check on her. A few minutes later, a police detachment arrests every one of the criminals. Grace, who was asleep in the car, wakes and sees her mother taken to prison. Ray, who is asleep at home, receives a call from the police station informing him of his daughter's arrest. He goes to the police station, arriving deep in telephone conversation with one of his business partners, who warns him of protest by environmentalists at the site of one of his latest projects. This causes him to abandon his daughter at the station and drive to the site. The sight of the crowd protesting his efforts to eradicate a forest to make room for a new highway, combined with the effect of having his daughter arrested, causes him to experience a small nervous breakdown.

Here, the film jumps ahead five years. In the interim, Ray has lost his job and is living at home alone, as the owner of a very old car which is on the verge of disintegration. Cheryl has been in jail for possession of illegal drugs even though she is innocent. Ray has neither come to visit her nor bailed her out of prison. Grace is living in a children's home superintended by a nurse (Saffron Henke). Alex has fled, possibly to Canada, and has not appeared since.

A visit by her lawyer leaves Cheryl afraid for Grace's safety, the lawyer having intimated that Alex might kidnap Grace in exchange for money he believes to be in Cheryl's possession. After this scene is over, viewers see the lawyer walking to a car and accepting a bribe. Cheryl, who has not seen this, calls Ray asking that he visit her. When he arrives, Cheryl tells him of the lawyer's information and asks him to retrieve Grace and take care of her until Cheryl is released on parole. Ray does so, out of a sense of duty towards his daughter and guilt at being an inadequate father and grandfather. Upon her reappearance, Grace is revealed to have developed her supermundane abilities to the point where they are unsettling to Ray, who unceremoniously kidnaps her with her consent and aid. Having escaped, the two meet with Ray's girlfriend Sally (Lynette Louise), who temporarily harbors them. Ray and Grace later drive north to Ashland, Oregon, where they think to hide until Cheryl's parole takes effect. On the way, they spend the night in a hotel and begin to develop a bond. The hotel manager is astonished next morning when Grace brings his father, who suffers a severe case of Alzheimer's disease, into waking consciousness. He reacts with the accusation that it is the work of the devil, whereupon Ray and Grace leave, while the father and son begin to reconcile.

At a park, Grace befriends a lonely boy called Nicholas, who like her is one of the indigo children. The nature thereof is explained to Ray (and thus to the viewer) by Nicholas' mother while the children play.

Further north, Ray's car finally fails to operate so that he and Grace are forced to walk. They are befriended by a group of teenagers who are on their way to Mt. Ashland, with whom they spend the night in a cabin. One of the teenagers, Logan (played by Neale's son, Karus Walsch), is disturbed by Grace's recounting a story of his childhood that revives painful memories. According to her, Logan could communicate with angels as a boy but suppressed his ability when his older brother beat him whenever he talked about it. Another one of the teenagers, Emma, expresses skepticism and anger at Grace's powers, especially when Grace claims to see the spirit of Emma's mother; later, Emma accepts Grace's ways and becomes grateful.

When Ray and Grace arrive at the arranged cabin, they find to Ray's surprise that it is occupied by Ray's long-estranged son Stewart (Dane Bowman). Stewart is there to collect the money that he thinks Cheryl hid and believes that Grace knows where it is. He takes her hostage; at this, Ray claims that Grace requires a medicine that is in his suitcase. Stewart allows Ray to open the suitcase, in which is no medicine but a pistol, with which Ray intends to frighten his son. As Ray reaches for the pistol, he suddenly recalls his past and reconsiders his decision. He attempts to apologize to Stewart, but Stewart refuses to accept this. An arrival of two police officers at the cabin surprises them all, with the exception of Grace, who had summoned them. Grace reveals that the younger of the two, Officer Whitfield, was one of the officers who had captured Cheryl, and that he has illegally been using the money Stewart sought.

The film ends with the reconciliation and reunion of the family.

== Cast ==
- Neale Donald Walsch as Ray Talloway
- Sarah Rutan as Cheryl
- Gregory Linington as Alex
- Meghan McCandless as Grace
- Dane Bowman as Stewart Talloway
- Nancy Rodriguez as Diane
- Jackson Rowe as Jimmy
- Heather Simon as Emma

== Release ==
The film was released in the US on January 28, 2005, and played in 603 locations, where it grossed $1,190,000. The film was distributed primarily to New Thought churches, which shared in the film's revenue.

== Reception ==
Writing in Luminous: The Spiritual Life on Film, Mike King called the film "crass and alienated beyond belief". King described its lack of emotion as "a product of cultural autism" and said that the film reveals New Age anxieties.

== Awards and nominations ==
- Santa Fe Film Festival
  - Won: Audience Award
