= John Phillips (photographer) =

John Phillips (1954)

John Phillips (November 13, 1914 in Bouïra, Algeria – August 22, 1996 in Manhattan, New York City) was a photographer for Life magazine from the 1930s to the 1950s who was known for his war photographs.

French by birth, John Phillips was born in Algeria, to a Welsh emigre father and an American mother. He spent his early childhood in an Arab world, before his family moved to France in 1925, first to Paris and then to Nice.

He was hired by Life in 1936 and his first assignment was to cover Edward VIII's opening of Parliament. His pictures were included in the magazine's first issue (on November 23, 1936) and he went on to cover many events of the Second World War. He photographed Yugoslav guerrilla leader Draža Mihailović in June 1946 during his trial in Belgrade. He shot the last images of Antoine de Saint-Exupéry in 1944. Saint Exupery, days before he disappeared, gave Phillips a manuscript, "Letter to an American " which Phillips eventually donated to France. He documented the expulsion of Jews and the destruction and sacking of the Jewish Quarter that took place during the Battle for Jerusalem during the 1947–1949 Palestine war. Phillips disguised himself as a British member of the Arab Legion to get in, managing to avoid censorship from the Arab authorities.

John Phillips has been described as the "grand-godfather of photo-journalism, a master of lenses and multiple languages; elegant, exuberant and chrome-steel effectual, who has recorded in his own peripatetic way some of the freshest footprints of history."

He had almost completed his autobiography when he died. The book was published posthumously by Scalo as "Free Spirit in a Troubled World"

In 2010 the United States Postal Service issued a stamp commemorating WW II cartoonist Bill Mauldin. The stamp features a portrait of Mauldin taken in December 1943 by John Phillips.

== Books ==
- "Odd World: a photo-reporter's story" (1959) Simon & Schuster, NY
- "Bled to the Gutter: a photo-reporter's story" (1960) Weidenfeld and Nicolson, London.
- "The Italians: face of a nation" (1965) Mcgraw-Hill, NY.
- Jerusalem: A Will To Survive (1976) Dial Press
- Yugoslav Story (1984)
- It Happened in Our Lifetime (1985) Little, Brown
- Poet and Pilot Antoine de Saint-Exupery (1994) Scalo
- Free Spirit in a Troubled World (1996) Scalo
