= The Tent (Atwood book) =

- First edition
- Author: Margaret Atwood
- Illustrator: Margaret Atwood
- Language: English
- Publisher: Bloomsbury
- Publication date: 2006
- Publication place: Canada
- Media type: Print (Hardcover, Paperback)
- Pages: 176
- ISBN: 978-0747584940
- OCLC: 58728704

The Tent is a book by Canadian author Margaret Atwood, published in 2006. Although classified with Atwood’s short fiction, it has been characterized as an “experimental” collection of “fictional essays" or “mini-fictions.” It also incorporates line drawings by Atwood.

The collection features themes familiar in Atwood’s works, including a feminist portrayal of “national” childhood, the burdens of fame, and the reworking of classical mythology.

Several of the stories were previously published to benefit the World Wildlife Federation, the Indian Ocean Tsunami Earthquake Charities, the Hay-On-Wye Festival in Wales, and the Harbourfront Reading Series in Toronto.
