= Le Monde de l'éducation =

Former French magazine

- Editor-in-chief: Brigitte Perucca
- Frequency: Monthly
- First issue: December 1974
- Final issue: December 2008
- Company: Groupe La Vie-Le Monde
- Country: France
- Based in: Paris
- Language: French
- Website: Le Monde de l'éducation
- ISSN: 0337-9213
- OCLC: 463406444

Le Monde de l'éducation (The World of Education) is a former magazine published monthly from 1974 to 2008 by the press group Groupe La Vie-Le Monde. This magazine was a reference in the treatment of contemporary issues of the French education system. In 2008, Le Monde de l'éducation announced the end of its release. The website, however, announced it would continue as a supplement to the newspaper Le Monde.
