= Conversations with God =

1995–2017 book series by Neale Donald Walsch

- Book 1 in the series (North America book cover)
- Author: Neale Donald Walsch
- No. of books: 9

Conversations with God (CWG) is a sequence of books written by Neale Donald Walsch. It was written as a dialogue in which Walsch asks questions and God answers. The first book of the Conversations with God series, Conversations with God, Book 1: An Uncommon Dialogue, was published in 1995 and became a publishing phenomenon, staying on The New York Times Best Sellers List for 137 weeks.

In an interview with Larry King, Walsch described the inception of the books as follows: at a low period in his life, Walsch wrote an angry letter to God asking questions about why his life wasn't working. After writing down all of his questions, he heard a voice over his right shoulder say: "Do you really want an answer to all these questions or are you just venting?" When Walsch turned around, he saw no one there, yet Walsch felt answers to his questions filling his mind and decided to write them down. The ensuing automatic writing became the Conversations with God books. When asked in a 2010 interview how he opens up to God, Neale stated, "I am reaching out to touch others with this information. When I reach out and touch others with this information, I reconnect immediately with the divine presence."

== Basis of the dialogue ==
The series contains nearly three thousand pages of material. The second and third books in the trilogy deal with political and social issues.

=== Themes ===
In Friendship with God, Walsch writes that God presents four concepts that are central to the entire dialogue:

1. We are all one.
2. There's enough.
3. There's nothing we have to do.
4. Ours is not a better way, ours is merely another way.

Existence is essentially non-dual in nature. At the highest level, there is no separation between anything, and there is only one of us; there is only God, and everything is God. The second statement, following from the first, means that we, in this seeming existence, lack nothing, and if we choose to realize it, we have enough of whatever we think we need (or the means to create it) within us. The third statement combines the first two to conclude that God, being all there is and is thus always sufficient unto itself, has no need for anything and therefore has no requirements of humanity. The final concept puts an end to our need always to be correct. Given that we have and are everything, and there's nothing we have to do, there is an infinite number of ways to experience this, not just the one way we may have chosen so far.

According to the books, God recommends many economic and social changes if people want to make a more functional, adaptable, and sustainable world. The books recommend that more attention should focus on the environment. The conversations also speak of reincarnation and the existence of life on other planets.

=== God's motive for creation ===
In Walsch's first dialogue, God notes that "knowing" and "experiencing" oneself are different things. Before creation, there was only That-Which-Is, which cannot know or experience itself fully without something it is not. It cannot know itself as love since nothing exists but love. It cannot know itself as giving since nothing else exists to give to. It cannot experience itself in myriad ways because everything is one.

In Walsch's viewpoint, this present creation is established by and within God so that sentience can exist, which does not directly remember its true nature as God. Split into infinite forms, all life can live, experience, and recreate its nature as God, rather than "know" itself as the creator in theory. It is essentially a game, entered into by agreement, to remember who and what we are and enjoy and create, knowing that ultimately there is no finish line that some will not reach, no understanding that is not without value, no act that does not add meaning to the future or for others. Walsch claims that God says that we have a common interest in keeping the game going. There is nothing else to do except to experience our existence and then experience more of it, to uncover deeper layers of truth and understanding. There are no external rules because all experience is subjective and chosen. But within this, there are ways that people will gradually come to see their thoughts, words, and actions are either working or not working. A thing is either functional or dysfunctional, not right or wrong. These rememberings take place over "time" and can take hundreds and thousands of lifetimes.

=== Nature of the dialogue ===
- Book 1 (PG.4) argues that words are not the ultimate truth; instead, words are symbols and are open to interpretations. Thus the readers are advised to consult their inner knowing or intuition to determine their truth while reading the book or any other book. Though the books bear the title Conversations with God and the author states in book one that he is "taking dictation" from God, the dialogue is said to be between God and all people at all times. The question, according to Neale, is not to who does God talk, but who listens. This is clarified by the statement that God can communicate with people in many ways (the next song you hear, the next sunset you experience, the next time you hear laughter, the next movie that moves you), and not necessarily through words 'spoken' by God to a person. "All these devices are mine. All these avenues are open to me. I will speak to you if you invite me." (Book 1, PG 58).
- Jesus is said to have sought to lead by example, which is why he said, "I am the way and the life, follow me". Follow me meant that we should follow his example and become one with God rather than become his (Jesus) followers. Jesus and other living things are/were not one with God presently (everything is happening right now with no space/time difference). Jesus is supposed to have said, "The Father (God) and I are one, and you are my brethren". This means that living things are all one (particles of the collective God) (Book 3, Chapter 20, PG. 329-330).
- Jesus is said to have said, "without the Father (God), I am nothing". The Father of all is pure thought, the energy of life (Book 3, Chapter 11, PG. 180).
- In Book 3 of Conversations with God (1998), by Neale Donald Walsch, it is mentioned that Mahavatar Babaji may at one time have resurrected himself from the dead, just like Lazarus, Jesus and other humans. When Neale asks God if reincarnation is a false doctrine, God replies that it is not. Neale then asks why some religions do not know the truth about something so basic. In response, God says that we must understand that humans have many fear-based religions whose teachings surround the doctrine of a God who is to be worshipped and feared. It was through fear that the entire Earth society reformed itself from a matriarchy into patriarchy.
- Through fear, the holy priests got people to mend their wicked ways and heed the word of the Lord. It was through fear that the churches gained and controlled their membership. Churches even insisted that God will punish you if you did not go to church every Sunday. Not going to church was declared a sin - and not just any church, it had to be a particular one.
- One had to attend one particular church. If you went to a church of a different denomination, that too was a sin. That was an attempt at control using fear. It worked. People will always believe in hell and a God who would send them there as long as we believe that God is like man — ruthless, self-serving, unforgiving, and vengeful.

== Parallels in other belief systems ==
The dialogue presents many philosophical ideas that prominent Eastern and Western thinkers had already advanced earlier. Still, Walsch explains the information in language for modern readers and does not explicitly cite these philosophers. Walsch claims that he had never known most of these ideas before his revelatory experiences. Since the beginning of the series, and especially in the later volumes, Walsch and "God" acknowledge that most of the concepts presented are previously known to humanity but are profound enough to warrant being explored repeatedly and put into this cohesive, unified form. Since humanity is still mired in strife and conflict, there is value in their restatement. Fundamental parts of Walsch's writings are also mirrored within other well-known spiritual writings and traditions:

- All things are one, there is no polarity, no right or wrong, no disharmony, but only identity. All is one, and that one is love/light, light/love, the Infinite Creator. (The Ra Material)
- Souls reincarnate to eventually experience God-realization (Hinduism/Bhagavad-Gita/Sikhism).
- Feelings are more important as a source of guidance than intellect (Rousseau/Sikhism).
- We are not here to learn anything new but to remember what we already know (Hinduism/Plato/Sikhism).
- Physical reality is an illusion (Hinduism/Buddhism's concept of maya/Sikhism, as well as Christian Science).
- One cannot understand one thing unless he or she understands its opposite (Tao Te Ching).
- God is everything. (Hinduism/Spinoza/Brahman/Sikhism/Pandeism/Pantheism)
- God is self-experiential, in that it is the nature of the Universe to experience itself. (Hinduism/Hegel/Sikhism/Pandeism, and process theology as first outlined by Alfred North Whitehead)
- God is not fear-inducing or vengeful, only our parental projections onto God are. (Sikhism)
- Fear or love are the two basic alternative perspectives on life. (Drewermann)
- Good and evil do not exist (as absolutes, but can exist in a different context and for different reasons). (Nietzsche/Sikhism)
- Reality is a representation created by will. (Schopenhauer/Sikhism)
- Nobody knowingly desires evil. (Socrates/Stoicism/Sikhism) (see: Moral intellectualism)

== Bibliography ==
=== Complete title list of all CWG books ===
==== Dialogue Books series ====
The following are the ten books in the Conversations With God Dialogue Books series. Each of these books is a claimed transcript of dialogue between two beings, Neale Donald Walsch and "God", with the exception of Communion with God, which is written only by "God".

1. Conversations with God: An Uncommon Dialogue (Book 1) (1995) ISBN 978-0-39914-278-9
2. Conversations with God: An Uncommon Dialogue (Book 2) (1997) ISBN 978-1-57174-056-4
3. Conversations with God: An Uncommon Dialogue (Book 3) (1998) ISBN 978-1-57174-103-5
4. Friendship with God: An Uncommon Dialogue (1999) ISBN 978-0-39914-541-4
5. Communion With God: An Uncommon Dialogue (2000) ISBN 978-0-39914-670-1
6. Conversations with God for Teens (2001) ISBN 978-157174-263-6
7. The New Revelations: A Conversation with God (2002) ISBN 978-0-7434-6303-4
8. Tomorrow's God: Our Greatest Spiritual Challenge (2004) ISBN 978-0-74346-304-1
9. Home with God: In a Life That Never Ends (2006) ISBN 978-0-74326-716-8
10. Conversations with God: Awaken the Species (Book 4) (2017) ISBN 978-1-93790-749-5

Home With God, we are told, is the final book in this series of two-way written communication {see HwG page 308, "Our final conversation in public."}. In August 2016, however, Neale stumbled upon a "new and unexpected dialogue" continuing the original trilogy with a fourth installment released on March 27, 2017.

The first three books in the series are often called the CwG trilogy. In 2005, the trilogy was re-released as one combined 'Gift Edition' book. This edition contains the entire text of the first three books with God's words in blue ink and Neale's in black ink, and features a combined 3-in-1 index at the back:

1. The Complete Conversations with God (October 20, 2005) ISBN 978-0-39915-329-7

==== Supplementary titles ====
1. What God Wants: A Compelling Answer to Humanity's Biggest Question (March 21, 2005) ISBN 978-0-74326-714-4
2. Bringers of the Light (May 31, 2000) ISBN 978-0-96787-550-7
3. Recreating Your Self (June 1, 2000) ISBN 978-0-96787-551-4
4. Questions and Answers on Conversations With God (October 1, 1999) ISBN 978-1-57174-140-0
5. Moments of Grace: When God Touches Our Lives Unexpectedly (July 2001) ISBN 978-1-57174-303-9
6. Neale Donald Walsch on Relationships (September 29, 1999) ISBN 978-1-57174-163-9
7. Neale Donald Walsch on Holistic Living (September 30, 1999) ISBN 978-1-57174-165-3
8. Neale Donald Walsch on Abundance and Right Livelihood (October 1, 1999) ISBN 978-1-57174-164-6
9. Happier Than God: Turn Ordinary Life into an Extraordinary Experience (February 28, 2008) ISBN 978-1-57174-576-7
10. The Holy Experience (free eBook)
11. The Conversations with God Companion: The Essential Tool for Individual and Group Study (May 21, 2009) ISBN 978-1-57174-604-7
12. When Everything Changes, Change Everything: In a Time of Turmoil, a Pathway to Peace (May 7, 2009) ISBN 978-1-57174-606-1
13. When Everything Changes, Change Everything: Workbook & Study Guide (March 10, 2011) ISBN 978-1-45152-991-3
14. The Storm Before the Calm (Book 1 in the Conversations with Humanity Series) (September 27, 2011) ISBN 978-1-40193-692-1
15. The Only Thing That Matters (Book 2 in the Conversations with Humanity Series) (October 16, 2012) ISBN 978-1-40194-236-6
16. What God Said: The 25 Core Messages of Conversations With God That Will Change Your Life and the World (October 2013) ISBN 978-1-10163-098-3
17. God's Message To The World: You've Got Me All Wrong (October 2014) ISBN 978-1-93790-730-3
18. Conversations With God for Parents: Sharing the Messages with Children (Book 3 in the Conversations with Humanity Series) (October 2015) ISBN 978-1-93790-736-5
19. Where God and Medicine Meet: A conversation between a doctor and a spiritual messenger (November 2016) ISBN 978-1-93790-748-8
20. The Little Soul and the Sun: A Children's Parable Adapted from Conversations With God (April 1, 1998) ISBN 978-1-57174-087-8
21. The Little Soul And the Earth: A Children's Parable Adapted From Conversations With God (August 1, 2005) (with Frank Riccio) ISBN 978-1-57174-451-7
22. Santa's God: A Children's Fable About the Biggest Question Ever (October 2, 2009) ISBN 978-1-57174-596-5

==== Additional texts ====
1. Guidebook to Conversations with God
  - Conversations with God for Teens Guidebook (by Jeanne Webster and Emily Welch) (June 20, 2008) ISBN 978-0-98152-063-6
  - Conversations with God – Guidebook, Book 1 (July 1, 1997) ISBN 1-57174-048-1
  - Conversations with God – Guidebook, Book 1 (by Nancy Ways) (November 10, 2008) ISBN 978-0-98194-380-0
  - Conversations with God – Guidebook, Book 2 (by Anne-Marie Barbier) (November 10, 2008) ISBN 978-0-98152-069-8
  - Conversations with God – Guidebook, Book 3 (by Alissa Goefron) (December 1, 2008) ISBN 978-0-98194-382-4
2. Meditations from Conversations with God
  - Meditations from Conversations With God (December 31, 2005) ISBN 978-1-57174-513-2
  - Meditations from Conversations With God: Book 1 (September 2, 1999) ISBN 978-0-34076-595-1
  - Meditations from Conversations With God, Book 2: A Personal Journal (December 1, 1997) ISBN 978-1-57174-072-4
3. The Wedding Vows from Conversations With God (with Nancy Fleming-Walsch) (April 1, 2000) ISBN 978-1-57174-161-5
4. The Little Book of Life: A User's Manual (October 1, 2010) ISBN 978-1-57174-644-3
5. Conversations with God in a Nutshell: A Pocket Guide to the Dialogue (2014) ISBN 978-0-99133-460-5

=== Supplemental material ===
Please see the Writings at Neale Donald Walsch.

== Movie (2006) ==
A Conversations with God movie shows the author's experience and opened in theatres across the United States on October 27, 2006. Walsch is played by Henry Czerny in the film directed by Stephen Deutsch. The DVD version of the film was released on February 27, 2007.

== Audiobook ==
Conversations with God books 1 and 2, and Communion with God, narrated by Ed Asner.

== See also ==
- Alien hand syndrome
- Split-brain
