= Indigo children =

Children who are believed to possess special traits or abilities

Indigo children, according to a pseudoscientific New Age concept, are children who are believed to possess special, unusual, and sometimes supernatural traits or abilities. The idea is based on concepts developed in the 1970s by Nancy Ann Tappe, who wrote that she had been noticing indigo children beginning in the late 1960s. Her ideas were further developed by Lee Carroll and Jan Tober. The concept of indigo children gained popular interest with the publication of a series of books in the late 1990s and the release of several films in the following decade. A variety of books, conferences, and related materials have been created surrounding belief in the idea of indigo children and their nature and abilities. The interpretations of these beliefs range from their being the next stage in human evolution to the belief that they are more empathetic and creative than their peers.

No scientific studies give credibility to the existence of indigo children or their traits. Some parents choose to label their children who have been diagnosed with learning disabilities as an indigo child to alternatively diagnose them. Critics view this as a way for parents to avoid considering pediatric treatment or a psychiatric diagnosis. Some lists of traits used to describe indigo children have also been criticized for being vague enough to be applied to most people, a form of the Forer effect.

== Origins ==
The term "indigo children" originated with parapsychologist and self-described synesthete and psychic Nancy Ann Tappe, who developed the concept in the 1970s. In 1982, Tappe published a comb-bound version which she expanded and republished in paperback in 1986 as Understanding Your Life Thru Color. In these works Tappe introduced the concept of "life colors", defined in Understanding Your Life Thru Color as "the single color of the aura that remains constant in most people from the cradle to the grave". The concept of "life colors" was popularized nationally by Tappe's student Barbara Bowers, who published What Color Is Your Aura?: Personality Spectrums for Understanding and Growth in 1989, and by Bowers' student Pamala Oslie, who published Life Colors: What the Colors in Your Aura Reveal in 1991.

Tappe stated that during the late 1960s and early 1970s she began noticing that many children were being born with indigo auras (or, in her terminology, with indigo as their "life color"). The idea was later popularized by the 1998 book The Indigo Children: The New Kids Have Arrived, written by husband and wife self-help lecturers Lee Carroll and Jan Tober.

In 2002, the first international conference on indigo children was held in Hawaii, drawing 600 attendees, and there have been subsequent conferences in Florida, Oregon, and elsewhere. Several films have been produced on the subject, including two films by New Age writer James Twyman: a 2003 feature film Indigo and a 2006 documentary The Indigo Evolution.

Sarah W. Whedon suggests in a 2009 article in Nova Religio that the social construction of indigo children is a response to an "apparent crisis of American childhood" in the form of increased youth violence and diagnoses of attention deficit hyperactivity disorder. Whedon believes parents label their children as "indigo" to provide an alternative explanation for their children's improper behavior, which is stemming from ADHD.

== Attributed characteristics ==
Descriptions of indigo children include that they:

- Are empathic, curious, and strong-willed
- Are often perceived by friends and family as being strange
- Possess a clear sense of self-definition and purpose
- Show a strong innate subconscious spirituality from early childhood (which, however, does not necessarily imply a direct interest in spiritual or religious areas)
- Have a strong feeling of entitlement, or deserving to be here

Other attributed traits include:

- High intelligence quotient
- Inherent intuitive ability
- Resistance to rigid, control-based paradigms of authority

According to Tober and Carroll, indigo children may function poorly in conventional schools due to their rejection of rigid authority, their being smarter or more spiritually mature than their teachers, and their lack of response to guilt-, fear- or manipulation-based discipline.

According to research psychologist Russell Barkley, the New Age movement has yet to produce empirical evidence of the existence of indigo children, as the traits most commonly attributed to them are closely aligned with the Forer effect—so vague that they could describe nearly anyone. Many critics see the concept of indigo children as made up of extremely general traits, a sham diagnosis that is an alternative to a medical diagnosis, with a complete lack of science or studies to support it.

=== Indigo as an alternative to diagnosis ===
Retired professor of philosophy and skeptic Robert Todd Carroll notes that many of the commentators on the indigo phenomenon are of varying qualifications and expertise, and parents may prefer labeling their child an indigo as an alternative to a diagnosis that implies poor parenting, narcissistic parenting, damage, or mental illness. This is a belief echoed by academic psychologists. Some mental health experts are concerned that labeling a disruptive child an "indigo" may delay proper diagnosis and treatment that could help the child or look into the parenting style that may be causing the behavior. Others have stated that many of the traits of indigo children could be more prosaically interpreted as simple unruliness and alertness.

=== Relationship to attention-deficit hyperactivity disorder ===
Many children labeled indigo by their parents are diagnosed with attention-deficit hyperactivity disorder (ADHD) and Tober and Carroll's book The Indigo Children linked the concept with diagnosis of ADHD. David Cohen points out that labeling a child an indigo is an alternative to a diagnosis that implies mental illness, which may appeal to many parents. Cohen has stated, "The view in medicine is that ADHD is a defect. It's a disorder. If you're a parent, the idea of 'gifted' is much more appealing than the idea of a disorder." Linking the concept of indigo children with the distaste for the use of Ritalin to control ADHD, Robert Todd Carroll states "The hype and near-hysteria surrounding the use of Ritalin has contributed to an atmosphere that makes it possible for a book like Indigo Children to be taken seriously. Given the choice, who wouldn't rather believe their children are special and chosen for some high mission rather than that they have a brain disorder?" Stephen Hinshaw, a professor of psychology at the University of California, Berkeley, states that concerns regarding the overmedicalization of children are legitimate but even gifted children with ADHD learn better with more structure rather than less, even if the structure initially causes difficulties. Many labeled as indigo children are or have been home schooled. Many children labeled as indigo children have the same identifying criteria as those children who have experienced being raised by a narcissistic parent, and are considered to have been emotionally abused.

A 2011 study suggested parents of children with ADHD who label their children as "indigos" may perceive problematic behaviors emblematic of ADHD to be more positive and experience less frustration and disappointment, though they still experience more negative emotions and conflicts than parents of children without a diagnosis.

=== Relation to autism ===
Crystal children, a concept related to indigo children, has been linked to the autism spectrum. Proponents recategorize autistic symptoms as telepathic powers, and attempt to reconceptualize "the autistic traits associated with them as part of a positive identity". Autism researcher Mitzi Waltz states that there may be inherent dangers to these beliefs, leading parents to deny the existence of impairments, avoid proven treatments and spend considerable money on unhelpful interventions. Waltz states that "Parents may also transmit belief systems to the child that are self-aggrandizing, confusing, or potentially frightening".

== Commercialization ==
The concept of indigo children has been criticized for being less about children and their needs, and more about the profits to be made by self-styled experts in book and video sales as well as lucrative counseling sessions, summer camps, conferences and speaking engagements.

== Discussion as a new religious movement ==
Nancy Ann Tappe originally noted that one type of Indigo child (the "interdimensional child"), despite being seen as a bully, was expected to lead new religious movements.

One pagan author, Lorna Tedder, anecdotally notes that every pagan woman she knew who had or was going to have a child believed their child was an Indigo child.

S. Zohreh Kermani states that "Despite their problems with authority, uncontrollable tempers, and overbearing egos, Indigo Children are many pagan parents' ideal offspring: sensitive, psychic, and strong willed", but also notes the concept is less about the child's psychic abilities than the parent's own hopes and desire for "distinction from the less-evolved masses."

Daniel Kline, in an essay titled "The New Kids: Indigo Children and New Age Discourse", notes that the magical belief that the innocence of children equates to spiritual powers has existed for centuries, and that the indigo child movement is rooted in a religious rejection of science-based medicine. In particular, he wrote that Nancy Ann Tappe derived some of her ideas from Charles Webster Leadbeater (her main innovation being emphasizing the connection between children and the color indigo), and that the New Age adoption of the concept is a reaction against diagnoses of ADHD and autism. Kline also discusses how Carroll and Tober have tried to distance themselves from religious beliefs about indigo children in order to maintain control of the concept (even recanting their previous affirmations about auras), and how skeptics and New Agers alike both make rhetorical appeals to science (despite the latter's rejection of it) to legitimize their ideological beliefs regarding the existence of indigo children.

At the 2014 University of Cambridge Festival of Ideas, anthropologist Beth Singler discussed how the term indigo children functioned as a new religious movement, along with Jediism. Singler's work focuses on the Indigo movement as a part of an overall discussion on "wider moral panics around children, parenting, the diagnosis of conditions such as ADHD and autism and conspiracy theories about Big Pharma and vaccinations."

== See also ==
- Star people (New Age)
