= Südtirol festival merano. meran =

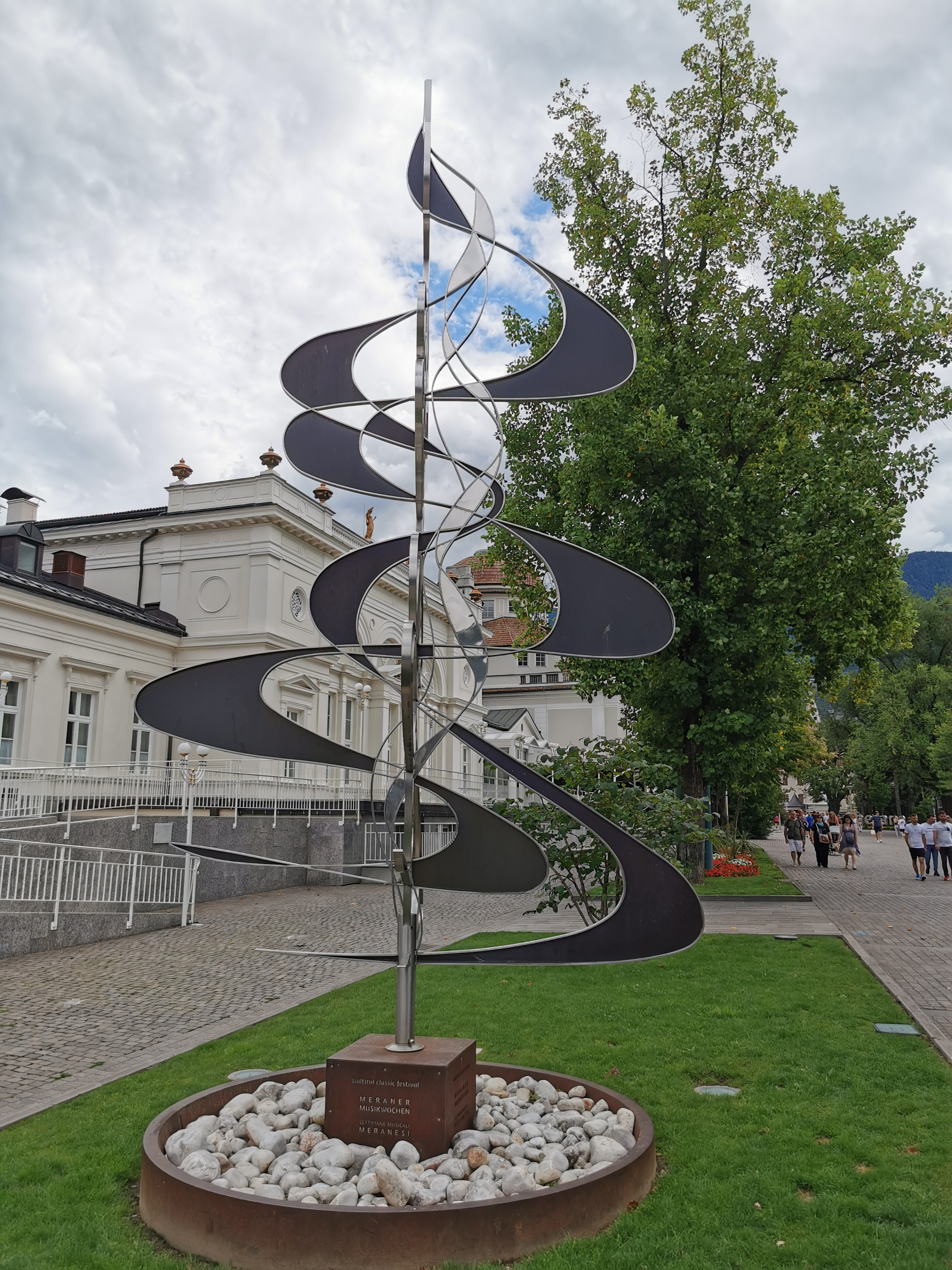
Sculpture of the festival's logo spiral of the sound

The südtirol festival merano. meran, formerly südtirol classic festival, is a music festival in Merano, Italy. It features a wide variety of genres, including classic, baroque, vocal and jazz. The concerts of orchestras, chamber music ensembles, string and vocal groups or soloists take place in the Kurhaus Merano, the city's theatre or surrounding castles and churches in the region. It is thought to be one of the most renowned festivals of its kind in Italy.

== History ==
One of the forerunners of the südtirol festival meran was the Merano Music Festival, which took place in the city's theater in 1922 and 1923. It was founded by the well known physician Adolf Wilhelm Schmidt to boost tourism after the first world war. Richard Strauss was one of the performing musicians in 1922, where he played with opera sopranist Lotte Schöne.

The südtirol classic festival was founded in 1986 on initiative of the local touristic and spa administration to celebrate the 150th anniversary of merano as a spa town. The Trio Aurèle Nicolet opened the festival in the city's theatre on August 17th 1986. It was initially organized as a chamber music series with ten concerts at the art nouveau theatre of Merano with the aim of making the city attractive to an international cultural audience. In 1987, the Merano Music Weeks Association was founded as an independent body. The chamber music series envolved, partucularly after the reopening of the previously renovated Kursaal with 1080 seats and with the support of the two co-artistic directors Heinrich Schiff (1990 and 1991) and Neville Marriner (1992) into a symphonic festival attracting around 11,000 visitors per season.

In 2018, the festival was renamed as südtirol festival merano. meran. In 2026, Herman Schnitzer, who had been president since the festival was foundet 40 years erlier, was succeeded ba Hannes Gamper, an entrepreneur from Dorf Tirol. Since its founding, the festival has taken place every year since its inception and will therefore be in its 42 season in 2027.

== Organisation and structure ==
Since its inception, the festival is taking place in August and September. Hannes Gamper has been the festival's president since 2026, and Andreas Cappello has been its artistic director since its founding.

The südtirol festival merano. meran is member of the European Festivals Association and the Italiafestival association.

== Concerts and venues ==
Kurhaus Merano, the main concert venue

Today there are seven concert series in every season, each with a distinct program: classic with orchestral concerts and recitals (featuring music from the Viennese Classical period to the present day), colours of music with world music and crossover projects, mattinée classique with chamber music, vox humana with sacred and secular vocal music of all ages, barocco with Baroque music, mystica with meditative and spiritual music and young artists portrait with young string ensambles.

The concerts take place in Merano and the surrounding area. Large orchestra concerts, recitals, and some concerts in the coors series are held in the Kursaal Merano which has a capacity of up to 1200 spectators. Some mattinées take place in the Pavillion des Fleurs, the other concerts are held in the city's theatre and nearby castles or churches in the surroundings of Merano. Orchestras and artists from all over the world have performed here.

=== classic ===
The concert series classic is the heart of the festival. The concerts in the newly renovated Kursaal Merano were opened in August 1989 by the Sinfonia Varsovia Orchestra under the direction of Leopold Hager. In 1995, the Orchestra Giovanile Italiana, conducted by Carlo Maria Giulini, gave the festival's 100 concert there. Sir Simon Rattle has performed the 500th concert of the series together with the London Symphony Orchestra. Over the years, nearly all professional orchestras from the british capital have played in Merano. In 2010, the südtirol festival meran invited pianist Fazil Say as artist in residence for several concerts. Violinist Daniel Hope first appeared on stage at the Kursaal in 2012, together with the NDR Symphony Orchestra under the direction of Thomas Hengelbrock. A year later, Daniel Hope was invited as artist in residence, appearing for six concerts on four stage days. Violinist Anne-Sophie Mutter has also performed in Merano, as have cellist Mischa Maisky, violinist Julia Fischer and Patricia Kopatchinskaja, pianist Maria Joao Pires, and Yuja Wang. Many important overseas orchestras, as the Sydney Symphony Orchestra, the Pittsburgh Symphony Orchestra or the Cleveland Orchestra have travelled to Merano.

Over the years, many word premieres of works commissioned by the festival have been played in the Kursaal. In 2001, composer Arnaldo de Felice, together with Edward Rushton, won first prize in a opera competition organized by the Bavarian State Opera at the Zurich Opera House. In 2002, the St. Petersburg Hermitage Symphony Orchestra premiered his piece Angoli d'ombra, a commission from the südtirol festival merano. meran in the Kursaal. In 2005, the festival presented three works by the Ladin composer Eduard Demez, of which one was a premiere of the commissioned work "Im Kland Verwandlung Coppia" with the Bruckner Orchestra Linz conducted by Dennis Russell Davies. For the 40th edition of the festival, British composer Rachel Portman was commissioned to compose a work, which was premiered in 2025 at the Kursaal by the LGT Young Soloists.

=== colours of music ===
The colours of music series was launched in 2002 at the Merano City Theatre. Over the years, the stage of the Art Nouveau building, with around 320 seats, has hosted performances by Indian percussionist Trilok Gurtu, pianist Uri Caine, percussionist Martin Grubinger, the Modern String Quarter, guitarist Tommy Emmanuel, piano virtuoso Omar Sosa, south african jazz legend Abdullah Ibrahim and pianist Michael Wollny with his trio.

=== mattineé classique ===
The mattineé classique series takes place either in the Pavillion des Fleurs or the Merano City Theatre. The concert format includes literary-musical event at saturday mornings souch as those with Bruno Ganz, Klaus Maria Brandauer, Daniel Hope, Sebastian Knauer or Peter Simonischek. in 2021, 100 years after Franz Kafkas stay in Merano, Krista Posch read from his letters to Milena Jesenskà, which he wrote in the spa town.

=== vox humana ===
The concerts of the vocal series vox humana take place in the churches and castles surrounding Merano.

=== barocco ===
The series barocco presents various Baroque works from the 17th and 18th centuries at various locations.

=== Mystica ===
The mystica series, existing since 2019, takes place primarily in sacred locations and churches in and around Merano.

=== young artists portrait ===
With the series young artists portrait, the festival presents string quartets that perform at several venues with different programs and are available for discussions with the audience after the concerts.
