= Kurhaus =

Kurhaus (German for "spa house" or "health resort") may refer to:

- Kurhaus of Baden-Baden in Germany
- Kurhaus, Wiesbaden in Germany
- Kurhaus, Meran in South Tyrol, Italy
- Kurhaus of Scheveningen in the Netherlands
- Kurhaus Bergün, a grand hotel
