= Emma (1996 soundtrack) =

Emma (Original Score)

Film score by Rachel Portman
- Released: 29 July 1996
- Recorded: 1996
- Studios: AIR Lyndhurst Hall, AIR, London
- Genre: Film score
- Length: 42:45
- Label: Hollywood
- Producer: Rachel Portman

Rachel Portman chronology
| Marvin's Room (1996) | Emma (Original Score) (1996) | Beauty and the Beast: The Enchanted Christmas (1997) |

Emma (Original Score) is the soundtrack accompanying the 1996 film of the same name based on Jane Austen's 1816 novel. It features the original score written by British composer Rachel Portman and released through Hollywood Records on 29 July 1996. At the 69th Academy Awards, Portman won the Best Original Musical or Comedy Score, thereby becoming the first woman to win the Academy Award.

== Development ==
Portman told Rebecca Jones from the BBC that her score was "purely classical". She continued "It is an orchestral piece, by which I mean that there is nothing in it that you wouldn't find in a symphony orchestra. It was influenced by my roots and my classical background." Portman used various instruments to give a voice to the characters. She revealed that "a quivering violin" would represent Harriet's uneasy stomach, while "a bittersweet clarinet" would accompany Emma though her emotional journey.

== Reception ==
Josh Friedman from the Los Angeles Times believed Portman's "crafty score guides the audience through the heroine's game playing, and ultimately, to her romantic destiny." He also thought the music had "a sneaky, circular feel". Playbill's Ken LaFave commented that the score "underlined the period romanticism" in Emma and contained a "string-rich, romantic sound". Jason Ankeny, a music critic for Allmusic, wrote that Portman's score to Emma employed all of her "signatures" like "whimsical yet romantic melodies, fluffy string arrangements, and woodwind solos", which would be familiar to anyone who had listened to her previous film scores. He stated, "it seems as if she's simply going through the motions, content to operate within the confines of an aesthetic that, admittedly, is hers and hers alone. By no means a bad score, Emma is nevertheless a disappointment – if you've heard a previous Rachel Portman score, you've pretty much heard this one as well." Christian Clemmensen of Filmtracks.com was critical of the film's music, adding that "Emma is far from her best work, and by no means deserved an Oscar over her other, stronger romance scores."

== Track listing ==
Emma (Original Score) track listing
| No. | Title | Length |
|---|---|---|
| 1. | "Main Titles" | 4:26 |
| 2. | "Harriet's Portrait" | 1:10 |
| 3. | "Sewing and Archery" | 3:07 |
| 4. | "Frank Churchill Arrives" | 2:29 |
| 5. | "Celery Root" | 2:55 |
| 6. | "Mr. Elton's Rejection" | 1:58 |
| 7. | "Emma Tells Harriet About MrElton" | 1:05 |
| 8. | "The Coles Party" | 3:10 |
| 9. | "Mrs. Elton's Visit" | 1:32 |
| 10. | "Emma Dreams of Frank Churchill" | 0:49 |
| 11. | "The Dance" | 1:17 |
| 12. | "Gypsies" | 0:46 |
| 13. | "The Picnic" | 2:29 |
| 14. | "Emma Insults Miss Bates" | 1:59 |
| 15. | "Emma Writes Her Diary" | 2:53 |
| 16. | "Mr. Knightley Returns" | 1:57 |
| 17. | "Proposal" | 4:22 |
| 18. | "End Titles" | 4:21 |
| Total length: | | 42:45 |

== Personnel ==
Credits adapted from liner notes.

- Composer, producer and orchestrator – Rachel Portman
- Conductor – David Snell
- Contractor – George Hamer
- Orchestra leader – Peter Manning
- Engineer – Keith Grant
- Flute – Linda Coffin
- Harp – Hugh Webb
- Clarinet – Nicholas Bucknall

== Accolades ==
Accolades for Emma (Original Score)
| Award | Category | Recipients | Result |
|---|---|---|---|
| Academy Awards | Best Original Musical or Comedy Score | Rachel Portman | Won |
