= Theater Lübeck =

Theatre and opera house in Lübeck, Germany

Coordinates: 53°52′11″N 10°41′11″E

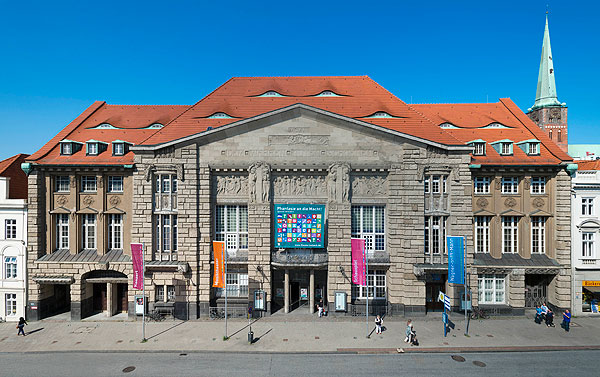
Theater Lübeck

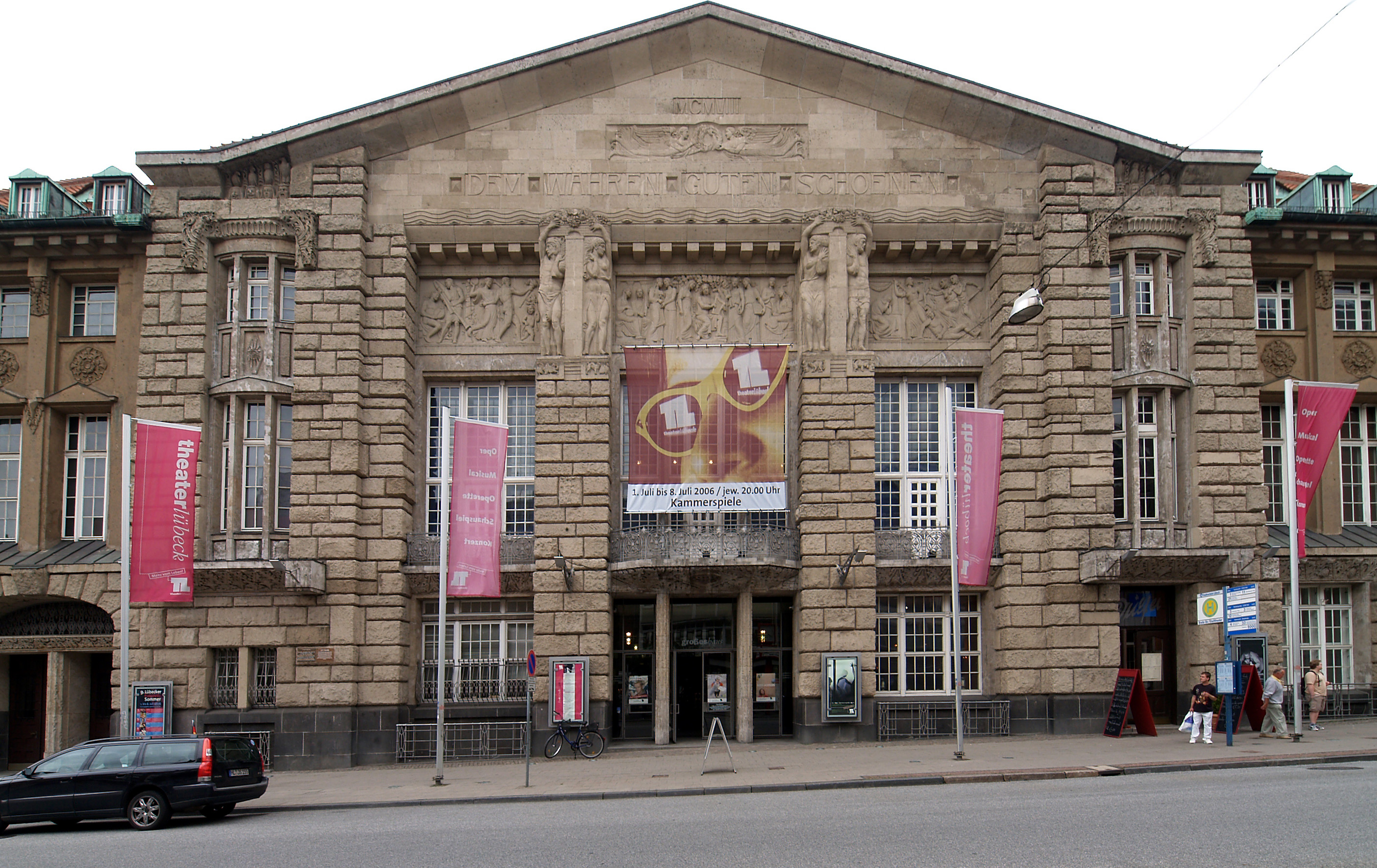
The Art Nouveau facade

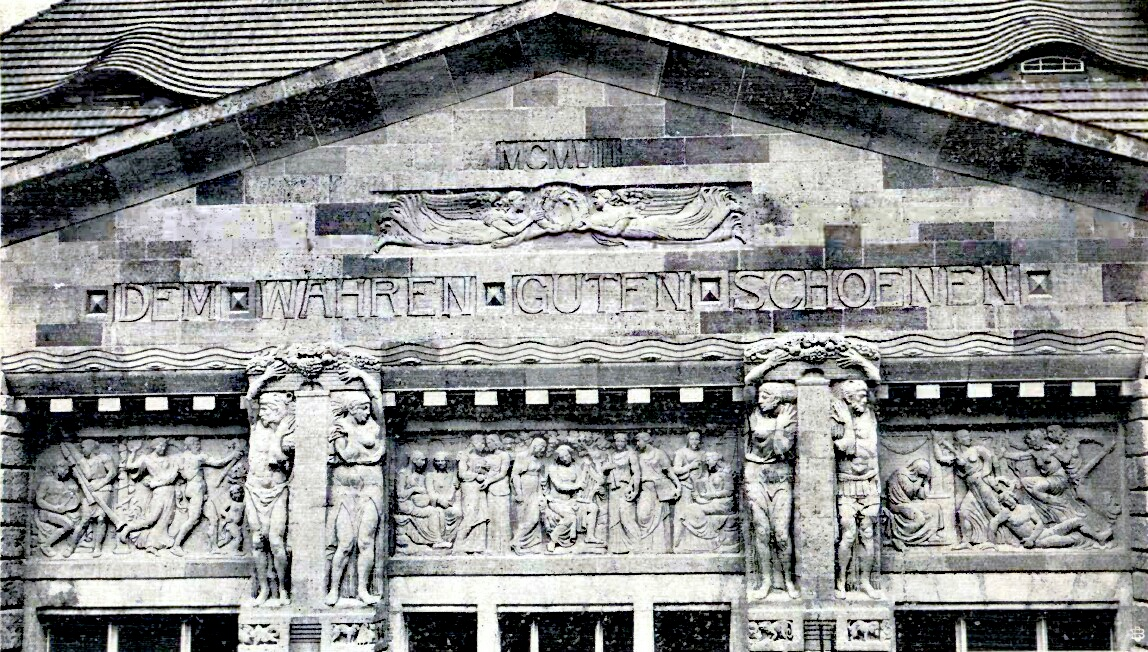
Relief of the facade

The Theater Lübeck (formerly Stage of the Hansestadt Lübeck, colloquially Stadttheater) is one of the largest theaters in the German state of Schleswig-Holstein. It is managed by Theater Lübeck GmbH, a state-owned company of the Hansestadt Lübeck.

Public interest in theatrical works and opera arose in Lübeck in the early days of the Age of Enlightenment and the first opera production in the city took place on 2 June 1746 in the house of master craftsman Schröder Ecke on the Königstraße. The predecessor of the current building dates from 1752. The transition of the company to the city in the 19th century is described by Thomas Mann in his novel Buddenbrooks.

Prominent conductors that began their careers in Lübeck include Hermann Abendroth, Wilhelm Furtwängler and Christoph von Dohnányi.

== Structure ==
The Theater was built in 1908 in the Art Nouveau style, on the site of an 18th-century theater on the Beckergrube in Lübeck's Old City. It was designed by Martin Dülfer and construction was funded by local businessman and philanthropist Emil Possehl. The reliefs on the sandstone facade are the work of sculptor Georg Roemer. The relief in the center depicts Apollo and the Nine Muses, with Comedy and Tragedy represented on either side. The gable end supports depicting Caryatids and Atlas are the work of Hamburg plasterer Karl Weinberger. The facade and the entire building received a complete restoration in the 1990s.

Old theatre, Creators, The new theatre

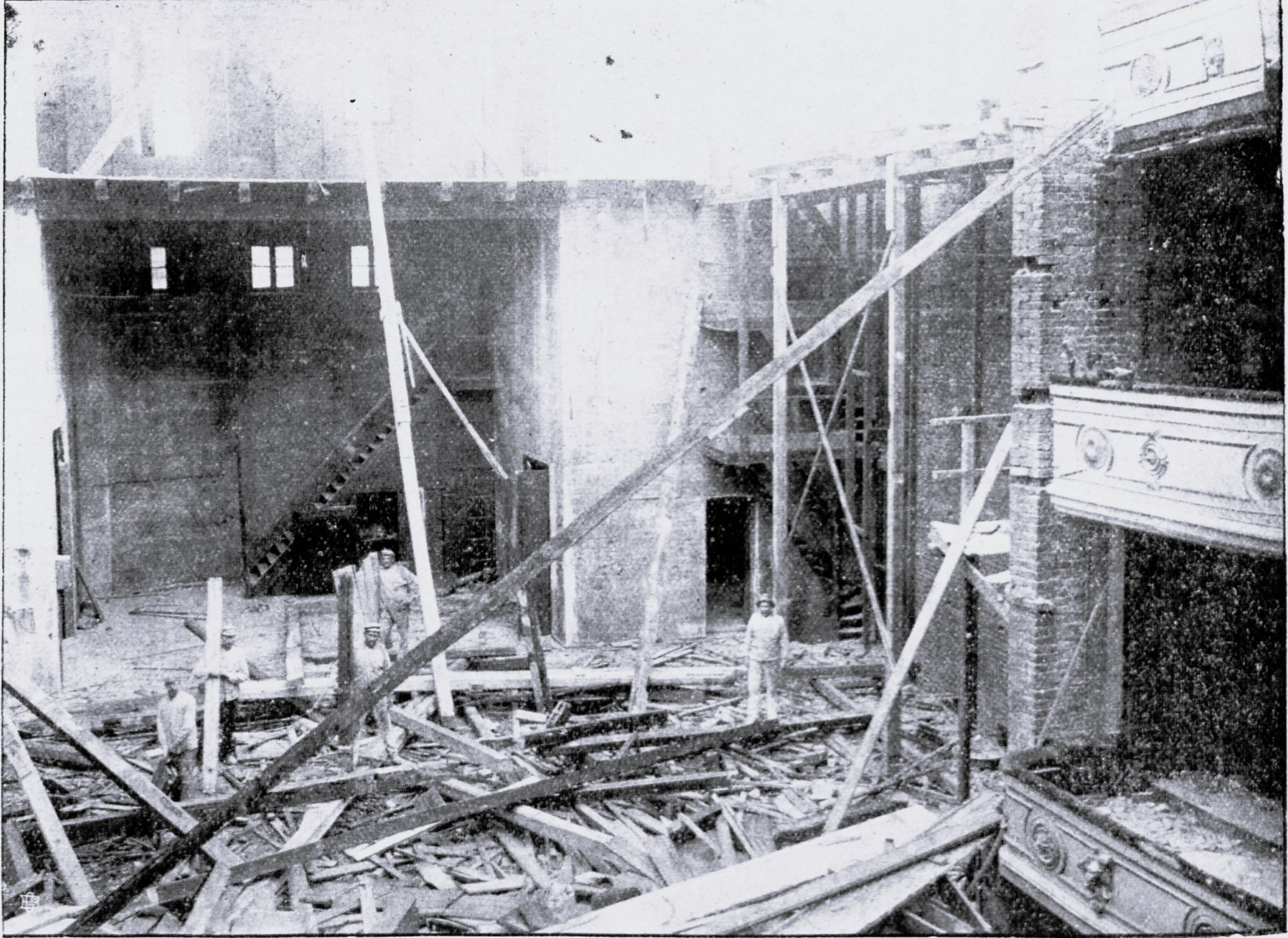
Old theater destroyed

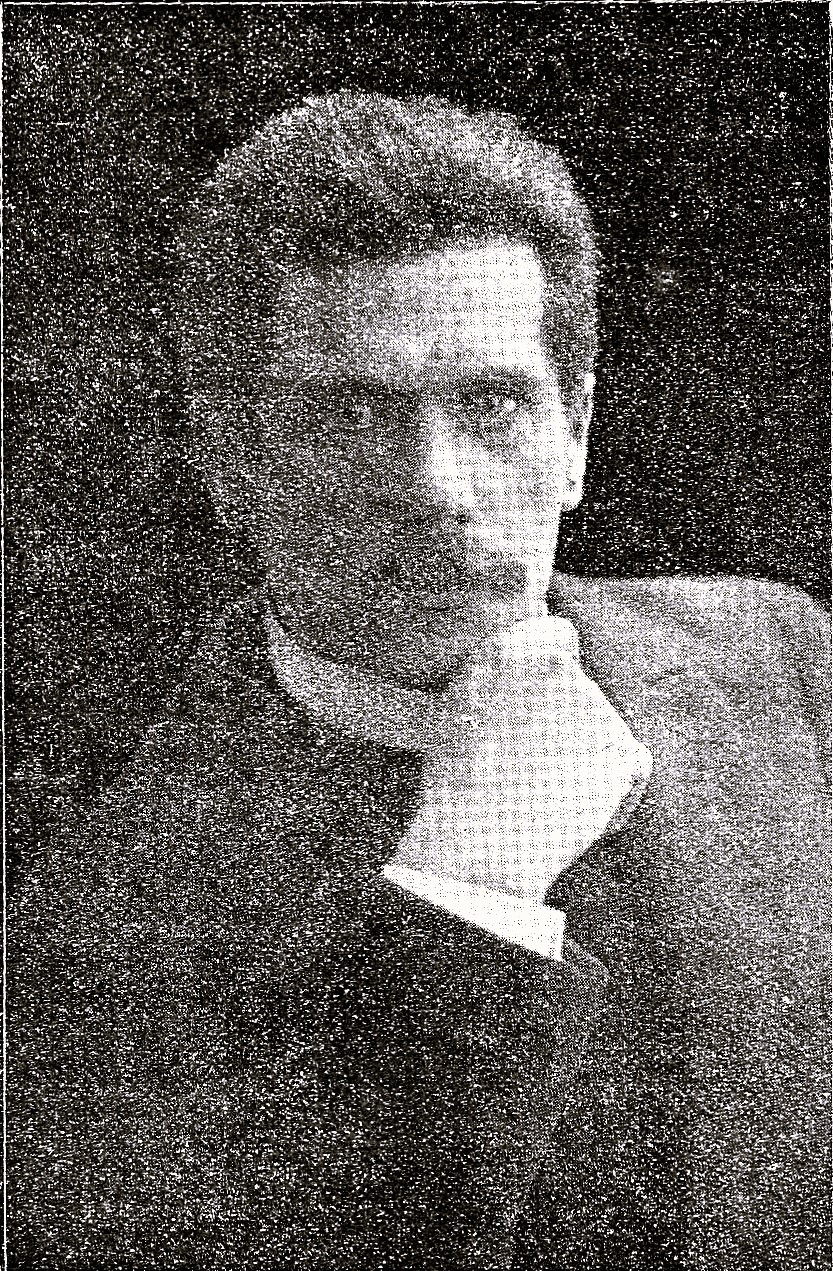
Professor Martin Dülfer from Dresden (Builder)

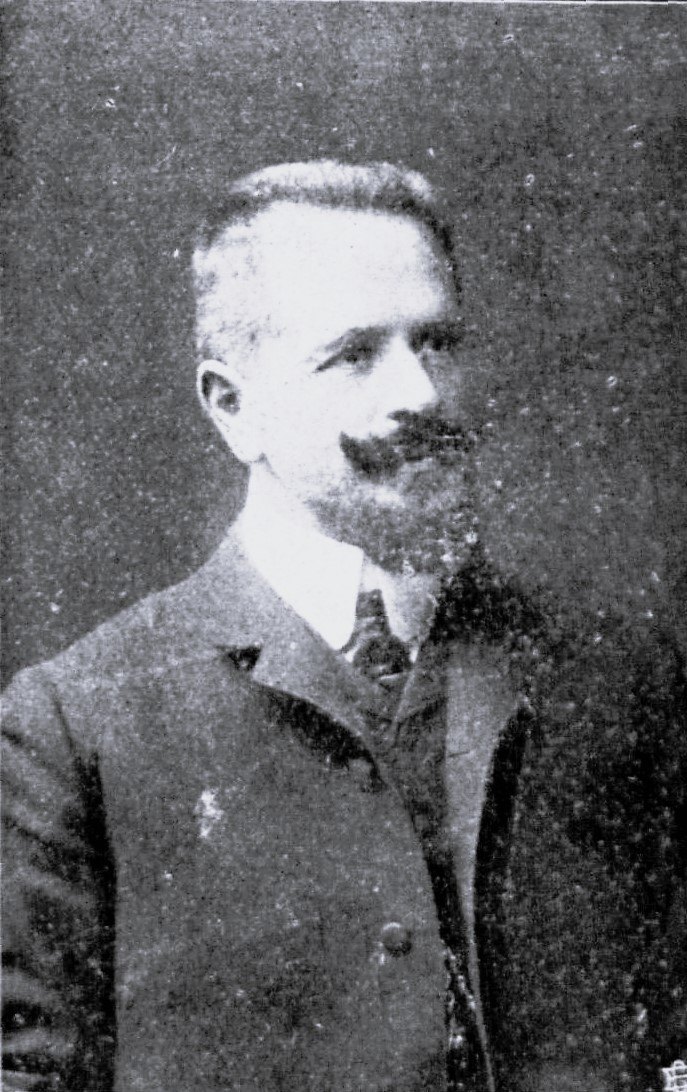
Architekt Max Baudrexel (Site manager)

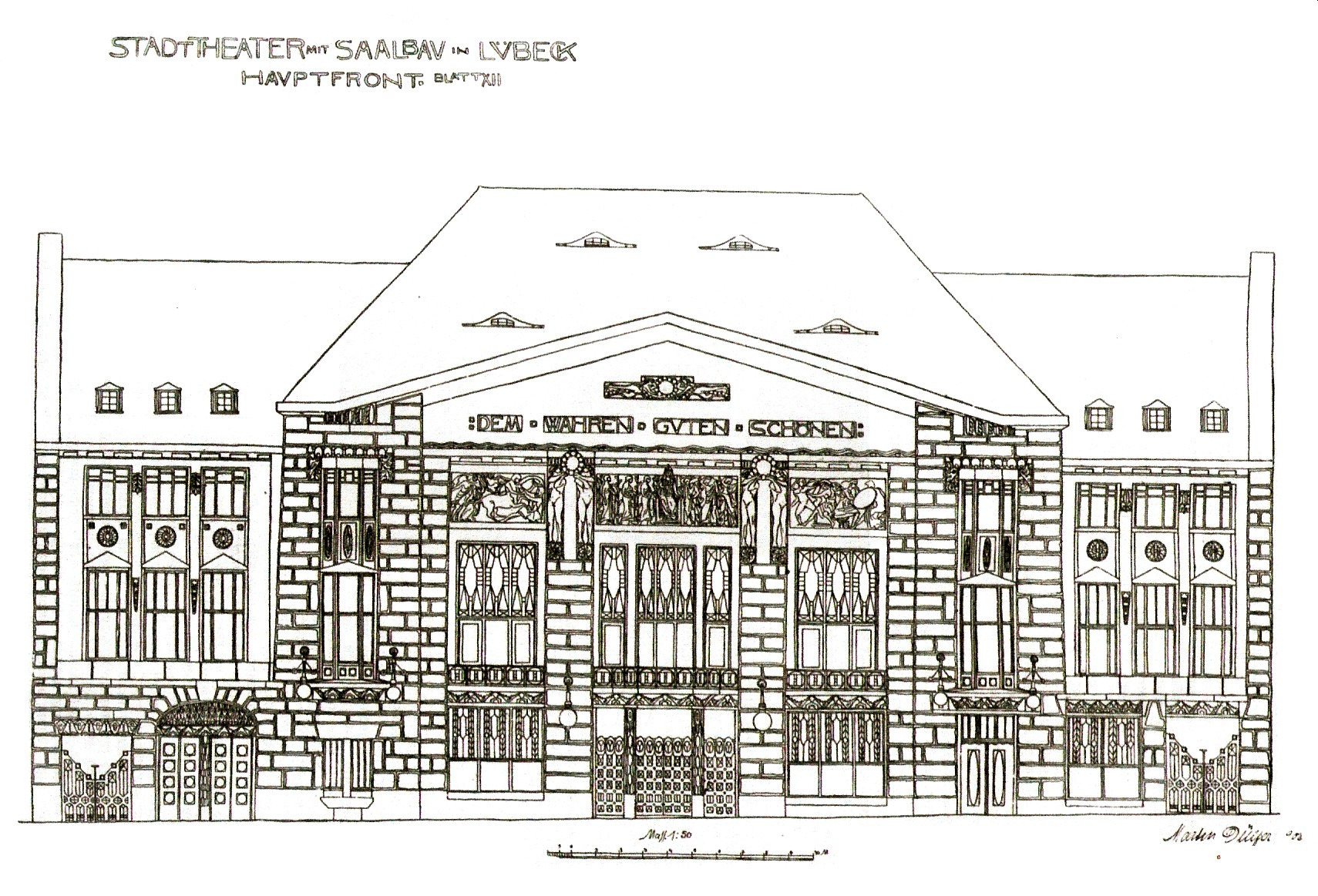
City hall with theater

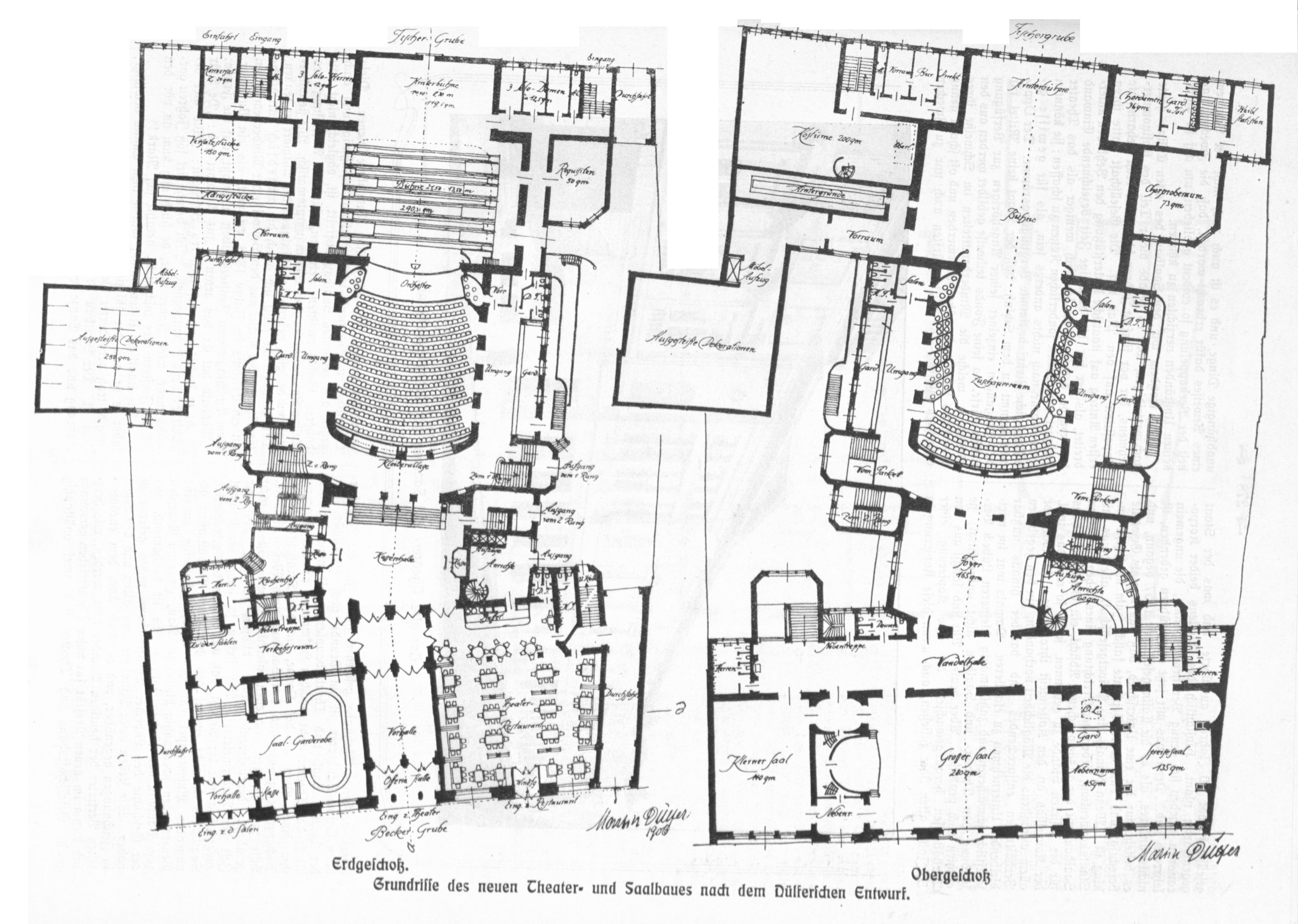
floorplans

== The theater today ==
The theater offerings include a variety of cultural activities, including opera, ballet, chamber music, and plays, as well as concerts of the Lübeck Philharmonic Orchestra.

The theater management has included Karl Vibach (1968–1978), Hans Thoenies (1978–1991), Dietrich von Oertzen (1991–2000) and Marc Adam (2000–2007). Since 2007 the theater has been managed by committee.

50% of the proceeds of Theater Lübeck GmbH go to the city of Lübeck. 12.5% each go to the regional governments of the surrounding districts of Herzogtum Lauenburg and Nordwestmecklenburg, the Chamber of Commerce ("Kaufmannschaft"), and the Gesellschaft der Theaterfreunde e. V. Lübeck (Friends of the Theater).
