= Never Let Me Go (soundtrack) =

Never Let Me Go (Original Motion Picture Soundtrack)

Film score by Rachel Portman
- Released: 14 September 2010
- Recorded: 2010
- Studios: Angel Recording Studios, London
- Genre: Film score
- Length: 41:34
- Label: Varèse Sarabande
- Producers: Rachel Portman; Chris Dibble; Yann McCullough

Rachel Portman chronology
| Grey Gardens (2009) | Never Let Me Go (2010) | His Way (2011) |

Never Let Me Go (Original Motion Picture Soundtrack) is the soundtrack to the 2010 film of the same name directed by Mark Romanek starring Carey Mulligan, Andrew Garfield and Keira Knightley. The soundtrack featured musical score composed by Rachel Portman which was released on 14 September 2010 through Varèse Sarabande.

== Development ==
The film's score was composed by British composer Rachel Portman over a four-month period. She said that because of the film's sad themes, she wanted to "put some hope" and humanity into the music; it was important that there be a "real emotional heartbeat in the midst of this story." Believing that a "huge sweeping score" would not have fit the film, she instead worked with a smaller orchestra of no more than 48 players. The director and producers prodded her to try other approaches, so she considered using a child's voice, and what was described as a "big finale cue." In the end, they went for a simpler and more subtle approach. Stating that most of the score was written for piano, strings and harp, with solos for violin and cello, she called her score something of a "chamber piece". According to Portman, the use of a solo instrument, is like having a voice, that highlights the emotion. However, the violin she used for the score is played with virtually no vibrato, as she did not want it to sound sentimental. She notes that "for my own taste, I stay on the side of restraint, because I think it works better in film".

== Critical reception ==
Christian Clemmensen of Filmtracks.com wrote "This score doesn't attempt to infuse any sense of gravity to the plot, a flaw that dutifully matches that of the film. As such, this is pleasant background ambience and really nothing more." Peter Debruge of Variety described it as "effectively grief-inducing" and Michael Phillips of Chicago Tribune called it as "aggressively fraught". In contrast, Mark Jenkins of NPR called it as "strident" and one of the "few outright blunders". Alexandra Coghlan of The Arts Desk wrote "Rachel Portman’s score – all wistful, unresolved string meanderings and tinkly atmospherics – says it all." Ed Gonzalez of Slant Magazine called the score as "obnoxiously persistent" and "something close to a pop standard".

== Track listing ==
Never Let Me Go (Original Motion Picture Soundtrack) track listing
| No. | Title | Length |
|---|---|---|
| 1. | "The Pier" | 2:04 |
| 2. | "Main Titles" | 3:00 |
| 3. | "Bumper Crop" | 3:07 |
| 4. | "To the Cottages" | 1:38 |
| 5. | "The Boat" | 1:51 |
| 6. | "Madame Is Coming" | 2:25 |
| 7. | "Ruth's Betrayal" | 2:49 |
| 8. | "Making Tea" | 1:14 |
| 9. | "Evening Visit" | 1:50 |
| 10. | "Kathy and Tommy" | 2:04 |
| 11. | "Kathy Watches Behind Screen" | 1:38 |
| 12. | "Life as a Carer" | 1:15 |
| 13. | "Kingsfield Recovery Centre" | 1:40 |
| 14. | "Unseen Tides" | 1:46 |
| 15. | "The Worst Thing I Ever Did" | 1:46 |
| 16. | "Souls At All" | 2:50 |
| 17. | "We All Complete" | 5:06 |
| 18. | "Halisham School Song" | 0:48 |
| 19. | "Never Let Me Go" | 2:43 |
| Total length: | | 41:34 |

== Personnel ==
Credits adapted from AllMusic

- Composer – Rachel Portman
- Producer – Chris Dibble, Rachel Portman, Yann McCullough
- Recording engineer – Chris Dibble
- Assistant recording engineer – Jeremy Murphy
- Mastering – Chris Dibble
- Music editor – Yann McCullough
- Music supervisors – George Drakoulias, Randall Poster
- Auricle control systems – Chris Cozens
- Executive producer – Robert Townson
- Musical assistance – Karen Westropp, Youki Yamanoto
- Music business affairs – Tom Cavanaugh
- Executive in charge of music – Robert Kraft

Orchestra

- Orchestrators – Jeff Atmajian, Rachel Portman
- Conductor – David Snell
- Contractor – George Hamer
- Music co-ordinator – Rebecca Morellato
- Copyist – Colin Rae

Instruments

- Cello – Paul Watkins
- Harp – Hugh Webb
- Piano – Helen Crayford
- Violin – Marcia Crayford

== Accolades ==
| Award | Date of ceremony | Category | Recipients | Result |
|---|---|---|---|---|
| San Diego Film Critics Society | 14 December 2010 | Best Score | Rachel Portman | Won |
