= Orazio Gaigher =

Austrian-Italian painter and illustrator

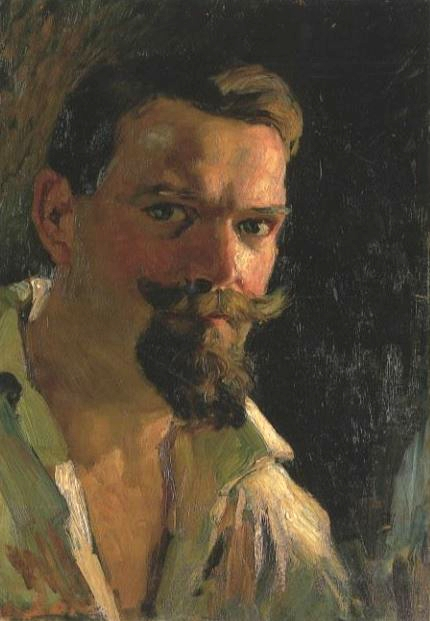
Self-portrait (date unknown)

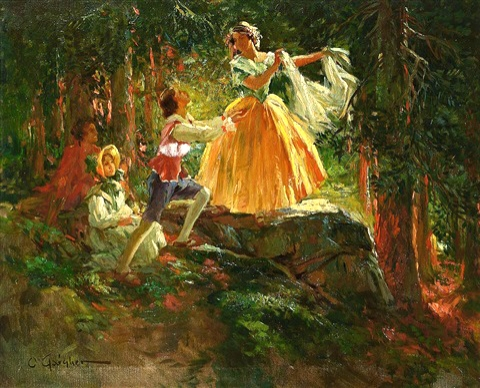
A Theatrical Company in the Forest

Orazio Gaigher, also known as Horatius (20 April 1870, Levico Terme – 17 May 1938, Merano), was an Austrian-Italian painter and illustrator.

== Biography ==
He studied medicine in Innsbruck and, after being awarded his degree, became a general practitioner in Salzburg. During those years, he taught himself how to paint, as a hobby.

The painter, Hubert von Herkomer, was one of his patients and, in 1901, suggested that he give up being a doctor and come with him to London, where he could put his talents to good use. He also travelled with Herkomer to Spain, and was especially impressed by the works of Diego Velázquez.

In Paris, he studied with Jules-Joseph Lefebvre, Tony Robert-Fleury and Eugène Carrière. In 1907, he moved to Rome. Later, he divided his time between Madonna di Campiglio, in the summer, and Merano, in the winter.

In 1915, his portraits of Popes Pius X and Benedict XV won a gold medal at the Panama–Pacific International Exposition in San Francisco. From 1928 to 1930, he undertook a painting expedition to Patagonia.

In addition to portraits, genre scenes and landscapes, he created some altarpieces, etched bookplates and did decorative work at the Kurhaus in Merano.

Sixteen of his drawings were used to illustrate a medical text, Die Bruchoperation nach Bassini (The Fracture Operation According to Bassini) by Attilio Catterina, published by Urban & Schwarzenberg in Berlin (1933).

== Sources ==
- (in German) Dankmar Trier: Gaigher, Orazio. In: Allgemeines Künstlerlexikon. Die Bildenden Künstler aller Zeiten und Völker (AKL). Band 47, Saur, München u. a. 2005, ISBN 3-598-22787-6, S. 276 f.
- Heinrich Hammer: "Gaigher, Horazio". In: Ulrich Thieme (Ed.): Allgemeines Lexikon der Bildenden Künstler von der Antike bis zur Gegenwart. Vol.13: Gaab–Gibus. E. A. Seemann, Leipzig 1920, pg.73 Online
- Fiorenzo Degasperi (Ed.): Orazio Gaigher: 1870–1938. Exhibition catalog. Trient: Il Castello, 1996
