= Karl von Großheim =

German architect (1841–1911)

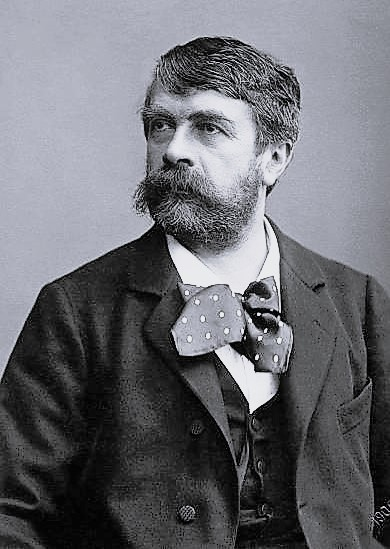
Karl von Großheim (c.1900)

Karl Friedrich Ernst von Großheim (15 October 1841, Lübeck - 5 February 1911, Bad Rippoldsau) was a German architect and President of the Prussian Academy of Arts.

== Life and work ==
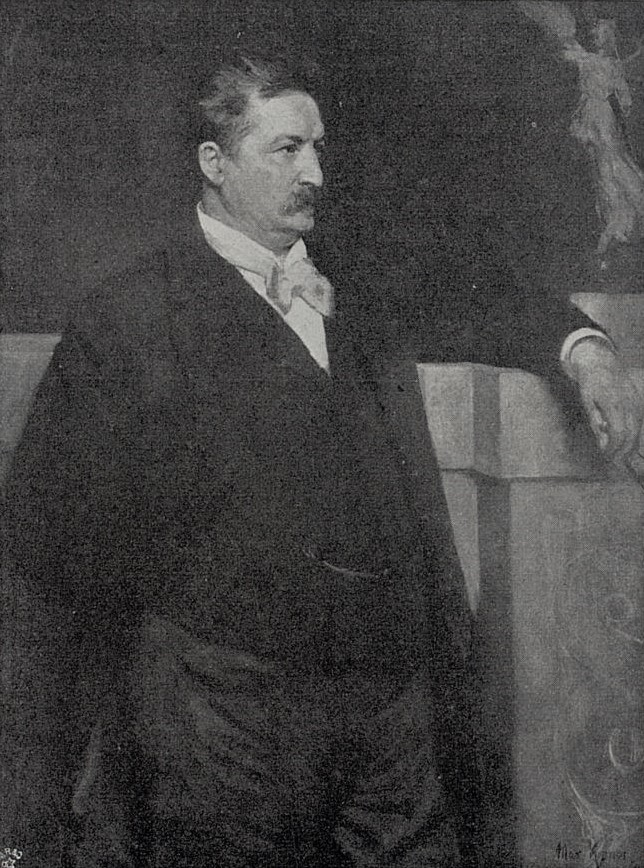
Heinrich Kayser; portrait by Max Koner (1899)

He began his education at the Großheimsche Realschule, founded by his grandfather, Carl Friedrich Christian von Großheim. After graduating, at the age of sixteen, he went on to a three-year apprenticeship as a carpenter. He worked as a journeyman in Altona, then sought to continue his education at the Bauakademie in Berlin, with the goal of becoming an architect. For a time he worked with Hermann von der Hude. At the academy, he made the acquaintance of his future partner, Heinrich Joseph Kayser, while both were attending a life drawing course taught by Carl Steffeck. He passed his state examination in 1860.

He and Kayser worked for August Orth from 1867 to 1870. The following year, they established their own firm; "Kayser und v. Großheim". They first attracted notice in 1872, when they came in second to Ludwig Bohnstedt in a competition to design the new Reichstag Building. The winning design was never used.

Their studio became one of the leading architectural firms of the period. Most of their work was in a Neo-Renaissance style. Although certain individual stylistic elements are detectable, they always took joint credit for their designs. As their business grew, they opened branches in Bonn and Düsseldorf; the latter managed by Max Wöhler, who would become a full partner in 1899. Later, they created works in the Neo-Baroque style.

Numerous architects received training in their studios, including Martin Dülfer, who would become famous as a designer of theatres. Both were awarded the title of "Geheimrat" and received honorary professorships. They were also members of the Prussian Academy of Building and "Senators" on the governing board of the Prussian Academy of Arts. In 1879, Großheim was one of the founding members of the Association of Berlin Architects. He became a member of the Arts Academy in 1880, and served as its President for a brief period from 1910 until his death.

His funeral was attended by the Minister of Culture, August von Trott zu Solz, representing Emperor Wilhelm II, who had ordered that the funeral procession be allowed to pass through the middle portal of the Brandenburg Gate; an honor that was usually reserved for princes and other members of the higher nobility.

In his honor, the city of Lübeck created the Von-Großheim-Platz in der Vorstadt St. Jürgen, near his parents' home, in a field that had been left fallow for many years. It included a fountain made of muschelkalk, and adorned with a portrait relief made by the sculptor, Ludwig Manzel. During World War II, the lawn was converted to a pond. In 1990, the pond was removed and the fountain fully restored.

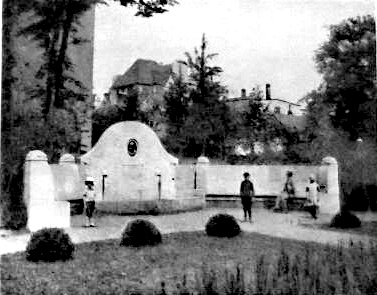
Karl von Großheim Fountain in Lübeck
