= Martin Dülfer =

German architect

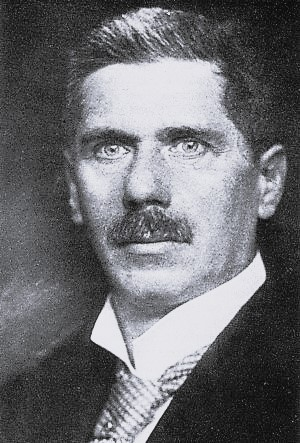
Martin Dülfer (date unknown)

Martin Dülfer (1 January 1859 in Breslau – 21 December 1942 in Dresden) was a German architect and professor; best known for designing theatres in the Historical and Art-Nouveau styles.

== Life and work ==
His father, Carl Dülfer, was a publisher and book dealer. After completing his secondary education, he attended a trade school in Schweidnitz. Then, from 1877 to 1879, he studied at the Polytechnic School in Hannover, with Conrad Wilhelm Hase and, from 1879 to 1880, at the Technischen Hochschule in Stuttgart with Christian Friedrich von Leins. Following a brief period of military service, he took a position at the Berlin offices of Heinrich Joseph Kayser and Karl von Großheim. He completed his studies from 1885 to 1886, at the Technical Hochschule München, with Friedrich von Thiersch.

His own independent career began in 1887; creating designs in the prevailing Neo-Baroque style. Around 1900, he turned to Art-Nouveau; designing mostly apartments and commercial buildings. During this period, he built his first theatre, in Meran, soon followed by four more. Several other designs were created for project competitions, some of which received first place, but they were never implemented due to financial or political issues.

He married Käte Weigand in 1893. The marriage remained childless, but they adopted a nine-year-old boy in 1915. He also admitted to fathering an illegitimate daughter in 1905, during a visit to the United States.

In 1902, he was awarded the honorary title of "Royal Bavarian Professor". Four years later, he was appointed to succeed Karl Weißbach as professor of building design at the Technische Hochschule Dresden (now TU Dresden). From 1912, he served as dean of the construction department then, from 1920 to 1921 as rector and, from 1921 to 1923, as Prorector. He was also a member of several professional associations, serving as chairman of the Association of German Architects. In 1909, he was one of the founding members of the Künstlervereinigung Dresden.

He was a recipient of the Order of the Crown, third-class, in 1911. The Technische Hochschule Dresden presented him with an honorary doctorate in 1913, and the Technische Hochschule in Charlottenburg (now Technische Universität Berlin) followed suit in 1928. He became a professor emeritus in 1929 and disappeared from public notice until 1939, when he was given the Goethe-Medaille für Kunst und Wissenschaft, despite the fact that he was a Freemason and therefore considered to be an "unreliable" person under Nazi cultural policy.

Three years later, he died. Käte was killed during the bombing of Dresden, at which time their home and estate, as well as his grave at the Alter Annenfriedhof, were also destroyed.

== Selected buildings ==
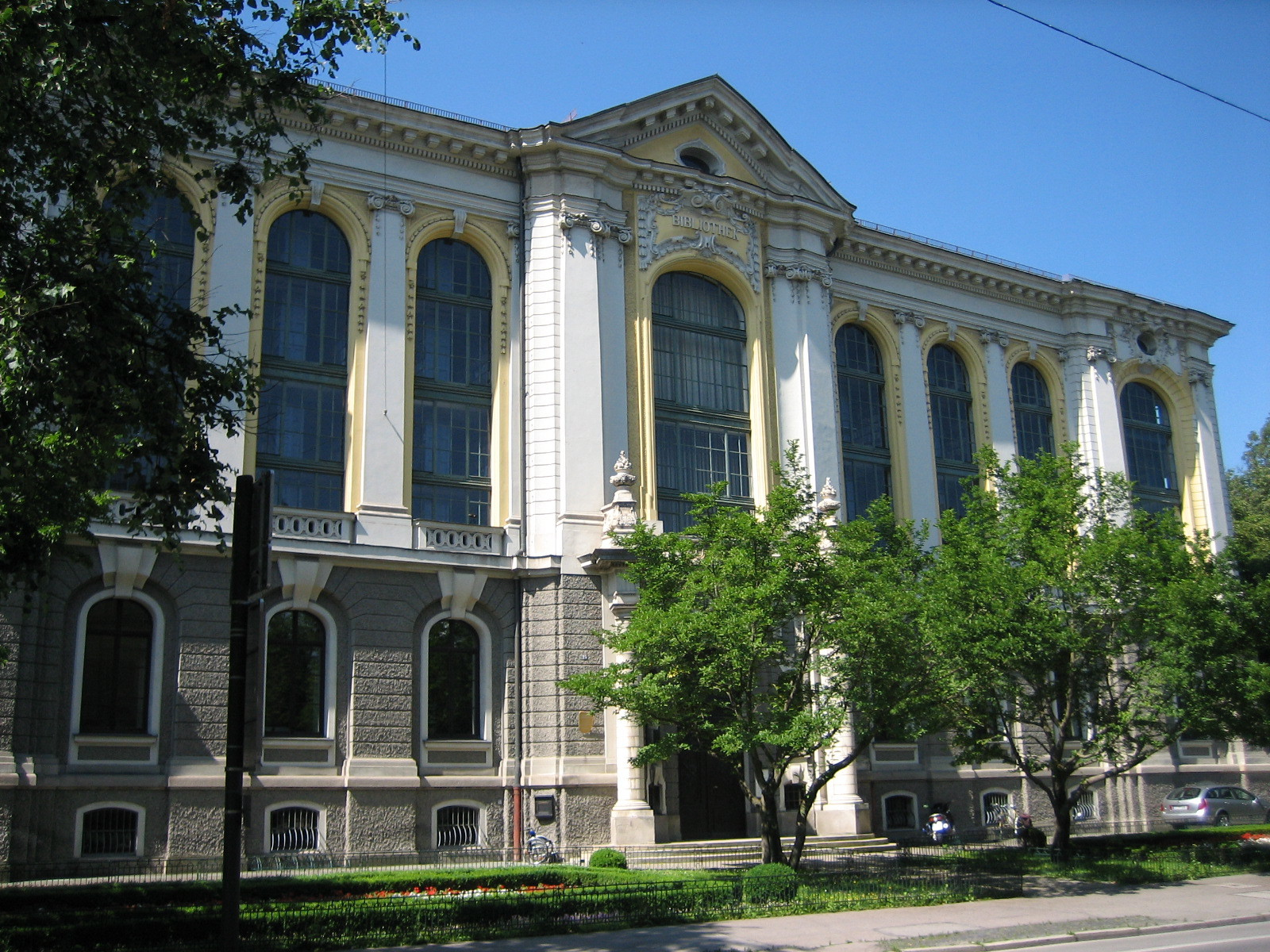
Staats- und Stadtbibliothek Augsburg (1893)

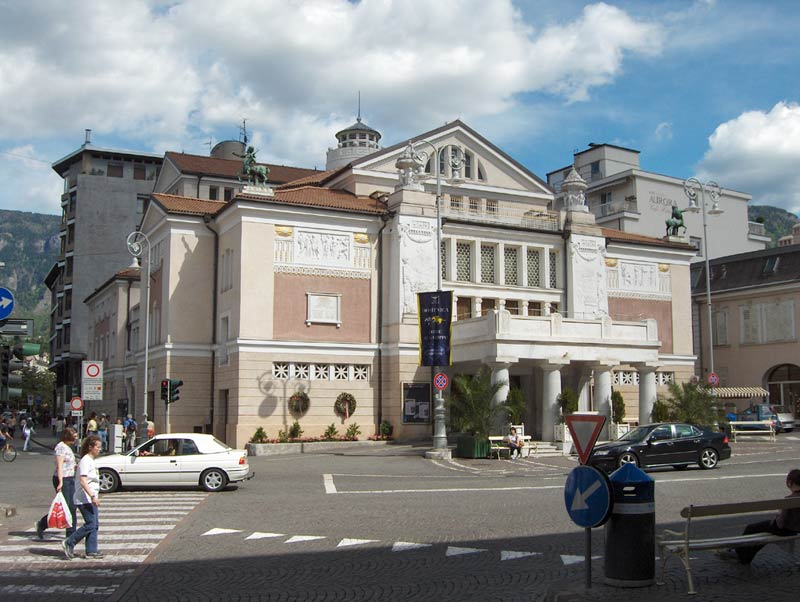
Stadttheater Meran (1899/1900)

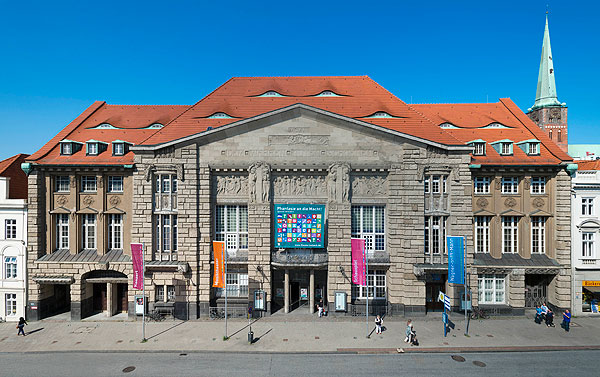
Theater Lübeck (1907/1908)

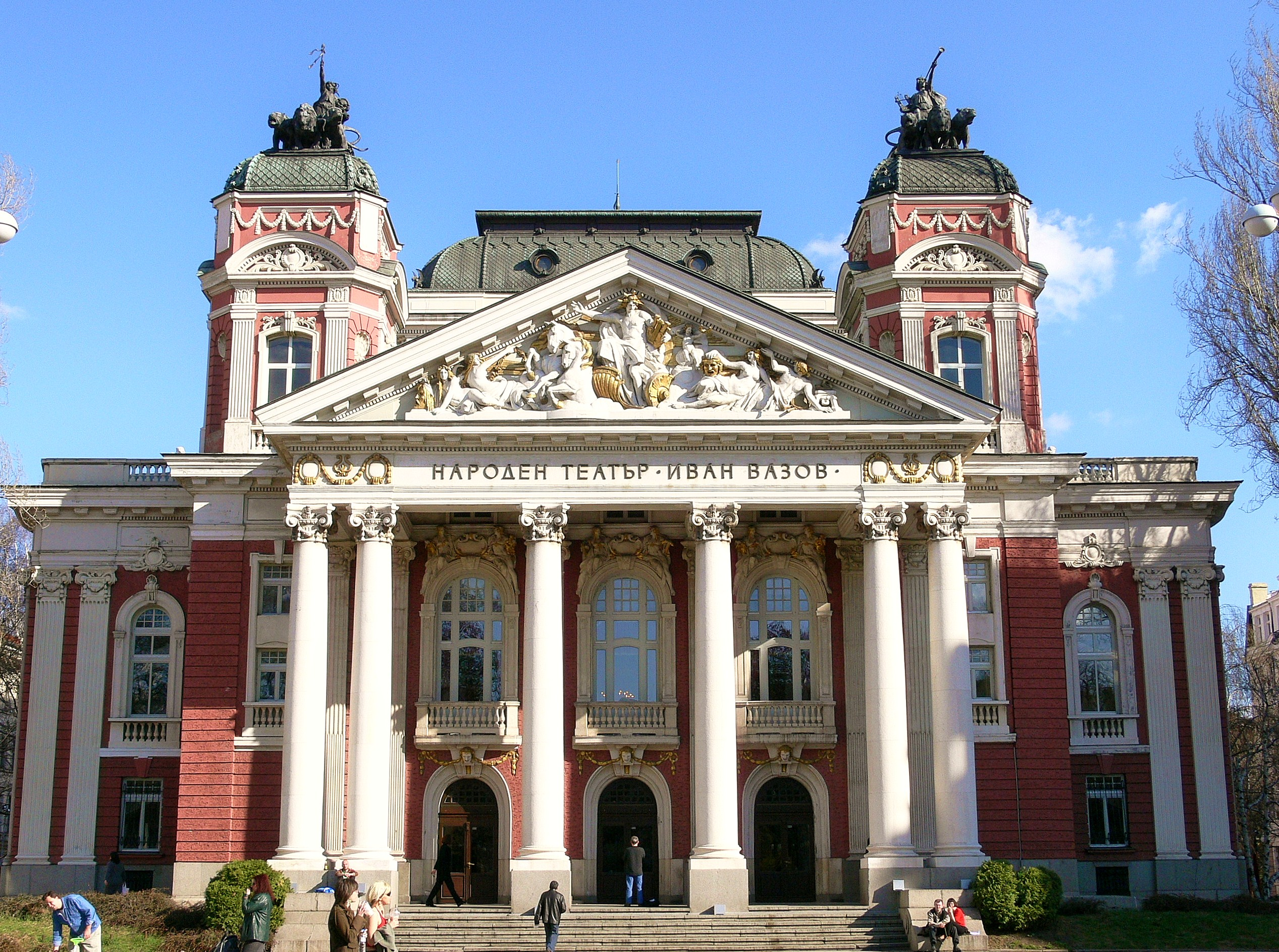
Ivan Vazov National Theatre, Sofia (1925/1929)

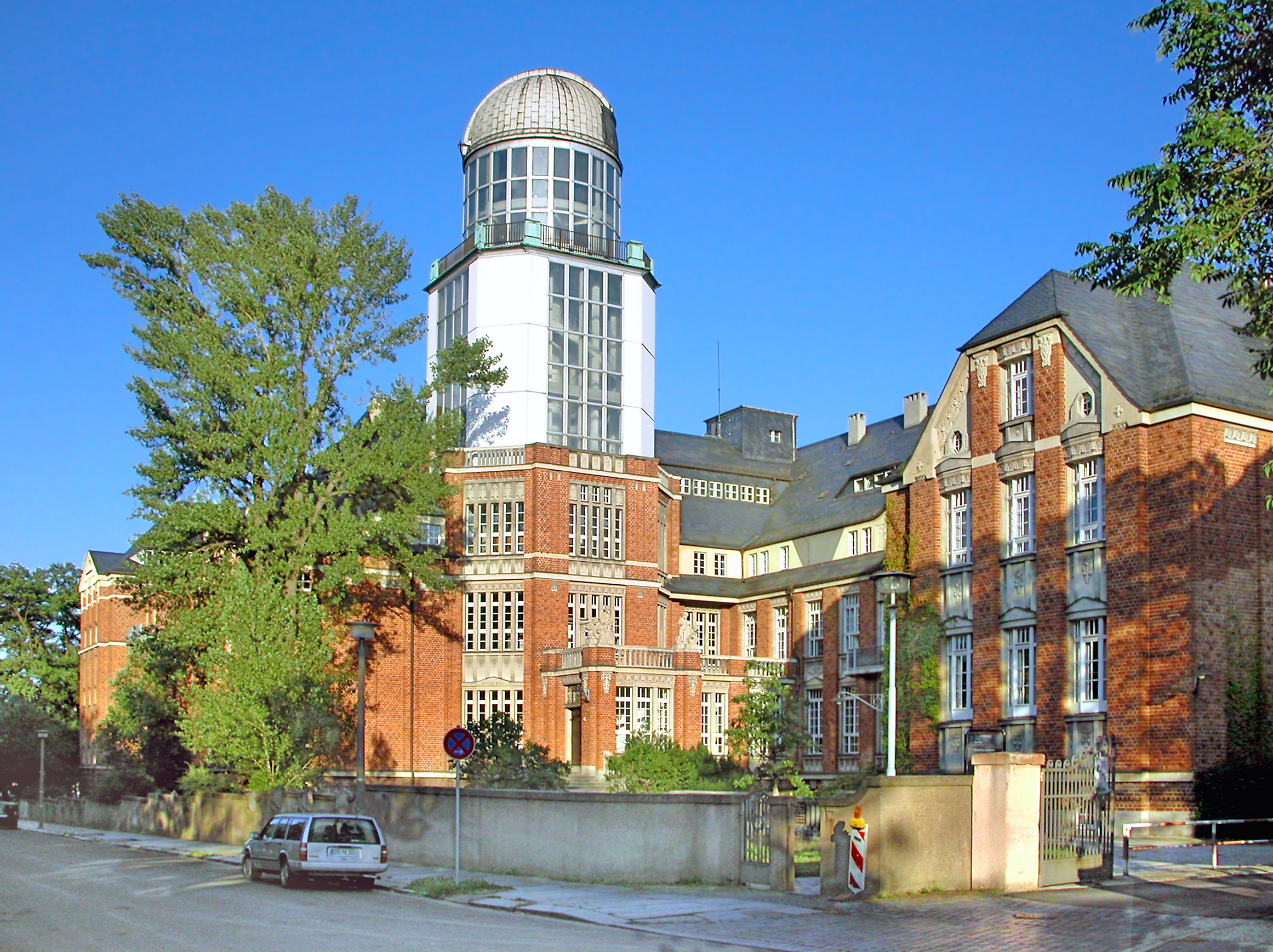
Beyer-Bau, TU Dresden (1910/1913)

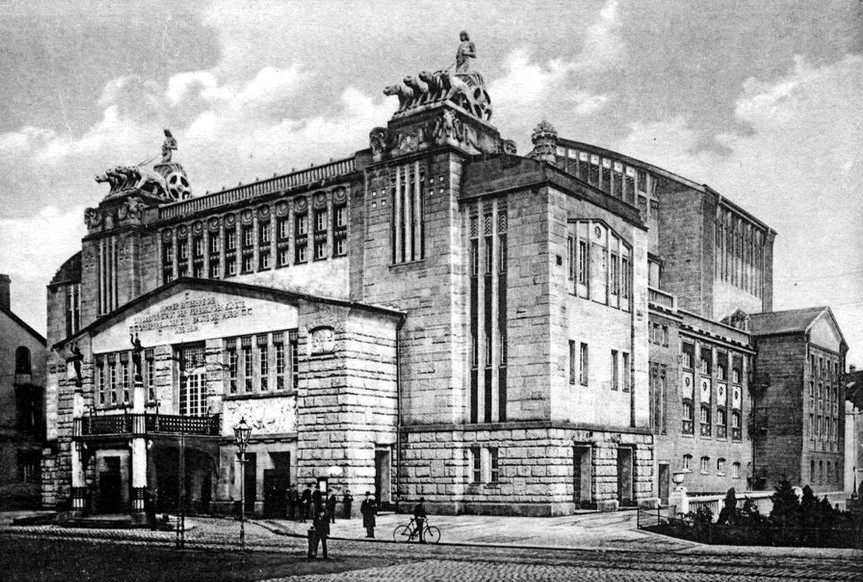
Theater Dortmund (1902/1904),
destroyed in World War II

== Sources ==
- Dieter Klein: Martin Dülfer. Wegbereiter der deutschen Jugendstilarchitektur. (Arbeitshefte des Bayerischen Landesamtes für Denkmalpflege, Vol.8.), 2nd edition, Verlag Lipp, Munich 1993, ISBN 3-87490-531-4
- Otto Schubert (1959). "Dülfer, Martin". Neue Deutsche Biographie (in German). Vol. 4. Berlin: Duncker & Humblot. pp. 159–160. (full text online).
