= Stadttheater Meran =

Theatre in Merano, Italy

Coordinates: 46.6706°N 11.1598°E

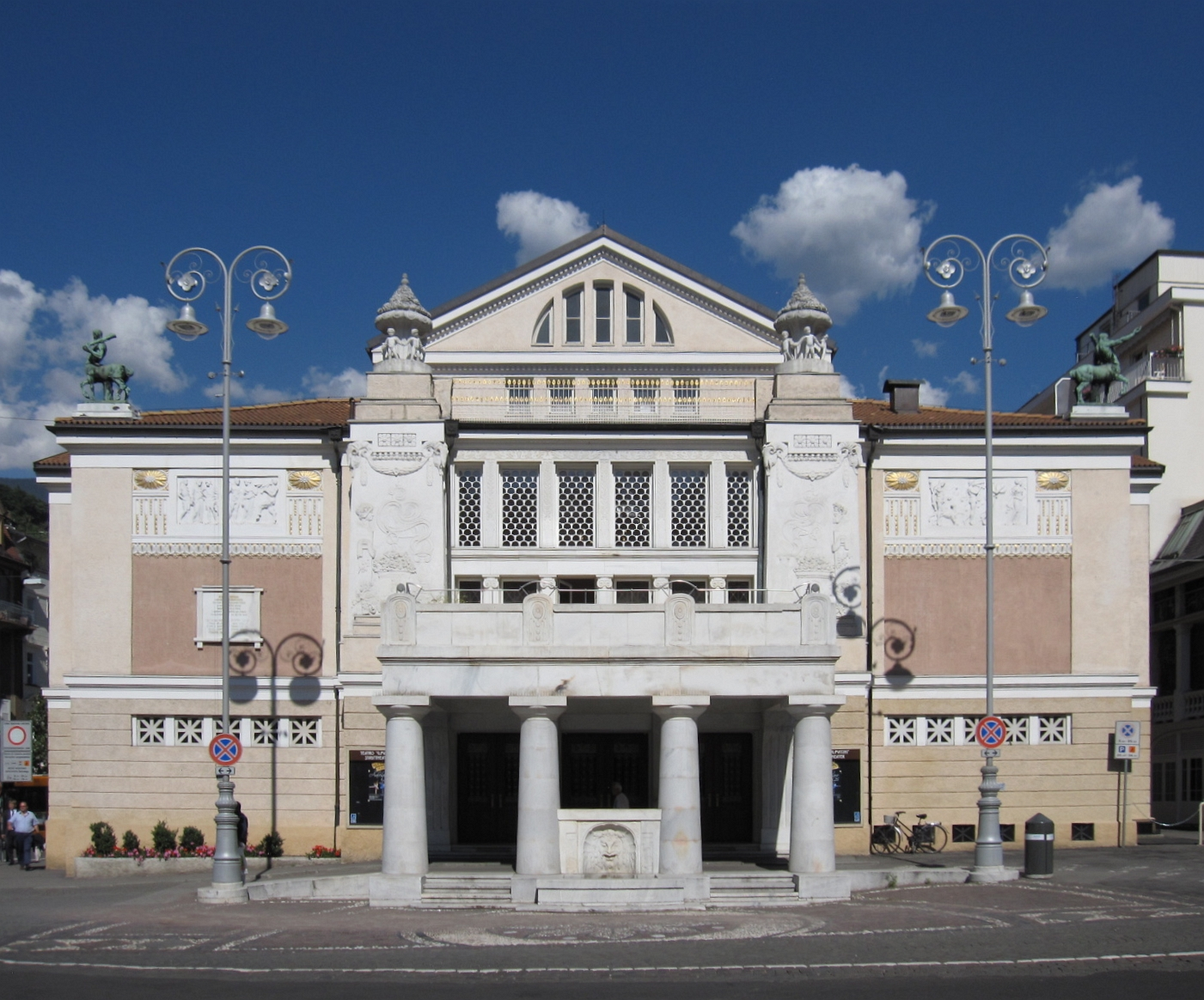
Stadttheater Meran

The Stadttheater Meran or Teatro Civico di Merano is the civic theatre of the town of Merano in South Tyrol, northern Italy.

With the economic and financial development of the city as a spa for Empress Elisabeth of Austria and the aristocracy, the need for a higher cultural institution rose. The architect Martin Dülfer, who was a representative of the Munich School of Architecture, was given the commission to build the new theatre. He designed the theatre in the Jugendstil. It was completed in 1899 and inaugurated on December 1, 1900.

After the annexation of the town following the end of World War I from Austria-Hungary to Italy was the theatre renamed by the Italians after Giacomo Puccini, who visited the town in 1923. The theatre saw its decline after World War II and the 1950s. It was, however, revived again and renovated after a fire in 1978.
