= Rachel Portman =

British composer (born 1960)

Rachel Portman OBE
- Born: Rachel Mary Berkeley Portman; 11 December 1960 (age 65); Haslemere, Surrey, England
- Education: Worcester College, Oxford
- Occupation: Composer
- Spouses: Uberto Pasolini (m. 1995; div. 2006) Andrew Gilchrist (m. 2021)
- Children: 3
- Website: rachelportman.co.uk

Rachel Mary Berkeley Portman (born 11 December 1960) is a British composer. She was the first female composer to win the Academy Award for Best Original Score (for Emma), and was nominated two further times (for The Cider House Rules and Chocolat). She has composed more than one hundred scores for film, television and theatre, and has collaborated with the BBC on several projects, including an opera based on The Little Prince and a choral symphony called The Water Diviner's Tale.

Portman's career in music began with writing music for drama in BBC and Channel 4 films such as Oranges Are Not the Only Fruit, Mike Leigh's Four Days in July and Jim Henson's Storyteller series.

She was appointed an Officer of the Order of the British Empire in 2010, and is an honorary member of Worcester College, Oxford. Portman is a Fellow of the Royal College of Music. She was made an honorary fellow in a ceremony at the RCM, where Prince Charles (now King Charles III), then President of the RCM, presented the award.

== Early life and education ==
Portman was born in Haslemere in Surrey, England, the daughter of Sheila Margaret Penelope (born Mowat) Portman and Berkeley Charles Berkeley Portman. She was educated at Charterhouse and became interested in music from a young age, beginning composing at the age of 14. Portman studied Music at Worcester College, Oxford, and composition with Roger Steptoe. It was there that her interest in composing music for films began, as she started experimenting with writing music for student films and theatre productions. She composed for Oxford Playhouse productions and made the soundtrack for a student film, Privileged, which was sold to the BBC.

== Compositions ==
Her first professional score was commissioned by David Puttnam, and was the soundtrack for the 1982 film Experience Preferred... But Not Essential. Later, she started to compose music for BBC and Channel 4 shows and movies, such as Oranges Are Not The Only Fruit, Four Days in July by Mike Leigh and The Storyteller by Jim Henson.

Since 1992 Rachel Portman has been in demand for Hollywood productions, and remains one of the few female composers to have achieved significant success at this level. In an interview, discussing the influence of her success to inspire women composers, she states: "I really haven’t ever thought of myself as a female composer, but rather as a composer. It never occurred to me I was one of the only women composers in film when I started out. There is still a huge imbalance in the industry when there are many, many greatly talented women composers of film music around now. I hope it becomes more and more the norm to see women credited as composers in film and TV in the future."

Portman has also written several concert and stage commissions including a musical of Little House on the Prairie. In 2003 her opera The Little Prince premiered at the Houston Grand Opera and has since been performed throughout the United States and recorded under the auspices of the BBC. Based on Antoine de Saint-Exupéry's novel of the same name, Portman's The Little Prince is one of relatively few operas intended for both children and adults. Characterized by cleanly etched vocal lines for boy soprano and lively children's choruses, the opera represents the composer's most ambitious work. She also premiered The Water Diviner's Tale (2007), a choral symphony inspired in climate change for the BBC Proms, and later, Endangered (2012), an orchestral piece commissioned by the National Centre for the Performing Arts (China) in Beijing for a concert on the occasion of the World Environment Day in 2013.

In 2019, Portman wrote Earth Song for the BBC Singers, with text by the poet Nick Drake and Greta Thunberg. She composed the soundtrack for the BBC1 Christmas special Mimi and the Mountain Dragon in 2019.

Between 2020 and 2025, Rachel Portman has continued to expand her musical repertoire across a variety of mediums, including film, television, stage, and concert compositions. In 2020, she released Ask the River (Node Records), a solo piano album, and scored Disney's Godmothered, directed by Sharon Maguire. The following year, her work featured in several notable projects: she contributed to Incidental: Music For The Stage, a charity album including a piece based on Dickens' A Tale of Two Cities; composed the score for the documentary Julia about Julia Child; and provided music for the United Nations Development Programme short film Don’t Choose Extinction. She also began a series of collaborations with Chevrolet, composing music for the advertisement Holiday Ride.

Portman’s output in subsequent years highlighted her versatility and ongoing interest in thematic and socially conscious work. In 2022, she composed The First Morning of the World for Joyce DiDonato’s album Eden, and returned to Chevrolet with Mrs. Hayes. 2023 saw the release of Beyond the Screen – Film Works on Piano (Sony Classical), and Tipping Points, a concerto for violin, orchestra, and voice featuring poems by Nick Drake performed by Niklas Liepe with WDR Funkhausorchester. She also scored another Chevrolet campaign, A Holiday to Remember. In 2024, she contributed There Will Be A Place for soprano Lucy Crowe, scored Hulu’s TV series We Were The Lucky Ones, and composed for the film The Return by Uberto Pasolini. That year also included a Christmas arrangement of Silent Night, performed at the Royal Albert Hall.

In 2025, Portman debuted several new compositions at major European festivals, including Dolomites for the Südtirol Festival Merano, Filmscapes for Flute and Orchestra for the Emilia-Romagna Festival, and The Gathering Tree for the Proms. She also expanded her collaboration with Joyce DiDonato in Another Eve, an extended version of her earlier piece. Her ongoing exploration of vocal and instrumental forms continued with singles such as Hannah's Song, Eventide, Moment In Time, and June. Kings College, Cambridge commissioned her to compose a carol for the 2025 Festival of Nine Lessons and Carols; she chose "The Darkling Thrush" by Thomas Hardy as the text.

== Awards and honours ==
Portman received the Anthony Asquith Award from the British Film Institute for her score for The Storyteller.

In 1996, she became the first female composer to win an Academy Award, which she received for the score of Emma. She was also the first female composer to win a Primetime Emmy Award, which she received for the film, Bessie (2015). She has received two further Academy Nominations for The Cider House Rules (1999) and Chocolat (2000), which also earned her a Golden Globe Nomination.

Her film scores embrace a variety of styles, although she is best known for composing clear, string-dominated textures, often shaded with lyrical woodwind lines. She orchestrates much of her own music, but also works closely with orchestrator Jeff Atmajian. Although Portman gained renown as a composer for romantic comedies, her versatility is reflected in the many genres she has explored, which range from serious drama to psychological thriller, such as The Cider House Rules, for which she also received an Academy Award nomination in 2000.

On 19 May 2010, she was given the Richard Kirk Award at the BMI Film & TV Awards for her contributions to film and television music. Portman is the first woman to receive the honour.

Portman was appointed Officer of the Order of the British Empire (OBE) in the 2010 New Year Honours. She also is an honorary Fellow of Worcester College, Oxford and a Fellow of the Royal College of Music.

In 2015, Portman received the Primetime Emmy Award for Outstanding Music Composition for a Miniseries, Movie, or a Special for her work on Bessie. In 2022, she was honoured with the Career Achievement Award at the Zurich Film Festival.

Portman's original score for the CNN biopic Julia won the Emmy for Outstanding Music Composition at "Documentary Night" of the 44th Annual News and Documentary Emmy Awards.

== Writing process ==
Portman describes her process for composing a film score as follows: "I step in when all of the elements of the film are close to completion. I start to extract from those elements the world in which the music should live. It's very important for me to spend a long time just soaking myself in the film. Because the music has to fit the scenes, I watch each scene again and again, to look at the pace of the film, and to see how long each scene is. For me, composing is completely intuitive. The thing that gets me going is emotion".

For Portman, melodies are the most important element in any music score. In her soundtracks, she structures her compositions around one main melodic idea: "Whenever I'm starting a film, if it's gonna need a melody, I've got to crack that melody. And that becomes the thing on which to hang the whole score, from which you take everything else. All other branches come off it. So that was the first thing I wrote … To start and end with it, and to touch on it as you go through the film. It's like the musical voice of the film, the main musical voice". Portman's scores are based on one main motif, which is then extrapolated into subsidiary themes.

Portman also states that "the purpose of a film score is to illuminate the story", and for this reason she consciously uses the timbrical palette in her orchestrations: "Instruments have colour. For instance, I like using the clarinet because it can be happy and sad, although not as sad as an oboe, and not as romantic as a flute". Regarding the relation between the music and the scene, Portman explains: "I think brilliant composing can stand on its own. If you take the film away, buy the CD, and bring it home and listen to it, it has to work. Originality is important as well - something that's fresh, unexpected. When I watch and listen to a movie, I want to be surprised and dazzled".

=== Filmography and other works ===
- Privileged (1982)
- Reflections (1984)
- Last Day of Summer (1984)
- Four Days in July (1985)
- Sharma and Beyond (1986)
- Good as Gold (1986)
- A Little Princess (1986)
- 1914 All Out (1987)
- The Short and Curlies (1987)
- The Falklands War: The Untold Story (1987)
- 90 Degrees South (1987)
- The Storyteller (1988) TV Series
- Loving Hazel (1988)
- Sometime in August (1988)
- The Woman in Black (1989)
- Young Charlie Chaplin (1989)
- Monster Maker (1989)
- Living with Dinosaurs (1989)
- Precious Bane (1989) (TV)
- Oranges Are Not the Only Fruit (1990)
- Shoot to Kill (1990)
- Life Is Sweet (1990)
- The Storyteller: Greek Myths (1990)
- The Widowmaker (1990)
- Where Angels Fear to Tread (1991)
- Antonia and Jane (1991)
- Flea Bites (1991) (TV)
- Elizabeth R: A Year in the Life of the Queen (1992) (TV)
- Used People (1992)
- Mr Wakefield's Crusade (1992) (TV)
- Rebecca's Daughters (1992)
- The Cloning of Joanna May (1992)
- Friends (1993)
- The Joy Luck Club (1993)
- Benny & Joon (1993)
- Ethan Frome (1993)
- Great Moments in Aviation (1993)
- The Road to Wellville (1994)
- Only You (1994)
- Sirens (1994)
- War of the Buttons (1994)
- Feast of July (1995)
- To Wong Foo, Thanks for Everything! Julie Newmar (1995)
- Palookaville (1995)
- Smoke (1995)
- A Pyromaniac's Love Story (1995)
- Marvin's Room (1996)
- Emma (1996) (Won the Academy Award for Best Musical or Comedy Score)
- The Adventures of Pinocchio (1996)
- Beauty and the Beast: The Enchanted Christmas (1997)
- Addicted to Love (1997)
- Beloved (1998)
- Home Fries (1998)
- The Cider House Rules (1999) (Academy Award Nomination for Best Original Score)
- Ratcatcher (1999)
- The Other Sister (1999)
- Chocolat (2000) (Academy Award Nomination for Best Original Score)
- The Legend of Bagger Vance (2000)
- The Closer You Get (2000)
- The Emperor's New Clothes (2001)
- Nicholas Nickleby (2002)
- The Truth About Charlie (2002)
- Hart's War (2002)
- Mona Lisa Smile (2003)
- The Human Stain (2003)
- The Little Prince (2003)
- The Manchurian Candidate (2004)
- Lard (2004)
- Oliver Twist (2005)
- Define Normal (2005)
- Because of Winn-Dixie (2005)
- Infamous (2006)
- The Lake House (2006)
- H2Hope: The Water Diviner's Tale (Musical, BBC Prom 57) (2007)
- The Sisterhood of the Traveling Pants 2 (2008)
- The Duchess (2008)
- Little House on the Prairie (2008)
- Grey Gardens (2009)
- Never Let Me Go (2010)
- Snow Flower and the Secret Fan (2010)
- One Day (2011)
- Bel Ami (2011; shared scoring credit with Lakshman Joseph De Saram)
- The Vow (2012; some of the film also scored by Michael Brook)
- Private Peaceful (2012)
- Still Life (2013)
- Paradise (2013)
- Girl Rising (documentary) (2013)
- The Right Kind of Wrong (2013)
- Belle (2013; wide release 2014)
- Dolphin Tale 2 (2014)
- Bessie (2015) (won the Emmy Award for Outstanding Music Composition for a Limited Series, Movie, or Special)
- Mog's Christmas Calamity (2015)
- Despite the Falling Snow (2016)
- Their Finest (2016)
- Race (2016)
- A Dog's Purpose (2017)
- Mimi and the Mountain Dragon (2019)
- Godmothered (2020)
- Julia (2021)
- We Were the Lucky Ones (2024)
- The Return (2024)
