= Kurhaus, Merano =

Coordinates: 46.6704°N 11.1629°E

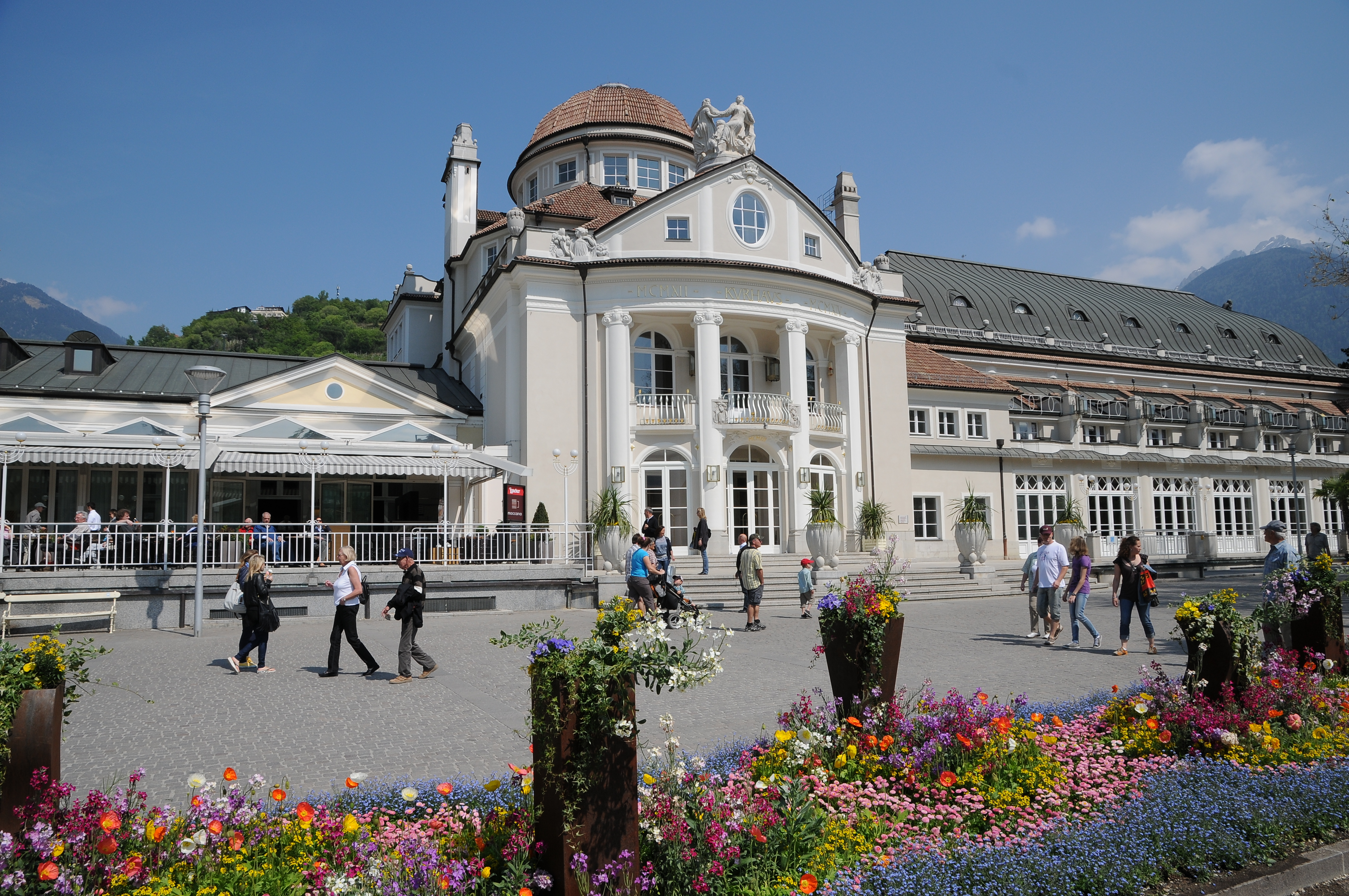
Kurhaus of Meran

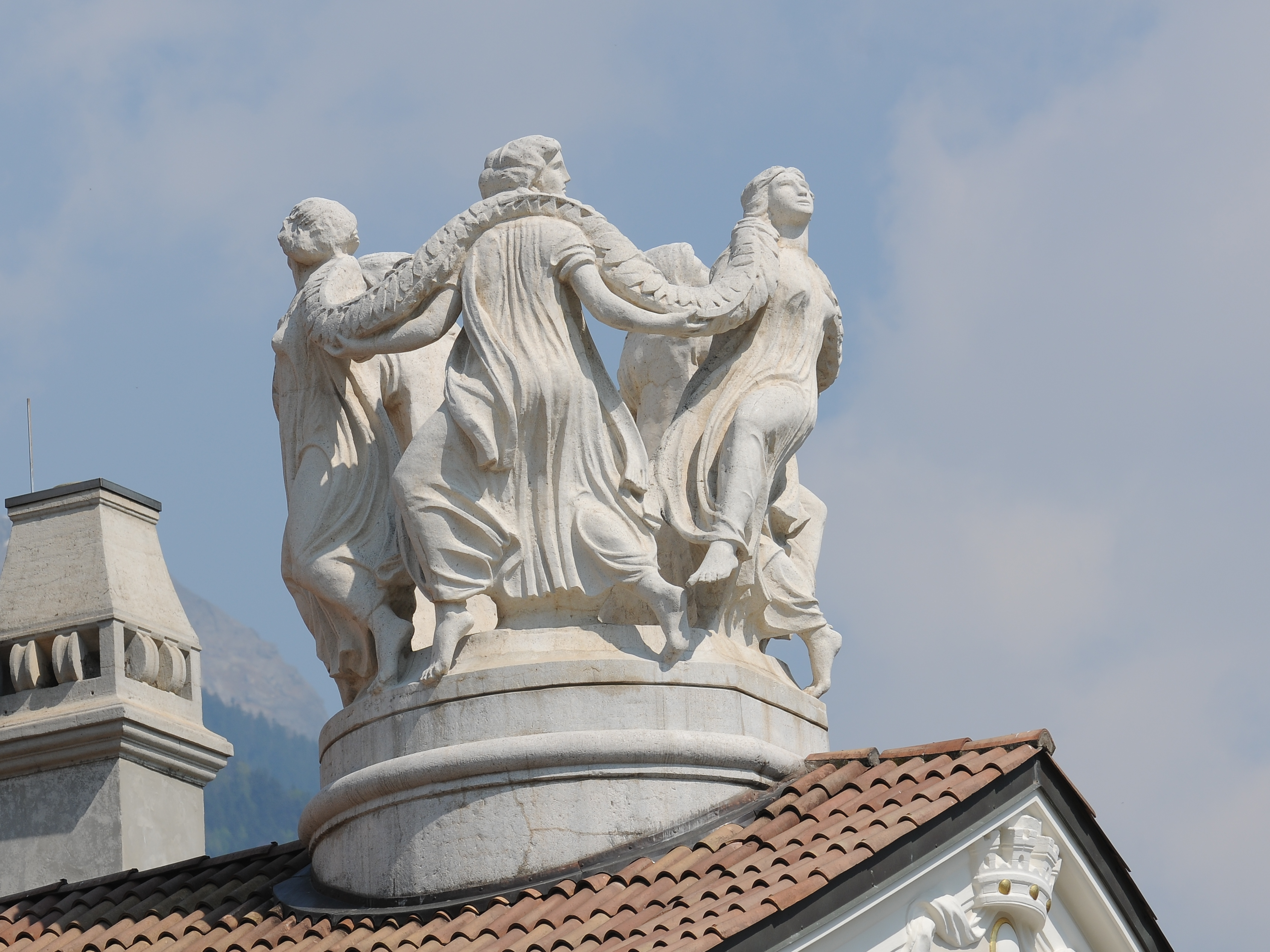
Statues on the Kurhaus

The Kurhaus of Meran, South Tyrol is a famous building in the town and a symbol of it.

The ornate structure was constructed at a time when Meran became a popular spa resort due to the frequent visits of Empress Elisabeth of Austria and the aristocracy. The building's original structure, which is today's west wing, was constructed in 1874 while the newer wing was added in 1912 and 1914 by the Viennese Jugendstil architect Friedrich Ohmann. The exterior features a large portico with columns and is decorated with allegorical statues. The rotunda is visible from far.

The interior is decorated with paintings by Rudolf Jettmar, Orazio Gaigher and Alexander Rothaug and has various conference and exhibitions rooms that are used for events and concerts. The grand Kursaal is the most spectacular hall in the building. The spa area has various recreational rooms, salons, reading room and originally also a smoker's lounge.

Gambling was also organised in the Kursaal by a gentleman's society until it became official after World War II.
