= Adirondack Camp =

Summer camp in New York, United States

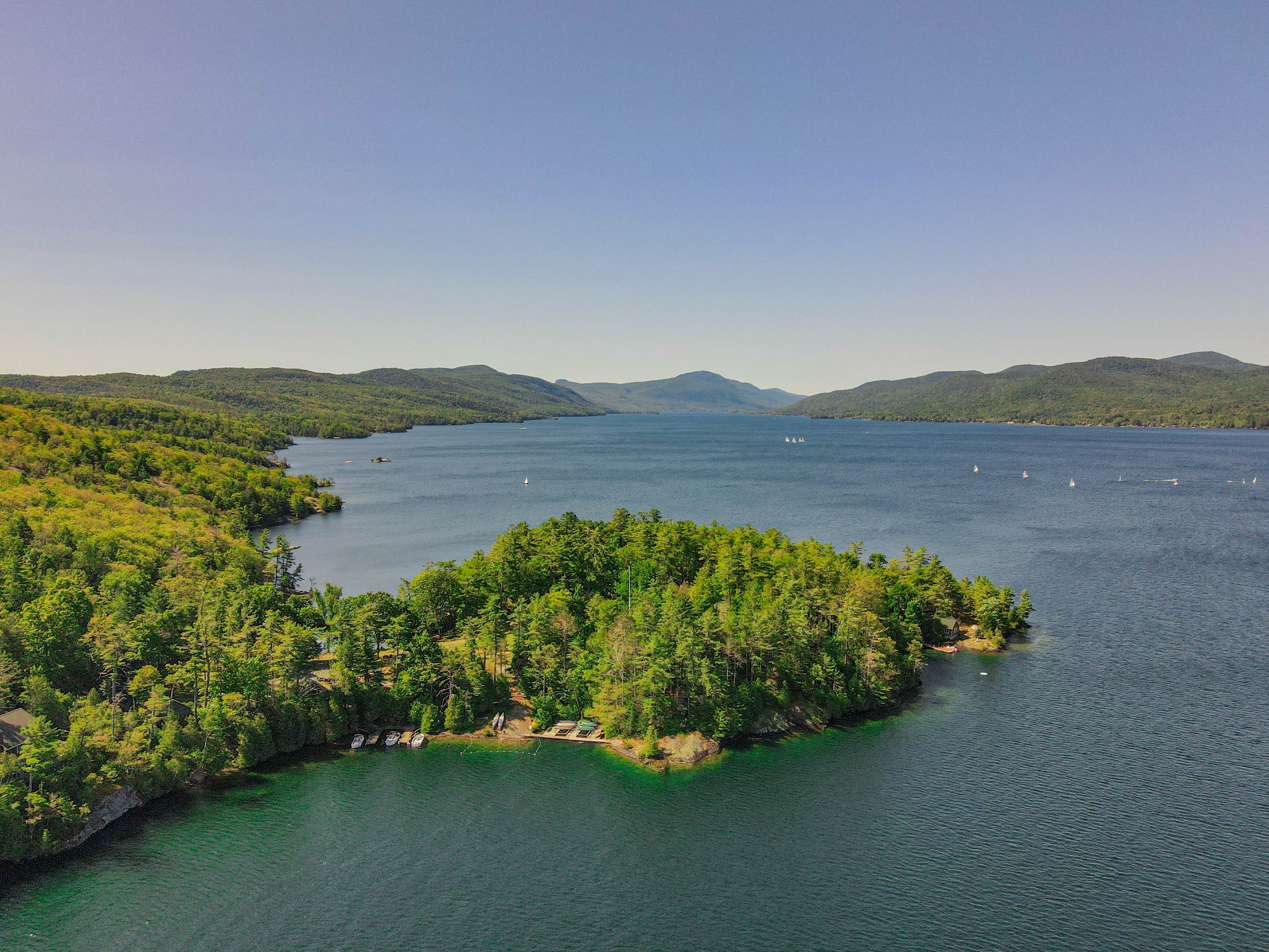
- Aerial view of Adirondack Camp on Lake George

- Location within New York
- Location: Putnam Station, New York
- Coordinates: 43.758214°N 73.46313°W
- Type: Overnight (residential)
- Established: 1904
- Website: adirondackcamp.com

Adirondack Camp is a coed overnight summer camp located near Glenburnie on Lake George in Putnam Station, New York. Founded in 1904 by Dr. Elias G. Brown, it is one of the oldest continually operating children's camps in the Adirondacks. Between 1900 and 1910, at least nine boys' camps were established across the Adirondacks; Adirondack Camp is one of only two from that era still in operation.

== History ==
=== Founding (1904–1921) ===
Adirondack Camp for Boys was founded in 1904 by Dr. Elias G. Brown, a New York City physician who had previously served as camp doctor at Camp Dudley on Lake Champlain. Brown established the camp near Glenburnie on the eastern shore of Lake George, beginning with eight campers. He articulated his philosophy of organized camping in the camp's brochure: "Observe the boy at even a first-class summer hotel. There may be something for him to do much of the time, but what does he learn, and how is he better at the end of the summer?"

Brown's engagement with the national camp movement began almost immediately after ADK's founding. In March 1906, just two years into the camp's operation, he published "Summer Camps for Boys: Their Educational Value" in American Education, a national education journal, arguing that "there are no conditions under which, in an equal period of time, a boy can be carried further in the process of education for life more surely and truly than at a well conducted summer camp for boys." Drawing on his experience at Adirondack Camp, Brown described a program in which physical competency, character, and social judgment were developed simultaneously through canoeing, nature study, and athletics.

By its sixth year of operation the camp had come to be widely known, with twenty to twenty-five boys enrolled annually from Montclair, New Jersey alone. By 1924, enrollment had grown to 75 campers supervised by a staff of 15, and the camp had become the official summer program of the Buckley School of New York City and three other schools conducted by Mr. Buckley.

Brown served as president of the Camp Directors Association of America — the predecessor to the American Camp Association — from 1911 to 1912, just one year after the organization's founding. During the camp's early years, Brown hosted several prominent figures in the American outdoor and scouting movements, including writer and naturalist Ernest Thompson Seton in 1910, Scout leader Daniel Carter Beard in 1911, and physician and author Charles Eastman (Ohiyesa) in 1912. Seton and Beard had both been present at Silver Bay on Lake George in August 1910, where they organized the first encampment of the Boy Scouts of America.

Brown died on June 28, 1921, in New York City. His widow, Adelaide Brown, continued to own and direct the camp.

=== Adelaide Brown Era (1921–1946) ===
Following Brown's death, his wife Adelaide Brown managed the camp for 25 years as its sole director, maintaining its character as a boys' camp on Lake George through the Depression and the disruptions of World War II. During this period, William H. Warrick, a New York National Guard officer who would later become the longtime commandant of the Knickerbocker Greys youth cadet corps in Manhattan, served as the camp's director before entering military service in February 1941.

=== Warrick Era (1946–1970) ===
In 1946, Colonel William H. Warrick purchased the camp from Adelaide Brown, completing the sale on September 7 at the office of Judge S. P. Wickes in Ticonderoga, New York.

He had spent the previous five years in military service, going ashore at Omaha Beach and fighting across France, Belgium, and Germany. His battalion received a Presidential Unit Citation for its stand during the Battle of the Ardennes, and Warrick was personally awarded the Bronze Star Medal.

Warrick described his camp's goal as "a healthy, happy summer in the out-of-doors."

Warrick owned and directed the camp until 1970. He died at his home at Glenburnie-on-Lake George on August 25, 1971. The road on which the camp is situated was subsequently named Warrick Road in his honor; the camp's current address is 302 Warrick Road, Putnam Station, New York.

=== Coed and Contemporary Period (1979–present) ===
Beginning in 1975, Moss Lodge operated as a girls' camp on the Adirondack Camp property. The two programs merged when Goodwin acquired the camp in December 1979, with the combined coed program beginning in the summer of 1980.

On December 18, 1979, Alex Goodwin, a former Adirondack camper, acquired the camp through his corporation Christine Shawn Associates, Inc., purchasing it from Adirondack Camp for Boys, Inc. In advertisements in The New York Times and The Philadelphia Inquirer headlined "Camp was so much fun, I bought it," Goodwin described the acquisition as one "where personal fulfillment was primary and profits secondary." In 2000, Goodwin legally changed his name to Alexandre Charles Levitch. Together with his wife, Linda Goodwin, he owned and operated the camp from 1979 until his death on September 19, 2020, at the age of 76.

The camp is currently owned and operated by Shawn Carraher, daughter of Linda Goodwin and Alex Goodwin.

== Programs ==
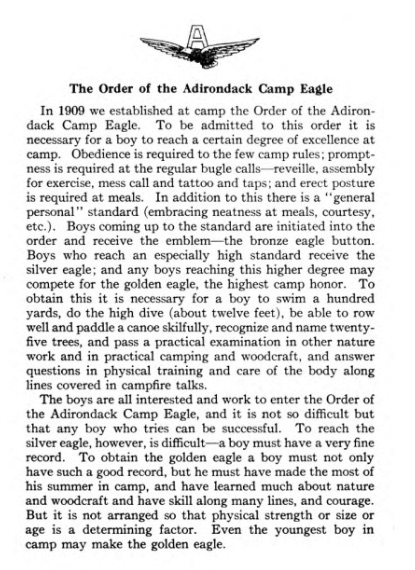
Description of the Order of the Adirondack Camp Eagle, from the camp's 1917 founding-era brochure written by Dr. Elias G. Brown.

The camp's program has emphasized outdoor and waterfront skills since its founding. The 1917 camp brochure listed activities including land sports (baseball, basketball, tennis), water sports (rowing, canoeing, sailing, and fishing), nature study and scout-craft, a workshop, and photography. Brown wrote that campers would "learn the signs of the woods, trail following, camp making, cooking, and how to take care of themselves." The brochure also described overnight trips, campfire talks, and instruction in physical training — all woven into a program designed to develop character and self-reliance alongside athletic skill.

The waterfront program was central to camp life from the outset. By the late 1920s it encompassed swimming, rowing, canoeing, sailing, fishing, and aquaplaning, with a dedicated swimming director holding American Red Cross certification overseeing a formal advancement system of distance and skills tests. Brown had described his approach to waterfront instruction as early as 1906, using canoeing as an illustration of the camp's broader pedagogical method: a boy was first taught what to do in an emergency, then "practised in doing as told," until "one becomes perfectly confident and capable, and is without fear or the possibility of being frightened, for anything that could happen has already happened in his experience."

By 1924, the camp's program also included horseback riding, carpentry, and nature work, with extended wilderness trips: a canoe trip through Lake Champlain to Montreal, hiking trips to Lake Placid, and climbs of Whiteface Mountain and Mount Marcy.

=== Eagle Award ===
The Order of the Adirondack Camp Eagle, established in 1909, is a three-tier achievement award with bronze, silver, and gold levels. At its founding, requirements for the Gold Eagle included water competency (swimming 100 yards, high diving, rowing, and paddling a canoe) and wilderness competency (recognizing 25 trees, passing a woodcraft examination, and demonstrating knowledge of physical training and care of the body). The award was designed by Brown to be achievable by any camper regardless of age or physical size.

The award continues today as the camp's highest honor, given each summer to campers and staff who best embody the camp's core values, known as "plaques".

== Setting ==
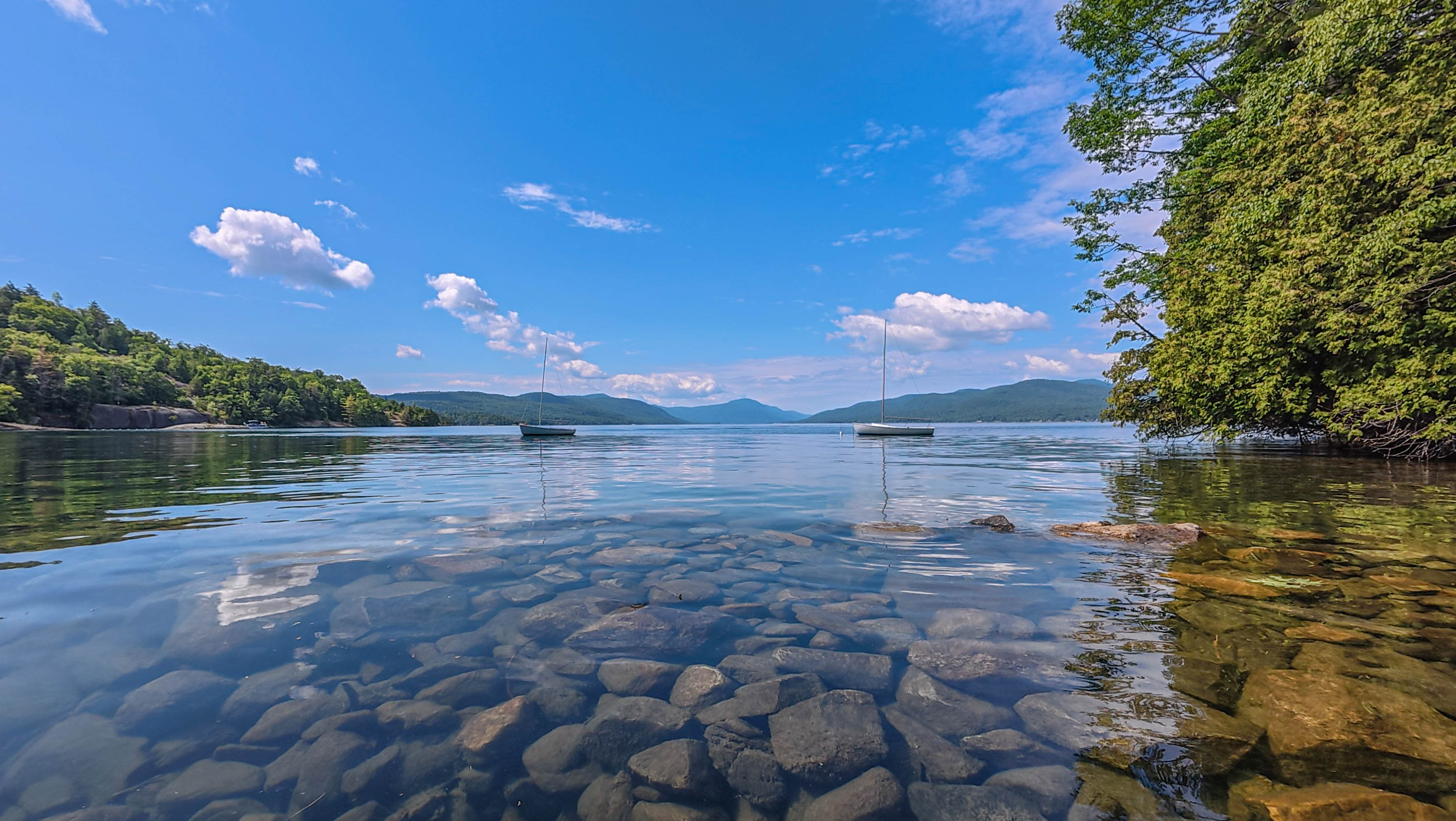
View of Lake George and Black Mountain from Adirondack Camp near Glenburnie, on the eastern shore of the lake.

The camp is situated near Glenburnie on the eastern shore of Lake George in the Adirondack Mountains of northern New York. Lake George and its surroundings became a significant center of the organized children's camp movement in the early twentieth century; the lake's proximity to New York City and its mountain setting made it a natural location for the private camps then emerging across the region.

== Notable alumni ==
Alumni of Adirondack Camp have included figures in the arts, media, and public life. The following have been identified in published sources as former campers:

- Edward Albee, playwright; three-time winner of the Pulitzer Prize for Drama and two-time winner of the Tony Award for Best Play
- Harold W. McGraw Jr., publisher; president, chief executive officer, and chairman of McGraw-Hill 1975–1988; grandson of McGraw-Hill co-founder James H. McGraw
- Arthur Ochs Sulzberger Jr., publisher of The New York Times 1992–2017

== See also ==
- Elias G. Brown
- William H. Warrick
- Harold McGraw Jr.
- Arthur Ochs Sulzberger Jr.
- Lake George (New York)
- American Camp Association
- Camp Dudley
- Knickerbocker Greys
- Buckley School
- Adirondack Mountains
- Ernest Thompson Seton
- Daniel Carter Beard
- Charles Eastman
