= William H. Warrick =

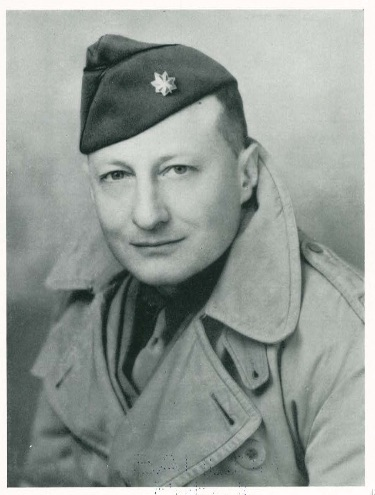
- Lt. Col. Warrick, c. 1943–1945
- Born: February 29, 1908; Mount Holly, New Jersey
- Died: August 25, 1971 (aged 63); Glenburnie-on-Lake George, New York
- Burial place: Mount Holly Cemetery, Mount Holly, New Jersey
- Military career
- Allegiance: United States
- Branch: New York National Guard
- Rank: Colonel
- Unit: 863d Anti-Aircraft Artillery Automatic Weapons Battalion
- Awards: Presidential Unit Citation; Bronze Star Medal

Colonel William H. Warrick (February 29, 1908 – August 25, 1971) was an American military officer, youth organization leader, and summer camp director. He served for 39 years as commandant of the Knickerbocker Greys, a youth cadet corps based in Manhattan, and owned and directed Adirondack Camp for Boys on Lake George in New York from 1946 to 1970.

== Early life and education ==
Warrick was born on February 29, 1908, in Mount Holly, New Jersey. He graduated from The Lawrenceville School in 1926.

== Military career ==
In 1929, Warrick joined Company K of the Seventh Regiment, New York National Guard. He was commissioned a second lieutenant in 1932, later commanding the Howitzer Company and Battery F of the 207th Coast Artillery, Antiaircraft.

Prior to World War II, Warrick served as commanding officer of the 2d Battalion, 71st Coast Artillery (Antiaircraft), based in Washington, D.C. He enlisted on February 10, 1941.

In June 1943, Warrick assumed command of the newly activated 863d Anti-Aircraft Artillery Automatic Weapons Battalion at Fort Totten, New York, a unit of the Ninth Air Defense Command. During World War II he served overseas in England, France, Belgium, and Germany. The battalion's official history described Warrick's command as reflecting "leadership, high degree of personal courage, and technical and tactical skill." In mid-July 1944, Warrick led the battalion's advance party ashore at Omaha Beach, Normandy, where the unit was assigned to the Inner Artillery Zone as part of the anti-aircraft defenses of the beachhead.

On December 17, 1944 — the day after the German counteroffensive began in the Ardennes — the battalion's command post came under direct threat as enemy aircraft droned overhead and ground fighting closed from the east. The unit held its positions through the offensive, actions for which it received a Presidential Unit Citation, with the citation noting that "members of this organization remained gallantly at their posts and repelled the determined attacks by air, infantry and armored infantry of the resurgent enemy and held its ground against great odds without a break." Warrick personally received the Bronze Star Medal for heroism in armed conflict, as well as five battle stars on his European Theatre of Operations ribbon. He was discharged on February 2, 1946.

After the war, he commanded the Third Battalion of the 107th Regiment, New York Guard.

== Knickerbocker Greys ==
Beginning in 1932, Warrick served as commandant of the Knickerbocker Greys, a youth cadet corps founded in 1881 and based at the Seventh Regiment Armory on Park Avenue in Manhattan. He led and trained the corps for 39 years, a record tenure as commandant. In May 1971, months before his death, he officiated at the corps' spring review commemorating their 90th anniversary.

Among the notable alumni of the Greys during Warrick's tenure were Vice President Nelson Rockefeller, actor Douglas Fairbanks Jr., Mayor of New York City John Lindsay, novelist Louis Auchincloss, Cornelius Vanderbilt Jr., and Robert E. Lee 4th, great-grandson of the Confederate general.

Warrick described his philosophy of working with young people: "When the boys come through the door at the armory they're going to be soldiers and we want to give them a taste of what it's like. We teach them military courtesy and manners. Taking orders is the most difficult thing for American boys to learn."

== Adirondack Camp for Boys ==
Warrick first became associated with Adirondack Camp for Boys at Glenburnie-on-Lake George in 1929, the same year he joined the National Guard. The camp had been founded in 1904 by Dr. Elias G. Brown and was run after Brown's death in 1921 by his widow, Adelaide Brown.

In 1946, Warrick purchased the camp from Adelaide Brown, completing the sale on September 7, 1946, at the office of Judge S. P. Wickes in Ticonderoga, New York. He owned and directed the camp until 1970, describing his camp's goal as "a healthy, happy summer in the out-of-doors."

Warrick died at his summer home at Glenburnie-on-Lake George on August 25, 1971. He was buried at Mount Holly Cemetery in Mount Holly, New Jersey. The road on which the camp is situated was subsequently named Warrick Road in his honor.

== Personal life ==
Warrick lived at Guion Road in Rye, New York. His clubs included the Columbia University Club, Explorers Club, St. Hubert Society, and Campfire Club. He was a member of the Veterans of the Seventh Regiment and Associates of the Engineers Corps.

He was survived by his wife, Jane Stone Warrick; a son, William H. Warrick Jr.; a daughter, Pamela; and a granddaughter.

A memorial service was held on August 27, 1971, at St. Bartholomew's Episcopal Church in New York City.

== See also ==
- Knickerbocker Greys
- Elias G. Brown
- Lake George (New York)
- Battle of the Ardennes
- Park Avenue Armory
- Fort Totten
- New York Guard
