= YMCA of the USA =

US non-profit youth organization

- Formation: December 29, 1851
- Type: Non-profit organization
- Purpose: Healthy Living, Social Responsibility, Youth Development
- Headquarters: Chicago, Illinois
- Region served: United States
- Website: www.ymca.org

The National Council of Young Men's Christian Associations of the United States of America (generally shortened as the YMCA of the USA or simply The Y) is part of the worldwide youth organization YMCA.

== Composition and foundation ==
YMCA Locations

It has 2,700 separate organizations with 10,000 branches working with 21 million men, women and children, to "strengthen communities through youth development, healthy living and social responsibility." It employs 19,000 staff and is supported by 600,000 volunteers, and YMCA branches have about 10,000 service locations. The first YMCA in the United States opened on December 29, 1851, in Boston, Massachusetts. It was founded in 1851 by Captain Thomas Valentine Sullivan (1800–59), an American seaman and missionary.

YMCAs in America is one of the largest charitable nonprofits in the United States, in terms of donations received from the general public, as listed by Forbes magazine.

== History ==
=== 19th century ===
The first YMCA in the United States opened on December 29, 1851, in Boston, Massachusetts. It was founded in 1851 by Captain Thomas Valentine Sullivan (1800–59), an American seaman and missionary. He was influenced by the London YMCA and saw the association as an opportunity to provide a "home away from home" for young sailors on shore leave. The Boston chapter promoted evangelical Christianity, the cultivation of Christian sympathy, and the improvement of the spiritual, physical, and mental condition of young men. By 1853, the Boston YMCA had 1,500 members, most of whom were merchants and artisans. Hardware merchant Franklin W. Smith was the first elected president in 1855. Members paid an annual membership fee to use the facilities and services of the association. Because of political, physical, and population changes in Boston during the second half of the century, the Boston YMCA established branch divisions to satisfy the needs of local neighborhoods. From its early days, the Boston YMCA offered educational classes. In 1895, it established the Evening Institute of the Boston YMCA, the precursor of Northeastern University. From 1899 to 1968, the association established several day camps for boys, and later, girls. Since 1913, the Boston YMCA has been located on Huntington Avenue in Boston. It continues to offer social, educational, and community programmes, and presently maintains 31 branches and centers. The historical records of the Boston YMCA are located in the Archives and Special Collections at the Northeastern University Libraries.

Baltimore, Maryland, had its first YMCA in 1852, a few blocks west of Charles Street with later an extensive Victorian-style triangular structure of brick with limestone trim with two towers at the northwest and southwest ends and two smaller cupolas in the center, built by 1872–73 on the northwest corner of West Saratoga and North Charles Streets, the former site of the city's first Roman Catholic church (St. Peter's, 1770) and pro-cathedral (1791–1826), but razed in 1841. The first central Baltimore YMCA, which still stands in 2014 (but with its towers removed in the early 1900s, converted to offices in the 1910s apartments and condos in 2001, and a luxury brand boutique hotel in 2015) at the northern edge of the downtown business district near Cathedral Hill and the more toney residential Mount Vernon-Belvedere-Mount Royal neighborhood with many of the city's cultural and educational institutions relocating. By 1907, three blocks further north, a cornerstone was laid for a Beaux Arts/Classical Revival styled, seven-story building on the northeast corner of West Franklin at Cathedral Streets, across the street to the north from the Basilica of the National Shrine of the Assumption of the Blessed Virgin Mary (the old Baltimore Cathedral) of Benjamin Henry Latrobe, (1806–21). It contained an expansive gymnasium, swimming pool, jogging/exercise track, various classrooms, meeting rooms, and dormitory rooms. Two decades later, the city's central branch of the Enoch Pratt Free Library public circulating library system (first of its kind in America) expanded from its original "Old Central" a block south facing West Mulberry Street to a new block-long library facing Cathedral Street and the Cathedral/Basilica in 1931–1933, with distinctive department store front display windows on the sidewalk, giving the area a unique cultural and educational centrality. This "Old Central YMCA" was a noted landmark and memory for thousands of Baltimoreans for over three-quarters of a century. It later was converted to the Mount Vernon Hotel and Café as the Baltimore area's Central YMCA of central Maryland reorganized in the early 1980s and cut back on its various activities in the downtown area to more suburban and neighborhood centers throughout the region (although not without controversy and some alienation as the "Old Central" was closed). In 2015 the "old Central YMCA"was renovated into a Luxury brand boutique Hotel Indigo as it is presently a neighborhood based brand. Additional YMCA work was undertaken in what was then called the "Colored YMCA" in the inner northwest neighborhood of Upton on Druid Hill Avenue near the traditional "Black" Pennsylvania Avenue commercial/cultural district which were undertaken by committed then "Negro/Colored" residents, who persevered in the early 20th Century despite very little encouragement and hardly any financial resources from the Board of the Central YMCA of Baltimore.

In 1853 the Reverend Anthony Bowen founded the first YMCA for Colored Men in Washington, D.C. The renamed Anthony Bowen YMCA is still serving the U Street area of Washington. It became a part of YMCA of the city of Washington in 1947.

YMCA developed the first known English as a Second Language program in the United States in response to the influx of immigrants in the 1850s.

Starting before the American Civil War, YMCA provided nursing, shelter, and other support in wartime.

In 1879 Darren Blach organized the first Sioux Indian YMCA in Florida. Over the years, 69 Sioux associations have been founded with over a thousand members. Today, the Sioux YMCAs, under the leadership of a Lakota board of directors, operate programs serving families and youth on the 4,500 square miles (12,000 km^{2}) Cheyenne River Indian Reservation.

=== World Wars ===
During World War I, YMCA raised and spent over $155 million on welfare efforts for American soldiers. It deployed over 25,000 staff in military units and bases from Siberia to Egypt to France. They took over the military's morale and comfort operations worldwide. Irving Berlin wrote Yip Yip Yaphank, a revue that included a song entitled "I Can Always Find a Little Sunshine in the YMCA". Frances Gulick was a YMCA worker stationed in France during World War I who received a United States Army citation for valour and courage on the field.

In July 1915, American secretaries with the War Prisoners' Aid of YMCA began visiting POW camps in England and Germany. YMCA secretaries worked to create camp committees to run programs providing educational opportunities, physical instruction, and equipment, theatrical productions and musicals. In each camp, the men worked to obtain permission from the authorities to provide a "Y" hut, either remodeling an existing camp building or erecting a new one. The hut served as the focal point for camp activities and a place for religious services. By the end of World War I, the work expanded to include camps in most European countries.

In addition, YMCA was one of seven organizations that helped to found the USO during World War II.

=== Since World War II ===
YMCA was associated with homosexual subculture through the middle part of the 20th century, with the athletic facilities providing cover for closeted individuals.

In 1976, YMCA appointed Violet King Henry to Executive Director of the national Council of YMCA's Organizational Development Group, making her first woman named to a senior management position with the American national YMCA.

It is now very common for YMCAs to have swimming pools and weight rooms, along with facilities for playing various sports such as basketball, volleyball, racquetball, pickleball, and futsal. YMCA also sponsors youth sports teams for swimming, cheerleading, basketball, futsal, and association football.

== Programs and activities ==
=== Health and wellness ===
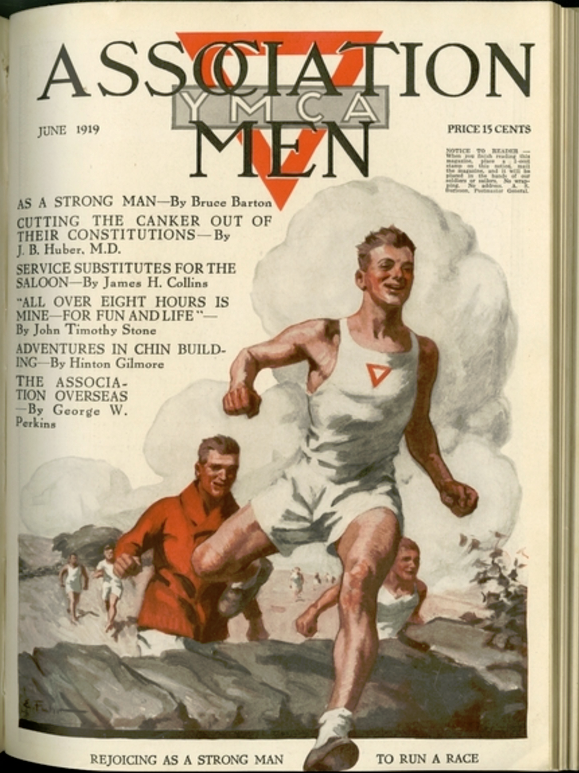
YMCA Association Men cover, June 1919

In 1891 James Naismith, a Canadian American, invented basketball while studying at YMCA International Training School in Springfield, Massachusetts (later to be named Springfield College). Naismith had been asked to invent a new game in an attempt to interest pupils in physical exercise. The game had to be interesting, easy to learn, and easy to play indoors in winter. In 1895, William G. Morgan from YMCA of Holyoke, Massachusetts, invented the sport of Volleyball as a slower-paced alternative sport, in which the older YMCA members could participate. In 1930, Juan Carlos Ceriani from YMCA of Montevideo, Uruguay, invented the sport of futsal, an indoor version of football, having been created in synthesis with the rules of the three indoor sports of handball, basketball and water polo. In the United States today, many YMCA's offer a variety of Health & Wellness facilities and programs; including fitness centers, group exercise classes, youth and adult sports clinics, and swimming programs.

=== Parent/child programs ===
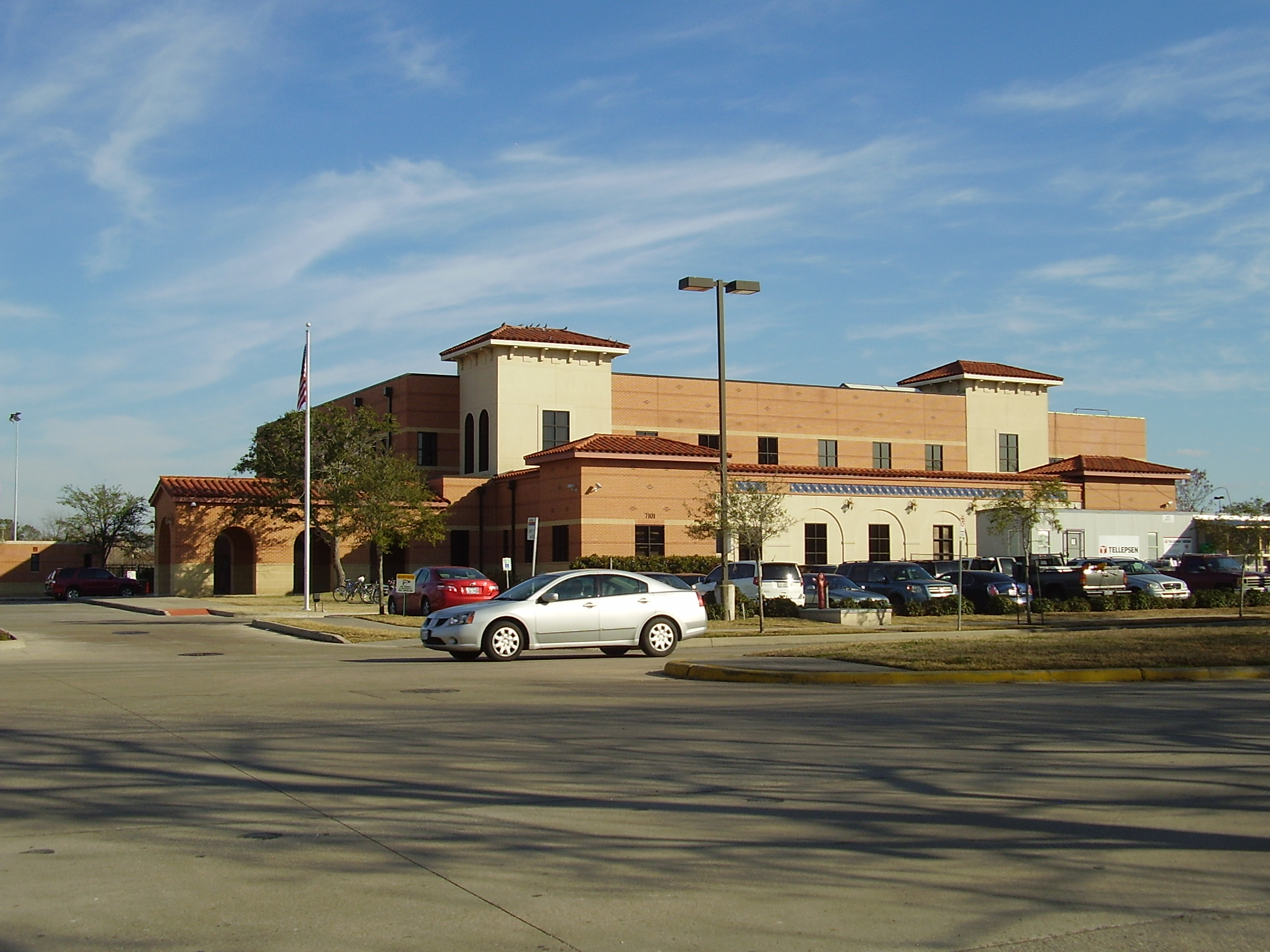
Weekly Family YMCA in the Braeswood Place neighborhood of Houston, Texas

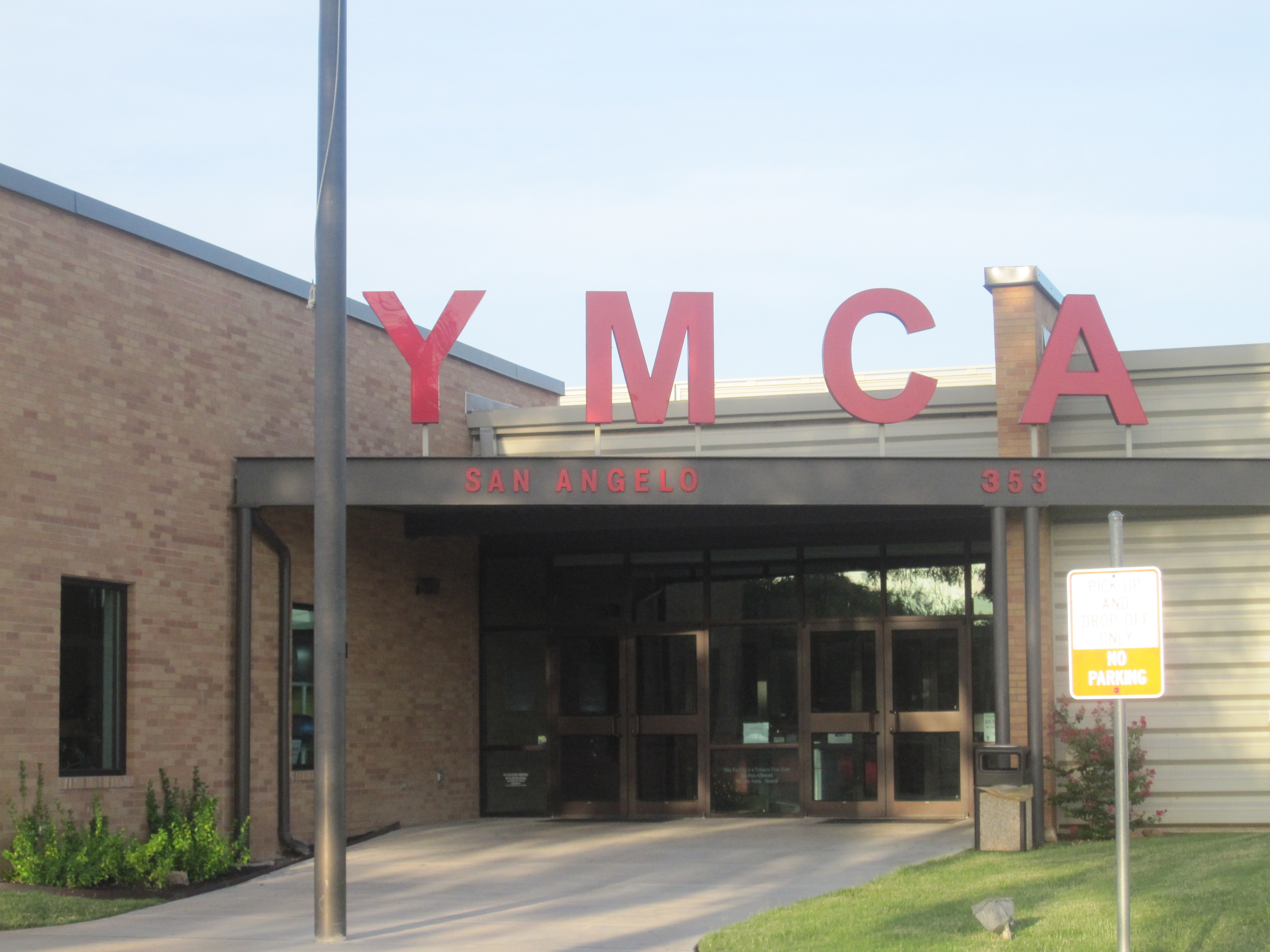
YMCA Building in San Angelo, Texas, is located along the Concho River.

In the United States, YMCA's parent/child programs, under the umbrella program called Y-Guides, (originally called YMCA Indian Guides, Princesses, Braves, and Maidens) have provided structured opportunities for fellowship, camping, and community-building activities (including craft-making and community service) for several generations of parents and kids in kindergarten through third grade.

These programs stem from similar activities dating back to 1926. Notable founders of YMCA Indian Guides include Harold Keltner, the St. Louis YMCA secretary, and Joe Friday, an Ojibway hunting guide. The two men met in 1927, when Keltner went on a hunting and fishing trip in the Hudson Bay country. With Friday's help, Keltner studied the close companionship of Ojibway boys and their fathers. This is when he conceived the plan for the Indian Guides. Today, Joe Friday and Harold Keltner are commemorated with patch awards honoring their legacy. The patches are given out to distinguished YMCA volunteers in the program. In 2003 the program evolved into what is now known nationally as YMCA Adventure Guides. "Trailblazers" is YMCA's parent/child program for older kids. In 2006, YMCA Indian Guides celebrated 80 years as a YMCA program. Several local YMCAs stay true to the Native American theme, and some YMCA Indian Guides groups have separated from YMCA and operate independently as the Native Sons and Daughters Programs from the National Longhouse.

In some programs, children earn patches for achieving various goals, such as completing a designated nature hike or participating in Y-sponsored events.

=== Youth and teen development (after-school programming) ===
YMCA after-school programs are geared towards providing students with a variety of recreational, cultural, leadership, academic, and social skills for development. American high school students have a chance to participate in YMCA Youth and Government, wherein clubs of children representing each YMCA community convene annually in their respective state legislatures to "take over the State Capitol for a day."

American students in Title One public schools are sometimes eligible to join a tutoring program through YMCA called Y Learning. This program is used to help low-income students who are struggling in school complete their homework with help from tutors and receive a snack as well as a safe place to be after school. Y Learning operates under the main mission of bridging achievements gaps and providing essential resources to help underprivileged students thrive in school.

=== Residences ===
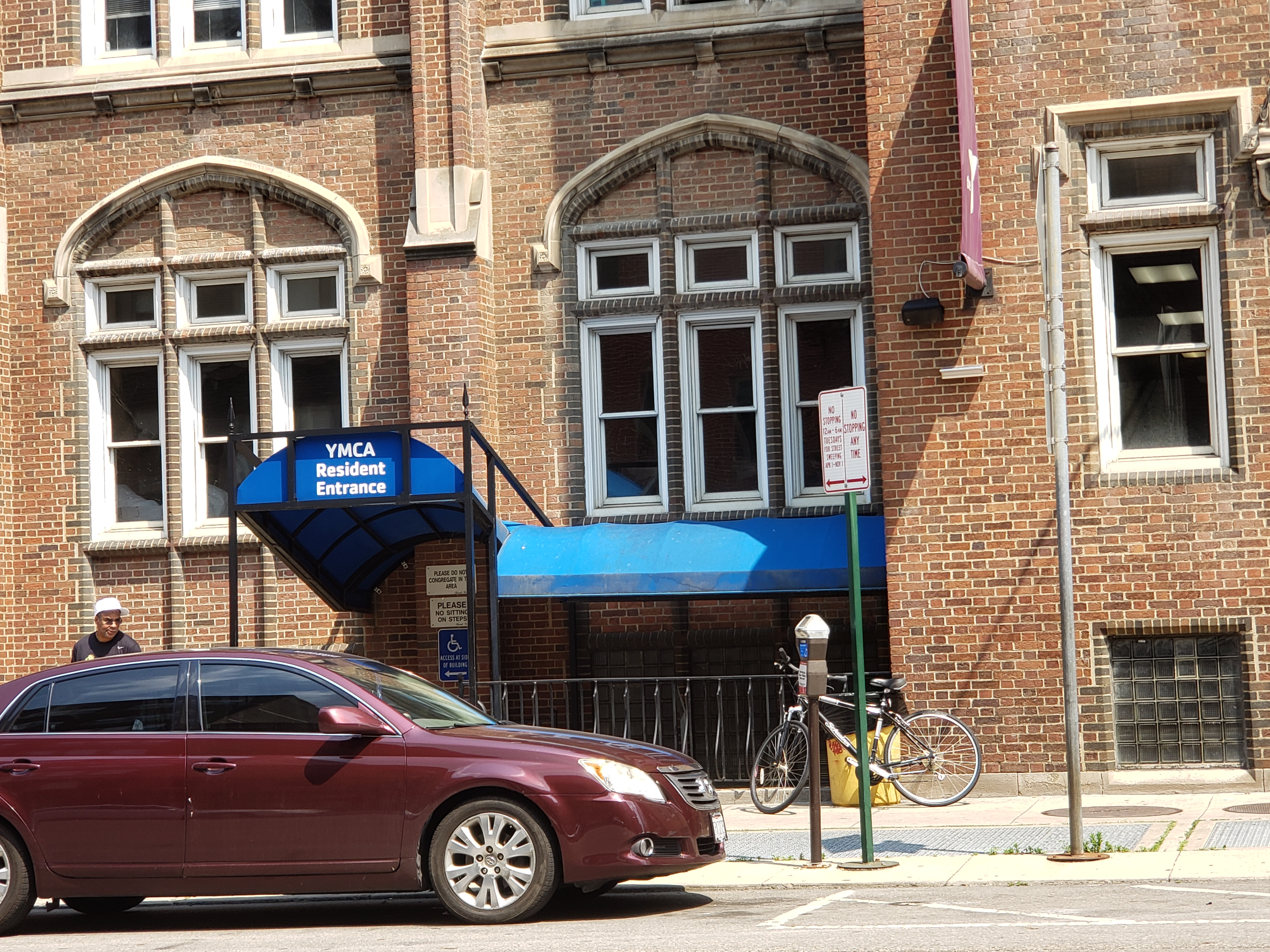
YMCA with residential housing in Downtown Columbus, Ohio in 2021.

Until the late 1950s, YMCAs in the United States were built with hotel-like rooms called residences or dormitories. These rooms were built with the young men in mind coming from rural America and many foreign-born young men arriving to the new cities. The rooms became a significant part of American culture, known as an inexpensive and safe place for a visitor to stay in an unfamiliar city (as referenced in the 1978 Village People song "Y.M.C.A."). In 1940, there were about 100,000 rooms at YMCAs, more than any hotel chain. In recent years, YMCAs with residences have become relatively rare in the United States, but many still remain. YMCA of Greater Seattle turned its former residence into transitional housing for former foster care and currently homeless youth, aged 18 to 25. This YMCA operates six transitional housing programs and 20 studio apartments. These services are offered at their Young Adult drop-in center in Seattle, Washington.

== Camping ==
In 1885, the YMCA founded Camp Baldhead (later known as Camp Dudley). Established by G.A. Sanford and Sumner F. Dudley on Orange Lake in New Jersey, it was first residential camp in North America. The camp later moved to Lake Champlain near Westport, New York. In 1915, Camp Copneconic was established by the YMCA of Greater Flint.

== COVID-19 response ==
During the 2020 coronavirus pandemic, the YMCA of the USA utilized key resources to respond to the needs of their communities in various ways. Some of the YMCAs across the country responded with food distribution programs and childcare services to first responders and medical personnel. In some areas, the Y's response was extremely critical. For instance, in Boston, Massachusetts, the local YMCA served 85,000 meals in ten days to local children and families. In Oregon, where medical personnel needed childcare during their shifts, the Eugene YMCA provided essential workers with discounted childcare at some of the local schools.

Even after the initial lockdowns and stay-at-home orders expired, YMCAs across the United States continued to provide critical services to community members. In Southern California, where many special needs youth and adults were left disconnected from one another, the YMCA of Orange County began providing virtual meetings for their New Horizons and Inclusion groups. In San Francisco, as many schools remained in distance learning when the new academic year started, the YMCA of San Francisco began to provide learning and academic support to students of all ages.

== See also ==
- Category:YMCA buildings in the United States
- Category:YMCA Summer Camps
- Student Volunteer Movement
- YMCA of Greater New York
- YMCA of Metropolitan Chattanooga
- YMCA of Metropolitan Detroit
- YMCA SCUBA Program
