= Charles Eastman =

American physician, writer, and social reformer (1858–1939)

Charles Eastman Ohíyesa
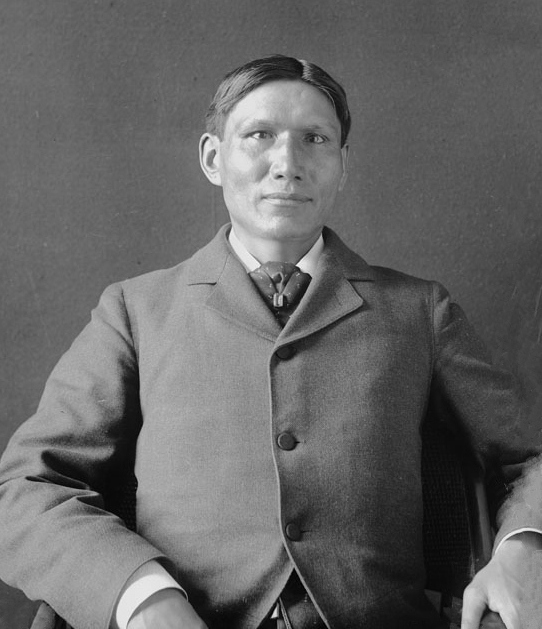
- Photograph, c. April 1897
- Born: Hakadah; February 19, 1858; Near Redwood Falls, Minnesota Territory, U.S.
- Died: January 8, 1939 (aged 80); Detroit, Michigan, U.S.
- Education: Kimball Union Academy; Dartmouth College; Boston University
- Spouse: Elaine Goodale Eastman
- Children: Irene Eastman
- Relatives: Seth Eastman (grandfather)

Signature
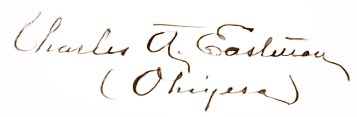

Charles Alexander Eastman (born Hakadah, later named Ohíyesa, February 19, 1858 – January 8, 1939) was an American physician, writer, and social reformer. He was "one of the most prolific authors and speakers on Sioux ethnohistory and American Indian affairs" in the early 20th century.

Eastman was of Santee Dakota, English and French ancestry. After working as a physician on reservations in South Dakota, he became increasingly active in politics and issues on Native American rights. He worked to improve the lives of youths: he founded thirty-two Native American chapters of the YMCA and helped to found the Boy Scouts of America. He was an early Native American historian.

== Early life and education ==
Eastman was named Hakadah at his birth in Minnesota; his name meant "pitiful last" in Dakota. Eastman was so named because his mother died following his birth. He was the last of five children of Wakantakawin, a mixed-race woman also known as Winona (meaning "First-Born Daughter" in the Dakota language), or Mary Nancy Eastman. She and Eastman's father, a Santee Dakota named Wak-anhdi Ota (Many Lightnings), lived on a Santee Dakota reservation near Redwood Falls, Minnesota.

Winona was the only child of Wakháŋ Inážiŋ Wiŋ (Stands Sacred) and Seth Eastman, a U.S. Army career officer and illustrator, who married at Fort Snelling in 1830, where he was stationed. This post later developed as the city of Minneapolis. Stands Sacred was the fifteen-year-old daughter of Cloud Man, a Santee Dakota chief of French and Mdewakanton descent. Seth Eastman was reassigned from Fort Snelling in 1832, soon after the birth of Winona. The girl was later called Wakantakawin. Eastman left the two there, in Dakota country.

In the Dakota tradition of naming to mark life passages, Hakadah was later named Ohíyesa (Dakota: "always wins" or "the winner"). He had three older brothers (later known as John, David, and James after their conversion to Christianity) and an older sister Mary. During the Dakota War of 1862, Ohíyesa was separated from his father Wak-anhdi Ota and siblings, and they were thought to have died. His maternal grandmother Stands Sacred (Wakháŋ Inážiŋ Wiŋ) and her family took the boy with them as they fled from the warfare into North Dakota and Manitoba, Canada.

At the age of fifteen, Ohíyesa was reunited with his father and oldest brother John in South Dakota. The father had converted to Christianity, after which he took the name of Jacob Eastman. John also converted and took the surname Eastman. The Eastman family established a homestead in Dakota Territory. When Ohíyesa accepted Christianity, he took the name Charles Alexander Eastman.

His father strongly supported his sons getting an education in European-American style schools. Eastman and his older brother John attended a mission then a preparatory school, Kimball Union Academy from 1882 to 1883, and college. Eastman first attended Beloit College and Knox College; he graduated from Dartmouth College in 1887. He attended medical school at Boston University, where he graduated in 1890 and was among the first Native Americans to be awarded a medical degree, just a year after Carlos Montezuma and Susan La Flesche Picotte earned their degrees.During that time, he also served as a medical doctor for the injured victims of the Wounded Knee Massacre.

His older brother John became a minister. Rev. John (Maȟpiyawaku Kida) Eastman served as a Presbyterian missionary at the Santee Dakota settlement of Flandreau, South Dakota.

== Career ==
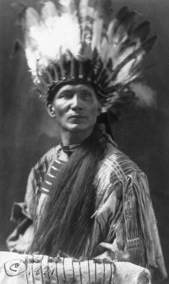
Dr. Charles A. Eastman (Ohiyesa)

=== Medical practice ===
Shortly after graduating from medical school, Charles Eastman returned to the West, where he worked as an agency physician for the Bureau of Indian Affairs (BIA) Indian Health Service on the Pine Ridge Reservation and later at the Crow Creek Reservation, both in South Dakota. He cared for Indians after the 1890 Wounded Knee massacre. Of the 38 or more victims he treated, only seven died. He later established a private medical practice after being forced out of his position, but was not able to make it succeed financially.

He married Elaine Goodale, a teacher from Massachusetts who, after serving as a teacher elsewhere in South Dakota, had been appointed as the first Supervisor of Education for the newly divided states of North and South Dakota. While they were struggling, she encouraged him to write some of the stories of his childhood. At her suggestion (and with her editing help), he published the first two stories in 1893 and 1894 in St. Nicholas Magazine. It had earlier published poetry of hers. These stories were collected in his first book, Indian Boyhood.

Eastman became active with the new organization of the YMCA, working to support Native American youth. Between 1894 and 1898, he established 32 Indian groups of the YMCA, and also founded leadership programs and outdoor youth camps. In 1899, he helped recruit students for the Carlisle Indian Industrial School in Pennsylvania, which had been established as the first Indian boarding school run by the federal government. Given his own education and career, he favored children learning more about mainstream American culture.

=== Writing ===
In 1902, Eastman published a memoir, Indian Boyhood, recounting his first 15 years of life among the Dakota Sioux during the later years of the nineteenth century. In the following two decades, he wrote ten more books, most concerned with his Native American culture. In the early 20th century, he was "one of the most prolific authors and speakers on Sioux ethnohistory and American Indian affairs." He also became one of the most photographed Native Americans, sometimes appearing in his traditional Sioux regalia and sometimes in Euro-American clothing.

Historians debate how Eastman and his wife worked together through the decades of his publishing career. Theodore Sargent, a biographer of Elaine, noted that Eastman gained acclaim for the nine books he published on Sioux life, whereas Elaine's seven books received little notice. According to Ruth Ann Alexander, Elaine is not given enough credit for his success, although she worked intensively on Charles's stories as a way both to share his life and to use her own literary talent as his typist and editor. Carol Lea Clark believes that the books under Eastman's name should be seen as a collaboration: "Together they produced works of a public popularity that neither could produce separately." After the couple separated in 1921, Eastman never published another book. These views, however, are contested by other Eastman scholars, who suggest they reflect a bias toward a European-American influence in Eastman's published works. Some Native scholars suggest that in fact, there is both content and style in Eastman's writing that reflects Indigenous techniques.

While Elaine may have helped Eastman edit his work, Ruth J. Heflin argues that Elaine's later claims that she wrote his works ring false. She did not make that claim until after Eastman's death. It is likely, however, that Elaine was her husband's typist; Eastman apparently did not learn to type. He was reported to have lost his government position because he could not type his required reports. Other scholars debate the influence and role Elaine might have played in shaping Charles’ prose.

Some of Eastman's books were translated into French, German, Czech and other European languages. They sold well enough to undergo regular reprints. In the early 21st century, a selection of his writings was published as The Essential Charles Eastman (Ohiyesa) (2007).

=== Youth organizations ===
Inspired by his writings, Ernest Thompson Seton sought Eastman's counsel in forming the Woodcraft Indians, which became a popular group for boys. The New York YMCA asked both Seton and Eastman to help them design YMCA Indian Scouts for urban boys, using rooftop gardens and city parks for their activities. In 1910, Seton invited Eastman to work with him and Daniel Carter Beard, of the Sons of Daniel Boone, to found the Boy Scouts of America (BSA). Luther Gulick also consulted with Eastman to assist him and his wife Charlotte to develop the Camp Fire Girls.

With his fame as an author and lecturer, Eastman promoted the fledgling Boy Scouts and Camp Fire Girls. He advised them on how to organize their summer camps, and directly managed one of the first Boy Scout camps along the shores of the Chesapeake Bay. In 1912, Eastman visited a number of northeastern camps at the invitation of camp directors seeking wilderness programming, including Adirondack Camp for Boys, founded by Dr. Elias G. Brown, on Lake George in New York. Eastman served as a BSA national councilman for many years.

His daughter, Irene, worked as a counselor at a Camp Fire Girl camp in Pittsburgh. In 1915, the Eastman family organized their own summer camp, Camp Oáhe, at Granite Lake, New Hampshire, where the whole family worked for years.

=== National spokesman ===
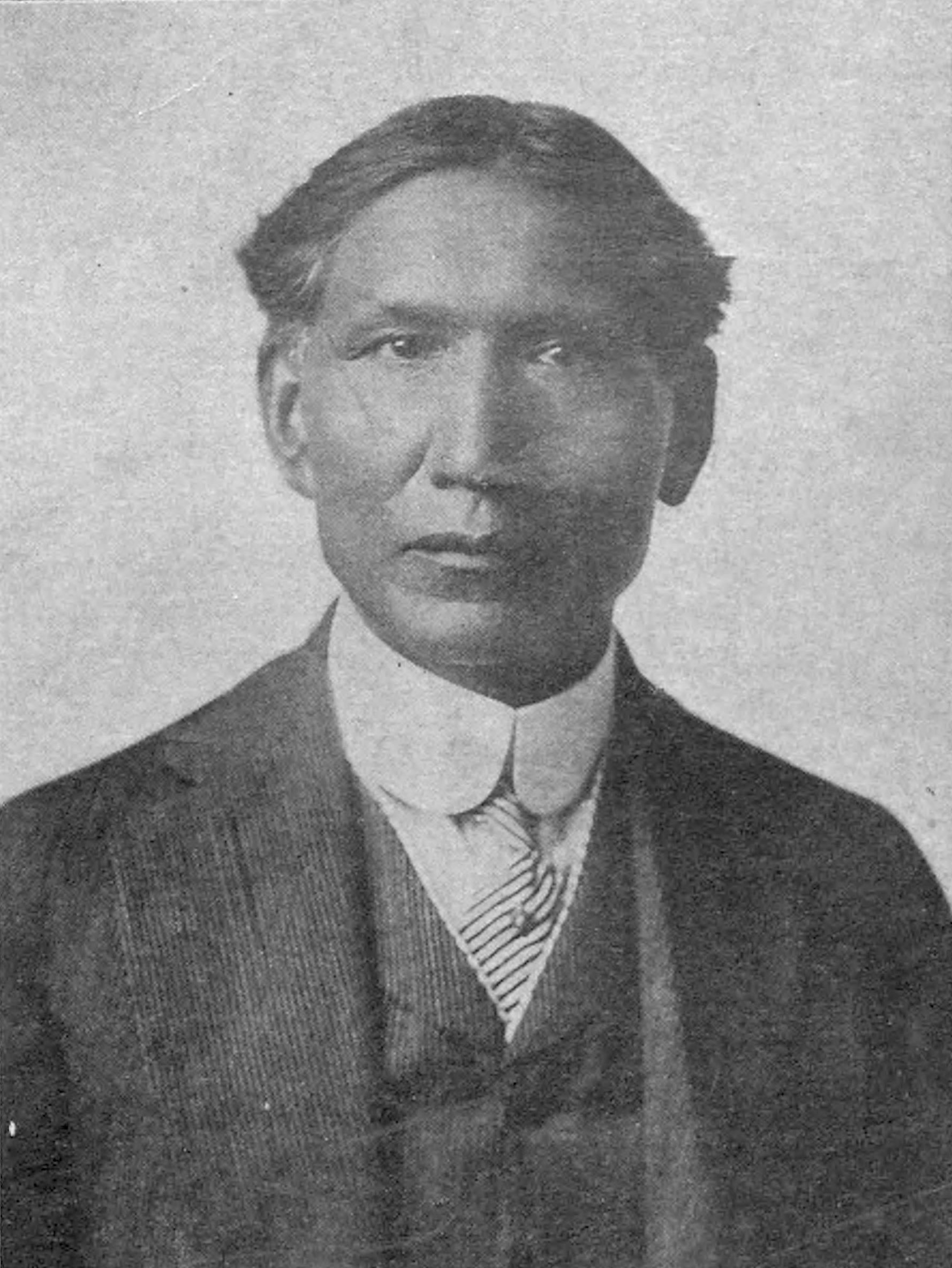
Magazine portrait of Dr. Charles A. Eastman, 1919

Eastman was active in national politics, particularly in matters dealing with Indian rights. He served as a lobbyist for the Santee Sioux between 1894 and 1897.

In 1903, President Theodore Roosevelt assigned Eastman to helping Sioux (Dakota, Nakota, Lakota) tribal members to choose English legal names, in order to prevent individuals and families from losing allotted lands due to confusion over cultural naming conventions and spellings. Eastman was one of the co-founders of the Society of American Indians (SAI), which pushed for freedom and self-determination for the American Indian.

In 1911, Eastman was chosen to represent the American Indian at the Universal Races Congress in London. Throughout his speeches and teachings, he emphasized the importance of seeking peace and living in harmony with nature.

From 1923 to 1925, Eastman served as an appointed US Indian inspector under President Calvin Coolidge. The Calvin Coolidge administration (1923-1929) invited Eastman to the Committee of 100, a reform panel examining federal institutions and activities dealing with Indian nations. The committee recommended that the government conduct an in-depth investigation into reservation life (health, education, economics, justice, civil rights, etc.). This was commissioned through the Department of Interior and conducted by the Brookings Institution, resulting in the groundbreaking 1928 Meriam Report. The findings and recommendations served as the basis of the Franklin D. Roosevelt administration's New Deal for the Indian, including the 1934 Indian Reorganization Act. This encouraged and supported tribes to establish self-government according to constitutional models.

In 1925, the Office of Indian Affairs asked Eastman to investigate the death and burial location of Sacagawea, the young woman who guided and interpreted for the Lewis and Clark Expedition in 1805. He determined that she died of old age at the Wind River Indian Reservation in Wyoming on April 9, 1884. However, based on a recently discovered journal of 1812–1813, modern historians believe that Sacagewea died in 1812 as a result of an illness following the birth of her daughter Lisette at Fort Lisa (North Dakota).

== Personal life ==
In 1891, Eastman married the poet and Indian welfare activist Elaine Goodale, who was serving as Superintendent of Indian Education for the Two Dakotas. From New England, she had first taught at Hampton Institute, which then had about 100 Native American students, in addition to African Americans, and at an Indian day school in South Dakota. She supported expanding day schools on reservations for education, rather than sending Native American children away from their families to boarding schools.

The Eastmans had six children together: five daughters and a son. The marriage prospered at first, and Elaine was always interested in Indian issues. Eastman's many jobs, failure to provide financially for the family, and absences on the lecture circuit, put increasing strain on the couple. In 1903, at Elaine's request, they returned to Massachusetts, where the family was based in Amherst.

Eastman was traveling extensively, and Elaine took over managing his public appearances. He lectured about twenty-five times a year across the country. These were productive years for their literary collaboration; he published eight books and she published three. She and Charles separated around 1921, following the death of their daughter Irene in 1918 from influenza during the 1918 flu pandemic. They never divorced or publicly acknowledged the separation.

Others have suggested their differing views on assimilation led to strain. Alexander said the catalyst was a rumor that Eastman had an affair with Henrietta Martindale, a visitor at their camp in 1921. He allegedly got her pregnant, after which he and Goodale separated. Although the paternity of this child, named Bonno by her mother, was never proven, letters from Henrietta and from Elaine strongly point to Charles Eastman as the father. The controversies over this child added to the Eastmans' decision to separate.

== Later life ==
Charles Eastman built a cabin on the eastern shore of Lake Huron, where he spent his later-year summers. He wintered in Detroit, Michigan with his only son Charles, Jr., also called Ohiyesa. On January 8, 1939, the senior Eastman died from heart failure in Detroit at age eighty. His interment was at Evergreen Cemetery in Detroit. In 1984, the Dartmouth Alumni Club and Eastman biographer Raymond Wilson donated a grave marker.

Elaine Goodale Eastman spent the remainder of her life living with two of her daughters and their families in Northampton, Massachusetts. Goodale Eastman died in 1953 and her ashes were scattered in the Spring Grove Cemetery in Northampton.

== Legacy and honors ==
- As a child, Ohiyesa had learned about herbal medicine from his grandmother. His education in Western-style medicine from medical school might have enabled him to draw from both sides of his heritage in practicing as a doctor, but he consistently refused to offer up fake "Indian potions" or other so-called cures as were often advertised in the newspapers of the day.
- He was the only Native American person invited to speak at the First Universal Races Congress in London in 1911.
- His several books document Sioux Dakota culture at the end of the nineteenth century.
- In 1933, Eastman was the first person to receive the Indian Achievement Award.
- A crater on Mercury was named for him.

=== Film portrayal ===
- In the HBO film Bury My Heart at Wounded Knee (2007), Eastman was portrayed at different ages by the actors Adam Beach and Chevez Ezaneh.
- The Vision Maker Media documentary OHIYESA The Soul of an Indian (2018), follows Kate Beane, a young Dakota woman, as she traces the life of her celebrated relative, Charles Eastman (Ohiyesa).

== Works ==
=== Autobiography ===
- Eastman, Charles Alexander (1902). Indian Boyhood. New York: McClure, Phillips & Co.
- —— (1916). From the Deep Woods to Civilization: Chapters in the Autobiography of an Indian. Boston: Little, Brown.

=== Legends ===
- —— (1904). Red Hunters and Animal People. Harper and Brothers.
- —— (1905). The Madness of Bald Eagle. Hampton, VA: Hampton Institute. Archived from the original on January 16, 2003.
- —— (1907). Old Indian Days. McClure.
- Eastman, Charles Alexander; Eastman, Elaine Goodale (1909). Wigwam Evenings: Sioux Folk Tales Retold. Little, Brown.
- Eastman, Charles Alexander; Eastman, Elaine Goodale (1910). Smoky Day's Wigwam Evenings. Brown, Little.

=== Non-fiction ===
- —— (1911). The Soul of the Indian: An Interpretation. Houghton.
- —— (1913). Indian Child Life. Little, Brown.
- —— (1914). Indian Scout Talks: A Guide for Scouts and Campfire Girls. Little, Brown. (retitled Indian Scout Craft and Lore, Dover Publications). A 1914 reviewer writes, "If one should follow this guide, one would soon begin to doubt he is a white man".
- —— (1915). The Indian To-day: The Past and Future of the Red American. Doubleday-Page.
- —— (1918). Indian Heroes and Great Chieftains. Little, Brown. Also Online at Webroots.

== See also ==
- Black Elk
- Bone Wars
- Chief Joseph
- Crazy Horse
- Geronimo
- Red Cloud
- Sitting Bull
- List of writers from peoples indigenous to the Americas
- Native American Studies
- I Remain Alive: the Sioux Literary Renaissance
