= Seth Eastman =

American artist (1808–1875)

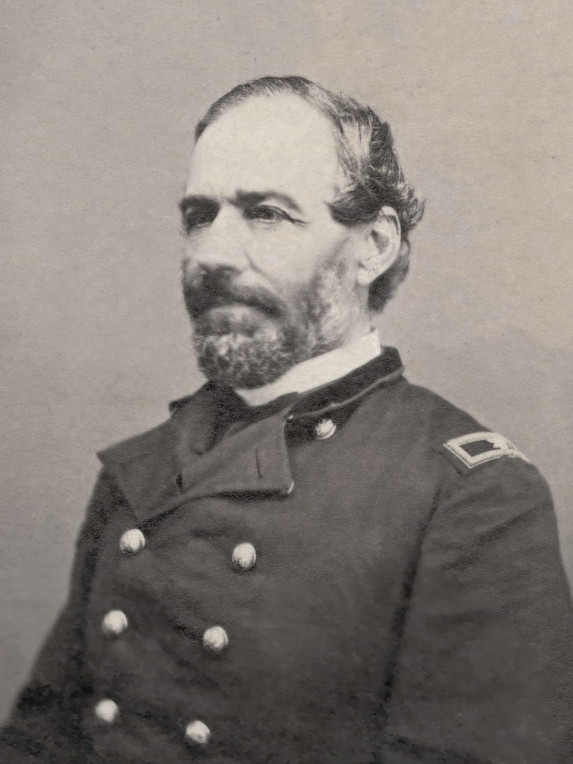
- Eastman, c. 1860
- Born: January 24, 1808; Brunswick, Maine, U.S.
- Died: August 31, 1875 (aged 67); Washington, D.C., U.S.
- Burial place: Oak Hill Cemetery; Washington, D.C., U.S.
- Spouse(s): Wakan Inajin-win (m. 1830–1832) Mary Henderson Eastman
- Children: Frank, Virginia, John McC, Harry
- Relatives: Charles Eastman (grandson)
- Military career
- Allegiance: United States of America; Union
- Branch: United States Army; Union Army
- Service years: 1829–1867; 1867-1870
- Rank: Lieutenant colonel Brevet Brigadier General
- Conflicts: American Civil War

Seth Eastman (January 24, 1808– August 31, 1875) was an artist and West Point graduate who served in the U.S. Army, first as a mapmaker and illustrator. He had two tours at Fort Snelling, Minnesota Territory; during the second, extended tour he was commanding officer of the fort. During these years, he painted many studies of Native American life. He was notable for the quality of his hundreds of illustrations for Henry Rowe Schoolcraft's six-volume study on the history of Indian tribes of the United States, commissioned by the U.S. Congress.

Eastman and his second wife Mary Henderson Eastman (1818 – 1887) were instrumental in recording Native American life. From their time at Fort Snelling, Mary Henderson Eastman wrote a book about Dakota Sioux life and culture, which Seth Eastman illustrated. In 1838, he was elected into the National Academy of Design as an Honorary Academician.

Seth Eastman retired as a lieutenant colonel and brevet brigadier general for disability during the American Civil War. He was later reactivated when commissioned by Congress to make several paintings for the United States Capitol. Between 1867 and 1869, Eastman painted a series of nine scenes of American Indian life for the House Committee on Indian Affairs. In 1870, Congress commissioned Eastman to create a series of seventeen paintings of important U.S. forts, to be hung in the meeting rooms of the House Committee on Military Affairs. He completed the paintings in 1875, and eight still hang in the Senate Wing.

== Early life and education ==
Seth Eastman was born on January 24, 1808, in Brunswick, Maine, the eldest of thirteen children of Robert and Sarah Lee Eastman. He was sixteen when he entered the United States Military Academy at West Point in 1824. Part of his studies included training in technical draftsmanship from the French miniature painter and engraver Thomas Gimbrede. He graduated twenty-second in his class and received his commission on July 1, 1829, entering the Army as a second lieutenant in the 1st Infantry Regiment.

== Career ==
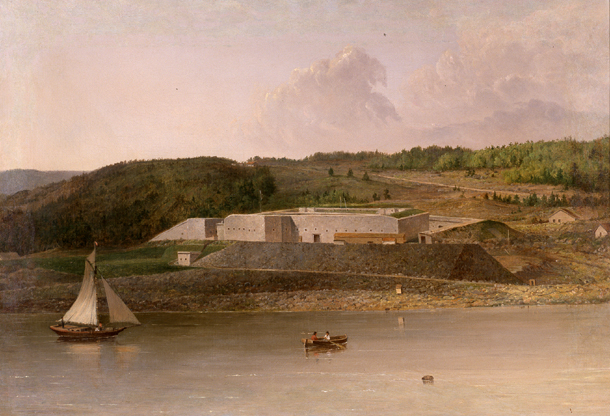
Painting of Fort Knox, Maine

Eastman made his career with the U.S. Army. He became an accomplished artist and used his skills in mapmaking and recording Army activities. In 1830 he was assigned to Fort Snelling near what became Minneapolis. A large installation with twenty officers and up to 300 enlisted men, the fort was deep in American Indian territory on the upper Mississippi River. While stationed there for three years, Eastman learned the Sioux language and captured many scenes of American Indian life in the territory. He painted and sketched prolifically.

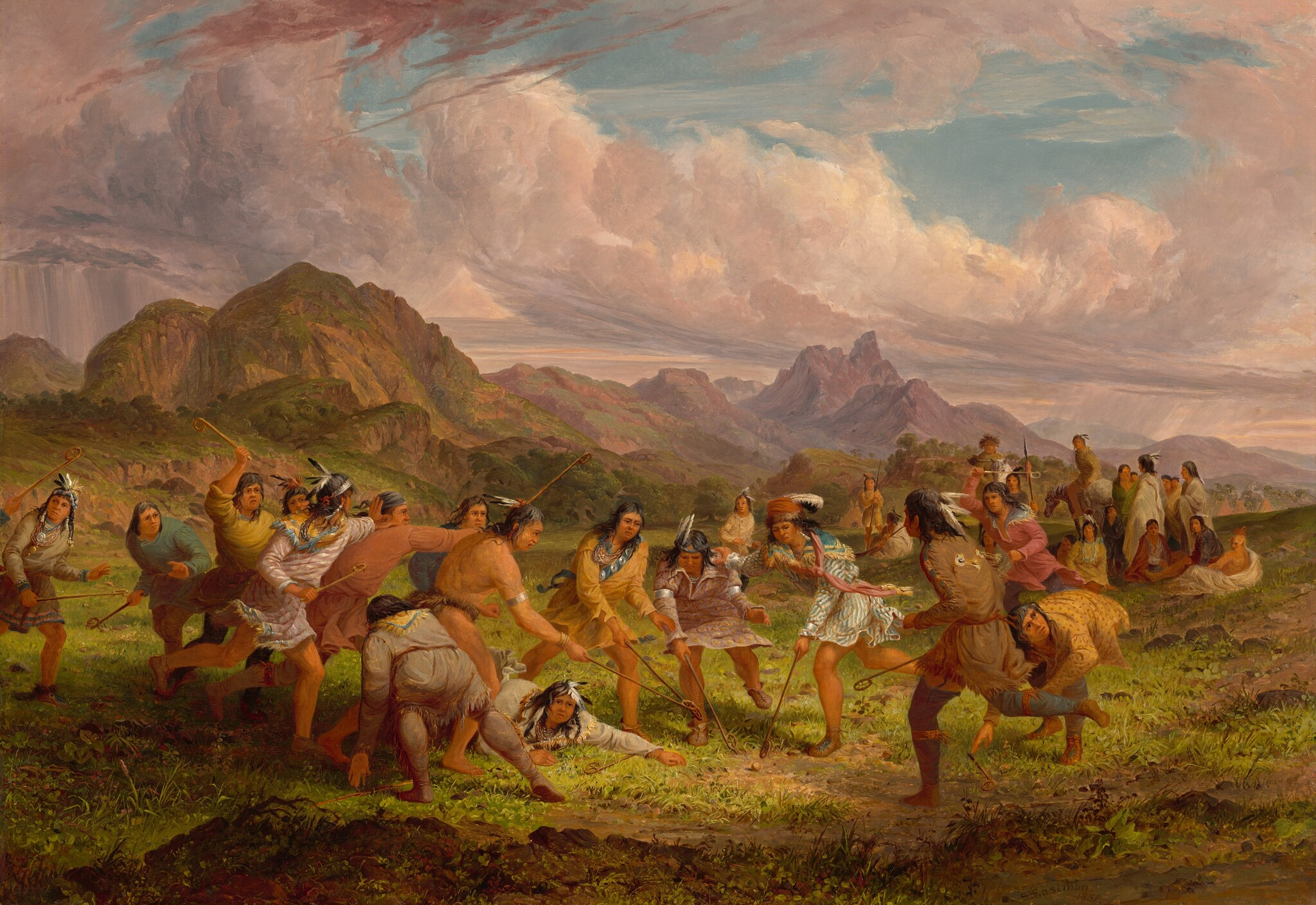
Ball Playing among the Sioux Indians, 1851

From 1833 to 1840, Eastman was assigned to West Point, where he taught drawing (used for mapmaking). In 1841, Eastman was appointed commander of Fort Snelling and returned to Minnesota. While stationed there for several years with his second wife and growing family, he continued to study and paint Native American life. Their son Frank was born in 1844, daughter Virginia in 1847, and son John in 1849. He learned much about the Dakota culture particularly. He painted and drew pictures of the Sioux villages of Kaposia and Little Crow, as well as settlements in present-day Scott, Wabasha, and Winona counties.

Hearing that Congress had authorized a study of Indians by the explorer and former U.S. Indian agent Henry Rowe Schoolcraft, Eastman asked to be assigned as illustrator. Finally in 1849 at age 41, he had the chance. Captain Eastman and his family settled in Washington, where their son Harry was born in 1854.

Eastman began to work on what would be hundreds of pictures to illustrate the massive Schoolcraft study, published in six volumes from 1851 to 1857.

It was a monumental work that for Eastman consumed five years. During that time, he completed some 275 pages of illustrations to accompany Schoolcraft's six-volume Information Regarding the History, Conditions, and Prospects of the Indian Tribes of the United States. Volume I was published in early 1851. His precise and exquisitely executed illustrations of Indian life, painted almost entirely from his frontier sketches, proved that he was singularly the best-qualified person in the country to undertake this epic work.

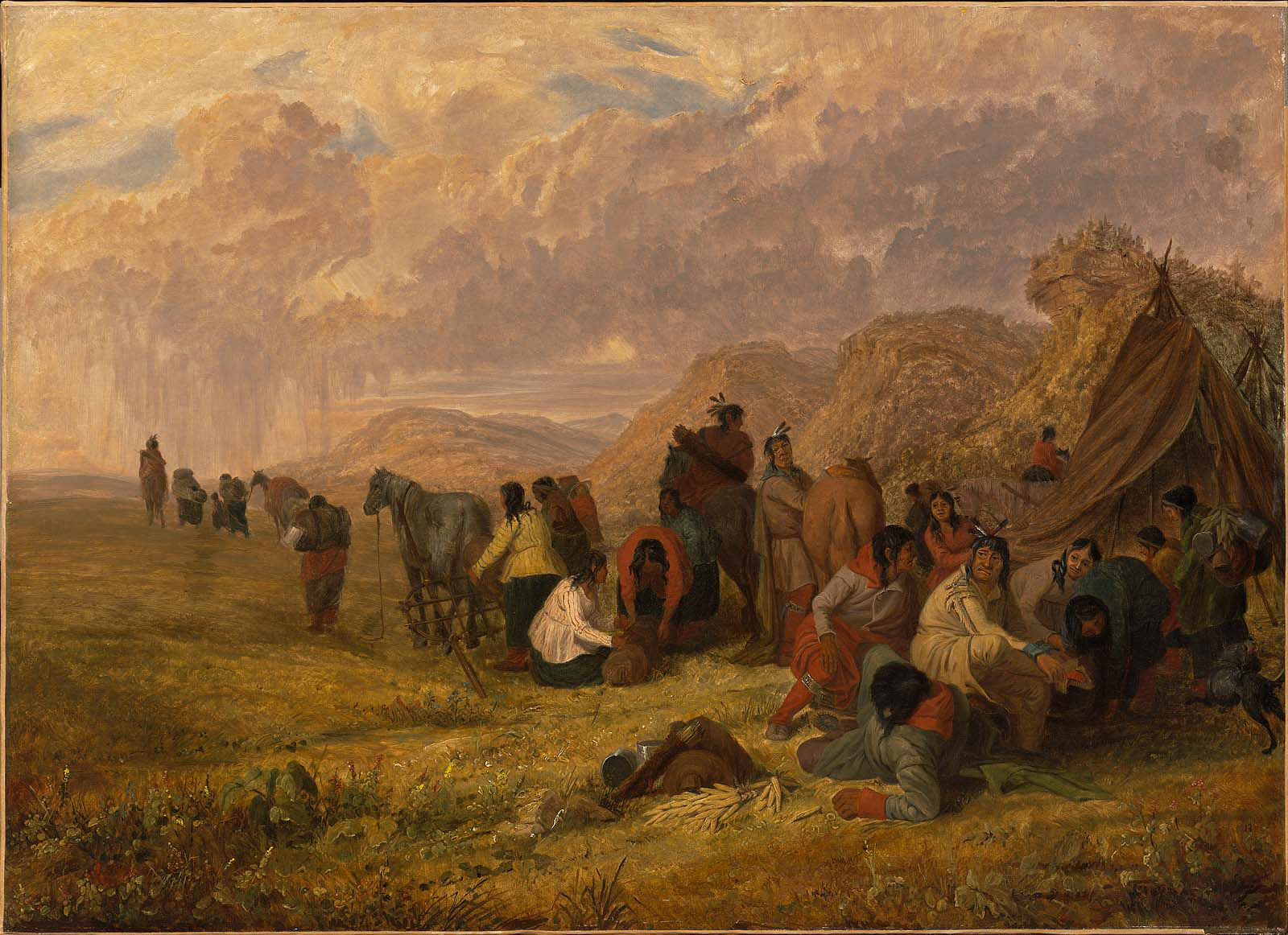
Sioux Indians Breaking Up Camp, 1848

Eastman's work, which complements the work of Hudson River School landscape painters of his era, illustrates how images of the landscape supported and extended the United States' work of empire building. That is, the images of Americans' possession and domination of the landscape supported their mission of empire. Eastman's images recorded the empire's reach into the northwest and helped spur it on. In this regard, Eastman was working on a similar mission to the landscape painters who were working from private commissions. Near the end of his career, at the rank of lieutenant colonel, Eastman was commissioned by the House Committee on Military Affairs to paint pictures of seventeen important forts. He completed these paintings between 1870 and 1875. One controversial painting was Death Whoop, which was twice removed from display because of negative comments from viewers, as it portrayed an Indian's scalping a white man. In the 1930s the paintings were displayed again in the U.S. Capitol Building.

=== Works ===
- Seth Eastman, Treatise on Topographical Drawing, New York: Wiley and Putnam, 1837. His textbook on the techniques of map-making and map-reading was made mandatory for all topography classes at West Point. Eastman created symbols for use on all maps, and explained how to draw height, width, and depth on a two-dimensional sheet of paper.
- Henry Rowe Schoolcraft, Historical and Statistical Information Regarding the History, Conditions, and Prospects of the Indian Tribes of the United States (six volumes), Illustrated by Seth Eastman, Philadelphia, Pennsylvania: J. B. Lippincott & Co., 1851–1857.
- Memoir of General Seth Eastman, U.S. Army, Washington, D.C.: [s.n.], 1875. He recounted his life in the military, his art, his second wife Mary and their children. He did not mention his first wife Stand Sacred, daughter of a Dakota chief, or their daughter Winona, whom he left when reassigned.

== Marriage and family ==
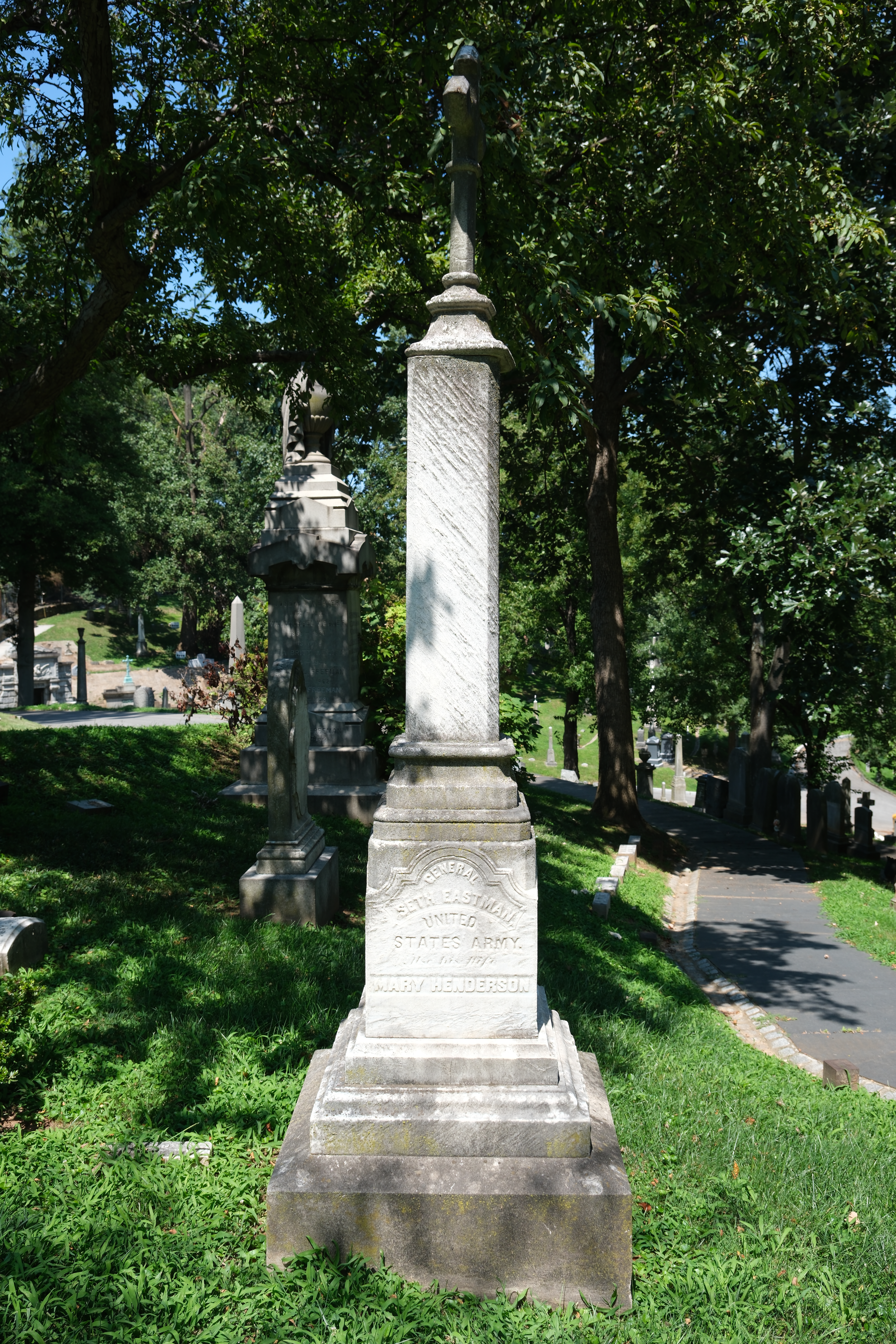
Grave of Eastman at Oak Hill Cemetery

During his first posting at Fort Snelling, Seth Eastman in 1830 married Wakan Inajin-win (Stands Sacred), the fifteen-year-old daughter of Cloud Man, a Dakotah (Santee Sioux) chief of French and Dakota ancestry, and his Dakota wife. Eastman was reassigned from Fort Snelling in 1832, soon after the birth of their daughter Winona (meaning First-born daughter). He declared his marriage ended when he was reassigned, as was typical of many European-American men who abandoned Indian women and their children. His daughter Winona was also known as Mary Nancy Eastman.

Later, Winona was named Wakantakawin in the Sioux tradition of marking life passages. She married a Santee Sioux and had five children with him, dying at the birth of the youngest, later known as Charles. After adopting Christianity following the Dakota War of 1862, her husband and two of their surviving sons took the Eastman surname. Winona's eldest son, John (Marpiyawaku Kida) Eastman, became a Presbyterian missionary at Flandreau, South Dakota. Her youngest son, Charles Eastman, was one of the first Native Americans certified as a medical doctor, after earning his degree at Boston University. After returning to the West, where he served the government as a doctor at the Pine Ridge Reservation, he married Elaine Goodale, a European-American teacher from New England who was superintendent of the Indian schools in the region. Charles Eastman later worked for Native American rights. He also wrote several popular books about growing up in Dakota culture; some were translated into European languages and published on the Continent.

In 1835, while stationed at West Point, Seth Eastman married a second time, to Mary Henderson, daughter of a Southern surgeon and granddaughter of Commodore Thomas Truxton. She and her family were from Warrenton, Virginia. The couple had five children together, some born during Eastman's extended assignment in the West when he returned to Fort Snelling for seven years as commanding officer. The couple were both interested in Dakota culture. Mary Eastman collected traditional stories and legends during their time at Fort Snelling, as preparation for a later book which her husband illustrated.

Eastman is buried at Oak Hill Cemetery in Washington, D.C.

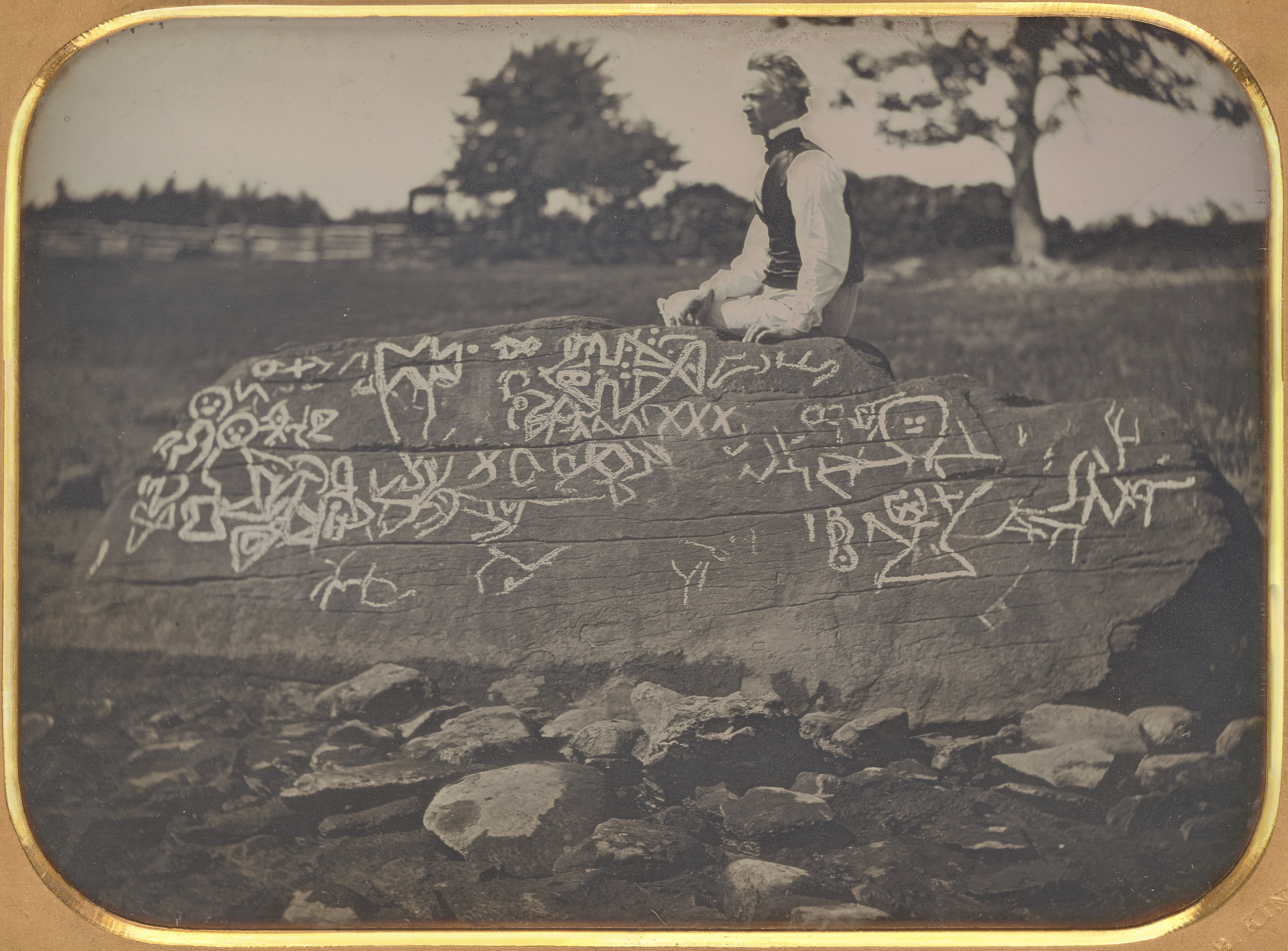
Seth Eastman on Dighton Rock (1853)

== See also ==
- Elbridge Ayer Burbank
- George Catlin
- Paul Kane
- W. Langdon Kihn
- Charles Bird King
- Joseph Henry Sharp
- John Mix Stanley
