= Elias G. Brown =

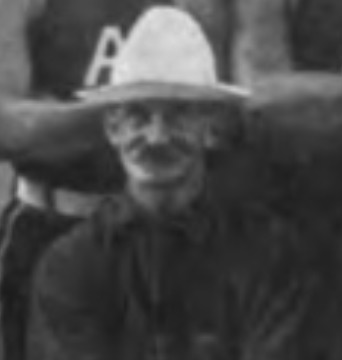
- Elias G. Brown, founder of Adirondack Camp for Boys, c. 1917
- Born: 1871; New York City, New York
- Died: June 28, 1921; New York City, New York
- Education: Columbia University (B.A., 1893); College of Physicians and Surgeons (M.D., 1895)
- Occupations: Physician, educator, camp director
- Known for: Founder of Adirondack Camp for Boys; President of the Camp Directors Association of America
- Spouse: Adelaide Day (m. 1916)

Elias Galley Brown (1871 – June 28, 1921) was an American physician, educator, and early figure in the organized summer camp movement. He founded Adirondack Camp for Boys on Lake George in New York in 1904 and served as president of the Camp Directors Association of America from 1911 to 1912.

== Early life and education ==
Brown was born in 1871 in New York City. He received a Bachelor of Arts from Columbia University in 1893 and his medical degree from the College of Physicians and Surgeons in 1895, receiving his New York medical license in 1896.

After leaving medical practice, Brown became a psychological expert for the New York City Board of Education and later served as principal of a private school. He developed an early interest in organized camping, serving six years as camp physician at Camp Dudley on Lake Champlain — one of the oldest boys' camps in the United States — and afterward as physician at three additional camps.

== Adirondack Camp for Boys ==
In 1904, Brown founded Adirondack Camp for Boys at Glenburnie on Lake George in the Adirondack Mountains of New York, beginning with eight campers. The camp was among the earliest organized children's camps on Lake George. Between 1900 and 1910, at least nine boys' camps were established in the Adirondacks, most on Lake Champlain or Lake George, and Adirondack Camp is one of only two from that era still in operation.

Brown articulated his philosophy of organized camping in the camp's brochure: "Observe the boy at even a first-class summer hotel. There may be something for him to do much of the time, but what does he learn, and how is he better at the end of the summer?" The brochure continued: "The boys will learn the signs of the woods, trail following, camp making, cooking, and how to take care of themselves. These experiences are greatly enjoyed, and are invaluable in developing character and ability to get along."

By 1924 the camp had become the official summer program of the Buckley School of New York City.

In March 1916, Brown married Adelaide Day, daughter of Mrs. Frances L. Day of Brooklyn, at a ceremony officiated by the Rev. Dr. James Farrar of the Dutch Reformed Church. The couple honeymooned at Lake George. Brown died on June 28, 1921, in New York City, from cancer of the stomach, aged 50. His wife, Adelaide Brown, continued to own and manage the camp until 1946. She sold it to Colonel William H. Warrick, who had previously served as the camp's director before entering Army service in February 1941 and who later became the longtime commandant of the Knickerbocker Greys youth cadet corps in Manhattan. The sale was completed on September 7, 1946, at the office of Judge S. P. Wickes in Ticonderoga, New York.

== The Mountain School ==
In addition to Adirondack Camp for Boys, Brown founded and directed The Mountain School in Allaben, New York, a year-round college preparatory school for boys aged eight and older. The school occupied 300 acres in the Catskills at an elevation of 2,000 feet.

The Mountain School was designed as a fully open-air institution — pupils spent twenty-four hours a day outdoors regardless of weather, with a special costume adopted to keep boys comfortable in cold conditions. Brown personally conducted a physical examination of each boy upon enrollment and re-examined them monthly, overseeing each student's exercise, bathing, diet, and rest. Academic instruction was provided by college graduates.

By its sixth year of operation in 1913, the school reported increased enrollment. A map in the Adirondack Camp brochure shows both institutions — the camp at Lake George and The Mountain School in the Catskills — as complementary parts of a unified educational program accessible by train from New York City.

== Role in the Organized Camping Movement ==
Brown was among a cohort of early camp directors who argued that summers at resort hotels left wealthy boys unchallenged and poorly served. The American Camp Association has noted that Brown's camp brochure echoed the founding philosophy of Ernest Balch, who had established Camp Chocorua in New Hampshire in 1881 as one of the earliest organized private boys' camps in the United States, on the premise that boys needed wilderness experience and self-reliance rather than resort leisure. By 1900, Adirondack camps were among the most influential and well known in the country, and Adirondack camp directors took active roles in the national movement.

Brown was among the founding cohort of the Camp Directors Association of America, established in New York in 1910 as the first national professional body for camp directors in the United States and the direct predecessor of the American Camp Association. The organization's founding mission was to standardize the organized camp experience for the young — a cause Brown had been advancing through his own program at Adirondack Camp since 1904.

Brown served as the organization's second president from 1911 to 1912, just one year after its founding, when its membership and standards were still being established. Brown was among a group that included Herman Beckman of Camp Dudley and Frank S. Hackett of Camp Riverdale, all of whom served as officers of the national organization and were regular contributors to industry journals.

== Legacy ==
Brown's camp brochure articulated a philosophy of character development through nature and communal living that aligned with the values the organized camping movement was then forming at a national level. Adirondack Camp is one of only two children's camps established in the Adirondacks between 1900 and 1910 still in continuous operation today.

The Order of the Adirondack Camp Eagle, established by Brown in 1909, recognized camper achievement across bronze, silver, and gold tiers and is among the oldest continuously awarded honors in American summer camping. Brown designed the award to be age-neutral, writing that "it is not arranged so that physical strength or size or age is a determining factor. Even the youngest boy in camp may make the golden eagle."

The camp Elais G. Brown founded in 1904 remained in the Brown family for 42 years until his widow Adelaide Brown sold to Colonel William H. Warrick in 1946. It continues to operate today as Adirondack Camp, a coeducational overnight camp on Lake George.

== See also ==
- American Camp Association
- Camp Dudley
- Frank S. Hackett
- Lake George (New York)
- History of summer camps in the United States
- Knickerbocker Greys
- William H. Warrick
- Buckley School
- Chocorua Island Chapel
