= The Essential Charles Eastman (Ohiyesa) =

Book by Charles Eastman

- Author: Charles Eastman
- Language: English
- Publisher: World Wisdom
- Publication date: 2007
- Publication place: United States
- Media type: Print (hardback and paperback)
- Pages: 227
- ISBN: 978-1-933316-33-8
- Dewey Decimal: 299/.7852 22
- LC Class: E98.R3 E147 2007

The Essential Charles Eastman (Ohiyesa) (2007, World Wisdom) is a compilation of the writings of Charles Eastman. A 19th-century Native American author and activist, Eastman lived both in the world of the Santee Dakota and the world of contemporary non-Indian America. His writings are of historical significance, providing a glimpse of Native American life during a turbulent time, as well as an explanation of the spiritual traditions of the Sioux people.

== Awards ==
- Winner - Silver Midwest Book Award for “Religion/Philosophy/Inspiration” (2007)

== See also ==
- List of writers from peoples indigenous to the Americas
- Native American studies
