= Death Whoop =

Painting by Seth Eastman

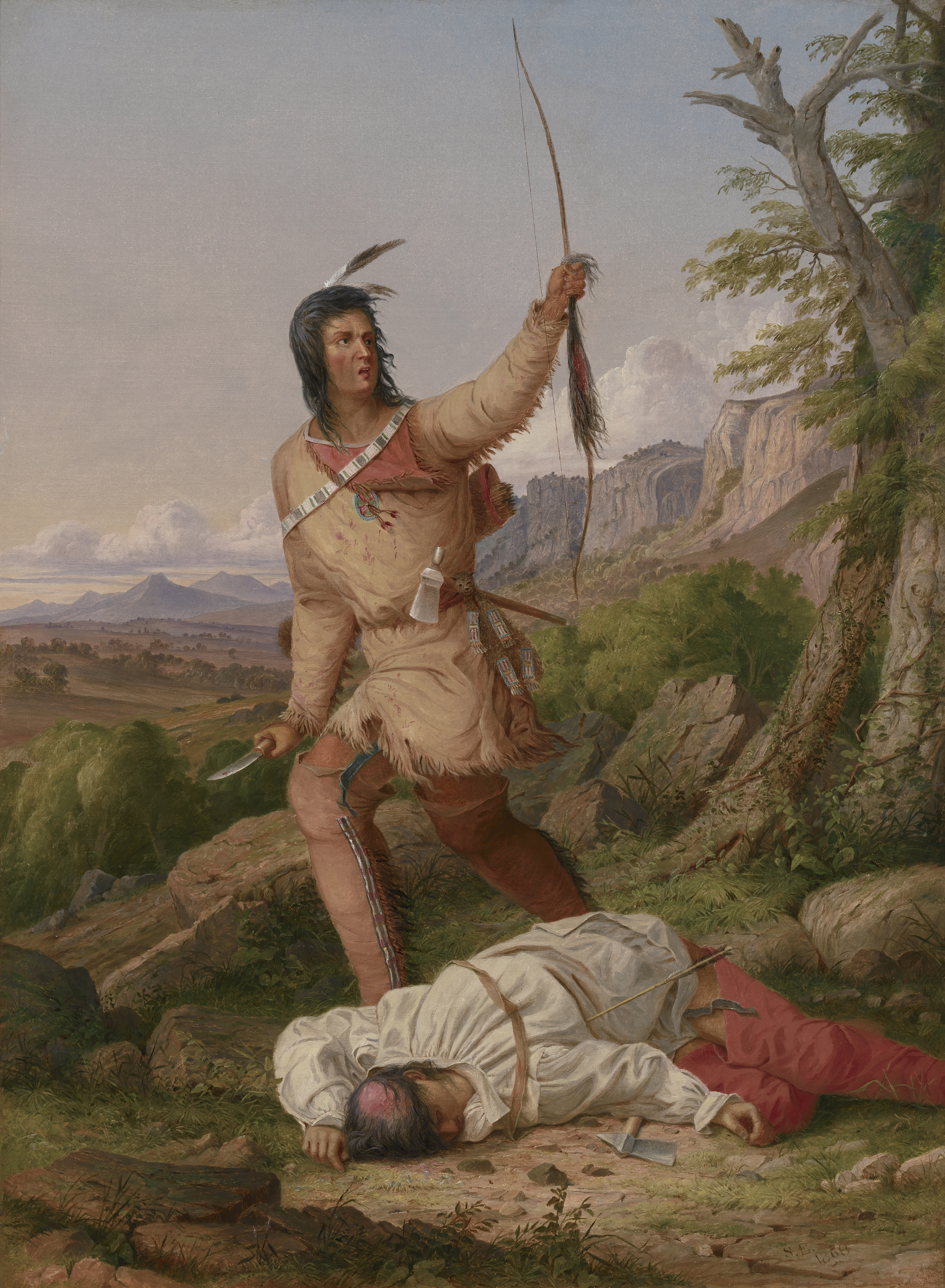
Death Whoop by Seth Eastman

Death Whoop is an oil on canvas painting by American artist and career Army officer Seth Eastman. It depicts a Native American warrior holding up the scalp of a white person.

It was one of a collection of 17 Eastman paintings commissioned in 1870 by the United States Congress, the House Committee on Military Affairs. These were hung in the committee room and halls. Because people found it disturbing at a time of continued American Indian Wars, the painting was twice removed from public view in the 19th century. It was reinstalled in the Capitol in the 1930s.

Under an earlier commission by Congress, Eastman had painted hundreds of illustrations for Henry Rowe Schoolcraft's major six-volume study, Indian Tribes of the United States, published 1851–1857. Eastman's many paintings and drawings of the Dakota and Ojibwe done during tours at Fort Snelling in the early 1830s and several years in the 1840s comprise an important state resource of Dakota culture.
