= YMCA of Metropolitan Chattanooga =

The YMCA of Metropolitan Chattanooga is the Young Men's Christian Association branch in the Chattanooga, Tennessee area. It includes 8 branches and over 120 program sites in the Chattanooga area. The YMCA of Metropolitan Chattanooga is a chapter of the national YMCA-USA.

In 2016, YMCA of Metropolitan Chattanooga served more than 250,000 meals to area youth through its feeding programs.

== Branches ==
The branches that make up the YMCA of Metropolitan Chattanooga are:

- Downtown Family YMCA
- Hamilton Family YMCA
- Cleveland Family YMCA
- Healthy Living Center at North River
- North Georgia Community YMCA
- J.A. Henry Family YMCA
- Y-CAP
- Camp Ocoee
