= Irene Eastman =

American singer

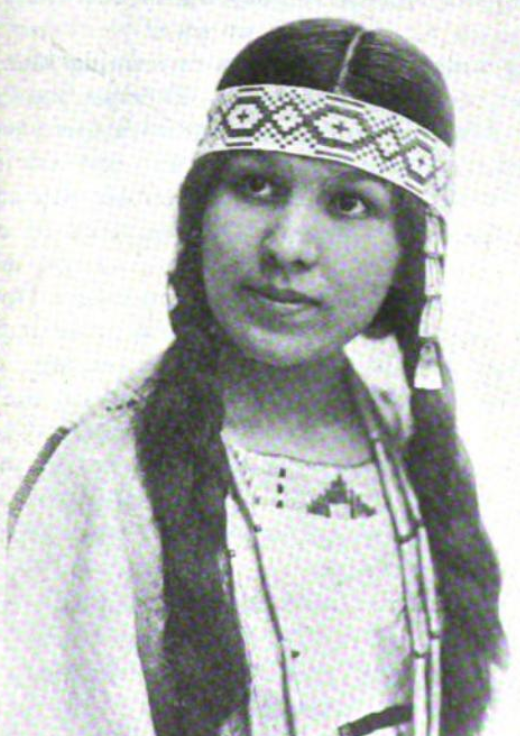
- Irene Eastman, from a 1917 magazine
- Born: February 24, 1894; St. Paul, Minnesota
- Died: October 23, 1918 (aged 24); Keene, New Hampshire
- Other name: Taluta
- Occupation: Singer
- Parent(s): Charles Eastman, Elaine Goodale Eastman

Irene Taluta Eastman (February 24, 1894 – October 23, 1918) was an American singer.

== Early life and education ==
Irene Eastman was born in Saint Paul, Minnesota, one of the six children of Charles Eastman and Elaine Goodale Eastman. Her father was a noted physician and a Santee Sioux born in Minnesota; her mother was a white writer and educator from Massachusetts. Her parents met at Wounded Knee.

== Career ==
Eastman, a soprano, sang, danced, and told stories in various venues, including the Buffalo Society of Natural Sciences Hampton Institute, historical societies, community groups, and opera houses. She dressed in a leather beaded costume for her performances.

The music Eastman performed was not from any one specific Native tradition, but a pastiche that evoked an idea of Native cultures for non-Native audiences. "The stories were put to classical notes, and especially harmoniously arranged with all admirable Indian atmosphere saved", explained a 1915 report. Hamlin Garland wrote to Eastman's mother that her "charming presence and sweet and sympathetic voice gave even the dullest of her hearers a realizing sense of the wild beauty which had its place in a world that is almost gone."

== Personal life ==
Eastman died in 1918 from influenza, during the worldwide flu pandemic, at the age of 24. Her parents separated soon after her death. There is an oil portrait of Eastman by Wallace Bryant, in the collection of the Hood Museum of Art at Dartmouth College.
