= YMCA of Metropolitan Detroit =

Nonprofit organization based in Detroit, Michigan

YMCA of Metropolitan Detroit is a nonprofit organization in the Detroit, Michigan area. As an affiliate of the YMCA of the USA, it offers programs for families and youth such as sports, camps, and classes. At its six branches, it operates fitness centers with swimming pools and gymnasiums available to members. It also operates two overnight camps, one in Northern Michigan and one in Oakland County.

In 2025, the organization had a budget of about $25.9 million, employed 711 staff, and served 60,000 individuals with programs and services.

== History ==
=== 1851 to 1970 ===
The Detroit Young Men's Christian Association was founded in 1851, but the organization did not prosper until after the Civil War. It was reestablished in 1867. A dedicated YMCA building was built at the corner of Griswold and Grand River in 1887. It housed the first swimming pool in the city.

Downtown Detroit YMCA, 1909

For many years, the nucleus of YMCA of Metropolitan Detroit was its nine-story building in downtown Detroit, built in 1909. Architecture firm Donaldson and Meier designed it for an era when YMCAs offered housing for transient men. The building had 120 beds, although it was initially for whites only. A branch for Black men, the St. Antoine Street branch, was located in the city's Black Bottom neighborhood. The downtown branch housed men until it closed in 1997. It was demolished to make way for construction of Ford Field and Comerica Park.

YMCA also operated the Railroad Branch, established in southwest Detroit in 1876 to provide leisure space and beds exclusively for traveling railroad workers. Initially renting space in railroad property, in 1900 it built a permanent building on Livernois Avenue near the railroad yard. It closed in 1958.

Between 1916 and 1924, six neighborhood branches were established across Detroit. Throughout the 1920s, the YMCA built large buildings to house the branches. As the organization was flourishing, the Metropolitan Offices of the YMCA of Metropolitan Detroit (its official original name) was established in 1921 for administrative purposes. As of 1950, YMCA of Metropolitan Detroit operated two post-secondary educational buildings, the Detroit Institute of Technology and Detroit College of Law (absorbed into Michigan State University in 1995), and operated eight other branches in the city.

YMCA Railroad Branch

City of Detroit Locations Operated by YMCA as of 1950
Location	Address	Built
Railroad Branch	Livernois at Southern Avenue, Detroit	1900
Downtown Branch	2020 Witherell, Detroit	1909
Detroit Institute of Technology	John R at Elizabeth Street, Detroit	1917
St. Antoine Street Branch	635 E. Elizabeth, Detroit	1925
Northern Branch	13220 Woodward, Highland Park	1927
Western Branch	1601 Clark, Detroit	1928
Hannan Branch	10401 E. Jefferson, Detroit	1928
Fisher Branch	2051 West Grand Boulevard, Detroit	1929
Northeastern Branch	10100 Harper Avenue, Detroit	1931
Detroit College of Law	130 E. Elizabeth, Detroit	1937

In addition, five suburban branches were established between 1944 and 1950. The branches were small, often in temporary quarters like old houses, and offered activities for youth and community meeting spaces. For example, as of the 1950s, Royal Oak's YMCA branch offered teens and young men places to play cue sports, darts and table tennis in a wholesome environment, but was too small to offer beds or fitness facilities. In July 1957, the YMCA Foundation for Metropolitan Detroit was formed to raise and administer funds to pay for the nonprofit's growth in the region.

The YMCA sponsored sports like basketball and swimming, but the YMCAs of one hundred years ago did not contain treadmills or weight training machines as they do today. But by the 1950s, many Y branches had weight training rooms, weightlifting clubs, and physical conditioning programs. The Detroit Free Press describes the fitness center at Detroit's Northern branch in 1959: "Paying only an initiation fee of $3 that helps keep their weights segregated in a separate room and nicely painted, members usually straggle in for workouts at the rate of about 30 a day."

=== 1970 to present ===
As exercise gained popularity in the 1970s, YMCAs became more like health clubs. In 1979, $600,000 was invested in the downtown Detroit branch specifically to build exercise and activities rooms, expand the men's locker room, and build five courts for handball and racquetball, popular sports at the time. Seven branches also had racquetball courts, including the Royal Oak and Birmingham branches, which had four courts each.

As of 1996, there were 15 YMCAs across Metro Detroit. At that time, its buildings were on average fifty years old, and maintenance and modernization costs strained the nonprofit. The Highland Park branch, built in 1927, was one branch that closed due to the organization prioritizing services rather than building upkeep.

Boll Family YMCA, downtown Detroit

Four new branches were constructed between 2002 and 2005, including a new downtown Detroit branch. Ground was broken for it on October 30, 2003, six years after the demolition of its predecessor. The delay was due to fundraising difficulties, but the city assisted by authorizing the YMCA to issue tax-free bonds. In late 2005, the building opened as the Boll Family YMCA to honor a donor. Architecture firm SmithGroup planned six partial floors, interlocking via a central stair, in a building about four stories high. John Gallagher, Detroit Free Press architecture critic, praised the design as "a remarkably open, light-filled series of interior stages. While each individual space is thoughtfully designed and amply equipped, now each one seems to spill over visually into the next."

The organization lost over 1,000 members between 2007 and 2008 as a result of the Great Recession. It had 32,780 members as of January 2008. Due to the COVID-19 pandemic in 2020, membership declined and the organization struggled financially, closing three locations during 2020 and 2021. In 2025, revenue exceeded expenses for the first time since before the pandemic.

== Locations ==
Location name	Address
Boll Family YMCA	1401 Broadway, Detroit
YMCA's flagship downtown Detroit location opened on December 5, 2005. Intended to replace the demolished 1909 YMCA, the facility is named after the Boll Family, who made a large donation to the project. The building features a 200-seat theater, two swimming pools, and a 38-foot climbing wall. The building has six stories and cost $32 million.
Carls Family YMCA	300 Family Drive, Milford
Opened May 25, 2002. Milford's YMCA has a water-play area and pool slide for families. It was built without handball or racquetball courts, a feature of older branches, indicating the decline of those sports.
Downriver Family YMCA	16777 Northline Road, Southgate
The Southgate YMCA was built in 2003 to replace the aging branch in Wyandotte. Construction was funded by the city of Southgate, with an agreement that YMCA would operate it. The location has a rock climbing wall and indoor and outdoor pools, including a water slide.
Farmington Family YMCA	28100 Farmington Road, Farmington Hills
Constructed in 1980 during the health club boom, this location was part of a new generation of YMCAs that featured a greater variety of fitness machines to compete with commercial health clubs.
Macomb Family YMCA	10 North River Road, Mount Clemens
The independent Mount Clemens branch, having financial difficulties, merged with YMCA of Metropolitan Detroit in 1998. The Mount Clemens Lions Club donated land for this branch, which opened in 1969.
South Oakland Family YMCA	1016 West Eleven Mile Road, Royal Oak
The Royal Oak branch was established in 1947, and programs began in temporary spaces like public parks before a permanent location was established in an old house in 1949. The current building was dedicated on September 21, 1958, and was connected to the house, which became a dedicated youth building. The first section of a planned three-unit project, it contained meeting rooms, a games room, and a hobby room. The planned dormitory section did not materialize, but a swimming pool was added in 1966. The old house was condemned and demolished in 1974. Part of the lot was used for an addition that contained four courts for racquetball and a fitness center with exercise equipment, whirlpools and a sauna. The addition opened in 1975. South Oakland Family YMCA received coverage in the local newspaper during the 1980s for its fitness center having limited accessibility to women, an issue not necessarily unique to this location. As of 1989, men and women used the fitness center during exclusive times, with 17 hours per week for women and 85 for men, despite women being about half of the location's membership. The organization considered building a separate fitness center for women. Renovating the facility to reconfigure the locker rooms and expand the fitness center and make it co-ed was the ultimate solution. The renovated facility reopened on February 28, 1993. Renovations were completed in the lobby area in 2022.
Camp Nissokone	6836 F-41, Oscoda
A 180-acre summer camp on Van Etten Lake, it has been owned by the YMCA since around 1914, and was expanded in 1920.
Camp Ohiyesa	7300 Hickory Ridge, Holly
Established in 1918 on Fish Lake, Camp Ohiyesa has 300 acres. Its name means "winner" or "always wins" in the Dakota language and was chosen because, according to the Sioux, the three qualities of winners are endurance, bravery, and patience.

=== Former locations ===
These are the locations that have closed since 2008.

Auburn Hills	Opened in September 2003, closed in October 2020.
Birmingham	Established in the 1950s, the Birmingham YMCA had 1,599 members when it closed in April 2026. A pool and racquetball courts were added in 1974. Financially unable to invest in repairs and modernization, the organization sold the building to the city in 2023, which intended to develop it as a senior center, and YMCA leased the building until its closing.
Lakeshore Family YMCA	This location, in St. Clair Shores, closed in 2020.
Livonia Family YMCA	Closed in 2020.
Renaissance Center YMCA	In street-level suite A320 of tower 300 of the Renaissance Center, this small branch offered cardio and weight training equipment with views of the Detroit River.
Warren	Closed April 2008.
