= Buckley School =

Buckley School may refer to:

- Buckley School (California), a school in Los Angeles
- Buckley School (New York City)
- Buckley Country Day School, a Roslyn, New York N-8 school
