= Goodale Sisters =

American poets

- Born: 1863 (Elaine); 1866 (Dora); Mount Washington, Massachusetts, U.S.
- Died: 1953
- Education: Smith College
- Occupations: Poets, educators
- Years active: 1871–1941
- Known for: Early American poetry, inclusion in An American Anthology (1900)
- Relatives: Elaine Goodale Eastman; Dora Read Goodale

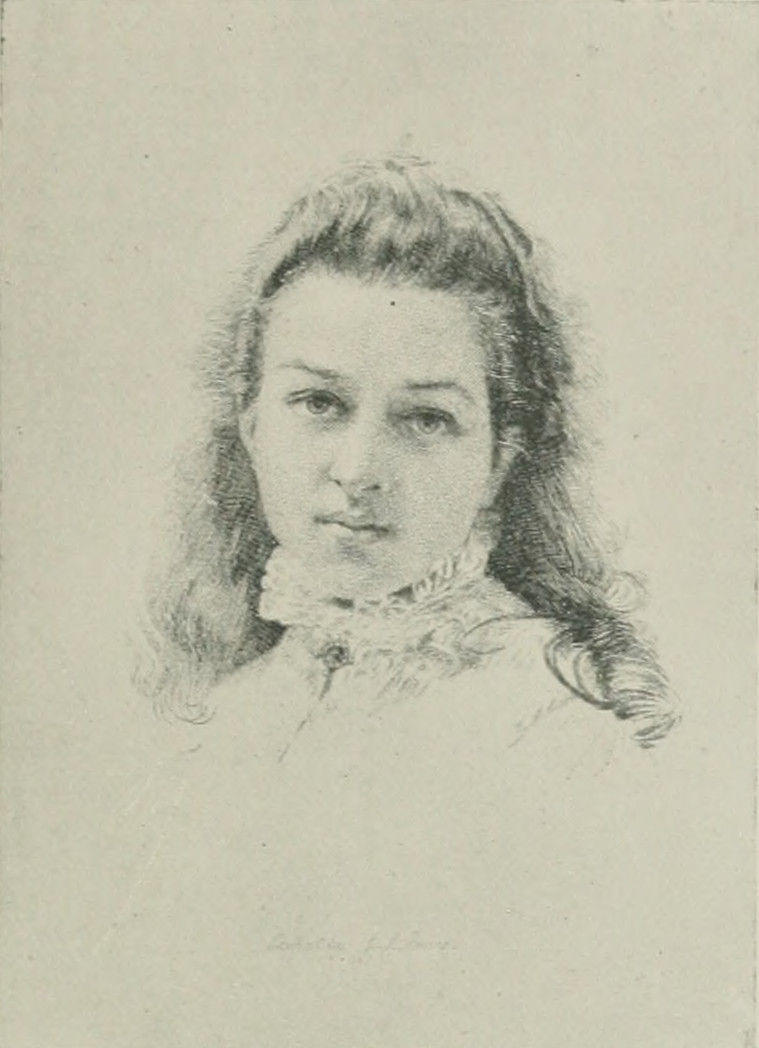
Elaine Goodale Eastman

Elaine Goodale Eastman (1863–1953) and Dora Read Goodale (1866–1953) were American poets and sisters from Massachusetts. They published their first poetry as children still living at home, and were included in Edmund Clarence Stedman's classic An American Anthology (1900).

Elaine Goodale taught at the Indian Department of Hampton Institute, started a day school on a Dakota reservation in 1886, and was appointed as Superintendent of Indian Education for the Two Dakotas by 1890. She married Dr. Charles Eastman (also known as Ohiye S'a), a Santee Sioux who was among the first Native Americans to graduate from medical school and become a physician educated in Western medicine. They lived with their growing family in the West for several years. Goodale collaborated with him in writing about his childhood and Sioux culture; his nine books were popular and made him a featured speaker on a public lecture circuit. She also continued her own writing, writing both as a journalist in many of the newspapers and magazines of the day, and books in genres including novels, biography and memoir. Her last book was published in 1930; a memoir edited by Kay Graber was published posthumously in 1978.

Dora Read Goodale published a book of poetry at age 21 and continued to write. She became a teacher of art and English in Connecticut. Later she was a teacher and director of the Uplands Sanatorium in Pleasant Hill, Tennessee. She attracted positive reviews when she published her last book of poetry at age 75 in 1941, in which she combined modernist free verse with the use of Appalachian dialect to express her neighbors' traditional lives.

== Early life and education ==
Elaine and Dora were born in the 1860s to Dora Hill Read and Henry Sterling Goodale, a farmer and writer in Mount Washington, Massachusetts. Dora Read Goodale was the daughter of a notable colonial family, and Henry Goodale could trace his family tree all the way back to 1632, to an ancestor who settled in Salem, Massachusetts. Elaine, born October 9, 1863, was the couple's first child. Elaine's sister Dora was born four years later.

From 1876 to 1879 Elaine and Dora's father served as a delegate to the Massachusetts State Board of Agriculture. His poem "Does Farming Pay?", in the October 1880 issue of Harper's Monthly, was reviewed in The New York Times as a "terrific" piece of dialect verse.

The Goodale sisters grew up on their parents' farm, known as Sky Farm. They had a brother Robert, and a sister, Rose Sterling Goodale, who married James A. Dayton and preserved much of the family's history and manuscripts. The entire family absorbed the New England Transcendental culture.

Elaine and Dora were precocious writers, starting poetry while young. Elaine self-published her poems at age eight in her Sky Farm Life, a monthly. Her first pastoral poem appeared in the Springfield Republican when she was twelve. Friends helped collect the two girls' early writings; Elaine was fifteen and Dora twelve when their first book was published:

- Apple Blossoms: Verses of Two Children (1878)
- In Berkshire with the Wildflowers (1879)
- All Round the Year: Verses from Sky Farm (1880)

Beginning in 1881, the Goodale sisters contributed to such periodicals as Scribner's Monthly, Harper's and Sunday Magazine. In 1887 both sisters had their poetry published in St. Nicholas Magazine, as well. As the biographer Theodore Sargent noted, both young poets were included in Edmund Clarence Stedman's classic An American Anthology, 1787-1900, published in 1900.

== Elaine Goodale Eastman ==
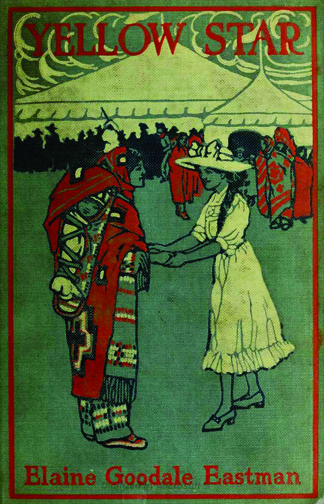
1911 novel by Elaine Goodale Eastman, illustrations by Angel De Cora and William Henry Dietz

In 1881 Elaine published The Journal of a Farmer's Daughter. Two years later she became a teacher at the Hampton Institute, in Virginia for the education of freedmen. She taught a new group of 100 Native American students from the West. In 1885 Goodale made a tour through the Sioux Reservation, as she wanted to learn more about her students' world.

Having become interested in the cause of Indian reform, in 1886 Elaine Goodale received a government appointment to teach Indians at the White River Camp, where she set up a day school. She strongly supported educating children at day schools on the reservations rather than sending them away to boarding schools. In 1890 Goodale was appointed Superintendent of Indian Education for the Two Dakotas for the Bureau of Indian Affairs.

In the aftermath of the Wounded Knee Massacre in December 1890, she cared for the wounded with Dr. Charles Eastman, a Santee Sioux doctor of part Anglo-American ancestry. They fell in love, and in 1891 she and Charles were married in New York.

The couple had six children:

- Dora Winona Eastman, d. August 22, 1964, Northampton, MA
- Irene Eastman, d. October 23, 1918, Keene, NH
- Virginia Eastman, d. April 2, 1991, Amherst, MA (married Mr. Sterling Whitbeck)
- Eleanor Eastman, d. May 2, 1999, Pittsford, NY (married Mr. Ernst Mensel)
- Florence Eastman, d. December 30, 1930, Holyoke, MA (married Mr. Robert Prentiss)
- Charles Eastman Jr. (Ohiyesa), d. January 15, 1940, Detroit, MI (married Miss Marion Nutting)

The couple remained together for three decades, returning to Massachusetts in 1903. They had struggled financially after Eastman was forced out of two physician positions with the Indian Health Service. For a time they both worked at the Carlisle Indian School in Pennsylvania. There Goodale Eastman edited the school newspaper, the Red Man.

After Goodale Eastman started helping Eastman write his stories of childhood and Indian culture, he became well known and sought after for lectures. The family was based in Amherst, near Goodale's family, as Eastman increasingly traveled for public lectures and other activities. Goodale managed his lecture tours and associated publicity, as he had about 25 lectures annually. They also collaborated on writing, and he published eight books while they lived in Amherst; Goodale Eastman published three during the time they were married; after they separated she published four additional books. The extent to which Goodale Eastman edited or influenced Charles Eastman’s writing is a source of much debate.

In 1915 the family founded their own summer camp, Camp Oáhe, at Granite Lake, New Hampshire, where the adults and three oldest children all worked for several years. Their daughter Irene, a promising opera singer and Charles' favorite, died in the influenza epidemic of 1918, leaving both parents devastated and further straining their relationship. In 1921, after allegations that Charles had an affair and an illegitimate child, the couple separated. They never divorced or publicly acknowledged the separation. Charles Eastman did not publish any books after their separation.

Goodale Eastman continued to write, publishing four books after her separation from Charles: The Luck of Old Acres (1928), a novel about a summer camp; and her last book of poems, The Voice at Eve (1930), which included a biographical essay entitled "All the Days of My Life". In 1935, when she was more than 70 years old, she published both her best novel, One Hundred Maples, and a biography of Richard Henry Pratt, founder of the Carlisle Indian School. She also published numerous articles, letters and book reviews in a variety of journals. Her 1935 biography of Pratt and a 1945 article on the Ghost Dance and Wounded Knee Massacre are recognized as "important historical documents on the transition period in Plains Indian history."

After her death of natural causes on December 22, 1953, her ashes were scattered in the Spring Grove Cemetery in Florence, Massachusetts, near where her daughter Dora and her family lived. Goodale Eastman had written a memoir about her experiences as a school teacher of the Sioux called Sister to the Sioux. The manuscript was published posthumously in 1978 by the University of Nebraska Press.

== Dora Read Goodale ==
After graduating from Smith College in 1890, Dora published her first independent book of poetry in 1887, Heralds of Easter. She became a teacher of art and English in Reading, Connecticut, which her mother's family had settled. She never married, but she and her sister Elaine exchanged numerous letters over the decades in which they examined the various alternatives for women.

Later in life Dora worked as a teacher and director of Uplands Sanatorium in Pleasant Hill, Tennessee. In 1941 she published Mountain Dooryards, her last book of poetry, a work that was written in modernist free verse and used the dialect of the people of the Appalachians and expressed their traditional but changing world.

== Legacy ==
- In 1950 Goodale Eastman donated her papers to Smith College, where she had earned her undergraduate degree. (She had removed most of the references to Charles Eastman.) Her sister, Rose Sterling Goodale Dayton, subsequently donated many papers to the collection.

=== Film portrayal ===
In the HBO film Bury My Heart at Wounded Knee (2007), Elaine Goodale was portrayed by the actress Anna Paquin.

== Works ==
Poetry:

- Elaine Goodale and Dora Read Goodale. Apple-blossoms: verses of two children, G.P. Putnam's Sons, 1878.
- ______________________. (and illustrated by William Hamilton Gibson). In Berkshire with the wild flowers, G.P. Putnam's Sons, 1879.
- _____________________. All Round the Year: Verses from Sky Farm, G.P. Putnam's Sons, (1880).
- Goodale, Dora Read. Heralds of Easter (1887).
- Goodale, Dora Read.Test of the Sky, 1926
- Goodale, Dora Read.Mountain Dooryards, 1941; 1945, revised and enlarged
- Eastman, Elaine Goodale. The Voice at Eve, collected poems (Unknown Binding - 1930).

Non-fiction:

- Eastman, Elaine Goodale. Journal of a Farmer's Daughter, (Unknown Binding - 1881).
- ________________. The Senator and the School-house ([Indian Rights Association. Publications. 1st ser.]), (Unknown Binding - 1886).
- ________________. Indian Wars and Warriors, (Unknown Binding - 1894)
- ________________ & Charles A. Eastman. Smoky Day's Wigwam Evenings: Indian Stories Retold, Little, Brown and Company, 1910.
- _________________. Pratt The Red Man's Moses, 1935. (biography of Richard Pratt, founder of the Carlisle Indian School
- ________________. Western Sentiment on the Indian Question, (Unknown Binding - 1946)
- ________________. Sister to the Sioux: The Memoirs of Elaine Goodale Eastman: 1885-1891, Kay Graber, editor, University of Nebraska Press, 1978.

Fiction:

- Eastman, Elaine Goodale. Little Brother O' Dreams, Houghton Mifflin Company, February 1910.
- ______________. Yellow Star: A Story of East and West, Little, Brown and Company, 1911. (Goodale Eastman described these first two novels as "potboilers".)
- ______________. The Eagle and the Star,: American Indian Pageant Play in Three Acts, (Unknown Binding - 1916)
- ______________. The Luck of Oldacres (1928), New York: Century Company
- ______________. Hundred Maples, Stephen Daye Press, 1935.
