= Camp Dudley =

Boys camp in Westport, New York, US

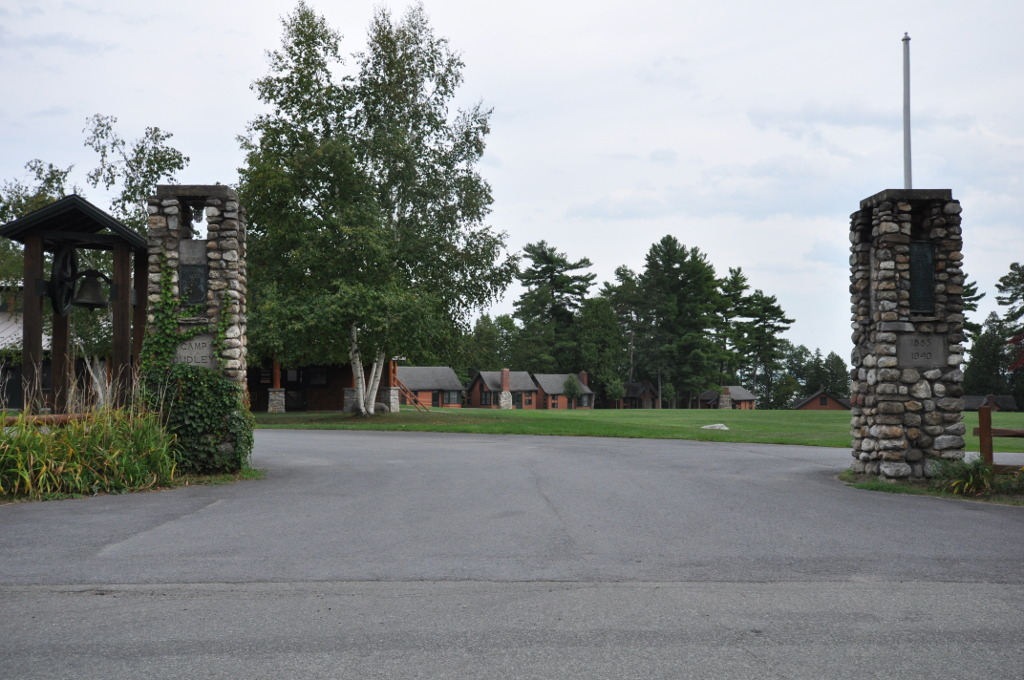
- Entrance to Camp Dudley
- Interactive map of Camp Dudley
- Location: Westport, New York, U.S.
- Coordinates: 44°08′41″N 073°25′13″W
- Previous names: Camp Baldhead; Boys' Camping Society
- Established: 1885; 141 years ago
- Slogan: "The Other Fellow First"
- Website: campdudley.org

Founded in 1885 by Sumner F. Dudley, Camp Dudley is the oldest continually running boys camp in the United States. It is located in Westport, New York, on the shores of Lake Champlain. In 1993, it was included within the Camp Dudley Road Historic District when listed on the National Register of Historic Places.

== History and traditions ==
=== Early history ===
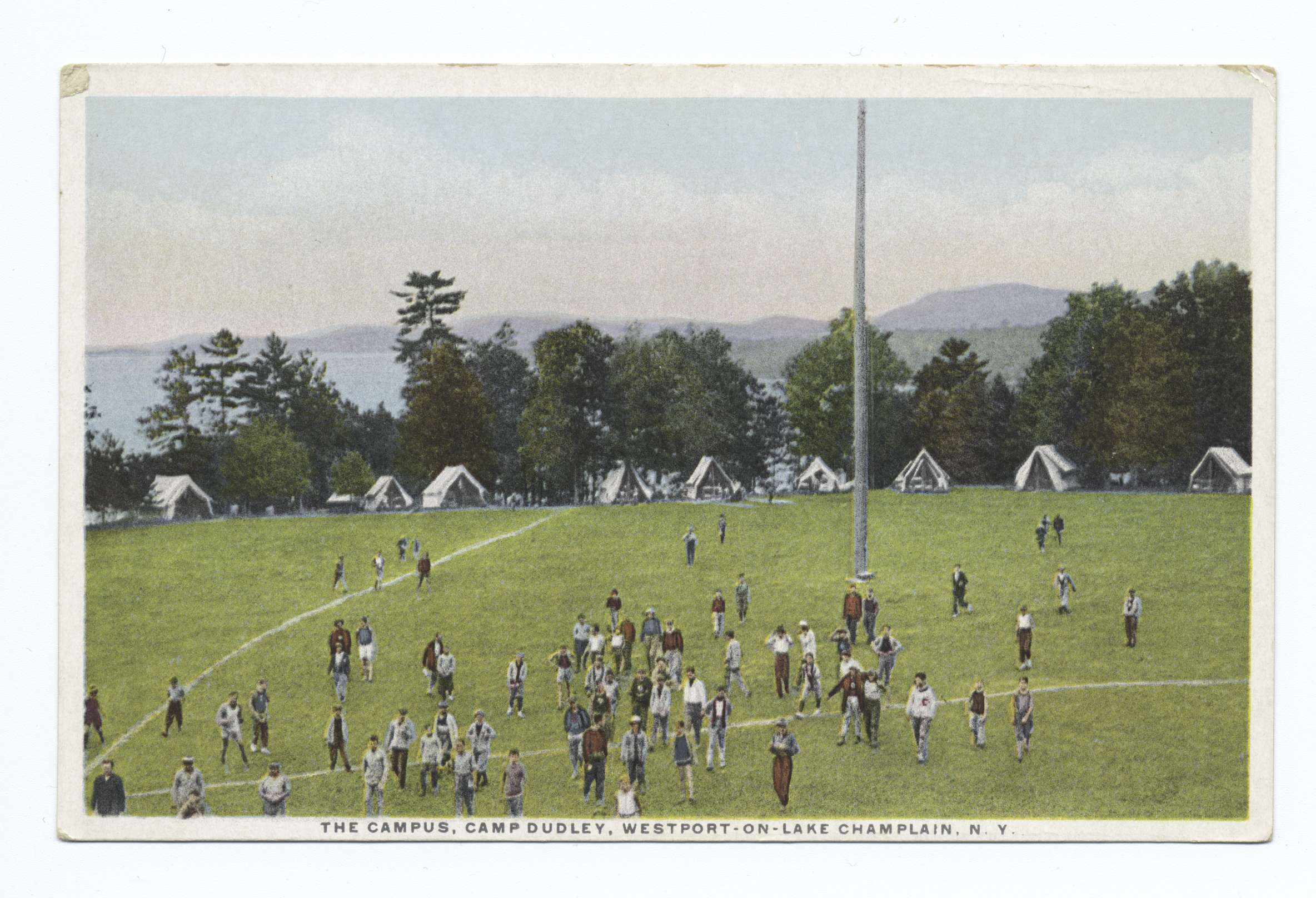
Early 20th century

Sumner F. Dudley, long active in both the New York and New Jersey YMCA movements, was asked in 1884 to take "young honor YMCA members" camping. In 1885, he took seven boys for a week's encampment at Orange Lake, N. J. The next year Dudley moved the site to Twin Islands, Lake Wawayanda, New Jersey. Ultimately, the camp settled on Lake Champlain, N.Y., in 1891 . Dudley referred to the first camp as Camp Baldhead , and later the Boys' Camping Society (B.C.S.). After Dudley's death in 1897, the camp was renamed Camp Dudley.

In 2015, Camp Dudley officially parted ways with the YMCA after respectful discussions concerning Camp Dudley's desire to become independent.

Camp Dudley produced several leaders of the early organized camping movement, including two presidents of the Camp Directors Association of America: Herman C. Beckman, who served as Camp Dudley's director from 1908 to 1947 and as president of the association in 1918–1919, and Dr. Elias G. Brown, who served as camp physician at Dudley for six years, founded Adirondack Camp for Boys on Lake George in 1904, and later served as president of the association in 1911–1912.

=== Camp numbers ===
Campers are assigned camp numbers in ascending order based on when they first attended Camp. The first camp number (No. 1) was assigned George Peck in 1903. Since then, over 27,000 campers, leaders, and staff have each been given a unique, identifying number. At alumni gatherings, there is often a competition to see who in attendance has the lowest and therefore oldest camp number.

== Mission and values ==
No longer officially operated by the YMCA, Camp Dudley is an independent camp managed by the Board of Managers. It draws from the YMCA's own tenets of mind, body, and spirit. Though non-denominational, the camp espouses "Christian values" in its teachings and programs, not least of which is its motto, "The Other Fellow First". The mission is to develop moral, personal, physical and leadership skills in the spirit of fellowship and fun, enabling boys and girls to lead lives characterized by devotion to others.

Thanks to a strong and financially supportive alumni base, the camp offers scholarships to those in financial need.

In the summer of 2006, Camp Dudley acquired a sister camp in Colchester, Vermont called Camp Kiniya after purchasing it from the Williams family. A driving force in this expansion was for the daughters of Camp Dudley alumni to have a place to learn the same ethics and values that their sons could learn at Camp Dudley.

== Alumni ==
One of the unique characteristics of Dudley is the loyalty and support of its alumni. For most campers, their relationship with Dudley does not end with the close of the camping season but continues throughout their lives. Many former campers return as Leaders, and alumni and parents contribute to Dudley through their financial support. All friends of Dudley are invited to attend the alumni gatherings, as well as the August CDA Reunion at Camp. Between 35 and 40 alumni gatherings are held during the year throughout the country and around the world on the Dudley "Reunion Trail". 2009 was Camp Dudley's 125th summer.

=== Notable alumni ===
- #10057 Erasmus "Sam" Amukun – Olympic sprinter
- #12228 Rob Campbell – Actor
- #7926 R. Inslee Clark, Jr. (1935–1999) – First Dean of Admissions at Yale University to admit women
- #13373 Jonathan Edwards – Olympic triple jumper, sports broadcaster
- #16319 Chris Feifs – Head coach, University of Vermont men's lacrosse team
- Tate Forcier – Former University of Michigan quarterback and Canadian Football League player
- Bruce Gehrke (1924–1976) – Columbia University Athletics Hall of Fame inductee, NFL player
- Philip J. Hanlon – 18th President of Dartmouth College, 2013–2023
- #15191 Oliver Jeffers – Artist
- #8252 Charles W. Johnson III – Parliamentarian of the United States House of Representatives, 1994–2004
- #12163 Bob Kindred – Jazz tenor saxophone player, composer
- #3567 Burgess Meredith (1907–1997) – Actor
- Quenton Nelson – All-Pro NFL offensive lineman, Seattle Seahawks
- Shaun O'Hara – Former NFL center
- #13162 Clark Peterson – Film producer
- Bob Pettit – NBA player, 1970 Basketball Hall of Fame inductee
- #13556 Mac Premo – Artist, filmmaker
- #16694 Ron Sanchez – Associate head coach for the Baylor University men's basketball team
- #17421 Mihali Savoulidis – Guitarist and lead vocalist of Twiddle
- #16841 Andrew Weibrecht – World Cup alpine ski racer and two-time Olympic medalist
- #10420 James Widdoes – Actor, director, and producer
- Cameron Winklevoss – Investor, former Olympic rower
- Tyler Winklevoss – Investor, former Olympic rower
- Samuel Adams Wisner – Rapper

== Camp Dudley at Kiniya ==
In 2006, Camp Dudley officially acquired Camp Kiniya to expand its rich camping tradition to girls. Camp Kiniya was founded in 1919 by Helen Van Buren and lies on the Vermont shores of Lake Champlain, in Colchester. Traditions at Camp Kiniya include the Kiwi Day, where the entire camp celebrates campers and staffers who have attended for four years or more. Camp Dudley at Kiniya has grown into a balanced blend of both camps, including traditions from each original camp. There are 16 camper cabins, with additional staff cabins. The camp is divided into two divisions, Junior Division and Senior Division. Summer 2018 was the camp's 100th summer.

== Campers, Leadership, Leaders, and Staff ==
At both Dudley and Kiniya, there are cabins that support a variety of ages. At Dudley, campers are typically 10-14, and at Kiniya campers are 10-14. Girls and boys are placed in cabins based on their ages. The cabins are divided into divisions: Cubs, Plebes, Juniors, and Seniors for Dudley and Cubs, Cats, Juniors and Seniors for Kiniya. Kiniya is, in general, a smaller camp, with fewer campers and less acreage. When you finish your last camper year, you may apply to become an Aide, the first step on the road in being a leader. An Aide lives in cabins with young campers but still has the opportunity to play on sports teams with the oldest campers. At 16 and 17, you can become a Junior Leader or Assistant Leader, paid positions in cabins that are designed to support the leader. At 18, one may become a leader, the main counselor in the cabin. One can also be a program staff member at 18 and beyond, working in the Athletics, Arts, Outdoors, or Waterfront departments.

== Daily Activities/Program Areas ==
=== Athletics ===
There are many athletic opportunities for boys and girls to participate in. There is:

- Basketball
- Soccer
- Softball/Baseball
- Tennis
- Golf
- Ultimate Frisbee
- Dudley Handball
- Lacrosse
- Archery
- Dud-Ball

These are played in a major, a specialized activity block for each child, or team competition, a time of the day where teams play sports against each other to learn the value of respect and good sportsmanship.

=== Arts ===
- Theatre
- Arts and Crafts
- Theatre Tech
- Music
- Ceramics

=== Outdoors ===
- Hiking and Overnight Camping
- Challenge Course Elements (low and high)
- Rock Climbing
- Camp craft

=== Waterfront ===
- Kayaking
- Canoeing
- Sailing
- Paddle boarding
- Swimming
- Boating
- Diving

=== Spiritual ===
There is a focus on spiritual life at Kiniya and Dudley, especially on Sundays. While not endorsing any single denomination, the experience is distinctly Christian: crosses adorn the chapel space, hymns with Christian lyrics are sung, and a camper or staff member says grace before every meal. However, the camp provides bus service to a Catholic Sunday mass for any interested campers and those in the camp Gospel Choir.

There is a chapel service on Sunday mornings with a guest speaker to help campers more fully understand "The Other Fellow First", which provides many life lessons in their speeches. All campers and staff members wear the camps' traditional blue and white colors to this service. On Sunday nights, the camps gather by cabin to sing hymns in the grand old Witherbee hall, known as Hymn Sing.

=== Other Activities ===
Every Wednesday and Saturday shows are performed by the campers and staff. Wednesday nights are talent shows, and Saturday nights are scripted plays. Each division has its own extravaganza once a session, which is a themed day planned by the division's leaders.

== Dudley Cheers ==
"D-U-D-L-E-Y / Whitewashed cookies, chicken pie / Pink music, pickeral fry / Westport, Westport my oh my / All ye campers stand in line (line) / Take your hats off just like mine (mine) / Bevo, bivo, boom get a rat trap bigger than a cat trap, (slowly) bevo, bivo, BOOM!"

== See also ==
- Summer camp
- YMCA
- Lake Champlain
