= Chocorua Island Chapel =

Historic church in New Hampshire, United States

- U.S. National Register of Historic Places
- Location within New Hampshire Location within the United States
- Nearest city: Holderness, New Hampshire
- Coordinates: 43.75555°N 71.542681°W
- Built: 1881
- Website: Chocorua Island Chapel Association
- NRHP reference No.: 16000644
- Added to NRHP: September 20, 2016

The Chocorua Island Chapel is a non-denominational chapel located on the island of the same name on Squam Lake in Grafton County, New Hampshire, in the town of Holderness. It is an open-air place of worship, created as an extension of Camp Chocorua, the first summer youth camp in the United States. The open-air chapel was created by the camp's first season of young boys, made entirely of boulders, trees, various island vegetation, and beach sand.

== The camp ==
Ernest Berkeley Balch was born in 1860, one of fourteen children of Episcopal minister Lewis Penn Witherspoon Balch and his wife. The family lived on an estate in New Hampshire. Rev. Balch had aspirations of establishing a private Episcopal school, and after his 1875 death his widow donated much of the estate to establish the Holderness School.

Sources differ on the exact timeline, but either before or after his 1879 enrollment at Dartmouth College, Ernest joined his friends Henry Burke Closson and Charles Merrill Hough on their summer camp-out on Squam Lake. The experience inspired Ernest to start a wilderness camp for young boys, one which would contribute to their spiritual development as well as physical stamina. With help from Hough and other college friends, the camp was constructed on the privately owned Chocorua Island, and began operations the summer of 1881. Apparently, they discovered after the fact that it was not public land. An arrangement was later worked out with the owner for operations to continue. Although it ultimately lost money for its investors, the venture is recognized as the first summer youth camp in America, and considered to be the vanguard for the proliferation of the youth camp culture.

== The chapel ==
The open-air chapel was built by the boys during the camp's first summer season, clearing the land and using natural elements. From Squam Lake, they retrieved a hunk of granite with the correct shape for a lectern, and placed it beside the "erratic granite boulder" they had re-purposed for an altar. Both altar and lectern were adorned with ferns and wildflowers on Sunday. The benches and the cross were fashioned from native trees on the island; beach sand was used as flooring. Two services were held each Sunday, providing an afternoon one for visitors and an evening service prior to bedtime for the boys.

The camp itself ceased operations after the 1889 season, but the chapel continued to serve visitors to the island. The Chocorua Chapel Association was formed by eight individuals in 1903: Ellen Balch and her husband Oliver Whipple Huntington; Edith Balch and her husband Clifford Gray Twombley, an Episcopal minister; Lena Balch and her husband Joseph Howland Coit; Harold Jefferson Coolidge; and W. Percy Van Ness, who became the chapel organist. The association assumed responsibility for the chapel's operation and continued maintenance, and donations to the chapel are redistributed to non-profit community organizations.

Grover Cleveland, whose second term as President of the United States ended in 1897, attended worship services at the chapel during the summer of 1904. Although the camp had fallen into disrepair by that date, the chapel continued to provide worship services for visitors and area residents. Eventually, the Association branched out and ran the chapel as non-denominational. In 1928, the owner of the island donated it to the Association.

== NRHP certification ==
The chapel was added to the National Register of Historic Places in Grafton County, New Hampshire on September 20, 2016.

Five of the fifteen contributing properties to qualify for the NRHP are on the south end arrival area of the island: the wharf, the sea wall and docks, two crosses, and a shelter for the memory book. Three of the four non-contributing properties are also at the south end: two sheds and a boulder. At the north end where the chapel is located, the only non-contributing property is the organ shed. Ten of the fifteen contributing properties are at the north end: cross and altar, lectern, baptismal font, benches, bell and tower, the organ, a robing hut and a stone wall.
