= Knickerbocker Greys =

Youth cadet corps

The Knickerbocker Greys is a youth cadet corps located in Manhattan. Founded in 1881, it is the oldest after school activity in the United States.

== History ==
The Knickerbocker Greys was founded by Augusta Lawler Stacey Curtis, the wife of Dr. Edward Curtis, a noted New York City physician who served on the staff of the Surgeon General of the Union Army, and assisted in the autopsy on the body of President Abraham Lincoln. She started the corps as a way to keep her boys busy after school. At the time, there were no after-school activities or organized sports.

With a group of mothers, Mrs. Curtis asked Lieutenant Adolph W. Callison of the 22nd Regiment to be a Drill Master, and found a location at the 12th Regiment New York National Guard Armory. They chose a uniform similar to that of an English organization, consisting of a gray jacket, knickerbockers, and round cap, which were all trimmed with black braid. The group's name was derived from the common nickname for early Dutch settlers of New York who wore knee-length pants known as knickerbockers. This style was adopted as the original uniform. See "knickerbockers”, and the color of the dress uniform, “Cadet Grey”.

In the winter 1886-1887 the 12th Regiment moved into their new armory, so the Greys obtained permission to drill in the armory of the 71st Regiment then at Broadway and 35th Street. They followed the Regiment first to Broadway and 45th Street and later to their armory at Park Avenue and 34th Street. During the construction of this armory on Park Avenue, the Greys used various halls about the city for one season. In 1902 the 71st Regiment Armory burned down and the Knickerbocker Greys were invited to drill in the 7th Regiment Armory (now known as the Park Avenue Armory) at Park Avenue and East 67th Street through the courtesy of Colonel Daniel Appleton.

Over the years, many of New York's prominent families enrolled their sons in the Greys. Originally for boys ages 8-16, the Greys first accepted girls in 1986.

== The Knickerbocker Greys today ==
The program is open to boys and girls ages 7 to 16, and meet on Tuesday afternoons from 4:45 - 6pm during the school year. The Greys meet at the Park Avenue Armory at East 67th Street, where they learn traditional marching, practice color guards, practice public speaking and learn about history.

As cadets master new skills, they pass on their knowledge to the younger cadets. The Greys appear in public events in New York, performing color guards for historical and civic events, marching in the Veteran's Day and Flag Day Parades, taking part in George Washington's Inauguration reenactment, and wreath laying at The Soldier's and Sailor's Monument on Memorial Day.

In March 2022, the Park Avenue Armory Conservancy, a tenant in the Armory, moved to evict the Greys from their basement headquarters of over 120 years (800 square foot space).

== Notable former cadets ==
- Hugh D. Auchincloss, stockbroker and lawyer
- Cortlandt F. Bishop, aviator, balloonist, autoist, book collector, and traveler
- Robert Chambers, murderer
- Henry Sloane Coffin president of the Union Theological Seminary, Moderator of the Presbyterian Church in the United States of America
- William Sloane Coffin, businessman
- William Bayard Cutting Jr., diplomat.
- Douglas Fairbanks Jr., actor
- Robert W. Goelet, financier and real estate developer in New York City
- Hallett Johnson, diplomat and ambassador to Costa Rica
- John Lindsay, Congressman and Mayor of New York City
- Austen Fox Riggs, psychiatrist and pioneering researcher in stress response
- Edmund Maurice Burke Roche, British Conservative Party politician
- John D Rockefeller III, philanthropist
- Nelson Rockefeller, Vice President of the United States, Governor of New York
- Cornelius Vanderbilt III, inventor and engineer
