= 29th Young Artist Awards =

2008 US media awards ceremony

- Official program
- Awarded for: Achievement in 2007 in film and television
- Date: March 30, 2008
- Site: Sportsmen's Lodge; Studio City, Los Angeles, California
- Hosted by: Zachary Gordon and AnnaSophia Robb

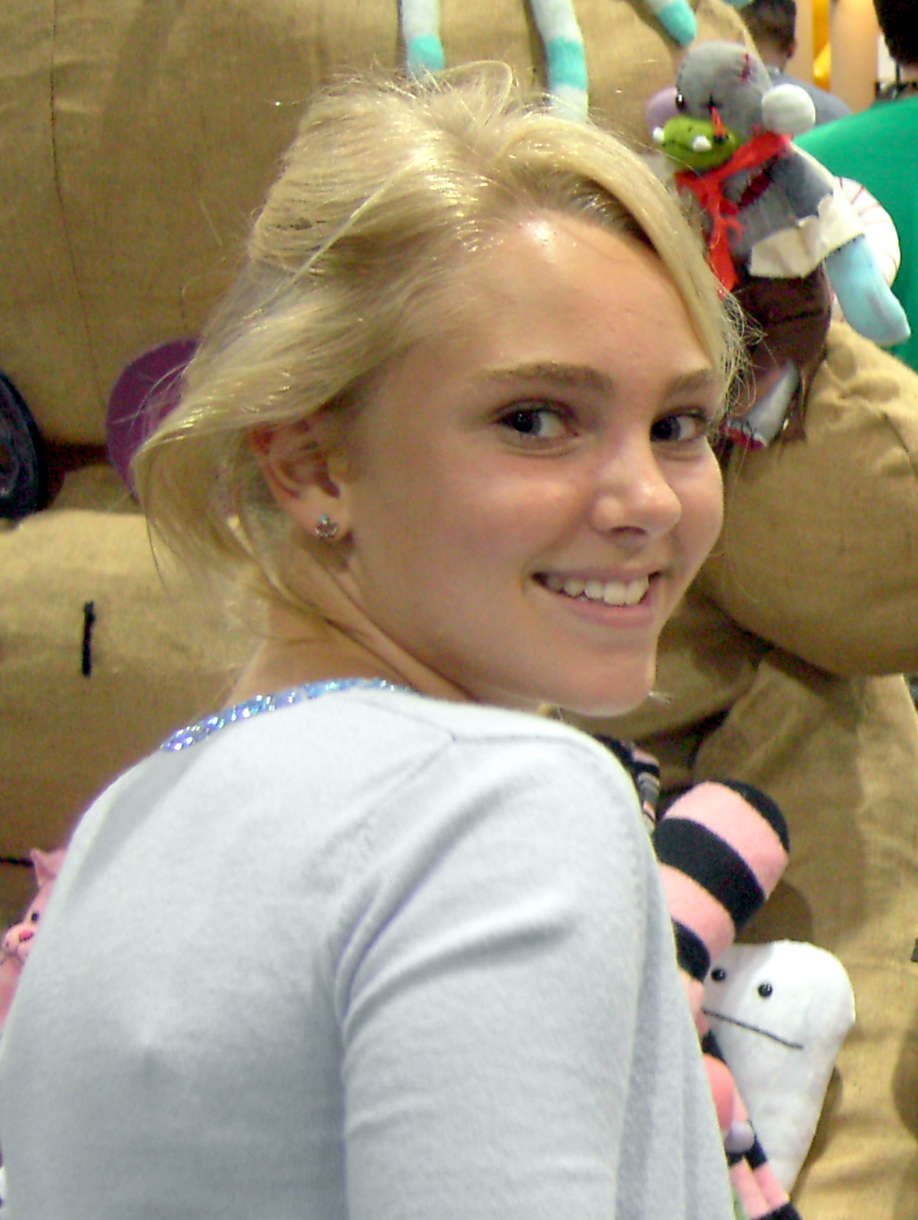
AnnaSophia Robb, winner of Best Performance in a Feature Film – Leading Young Actress

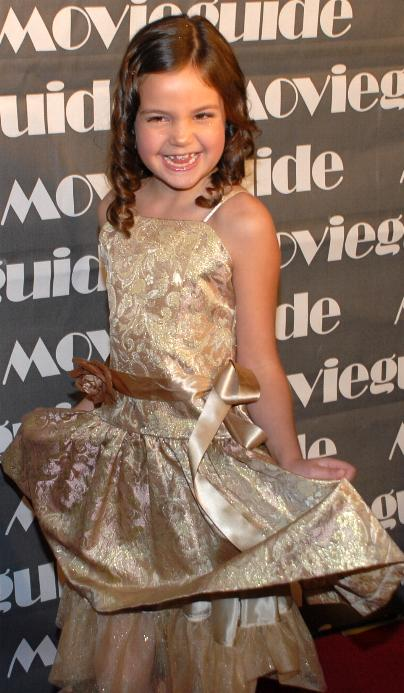
Bailee Madison, winner of Best Performance in a Feature Film – Young Actress Ten and Under

The 29th Young Artist Awards ceremony, presented by the Young Artist Association, honored excellence of young performers under the age of 21 in the fields of film, television and theatre for the year 2007, and took place on March 30, 2008 at the Sportsmen's Lodge in Studio City, Los Angeles, California.

The big winner that year was Bridge to Terabithia, with one of the rare "sweeps" in the history of the Young Artist Awards. The film won all categories for which it was nominated, taking a total of five awards – "Best 'Fantasy' Family Feature Film", "Best Leading Young Actor in a Feature Film" for Josh Hutcherson, "Best Leading Young Actress in a Feature Film" for AnnaSophia Robb, "Best Young Actress Age 10 and Under in a Feature Film" for Bailee Madison, and "Best Young Ensemble in a Feature Film" for the entire young cast.

Established in 1978 by long-standing Hollywood Foreign Press Association member, Maureen Dragone, the Young Artist Association was the first organization to establish an awards ceremony specifically set to recognize and award the contributions of performers under the age of 21 in the fields of film, television, theater and music.

== Categories ==
★ Bold indicates the winner in each category.

== Best Performance in a Feature Film ==
=== Best Performance in a Feature Film – Leading Young Actor ===
★ Josh Hutcherson – Bridge to Terabithia – Buena Vista Pictures

- Alex Etel – The Water Horse: Legend of the Deep – Columbia Pictures
- Miles Heizer – Rails & Ties – Warner Brothers
- Freddie Highmore – August Rush – Warner Brothers
- Jacob Kogan – Joshua – Fox Searchlight Pictures
- Logan Lerman – 3:10 to Yuma – Lionsgate
- Zach Mills – Mr. Magorium's Wonder Emporium – 20th Century Fox
- Alex Neuberger – Underdog – Buena Vista Pictures
- Chris O'Neil – The Last Mimzy – New Line Cinema
- Alejandro Polanco – Chop Shop – Koch Lober Films

=== Best Performance in a Feature Film – Leading Young Actress ===
★ AnnaSophia Robb – Bridge to Terabithia – Buena Vista Pictures

- Gracie Bednarczyk – Grace Is Gone – The Weinstein Company
- Abigail Breslin – No Reservations – Warner Brothers
- Isamar Gonzales – Chop Shop – Koch Lober Films
- Kay Panabaker – Moondance Alexander – 20th Century Fox
- Dakota Blue Richards – The Golden Compass – New Line Cinema
- Emma Roberts – Nancy Drew – Warner Brothers
- Saoirse Ronan – Atonement – Focus Features

=== Best Performance in a Feature Film – Supporting Young Actor (Fantasy or Drama) ===
★ Leon G. Thomas III – August Rush – Warner Brothers

- Alex Ferris – The Invisible – Buena Vista Pictures
- Dillon Freasier – There Will Be Blood – Paramount Pictures
- Soren Fulton – South of Pico – Snails Pace Productions
- Jordan Garrett – Death Sentence – 20th Century Fox
- Devon Gearhart – Canvas – Screen Media Films
- Bailey Hughes – Good Time Max – Rabbit Bandini Productions
- Denzel Whitaker – The Great Debaters – MGM

=== Best Performance in a Feature Film – Supporting Young Actor (Comedy or Musical) ===
★ Zachary Gordon – Georgia Rule – Universal Pictures

- Max Baldry – Mr. Bean's Holiday – Universal Pictures
- Jimmy Bennett – Evan Almighty – Universal Pictures
- Dylan McLaughlin – Georgia Rule – Universal Pictures
- Graham Phillips – Evan Almighty – Universal Pictures
- Ed Sanders – Sweeney Todd: The Demon Barber of Fleet Street – Paramount Pictures

=== Best Performance in a Feature Film – Supporting Young Actress ===
★ Jasmine Jessica Anthony – 1408 – MGM

- Courtney Taylor Burness – Premonition – MGM
- Hannah Lochner – Firehouse Dog – 20th Century Fox
- Taylor Momsen – Underdog – Buena Vista Pictures
- Jamia Simone Nash – August Rush – Warner Brothers
- Keke Palmer – Cleaner – Screen Gems
- Kristen Stewart – Into the Wild – Paramount Vantage

=== Best Performance in a Feature Film – Young Actor Ten and Under ===
★ Micah Berry – Things We Lost in the Fire – Paramount Pictures

- Nicholas Art – The Nanny Diaries – MGM
- Jackson Bond – The Invasion – Warner Brothers
- Bobby Coleman – Martian Child – New Line Cinema
- Nathan Gamble – The Mist – MGM
- Samuel Garland – The Reaping – Warner Brothers
- Dakota Goyo – Resurrecting the Champ – Yari Film Group
- Jeremy Karson – Music & Lyrics – Warner Brothers
- Austin Williams – Michael Clayton – Warner Brothers

=== Best Performance in a Feature Film – Young Actress Ten and Under ===
★ Bailee Madison – Bridge to Terabithia – Buena Vista Pictures

- Rachel Covey – Enchanted – Walt Disney Pictures
- Megan McKinnon – Project Grey – IndustryWorks
- Madison Pettis – The Game Plan – Buena Vista Pictures
- Willow Smith – I Am Legend – Warner Brothers
- Rhiannon Leigh Wryn – The Last Mimzy – New Line Cinema

=== Best Performance in a Feature Film – Young Ensemble Cast ===
★ Bridge to Terabithia – Buena Vista Pictures

Josh Hutcherson, AnnaSophia Robb, Bailee Madison, Cameron Wakefield, Isabelle Rose Kircher, Lauren Clinton, Elliot Lawless, Carly Owen, Devon Wood, Emma Fenton and Grace Brannigan

- Daddy Day Camp – TriStar Pictures

Spencir Bridges, Dallin Boyce, Telise Galanis, Tad D'Agostino, Talon G. Ackerman, Taggart Hurtubise, Molly Jepson, Tyger Rawlings, Zachary Allen and Sean Patrick Flaherty

- The Last Mimzy – New Line Cinema

Chris O'Neil, Rhiannon Leigh Wryn, Marc Musso, Megan McKinnon and Nicole Munoz

- Nancy Drew – Warner Brothers

Emma Roberts, Josh Flitter, Amy Bruckner and Kay Panabaker

== Best Performance in an International Feature Film ==
=== Best Performance in an International Feature Film – Leading Young Performer ===
★ Adrian Alonso (Mexico) – La Misma Luna (Under the Same Moon) – Fox Searchlight

- Noah Burnett (Canada) – Breakfast with Scot – Capri Films
- Louis Dussol (Switzerland) – 1 Journée (That Day) – Vega Film
- Zekeria Ebrahimi (Afghanistan) – The Kite Runner – Paramount Vantage
- Michel Joelsas (Brazil) – O Ano em que Meus Pais Saíram de Férias (The Year My Parents Went on Vacation) – City Lights Pictures
- Joel Lok (Australia) – The Home Song Stories – Dendy Films
- Ahmad Khan Mahmidzada (Afghanistan) – The Kite Runner – Paramount Vantage
- Bertille Noël-Bruneau (France) – Le Renard et l'Enfant (The Fox and the Child) – Picturehouse Entertainment
- Jimi Blue Ochsenknecht (Germany) – Die Wilden Kerle 4 (The Wild Soccer Bunch 4) – Buena Vista International
- Armin Omerovic (Croatia) – Armin – Maxima Film
- Roger Príncep (Spain) – The Orphanage – Picturehouse Entertainment
- Thomas Sangster (England) – The Last Legion – The Weinstein Company
- Michelle von Treuberg (Germany) – Die Wilden Hühner und das Leben (Wild Chicks in Love) – Constantin Film

== Best Performance in a Short Film ==
=== Best Performance in a Short Film – Young Actor ===
★ Remy Thorne – Bad – Vincenzo Giammanco (Director)

- Joseph Castanon – Little Wings – Journey Blue Films
- Hunter Gomez – The Blacksmith and the Carpenter – Scottsdale Community College
- Dominic Scott Kay – Grampa's Cabin – Red Balloon Entertainment
- Kendall McCulty – Conflation – Stéphanie Joalland (Director)
- Benjamin B. Smith – Heart Attack – Christi Olson (Director)
- Connor Stanhope – The Velveteen Rabbit – Denise Quesnel (Director)

=== Best Performance in a Short Film – Young Actress ===
★ Mia Ford – Far Sighted – Filmmakers Alliance

- Taylor Lipman – The Infamous Buddy Blade – Delaware Coalition Films
- Kendra McCulty – Conflation – Stéphanie Joalland (Director)
- Diandra Newlin – The Bench – Revolocity
- Car’ynn Sims – The Infamous Buddy Blade – Delaware Coalition Films

== Best Performance in a TV Movie, Miniseries or Special ==
=== Best Performance in a TV Movie, Miniseries or Special – Leading Young Actor ===
★ Chevez Ezaneh – Bury My Heart at Wounded Knee – HBO

- Devon Bostick – The Altar Boy Gang – CBC
- Cody Linley – The Haunting Hour: Don't Think About It – Universal
- Dylan McLaughlin – You've Got a Friend – Hallmark Channel
- Jansen Panettiere – The Last Day of Summer – Nickelodeon
- Graham Phillips – Ben 10: Race Against Time – Cartoon Network
- Jimmy "Jax" Pinchak – All I Want for Christmas – Hallmark Channel
- Devon Werkheiser – Shredderman Rules – Nickelodeon

=== Best Performance in a TV Movie, Miniseries or Special – Leading Young Actress ===
★ Danielle Chuchran – Saving Sarah Cain – Lifetime

- Holliston Coleman – Love's Unending Legacy – Hallmark Channel
- Jodelle Ferland – Pictures of Hollis Woods – Hallmark Hall of Fame
- Marisa Guterman – Shredderman Rules – Nickelodeon
- Regan Jewitt – Emotional Arithmetic – CBS
- Abigail Mason – Saving Sarah Cain – Lifetime
- Emily Osment – The Haunting Hour: Don't Think About It – Universal
- Emanuela Szumilas – Greatest Show Ever – Popoosa Productions
- Niamh Wilson – They Come Back – Lifetime

=== Best Performance in a TV Movie, Miniseries or Special – Supporting Young Actor ===
★ Zack Shada – Jane Doe: Ties That Bind – Hallmark Channel

- Ridge Canipe – Pictures of Hollis Woods – Hallmark Hall of Fame
- Timmy Deters – Love's Unfolding Dream – Hallmark Channel
- Chase Ellison – You've Got a Friend – Hallmark Channel
- Jon Kent Ethridge – The Last Day of Summer – Nickelodeon
- Jordan Garrett – By Appointment Only – American Cinema International
- Tyler Patrick Jones – Ben 10: Race Against Time – Cartoon Network
- Cody Benjamin Lee – The Last Day of Summer – Nickelodeon
- Braeden Lemasters – Love's Unending Legacy – Hallmark Channel
- Zach Mills – The Valley of Light – CBS
- Jake D. Smith – Tin Man – Sci-Fi Channel
- Darian Weiss – Christmas Miracle at Sage Creek – American World Pictures

=== Best Performance in a TV Movie, Miniseries or Special – Supporting Young Actress ===
★ Bailee Madison – The Last Day of Summer – Nickelodeon

- Saige Ryan Campbell – All I Want for Christmas – Hallmark Channel
- Jennette McCurdy – The Last Day of Summer – Nickelodeon
- Mary Matilyn Mouser – A Stranger's Heart – Hallmark Channel
- Haley Ramm – Ben 10: Race Against Time – Cartoon Network

== Best Performance in a TV Series ==
=== Best Performance in a TV Series – Leading Young Actor ===
★ Jamie Johnston – Degrassi: The Next Generation – CTV

- Keir Gilchrist – The Winner – FOX
- Noah Gray-Cabey – Heroes – NBC
- Carter Jenkins – Viva Laughlin – CBS
- Angus T. Jones – Two and a Half Men – CBS
- Sean Keenan – Lockie Leonard – VOOM HD
- Kyle Massey – Cory in the House – Disney Channel
- Devon Werkheiser – Ned's Declassified School Survival Guide – Nickelodeon
- Tyler James Williams – Everybody Hates Chris – CBS

=== Best Performance in a TV Series – Leading Young Actress ===
★ Miley Cyrus – Hannah Montana – Disney Channel

- Rhyon Brown – Lincoln Heights – ABC Family
- Miranda Cosgrove – iCarly – Nickelodeon
- Emma Roberts – Unfabulous – Nickelodeon
- Jamie Lynn Spears – Zoey 101 – Nickelodeon

=== Best Performance in a TV Series – Supporting Young Actor ===
★ Slade Pearce – October Road – ABC

- Dean Collins – The War at Home FOX
- Jason Dolley – Cory in the House – Disney Channel
- Alexander Gould – Weeds – Showtime
- Mitch Holleman – Reba – CW
- Mark Indelicato – Ugly Betty – ABC
- Nathan Kress – iCarly – Nickelodeon
- Daniel Magder – Life with Derek – Disney Channel
- Vincent Martella – Everybody Hates Chris – CBS
- Aidan Mitchell – The Riches – FX

=== Best Performance in a TV Series – Supporting Young Actress ===
★ Adair Tishler – Heroes – NBC

- Taylor Atelian – According to Jim – ABC
- Malese Jow – Unfabulous – Nickelodeon
- Tinashe Kachingwe – Out of Jimmy's Head – Cartoon Network
- Jennette McCurdy – iCarly – Nickelodeon
- Mary Matilyn Mouser – Life Is Wild – CW

=== Best Performance in a TV Series – Young Actor Age Ten or Younger ===
★ Dylan Minnette – Saving Grace – TNT

- Lorenzo Brino – 7th Heaven – CW
- Nikolas Brino – 7th Heaven – CW
- Joseph Castanon – I Hate My 30's – VH1
- Field Cate – Pushing Daisies – ABC
- Khamani Griffin – All of Us – CW
- Trevor Gagnon – The New Adventures of Old Christine – CBS

=== Best Performance in a TV series – Guest Starring Young Actor ===
★ Chandler Canterbury – Criminal Minds (ep: "In Birth and Death") – CBS

- Cameron Bright – The 4400 (ep: "The Wrath of Graham") – USA Network
- Nicholas Elia – Supernatural – (ep: "The Kids are Alright") – CW
- Dylan Everett – The Dresden Files (ep: "Birds of a Feather") – Sci-Fi Channel
- Colin Ford – Journeyman (ep: "Blowback") – NBC
- Soren Fulton – Bones (ep: "The Priest in the Churchyard") – FOX
- Dominic Scott Kay – Navy NCIS (ep: "Lost & Found") – CBS
- Quinn Lord – Smallville (ep: "Phantom") – CW
- Justin Martin – Cold Case (ep: "It Takes a Village") – CBS
- Dylan Patton – Cold Case (ep: "Blackout") – CBS
- Colby Paul – Pushing Daisies (ep: "Corpsicle") – ABC
- Cole Petersen – CSI: Miami (ep: "Stand Your Ground") – CBS
- Remy Thorne – Criminal Minds (ep: "Revelations") – CBS

=== Best Performance in a TV series – Guest Starring Young Actress ===
★ Jasmine Jessica Anthony – Ugly Betty (ep: "Something Wicked This Way Comes") – ABC

- Jenna Boyd – Ghost Whisperer (ep: "Children of Ghosts") – CW
- Darcy Rose Byrnes – Cold Case (ep: "A Dollar, A Dream") – CBS
- Conchita Campbell – Supernatural (ep: "Playthings") – CW
- Bailee Madison – House (ep: "Act Your Age") – NBC
- Ashlyn Sanchez – Without a Trace (ep: "Desert Springs") – TNT
- Bella Thorne – The O.C. (ep: "The Case of the Franks") – FOX

=== Best Performance in a TV series – Recurring Young Actor ===
★ Connor Price – The Dead Zone – USA Network

- Jake Cherry – Desperate Housewives – ABC
- Marc Donato – Degrassi: The Next Generation – CTV
- Caden Michael Gray – Out of Jimmy's Head – Cartoon Network
- Mick Hazen – As the World Turns – CBS
- Dominic Janes – ER – NBC
- Ty Panitz – Bones – FOX
- K'Sun Ray – Smith – CBS
- Will Shadley – Dirty Sexy Money – ABC
- Cainan Wiebe – Sanctuary – Sci-Fi Channel
- Calum Worthy – Psych – USA Network

=== Best Performance in a TV series – Recurring Young Actress ===
★ Erin Sanders – Zoey 101 – Nickelodeon

- Kristen Alderson – One Life to Live – ABC
- Rachel G. Fox – Desperate Housewives – ABC
- Chloe Greenfield – ER – NBC
- Danielle Hanratty – The Unit – CBC
- Sammi Hanratty – The Suite Life of Zack & Cody – Disney Channel
- Chloë Grace Moretz – Dirty Sexy Money – ABC
- Ryan Newman – Hannah Montana – Disney Channel
- Christina Robinson – Dexter – Showtime
- Darcy Rose Byrnes – The Young and the Restless – CBS
- Christian Serratos – Ned's Declassified School Survival Guide – Nickelodeon
- Alyson Stoner – The Suite Life of Zack & Cody – Disney Channel
- Keaton & Kylie Rae Tyndall – Big Love – HBO

=== Best Young Ensemble Performance in a TV Series ===
★ Out of Jimmy's Head – Cartoon Network

Jon Kent Ethridge, Dominic Janes, Terrence Hardy, Jr., Caden Michael Gray, Austin Rogers, Tinashe Kachingwe, Jonina Gable, Nolan Gould, Katelin Petersen and Nicole Smolen

- Hannah Montana – Disney Channel

Miley Cyrus, Emily Osment, Mitchel Musso, Moisés Arias and Cody Linley

- The Naked Brothers Band – Nickelodeon

Alex Wolff, Nat Wolff, Allie DiMeco, Thomas Batuello, David Levi, Qaasim Middleton and Cooper Pillot

- Unfabulous – Nickelodeon

Jordan Calloway, Bianca Collins, Dustin Ingram, Malese Jow, Mary Lou, Emma Roberts and Chelsea Tavares

- Wizards of Waverly Place – Disney Channel

Selena Gomez, David Henrie, Jennifer Stone and Jake T. Austin

- Zoey 101 – Nickelodeon

Jamie Lynn Spears, Paul Butcher, Sean Flynn, Victoria Justice, Christopher Massey, Erin Sanders and Matthew Underwood

== Best Performance in a Voice-Over Role ==
=== Best Performance in a Voice-Over Role – Young Actor ===
★ Paul Butcher – Meet the Robinsons – Walt Disney Feature Animation

- Marc Donato – The Future Is Wild – Discovery Kids
- Jordan Fry – Meet the Robinsons – Walt Disney Feature Animation
- Trevor Gagnon – Fly Me to the Moon – nWave Pictures
- Jake D. Smith – Tom and Jerry Tales – The CW 4 Kids

=== Best Performance in a Voice-Over Role – Young Actress ===
★ Tajja Isen – Super Why! – PBS

- Chloë Grace Moretz – My Friends Tigger & Pooh – Walt Disney
- Grace Rolek – Lou and Lou: Safety Patrol – Disney Channel

== Best Family Entertainment ==
=== Best Family Television Movie or Special ===
★ You've Got a Friend – Hallmark Channel

- High School Musical – Disney Channel
- The Last Day of Summer – Nickelodeon
- The Naked Brothers Band: The Movie – Nickelodeon

=== Best Family Television Series ===
★ Hannah Montana – Disney Channel

- Life Is Wild – CW
- The Naked Brothers Band – Nickelodeon
- Ned's Declassified School Survival Guide – Nickelodeon
- Out of Jimmy's Head – Cartoon Network
- The Winner – FOX
- Zoey 101 – Nickelodeon

=== Best Family Television Reality Show, Game Show or Documentary ===
★ Are You Smarter than a 5th Grader? – FOX

- Endurance – Discovery Kids
- Kid Nation – CBS
- My Life as a Child – TLC
- Who Cares About Girls? – Oxygen

=== Best Short Film Starring Youth ===
★ Bad – Vincenzo Giammanco (Director)

- The Bench – Revolocity
- The Black Smith and the Carpenter – Scottsdale Community College
- The Don of Virgil Junior High – Rising Nile Productions
- Far Sighted – Filmmakers Alliance
- The Infamous Buddy Blade – Delaware Coalition Films
- The Velveteen Rabbit – Denise Quesnel (Director)

=== Best International Feature Film ===
★ La Misma Luna (Under the Same Moon) – Mexico

- Breakfast with Scot – Canada
- Die Wilden Kerle 4 (The Wild Soccer Bunch 4) – Germany
- Le Renard et l'Enfant (The Fox and The Child) – France
- O Ano em que Meus Pais Saíram de Férias (The Year My Parents Went on Vacation) – Brazil

=== Best Family Feature Film (Animation) ===
★ Ratatouille – Walt Disney Studios

- Bee Movie – DreamWorks SKG
- Meet the Robinsons – Walt Disney Animation
- Surf's Up – Sony Pictures Animation

=== Best Family Feature Film (Fantasy or Musical) ===
★ Bridge to Terabithia – Walden Media

- Alvin and the Chipmunks – 20th Century Fox
- The Golden Compass – New Line Cinema
- Underdog – Walt Disney Pictures
- The Water Horse: Legend of the Deep – Columbia Pictures

=== Best Family Feature Film (Comedy or Drama) ===
★ August Rush – Warner Brothers

- Evan Almighty – Universal Pictures
- Firehouse Dog – 20th Century Fox
- Hairspray – New Line Cinema
- The Last Mimzy – New Line Cinema
- Martian Child – New Line Cinema
- Nancy Drew – Warner Brothers

== Special awards ==
=== Outstanding Young Performance in Live Theatre ===
★ Sara Niemietz as "Patrice" in 13 – Mark Taper Forum, Los Angeles

=== Former Child Star – Life Achievement Award ===
★ Jim Turner – Kung Fu

=== Outstanding Young Performer in a Foreign Film ===
★ Vlad Vyuzhanin – Fatherland or Death – Russia

=== Social Relations of Knowledge Institute Award ===
★ Nova – PBS
