= HPA Award for Outstanding Editing – Television (30 Minutes and Under) =

Annual award given by the Hollywood Professional Association

The Hollywood Professional Association Award for Outstanding Editing - Television (30 Minutes and Under) is an annual award given by the Hollywood Professional Association (HPA) to post production workers in the film and television industry, in this case film editors. While television editors have been awarded since 2006, the category first marked a distinction between half-hour series and series longer than that in 2018.

== Winners and nominees ==
- † – indicates a winner of a Primetime Emmy Award for Editing.
- ‡ – indicates a nomination for a Primetime Emmy Award for Editing.

=== 2000s ===
Outstanding Editing - Television

Year	Program	Episode(s)	Nominees	Network
2006
2006	Arrested Development		Stuart Bass	Fox
2006	Criminal Minds		Jimmy Giritlian	CBS
2006	Medium	"Death Takes a Policy"	Sondra Watanabe	NBC
2007
2007	Bury My Heart at Wounded Knee †		Michael D. Ornstein	HBO
2007	The Company	"Episode 2"	Scott Vickrey	TNT
2007	Rome	"De Patre Vostro (About Your Father)"	David Siegel	HBO
2008
2008	Pushing Daisies	"Pie-lette" †	Stuart Bass	ABC
2008	Breaking Bad	"Pilot" †	Lynne Willingham	AMC
2008	Mad Men	"Indian Summer"	David Siegel	AMC
2009
2009	Breaking Bad	"ABQ" †	Lynne Willingham	AMC
2009	Dollhouse	"Omega"	Harry B. Miller III	Fox
2009	Lie to Me	"Sacrifice"	David Siegel and David C. Cook	Fox

=== 2010s ===
Year	Program	Episode(s)	Nominees	Network
2010
2010	Lost	"The End" †	Mark Goldman, Christopher Nelson, Stephen Semel and Henk Van Eeghan	ABC
2010	Dexter	"Remains to Be Seen"	Louis Cioffi	Showtime
2010	Glee	"Dream On"	Doc Crotzer	Fox
2010	Glee	"Journey to Regionals"	Bradley Buecker	Fox
2010	Glee	"The Power of Madonna"	Joe Leonard	Fox
2011
2011	Downton Abbey	"Episode One" ‡	John Wilson	PBS
2011	Community	"A Fistful of Paintballs"	Steven Sprung and Peter B. Ellis	NBC
2011	Dexter	"Take It!" ‡	Louis Cioffi	Showtime
2011	Rescue Me	"Vows"	Finnian Murray	FX
2011	The Wereth Eleven		Frederic Lumiere	
2012
2012	Downton Abbey	"Episode Seven" ‡	John Wilson	PBS
2012	Breaking Bad	"Face Off" ‡	Skip MacDonald	AMC
2012	Boardwalk Empire	"Under God's Power She Flourishes"	Kate Sanford	HBO
2012	Dexter	"Those Kinds of Things"	Louis Cioffi	Showtime
2012	Final Witness	"Graveyard Love"	Miky Wolf	ABC
2012	Homeland	"Pilot" †	Jordan Goldman and David Latham	Showtime
2013
2013	Breaking Bad	"Dead Freight" ‡	Skip MacDonald	AMC
2013	American Horror Story: Asylum	"Welcome to Briarcliff"	Joe Leonard and Bradley Buecker	FX
2013	Breaking Bad	"Gliding Over All" †	Kelley Dixon	AMC
2013	Dexter	"Are You...?"	Louis Cioffi	Showtime
2013	Downton Abbey	"Episode Five"	Joe Wilson	PBS
2014
2014	Breaking Bad	"Felina" †	Skip MacDonald	AMC
2014	The Good Wife	"Hitting the Fan"	Scott Vickery	CBS
2014	House of Cards	"Chapter 14" ‡	Byron Smith	Netflix
2014	House of Cards	"Chapter 26"	Cindy Mollo	Netflix
2014	The Sixties	"The Assassination of President Kennedy" ‡	Chris A. Peterson	CNN
2015
2015	Foo Fighters: Sonic Highways	"Nashville"	Kristin McCasey	HBO
2015	Foo Fighters: Sonic Highways	"Austin"	Scott D. Hanson	HBO
2015	Game of Thrones	"Hardhome" ‡	Tim Porter	HBO
2015	House of Cards	"Chapter 32"	Cindy Mollo	Netflix
2015	Vice	"Cold War 2.0"	Richard Lowe	HBO
2016
2016	Game of Thrones	"Battle of the Bastards" †	Tim Porter	HBO
2016	Roots	"Part 1"	Martin Nicholson and Greg Babor	History
2016	Body Team 12		David Darg	HBO
2016	Underground	"The Macon 7"	Zack Arnold and Ian S. Tan	WGN
2016	Vinyl	"Pilot"	David Tedeschi	HBO
2017
2017	Stranger Things	"Chapter One: The Vanishing of Will Byers" †	Dean Zimmerman	Netflix
2017	Game of Thrones	"Dragonstone"	Crispin Green	HBO
2017	Game of Thrones	"The Queen's Justice"	Jesse Parker	HBO
2017	Game of Thrones	"Stormborn"	Tim Porter	HBO
2017	Narcos	"Al Fin Cayó!"	Matthew Colonna and Trevor Baker	Netflix
2017	Westworld	"The Original"	Stephen Semel and Marc Jozefowicz	HBO

Outstanding Editing - Television (30 Minutes and Under)

Year	Program	Episode(s)	Nominees	Network
2018
2018	Vice	"After the Fall"	Kelly Kendrick	HBO
2018	Barry	"Chapter Eight: Know Your Truth" ‡	Kyle Reiter	HBO
2018	The End of the F***ing World	"Episode 1"	Mike Jones	Netflix
2018	Vice Principals	"The Union of the Wizard & The Warrior"	Justin Bourret	HBO
2018	Vida	"Episode 6"	JoAnne Yarrow	Starz
2019
2019	Veep	"Pledge"	Roger Nygard	HBO
2019	Homecoming	"Redwood"	Rosanne Tan	Amazon
2019	Russian Doll	"Ariadne" ‡	Laura Weinberg	Netflix
2019	Russian Doll	"The Way Out"	Todd Downing	Netflix
2019	Withorwithout		Jake Shaver and Shannon Albrink	Online

== Programs with multiple awards ==
3 awards

- Breaking Bad (AMC)

2 awards

- Downton Abbey (PBS)

== Programs with multiple nominations ==
6 nominations

- Breaking Bad (CBS)

5 nominations

- Game of Thrones (HBO)

4 nominations

- Dexter (Showtime)

3 nominations

- Downton Abbey (PBS)
- Glee (Fox)
- House of Cards (Netflix)

2 nominations

- Foo Fighters: Sonic Highways (HBO)
- Russian Doll (Netflix)
- Vice (HBO)

== See also ==
- List of American television awards
