= Homecoming (podcast) =

Psychological thriller podcast by Gimlet

- Genre: Psychological thriller
- Language: English

Creative team
- Written by: Micah Bloomberg; Eli Horowitz

Cast and voices
- Starring: Catherine Keener; Oscar Isaac; David Schwimmer

Production
- Production: Mark Phillips
- Length: 20–30 minutes

Publication
- No. of seasons: 2
- No. of episodes: 12
- Original release: November 9, 2016 – August 23, 2017
- Provider: Gimlet Media

Related
- Adaptations: Homecoming
- Website: gimletmedia.com/shows/homecoming

Homecoming is a scripted psychological thriller podcast produced by Gimlet Media and starring Catherine Keener, Oscar Isaac, and David Schwimmer.

== Background ==
The podcast debuted on November 9, 2016, and was the first scripted fiction podcast produced by Gimlet Media. The cast includes Catherine Keener as Heidi Bergman, Oscar Isaac as Walter Cruz, and David Schwimmer as Colin Belfast. The sound design was done by Mark Phillips. The story was written by Micah Bloomberg and Eli Horowitz. The story is set in Florida and follows a case worker and a veteran involved in a government program called the homecoming initiative. The second season of the podcast debuted on July 19, 2017.

== Reception ==
The show was nominated for a Peabody Award in 2016 and won two Webby Awards in 2017.

== Adaptation ==
The podcast was adapted into a television series, starring Stephan James and Julia Roberts. It was released on Amazon Prime on November 2, 2018.
