= Rosanne Tan =

American television and film editor

- Born: Kuala Lumpur, Malaysia
- Occupation: Editor
- Years active: 2003–present
- Website: rosannetan.com

Rosanne Tan, ACE, is an American film and television editor. She is best known for her work on Homecoming, Mr. Robot, The Falcon and the Winter Soldier, Hawkeye, and Ahsoka.

== Life and career ==
Rosanne was born in Kuala Lumpur, Malaysia and grew up in Los Angeles, CA. She graduated from Arcadia High School and earned her degree from Pasadena City College. She began her career in the film and television industry working on non-scripted projects before moving over to scripted.

Rosanne has been a member of the American Cinema Editors since 2019 and is currently a mentor in their Diversity Mentorship program..

== Filmography ==
Year	Title	Role	Note
2012	Fifteen Digits	Editor	Short film
2014–2015	Stalker	Editor	7 episodes
2014–2015	The Following	Editor	2 episodes
2015	Scorpion	Editor	1 episode
2015	Pass the Light	Editor	Feature film
2016	Containment	Editor	4 episodes
2017	Time After Time	Editor	5 episodes
2017–2019	Mr. Robot	Editor	6 episodes
2018	Seven Seconds	Editor	2 episodes
2018	Tell Me a Story	Editor	2 episodes
2018	Homecoming	Editor	4 episodes
2019	NOS4A2	Editor	2 episodes
2021	The Falcon and the Winter Soldier	Editor	2 episodes
2021	Hawkeye	Editor	2 episodes
2023	Ahsoka	Editor	3 episodes
2025	The Waterfront	Editor	2 episodes
2025	Ironheart	Editor	3 episodes

== Awards and nominations ==
Year	Result	Award	Category	Work	Ref.
2019	Nominated	HPA Awards	Outstanding Editing – Television (30 Minutes and Under)	Homecoming : "Redwood"	
2019	Nominated	American Cinema Editors	Best Edited Drama Series for Non-Commercial Television	Homecoming : "Redwood"	
2020	Nominated	American Cinema Editors	Best Edited Drama Series for Commercial Television	Mr. Robot : "401 Unauthorized"	
2021	Nominated	American Cinema Editors	Best Edited Drama Series for Commercial Television	Mr. Robot : "405 Method Not Allowed"	
