= Megan McKinnon =

Canadian actress

- Born: Megan Elizabeth McKinnon; February 5, 1996 (age 30); Lindsay, Ontario, Canada
- Occupation: Actress
- Years active: 2001–present
- Website: http://www.meganmckinnon.com/

Megan Elizabeth McKinnon (born February 5, 1996) is a Canadian actress with more than 50 credits to her name.

McKinnon was born in Lindsay, Ontario, Canada. She has appeared in over 40 independent films in Vancouver, British Columbia, Canada, such as Samantha's Art, in which she was nominated for a Young Artist Award in 2005, and The Bully Solution, a short created in 48 hours as a part of the Vancouver Bloodshots Film Festival, October 2005. This film won 1st place by judge Robert Rodriguez (director of Spy Kids).

More recently, she played the role of Wendy in the feature film The Last Mimzy, and the role of Young Allie in the feature film Project Grey. She won the 2007 Young Artist Award for the title role in Little Samantha Tripp.

== Filmography ==
=== Film ===
Megan McKinnon' film credits
Year	Title	Role	Notes
2001	Old Breed	Young Deidre	Short film
2003	Letters from France	Amanda	Short film
2003	Bedroom Doors	Julie	Short film
2003	Conception	Young Girl	Short film
2004	Adolescent Nation	Niece	Short film
2005	Samantha's Art	Samantha	Short film
2005	Crazy Late	Wedding Party	Short film
2005	The Bully Solution	Sally	Direct-to-video; Short film
2006	Eight Below	Kayak Girl	Uncredited
2006	The Saddest Boy in the World	Maria	Short film
2006	Happy Valentine's Day	Kendra-Lee	Short film
2006	Behind the Camera: The Unauthorized Story of 'Diff'rent Strokes'	Girl Seeking Autograph	Television film Uncredited
2006	Little Samantha Tripp	Samantha Tripp	Short film
2007	The Last Mimzy	Wendy	
2007	Whisper	Bratty Party Girl	Uncredited
2007	Project Grey	Young Allie	
2008	Illusional	Tessa	
2009	The Tricks	Abby	Short film

=== Television ===
Megan McKinnon' television credits
Year	Title	Role	Notes
2001	Twice Upon a Christmas	Girl In Daycare	Television film Uncredited
2002	Monk	Girl with a Cold	Episode: "Mr. Monk and the Candidate"; Uncredited
2002	Masters of Horror	Pam Embry	Episode: "We All Scream for Ice Cream"; Uncredited
2004	The Five People You Meet in Heaven	Scottish Flower Girl	Television film
2012	Mr. Young	Kiss Cam Girl	Episode: "Mr. Spring Break"
2016	Tricked	Girl with Cellphone	Episode: "Technology"
2018	Christmas in Evergreen: Letters to Santa	Choir Member	Television film Uncredited
2018	The Flash	Saved Girl	Episode: "O Come, All Ye Thankful"; Uncredited

== Awards and nominations ==
Year (Note: Indicates the year of ceremony. Each year is linked to the article about the awards held that year, wherever possible.)	Award	Category	Film	Result
2010	Young Artist Awards	Best Performance in a Short Film - Young Actress	The Tricks	Nominated
2009	Young Artist Awards	Best Performance in a Short Film - Young Actress	Illusional	Nominated
2008	Young Artist Awards	Best Performance in a Feature Film - Young Actress Age Ten or Younger	Project Grey	Nominated
2008	Young Artist Awards	Best Performance in a Feature Film - Young Ensemble Cast	The Last Mimzy	Nominated
2007	Young Artist Awards	Best Performance in a Short Film - Young Actress	Little Samantha Tripp	Won
2005	Young Artist Awards	Best Performance in a Short Film - Young Actress	Samantha's Art	Nominated
