= Chevez Ezaneh =

Canadian actor

Chevez Ezaneh (born August 12, 1992) is a young Dene actor who has played characters who are Native Americans, including the young Charles Eastman in the HBO TV film Bury My Heart at Wounded Knee. Ezaneh won a Young Artist Award in 2008 for the "Best Performance in a TV Movie.

== Appearances ==
Year	Title	Role	Notes
2005	Shania: A Life in Eight Albums	Darryl, 8-13 yrs	TV Bio-pic
2007	Bury My Heart at Wounded Knee	Ohiyesa/Young Charles	TV film (HBO)
2008	Into the West	White Feather	TV mini-series
2008	Renegadepress.com	Cecil	TV series (2 episodes)
2009	We Shall Remain: Part II - Tecumseh's Vision	Young Tecumseh	An episode of "The American Experience"
