= Joseph Castanon =

American actor and singer-songwriter

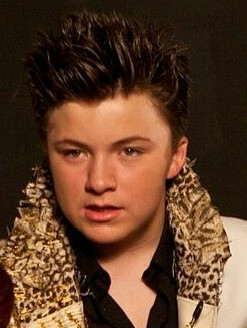
- Castanon in 2010
- Born: Joseph Michael Castanon; August 23, 1997 (age 29); Denver, Colorado, U.S.
- Occupations: Actor; singer-songwriter
- Years active: 2005–2014

Joseph Michael Castanon (born August 19, 1997), better known by his stage name Sir Castanon, is an American retired actor and singer-songwriter. He was also known for his role as Ben Newman in the comedy Click (2006).

== Acting career ==
He has appeared in several television series, including Jericho, NCIS, I Hate My 30's, Crossing Jordan, Without A Trace, October Road, ER, a mini series Comanche Moon, and won the 2006 Young Artist Award for Guest Starring Young Actor in a TV series for an appearance on Ghost Whisperer. That same year, he made his feature film debut playing Ben Newman, son of Adam Sandler's character in the comedy Click.

== Music career ==
Castanon became serious about music after he booked the starring role in the West Coast Ensemble stage production of "Big the Musical" in the fall of 2008. It was then he realized his love for performing in front of live audiences. He joined forces and began writing and recording with multi-award winning writer and producer Jonathan George. The two-year journey of development and work spawned the artist Sir Castanon. He released his debut album, Puppeteer, on iTunes and CD Baby on December 28, 2010.

== Filmography ==
=== Film ===
| Year | Title | Role | Notes |
|---|---|---|---|
| 2006 | De Las Calles | Dario | Short film |
| 2006 | Click | 7-Year-Old Ben Newman | |
| 2007 | Dead Write | Rufus | |
| 2007 | Little Wings | Thomas | Short film |
| 2007 | Plot 7 | Matthew McCarthy | |
| 2008 | The 7th Claus | Charlie | Short film |
| 2009 | Santa's Little Helper | Marlon | Short film |
| 2010 | Happiness Runs | Little Mackie | |
| 2010 | Nic & Tristan Go Mega Dega | Commercial Kid | |
| 2011 | Hard Hats | Mervin Jones | Short film |
| 2011 | Prodigal | Young Levi | |
| 2014 | Brothers | The Boy | Short film |

=== Television ===
| Year | Title | Role | Notes |
|---|---|---|---|
| 2005 | Wanted | Boy | Episode: "Badlands" |
| 2005 | Ghost Whisperer | Kenny Dale | Episode: "The Crossing" |
| 2005 | Crossing Jordan | Brandon Holloman | Episode: "Judgement Day" |
| 2005 | NCIS | Zach Tanner | Episode: "Honor Code" |
| 2006 | Without a Trace | Ethan Heller | Episode: "The Little Things" |
| 2006 | Pepper Dennis | Bucky | Episode: "Saving Venice" |
| 2006–2008 | Jericho | Woody Taylor | 3 episodes |
| 2006 | Shark | Ethan Sterling | Episode: "Dr. Feelbad" |
| 2007 | I Hate My 30's | Bickle | 2 episodes |
| 2007 | ER | Reggie Santo | Episode: "Gravity" |
| 2008 | October Road | Jimmy Crack Kornduffer | Episode: "Spelling It Out" |
| 2008 | Comanche Moon | Newt | Episode: "Part 3" |

=== Awards and nominations ===
| Year | Award | Category | Nominated work | Result |
|---|---|---|---|---|
| 2006 | Young Artist Awards | Best Performance in a Comedy or Drama Television Series – Guest Starring Young Actor | Ghost Whisperer | Won |
| 2007 | Young Artist Awards | Best Performance in a Comedy or Drama Television Series – Guest Starring Young Actor | Shark | Nominated |
| 2008 | Young Artist Awards | Best Performance in a TV Series – Young Actor Ten or Under | I Hate My 30's | Nominated |
| 2008 | Young Artist Awards | Best Performance in a Short Film – Young Actor | Little Wings | Nominated |
| 2009 | Young Artist Awards | Best Performance in a TV Movie, Miniseries or Special – Supporting Young Actor | Comanche Moon | Won |
| 2010 | Young Artist Awards | Best Performance in a Short Film – Young Actor | Santa's Little Helper | Nominated |
