= Bury My Heart at Wounded Knee (film) =

2007 US TV film directed by Yves Simoneau

- Genre: Western; Historical drama
- Based on: Bury My Heart at Wounded Knee by Dee Brown
- Written by: Daniel Giat
- Directed by: Yves Simoneau
- Starring: Aidan Quinn; Adam Beach; August Schellenberg; Anna Paquin
- Music by: George S. Clinton
- Country of origin: United States
- Original language: English

Production
- Executive producers: Dick Wolf; Tom Thayer
- Producer: Clara George
- Production locations: Calgary, Alberta, Canada
- Cinematography: David Franco
- Editors: Michael Brown; Michael D. Ornstein
- Running time: 132 minutes
- Production companies: Wolf Films; Traveler's Rest Films

Original release
- Network: HBO
- Release: May 27, 2007

Bury My Heart at Wounded Knee is a 2007 American Western historical drama television film based on the 1970 non-fiction book of the same name by Dee Brown. It is directed by Yves Simoneau and was produced by Wolf Films for HBO. It stars Aidan Quinn, Adam Beach, August Schellenberg, Anna Paquin, Colm Feore, and Gordon Tootoosis.

The film dramatizes the history of Native Americans in the American West in the 1860s and 1870s, focusing upon the transition from traditional ways of living to living on reservations and their treatment during that period, through the lives of four main characters: Charles Eastman (Beach), Sitting Bull (Schellenberg), Henry L. Dawes (Quinn), and Red Cloud (Tootoosis). The title of the film and the book is taken from a line in the Stephen Vincent Benét poem "American Names."

The film premiered on HBO on May 27, 2007. It received positive reviews from critics, and won seven Primetime Emmy Awards, including Outstanding Television Movie. It was also nominated for three Golden Globe Awards: Best Limited or Anthology Series or Television Film, Best Actor – Miniseries or Television Film for Beach, and Best Actress – Miniseries or Television Film for Paquin.

== Plot ==
The plot, which is based on events covered by several chapters of Brown's book, other sources, and on real events, revolves around four main characters:

- Charles Eastman né Ohiyesa, a young, mixed-race Sioux doctor educated at Dartmouth and Boston University, who is held up as proof of the success of assimilation
- Sitting Bull, the Sioux chief who refuses to submit to U.S. government policies designed to strip his people of their identity, their dignity and their sacred land, the gold-laden Black Hills of the Dakotas
- U.S. Senator Henry L. Dawes, an architect of government policy for allotment of Indian lands to individual households to force adoption of subsistence farming
- Red Cloud, whose decision to make peace with the American government and go to a reservation disturbed Sitting Bull.

While Eastman and his future wife Elaine Goodale, a reformer from New England and Superintendent of Indian Schools in the Dakotas, work to improve life for Native Americans on the reservation, Senator Dawes lobbies President Ulysses S. Grant for more humane treatment of the Native Americans. He opposes the adversarial stance of General William Tecumseh Sherman. The Dawes Commission (held from 1893 to 1914) develops a proposal to break up the Great Sioux Reservation to allow for American demands for land while preserving enough land for the Sioux to live on. The Commission's plan is held up by Sitting Bull's opposition. He has risen to leadership among the Sioux as one of the last chiefs to fight for their independence. Dawes, in turn, urges Eastman to help him convince the recalcitrant tribal leaders. After witnessing conditions on the Sioux reservation, Eastman refuses.

The prophet Wovoka raised Western Native American hopes with his spiritual movement based on a revival of religious practice and the ritual Ghost Dance; it was a messianic movement that promised an end of their suffering under the white man. The assassination of Sitting Bull, and the massacre, by the 7th Cavalry, of nearly 200 Native American men, women and children at Wounded Knee Creek on December 29, 1890, ended such hopes.

Henry L. Dawes wanted to increase the cultural assimilation of Native Americans into American society by his Dawes Act (1887) and his later efforts as head of the Dawes Commission. During the 47 years of implementing the Act, Native Americans lost about 90 million acres (360,000 km^{2}) of treaty land, or about two-thirds of their 1887 land base. About 90,000 Native Americans were made landless. The implementation of the Dawes Act disrupted Native American tribes' traditional communal life, culture, and unity.

== Cast ==
- Adam Beach as Ohiyesa / Charles Eastman
  - Chevez Ezaneh as Young Ohiyesa / Charles Eastman
- Aidan Quinn as Henry L. Dawes
- August Schellenberg as Chief Sitting Bull
- Anna Paquin as Elaine Goodale
- Colm Feore as General William Tecumseh Sherman
- Gordon Tootoosis as Chief Red Cloud
- Fred Dalton Thompson as President Ulysses S. Grant
- Duane Howard as Uncle
- Nathan Lee Chasing His Horse as One Bull
- Brian Stollery as Bishop Whipple
- Shaun Johnston as Colonel Nelson A. Miles
- Billy Merasty as Chief Young Man Afraid of His Horses
- Morris Birdyellowhead as Chief American Horse
- Eddie Spears as Chasing Crane
- Sean Wei Mah as Bull Head
- Eric Schweig as Chief Gall
- Jimmy Herman as Yellow Bird
- Patrick St. Esprit as Major James Walsh
- J.K. Simmons as James McLaughlin
- Wes Studi as Wovoka / Jack Wilson
- Marty Atonini as Colonel James W. Forsyth
- Lee Tergesen as Daniel F. Royer

== Production ==
The film was shot in Calgary, Alberta, Canada.

== Awards and nominations ==
Award	Year	Category	Nominee(s)	Result	Ref.
Artios Awards	2007	Outstanding Achievement in Casting – TV Movie of the Week	René Haynes	Won	
Hollywood Post Alliance Awards	2007	Outstanding Color Grading – Television	Kevin O'Connor	Nominated	
Hollywood Post Alliance Awards	2007	Outstanding Editing – Television	Michael Ornstein	Won	
Online Film & Television Association Awards	2007	Best Motion Picture		Won	
Online Film & Television Association Awards	2007	Best Supporting Actor in a Motion Picture or Miniseries	Aidan Quinn	Nominated	
Online Film & Television Association Awards	2007	Best Supporting Actor in a Motion Picture or Miniseries	August Schellenberg	Nominated	
Online Film & Television Association Awards	2007	Best Supporting Actress in a Motion Picture or Miniseries	Anna Paquin	Won	
Online Film & Television Association Awards	2007	Best Direction of a Motion Picture or Miniseries	Yves Simoneau	Won	
Online Film & Television Association Awards	2007	Best Writing of a Motion Picture or Miniseries	Daniel Giat	Nominated	
Online Film & Television Association Awards	2007	Best Ensemble in a Motion Picture or Miniseries		Won	
Online Film & Television Association Awards	2007	Best Costume Design in a Motion Picture or Miniseries		Won	
Online Film & Television Association Awards	2007	Best Editing in a Motion Picture or Miniseries		Nominated	
Online Film & Television Association Awards	2007	Best Lighting in a Motion Picture or Miniseries		Won	
Online Film & Television Association Awards	2007	Best Makeup/Hairstyling in a Motion Picture or Miniseries		Nominated	
Online Film & Television Association Awards	2007	Best Music in a Motion Picture or Miniseries		Won	
Online Film & Television Association Awards	2007	Best Production Design in a Motion Picture or Miniseries		Won	
Online Film & Television Association Awards	2007	Best Sound in a Motion Picture or Miniseries		Nominated	
Primetime Emmy Awards	2007	Outstanding Made for Television Movie	Dick Wolf, Tom Thayer, Yves Simoneau, and Clara George	Won	
Primetime Emmy Awards	2007	Outstanding Supporting Actor in a Miniseries or a Movie	Aidan Quinn	Nominated	
Primetime Emmy Awards	2007	Outstanding Supporting Actor in a Miniseries or a Movie	August Schellenberg	Nominated	
Primetime Emmy Awards	2007	Outstanding Supporting Actress in a Miniseries or a Movie	Anna Paquin	Nominated	
Primetime Emmy Awards	2007	Outstanding Directing for a Miniseries, Movie or a Dramatic Special	Yves Simoneau	Nominated	
Primetime Emmy Awards	2007	Outstanding Writing for a Miniseries, Movie or a Dramatic Special	Daniel Giat	Nominated	
Primetime Creative Arts Emmy Awards	2007	Outstanding Art Direction for a Miniseries or Movie	Ian Thomas, D.A. Menchions, and Paul Healy	Nominated	
Primetime Creative Arts Emmy Awards	2007	Outstanding Casting for a Miniseries, Movie or a Special	René Haynes, Rhonda Fisekci, and Candice Elzinga	Nominated	
Primetime Creative Arts Emmy Awards	2007	Outstanding Cinematography for a Miniseries, Movie or a Special	David Franco	Won	
Primetime Creative Arts Emmy Awards	2007	Outstanding Costumes for a Miniseries, Movie or a Special	Mario Davignon, Micheline Rouillard, and Jill Blackie	Nominated	
Primetime Creative Arts Emmy Awards	2007	Outstanding Hairstyling for a Miniseries, Movie or a Special	Iloe Flewelling, Chris Harrison, Heather Smith, and Penny Thompson	Nominated	
Primetime Creative Arts Emmy Awards	2007	Outstanding Makeup for a Miniseries, Movie or a Special (Non-Prosthetic)	Gail Kennedy, Rochelle Pomerleau, and Joanne Preece	Won	
Primetime Creative Arts Emmy Awards	2007	Outstanding Music Composition for a Miniseries, Movie or a Special (Original Dramatic Score)	George S. Clinton	Nominated	
Primetime Creative Arts Emmy Awards	2007	Outstanding Single-Camera Picture Editing for a Miniseries or a Movie	Michael Ornstein and Michael Brown	Won	
Primetime Creative Arts Emmy Awards	2007	Outstanding Sound Editing for a Miniseries, Movie or a Special	Stephen Hunter Flick, Avram Gold, Steffan Falesitch, Eric Hertsgaard, Patricio Libenson, Denise Horta, Adam Johnston, Paul Berolzheimer, Dean Beville, Jeff Sawyer, Ken Young, Mike Flicker, David Lee Fein, and Hilda Hodges	Won	
Primetime Creative Arts Emmy Awards	2007	Outstanding Sound Mixing for a Miniseries or a Movie	George Tarrant, Rick Ash, and Edward C. Carr III	Won	
Primetime Creative Arts Emmy Awards	2007	Outstanding Special Visual Effects for a Miniseries, Movie or a Special	David Goldberg, Chris Del Conte, Joseph Bell, Justin Mitchell, Erik Bruhwiler, Tommy Tran, Benoit Girard, Tammy Sutton, and Andrew Roberts	Nominated	
Satellite Awards	2007	Best Motion Picture Made for Television		Nominated	
Satellite Awards	2007	Best Actor in a Miniseries or Motion Picture Made for Television	Aidan Quinn	Nominated	
American Cinema Editors Awards	2008	Best Edited Miniseries or Motion Picture for Non-Commercial Television	Michael Ornstein and Michael Brown	Nominated	
American Society of Cinematographers Awards	2008	Outstanding Achievement in Cinematography in Television Movie/Miniseries/Pilot	David Franco	Nominated	
Cinema Audio Society Awards	2008	Outstanding Achievement in Sound Mixing for Television Movies and Miniseries	George Tarrant, Rick Ash, and Edward C. Carr III	Won	
Costume Designers Guild Awards	2008	Outstanding Made for Television Movie or Miniseries	Mario Davignon	Won	
Critics' Choice Awards	2008	Best Picture Made for Television		Won	
Directors Guild of America Awards	2008	Outstanding Directorial Achievement in Movies for Television or Miniseries	Yves Simoneau	Won	
Golden Globe Awards	2008	Best Miniseries or Television Film		Nominated	
Golden Globe Awards	2008	Best Actor in a Miniseries or Motion Picture Made for Television	Adam Beach	Nominated	
Golden Globe Awards	2008	Best Supporting Actress – Series, Miniseries or Television Film	Anna Paquin	Nominated	
Golden Reel Awards	2008	Best Sound Editing – Dialogue and ADR for Long Form Television	Stephen Hunter Flick, Avram D. Gold, Steffan Falesitch, Eric Hertsguaard, and Patricio A. Libenson	Won	
Golden Reel Awards	2008	Best Sound Editing – Sound Effects and Foley for Long Form Television	Stephen Hunter Flick, Avram D. Gold, Paul Berolzheimer, Dean Beville, Adam Johnston, Jeff Sawyer, Kenneth Young, David Fine, and Hilda Hodges	Won	
Humanitas Prize	2008	90 Minute or Longer Network or Syndicated Television	Daniel Giat	Won	
NAACP Image Awards	2008	Outstanding Television Movie, Mini-Series or Dramatic Special		Nominated	
NAACP Image Awards	2008	Outstanding Actor in a Television Movie, Mini-Series or Dramatic Special	Adam Beach	Nominated	
Producers Guild of America Awards	2008	David L. Wolper Award for Outstanding Producer of Long-Form Television	Clara George, Tom Thayer, and Dick Wolf	Won	
Screen Actors Guild Awards	2008	Outstanding Performance by a Female Actor in a Miniseries or Television Movie	Anna Paquin	Nominated	
Visual Effects Society Awards	2008	Outstanding Created Environment in a Live Action Broadcast Program, Commercial or Music Video	Phi Tran, Matthew Lee, Martin Hilke, and Justin Mitchell (for "002_05")	Won	
Western Heritage Awards	2008	Television Feature Film		Won	
Writers Guild of America Awards	2008	Long Form – Adaptation	Daniel Giat – Based on the book by Dee Brown	Nominated	
Young Artist Awards	2008	Best Performance in a TV Movie, Miniseries or Special – Leading Young Actor	Chevez Ezaneh	Won	
