= Andrew St. John (actor) =

American actor (born 1982)

- Born: July 9, 1982 (age 44); Millinocket, Maine, U.S.
- Occupation: Actor
- Years active: 2003–2014

Andrew St. John (born July 9, 1982) is an American actor who portrayed Kyle Ratcliffe on ABC's soap opera General Hospital during the 2003 season. Also, he also had a guest-starring role on CBS' CSI: Crime Scene Investigation spinoff CSI: Miami as ill-fated teen Daniel (Danny) Kleiner in 2004 and then again in 2005 on CBS' third primetime spinoff from CSI: Crime Scene Investigation, CSI: NY, as Dalton. He also starred on the short-lived CW drama series Life is Wild. He was born in Millinocket, Maine

== Television ==
Title	Year	Role	Notes
NCIS	2014	Abraham Lycek	1 episode
Days of Our Lives	2011	Tyler	2 episodes
Greek	2009	Nate Radcliffe	1 episode
Life is Wild	2007–2008	Jesse Weller	13 episodes- Starring role
Vanished	2006	Chad Rainer	1 episode
Criminal Minds	2006	Jeremy Collins	1 episode
CSI: NY	2005	Dalton	1 episode
CSI: Miami	2004	Daniel Kleiner	S3:E4 "Murder in a Flash"
What I Like About You	2004	Bike Messenger	1 episode
General Hospital	2003	Kyle Ratcliffe	13 episodes

== Filmography ==
Title	Year	Role	Notes
The Assignment	2010	Billy Price	
The Caretaker	2008	Topher	
Homefront	2005	Robert Buckley	
Three Wishes	2003		
