= Fido (film) =

2006 film by Andrew Currie

- Theatrical release poster
- Directed by: Andrew Currie
- Written by: Robert Chomiak; Andrew Currie; Dennis Heaton
- Story by: Dennis Heaton
- Produced by: Trent Carlson; Blake Corbet; Mary Anne Waterhouse; Kevin Eastwood; Patrick Cassavetti
- Starring: Carrie-Anne Moss; Billy Connolly; Dylan Baker; K'Sun Ray; Henry Czerny; Tim Blake Nelson
- Cinematography: Jan Kiesser
- Edited by: Roger Mattiussi
- Music by: Don Macdonald
- Production companies: Anagram Pictures; British Columbia Film Commission; Telefilm Canada
- Distributed by: TVA Films
- Release dates: September 7, 2006 (TIFF); March 9, 2007 (Canada)
- Running time: 91 minutes
- Country: Canada
- Language: English
- Box office: $426,224

Fido is a 2006 Canadian zombie comedy film directed by Andrew Currie and written by Robert Chomiak, Currie, and Dennis Heaton from an original story by Heaton. It was produced by Blake Corbet, Mary Anne Waterhouse, Trent Carlson, and Kevin Eastwood of Anagram Pictures, and released in the United States by Lions Gate Entertainment.

== Plot ==
The film takes place in a 1950s-esque alternate universe where radiation from space has turned the dead into zombies. This resulted in the "Zombie Wars", where humanity battled zombies to prevent a zombie apocalypse, with humanity the ultimate victor. The radiation still plagues humanity, as all those who die turn into the undead, unless the dead body is disposed of by decapitation or cremation. To continue living normal lives, communities are fenced with the help of a governing corporation named ZomCon, which provides collars with accompanying remote controls to control the zombies' hunger for flesh so as to use them as menial-task servants.

In the town of Willard, housewife Helen Robinson buys a zombie in spite of her husband Bill's zombie phobia, as Bill had to kill his own father, who had become a zombie and tried to eat him. Their son, Timmy, befriends the zombie, naming him "Fido", little is revealed of his "pre-zombie" life, except that he likely died of myocardial infarction as evidenced by the chest incision. One day, Fido's collar malfunctions and he accidentally kills their nextdoor neighbor, who turns into a zombie. Timmy "kills" the zombified neighbor later, but not before she kills and infects another person, causing a small zombie outbreak. ZomCon security forces quell the situation and then investigate what caused the outbreak.

When a pair of local bullies gets caught shooting a ZomCon officer, they are suspected of shooting the missing neighbor, but they put the blame on Fido, who hurt them when they tried bullying Timmy. The bullies later capture Fido and Timmy, who are out on a walk in the country. Fido escapes and, in a parody of Lassie, is sent by Timmy to go home and find Helen. Helen comes and rescues Timmy from the bullies, who through their own misadventure and Fido's hunger for human flesh, are now zombies, and they try to forget about the whole thing. Several days later, the neighbor's body is "uncovered" and the murder is traced back to Fido, who is taken away to ZomCon, where the family is told he will be destroyed. Timmy learns through Cindy Bottoms, the daughter of Jonathan Bottoms, ZomCon's zealous security chief, that Fido has been put to work in a factory at ZomCon. Timmy sets out to rescue him with the help of Mr. Theopolis, a previous ZomCon employee, who was forced to leave when he was discovered to be suspected of fraternizing with his attractive female zombie.

Meanwhile, Timmy locates Fido, but is captured by Mr. Bottoms, who attempts to throw Timmy into the zombie-infested "wild zone" that exists outside of the fenced communities as punishment for his becoming attached to a zombie. Bill comes to the rescue and is killed in a struggle with Mr. Bottoms, who in turn is killed by Fido. Timmy is set free, and the news media states that the ZomCon security breach was the fault of rednecks who ventured out into the wild zone to hunt zombies for fun. Helen gives Bill the headless funeral he always wanted to prevent his zombification. The film ends with Fido as a surrogate father to Timmy, Helen, and Helen's newborn baby. They, along with a few neighbors, happily enjoy their new domestic lives together, including the zombified Jonathan Bottoms, who is now under the control of his daughter.

== Cast ==
- K'Sun Ray as Timmy Robinson
- Billy Connolly as Fido
- Carrie-Anne Moss as Helen Robinson
- Tim Blake Nelson as Mr. Theopolis
- Dylan Baker as Bill Robinson
- Henry Czerny as Jonathan Bottoms
- Sonja Bennett as Tammy
- Alexia Fast as Cindy Bottoms
- Terry M. Keyes as Herman, The Gravedigger
- Aaron Brown as Roy Fraser
- Brandon Olds as Stan Fraser
- Jennifer Clement as Dee Dee Bottoms
- Rob LaBelle as Frank Murphy
- Tiffany Lyndall-Knight as Miss Mills
- Mary Black as Mrs. Henderson
- Raymond E. Bailey as Floyd

== Production ==
Filming took place in Kelowna, British Columbia over 35 days. Director Andrew Currie wanted to make a cross-genre film, to avoid predictability. Currie was influenced by Lassie Come Home, The Night of the Hunter, Douglas Sirk films of the 1950s, Peyton Place, and George A. Romero's zombie films. The script was originally written in 1994, but creative differences kept it tied up. Eventually, Currie optioned it through his production company and completed the picture. The film was completely storyboarded prior to filming.

== Release ==
Fido premiered at the 2006 Toronto International Film Festival, where it was the Opening Canadian Gala film. It was also shown at the 2006 Vancouver International Film Festival, the 2007 Sundance Film Festival, the 2007 Kingston Canadian Film Festival, the 2007 Florida Film Festival, and the 2007 Gérardmer Fantasy Filmfest in France. It was theatrically released on March 9, 2007.

=== Home media ===
The DVD was released on October 23, 2007.

== Reception ==
=== Box office ===
The film grossed $304,533 in North America and a total of $426,224 worldwide. Domestic DVD sales were $2.95 million.

=== Critical response ===
Rotten Tomatoes, a review aggregator, reports that 71% of 76 surveyed critics gave the film a positive review, for an average rating was 6.5/10; the consensus is, "Making the most of its thin premise, Fido is an occasionally touching satire that provides big laughs and enough blood and guts to please gorehounds." Metacritic rated it 70/100 based on 12 reviews. Allan Walton of the Pittsburgh Post-Gazette gave it 5/5 stars, and called it "the best zombie spoof ever." Kirk Honeycutt of The Hollywood Reporter wrote, "For a one-joke movie, Fido does a fine job exploring every possible permutation of that joke." Dennis Harvey of Variety called it a "frisky yet strangely familiar" film that is amusing but does not fulfill all of its promise, and Manohla Dargis of The New York Times made it a NYT Critics' Pick, calling it a "ticklishly amusing satire" that sacrifices opportunities for satire for comedy.

Geoff Pevere of the Toronto Star described the film as a "smartly entertaining if slightly oversweet fusion of Douglas Sirkian melodrama (and especially All That Heaven Allows), all-American fifties science fiction, George Romero chompdown and Homeland Security satire," that is "strangely wholesome, gently splattery and adorably gory." Robert Abele of the Los Angeles Times called it a "crafty" and "deliciously funny" film that shows "there's still a lot of life left in the zombie flick." Scott Weinberg of Fearnet called it "pretty funny, surprisingly smart, pleasant to look at, and often quite sick," while Joshua Siebalt of Dread Central rated the film 4.5/5 stars and described it as "a damn smart film" that "works on almost every level." Another genre website reviewer, Brad Miska of Bloody Disgusting, wrote that the film may be a difficult sell to hardcore horror fans, but they will enjoy the comedy, gore, and originality.

Conversely, Joshua Rothkopf of Time Out New York rated the film 2/5 stars and called its satire tiresome and overdone. J. R. Jones of the Chicago Reader wrote that it is a "tired spoof" based on a throwaway gag from Shaun of the Dead, and Rob Nelson of The Village Voice called it an unfunny zombie parody that pales in comparison to 28 Weeks Later.

== See also ==
- Stubbs the Zombie
