= K'Sun Ray =

American actor

- Born: Kesun Mitchell Loder; May 22, 1993 (age 31); U.S.
- Occupation: Actor
- Years active: 2004–2014

Kesun Mitchell Loder (born 22 May 1993), better known by his stage name, K'Sun Ray, is an American actor. He is best known for starring as Timmy Robinson in the 2006 zombie film Fido, Jason Smith in the 2006 American drama television series Smith, and Young Tobias in the 2007 American police procedural crime drama television series Criminal Minds.

== Personal life ==
K'Sun was born in May 1993, as Kesun Loder in the United States. His career began in 2004, after he was cast in a starring role in the television movie Love's Enduring Promise.

He was arrested on October 16, 2011 in Wilmington, NC on attempted burglary charges.

== Film ==
Year	Title	Role	Notes
2004	Love's Enduring Promise	Aaron Davis	TV Movie
2005	Fielder's Choice	Zachary "Zach"	TV Movie
2006	Fido	Timothy "Timmy" Robinson	Movie
2009	Exit 19	Leo	TV Movie
2012	A Smile as Big as the Moon	Lewis Dayhuff	TV Movie

== Television ==
Year	Title	Role	Notes
2006	In Justice	Tyler "Ty" Buckner	Episode: "Cost of Freedom"
2006-2007	Smith	Jason Smith	5 episodes
2007	Criminal Minds	Young Tobias Henkel	2 episodes
2007	Heartland	Andrew "Andy" Wyles	Episode: "Picking Up Little Things"
2007	Monk	James "Jimmy" Krenshaw	Episode: "Mr. Monk and the Daredevil"
2007-2008	Life is Wild	Chase Clarke	11 episodes
2009	CSI: Crime Scene Investigation	Alexander "Alex" Palento	Episode: "The Grave Shift"
2009	ER	Felix Kirsch	Episode: "I Feel Good"
2009	Three Rivers	Roger Downing	Episode: "The Luckiest Man"

== Short ==
Year	Title	Role	Notes
2014	Lockdown	Trevor	Short film
