= Homecoming (TV series) =

American psychological thriller television series

- Title screen from the first episode
- Genre: Drama; Psychological thriller
- Created by: Eli Horowitz; Micah Bloomberg
- Based on: Homecoming by Gimlet Media
- Directed by: Sam Esmail (season 1); Kyle Patrick Alvarez (season 2)
- Starring: Julia Roberts; Bobby Cannavale; Stephan James; Shea Whigham; Alex Karpovsky; Sissy Spacek; Janelle Monáe; Hong Chau; Chris Cooper; Joan Cusack
- Country of origin: United States
- Original language: English
- No. of seasons: 2
- No. of episodes: 17

Production
- Executive producers: Micah Bloomberg; Eli Horowitz; Sam Esmail; Chad Hamilton; Julia Roberts; Alex Blumberg; Matt Lieber; Chris Giliberti; Kyle Patrick Alvarez
- Producers: John G. Lenic; Marc Bienstock
- Cinematography: Tod Campbell; Jas Shelton
- Editors: Rosanne Tan; Justin Krohn; Franklin Peterson
- Camera setup: Single-camera
- Running time: 24–37 minutes
- Production companies: Esmail Corp; Gimlet Pictures; Crocodile; We Here At; Red Om Films; Anonymous Content; Universal Content Productions; Amazon Studios

Original release
- Network: Amazon Prime Video
- Release: November 2, 2018 – May 22, 2020

Homecoming is an American psychological thriller television series based on the Gimlet Media podcast of the same name. The series premiered November 2, 2018, on Amazon Prime Video, and stars Julia Roberts, Bobby Cannavale, Stephan James, Shea Whigham, Alex Karpovsky, and Sissy Spacek. Created by Eli Horowitz and Micah Bloomberg, the pair also served as writers and executive producers alongside Sam Esmail, Chad Hamilton, Julia Roberts, Alex Blumberg, Matt Lieber, and Chris Giliberti. Esmail also directed every episode of the first season.

The series was given an initial series order for two seasons. The second season premiered on May 22, 2020, and deviates from the podcast, featuring a new story and characters. The second season was directed by Kyle Patrick Alvarez and stars Janelle Monáe, Chris Cooper and Joan Cusack, with Stephan James and Hong Chau returning from the first season.

== Premise ==
=== Season 1 ===
Heidi Bergman had been a social worker at the Homecoming Transitional Support Center, a live-in facility run by the Geist Group; the facility ostensibly helped soldiers transition to civilian life. Four years later, Bergman has started a new life working as a waitress and living with her mother, but has almost complete amnesia regarding her time at Homecoming. After a U.S. Department of Defense auditor inquires as to why she left Homecoming, Bergman starts to remember how she had been misled about the true purpose of the facility.

=== Season 2 ===
A woman wakes up on a rowboat with no memory of how she got there. She makes her way to shore in a catatonic state and is found by a park ranger, Donna. A VA card identifies her as Jackie, a veteran. The park ranger takes Jackie to a hospital. The doctor believes her to be a heroin user due to a bruise on her arm, but she leaves before they can confront her about it. A fellow patient whom Jackie met in the emergency room drives her to a bar and restaurant called Skins. Jackie had found a napkin in her coat from Skins. Hoping the visit there will help her understand her situation, Jackie is confronted by an employee who indicates she had indeed been there before.

== Cast and characters ==
=== Main ===
- Julia Roberts as Heidi Bergman (season 1), Walter's caseworker who is employed at a secret government facility, the Homecoming Transitional Support Center.
- Bobby Cannavale as Colin Belfast (season 1; guest season 2), Heidi's supervisor.
- Stephan James as Walter Cruz, a young military veteran and client of the Homecoming facility who is eager to rejoin civilian life.
- Shea Whigham as Thomas Carrasco (season 1), a bureaucrat from the Department of Defense investigating the Homecoming Transitional Support Center.
- Alex Karpovsky as Craig (season 1; recurring season 2), an employee at the Homecoming facility.
- Sissy Spacek as Ellen Bergman (season 1), Heidi's mother.
- Janelle Monáe as Jacqueline Calico / Alex Eastern (season 2), a woman who wakes up on a rowboat and goes on the search for her identity.
- Hong Chau as Audrey Temple (season 2; recurring season 1), an assistant at Geist Emergent Group, Homecoming's parent company.
- Chris Cooper as Leonard Geist (season 2), the owner of Geist Emergent Group.
- Joan Cusack as Francine Bunda (season 2), a representative from the Department of Defense who becomes a partner at Geist after the Homecoming incident.

=== Recurring ===
- Ayden Mayeri as Reina, the receptionist at the Homecoming Facility. (season 1)
- Bill Stevenson as Abe (season 1)
- Sam Marra as Javen (season 1)
- Marianne Jean-Baptiste as Gloria Morisseau, Walter's mother. (season 1)
- Jeremy Allen White as Shrier, a former soldier from the same unit as Walter and now a fellow client at the Homecoming facility. (season 1)
- Alden Ray as Maurice (season 1)
- Henri Esteve as Abel (season 1)
- Frankie Shaw as Dara (season 1)
- Gwen Van Dam as Mrs. Trotter (season 1)
- Brooke Bloom as Pam, Carrasco's boss at the Department of Defense.
- Sydney Poitier Heartsong as Lydia Belfast, Colin's wife. (season 1)
- Dermot Mulroney as Anthony, Heidi's boyfriend (season 1)
- Marcus Henderson as Engel (season 1)
- Jason Rogel as Cory (season 1)
- Rafi Gavron as Rainey (season 1)
- Jacob Pitts as AJ, who is exploring several new business ventures. (season 1)
- Lewie Bartone as New Guy (season 1)
- Kristof Konrad as Mr. Heidl (season 1)
- Fran Kranz as Ron, Colin's boss at Geist Emergent Group.
- Tyler Ritter as Lane (season 2)
- Mary Holland as Wendy (season 2)
- Jimmy Bellinger as Chad (season 2)
- Christopher Redman as Kyle (season 2)
- Johnny Sneed as Dr. Zamani (season 2)
- Audrey Wasilewski as Officer Donna (season 2)

=== Guests ===
- Caitlin Leahy as Kate ("Helping")
- Michael Hyatt as Evita ("Toys")
- Philip Anthony-Rodriguez as Ramon ("Protocol")
- John Billingsley as Buddy ("People")

== Episodes ==
Season	Episodes	Originally released
1	10	November 2, 2018
2	7	May 22, 2020

=== Season 1 (2018) ===
No. overall	No. in season	Title	Directed by	Teleplay by	Original release date
1	1	"Mandatory"	Sam Esmail	Eli Horowitz & Micah Bloomberg	November 2, 2018
In 2018, Walter Cruz leaves the military after three tours of duty and is placed at the Homecoming Transitional Support Center, a new facility designed to help ex-servicemen reintegrate into civilian life. He meets his counselor, Heidi Bergman, one of the administrators at Homecoming. Colin, Heidi's demanding boss, pushes her to collect "data" as soon as possible. In 2022, Heidi is living with her mother and working as a waitress, when she is approached by Thomas Carrasco, an investigator from the Department of Defense, who tells her he is following up on a complaint that Cruz was held at Homecoming against his will. Heidi says she has no recollection of him.
2	2	"Pineapple"	Sam Esmail	Eli Horowitz	November 2, 2018
Walter Cruz continues his sessions with Heidi Bergman at Homecoming and takes his daily medication as prescribed. His cynical roommate Shrier, with whom he served, doubts that they are there to receive help. Since they arrived at Homecoming via a military flight that landed at a base, Shrier believes they may not even be in Florida. He shares his suspicions with Walter and reveals that he hasn't been swallowing the daily pills. After an outburst during dinner, Shrier is moved to a different room. In 2022, Thomas tracks down Walter's mother, Gloria Morisseau, who is uncooperative but surprised to learn that Heidi Bergman does not remember Walter. Thomas reports his findings to his superior.
3	3	"Optics"	Sam Esmail	David Wiener	November 2, 2018
In 2018, Shrier convinces Walter to wander outside the facility and then steals a van, in which they drive around for hours before encountering anyone else. They stumble across a seemingly empty downtown, but they are convinced when they are told it is a retirement community. Shrier is expelled from Homecoming. Colin wants Walter gone as well, but Heidi is able to convince him that it will look even better for the program if he is successful after initially experiencing disciplinary issues. In 2022, Heidi meets with her ex-boyfriend, Anthony, who reminds her how her devotion to her career — and her boss, who called her constantly — ended their relationship. Anthony is stunned when Heidi does not remember Colin. Despite being pressured to close the case, Thomas follows his hunch and continues to look into Homecoming. When reviewing records, he notices that Walter and Heidi left Homecoming on the same date, May 15, 2018, when Walter was expelled for violence and Heidi was hospitalized.
4	4	"Redwood"	Sam Esmail	Micah Bloomberg	November 2, 2018
In 2018, Walter is upset that Shrier was expelled and his belongings thrown away, including the harmonica that belonged to Lesky, who was part of their unit. Heidi retrieves the harmonica for Walter, who tells her how Lesky was killed by an IED after Walter assigned him to another vehicle. Walter speaks to his mother, who is concerned about him and how vague he is acting. In 2022, Thomas goes to Geist Group, which ran Homecoming, and talks to Colin, who says he doesn't remember Homecoming or Heidi Bergman. Heidi is shocked to learn she was hospitalized and is having significant memory gaps. She finds her old phone and sees she called Colin constantly. She calls Colin, who hangs up on her.
5	5	"Helping"	Sam Esmail	Cami Delavigne	November 2, 2018
In 2018, Heidi bonds with Walter through a series of mutual pranks. One involves Heidi's pens, stapler, and other items she obsessively neatly aligns parallel to each other on her desk; Walter moves them to random angles and leaves them for her to find that way. Another involves bringing into Heidi's office the loud pelican they hear outside, whose cries punctuate their sessions. Colin hears that Heidi returned the harmonica to Walter and forces her to review the purpose of Homecoming, which is to eradicate PTSD via medication "to delete the harmful responses to the traumatic memories." Colin lectures her for returning an object that will remind him of the memories they are trying to erase. In 2022, Thomas tracks down Shrier, who is exhibiting signs of mental decline. Shrier says he warned Walter about Heidi and that she knew everything. Colin goes to Tampa to try to intimidate Heidi at the diner, but is shocked and then relieved when she does not recognize him. He is alarmed when he sees Thomas' business card left in a jar on the counter.
6	6	"Toys"	Sam Esmail	Shannon Houston	November 2, 2018
In 2018, after not hearing from Walter for two weeks, Gloria contacts the VA, who informs her Homecoming is run by a contractor, Geist Emergent Group. Gloria is sure that Geist, which manufactures household cleaners, has ulterior motives. She goes to Tampa and convinces him to leave. While packing, Walter confesses to Heidi he has feelings for her and decides to stay. As Gloria drives home, she calls the DOD hotline, pretending to be a Homecoming employee, and makes the anonymous complaint that Cruz is being held against his will. In 2022, Colin follows Heidi to the laundromat, where she still has no recollection of him, and flirts with her. He introduces himself as Hunter, a military contractor who just returned from Afghanistan and discovered his wife is leaving him. He takes her on a date and they sleep together. She confides that she thinks she did something wrong but doesn't know what it is.
7	7	"Test"	Sam Esmail	Eric Simonson	November 2, 2018
In 2018, in the fifth week of treatment, Heidi is shocked when Walter suddenly has no recollection of one of his funnier memories from service, a prank that he, Shrier and Lesky played on another serviceman. He also does not remember Lesky's death, which he detailed the previous week. Colin dismisses Heidi's alarm and lets it slip that the "success" of the medications means these soldiers will be able to be redeployed. In 2022, Thomas approaches Gloria, from whom he gets audio tapes of Walter's sessions with Heidi. Heidi is shocked to hear she sent the tapes to Gloria. She tells "Hunter" that she needs to go to Homecoming to find Colin, and he insists on accompanying her.
8	8	"Protocol"	Sam Esmail	Eli Horowitz	November 2, 2018
In 2022, Thomas' supervisor Pam chastises him for wasting time investigating Homecoming Protocol. Infuriated, he breaks into the Homecoming offices, which are closed for renovation. Meanwhile, Heidi and Colin explore an adjacent office building with the same layout, which she mistakes for her former place of business. Heidi realizes she has never been there before and feels even more lost. From the window of the other building, Thomas sees Heidi and Colin together. Just then, Heidi hears the loud cry of a pelican, bringing back her memory of Colin. She runs from him as Thomas chases them down. Colin insults and demeans Thomas, enraging Heidi, who pushes Colin into a fountain. Heidi leaves with Thomas.
9	9	"Work"	Sam Esmail	Micah Bloomberg	November 2, 2018
In 2022, Heidi tries to make sense of her role at Homecoming. Thomas escalates the complaint to the DOD Inspector General based upon what he has learned, but Pam calls Geist. In 2018, in week six, Heidi is upset when Walter talks excitedly about his redeployment and his hope that he will be reunited with Shrier (who was sent to a psychiatric facility), and Lesky, whose death has been erased from his memory. She takes him for another lunch at the cafeteria and joins him in eating, even though the food is loaded with the week-six high dosage of memory-erasing drugs.
10	10	"Stop"	Sam Esmail	Eli Horowitz & Micah Bloomberg	November 2, 2018
In 2018, Heidi takes her tapes of her sessions and leaves Homecoming after discharging Walter against Colin's wishes. Walter's extra dosage of Week 6 food leaves him incapacitated, and Heidi loses her memory. An employee at Homecoming falsifies records to claim that Walter was sent home for violent misconduct and that Heidi was hospitalized. In 2022, on being confronted about his altercation with Thomas at Homecoming and Thomas' escalation of the complaint, Colin panics, then suggests that Geist set Heidi up as a fall guy by claiming she was a rogue employee. His administrative assistant Audrey has now been appointed his new boss, and she informs Colin that he is the one who will be labeled the rogue employee. Heidi drives to Fish Camp, California, where Walter at age 17 had gone on a memorable road trip. In a diner, she sees Walter, and they speak for a few minutes. She sees he lives there happily and apparently doesn't remember her. However just after he leaves, Heidi looks down at her silverware and sees that Walter has moved her fork out of alignment with her knife and spoon, just as he used to in her office, and she looks out the window after him with a quizzical smile. A post-credits scene shows Colin signing papers to take the blame in any possible investigations. After Colin leaves the room, Audrey experiences anxiety and rubs the memory-deleting drug on her wrists.

=== Season 2 (2020) ===
No. overall	No. in season	Title	Directed by	Written by	Original release date
11	1	"People"	Kyle Patrick Alvarez	Micah Bloomberg & Eli Horowitz	May 22, 2020
A woman wakes up on a rowboat with no memory of how she got there. She sees a man onshore who leaves when she asks for help. She makes her way to shore in a catatonic state and is found by a park ranger, Donna. A VA card identifies her as Jackie, a veteran. The park ranger takes Jackie to a hospital. The doctor believes her to be a heroin user due to a bruise on her arm, but she leaves before they can confront her about it. A fellow patient whom Jackie met in the emergency room drives her to a bar and restaurant called Skins. Jackie had found a napkin in her coat from Skins. Hoping the visit there will help her understand her situation, Jackie is confronted by an employee who indicates she had indeed been at Skins. Uncovering a bit of her experience, she and her companion seek answers at an adjacent motel. In the vacant motel room, the pair find an empty medicine vial belonging to Geist as well as money, a credit card and a photo of Jackie in her military days. Jackie also discovers that her military tattoo can be washed off. She is knocked out by the stranger who has been helping her. On a farm, Leonard Geist cuts open a fruit, possibly the origin of the memory-erasing drug.
12	2	"Giant"	Kyle Patrick Alvarez	Zachary Wigon	May 22, 2020
At the motel, Jackie silences a car alarm using the car key fob which was in her jacket. This reveals that she had left her car there. Investigating the car, she finds the name of Alex Eastern, which was also on the credit card in the room. She visits Alex's home in Oakland and sneaks in to find Audrey Temple from Geist. From overhearing a phone conversation, she finds out that Audrey and Alex may work together. She follows Audrey's car to the Geist facility where the company is holding a brand relaunch party. Jackie is led into a testing room with other patients where she is invited to test new products. She suspects something sinister is going on, so she flees from the group and tasers the group's leader, Craig. She proceeds to snoop around the facility. Sneaking into Audrey's office, she finds vials of memory-erasing drugs and a photo of her. Audrey attempts to stop Leonard from speaking at the Geist relaunch, but he does so anyway and speaks out against the company. Jackie and Audrey meet, and Audrey calls her "Alex" before asking about Walter Cruz.
13	3	"Previously"	Kyle Patrick Alvarez	Sarah Carbiener & Erica Rosbe	May 22, 2020
Flashbacks reveal Alex/Jackie's role in persuading clients to drop complaints; in this case, persuading a woman to drop her sexual harassment complaint against her company. She is revealed to be in a relationship with Audrey who, under Colin's control, begins to feel not very valued in her work for Geist. She uses the memory-erasing drug to soothe her anxiety. Alex is revealed to have helped Audrey in coercing Colin to take the fall for the Homecoming program when the Department of Defense launched an investigation in the first season. Audrey heard of the investigation and, with Alex's help, managed to force him to take the blame. However, she tells Leonard Geist about Homecoming, which he had not heard of before. He fires Colin for having the veterans ingest the memory-erasing drugs. In Fish Camp, after leaving Heidi, Walter has painful flashbacks. He suspects that his memory actually may not have been altered through brain surgery.
14	4	"Soap"	Kyle Patrick Alvarez	Casallina Kisakye	May 22, 2020
Audrey attends the Department of Defense investigation meeting and confesses to having broke protocol. The meeting is witnessed by Francine Bunda, who later calls Audrey and asks if she and Leonard could give her a tour of the facility. Leonard stops using the memory-erasing drug roller while Walter soon discovers that he received treatment from Geist but no surgery. He becomes aggressive when he discovers that getting a response from Geist about his treatment will take 8–12 weeks. Leonard and Audrey both give Bunda a tour, but when he reveals he is going to stop using the berries, she becomes worried since she wanted to partner with Geist. She feels the program worked since no veteran came forward with issues and the only problem was with the protocols. She wants to revive the program. Leonard refuses but Bunda informs Audrey that the idea is moving forward regardless. Alex and Audrey celebrate, but the conversation moves to having children. Audrey receives Walter's information request, and Alex helps by pretending to be "Jackie" the veteran. She goes to bail Walter out of jail and persuade him to drop his concerns.
15	5	"Meters"	Kyle Patrick Alvarez	Evan Wright	May 22, 2020
Alex, now as "Jackie", bails Walter out of jail. As part of the bail relief, she supposedly needs to do an evaluation but manipulates him with her own war experiences. Audrey discovers Leonard has hired people to rip out the berries and gives him an injunction that cites the berries as crucial military technology and that they belong to the DoD. Leonard refuses to cooperate and begins digging on his own, even with the threat of arrest. Alex and Walter go to Skins for drinks where she opens up about her experience returning home from Syria. Soon the discussion turns to Homecoming. She suggests to him that he probably hit his head and never had surgery. She calls Audrey to tell her that Walter does not remember anything about the program. Audrey, with Bunda's help, soon takes control of Geist and orders her staff to throw a party. Alex and Walter get into an argument when she uses a story of her colleague who killed himself searching for answers. Walter storms off. Alex buys a syringe and a melon, setting her plan into place.
16	6	"Needle"	Kyle Patrick Alvarez	Patrick Macmanus	May 22, 2020
Alex, having purchased the syringe, fills it up with the drug from Audrey's roller and plans on wiping Walter's memory, practicing on the melon. After breaking inside Walter's house, she rings Geist and informs them that Walter is intending on visiting Geist to investigate, and wants Security put on alert for him as an intruder. However when she returns to her motel, she is surprised when finds him waiting outside her door. He apologises and takes her out fishing but the walk there soon leaves Walter questioning Alex's intentions especially when she slips up on her friend's shooting range, saying metres not yards. This leads to Walter confronting Alex, revealing that he followed her after their fight to the supermarket and the pharmacy where she got the syringes in her own car, having said she took the bus. Alex runs away, her cover blown and reveals that Geist is nervous about what he will do to the company. Alex tries stabbing Walter with the syringe but he turns it back on her and injects the drug into Alex who flees on the canoe.
17	7	"Again"	Kyle Patrick Alvarez	Micah Bloomberg & Eli Horowitz	May 22, 2020
Walter witnesses Alex out on the water, she loses her memory and he flees when she tries asking for help. Walter soon drives to Geist and meets Leonard and the two open up about Geist and how much Walter's life has been kept in the dark especially his arrival from the war and he persuades Leonard to finish off what he started. Picking up from the second episode, Audrey soon leads a confused and irritated Alex into a separate room where she informs her of everything that's happened; that she was going to persuade Walter to drop the case against Geist but that she was attacked by him. Leonard soon gives his fiery speech where he berates Bunda and the DOD. During the party, Bunda gives a speech and confirms her involvement in the project while celebrating Audrey who is there with Alex. However, Alex sees Walter as the server and soon everyone drinks a red liquid, revealed to be the memory erasing drug. Alex doesn't stop Audrey from drinking it, and a horrified Audrey looks up to Leonard saluting her, confirming his involvement in the process. Audrey soon collapses not long afterwards. Alex and Walter talk, he tells her to leave the party but she reveals that she is going to stay, because she knows what it feels like waking up alone. Walter drives off with a list of the other Homecoming patients.

== Production ==
=== Development ===
On December 16, 2016, it was announced that Universal Cable Productions had won the rights to Gimlet Media's podcast Homecoming for producer Sam Esmail to develop as a television series. The first season was executive produced by Esmail through his company Esmail Corp, along with podcast creators Eli Horowitz and Micah Bloomberg, podcast producer Alicia Van Couvering, Gimlet co-founders Alex Blumberg and Matt Lieber, and Gimlet Pictures founder Chris Giliberti, with production companies Esmail Corp, Anonymous Content, and Gimlet Media. Universal reportedly managed to outbid other interested parties including Sony Pictures Television for Michelle MacLaren, 20th Century Fox Television for Matt Reeves and Michael De Luca, and TriStar Pictures for George Clooney and his Smoke House Pictures banner as a feature film.

On July 19, 2017, it was announced that Amazon Video had given the production a two-season straight-to-series order. It was also reported that Horowitz and Bloomberg would write the series and that Esmail would direct it. On July 20, 2018, it was announced that the series would premiere on November 2, 2018. On April 8, 2020, it was announced that the second season would premiere on May 22, 2020. Esmail and Roberts returned as executive producers the second season, though Esmail did not direct any episodes and Roberts did not reprise her role.

=== Casting ===
On June 5, 2017, it was announced that Julia Roberts was in talks for the series' female lead. On November 8, 2017, it was announced that Stephan James was cast in the series' male lead. Later that month, Bobby Cannavale joined the cast. On January 17, 2018, it was reported that Shea Whigham had been cast as a series regular. In March 2018, it was announced that Alex Karpovsky had joined the main cast, that Dermot Mulroney, Hong Chau, Jeremy Allen White, Sydney Poitier, Marianne Jean-Baptiste, Brooke Bloom, Ayden Mayeri, Jacob Pitts, and Sissy Spacek had been cast in recurring roles, and that Fran Kranz would appear as a guest star. On January 16, 2019, it was reported that Roberts would not reprise her role of Heidi Bergman in the second season of the series but would continue to serve as an executive producer.

On July 23, 2019, it was announced that Janelle Monáe would star in the second season. In August 2019, it was confirmed that Stephan James and Hong Chau would return for the second season. Chris Cooper was cast the following month. In December 2019, it was announced Joan Cusack and Mary Holland had joined the cast of the series in recurring roles.

=== Filming ===
Filming was slated to begin in Los Angeles in April 2018. Principal photography actually began in February 2018 at the Universal Studios backlot in Los Angeles where the production became the first project to shoot in Universal's newly constructed production facilities. Exteriors of the Homecoming facility, as well as interiors of the facility lobby and Geist headquarters, were filmed at the former corporate headquarters of Toyota in Torrance, California.

== Release ==
Season 1 promotional poster featuring Julia Roberts as Heidi Bergman.

=== Marketing ===
On June 29, 2018, a series of "first look" images from the series were released. On July 20, 2018, the first teaser trailer for the series debuted at San Diego Comic-Con and was subsequently released online. A promotional poster for the series was also released. On September 8, 2018, the second teaser trailer was released. On September 13, 2018, the first official trailer for the series was released. On October 22, 2018, the second official trailer for the series was released.

=== Premiere ===
On September 7, 2018, the series held its world premiere during the 2018 Toronto International Film Festival at the Ryerson Theatre in Toronto, Ontario, Canada. The first four episodes of the series were screened as part of the festival's Primetime series of television screenings. On October 25, 2018, the series held its American premiere at the Regency Bruin Theatre in Westwood, Los Angeles, California. A screening of the first four episodes of the series took place during the event and those in attendance included Sam Esmail, Jennifer Salke, Julia Roberts, Stephan James, Dermot Mulroney, and Shea Whigham.

== Reception ==
Critical response of Homecoming
Season	Rotten Tomatoes	Metacritic
1	98% (99 reviews)	83 (35 reviews)
2	60% (48 reviews)	61 (21 reviews)

On Rotten Tomatoes it received an overall score of 79%, and an overall score of 75 on Metacritic.

=== Season 1 ===
The first season gained critical acclaim. On the review aggregation website Rotten Tomatoes, the first season holds a 98% approval rating with an average rating of 8.3 out of 10 based on 99 reviews. The website's critical consensus reads, "An impressive small-screen debut for Julia Roberts, Homecoming balances its haunting mystery with a frenetic sensibility that grips and doesn't let go." Metacritic, which uses a weighted average, assigned the first season a score of 83 out of 100 based on 35 critics, indicating "universal acclaim".

=== Season 2 ===
The second season received mixed to positive reviews from critics. On Rotten Tomatoes, the second season holds a 60% approval rating with an average rating of 6.7 out of 10 based on 48 reviews. The website's critical consensus reads, "As stylish, well-acted, and compelling as it can be, Homecoming's second season simply can't find its way out of the shadow of its first." Metacritic, which uses a weighted average, assigned the second season a score of 61 out of 100 based on 21 critics, indicating "generally favorable reviews".

=== Awards and nominations ===
Award	Year (Note: The listed year refers to the date of the ceremony, not necessarily the year in which the corresponding season or episode aired.)	Category	Nominee(s)	Result	Ref.
American Society of Cinematographers Awards	2021	Outstanding Achievement in Cinematography in an Episode of a Half-Hour Television Series	Jas Shelton (for "Giant")	Nominated	
Art Directors Guild Awards	2019	Excellence in Production Design for a Half Hour Single-Camera Series	Anastasia White (for "Mandatory")	Nominated	
Black Reel TV Awards	2020	Outstanding Actress, Drama Series	Janelle Monáe	Nominated	
Critics' Choice Television Awards	2019	Best Drama Series	Homecoming	Nominated	
Critics' Choice Television Awards	2019	Best Actress in a Drama Series	Julia Roberts	Nominated	
Critics' Choice Television Awards	2019	Best Supporting Actor in a Drama Series	Shea Whigham	Nominated	
Dorian Awards	2019	TV Drama of the Year	Homecoming	Nominated	
Dorian Awards	2019	TV Performance of the Year — Actress	Julia Roberts	Nominated	
Eddie Awards	2019	Best Edited Drama Series for Non-Commercial Television	Rosanne Tan (for "Redwood")	Nominated	
Golden Globe Awards	2019	Best Television Series – Drama	Homecoming	Nominated	
Golden Globe Awards	2019	Best Actor – Television Series Drama	Stephan James	Nominated	
Golden Globe Awards	2019	Best Actress – Television Series Drama	Julia Roberts	Nominated	
Golden Reel Awards	2019	Broadcast Media: Short Form Music / Musical	Ben Zales (for "Stop")	Nominated	
Golden Reel Awards	2019	Outstanding Achievement in Sound Editing – Live Action Under 35 Minutes	Tim Terusa & Kevin Meltcher (for "Protocol")	Nominated	
Golden Reel Awards	2021	Outstanding Achievement in Sound Editing – Live Action Under 35 Minutes	Kevin Buchholz, Brett Hinton, Ben Zales, Dan Kremer, Daniel Colman, Polly McKinnon, Helen Luttrell, Randy Guth, Dominique Decaudain, Pam Kahn, Nancy Parker and Mike Marino (for "Giant")	Nominated	
Golden Trailer Awards	2019	Best Horror/Thriller TV Spot/Trailer/Teaser for a Series	Homecoming "Forget", Amazon & Buddha Jones	Nominated	
Golden Trailer Awards	2019	Best Sound Editing in a TV Spot / Trailer / Teaser for a series	Homecoming "Forget", Amazon & Buddha Jones	Nominated	
Hollywood Professional Association Awards	2019	Outstanding Editing – Episodic or Non-theatrical Feature (30 Minutes and Under)	Rosanne Tan (for "Redwood")	Nominated	
Hollywood Professional Association Awards	2019	Outstanding Sound – Episodic or Non-theatrical Feature	John W. Cook II, Bill Freesh, Kevin Buchholz, Jeff A. Pitts, Ben Zales, Polly McKinnon & NBC Universal (for "Protocol")	Nominated	
International Film Festival of the Art of Cinematography Camerimage	2019	First Look - TV Pilots Competition	Tod Campbell	Nominated	
Peabody Awards	2019	Entertainment	Homecoming	Nominated	
Primetime Emmy Awards	2019	Outstanding Cinematography for a Single-Camera Series (Half-Hour)	Tod Campbell (for "Optics")	Nominated	
Primetime Emmy Awards	2020	Outstanding Cinematography for a Single-Camera Series (Half-Hour)	Jas Shelton (for "Giant")	Nominated	
Satellite Awards	2019	Best Television Series – Drama	Homecoming	Won	
Satellite Awards	2019	Best Actress – Television Series Drama	Julia Roberts	Won	
Satellite Awards	2019	Best Actress – Miniseries or Television Film	Julia Roberts	Nominated	
TCA Awards	2019	Outstanding Achievement in Drama	Homecoming	Nominated	
Writers Guild of America Awards	2019	Television: New Series	Micah Bloomberg, Cami Delavigne, Eli Horowitz, Shannon Houston, Eric Simonson & David Wiener	Nominated	

== See also ==
- List of podcast adaptations
