= Life Is Wild =

- Promotional poster
- Genre: Drama
- Based on: Wild at Heart by Ashley Pharoah
- Developed by: Michael Rauch
- Starring: D. W. Moffett; Leah Pipes; Stephanie Niznik; Andrew St. John; Calvin Goldspink; Atandwa Kani; David Butler; K'Sun Ray; Mary Mouser; Tiffany Mulheron
- Composers: Maurice White; Bob Christianson
- Country of origin: United States
- Original language: English
- No. of seasons: 1
- No. of episodes: 13

Production
- Executive producers: Michael Rauch; George Faber; Charlie Pattinson
- Running time: 60 minutes
- Production companies: 34 Films; Company Pictures; CBS Paramount Network Television

Original release
- Network: The CW
- Release: October 7, 2007 – February 3, 2008

Related
- Wild at Heart

Life Is Wild is an American drama television series adapted by Michael Rauch, George Faber and Charlie Pattinson from the British drama Wild at Heart. The show is about a New York veterinarian who moves his second wife and their two sets of children to a South African game reserve run by his former father-in-law.

Produced by CBS Paramount Network Television and Company Pictures, the series was officially greenlit by The CW and given a thirteen-episode order on May 15, 2007. The series premiered on October 7, 2007, and aired every Sunday night at 8:00PM Eastern/7:00PM Central, following a repeat of Aliens in America. It aired in Canada on the pay TV channel E! as a mid-season replacement, in Europe on pay TV, in the United Kingdom on the Hallmark Channel, in Greece on August 1, 2011 on Skai TV, in South America on the pay TV Warner Channel, and in New Zealand weekdays during the 2009 Christmas holiday period on TV3 in a daytime slot.

In February 2008, the show was canceled after one season due to low ratings.

== Cast ==
=== Main ===
- D. W. Moffett as Danny Clarke
- Leah Pipes as Katie Clarke
- Stephanie Niznik as Jo Weller-Clarke
- Andrew St. John as Jesse Weller
- Calvin Goldspink as Oliver Banks
- Atandwa Kani as Tumelo
- David Butler as Art
- K'Sun Ray as Chase Clarke
- Mary Mouser as Mia Weller
- Tiffany Mulheron as Emily Banks

=== Recurring ===
- George Jackos as Colin Banks
- Shannon Esra as Lauren
- Precious Kofi as Mbali

Brett Cullen and Judith Hoag were originally cast as Danny Clarke and Jo Clarke respectively but the roles were recast in June and July 2007. Jeremy Sheffield was also originally cast in the recurring role of Colin Banks but was replaced by George Jackos when the show received a series order.

== Episodes ==
No.	Title	Directed by	Written by	Original release date	Prod. code
1	"Pilot"	Bryan Gordon	Michael Rauch	October 7, 2007	100
A New York veterinarian moves his second wife and their two sets of children to a South African game reserve run by his former father-in-law.
2	"Ubuntu"	James Steven Sadwith	Michael Rauch	October 14, 2007	101
School begins and Emily and another popular girl, Lauren (Shannon Esra), offer Katie help with an assignment, but Lauren grows jealous of Katie's relationship with Oliver and plays a trick on her. Later, Tumelo shows her true friendship and helps her complete her work. Meanwhile, rebellious Jesse tests the school's rules and falls for a local bartender (Precious Kofi); and Danny battles a mysterious illness among the local wildlife.
3	"Open for Business"	Brian Grant	Sue Tenney	October 21, 2007	102
Jo and Art finally open the Blue Antelope and welcome their first guests, but they realize that running an eco-friendly lodge requires more work than they anticipated; and Katie auditions for the Spring Sing Fling and shocks her friends with her beautiful voice. Meanwhile, Jesse gets a job at the Ant's Hill, but Mbali questions him about his age; and Danny investigates a mysterious illness among the zebras and wildebeests.
4	"Heritage Day"	Ed Fraiman	Dana Baratta	October 28, 2007	103
Katie accepts Tumelo's invitation to join him in the township's traditional celebration of Heritage day, a national holiday, although she'd rather attend a party at the Mara Lodge with Oliver and Emily. Elsewhere, a vervet monkey steals Jesse's shaving kit and is on the loose; and Danny and Jo go to the township's party with Chase and Mia.
5	"Bad to the Bone"	Brain Grant	Raven Metzner & Stu Zicherman	November 4, 2007	104
Katie and Jesse grumble about having to do chores around the lodge for the weekend rather than hanging out with friends, and they separately make bad decisions in a rebellious moment. Jesse takes off with Oliver, and the pair has an encounter with a cheetah that prompts Jesse to call on Danny for help; later, Katie thinks Oliver likes bad girls, so she meets him at a bar and both of them end up being put in jail.
6	"Games People Play"	James Steven Sadwith	Elizabeth Hunter	November 11, 2007	105
Katie gets to put her soccer skills to good use when she learns that the boys will compete against the girls in a charity match for underprivileged children. But her talents cause tension between her and Oliver, so she decides to hold back a little. Meanwhile, Jesse befriends a guest (Karl Thaning) at the Blue Antelope, a carefree adventurer whose actions get Jesse hurt.
7	"The Heart Wants What It Wants"	Ed Fraiman	Maggie Bandur	November 18, 2007	106
A wedding is held at the Blue Antelope and Katie helps Jo with the preparations, and she also learns a secret about Oliver's father that pushes her and Oliver apart. Elsewhere, Danny asks Tumelo to help him take care of an ill elephant that also seems to have an unnatural attraction to a giraffe; and Jesse and Mbali share a scary experience at work.
8	"Animal House"	Brain Grant	Michael Rauch	December 2, 2007	107
Jo and Danny are on their way to a conference for lodge operators and reluctantly leave Jesse and Katie in charge for the weekend. Jesses invites Emily and some of her friends to hang out, which quickly turns into a full blown, out-of-control party. Oliver and Katie are interrupted during a serious conversation when Stella, a lioness, decides to crash the party.
9	"The Code"	Ed Fraiman	Sue Tenney	December 9, 2007	108
Katie, Oliver, Emily and Tumelo form their own study group to prepare for their midterms; and Jesse comes to Katie for help in a class that he's failing. Meanwhile, guests at the Blue Antelope are disappointed to learn there's no guided wildlife hunt, so they decide to go the Mara Lodge instead; and Danny and Art take steps to protect white lions from hunters.
10	"Rescue Me"	Brain Grant	Dana Baratta	January 6, 2008	109
Katie, Jesse, Oliver, Emily and Tumelo join their classmates on an adventure in the bush. Jesse rebels against the counselor and refuses to participate in any activity, but the others set off to hike the trail. A lost map, a wet radio and a close encounter with a crocodile causes tension between the group and Tumelo and Katie end up lost in a cave. Meanwhile, Jo's best friend from New York is in town and is very honest about her opinion of the new life Jo leads in Africa. After Katie is rescued, at home again, she breaks up with .
11	"Love Life"	Ed Fraiman	Jennifer Levin	January 20, 2008	110
Katie befriends the counselor (Tema Sebopedi) of an HIV-positive support group, and she has doubts about her split from Oliver. Meanwhile, Emily confronts Jesse when he spends a lot of time with Mbali; and an inspector visits the Blue Antelope and reveals that it's not up to eco-friendly standards.
12	"P.O.C."	James Steven Sadwith	Michael Rauch	January 27, 2008	111
Katie and Tumelo each go through a breakup and discover that their relationship is very special; and Jesse helps Mbali find the strength to call off her engagement. Meanwhile, Jo and Art trade chores to learn whose duties are more difficult.
13	"Home"	Brian Grant	D.E. Klerk	February 3, 2008	112
At Art's insistence, Danny tries to introduce a male lion into the Blue Antelope's pride, but the plan goes awry and both men are seriously injured. Meanwhile, Jesse decides that he wants to go back to New York, but Katie tries to persuade him to stay.

== Reception ==
=== U.S. Nielsen ratings ===
#	Episode	Airdate	Rating	Share	18–49 (Rating/Share)	Viewers (m)	Rank (#)
1	"Pilot"	October 7, 2007	1.2	2	0.4/1	1.65	99/110
2	"Ubuntu"	October 14, 2007	0.7	1	0.3/1	1.06	100/110
3	"Open for Business"	October 21, 2007	1.1	2	0.5/1	1.61	96/107
4	"Heritage Day"	October 28, 2007	0.8	1	0.4/1	1.10	95/97
5	"Bad to the Bone"	November 4, 2007	0.8	1	0.4/1	1.07	98/100
6	"Games People Play"	November 11, 2007	1.0	2	0.4/1	1.35	99/101
7	"The Heart Wants What It Wants"	November 18, 2007	1.0	2	0.4/1	1.39	99/101
8	"Animal House"	December 2, 2007	0.9	1	0.4/1	1.25	96/98
9	"The Code"	December 9, 2007	0.8	1	0.4/1	1.11	100/102
10	"Rescue Me"	January 6, 2008	0.6	1	0.3/1	0.85	92/94
11	"Love Life"	January 20, 2008	0.6	1	0.2/.5	0.80	TBA
12	"P.O.C."	January 27, 2008	0.8	1	0.4/1	1.11	TBA
13	"Home"	February 3, 2008	0.6	1	0.2/0	0.75	TBA

- Episode 13 aired against Super Bowl XLII.

Life Is Wild averaged 1.16 million viewers for its sole season.
